= 2013–14 Zamalek SC season =

Zamalek
2013–14 season
- Chairman: Mamdouh Abbas (until 21 October 2013); Kamal Darwish (Interim) (until 28 March 2014); Mortada Mansour
- Manager: (Egypt) Helmy Toulan (until 21 January 2014) (Egypt) Ahmed Hossam
- Egyptian Premier League: 1st (Group 2); 3rd (Championship Playoff)
- Egypt Cup: Winner
- 2014 CAF Champions League: Eliminated (Round 8)
Home colours	Away colours

The 2013–14 season is Zamalek Sporting Club's 103rd season of football, 58th consecutive season in the Egyptian Premier League. The club also plays in the CAF Champions League.

== Team kit ==
The team kits for this season are manufactured by Adidas.

Home	Away	Goalkeeper 1	Goalkeeper 2	Goalkeeper 3

== Squad ==
As of 14 May 2015.

Egyptian Football Association (EFA) rules are that a team may only have 3 foreign born players in the squad.
The Squad Has 25 Players Registered as Professionals and 5 Players Registered (-U23) and 2 Players of the Youth academy

No.	Nationality	Name	Age
Goalkeepers
16	(Egypt)	Abdelwahed El-Sayed (captain)	37
1	(Egypt)	Mohamed Abou Gabal	24
21	(Egypt)	Gennesh	26
Defenders
2	(Egypt)	Salah Soliman	23
4	(Egypt)	Ahmed Samir	32
6	(Egypt)	Omar Gaber	21
7	(Egypt)	Hazem Emam	26
8	(Egypt)	Hani Saied	30
13	(Egypt)	Mohamed Abdel-Shafy	28
22	(Egypt)	Hamada Tolba	32
19	(Egypt)	Ahmed Samir Farag	27
20	(Egypt)	Mahmoud Fathallah	31
29	(Egypt)	Yasser Ibrahim	24
30	(Egypt)	Abd El-Rahman Salah	19
Midfielders
5	(Egypt)	Ibrahim Salah	26
11	(Egypt)	Moamen Zakaria	25
12	(Egypt)	Ahmed Tawfik	22
14	(Egypt)	Mohamed Ibrahim	21
15	(Egypt)	Nour El Sayed	29
17	(Egypt)	Omar Gamal	31
18	(Egypt)	Islam Awad	26
24	(Egypt)	Said Mohamed Otta	21
28	(Egypt)	Omar Youssef	18–19
34	(Egypt)	Mostafa Fathi	19
Forwards
3	(Mauritania)	Dominique Da Silva	24
9	(Egypt)	Ahmed Gaafar	27
25	(Egypt)	Arafa El-Sayed	24
23	(Egypt)	Ahmed Ali Kamel	27
33	(Egypt)	Youssef Obama	18

=== Out on loan ===
Note: Flags indicate national team as defined under FIFA eligibility rules; some limited exceptions apply. Players may hold more than one non-FIFA nationality.

No.	Pos.	Nation	Player
14	FW	EGY	Ahmed Eid Abdel Malek (at Al-Ahly Benghazi until June 2014)

== Transfers ==
=== In ===
Date	Position	Name	From	Fee
14 July 2013	FW	(Egypt) Ali Fareed	(Egypt) Itesalat	Free
16 July 2013	GK	(Egypt) Mohamed El-Aqabawy	(Egypt) Al-Mokawloon	Free
July 2013	DF	(Egypt) Ahmed Fawzi	(Egypt) Wadi Degla	Free
August 2013	GK	(Egypt) Mohamed Abou Gabal	(Egypt) ENPPI	Free
20 September 2013	GK	(Egypt) Moamen Zakaria	(Egypt) ENPPI	Loan
October 2013	DF	(Egypt) Yasser Ibrahim	(Egypt) Mansoura	N/A
8 October 2013	FW	(Egypt) Arafa El-Sayed	(Egypt) El Gouna	$100,000
8 October 2013	FW	(Egypt) Ahmed Ali Kamel	(Egypt) Ismaily	$100,000
8 October 2013	MF	(Egypt) Mostafa Fathi	(Egypt) Belkas	N/A
12 January 2014	AM	(Egypt) Omar Gamal	(Libya) Al-Ahly (Tripoli)	N/A
27 January 2014	FW	(Mauritania) Dominique Da Silva	(Egypt) Al Ahly SC	Free
27 February 2014	AM	(Egypt) Ahmed Samir Farag	(Belgium) Lierse S.K.	N/A

== Friendlies ==
=== Pre-season friendlies ===
7 July 2013	Zamalek (Egypt)	4–0	(Sudan) Al Khartoum	Al-Haddaf Stadium, 6 October, Giza, Egypt

15 July 2013	Zamalek (Egypt)	1–0	(Egypt) El-Entag El-Harby	Al-Haddaf Stadium, 6 October, Giza, Egypt
	Gaber (?)

=== Mid-season friendlies ===
12 August 2013	Zamalek (Egypt)	4–0	(Egypt) Al-Taiebeen	Al-Haddaf Stadium, 6 October, Giza, Egypt

8 September 2013	Zamalek (Egypt)	3–0	(Egypt) Misr Lil-Ta'meen	Al-Haddaf Stadium, 6 October, Giza, Egypt
	Hassan (?); Awad (?)

12 October 2013	Al-Zawra'a (Iraq)	2–2	(Egypt) Zamalek	Basra International Stadium, Basra, Iraq
	Salim 11'; Hussein 53'		Gaafar 70'; Zakaria 85'

18 October 2013	Zamalek (Egypt)	4–1	(Egypt) Toukh	Helmi Zamora Stadium, Giza, Egypt

30 October 2013	Zamalek (Egypt)	1–1	(Egypt) Bahteem	Helmi Zamora Stadium, Giza, Egypt
14:30 UTC+2	Fathalla 34'		Ali 57'

21 November 2013	Zamalek (Egypt)	3–0	(Egypt) Belkas	Helmi Zamora Stadium, Giza, Egypt
13:00	Ibrahim 23'; Samir 73'; Gaffar 90'

23 November 2013	Zamalek (Egypt)	5–0	(Egypt) Misr El-Makasa	Helmi Zamora Stadium, Giza, Egypt

28 November 2013	Zamalek (Egypt)	3–0	(Egypt) Sokar Al-Hawamdia	Helmi Zamora Stadium, Giza, Egypt
				Referee: Said Lotfy

30 November 2013	Zamalek (Egypt)	1–0	(Egypt) El-Entag El-Harby	Helmi Zamora Stadium, Giza, Egypt
	Abdel Malek (?)

4 December 2013	Zamalek (Egypt)	3–1	(Egypt) Helwan	Helmi Zamora Stadium, Giza, Egypt
	Fathalla 2'

12 December 2013	Zamalek (Egypt)	2–0	(Egypt) Bassion	Helmi Zamora Stadium, Giza, Egypt
	Awad 43'; Ali 90'

14 December 2013	Zamalek (Egypt)	5–1	(Egypt) Al-Hadeed Wa Al-Solb	Helmi Zamora Stadium, Giza, Egypt
	Abdel Malek 3', 39'; Gaffar 31'; Samir 45'; El-Sayed 50'		? 64'

18 December 2013	Zamalek (Egypt)	3–1	(Egypt) Suez Montakhab	Al-Haddaf Stadium, 6 October, Giza, Egypt
	Soliman (?); Awad 58'; Ibrahim 90' (pen.)		? (?)

28 December 2013	Zamalek (Egypt)	4–0	(Egypt) Othmathon	Al-Haddaf Stadium, 6 October, Giza, Egypt
	Ibrahim 12', 21', 88'; Ali 59'

30 January 2014	Zamalek (Egypt)	5–1	(Egypt) Heliopolis FC	Heliopolis Stadium, Cairo, Egypt
	Ibrahim (?); Tolba (?); Awad (?); Dominique (?); Mohie (?)		(?)

27 March 2014	Zamalek (Egypt)	3–2	(Egypt) Fakous FC	30 June Stadium (Sub field), Cairo
	Abd El-Mejeed 6'; Dominique 49' (.pen); Samir 75'		Shabrawy 44'; Gad 62'

6 April 2014	Zamalek (Egypt)	3–2	(Egypt) Meiah Al-Beheira
	Fathi 20'; Obama 56', 65'		(?) (?)

2 June 2014	Zamalek (Egypt)	0–0	(Egypt) El-Entag El-Harby	Al-Salam Stadium, Cairo

== 2013 CAF Champions League ==
=== Group stage ===
Pos	Team	Pld	W	D	L	GF	GA	GD	Pts	Qualification
1	(Egypt) Al-Ahly	6	3	2	1	8	7	+1	11	Advance to knockout stage
2	(South Africa) Orlando Pirates	6	2	2	2	8	4	+4	8	Advance to knockout stage
3	(Egypt) Zamalek	6	2	1	3	10	12	−2	7 (Note: Zamalek are ranked ahead of AC Léopards on head-to-head record).)	
4	(Republic of the Congo) AC Léopards	6	2	1	3	4	7	−3	7	

Source: CAF

=== Matches ===
24 July 2013 1	Zamalek (Egypt)	1–1	(Egypt) Al-Ahly	El Gouna Stadium, El Gouna
16:30 UTC+2	Gaafar 8'	Report	Aboutrika 54' (pen.)	Attendance: 0 Referee: Djamel Haimoudi (Algeria)

4 August 2013 2	AC Léopards (Republic of the Congo)	1–0	(Egypt) Zamalek	Stade Denis Sassou Nguesso, Dolisie
15:30 UTC+1	Ntela 37' (pen.)	Report		Referee: Hamada Nampiandraza (Madagascar)

17 August 2013 3	Orlando Pirates (South Africa)	4–1	(Egypt) Zamalek	Orlando Stadium, Johannesburg
20:00 UTC+2	Bacela 27'; Segolela 52'; Myeni 74'; Klate 82'	Report	Shikabala 29'	Referee: Slim Jedidi (Tunisia)

1 September 2013 4	Zamalek (Egypt)	2–1	(South Africa) Orlando Pirates	El Gouna Stadium, El Gouna
16:00 UTC+2	Abdel Malek 6' (pen.); Soliman 51'	Report	Bacela 33'	Referee: Noumandiez Doué (Ivory Coast)

15 September 2013 5	Al-Ahly (Egypt)	4–2	(Egypt) Zamalek	El Gouna Stadium, El Gouna
15:00 UTC+2	Soliman 9'; Abd El-Zaher 15'; Aboutrika 52'; Ahmed Fathy 71'	Report	Gaber 4'; Hassan 82'	Referee: Néant Alioum (Cameroon)

22 September 2013 6	Zamalek (Egypt)	4–1	(Republic of the Congo) AC Léopards	El Gouna Stadium, El Gouna
15:00 UTC+2	Ibrahim 33'; Shikabala 45+1'; Gaafar 57', 65'	Report	Bhebey Ndey 26'	Referee: Ousmane Fall (Senegal)

== 2013 Egypt Cup ==
22 October 2013 Round of 16	Zamalek	4–0	Tanta	El Gouna
14:30 UTC+2	Abdel Malek 20'; Emam 29'; Gaafar 60'; Ali 71' (pen.)			Stadium: El Gouna Stadium; Attendance: 0 Referee: Mohamed Farouk

27 October 2013 Quarter-finals	Zamalek	3–0	El-Entag El-Harby	El Gouna
14:30 UTC+2	Gaafar 75'; Ali 82', 85'			Stadium: El Gouna Stadium; Attendance: 0

3 November 2013 Semi-finals	Zamalek	2–1	Tala'ea El-Gaish	El Gouna
14:30 UTC+2	Gaafar 2'; Emam 45+2'		Hefny 48'	Stadium: El Gouna Stadium; Attendance: 0 Referee: Mahmoud Al-Banna

9 November 2013 Final	Zamalek	3–0	Wadi Degla	El Gouna
14:30 UTC+2	Gaafar 13', 57'; Shikabala 65'	Report		Stadium: El Gouna Stadium; Attendance: 4,000; Referee: Mohamed Farouk (Egypt)

== Egyptian Premier League ==
=== Group 2 ===
Pos	Team	Pld	W	D	L	GF	GA	GD	Pts	Qualification or relegation
1	Zamalek (Q)	20	10	5	5	35	21	+14	35	Qualification to Championship play-off
2	Petrojet (Q)	20	9	8	3	28	17	+11	35	Qualification to Championship play-off
3	Ittihad El Shorta	20	9	8	3	25	16	+9	35	
4	Ismaily	20	8	8	4	24	16	+8	32	
5	Tala'ea El Gaish	20	5	10	5	19	17	+2	25	

Source: Soccerway
Rules for classification: 1) Points; 2) Goal difference; 3) Goals scored.
(Q) Qualified to the phase indicated

==== Results by matchday ====
Round	1	2	3	4	5	6	7	8	9	10	11	12	13	14	15	16	17	18	19	20	21	22
Ground	H	–	H	A	H	A	H	A	A	H	A	H	-	A	A	H	H	A	H	A	H	H
Result	W	Bye	L	W	L	W	D	W	D	D	L	D	Bye	W	W	W	L	W	L	W	D	W
Position	1	5	5	3	5	4	3	3	5	4	6	6	6	4	3	2	4	3	4	3	3	1

Updated to match(es) played on 17 March 2014. Source: fifa.com
A = Away; H = Home; W = Win; D = Draw; L = Loss

==== Results summary ====
Overall								Home						Away					
Pld	W	D	L	GF	GA	GD	Pts	W	D	L	GF	GA	GD	W	D	L	GF	GA	GD
20	10	5	5	35	21	+14	35	4	4	2	19	11	+8	6	1	3	16	10	+6

Last updated: 14 June 2014.
Source: 2013–14 Egyptian Premier League

==== Matches ====
25 December 2013 1	Zamalek	2–0	Al-Masry	Agroud Stadium, Suez
14:00 UTC+2	Abdel Malek 70' (pen.); Ali 83'			Attendance: 0 Referee: Gehad Grisha

2 January 2014 3	Zamalek	0–1	Ismaily	Cairo Stadium, Cairo
17:00 UTC+2			Hassan 30'	Attendance: 0 Referee: Ibrahim Noor Al-Deen

7 January 2014 4	Tala'ea El Gaish	0–1	Zamalek	30 June Stadium, Cairo
17:00 UTC+2			Abdel-Shafy 51'	Attendance: 0 Referee: Mohamed Sabahi

19 January 2014 5	Zamalek	0–2	Haras El Hodood	Cairo Stadium, Cairo
17:00 UTC+2	Mohamed Ibrahim 8' (pen.)		Ahmed Safi 75'	Attendance: 0 Referee: Mohamed El-Hanafy
Note: Match ended 1–1, but the result was confirmed as 2–0 in favor of Haras El Hodood as a result of the crowds entering the stadium despite Federation decision of playing all league matches with no crowds.

29 January 2014 6	El-Minya	0–1	Zamalek	Al-Salam Stadium, Cairo
14:30 UTC+2			Ali 59'	Attendance: 0 Referee: Amr Aied

2 February 2014 7	Zamalek	2–2	Petrojet	Cairo Stadium, Cairo
17:00 UTC+2	Odo 1' (o.g.); Mohamed Ibrahim 76' (pen.)		Ragab 9', 54'	Attendance: 0 Referee: Mohamed Farouk

5 February 2014 8	Al-Qanah	0–4	Zamalek	Ismailia Stadium, Ismaïlia
17:00 UTC+2			Ali 28', 56'; Dominique 66'; Gaber 87'	Attendance: 0 Referee: Sherief Rashwan

24 February 2014 11	Ittihad El-Shorta	1–1	Zamalek	Arab Contractors Stadium, Cairo
17:00 UTC+2	Maged 75'		Emam 57'	Attendance: 0 Referee: Mahmoud El-Banna

12 March 2014 9	Zamalek	0–0	Telephonat Beni Sweif	Cairo Stadium, Cairo
17:30 UTC+2				Attendance: 0 Referee: Mohamed Marouf

17 March 2014 12	Al-Masry	1–0	Zamalek	Agroud Stadium, Suez
15:00 UTC+2	El-Sharawy 20'			Attendance: 0 Referee: Gehad Grisha

3 April 2014 15	Zamalek	1–1	Tala'ea El Gaish	30 June Stadium, Cairo
18:00 UTC+2	Dominique 19'		Yossef 12'	Attendance: 0 Referee: Mohamed Farouk

9 April 2014 10	Wadi Degla	2–3	Zamalek	30 June Stadium, Cairo
18:00 UTC+2	Abd El-Wahed 41' (pen.); Al-Agha 65'		Fathallah 27' (pen.); Obama 79'; Fathi 83'	Attendance: 0 Referee: Ibrahim Noor Al-Deen

13 April 2014 16	Haras El Hodood	0 – 2	Zamalek	El-Max Stadium, Alexandria
18:00 UTC+2			Y. Ibrahim 75'; Ali 79'	Attendance: 0 Referee: Sherief Rashwan

17 April 2014 17	Zamalek	4–0	El-Minya	30 June Stadium, Cairo
18:00 UTC+2	Ali 41', 61'; Zakaria 88'; Abdel-Shafy 90+2'			Attendance: 0 Referee: Samir Othman

22 April 2014 18	Petrojet	4–2	Zamalek	Agroud Stadium, Suez
15:30 UTC+2	Shebeita 36'; Magdy 71' (pen.); Mohsen 77' (pen.); Tibi 90+1'		Dominique 25'; M. Ibrahim 84' (pen.)	Referee: Mahmoud El-Banna

27 April 2014 19	Zamalek	4–0	Al-Qanah	30 June Stadium, Cairo
18:00 UTC+2	M. Ibrahim 20' (pen.); Fathalla 30'; Fathi 47'; Gaber 84'			Attendance: 0 Referee: Mohamed Sabahi

1 May 2014 14	Ismaily	1–0	Zamalek	Ismailia Stadium, Ismaïlia
19:00 UTC+2	Antwi 62'			Attendance: +1000; Referee: Gehad Grisha

5 May 2014 20	Telephonat Beni Sweif	1–2	Zamalek	30 June Stadium, Cairo
20:00 UTC+2	Frrag 6'		Farag 14'; Obama 90+6'	Attendance: 0 Referee: Mahmoud Ashour

13 May 2014 21	Zamalek	2–2	Wadi Degla	30 June Stadium, Cairo
16:00 UTC+2	Gaber 64'; Gaafar 90+3'		Talaat 28'; Al-Agha 42'	Attendance: 0 Referee: Samir Othman

14 June 2014 22	Zamalek	4–3	Ittihad El-Shorta	30 June Stadium, Cairo
17:30 UTC+3	Zakaria 21'; Fathallah 40' (pen.) 85'; Fathi 87'		Duiedar 14' (pen.); Kamar 50'; Maged 90+5'	Attendance: 0 Referee: Ibrahim Noor Al-Deen

=== Championship play-off ===
Pos	Team	Pld	W	D	L	GF	GA	GD	Pts	Qualification or relegation
1	Al Ahly (C)	3	2	1	0	5	0	+5	7	Qualification to Champions League
2	Smouha	3	2	1	0	6	2	+4	7	Qualification to Champions League
3	Zamalek	3	1	0	2	3	3	0	3	Qualification to Confederation Cup (Note: Since the winners of the 2014 Egypt Cup, Zamalek, qualified for African competition based on league position, the spot awarded to the Cup winner (Confederation Cup) was passed to the fourth-placed team which were the next best teams in the table not already qualified for any African competition.)
4	Petrojet	3	0	0	3	1	10	−9	0	Qualification to Confederation Cup

Source: Soccerway
Rules for classification: 1) Points; 2) Goal difference; 3) Goals scored.
(C) Champion

==== Matches ====
28 June 2014 1	Zamalek	0–1	Al Ahly
20:30 UTC+2			Tawfik 21' (o.g.)	Attendance: 0 Referee: Ibrahim Noor Al-Deen

2 July 2014 2	Zamalek	1–2	Smouha
21:30 UTC+2	Ali 64'		Ali 29'; Ashraf 41'	Attendance: 0 Referee: Gehad Grisha

7 July 2014 3	Zamalek	2–0	Petrojet
21:30 UTC+2	Ali 33'; Emam 83'			Attendance: 0 Referee: Mohamed Marouf

== 2014 CAF Champions League ==
=== Preliminary round ===
9 February 2014 First leg	Zamalek (Egypt)	2–0	(Niger) AS Douanes	Cairo Stadium, Cairo
18:30 UTC+2	Ibrahim 34' (pen.); Zakaria 84'			Attendance: 10,000; Referee: Nour El-Deen El-Jaafari (Morocco)

16 February 2014 Second leg	AS Douanes (Niger)	0–1 (0–3 agg.)	(Egypt) Zamalek	Stade Général Seyni Kountché, Niamey, Niger
16:00 UTC+1			Emam 66'	Referee: Juenkou Wandji (Cameroon)

=== First round ===
1 March 2014 First leg	Zamalek (Egypt)	1–0	(Angola) Kabuscorp	Cairo Stadium, Cairo
18:45 UTC+2	Fathalla 56'			Attendance: 0 Referee: Mutaz Khairalla (Sudan)

7 March 2014 Second leg	Kabuscorp (Angola)	0–0 (0–1 agg.)	(Egypt) Zamalek	Estádio dos Coqueiros, Luanda, Angola
15:30 UTC+1				Attendance: 30,000; Referee: Noumandiez Doué (Ivory Coast)

=== Second round ===
22 March 2014 First leg	Nkana (Zambia)	0–0	(Egypt) Zamalek	Nkana Stadium, Kitwe, Zambia
15:00 UTC+2				Referee: Davies Omweno (Kenya)

30 March 2014 Second leg	Zamalek (Egypt)	5–0 (5–0 agg.)	(Zambia) Nkana	30 June Stadium, Cairo
18:45 UTC+2	Tawfik 21'; Zakaria 35'; Gaber 48'; Gaafar 59'; Emam 70'			Attendance: 0 Referee: Néant Alioum (Cameroon)

=== Group stage ===
Pos	Team	Pld	W	D	L	GF	GA	GD	Pts	Qualification
1	(Democratic Republic of the Congo) TP Mazembe	6	3	2	1	5	2	+3	11 (Note: Tiebreakers: TP Mazembe and AS Vita Club are ranked on head-to-head record.)	Advance to knockout stage
2	(Democratic Republic of the Congo) AS Vita Club	6	3	2	1	6	4	+2	11	Advance to knockout stage
3	(Sudan) Al-Hilal	6	2	1	3	7	9	−2	7	
4	(Egypt) Zamalek	6	1	1	4	4	7	−3	4	

Source: CAF
Rules for classification: Group stage tiebreakers

=== Matches ===
18 May 2014 1	Vita Club (Democratic Republic of the Congo)	2–1	(Egypt) Zamalek	Stade Tata Raphaël, Kinshasa, Democratic Republic of the Congo
15:30 UTC+1	Mubele 18'; Ngudikana 80'		Zakaria 76'	Attendance: 5,000; Referee: Bakary Gassama (Gambia)

24 May 2014 2	Zamalek (Egypt)	2–1	(Sudan) Al-Hilal	30 June Stadium, Cairo, Egypt
19:00 UTC+3	Dominique 5'; Abdel-Shafy 81'		Careca 25'	Referee: Rajindraparsad Seechurn (Mauritius)

8 June 2014 3	TP Mazembe (Democratic Republic of the Congo)	1–0	(Egypt) Zamalek	Stade TP Mazembe, Lubumbashi
	Kalaba 13'			Referee: Joseph Lamptey (Ghana)

27 July 2014 4	Zamalek (Egypt)	0–0	(Democratic Republic of the Congo) TP Mazembe	Alexandria Stadium, Alexandria
20:30 UTC+2		Report		Referee: Djamel Haimoudi (Algeria)

10 August 2014 5	Zamalek (Egypt)	0–1	(Democratic Republic of the Congo) AS Vita Club	Alexandria Stadium, Alexandria
20:30 UTC+3		Report	Sentamu 55'	Referee: Badara Diatta (Senegal)

22 August 2014 6	Al-Hilal (Sudan)	2–1	(Egypt) Zamalek	Al-Hilal Stadium, Omdurman
20:00 UTC+3	Bisha 35'; Almadina 84'		Fathi 61'	Referee: Hamada Nampiandraza (Madagascar)

== 2014 Egypt Cup ==
21 June 2014 Round of 16	Zamalek	2–1	Ghazl El Mahalla	Cairo
17:00 UTC+3	Ali 33'; Dominique 45' (pen.)		Mahrous 82'	Stadium: Cairo Stadium; Attendance: 0 Referee: Mohamed Hanafi

10 July 2014 Quarterfinals	Zamalek	1–0	Haras El-Hodood	Alexandria
21:30 UTC+2	Fathi 86'			Stadium: Alexandria Stadium; Attendance: 0 Referee: Sherif Rashwan

14 July 2014 SemiFinals	Zamalek	0–0 (5–4 p)	Wadi Degla	Cairo
21:30 UTC+2				Stadium: 30 June Stadium; Attendance: 0 Referee: Sameer Mahmoud Othman
	Penalties
	Ali (penalty scored); Emam (penalty missed); Abdel-Shafy (penalty scored); Ibrahim (penalty missed); Fathi (penalty scored); Zakaria (penalty scored); Soliman (penalty scored)		(penalty missed) Talaat; (penalty missed) El-Houssary; (penalty scored) Abdel Fattah; (penalty scored) El-Merghany; (penalty scored) Feisal; (penalty scored) Salem; (penalty missed) Mensah

19 July 2014 Final	Zamalek	1–0	Smouha	Cairo
21:30 UTC+2	Emam 89'			Stadium: 30 June Stadium; Attendance: 200; Referee: Gehad Grisha (Egypt)
