= 2012–13 Zamalek SC season =

Zamalek
2012–13 season
- Chairman: Mamdouh Abbas
- Manager: (Brazil) Jorvan Vieira
- Egyptian Premier League: Not completed
- Egypt Cup: Winner (Note: The tournament from 2nd round was continued with following season squad.)
- 2013 CAF Champions League: Eliminated (Round 8)
Home colours	Away colours

The 2012–2013 season was Zamalek Sporting Club's 102nd season of football and 57th consecutive season in the Egyptian Premier League. The club also played in the CAF Champions League.

== Team kit ==
The 2012-2013 home kit was the classic Zamalek home kit, which featured golden trims and two parallel horizontal red lines. The away kit was all pink with grey trims, and grey shorts.

Home	Away	Goalkeeper 1	Goalkeeper 2	Goalkeeper 3

== Squad ==
As of 14 May 2015.

Egyptian Football Association (EFA) rules are that a team may only have 3 foreign born players in the squad.
The Squad Has 25 Players Registered as Professionals and 5 Players Registered (-U23) and 2 Players of the Youth academy

No.	Nationality	Name	Age
Goalkeepers
16	(Egypt)	Abdelwahed El-Sayed (captain)	35
1	(Egypt)	Ahmed El-Shenawy	21
21	(Egypt)	Gennesh	25
Defenders
2	(Egypt)	Salah Soliman	22
4	(Egypt)	Ahmed Samir	31
7	(Egypt)	Hazem Emam	25
34	(Egypt)	Omar Gaber	20
6	(Egypt)	Sabry Raheel	25
13	(Egypt)	Mohamed Abdel-Shafy	27
26	(Egypt)	Hamada Tolba	31
14	(Egypt)	Ahmed Magdy	26
20	(Egypt)	Mahmoud Fathallah	30
28	(Egypt)	Ahmed El Sayed	
Midfielders
3	(Cameroon)	Alexis Enam	25
5	(Egypt)	Ibrahim Salah	25
11	(Egypt)	Ahmed Eid Abdel Malek	24
15	(Egypt)	Nour El Sayed	28
17	(Egypt)	Ahmed Hassan	30
18	(Egypt)	Islam Awad	25
24	(Egypt)	Said Mohamed Otta	20
33	(Egypt)	Mohamed Ibrahim	20
35	(Egypt)	Mahmoud El-Badry	20–21
36	(Egypt)	Youssif Hassan	20
38	(Egypt)	Ahmed Tawfik	21
Forwards
9	(Egypt)	Ahmed Gaafar	26
19	(Burkina Faso)	Abdoulaye Cissé	28
23	(Benin)	Razak Omotoyossi	27

=== Out on loan ===
Note: Flags indicate national team as defined under FIFA eligibility rules; some limited exceptions apply. Players may hold more than one non-FIFA nationality.

No.	Pos.	Nation	Player
10	MF	EGY	Shikabala (at Al Wasl FC until the end of season 2012–13)
36	MF	EGY	Hossam Arafat (at Petrojet until the end of season 2012–13)
8	DF	EGY	Hani Saied (at ِAl Dhofar until the end of season 2012–13)
12	MF	EGY	Ahmed El Merghany (at Al Tadamun until the end of season 2012–13)
30	MF	EGY	Ahmed Kattawi (at Tala'ea El-Gaish until the end of season 2012–13)
22	MF	EGY	Alaa Ali (at Telephonat Bani Sweif until the end of season 2012–13)

== Friendlies ==
=== Pre-season friendlies ===
16 May 2012	Zamalek	1–1	Ismaily	Al Kuwait Sports Club Stadium, Kuwait City
22:00 UTC+3	Ahmed Samir 86'		Gamal 17'

=== Match World Cup 2013 ===
16 January 2013	Shakhtar Donetsk (Ukraine)	3–2	(Egypt) Zamalek	Zayed Sports City Stadium, Abu Dhabi, UAE
20:00 UTC+4	Eduardo da Silva 9'; Darijo Srna 43'; Henrikh Mkhitaryan 89'	Report	Ahmed Hassan 17'; Mohamed Ibrahim 21'	Attendance: 550; Referee: Ali Hasan Kareem (UAE)

19 January 2013	Zenit St. Petersburg (Russia)	0–1	(Egypt) Zamalek	Zayed Sports City Stadium, Abu Dhabi, UAE
20:00 UTC+4		Report	Ahmed Samir 34'	Attendance: 100; Referee: Hamed Ali Youssef (UAE)

=== Mid-season friendlies ===
24 May 2013	Khaitan (Kuwait)	0–6	(Egypt) Zamalek	Khaitan Stadium, Kuwait
			Gaafar 19', 45', 50'; Awad 25'; Youssif 70', 86'
Note: Hamed Al Shaibani retired match.

== Egyptian Premier League ==
=== Group 2 ===
Pos	Team	Pld	W	D	L	GF	GA	GD	Pts	Qualification
1	Zamalek (Q)	15	13	0	2	26	11	+15	39	Qualification for Championship Playoff
2	Ismaily (Q)	16	9	3	4	20	11	+9	30	Qualification for Championship Playoff
3	Ittihad El Shorta	15	6	4	5	21	15	+6	22	

Source: RSSSF
Rules for classification: 1) points; 2) goal difference; 3) number of goals scored.
(Q) Qualified for the phase indicated

==== Results by round ====
Round	1	2	3	4	5	6	7	8	9	10	11	12	13	14	15	16	17	18
Ground	H	A	H	A	H	A	–	H	A	A	H	A	H	A	H	–	A	H
Result	W	W	W	W	W	W	B	W	W	L	W	W	L	W	W	B	W	
Position	1	1	1	1	1	1	1	1	1	1	1	1	1	1	1	1	1	1

Updated to match(es) played on 16 March 2013. Source: fifa.com
A = Away; H = Home; B = Bye; W = Win; D = Draw; L = Loss

==== Results summary ====
Overall								Home						Away					
Pld	W	D	L	GF	GA	GD	Pts	W	D	L	GF	GA	GD	W	D	L	GF	GA	GD
15	13	0	2	26	11	+15	39	5	0	1	9	3	+6	8	0	1	17	8	+9

Last updated: 22 Mar 2013.
Source: 2012–13 Egyptian Premier League

==== Matches ====
2 February 2013 1	Zamalek	2–0	Al Ittihad Al Sakandary	30 June Stadium, Cairo
19:30 UTC+2	Gaber 74'; Gaafar 78'			Attendance: 0

9 February 2013 2	Ittihad El Shorta	2–3	Zamalek	30 June Stadium, Cairo
17:00 UTC+2	Mohamed Maged 23'; Khaled Qamar 43'		Abdel-Shafy 17'; Mohamed Ibrahim 45'; Gaafar 89'	Attendance: 0

13 February 2013 3	Zamalek	1–0	El Dakhleya	30 June Stadium, Cairo
17:00 UTC+2	Emam 76'			Attendance: 0

21 February 2013 4	Petrojet	0–3	Zamalek	30 June Stadium, Cairo
15:15 UTC+2			Cissé 45'; Gaafar 72'; Abdel Malek 83'	Attendance: 0

25 February 2013 5	Zamalek	2–1	Al Mokawloon Al Arab	30 June Stadium, Cairo
20:00 UTC+2	Samir 62'; Abdel-Shafy 70'		Mohamed Farok 41'	Attendance: 0

8 March 2013 6	El Entag El Harby	1–3	Zamalek	Al-Salam Stadium, Cairo
20:00 UTC+2	Kareem Qarda 52'		Samir 11'; Nour El Sayed 49'; Gaber 90+2'	Attendance: 0

19 March 2013 9	Tala'ea El Gaish	1–2	Zamalek	Cairo Military Academy Stadium, Cairo
20:00 UTC+2	Gomaa Mashour 90+2'		Ahmed Hassan 16'; Mohamed Ibrahim 64'	Attendance: 0 Referee: Ahmad Sabahi

29 March 2013 8	Zamalek	2–0	Ismaily	30 June Stadium, Cairo
20:00 UTC+2	Gaafar 63'; Mohamed Ibrahim 65'			Attendance: 0 Referee: Gehad Grisha

13 April 2013 10	Al Ittihad Al Sakandary	v	Zamalek	Borg El Arab Stadium, Alexandria
15:30 UTC+2				Attendance: 0
Note: Postponed due to the military stadiums crisis.

24 April 2013 11	Zamalek	1–0	Ittihad El Shorta	30 June Stadium, Cairo
18:00 UTC+2	Mohamed Ibrahim 64'			Attendance: 0

28 April 2013 12	El Dakhleya	1–2	Zamalek	30 June Stadium, Cairo
15:30 UTC+2	Ahmed Samir 61'		Ahmed Hassan 32'; Cissé 88'	Attendance: 0

9 May 2013 13	Zamalek	1–2	Petrojet	30 June Stadium, Cairo
20:00 UTC+2	Cissé 38'		Koffi 31'; Ragab 87'	Attendance: 0 Referee: Samir Othman

13 May 2013 14	Al Mokawloon Al Arab	0–1	Zamalek	30 June Stadium, Cairo
17:45 UTC+2			Cissé 79'	Attendance: 0 Referee: Mohamed Farouk

17 May 2013 15	Zamalek	1–0	El Entag El Harby	30 June Stadium, Cairo
20:00 UTC+2	Abdel Malek 85' (pen.)			Attendance: 0

27 May 2013 10	Al Ittihad Al Sakandary	2–0	Zamalek	Borg El Arab Stadium, Alexandria
18:30 UTC+2	El-Morsy 81', 84'			Attendance: 0

23 June 2013 17	Ismaily	1–2	Zamalek	30 June Stadium, Cairo
18:00 UTC+2	Khairy 27'		Mohamed Ibrahim 33' (pen.); Ahmed Hassan 59'	Attendance: 0

30 June 2013 18	Zamalek	v	Tala'ea El Gaish	30 June Stadium, Cairo
UTC+2				Attendance: 0

Note: The rest of the tournament was Cancelled due to 2013 Egyptian coup d'état.

== Egypt Cup ==
21 May 2013 Round of 32	Zamalek	3–0	Tersana	30 June Stadium, Cairo
18:00 UTC+2	Mendomo 11'; Abdel Malek 21'; Magdy 45' (pen.)			Attendance: 0 Referee: Mohamed Basiony

27 June 2013 Round of 16	Zamalek	v	Tanta
UTC+2				Attendance: 0

Note: The rest of the tournament was held during the following season due to 2013 Egyptian coup d'état.

== CAF Champions League ==
=== Preliminary round ===
17 February 2013 First leg	Zamalek (Egypt)	7–0	(Chad) Gazelle	Borg El Arab Stadium, Alexandria
18:00 UTC+2	Gaafar 15', 45+3'; Ibrahim 28', 83'; Cissé 76', 88'; Hassan 81'	Report		Attendance: 4000; Referee: Med Said Kordi (Tunisia)

2 March 2013 Second leg	Gazelle (Chad)	0–0 (0–7 agg.)	(Egypt) Zamalek	Stade Omnisports Idriss Mahamat Ouya, N'Djamena
15:00 UTC+1		Report		Referee: Roponat Mbourou (Gabon)

Zamalek won 7–0 on aggregate and advanced to the first round.

=== First round ===
15 March 2013	Zamalek (Egypt)	1–0	(Democratic Republic of the Congo) AS Vita Club	Borg El Arab Stadium, Alexandria
	Gaafar 67'			Attendance: 3000; Referee: Gervais Munyanziza (Rwanda)

6 April 2013	AS Vita Club (Democratic Republic of the Congo)	0–0 (0–1 agg.)	(Egypt) Zamalek	Stade des Martyrs, Kinshasa
				Referee: Joshua Bondo (Botswana)

Zamalek won 1–0 on aggregate and advanced to the second round.

=== Second round ===
20 April 2013	Zamalek (Egypt)	1–1	(Ethiopia) Saint George	30 June Stadium, Cairo
	Cissé 83'		Oukri 67'	Referee: Rajindraparsad Seechurn (Mauritius)

5 May 2013	Saint George (Ethiopia)	2–2 (3 – 3a agg.)	(Egypt) Zamalek	Addis Ababa Stadium, Addis Ababa
	Bekele 14'; Isinde 43'		Cissé 2', 87'	Attendance: 40,000; Referee: Janny Sikazwe (Zambia)
Note: 3–3 on aggregate, Zamalek won on away goals.

Zamalek advanced to the group stage.
