= 2011–12 Zamalek SC season =

Zamalek
2011–12 season
- Chairman: (Egypt) Galal Ibrahim/ Mamdouh Abbas
- Manager: (Egypt) Hassan Shehata
- Egyptian Premier League: Not completed
- Egypt Cup: Canceled
- 2012 CAF Champions League: Eliminated (Round 8)
Home colours	Away colours

During the 2011–12 season, the football team representing Zamalek Sporting Club of Giza, Egypt were eliminated in the eighth round of the 2012 CAF Champions League. The domestic competitions they entered, the Egyptian Premier League and the Egypt Cup, were abandoned following the Port Said Stadium disaster of 1 February 2012.

== Squad ==
Note: Flags indicate national team as defined under FIFA eligibility rules; some limited exceptions apply. Players may hold more than one non-FIFA nationality.

No.	Pos.	Nation	Player
1	GK	EGY	Mahmoud Abdel Rahim
4	DF	EGY	Ahmed Samir
5	MF	EGY	Ibrahim Salah
6	DF	EGY	Sabry Raheel
7	MF	EGY	Hazem Mohamed Emam
8	MF	EGY	Hani Saied
11	FW	EGY	Ahmed Gaafar
13	DF	EGY	Mohamed Abdel-Shafy
15	MF	EGY	Nour El Sayed
16	GK	EGY	Abdelwahed El-Sayed (captain)

No.	Pos.	Nation	Player
17	MF	EGY	Ahmed Hassan
18	MF	EGY	Islam Awad
20	DF	EGY	Mahmoud Fathallah
22	MF	EGY	Alaa Ali
23	FW	BEN	Razak Omotoyossi
24	MF	EGY	Said Mohamed Otta
25	MF	CMR	Alexis Enam
29	DF	EGY	Salah Soliman
33	MF	EGY	Mohamed Ibrahim
34	MF	EGY	Omar Gaber
38	MF	EGY	Ahmed Tawfik
19	FW	EGY	Hussein Hamdy

=== Out on loan ===
Note: Flags indicate national team as defined under FIFA eligibility rules; some limited exceptions apply. Players may hold more than one non-FIFA nationality.

No.	Pos.	Nation	Player
12	MF	EGY	Ahmed El Merghany (at Telephonat Bani Sweif until the end of season 2011–12)
28	DF	EGY	Ahmed El-Sayed (at Union Alexandria until the end of season 2011–12)
30	MF	EGY	Ahmed Kattawi (at Union Alexandria until the end of season 2011–12)
36	MF	EGY	Hossam Arafat (at Petrojet until the end of season 2011–12)

No.	Pos.	Nation	Player
—	DF	EGY	Ahmed Ghanem Soltan (at Telephonat Bani Sweif until the end of season 2011–12)
—	DF	EGY	Mahmoud El-Badry (at Telephonat Bani Sweif until the end of season 2011–12)
—	DF	EGY	Mostafa Hegab (at Ghazl El-Mehalla until the end of season 2011–12)
—	FW	EGY	Hassan Youssif (at Telephonat Bani Sweif until the end of season 2011–12)
10	MF	EGY	Shikabala

== Friendlies ==
=== Mid-season friendlies ===
10 November 2011	Zamalek (Egypt)	1–4	(Spain) Atlético Madrid	Cairo Stadium
20:00 UTC+2	Mido 25' (pen.)		Salvio 12', 14'; Diego 51', 74'	Attendance: 44490; Referee: Samir Osman (Egypt)
Note: Zamalek SC Centennial.

== League table ==
Pos	Team	Pld	W	D	L	GF	GA	GD	Pts
2	Al Ahly	15	11	3	1	28	12	+16	36
3	Zamalek	14	10	2	2	27	11	+16	32
4	Al Masry	15	7	5	3	17	10	+7	26

Updated to match(es) played on 1 February 2012. Source: Egyptian League Standings
Rules for classification: 1) points; 2) goal difference; 3) number of goals scored.
Qualifications/regulations based on rules agreed to preseason; an official decision about whether these rules still apply now that the season has been cancelled has not been made.
