= 2013 Egypt Cup final =

- Event: 2013 Egypt Cup
Zamalek	Wadi Degla
3	0
- Date: 9 November 2013
- Venue: El Gouna Stadium, El Gouna
- Man of the Match: Abdelwahed El-Sayed
- Referee: Mohamed Farouk (Egypt)
- Attendance: 4,000
- Weather: Sunny; 21 °C (70 °F)

The 2013 Egypt Cup tournament came to a close on 9 November 2013 when Zamalek played Wadi Degla at El Gouna Stadium in El Gouna.

it was Zamalek's 35th final, It was Wadi Degla's first final, Zamalek won the game 3–0, claiming the cup for the 22nd time.

== Route to the final ==
Zamalek		Round	Wadi Degla
Opponent	Result	2013 Egypt Cup	Opponent	Result
Tersana	3–0	Round of 32	Kahrbaa Talkha	3–0
Tanta	4–0	Round of 16	Saed El-Mahla	3–0
El-Entag El-Harby	3–0	Quarterfinals	ENPPI	2–2 (5–4 p)
Tala'ea El-Gaish	2–1	Semifinals	Ismaily	0–0 (8–7 p)

== Game description ==
=== Match details ===
9 November 2013
14:30 UTC+2

Zamalek	3–0	Wadi Degla
Gaafar 13', 57'; Shikabala 65'	Report

El Gouna Stadium
Attendance: 4,000
Referee: Mohamed Farouk (Egypt)

Zamalek	Wadi Degla

Zamalek:
GK	16	(Egypt) Abdelwahed El-Sayed (c)
RB	7	(Egypt) Hazem Emam		(substituted off) 76'
CB	22	(Egypt) Hamada Tolba
CB	2	(Egypt) Salah Soliman
LB	13	(Egypt) Mohamed Abdel-Shafy	(yellow card) ?'
CM	15	(Egypt) Nour El Sayed
CM	12	(Egypt) Ahmed Tawfik
RW	10	(Egypt) Shikabala
AM	11	(Egypt) Moamen Zakaria		(substituted off) 71'
LW	14	(Egypt) Ahmed Eid Abdel Malek		(substituted off) 76'
CF	9	(Egypt) Ahmed Gaafar
Substitutions:
CM	17	(Egypt) Ahmed Hassan		(substituted on) 71'
RB	4	(Egypt) Ahmed Samir		(substituted on) 76'
LW	5	(Egypt) Mohamed Ibrahim		(substituted on) 76'
Manager:
(Egypt) Helmy Toulan

Wadi Degla:
GK	16	(Egypt) Haytham Mohamed
RB	6	(Egypt) Mohamed El-Hossary
CB	90	(Egypt) Ragab Nabil
CB	3	(Egypt) Mohamed Abdel Fattah	(yellow card) ?'
LB	13	(Egypt) El Sayed Salem
CM	22	(Ghana) Akwetey Mensah
CM	24	(Egypt) Hamed Faisal		(substituted off) 76'
RW	25	(Egypt) Mohab Said
AM	7	(Egypt) Mostafa Talaat		(substituted off) 70'
LW	20	(Egypt) Abdallah Bika		(substituted off) 46'
CF	9	(Ethiopia) Saladin Said
Substitutions:
MF	14	(Egypt) Ahmed Magdy	(yellow card) ?'	(substituted on) 76'
MF	77	(Egypt) Karim Hafez		(substituted on) 70'
FW	10	(Syria) Abdul Fattah Al Agha		(substituted on) 46'
Manager:
(Egypt) Hany Ramzy

Man of the Match:
Abdelwahed El-Sayed

Assistant referees:
Tahseen Al-Sadat
Sherif Salah
Fourth official:
Mohamed Marouf
