= 2014 Egypt Cup final =

- Event: 2014 Egypt Cup
Zamalek	Smouha
1	0
- Date: 19 July 2014
- Venue: 30 June Stadium, Cairo
- Man of the Match: Mohamed Abdel-Shafy
- Referee: Gehad Grisha (Egypt)
- Attendance: 200
- Weather: Clear; 28 °C (82 °F)

The 2014 Egypt Cup final decided the winner of the 2014 Egypt Cup, the 81st season of Egypt's premier football cup. It was played on 19 July 2014 at the 30 June Stadium in Cairo

In the final, Zamalek played Smouha. The winner would have earned a place in the group stage of the 2015 CAF Confederation Cup, but both teams were qualified for the Confederation Cup and Champions League via their league position.

Zamalek were the defending champions, and it was their 36th final and the third in a row, It was Smouha's first final, Zamalek won the game 1–0, claiming the cup for the 23rd time.

== Route to the final ==
Zamalek		Round	Smouha
Opponent	Result	2014 Egypt Cup	Opponent	Result
Bye		Round of 32	El-Gouna	2–1
Ghazl El Mahalla	2–1	Round of 16	Tala'ea El-Gaish	2–1
Haras El-Hodood	1–0	Quarterfinals	Ittihad El-Shorta	2–2 (5–4 p)
Wadi Degla	0–0 (5–4 p)	Semifinals	Al-Ahly	2–1

== Game description ==
=== Match details ===
19 July 2014
21:30 UTC+2

Zamalek	1 – 0	Smouha
Emam 89'	[[[Category:All articles with unsourced statements]] Report]

30 June Stadium, Cairo
Attendance: 200
Referee: Gehad Grisha (Egypt)

Zamalek	Smouha

GK	1	(Egypt) Mohamed Abou Gabal
RB	7	(Egypt) Hazem Emam (c)	(yellow card) 90'
CB	22	(Egypt) Hamada Tolba	(yellow card) 84'
CB	35	(Egypt) Yasser Ibrahim		(substituted off) 61'
CB	2	(Egypt) Salah Soliman
LB	13	(Egypt) Mohamed Abdel-Shafy
RW	6	(Egypt) Omar Gaber
CM	26	(Egypt) Mahmoud Khaled		(substituted off) 74'
CM	12	(Egypt) Ahmed Tawfik	(yellow card) 75'
LW	14	(Egypt) Mohamed Ibrahim		(substituted off) 44'
CF	23	(Egypt) Ahmed Ali
Substitutions:
AM	11	(Egypt) Moamen Zakaria		(substituted in) 44'
AM	34	(Egypt) Mostafa Fathi		(substituted in) 61'
AM	27	(Egypt) Youssef Obama		(substituted in) 74'
Manager:
(Egypt) Mido

GK	25	(Egypt) Amir Abdelhamid
RB	4	(Egypt) Ahmed Said
CB	5	(Egypt) El-Sayed Fareed
CB	13	(Egypt) Sherif Hazem
LB	8	(Egypt) Abdel-Rahman Farouk
CM	22	(Egypt) Ibrahim Abdel-Khaleq
CM	27	(Egypt) Ahmed Hommos
RW	11	(Egypt) Ahmed Hamoudi (c)
AM	3	(Egypt) Tarek Hamed	(yellow card) 21' (yellow-red card) 70'
LW	17	(Egypt) Alaa Ali
CF	10	(Egypt) Hany El-Agazy
Substitutions:
Manager:
(Egypt) Hamada Sedki			(red card) 85'

Man of the Match:
Mohamed Abdel-Shafy

Assistant referees:
Tahseen Al-Sadat
Diaa Al-Sakran
Fourth official:
Mohamed Dallas
