= Zamalek SC Centennial =

Zamalek Sporting Club Centennial
Zamalek	Atlético Madrid
(Egypt)	(Spain)
1	4
- Date: 10 November 2011
- Venue: Cairo Stadium, Cairo
- Referee: Samir Osman (Egypt)
- Attendance: 44490
- Weather: Fine

Zamalek Sporting Club Centennial was the 100 anniversary of the founding of Zamalek Sporting Club. The celebration included sporting, social and artistic events, though the main event was the friendly match against Atlético Madrid; it was delayed for more than once because of the consequences of the Egyptian revolution.

== Match details ==
10 November 2011
20:00 UTC+2

Zamalek (Egypt)	1–4	(Spain) Atlético Madrid
Mido 25' (pen.)		Salvio 12', 14'; Diego 51', 74'

Cairo Stadium
Attendance: 44490
Referee: Samir Osman (Egypt)

Zamalek	Atlético Madrid

Zamalek:
GK	16	(Egypt) Abdelwahed El-Sayed
RB	7	(Egypt) Hazem Emam	(yellow card) 49'
CB	2	(Egypt) Salah Soliman
CB	37	(Ghana) Karim Alhassan
LB	6	(Egypt) Sabry Raheel
CM	5	(Egypt) Ibrahim Salah		(substituted off) 39'
CM	12	(Egypt) Ahmed El Merghany		(substituted off) ?'
RW	38	(Egypt) Ahmed Tawfik
AM	10	(Egypt) Shikabala
LW	14	(Egypt) Mido (c)		(substituted off) 52'
CF	11	(Benin) Razak Omotoyossi		(substituted off) 52'
Substitutions:
GK	1	(Egypt) Mahmoud Abdel Rahim		(substituted on) 68'
DF	4	(Egypt) Ahmed Samir		(substituted on) ?'
DF	20	(Egypt) Mahmoud Fathallah		(substituted on) 52'
MF	17	(Egypt) Ahmed Hassan		(substituted on) 39'
FW	9	(Egypt) Ahmed Gaafar		(substituted on) 52'
Manager:
(Egypt) Hassan Shehata

Atlético Madrid:
GK	16	(Spain) Sergio Asenjo		(substituted off) 77'
RB	24	(Spain) Jorge Pulido
CB	23	(Brazil) Miranda
CB	6	(Brazil) Filipe Luís
LB	12	(Brazil) Paulo Assunção
CM	20	(Spain) Juanfran		(substituted off) 77'
CM	14	(Spain) Gabi
RW	15	(Portugal) Pizzi		(substituted off) 46'
AM	5	(Portugal) Tiago		(substituted off) 46'
LW	10	(Spain) José Antonio Reyes	(yellow card) 26'
CF	8	(Argentina) Eduardo Salvio
Substitutions:
GK	1	(Spain) Joel		(substituted on) 77'
DF	17	(Portugal) Sílvio		(substituted on) 77'
CM	22	(Brazil) Diego		(substituted on) 46'
FW	7	(Spain) Adrián		(substituted on) 46'
Manager:
(Spain) Gregorio Manzano

Man of the Match:

Assistant referees:
Ahmed Abu El-Ela (Egypt)
Tamer Dorry (Egypt)

Fourth official:
Saeed Abd El-Ghaffar (Egypt)
