= List of Zamalek SC seasons =

Since its foundation in 1911, the football team representing Zamalek Sporting Club of Giza, Egypt has won the Egyptian Premier League 14 times, the Egypt Cup 28 times and the Egyptian Super Cup four times. It has also scored many successful seasons in the Egyptian Premier League. On the international stage the club has frequently participated in the CAF Champions League and other tournaments run by the Confederation of African Football (CAF).

== Seasons ==
Season	Premier League	Egypt Cup	Super Cup	CAF Champions League	African Cup Winners' Cup CAF Confederation Cup	CAF Super Cup
1921–22	Started in 1948	Winners	Started in 2001	Started in 1964	Started in 1975	Started in 1993
1922–23	Started in 1948	Quarter-Finals	Started in 2001	Started in 1964	Started in 1975	Started in 1993
1923–24	Started in 1948	-	Started in 2001	Started in 1964	Started in 1975	Started in 1993
1924–25	Started in 1948	Withdrew	Started in 2001	Started in 1964	Started in 1975	Started in 1993
1925–26	Started in 1948	-	Started in 2001	Started in 1964	Started in 1975	Started in 1993
1926–27	Started in 1948	Quarter-Finals	Started in 2001	Started in 1964	Started in 1975	Started in 1993
1927–28	Started in 1948	Runner-up	Started in 2001	Started in 1964	Started in 1975	Started in 1993
1928–29	Started in 1948	Quarter-Finals	Started in 2001	Started in 1964	Started in 1975	Started in 1993
1929–30	Started in 1948	Quarter-Finals	Started in 2001	Started in 1964	Started in 1975	Started in 1993
1930–31	Started in 1948	Runner-up	Started in 2001	Started in 1964	Started in 1975	Started in 1993
1931–32	Started in 1948	Winners	Started in 2001	Started in 1964	Started in 1975	Started in 1993
1932–33	Started in 1948	Runner-up	Started in 2001	Started in 1964	Started in 1975	Started in 1993
1933–34	Started in 1948	Runner-up	Started in 2001	Started in 1964	Started in 1975	Started in 1993
1934–35	Started in 1948	Winners	Started in 2001	Started in 1964	Started in 1975	Started in 1993
1935–36	Started in 1948	Semi-finals	Started in 2001	Started in 1964	Started in 1975	Started in 1993
1936–37	Started in 1948	Quarter-Finals	Started in 2001	Started in 1964	Started in 1975	Started in 1993
1937–38	Started in 1948	Winner	Started in 2001	Started in 1964	Started in 1975	Started in 1993
1938–39	Started in 1948	Semi-finals	Started in 2001	Started in 1964	Started in 1975	Started in 1993
1939–40	Started in 1948	Quarter-Finals	Started in 2001	Started in 1964	Started in 1975	Started in 1993
1940–41	Started in 1948	Winners	Started in 2001	Started in 1964	Started in 1975	Started in 1993
1941–42	Started in 1948	Runner-up	Started in 2001	Started in 1964	Started in 1975	Started in 1993
1942–43	Started in 1948	Shared Winners	Started in 2001	Started in 1964	Started in 1975	Started in 1993
1943–44	Started in 1948	Winners	Started in 2001	Started in 1964	Started in 1975	Started in 1993
1944–45	Started in 1948	Semi-finals	Started in 2001	Started in 1964	Started in 1975	Started in 1993
1945–46	Started in 1948	Quarter-Finals	Started in 2001	Started in 1964	Started in 1975	Started in 1993
1946–47	Started in 1948	Quarter-Finals	Started in 2001	Started in 1964	Started in 1975	Started in 1993
1947–48	Started in 1948	Runner-up	Started in 2001	Started in 1964	Started in 1975	Started in 1993
1948–49	Fifth place	Runner-up	Started in 2001	Started in 1964	Started in 1975	Started in 1993
1949–50	Third place	Semi-finals	Started in 2001	Started in 1964	Started in 1975	Started in 1993
1950–51	Runner-up	Semi-finals	Started in 2001	Started in 1964	Started in 1975	Started in 1993
1951–52	not held	Winners	Started in 2001	Started in 1964	Started in 1975	Started in 1993
1952–53	Runner-up	Runner-up	Started in 2001	Started in 1964	Started in 1975	Started in 1993
1953–54	Runner-up	Semi-finals	Started in 2001	Started in 1964	Started in 1975	Started in 1993
1954–55	not finished	Winners	Started in 2001	Started in 1964	Started in 1975	Started in 1993
1955–56	Runner-up	Semi-finals	Started in 2001	Started in 1964	Started in 1975	Started in 1993
1956–57	Runner-up	Winners	Started in 2001	Started in 1964	Started in 1975	Started in 1993
1957–58	Runner-up	Winners	Started in 2001	Started in 1964	Started in 1975	Started in 1993
1958–59	Runner-up	Winners	Started in 2001	Started in 1964	Started in 1975	Started in 1993
1959–60	Winners	Winners	Started in 2001	Started in 1964	Started in 1975	Started in 1993
1960–61	Runner-up	Semi-finals	Started in 2001	Started in 1964	Started in 1975	Started in 1993
1961–62	Runner-up	Winners	Started in 2001	Started in 1964	Started in 1975	Started in 1993
1962–63	Runner-up	Runner-up	Started in 2001	Started in 1964	Started in 1975	Started in 1993
1963–64	Winners	Semi-finals	Started in 2001	Started in 1964	Started in 1975	Started in 1993
1964–65	Winners	Quarter-Finals	Started in 2001	Did not enter	Started in 1975	Started in 1993
1965–66	Runner-up	Quarter-Finals	Started in 2001	Did not enter	Started in 1975	Started in 1993
1966–67	Fourth place	Round of 32	Started in 2001	Did not enter	Started in 1975	Started in 1993
1968–69	not held	not held	Started in 2001	Did not enter	Started in 1975	Started in 1993
1968–69	not held	not held	Started in 2001	Did not enter	Started in 1975	Started in 1993
1969–70	not held	not held	Started in 2001	Did not enter	Started in 1975	Started in 1993
1970–71	not finished	not held	Started in 2001	Did not enter	Started in 1975	Started in 1993
1971–72	Cancelled	not held	Started in 2001	Did not enter	Started in 1975	Started in 1993
1972–73	Runner-up	Round of 32	Started in 2001	Did not enter	Started in 1975	Started in 1993
1973–74	not finished	not finished	Started in 2001	Did not enter	Started in 1975	Started in 1993
1974–75	Fifth place	Winners	Started in 2001	Did not enter	Did not enter	Started in 1993
1975–76	Third place	Semi-Finals	Started in 2001	Did not enter	Semi-final	Started in 1993
1976–77	Runner-up	Winners	Started in 2001	Did not enter	Did not enter	Started in 1993
1977–78	Winners	Runner-up	Started in 2001	Did not enter	Quarter-Finals	Started in 1993
1978–79	Runner-up	Winners	Started in 2001	Quarter-Finals	Did not enter	Started in 1993
1979–80	Runner-up	not held	Started in 2001	Did not enter	Did not enter	Started in 1993
1980–81	Runner-up	Quarter-Finals	Started in 2001	Did not enter	Did not enter	Started in 1993
1981–82	Runner-up	Semi-Finals	Started in 2001	Did not enter	Did not enter	Started in 1993
1982–83	Runner-up	Quarter-Finals	Started in 2001	Did not enter	Did not enter	Started in 1993
1983–84	Winners	Quarter-Finals	Started in 2001	Winners	Did not enter	Started in 1993
1984–85	Runner-up	Quarter-Finals	Started in 2001	Semi-Finals	Did not enter	Started in 1993
1985–86	Runner-up	Quarter-Finals	Started in 2001	Winners	Did not enter	Started in 1993
1986–87	Runner-up	not held	Started in 2001	Quarter-Finals	Did not enter	Started in 1993
1987–88	Winners	Winners	Started in 2001	Did not enter	Did not enter	Started in 1993
1988–89	Runner-up	Quarter-Finals	Started in 2001	Round of 32	Did not enter	Started in 1993
1989–90	not finished	Semi-Finals	Started in 2001	Did not enter	Did not enter	Started in 1993
1990–91	Third place	Semi-Finals	Started in 2001	Did not enter	Did not enter	Started in 1993
1991–92	Winners	Runner-up	Started in 2001	Did not enter	Did not enter	Started in 1993
1992–93	Winners	Round of 16	Started in 2001	Winners	Did not enter	Did not enter
1993–94	Third place	not held	Started in 2001	Runner-up	Did not enter	Winners
1994–95	Runner-up	Quarter-Finals	Started in 2001	Did not enter	Did not enter	Did not enter
1995–96	Runner-up	Quarter-Finals	Started in 2001	Winners	Did not enter	Did not enter
1996–97	Runner-up	Quarter-Finals	Started in 2001	Quarter-Finals	Did not enter	Winners
1997–98	Runner-up	Round of 32	Started in 2001	Did not enter	Did not enter	Did not enter
1998–99	Runner-up	Winners	Started in 2001	Did not enter	Did not enter	Did not enter
1999–00	Third place	Semifinal	Started in 2001	Did not enter	Winners	Did not enter
2000–01	Winners	Round of 16	Winners	Did not enter	Quarter-Finals	Runner-up
2001–02	Third place	Winners	Winners	Winners	Did not enter	Did not enter
2002–03	Winners	Quarter-Finals	Runner-up	Round of 16	Did not enter	Winners
2003–04	Winners	Round of 16	Runner-up	Round of 32	Did not enter	Did not enter
2004–05	Sixth Place	Quarter-Finals	Did not enter	Semi-Finals	Did not enter	Did not enter
2005–06	Runner-up	Runner-up	Did not enter	Did not enter	Did not enter	Did not enter
2006–07	Runner-up	Runner-up	Did not enter	Round of 32	Did not enter	Did not enter
2007–08	Third place	Winners	Runner-up	Quarter-Finals	Did not enter	Did not enter
2008–09	Sixth Place	Round of 32	Did not enter	Did not enter	Did not enter	Did not enter
2009–10	Runner-up	Round of 16	Did not enter	Did not enter	Did not enter	Did not enter
2010–11	Runner-up	Runner-up	Did not enter	Round of 32	Did not enter	Did not enter
2011–12	not finished	not held	Did not enter	Quarter-Finals	Did not enter	Did not enter
2012–13	not finished	Winners	Did not enter	Quarter-Finals	Did not enter	Did not enter
2013–14	Third place	Winners	not held	Quarter-Finals	Did not enter	Did not enter
2014–15	Winners	Winners	Runner-up	Did not enter	Semi-Finals	Did not enter
2015–16	Runner-up	Winners	Winners	Runner-up	Did not enter	Did not enter
2016–17	Third place	Semi-finals	Did not enter	Groups Stage	Did not enter	Did not enter
2017–18	Fourth place	Winners	Runner-up	Round of 32	Did not enter	Did not enter
2018–19	Runner-up	Winners	Winners	Did not enter	Winners	Winners
2019–20	Runner-up	Semi-finals	Did not enter	Runner-up	Did not enter	Did not enter
