= Arafa El Sayed =

Egyptian footballer (born 1988)

Arafa El-Sayed
Personal information
- Full name: Arafa El-Sayed Mohamed Shalaby
- Date of birth: 23 October 1988 (age 38)
- Place of birth: Fayoum, Egypt
- Height: 1.87 m (6 ft 2 in)
- Position: Center forward

Youth career
- Telephonat Beni Suef

Senior career*
Years	Team	Apps	(Gls)
2009–2013	Gouna	68	(8)
2013–2014	Zamalek	6	(0)
2014–2016	Al-Gaish	52	(15)
2016–2017	Wadi Degla	26	(6)
2017–2020	ENPPI	38	(8)
2020–2021	Smouha	12	(0)
2021–2022	El Sharqia Dokhan	6	(0)

International career
2017	Egypt	1	(0)
- * Club domestic league appearances and goals

Arafa El-Sayed (Arabic: عرفة السيد; born 23 October 1988) is an Egyptian footballer who plays for Wadi Degla as a center forward.

== Honors ==
Zamalek SC:

- Egypt Cup: 2012–13
