= Abdelaziz Tawfik =

Egyptian footballer (born 1986)

Personal information
- Full name: Abdelaziz Tawfik Mohamed Hassan
- Date of birth: 24 May 1986 (age 40)
- Place of birth: Cairo, Egypt
- Height: 1.72 m (5 ft 8 in)
- Positions: Midfielder; fullback

Team information
- Current team: Ghazl El Mahalla
- Number: 19

Senior career*
Years	Team	Apps	(Gls)
2005–2006	El Mansoura	5	(1)
2006–2011	ENPPI	65	(3)
2011–2014	Al-Masry	22	(1)
2012–2013	→ Smouha (loan)	13	(0)
2014–2018	Tala'ea El Gaish	98	(2)
2018–2019	Ghazl El Mahalla		

International career
2008–2009	Egypt	7	(0)
- * Club domestic league appearances and goals as of 17:55, 11 May 2019 (UTC)

Abdelaziz Tawfik Mohamed Hassan (Arabic: عَبْد الْعَزِيز تَوْفِيق مُحَمَّد حَسَن; born 24 May 1986) is an Egyptian former footballer who played as a midfielder.

Tawfik played in the 2005 FIFA World Youth Championship in the Netherlands. He is the elder brother of Egyptian Premier League footballers Ahmed Tawfik of Pyramids and Akram Tawfik of Al Ahly.

== Club career ==
Tawfik's good spell at El Mansoura convinced ENPPI to lay an offer to win his services, although he was of little to no significance. The young midfielder quickly established himself in his new club and as a result joined the Egypt national football team. His good performances did not go unnoticed in Europe. Then he transferred to Al-Masry since the beginning of season (2011–2012).
