= Ahmed Eid Abdel Malek =

Egyptian footballer (born 1980)

Ahmed Eid
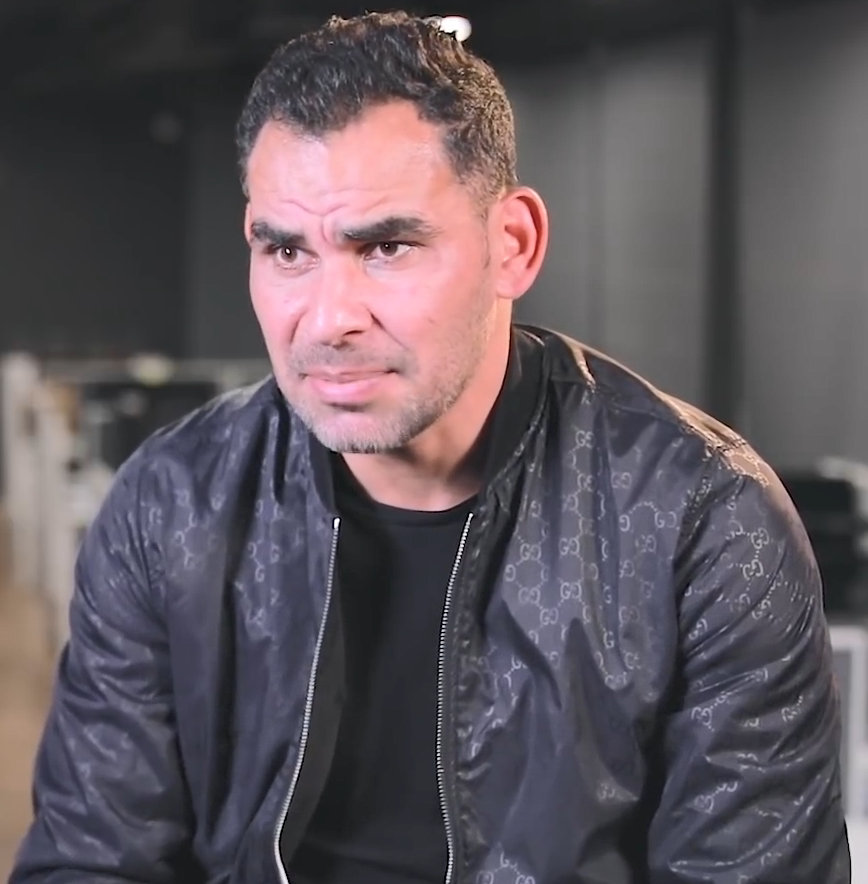

Personal information
- Full name: Ahmed Eid Abdel Malek Abdou
- Date of birth: 15 May 1980 (age 46)
- Place of birth: Egypt
- Height: 1.83 m (6 ft 0 in)
- Position: Midfielder

Team information
- Current team: Tala'ea El Geish

Senior career*
Years	Team	Apps	(Gls)
2000–2001	Zamalek	2	(0)
2001–2002	Ghazl El Mahalla SC	30	(16)
2002–2004	Aswan	33	(5)
2004–2012	Haras El-Hodood	310	(69)
2012–2015	Zamalek	45	(10)
2014–2015	→ Al-Ahly Benghazi (loan)	21	(3)
2015–2017	Tala'ea El Geish	50	(14)
2017–2018	Al Masry	9	(1)
2017–2018	Wadi Degla	15	(0)
2018–2019	El Gouna	16	(1)
Total		531	(119)

International career
2005–2013	Egypt	52	(10)
- * Club domestic league appearances and goals

Ahmed Eid Abdel Malek Abdou (Arabic: أحمد عيد عبد الملك عبده; born 15 May 1980) is an Egyptian retired football midfielder, who last played for El Gouna in the Egyptian Premier League. He is known for his time at Haras El Hodood and Zamalek. He also played for the Egypt national team. He played as an attacking midfielder.

== Club career ==
=== Early career ===
He started his career in Zamalek youth team and transferred to Aswan. He scored 5 goals in the 2003–04 Egyptian Premier League.

=== Haras El Hodood ===
He joined Alexandria's side Haras El Hodood in 2004. In October 2008, the club won the Egypt Cup after beating ENPPI on penalties in the final.

Abdel Malek is also famous for scoring the fastest goal in African football history, finding the net after only ten seconds of the 2006 CAF Confederation Cup game between Haras El Hedood and Guinean side Kalom.

=== Zamalek ===
He joined Zamalek in 2013.

After winning Egyptian Premier League, Eid announced on instagram that he will not continue his career in Zamalek. He was released from his contract.

== International career ==
Abdel Malek made his debut with Egyptian national team in 2005 against Uganda. He was included in the 2006 African Cup of Nations winning squad. The Haras El-Hodood skipper found his form with the national team again during the 2010 FIFA World Cup qualifiers in which he scored 2 decisive goals in two consecutive games against DR Congo and Djibouti, He was included in the Egypt's Squad in 2009 Confederations Cup, he was given no 10 after the dismiss of Emad Moteab due to injury.

In early 2010, Hassan Shehata, Egypt's head coach, named Abdel Malek among the Egyptian squad that will defend its title in the 2010 African Cup of Nations.

=== International goals ===
Scores and results list Egypt's goal tally first.

No	Date	Venue	Opponent	Score	Result	Competition
1.	9 February 2005	Cairo Military Academy Stadium, Cairo, Egypt	Belgium	3–0	4–0	Friendly
2.	5 June 2005	Arab Contractors Stadium, Cairo, Egypt	Sudan	6–0	6–1	2006 FIFA World Cup qualification
3.	1 June 2008	Cairo International Stadium, Cairo, Egypt	DR Congo	2–1	2–1	2010 FIFA World Cup qualification
4.	6 June 2008	El Hadj Hassan Gouled Aptidon Stadium, Djibouti City, Djibouti	Djibouti	4–0	4–0	2010 FIFA World Cup qualification
5.	12 August 2009	Cairo International Stadium, Cairo, Egypt	Guinea	3–3	3–3	Friendly
6.	27 February 2012	Thani bin Jassim Stadium, Doha, Qatar	Kenya	3–0	5–0	Friendly
7.	22 March 2013	Borg El Arab Stadium, Alexandria, Egypt	Swaziland	4–0	10–0	Friendly
8.	22 March 2013	Borg El Arab Stadium, Alexandria, Egypt	Swaziland	8–0	10–0	Friendly
9.	30 September 2013	30 June Stadium, Cairo, Egypt	Uganda	1–0	2–0	Friendly
10.	2 October 2013	30 June Stadium, Cairo, Egypt	Uganda	1–0	3–0	Friendly

== Honours ==
=== Club ===
Haras El-Hodoud

- Egypt Cup: 2008–09, 2009–10
- Egyptian Super Cup: 2010

Zamalek SC

- Egyptian Premier League: 2014–15
- Egypt Cup: 2012–13, 2013–14

=== International ===
Egypt

- African Cup of Nations: 2006, 2010
