= Sherif Hazem =

Egyptian footballer (born 1989)

Personal information
- Full name: Sherif Hazem
- Date of birth: 7 July 1989 (age 37)
- Place of birth: Egypt
- Height: 1.87 m (6 ft 2 in)
- Position: Centre back

Team information
- Current team: Masr El Makasa
- Number: 4

Youth career
- 1996–2008: Al-Ahly

Senior career*
Years	Team	Apps	(Gls)
2008–2009	Asyut Petroleum	18	(1)
2009–2010	ENPPI	3	(0)
2010–2013	Petrojet	39	(3)
2013–2014	Smouha	19	(0)
2014	Assyriska FF	?	(?)
2014–2016	Al Ahly	25	(0)
2015–2016	→ Smouha (loan)	25	(0)
2016–2017	Ismaily	15	(0)
2017	→ Al Wehda (loan)	9	(0)
2017	Al Mokawloon Al Arab	0	(0)
2018–	Masr El Makasa	15	(0)

International career
2011	Egypt	2	(0)
- * Club domestic league appearances and goals as of 23 May 2018

Sherif Hazem (born July 7, 1989) is an Egyptian footballer who plays as a center back. He currently plays for Misr Lel-Makkasa SC and has made over 150 appearances in the Egyptian Premier League.

== Club career ==
In 2008, he signed with Egyptian side Asyut Petroleum. In 2009, he moved to ENPPI, and in 2010 he signed for Petrojet. Rated as one of the best centre-backs in Egypt, the two Egyptian giants Al-Ahly and Zamalek SC have both admitted seeking his signature but were beaten to it by Smouha. After moving to Assyriska FF for a month, he terminated his contract and finally signed a big deal with Al-Ahly in August 2014.

He won the Egyptian Premier League, the Egypt Cup and the Egyptian Super Cup two times. He also won the continental CAF Confederation Cup.

He moved to Al Wehda in the Saudi Professional League on a six-month loan for 6.5 million Egyptian Pounds (approximately $400,000) and was selected in the Saudi Arabian league's team of the month twice.

== International career ==
Despite being called up for international duty several times, Hazem was regularly on the bench and has two full caps for Egypt. On 17 January 2011 he made his debut for the Egypt national football team in 2011 Nile Basin Tournament match against Uganda national football team.
