= Hamada Tolba =

Egyptian footballer (born 1981)

Personal information
- Full name: Mohamed Maher Taha Tolba
- Date of birth: 17 June 1981 (age 45)
- Place of birth: Port Said, Egypt
- Positions: Sweeper; center back; right back

Youth career
- 1995–1999: Al Merreikh

Senior career*
Years	Team	Apps	(Gls)
1999–2006	Al Merreikh		
2006–2010	Suez Cement SC	125	(1)
2010–2011	Smouha SC	29	(1)
2011–2012	Misr Lel-Makkasa	12	(0)
2013–2016	Zamalek SC	48	(2)
2016	Al-Masry SC	8	(0)
2017	ENPPI Club	11	(0)
2018–2019	Pyramids FC	26	(1)
2019	Petrojet SC	2	(0)

International career
2015–2016	Egypt	3	(0)
- * Club domestic league appearances and goals

Hamada Tolba (Arabic: حمادة طلبة; born 17 June 1981) is an Egyptian footballer who currently plays for Petrojet SC and the Egyptian National Team as a defender.

== Career ==
=== El Merreikh ===
Tolba started playing football at youth level in Merreikh FC in Port Said. Mimi Abdelrazek, the manager of Merreikh then, made Tolba play his first game with the first team in 1999–2000 season in Egyptian League B. He started his career as a right back with Merreikh. Then he played as a winger then as a defensive midfielder.

=== Suez Cement FC ===
In 2006, Tarek Yehia, the manager of Suez Cement, requested Hamada Tolba to join his team. Yehia said: "Tolba was very fast and a very good dribbler, I made use of his strength and speed as a striker and as a winger and he scored many goals".

=== Smouha SC ===
Tolba's former manager Mimi Abdelrazek asked Tolba to join Smouha SC in season 2009–2010. He played an extraordinary season helping his team to solidify its position on their first season in the Egyptian premier league. He played as a defensive midfielder.

=== Misr El-Makasa ===
Tarek Yehia, Tolba's former manager, asked Tolba to join Misr El-Makasa in 2011. Tolba joined El-Makasa for a transfer fee of L.E. 1,300,000.

=== Zamalek ===
Tolba joined Zamalek in 2013 for a transfer fee of L.E.3,000,000. He played as a centre back until Mohamed Abdel-Shafy the main left back left the club. Tolba started playing as a left back.

== International career ==
Tolba was called to join Egyptian national team for the first time in 2015 by manager Héctor Cúper in a match against chad. He was benched the entire match. On February 27, 2016, he was subbed on against Burkina Faso, marking his Egyptian National Team debut at the age of 34. He played his first official international match against Nigeria at the age of 34 years and 7 months. He made an extraordinary save, where he got Victor Moses ball from the goal line.

== Style of Play ==
Tolba did not stick to any position his entire career. He played as a striker, winger, defensive midfielder, centre back, right back, and left back. He is called The Joker by Zamalek fans because he can do any role in the field except goalkeeping. He is always praised for his effort and fighting over every ball.

== Honors ==
Zamalek SC

- Egyptian Premier League (1): 2014-15
- Egypt Cup (3): 2012-13, 2013-14, 2014-15
