= 1948–49 Farouk El Awal Club season =

Farouk
1948–49 season
- Chairman: (Egypt) Mohamed Heidar Basha
- Manager: (Egypt) Abdulrahman Fawzi
- Egyptian Premier League: 5th
- Egypt Cup: Runner-up
- Cairo League: Winners
- Top goalscorer: Younis Marei (9 goals)
Home colours

The 1948–49 season is Farouk Sporting Club's 38th season of football, and the 1st season in the Egyptian Premier League, The club also played in the Cairo league and Egypt cup.

== Egyptian Premier League ==
=== League table ===
Pos	Team	Pld	W	D	L	GF	GA	GD	Pts
3	Ismaily	20	10	5	5	25	23	+2	25
4	Al-Masry	20	8	7	5	30	28	+2	23
5	Zamalek	20	9	5	6	26	22	+4	23
6	Ittihad	20	10	2	8	42	32	+10	22
7	Al-Olympi	20	6	7	7	24	29	−5	19

Source: rsssf.com

=== Matches ===
22 October 1948 1	Farouk	5 – 1	Al-Masry
	Mohamed Amin ?'; Rostum ?', ?', ?' ?'

29 October 1948 2	Farouk	2 – 0	Port Foad

7 November 1948 3	Ismaily	2 – 0	Farouk

21 November 1948 5	Farouk	3 – 1	Younan

28 November 1948 6	El-Olympi	v	Farouk
Note: Postponed due to rain.

5 December 1948 7	Ittihad	4 – 1	Farouk

10 December 1948 8	Al-Ahly	2 – 2	Farouk
	Rostum ?'; Sakr ?'		Mekawi ?'; Osman ?'

17 December 1948 6	El-Olympi	0 – 0	Farouk

19 December 1948 9	Farouk	1 – 2	Teram

7 January 1949 10	Sekka	0 – 2	Farouk

14 January 1949 11	Farouk	3 – 0	Tersana
	Sakr 15', 49'; Nasr 58'

12 June 1949 12	Al-Masry	2 – 1	Farouk

27 March 1949 13	Port Foad	0 – 0	Farouk

17 June 1949 14	Farouk	1 – 2	Ismaily

29 January 1949 16	Farouk	2 – 2	Younan

4 March 1949 17	Farouk	3 – 0	El-Olympi
	Marei ?'; Sakr ?', ?'

13 March 1949 18	Farouk	2 – 0	Ittihad

1 April 1949 19	Farouk	1 – 0	Al-Ahly
	Marei ?'

8 April 1949 20	Teram	1 – 1	Farouk

17 April 1949 21	Farouk	5 – 0	Sekka

3 June 1949 22	Tersana	3 – 1	Farouk
			Mannas ?'

== Egypt Cup ==
First Round	Farouk	2 – 0	Beni Suef
	Othman ?', ?'

Quarter Final	Farouk	1 – 0	El-Olympi
	Sakr ?'

Semi Final	Farouk	1 – 0	Ittihad
	Othman ?'

29 April 1949 Final	Al-Ahly	3 – 1 (a.e.t.)	Farouk
			Marei ?'

== Cairo Zone League ==
Cairo league champion was decided by results of Cairo teams in national league with no separate matches for Cairo league competition.

=== Table ===
Pos	Team	Pld	W	D	L	GF	GA	GD	Pts
1	Zamalek (C)	6	4	1	1	14	5	+9	9
2	Al Ahly	6	2	3	1	16	8	+8	7
3	Tersana	6	2	2	2	7	8	−1	6
4	Al-Sekka Al-Hadid	6	1	0	5	3	19	−16	2

Source: angelfire.com
(C) Champions

=== Matches ===
10 December 1948 League week 8	Al-Ahly	2 – 2	Farouk
	Mekawi ?'; Osman ?'		Rostum ?'; Sakr ?'

7 January 1949 League week 10	Sekka	0 – 2	Farouk

14 January 1949 League week 11	Farouk	3 – 0	Tersana
	Sakr 15', 49'; Nasr 58'

1 April 1949 League week 19	Farouk	1 – 0	Al-Ahly
	Marei ?'

17 April 1949 League week 21	Farouk	5 – 0	Sekka

3 June 1949 League week 22	Tersana	3 – 1	Farouk
			Mannas ?'
