= Helmy Zamora Stadium =

Football stadium in Mit Okba, Giza, Egypt

Coordinates: 30°3′31″N 31°12′12″E

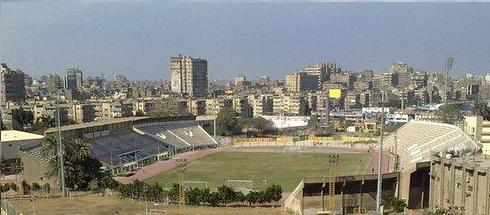
- Interactive map of Helmy Zamora Stadium
- Full name: Mohammed Hassan Helmy Zamora Stadium
- Former names: Abdel-Latif Abu-Rajelha Stadium
- Location: Giza, Egypt
- Owner: Zamalek SC
- Operator: Zamalek SC administrative board
- Capacity: 20,000
- Surface: Grass

Construction
- Opened: 1959

Tenant
- Zamalek SC (Training Field)

Helmy Zamora Stadium, is a multi-use stadium in Giza, Egypt. The stadium was initially named in honor of Helmy Zamora, the former player and president of Zamalek.

It was then renamed in 2014 to Abdel-Latif Abu-Rajelha Stadium after the former president of Zamalek Abdel-Latif Abu-Rajelhaa After that, it was again renamed Helmy Zamora Stadium in 2023. It is currently used mostly for football matches and was the home of Zamalek before they moved to Cairo International Stadium because of the small capacity. The stadium held as high as 40,000 spectators before the capacity was reduced to 20,000 as controls were put in place.

== Stadium inauguration ==
The stadium was officially opened in 1959, hosting a soccer match between Zamalek SC and Dukla Prague. Before the match kick-off, an aircraft dropped the ball into the field. The aircraft flew at a low altitude, which made some players lie flat. The inauguration match ended by Zamalek SC defeating Dukla Prague by a score of two goals to nil, scored by Abdou Noshi and Essam Baheeg.

== Stadium accident ==
In 1974 the stadium saw a deadly stampede at a friendly match between Zamalek SC and Dukla Prague, as at least 48 people were killed when the front fence of a stand was knocked down. The friendly match was subsequently cancelled.
