= Dominique Da Sylva =

Mauritanian footballer (born 1989)

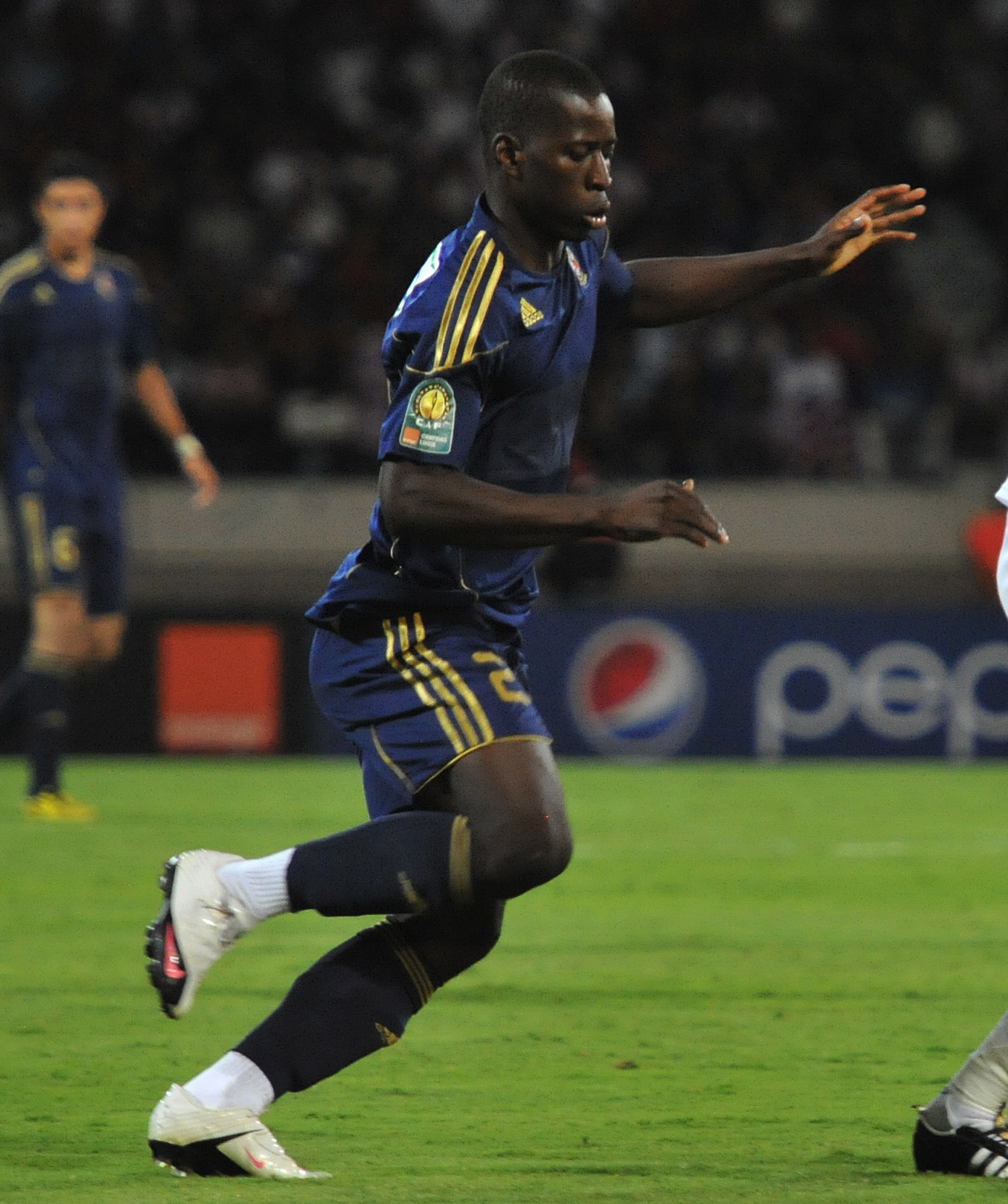
- Da Sylva with Al-Ahly in 2011

Personal information
- Full name: Dominique Da Sylva
- Date of birth: 16 August 1989 (age 37)
- Place of birth: Nouakchott, Mauritania
- Height: 1.77 m (5 ft 10 in)
- Position: Forward

Youth career
- 2006–2007: Académie de Football Nouakchott

Senior career*
Years	Team	Apps	(Gls)
2007–2011	CS Sfaxien	27	(11)
2011–2013	Al-Ahly	31	(5)
2013–2014	Zamalek	10	(3)
2014–2016	Al Urooba	27	(21)
2016–2017	Ermis Aradippou	21	(4)
2017	Hồ Chí Minh City	13	(5)
2018–2019	Sài Gòn	35	(12)
2020	Terengganu	4	(6)
2021	Kuala Lumpur City	6	(3)
2023–2024	ASC Jaraaf		
2024	Radwa		

International career
2007–	Mauritania	4	(4)
- * Club domestic league appearances and goals as of 13 April 2021 (UTC)

Dominique Da Sylva (born 16 August 1989) is a Mauritanian professional footballer who plays as a forward former the Mauritanian national team.

== Early life ==
Da Silva was born in Nouakchott, Mauritania to Guinea-Bissau parents. He is Catholic.

== Club career ==
He spent the 2006–07 season at the city's Académie de Football before joining Tunisian club CS Sfaxien in 2007. In his second season with Sfaxien, he scored four goals in ten appearances in Tunisia's top division, the Ligue Professionnelle 1. He scored three league goals in the 2009–10 campaign and two more the following season before joining Egyptian side Al-Ahly for $600,000 in January 2011. Da Silva scored three more goals during the 2010–11 campaign and helped Al-Ahly win the Egyptian Premier League for the seventh successive season. On 9 September 2012, he came on as a late substitute in Al-Ahly's 2–1 win over ENPPI in the Egyptian Super Cup. In January 2014, Da Silva moved to Zamalek SC. He made an immediate impression, scoring in each of his first four games.

In June 2017, he joined Vietnamese club Hồ Chí Minh City F.C., scoring two free-kicks on his debut. At the end of 2019, Da Sylva left Vietnam for Malaysia, signing with Terengganu F.C.

On 26 September 2023, Da Silva signed a contract with Senegalese football club ASC Jaraaf.

On 26 January 2024, Da Silva joined Saudi Third Division club Radwa.

== International career ==
He made his debut for the Mauritania national team in 2007 and scored 45 goals. He scored his first goal for his country against Morocco in 2008.

== Honours ==
CS Sfaxien

- Tunisian President Cup: 2009

Al-Ahly

- Egyptian Premier League: 2010–11
- Egyptian Super Cup: 2011
- CAF Champions League: 2012, 2013

Zamalek

- Egypt Cup: 2014
