= Islam Awad =

Egyptian footballer (born 1987)

Personal information
- Full name: Islam Awad Ismail el-Morsy
- Date of birth: 2 July 1987 (age 39)
- Place of birth: Cairo, Egypt
- Height: 1.81 m (5 ft 11 in)
- Position: Centre midfielder

Team information
- Current team: Al-Gaish

Senior career*
Years	Team	Apps	(Gls)
2004–2005	Mokawloon	?	(?)
2005–2006	Ahly Tripoli	?	(?)
2007–2012	ENPPI	56	(5)
2012–2014	Zamalek SC	8	(1)
2014–	Al-Gaish	0	(0)

International career^{‡}
2008–	Egypt	4	(0)
- * Club domestic league appearances and goals as of 19 November 2013 ‡ National team caps and goals as of 1 November 2013

Islam Awad (Arabic: إسلام عوض; born 2 July 1987) is an Egyptian footballer who plays for Zamalek SC as a midfielder as well as Egypt national football team.

== Honors ==
Zamalek SC

- Egypt Cup (2): 2013, 2014
