= Gehad Grisha =

Egyptian football referee (born 1976)

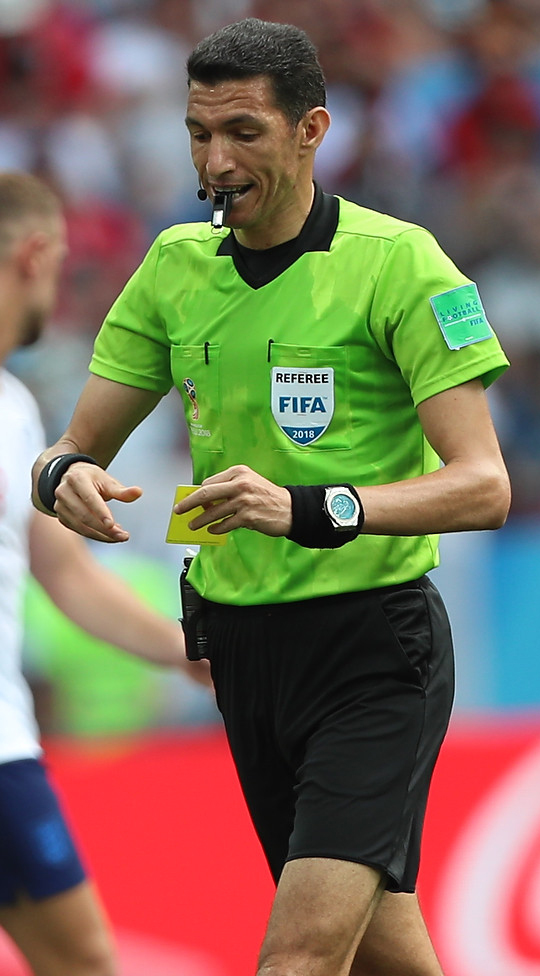
- Full name: Gehad Zaglol Grisha
- Born: 29 February 1976 (age 50); Mit Ghamr, Dakahlia, Egypt
- Other occupation: Employee

Domestic
Years	League	Role
2004–2021	Egyptian Second Division	Referee
2005–2021	Egyptian Premier League	Referee

International
Years	League	Role
2008–2021	FIFA listed	Referee
2013–2021	CAF Elite	Referee

Gehad Zaglol Grisha (Arabic: جهاد زغلول جريشة; born 29 February 1976) is an Egyptian former football referee who refereed in the Egyptian Premier League from 2005 to 2021 and was a FIFA-listed referee from 2008 to 2021. He refereed at five consecutive Africa Cup of Nations tournaments between 2012 and 2019, and also officiated at the 2018 FIFA World Cup.

== Refereeing career ==
Grisha started his officiating career in 2004 in the Egyptian Second Division before being promoted to the Egyptian Premier League in the next season. His first match in the top flight as a referee was on 28 November 2005 between Ismaily and Asyut Cement, which ended as a 4–0 win for Ismaily. Grisha showed only two yellow cards during that match.

He made his international debut on 4 June 2009, officiating a match between France U-21 and Qatar U-20 at the 2009 Toulon Tournament.

He made his CAF debut on 28 February 2010, appearing at the 2010 CAF Champions League preliminary round second leg match between Al Ahly Benghazi and Djoliba; a match that ended goalless. One year later, on 1 October 2011 at the 2011 CAF Champions League, Grisha officiated the semi-final first leg match between Wydad Casablanca and Enyimba, which ended 1–0 for the Moroccan side.

Grisha made his main international debut during the 2012 Africa Cup of Nations, officiating a group stage match between Ivory Coast and Burkina Faso as well as the third place match between Ghana and Mali.

He was also selected to officiate at the 2013 Africa Cup of Nations, appearing as a fourth official in four matches and as main referee in one match. Following the tournament, Grisha became a member of the CAF Elite and was selected to appear at every Africa Cup of Nations tournament since 2013 alongside other CAF competitions.

Grisha was selected to officiate the 2014 Egypt Cup Final on 19 July 2014 between Zamalek and Smouha at 30 June Stadium in Cairo. One red card and four yellow cards were shown during the match, which Zamalek won 1–0.

Grisha served as a referee at the 2018 FIFA World Cup and officiated a match between England and Panama. Grisha was the first Egyptian referee to appear at the World Cup since 2006.

On 14 August 2021, Grisha officiated his last Egyptian Premier League game, taking charge of a match involving Ismaily and league leaders Zamalek. One week later, Grisha took role of the video assistant referee at the 2020 Arab Club Champions Cup Final in Morocco (which was postponed for more than one year due to the COVID-19 pandemic) between Al Ittihad Jeddah of Saudi Arabia and Moroccan side Raja Casablanca. The following day, on 22 August 2021, Grisha announced his retirement although he was eligible for one more year.

== Matches ==
Any appearances made as a fourth official or in non-official competitions are not included.

=== FIFA World Cup ===
2018 FIFA World Cup – Russia
Date	Match	Venue	Round
24 June 2018	England v Panama	Nizhny Novgorod Stadium	Group stage

=== Africa Cup of Nations ===
2012 Africa Cup of Nations – Equatorial Guinea and Gabon
Date	Match	Venue	Round
26 January 2012	Ivory Coast v Burkina Faso	Estadio de Malabo	Group stage
11 February 2012	Ghana v Mali	Estadio de Malabo	Third place match
2013 Africa Cup of Nations – South Africa
Date	Match	Venue	Round
25 January 2013	Zambia v Nigeria	Mbombela Stadium	Group stage
2015 Africa Cup of Nations – Equatorial Guinea
Date	Match	Venue	Round
18 January 2015	Zambia v DR Congo	Estadio de Ebibeyin	Group stage
7 February 2015	DR Congo v Equatorial Guinea	Estadio de Malabo	Third place match
2017 Africa Cup of Nations – Gabon
Date	Match	Venue	Round
14 January 2017	Gabon v Guinea-Bissau	Stade de l'Amitié	Group stage
2019 Africa Cup of Nations – Egypt
Date	Match	Venue	Round
1 July 2019	Kenya v Senegal	30 June Stadium	Group stage
17 July 2019	Tunisia v Nigeria	Al Salam Stadium	Third place match

=== African Nations Championship ===
2014 African Nations Championship – South Africa
Date	Match	Venue	Round
11 January 2014	South Africa v Mozambique	Cape Town Stadium	Group stage
21 January 2014	Ethiopia v Ghana	Free State Stadium	Group stage
2018 African Nations Championship – Morocco
Date	Match	Venue	Round
16 January 2018	Cameroon v Congo	Stade Adrar	Group stage

== Personal life ==
Grisha works as an employee at a petroleum company in Cairo.
