= Mahmoud Genish =

Egyptian footballer (born 1987)

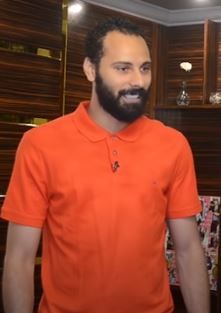
- Genish in 2020

Personal information
- Full name: Mahmoud Abdel Rahim Abdel Rahim
- Date of birth: 25 May 1987 (age 39)
- Place of birth: Alexandria, Egypt
- Height: 1.88 m (6 ft 2 in)
- Position: Goalkeeper

Team information
- Current team: Modern Sport FC
- Number: 16

Senior career*
Years	Team	Apps	(Gls)
2007–2011	Olympic Club		
2011–2022	Zamalek	73	(0)
2021–2022	→ Modern Sport FC (loan)	24	(0)
2022–	Modern Sport FC	42	(0)

International career
2018–	Egypt	3	(0)
- * Club domestic league appearances and goals

Mahmoud Abdel Rahim Ahmed Abdel Rahim (Arabic: مَحْمُود عَبْد الرَّحِيم أَحْمَد عَبْد الرَّحِيم; born 25 May 1987), known by his nickname Genish (Arabic: جنش), is an Egyptian professional footballer who plays as a goalkeeper for Egyptian Premier League club Future and the Egypt national team.

== Career ==
=== Zamalek ===
Genish joined Zamalek from Olimpi after Zamalek manager then Hossam Hassan recommended him for the club. He played multiple matches with Zamalek but he was mainly the second goalkeeper after the legendary goalkeeper Abdelwahed El-Sayed. His real start with Zamalek was in 2014–15 Egypt Cup when Zamalek manager Jesualdo Ferreira decided that he will play all cup matches with the substitute goalkeepers Mohamed Abou Gabal and Genish, to give Ahmed El-Shenawy some rest. Genish played match in round 16 against Haras El Hodoud making a remarkable performance and helping his club winning 3–1. He played the next match against El Ittihad Alexandria in quarterfinal helping his club winning by saving 3 penalties. He played the next match in semifinal against Smouha. when He helped his club with passing to the final by saving 4 penalties in the penalty shootout. He played the final against Zamalek's main rival Al Ahly helping Zamalek winning the cup after 2–0 victory. Zamalek fans started calling this championship "Genish's Championship" due to his performance across the tournament

Genish also played against Orlando Pirates in CAF Confederation Cup helping Zamalek win 4–1.

On 11 February 2017, Genish helped Zamalek win the Egyptian Super Cup after defeating Al Ahly 3–1 in penalties When He saved two penalties.

== Honours ==
Zamalek

- Egyptian Premier League: 2014–15, 2020–21
- Egypt Cup: 2012–13, 2013–14, 2014–15, 2015–16, 2017–18, 2018–19, 2020–21
- Egyptian Super Cup: 2016, 2020
- CAF Confederation Cup: 2018–19
- CAF Super Cup: 2020
- Saudi-Egyptian Super Cup: 2018

Future

- EFA League Cup: 2022
