= Akwetey Mensah =

Ghanaian footballer (born 1983)

Personal information
- Date of birth: April 15, 1983 (age 43)
- Place of birth: Accra, Ghana
- Height: 1.75 m (5 ft 9 in)
- Position: Defensive midfielder

Youth career
- Dansoman and Fastico S.C

Senior career*
Years	Team	Apps	(Gls)
2004–2005	El-Masry	25	(3)
2005–2007	El-Ahly	10	(0)
2007–2009	El-Masry	49	(2)
2009–2011	Lierse	23	(1)
2012	Wadi Degla	26	(3)
2013–2014	Ittihad El-Shorta	0	(0)
2014–2016	Al-Quwa Al-Jawiya	43	(1)
2016–2017	Al-Minaa	24	(1)
2017–2018	Al-Shorta	0	(0)
Total		203	(11)
- * Club domestic league appearances and goals

Akwetey Mensah (born April 15, 1983) is a Ghanaian footballer who played as a defensive midfielder.

== Career ==
Mensah transferred to El-Ahly in the 2005–04 season from El-Masry for a speculated record fee for the Egyptian League back at the time. In his debut match, which happened to be in the opening match of the group phase of the African Champions League against Enyimba in Nigeria, Akwetey suffered a tear in his knee ligaments without being touched by any player, only six minutes into the game and this kept him out of action for the rest of the season. In the next season, he played some games and came in as a sub. He only started in two or three games and couldn't get the attention of the coach Manuel José as he didn't get back in form. He was linked with a possible transfer back to El-Masry as of January 2007 and with Al Ahli Dubai.

On 27 May 2009, it was announced that he had joined Belgian club Lierse.

== Honours ==
Al Ahly SC

- CAF Champions League: 2005, 2006
- CAF Super Cup: 2006, 2007
- Egyptian Premier League: 2005-06
- Egypt Cup: 2005–06, 2006–07
- Egyptian Super Cup: 2005, 2006
- FIFA Club World Cup Bronze medal: 2006

Lierse SK

- Belgian Second Division: 2009-10

Wadi Degla

- Egypt Cup runner-up: 2013

Al-Quwa Al-Jawiya

- Iraq FA Cup: 2015–16
