= Omar Gamal =

Egyptian footballer (born 1982)

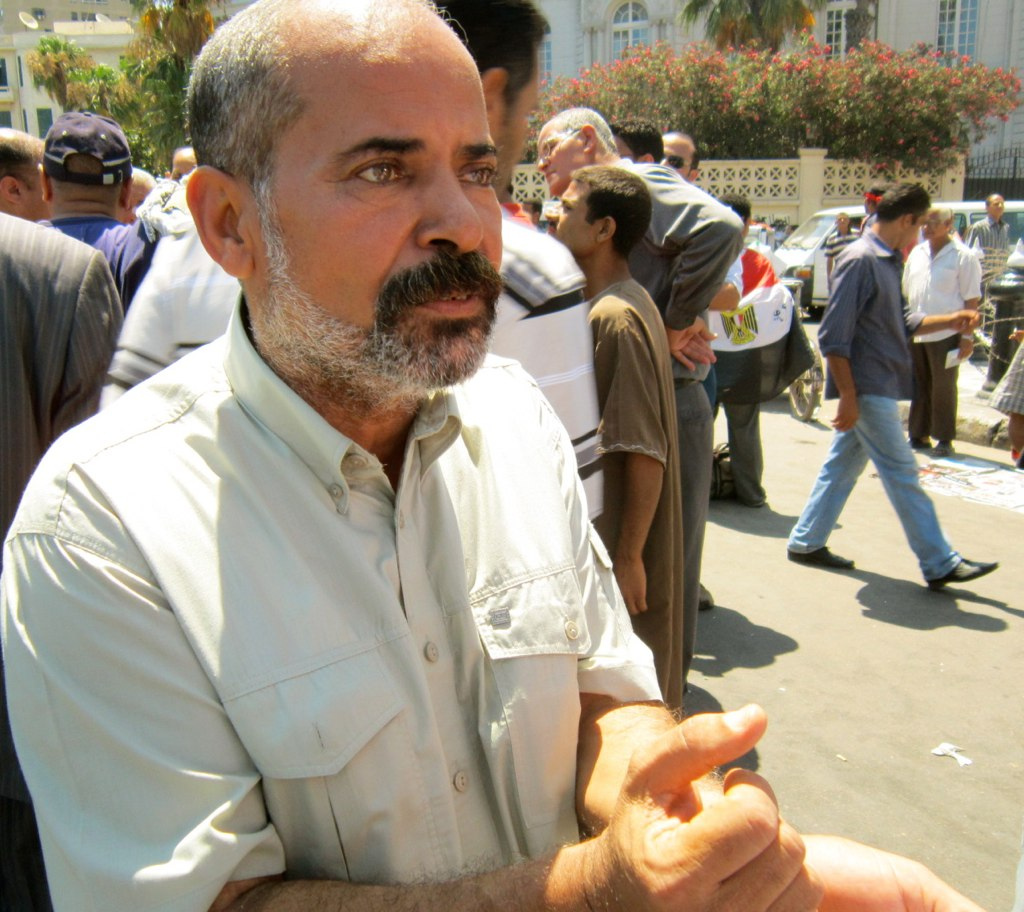

Personal information
- Full name: Omar Mohamed Gamal Kamel
- Date of birth: 16 September 1982 (age 44)
- Place of birth: Minya, Egypt
- Height: 1.69 m (5 ft 7 in)
- Position: Attacking midfielder

Senior career*
Years	Team	Apps	(Gls)
2002–2004	Al Aluminum		
2004–2013	Ismaily	109+	(20)
2013–2014	Al-Ahly Benghazi		
2014	Zamalek	2	(0)
2014–2017	Al Mokawloon	82	(6)
2017–2018	Ismaily	5	(0)
2018	Ceramica Cleopatra		
Total		198+	(26)

International career
2007–2008	Egypt	13	(0)
- * Club domestic league appearances and goals

Omar Mohamed Gamal Kamel (Arabic: عمر محمد جمال كامل; born 16 September 1982) is an Egyptian former professional footballer who played as an attacking midfielder.
