= Nour El Sayed =

Egyptian footballer (born 1984)

Personal information
- Full name: Nour El Sayed
- Date of birth: 9 January 1984 (age 42)
- Place of birth: Banha, El Qalyubia, Egypt
- Height: 1.73 m (5 ft 8 in)
- Position: Defensive midfielder

Team information
- Current team: El Gouna
- Number: 14

Youth career
- Banha

Senior career*
Years	Team	Apps	(Gls)
2005–2006	Banha		
2006–2012	El Gouna		
2012–2014	Zamalek	33	(1)
2014–2015	Difaâ El Jadidi	10	(0)
2015–2016	ENPPI	46	(2)
2016–2020	Al Ittihad	110	(3)
2020-	El Gouna	108	(7)

International career^{‡}
2016	Egypt	2	(0)
- * Club domestic league appearances and goals as of 14:55, 17 December 2025 (UTC) ‡ National team caps and goals as of 17:56, 27 February 2016 (UTC)

Nour El Sayed (Arabic: نور السيد; born 9 January 1984), is an Egyptian footballer who plays for Egyptian Premier League side El Gouna as a defensive midfielder. He's from Banha, Egypt.

== Honours ==
Zamalek

- Egypt Cup (2): 2013, 2014
