= Hassan Youssef (Egyptian footballer) =

Egyptian footballer

Personal information
- Full name: Hassan Youssef
- Date of birth: 7 September 1992 (age 34)
- Place of birth: Egypt
- Height: 1.73 m (5 ft 8 in)
- Position: Midfielder

Team information
- Current team: Aswan SC (on loan from Tala'ea El-Gaish)
- Number: 22

Youth career
- Zamalek

Senior career*
Years	Team	Apps	(Gls)
2010–2013	Zamalek	2	(0)
2013–	Tala'ea El-Gaish	82	(6)
2019–	→ Aswan SC (loan)	3	(0)
- * Club domestic league appearances and goals as of 19:48, 16 February 2020 (UTC)

Hassan Youssef (Arabic: حسن يوسف; born 27 January 1993) is an Egyptian footballer. He is best known as a former player for Tala'ea El Gaish SC, where he had many goals and assists over nine seasons. He later played for Aswan SC and Haras El Hodoud SC. He is a graduate of the Zamalek youth academy.

== Personal life ==
He was married in 2019.
