= Omar Gaber =

Egyptian footballer (born 1992)

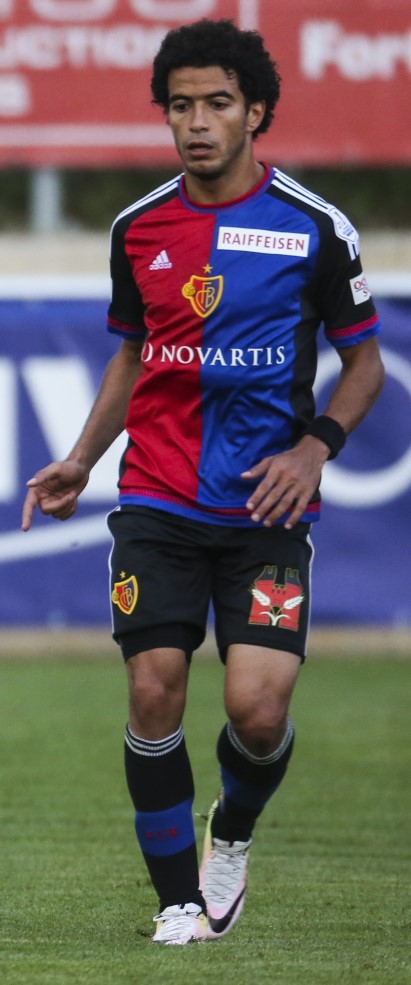
- Gaber with Basel in 2016

Personal information
- Full name: Omar Mahmoud El Sayed Gaber
- Date of birth: 30 January 1992 (age 34)
- Place of birth: Cairo, Egypt
- Height: 1.74 m (5 ft 9 in)
- Positions: Right-back; right midfielder

Team information
- Current team: Zamalek
- Number: 4

Youth career
- 1996–2010: Zamalek

Senior career*
Years	Team	Apps	(Gls)
2010–2016	Zamalek	114	(10)
2016–2018	Basel	13	(0)
2018	→ Los Angeles (loan)	7	(0)
2018–2022	Pyramids	103	(2)
2021	→ Tala'ea El Gaish (loan)	0	(0)
2022–	Zamalek	43	(1)

International career^{‡}
2011	Egypt U20	8	(1)
2011–2012	Egypt U23	8	(1)
2011–2022	Egypt	33	(1)
Medal record
Representing Egypt
Runner-up	2017 Gabon
- * Club domestic league appearances and goals as of 12 August 2024 ‡ National team caps and goals as of 27 September 2023

Omar Mahmoud El Sayed Gaber (Arabic: عمر محمود السيد جابر; born 30 January 1992) is an Egyptian footballer who plays for Egyptian Premier League side Zamalek, mainly as a right-back but sometimes as a right midfielder.

== Club career ==
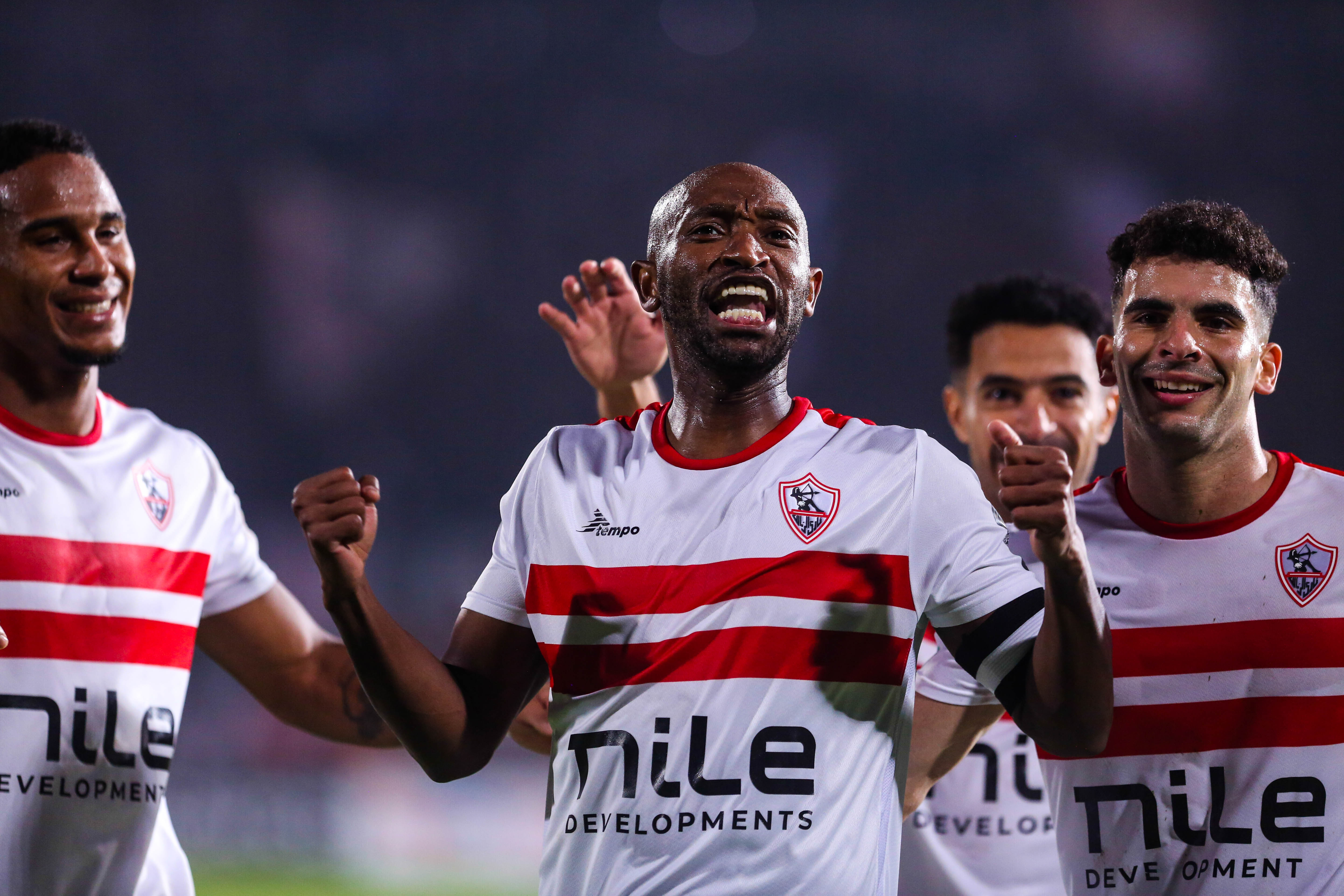
Zamalek players; from left to right: Seifeddine Jaziri, Shikabala, Gaber and Zizo in 2021.

=== Zamalek ===
Gaber played his youth football at Zamalek. In the 2009/10 season he advanced to their first team and soon played for them regularly. On 10 May 2016 it was announced that he would move to Switzerland. Egyptian media reports said Basel would pay Zamalek 1.65 million Euros to acquire Gaber's services.

=== Basel ===
In May 2016, FC Basel had reached an agreement with Zamalek to transfer Gaber during the summer transfer window. He was assigned the number 4 shirt. The 24-year-old Gaber became the fourth Egyptian player to join Basel in less than five years, after signing a four-year contract with the Swiss side. On 10 May Basel confirmed the four-year deal.

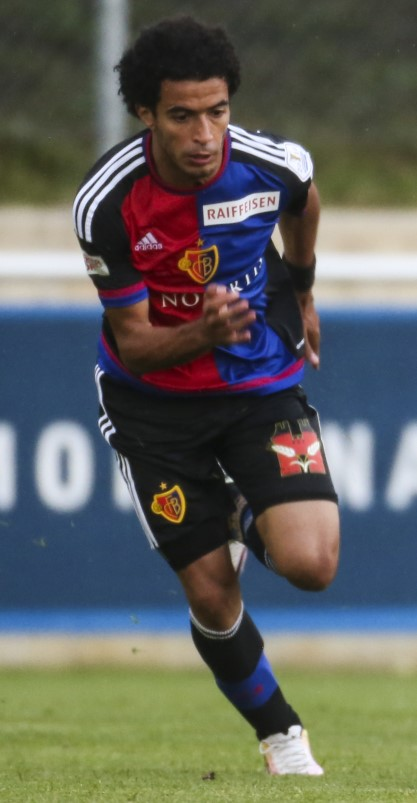
Gaber plays for Basel in 2016

On 1 July 2016 Gaber joined Basel's first team for their 2016–17 season under head coach Urs Fischer. After playing in six test games Gaber played in his domestic league debut for the club in the St. Jakob-Park on 24 July 2016 in a 3–0 home win against Sion. Under trainer Urs Fischer, Gaber and Basel won the Swiss Super League championship at the end of the 2016–17 Super League season. For the club this was the eighth title in a row and their 20th championship in total. They also won the Swiss Cup for the twelfth time, which meant they had won the double for the sixth time in the club's history. Gaber played in three cup games.

In the following season Gaber did not have much playing time and so the club looked for another solution. On 21 November 2017 Basel announced that Gaber would be loaned out to Los Angeles Football Club so that he could obtain match practice in the North American professional league. Gaber did not return to the club. During his short period with Basel, Gaber played a total of 30 games for Basel without scoring a goal. 13 of these games were in the Swiss Super League, six in the Swiss Cup, one in the Champions League and ten were friendly games.

=== Loan to Los Angeles FC ===
In January 2018, Gaber joined Los Angeles FC on loan from Basel, with Los Angeles having an option to take the player permanently. In his first 6 months Gaber played seven games in the Major League Soccer.

=== Pyramids FC ===
On 12 July 2018, Los Angeles picked up their option on making Omar Gaber's loan from FC Basel permanent. Basel confirmed the deal on the same day. However, Los Angeles immediately transferred him to Egyptian Premier League side Pyramids FC.

=== Return to Zamalek ===
In September 2022, Gaber returned to his original club Zamalek, signing a contract until 2025. He won the CAF Confederation Cup in 2024 with Zamalek.

== International career ==
Gaber made his debut for Egypt U20 on 17 April 2011 in the 2–0 victory against Lesotho U20. He represented Egypt at the 2011 FIFA U-20 World Cup in Colombia.

Gaber made his debut for Egypt U23 on 27 November of the same year in the 1–0 victory against Gabon U23. He made his debut for the Egyptian men's national football team in 2011. In 2012, he was part of the Egyptian team at the Summer Olympics.

In May 2018 he was named in Egypt's preliminary squad for the 2018 FIFA World Cup in Russia.

== Career statistics ==
=== International ===
Statistics accurate as of match played 27 September 2022.

Egypt
Year	Apps	Goals
2011	2	0
2012	0	0
2013	3	0
2014	1	0
2015	3	0
2016	6	0
2017	1	0
2018	3	0
2019	4	1
2020	0	0
2021	3	0
2022	7	0
Total	33	1

=== International goals ===
Scores and results list Egypt's goal tally first.

No.	Date	Venue	Opponent	Score	Result	Competition
1.	15 June 2019	Borg El Arab Stadium, Alexandria, Egypt	Guinea	3–1	3–1	Friendly

== Honours ==
Zamalek

- Egyptian Premier League: 2014–15, 2025–26
- Egypt Cup: 2012–13, 2013–14, 2014–15, 2024–25
- CAF Confederation Cup: 2023–24
- CAF Super Cup: 2024

Basel

- Swiss Super League: 2016–17
- Swiss Cup: 2016–17
