= Hany Said (footballer, born 1983) =

Egyptian footballer

Hani Saied
Personal information
- Full name: Hani Saied Saad Ahmed (Arabic:هاني سعيد سعد أحمد)
- Date of birth: 3 June 1983 (age 43)
- Place of birth: Giza, Egypt
- Height: 1.80 m (5 ft 11 in)
- Position: Defender

Team information
- Current team: Gomhoreyat Shepin

Senior career*
Years	Team	Apps	(Gls)
2000–2003	Dina Farms		
2003–2010	Haras El Hodoud SC	24	(0)
2010–2011	El-Masry	18	(0)
2011–2014	Zamalek	0	(0)
2013	→ Dhofar S.C. (loan)	0	(0)
2014–2016	Al-Ittihad Alexandria	57	(1)
2016–2017	El Dakhleya	0	(0)
2017–	Gomhoreyat Shepin	0	(0)
- * Club domestic league appearances and goals

Hani Saied (Arabic: هاني سعيد; born 3 June 1983) is an Egyptian footballer. He currently plays as a defender for Gomhoreyat Shepin.

== Career ==
Saied joined Zamalek from El-Masry in August 2011.

== Honours ==
Haras El-Hodood

- Egypt Cup (2): 2009, 2010
- Egyptian Super Cup (1): 2009

Zamalek SC

- Egypt Cup (1): 2014
