= Ahmed Kattawi =

Egyptian footballer (born 1991)

Personal information
- Full name: Ahmed Kattawi
- Date of birth: 8 April 1991 (age 35)
- Place of birth: Egypt
- Height: 1.72 m (5 ft 8 in)
- Position: Midfielder

Team information
- Current team: Tala'ea El-Gaish

Youth career
- Zamalek SC

Senior career*
Years	Team	Apps	(Gls)
2011–2013	Zamalek SC	3	(?)
2013–	Tala'ea El-Gaish	?	(?)

International career
- Egypt
- * Club domestic league appearances and goals

Ahmed Kattawi (Arabic: أحمد قطاوي; born 8 April 1991) is an Egyptian former footballer who played as a midfielder. He is a product of Zamalek SC youth academy. Kattawi's debut was in the season (2010–2011), he moved to Tala'ea El-Gaish in 2013.
