= Said Mohamed Otta =

Egyptian footballer (born 1992)

Otta
Personal information
- Full name: Said Mohamed Otta
- Date of birth: 3 January 1992 (age 34)
- Place of birth: Egypt
- Height: 1.75 m (5 ft 9 in)
- Position: Midfielder

Senior career*
Years	Team	Apps	(Gls)
2007–2011	Kaskada		
2011–2014	Zamalek		
2014–2016	Al Masry		
2015	→ Al Ittihad (loan)		
- * Club domestic league appearances and goals

Said Mohamed Otta (Arabic: سعيد محمد قطة; born 3 January 1992) is an Egyptian professional footballer who plays as a midfielder. He joined Egyptian Premier League club Zamalek from Egyptian third division side Kaskada in summer 2011, having agreed a five-year contract. In April 2012 he played in Zamalek's CAF Champions League match against Africa Sports.
