= Ahmed Tawfik =

Egyptian footballer (born 1991)

Personal information
- Full name: Ahmed Tawfik Mohamed Hassan
- Date of birth: 1 October 1991 (age 35)
- Place of birth: Kafr Saqr, El Sharkia, Egypt
- Height: 1.75 m (5 ft 9 in)
- Position: Defensive midfielder

Team information
- Current team: Pyramids
- Number: 12

Youth career
- El Mansoura

Senior career*
Years	Team	Apps	(Gls)
2008–2010	El Mansoura		
2010–2018	Zamalek	106	(3)
2018–2022	Pyramids	72	(1)
2018–2019	→ Al Ittihad (loan)	12	(1)
2023-	Pyramids	62	(0)

International career^{‡}
2010	Egypt U-20	6	(0)
2015–2021	Egypt	3	(0)
- * Club domestic league appearances and goals as of 09:20, 14 March 2026 (UTC) ‡ National team caps and goals as of 09:20, 14 March 2026 (UTC)

Ahmed Tawfik Mohamed Hassan (Arabic: أَحْمَد تَوْفِيق مُحَمَّد حَسَن; born 1 October 1991), is an Egyptian footballer who plays for Egyptian Premier League side Pyramids, as a defensive midfielder.

== Club career ==
=== Early career ===
Ahmed Tawfik started his career at El Mansoura before moving to Zamalek in 2010.

In 2018, Ahmed Tawfik joined Pyramids FC.

== International career ==
Ahmed Tawfik played for Egypt at U-20 level in 2010.

== Personal life ==
His brothers Abdelaziz and Akram are also professional footballers.

== Honours and achievements ==
=== Club ===
Zamalek SC

- Egyptian Premier League: 2014–15
- Egypt Cup: 2013, 2014, 2015, 2016, 2018
- Egyptian Super Cup: 2016

Pyramids

- Egypt Cup: 2023–24
- CAF Champions League: 2024–25
- CAF Super Cup: 2025
- FIFA African–Asian–Pacific Cup: 2025
