= Ahmed Ali (footballer, born 1986) =

Egyptian association football player

Personal information
- Full name: Ahmed Ali Kamel Mohamed Gharib
- Date of birth: 29 May 1986 (age 40)
- Height: 1.76 m (5 ft 9 in)
- Position: Striker

Team information
- Current team: National Bank of Egypt

Youth career
- Ghazl Shebin
- ENPPI

Senior career*
Years	Team	Apps	(Gls)
2006–2008	ENPPI	0	(0)
2008–2009	Asyut Petroleum	12	(0)
2009–2013	Ismaily	66	(19)
2011-2011	→ Al Hilal (loan)	11	(2)
2013–2015	Zamalek	43	(11)
2015–2016	Wadi Degla	4	(0)
2016–2019	Al Mokawloon Al Arab	80	(27)
2019–2020	Pyramids	1	(0)
2020-2020	→ ENPPI (loan)	21	(7)
2020–2021	National Bank of Egypt	26	(11)
2021–2021	Al Ittihad Alexandria Club	7	(0)
2021–2023	Al Mokawloon Al Arab	22	(1)
2023–	Haras El Hodoud SC	3	(0)

International career
2010–	Egypt	10	(5)
- * Club domestic league appearances and goals

Ahmed Ali Kamel Mohamed Gharib (Arabic: أحمد علي; born 29 May 1986), is an Egyptian footballer who played for Egyptian Premier League side National Bank of Egypt, and the Egyptian national team as a striker.

He currently plays for Haras El-Hodood FC.

He was recalled to the Egyptian national team in May 2019, following an 8-year absence.

== International career ==
=== International goals ===
Scores and results list Egypt's goal tally first.

No.	Date	Venue	Opponent	Score	Result	Competition
1.	10 August 2010	Cairo International Stadium, Cairo, Egypt	DR Congo	1–0	6–3	Friendly
2.	10 August 2010	Cairo International Stadium, Cairo, Egypt	DR Congo	2–1	6–3	Friendly
3.	5 January 2011	Osman Ahmed Osman Stadium, Cairo, Egypt	Tanzania	5–0	5–1	2011 Nile Basin Tournament
4.	11 January 2011	Ismailia Stadium, Ismailia, Egypt	Burundi	2–0	3–0	2011 Nile Basin Tournament
5.	16 June 2019	Borg El Arab Stadium, Alexandria, Egypt	Guinea	2–1	3–1	Friendly
