= Ahmed Gaafar =

Egyptian footballer (born 1985)

Personal information
- Full name: Ahmed Abdel Azim Fathy Gaafar
- Date of birth: December 21, 1985 (age 40)
- Place of birth: El-bagour, Monufia, Egypt
- Height: 1.91 m (6 ft 3 in)
- Position: Center forward

Youth career
- Sers Ellian

Senior career*
Years	Team	Apps	(Gls)
2006–2008	Menouf	??	(??)
2008–2009	Itesalat	30	(11)
2009–2014	Zamalek	133	(44)
2014–2015	ENPPI	21	(7)
2015–2016	Petrojet	28	(13)
2016–2017	Zamalek	8	(1)
2017	Misr Lel Makkasa		
2017–2018	Petrojet		
2018–2019	Tala'ea El Gaish	17	(2)
2019–2020	Al-Tersana		
2021	ZED		
2021–2022	Zamalek (UAE)		
2022–2023	Diamond		

International career^{‡}
	Egyptian Military Team	1	(5)
2013–	Egypt	6	(2)
- * Club domestic league appearances and goals as of 8 November 2008 ‡ National team caps and goals as of 19 November 2008

Ahmed Gaafar (Arabic: أحمد جعفر; born December 21, 1985) is an Egyptian footballer. He is known for playing with Zamalek.

== Career ==
In 2008–09 Egyptian Premier League season, Gaafar scored 11 goals for Itesalat making him the top goal scorer of his team. However, those goals were not enough to save Itesalat from relegation to the second division that season. As a result, he transferred to Zamalek before the beginning of the 2009/2010 season. In season 2009/2010 he scored 9 goals beginning his first season with zamalek. Even with the return of Amr Zaki from his loan move from Hull City A.F.C., and the arrival of 3 strikers: Ivorian Abou Kone, Iraqi Emad Mohammed, and Algerian Mohamed Amine Aoudia in the 2010/2011 season, Gaafar remained the first choice striker for Zamalek under the coaching of Hossam Hassan. In that season, Gaafar was among the league's top scorers finishing with 11 goals making him the second top scorer for Zamalek that season with 11 goals, where Shikabala had finished first in Zamalek with 13. On April 23, 2012, Gaafar revealed that Turkish Besiktas and Belgian Anderlecht and several other European clubs were interested in his services and looking to acquire him in the 2012 summer transfer window.

== Honors ==
Zamalek SC

- Egypt Cup (3): 2013, 2014, 2016
- Egyptian Super Cup: 2016

Individual

- Egypt Cup Top Goalscorer: 2013 (5 goals)
