= Mohamed Ibrahim (footballer, born 1992) =

Egyptian footballer (born 1992)

Personal information
- Full name: Mohamed Ibrahim Abou El Yazid El Shenawy
- Date of birth: 1 March 1992 (age 34)
- Place of birth: Abu El Matamir, Beheira, Egypt
- Height: 1.78 m (5 ft 10 in)
- Position: Attacking midfielder

Team information
- Current team: National Bank of Egypt
- Number: 10

Youth career
- Koroum Gianaclis
- –2009: Zamalek

Senior career*
| Years | Team | Apps | (Gls) |
| 2009–2014 | Zamalek | 52 | (10) |
| 2014–2015 | C.S. Marítimo | 7 | (0) |
| 2015–2019 | Zamalek | 60 | (5) |
| 2019–2020 | Misr Lel-Makkasa | 27 | (4) |
| 2020–2024 | Ceramica Cleopatra | 125 | (9) |
| 2024– | National Bank of Egypt | 0 | (0) |

International career
| 2011–2012 | Egypt U-20 | 13 | (4) |
| 2012 | Egypt U-23 | 2 | (0) |
| 2011– | Egypt | 7 | (0) |
- * Club domestic league appearances and goals

Mohamed Ibrahim Abou El Yazid El Shenawy (Arabic: محمد إبراهيم أبو اليزيد الشناوي; born 1 March 1992) is an Egyptian footballer who plays as an attacking midfielder for National Bank of Egypt.

== Career ==
=== Zamalek ===
Ibrahim attended Zamalek's youth academy. He made his debut with the club's first team in a league game with the coach Hossam Hassan. Despite playing only 4 games in his debut season, Ibrahim was considered a key player at the start of 2011. He scored his first goal against Al-Masry, which was a last minute goal-winner. He finished the first season with Zamalek with 15 appearances, scoring 2 goals in the process. European clubs started to gain interest in Ibrahim including French giants Lyon and Paris Saint-Germain.

In 2019, Ibrahim joined Misr Lel-Makkasa. In November 2020, he joined Ceramica Cleopatra.

== International career ==
Mohamed was also member of Egypt U-20 team participating at 2011 FIFA U-20 World Cup. After an opening game against Brazil, the opponents coach - Ney Franco - told to the press: "The Egyptians performance was outstanding. They were very organised and some players, like Mohamed Ibrahim and Mohamed Salah, are awaiting a bright future".

Mohamed Ibrahim was also considering a "future star" by Polish media, described as "pearl". He scored 3 goals in the group match against Austria. It was a first hat-trick scored by an African player of tournament. Ibrahim also performed with the Egypt U-23 team in the 2012 Toulon Tournament and the 2012 Arab Nations Cup under coach Hany Ramzy.

== Honours ==
Zamalek

- Egypt Cup: 2013, 2014, 2015, 2016–17, 2017–18, 2018–19
- Egyptian Super Cup: 2016
- CAF Confederation Cup: 2018–19

Ceramica Cleopatra

- Egyptian League Cup: 2022–23, 2023–24
