= Mohamed Abdel Shafy =

Egyptian former footballer (born 1985)

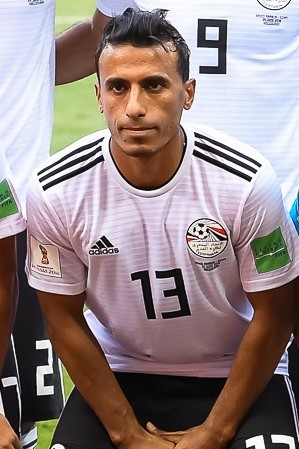
- Abdel Shafy with Egypt at the 2018 FIFA World Cup

Personal information
- Full name: Mohamed Abdel Shafy Said Abouzid
- Date of birth: 1 July 1985 (age 41)
- Place of birth: El Marg, Cairo, Egypt
- Height: 1.75 m (5 ft 9 in)
- Position: Left-back

Youth career
- 2000–2003: Zamalek

Senior career*
Years	Team	Apps	(Gls)
2003–2005	ENPPI	38	(7)
2006–2009	Ghazl El Mahalla	44	(0)
2009–2014	Zamalek	101	(8)
2014–2019	Al Ahli	74	(0)
2018	→ Al Fateh (loan)	9	(0)
2019–2025	Zamalek	53	(1)

International career^{‡}
2009–2018	Egypt	51	(1)
Medal record
Men's football
Representing Egypt
Africa Cup of Nations
Winner	2010 Angola
- * Club domestic league appearances and goals as of 9 August 2022 ‡ National team caps and goals as of 14 June 2022

Mohamed Abdel Shafy Said Abouzid (Arabic: محمد عبد الشافي سعيد أبوزيد; born 1 July 1985) is an Egyptian former professional footballer who played as a left-back.

== Club career ==
He started his career with Zamalek youth team, then moved to ENPPI and later to Ghazl El-Mehalla. He joined Zamalek's squad again in 2009.

== International career ==
Abdel Shafy was called to join the Egypt national team on 31 December 2009. In what was a surprise to some, the Egyptian team coach, Hassan Shehata, listed Abdel Shafy among the players heading to Angola for the 2010 Africa Cup of Nations. Abdel Shafy became a substitute for Sayed Moawad in this tournament, and played five matches. He grabbed his first goal for Egypt in the 4–0 semi-final win against Algeria.

In May 2018 he was named in Egypt's preliminary squad for the 2018 World Cup in Russia.

== Career statistics ==
As of 14 June 2022

Appearances and goals by national team and year
National team	Year	Apps	Goals
Egypt	2009	1	0
Egypt	2010	10	1
Egypt	2011	1	0
Egypt	2012	11	0
Egypt	2013	3	0
Egypt	2014	4	0
Egypt	2015	4	0
Egypt	2016	4	0
Egypt	2017	7	0
Egypt	2018	6	0
Total		51	1

No	Date	Venue	Opponent	Score	Result	Competition
1.	28 January 2010	Estádio Nacional de Ombaka, Benguela, Angola	Algeria	3–0	4–0	2010 Africa Cup of Nations

== Honours ==
Zamalek

- Egyptian Premier League: 2014–15, 2020–21, 2021–22
- Egypt Cup: 2012–13, 2013–14, 2018–19, 2020–21, 2024–25
- Egyptian Super Cup: 2019
- CAF Confederation Cup: 2023–24
- CAF Super Cup: 2020, 2024

Al Ahli

- Saudi Professional League: 2015–16
- King Cup: 2016
- Saudi Crown Prince Cup: 2014–15
- Saudi Super Cup: 2016

Egypt

- Africa Cup of Nations: 2010
