= Hazem Emam (footballer, born 1988) =

Egyptian footballer

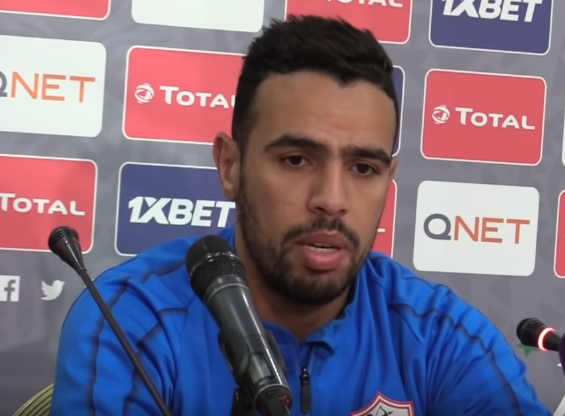
- Emam in 2019

Personal information
- Full name: Hazem Mohamed Abdel Hamid Emam
- Date of birth: 7 September 1988 (age 38)
- Place of birth: Imbaba, Giza, Egypt
- Height: 1.74 m (5 ft 9 in)
- Position: Right-back

Team information
- Current team: Zamalek (Assistant coach)

Youth career
- 1996–2008: Zamalek

Senior career*
Years	Team	Apps	(Gls)
2008–2022	Zamalek	203	(6)
2016–2017	→ Al Ittihad (loan)	20	(0)
Total		110	(6)

International career
2009–2016	Egypt	12	(1)

Managerial career
- 2025–: Zamalek (Assistant coach)
- * Club domestic league appearances and goals

Hazem Mohamed Abdel Hamid Emam (Arabic: حازم محمد عبد الحميد إمام; born 7 September 1988) is a football coach and a retired Egyptian professional footballer who played as a right-back for Egyptian Premier League club Zamalek. He currently works as assistant coach for Zamalek.

== Club career ==
Emam played his entire career in Zamalek. He debuted in the first team in 2008 with manager Hossam Hassan. Emam also scored the game-winning goal against Smouha in the 2014 Egypt Cup Final. In 2014–15 season he became the team captain.

== International career ==
Hazem Emam has represented the Egypt national football team, making his debut against Malawi on 29 December 2009. He was also on the team list for the Egyptian National Team in the 2014 FIFA World Cup qualification for Africa.

== Honours ==
Zamalek

- Egyptian Premier League: 2014–15, 2020–21, 2021–22
- Egypt Cup: 2013, 2014, 2015, 2016, 2018, 2019, 2021
- Egyptian Super Cup: 2020
- CAF Confederation Cup: 2018–19
- CAF Super Cup: 2020
- Saudi-Egyptian Super Cup: 2018
