= Salah Soliman =

Egyptian footballer (born 1990)

Personal information
- Full name: Salah Mohamed Soliman Ibrahim Elfass
- Date of birth: 20 January 1990 (age 36)
- Place of birth: Mit Ghamr, Dakahlia, Egypt
- Height: 1.88 m (6 ft 2 in)
- Positions: Centre-back; defensive midfielder

Youth career
- –2007: Ghazl El-Mehalla

Senior career*
Years	Team	Apps	(Gls)
2008–2011	Ghazl El-Mehalla	39	(4)
2011–2014	Zamalek	35	(0)
2014–2020	ENPPI	121	(9)
Total		195	(13)

International career
2009	Egypt U-20	5	(0)
2011–2012	Egypt U-23	3	(0)
2016	Egypt	1	(0)
- * Club domestic league appearances and goals

Salah Mohamed Soliman Ibrahim Elfass (Arabic: صلاح محمد سليمان إبراهيم الفاس) (born 20 January 1990 in Mit Ghamr, Dakahlia, Egypt) is an Egyptian retired professional footballer who played as a centre-back or defensive midfielder.

== Honours ==
Zamalek

- Egypt Cup: 2013, 2014
