= 30 June Stadium =

Stadium located in Cairo, Egypt

Coordinates: 30°01′12″N 31°22′25″E

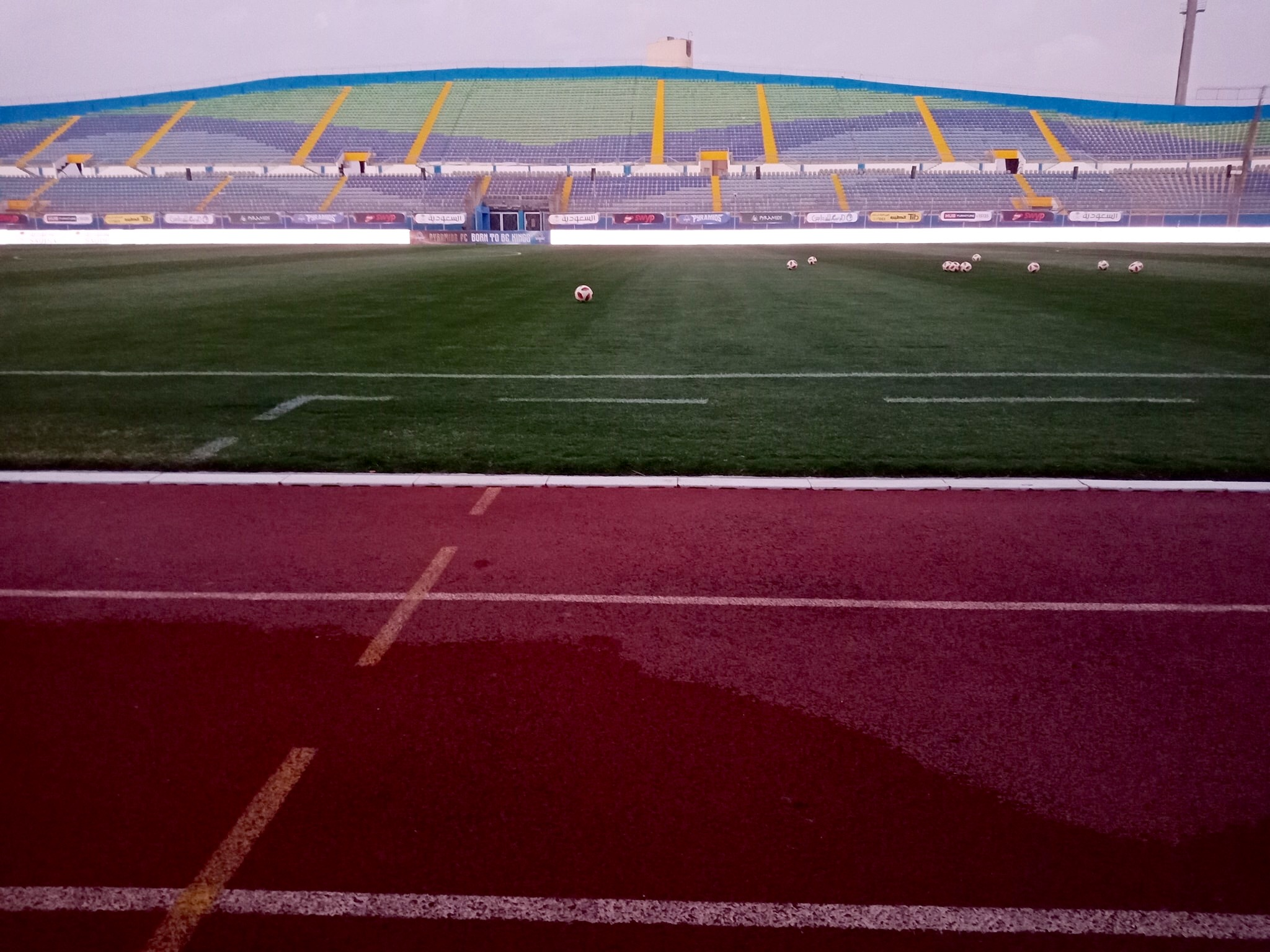
- Interactive map of 30 June Stadium
- Location: Cairo, Egypt
- Owner: Egyptian Air Defense Forces
- Capacity: 30,000
- Surface: Grass
- Field size: 104 metres (114 yd) by 68 metres (74 yd)
- Public transit: Marshal Tantawy Monorail station

Construction
- Opened: 2 July 2012

Tenant
- Pyramids FC

The 30 June Stadium known as Air Defense Stadium is a stadium used mostly for football matches and also sometimes for athletics located in Cairo. It was built by the Egyptian Air Defense Forces. The stadium is the main venue of the Air Defense Sport Village. The stadium has a capacity of 30,000 and it is one of the venues of the Egyptian Premier League. It is the home ground of the Egyptian Premier League side Pyramids F.C.

In March 2019 it was announced that the stadium will host all bar one of the fixtures of Group C in the 2019 Africa Cup of Nations, as well as one Group A and Group D match and one match each in the round of 16, the quarter-finals, and the semi-finals.

== Accidents ==
Twenty-eight football fans died on 8 February 2015 in a confrontation with the police at the gates of Egyptian stadium during a league match between two Cairo clubs, Zamalek SC and ENPPI. Most of the dead were crushed to death and suffocated when the crowd stampeded after police used tear gas to clear the fans trying to force their way into the stadium. Egypt's hardcore fans are notorious for violent behavior at matches, and Egypt has designated some as terrorist groups.

== 2019 Africa Cup of Nations ==
The stadium was one of the venues for the 2019 Africa Cup of Nations.

The following games were played at the stadium during the tournament:

Date	Time (CEST)	Team #1	Result	Team #2	Round	Attendance
23 June 2019	19:00	Senegal	2–0	Tanzania	Group C	7,249
23 June 2019	22:00	Algeria	2–0	Kenya	Group C	8,071
27 June 2019	19:00	Senegal	0–1	Algeria	Group C	25,765
27 June 2019	22:00	Kenya	3–2	Tanzania	Group C	7,233
30 June 2019	21:00	Zimbabwe	0–4	DR Congo	Group A	4,364
1 July 2019	18:00	Namibia	1–4	Ivory Coast	Group D	7,530
1 July 2019	21:00	Kenya	0–3	Senegal	Group C	13,224
7 July 2019	21:00	Algeria	3–0	Guinea	Round of 16	8,205
10 July 2019	18:00	Senegal	1–0	Benin	Quarter-finals	5,798
14 July 2019	18:00	Senegal	1–0 (a.e.t.)	Tunisia	Semi-finals	9,143
