= 2013–14 Egypt Cup =

2014 Egypt Cup
Tournament details
- Country: Egypt

Final positions
- Champions: Zamalek
- Runners-up: Smouha

Tournament statistics
- Matches played: 31
- Goals scored: 70 (2.26 per match)
- Top goal scorer: (Egypt) Ahmed Hamoudi (6 goals)

The 2014 Egypt Cup is the eighty-second season of the Egypt Cup since its establishment in 1921. A total of 48 teams are contesting for the Cup, The draw was held on 12 May 2014.

== preliminary round ==
15 May 2014	Tanta FC	2–2 (5–4 p)	Ghazl Kafr El-Dawar

15 May 2014	Baladeyet El-Mahalla	0–0 (10–9 p)	Qina FC

15 May 2014	Za'faran FC	1–1 (3–4 p)	Shabab El-Dab'a

18 May 2014	Sokar El-Hawamdia	1–0	Miah Al-Daqahlia

== Round of 32 ==
18 May 2014	Ismaily	2–0	El-Nasr
	Al-Sulaya 14'; Hassan 63'			Referee: Said Hamza

18 May 2014	Haras El-Hodood	2–2 (4–3 p)	Al-Masry	Aground Stadium
	Sabri 2'; Bahig 50'	[[[Category:All articles with unsourced statements]] Report]	Daouda 41'; Salah 88'	Referee: Amr Ayed

18 May 2014	El Minya	2–1	Bahteem
	Qaood 6', 78'	[[[Category:All articles with unsourced statements]] Report]	Medhat 36'	Referee: Hany Amin

19 May 2014	Al-Qanah	1–0	Suez Montakhab
	Tah 40'			Referee: Mohamed Qoutb

19 May 2014	Wadi Degla	3–1	Kahrbaa Ismailia
	Said 12', 40'; Al Agha 80'		Gharib 27'

19 May 2014	Ghazl El Mahalla	1–1 (3–2 p)	Tanta
	Arafat 17'		Hassan 15'

19 May 2014	Smouha	2–1	El Gouna
	Hamoudi 6', 35'		Ashraf 82'	Referee: Amin Omar

19 May 2014	Arab Contractors	4–0	Shabab El-Dab'a	Arab Contractors Stadium
	Fadl 16', 39', 66'; Farouk 52'

20 May 2014	Petrojet	0–0 (2–4 p)	Tala'ea El-Gaish
				Referee: Hesham Abd El-Hameed

20 May 2014	ENPPI	0–0 (6–5 p)	Al Ittihad Alexandria

20 May 2014	Misr El-Makasa	0–0 (1–4 p)	El Dakhleya

21 May 2014	El-Entag El-Harby	4–0	Dairoot

21 May 2014	Ittihad El-Shorta	3–2	Sokar El-Hawamdia

22 May 2014	El Raja	1–0	Baladeyet El-Mahalla

== Round of 16 ==
21 June 2014	Zamalek	2–1	Ghazl El Mahalla	Cairo Stadium, Cairo
17:00 UTC+3	Ali 33'; Dominique 45' (pen.)		Mahrous 82'	Attendance: 0 Referee: Mohamed Hanafi

21 June 2014	Haras El-Hodood	1–1 (4–3 p)	ENPPI
17:00 UTC+3	(?)		(?)	Referee: Medhat El-Houfy

21 June 2014	Arab Contractors	1–2	Wadi Degla
17:00 UTC+3	(?)		(?) (?)	Referee: Kamel Mohamed Kamel

21 June 2014	Al-Qanah	1–1 (4–5 p)	El Raja
17:00 UTC+3	(?)		(?)	Referee: Yasser Fawzi

22 June 2014	Ahly	4–3	El Minya
18:00 UTC+3	Hamdi 26'; Gamal 57', 90+2'; Bambo 63'		Ramdan 31'; Kaaoud 82', 90+1'	Referee: Tarek Samy

22 June 2014	Ismaily	3–0	El Dakhleya
				Referee: Mahmoud Ashour

22 June 2014	Ittihad El-Shorta	2–0	El-Entag El-Harby
				Referee: Bahaa Atef

22 June 2014	Smouha	2–1	Tala'ea El-Gaish
				Referee: Ahmed El-Ghandour

== Quarterfinals ==
9 July 2014	Ismaily	1–1 (2–4 p)	Wadi Degla
21:30	Abd El-Aziz 6'		Talaat 66' (pen.)

10 July 2014	Al Ahly	1–0	El Raja	Cairo Stadium, Cairo
21:30	Moteab 60'

10 July 2014	Haras El-Hodood	0–1	Zamalek	Alexandria Stadium, Alexandria
21:30			Fathi 86'	Referee: Sherif Rashwan

10 July 2014	Ittihad El-Shorta	2–2 (4–5 p)	Smouha
21:30

== Semifinals ==
14 July 2014 SemiFinals	Zamalek	0–0 (5–4 p)	Wadi Degla	30 June Stadium, Cairo
21:30 UTC+2				Attendance: 0 Referee: Sameer Mahmoud Othman
	Penalties
	Ali (penalty scored); Emam (penalty missed); Abdel Shafy (penalty scored); Ibrahim (penalty missed); Fathi (penalty scored); Zakaria (penalty scored); Soliman (penalty scored)		(penalty missed) Talaat; (penalty missed) El-Houssary; (penalty scored) Abdel Fattah; (penalty scored) El-Merghany; (penalty scored) Feisal; (penalty scored) Salem; (penalty missed) Mensah

15 July 2014	Al Ahly	1–2	Smouha	Cairo Stadium, Cairo
21:30	Moteab 81' (pen.)		Hamoudi 25', 34'

== Final ==
19 July 2014
21:30 UTC+2

Zamalek	1 – 0	Smouha
Emam 89'

30 June Stadium, Cairo
Attendance: 200
Referee: Gehad Grisha (Egypt)

== Top scorers ==
Rank	Player	Club	Goals
1	(Egypt) Ahmed Hamoudi	Smouha	6
2	(Egypt) Mahmoud Kaoud	Minya	4
3	(Egypt) Mohamed Fadl	Arab Contractors	3
3	(Egypt) Khaled Kamar	Ittihad El-Shorta	3
