= 2012–13 Egypt Cup =

2013 Egypt Cup
Tournament details
- Country: Egypt

Final positions
- Champions: Zamalek
- Runners-up: Wadi Degla

Tournament statistics
- Top goal scorer: (Egypt) Ahmed Gaafar (5)

The 2013 Egypt Cup is the eighty-first season of the Egypt Cup since its establishment in 1921. A total of 48 teams contested for the Cup.

== Quarterfinals ==
24 October 2013	Tala'ea El-Gaish	2–2 (a.e.t.) (4–3 p)	Aluminium Nag Hammâdi	Aswan Stadium
12:30 UTC+2	Hassan (?); Amin (?)		Mido (?)

24 October 2013	Wadi Degla	2–2 (a.e.t.) (5–4 p)	ENPPI	El Gouna Stadium
14:30 UTC+2

27 October 2013	Zamalek	3–0	El-Entag El-Harby	El Gouna Stadium
14:30 UTC+2	Gaafar 75'; Ali 82', 85'

28 October 2013	Ismaily	1–0	El-Nasr	El Gouna Stadium
14:30 UTC+2	Abd Rabo 26'

== Semifinals ==
3 November 2013	Zamalek	2–1	Tala'ea El-Gaish	El Gouna
14:30 UTC+2	Gaafar 2'; Emam 45+2'		Hefny 48'	Stadium: El Gouna Stadium; Attendance: 0 Referee: Mahmoud Al-Banna

3 November 2013	Ismaily	0–0 (a.e.t) (7–8 p)	Wadi Degla	Luxor
14:30 UTC+2				Stadium: Luxor Stadium; Referee: Tarek Magdy
	Penalties
	Metwalli (penalty scored); Al-Sulaya (penalty scored); Antwi (penalty scored); Abd El-Fadeel (penalty scored); Abd Rabo (penalty scored); Musa (penalty scored); Samy (penalty scored); Abd El-Aziz (penalty missed)		(penalty scored) Magdy; (penalty scored) Al-Agha; (penalty scored) Talaat; (penalty scored) Taha; (penalty scored) Faisal; (penalty scored) Salim; (penalty scored) Saeed; (penalty scored) Nabil

== Final ==
9 November 2013
14:30 UTC+2

Zamalek	3–0	Wadi Degla
Gaafar 13', 57'; Shikabala 65'	Report

El Gouna Stadium
Attendance: 4,000
Referee: Mohamed Farouk (Egypt)
