= 2015–16 Zamalek SC season =

Zamalek
2015–16 season
- Chairman: (Egypt) Mortada Mansour
- Manager: (Portugal) Jesualdo Ferreira (until 21 November 2015) (Brazil) Marcos Paquetá (until 3 January 2016) (Egypt) Ahmed Hossam (until 10 February 2016) (Egypt) Mohamed Salah (Caretaker, until 28 February 2016) (Scotland) Alex McLeish (until 2 May 2016) (Egypt) Mohammed Helmy (until 27 July 2016) (Egypt) Mo'men Soliman (Caretaker)
- Egyptian Premier League: 2nd
- Egypt Cup: Winners
- Egyptian Super Cup: Runner-up
- CAF Champions League: Runner-up
- Top goalscorer: League: Kahraba (3); All: Kahraba (4)
Home colours	Away colours

The 2015–16 season is Zamalek Sports Club 105th season of football since existence in 1911, 60th consecutive season in the Egyptian Premier League, the top flight in the Egyptian football. The club also play in the CAF Champions League, after winning the 2014–15 Egyptian Premier League.

== Team kit ==
The team kits for this season are manufactured by Macron.

Home	Away	Home (Cup)	Home (CAF)

== Players ==
=== Squad information ===
As of 13 August 2015.

Egyptian Football Association (EFA) rules are that a team may only have 3 foreign born players in the squad.
The Squad Has 25 Players Registered as Professionals and 5 Players Registered (-U23) and 2 Players of the Youth academy

No.	Nationality	Name	Age
Goalkeepers
1	(Egypt)	Ahmed El-Shenawy	24
16	(Egypt)	Mohamed Abou Gabal	26
21	(Egypt)	Gennesh	28
Defenders
4	(Egypt)	Omar Gaber	23
19	(Egypt)	Ahmed Duiedar	27
7	(Egypt)	Hazem Emam (captain)	28
22	(Egypt)	Hamada Tolba	34
25	(Egypt)	Ali Gabr	28
3	(Egypt)	Islam Gamal	26
	(Egypt)	Sherif Alaa	23
13	(Egypt)	Mohamed Adel Gomaa	22
Midfielders
5	(Egypt)	Ibrahim Salah	28
8	(Burkina Faso)	Mohamed Koffi	28
12	(Egypt)	Ahmed Tawfik	24
14	(Egypt)	Ayman Hefny	29
15	(Burkina Faso)	Maarouf Youssef	23
30 (24)	(Egypt)	Mostafa Fathi	21
18	(Egypt)	Tarek Hamed	26
6	(Egypt)	Ibrahim Abdel-Khaleq	29
18 (10)	(Egypt)	Ahmed Hamoudi	25
20	(Egypt)	Mohamed Ibrahim	23
11	(Egypt)	Kahraba	21
10	(Egypt)	Shikabala	29
Forwards
17	(Egypt)	Basem Morsi	24
31	(Egypt)	Mohamed Salem	24
9	(Egypt)	Ahmed Hassan Mekky	28
24	(Zambia)	Emmanuel Mayuka	25

=== Out on loan ===
Note: Flags indicate national team as defined under FIFA eligibility rules; some limited exceptions apply. Players may hold more than one non-FIFA nationality.

No.	Pos.	Nation	Player
27	MF	EGY	Ahmed Samir (at Ismaily until 30 June 2016)
28	DF	EGY	Mohamed Bazooka (at Ismaily until 30 June 2016)
9	FW	EGY	Khaled Kamar (at Smouha until 30 June 2016)
29	DF	EGY	Yasser Ibrahim (at Smouha until 30 June 2016)
33	FW	EGY	Youssef Obama (at Al Ittihad Alexandria until 30 June 2016)
10	FW	EGY	Shikabala (at Ismaily until 30 June 2016)
19	FW	BFA	Abdoulaye Cissé (at Ittihad El Shorta until 30 June 2016)

== Transfers ==
=== Players in ===
Date	Position	Name	From	Fee	Type	Source
27 July 2015	MF	(Egypt) Mohamed Gamal	(Egypt) Tersana	1,000,000 L.E.	Transfer	
28 July 2015	DF	(Egypt) Sherif Alaa	(Egypt) El-Mokawloon	6,000,000 L.E. + Mohamed Shaaban	Transfer	
28 July 2015	FW	(Egypt) Mohamed Salem	(Egypt) El-Mokawloon	6,000,000 L.E. + Mohamed Shaaban	Transfer	
28 July 2015	FW	(Egypt) Ahmed Hassan Mekky	(Egypt) Haras El-Hodood	3,500,000 L.E.	Transfer	
8 July 2015	DF	(Egypt) Mohamed Adel Gomaa	(Egypt) Al-Masry SC	3,000,000 L.E.	Transfer	
2 August 2015	MF	(Egypt) Kahraba	(Egypt) ENPPI	6,500,000 L.E.	Transfer	
5 August 2015	MF	(Egypt) Ibrahim Abdel-Khaleq	(Egypt) Smouha	5,000,000 L.E.	Transfer	
5 August 2015	MF	(Egypt) Ahmed Hamoudi	(Switzerland) FC Basel	€150,000	Loan	
20 August 2015	MF	(Egypt) Shikabala	(Portugal) Sporting CP		Transfer	
23 December 2015	MF	(Egypt) Ramzi Khaled	(Egypt) Ittihad Alexandria	2,500,000 L.E.	Transfer	
27 December 2015	FW	(Egypt) Shikabala	(Egypt) Ismaily SC	Free	End of Loan	
15 January 2016	FW	(Zambia) Emmanuel Mayuka	(France) FC Metz	?	Transfer	

Total expenditure: $3.9 million

=== Players out ===
Date	Position	Name	To	Fee
May 2015	DF	(Egypt) Mohamed Abdel-Shafy	(Saudi Arabia) Al-Ahli S.F.C	$2.75M
4 August 2015	MF	(Egypt) Mohamed Shaaban	(Egypt) El-Mokawloon	As a part of Mohamed Salem & Sherif Alaa Transfer
4 August 2015	DF	(Egypt) Reda El-Azab	(Egypt) Tala'ea El-Gaish	Free
4 August 2015	MF	(Egypt) Ahmed Samir	(Egypt) Ismaily	Loan
4 August 2015	FW	(Egypt) Khaled Kamar	(Egypt) Smouha	Loan
4 August 2015	FW	(Egypt) Youssef Obama	(Egypt) Al Ittihad Alexandria	Loan
13 August 2015	FW	(Egypt) Ahmed Ali	(Egypt) Wadi Degla	Free
20 August 2015	MF	(Egypt) Shikabala	(Egypt) Ismaily	Loan
September 2015	FW	(Burkina Faso) Abdoulaye Cissé	(Egypt) Ittihad El Shorta	Loan
January 2016	DF	(Egypt) Islam Gamal	(Egypt) Ismaily	Loan
January 2016	MF	(Egypt) Ibrahim Salah	(Egypt) Smouha	Loan
10 May 2016	DF	(Egypt) Omar Gaber	(Switzerland) FC Basel	

Total revenue:$2.7M

Net income: ▼$1.2M

== Statistics ==
=== Goal scorers ===
No.	Pos.	Nation	Name	Egyptian Premier League	Champions League	Egypt Cup	Super Cup	Total
11	MF	(Egypt)	Kahraba	3	0	0	1	4
9	FW	(Egypt)	Mekky	1	0	0	0	1
31	FW	(Egypt)	Salem	1	0	0	0	1
6	DF	(Egypt)	Duiedar	1	0	0	0	1
4	DF	(Egypt)	Gaber	0	0	0	1	1
TOTAL				6	0	0	2	8

== Competitions ==
=== Overall ===
Competition	Started round	Final position / round	First match	Last match
Egyptian Super Cup	Final	Runners–up	15 October 2015	
Egyptian Premier League	Matchday 1	Runners–up	21 October 2015	9 July 2016
Egypt Cup	Round of 32	Winners	31 March 2016	8 August 2016
CAF Champions League	First round	Runners–up	13 March 2016	23 October 2016

Updated to match played 21 September 2015
Source: Competitions

=== Overview ===
Competition	Record							
Competition	G	W	D	L	GF	GA	GD	Win %
Premier League	34	20	9	5	49	25	+24	58.82
Egypt Cup	5	5	0	0	13	3	+10	100.00
Champions League	12	7	1	4	16	12	+4	58.33
Egyptian Super Cup	1	0	0	1	2	3	−1	0.00
Total	52	32	10	10	80	43	+37	61.54

Updated to match played 25 September 2016
Source: Competitions

=== Egyptian Super Cup ===
15 October 2015	Zamalek	2 – 3	Al Ahly	Hazza Bin Zayed Stadium, Al Ain, United Arab Emirates
20:00 (UTC+4)	Gaber 26'; Kahraba 90'		Said 45+4' (pen.), 52' (pen.); Moamen 69'	Attendance: 25,000; Referee: Carlos Carballo (Spain)

=== Egyptian Premier League ===
==== League table ====
Pos	Team	Pld	W	D	L	GF	GA	GD	Pts	Qualification or relegation
1	Al Ahly (C)	34	23	7	4	65	24	+41	76	Qualification for the Champions League
2	Zamalek	34	20	9	5	49	25	+24	69	Qualification for the Champions League
3	Smouha	34	13	16	5	45	37	+8	55 (Note: Smouha ahead of Al Masry on head-to-head record; Smouha–Al Masry 1–0, Al Masry–Smouha 1–1.)	Qualification for the Confederation Cup (Note: Since the winners of the 2015–16 Egypt Cup, Zamalek, qualified for African competition based on league position, the spot awarded to the Cup winner (Confederation Cup) was passed to the fourth-placed team which were the next best teams in the table not already qualified for any African competition.)

Source: Soccerway
Rules for classification: 1) Points; 2) Head-to-Head points; 3) Head-to-Head goal difference; 4) Head-to-Head goal scored; 5) Head-to-Head away goal scored; 6) Goal difference; 7) Goal scored.
(C) Champions

==== Results summary ====
Overall								Home						Away					
Pld	W	D	L	GF	GA	GD	Pts	W	D	L	GF	GA	GD	W	D	L	GF	GA	GD
34	20	9	5	49	25	+24	69	12	4	1	28	9	+19	8	5	4	21	16	+5

==== Results by round ====
Round	1	2	3	4	5	6	7	8	9	10	11	12	13	14	15	16	17	18	19	20	21	22	23	24	25	26	27	28	29	30	31	32	33	34
Ground	H	A	H	A	A	A	H	A	H	H	A	H	A	H	A	A	A	H	H	A	H	H	A	A	H	H	A	H	A	H	A	H	A	H
Result	W	D	W	W	W	L	W	D	D	W	W	W	W	D	L	L	D	W	W	L	W	L	D	W	W	W	W	W	W	W	W	D	D	D
Position	4	6	3	2	5	7	4	4	5	4	3	1	1	2	2	2	2	2	2	2	2	2	2	2	2	2	2	2	2	2	2	2	2	2

Updated to match(es) played on 27 May 2016. Source: 2015–16 Egyptian Premier League
A = Away; H = Home; W = Win; D = Draw; L = Loss

==== Matches ====
21 October 2015 1	Zamalek	2 – 0	Wadi Degla	Petro Sport Stadium, Cairo
19:45 UTC+2	Kahraba 4'; Salem 81'			Referee: Mohamed Farouk

25 October 2015 2	Aswan	0 – 0	Zamalek	Aswan Stadium, Aswan
17:15 UTC+2				Referee: Ameen Omar

31 October 2015 3	Zamalek	2 – 1	El Entag El Harby	Petro Sport Stadium, Cairo
19:45 UTC+2	Kahraba 43', 50'		Fathalla 53' (pen.)	Referee: Mahmoud El-Banna

4 November 2015 4	Al Mokawloon	1 – 2	Zamalek	Petro Sport Stadium, Cairo
18:00 UTC+2	El-Ghannam 52'		Mekky 74'; Duiedar 88' (pen.)	Referee: Ibrahim Nour Ed-Deen

16 December 2015 8	Haras El Hodoud	0 – 2	Zamalek	Harras El Hodoud Stadium, Alexandria
15:00 UTC+2			Gaber 56'; Fathi 85'	Referee: Samier Othman

20 December 2015 9	Tala'ea El Gaish	3 – 2	Zamalek	30 June Stadium, Cairo
19:45 UTC+2	? ?' (pen.) ? ?'; Konan ?' (pen.)		Kahraba ?'; Fathi ?'	Referee: Mahmoud El-Banna

23 December 2015 10	Zamalek	5 – 0	Ghazl El Mahalla	Petro Sport Stadium, Cairo
19:45 UTC+2	Kalosha 32' (o.g.); Mekky 35', 43'; Kahraba 55'; Koffi 83'			Referee: Mohamed Ma'rouf

28 December 2015 11	Petrojet	1 – 1	Zamalek	Suez Stadium, Suez
17:30 UTC+2	Gaafar 38'		Youssef 53'	Referee: Mohamed Farouk

2 January 2016 12	Zamalek	2 – 2	Misr Lel-Makkasa	Petro Sport Stadium, Cairo
19:45 UTC+2	Hefny 37'; Fathi 90+6'		M. Dunga 4'; Najdi 61'	Referee: Gehad Grisha

6 January 2016 5	Zamalek	2 – 0	El Dakhleya	Petro Sport Stadium, Cairo
18:00 UTC+2	Hefny 14'; Salem 89'			Referee: Ibrahim Nour El-Din

13 January 2016 13	ENPPI	0 – 1	Zamalek	Petro Sport Stadium, Cairo
19:45 UTC+2			Shikabala 74'	Referee: Mohamed Farouk

17 January 2016 14	Zamalek	1 – 0	Ittihad El Shorta	Petro Sport Stadium, Cairo
18:00 UTC+2	Kahraba 15'			Referee: Walied Abdel-Razeq

21 January 2016 15	Al Masry	0 – 1	Zamalek	Ismailia Stadium, Ismailia
19:45 UTC+2			Fathi 84'	Referee: Mohamed El-Hanafy

31 January 2016 16	Zamalek	1 – 1	Smouha	Petro Sport Stadium, Cairo
17:00 UTC+2	Tolba 90+1'		El-Monoufy 33'	Referee: Mohamed El-Sabahy

4 February 2016 6	Ismaily	1 – 0	Zamalek	Ismailia Stadium, Ismailia
18:00 UTC+2	Gamal 45+1'			Referee: Samier Othman

9 February 2016 17	Al Ahly	2 – 0	Zamalek	Borg El Arab Stadium, Cairo
19:00 UTC+2				Referee: Viktor Kassai (Hungary)

14 February 2016 18	Wadi Degla	1 – 1	Zamalek	Petro Sport Stadium, Cairo
18:00 UTC+2				Referee: Said Hamza

19 February 2016 19	Zamalek	1 – 0	Aswan	Petro Sport Stadium, Cairo
17:15 UTC+2	Morsi

22 February 2016 7	Zamalek	2 – 1	Al Ittihad	Petro Sport Stadium, Cairo
20:00 UTC+2	Mayuka 8'; Kahraba 45'		El Adham 22'	Referee: Mohamed Farouk

3 March 2016 20	El Entag El Harby	3 – 1	Zamalek	Petro Sport Stadium, Cairo
19:00 UTC+2	Amin ?', ?'; Fathalla ?' (pen.)		Mayuka ?'	Referee: Sherief Rashwan

6 March 2016 21	Zamalek	2 – 0	Al Mokawloon	Petro Sport Stadium, Cairo
19:00 UTC+2	Koffi 43'; Mayuka 45+1'			Referee: Gehad Grisha

4 ِApril 2016 23	Zamalek	0 – 1	Ismaily	Petro Sport Stadium, Cairo
20:00 UTC+2				Referee: Ibrahim Nour Eldeen

14 ِApril 2016 22	El Dakhelya	0 – 0	Zamalek	Petro Sport Stadium, Cairo
19:00 UTC+2				Referee: Muhammed Maarof

26 April 2016 25	Zamalek	1 – 0	Haras El Hodoud	Petro Sport Stadium, Cairo
20:30 UTC+2	Morsy 7'			Referee: Awad Sa'faan

3 May 2016 26	Zamalek	2 – 1	Tala'ea El Gaish	Petro Sport Stadium, Cairo
20:30 UTC+2				Referee: Tarek Magdy

7 May 2016 27	Ghazl El Mahalla	0 – 2	Zamalek	Petro Sport Stadium, Cairo
17:45 UTC+2			Mayuka 9'; Hamoudi 65'	Referee: Mahmoud Bassiony

12 May 2016 28	Zamalek	2 – 0	Petrojet	Petro Sport Stadium, Cairo
18:00 UTC+2	M. Ibrahim 23', 85'			Referee: Mohamed Sabbahy

16 May 2016 24	El Ittihad	0 – 1	Zamalek	Alexandria Stadium
19:00 UTC+2			Abdel-Khaleq 11'	Referee: Samier Othman

22 May 2016 29	Misr Lel-Makkasa	1 – 3	Zamalek	Petro Sport Stadium, Cairo
20:30 UTC+2	Hamdy ?'		Kahraba 20', 74'; Bassem Morsy 50'	Referee: Mohamed Farouk

26 May 2016 30	Zamalek	1 – 0	Enppi	Petro Sport Stadium, Cairo
20:30 UTC+2	Kahraba 67'

12 June 2016 31	Ittihad El Shorta	2 – 3	Zamalek	Arab Contractors Stadium, Cairo
21:58 UTC+2	Saed Kamal 73'; Rico 82'		M. Ibrahim 36'; Basem Morsi 49'; Mostafa Fathi 62'

24 June 2016 32	Zamalek	2 – 2	Al Masry	, Alexandria
22:00 UTC+2				Referee: Mohamed Ma'rouf

33	Smouha	1 – 1	Zamalek	, Alexandria
UTC+2

34	Zamalek	0 – 0	Ahly	, Alexandria
UTC+2

==== Results overview ====
Win Draw Loss

Region	Team	Home score	Away score
Cairo	Enppi	1–0	1–0
Cairo	El Mokawloon	2–1	2–0
Cairo	Wadi Degla	2–0	1–1
Cairo	El-Entag El-Harby	2–1	1–3
Cairo	Ittihad El Shorta	1–0	3–2
Cairo	El Dakhelya	2–0	0–0
Cairo	Tala'ea El-Gaish	2–1	2-3
Cairo	Al Ahly	0–0	0–2
(Alexandria)	Smouha	1–1	1–1
(Alexandria)	El Ittihad	2–1	1–0
(Alexandria)	Haras El Hodoud	2–0	1–0
(Port Said)	Al Masry	2–2	1–0
(Aswan Governorate)	Aswan	1–0	0–0
	Ismaily	0–1	0–1
	Ghazl El Mahalla	5–0	2–0
(Suez)	Petrojet	2–0	1–1
(Faiyum Governorate)	Misr Lel-Makkasa	2–2	3–1

=== Egypt Cup ===
31 March 2016 Round of 32	Zamalek	2 – 0	Shabab El-Dab'a	Cairo
19:00 UTC+2	Gabr 33'; Hamoudi 72'	Report		Stadium: Petro Sport Stadium; Attendance: 50; Referee: Yasser Fawzy

12 July 2016 Round of 16	Zamalek	2 – 1	Ittihad El Shorta	Cairo
21:30	Abdel Khalek 15'; Fathy 90+6'		Mostafa 44' (pen.)	Stadium: Petro Sport Stadium; Referee: Ahmed Yacoub (Jordan)

21 July 2016 Round of 8	El Ittihad	1 – 2	Zamalek	Alexandria
20:30	Obama 35'		Shikabala 63'; Morsy 75'	Stadium: Borg El Arab Stadium

3 August 2016 Semi-final	Zamalek	4 – 0	Ismaily	Alexandria
20:30	Hefny 50'; Morsy 63', 70'; Mayuka 86' (pen.)	Report		Stadium: Borg El Arab Stadium; Referee: Mohamed Farouk

8 August 2016 Final	Zamalek	3 – 1	Al Ahly	Borg El Arab Stadium, Alexandria
20:30 UTC+2	Morsy 20', 25' (pen.); M. Fathi 59'	Report	Said 33' (pen.)	Referee: Andó-Szabó Sándor (Hungary)

=== CAF Champions League ===
==== First round ====
13 March 2016 First leg	Union Douala (Cameroon)	0 – 1	(Egypt) Zamalek	Stade de la Réunification, Douala, Cameroon
14:30 UTC+1		Report	Koffi 58'	Referee: Daniel Bennett (South Africa)

19 March 2016 Second leg	Zamalek (Egypt)	2 – 0 (3 – 0 agg.)	(Cameroon) Union Douala	Petro Sport Stadium, Cairo
20:00 UTC+2	Kahraba 26'; Tawfik 89'	Report		Referee: Bakary Gassama (Gambia)

==== Second round ====
9 April 2016 First leg	Zamalek (Egypt)	2 – 0	(Algeria) MO Béjaïa	Petro Sport Stadium, Cairo
20:00 UTC+2	Kahraba 58'; Hamoudi 81'	Report		Referee: Davies Omweno (Kenya)

19 April 2016 Second leg	MO Béjaïa (Algeria)	1 – 1 (1 – 3 agg.)	(Egypt) Zamalek	Stade de l'Unité Maghrébine, Béjaïa, Algeria
18:00 UTC+1	Yaya 56'	Report	Hamoudi 88'	Referee: Youssef Essrayri (Tunisia)

==== Group stage ====
Pos	Team	Pld	W	D	L	GF	GA	GD	Pts	Qualification	MSD	ZAM	ENY	ESS
1	(South Africa) Mamelodi Sundowns	4	3	0	1	6	5	+1	9	Knockout stage	—	1–0	2–1	—
2	(Egypt) Zamalek	4	2	0	2	3	3	0	6	Knockout stage	1–2	—	1–0	—
3	(Nigeria) Enyimba	4	1	0	3	4	5	−1	3		3–1	0–1	—	—
4	(Algeria) ES Sétif	0	0	0	0	0	0	0	0	Disqualified (Note: The CAF announced on 23 June 2016 that ES Sétif were disqualified for a pitch invasion and other incidents at their home match against Mamelodi Sundowns on 18 June 2016. The result of this match was annulled and not taken into consideration according to the regulations.)	~~0–2~~	—	—	—

Source: CAF
Notes:

19 June 2016	Enyimba (Nigeria)	0 – 1	(Egypt) Zamalek	Adokiye Amiesimaka Stadium, Port Harcourt, Nigeria
16:00 UTC+1		Report	Morsy 7'	Referee: Ali Lemghaifry (Mauritania)

29 June 2016	Zamalek (Egypt)	Cancelled	(Algeria) ES Sétif	Petro Sport Stadium, Cairo
22:00 UTC+2		Report		Referee: Sidi Alioum (Cameroon)

17 July 2016	Zamalek (Egypt)	1 – 2	(South Africa) Mamelodi Sundowns	Petro Sport Stadium, Cairo
21:00 UTC+2	Ibrahim 37'	Report	Mabunda 18'; Billiat 67'	Referee: Hamada Nampiandraza (Madagascar)

27 July 2016	Mamelodi Sundowns (South Africa)	1 – 0	(Egypt) Zamalek	Lucas Masterpieces Moripe Stadium, Pretoria
19:30 UTC+2	Gabr 80' (o.g.)	Report		Referee: Bakary Gassama (Gambia)

15 August 2016	Zamalek (Egypt)	1 – 0	(Nigeria) Enyimba	Petro Sport Stadium, Cairo
20:30 UTC+2	Morsy 63' (pen.)	Report		Referee: Denis Dembélé (Ivory Coast)

23–24 August 2016	ES Sétif (Algeria)	Cancelled	(Egypt) Zamalek	Stade 8 Mai 1945, Sétif
		Report

==== Knockout stage ====
16 September 2016	Zamalek (Egypt)	4 – 0	(Morocco) Wydad Casablanca	Borg El Arab Stadium, Alexandria
20:00 UTC+2	Shikabala 4'; Hefny 18'; Morsy 49'; Fathi 73' (pen.)	Report		Referee: Daniel Bennett (South Africa)

24 September 2016	Wydad Casablanca (Morocco)	5 – 2 (5–6 agg.)	(Egypt) Zamalek	Prince Moulay Abdellah Stadium, Rabat
21:00 UTC+1	Jebor 13', 45+1'; Haddad 19'; Ondama 56', 64' (pen.)	Report	Morsy 36'; Stanley 81'	Referee: Sidi Alioum (Cameroon)

==== Final ====
15 October 2016	Mamelodi Sundowns (South Africa)	3 – 0	(Egypt) Zamalek	Lucas Masterpieces Moripe Stadium, Pretoria
15:00 UTC+2	Laffor 31'; Langerman 40'; Gamal 46' (o.g.)	Report		Attendance: 35,000; Referee: Davies Omweno (Kenya)

23 October 2016	Zamalek (Egypt)	1 – 0 (1–3 agg.)	(South Africa) Mamelodi Sundowns	Borg El Arab Stadium, Alexandria
20:30 UTC+2	Ohawuchi 64'	Report		Attendance: 70,000; Referee: Bakary Gassama (Gambia)

=== Summary ===
Games played	49 (34 Egyptian Premier League, 10 CAF Champions League, 5 Egypt Cup)
Games won	32 (20 Egyptian Premier League, 7 CAF Champions League, 5 Egypt Cup)
Games drawn	10 (9 Egyptian Premier League, 1 CAF Champions League)
Games lost	8 (5 Egyptian Premier League, 3 CAF Champions League)
Goals scored	78 (49 Egyptian Premier League, 16 CAF Champions League, 13 Egypt Cup)
Goals conceded	37 (25 Egyptian Premier League, 9 CAF Champions League, 3 Egypt Cup)
Clean sheets	26 (17 Egyptian Premier League, 7 CAF Champions League, 2 Egypt Cup)
Yellow cards	?
Red cards	?
Top scorer	11 (Egypt) Kahraba
Winning Percentage	Overall: 23/35 65.71%)
