= 2014–15 Zamalek SC season =

Zamalek
2014–15 season
- Chairman: (Egypt) Mortada Mansour
- Manager: (Egypt) Hossam Hassan (until 2 October 2014) (Egypt) Mohamed Salah (Caretaker, until 12 October 2014) (Portugal) Jaime Pacheco (until 1 January 2015) (Egypt) Mohamed Salah (Caretaker, until 8 February 2015) (Portugal) Jesualdo Ferreira
- Egyptian Premier League: Winners
- Egypt Cup: Winners
- Egyptian Super Cup: Runner-up
- CAF Confederation Cup: Semi Final
- Top goalscorer: League: Bassem Morsy (18); All: Bassem Morsy (22)
Home colours	Away colours

The 2014–15 season is Zamalek Sports Club 104th season of football since founded in 1911, 59th consecutive season in the Egyptian Premier League. The club will also play in the CAF Confederation Cup, after finishing 3rd in the 2013–14 Egyptian Premier League and winning the 2014 Egypt Cup.

== Team kit ==
The team kits for this season are manufactured by Adidas.

Home	Home alt.	Away	Third	Goalkeeper 1	Goalkeeper 2	Goalkeeper 3

== Squad ==
As of 14 September 2014.

Egyptian Football Association (EFA) rules are that a team may only have 3 foreign born players in the squad.
The Squad Has 25 Players Registered as Professionals and 5 Players Registered (-U23) and 2 Players of the Youth academy

No.	Nationality	Name	Age
Goalkeepers
1	(Egypt)	Ahmed El-Shenawy	23
16	(Egypt)	Mohamed Abou Gabal	25
21	(Egypt)	Gennesh	27
Defenders
26	(Egypt)	Mohamed Abdel Razek	
4	(Egypt)	Omar Gaber	22
6	(Egypt)	Ahmed Duiedar	26
7	(Egypt)	Hazem Emam (captain)	27
13	(Egypt)	Mohamed Abdel-Shafy	29
22	(Egypt)	Hamada Tolba	33
24	(Egypt)	Saleh Mousa	28
25	(Egypt)	Ali Gabr	27
27	(Egypt)	Ahmed Samir	20
29	(Egypt)	Yasser Ibrahim	25
2	(Egypt)	Reda El-Azab	28
3	(Egypt)	Islam Gamal	25
Midfielders
5	(Egypt)	Ibrahim Salah	27
8	(Burkina Faso)	Mohamed Koffi	27
10	(Egypt)	Ahmed Eid Abdel Malek	34
11	(Egypt)	Moamen Zakaria	26
12	(Egypt)	Ahmed Tawfik	23
14	(Egypt)	Ayman Hefny	28
15	(Burkina Faso)	Maarouf Youssef	22
26	(Egypt)	Mahmoud Khaled 'Shika'	
30	(Egypt)	Mostafa Fathi	20
18	(Egypt)	Tarek Hamed	25
20	(Egypt)	Mohamed Shaaban	29
Forwards
9	(Egypt)	Khaled Kamar	26
17	(Egypt)	Basem Morsi	23
19	(Burkina Faso)	Abdoulaye Cissé	30
23	(Egypt)	Ahmed Ali Kamel	28
28	(Egypt)	Mahmoud Abd El-Majide	17–18
33	(Egypt)	Youssef Obama	19

=== Out on loan ===
Note: Flags indicate national team as defined under FIFA eligibility rules; some limited exceptions apply. Players may hold more than one non-FIFA nationality.

No.	Pos.	Nation	Player
13	DF	EGY	Mohamed Abdel-Shafy (at Ahli Jeddah until 30 June 2015)

== Transfers ==
=== In ===
Date	Position	Name	From	Fee
24 April 2014	MD	(Egypt) Ibrahim Salah	(Saudi Arabia) Al-Orobah	Free
15 June 2014	MD	(Burkina Faso) Maarouf Youssef	(Egypt) Ittihad El-Shorta	$349,528
15 June 2014	DF	(Egypt) Ahmed Duiedar	(Egypt) Ittihad El-Shorta	$349,528
15 June 2014	FW	(Egypt) Khaled Kamar	(Egypt) Ittihad El-Shorta	$349,528
15 June 2014	MF	(Egypt) Ahmed Samir	(Egypt) El Dakhleya	$167,818
15 June 2014	DF	(Egypt) Saleh Moussa	(Egypt) Ismaily	$279,622
18 June 2014	MD	(Burkina Faso) Mohamed Koffi	(Iraq) Duhok	$300,000
2 July 2014	FW	(Egypt) Basem Morsi	(Egypt) El-Entag El-Harby	$209,717
3 July 2014	DF	(Egypt) Reda El-Azab	(Egypt) Ittihad El-Shorta	Free
3 July 2014	FW	(Egypt) Ayman Hefny	(Egypt) Tala'ea El-Gaish	$279,622
9 July 2014	DF	(Egypt) Ali Hussien	(Egypt) Gasco FC	$7,000
12 July 2014	DF	(Egypt) Mohamed Abdel Razek	(Egypt) El-Sharqeya	$69,924
14 July 2014	DF	(Egypt) Ali Gabr	(Egypt) Al Ittihad Alexandria	$279,622
20 July 2014	GK	(Egypt) Ahmed El-Shenawy	(Egypt) Al-Masry	$838,867
20 July 2014	MF	(Egypt) Mohamed Shaaban	(Egypt) ENPPI Club	Free
17 August 2014	FW	(Ivory Coast) (Burkina Faso) Abdoulaye Cissé	(Libya) Al-Ittihad (Tripoli)	Free
24 August 2014	MF	(Egypt) Islam Gamal	(Egypt) Tala'ea El-Gaish	$700,000
8 September 2014	DF	(Egypt) Tarek Hamed	(Egypt) Smouha	$980,000

Total expenditure: $5 million

=== Out ===
Date	Position	Name	To	Fee
2 July 2014	MF	(Egypt) Said Mohamed Otta	(Egypt) Al-Masry SC	Released
13 July 2014	DF	(Egypt) Hany Said	(Egypt) Al Ittihad Alexandria	Released
20 July 2014	DF	(Egypt) Mahmoud Fathalla	(Egypt) Tala'ea El-Gaish	Released
22 July 2014	GK	(Egypt) Abdelwahed El-Sayed	(Egypt) Misr El-Makasa	Released
22 July 2014	FW	(Egypt) Ahmed Gaafar	(Egypt) ENPPI	Released
22 July 2014	FW	(Egypt) Ahmed Samir Farag	(Egypt) Ismaily	Released
22 July 2014	FW	(Egypt) Arafa El-Sayed	(Egypt) Tala'ea El-Gaish	Released
22 July 2014	FW	(Mauritania) Dominique Da Silva	(United Arab Emirates) Al Urooba	Released
15 August 2014	MF	(Egypt) Nour El-Sayed	(Morocco) Difaâ El Jadidi	Released
26 August 2014	MF	(Egypt) Islam Awad	(Egypt) Tala'ea El-Gaish	Released
31 August 2014	MF	(Egypt) Mohamed Ibrahim	(Portugal) C.S. Marítimo	$525,000
7 September 2014	DF	(Egypt) Salah Soliman	(Egypt) ENPPI	Released
11 October 2014	DF	(Egypt) Mohamed Abdel-Shafy	(Saudi Arabia) Al-Ahli S.F.C	Loan + $1.2M
31 December 2014	MF	(Egypt) Moamen Zakaria	(Egypt) ENPPI	End of Loan
13 January 2015	DF	(Egypt) Yasser Ibrahim	(Egypt) Smouha	Loan

Total revenue:$1.7M

Net income: ▼$3.3M

== Statistics ==
=== Goal scorers ===
No.	Pos.	Nation	Name	Egyptian Premier League	CAF Confederation Cup	Egypt Cup	Total
17	FW	(Egypt)	Morsi	18	2	2	22
10	MF	(Egypt)	Eid	7	3	0	10
9	FW	(Egypt)	Kamar	6	1	0	7
11	MF	(Egypt)	Zakaria^{[a]}	7	0	0	7
23	FW	(Egypt)	Ali	4	0	2	6
4	DF	(Egypt)	Gaber	4	2	0	6
14	MF	(Egypt)	Hefny	4	2	0	6
30	MF	(Egypt)	Fathi	3	1	2	6
12	MF	(Egypt)	Tawfik	2	1	0	3
7	DF	(Egypt)	Emam	2	1	0	3
8	DF	(Burkina Faso)	Koffi	2	0	0	2
19	FW	(Burkina Faso)	Cissé	1	1	0	2
25	DF	(Egypt)	Gabr	1	1	0	2
8	MF	(Egypt)	Salah	1	1	0	2
15	MF	(Nigeria)	Youssef	1	1	0	2
27	DF	(Egypt)	Samir	1	0	0	1
22	DF	(Egypt)	Tolba	1	0	0	1
18	MF	(Egypt)	Hamed	1	0	0	1
13	MF	(Egypt)	Abdel-Shafy^{[b]}	1	0	0	1
6	MF	(Egypt)	Abdel-Khaleq	0	0	1	1
#	Own goals			2	0	0	2
TOTAL				69	28	7	104

Last updated: 15 August 2015

Notes:
^{a} Loan from Enppi ended on 29 December 2014. ^{b} Left on loan to Al-Ahli SC (Jeddah).

=== Assists table ===
No.	Pos.	Nation	Name	Egyptian Premier League	CAF Confederation Cup	Egypt Cup	Total
14	MF	(Egypt)	Hefny	8	0	0	8
10	MF	(Egypt)	Eid	7	0	0	7
7	DF	(Egypt)	Emam	3	4	0	7
17	FW	(Egypt)	Morsi	1	2	2	5
4	DF	(Egypt)	Gaber	3	1	0	4
12	MF	(Egypt)	Tawfik	3	1	0	4
8	MF	(Egypt)	Salah	3	0	0	3
25	DF	(Egypt)	Gabr	2	1	0	3
9	FW	(Egypt)	Kamar	2	0	0	2
15	MF	(Nigeria)	Youssef	3	0	0	3
30	MF	(Egypt)	Fathi	2	0	0	2
22	DF	(Egypt)	Tolba	2	0	0	2
27	DF	(Egypt)	Samir	2	0	0	2
20	MF	(Egypt)	Shaaban	1	0	0	1
23	FW	(Egypt)	Ali	0	1	0	1
TOTAL				42	9	2	53

Last updated: 3 August 2015

== Pre-season and friendlies ==
15 August 2014	Zamalek (Egypt)	0–1	(Egypt) Misr Lil-Ta'meen

18 August 2014	Zamalek (Egypt)	3–0	(Egypt) Bahteam	Giza, Egypt
	Emam 20'; Ali 70'; Fathi 72'			Stadium: Helmi Zamora Stadium
Note: The game ended due to power outages before the end of the match.

25 August 2014	Zamalek (Egypt)	6–0	(Egypt) Al-Matahen
	Eid 26', 33', 40'; Abd El-Majide 65', 75'; Ali 85'

26 August 2014	Zamalek (Egypt)	2–0	(Egypt) 6 October	Helmi Zamora Stadium
	Eid 38'; Morsi 62'

28 August 2014	Zamalek (Egypt)	6–0	(Egypt) Sokar El-Hawamdeya	Helmi Zamora Stadium
	Eid 12', 54'; Ali 18'; Samir 29'; Koffi 48'; Cissé 86'

30 August 2014	Zamalek (Egypt)	4–0	(Egypt) Meiah Al-Beheira	Helmi Zamora Stadium
	Hefny 3', 79'; Eid 43'; Cissé 60'

1 September 2014	Zamalek (Egypt)	3–0	(Egypt) Nogoom El Mostakbal	Helmi Zamora Stadium
	Hefny 37'; Samir 47' (pen.); Duiedar 80'

4 September 2014	Zamalek (Egypt)	1–0	(Egypt) Al-Sekka Al-Hadid	Mit Okba Stadium
	Morsi (?)

6 September 2014	Zamalek (Egypt)	4–0	(Egypt) Telephonat Beni Suef SC	Mit Okba Stadium
	Ali 28'; Eid 50'; Cisse 66'; Youssef 89'

8 September 2014	Zamalek (Egypt)	2–0	(Egypt) Coca-Cola
	Ali (?); Cissé (?)

17 September 2014	Zamalek (Egypt)	5–0	(Egypt) ESCO
	Fathi (?); Eid (?); Ali (?); Cissé (?)

22 September 2014	Zamalek (Egypt)	3–0	(Egypt) Misr Lel Ta'meen

26 September 2014	Zamalek (Egypt)	8–0	(Egypt) El-Rai
	Eid 29' (pen.); Fathi 35'; Ali 45', 84'; Obama 50' (?); Abd El-Majide 62'; Morsi 70'

12 October 2014	Zamalek (Egypt)	2–1	(Algeria) JS Kabylie	30 June Stadium, Cairo
19:45 UTC+2	Morsi 63'; Eid 85' (pen.)		Hamroun 75'	Attendance: 100; Referee: Ibrahim Nour El-Deen
Note: Zamalek won Egypt-Algerian friendship friendly cup.

16 October 2014	Zamalek (Egypt)	6–0	(Egypt) El-Shams
	Obama (?); Eid (?); Emam (?); Tawfiq (?); Abdel-Majide (?)

14 November 2014	Zamalek (Egypt)	2–2	(Egypt) El-Gouna
	Yousef (?); Ali (?)		Afify (?); El-Sayed (?)

17 November 2014	Zamalek (Egypt)	4–0	(Egypt) Raas Gharb
	Ali 26'; Morsi 53'; Abdel Megeed 80'; Cisse 90'

14 January 2015	Al-Hilal (Saudi Arabia)	0–2	(Egypt) Zamalek	Riyadh
18:00 UTC+3			Eid 19' (pen.); Ali 48'	Stadium: Prince Faisal bin Fahd Stadium; Referee: Turky Al-Khedairy

24 January 2015	Zamalek (Egypt)	2–1	(Egypt) Sokar El-Hawamdia
	Kamar (?); Cissé (?)		(?)

19 February 2015	Zamalek (Egypt)	3–0	(Egypt) Zamalek (U-18)
	Cissé (?)

26 February 2015	Zamalek (Egypt)	2–0	(South Sudan) Al-Ghazal

26 March 2015	Zamalek (Egypt)	3–0	(Egypt) Shams

10 April 2015	Zamalek (Egypt)	3–0	(Egypt) Zamalek (U-18)
	(?)

== Competitions ==
=== Overall ===
Competition	Started round	Final position / round	First match	Last match
Egyptian Super Cup	Final	Runners–up	14 September 2014	
Egyptian Premier League	Matchday 1	Winners	21 September 2014	3 August 2015
Egypt Cup	Round of 32	Winners	11 January 2015	21 September 2015
CAF Confederation Cup	First round	Semi-finals	15 March 2015	3 October 2015

Updated to match played 21 September 2015
Source: Competitions

=== Egyptian Super Cup ===
14 September 2014	Al Ahly	0–0 (5–4 p)	Zamalek	Cairo International Stadium
20:00 UTC+3		Report		Attendance: 200; Referee: Mohamed Farouk
	Penalties
	Abd El-Zaher (penalty missed); Soliman (penalty missed); Nagieb (penalty scored); Ali (penalty scored); Samir (penalty scored); Raheel (penalty scored); Rizk (penalty scored)		(penalty scored) Abdel-Shafy; (penalty scored) Kamar; (penalty missed) Samir; (penalty scored) Gaber; (penalty missed) Koffi; (penalty scored) Tawfik; (penalty missed) Salah

=== Egyptian Premier League ===
==== League table ====
Pos	Team	Pld	W	D	L	GF	GA	GD	Pts	Qualification or relegation
1	Zamalek (C)	38	26	9	3	69	21	+48	87	Qualification for the Champions League
2	Al Ahly	38	23	10	5	65	26	+39	79	Qualification for the Champions League
3	ENPPI	38	18	16	4	65	29	+36	70	Qualification for the Confederation Cup (Note: Since the winners of the 2015 Egypt Cup, Zamalek, qualified for African competition based on league position, the spot awarded to the Cup winner (Confederation Cup) was passed to the fourth-placed team which were the next best teams in the table not already qualified for any African competition.)

Source: Soccerway
Rules for classification: 1) Points; 2) Goal difference; 3) Goals scored.
(C) Champion

==== Results summary ====
Overall								Home						Away					
Pld	W	D	L	GF	GA	GD	Pts	W	D	L	GF	GA	GD	W	D	L	GF	GA	GD
38	26	9	3	69	21	+48	87	16	4	0	47	8	+39	10	5	3	22	13	+9

==== Results by matchday ====
Round	1	2	3	4	5	6	7	8	9	10	11	12	13	14	15	16	17	18	19	20	21	22	23	24	25	26	27	28	29	30	31	32	33	34	35	36	37	38
Ground	H	A	H	A	H	A	H	A	H	A	H	A	H	A	A	H	A	H	A	H	A	A	H	A	H	A	H	H	A	H	A	H	A	H	H	A	H	H
Result	W	D	D	D	W	W	W	W	W	D	W	W	W	L	W	W	W	D	W	D	W	W	W	W	W	W	W	W	D	W	D	W	L	W	W	L	W	D
Position	7	8	10	9	7	3	2	1	1	2	2	2	1	2	1	1	1	1	1	1	1	1	1	1	1	1	1	1	1	1	1	1	1	1	1	1	1	1

Updated to match(es) played on 3 August 2015. Source: 2014–15 Egyptian Premier League
A = Away; H = Home; W = Win; D = Draw; L = Loss

==== Matches ====
21 September 2014 2	Zamalek	6–1	Tala'ea El-Gaish	30 June Stadium, Cairo
19:15 UTC+3	Kamar 11' (pen.); Zakaria 20', 48', 85'; Abdel-Shafy 70'; Cissé 73'	Report	Konan 80'	Attendance: 50; Referee: Mohamed El-Hanafy (Egypt)

25 September 2014 3	El-Shorta	0–0	Zamalek	Osman Ahmad Osman Stadium, Cairo
19:15 UTC+3		Report		Attendance: 50; Referee: Mahmoud El-Banna (Egypt)

1 October 2014 4	Zamalek	0–0	El Dakhleya	30 June Stadium, Cairo
19:30 UTC+2		Report		Attendance: 50; Referee: Gehad Grisha (Egypt)

20 October 2014 5	Wadi Degla	0–0	Zamalek	30 June Stadium, Cairo
19:30 UTC+2				Referee: Mahmoud El-Basiony (Egypt)

25 October 2014 6	Zamalek	2–0	Smouha	30 June Stadium, Cairo
19:30 UTC+2	Morsi 90+2'; Zakaria 90+5'			Referee: Mohamed El-Hanafy (Egypt)

30 October 2014 7	El-Ittihad	0–1	Zamalek	Alexandria Stadium, Alexandria
18:00 UTC+2			Zakaria 73'	Attendance: 125; Referee: Mohamed Farouk (Egypt)

5 November 2014 8	Zamalek	2–0	Haras El-Hodood	30 June Stadium, Cairo
20:00 UTC+2	Kamar 30'; Emam 77'			Attendance: 15; Referee: Mahmoud Ashour (Egypt)

23 November 2014 9	El-Raja	2–3	Zamalek	El Max Stadium, Alexandria
17:00 UTC+2	Salim 22'; Socrate 90'		Morsi 29', 70' (pen.); Ali 87'	Attendance: 100; Referee: Mohamed Adel (Egypt)

29 November 2014 10	Zamalek	1–0	Al-Masry	Ismailia Stadium, Ismaïlia
19:30 UTC+2	Morsi 31'			Referee: Ibrahim Nour El-Din (Egypt)

4 December 2014 11	Ismaily SC	0–0	Zamalek	Ismailia Stadium, Ismaïlia
17:00 UTC+2				Attendance: 50; Referee: Mohamed El-Hanafy (Egypt)

9 December 2014 12	Zamalek	3–1	Misr El-Makasa SC	30 June Stadium, Cairo
19:30 UTC+2	Samir 35' (pen.); Zakaria 70'; El-Sayed 90' (o.g.)		Abdel-Aziz 59'	Referee: Samir Othman (Egypt)

14 December 2014 13	Alassiouty Sport	1–3	Zamalek	Bani Sweif Stadium, Beni Suef
14:30 UTC+2	Nnake 67'		Ali 1'; Emam 9'; Eid 88'	Attendance: 50; Referee: Gehad Grisha (Egypt)

18 December 2014 14	Zamalek	2–0	El Gouna FC	30 June Stadium, Cairo
19:30 UTC+2	Morsi 53'; Eid 85' (pen.)			Attendance: 50; Referee: Mahmoud El-Banna (Egypt)

25 December 2014 1	ENPPI	2–0	Zamalek	Cairo International Stadium
19:00 UTC+2	Kaood 61'; Nassef 70' (pen.)	Report		Attendance: 50; Referee: Mahmoud Ashour (Egypt)

29 December 2014 15	Ala'ab Damanhour	1–2	Zamalek	Damanhour Stadium, Damanhour
14:30 UTC+2	Nasr 77'	Report	Zakaria 22'; Kamar 61'	Attendance: 100; Referee: Mahmoud Sabahy (Egypt)

3 January 2015 16	Zamalek	2–1	Petrojet FC	30 June Stadium, Cairo
19:30 UTC+2	Kamar 43'; Tawfik 60'	Report	Bekele 25'	Referee: Amin Omar (Egypt)

7 January 2015 17	Arab Contractors FC	0–1	Zamalek	Osman Ahmad Osman Stadium, Cairo
19:30 UTC+2		Report	Hefny 23'	Referee: Samir Othman (Egypt)

29 January 2015 18	Zamalek	1–1	Al Ahly	Cairo Stadium, Cairo
18:00 UTC+2	Hefny 32'	Report	Soliman 35'	Attendance: 150; Referee: Tony Chapron (France)

2 February 2015 19	Al Nasr	1–3	Zamalek	Petro Sport Stadium, Cairo
18:00 UTC+2	El Azab 25'	Report	Morsi 34'; Fathi 70' (pen.); Gaber 90+3'	Referee: Mohamed Maarouf (Egypt)

8 February 2015 20	Zamalek	1–1	ENPPI	30 June Stadium, Cairo
20:00 UTC+2	Morsi 37'	Report	Kahraba 25'	Attendance: 3,000; Referee: Mahmoud El-Banna (Egypt)
Note: The match resulted in 30 June Stadium Stampede

30 March 2015 23	El Dakhleya	0–2	Zamalek	Suez Stadium, Suez
16:30 UTC+2		Report	Tolba 60'; Eid 70' (pen.)	Referee: Mohamed El-Hanafy (Egypt)

14 April 2015 25	Smouha	0–1	Zamalek	Alexandria Stadium, Alexandria
15:00 UTC+2		Report	Hefny 82' (pen.)	Referee: Samir Othman (Egypt)

23 April 2015 26	Zamalek	2–0	El-Ittihad	Petro Sport Stadium, Cairo
18:00 UTC+2	Gaber 15'; Morsi 65'	Report		Referee: Ibrahim Noor El-Din (Egypt)

27 April 2015 27	Haras El-Hodood	0–2	Zamalek	Borg El Arab Stadium, Alexandria
15:45 UTC+2		Report	Gaber 65'; Ali 83'	Referee: Mahmoud El-Banna (Egypt)

7 May 2015 28	Zamalek	2–0	El-Raja	Petro Sport Stadium, Cairo
18:00 UTC+2	Morsi 16'; Fathi 75'	Report		Referee: Amin Omar (Egypt)

11 May 2015 29	Al-Masry	0–1	Zamalek	Ismailia Stadium, Ismaïlia
18:30 UTC+2		Report	Morsi 5'	Referee: Mohamed Al-Hanafy(Egypt)

24 May 2015 32	Zamalek	2–0	Alassiouty Sport	Petro Sport Stadium, Cairo
19:30 UTC+2	Morsi 2'; Ali 29'	Report		Referee: Mahmoud Ashour (Egypt)

28 May 2015 22	Zamalek	5–1	El-Shorta	Petro Sport Stadium, Cairo
20:00 UTC+2	Morsi 33' (pen.); Salah 40'; Kamar 49' 90+3'; Koffi 84'	Report	Gomaa 23'	Referee: Ibrahim Noor El-Din (Egypt)

1 June 2015 33	El Gouna	1–1	Zamalek	El Gouna Stadium, El Gouna
16:30 UTC+2	Said 3'	Report	Gabr 36'	Referee: Amin Omar (Egypt)

17 June 2015 34	Zamalek	3–0	Ala'ab Damanhour	Petro Sport Stadium, Cairo
20:00 UTC+2	Eid 27'; Hefny 55'; Hamed 82'	Report		Referee: Mohamed Maarouf (Egypt)

20 June 2015 35	Petrojet FC	1–1	Zamalek	Suez Stadium, Suez
21:30 UTC+2	Teddi 90+5	Report	Morsi 67'	Referee: Mahmoud El-Banna (Egypt)

23 June 2015 36	Zamalek	3–0	Arab Contractors FC	Petro Sport Stadium, Cairo
21:30 UTC+2	Koffi 32'; Eid 36', 58'	Report		Referee: Mohamed El-Hanafy (Egypt)

2 July 2015 31	Misr El-Makasa SC	2–1	Zamalek	Fayoum Stadium, Fayoum
21:30 UTC+2	El-Sheikh 58'; Said 71' (pen.)	Report	Gaber 28' (pen.)	Referee: Ibrahim Noor El-Din (Egypt)

6 July 2015 30	Zamalek	3–0	Ismaily SC	Petro Sport Stadium, Cairo
22:00 UTC+2	Morsi 7'; Tawfik 8'; Youssef 58'	Report		Referee: Samir Othman (Egypt)

15 July 2015 38	Zamalek	4–0	Al Nasr	Petro Sport Stadium, Cairo
22:00 UTC+2	Morsi 12', 20', 63'; Fathi 65'; Youssef (yellow card) 84'	Report		Referee: Mohamed Al-Sabahy

21 July 2015 37	Al Ahly	2–0	Zamalek	Borg El Arab Stadium, Alexandria
19:00 UTC+2	Zakaria 32', 80'			Referee: Milorad Mažić (Serbia)

29 July 2015 23	Tala'ea El-Gaish SC	2–3	Zamalek	Petro Sport Stadium, Cairo
19:30 UTC+2	Hashem 49'; Kamal 90'		Hashem 12' (o.g.); Eid 14'; Morsy 74'	Referee: Mohamed Farouk

3 August 2015 24	Zamalek	0–0	Wadi Degla	30 June Stadium, Cairo
19:30 UTC+2				Referee: Mohamed Farouk

=== Egypt Cup ===
11 January 2015 Round of 32	Zamalek	2–1	Nogoum Al-Mostaqbal	Cairo
17:30 UTC+2	Ali 60', 87'		Hammam 54'	Stadium: 30 June Stadium; Referee: Waleed Abdel-Razak (Egypt)

15 August 2015 Round of 16	Zamalek	3–1	Haras El-Hodood	Cairo
20:00 UTC+2	Fathi 71', 72'; Abdel-Khaleq 88'		Ramadan 78' (pen.)	Stadium: Petro Sport Stadium; Referee: Gehad Grisha (Egypt)

18 August 2015 Quarter final	El Ittihad	0–0 (2–4 p)	Zamalek	Alexandria
19:30 UTC+2				Stadium: Alexandria Stadium; Referee: Samir Othman
	Penalties
	Khaled (penalty missed); Farouk (penalty missed); Shehata (penalty scored); Adel (penalty scored)		(penalty scored) M. Ibrahim; (penalty scored) Kahraba; (penalty missed) Salah; (penalty scored) Hamed; (penalty scored) Mekky

16 September 2015 Semi final	Smouha	0–0 (3–4 p)	Zamalek	Alexandria
19:00 UTC+2				Stadium: Alexandria Stadium; Referee: Mohamed El Hanafy
	Penalties
	Salama (penalty scored); Mohareb (penalty scored); Manga (penalty missed); Ashraf (penalty missed); Sayed (penalty scored); Ezzat (penalty missed)		(penalty missed) M. Ibrahim; (penalty scored) Kahraba; (penalty scored) Hamed; (penalty scored) Fathy; (penalty missed) Mekky; (penalty scored) Tawfik

21 September 2015 Final	Al Ahly	0–2	Zamalek	Cairo
19:15 UTC+2			Morsy 11', 34'	Referee: Jonas Eriksson (Sweden)

=== 2015 CAF Confederation Cup ===
==== First round ====
15 March 2015 First leg	Zamalek (Egypt)	3–1	(Rwanda) Rayon Sports	Red Sea, Egypt
14:45 UTC+2	Eid 5' (.pen), 45'; Tawfik 36'		Muganza 54'	Stadium: El-Gouna Stadium; Referee: Mohamed Benouza (Algeria)

5 April 2015 Second leg	Rayon Sports (Rwanda)	0–3 (1–6 agg.)	(Egypt) Zamalek	Kigali
15:30 UTC+2			Eid 33'; Gabr 52'; Salah 56'	Stadium: Amahoro Stadium; Referee: Brian Nsubuga Miiro (Uganda)

==== Second round ====
19 April 2015 First leg	Zamalek (Egypt)	0–0	(Morocco) FUS Rabat	Suez, Egypt
19:00 UTC+2				Stadium: Suez Stadium; Referee: Ali Lemghaifry (Mauritania)

3 May 2015 Second leg	FUS Rabat (Morocco)	2–3 (2–3 agg.)	(Egypt) Zamalek	Rabat, Morocco
20:30 UTC+1	Saâdane 40'; Batna 72'		Morsi 15'; Gaber 84'; Emam 90+5'	Stadium: Stade de FUS; Referee: Youssef Essrayri (Tunisia)

==== Play-off round ====
17 May 2015 First leg	SM Sanga Balende (Democratic Republic of the Congo)	1–0	(Egypt) Zamalek	Lubumbashi, Democratic Republic of Congo
14:30 UTC+1	Matibi 13'			Stadium: Lubumbashi; Referee: Malang Diedhiou (Senegal)

7 June 2015 Second leg	Zamalek (Egypt)	3–1 (3–2 agg.)	(Democratic Republic of the Congo) SM Sanga Balende	Cairo, Egypt
21:00 UTC+2	Hefny 48'; Gaber 65'; Kamar 78'		Mandy 66'	Stadium: Petro Sport Stadium; Referee: Hamada Mousa (Madagascar)

==== Group stage ====
Pos	Team	Pld	W	D	L	GF	GA	GD	Pts	Qualification	ZAM	ORL	LEO	CSS
1	(Egypt) Zamalek	6	5	0	1	12	4	+8	15	Advance to knockout stage	—	4–1	2–0	1–0
2	(South Africa) Orlando Pirates	6	4	0	2	8	6	+2	12	Advance to knockout stage	1–2	—	2–0	2–0
3	(Republic of the Congo) AC Léopards	6	1	2	3	2	6	−4	5		1–0	0–1	—	0–0
4	(Tunisia) CS Sfaxien	6	0	2	4	2	8	−6	2		1–3	0–1	1–1	—

Source: CAF

27 June 2015	Zamalek (Egypt)	1–0	(Tunisia) CS Sfaxien	Petro Sport Stadium, Cairo
21:30 UTC+2	Cissé 90'	Report		Referee: Mohamed Benouza (Algeria)

11 July 2015	Orlando Pirates (South Africa)	1–2	(Egypt) Zamalek	Mbombela Stadium, Nelspruit
15:00 UTC+2	Majoro 67'	Report	Youssef 72'; Fathi 83'	Referee: Bernard Camille (Seychelles)

26 July 2015	Zamalek (Egypt)	2–0	(Republic of the Congo) AC Léopards	Petro Sport Stadium, Cairo
19:30 UTC+2	Morsi 2'; Hefny 36' (pen.) (yellow card) 37'; Emam (yellow card) 38'; Salah (yellow card) 62'; Tawfik (yellow card) 66'	Report	Bidimbou (yellow card) 30'; Nkodia (yellow card) 35'	Referee: El Fadil Mohamed Hussien (Sudan)

9 August 2015	AC Léopards (Republic of the Congo)	1–0	(Egypt) Zamalek	Stade Denis Sassou Nguesso, Dolisie
15:30 UTC+1	Mukendi 61'	Report

23 August 2015	CS Sfaxien (Tunisia)	1–3	(Egypt) Zamalek	Stade Taïeb Mhiri, Sfax
20:30 UTC+2	Maâloul 63' (pen.)	Report	Kahraba 54'; Hamoudi 80', 90+3' (pen.)	Referee: Rédouane Jiyed (Morocco)

13 September 2015	Zamalek (Egypt)	4–1	(South Africa) Orlando Pirates	Petro Sport Stadium, Cairo
20:30 UTC+2	Tawfik 14'; Mekky 37'; Fathi 62'; Kahraba 67'	Report	Manyisa 33'	Referee: Hudu Munyemana (Rwanda)

==== Knock-out stage ====
27 September 2015 First leg	Étoile du Sahel (Tunisia)	5–1	(Egypt) Zamalek	Stade Olympique de Sousse, Sousse
UTC+2	Tej 5', 82'; Bounedjah 10'; Brigui 35'; Ben Aziza 86'		Hefny 24'	Referee: Bernard Camille (Seychelles)

3 October 2015 Second leg	Zamalek (Egypt)	3–0 (4–5 agg.)	(Tunisia) Étoile du Sahel	Petro Sport Stadium, Cairo
UTC+2	Kahraba 11', 55' (pen.); Fathi 69'			Referee: Bakary Gassama (Gambia)
