= 2016–17 Zamalek SC season =

Zamalek
2016–17 season
- Chairman: (Egypt) Mortada Mansour
- Manager: (Egypt) Mo'men Soliman (until 19 November 2016) (Egypt) Mohamed Salah (Caretaker, until 28 November 2016) (Egypt) Mohammed Helmy (until 1 April 2017) (Portugal) Augusto Inácio
- Egyptian Premier League: 3rd
- Egyptian Super Cup: Winners
- Egypt Cup: Semi-final
- CAF Champions League: Group stage
- Arab Club Championship: Group stage
Home colours	Away colours

The 2016–17 season is Zamalek's 58th season in the Egyptian Premier League and 58th consecutive season in the top flight of Egyptian football. The club will participate in the Premier League, Egypt Cup, Super Cup, and the CAF Champions League.

== Team kit ==
The team kits for this season are manufactured by Joma.

Home	Away	Home (Temporary)

== Transfers ==
=== Players in ===
Date	Position	Name	From	Fee	Type	Source
8 May 2016	FW	(Egypt) Khaled Kamar	(Egypt) Smouha	Free	End of Loan	
2016	DF	(Egypt) Shawky El Said	(Egypt) Ismaily			
2016	DF	(Egypt) Ali Fathy	(Egypt)			
3 July 2016	DF	(Egypt) Islam Gamal	(Egypt) Ismaily	Free	End of Loan	
11 July 2016	MF	(Egypt) Ibrahim Salah	(Egypt) Smouha	Free	End of Loan	
19 July 2016	MF	(Egypt) M. Dunga	(Egypt) Misr Lel-Makkasa	9,000,000 L.E.	Transfer	
19 July 2016	DF	(Egypt) Hosny Fathy	(Egypt) Misr Lel-Makkasa	9,000,000 L.E.	Transfer	
19 July 2016	DF	(Egypt) Mohamed Mosa'd	(Egypt) Misr Lel-Makkasa	9,000,000 L.E.	Transfer	
19 July 2016	DF	(Egypt) Mohamed Nasef	(Egypt) ENPPI	8,000,000 L.E.	Transfer	
19 July 2016	FW	(Egypt) Osama Ibrahim	(Egypt) ENPPI	8,000,000 L.E.	Transfer	
July 2016	FW	(Egypt) Youssef Obama	(Egypt) Ittihad (Alexandria)	Free	End of Loan	
29 July 2016	FW	(Egypt) Ahmed Gaafar	(Egypt) Petrojet		Transfer	
1 August 2016	MF	(Egypt) Mohamed Magdy	(Egypt) Masry	5,000,000 L.E. + Hamada Tolba & Ahmed Samir	Transfer	
1 August 2016	DF	(Egypt) Mahmoud Hamdy	(Egypt) Tala'ea El-Gaish		Transfer	
2 August 2016	FW	(Nigeria) Stanley Ohawuchi	(Egypt) Wadi Degla		Loan	
10 August 2016	MF	(Egypt) Salah Atef (Rico)	(Egypt) Ittihad El Shorta		Transfer	
28 August 2016	MF	(Egypt) Ahmed Refaat	(Egypt) ENPPI		Transfer	
2017	FW	(Egypt) Hossam Salama	(Egypt) Smouha		Transfer	

Total expenditure: $? million

=== Players out ===
Date	Position	Name	To	Fee
30 June 2016	DF	(Egypt) Ahmed Hamoudi	(Switzerland) FC Basel	End of loan
12 July 2016	GK	(Egypt) Mohamed Abou Gabal	(Egypt) Smouha	
14 July 2016	DF	(Egypt) Kahraba	(Saudi Arabia) Ittihad (Jeddah)	Loan
31 July 2016	DF	(Egypt) Mohamed Adel Gomaa	(Egypt) Ismaily	Free
August 2016	DF	(Egypt) Hamada Tolba	(Egypt) Masry	As a part of Mohamed Magdy Transfer
August 2016	DF	(Egypt) Ahmed Samir	(Egypt) Masry	As a part of Mohamed Magdy Transfer
August 2016	FW	(Egypt) Ahmed Hassan Mekky	(Egypt) Smouha	
August 2016	FW	(Egypt) Khaled Kamar	(Egypt) Ittihad (Alexandria)	Loan
August 2016	FW	(Egypt) Mohamed Salem	(Egypt) Ittihad (Alexandria)	Loan
August 2016	DF	(Egypt) Hazem Emam	(Egypt) Ittihad (Alexandria)	Loan
1 August 2016	MF	(Egypt) Ibrahim Abdel-Khaleq	(Egypt) Wadi Degla	Loan
11 August 2016	FW	(Egypt) Youssef Obama	(Egypt) Wadi Degla	Loan

Total revenue:$?

Net income: ▼$?

== Friendlies ==
6 September 2016	Zamalek (Egypt)	3–0	(Egypt) Dakhlia	Petro Sport Stadium, Cairo

9 September 2016	Zamalek (Egypt)	1 – 0	(Egypt) Wadi Degla	Petro Sport Stadium, Cairo
	Stanley 23' (pen.)

6 October 2016	Zamalek (Egypt)	1 – 2	(Egypt) Ceramica Cleopatra	Helmy Zamora, Giza
	Stanley 7'		Mostafa Mehanna (?)

18 January 2017	Zamalek (Egypt)	5 – 0	(Egypt) Goldi

23 January 2017	Zamalek (Egypt)	3 – 0	(Egypt) Al-Eielamieen

26 January 2017	Zamalek (Egypt)	2 – 0	(Egypt) Saied Al-Mahalla

2 February 2017	Zamalek (Egypt)	4 – 0	(Egypt) Kahraba' Al-Qahira

Zamalek (Egypt)	2 – 0	(Egypt) El-Marg

11 June 2017	Zamalek (Egypt)	5 – 0	(Egypt) Misr Academy

== Competitions ==
=== Overall ===
Competition	Started round	Final position / round	First match	Last match
Egyptian Premier League	Matchday 3	3rd	29 September 2016	17 July 2017
Egyptian Super Cup	Final	Winners	10 February 2017	
Egypt Cup	Round of 32	Semi-final	17 February 2017	8 August 2017
CAF Champions League	First round	Group stage	12 March 2017	9 July 2017

Updated to match played 9 August 2016
Source: Competitions

=== Overview ===
Competition	Record							
Competition	G	W	D	L	GF	GA	GD	Win %
Premier League	6	4	2	0	6	1	+5	66.67
Super Cup	1	0	1	0	0	0	+0	0.00
Egypt Cup	0	0	0	0	0	0	+0	—
Champions League	0	0	0	0	0	0	+0	—
Total	0	0	0	0	0	0	+0	—

Updated to match played 25 September 2016
Source: Competitions

=== Position ===
Pos	Team	Pld	W	D	L	GF	GA	GD	Pts	Qualification or relegation
1	Al Ahly (C)	34	25	9	0	62	14	+48	84	Qualification for the Champions League
2	Misr Lel Makkasa	34	23	5	6	65	34	+31	74	Qualification for the Champions League
3	Zamalek (Note: Zamalek was deducted three points as they did not show up to their home match against Misr Lel Makkasa.)	34	20	6	8	42	24	+18	63	Qualification for the Confederation Cup (Note: Since the winners of the 2016–17 Egypt Cup, Al Ahly, qualified for African competition based on league position, the spot awarded to the Cup winner (Confederation Cup) was given to the Cup runners-up, Al Masry.)
4	Al Masry	34	19	5	10	51	36	+15	62	Qualification for the Confederation Cup
5	Smouha	34	15	12	7	49	40	+9	57	

Source: Soccerway
Rules for classification: 1) Points; 2) Head-to-Head points; 3) Head-to-Head goal difference; 4) Head-to-Head goal scored; 5) Head-to-Head away goal scored; 6) Goal difference; 7) Goal scored.
(C) Champions

=== Results ===
==== Results summary ====
Overall								Home						Away					
Pld	W	D	L	GF	GA	GD	Pts	W	D	L	GF	GA	GD	W	D	L	GF	GA	GD
14	10	4	0	19	2	+17	34	6	1	0	11	0	+11	4	3	0	8	2	+6

==== Results by matchday ====
Matchday	1	2	3	4	5	6	7	8	9	10	11	12	13	14	15	16	17	18	19	20	21	22	23	24	25	26	27	28	29	30	31	32	33	34
Ground	A	H	A	H	H	A	H	A	H	A	H	A	H	H	A	A	H	H	A	H	A	H	A	A	H	A	H	A	H	A	H	A	H	A
Result	W	D	W	W	W	D	W	D	W	D	W	W	W	W																				
Position	10	12	12	10	6	9	6	6	6	6	5	4	3	3																				

A = Away; H = Home; W = Win; D = Draw; L = Loss

==== Match details ====
29 September 2016 3	Al Nasr Lel Ta'din	0 – 2	Zamalek	Aswan Stadium, Aswan
20:00 UTC+2			Hefny (?); El-Said (?)	Referee: Tarek Magdy

27 October 2016 6	Zamalek	0 – 0	Smouha	Petro Sport Stadium, Cairo
20:00 UTC+2				Referee: Ibrahim Nour El Din

31 October 2016 7	ENPPI	1 – 2	Zamalek	Petro Sport Stadium, Cairo
20:30 UTC+2	(?)		Hamed (?); Morsy (?)	Referee: Mohamed Ma'rouf

4 November 2016 8	Zamalek	1 – 0	Masry	Borg El Arab Stadium, Alexandria
20:30 UTC+2	Gaffar 45+2'			Referee: Gehad Grisha

18 November 2016 9	Zamalek	1 – 0	Tanta
19:00 UTC+2	Shikabala (?)

22 November 2016 10	Ismaily	0 – 0	Zamalek	Ismailia Stadium, Ismailia
20:00 UTC+2				Referee: Mohamed Farouk

26 November 2016 11	Zamalek	3 – 0	Al Mokawloon	Petro Sport Stadium, Cairo
20:30 UTC+2	Stanley 19'; Salah 76'; Shikabala 77'			Referee: Mohamed Al-Hanafi

29 November 2016 12	Wadi Degla	1 – 1	Zamalek	Al-Salam Stadium
20:00 UTC+2	Ezzat (?)		Gabr 90'	Referee: Sabbahi

3 December 2016 13	Zamalek	3 – 0	Dakhlia
20:00 UTC+2	Shikabala (?); Riffat (?); Morsy (?)			Referee: Mahmoud Ashour

8 December 2016 14	Aswan	0 – 0	Zamalek
20:00 UTC+2

13 December 2016 15	Zamalek	1 – 0	Petrojet
20:00 UTC+2	(?)

17 December 2016 16	Ittihad	0 – 2	Zamalek	Borj El-Arab
20:00 UTC+2			Salah (?); Morsy (?)

21 December 2016 1	Intag El-Harby	0 – 1	Zamalek	Al-Salam Stadium
19:00 UTC+2			Morsy (?)	Referee: Mohamed El-Hanafy

=== 2016 Egyptian Super Cup ===
10 February 2017	Al Ahly	0 – 0 (1–3 p)	Zamalek	Mohammed Bin Zayed Stadium, Abu Dhabi
20:00 (UTC+4)				Attendance: 35,000; Referee: Pavel Královec (Czech Republic)
	Penalties
	Zakaria (penalty missed); Hegazy (penalty scored); Gomma (penalty missed); Ghaly (penalty missed)		(penalty scored) Morsy; (penalty scored) O. Ibrahim; (penalty scored) Refaat

=== 2017 Egypt Cup ===
17 February 2017 Round of 32	Zamalek	2 – 0	Olympic	Cairo
20:00	Morsy 52'; Dunga 81'	Report		Stadium: Petro Sport Stadium; Referee: (Egypt) Mahmoud Ashour

27 February 2017 Round of 16	Haras El Hodoud	0 – 1	Zamalek	Cairo
19:00		Report	Hefny 71'	Stadium: Petro Sport Stadium; Referee: (Egypt) Mohamed Adel

13 July 2017 Quarter Final	Tala'ea El-Gaish	v	Zamalek	Cairo
20:00				Stadium: Cairo Military Academy Stadium

=== 2017 CAF Champions League ===
==== First round ====
12 March 2017	Zamalek (Egypt)	4 – 1	(Nigeria) Enugu Rangers	Al-Salam Stadium, Cairo
18:00 UTC+2	Ohawuchi 8'; Salama 28'; Hefny 33'; Fathi 54' (pen.)	Report	Clement 83'	Attendance: 10,000; Referee: Daniel Bennett (South Africa)

19 March 2017	Enugu Rangers (Nigeria)	2 – 1 (3 – 5 agg.)	(Egypt) Zamalek	Nnamdi Azikiwe Stadium, Enugu
16:00 UTC+1	Olusesi 44'; Aguda 88' (pen.)	Report	Morsy 71'	Referee: Eric Otogo-Castane (Gabon)

Zamalek won 5–3 on aggregate.

==== Group stage ====
Pos	Team	Pld	W	D	L	GF	GA	GD	Pts	Qualification	USM	AHT	ZAM	CAP
1	(Algeria) USM Alger	6	3	2	1	12	5	+7	11	Quarter-finals	—	3–0	2–0	4–1
2	(Libya) Al-Ahli Tripoli	6	2	3	1	11	10	+1	9	Quarter-finals	1–1	—	0–0	4–2
3	(Egypt) Zamalek	6	1	3	2	6	8	−2	6 (Note: Head-to-head results: Zamalek 2–0 CAPS United, CAPS United 3–1 Zamalek (Zamalek won on away goals).)		1–1	2–2	—	2–0
4	(Zimbabwe) CAPS United	6	2	0	4	10	16	−6	6		2–1	2–4	3–1	—

Source: CAF
Notes:

12 May 2017 Match 1	(Egypt) Zamalek	2 - 0	(Zimbabwe) CAPS United	Borg El Arab
20:00	Morsy 56'; Ohawuchi 83'	Report	Chafa Taitamba (yellow card) 28'; Valentine Musarurwa (yellow card) 43'; Moses Muchenje (yellow card) 62'	Stadium: Borg El Arab Stadium; Referee: (Ivory Coast) Denis Dembélé

=== 2017 Arab Club Championship ===
==== Group B ====
Pos	Team	Pld	W	D	L	GF	GA	GD	Pts	Qualification
1	(Morocco) Fath Union Sport	3	1	2	0	7	3	+4	5	Advance to knockout stage
2	(Lebanon) Al-Ahed	3	1	2	0	3	2	+1	5	
3	(Egypt) Zamalek	3	1	1	1	4	4	0	4	
4	(Saudi Arabia) Al-Nassr	3	0	1	2	2	7	−5	1	

Source: Soccerway
