= 2016–17 Egypt Cup =

Tournament details
- Country: Egypt
- Dates: 14 October 2016 – 15 August 2017
- Teams: 294

Final positions
- Champions: Al Ahly (36th title)
- Runners-up: Al Masry
- Confederation Cup: Al Masry (Note: Since the winners of the 2016–17 Egypt Cup, Al Ahly, qualified for African competition based on league position, the spot awarded to the Cup winner (Confederation Cup) was given to the Cup runners-up, Al Masry.)

The 2016–17 Egypt Cup was the 85th edition of the oldest recognised football tournament in Africa. It was sponsored by Obour Land, and known as the Obour Land Cup for sponsorship purposes. 294 clubs were accepted into the tournament, and it began with the first qualifying round on 14 October 2016, and concluded with the final on 15 August 2017. The winner earns automatic qualification for the 2018 CAF Confederation Cup.

Egyptian Premier League side Zamalek were the defending champions, but were eliminated in the semi-finals by Al Masry.

Al Ahly won their 36th title after defeating Al Masry 2–1 in the final after the match went to extra time, winning their 1st Cup title since 10 years.

== Teams ==
Round	Clubs remaining	Clubs involved	Winners from previous round	New entries this round	Leagues entering at this round
Round of 32	32	32	14	18	Premier League
Round of 16	16	16	16	none	none
Quarter-finals	8	8	8	none	none
Semi-finals	4	4	4	none	none
Final	2	2	2	none	none

== Round and draw dates ==
The schedule is as follows.

Phase	Round	Draw date	Match date
Qualifying rounds	First qualifying round	10 October 2016	14 October – 2 November 2016
Qualifying rounds	Second qualifying round	2 November 2016	6–9 November 2016
Qualifying rounds	Third qualifying round	17 November 2016	21–23 November 2016
Qualifying rounds	Fourth qualifying round	28 November 2016	2–6 December 2016
Qualifying rounds	Fifth qualifying round	28 November 2016	9–10 December 2016
Main tournament	Round of 32	15 December 2016	21 December 2016 – 17 February 2017
Main tournament	Round of 16	15 December 2016	5 February – 1 March 2017
Main tournament	Quarter-finals	15 December 2016	13 May – 18 July 2017
Main tournament	Semi-finals	15 December 2016	8–9 August 2017
Main tournament	Final	15 December 2016	15 August 2017

== Qualifying rounds ==
The qualifying competition began with the first qualifying round on 14 October 2016. All of the competing teams that are not members of the Premier League will have to compete in the qualifying rounds to secure a place in the Round of 32. The final (fifth) qualifying round was played on 9 and 10 December 2016.

== Bracket ==
The following is the bracket which the Egypt Cup resembled. Numbers in parentheses next to the match score represent the results of a penalty shoot-out.

Round of 32; 21 December 2016 – 17 February 2017
Misr Lel Makkasa	2
Ittihad El Shorta	1
Petojet	1
Al Assiouty Sport	0
Ismaily	2
Arab El Raml	1
Smouha	3
Al Merreikh	2
Al Ahly	6
Aluminium Nag Hammâdi	0
El Dakhleya	1
El Gouna	0
Wadi Degla	3
Pharco	0
Tanta	2
Aswan	0
El Sharkia (a.e.t.)	1
Al Nasr Lel Taa'den	0
Tala'ea El Gaish	2
Kahrabaa Ismailia	1
Al Mokawloon	1 (4)
Haras El Hodoud (p)	1 (5)
Zamalek	2
Olympic Club	0
Al Masry (a.e.t.)	3
Ghazl El Mahalla	1
El Entag El Harby	3
FC Masr	1
Al Ittihad	3
El Sekka El Hadid	1
ENPPI	2
Fayoum	0

Round of 16; 5 February – 1 March 2017
Misr Lel Makkasa	3
Petrojet	0
Ismaily	0
Smouha	1
Al Ahly	2
El Dakhleya	1
Wadi Degla (a.e.t.)	1
Tanta	0
El Sharkia	0
Tala'ea El Gaish	1
Haras El Hodoud	0
Zamalek	1
Al Masry	2
El Entag El Harby	0
Al Ittihad	0
ENPPI	3

Quarter-finals; 13 May – 18 July 2017
Misr Lel Makkasa	0
Smouha (a.e.t.)	1
Al Ahly	4
Wadi Degla	1
Tala'ea El Gaish	0
Zamalek	3
Al Masry (p)	1 (5)
ENPPI	1 (4)

Semi-finals; 8–9 August 2017
Smouha	0
Al Ahly	4
Zamalek	0
Al Masry	2

Final; 15 August 2017
Al Ahly (a.e.t.)	2
Al Masry	1

== Round of 32 ==
A total of 32 clubs played in this round; 14 winners of the fifth qualifying round, and 18 teams from the Premier League entering in this round. The draw was held on 15 December 2016 at the EFA headquarters in Gezira, Cairo. The matches were played from 21 December 2016 to 17 February 2017. The round included one team from Level 3 still in the competition, Arab El Raml, who were the lowest-ranked team in this round.

All times are CAT (UTC+2).

21 December 2016	Al Ittihad (1)	3–1	El Sekka El Hadid (2)	Alexandria
15:00	Tarek 43'; Kamar 73'; Osama 90+2'	Report	Farouk 75' (pen.)	Stadium: Haras El Hodoud Stadium; Referee: Ahmed Anas

22 December 2016	Petrojet (1)	1–0	Al Assiouty Sport (2)	Suez
14:00	Shimelis 35'	Report		Stadium: Suez Stadium; Referee: Badawy Hemida

22 December 2016	ENPPI (1)	2–0	Fayoum (2)	Cairo
14:00	Marey 26', 33'	Report		Stadium: Petro Sport Stadium; Referee: Ahmed Saleh

22 December 2016	Smouha (1)	3–2	Al Merreikh (2)	Alexandria
17:00	Raouf 8'; Farid 87' (pen.); Sayed 90+1'	Report	Gedo 14' (pen.), 58'	Stadium: Haras El Hodoud Stadium; Referee: Amr Aied

22 December 2016	Al Ahly (1)	6–0	Aluminium Nag Hammâdi (2)	Cairo
20:00	Gamal 14', 51'; Zakaria 23'; Moteab 65', 85', 86'	Report		Stadium: Al Salam Stadium; Referee: Mohamed Saber

23 December 2016	El Dakhleya (1)	1–0	El Gouna (2)	Cairo
14:30	Mohamed 90+2'	Report		Stadium: Police Academy Stadium; Referee: Osama Ismail

23 December 2016	Tala'ea El Gaish (1)	2–1	Kahrabaa Ismailia (2)	Cairo
14:30	Abdel Malek 62'; Al Badari 70'	Report	Kamal 31'	Stadium: Cairo Military Academy Stadium; Referee: Hossam El Galad

23 December 2016	Wadi Degla (1)	3–0	Pharco (2)	Cairo
17:30	Sherif 53', 83'; Helal 54'	Report		Stadium: Cairo International Stadium; Referee: Mahmoud Desouky

24 December 2016	Al Mokawloon (1)	1–1 (a.e.t.) (4–5 p)	Haras El Hodoud (2)	Cairo
15:00	Ali 90+2'	Report	M. Gamal 90+6'	Stadium: Cairo International Stadium; Referee: Mohamed Al Amshitey
	Penalties
	Adel (penalty scored); O. Gamal (penalty missed); Gedo (penalty scored); Samir (penalty scored); El Shayeb (penalty scored)		(penalty scored) El Fayoumi; (penalty scored) Al Masry; (penalty scored) Mekky; (penalty scored) Samy; (penalty scored) Mubarak

25 December 2016	Ismaily (1)	2–1	Arab El Raml (3)	Ismailia
14:00	Bambo 15'; El Saidy 74'	Report	Farahat 11'	Stadium: Ismailia Stadium; Referee: Ahmed El Dalil

25 December 2016	Al Masry (1)	3–1 (a.e.t.)	Ghazl El Mahalla (2)	Alexandria
17:00	Wilson 45+3'; Ah. Gomaa 105+1'; Kaboria 120+1'	Report	Sobhi 37'	Stadium: Haras El Hodoud Stadium; Referee: Bahaa Atef

25 December 2016	Misr Lel Makkasa (1)	2–1	Ittihad El Shorta (2)	Fayoum
20:00	Hesham 2'; El Shahat 29' (pen.)	Report	Patrick 83'	Stadium: Fayoum Stadium; Referee: Mahmoud Nagy

25 December 2016	El Entag El Harby (1)	3–1	FC Masr (2)	Cairo
20:00	Oukka 75' (pen.); Magdy 77'; Oukri 85'	Report	Kamal 88' (pen.)	Stadium: Al Salam Stadium; Referee: Ekramy Alaa

2 January 2017	Tanta (1)	2–0	Aswan (1)	Tanta
14:00	Tetteh 81', 90+1'	Report		Stadium: Tanta Stadium; Referee: Amr Ramadan

3 January 2017	El Sharkia (1)	1–0 (a.e.t.)	Al Nasr Lel Taa'den (1)	Banha
14:00	Shika 119'	Report		Stadium: Banha Stadium; Referee: Sameh Farouk

17 February 2017	Zamalek (1)	2–0	Olympic Club (2)	Cairo
20:00	Morsy 52'; Dunga 81'	Report		Stadium: Petro Sport Stadium; Referee: Mahmoud Ashour

== Round of 16 ==
A total of 16 clubs played in this round; all winners of the previous round. The draw was held on 15 December 2016 at the EFA headquarters in Gezira, Cairo. The matches were played from 5 February to 1 March 2017. The round included one team from Level 2 still in the competition, Haras El Hodoud, who were the lowest-ranked team in this round.

All times are CAT (UTC+2).

5 February 2017	Al Masry (1)	2–0	El Entag El Harby (1)	Alexandria
16:00	El Shamy 1'; Shoukry 75'	Report		Stadium: Haras El Hodoud Stadium; Referee: Mohamed El Sabahy

7 February 2017	El Sharkia (1)	0–1	Tala'ea El Gaish (1)	Suez
16:00		Report	Dao 18'	Stadium: Suez Stadium; Referee: Said Hamza

7 February 2017	Wadi Degla (1)	1–0 (a.e.t.)	Tanta (1)	Ismailia
19:00	Arafat 117'	Report		Stadium: Ismailia Stadium; Referee: Mohamed Salama

8 February 2017	Al Ittihad (1)	0–3	ENPPI (1)	Suez
16:00		Report	Hamdy 3'; Kaoud 74'; Lamah 79'	Stadium: Suez Stadium; Referee: Awad Saafan

8 February 2017	Misr Lel Makkasa (1)	3–0	Petrojet (1)	Cairo
19:00	Nabil 36'; Antwi 51', 67'	Report		Stadium: Cairo International Stadium; Referee: Mohamed Abou Khater

9 February 2017	Ismaily (1)	0–1	Smouha (1)	Cairo
18:00		Report	Mekky 71'	Stadium: Petro Sport Stadium; Referee: Abdel Aziz El Sayed

27 February 2017	Haras El Hodoud (2)	0–1	Zamalek (1)	Cairo
19:00		Report	Hefny 71'	Stadium: Petro Sport Stadium; Referee: Mohamed Adel

1 March 2017	Al Ahly (1)	2–1	El Dakhleya (1)	Cairo
19:00	Gamal 34'; Ghaly 49'	Report	Samir 63'	Stadium: Petro Sport Stadium; Referee: Ahmed El Ghandour

== Quarter-finals ==
A total of 8 clubs played in this round; all winners of the previous round. The draw was held on 15 December 2016 at the EFA headquarters in Gezira, Cairo. The matches were played from 13 May to 18 July 2017.

All times are CAT (UTC+2).

13 May 2017	Al Masry (1)	1–1 (a.e.t.) (5–4 p)	ENPPI (1)	Suez
21:15	El Shamy 90+5'	Report	Magdy 39'	Stadium: Suez Stadium; Referee: Nader Kamr El Dawla
	Penalties
	El Shamy (penalty scored); Shawky (penalty scored); Kaboria (penalty scored); Ayman (penalty scored); Kouao (penalty scored)		(penalty scored) Hamdy; (penalty missed) Abdel Aziz; (penalty scored) Fawzy; (penalty scored) Soliman; (penalty scored) Sabry

12 July 2017	Al Ahly (1)	4–1	Wadi Degla (1)	Cairo
20:00	Gomaa 29' (pen.), 77' (pen.); Zakaria 88'; Moteab 90+2'	Report	Anwar 25'	Stadium: Al Salam Stadium; Referee: Ibrahim Nour El Din

13 July 2017	Tala'ea El Gaish (1)	0–3	Zamalek (1)	Cairo
21:00		Report	Ohawuchi 45+3'; Youssef 68'; H. Fathy 76'	Stadium: Al Salam Stadium; Referee: Mohamed Farouk

18 July 2017	Misr Lel Makkasa (1)	0–1 (a.e.t.)	Smouha (1)	Cairo
20:00		Report	Ezzat 97'	Stadium: Cairo International Stadium; Referee: Ahmed El Ghandour

== Semi-finals ==
A total of 4 clubs played in this round; all winners of the previous round. The draw was held on 15 December 2016 at the EFA headquarters in Gezira, Cairo. The matches were played on 8 and 9 August 2017.

All times are CAT (UTC+2).

8 August 2017	Zamalek (1)	0–2	Al Masry (1)	Alexandria
20:00		Report	Ab. Gomaa 86' (pen.); Bika 90+5'	Stadium: Borg El Arab Stadium; Referee: Mahmoud Ashour

9 August 2017	Smouha (1)	0–4	Al Ahly (1)	Alexandria
20:00		Report	Ajayi 38'; Soliman 40', 55'; Gomaa 67'	Stadium: Borg El Arab Stadium; Referee: Mahmoud Al Banna

== Final ==
The final was played on 15 August 2017 at Borg El Arab Stadium.

15 August 2017
20:00 CAT

Al Ahly (1)	2–1 (a.e.t.)	Al Masry (1)
Amr Gamal 117'; Fathy 120+2'	Report	A. Bika 103'

Borg El Arab Stadium, Alexandria
Referee: Svein Oddvar Moen (Norway)
