= 2015–16 Egypt Cup =

2014–15 Egypt Cup
Tournament details
- Country: Egypt
- Teams: 276

Final positions
- Champions: Zamalek
- Runners-up: Al Ahly
- Confederation Cup: Al Masry (Note: Since both finalists of the Egypt Cup qualified for the Champions League based on their league position, the Confederation Cup spot awarded to the Egypt Cup winner was passed to the fourth-placed team in the Egyptian Premier League, Al Masry.)

Tournament statistics
- Matches played: 31
- Goals scored: 67 (2.16 per match)
- Top goal scorer(s): Basem Morsy (5 goals)

The 2015–16 Egypt Cup was the 84th edition of the oldest recognised football tournament in Africa. It was sponsored by Obour Land, and known as the Obour Land Cup for sponsorship purposes. The winner qualifies for the 2017 CAF Confederation Cup.

Egyptian Premier League side Zamalek were the defending champions and successfully defended their title after they defeated Al Ahly 3–1 in the final.

== Schedule and format ==
Round	Draw date	Date	Fixtures	Clubs	Format details
Preliminary round	10 December 2015	13–14 January 2016	14	46 → 32	Local team seeding: Draw of lots. Knock-out tournament type: Single match.
Round of 32	28 February 2016	19–31 March 2016	16	32 → 16	New entries: Clubs participating in the Egyptian Premier League will gain entry. Local team seeding: Matches will be played on neutral stadiums. Knock-out tournament type: Single match.
Round of 16	28 February 2016	10–27 April 2016; 12 July 2016	8	16 → 8	Local team seeding: Matches will be played on neutral stadiums. Knock-out tournament type: Single match.
Quarter-finals	28 February 2016	15 May 2016 – 1 August 2016	4	8 → 4	Local team seeding: Matches will be played on neutral stadiums. Knock-out tournament type: Single match.
Semi-finals	28 February 2016	3–4 August 2016	2	4 → 2	Local team seeding: Matches will be played on neutral stadiums. Knock-out tournament type: Single match.
Final	28 February 2016	8 August 2016	1	2 → 1	Single match, stadium TBD by EFA. CAF Confederation Cup qualification: winner will qualify for 2017 CAF Confederation Cup.

== Bracket ==
The following is the bracket which the Egypt Cup resembled. Numbers in parentheses next to the match score represent the results of a penalty shoot-out.

Round of 32; 19–31 March 2016
Petrojet (p)	0 (4)
Sohag	0 (2)
Al Ittihad	2
Aswan	1
Zamalek	2
Shabab El Daba'a	0
Ittihad El Shorta	6
Ghazl Port Said	0
Ismaily (p)	0 (4)
El Raja	0 (2)
Tala'ea El Gaish	1
Tanta	0
El Dakhleya	1
Fayoum	0
Al Masry (p)	0 (4)
Al Nasr Lel Taa'den	0 (3)
Misr Lel Makkasa	0
FC Masr	1
Al Mokawloon	1 (3)
Al Merreikh (p)	1 (5)
Wadi Degla	1
El Qanah	0
ENPPI	3
Al Nasr	0
Al Ahly	3
Dayrout	0
Haras El Hodoud	3
El Mansoura	0
Smouha	2
Gomhoriat Shebin	0
El Entag El Harby	1
Ghazl El Mahalla	0

Round of 16; 10–27 April 2016; 12 July 2016
Petrojet	1
Al Ittihad	3
Zamalek	2
Ittihad El Shorta	1
Ismaily (p)	0 (5)
Tala'ea El Gaish	0 (4)
El Dakhleya	1
Al Masry (a.e.t.)	2
FC Masr	0
Al Merreikh (a.e.t.)	1
Wadi Degla	0
ENPPI (a.e.t.)	2
Al Ahly	2
Haras El Hodoud	1
Smouha	1
El Entag El Harby	0

Quarter-finals; 15 May–1 August 2016
Al Ittihad	1
Zamalek	2
Ismaily	2
Al Masry	0
Al Merreikh	2 (3)
ENPPI (p)	2 (4)
Al Ahly	1
Smouha	0

Semi-finals; 3–4 August 2016
Zamalek	4
Ismaily	0
ENPPI	1
Al Ahly	2

Final; 8 August 2016
Zamalek	3
Al Ahly	1

== Round of 32 ==
The draw was held on 28 February 2016 at 14:00 (UTC+2) at the EFA headquarters in Gezira, Cairo.

If a match ended as a draw in this round, the two teams go straight to penalty shootout.

Matches took place from 19 to 31 March 2016.

19 March 2016	Al Masry	0–0 (4–3 p)	Al Nasr Lel Taa'den	Ismailia
15:30		Report		Stadium: Ismailia Stadium; Referee: Nader Zaky
	Penalties
	Magdy (penalty scored); Ayman (penalty scored); Kaboria (penalty missed); Azab (penalty scored); Yasser (penalty scored)		(penalty missed) Abdel Fattah; (penalty scored) Shaaban; (penalty scored) Mohamed; (penalty missed) Yehia; (penalty scored) Mostafa

22 March 2016	Wadi Degla	1–0	El Qanah	Ismailia
15:30	Mapuku 59'	Report		Stadium: Ismailia Stadium; Referee: Mohamed Fahmy

22 March 2016	Al Ittihad	2–1	Aswan	Cairo
17:45	Kouao 14'; Obama 60'	Report	Salama 78' (pen.)	Stadium: Al Salam Stadium; Referee: Ahmed Saleh

22 March 2016	Haras El Hodoud	3–0	El Mansoura	Alexandria
17:45	Abdel Kader 38'; Benzema 77'; Nagah 90+1'	Report		Stadium: Alexandria Stadium; Referee: Ibrahim Mahgoub

22 March 2016	El Dakhleya	1–0	Fayoum	Cairo
20:00	Shehab 87'	Report		Stadium: Petro Sport Stadium; Referee: Wael Abdel Aal

23 March 2016	Ittihad El Shorta	6–0	Ghazl Port Said	Ismailia
15:30	El Ghandour 8'; Abdel Salam 36'; Kamal 68', 71', 83'; Ouso 70'	Report		Stadium: Ismailia Stadium; Referee: Ashraf Abou El Nour

23 March 2016	Smouha	2–0	Gomhoriat Shebin	El Mahalla
15:30	Kouakou 73'; Salama 77'	Report		Stadium: Ghazl El Mahalla Stadium; Referee: Mohamed Youssef

23 March 2016	Petrojet	0–0 (4–2 p)	Sohag	Fayoum
17:45		Report		Stadium: Fayoum Stadium; Referee: Egiez El Sharbasy
	Penalties
	Magdy (penalty scored); Tarek (penalty scored); A. El Shenawy (penalty scored); Saber (penalty scored)		(penalty missed) Farid; (penalty scored) Abdel Raouf; (penalty scored) Ibrahim; (penalty missed) El Sayed

23 March 2016	Ismaily	0–0 (4–2 p)	El Raja	Cairo
17:45		Report		Stadium: Osman Ahmed Osman Stadium; Referee: Ashraf Abdel Wahed
	Penalties
	Samir (penalty scored); Adel (penalty scored); Hassan (penalty scored); Hamad (penalty scored)		(penalty scored) Kimo; (penalty missed) Hafez; (penalty scored) Fathy; (penalty missed) Sokrat

23 March 2016	Tala'ea El Gaish	1–0	Tanta	Cairo
20:00	Youssef 29'	Report		Stadium: Al Salam Stadium; Referee: Amr Galal

24 March 2016	Al Mokawloon	1–1 (3–5 p)	Al Merreikh	Ismailia
15:30	Adel 82'	Report	Abdel Baqi 90+8'	Stadium: Ismailia Stadium; Referee: Ahmed El Dalil
	Penalties
	Adel (penalty scored); Fadl (penalty scored); Shaaban (penalty scored); Samara (penalty missed)		(penalty scored) Abdel Razek; (penalty scored) Wafaa El Din; (penalty scored) Abdel Aal; (penalty scored) El Aaidy; (penalty scored) El Sayed

24 March 2016	El Entag El Harby	1–0	Ghazl El Mahalla	Alexandria
17:45	Amin 67'	Report		Stadium: Alexandria Stadium; Referee: Kamel Mohamed

24 March 2016	Misr Lel Makkasa	0–1	FC Masr	Cairo
17:45		Report	Gaafar 30'	Stadium: Petro Sport Stadium; Referee: Ahmed El Sayed

24 March 2016	ENPPI	3–0	Al Nasr	Cairo
20:00	Farrag 32'; Koné 63'; Shroyda 71'	Report		Stadium: Al Salam Stadium; Referee: Hisham Tawfiq

30 March 2016	Al Ahly	3–0	Dayrout	Alexandria
19:00	Fathy 11'; El Sheikh 61', 64'	Report		Stadium: Alexandria Stadium; Referee: Mohamed Saber

31 March 2016	Zamalek	2–0	Shabab El Daba'a	Cairo
19:00	Gabr 33'; Hamoudi 72'	Report		Stadium: Petro Sport Stadium; Referee: Yasser Fawzy

== Round of 16 ==
The draw was held on 28 February 2016 at 14:00 (UTC+2) at the EFA headquarters in Gezira, Cairo.

If a match ended as a draw in this round, the two teams goes to Extra time. If the score remains even after the Extra time the two team goes to penalty shootout.

Matches took place from 10 April–12 July 2016.

10 April 2016	El Dakhleya	1–2 (a.e.t.)	Al Masry	Ismailia
18:00	Abdel Naim 49'	Report	Akakpo 70'; Mourad 91'	Stadium: Ismailia Stadium; Referee: Mohamed El Hanafy

11 April 2016	Petrojet	1–3	Al Ittihad	Cairo
18:00	Gaafar 28'	Report	Kabonga 32'; Kouao 65', 84'	Stadium: Al Salam Stadium; Referee: Sameh Farouk

13 April 2016	Ismaily	0–0 (a.e.t.) (5–4 p)	Tala'ea El Gaish	Cairo
17:00		Report		Stadium: Al Salam Stadium; Referee: Mahmoud Bassiouny
	Penalties
	Samir F. (penalty scored); Marwan (penalty missed); El Wahsh (penalty scored); Gamal (penalty scored); Hosny (penalty scored); Adel (penalty scored)		(penalty scored) Shedid; (penalty scored) Abdel Malek; (penalty missed) Rizk; (penalty scored) Salah; (penalty scored) Tawfik; (penalty missed) Mohsen

13 April 2016	Smouha	1–0	El Entag El Harby	Cairo
20:00	Sayed 44'	Report		Stadium: Petro Sport Stadium; Referee: Ahmed El Ghandour

16 April 2016	FC Masr	0–1 (a.e.t.)	Al Merreikh	Ismailia
17:00		Report	Farhoud 117'	Stadium: Ismailia Stadium; Referee: Osama Ismail

27 April 2016	Wadi Degla	0–2 (a.e.t.)	ENPPI	Cairo
20:00		Report	Martínez 110'; Kaoud 120+1'	Stadium: Al Salam Stadium; Referee: Hisham Abdel Hamid

12 July 2016	Al Ahly	2–1	Haras El Hodoud	Alexandria
18:30	Moteab 31' (pen.); El Solia 67'	Report	Benzema 84' (pen.)	Stadium: Alexandria Stadium; Referee: Abdel Aziz El Sayed

12 July 2016	Zamalek	2–1	Ittihad El Shorta	Cairo
21:30	Abdel Khalek 15'; Fathy 90+6'	Report	Mostafa 44' (pen.)	Stadium: Petro Sport Stadium; Referee: Ahmed Yaqoub (Jordan)

== Quarter-finals ==
The draw was held on 28 February 2016 at 14:00 (UTC+2) at the EFA headquarters in Gezira, Cairo.

If a match ended as a draw in this round, the two teams goes to Extra time. If the score remains even after the Extra time the two team goes to penalty shootout.

Matches took place from 15 May–1 August 2016.

15 May 2016	Al Merreikh	2–2 (a.e.t.) (3–4 p)	ENPPI	Ismailia
19:00	Shaaban 88'; Abdel Baqi 108'	Report	Abdel Zaher 59'; Ashour 119'	Stadium: Ismailia Stadium; Referee: Sheriff Hassan
	Penalties
	Abdel Razek (penalty scored); Zayed (penalty missed); Wafa'ey (penalty missed); El Sayed (penalty scored); Gamal (penalty scored)		(penalty scored) Martínez; (penalty scored) El Halwani; (penalty scored) Shroyda; (penalty missed) Ashour; (penalty scored) Tobah

15 July 2016	Ismaily	2–0	Al Masry	Alexandria
19:00	Hosny 42', 87'	Report		Stadium: Alexandria Stadium; Referee: Mahmoud El Banna

21 July 2016	Al Ittihad	1–2	Zamalek	Alexandria
20:30	Obama 35'	Report	Shikabala 63'; Morsy 75'	Stadium: Borg El Arab Stadium; Referee: Mohamed El Hanafy

1 August 2016	Al Ahly	1–0	Smouha	Suez
20:30	Samir 45'	Report		Stadium: Suez Stadium; Referee: Ibrahim Nour El Din

== Semi-finals ==
The draw was held on 28 February 2016 at 14:00 (UTC+2) at the EFA headquarters in Gezira, Cairo.

If a match ended as a draw in this round, the two teams goes to Extra time. If the score remains even after the Extra time the two team goes to penalty shootout.

Matches took place on 3 and 4 August 2016.

3 August 2016	Zamalek	4–0	Ismaily	Alexandria
20:30	Hefny 50'; Morsy 63', 70'; Mayuka 86' (pen.)	Report		Stadium: Borg El Arab Stadium; Referee: Mohamed Farouk

4 August 2016	ENPPI	1–2	Al Ahly	Suez
20:30	El Shamy 29'	Report	Zakaria 82'; Samir 85'	Stadium: Suez Stadium; Referee: Samir Osman

== Final ==
The final took place on 8 August 2016 at Borg El Arab Stadium in Alexandria. Zamalek were the "home" team (for administrative purposes), as they played the first semi-final match.

8 August 2016
20:30 UTC+2

Zamalek	3–1	Al Ahly
Morsy 20', 25' (pen.); M. Fathi 59'	Report	Said 33' (pen.)

Borg El Arab Stadium, Alexandria
Referee: Andó-Szabó Sándor (Hungary)

== Top goalscorers ==
The following are the top scorers of the Egypt Cup, sorted first by number of goals, and then alphabetically if necessary. Goals scored in penalty shoot-outs are not included.

Rank	Player	Team	Goals
1	(Egypt) Basem Morsy	Zamalek	5
2	(Egypt) Amr Kamal	Ittihad El Shorta	3
2	(Ivory Coast) Hermann Kouao	Al Ittihad	3
4	(Egypt) Hosny Abd Rabo	Ismaily	2
4	(Egypt) Ahmed Abdel Baqi	Al Merreikh	2
4	(Egypt) Mohamed Benzema	Haras El Hodoud	2
4	(Egypt) Mostafa Fathi	Zamalek	2
4	(Egypt) Youssef Obama	Al Ittihad	2
4	(Egypt) Saad Samir	Al Ahly	2
4	(Egypt) Ahmed El Sheikh	Al Ahly	2
