= Abdoulaye Cissé =

Abdoulaye Cissé may refer to:

- Abdoulaye Cissé (footballer, born 1983), Ivorian-born Burkinabé footballer
- Abdoulaye Cissé (footballer, born 1996), Guinean footballer
