= Ahmed Dowidar =

Egyptian footballer (born 1987)

Personal information
- Full name: Ahmed Mohamed Abdallah el-Sayed Dowidar
- Date of birth: 29 October 1987 (age 39)
- Place of birth: Giza, Egypt
- Height: 1.80 m (5 ft 11 in)
- Position: Defender

Youth career
- 2000–2005: Zamalek
- 2005–2008: Ittihad El Shorta

Senior career*
Years	Team	Apps	(Gls)
2008–2014	Ittihad El Shorta	119	(13)
2013	→ Kazma (loan)		
2014–2017	Zamalek	38	(1)
2017	→ Smouha (loan)	5	(0)
2017–2018	Ismaily	6	(0)
2018–2020	El Entag El Harby	16	(0)
2020–2022	Misr / ZED		

International career
2010–2017	Egypt	9	(0)
Medal record
Representing Egypt
Men's football
Africa Cup of Nations
Runner-up	2017
- * Club domestic league appearances and goals

Ahmed Mohamed Abdallah el-Sayed Dowidar (Arabic: أحمد محمد عبدالله السيد دويدار; born 29 October 1987) is an Egyptian professional footballer who plays as a defender. Dowidar is a former member of the Egypt national team.

== Career ==
Although Dowidar plays as a defender, he has a good goal scoring record. This is mainly because he is a master penalty taker. He scored a total of four goals in the 2008–09 Egyptian Premier League and another six in the 2009–10 season.

He played as a defender for Kazma Sporting Club in the Kuwaiti Premier League in 2013.

Several Egyptian teams, including both Egyptian giants Al Ahly and Zamalek, revealed their interest in Dowidar. However, Ittihad El-Shorta issued a hands-off warning over these interests.

On 15 June 2014, Dowidar signed a three-year contract with Zamalek.

On 25 January 2017, Dowidar announce the completion of his move to Alexandrian side Smouha SC

== Honours ==
Zamalek

- Egyptian Premier League: 2014–15
- Egypt Cup: 2015, 2016
