= Ibrahim Salah =

Ibrahim Salah may refer to:

- Ibrahim Salah (footballer, born 1987), Egyptian football defensive midfielder
- Ibrahim Salah (footballer, born 2001), Belgian-Moroccan football winger
