= Reda El Azab =

Egyptian footballer (born 1986)

Reda El-Azab
Personal information
- Full name: Reda El-Azab
- Date of birth: July 9, 1986 (age 40)
- Height: 1.77 m (5 ft 10 in)
- Position: Right-back

Team information
- Current team: Tersana

Youth career
- 2003–2007: Baladeyet El-Mahalla

Senior career*
Years	Team	Apps	(Gls)
2007–2008	Baladeyet El-Mahalla	13	(0)
2008–2014	Ittihad El-Shorta	109	(6)
2014–2015	Zamalek	2	(1)
2015–2016	Tala'ea El Gaish	6	(0)
2016–2019	Tanta	57	(1)
2019–	Tersana	?	(?)
- * Club domestic league appearances and goals

Reda El-Azab (Arabic: رضا العزب; born July 9, 1986) is an Egyptian footballer. He plays as a right-back for Egyptian Second Division side Tersana SC.

== Club career ==
He started his career with Baladeyet El-Mahalla youth team then moved to Ittihad El-Shorta. He moved to Zamalek in 2014.

== Honours ==
=== Club ===
Zamalek SC

- Egyptian Premier League (1): 2014-2015
