= Mohamed Shaaban =

Egyptian footballer (born 1984)

Personal information
- Full name: Mohamed Shaaban
- Date of birth: December 25, 1984 (age 41)
- Place of birth: Egypt
- Height: 1.75 m (5 ft 9 in)
- Position: Attacking midfielder

Team information
- Current team: Arab Contractors- El Mokawloon

Senior career*
Years	Team	Apps	(Gls)
2007–2008	Ittihad El-Shorta	0	(0)
2008–2010	Petrojet	38	(2)
2010–2014	ENPPI Club	55	(2)
2014–2015	Zamalek	6	(0)
2015–	Arab Contractors SC		

International career
2009	Egypt	4	(0)
- * Club domestic league appearances and goals

Mohamed Shaaban (Arabic: محمد شعبان) (born 25 December 1984 in Egypt), is an Egyptian football attacking midfielder who currently plays for (Egyptian Premier League) side (El Mokawloon) as well as the Egyptian national team.

== Honours ==
=== Club ===
Zamalek SC

- Egyptian Premier League: 2014-15
