= Maarouf Youssef =

Nigerian-born Burkinabé footballer (born 1992)

Maroof Yusuf
Personal information
- Full name: Maroof Yusuf
- Date of birth: 20 December 1992 (age 33)
- Place of birth: Lagos, Nigeria
- Height: 1.79 m (5 ft 10 in)
- Position: Midfielder

Team information
- Current team: Al Mokawloon (on loan from Zamalek)
- Number: 28

Senior career*
Years	Team	Apps	(Gls)
2010–2011	Kwara United		
2011–2014	Ittihad El Shorta	55	(6)
2014–	Zamalek	100	(5)
2018–2019	→ Al-Shorta (loan)	30	(3)
2019–	→ Al Mokawloon (loan)	13	(0)
- * Club domestic league appearances and goals as of 15 May 2018

Maroof Yusuf (born 20 December 1992) is a Nigerian-born Burkinabé footballer who plays for Al Mokawloon on loan from Zamalek as a midfielder.

== Early life ==
Yussuf was born in Kwara state, Nigeria, where he attended the Government Secondary School, Ilorin

== Club career ==
Yussuf played for Egyptian clubs Ittihad El Shorta and Zamalek before moving to Al-Fateh of the Saudi Professional League in July 2018.

== International career ==
Maarouf is of Burkinabé descent. He played for Burkina Faso on 14 November 2012 in a 1–0 friendly win against DR Congo. In May, 2017, he was called up to Nigeria's squad for of the 2019 Africa Cup of Nations qualifiers match against South Africa

In July 2018 he began the process of obtaining Egyptian nationality.

== Honours ==
=== Club ===
Zamalek SC

- Egyptian Premier League: 2014–15
- Egypt Cup: 2015, 2016, 2018
- Egyptian Super Cup: 2016

Al-Shorta

- Iraqi Premier League: 2018–19
