= Ibrahim Salah (footballer, born 1987) =

Egyptian footballer

Ibrahim Salah Abdel Fattah
Personal information
- Full name: Ibrahim Salah Abdel Fattah
- Date of birth: 1 April 1987 (age 39)
- Place of birth: Mansourah, Egypt
- Height: 1.76 m (5 ft 9 in)
- Position: Defensive midfielder

Youth career
- El Mansoura

Senior career*
Years	Team	Apps	(Gls)
2006–2009	El Mansoura	42	(0)
2009–2013	Zamalek	73	(3)
2013–2014	Al-Orobah	17	(0)
2014–2017	Zamalek	54	(3)
2016	→ Smouha (Loan)	17	(1)
2017–2021	Al Mokawloon	76	(2)
2021–2022	Ghazl El Mahalla	76	(2)
2022-2023	Petrojet FC		

International career^{‡}
2010–2017	Egypt	34	(1)
- * Club domestic league appearances and goals as of 12 July 2022 ‡ National team caps and goals as of 1 February 2017

Ibrahim Salah Abdel Fattah (Arabic: إبراهيم صلاح عبدالفتاح; born on 1 April 1987) is an Egyptian footballer who plays as a midfielder.

== Career ==
Salah left Zamalek SC on 1 July 2013, having played for the club in five years. He plays usually as a defensive midfielder, although he may be converted into a winger when needed. In February 2014, Salah was linked to a move to Sheffield United but rejoined Zamalek in April 2014, ending a one-year spell at the Saudi club Al-Orobah.

Salah scored his first international goal in the friendly against Uganda 3–0 victory on 14 August 2013.

In 2016 he joined Smouha SC on loan scoring 20 goals in 17 appearances.

He has since found goalscoring form for Zamalek scoring 30 in his first season back for the club.

After this clinical return to form many teams were vying for his signature but it was Arab Contractors FC who won the race for his signature. In 2019 he signed a four-year contract extension with the club.

== Honours ==
Zamalek

- Egyptian Premier League: 2014–15
- Egypt Cup: 2016, 2017

=== Individual ===
Awards

- Lebanese Premier League Team of the Year: 2011–12
