= Islam Abou Salima =

Egyptian footballer (born 1993)

Personal information
- Full name: Islam Abou Salima
- Date of birth: 25 June 1993 (age 33) or 1 January 1993 (age 33)
- Place of birth: Damietta, Egypt
- Height: 1.82 m (6 ft 0 in)
- Position: Center-back

Team information
- Current team: Al Masry
- Number: 30

Youth career
- 1998–2007: Ittihad El Shorta

Senior career*
Years	Team	Apps	(Gls)
2007–2013	Ittihad El Shorta Reserves		
2013–2017	Ittihad El Shorta		
2017	→ El Sharkia (loan)		(1)
2017–	Al Masry	11	(4)
- * Club domestic league appearances and goals as of 28 November 2017

Islam Abou Salima (Egyptian Arabic: إسلام أبو سليمة; born 25 June 1993 "or" 1 January 1993) is an Egyptian footballer who plays as a center-back for Al Masry.
