= Sherif Alaa =

Egyptian footballer (born 1992)

Personal information
- Full name: Sherif Alaa
- Date of birth: July 23, 1992 (age 34)
- Place of birth: Egypt
- Height: 1.80 m (5 ft 11 in)
- Position: Left back

Team information
- Current team: El Sharkia

Senior career*
Years	Team	Apps	(Gls)
2013–2015	El Mokawloon	24	(0)
2015–	Zamalek	1	(0)
- * Club domestic league appearances and goals ‡ National team caps and goals as of 4 June 2014

Sherif Alaa (Arabic: شريف علاء) is an Egyptian football player currently playing for Zamalek
