= Attia Al Nashwy =

Egyptian footballer (born 1988)

Personal information
- Full name: Attia Ibrahim El Said Al Nashwy
- Date of birth: March 21, 1988 (age 38)
- Place of birth: Egypt
- Height: 1.78 m (5 ft 10 in)
- Position: Striker

Team information
- Current team: Al Assiouty Sport
- Number: 20

Senior career*
Years	Team	Apps	(Gls)
–2014	Al Masry	?	(?)
2014–	Al Assiouty Sport	38	(12)
- * Club domestic league appearances and goals as of 3 August 2015

Attia Al Nashwy (Egyptian Arabic: عطية النشوي) (born 21 March 1988) is an Egyptian footballer who currently plays as a striker for Egyptian club Al Assiouty Sport.
