= Ahmed Mostafa (footballer, born 1987) =

Egyptian footballer

Ahmed Mostafa "Shamama"
Personal information
- Full name: Ahmed Mostafa Gomaa
- Date of birth: September 8, 1987 (age 39)
- Place of birth: Aswan, Egypt
- Height: 1.70 m (5 ft 7 in)
- Position: Attacking midfielder

Team information
- Current team: Ittihad El-Shorta

Senior career*
Years	Team	Apps	(Gls)
2007–2012	ENPPI Club	25	(1)
2010–2012	→ Wadi Degla (loan)	26	(5)
2012–2014	El Geish		
2014–	Ittihad El-Shorta		

International career^{‡}
- Egypt
- * Club domestic league appearances and goals as of March 16, 2012 ‡ National team caps and goals as of March 16, 2010

Ahmed Mostafa (Arabic: أحمد مصطفى) is an Egyptian football player that currently plays for the Egyptian Second Division side, Ittihad El Shorta.

== Career ==
On 20 June 2010, Wadi Degla, the newly promoted team to the Egyptian Premier League, announced through its official web site the signing of Mostafa. He signed a one-year loan deal. In August 2012, Mostafa joined Tala'ea El-Gaish SC.
