= Abdoulaye Cissé (footballer, born 1983) =

Footballer (born 1983)

Personal information
- Date of birth: 24 December 1983 (age 42)
- Place of birth: Adzopé, Ivory Coast
- Height: 1.79 m (5 ft 10 in)
- Position: Striker

Youth career
- 1999–2001: Grenoble

Senior career*
Years	Team	Apps	(Gls)
2001–2006	Montpellier	104	(18)
2007	Al-Faisaly	9	(5)
2007	→ Al-Khor (loan)	2	(1)
2007–2009	Al-Siliya	38	(24)
2009–2010	Al-Dhafra	8	(2)
2010	Al-Khor	8	(1)
2010–2012	Al-Masry	42	(15)
2012–2013	Zamalek	12	(8)
2013–2014	Al-Ittihad (Tripoli)		
2014–2016	Zamalek	8	(1)
2015	→ Ittihad El Shorta (loan)	22	(3)
2016–2017	Dhofar Club		

International career
2003–2009	Burkina Faso	14	(4)
- * Club domestic league appearances and goals

Abdoulaye Cissé (born 24 December 1983) is a former professional footballer who played as a striker. Born in Ivory Coast, he represented Burkina Faso at international level.

== Club career ==
Cissé was born in Adzopé, Ivory Coast.

He moved to Al-Siliya Sports Club from Al Faisaly, following a loan to Al-Khor Sports Club during the 2006–07 season. He moved to Egyptian League giants Zamalek SC on 15 May 2012, from Al-Masry. He joined Al-Ittihad (Tripoli) in 2013 for one season, and returned to Zamalek in 2014 summer transfer window.

== International career ==
Cissé was born in the Ivory Coast and of Burkinabe descent. He was a member of the Burkina Faso national team at the 2004 African Nations Cup, which finished bottom of its group in the first round of competition, thus failing to secure qualification for the quarter-finals.

== Honours ==
Zamalek

- Egyptian Premier League: 2014–15
