= Hosny Fathy =

Egyptian footballer (born 1989)

Hosny Fathi
Personal information
- Full name: Hosny Fathi Hamed
- Date of birth: March 19, 1989 (age 37)
- Position: Right full back

Team information
- Current team: Misr Lel-Makkasa
- Number: 12

Senior career*
| Years | Team | Apps | (Gls) |
| 2011–2014 | Misr Lel-Makkasa | | |
| 2014 | Telephonat Beni Suef | | |
| 2014–2016 | Misr Lel-Makkasa | | |
| 2016–2017 | Zamalek | 1 | (0) |
| 2017– | Misr Lel-Makkasa | | |
- * Club domestic league appearances and goals as of september 29, 2016

Hosny Fathi Hamed (Arabic: حسني فتحي) (born March 19, 1989) is an Egyptian football manager and former football player. He was a defender for Misr Lel Makkasa SC of Egypt and went on to become its director of football. In 2024, he announced that he would also be returning to the pitch as a player after not having played a match for nearly three seasons.

== Honours ==
=== Club ===
Zamalek

- Egyptian Super Cup: 2016
