= Mostafa Fathi =

Egyptian footballer (born 1994)

Mostafa Fathi مُصْطَفَى فَتْحِيّ
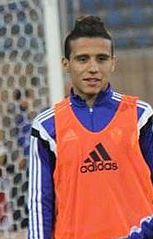
- Mostafa Fathi with Zamalek in 2015

Personal information
- Full name: Mostafa Mohamed Fathi Abdel Hamid Mohamed
- Date of birth: 12 May 1994 (age 32)
- Place of birth: Mansoura, Dakahlia, Egypt
- Height: 1.69 m (5 ft 7 in)
- Position: Winger

Team information
- Current team: Pyramids
- Number: 11

Senior career*
| Years | Team | Apps | (Gls) |
| 2012-2013 | Balqas Club | N&A | (N&A) |
| 2013–2022 | Zamalek | 113 | (18) |
| 2017–2018 | → Al-Taawoun (loan) | 10 | (5) |
| 2020–2021 | → Smouha (loan) | 27 | (17) |
| 2022–2023 | Al Taawoun | 12 | (5) |
| 2022–2023 | → Pyramids (loan) | 32 | (8) |
| 2023– | Pyramids | 18 | (5) |

International career^{‡}
| 2015– | Egypt | 31 | (3) |
- * Club domestic league appearances and goals as of 24 May 2024 ‡ National team caps and goals as of 10 September 2024

Mostafa Mohamed Fathi Abdel Hamid Mohamed (Arabic: مُصْطَفَى مُحَمَّد فَتْحِيّ عَبْد الْحَمِيد مُحَمَّد; born 12 May 1994) is an Egyptian professional footballer who plays as a winger for Egyptian Premier League club Pyramids and the Egypt national team.

== Club career ==
=== Early Career & Rise ===
Fathi Started his career in the Al-Masry SC youth academy before quickly earning promotion to the first team, where he established himself as one of the league's quickest and most technically gifted wingers.

=== Professional Journey ===
Mostafa Fathi began his professional football career during the 2012–13 season after joining Balqas Club. Later joined Zamalek SC, helping the club achieve success in domestic and continental competitions. Fathi attracted significant attention following his impressive performances during the 2014–15 season, contributing to Zamalek's Egyptian League and Egypt Cup double. He was also influential in the club's Egypt Cup triumph the following season, scoring the third goal in a 3–1 victory over rivals Al Ahly. Interest in Fathi from Serie A clubs had emerged previously. In June, Bologna submitted a €400,000 offer for a one-year loan, but Zamalek rejected the proposal, reportedly valuing the winger at no less than €4 million.

In 2017, Al-Taawoun completed the signing of Fathi on a one-year loan deal, reportedly paying a fee of $1.4 million. He returned to Zamalek in 2018 and later spent time on loan at Smouha before rejoining Zamalek. In 2022, he joined Pyramids FC on loan, with the club making the transfer permanent in 2023, becoming an important part of the team's attacking play and regularly contributing to key moments helping the team win trophies and stay on top of the league. Fathi in his peak was known to have speed and dribbling to beat defenders and a key figure in the Egyptian league.

== International career ==
On 2 December 2025, Fathi was called up to the Egypt squad for the 2025 Africa Cup of Nations.

== Career statistics ==
=== Club ===
As of match played 5 June 2025

Appearances and goals by club, season and competition
| Club | Season | League | | | National cup (Note: Includes Egypt Cup, King's Cup) | | Continental | | Other | | Total | |
| Club | Season | Division | Apps | Goals | Apps | Goals | Apps | Goals | Apps | Goals | Apps | Goals |
|---|---|---|---|---|---|---|---|---|---|---|---|---|
| Zamalek | 2013-14 | Egyptian Premier League | 13 | 3 | 4 | 1 | 4 (Note: Appearance(s) in the CAF Champions League) | 1 | – | | 21 | 5 |
| Zamalek | 2014-15 | Egyptian Premier League | 24 | 3 | 4 | 2 | – | | – | | 27 | 5 |
| Zamalek | 2015-16 | Egyptian Premier League | 30 | 5 | 4 | 2 | 9 | 1 | 1 (Note: Appearance(s) in the Egyptian Super Cup) | 0 | 44 | 8 |
| Zamalek | 2016-17 | Egyptian Premier League | 18 | 3 | 1 | 0 | 7 | 1 | 1 | 0 | 27 | 4 |
| Al Taawoun (loan) | 2017-18 | Saudi Pro League | 10 | 5 | 1 | 0 | – | | – | | 11 | 5 |
| Zamalek | 2018-19 | Egyptian Premier League | 7 | 0 | – | | 1 (Note: Appearance(s) in the CAF Confederation Cup) | 0 | – | | 8 | 0 |
| Zamalek | 2019-20 | Egyptian Premier League | 13 | 0 | 3 | 0 | 4 | 0 | – | | 20 | 0 |
| Smouha (loan) | 2020-21 | Egyptian Premier League | 27 | 17 | – | | – | | – | | 27 | 17 |
| Zamalek | 2021-22 | Egyptian Premier League | 8 | 4 | – | | – | | 1 (Note: Appearance(s) in the Egyptian League Cup) | 0 | 9 | 4 |
| Al Taawoun | 2021-22 | Saudi Pro League | 12 | 5 | 1 | 0 | 2 (Note: Appearance(s) in the AFC Champions League) | 0 | – | | 15 | 5 |
| Pyramids | 2022-23 | Egyptian Premier League | 32 | 9 | 4 | 3 | 12 | 4 | 1 | 0 | 49 | 16 |
| Pyramids | 2023-24 | Egyptian Premier League | 29 | 6 | 4 | 1 | 7 | 4 | 3 (Note: Appearances in the Egyptian League Cup and Egyptian Super Cup) | 1 | 43 | 12 |
| Pyramids | 2024-25 | Egyptian Premier League | 20 | 6 | 4 | 1 | 13 | 2 | 3 | 0 | 40 | 9 |
| Career Total | | | 243 | 66 | 30 | 10 | 59 | 13 | 10 | 1 | 342 | 90 |

=== International ===
As of match played 19 November 2024

Appearances and goals by national team and year
| National team | Year | Apps | Goals |
|---|---|---|---|
| Egypt | 2015 | 2 | 0 |
| Egypt | 2016 | 4 | 0 |
| Egypt | 2017 | 1 | 0 |
| Egypt | 2021 | 9 | 0 |
| Egypt | 2023 | 7 | 2 |
| Egypt | 2024 | 10 | 1 |
| Egypt | 2025 | 2 | 0 |
| Total | | 36 | 3 |

Scores and results list Egypt's goal tally first, score column indicates score after each Fathi goal.

List of international goals scored by Mostafa Fathi
| No. | Date | Venue | Cap | Opponent | Score | Result | Competition |
|---|---|---|---|---|---|---|---|
| 1 | 18 June 2023 | Cairo International Stadium, Egypt | 20 | South Sudan | 3–0 | 1–0 | Friendly |
| 2 | 9 August 2023 | 30 June Stadium, Egypt | 21 | Ethiopia | 1–0 | 1–0 | 2023 Africa Cup of Nations qualification |
| 3 | 10 September 2024 | Francistown Stadium, Botswana | 31 | Botswana | 4–0 | 4–0 | 2025 Africa Cup of Nations qualification |

== Honours ==
Zamalek

- Egyptian Premier League: 2014–15, 2021–22
- Egypt Cup: 2012–13, 2013–14, 2014–15, 2015–16, 2018–19
- Egyptian Super Cup: 2016, 2020
- CAF Confederation Cup: 2018–19
- CAF Super Cup: 2020
- Saudi-Egyptian Super Cup: 2018

Pyramids

- Egypt Cup: 2023–24
- CAF Champions League: 2024–25
- CAF Super Cup: 2025
- FIFA African–Asian–Pacific Cup: 2025
