= Basem Morsy =

Egyptian footballer (born 1992)

Bassem Morsy
Personal information
- Full name: Bassem Morsy el-Qotb Abdallah
- Date of birth: 1 January 1992 (age 34)
- Place of birth: Tanta, Gharbia, Egypt
- Height: 1.80 m (5 ft 11 in)
- Position: Forward

Team information
- Current team: Al-Majd
- Number: 9

Youth career
- Othmason Tanta
- –2009: Al Mokawloon
- 2009–2012: Petrojet

Senior career*
Years	Team	Apps	(Gls)
2012–2013	Petrojet	13	(4)
2013–2014	El Entag El Harby	15	(9)
2014–2019	Zamalek	99	(35)
2018	→ AEL (loan)	5	(0)
2019	→ Smouha (loan)	6	(0)
2019–2021	El Entag El Harby	32	(10)
2021	El Makkasa	24	(10)
2021–2022	Ceramica Cleopatra	33	(4)
2022–2024	Ismaily	22	(2)
2023	→ National Bank of Egypt (loan)	13	(0)
2024–2025	Tala'ea El Gaish	5	(0)
2025–	Al-Majd	10	(2)

International career
2014–2016	Egypt	10	(7)
- * Club domestic league appearances and goals

Bassem Morsy el-Qotb Abdallah (Arabic: باسم مرسي القطب عبد الله; born 1 January 1992) is an Egyptian professional footballer who plays as a forward for Al-Majd. And he owns a football academy called "Bassem Morsy Academy".

== Club career ==
=== Petrojet ===
Morsy played with Petrojet for 4 years scoring 4 goals in 13 matches. Petrojet manager then, Mokhtar Mokhtar, ended his contract with Petrojet stating that Basem became more obsessed with his looks than playing football.

=== El Entag El Harby ===
Morsy signed with the military club El Entag El Harby in 2013 where he became the star of the club. Although he scored nine goals in the league, he did not succeed of avoiding relegation to the Egyptian Second Division at the end of the season.

=== Zamalek ===
On 2 July 2014, Morsy signed for Egyptian giants Zamalek from El Entag El Harby. On 25 October 2014, Morsy scored his first goal for Zamalek against Smouha in the Egyptian Premier League. Morsy scored his first hat-trick with Zamalek on 15 July 2015 against Al Nasr. He succeeded in winning the Egyptian Premier League with Zamalek on his first season. He finished the season as the club top goalscorer with 18 goals and second goalscorer in the league after the top goalscorer Hossam Salama. Morsy succeeded in winning Egypt Cup with Zamalek after he scored two goals against Zamalek rival Al Ahly in the final and he repeated it again and scored another two goals against Al Ahly and won the cup again for Zamalek in the next season.

== Career statistics ==
As of 23 June 2023

Club	Season	League	League		Cup		Continental		Other		Total	
Club	Season	League	Apps	Goals	Apps	Goals	Apps	Goals	Apps	Goals	Apps	Goals
Petrojet	2012–13	Egyptian Premier League	13	4	2	0	–	–	–	–	15	4
El Entag El Harby	2012–13	Egyptian Premier League	0	0	1	0	–	–	–	–	1	0
El Entag El Harby	2013–14	Egyptian Premier League	15	9	2	1	–	–	–	–	17	10
El Entag El Harby	Total		15	9	3	1	–	–	–	–	18	10
Zamalek	2014–15	Egyptian Premier League	31	18	5	2	–	–	–	–	36	20
Zamalek	2015–16	Egyptian Premier League	27	7	5	5	11	4	1	0	44	16
Zamalek	2016–17	Egyptian Premier League	24	7	3	1	7	3	1	0	35	11
Zamalek	2017–18	Egyptian Premier League	17	3	4	0	1	0	–	–	22	3
Zamalek	Total		99	35	17	8	19	7	2	0	137	50
AEL (loan)	2018–19	Super League Greece	4	0	1	0	–	–	–	–	5	0
Smouha (loan)	2018–19	Egyptian Premier League	6	0	0	0	–	–	–	–	6	0
El Entag El Harby	2019–20	Egyptian Premier League	24	8	0	0	–	–	–	–	24	8
El Entag El Harby	2020–21	Egyptian Premier League	8	2	0	0	–	–	–	–	8	2
El Entag El Harby	Total		32	10	0	0	–	–	–	–	32	10
El Makkasa	2020–21	Egyptian Premier League	24	10	2	1	–	–	–	–	26	11
Ceramica Cleopatra	2021–22	Egyptian Premier League	33	4	0	0	–	–	3	1	36	5
Ismaily	2022–23	Egyptian Premier League	14	1	0	0	–	–	–	–	14	1
National Bank of Egypt (loan)	2022–23	Egyptian Premier League	12	0	2	0	–	–	–	–	14	0
Career total			252	73	27	10	19	7	5	1	303	91

== International career ==
Morsy has been called up for Egypt for the first time in 2015 for a friendly match against Jamaica. On 4 June 2014, Morsy made his debut against Jamaica as a substitute and managed to score his first international goal to make it 2–2. He celebrated his goal by pointing out to his shirt number 15, and drawing a heart in the air, dedicating the goal to his injured teammate Gedo, who missed the match due to a severe injury, used to celebrate the same way, and used to wear the same shirt.

=== International statistics ===
As of 13 November 2016.

Appearances and goals by national team and year
National team	Year	Apps	Goals
Egypt	2014	1	1
Egypt	2015	5	5
Egypt	2016	4	1
Egypt	2017	0	0
Egypt	2018	0	0
Egypt	2019	0	0
Total		10	7

=== International goals ===
Egypt score listed first, score column indicates score after each Morsy goal.

International goals by date, venue, cap, opponent, score, result and competition
No.	Date	Venue	Cap	Opponent	Score	Result	Competition	Ref
1	4 June 2014	Brisbane Road, London, England	1	Jamaica	2–2	2–2	Friendly	
2	26 March 2015	Petro Sport Stadium, Cairo, Egypt	2	Equatorial Guinea	1–0	2–0	Friendly	
3	14 June 2015	Borg El Arab Stadium, Alexandria, Egypt	3	Tanzania	2–0	3–0	2017 Africa Cup of Nations qualification	
4	6 September 2015	Stade Omnisports Idriss Mahamat Ouya, N'Djamena, Chad	4	Chad	1–0	5–1	2017 Africa Cup of Nations qualification	
5	6 September 2015	Stade Omnisports Idriss Mahamat Ouya, N'Djamena, Chad	4	Chad	2–0	5–1	2017 Africa Cup of Nations qualification	
6	6 September 2015	Stade Omnisports Idriss Mahamat Ouya, N'Djamena, Chad	4	Chad	5–1	5–1	2017 Africa Cup of Nations qualification	
7	29 January 2016	Aswan Stadium, Aswan, Egypt	7	Libya	2–0	2–0	Friendly	

== Honours ==
=== Club ===
Zamalek

- Egyptian Premier League: 2014–15
- Egypt Cup: 2014–15, 2015–16, 2017–18
- Egyptian Super Cup: 2016–17

Individual

- Egypt Cup Top goalscorer: 2015–16
