= Ahmed Samir (footballer, born 1994) =

Egyptian footballer (born 1994)

Personal information
- Full name: Ahmed Samir Mohamed
- Date of birth: 25 August 1994 (age 32)
- Place of birth: Egypt
- Height: 1.83 m (6 ft 0 in)
- Position: Left midfielder

Team information
- Current team: Tala'ea El Gaish
- Number: 19

Youth career
- Zamalek SC

Senior career*
Years	Team	Apps	(Gls)
2011–2014	El Dakhleya	23	(2)
2014–2017	Zamalek SC	22	(1)
2015–2016	→ Ismaily SC (loan)	22	(1)
2016–2017	→ Al-Masry (loan)	6	(1)
2017–2018	Wadi Degla	3	(0)
2018	Ittihad Alexandria	1	(0)
2018–	Tala'ea El Gaish	154	(31)

International career
2012–2013	Egypt U-20	35	(10)
2013–	Egypt	3	(1)
- * Club domestic league appearances and goals as of 12 March 2024

Ahmed Samir Mohamed (Arabic: أحمد سمير محمد, born 25 August 1994) is an Egyptian footballer who plays for Tala'ea El Gaish.

== Club career ==
=== Dakhleya ===
Samir played for El Dakhleya in the Egyptian Premier League and made his debut in 2011 versus Al-Mokawloon Al-Arab.

=== Zamalek ===
Samir signed for Zamalek in 2014 summer transfers. He won the Premier league.

== International career ==
He won the African Youth Championship with Egypt in March 2013, scoring in the final's penalty shoot-out. .

== Honours ==
=== Club ===
Zamalek SC

- Egyptian Premier League (1): 2014–15

Tala'ea El Gaish

- Egyptian Super Cup (1): 2020–21

=== International ===
Egypt U-20

- African Youth Championship (1): 2013
