= Ahmed Samir Farag =

Egyptian footballer (born 1986)

Personal information
- Full name: Ahmed Samir Farag
- Date of birth: 20 May 1986 (age 40)
- Place of birth: Cairo, Egypt
- Height: 1.83 m (6 ft 0 in)
- Positions: Left back; winger

Team information
- Current team: El-Daklyeh

Youth career
- 1997–2003: Al Ahly
- 2003–2005: FC Sochaux-Montbéliard

Senior career*
Years	Team	Apps	(Gls)
2004–2007	FC Sochaux-Montbéliard B	4	(1)
2006–2006	→ Al Ahly (loan)	5	(0)
2007–2012	Al-Ismaily	179	(20)
2012–2014	Lierse	39	(1)
2014–2014	Zamalek SC	5	(1)
2014–2016	Al-Ismaily	44	(1)
2016–2018	El-Daklyeh	0	(0)

International career
2008–2012	Egypt	19	(0)
- * Club domestic league appearances and goals

Ahmed Samir Farag (Arabic: أحمد سمير فرج; born 20 May 1986) is an Egyptian footballer who plays for El-Daklyeh and Egyptian national football team. Farag mainly plays as a left back but can play as a left midfielder and left winger.

In June 2008, Farag was chosen to the Egypt national football team and took a place in the line-up for the five matches Egypt played in 2010 World Cup Qualifiers. He made his debut match against Congo DR on 1 June 2008.

He was included in the Egypt national under-21 football team in two successive world championships, 2005 World Youth Cup held in Netherlands and 2003 World Youth Cup in UAE. After his performance in 2003, Farag signed his first professional contract with FC Sochaux-Montbéliard at the age of 17, transferring from Al Ahly of Egypt. He was nominated for Young Player of the Year in Africa in 2005. In 2011, he won the best player prize in the Nile Basin Tournament, in Egypt. On 27 February 2014, he joined Zamalek SC for 2 1/2 years.

== Honours ==
Zamalek SC

- Egypt Cup (1): 2014
