= Ayman Hefny =

Egyptian footballer (born 1985)

Personal information
- Full name: Ali Hefny Abdullah Hassanein
- Date of birth: 31 December 1985 (age 40)
- Place of birth: Giza, Egypt
- Height: 1.67 m (5 ft 6 in)
- Position: Attacking midfielder

Youth career
- El Badrasheen

Senior career*
Years	Team	Apps	(Gls)
2011–2012	Misr Lel Makkasa	15	(4)
2012–2014	Tala'ea El Gaish	46	(3)
2014–2019	Zamalek	126	(14)
2019–2020	Misr Lel Makkasa	0	(0)
2020	→ Al Mokawloon (loan)	0	(0)
2021–2022	Zamalek	2	(1)

International career
2014	Egypt	4	(0)
- * Club domestic league appearances and goals

Ayman Hefny (Arabic: أيمن حفني; born 31 December 1985) is an Egyptian footballer who plays as an attacking midfielder for the Egypt national team.

== Honours ==
Zamalek

- Egyptian Premier League:(3) 2014–15, 2020-21, 2021-22
- Egypt Cup:(5) 2015, 2016, 2017–18, 2018–19, 2021
- Egyptian Super Cup:(1) 2016
- Saudi-Egyptian Super Cup:(1) 2018
- CAF Confederation Cup:(1) 2018–19
