= Moamen Zakaria =

Egyptian footballer (born 1988)

Personal information
- Full name: Moamen Zakaria Abbas Eldawy
- Date of birth: 12 April 1988 (age 38)
- Place of birth: Sohag, Egypt
- Height: 1.80 m (5 ft 11 in)
- Position: Winger

Youth career
- 2004–2009: Al Ahly

Senior career*
Years	Team	Apps	(Gls)
2009–2010	El Entag El Harby	36	(4)
2011–2012	Al Masry	22	(2)
2012–2014	ENPPI	15	(6)
2013–2014	→ Zamalek (loan)	35	(9)
2015–2018	Al Ahly	93	(30)
2018	→ Al-Ahli (loan)	6	(1)
2019	→ Ohod (loan)	0	(0)
2019	Al Ahly		
Total		207	(52)

International career
2014–2018	Egypt	12	(0)
- * Club domestic league appearances and goals

Moamen Zakaria Abbas Eldawy (Arabic: مُؤْمِن زَكَرِيَّا عَبَّاس الدَّاوِي; born 12 April 1988) is an Egyptian former professional footballer who plays as a winger. In 2020, he was diagnosed with amyotrophic lateral sclerosis.

In May 2022, former international teammate Mo Salah invited Zakaria to be part of Liverpool's celebrations after winning the 2022 FA Cup Final.

== Honours ==
Zamalek

- Egyptian Premier League: 2014–15
- Egypt Cup: 2012–13, 2013–14

Al Ahly

- Egyptian Premier League: 2015–16, 2016–17, 2017–18, 2018–19,
- Egypt Cup: 2016–17
- Egyptian Super Cup: 2015, 2017
