= Hossam Salama =

Egyptian footballer (born 1982)

Personal information
- Full name: Hossam Salama Ibrahim Hassan
- Date of birth: 13 November 1982 (age 43)
- Place of birth: Sanafir, Qalyub, Egypt
- Height: 1.84 m (6 ft 1/2 in)
- Position: Forward

Youth career
- MS Safafir
- MS Aga

Senior career*
Years	Team	Apps	(Gls)
- MS Aga
	MS Toukh		(23)
	→ Menouf (loan)		(6)
	Sokar Abou Qirqas		(20)
2012–2013	El Shams		(10)
2013–2015	El Dakhleya	50	(23)
2015–2016	Smouha	47	(23)
2017–2019	Zamalek	9	(2)
2017	→ Al Ittihad (loan)	15	(1)
2018	→ Al Mokawloon (loan)	10	(2)
2018–2019	→ El Dakhleya (loan)	29	(11)
2019–2020	Tala'ea El Gaish	12	(0)
2020–2021	Tersana		
2021–2022	Pioneers		
2022–2023	El Qanah		

International career
2016	Egypt	1	(0)
2022–	Egypt (beach)	16	(21)
- * Club domestic league appearances and goals

Hossam Salama Ibrahim Hassan (Egyptian Arabic: حسام سلامة إبراهيم حسن; born 13 November 1982), also known as Hossam Paulo (Egyptian Arabic: حسام باولو), or simply Paulo, is a former Egyptian footballer who played as a forward.

== Honours ==
Zamalek

- Egyptian Super Cup: 2016

Individual

- Egyptian Premier League top goalscorer: 2014–15, 2015–16
