= Montakhab El Suez Petrojet SC =

- Full name: Montakhab El Suez Petrojet SC
- Ground: Suez Stadium
- League: Egyptian Premier League

Montakhab El Suez Petrojet SC (Arabic: نادي منتخب السويس بتروجيت) is an Egyptian football club representing Suez Governorate and competing in the Egyptian Premier League. The club was established following an investment and administrative agreement between Suez SC and Petrojet SC to establish a company specializing in the management and investment of football activities.
