= 2014–15 Egyptian Premier League =

Egyptian Premier League
- Season: 2014–15
- Dates: 15 September 2014 – 3 August 2015
- Champions: Zamalek; 12th Premier League title
- Relegated: El Gouna; El Raja; Al Nasr; Al Assiouty Sport; Ala'ab Damanhour
- Champions League: Zamalek; Al Ahly
- Confederation Cup: ENPPI; Misr Lel-Makkasa
- Matches: 380
- Goals: 907 (2.39 per match)
- Top goalscorer: Hossam Salama (20 goals)
- Biggest home win: Tala'ea El Geish 5–0 Al Nasr (15 September 2014); Zamalek 6–1 Tala'ea El Geish (21 September 2014); Al Ahly 5–0 Al Assiouty Sport (14 April 2015)
- Biggest away win: Al Nasr 0–6 ENPPI (27 November 2014)
- Highest scoring: Petrojet 3–6 Misr Lel-Makkasa (2 June 2015)
- Longest winning run: Zamalek (8 matches)
- Longest unbeaten run: Zamalek (18 matches)
- Longest winless run: Al Assiouty Sport (28 matches)
- Longest losing run: Ala'ab Damanhour (11 matches)
- Highest attendance: 20,000 for Zamalek

The 2014–15 Egyptian Premier League was the 56th season of the Egyptian Premier League, the top Egyptian professional league for association football clubs, since its establishment in 1948. The season started on 15 September 2014 and concluded on 3 August 2015.

== Teams ==
A total of 20 teams contested the league, including 17 sides from the 2013–14 season and 3 promoted from the 2013–14 Egyptian Second Division. This includes the promotion play-off winners (Ala'ab Damanhour, Al Assiouty Sport and Al Nasr).

Al Assiouty Sport and Al Nasr made their Premier League debut. Zamalek drew the highest attendance, 20,000 spectators in a match in February.

=== Stadiums and locations ===
Team	Location	Stadium
Ala'ab Damanhour	Damanhour	Ala'ab Damanhour Stadium
Al Ahly	Cairo	Cairo International Stadium
Al Assiouty Sport	Assiut	Al Assiouty Sport Resort Stadium
El Dakhleya	Cairo	30 June Stadium
El Gouna	El Gouna	El Gouna Stadium
Al Masry	Port Said	Ismailia Stadium^{1}
Al Mokawloon	Cairo	Arab Contractors Stadium
Al Nasr	Cairo	Cairo Military Academy Stadium
Al Raja	Mersa Matruh	Haras El Hodoud Stadium
ENPPI	Cairo	Petro Sport Stadium
Haras El Hodoud	Alexandria	Haras El Hodoud Stadium
Al Ittihad	Alexandria	Alexandria Stadium
Ittihad El Shorta	Cairo	Police Academy Stadium
Ismaily	Ismailia	Ismailia Stadium
Misr El Makasa	Fayoum	Fayoum Stadium
Petrojet	Suez	Suez Stadium
Smouha	Alexandria	Alexandria Stadium
Tala'ea El Gaish	Cairo	Cairo Military Academy Stadium
Wadi Degla	Cairo	30 June Stadium
Zamalek	Cairo	Cairo International Stadium

^{1} Al Masry's original stadium is Port Said Stadium, but due to the Port Said Stadium riot the Egyptian Football Association decided that Al Masry would not play their home matches at Port Said Stadium until 2016, and instead they will play at Ismailia Stadium.

== Results ==
=== League table ===
Pos	Team	Pld	W	D	L	GF	GA	GD	Pts	Qualification or relegation
1	Zamalek (C)	38	26	9	3	69	21	+48	87	Qualification for the Champions League
2	Al Ahly	38	23	10	5	65	26	+39	79	Qualification for the Champions League
3	ENPPI	38	18	16	4	65	29	+36	70	Qualification for the Confederation Cup (Note: Since the winners of the 2015 Egypt Cup, Zamalek, qualified for African competition based on league position, the spot awarded to the Cup winner (Confederation Cup) was passed to the fourth-placed team which were the next best teams in the table not already qualified for any African competition.)
4	Misr Lel Makkasa	38	18	10	10	57	51	+6	64	Qualification for the Confederation Cup
5	Wadi Degla	38	14	15	9	46	36	+10	57	
6	Ismaily	38	14	19	5	44	32	+12	55 (Note: Ismaily were deducted 6 points for failing to pay over agent's wages.)	
7	Al Mokawloon	38	15	10	13	47	41	+6	55	
8	Haras El Hodoud	38	12	16	10	30	31	−1	52	
9	Tala'ea El Geish	38	15	7	16	49	56	−7	52	
10	Smouha	38	14	9	15	43	37	+6	51	
11	Al Masry	38	13	11	14	37	41	−4	50	
12	El Dakhleya	38	12	13	13	43	41	+2	49	
13	Petrojet	38	13	10	15	49	53	−4	49	
14	Al Ittihad	38	11	15	12	39	38	+1	48	
15	Ittihad El Shorta	38	10	17	11	36	42	−6	47	
16	El Gouna (R)	38	10	16	12	33	35	−2	46	Relegation to the Second Division
17	El Raja (R)	38	11	10	17	47	57	−10	43	Relegation to the Second Division
18	Al Nasr (R)	38	8	8	22	34	70	−36	29 (Note: Al Nasr were deducted 3 points for refusing to play their away game against Al Mokawloon.)	Relegation to the Second Division
19	Al Assiouty Sport (R)	38	2	10	26	40	88	−48	16	Relegation to the Second Division
20	Ala'ab Damanhour (R)	38	3	5	30	34	82	−48	14	Relegation to the Second Division

Source: Soccerway
Rules for classification: 1) Points; 2) Goal difference; 3) Goals scored.
(C) Champion; (R) Relegated

=== Result table ===
Home \ Away	AHL	DMN	ASS	DKH	ENP	HRS	ISM	ITH	GOU	MAS	MMK	MOK	NAS	PET	ITS	RAJ	SMO	TGS	WDG	ZAM
Al Ahly	—	4–2	5–0	2–0	1–1	3–0	0–0	1–4	1–1	2–0	1–0	0–1	2–1	1–1	3–0	2–1	1–1	4–0	3–1	2–0
Ala'ab Damanhour	1–2	—	2–1	1–2	2–3	1–1	0–2	2–4	1–2	1–2	1–1	1–4	0–2	0–2	0–2	2–0	1–3	0–3	0–1	1–2
Al Assiouty Sport	0–0	1–5	—	2–4	2–4	1–1	1–2	2–2	1–1	1–3	1–2	1–1	1–2	2–3	2–2	3–0	1–1	2–3	2–2	1–3
El Dakhleya	0–1	3–0	1–1	—	0–1	1–2	0–0	2–1	1–0	2–1	1–1	2–0	2–2	0–1	0–0	2–0	1–0	2–2	0–2	0–2
ENPPI	1–0	3–0	4–1	2–2	—	2–4	3–0	0–0	1–0	0–1	0–0	2–2	0–0	1–0	1–1	4–1	2–1	3–0	1–0	2–0
Haras El Hodoud	1–0	1–1	2–1	1–0	0–0	—	2–0	0–1	0–1	0–0	2–2	1–0	0–1	0–0	1–0	2–2	0–2	1–0	0–0	0–2
Ismaily	1–1	2–1	5–1	1–1	0–0	0–0	—	1–1	1–0	1–1	2–2	2–2	1–0	2–1	1–1	3–0	3–1	0–0	2–1	0–0
Al Ittihad	0–1	1–0	3–2	1–0	1–4	1–1	1–1	—	0–0	0–1	0–1	0–0	1–2	4–2	1–1	3–2	0–0	0–0	0–2	0–1
El Gouna	0–2	0–0	1–1	1–2	0–0	0–1	1–2	0–0	—	0–1	2–2	2–1	2–1	2–1	0–1	1–1	1–1	2–1	1–2	1–1
Al Masry	1–1	2–0	2–0	0–0	1–3	1–0	2–2	1–0	0–1	—	1–1	0–1	3–2	0–1	0–1	2–2	0–0	0–0	1–0	0–1
Misr Lel Makkasa	0–2	1–0	3–2	2–1	1–1	0–0	0–2	2–1	0–1	3–2	—	1–1	2–1	4–1	2–1	2–1	0–2	1–6	2–0	2–1
Al Mokawloon	0–1	3–1	4–0	3–2	0–4	0–1	2–0	1–1	0–0	1–0	1–2	—	2–0^{(1)}	3–2	2–1	0–1	0–0	2–0	0–1	0–1
Al Nasr	0–3	3–1	1–0	0–4	0–6	2–2	0–0	2–1	1–1	0–0	0–2	1–3	—	2–3	1–1	1–0	0–2	1–2	1–1	0–4
Petrojet	1–2	3–0	2–1	0–0	1–1	1–2	0–1	0–1	1–1	3–1	3–6	2–1	1–0	—	1–1	0–2	1–0	0–1	1–1	1–1
Ittihad El Shorta	1–3	2–1	1–0	4–1	2–1	0–0	1–1	0–0	1–1	0–0	0–2	1–1	1–0	2–2	—	1–1	1–1	0–1	1–0	0–0
El Raja	2–1	1–0	3–0	0–0	2–2	1–0	1–1	1–1	1–0	2–3	3–2	0–1	4–1	2–2	1–2	—	3–1	0–1	1–1	2–3
Smouha	1–3	5–1	3–0	0–1	1–0	1–0	0–0	0–1	1–1	0–1	0–1	2–1	2–1	2–1	1–0	0–1	—	2–0	3–1	0–1
Tala'ea El Gaish	1–3	3–2	0–1	1–0	0–0	1–1	0–2	0–3	0–3	4–2	2–0	1–2	5–0	0–1	3–1	2–1	3–2	—	0–0	2–3
Wadi Degla	0–0	2–2	3–1	3–3	1–1	0–0	1–0	0–0	1–2	4–1	2–1	1–1	2–1	1–2	1–0	3–1	2–1	3–0	—	0–0
Zamalek	1–1	3–0	2–0	0–0	1–1	2–0	3–0	2–0	2–0	1–0	3–1	3–0	3–1	2–1	5–1	2–0	2–0	6–1	0–0	—

Updated to match(es) played on 3 August 2015. Source: FIFA.com
Legend: Blue = home team win; Yellow = draw; Red = away team win.

Notes:

- ^^{(1)} Round 37 match between Al Mokawloon and Al Nasr was cancelled after Al Nasr's players refused to play the match due to the attack on some Egyptian army personnel in Sinai; the Egyptian Football Association's chairman of the competitions committee said that the match has considered as a 2–0 win for Al Mokawloon.

== Top goalscorers ==
As of 3 August 2015.

Rank	Scorer	Club	Goals (pen.)
1	(Egypt) Hossam Salama	El Dakhleya	20 (3)
2	(Egypt) Basem Morsy	Zamalek	18 (2)
3	(Nigeria) Stanley Ohawuchi	Wadi Degla	15 (1)
4	(Egypt) Moamen Zakaria	Zamalek (7); Al Ahly (7)	14 (1)
5	(Egypt) Wael Farrag	Misr El Makasa	13
6	(Egypt) Attia Al Nashwy	Al Assiouty Sport	12 (1)
6	(Egypt) Arafa El Sayed	Tala'ea El Geish	12 (1)
6	(Egypt) Emad Moteab	Al Ahly	12 (2)
6	(Ghana) John Antwi	Ismaily	12 (2)
6	(Egypt) Mohamed Hamdy	Al Ittihad	12 (2)
6	(Egypt) Mohamed El Gabbas	Wadi Degla	12 (3)
