= Ittihad El Shorta SC =

Association football club in Cairo, Egypt

Ittihad El Shorta
- Full name: Ittihad El Shorta
- Founded: 1980; 46 years ago
- Ground: Police Academy Stadium
- Capacity: 12,000
- Manager: Abdel Rahim Mohamed
- League: Egyptian Third Division
- 2017–18: Second Division, 13th (Group B) (Relegated)
Home colours	Away colours

Ittihad El Shorta (Arabic: نادي إتحاد الشرطة), also known as Police Union, or simply El Shorta, is an Egyptian football club based in the Egyptian capital Cairo. The club was founded in 1980 and competes in Egyptian Third Division, the third-highest league in the Egyptian football league system.

== Current squad ==
Note: Flags indicate national team as defined under FIFA eligibility rules; some limited exceptions apply. Players may hold more than one non-FIFA nationality.

No.	Pos.	Nation	Player
1	GK	EGY	Essam Saad
3	MF	EGY	Hossam Abdel-Aal
4	DF	EGY	Thiago
5	DF	EGY	Khaled Sotohi
6	DF	EGY	Ahmed Gamal
7	MF	EGY	Omar Kamal Abdelwahed
8	FW	GHA	Samuel Owusu
9	FW	EGY	Mahmoud Ibrahim
11	MF	EGY	Mohamed Bassiouny
14	MF	EGY	Ahmed Kamal
14	MF	EGY	Ahmed Mostafa Shamama
15	FW	EGY	Ahmed Saad
16	GK	EGY	Amr Hossam
17	MF	EGY	Khaled El-Ghandour
18	MF	EGY	Mohamed Adel
19	DF	EGY	Islam Abou Salima
20	MF	EGY	Mohamed Abdelsalam

No.	Pos.	Nation	Player
21	DF	EGY	Ahmed Adel
22	MF	EGY	Mostafa Kahraba
23	MF	EGY	Mohamed Said
24	MF	CIV	Yaya Traoré
25	MF	BFA	Abdoulaye Cissé
28	DF	EGY	Ahmed Abdelrasoul
-	DF	EGY	Ahmed Abdelghani
-	DF	EGY	Ahmed Abdelghani
—	MF	EGY	Hossam Galal
—	MF	EGY	Amr Mahdy
—	MF	EGY	Amr Mahdy
—	MF	EGY	Fathi Abdelghalil
—	MF	EGY	Mohamed Lofti
—	MF	EGY	Mahmoud Sami
—	FW	EGY	Osama Osman
—	FW	EGY	Ibrahim El Helali

== Managers ==
- (Egypt) Talaat Youssef (July 1, 2008 – July 11, 2011)
- (Egypt) Helmy Toulan (July 21, 2011 – June 20, 2012)
- (Egypt) Mohamed Helmy (June 25, 2012 – July 24, 2013)
- (Egypt) Khaled El-Kammash
