= 2009–10 Al Ahly SC season =

Al-Ahly
2009–10 season
- Chairman: Hassan Hamdy
- Manager: Hossam El-Badry
- Egyptian Premier League: 1st
- Egypt Cup 2010: Round of 16
- Egyptian Super Cup 2009: Runners-up
- CAF Champions League: Semi-finals
Home colors colours	Away colors colours	Home colors (alt) colours

The 2009–10 Al Ahly SC season was the 53rd edition in the Egyptian Premier League. Al-Ahly was looking to defend their fifth title in a row.

== Pre-season games ==
Al-Ahly announced that the six fixtures of their 2009 pre-season would be in Germany and England. On July 3, 2009, Al-Ahly played their first pre-season match in Gelsenkirchen, Germany against FC Gelsenkirchen. Later that day, Al-Ahly also played their first match of the Zayton Cup against the Turkish team Galatasaray, and 3 days later they played the German Bayer 04 Leverkusen. The last match was on July 11 against the Moroccan team Wydad Casablanca. After their match against Haras El Hodood in the Egyptian Super Cup, Al-Ahly's 23 players went to London to play in the Wembley Cup against Celtic and Barcelona on 24th and 26 July.

Date	Opponents	H / A	Result F - A	Scorers
3 July 2009	FC Gelsenkirchen	A Gelsenkirchen	5 - 0	3 Ahmed 'Manga' Nabil, Hany El-Agazy, Osama Hosny
5 July 2009	Galatasaray	A LTU Arena	0 - 1	Barış Özbek (P) 33'
24 July 2009	Bayer 04 Leverkusen	A LTU Arena	0 - 2	Burak Kaplan 3', Tranquillo Barnetta 90'
11 July 2009	Wydad Casablanca	A LTU Arena	2 - 0	Mostafa Shebeita (P) 40', Mohamed Samir (P) 52'
24 July 2009	Celtic	A Wembley	0 - 5	Massimo Donati 31', Scott McDonald 2 38'(P) 59', Shaun Maloney 49', Chris Killen 83'
26 July 2009	Barcelona	A Wembley	1 - 4	Bojan Krkic 16', Hany El-Agazy 31', José Manuel Rueda 41', Jeffrén Suárez 56', Pedro 67'

== Egyptian Super Cup ==
As the Egyptian Premier League 2008–09 champions, Al-Ahly kicked off the 2009–10 season with the traditional match in the Egyptian Super Cup against 2009 Egypt Cup champion Haras El Hodood on July 21.

Date	Opponents	H / A	Result F – A	Scorers
21 July 2009	Haras El Hodood	N	0 - 2	Ahmed Hassan Mekky 5', Ahmed Abdel-Ghani 85'

== Egyptian Premier League ==
Al-Ahly's opening game of the Egyptian Premier League 2009–10 was on August 6 against Ghazl El-Mehalla. Al-Ahly's coach Hossam El-Badry, who took over the club following the departure of Portuguese Manuel José at the end of the previous season, employed an unusual 4-4-2 formation. Despite the bad opening of the season in the super cup defeat against Haras El Hodood Al-Ahly beat Ghazl El-Mehalla 2–0. Ahmed Hassan made the opening score after 40 minutes and Francis Doe brought the score up to two 66 minutes into his Egyptian Premier League debut. The next game was a narrow 2–1 win over Ittihad El-Shorta in an unbroadcast game on 19 August. Former Ahly player Ahmed Galal scored the first goal of the game after 31 minutes, but 4 minutes later Ahly's player Ahmed Hassan scored equalizing the score. In the second-half substitute Hussein Yasser scored Al-Ahly's second goal in the 80th minute to secure Ahly's second win of the season.

On 23 August, Al-Ahly played their third match of the season against Haras El Hodood in a 1–1 draw, Haras El Hodood player Ahmed Salama scored the opener 69 minutes in and Ahmed Hassan scored the equalizer nine minutes later.

Date	Opponents	H / A	Result F – A	Scorers	League position
6 August 2009	Ghazl El-Mehalla	H	2 - 0	Ahmed Hassan 40', Francis Doe 60'	2nd
19 August 2009	Ittihad El-Shorta	A	1 - 2	Ahmed Galal 31', Ahmed Hassan 34', Hussein Yasser 80'	2nd
23 August 2009	Haras El Hodood	H	1 - 1	Ahmed Salama 69', Ahmed Hassan 78'	2nd

Pos	Team	Pld	W	D	L	GF	GA	GD	Pts	Qualification or relegation
1	Al Ahly (C)	30	18	11	1	47	23	+24	65	2011 CAF Champions League
2	Zamalek	30	16	7	7	43	26	+17	55	2011 CAF Champions League
3	Ismaily	30	11	15	4	34	25	+9	48	2011 CAF Confederation Cup
4	Petrojet	30	13	8	9	42	37	+5	47 (Note: Petrojet and Police Union are ranked based on the results of the two matches played between them.)	
5	Police Union	30	12	11	7	35	24	+11	47	

Source: FIFA.com
(C) Champions

== CAF Champions League ==
=== Group stage ===
Group B
Team	Pld	W	D	L	GF	GA	GD	Pts
(Algeria) JS Kabylie	6	4	2	0	6	2	+4	14
(Egypt) Al-Ahly	6	2	2	2	8	9	−1	8
(Egypt) Ismaily	6	2	0	4	7	8	−1	6
(Nigeria) Heartland	6	1	2	3	5	7	−2	5

18 July 2010
15:00 UTC+1

Heartland (Nigeria)	1 – 1	(Egypt) Al-Ahly
Bello Musa Kofarmata 49'		Mohamed Aboutrika 75' (pen.)

Dan Anyiam Stadium, Owerri
Referee: Badara Diatta (Senegal)

1 August 2010
20:30 UTC+3

Al-Ahly (Egypt)	2 – 1	(Egypt) Ismaily
Mohamed Talaat 58'; Wael Gomaa 90+3'		Mohamed Abougrisha 80'

Cairo Stadium, Cairo
Referee: Koman Coulibaly (Mali)

15 August 2010
22:00 UTC+1

JS Kabylie (Algeria)	1 – 0	(Egypt) Al-Ahly
Mohamed Khoutir-Ziti 25'

Stade 1er Novembre, Tizi Ouzou
Referee: Kokou Djaoupe (Togo)

29 August 2010
21:30 UTC+2

Al-Ahly (Egypt)	1 – 1	(Algeria) JS Kabylie
Gedo 22'		Saad Tedjar 29'

Cairo Stadium, Cairo
Referee: Kaoma Wellington (Zambia)

12 September 2010
20:00 UTC+3

Al-Ahly (Egypt)	2 – 1	(Nigeria) Heartland
Ahmed Fathy 20'; Mohamed Fadl 48'		Emmanuel Nwachi 56'

Cairo Stadium, Cairo
Referee: Amanuel Ayob Russom (Eritrea)

19 September 2010
18:00 UTC+3

Ismaily (Egypt)	4 – 2	(Egypt) Al-Ahly
Abdallah El-Shahat 5'; Ahmed Ali 36', 74'; Moatasem Salem 70'		Mohamed Barakat 35'; Mohamed Talaat 87'

Ismailia Stadium, Ismailia
Referee: Jerome Damon (South Africa)

=== Semi-finals ===
3 October 2010
19:30 UTC+2

Al-Ahly (Egypt)	2 – 1	(Tunisia) Espérance ST
Ashour (yellow card) 34'; Fadl 38'; Shehab El Din (yellow card) 52'; Fathy 68'		Ayman Bin Amor (yellow card) 36'; Hechri (yellow card) 71'; Darragi 72'

Cairo Stadium, Cairo
Referee: El Raay Adel (Libya)

17 October 2010
19:30 UTC+1

Espérance ST (Tunisia)	1 – 0	(Egypt) Al-Ahly
Eneramo 1'; Traoui (yellow card) 63'; Darragi (yellow card) 75'		Ashour (yellow card) 11'; Sherif Abdel-Fadil (yellow card) 28'; Barakat (red card) 30'; Gomaa (yellow card) 34'; Ghaly (yellow card) 52'

Stade 7 November, Rades
Referee: Joseph Lamptey (Ghana)

Ahly 2–2 Espérance on aggregate. Espérance won on away goals rule and advances to the 2010 CAF Champions League final.

== 2009–2010 Squad ==
As September 12, 2009. Note: Flags indicate national team as defined under FIFA eligibility rules; some limited exceptions apply. Players may hold more than one non-FIFA nationality.

No.	Pos.	Nation	Player
1	GK	EGY	Amir Abdelhamid
2	DF	EGY	Mohamed Samir
3	MF	EGY	Wael Shafik
4	DF	EGY	Ateya El-Belqasy
5	DF	EGY	Ahmad El-Sayed
6	DF	EGY	Sherif Abdel-Fadil
7	FW	EGY	Mohamed Fadl
8	MF	EGY	Mohamed Barakat
9	FW	EGY	Emad Moteab
10	FW	EGY	Ahmed Belal (Captain)
12	MF	ANG	Gilberto
14	DF	EGY	Sayed Moawad
15	DF	EGY	Ahmed Ali
16	FW	EGY	Mohamed Talaat
17	MF	EGY	Ahmed Hassan
18	FW	EGY	Osama Hosny (Vice-captain)

No.	Pos.	Nation	Player
19	DF	EGY	Abdullah Farouk
20	DF	EGY	Mohamed Khalaf
21	GK	PLE	Ramzi Saleh
22	MF	EGY	Mohamed Aboutrika
23	MF	EGY	Mostafa Shebeita
24	MF	EGY	Ahmed Fathy
25	MF	EGY	Hossam Ashour
26	DF	EGY	Wael Gomaa
27	MF	EGY	Moataz Eno
28	GK	EGY	Ahmed Adel Abd El-Moneam
29	FW	LBR	Francis Doe
30	FW	EGY	Hany El-Agazy
31	MF	ALG	Amir Sayoud
—	MF	EGY	Alaa Shaaban

== Transfers ==
- Players in / out

=== In ===
Date	Pos.	Name	From	Fee / Note
13 May 2009	DF	(Egypt) Mohamed Khalaf	(Egypt) Al-Nasr Cairo	
15 May 2009	DF	(Egypt) Wael Shafik	(Egypt) Semouha	
22 May 2009	DF	(Egypt) Ateya El-Belqasy	(Egypt) Olympi	Undisclosed
31 May 2009	FW	(Egypt) Mohamed Fadl	(Egypt) Ismaily	Free agent
23 June 2009	MF	(Algeria) Amir Saayoud	(United Arab Emirates) Al-Ahli Dubai	Undisclosed
25 June 2009	MF	(Egypt) Alaa Shaaban	(Egypt) El Hammam	Undisclosed
1 July 2009	FW	(Egypt) Emad Moteab	(Saudi Arabia) Al-Ittihad	Loan return
14 July 2009	FW	(Liberia) Francis Doe	(United States) D.C. United	Undisclosed
31 July 2009	DF	(Egypt) Sherif Abdel-Fadil	(Egypt) Ismaily	€0.2m + Ahmad Sedik
1 January 2010	GK	(Egypt) Sherif Ekramy	(Egypt) El Gouna	

=== Out ===
Date	Pos.	Name	To	Fee / Note
25 May 2009	DF	(Egypt) Abdel Hamid Ahmed	(Egypt) El Gouna	Loan return
1 June 2009	FW	(Angola) Flávio Amado	(Saudi Arabia) Al-Shabab	€2.75m
4 June 2009	DF	(Egypt) Emad El-Nahhas		Retired
4 June 2009	DF	(Egypt) Shady Mohamed	(Egypt) Ittihad	Free agent
16 June 2009	DF	(Egypt) Ramy Adel	(Egypt) El Gouna	Undisclosed
16 June 2009	FW	(Egypt) Ahmed Hassan Farag	(Egypt) El-Shorta	€0.25m
24 June 2009	MF	(Egypt) Hassan Mostafa	(Egypt) Zamalek	Free agent
25 June 2009	MF	(Egypt) Hussein Ali	(Egypt) El Gouna	€0.25m
31 July 2009	MF	(Egypt) Ahmad Sedik	(Egypt) Ismaily	In Sherif Abdel-Fadil deal
27 January 2010	MF	(Qatar) Hussein Yasser	(Egypt) Zamalek	Free agent

== See also ==
- Al-Ahly
