= 2009–10 Egypt Cup =

Tournament details
- Country: Egypt

Final positions
- Champions: Haras El Hodood
- Runners-up: Al-Ahly

Tournament statistics
- Top goal scorer: (Egypt) Mohamed Fadl (5)

The 2009–10 Egypt Cup is the seventy-ninth season of the Egypt Cup since its establishment in 1921. A total of 48 teams are contesting for the Cup.

== Round of 32 ==
The sixteen 2009–10 Premier League teams entered the competition in this round, where they were joined by 16 winners from the preliminary round.

21 May 2010	Tanta FC	2–2 (a.e.t.) (4–1 p)	El Mansoura	Tanta Stadium
16:00	Ali Eid 16'; Ahmed Abdel Hakam 111'	(Report)	Youssef Hamdy 86' (pen.) 115'

21 May 2010	Senbellaween FC	0–1	Haras El Hodood	El Mansoura Stadium
17:00		(Report)	Ahmed Abdel-Ghani 45' (pen.)

21 May 2010	Ismaily	3–0	Aluminim	Ismailia Stadium
19:00	Ahmed Samir Farag 38'; Ahmed Ali 57'; Mohab Said 88'	(Report)

21 May 2010	Al-Mokawloon Al-Arab	2–0	Masr El-Maqasa	Arab Contractors Stadium
19:00	Basem Ali; Mohamed Samara 84'	(Report)

21 May 2010	Al Masri	2–0	Telephonaat Bani Suweif FC	Port Said Stadium
19:00	Ahmed Sherwyda 7' 82'	(Report)

21 May 2010	Al-Ittihad	1–0 (a.e.t)	Al Tersana	Alexandria Stadium
19:00	Abdelhamid Hassan 117'	(Report)

21 May 2010	Al Nasr	1–2	El-Entag El-Harby	Al Nasr Stadium
19:00		(Report)

21 May 2010	Al Ragaa	0–0 (a.e.t.) (5–3 p)	Ittihad El-Shorta	Harras El-Hedoud Stadium
19:00		(Report)

22 May 2010	Al Qanah	0–3	Petrojet	Qanah Stadium
16:00		(Report)

22 May 2010	Al-Rebat We Al-Anwar	2–2 (a.e.t.) (4–3 p)	Ghazl El Mahalla	Al-Rebat We Al-Anwar Stadium
16:00	Amr El Fayoumy; Ibrahim Khaleel	(Report)	Karim Adel Abdel Fatah; Ahmed Hassan 'Drogba'

22 May 2010	Asyut Petroleum	5–3	Koroum	Asiut University Stadium
16:00		(Report)

22 May 2010	Al-Nasr Taadin	0–2	Talaee El Geish	Aswan Stadium
16:00		(Report)

22 May 2010	Al Dakhleya	2–2 (a.e.t.) (El Gouna on p)	El Gouna	Sekka El Hadeed Stadium
17:00		(Report)

22 May 2010	Fayoum	0–1	Zamalek	Fayoum Stadium
17:00		(Report)	Ahmed Gaafar 68'

22 May 2010	Etihaad Nabarouh	0–3	Al-Ahly	Nabarooh Stadium
19:00		(Report)	Mohamed Fadl 30' 53'; Ahmed Shokry 74'

22 May 2010	Gasco	0–1	Enppi	Suez Stadium
19:00		(Report)	Ahmed Al-Muhammadi 11'

== Round of 16 ==
25 May 2010	Al Masri	2–3	Al-Mokawloon Al-Arab	Port Said Stadium
18:00	Shedid Qinawi 45+2'; Mohamed Khalifa 81'	(Report)	Ihab El-Masry 4'; Samara 39'; Reda El-Weshi 90+1' (pen.)

25 May 2010	Al-Ittihad	6–1	Tanta	Alexandria Stadium
18:00	Gedo 7' 48' 51'; Mahmoud Samir 58' 71'; Mahmoud Shaker Abdel Fatah 74'	(Report)	Mahmoud Khafaga 80'

25 May 2010	Al-Ragaa	1–2	Haras El Hodood	El Maxs Stadium
18:00	Abdel Rahman Mosaad 70'	(Report)	Abdel Malek 54'; Ahmed Hassan Mekky 64'

25 May 2010	Ismaily	4–0	El Geish	Ismailia Stadium
21:00	Ahmed Ali 23'; Ahmed Samir Farag 30'; Mohab Said 58'; Abdallah El-Shahat 71'	(Report)

25 May 2010	Enppi	5–0	Asyut Petroleum	Petro Sport Stadium
21:00	Islam Awad 2'; Ahmed Abd El-Zaher 5' 49'; Zeka Goore 10'; Ahmed Raouf 58'	(Report)

26 May 2010	Al-Rebat We Al-Anwar	0–2	Petrojet	Al Rebat We Al Anwar Stadium
16:00		(Report)	Cofie Bekoe 6'; Alaa El-Ghoul 57' (o.g.)

26 May 2010	El-Entag El-Harby	2–2 (a.e.t) (4–2 p)	El Gouna	Al-Salam Stadium
18:00	Abou Kone 76'; Hazem Fathi 92'	(Report)	Gamal Hamza 44'; Ramy Adel 117'

26 May 2010	Zamalek	1–3	Al-Ahly	Cairo International Stadium
21:00	Yasser 1'	(Report)	Abdel-Fadil 17'; Fadl 38'; Aboutrika 52'	Referee: Nicola Rizzoli (Italy)

== Quarterfinals ==
29 May 2010
18:00

Haras El Hodood	3–1	Al-Mokawloon Al-Arab
Abdel Malek 22', 52'; Abdel-Ghani 90+2' (pen.)	(Report)	El-Sayed 76'

El Maxs Stadium

29 May 2010
21:00

Ismaily	1–1 (a.e.t.)	Al-Ittihad
El Shahat 25'	(Report)	Gedo 23'
Penalties
Homos (penalty scored); Sukaj (penalty scored); Al-Sulaya (penalty scored); El-Gamal (penalty scored); El-Hadary (penalty scored)	5–3	(penalty scored) M. Ibrahim; (penalty scored) El-Shayeb; (penalty missed) Shaker; (penalty scored) Farid

Ismailia Stadium

30 May 2010
18:00

El-Entag El-Harby	2–1 (a.e.t.)	Enppi
Aydarous 98'; Mousa 108'	(Report)	Die Foneye 103'

Cairo Military Academy Stadium

30 May 2010
21:00

Al-Ahly	1–0	Petrojet
Abou treika 68'	(Report)

Cairo Stadium

== Semifinals ==
3 June 2010
18:00

Haras El Hodood	2–1 (a.e.t)	Ismaily
El-Shater 31'; Hamed 113'		Selliti 33'

El Maxs Stadium

3 June 2010
21:00

Al-Ahly	2–1	El-Entag El-Harby
Fadl 27', 41'	(Report)	Aidarous 15'

Cairo Stadium

== Final ==
7 June 2010
20:30

Al-Ahly	1–1 (a.e.t)	Haras El Hodood
Barakat 82'	(Report)	Safy 45'
Penalties
Aboutreika (penalty scored); Barakat (penalty scored); Fadl (penalty missed); Gomaa (penalty scored); Hassan (penalty scored)	4–5	(penalty scored) Abdel-Ghani; (penalty scored) Mekky; (penalty scored) Abdel Malek; (penalty scored) Ramadan; (penalty scored) Farouk

Cairo Stadium

== Scorers ==
5 goals

- (Egypt) Mohamed Fadl (Al-Ahly)

4 goals

- (Egypt) Gedo (Ittihad)

3 goals

- (Egypt) Abdel Malek(Haras El Hodood)

2 goals

- (Egypt) Mohamed Aboutreika (Al-Ahly)
- (Egypt) Mohab Said (Ismaily)
- (Egypt) Ahmed Ali (Ismaily)
- (Egypt) Abdallah El-Shahat (Ismaily)
- (Egypt) Ahmed Samir Farag (Ismaily)
- (Egypt) Ahmed Abdel-Ghani (Haras El Hodood)
- (Egypt) Sameh Adrous (El-Entag El-Harby)
- (Egypt) Ahmed Abdel-Zaher (El-Entag El-Harby)
- (Togo) Mickaël Dogbé (El Geish)
- (Egypt) Mahmoud Samir (Ittihad)
- (Egypt) Mohammed Samara (Al-Mokawloon Al-Arab)
- (Egypt) Gamal Hamza (El Gouna)
- (Egypt) Ahmed Sherwyda (El-Masry)

1 goal

- (Egypt) Ahmed Shoukry (Al-Ahly)
- (Egypt) Sherif Abdel-Fadil (Al-Ahly)
- (Egypt) Mohamed Barakat (Al-Ahly)
- (Qatar) Hussein Yasser (Zamalek)
- (Egypt) Ahmed Gaafar (Zamalek)
- (Tunisia) Mohamed Selliti (Ismaily)
- (Ghana) Cofie Bekoe (Petrojet)

1 goal cont.

- (Egypt) Islam El-Shater (Haras El Hodood)
- (Egypt) Mohamed Hamed (Haras El Hodood)
- (Egypt) Mekky (Haras El Hodood)
- (Egypt) Ahmed Salem Safi (Haras El Hodood)
- (Egypt) Hassan Mousa (El-Entag El-Harby)
- (Egypt) Hazem Fathi (El-Entag El-Harby)
- (Egypt) Ahmed Al-Muhammadi (ENPPI)
- (Egypt) Islam Awad (ENPPI)
- (Ivory Coast) Zeka Goore (ENPPI)
- (Egypt) Ahmed Raouf (ENPPI)
- (Ivory Coast) Vincent Die Foneye (ENPPI)
- (Egypt) Abdelhamid Hassan (Ittihad)
- (Egypt) Mahmoud Shaker Abdel Fatah (Ittihad)
- (Egypt) Basem Ali (Al-Mokawloon Al-Arab)
- (Egypt) Ihab El-Masry (Al-Mokawloon Al-Arab)
- (Egypt) Reda El-Weshi (Al-Mokawloon Al-Arab)
- (Egypt) Hamada El Sayed (Al-Mokawloon Al-Arab)
- (Egypt) Ramy Adel (Gouna)
- (Egypt) Ahmad Shedid Qinawi (El-Masry)
- (Egypt) Mohamed Khalifa (El-Masry)
- (Egypt) Karim Adel Abdel Fatah (Ghazl El-Mehalla)
- (Egypt) Ahmed Hassan Drogba (Ghazl El-Mehalla)
- (Egypt) Mahmoud Khafaga (Tanta)
- (Egypt) Amr Al-Fayoumi (Al-Rebat We Al-Anwar)
- (Egypt) Ibrahim Khalil (Al-Rebat We Al-Anwar)

Own goals

- (Egypt) Alaa El-Ghoul (Al-Rebat We Al-Anwar for Petrojet)

== References & External Links ==
- Egypt Cup on FilGoal.com.
- Fixtures of Egypt Cup on GoalZZZ.com, but times are inaccurate.
