= 2015–16 Al Masry SC season =

2015–16 season
- Chairman: Samir Halabia
- Manager: Hossam Hassan
- 2015-16 Egyptian League: 4th
- 2016 Egypt Cup: Round 8
Home colours	Away colours

== Squad information ==
=== Current squad ===
No.	Name	Nationality	Position(s)	Date of birth (age)
Goalkeepers
16	Ramzi Saleh	(Palestine Liberation Organization)	GK	August 1, 1980 (age 36)
22	Mohamed Fathi	(Egypt)	GK	January 1, 1991 (age 25)
31	Ahmed Abdelfattah	(Egypt)	GK	August 22, 1996 (age 20)
32	Abdelrahman Samy	(Egypt)	GK	April 4, 1996 (age 20)
Defenders
2	Akakpo Wilson	(Ghana)	CB	10 October 1992 (age 24)
3	Mohamed Magdy	(Egypt)	CB	27 August 1993 (age 23)
5	Islam Salah	(Egypt)	CB	7 January 1991 (age 25)
7	Osama Azab (captain)	(Egypt)	RB / CB	27 August 1986 (age 30)
13	Tareq Khattab	(Jordan)	CB	May 6, 1992 (age 24)
24	Abdallah Gomaa	(Egypt)	RB	26 February 1993 (age 23)
25	Ahmed Ayman Mansour	(Egypt)	LB	April 13, 1994 (age 22)
29	Mostafa Ali	(Egypt)	CB	October 7, 1995 (age 21)
Midfielders
4	Ahmed Moussa Caporia	(Egypt)	AM	17 January 1988 (age 28)
6	Mohamed Refaay Waeh	(Egypt)	CM / DM	August 16, 1990 (age 26)
8	Amr Moussa	(Egypt)	DM	November 17, 1988 (age 28)
11	Said Mourad	(Egypt)	LM	1 August 1983 (age 33)
12	Mohamed Mosaad	(Egypt)	AM / RM	February 20, 1989 (age 27)
14	Said Mohamed Otta	(Egypt)	RM / MF	January 2, 1985 (age 31)
18	Ahmed Youssef	(Egypt)	LM	February 27, 1991 (age 25)
19	Tarek El Agamy	(Egypt)	LM / MF	February 22, 1995 (age 21)
20	Ahmed El Agouz	(Egypt)	DM	May 27, 1993 (age 23)
21	Moussa Dao	(Burkina Faso)	DM	August 26, 1992 (age 24)
23	Sayed Abdelaal (Vice-captain)	(Egypt)	DM	May 9, 1986 (age 30)
28	Mohamed Osama	(Egypt)	DM / FW	July 1, 1995 (age 21)
30	Mohab Said	(Egypt)	RM / MF / LM	August 11, 1987 (age 29)
33	Soliman Shaaban	(Egypt)	DM	April 27, 1996 (age 20)
40	Mahmoud Ghazaly	(Egypt)	CM / RM	August 27, 1996 (age 20)
Forwards
9	Mohamed Ashraf	(Egypt)	FW / RM	December 14, 1993 (age 23)
10	Ahmed Yasser	(Egypt)	FW / RM	November 27, 1991 (age 24)
15	Ahmed Gomaa	(Egypt)	ST FW / RM	16 January 1988 (age 28)
17	Ahmed Raouf	(Egypt)	SS / ST	15 September 1982 (age 34)

=== Out on loan ===
Note: Flags indicate national team as defined under FIFA eligibility rules; some limited exceptions apply. Players may hold more than one non-FIFA nationality.

No.	Pos.	Nation	Player
—	CB	EGY	Mohamed Gabr (on loan to Haras El-Hodood until 30/06/2016)
—	FW	EGY	Hamada Yehia (on loan to Aswan SC until 30/06/2016)

== 2015–16 Egyptian Premier League ==
=== Position ===
Pos	Team	Pld	W	D	L	GF	GA	GD	Pts	Qualification or relegation
3	Smouha	34	13	16	5	45	37	+8	55 (Note: Smouha ahead of Al Masry on head-to-head record; Smouha–Al Masry 1–0, Al Masry–Smouha 1–1.)	Qualification for the Confederation Cup (Note: Since the winners of the 2015–16 Egypt Cup, Zamalek, qualified for African competition based on league position, the spot awarded to the Cup winner (Confederation Cup) was passed to the fourth-placed team which were the next best teams in the table not already qualified for any African competition.)
4	Al Masry	34	13	16	5	50	37	+13	55	Qualification for the Confederation Cup
5	Wadi Degla	34	14	12	8	38	31	+7	54	

Source: Soccerway
Rules for classification: 1) Points; 2) Head-to-Head points; 3) Head-to-Head goal difference; 4) Head-to-Head goal scored; 5) Head-to-Head away goal scored; 6) Goal difference; 7) Goal scored.

=== Results by round ===
Round	1	2	3	4	5	6	7	8	9	10	11	12	13	14	15	16	17	18	19	20	21	22	23	24	25	26	27	28	29	30	31	32	33	34
Ground	A	H	A	H	H	A	H	A	H	A	H	A	H	A	H	A	H	H	A	H	A	A	H	A	H	A	H	A	H	A	H	A	H	A
Result	W	D	L	W	W	D	D	W	W	D	W	D	W	D	L	D	W	D	D	W	W	L	L	W	D	D	D	L	W	D	W	D	D	D
Position	1	4	7	7	4	3	3	3	3	3	3	3	2	4	4	4	4	4	4	3	3	3	3	3	5	5	6	6	4	5	3	3	3	4

Updated to match(es) played on 15 July 2016. Source:
A = Away; H = Home; W = Win; D = Draw; L = Loss

=== Result table ===
Home \ Away	AHL	ASW	DKH	ENT	ENP	GMH	HRS	ISM	ITH	ITS	MAS	MMK	MOK	PET	SMO	TGS	WDG	ZAM
Al Ahly	—										3–2							
Aswan		—									1–1							
El Dakhleya			—								1–1							
El Entag El Harby				—							0–0							
ENPPI					—						1–2							
Ghazl El Mahalla						—					2–2							
Haras El Hodoud							—				1–3							
Ismaily								—			1–1							
Al Ittihad									—		1–1							
Ittihad El Shorta										—	1–0							
Al Masry	2–2	3–2	3–2	0–0	4–0	1–0	3–2	1–0	2–0	1–0	—	1–1	3–2	0–0	0–1	0–0	0–0	0–1
Misr Lel Makkasa											2–2	—						
Al Mokawloon											1–2		—					
Petrojet											3–1			—				
Smouha											1–1				—			
Tala'ea El Gaish											3–3					—		
Wadi Degla											2–0						—	
Zamalek											2–2							—

Legend: Blue = home team win; Yellow = draw; Red = away team win.

=== Match details ===
22 October 2015 1	Petrojet	1-3	Al Masry	Ismailia Stadium, Ismailia
17:00 UTC+02:00	Gaafar 57'		Raouf 59'; Gomaa 81'; Abdelaal 93' (pen.)

25 October 2015 2	Al Masry	1–1	Misr El Makasa	Ismailia Stadium, Ismailia
17:00 UTC+02:00	Raouf 86'		Poku 59'

31 October 2015 3	Enppi	2-1	Al Masry	Ismailia Stadium, Ismailia
14:45 UTC+02:00	Ashour 29'; Kaoud 33'		Gomaa 79'

7 November 2015 4	Al Masry	1-0	Ittihad El Shorta	Ismailia Stadium, Ismailia
14:45 UTC+2:00	Yasser 68'

15 November 2015 5	Al Masry	3-2	Haras El Hodoud	Ismailia Stadium, Ismailia
19:30 UTC+2:00	Magdy 33'; Raouf 59'; ElAgamy 90'		Roshdi 23'; Benzema 28'

28 November 2015 6	Smouha	1-1	Al Masry	Ismailia Stadium, Ismailia
17:00 UTC+2:00	Kamar 87' (pen.)		Raouf 47'

23 February 2016 7	Al Masry	2-2	Al Ahly	Borg El Arab Stadium, Alexandria
	Yasser 11'; Magdy 58' (pen.)		Mo'men 26'; Evouna 78'

17 December 2015 8	Wadi Degla	0-2	Al Masry	Ismailia Stadium, Ismailia
21:45 UTC+02:00			Raouf 59'; Gomaa 81'

22 December 2015 9	Al Masry	3-2	Aswan	Ismailia Stadium, Ismailia
18:00 UTC+02:00	Mourad 9' (pen.); Gomaa 64'; Magdy 83'		Salama 22'; El-Masry 76'

25 December 2015 10	El Entag El Harby	0-0	Al Masry	Ismailia Stadium, Ismailia
17:00 UTC+02:00

30 December 2015 11	Al Masry	3-2	Al Mokawloon	Ismailia Stadium, Ismailia
17:00 UTC+03:00	Caporia 8'; Raouf 50' 90'		Mostafa 49' 86'

2 January 2015 12	El Dakhleya	1-1	Al Masry	Ismailia Stadium, Ismailia
17:00 UTC+02:00	Sabri 49'		Magdy 76' (pen.)

10 January 2016 13	Al Masry	1-0	Ismaily	Ismailia Stadium, Ismailia
17:00 UTC+02:00	Gomaa 90'

15 January 2016 14	Al Ittihad	1-1	Al Masry	Ismailia Stadium, Ismailia
17:00 UTC+02:00	Obama 58' (pen.)		Magdy 41'

20 January 2016 15	Al Masry	0-1	Zamalek	Ismailia Stadium, Ismailia
19:45 UTC+02:00			Fathi 84'

31 January 2016 16	Tala'ea El Geish	3-3	Al Masry	Ismailia Stadium, Ismailia
17:00 UTC+02:00	Konan 4' 37' 81'		Caporia 39'; Azab 43'; Magdy 61'

5 February 2016 17	Al Masry	1-0	Ghazl El Mahalla	Ismailia Stadium, Ismailia
17:00 UTC+02:00	Raouf 89'

13 February 2016 18	Al Masry	0-0	Petrojet	Ismailia Stadium, Ismailia
19:45 UTC+02:00

18 February 2016 19	Misr El Makasa	2-2	Al Masry	Ismailia Stadium, Ismailia
17:00 UTC+02:00	Gaber 23'; Barakat 64'		Mourad 10'; Gomaa 84'

1 March 2016 20	Al Masry	4-0	Enppi	Ismailia Stadium, Ismailia
17:15UTC+02:00	Raouf 11' 45+3' 84'; Caporia 23'

7 March 2016 21	Ittihad El Shorta	0-1	Al Masry	Ismailia Stadium, Ismailia
17:15 UTC+02:00			Gomaa 75'

14 March 2016 22	Haras El Hodoud	3-1	Al Masry	Ismailia Stadium, Ismailia
17:15 UTC+02:00	Gamal 5'; Shaaban 7'; Gamal 9'		Yasser 20'

3 April 2016 23	Al Masry	0-1	Smouha	Ismailia Stadium, Ismailia
17:45 UTC+02:00			Paulo 1'

13 June 2016 24	Al Ahly	2–3	Al Masry	Borg El Arab Stadium, Alexandria
22:00 UTC+02:00	Ramadan 69' (pen.); Ghaly 88'		Dao 4'; Caporia 32'; Mosaad 54'

23 April 2016 25	Al Masry	0-0	Wadi Degla	Ismailia Stadium, Ismailia
17:30 UTC+02:00

1 May 2016 26	Aswan	1-1	Al Masry	Ismailia Stadium, Ismailia
17:45 UTC+02:00	Naguib 82'		Caporia 74'

8 May 2016 27	Al Masry	0-0	El Entag El Harby	Ismailia Stadium, Ismailia
20:00 UTC+02:00

12 May 2016 28	Al Mokawloon	2-1	Al Masry	Ismailia Stadium, Ismailia
15:45 UTC+02:00	Ali 13' 57'		Raouf 56'

18 May 2016 29	Al Masry	3-2	El Dakhleya	Ismailia Stadium, Ismailia
17:45 UTC+02:00	Sedik 20' Moussa 90'		Raouf 45' Gomaa 54' Mourad 74'

22 May 2016 30	Ismaily	1–1	Al Masry	Ismailia Stadium, Ismailia
17:45 UTC+02:00	Hassan 6'		Raouf 51'

10 June 2016 31	Al Masry	2-0	Al Ittihad	Ismailia Stadium, Ismailia
20:00 UTC+02:00	Mosaad 45+1' Mourad 52'

24 June 2016 32	Zamalek	2-2	Al Masry	Alexandria Stadium, Alexandria
20:00 UTC+02:00

30 June 2016 33	Al Masry	0-0	Tala'ea El Geish	Ismailia Stadium, Ismailia

34	Ghazl El Mahalla	2-2	Al Masry	Ismailia Stadium, Ismailia

== 2016 Egypt Cup ==
=== Round 32 ===
19 March 2016	Al Masry	0–0 (4–3 p)	Al Nasr Lel Taa'den	Ismailia Stadium, Ismailia
15:30 UTC+02:00				Referee: Nadr Zaky
	Penalties
	Magdy (penalty scored); Mansour (penalty scored); Caporia (penalty missed); Azab (penalty scored); Yasser (penalty scored)		(penalty missed) Abdelfattah; (penalty scored) Shabban; (penalty scored) Ali; (penalty missed) Yehia; (penalty scored) Mostafa

=== Round 16 ===
10 April 2016	Al Masry	2-1	El Dakhleya	Ismailia Stadium, Ismailia
17:45 UTC+02:00	Wilson 70'; Mourad 91'		Abdelnaim 49'

=== Round 8 ===
15 July 2016	Ismaily	v	Al Masry	Alexandria Stadium, Alexandria
	2		0
