= 2008 FIFA Club World Cup squads =

Association football squads

The 2008 FIFA Club World Cup was played in Japan from 11 December to 21 December 2008. Each team involved in the competition had to submit a provisional squad of 30 players by 5 November 2008, with the list to be narrowed down to a final squad of 23 players by 27 November.

== Adelaide United ==
Manager: (Australia) Aurelio Vidmar

Note: Flags indicate national team as defined under FIFA eligibility rules; some limited exceptions apply. Players may hold more than one non-FIFA nationality.

No.	Pos.	Nation	Player
2	DF	AUS	Robert Cornthwaite
3	DF	BRA	Alemão
4	DF	AUS	Angelo Costanzo
5	DF	AUS	Michael Valkanis
6	DF	BRA	Cássio
8	MF	AUS	Kristian Sarkies
9	FW	AUS	Paul Agostino
10	FW	BRA	Cristiano
11	MF	AUS	Osama Malik
13	MF	AUS	Travis Dodd (captain)
14	DF	AUS	Scott Jamieson
15	MF	AUS	Jonas Salley

No.	Pos.	Nation	Player
16	DF	AUS	Daniel Mullen
18	MF	AUS	Fabian Barbiero
19	DF	AUS	Saša Ognenovski
20	GK	AUS	Eugene Galeković
21	MF	AUS	Jason Spagnuolo
22	MF	BRA	Diego
23	DF	AUS	Michael Marrone
24	MF	AUS	Paul Reid
25	FW	AUS	Robert Younis
30	GK	AUS	Mark Birighitti
40	GK	AUS	Lucas Andreucci

== Al Ahly ==
Manager: (Portugal) Manuel José

Note: Flags indicate national team as defined under FIFA eligibility rules; some limited exceptions apply. Players may hold more than one non-FIFA nationality.

No.	Pos.	Nation	Player
1	GK	EGY	Amir Abdelhamid
2	GK	PLE	Ramzi Saleh
5	DF	EGY	Ahmad El-Sayed
6	MF	EGY	Ahmad Sedik
7	DF	EGY	Shady Mohamed (captain)
8	MF	EGY	Mohamed Barakat
10	FW	EGY	Ahmed Belal
11	DF	EGY	Sayed Moawad
12	MF	ANG	Sebastião Gilberto
13	MF	QAT	Hussain Yasser
15	FW	EGY	Hany El-Agazy
17	MF	EGY	Ahmed Hassan

No.	Pos.	Nation	Player
18	FW	EGY	Osama Hosny
19	MF	EGY	Hussein Ali
21	DF	EGY	Ramy Adel
22	MF	EGY	Mohamed Aboutrika
23	FW	ANG	Flávio Amado
24	MF	EGY	Ahmed Fathy
25	MF	EGY	Hossam Ashour
26	DF	EGY	Wael Gomaa
27	MF	EGY	Moataz Eno
31	GK	EGY	Ahmed Adel Abd El-Moneam
32	DF	EGY	Mohamed Samir

== Gamba Osaka ==
Manager: (Japan) Akira Nishino

Note: Flags indicate national team as defined under FIFA eligibility rules; some limited exceptions apply. Players may hold more than one non-FIFA nationality.

No.	Pos.	Nation	Player
1	GK	JPN	Naoki Matsuyo
2	DF	JPN	Sota Nakazawa
5	DF	JPN	Satoshi Yamaguchi (captain)
6	DF	JPN	Yohei Fukumoto
7	MF	JPN	Yasuhito Endō
8	MF	JPN	Shinichi Terada
9	FW	BRA	Lucas
10	MF	JPN	Takahiro Futagawa
11	FW	JPN	Ryūji Bando
13	MF	JPN	Michihiro Yasuda
14	FW	JPN	Shoki Hirai
16	MF	JPN	Hayato Sasaki

No.	Pos.	Nation	Player
17	MF	JPN	Tomokazu Myojin
18	FW	BRA	Rôni
19	DF	JPN	Takumi Shimohira
20	MF	JPN	Shu Kurata
21	DF	JPN	Akira Kaji
22	GK	JPN	Yosuke Fujigaya
23	MF	JPN	Takuya Takei
24	FW	JPN	Kenta Hoshihara
27	MF	JPN	Hideo Hashimoto
29	GK	JPN	Atsushi Kimura
30	FW	JPN	Masato Yamazaki

== LDU Quito ==
Manager: (Argentina) Edgardo Bauza

Note: Flags indicate national team as defined under FIFA eligibility rules; some limited exceptions apply. Players may hold more than one non-FIFA nationality.

No.	Pos.	Nation	Player
1	GK	ECU	José Francisco Cevallos
2	DF	ARG	Norberto Araujo
3	DF	ECU	Renán Calle
4	MF	ECU	Paúl Ambrosi
5	MF	ECU	Alfonso Obregón
7	MF	ECU	Luis Bolaños
8	FW	ECU	Patricio Urrutia (captain)
9	FW	ECU	Agustín Delgado
10	MF	ECU	Edder Vaca
11	MF	ECU	Danny Vaca
13	MF	ECU	Néicer Reasco
14	MF	ECU	Diego Calderón

No.	Pos.	Nation	Player
15	DF	ECU	William Araujo
16	FW	ARG	Claudio Bieler
17	FW	ECU	Cristian Suárez
19	FW	CHI	Reinaldo Navia
20	MF	ECU	Pedro Larrea
21	MF	ARG	Damián Manso
22	GK	ECU	Alexander Domínguez
23	DF	ECU	Jairo Campos
24	MF	ECU	Gabriel Espinosa
25	GK	ECU	Daniel Viteri
28	MF	ECU	Israel Chango

== Manchester United ==
Manager: (Scotland) Alex Ferguson

Note: Flags indicate national team as defined under FIFA eligibility rules; some limited exceptions apply. Players may hold more than one non-FIFA nationality.

No.	Pos.	Nation	Player
1	GK	NED	Edwin van der Sar
2	DF	ENG	Gary Neville (captain)
3	DF	FRA	Patrice Evra
5	DF	ENG	Rio Ferdinand
7	MF	POR	Cristiano Ronaldo
8	MF	BRA	Anderson
9	FW	BUL	Dimitar Berbatov
10	FW	ENG	Wayne Rooney
11	MF	WAL	Ryan Giggs (vice-captain)
13	MF	KOR	Park Ji-sung
15	DF	SRB	Nemanja Vidić
16	MF	ENG	Michael Carrick

No.	Pos.	Nation	Player
17	MF	POR	Nani
18	MF	ENG	Paul Scholes
19	FW	ENG	Danny Welbeck
21	DF	BRA	Rafael
22	DF	IRL	John O'Shea
23	DF	NIR	Jonny Evans
24	MF	SCO	Darren Fletcher
28	MF	IRL	Darron Gibson
29	GK	POL	Tomasz Kuszczak
32	FW	ARG	Carlos Tevez
40	GK	ENG	Ben Amos

== Pachuca ==
Manager: (Mexico) Enrique Meza Enríquez

Note: Flags indicate national team as defined under FIFA eligibility rules; some limited exceptions apply. Players may hold more than one non-FIFA nationality.

No.	Pos.	Nation	Player
1	GK	COL	Miguel Calero (captain)
2	DF	MEX	Leobardo López
3	DF	PAR	Julio Manzur
4	DF	MEX	Marco Iván Pérez
6	MF	MEX	Jaime Correa
7	MF	ARG	Damián Álvarez
8	MF	MEX	Gabriel Caballero
9	FW	ARG	Bruno Marioni
10	FW	BRA	Christian
11	FW	MEX	José María Cárdenas
12	MF	MEX	Juan Carlos Rojas
13	FW	MEX	Edwin Borboa

No.	Pos.	Nation	Player
15	MF	MEX	Luis Montes
16	MF	MEX	Carlos Gerardo Rodríguez
18	MF	USA	José Francisco Torres
19	MF	ARG	Christian Giménez
21	DF	MEX	Fausto Pinto
22	DF	MEX	Paul Aguilar
23	GK	MEX	Carlos Velázquez
24	MF	MEX	Raúl Martínez
27	MF	MEX	Edy Germán Brambila
29	FW	MEX	Víctor Mañon
30	GK	MEX	Rodolfo Cota

== Waitakere United ==
Manager: (New Zealand) Chris Milicich

Note: Flags indicate national team as defined under FIFA eligibility rules; some limited exceptions apply. Players may hold more than one non-FIFA nationality.

No.	Pos.	Nation	Player
1	GK	NZL	Richard Gillespie
2	DF	NZL	Jonathan Perry
3	DF	NZL	Aaron Scott
5	DF	NZL	Danny Hay
6	DF	NZL	Hone Fowler
7	FW	NZL	Daniel Ellensohn
8	MF	WAL	Paul Seaman
9	FW	SOL	Benjamin Totori
10	FW	NZL	Allan Pearce
11	MF	ENG	Neil Sykes
12	FW	FIJ	Roy Krishna
13	FW	NZL	Daniel Koprivcic

No.	Pos.	Nation	Player
14	MF	NZL	Jeff Campbell
15	MF	WAL	Christopher Bale
16	MF	ENG	Neil Emblen
17	MF	NZL	Jake Butler
19	MF	NZL	Mikael Munday
20	DF	NZL	Jason Rowley
21	FW	NZL	Kayne Vincent
22	GK	ENG	Dan Robinson
23	MF	NZL	Corey Hitchen
28	GK	NZL	Sean Dowling
29	MF	BRA	Adriano
