= 2016–17 Al Masry SC season =

2016–17 season
- Chairman: Samir Halabia
- Manager: Hossam Hassan
- Egyptian Premier League: 4th
- Egypt Cup: Runner-up
- CAF Confederation Cup: Play-off round
Home colours	Away colours

The 2016–17 season is Al-Masry's 56th season in the Egyptian Premier League which enters its 58th season since its inception in 1948. The club will participate in the Premier League, Egypt Cup, and the CAF Confederation Cup.

== Squad ==
=== Current squad ===
Squad No.	Name	Nationality	Position(s)	Date of birth (age)
Goalkeepers
1	Ahmed Abdelfattah	(Egypt)	GK	August 22, 1996 (age 20)
16	Ramzi Saleh	(Palestine)	GK	August 1, 1980 (age 36)
26	A. Boska	(Egypt)	GK	September 20, 1986 (age 30)
Defenders
2	Akakpo Wilson	(Ghana)	CB	October 10, 1992 (age 24)
3	Ahmed Ayman Mansour	(Egypt)	LB	April 13, 1994 (age 22)
7	Osama Azab (captain)	(Egypt)	RB / CB	August 27, 1986 (age 30)
13	Islam Salah	(Egypt)	CB	January 7, 1991 (age 25)
19	Mohamed Hamdy	(Egypt)	CB / LB	March 15, 1995 (age 21)
30	Ahmed Fawzy (Vice-captain)	(Egypt)	RB	February 10, 1984 (age 32)
Midfielders
4	Ahmed Moussa Caporia	(Egypt)	AM	January 17, 1988 (age 28)
5	Farid Shawqi	(Egypt)	DM	December 19, 1989 (age 28)
6	Mohamed Refaay Waeh	(Egypt)	CM / DM	August 16, 1990 (age 26)
8	Amr Moussa	(Egypt)	DM	November 17, 1988 (age 28)
10	Abdallah Gomaa	(Egypt)	LM	January 10, 1996 (age 21)
11	Said Mourad	(Egypt)	LM	August 1, 1983 (age 33)
12	Ahmed Kattawy	(Egypt)	RM / RB	November 8, 1990 (age 26)
14	Abdallah Samir Beka	(Egypt)	RM / MF	February 27, 1987 (age 29)
17	Mohamed Maged Onosh	(Egypt)	LM	June 23, 1991 (age 25)
20	Ahmed Salem Safi	(Egypt)	RM	July 13, 1987 (age 29)
21	Moussa Dao	(Burkina Faso)	DM	August 26, 1992 (age 24)
23	Sayed Abdelaal	(Egypt)	DM	May 9, 1986 (age 30)
24	Islam Saleh	(Egypt)	DM	January 6, 1995 (age 21)
25	Ahmed Shoukry	(Egypt)	LM / FW	July 21, 1989 (age 27)
27	Ahmed Samir	(Egypt)	LM	August 25, 1984 (age 22)
Forwards
9	Ahmed Shroyda	(Egypt)	FW	October 21, 1990 (age 26)
15	Ahmed Gomaa	(Egypt)	ST / FW / RM	January 16, 1988 (age 28)
18	Mohamed El Shamy	(Egypt)	LM / FW	August 1, 1996 (age 21)
28	Hermann Kouao	(Ivory Coast)	SS / ST	May 30, 1990 (age 26)
29	Hamada Nasser	(Egypt)	SS / ST	January 20, 1990 (age 26)

== 2016–17 Egyptian Premier League ==
=== Position ===
Pos	Team	Pld	W	D	L	GF	GA	GD	Pts	Qualification or relegation
2	Misr Lel Makkasa	34	23	5	6	65	34	+31	74	Qualification for the Champions League
3	Zamalek (Note: Zamalek was deducted three points as they did not show up to their home match against Misr Lel Makkasa.)	34	20	6	8	42	24	+18	63	Qualification for the Confederation Cup (Note: Since the winners of the 2016–17 Egypt Cup, Al Ahly, qualified for African competition based on league position, the spot awarded to the Cup winner (Confederation Cup) was given to the Cup runners-up, Al Masry.)
4	Al Masry	34	19	5	10	51	36	+15	62	Qualification for the Confederation Cup
5	Smouha	34	15	12	7	49	40	+9	57	
6	Ismaily	34	12	18	4	48	28	+20	54	

Source: Soccerway
Rules for classification: 1) Points; 2) Head-to-Head points; 3) Head-to-Head goal difference; 4) Head-to-Head goal scored; 5) Head-to-Head away goal scored; 6) Goal difference; 7) Goal scored.

=== Results ===
==== Results by round ====
Round	1	2	3	4	5	6	7	8	9	10	11	12	13	14	15	16	17	18	19	20	21	22	23	24	25	26	27	28	29	30	31	32	33	34
Ground	A	H	A	H	A	H	H	A	H	A	H	A	H	A	H	A	H	H	A	H	A	H	A	A	H	A	H	A	H	A	H	A	H	A
Result	L	W	W	L	W	L	W	L	D	W	W	W	W	W	W	L	W	L	W	W	L		W	L	L	L								
Position	11	5	6	7	6	9	7	7	7	5	5	5	4	3	3	4	4	4	4	4	4		3	3	4	4								

A = Away; H = Home; W = Win; D = Draw; L = Loss

==== Match details ====
17 September 2016 1	Tala'ea El Gaish	2-1	Al Masry	Borg El Arab Stadium, Alexandria
18:00 UTC+02:00	Abdel Malek 13'; Ashraf 40'		Samir 49'

24 September 2016 2	Al Masry	2-0	Al Nasr Lel Ta'din	Alexandria Stadium, Alexandria
15:00 UTC+02:00	Caporia 18'; Onosh 66'

28 September 2016 3	El Sharkia	0-1	Al Masry	Borg El Arab Stadium, Alexandria
18:00 UTC+02:00			Gomaa 69'

12 October 2016 4	Al Masry	0-1	Misr Lel Makkasa	Borg El Arab Stadium, Alexandria
19:30 UTC+02:00			El Sheikh 24' (pen.)

20 October 2016 5	Smouha	1-2	Al Masry	Borg El Arab Stadium, Alexandria
17:30 UTC+02:00	Raouf 12'		Gomaa 30'; Azab 41' (pen.)

27 October 2016 6	Al Masry	1-3	Enppi	Borg El Arab Stadium, Alexandria
17:00 UTC+02:00	Mansour 40'		El Shamy 24'; Sabry 45' (pen.); Koné 54'

31 October 2016 7	Al Masry	4-0	Tanta	Borg El Arab Stadium, Alexandria
14:45 UTC+02:00	Caporia 3'; Onosh 10'; Shoukry 27'; Onosh 59'

4 November 2016 8	Zamalek	1-0	Al Masry	Borg El Arab Stadium, Alexandria
20:30 UTC+02:00	Gaafar 45+2'

17 November 2016 9	Al Masry	1-1	Ismaily	Borg El Arab Stadium, Alexandria
19:30 UTC+02:00	Gomaa 74'		Nagieb 39'

22 November 2016 10	El Mokawloon	1-2	Al Masry	Borg El Arab Stadium, Alexandria
17:00 UTC+02:00	Fadl 16'		Mourad 11' Mansour 53'

26 November 2016 11	Al Masry	1-0	Wadi Degla	Borg El Arab Stadium, Alexandria
18:00 UTC+02:00	Hamdy 22'

30 November 2016 12	El Dakhelya	2-4	Al Masry	Borg El Arab Stadium, Alexandria
14:45 UTC+02:00	Azab 32' (o.g.); Abdelnaeem 53' (pen.)		Shoukry 20'; Caporia 45+3'; Shroyda 72'; Caporia 90+6'

4 December 2016 13	Al Masry	3-1	Aswan	Harras El Hodoud Stadium, Alexandria
17:00 UTC+02:00	Mansour 15'; Gomaa 60'; Kouao 90+3'		Ouiyah 83'

9 December 2016 14	Petrojet	1-2	Al Masry	Harras El Hodoud Stadium, Alexandria
17:30 UTC+02:00	Teddey 6'		Caporia 54'; Gomaa 67'

13 December 2016 15	Al Masry	1-0	El Ittihad	Borg El Arab Stadium, Alexandria
17:45 UTC+02:00	Gomaa 68'

18 December 2016 16	Al Ahly	3-1	Al Masry	Borg El Arab Stadium, Alexandria
20:00 UTC+02:00	Marwan 3'; Saad 48'; Abdallah 90' (pen.)		Safi 81'

30 December 2016 17	Al Masry	2-1	El Entag El Harby	Borg El Arab Stadium, Alexandria
17:00 UTC+02:00	Shawqi 10'; Gomaa 83'		Fathalla 74' (pen.)

28 February 2017 18	Al Masry	1-2	Tala'ea El Gaish	Borg El Arab Stadium, Alexandria
19:00 UTC+02:00	El Shamy 18'		Wilson 20' (o.g.); Ashraf 53'

4 March 2017 19	Al Nasr Lel Ta'din	v	Al Masry	Borg El Arab Stadium, Alexandria
19:00 UTC+02:00	Galal 89'		Shoukry 10'; Gomaa 53'; El Shamy 61'; Gomaa 65'

24 February 2017 20	Al Masry	1-0	El Sharkia	Borg El Arab Stadium, Alexandria
15:00 UTC+02:00	Shoukry 57' (pen.)

23 March 2017 21	Misr Lel Makkasa	4-2	Al Masry	Borg El Arab Stadium, Alexandria
18: 00 UTC+02:00	Traoré 15'; Traoré 56'; Daouda 72'; Antwi 87'		Nabil 17' (o.g.); Kouao 68'

27 March 2017 22	Al Masry	v	Smouha	Borg El Arab Stadium, Alexandria
14:45 UTC+02:00

2 April 2017 23	Enppi	0-2	Al Masry	Haras El Hodoud Stadium, Alexandria
19:30 UTC+02:00			Shoukry 6'; Gomaa 61'

19 April 2017 24	Tanta	2-1	Al Masry	Haras El Hodoud Stadium, Alexandria
15:00 UTC+02:00	Ghaly 6'; Helmy 25'		Kouao 74'

24 April 2017 25	Al Masry	0-1	Zamalek	Borg El Arab Stadium, Alexandria
17:00 UTC+02:00			Shikabala 10'

28 April 2017 26	Ismaily	2-1	Al Masry	Haras El Hodoud Stadium, Alexandria
18:30 UTC+02:00

3 May 2017 27	Al Masry	v	El Mokawloon	Borg El Arab Stadium, Alexandria
18:30 UTC+02:00

8 May 2017 28	Wadi Degla	v	Al Masry	Borg El Arab Stadium, Alexandria
18:45 UTC+02:00

18 May 2017 29	Al Masry	v	El Dakhelya	Borg El Arab Stadium, Alexandria
15:30 UTC+02:00

29 May 2017 30	Aswan	v	Al Masry	Borg El Arab Stadium, Alexandria
15:45 UTC+02:00

31	Al Masry	v	Petrojet	Borg El Arab Stadium, Alexandria

32	El Ittihad	v	Al Masry	Borg El Arab Stadium, Alexandria

33	Al Masry	v	Al Ahly	Borg El Arab Stadium, Alexandria

34	El Entag El Harby	v	Al Masry	Borg El Arab Stadium, Alexandria

== 2017 Egypt Cup ==
=== Round 32 ===
25 December 2016	Al Masry	3-1	Ghazl El Mahalla	Haras El Hodoud Stadium, Alexandria
17:00 UTC+02:00	Wilson 45+3'; Gomaa 105'; Caporia 120'		Sobhy 37'

=== Round 16 ===
5 February 2017	Al Masry	2-0	El Entag El Harby	Harras El Hodoud Stadium, Alexandria
16:00 UTC+02:00	El Shamy 1'; Shoukry 75' (pen.)

=== Round 8 ===
Al Masry	v	Enppi

== 2017 CAF Confederation Cup ==
=== Preliminary round ===
Team 1	Agg.	Team 2	1st leg	2nd leg
Ifeanyi Ubah F.C. (Nigeria)	1-1 (0-3 p)	(Egypt) Al Masry	1-0	0-1

12 February 2017	Ifeanyi Ubah F.C. (Nigeria)	1-0	(Egypt) Al Masry	FC IFEANYI UBAH International Stadium, Nnewi
17:00 UTC+02:00	Tamen 87'	Report		Referee: Maudo Jallow (The Gambia)

19 February 2017	Al Masry (Egypt)	1-0 (3-0 p)	(Nigeria) Ifeanyi Ubah F.C.	Ismailia Stadium, Ismailia
19:00 UTC+02:00	Shoukry 25' (pen.)	Report		Referee: Esam Al Jahani (Libya)
	Penalties
	Azab (penalty scored); Mourad (penalty scored); Shoukry (penalty scored)		(penalty missed) Elu; (penalty missed) Tamen; (penalty missed) Osanga

1–1 on aggregate. Al Masry won the penalty shoot-out and advanced to the 2017 CAF Confederation Cup First round.

=== First round ===
Team 1	Agg.	Team 2	1st leg	2nd leg
Djoliba AC (Mali)	-	(Egypt) Al Masry	2-0	-

12 March 2017	Djoliba AC (Mali)	2-0	(Egypt) Al Masry	Stade Modibo Kéïta, Bamako
19:00 UTC+02:00	Diallo 15' (pen.); Maïga 44'	Report		Referee: Issa Sy (Senegal)

18 March 2017	Al Masry (Egypt)	v	(Mali) Djoliba AC	Ismailia Stadium, Ismailia
19:00 UTC+02:00		Report		Referee: Bouchaib El Ahrach (Morocco)

FIFA suspended the Malian Football Federation on 17 March 2017. As a result, Djoliba AC could not continue to participate in the tournament and Al Masry won on walkover and advanced to the 2017 CAF Confederation Cup Play-off round.

=== Play-off round ===
Team 1	Agg.	Team 2	1st leg	2nd leg
KCCA (Uganda)	1-1	(Egypt) Al Masry	1-0	0-1

8 April 2017	KCCA (Uganda)	1-0	(Egypt) Al Masry	Phillip Omondi Stadium, Kampala
15:00 UTC+02:00	Nsibambi 94'	Report		Referee: Mahmoud Ali Mahmoud Ismail (Sudan)

15 April 2017	Al Masry (Egypt)	1-0 (3-4 p)	(Uganda) KCCA	Ismailia Stadium, Ismailia
19:00 UTC+02:00	Gomaa 24'	Report		Referee: Youssef Essrayri (Tunisia)
	Penalties
	Azab (penalty scored); Mourad (penalty missed); Mansour (penalty missed); Gomaa (penalty scored); Abdelaal (penalty scored)		(penalty scored) Serunkuuma; (penalty scored) Mutyaba; (penalty scored) Awany; (penalty missed) Majwega; (penalty scored) Ochan

1–1 on aggregate. KCCA won the penalty shoot-out and advanced to the 2017 CAF Confederation Cup group stage.
