= 2009–10 Egyptian Premier League =

Egyptian Premier League
- Season: 2009–10
- Dates: 6 August 2009 – 17 May 2010
- Champions: Al Ahly
- Relegated: Ghazl Mehalla; Mansoura; Asyut Petroleum
- CAF Champions League: Al Ahly (1st); Zamalek (2nd)
- CAF Confederation Cup: Ismaily (3rd); Haras El Hodood (CW)
- Top goalscorer: (Nigeria) Minusu Buba (14 Goals)
- Biggest home win: El Mansoura SC 4-0 Asyut Petroleum (24 November 2009) El-Ittihad 4-0 Asyut Petroleum (11 December 2009); Ittihad El-Shorta 4-0 Ghazl El-Mehalla (15 December 2009); Haras El Hodood 4-0 ENPPI (29 April 2010) Zamalek 4-1 Asyut Petroleum (13 May 2010)
- Biggest away win: Petrojet 1-4 Haras El Hodood (25 March 2010); Petrojet 0-3 Al-Mokawloon (17 May 2010)
- Highest scoring: El Geish 2-4 Al Ahly (11 September 2009) Al Ahly 4-2 Ittihad El-Shorta (12 February 2010); Asyut Petroleum 3-3 El Geish (24 March 2010); Zamalek 3-3 Al Ahly (16 April 2010); Al-Mokawloon 4-2 Asyut Petroleum (16 April 2010) Asyut Petroleum 4-2 El-Ittihad (3 May 2010)

The 2009–10 Egyptian Premier League is the fifty-third season of the Egyptian Premier League since its establishment in 1948. A total of 16 teams are contesting the league, with Al Ahly the defending champions for the fifth year in a row and for the thirty-fourth time in total. The Egyptian season began on 6 August 2009 and ended on 17 May 2010.

The defending champions, Al Ahly, won its sixth league title in a row after a 3–0 win against Mansoura.

== Overview ==
=== Promotion and relegation ===
Teams promoted from 2008–09 Egyptian Second Division

- Group A: El Entag El Harby
- Group B: El Mansoura
- Group C: Gouna

Teams relegated to 2009–10 Egyptian Second Division

- Itesalat
- Tersana
- Olympi

=== Teams and stadiums ===
The recently opened Borg El Arab Stadium in Alexandria its capacity 80,000 is currently mainly used for international competitions for Egyptian National Team, it was constructed as part of Egypt's failed bid to land the 2010 FIFA World Cup. However, there is speculation that League sides from Alexandria will eventually call it their home grounds. Cairo International Stadium is home to Egypt giants Al Ahly and Al-Zamalek and Ismailia Stadium is home to Al-Ismaily.

2010–11 Egyptian Premier League teams
Cairo and Giza 2010–11 Egyptian Premier League teams

Club	Location	Venue	Seating Capacity
Al Ahly	Cairo	Cairo International Stadium	74,100
Asyut Petroleum	Asyut	Asiut University Stadium	25,000
ENPPI Club	Cairo	Petro Sport Stadium	25,000
Talaea El-Geish	Cairo	Military Academy Stadium	22,000
Ghazl El-Mehalla	El-Mehalla	El Mahalla Stadium	29,000
Gouna	Hurghada	Gouna FC Stadium	13,000
Haras El Hodood	Alexandria	Haras El Hodoud Stadium	22,000
Ismaily	Ismailia	Ismailia Stadium	18,525
Al-Ittihad Al-Sakndary	Alexandria	Alexandria Stadium	13,660
Al-Mansoura	El Mansoura	El Mansoura Stadium	20,000
Al-Masry	Port Said	Port Said Stadium	17,988
Military Production	Cairo	Al Salam Stadium	30,000
Al-Mokawloon Al-Arab	Cairo	Osman Ahmed Osman	35,000
Petrojet	Suez	Suez Stadium	25,000
Police Union	Cairo	Military Academy Stadium	22,000
Al-Zamalek	Giza	Cairo International Stadium	74,100

=== Personnel and sponsoring ===
Team	Chairman	Team Coach	Team Captain	Kitmaker	Shirt sponsor
Al Ahly	(Egypt) Hassan Hamdy	(Egypt) Hossam El-Badry	(Egypt) Ahmed Belal	Adidas	Vodafone
ENPPI	(Egypt) Tarek Ghanim	(Egypt) Diaa Al-Sayed	(Egypt) Adel Moustafa	Nike	ENPPI
Ghazl El-Mehalla	(Egypt) Foad Abd El-Alim	(Egypt) Mohamed Radwan		Diadora	McDonald's
El Geish	(Egypt) Mostafa Kamel	(Egypt) Farouk Gaafar	(Egypt) Abdel Sattar Sabry	Diadora	McDonald's
Gouna	(Egypt) Samih Sawiris	(Egypt) Ismail Youssef		Umbro	Mobinil
Haras El Hodood	(Egypt) Abdel Rehim Mohamed	(Egypt) Tarek El Ashry	(Egypt) Mohamed Halim	Umbro	McDonald's
Ismaily	(Egypt) Nasr Abou El-Hassan	(Egypt) Emad Soliman	(Egypt) Mohamed Homos	Venecia	
El-Ittihad	(Egypt) Mohamed Meselhy	(Brazil) Carlos Cabral	(Egypt) Ibrahim El-Shayeb	Diadora	McDonald's
El-Masry	(Egypt) Kamel Abou Aly	(Egypt) Anwer Salama	(Egypt) Amr El-Desouky	Diadora	McDonald's
Mansoura	(Egypt) Ibrahim Megahed	(Egypt) Mohammed Helmy		Diadora	McDonald's
Military Production	(Egypt)	(Egypt) Tarek Yehia		Diadora	McDonald's
Mokawloon	(Egypt) Ibrahim Mahlab	(Egypt) Mohamed Amer		Diadora	Royal Ceramic
Petrojet	(Egypt) Tag El-Din Moharam	(Egypt) Mokhtar Mokhtar	(Egypt) Hisham Al-Nubi	Umbro	Esso
Asyut Petroleum	(Egypt)	(Egypt) Gamal Mohamed Ali		Diadora	McDonald's
Ittihad El-Shorta	(Egypt)	(Egypt) Talaat Youssef		Diadora	McDonald's
Zamalek	(Egypt) Mamdouh Abbas	(Egypt) Hossam Hassan	(Egypt) Abdelwahed El-Sayed	Adidas	Royal Ceramic

=== Managerial changes ===
Team	Outgoing manager	Manner of departure	Date of vacancy	Table	Incoming manager	Date of appointment	Table
Al Ahly	(Portugal) Manuel José	End of contract	31 May 2009	1st	(Egypt) Hossam El-Badry	22 June 2009	Pre-Season
Ismaily	(Brazil) Ricardo	Sacked	31 May 2009	2nd	(Serbia) Nebojsa Vukovic	9 July 2009	Pre-Season
ENPPI	(Egypt) Anwer Salama	Resigned	8 August 2009	13th	(Egypt) Diaa Al-Sayed	10 August 2009	13th
Ismaily	(Serbia) Nebojsa Vukovic	Sacked	22 August 2009	12th	(Egypt) Emad Soliman	22 August 2009	12th
Ghazl El-Mehalla	(Egypt) Sherif Al-Khashab	Resigned	27 August 2009	16th	(Egypt) Mohamed Radwan	27 August 2009	16th
El-Masry	(Hungary) Bertalan Bicskei	Sacked	29 August 2009	12th	(Egypt) Anwer Salama	29 August 2009	12th
Ittihad	(Egypt) Taha Basry	Sacked	30 August 2009	15th	(Brazil) Carlos Cabral	1 September 2009	15th
Zamalek	(Switzerland) Michel Decastel	Sacked	31 August 2009	6th	(France) Henri Michel	31 August 2009	6th
Zamalek	(France) Henri Michel	Sacked	29 November 2009	10th	(Egypt) Hossam Hassan	30 November 2009	10th

== Table and results ==
Egyptian Premier League 2009-2010 Winners
(Egypt)
Al Ahly
Thirty Fifth title

=== League table ===
Pos	Team	Pld	W	D	L	GF	GA	GD	Pts	Qualification or relegation
1	Al Ahly (C)	30	18	11	1	47	23	+24	65	2011 CAF Champions League
2	Zamalek	30	16	7	7	43	26	+17	55	2011 CAF Champions League
3	Ismaily	30	11	15	4	34	25	+9	48	2011 CAF Confederation Cup
4	Petrojet	30	13	8	9	42	37	+5	47 (Note: Petrojet and Police Union are ranked based on the results of the two matches played between them.)	
5	Police Union	30	12	11	7	35	24	+11	47	
6	Haras Hodood	30	11	12	7	39	31	+8	45	2011 CAF Confederation Cup
7	Military Production	30	11	8	11	36	32	+4	41	
8	ENPPI	30	10	11	9	29	34	−5	41	
9	Geish	30	9	13	8	42	38	+4	40	
10	Ittihad	30	9	8	13	27	36	−9	35	
11	Mokawloon	30	7	13	10	36	34	+2	34	
12	Gouna	30	8	10	12	26	32	−6	34	
13	Masry	30	6	16	8	28	35	−7	34	
14	Ghazl Mehalla (R)	30	7	10	13	17	30	−13	31	Relegation to Egyptian Second Division
15	Mansoura	30	3	10	17	21	37	−16	19	Relegation to Egyptian Second Division
16	Asyut Petroleum (R)	30	4	7	19	29	56	−27	19	Relegation to Egyptian Second Division

Source: FIFA.com
(C) Champions; (R) Relegated
Notes:
- Top 2 teams qualify for the 2011 CAF Champions League.
- Egyptian Cup winner & 3rd place team qualify for the 2011 CAF Confederation Cup.
- Bottom 3 teams are relegated to the Egyptian Second Division for the 2010–11 season.

=== Results ===
Home \ Away	AHL	MOK	ENP	TGS	GMH	HRS	ISM	ITH	MAS	MNS	PET	ASP	ITS	GOU	ENT	ZAM
Al Ahly	—	2–0	2–0	2–2	2–0	1–1	1–1	1–0	2–0	0–4	2–1	1–0	4–2	1–0	1–0	0–0
Al Mokawloon	1–1	—	1–3	1–1	1–1	2–0	1–1	4–1	1–1	0–6	1–1	4–2	0–0	2–0	0–0	2–2
ENPPI	1–2	2–1	—	0–0	2–2	2–1	1–1	1–0	1–1	1–4	0–0	3–1	1–0	2–1	1–2	1–3
Tala'ea El Gaish	2–4	2–1	2–0	—	0–0	2–3	1–1	0–1	3–1	0–4	3–2	3–1	2–2	1–2	1–1	0–1
Ghazl El Mahalla	2–0	2–1	1–0	1–0	—	0–0	0–1	0–0	0–3	0–2	1–3	1–2	0–0	0–0	1–1	0–1
Haras El Hodoud	1–1	1–0	4–0	0–0	1–1	—	0–0	0–1	2–2	3–4	1–3	2–0	1–1	1–1	2–3	2–1
Ismaily	1–1	1–0	2–3	1–1	2–0	0–0	—	3–0	1–1	0–5	1–3	0–0	1–0	1–2	2–1	0–0
Al Ittihad	1–1	1–1	1–1	1–3	1–0	1–1	0–1	—	1–1	1–5	1–0	4–0	1–0	2–0	1–0	1–2
Al Masry	1–1	0–0	0–0	2–2	1–0	1–1	1–2	1–1	—	0–3	0–1	2–1	1–3	1–1	2–1	1–3
El Mansoura	5–0	4–0	6–0	2–0	4–1	5–1	6–2	8–0	4–0	—	4–1	4–0	2–0	3–0	5–1	6–0
Petrojet	0–1	0–3	0–0	2–1	1–0	1–4	1–1	3–1	0–0	1–5	—	1–1	2–1	3–1	2–2	2–3
Asyut Petroleum	1–2	0–1	1–1	3–3	0–0	0–1	1–2	4–2	1–2	0–7	2–3	—	1–2	1–1	0–1	0–2
Ittihad El Shorta	1–2	1–1	0–0	2–0	4–0	2–1	0–0	2–0	1–1	1–2	0–0	2–1	—	1–0	2–0	2–0
El Gouna	0–0	3–2	0–1	1–1	0–2	2–0	2–2	2–1	0–0	1–5	1–0	0–1	0–1	—	2–0	0–1
El Entag El Harby	0–1	3–1	3–1	1–2	2–0	0–2	1–0	2–0	2–0	0–5	3–1	0–0	1–1	2–0	—	2–3
Zamalek	3–3	1–0	2–0	0–1	0–1	1–2	0–1	1–0	3–0	1–5	1–2	4–1	1–1	1–1	2–0	—

Updated to match(es) played on 17 May 2010. Source: filgoal.com
Legend: Blue = home team win; Yellow = draw; Red = away team win.

== Season statistics ==
=== Scoring ===
- First goal of the season: Ramy Rabie for Al-Mokawloon against El Geish, 5 minutes. (6 August 2009).
- Fastest goal in a match: 33 seconds – Shikabala for Zamalek against Petrojet. (20 August 2009).
- Goal scored at the latest point in a match: 90+2 minutes and 29 seconds – Sayed Mosaad for Zamalek against Al-Mokawloon (24 August 2009).
- First penalty kick of the season: 77 minutes – Ahmed Hossam Mido (Missed) for Zamalek against Petrojet (20 August 2009).

=== Discipline ===
- First yellow card of the season: Amr Al-Sulaya for El Mansoura against Ismaily, 10 minutes (6 August 2009).
- First red card of the season: Hussein Ali for ENPPI against Gouna, 77 minutes (25 August 2009).

== Goalscorers ==
Last updated: 24 May 2010; Source:

=== Top scorers ===
Pos.	Player	Club	Goals
1	(Nigeria) Minusu Buba	El-Shorta	14
2	(Ghana) Eric Bekoe	Petrojet	13
3	(Egypt) Ahmed Abdel-Ghani	Haras El Hodood	9
3	(Egypt) Ahmed Gaafar	Zamalek	9
3	(Egypt) Talaat Moharam	El Geish	9
3	(Egypt) Emad Moteab	Al Ahly	9
7	(Egypt) Ahmed Ali Kamel	Ismaily	8
7	(Egypt) Ahmed Eid Abdel Malek	Haras El Hodood	8
7	(Togo) Mickaël Dogbé	El Geish	8
7	(Egypt) Reda El-Weshi	Al-Mokawloon	8

== Broadcasting ==
When Al Ahly announced that their satellite channel will have the exclusive satellite rights of airing the team's domestic games but they will be broadcast terrestrially as usual the problem began. After that EFA have earlier announced their rejection of Al-Ahly's proposal that club's channel and ESC would be the only satellite broadcaster due to the Association's running contract with other satellite networks to air all league games. After that Al-Ahly president Hassan Hamdy confirmed that the club is still keen on maintaining their rights of exclusive satellite broadcasting to the club's league football games. In October 2008 A Bahraini corporation has made a bid of EGP 200 million to acquire the Egyptian League broadcasting exclusive rights, The company is also interested in televising and promoting the Egyptian cup games as well as Egypt's international matches, It is worth noting that the EFA's current EGP 18-million deal with several satellite channels will run out by the end of the ongoing season. After that several TV networks have decided to sue the Egyptian FA (EFA) and the public Radio and TV Union (ERTU) after being prevented from broadcasting a league game for Ahly. Zamalek chairman Mohamed Amer said his club might follow in the footsteps of arch-rivals Al Ahly in demanding the exclusive rights to broadcast their home league games. January, 2009 Egyptian Football Association (EFA) president Samir Zaher said that the league games' broadcasting row will be resolved before the upcoming Cairo derby. In April 2009 the Egyptian FA reached an agreement with IMG Media Company to sell the rights of broadcasting the Premier League next season, The company made an amazing offer, guaranteeing at least a EGP 140million revenue. They will also cost us nothing if they failed to reach that target. Before the Egyptian Super Cup, Egyptian FA president Samir Zaher said the local Super Cup between Al Ahly and Haras El Hodood, which is scheduled for 21 July, would not be televised as the row over broadcasting rights intensified, TV viewers will not be able to watch the season curtain-raiser after a seven-member committee failed to reach an agreement with the Egyptian Radio and Television Union (ERTU) over airing domestic games for next season, As the committee, which includes several clubs like Cairo duo Al Ahly and El Zamalek in addition to the FA, did not accept the Egyptian Radio and Television Union (ERTU)'s offer to broadcast league and cup matches for EGP90 million. After 4 days the ERTU has acquired the broadcasting rights of the Super Cup match between Al Ahly and Haras El Hodood for EGP1.25 million, The first week of the Egyptian premier league have not been broadcasting on the cable channels but only on the state TV channels. On 19 August 2009 (the second week of the league) Egyptian premier league clubs did not allow the state TV to air Wednesday's Egyptian Premier League matches after both parties failed to reach an agreement over the ongoing broadcasting saga, Only the first half of Haras El Hodood and El Geish match was broadcast while usual TV viewers had to listen to radio to follow game between title holders Al-Ahly and Ittihad El-Shorta. Zamalek will follow in the footsteps of those teams after deciding not to broadcast Thursday's match against Petrojet as Zamalek's spokesman Sabri Serag said on the club's official website. Finally after nearly two years and half the Egyptian Premier League broadcasting saga had been resolved, on Thursday 20 August 2009 this means that Thursday's league games will be broadcast live. Local Channel 2 and the Egyptian Satellite Channel are entitled to broadcast games for free, while private cable networks will be charged EGP 8million each per season.

== See also ==
- Egypt Cup 2009-10
- Egyptian Super Cup
- List of football clubs in Egypt
- Cairo derby
