= Mahmoud Samir =

Mahmoud Samir may refer to:

- Mahmoud El Sayed Samir (born 1983), Egyptian footballer with El Dakhleya
- Mahmoud Samir (footballer) (born 1985), Egyptian footballer with Al-Ittihad Al-Sakandary
- Mahmoud Samir (fencer) (born 1981), Egyptian fencer
