= Carlos Cabral =

Carlos Cabral may refer to:

- Cabralzinho (footballer) (Carlos Roberto Cabral), Brazilian football player and manager
- Carlos Cabral Jr., songwriter, producer, and arranger
- Carlos Cabral (athlete), Portuguese athlete
- Carlos Alberto Cabral, original owner of Casa de Serralves, Porto, Portugal
