= Hany El Agazy =

Egyptian footballer (born 1985)

Personal information
- Full name: Hany Mohamed Shaaban Ahmed El Agazy
- Date of birth: 18 January 1985 (age 41)
- Place of birth: Faraskur, Damietta, Egypt
- Height: 1.87 m (6 ft 2 in)
- Position: Forward

Youth career
- MS Faraskur
- Zamalek

Senior career*
Years	Team	Apps	(Gls)
2003–2007	Zamalek	5	(0)
2007–2008	Baladeyet El Mahalla	4	(1)
2008–2011	Al Ahly	18	(3)
2010–2011	→ Al Ittihad (loan)	22	(6)
2011–2017	Smouha	96	(20)
2017	El Entag El Harby	4	(0)
2017–2018	El Raja	12	(1)
2018–2019	Al Muzahimiyyah	0	(0)

International career^{‡}
2014	Egypt	1	(0)
- * Club domestic league appearances and goals as of 18:03, 18 August 2018 (UTC) ‡ National team caps and goals as of 19:56, 30 August 2014 (UTC)

Hany Mohamed Shaaban Ahmed El Agazy (Arabic: هاني محمد شعبان أحمد العجيزي; born 18 January 1985), sometimes spelled El Egeizy, is an Egyptian footballer who plays as a forward.

== Club career ==
=== Early career ===
El Agazy is the product of Zamalek's youth department. Since, he could not establish himself in the first team, he moved to Baladeyet El Mahalla. The young striker became one of his new team's stars. He was his club's top scorer in the 2007–08 Egyptian Premier League with 6 goals.

=== Al Ahly ===
El Agazy's success at Baladeyet El Mahalla convinced Egypt's giant Al Ahly to sign him. On 25 September 2008, he scored a brace on his debut for his new club 4–0 win against Petrojet in the Egyptian Premier League. He scored the equalizer against Kano Pillars F.C. in the away leg of their 2009 CAF Champions League match. However, El-Agazy struggled to establish himself in Al Ahly's first team. In November 2009, he overcame a pelvic injury and was determined to feature regularly at Al Ahly starting line.

=== Al Ittihad ===
The out-of-favor striker eventually agreed to sign a loan deal with Al Ittihad as part of an exchange deal with Al Ahly. Ittihad received 7 million L.E. in addition to both El Agazy and Ahmed Ali for selling the 2010 Africa Cup of Nations top scorer; Mohamed Nagy "Gedo".

== Honours ==
=== Al Ahly ===
- Egyptian Premier League: 2008–09, 2009–10
- CAF Super Cup: 2009.
