= Vincent Die Foneye =

Ivorian footballer

Vincent Die Fonéyé
Personal information
- Full name: Vincent de Paul Die Fonéyé
- Date of birth: July 15, 1979 (age 47)
- Place of birth: Ivory Coast
- Height: 1.80 m (5 ft 11 in)
- Position: Striker

Team information
- Current team: Haras El-Hodood
- Number: 21

Senior career*
Years	Team	Apps	(Gls)
2001–2002	Stella Club d'Adjamé		
2003–2007	ASEC Mimosas		
2007–2014	ENPPI	93	(29)
2014–2015	Haras El-Hodood	0	
- * Club domestic league appearances and goals as of September 17, 2007

Vincent Die Foneye (born July 15, 1979) is a retired Ivorian footballer, who played as a striker for the Egyptian team ENPPI.

== Career ==
Dié Fonéyé began playing football with local side Stella Club d'Adjamé, where he helped the club gain promotion to the first division. Midway through the following season, he joined rival first division side ASEC Mimosas, where he would win four league titles and three cup titles.

== Honours ==
- Egypt cup winner: 2009-10
