= Abdallah Ragab =

Egyptian footballer (born 1977)

Personal information
- Full name: Abdallah Ragab
- Date of birth: October 26, 1977 (age 48)
- Place of birth: Cairo, Egypt
- Position: Left midfielder

Team information
- Current team: Telephonat Bani Sweif
- Number: 19

Senior career*
Years	Team	Apps	(Gls)
- Masry
2006–2010	ENPPI		
2010–2011	El Gaish	26	(0)
2011–	Telephonat Bani Sweif	6	(0)

International career^{‡}
2005–	Egypt	4	(0)
- * Club domestic league appearances and goals as of December 26, 2011 ‡ National team caps and goals as of March 16, 2010

Abdallah Ragab (Arabic: عبد الله رجب) is a defensive (left) midfielder for Egyptian Premier League team Telephonat Bani Sweif. Ragab enjoyed a successful spell at Masry before joining ENPPI.

As of April 2010 he has earned four caps but is not included in the current squad selection line-up.
