= Tarek Soliman =

Egyptian footballer (born 1962)

Personal information
- Full name: Tarek Mohamed Soliman
- Date of birth: January 24, 1962 (age 64)
- Place of birth: Port Said, Egypt
- Position: Defensive midfielder

Youth career
- Al-Masry

Senior career*
Years	Team	Apps	(Gls)
1981–1989	Al-Masry		
1989–1990	Neuchâtel Xamax		
1990–1991	Al Merreikh		
1991–1995	Al-Masry		

International career
1982–1992	Egypt	34	(1)

Managerial career
- 2008: Al-Masry
- 2009: Telecom Egypt
- 2009–2011: Zamalek
- 2011: Ismaily
- 2012: Al-Masry
- 2012: Al-Saqr
- * Club domestic league appearances and goals

Tarek Mohamed Soliman (Arabic: طَارِق مُحَمَّد سُلَيْمَان; born 24 January 1962) is a retired Egyptian footballer. He played as a midfielder for Al-Masry and the Egyptian national team.

Soliman made two dozen appearances for the Egypt national football team, including participating in the African Cup of Nations in 1988 and 1992. He also played in the 1990 FIFA World Cup finals.

== Honours ==
National Team

- The second place in the Arab Cup Of Nations for Egypt 1988.

Al-Masry

- The third place in the Egyptian League 1983–84.
- The second place in the Egyptian Soccer Cup 1982–83, 1983–84, 1988–89
