= Anwar Salama =

Egyptian football manager (born 1947)

Personal information
- Date of birth: 14 March 1947 (age 79)
- Position: Midfielder

Senior career*
Years	Team	Apps	(Gls)
1967–1981	Al Ahly		

Managerial career
- 1987–1988: Al Ahly
- 1992: Al Ahly
- 1997–1998: Al Masry
- 1998–1999: Sharkia
- 1999: Egypt
- 2000–2001: El Qanah
- 2001–2002: Goldi
- 2002: Al Masry
- 2002–2003: Tersana
- 2004–2005: Tersana
- 2006–2007: Asyut Petroleum
- 2007–2009: ENPPI
- 2009–2010: Al Masry
- 2010: Al-Ittihad Tripoli
- 2010–2013: El Gouna
- 2014: Al Masry
- 2014: El Gaish
- * Club domestic league appearances and goals

Anwar Salama (born 14 March 1947) is an Egyptian football manager and former player.
