= Mohamed Amer (football manager) =

Egyptian football manager (born 1954)

Personal information
- Date of birth: 23 April 1954 (age 72)

Senior career*
Years	Team	Apps	(Gls)
1974–1975	Kafr El Sheikh		
1975–1983	Al Ahly		

International career
1980–19??	Egypt	5	

Managerial career
- 1995–1997: Aswan
- 1998–1999: Aswan
- 1999: El Sharkia
- 2000: Suez
- 2002–2003: Aswan
- 2004: Baladeyet
- 2004–Jul 2005: Suez Cement
- Nov 2005–2007: Suez Cement
- 2007–2009: Asyut Petroleum
- 2009–2010: Al Mokawloon
- 2010–2011: Al Ittihad
- 2011–2016: Al Ahly B (specialized conductor)
- 2016: Ghazl El Mahalla
- 2016–2017: Aswan
- 2018–2020: Gomhoriat Shebin
- * Club domestic league appearances and goals

Mohamed Amer (Arabic: مُحَمَّد عَامِر; born 23 April 1954) is an Egyptian football manager.
