= Mostafa Shebeita =

Egyptian footballer (born 1986)

Personal information
- Full name: Mostafa Yehia Mohamed Shebeita مصطفى شبيطة
- Date of birth: May 10, 1986 (age 40)
- Place of birth: Banha, Egypt
- Height: 1.81 m (5 ft 11 1/2 in)
- Positions: Defensive midfielder; defender

Team information
- Current team: PETROJET

Youth career
- Al-Ahly

Senior career*
Years	Team	Apps	(Gls)
2007–2011	Al-Ahly	18	(1)
2007–2008	→ Suez Cement (loan)	6	(1)
2008–2009	→ Itesalat (loan)	25	(1)
2010–2011	→ Wadi Degla (loan)	25	(3)
2011–	Wadi Degla	13	(0)
2013	→ Lierse (loan)	3	(0)
- * Club domestic league appearances and goals

Mostafa Shebeita (Arabic: مصطفى شبيطة) (born on 10 May 1986) is an Egyptian football midfielder currently playing for Wadi Degla.

== Career ==
=== 2009/2010 season ===
Shebeita was named in the Al Ahly roster of surprisingly as it was said that he was going to Etisalat. Shebeita scored his first goal for Al Ahly against Wydad Casablanca from a penalty in a pre-season match. Shebeita scored his first League goal for Al Ahly against Ismaily SC. He was chosen for the preliminary African Cup of Nations 2010 squad for Egypt but was left out of the final 23-man squad.

=== 2010/2011 season ===
Mostafa scored a goal for Wadi Degla FC in the match against El Gouna FC, it was the second goal in winning 3/1.
