= Sherif Abdel-Fadil =

Egyptian footballer (born 1983)

Personal information
- Full name: Sherif Mohamed Abdel-Fadil
- Date of birth: July 2, 1983 (age 43)
- Place of birth: Ismailia, Egypt
- Height: 1.76 m (5 ft 9 in)
- Position: Full back

Youth career
- Ismaily

Senior career*
Years	Team	Apps	(Gls)
2003–2009	Ismaily	91	(1)
2009–2015	Al Ahly	65	(3)
2016–2017	Ismaily	3	(0)

International career^{‡}
2009–2014	Egypt	8	(0)
- * Club domestic league appearances and goals ‡ National team caps and goals as of 5 August 2014

Sherif Mohamed Abdel-Fadil (Arabic: شريف محمد عبد الفضيل; born 2 July 1983) is an Egyptian footballer.

== Club career ==
=== Ismaily ===
Reports linked Abdel-Fadil with a move to Al Ahly following the 2007–08 season, but the move never materialized.

=== Al-Ahly ===
In Summer 2009, Al Ahly and his rival El Zamalek began a war to sign Ismaily's defender. El Zamalek was too close to sign Abdel-Fadil, but the defender failed to agree personal terms of his contract with the Cairo club. Eventually, Al-Ahly have pulled a transfer surprise by snatching Ismaily's defender from under the noses of Zamalek. Abdel-Fadil penned a four-year contract with Al-Ahly on Friday 31 July. Al-Ahly agreed to pay EGP7.5 million in addition to the right-back, Ahmad Sedik, to complete the deal with Ismaily.

== International career ==
Sherif was selected for the Egypt national football team preliminary squad which will defend their title in ACN 2008 in Ghana, but did not make the final squad.
