= Abdelhamid Hassan =

Egyptian footballer

Personal information
- Date of birth: 24 September 1972 (age 54)
- Place of birth: Giza, Egypt
- Height: 1.80 m (5 ft 11 in)
- Position: Forward

Team information
- Current team: Ittihad
- Number: 9

Youth career
- ENPPI

Senior career*
Years	Team	Apps	(Gls)
2000–2006	ENPPI		
2006	Assiut Petrol		
2006–2007	El-Ahly	6	(1)
2008–present	Ittihad		
- * Club domestic league appearances and goals as of 1 March 2007 ‡ National team caps and goals as of 1 March 2007

Abdelhamid "Mido" Hassan (Arabic: عبدالحميد حسن) (born 24 September 1972) is an Egyptian footballer. He plays in the striker position for Egypt's Ittihad.

== Career ==
Abdelhamid holds the record for the 2nd fastest goal scored in the history of Egyptian football competitions. The goal took place in a match in 2006 with ENPPI against Ghazl El-Mehalla, after just 13 seconds of play-time.

Abdelhamid transferred to El-Ahly in January 2007. He was injured on 23 Feb 2007 in a game against Tersana, and was side-lined for 8 weeks.

== Honours ==
- Winner of Egyptian League (2006–2007).
- Winner of Egyptian Soccer Cup 2007.
- Winner of African Super Cup 2007.
- Winner of Egyptian Cup 2005.
