= Abdullah Farouk =

Egyptian football midfielder (born 1986)

Personal information
- Full name: Abdullah Farouk
- Date of birth: 19 August 1986 (age 40)
- Place of birth: Egypt
- Position: Midfielder

Team information
- Current team: AL-Ahly
- Number: 19

Youth career
- Al-Ahly

Senior career*
Years	Team	Apps	(Gls)
2007–present	Al-Ahly	25	(1)
2008–2009	→ Ittihad El-Shorta (loan)	26	(0)
- * Club domestic league appearances and goals

Abdullah Farouk (Arabic: عبدالله فاروق) (born on 19 August 1986) is an Egyptian football midfielder who plays for Egyptian Premier League club Al-Ahly

== 2009/2010 season ==
In the 2009/2010 season Abdullah Farouk was included in the Ahly squad surprisingly as it was said that he will be heading some place else. Abdullah Farouk performed superbly and is now a regular in the squad. Abdullah's position has changed throughout the weeks.
