= Cofie Bekoe =

Ghanaian footballer

Cofi Bekoe
Personal information
- Full name: Cofie Bekoe
- Date of birth: 16 March 1988 (age 38)
- Place of birth: Accra, Ghana
- Height: 5 ft 6 in (1.68 m)
- Position: Midfielder

Team information
- Current team: Ittihad Tripoli

Youth career
- Nania F.C.

Senior career*
Years	Team	Apps	(Gls)
2005–2006	Tripoli SC		
2006–2008	Tema Youth		
2007–2008	→ Kuala Lumpur FA (loan)	13	(5)
2009–2011	Petrojet	29	(7)
2011–2013	Lierse SK	19	(1)
2013–	Ittihad Tripoli		

International career
2010	Ghana	1	(0)
- * Club domestic league appearances and goals

Cofie Bekoe (born 16 March 1988) is a Ghanaian footballer who plays for Libyan side Ittihad as an attacking midfielder.

== Career ==
Cofie began his career by Nania F.C. and plays with his team by the Youth Cup in Altstetten 2004 and 2005, he was with his team in the Final 2004 and 2005 won also the silver medal. The team captain from Nania F.C. moved in July 2005 to Lebanese club Tripoli SC, before in January 2006 joined to Tema Youth. He played the 2007/08 season on an eight months loan with Kuala Lumpur FA in Malaysia where he scored 5 goals in the league and 2 in cup matches, he then returned to finish the season with Tema Youth. Bekoe was set to join Accra Hearts of Oak SC, but instead Petrojet made a very quick move and the player welcomed it likewise his manager on 17 December 2008.

=== Position ===
Bekoe is a midfield allrounder. He plays as an attacking midfielder all across the pitch and sometimes as a right-sided forward or striker.
