= Mohab Said =

Egyptian footballer (born 1987)

Personal information
- Date of birth: August 11, 1987 (age 39)
- Place of birth: Egypt
- Position: Midfielder

Team information
- Current team: Aswan
- Number: 20

Youth career
- Tanta

Senior career*
Years	Team	Apps	(Gls)
2006–2008	Tanta		
2008–2013	Ismaily	81	(7)
2011	→ Al Ittihad (loan)	0	(0)
2013–2015	Wadi Degla	44	(5)
2015–2016	Petrojet	3	(0)
2016	Al-Masry	8	(0)
2016–	Aswan	3	(1)
- * Club domestic league appearances and goals as of 8 October 2016

Mohab Said (Arabic: مهاب سعيد) (born 11 August 1987) is an Egyptian football midfielder who plays for Egyptian Premier League club Ismaily.
