= Ateya El-Belqasy =

Egyptian footballer (born 1984)

Attiya al Belqasi
Personal information
- Full name: Attiya Ahmad al Belqasi
- Date of birth: January 22, 1984 (age 42)
- Place of birth: Alexandria, Egypt
- Position: Centre back

Team information
- Current team: El-Ittihad

Senior career*
Years	Team	Apps	(Gls)
2005–2006	Ghazl Domiat		
2006–2007	Baladeya		
2007–2009	El-Olympi		
2009–2010	El-Ahly	0	(0)
2009	→ Ahly Benghazi (loan)	3	(0)
2010	→ Al-Mokawloon (loan)		
2010–	El-Ittihad		
- * Club domestic league appearances and goals as of December 30, 2009

Ateya Ahmed El-Belqasi (Arabic: عَطِيَّة أَحْمَد الْبَلْقَاسِيّ; born January 22, 1984) is an Egyptian footballer. He currently plays as a defender for the Egyptian Premier League club El-Ittihad.

== Career ==
El-Belqasi joined El Ahly in an £E800,000 transfer from El-Olympi in 2009. He had previously played for Ghazl Domiat and Baladeyet El-Mehalla.

After a brief spell at Libyan Premier League club Ahly Benghazi on loan, El-Belqasy left the club, saying he felt he would "not benefit from playing in the Libyan Premier League due to its poor standard of players and the poor state of the stadia." He also said that he felt that players in the Egyptian Third Division were better than those in the Libyan Premier League.
