= Said Mourad =

Egyptian footballer (born 1983)

Personal information
- Full name: Said Samir Mohamed Mourad
- Date of birth: 1 June 1983 (age 43)
- Place of birth: Egypt
- Position: Midfielder

Team information
- Current team: El Dakhleya
- Number: 17

Senior career*
Years	Team	Apps	(Gls)
2007–2009	Baladeyet El Mahalla		
2009–2010	Olympic Club		
2010–2013	El Entag El Harby	52	(7)
2013–2014	Ittihad El Shorta	14	(2)
2014–2015	Misr Lel Makkasa	17	(2)
2015–2018	Al Masry	41	(5)
2017–2018	→ Al Assiouty Sport (loan)	13	(1)
2018–2019	Haras El Hodoud	3	(0)
2019–	El Dakhleya	3	(0)
- * Club domestic league appearances and goals as of 17:56, 2 March 2019 (UTC)

Said Mourad (Arabic: سعيد مراد; born 1 June 1983), is an Egyptian footballer who plays for Egyptian Premier League side El Dakhleya as a midfielder.
