= Mohammed Al-Mukhaini =

Omani footballer (born 1982)

Personal information
- Full name: Mohammed Hamad Hidaib Al-Mukhaini
- Date of birth: 2 December 1982 (age 43)
- Place of birth: Oman
- Height: 1.63 m (5 ft 4 in)
- Position: Midfielder

Senior career*
Years	Team	Apps	(Gls)
1999–2005	Al-Oruba	?	(3)
2005–2008	Al-Salmiya	?	(2)
2008–2014	Al-Oruba	?	(0)
2014–2016	Sur		

International career
2000–2012	Oman	26	(1)
- * Club domestic league appearances and goals

Mohammed Hamad Hidaib Al-Mukhaini (Arabic: محمد حمد المخيني; born 2 December 1982), commonly known as Mohammed Al-Mukhaini, is an Omani footballer who plays for Sur SC.

== Club career ==
On 26 August 2014, he signed a one-year contract with Sur SC.

== Club career statistics ==
Club	Season	Division	League		Cup		Continental		Other		Total	
Club	Season	Division	Apps	Goals	Apps	Goals	Apps	Goals	Apps	Goals	Apps	Goals
Al-Oruba	2003–04	Omani League	-	1	-	0	0	0	-	0	-	1
Al-Oruba	2004–05	Omani League	-	2	-	1	0	0	-	0	-	3
Al-Oruba	Total		-	3	-	1	0	0	-	0	-	4
Al-Salmiya	2005–06	Kuwaiti Premier League	-	2	-	0	0	0	-	0	-	2
Al-Salmiya	Total		-	2	-	0	0	0	-	0	-	2
Career total			-	5	-	1	0	0	-	0	-	6

== International career ==
Mohammed was selected for the national team for the first time in 2010. He has made appearances in the 2002 FIFA World Cup qualification, the 2004 AFC Asian Cup qualification, the 2004 AFC Asian Cup, the 2006 FIFA World Cup qualification, the 2007 AFC Asian Cup qualification and the 2014 FIFA World Cup qualification.

== Honours ==
=== Club ===
- With Al-Oruba

- Omani League (2): 1999–00, 2001–02; Runner-up 2000–01, 2004–05
- Sultan Qaboos Cup (1): 2001; Runner-up 2000
- Omani Super Cup (2): 2001, 2002

- With Al-Salmiya

- Kuwait Emir Cup (0): 2007, 2008
