= Moussa Dao =

Burkinabé footballer

Personal information
- Full name: Moussa Dao
- Date of birth: 26 August 1992 (age 34)
- Place of birth: Burkina Faso
- Position: Defensive midfielder

Senior career*
Years	Team	Apps	(Gls)
2014−2015	Al Hammam		
2015−2017	Al Masry		
2017−2018	Pyramids		
2018−2019	Al-Jahra		
2019−2020	Aswan		
2020−2021	Al-Talaba		

International career
2009	Burkina Faso U-17		
- * Club domestic league appearances and goals as of 7 September 2021

Moussa Dao (born 26 August 1992) is a Burkinabé professional football player who currently plays as a defensive midfielder.
