= Amir Abdelhamid =

Egyptian footballer (born 1979)

Personal information
- Full name: Amir Abdelhamid Mohamed
- Date of birth: April 24, 1979 (age 47)
- Place of birth: Qanatir el Qahiriya, Qalyubia, Egypt
- Height: 1.81 m (5 ft 11 in)
- Position: Goalkeeper

Youth career
- Al Ahly

Senior career*
Years	Team	Apps	(Gls)
1999–2010	Al Ahly	40	(0)
2010–2012	Al-Masry	26	(0)
2012–2014	Smouha	26	(0)
2014–2015	Wadi Degla	22	(0)
2015–2017	El-Entag El-Harby	41	(0)
2017–2017	Al Ittihad Alexandria Club	0	(0)
2017–2018	El Dakhleya SC	3	(0)

International career^{‡}
2008–2009	Egypt	2	(0)
- * Club domestic league appearances and goals as of 1 July 2023 ‡ National team caps and goals as of 1 July 2023

Amir Abdelhamid Mohamed (Arabic: أمير عبد الحميد محمد) (born April 24, 1979) is an Egyptian footballer. He plays the goalkeeper position. He started his career in Al Ahly and became his first goalkeeper after Essam El-Hadary escaped to FC Sion on 21 February 2008. He proved excellence in the games he played. Thus, Egyptian commentators asks him to wait for his chance, as they see that he will be the Egyptian national goalkeeper. Amir was once considered the third goalkeeper for the national team.

Amir played 10 minutes with Al Ahly against Internacional of Brazil in the semi-final of FIFA Club World Cup 2006, and the whole 3rd place match versus Club América of Mexico.

On May 15, 2008, Amir has been chosen for the first time in the Egypt squad for the FIFA World Cup qualifiers.
