= Nebojša Vučković =

Serbian footballer and manager (1949–2019)

Personal information
- Full name: Nebojša Vučković
- Date of birth: 13 May 1949
- Place of birth: Zagreb, PR Croatia, FPR Yugoslavia
- Date of death: 13 May 2019 (aged 70)
- Place of death: Belgrade, Serbia
- Height: 1.72 m (5 ft 8 in)
- Position: Forward

Senior career*
| Years | Team | Apps | (Gls) |
| 1970–1971 | Dinamo Pančevo | | |
| 1973–1974 | Bačka | | |
| 1974–1977 | Vojvodina | 38 | (7) |
| 1977–1979 | LASK | 36+ | (7+) |
| 1979–1981 | Rad | 18 | (1) |
| 1981–1982 | Béziers | 22+ | (4+) |
| Total | | 114+ | (19+) |

Managerial career
- 199x–200x: Qadsia (youth)
- 200x–200x: Al-Wakrah
- 2005: Bežanija
- 2006–2007: Al-Ahli
- 2007–2008: Al-Ahli
- 2008: Al Kharaitiyat
- 2008–2009: Al-Sailiya
- 2009: Ismaily
- 2013: Al-Nasr
- 2015: Donji Srem
- * Club domestic league appearances and goals

Nebojša Vučković (Serbian Cyrillic: Небојша Вучковић; 13 May 1949 – 13 May 2019) was a Serbian football manager and player.

== Playing career ==
Vučković spent three seasons with Vojvodina as a forward in the Yugoslav First League between 1974 and 1977. He also played abroad in Austria and France in the late 1970s and early 1980s.

== Managerial career ==
During the late 1990s and early 2000s, Vučković worked with the youth teams at Qadsia in Kuwait. He later served as manager of various other clubs in the Middle East, including Al-Ahli, Al-Sailiya and Ismaily.

== Death ==
Vučković died on his 70th birthday in Belgrade after a long illness.

== Honours ==
Al-Ahli

- Saudi Crown Prince Cup: 2006–07
