= Ahmed Gomaa =

Egyptian footballer (born 1988)

Ahmed Gomaa أَحْمَد جُمْعَة
Personal information
- Full name: Ahmed Mohamed Ali Gomaa
- Date of birth: 16 August 1988 (age 38)
- Place of birth: Kafr El Sheikh, Egypt
- Height: 1.78 m (5 ft 10 in)
- Position: Forward

Team information
- Current team: Al Masry

Youth career
- 2003–2004: Abou Bedway
- 2004–2008: Ghazl El Mahalla

Senior career*
Years	Team	Apps	(Gls)
2008–2009	Ghazl El Mahalla		
2009–2011	El Raja		
2011–2014	El Mansoura	50	(26)
2014–	Al Masry	112	(34)
2015	→ Ittihad El Shorta (loan)	19	(4)
2019	→ Ohod (loan)	6	(1)

International career^{‡}
2017–	Egypt	2	(0)
- * Club domestic league appearances and goals as of 18:57, 8 January 2019 (UTC) ‡ National team caps and goals as of 20:16, 14 September 2019 (UTC)

Ahmed Mohamed Ali Gomaa (Arabic: أَحْمَد مُحَمَّد عَلِيّ جُمْعَة; born 16 August 1988), is an Egyptian footballer who played for Egyptian Premier League side Al Masry, and the Egyptian national team as a forward. Last playing for ENPPI SC in 2021. He is currently a free agent.

== Club career ==
=== Abou Bedway ===
In 2003, during Ramadan when Gomaa was playing football with his friends, Abou Bedway's manager, Ibrahim Abou Sita, offered him a trial at the club; Gomaa didn't like the idea to join a football club and wanted to play football only as a hobby, but his family and friends convinced him that joining the club may be the start of a great football career. Gomma joined Abou Bedway at the age of 15 and played for the reserve team for only one year, before he moved to Ghazl El Mahalla.

=== Ghazl El Mahalla ===
In 2004, Gomma joined Ghazl El Mahalla and was selected to play for the reserve team. After playing for the reserves for 4 years he was promoted to the first team after the manager, Khaled Eid, was impressed by his style of play. However, Ghazl El Mahalla ended his contract by mutual consent after playing only 1 season with the first team.

=== El Raja ===
In 2009, Gomma joined El Raja. He spent 2 years at the club and helped to avoid the relegation during the 2010–11 Egyptian Second Division.

=== El Mansoura ===
In 2011, Gomaa signed for El Mansoura in a 3-year contract for a fee of E£400,000. He scored his first goal in his official debut on 17 November 2011 against Baladeyet El Mahalla in a 1–2 loss in the 2011–12 Egyptian Second Division. He scored 4 goals in 7 matches in his first season, however all of the football competitions in Egypt were suspended by the Egyptian Football Association after the Port Said Stadium riot occurred. Gomma finished his second season as the club's top goalscorer, scoring 16 goals in 25 matches. He also finished as the club's top goalscorer in the next season despite scoring only 6 goals in 19 matches in a disappointing season for his side as they failed to qualify to the promotion play-offs. His last goal for El Mansoura was on 12 May 2014 against Ittihad Nabarouh in a 1–1 draw in the league.

=== Al Masry ===
On 22 July 2014, Al Masry announced the signing of Gomaa from El Mansoura in a 3-year contract for an undisclosed fee. Gomaa had a hard start with Al Masry under Tarek Yehia, who wasn't convinced with his ability. He played only 4 matches and ended up being benched during the first half of the season.

=== Loan to Ittihad El Shorta ===
On 14 January 2015, Ittihad El Shorta announced the signing of Gomaa and his teammate Eliassou Issiaka on loan until the end of the 2014–15 Egyptian Premier League season. He scored 4 goals in 20 appearances with the club. On 28 May 2015, Gomaa scored against the league winners Zamalek in a 5–1 loss. Ittihad El Shorta finished the season in the 15th place, one point above the relegation zone and 5 points below Al Masry.

== International career ==
On 29 December 2016, Gomaa was called up for the national team for the first time in his career as he was named in Egypt's preliminary squad for the 2017 Africa Cup of Nations in Gabon. However, he wasn't included in the final squad for the tournament.

In May 2018 he was named in Egypt's preliminary squad for the 2018 World Cup in Russia. He made his debut for the national team on 25 May in a friendly match against Kuwait, coming on as a substitute for Kouka early in the second half.
