= Ramy Rabie =

Egyptian footballer (born 1982)

Rami Rabie
Personal information
- Full name: Rami Rabie Hamed
- Date of birth: June 26, 1982 (age 44)
- Place of birth: Al Minufiyah, Egypt
- Height: 1.89 m (6 ft 2 1/2 in)
- Position: Forward

Team information
- Current team: Tanta (assistant)

Youth career
- Alsharqia Dukhan

Senior career*
Years	Team	Apps	(Gls)
??–2006	Alsharqia Dukhan	?	(?)
2006–2007	Al-Ahly	3	(0)
2007–2010	Mokawloon Al-Arab	38	(13)
2011	El Gouna	6	(0)
2011–2013	Ittihad Alexandria	16	(1)
2013–2014	El Minya	16	(0)
2014–2015	Aswan		

Managerial career
- 2015–2017: Aswan (sporting director)
- 2017: El Sharkia (staff)
- 2018–: Tanta (assistant)
- * Club domestic league appearances and goals

Rami Rabie (born June 26, 1982) is an Egyptian former footballer, who played as a striker. He is currently the assistant coach of Tanta SC.
