= Moataz Eno =

Egyptian footballer (born 1983)

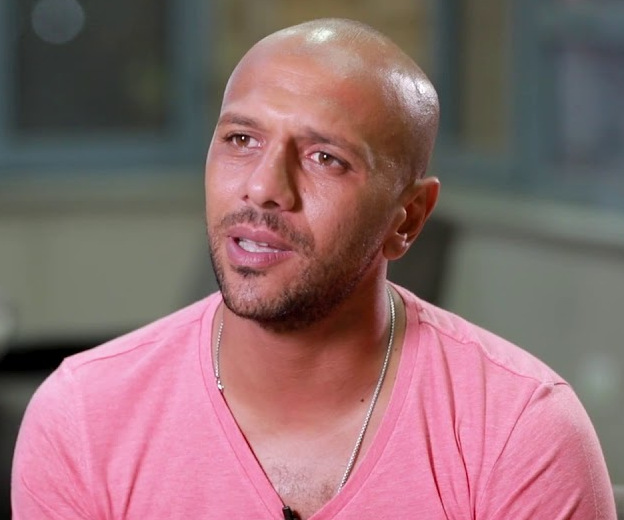

Personal information
- Full name: El-Moataz Bellah Mohamed Eno
- Date of birth: October 9, 1983 (age 43)
- Place of birth: Helwan, Egypt
- Height: 1.80 m (5 ft 11 in)
- Positions: Defensive midfielder; central defender

Youth career
- 1995–1997: El-Ahly
- 1998–2001: Zamalek SC

Senior career*
Years	Team	Apps	(Gls)
2001–2007	Zamalek SC	125	(5)
2007–2012	El-Ahly	108	(2)
2012–2012	→ Misr El Makasa (loan)	35	(0)
2012–2014	→ Haras El-Hodood SC	25	(1)
2014–2015	Al-Gaish		
2015–2016	Pharco		
2016–2017	Ras Al Khaimah		

International career^{‡}
2006–2007	Egypt	1	(0)
- * Club domestic league appearances and goals as of 03:51, 16 July 2009 (UTC) ‡ National team caps and goals as of 03:51, 16 July 2009 (UTC)

Moataz Eno (Arabic: معتز اينو; born October 9, 1983) is an Egyptian former footballer.

== Nickname ==
Moataz Eno adopted his nickname (Eno) from his father Eno who played for Al-Masry SC.

== Zamalek ==
Moataz Eno is an Ahly youth product but moved to Zamalek when he was 13 on a youth contract. He made his first appearance for Zamalek aged 21. Eno, like his father, is known for Long-Range shots.

== Al Ahly ==
In 2006, Eno's contract with Zamalek ran out and he moved as a free-agent to bitter rivals Al Ahly. In his first season, he sat on the bench for most of the season. The following season he scored against his former team Zamalek in the Egyptian Super Cup a match which ended 2–0 in the favour of Al Ahly. In the 2009/2010 season he began playing as a regular and made great performances but unfortunately he tore a cruciate ligament in the match against Petrojet.

== International career ==
Eno has made one appearance for the Egypt national football team, a friendly against Uruguay on 16 August 2006. He was named to the Egypt squad for the 2006 African Cup of Nations, but did not appear in the tournament.
