= Abdel Hamid Ahmed =

Egyptian footballer (born 1984)

Personal information
- Full name: Abdel Hamid Ahmed
- Date of birth: 3 March 1984 (age 42)
- Place of birth: Cairo, Egypt
- Position: Defender

Team information
- Current team: El Dakhleya

Senior career*
Years	Team	Apps	(Gls)
2004–2009	Wadi Degla	–	(–)
2008–2009	Al Ahly	5	(0)
2009–2011	El Gouna		
2011–	El Dakhleya		
- * Club domestic league appearances and goals

Abdel Hamid Ahmed (Arabic: عبد الحميد أحمد; born 3 March 1984) is an Egyptian footballer.

== Career ==
A left back, Ahmed currently plays at the club level for El Dakhleya.

He made his league debut with Al Ahly in a match against Tersana on 29 December 2008.
