= Mohammed Samara =

Palestinian footballer (born 1983)

Personal information
- Full name: Mohammed Ahmed Mahmoud Samara
- Date of birth: January 1, 1983 (age 43)
- Place of birth: Cairo, Egypt
- Height: 1.78 m (5 ft 10 in)
- Position: Midfielder

Team information
- Current team: Arab Contractors
- Number: 18

Youth career
- Al-Ahly

Senior career*
Years	Team	Apps	(Gls)
- Ittihad Alexandria
2004–2006	Goldi		
2006–2007	Asyut Petroleum		(3)
2007–2009	Petrojet		(7)
2009–2012	Arab Contractors		(7)
2012–2013	El Dakhleya		

International career^{‡}
2011–2013	Palestine	12	(0)
- * Club domestic league appearances and goals as of 4 October 2012 ‡ National team caps and goals as of 4 October 2012

Mohammed Samara (Arabic: محمد سمارة; born January 1, 1983) is a former footballer who played for Arab Contractors of the Egyptian Premier League. Born in Egypt, he played for the Palestine national football team. He received his first official cap in October 2007 he has since been called up for unofficial friendlies, most notably against Dynamo Moscow where he scored a penalty kick in a 1-1 draw.
