= Ehab El Masry =

Egyptian footballer (born 1985)

Ihab El-Masry
Personal information
- Full name: Ihab El-Masry
- Date of birth: 22 October 1985 (age 41)
- Place of birth: Egypt
- Height: 1.78 m (5 ft 10 in)
- Position: Second striker

Team information
- Current team: Smouha

Youth career
- Mokawloon al-Arab

Senior career*
Years	Team	Apps	(Gls)
	Mokawloon al-Arab	63	(20)
2011–	Al-Masry	24	(3)
2012–	→ Smouha (loan)		

International career^{‡}
2009–	Egypt		
- * Club domestic league appearances and goals as of 8 November 2008 ‡ National team caps and goals as of 19 November 2008

Ihab El-Masry (born 22 October 1985) is an Egyptian football striker who plays for Egyptian Premier League side Smouha Sporting Club.

El-Masry scored a brace for the Contractors during the penultimate round of the 2008–09 season. Ehab played for several Egyptian football clubs, and in July 2017, he signed a 3-year contract for Raja CA in a free transfer. He canceled the contract few days later.

== International career ==
Ihab was called into the provisional Egypt national football team for the 2009 FIFA Confederations Cup in South Africa, but he failed to secure his place in final team.
