= Mahmoud El Sayed Samir =

Egyptian footballer (born 1983)

Mahmoud Samir
Personal information
- Full name: Mahmoud El-Sayed Samir
- Date of birth: 13 January 1983 (age 43)
- Place of birth: Cairo, Egypt
- Height: 1.78 m (5 ft 10 in)
- Positions: Attacking midfielder; second striker

Team information
- Current team: Ittihad El-Shorta
- Number: 32

Youth career
- Tersana

Senior career*
Years	Team	Apps	(Gls)
2003–2008	Tersana	?	(?)
2008–2009	Al Ahly	11	(1)
2009	→ Itesalat (loan)	6	(1)
2009–2010	El-Masry	0	(0)
2010–2011	Al-Ittihad Al-Sakndary	1	(0)
2011–2014	El Dakhleya		
2014–?	Ittihad El-Shorta		

International career^{‡}
- Egypt
- * Club domestic league appearances and goals as of 16 February 2008 ‡ National team caps and goals as of 24 June 2008

Mahmoud Samir (Arabic: محمود سمير) is an Egyptian footballer who plays for the Egyptian team El Dakhleya.

He scored his debut goal with Al Ahly against ASEC Mimosas in CAF Champions League 2008.
