= Ibrahim El-Shayeb =

Egyptian footballer (born 1984)

Personal information
- Date of birth: April 26, 1984 (age 42)
- Place of birth: Egypt
- Position: Midfielder

Team information
- Current team: El-Ittihad
- Number: 6

Senior career*
Years	Team	Apps	(Gls)
2003–2006	El-Ittihad		
2006–2009	ENPPI		
2008	→El Geish (loan)		
2009	→El-Ittihad (loan)		
2009–?	El-Ittihad		
- Mokaweloon

International career
- Egypt
- * Club domestic league appearances and goals

Ibrahim El-Shayeb (Arabic: إبراهيم الشايب) (born on April 26, 1984) is an Egyptian football midfielder who plays for El-Ittihad. As of 2016, he is the team captain.
