= Ahmed Hassan Farag =

Egyptian footballer (born 1982)

Ahmed Hassan
Personal information
- Full name: Ahmed Hassan Farag
- Date of birth: June 9, 1982 (age 44)
- Place of birth: Egypt
- Position: Striker

Youth career
- Beni Suef

Senior career*
Years	Team	Apps	(Gls)
2002–2004	Beni Suef		
2004–2005	Al-Tahaddi Benghazi		
2005–2006	Al Aluminium Nag Hammâdi		
2006–2008	Ghazl El-Mahalla	?	(?)
2008–2009	Al Ahly	4	(1)
2009–2010	Ittihad El Shorta	0	(0)
2010	→ Ghazl El-Mahalla (loan)		
2010–2013	El Gouna		
2013	Telephonat Beni Suef		
2014–2015	Ghazl El-Mahalla		
2015–2016	El Gouna		

International career^{‡}
2006–2008	Egypt	4	(0)
- * Club domestic league appearances and goals as of 2:53, 24 February 2026 (UTC) ‡ National team caps and goals as of 21:53, 16 July 2007 (UTC)

Ahmed Hassan Farag (Arabic: أحمد حسن فرج; born 9 June 1982) is an Egyptian footballer, who plays in the position of a striker. In January 2010, he signed a 6-month loan deal with Ghazl El-Mehalla.
