= Ahmed Ali (footballer, born 1988) =

Egyptian footballer

Personal information
- Full name: Ahmed Ali Mohamed Abdel Aziz
- Date of birth: 8 August 1988 (age 38)
- Place of birth: El Mansoura, El Dakahlia, Egypt
- Position: Right-back

Team information
- Current team: El Gouna
- Number: 12

Youth career
- El Mansoura

Senior career*
| Years | Team | Apps | (Gls) |
| 2003–2008 | El Mansoura | | |
| 2008–2012 | Al Ahly | 29 | (0) |
| 2010–2011 | → Al Ittihad (loan) | 2 | (0) |
| 2011–2012 | → Ittihad El Shorta (loan) | 6 | (0) |
| 2012–2014 | Misr Lel Makkasa | 18 | (0) |
| 2014–2018 | Al Mokawloon | 110 | (3) |
| 2018– | El Gouna | 12 | (1) |
- * Club domestic league appearances and goals as of 18:56, 5 December 2018 (UTC)

Ahmed Ali (Arabic: أحمد علي; born 8 August 1988), is an Egyptian footballer who plays for Egyptian Premier League side El Gouna as a right-back.

== Career ==
Ali began his career at local club El Mansoura and made his debut at the age of 17, playing as a right back, right midfielder and also a right winger. During the summer of 2008, Ali joined Egyptian giants Al Ahly and spent 4 years at the club with two of them being on loan at Al Ittihad and Ittihad El Shorta. After finding no place in Al Ahly's squad, he joined another Egyptian Premier League side Misr Lel Makkasa in 2012 and spent two years with the club, appearing in 18 league matches only.

In 2014, before the start of the 2014–15 Egyptian Premier League season, Ali joined Al Mokawloon. He spent 4 seasons with the club and played 115 matches in all competitions, making him one of the longest serving players for the club since their promotion from the Egyptian Second Division in 2005.

On 31 May 2018, after his contract with Al Mokawloon ended, Ali joined newly promoted side El Gouna on a free transfer.
