= Carlos Alberto Cabral =

Carlos Alberto Cabral (1895–1968) was the 2nd count of Vizela and the original owner of Casa de Serralves, Porto, Portugal. He enlisted the work of many famous French architects, decorators, and landscape architects of the time to create both the house and the gardens of Serralves.
