= Ahmed Raouf =

Egyptian footballer (born 1982)

Personal information
- Full name: Ahmed Raouf Mohamed Adam
- Date of birth: 15 September 1982 (age 44)
- Place of birth: Cairo, Egypt
- Height: 1.76 m (5 ft 9 in)
- Position: Forward

Senior career*
| Years | Team | Apps | (Gls) |
| 2000–2003 | El Minya | | |
| 2003–2008 | El Qanah | | |
| 2008–2013 | ENPPI | 100 | (29) |
| 2013–2013 | → Al-Ittihad (loan) | 0 | |
| 2014–2014 | Al Ahly | 17 | (2) |
| 2014–2016 | Al-Masry | 83 | (31) |
| 2016–2017 | Smouha | 31 | (9) |
| 2017–2018 | Wadi Degla | 26 | (2) |
| 2018–2019 | Petrojet | 14 | (1) |
| 2019–2019 | Entag El Harby | 5 | (0) |
| 2019–2020 | Petrojet | | |

International career
| 2008–2016 | Egypt | 13 | (1) |
- * Club domestic league appearances and goals

Ahmed Raouf Mohamed Adam (Arabic: أَحْمَد رَؤُوف مُحَمَّد آدَم; born 15 September 1982) is an Egyptian former professional footballer who played as a forward.

Raouf was included in the Egypt national team that participated in 2009 FIFA Confederations Cup and won the 2010 Africa Cup of Nations. He played 13 matches for the national team, including five matches in FIFA World Cup 2010 Qualifiers.

== Honours ==
- Winner of African Cup of Nations Angola 2010
- Winner of Egypt Cup (2011) playing for ENPPI
