= Alaa Shaaban =

Egyptian footballer (born 1989)

Alaa Shaaban (born 21 August 1989) is an Egyptian professional footballer who plays as midfielder. He transferred to Al Ahly from Al Hamam Football Club in 2009.
