= Ramy Adel =

Egyptian footballer (born 1979)

Personal information
- Full name: Ramy Mohamed Adel Mohamed Shawatta
- Date of birth: August 18, 1979 (age 47)
- Place of birth: Cairo, Egypt
- Height: 1.85 m (6 ft 1 in)
- Position: Center-back

Youth career
- Al-Mokawloon al-Arab

Senior career*
Years	Team	Apps	(Gls)
1999–2005	Al-Mokawloon Al-Arab	??	(?)
2005–2009	Al Ahly	??	(?)
2006–2007	→ Al-Mokawloon Al-Arab (loan)	??	(?)
2007–2008	→ El-Masry (loan)	14	(0)
2009–2011	El Gouna	39	(2)
2011–2013	Smouha	6	(0)
2013–2015	Ittihad	30	(4)
2015–2018	Al-Mokawloon	0	(0)

International career
2004–2006	Egypt	6	(0)
- * Club domestic league appearances and goals

Ramy Mohamed Adel Mohamed Shawatta (Arabic: رامي عادل) (born August 18, 1979) is an Egyptian footballer, who currently plays as a center-back for Egyptian Premier League club Al-Mokawloon al-Arab.

== Club career ==
Ramy started his career at the youth squad of Al-Mokawloon al-Arab, before he signed to top Egyptian club Al Ahly in summer 2005. In 2006, he rejoined Al-Mokawloon al-Arab for a one-year loan.

He returned to Al Ahly after the end of his loan spell. He was loaned again in season 2008-09 for El-Masry club, after disagreements with Al Ahly's coach then Manuel Jose due to being constantly overlooked for a starting spot.

In summer 2009 and after being released from Al Ahly club, Ramy signed a contract to play for the newly promoted to Egyptian Premier League El Gouna club.
