= Osama Hosny =

Egyptian footballer (born 1982)

Personal information
- Full name: Osama Hosny Lotfy Abdel Sattar
- Date of birth: June 18, 1982 (age 44)
- Place of birth: Sharkia, Egypt
- Height: 1.74 m (5 ft 9 in)
- Position: Forward

Youth career
- 1996–2002: Al Ahly

Senior career*
Years	Team	Apps	(Gls)
2000–2011	Al Ahly	113	(39)
2011–2013	Misr El Makasa	30	(15)
2013–2014	Haras El Hodood	8	(0)

International career^{‡}
2004–2007	Egypt	11	(3)
- * Club domestic league appearances and goals as of 1 July 2015 ‡ National team caps and goals as of 2 May 2015 (UTC)

Osama Hosny Lotfy Abdel Sattar (Arabic: أُسَامَة حَسَنِيّ لُطْفِيّ عَبْد السَّتَّار; born June 18, 1982) is a retired Egyptian footballer. He played the forward position for Egypt's African Super Cup Championship club Al Ahly. An Egyptian international but missed out on the 2006 African Cup of Nations in Egypt through injury.

== Club career ==
He was a fine attacking striker who was a regular goal scorer for the African champions and played a major part in their CAF Champions League 2005 triumph scoring 3 goals. He scored 3 goals again in CAF Champions League 2006 helping Al Ahly to defend his title.

Osama has a great ability to score from any place, especially with his goal finding abilities. He scored 5 goals in one game against Koroum in the Egyptian League (2003–2004). He was the vice-captain of Al-Ahly team.

He transferred to Misr El Makasa club in summer 2011. On 15 September 2014, he announced his retirement from football.

== Memorable shots ==
- An accurate header in the CAF Champions League 2005 final against Etoile Sportive du Sahel of Tunisia in Egypt's Military Academy Stadium. The game ended 3–0 for Al Ahly winning the Cup.
- Two important goals in Cairo against Enyimba of Nigeria, in the group stage of CAF Champions League 2005, giving Al Ahly the 3 points of the watch with a win 2–1.
- Scored Twice in Egyptian Soccer Cup Final 2007 Against El-Zamalek when he substituted in last five minutes in the Extra time, giving Al-Ahly the cup with a win 4–3.

== Honours ==
=== Club ===
Al Ahly:

- Egyptian Premier League (8): 1999–2000, 2004–2005, 2005–2006, 2006–2007, 2007–2008, 2008–2009, 2009–2010, 2010–2011
- Egypt Cup (4): 2001, 2003, 2006, 2007
- Egyptian Super Cup (6): 2003, 2005, 2006, 2007, 2008, 2010
- CAF Champions League (4): 2001, 2005, 2006, 2008
- African Super Cup (4): 2002, 2006, 2007, 2009
- FIFA Club World Cup 2006: 3rd place
