= Ahmad Sedik =

Egyptian footballer (born 1983)

Ahmad Seddik
Personal information
- Full name: Ahmad Seddik Abdelhamid Mahdy
- Date of birth: August 16, 1983 (age 43)
- Place of birth: Al Fayyum, Egypt
- Height: 1.69 m (5 ft 7 in)
- Positions: Right wing back; midfielder

Youth career
- 2003: Al Ahly

Senior career*
Years	Team	Apps	(Gls)
2003–2006	Assiut Cement	5	(0)
2006–2009	Al Ahly	54	(2)
2009–2012	Ismaily	68	(6)
2012–2013	Al Ahly	5	(0)
2013–2014	Al-Ittihad Al-Sakndary	6	(0)
2014–2016	El Dakhleya	44	(3)
2016–2017	Haras El Hodoud		
2017–2018	Nogoom		

International career^{‡}
- Egypt
- * Club domestic league appearances and goals as of 1 July 2018 ‡ National team caps and goals as of 1 July 2018

Ahmad Seddik Abdelhamid Mahdy (Arabic: أَحْمَد صِدِّيق عَبْد الْحَمِيد مَهْدِيّ; born August 16, 1983) is an Egyptian footballer. He is a very fast retired midfielder. He is a strong shooter.

He is not a regular in Al Ahly, but he took his advantage against Algerian JS Kabylie in his first African match, and displayed his evident class with a beautifully judged first-half free kick that represented his first goal for the club. Then, his shot just before half-time hit the upright but fell perfectly for Osama Hosny to make sure of the 2–0 triumph. This triumph was in the absence of injury victims Mohamed Aboutreika and Mohamed Barakat. This match writes the first line in Sedik's history, as it helped Al Ahly to retain its title and win CAF Champions League 2006. "1"

== Honours ==
Al-Ahly

- Bronze Medalist at FIFA Club World Cup 2006.
- Winner of African Super Cup (2007).
- Winner of African Super Cup (2009).
- Winner of CAF Champions League 2006.
- Winner of CAF Champions League 2008.
- Winner of Egyptian League (2006–2007).
- Winner of Egyptian League (2007–2008).
- Winner of Egyptian League (2008–2009).
- Winner of Egyptian Super Cup (2006).
- Winner of Egyptian Soccer Cup (2007).
- Winner of Egyptian Super Cup (2008).
