= Hussein Ali (footballer, born 1982) =

Egyptian football centre midfielder

Personal information
- Full name: Hussein Ali Hassan Moustafa
- Date of birth: 19 March 1982 (age 44)
- Place of birth: Egypt
- Height: 1.70 m (5 ft 7 in)
- Position: Centre midfielder

Team information
- Current team: ENPPI
- Number: 27

Youth career
- Al Ahly

Senior career*
Years	Team	Apps	(Gls)
–2008	Petrojet		
2008–2009	Al Ahly		
2009–2011	Gouna	25	(1)
2011–	ENPPI	5	(0)

International career^{‡}
- Egypt U17
- Egypt U20
- Egypt
- * Club domestic league appearances and goals ‡ National team caps and goals as of 03:49, 16 March 2021 (UTC)

Hussein Ali Hassan Moustafa (Arabic: حسين علي حسن مصطفى; born 19 March 1982) is an Egyptian professional footballer who plays as a centre midfielder for Egyptian Premier League club ENPPI.
