= Al Masry SC =

Association football club in Port Said, Egypt

Al-Masry
- Full name: Al Masry Sporting Club
- Nicknames: Boss of the Canal (Zaeem Al Qanāh); The Green Eagles (El Nosour El Khodr); The Pharaonic Horus
- Short name: MAS, MSC
- Founded: 18 March 1920; 106 years ago
- Ground: Al Masry Club Stadium
- Capacity: 18,000
- Chairman: Kamel Abou Ali
- Coach: Nabil Kouki
- League: Egyptian Premier League
- 2025–26: Egyptian Premier League, 5th
Home colours	Away colours

Al-Masry Sporting Club (Arabic: النادي المصري للألعاب الرياضية) is an Egyptian sports club based in Port Said, Egypt. The club is mainly known for its professional football team that competes in the Egyptian Premier League, the highest tier of the Egyptian football league system.

Al-Masry has never won the league, but won their one Egyptian Cup in 1998. The club used to play their home matches at the Port Said Stadium, with a capacity of 17,988.

== History ==
=== Establishment and Early years ===
Founded on 18 March 1920 by a group of Egyptians in Port Said, it was the first club for Egyptians in a Cosmoplitan city that already had many clubs for the foreign communities living there. The idea of creating a club for Egyptians was one of the manifestations of the 1919 Egyptian revolution against the British occupation. The first board of directors of the club was headed by Ahmed Hosni, Secretary General of the Municipal Council in Port Said. The board of directors comprised a group of Egyptians from the city’s notables, without any foreign member. It was taken into account that the formation of the board of directors reflected the representation of all Egyptians, both Muslims and Christians, to emphasize the nature of the club as a gathering entity for all spectrums of national identity, and the founding fathers of the club chose “Al Masry” which means in "The Egyptian" as a name for the club to emphasize this idea.

The founding members of Al Masry inspired the club's name from the famous national song Oum Ya Masry "Arise Egyptian" of Sayed Darwish. They also derived the color of Al Masry's green jersey from the green Flag of Egypt that the revolutionaries raised during the 1919 revolution for the first time. Al Masry began its activities by playing against Egyptian and foreign teams in the Canal region, the matches against foreign teams was full of enthusiasm that led to the increase of Al Masry's popularity to be the most popular team in Port Said. The club also contributed with some other Egyptian clubs to the establishment of the Egyptian Football Association in 1921.

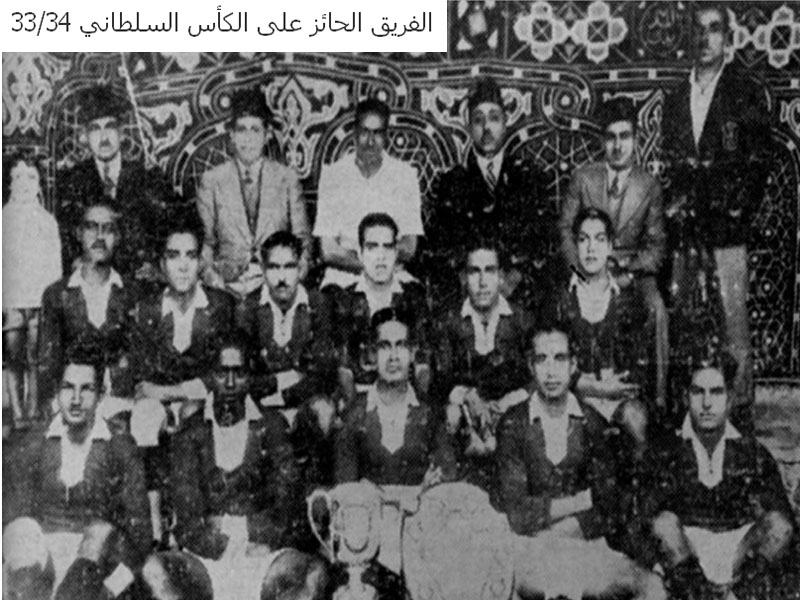
Al Masry team, winners of Sultan Hussein Cup in 1934

In February 2012 the Port Said Stadium disaster took place, where rioting Masry fans caused the deaths of 72 rival fans, and hundreds of injuries. 69 Masry fans were convicted, with 26 receiving the death penalty, and numerous others receiving life sentences.

After the riots, the remainder of the 2011–12 Egyptian Premier League season was cancelled by the Egyptian Football Association. Al Masry decided to refrain from competing in the 2012–13 season as a sign of respect to the relatives of the victims of the disaster, although it obtained a decision from the Court of Arbitration for Sport (CAS) confirming the club's right to participate in the Egyptian Premier League and all other activities of the Egyptian Football Association. Nevertheless, 2012–13 season was not completed and was cancelled due to the political situation in Egypt.

Al Masry resumed participation in the Egyptian Premier League in the 2013–14 season; the club suffered from inconsistent performance and results for two consecutive seasons, although it maintained its position in the Egyptian Premier League. Al Masry started the 2015–16 season under the coaching of the Egyptian former player of the team Hossam Hassan, who adopted a new policy depending on youth and unknown players. That season the team came in at fourth place in the Egyptian Premier League and succeeded to qualify to the CAF Confederation Cup after 14 years of absence from African completions.

== Colours and crest ==
The Egyptian flag (1922–1958).

Al Masry's crest is composed of a green pharaonic Horus eagle that holds the Sun disk over its head in between its two upraised wings; the crest was inspired by the shape of Tutankhamun's pendants referring to challenge and strength, so the team is nicknamed the green eagles. The club's main colours, green and white come from Egypt's flag after the Egyptian Revolution of 1919 as a symbol of patriotism.

== Stadiums ==
Al Masry formerly played their home games at a small stadium in Port Said, but its capacity was too small for the club's support. As a consequence, Al Masry built its own new stadium which is named Al Masry Club Stadium in 1953 and was officially inaugurated in 1955.

=== Sayed Metwally Complex ===
Sayed Metwally Complex
- Location: Port Said, Egypt
- Owner: Al Masry SC
- Operator: Al Masry SC
- Capacity: No Seats
- Surface: Grass

Construction
- Renovated: 2011

Tenants
- Al Masry SC; Al Masry Juniors and all other youth levels

The Sayed Metwally Complex is the training center of Egyptian multi-sport club Al Masry SC. It has two grass pitches and is mainly used by the senior squad and the youth teams. It was renovated in 2011 to be ready to host the training sessions of the first team and its friendly matches. In November 2013 Al Masry board of directors took a decision to name the pitches after the club's late president Sayed Metwally who remained in the office for almost 26 years.

== Presidents ==
Name	From	To
(Egypt) / (Egypt) Sir Ahmed Hosny	1920	1925
(Egypt) Mohamed El-Tobshy	1925	1930
(Egypt) Sir Awad Fakosa	1930	1935
(Egypt) Ibrahim Youssef Lehita	1935	1940
(Egypt) / (Egypt) / (Egypt) Abd El Rahman Pasha Lotfi	1940	1964
(Egypt) Major General Khalil Tarman	1964	1967
(Egypt) / (Egypt) Abd El Hamid Hussien	1971	1974
(Egypt) Mohamed Moussa	1974	1978
(Egypt) Ahmed Fouad El-Makhzangy	Feb 1978	Dec 1979
(Egypt) Major General Ibrahim El-Mor	May 1980	Aug 1980
(Egypt) / (Egypt) Sayed Metwaly	1980	1988
(Egypt) Major General Ibrahim El-Mor	1988	1989
(Egypt) Sayed Metwaly	1989	1991
(Egypt) Adel El-Gazar	March 1991	May 1991
(Egypt) Sayed Metwaly	1991	1997
(Egypt) Kamel Abou-Aly	Aug 1997	Dec 1997
(Egypt) Abd El wahab Kouta	Jan 1998	2002
(Egypt) Sayed Metwaly	Sept 2002	2008
(Egypt) Aly Fragallah	2008	2009
(Egypt) Kamel Abou-Aly	2009	2013
(Egypt) Yasser Yehia	2014	July 2015
(Egypt) Samir Halabia	23 July 2015	2022
(Egypt) Kamel Abou-Aly	2022	Present

== Honours ==
- Egypt Cup
  - Winners (1): 1997–98
  - Runners-up (9): 1926–27, 1944–45, 1946–47, 1953–54, 1956–57, 1982–83, 1983–84, 1988–89, 2016–17
- Sultan Hussein Cup
  - Winners (3): 1932–33, 1933–34, 1936–37
  - Runners-up (1): 1937–38
- Egyptian Confederation Cup
  - Winners (1): 1992 (shared record)
  - Runners-up (1): 1989
- Egyptian League Cup
  - Winners (1): 2025–26
  - Runners-up (1): 2022–23
- Canal Zone League
  - Winners (17): 1932, 1933, 1934, 1935, 1936, 1937, 1938, 1939, 1940, 1941, 1942, 1943, 1944, 1945, 1946, 1947, 1948 (record)

== Performance in CAF competitions ==
- PR = Preliminary round
- FR = First round
- SR = Second round
- PO = Play-off round
- QF = Quarter-final
- SF = Semi-final

Season	Competition	Round	Country	Club	Home	Away	Aggregate
1999	African Cup Winners' Cup	FR	Sudan	Al Merrikh	1–0	0–1	1–1 (4–3 p)
1999	African Cup Winners' Cup	SR	Ghana	Asante Kotoko	1–0	0–1	1–1 (4–2 p)
1999	African Cup Winners' Cup	QF	DR Congo	AS Dragons	3–0	0–1	3–1
1999	African Cup Winners' Cup	SF	Tunisia	Club Africain	0–4	0–0	0–4
2002	CAF Cup	FR	Kenya	Mathare United	2–0	2–0	4–0
2002	CAF Cup	SR	Botswana	Botswana Defence Force XI	2–0	2–4	4–4 (a)
2002	CAF Cup	QF	Madagascar	AS Adema	2–0	1–0	3–0
2002	CAF Cup	SF	Algeria	JS Kabylie	1–0	0–2	1–2
2017	CAF Confederation Cup	PR	Nigeria	Ifeanyi Ubah	1–0	0–1	1–1 (3–0 p)
2017	CAF Confederation Cup	FR	Mali	Djoliba	w/o	0–2	w/o (Note: FIFA suspended the Malian Football Federation on 17 March 2017. As a result, Djoliba could not play the second leg, and Al Masry won on walkover.)
2017	CAF Confederation Cup	PO	Uganda	KCCA	1–0	0–1	1–1 (3–4 p)
2018	CAF Confederation Cup	PR	Zambia	Green Buffaloes	4–0	1–2	5–2
2018	CAF Confederation Cup	FR	Tanzania	Simba	0–0	2–2	2–2 (a)
2018	CAF Confederation Cup	PO	Gabon	CF Mounana	2–1	1–1	3–2
2018	CAF Confederation Cup	Group B	Mozambique	UD Songo	2–0	1–1	2nd
2018	CAF Confederation Cup	Group B	Sudan	Al Hilal	2–0	1–1	2nd
2018	CAF Confederation Cup	Group B	Morocco	RS Berkane	1–0	0–0	2nd
2018	CAF Confederation Cup	QF	Algeria	USM Alger	1–0	1–0	2–0
2018	CAF Confederation Cup	SF	DR Congo	AS Vita Club	0–0	0–4	0–4
2018–19	CAF Confederation Cup	FR	Burkina Faso	Salitas	0–2	0–0	0–2
2019–20	CAF Confederation Cup	FR	Zanzibar	Malindi	3–1	4–1	7–2
2019–20	CAF Confederation Cup	PO	Seychelles	Côte d'Or	2–0	4–0	6–0
2019–20	CAF Confederation Cup	Group A	Mauritania	FC Nouadhibou	1–0	3–2	2nd
2019–20	CAF Confederation Cup	Group A	Nigeria	Enugu Rangers	4–2	1–1	2nd
2019–20	CAF Confederation Cup	Group A	Egypt	Pyramids	1–2	0–2	2nd
2019–20	CAF Confederation Cup	QF	Morocco	RS Berkane	2–2	0–1	2–3
2021–22	CAF Confederation Cup	SR	Uganda	URA	1–0	0–0	1–0
2021–22	CAF Confederation Cup	PO	Nigeria	Rivers United	1–0	1–2	2–2 (a)
2021–22	CAF Confederation Cup	Group C	DR Congo	TP Mazembe	2–0	0–2	2nd
2021–22	CAF Confederation Cup	Group C	Cameroon	Coton Sport	2–0	0–0	2nd
2021–22	CAF Confederation Cup	Group C	Congo	AS Otohô	1–0	0–1	2nd
2021–22	CAF Confederation Cup	QF	Morocco	RS Berkane	2–1	0–1	2–2 (a)

== Performance in Arab competitions ==
- Arab Cup Winners' Cup: 1 appearance

1999 – Bronze Medalist

- Arab Champions League: 1 appearance

2008 – First Round

== IFFHS rankings ==
=== Club world ranking ===
These are the footballdatabase club's points 3 June 2018.

Pos.	Team	Points
381	(Ecuador) El Nacional	1458
382	(Romania) Viitorul Constanţa	1458
383	(Egypt) Al Masry SC	1457
384	(Honduras) Motagua	1457
385	(Russia) FC Ufa	1457

These are the footballdatabase club's points 3 June 2018.

Pos.	Team	Points
21	(Tunisia) Club Africain	1467
22	(Mali) Djoliba AC	1463
23	(Egypt) Al Masry SC	1457
24	(South Africa) Orlando Pirates	1438
25	(Democratic Republic of the Congo) DC Motema Pembe	1437

=== National club rankings ===
These are the footballdatabase club's points 3 June 2018.

Pos.	Team	Points
2	(Egypt) Zamalek	1487
3	(Egypt) Ismaily	1483
4	(Egypt) Al Masry	1457
5	(Egypt) Smouha	1415
6	(Egypt) Misr Lel Makkasa	1413

== Players ==
=== Current squad ===
As of 17 August 2026

Note: Flags indicate national team as defined under FIFA eligibility rules; some limited exceptions apply. Players may hold more than one non-FIFA nationality.

No.	Pos.	Nation	Player
1	GK	EGY	Essam Tharwat
2	DF	EGY	Baher El Mohamady
3	DF	EGY	Mohamed Shokry
4	MF	EGY	Yassin El Mallah
5	DF	EGY	Khaled Sobhi
6	MF	EGY	Mohamed Makhlouf
7	DF	EGY	Karim El Eraki
8	MF	EGY	Hassan Ali
9	FW	EGY	Salah Mohsen
10	FW	EGY	Karim Bambo
11	FW	EGY	Mohammed Al Shamy
12	MF	EGY	Mostafa Aboul-Kheir
13	DF	EGY	Amr El Saadawy
14	MF	EGY	Mahmoud Hamada
15	MF	EGY	Ahmed El Armouty
16	GK	EGY	Mahmoud Hamdy
17	MF	EGY	Youssef El Gohary

No.	Pos.	Nation	Player
18	MF	PLE	Ameed Sawafta
20	MF	ALG	Kheireddine Toual
24	MF	PLE	Moustafa Zeidan
25	FW	ALG	Mounder Temine
26	GK	EGY	Mohamed Seha
27	FW	MAR	Abdellah Ziani
29	DF	EGY	Mohamed Hashem
30	MF	ALG	Abderrahim Deghmoum
31	GK	EGY	Mohamed Shehata
33	DF	EGY	Mostafa El Aash
34	FW	EGY	Hossam Hassan
36	DF	EGY	Abdo Nader
37	FW	EGY	Ahmed Ashraf
39	GK	EGY	Ahmed Wahp
—	FW	ERI	Ali Sulieman

== Coaching staff ==
Position	Staff
Manager	(Egypt) Ali Maher
General Coach	(Egypt) Mohammed Abdul-Kareem
Assistant coach	(Egypt) Saif Dawood
Goalkeeper Coach	(Egypt) Mostafa Fathi
Football Director	(Egypt) Vacant
Administrator	(Egypt) Mahmoud Gaber
Club Doctor	(Egypt)
Physiotherapist	(Egypt) Ahmed Sameh
Masseur	(Egypt) Yousry Sadek
Masseur	(Egypt) Hussien Hassan
Masseur	(Egypt) Mohamed Ayad

== Captains ==
- 01- (Egypt) Ali Mabrouk
- 02- (Egypt) Hassan Al-Deeb
- 03- (Egypt) Helmi Mostafa
- 04- (Egypt) Abdulrahman Fawzi
- 05- (Egypt) Mohammed Hassan
- 06- (Egypt) Mohammed Gouda
- 07- (Egypt) Hamdeen Al-Zamek
- 08- (Egypt) Aly Helal
- 09- (Egypt) El-Sayed El-Tabei
- 10- (Egypt) El-Sayed Ali
- 11- (Egypt) Munir Gerges (Al-lewy)
- 12- (Egypt) Adel Al-Gazar
- 13- (Egypt) Mohamed Shahen
- 14- (Egypt) Aboud El Khodary
- 15- (Egypt) Mosaad Nour
- 16- (Egypt) Tarek Soliman
- 17- (Egypt) Mostafa Abu-Dahab
- 18- (Egypt) El-Sayed Eid
- 19- (Egypt) Ali Al-Said
- 20- (Egypt) Talaat Mansour
- 21- (Egypt) Ibrahim El-Masry
- 22- (Egypt) Mohamed Omar (Al-Ako)
- 23- (Egypt) Amr Al-Desoky
- 24- (Egypt) Abdallah Ragab
- 25- (Egypt) Hossam Hassan
- 26- (Egypt) Karim Zekri
- 27- (Egypt) Mohamed Gouda
- 28- (Egypt) Mohamed Ashour El-Adham
- 29- (Ghana) Akwety Mensah
- 30- (Egypt) Amr Al-Desoky
- 31- (Egypt) Mohamed Ashour El-Adham
- 32- (Egypt) Osama Azab
- 33- (Egypt) Ahmed Fawzi
- 34- (Egypt) Karim Zekri
- 35- (Egypt) Mohamed Ashour El-Adham
- 36- (Egypt) Osama Azab
- 37- (Egypt) Islam Salah

== Managers ==
- (Egypt) Mahmoud El-Gohary
- (Hungary) Ferenc Puskás (1979–82)
- (Poland) Wojciech Łazarek (1 July 1992 – 30 June 1993)
- (Egypt) Ahmed Rifaat (9 July 1996 – 26 Oct 1996)
- (Germany) Michael Krüger (1 Jan 1998 – 31 Oct 1998)
- (Egypt) Mohsen Saleh (12 Oct 1998 – 10 Dec 1998)
- (Croatia) Zlatko Kranjčar (1 Feb 1999 – 30 June 2000)
- (Egypt) Mahmoud Abou-Regaila (1 Aug 2000 – 26 Nov 2001)
- (Egypt) Abdul-Aziz Abdul-Shafi (27 Nov 2001 – 1 July 2002)
- (Egypt) Tarek Soliman (9 Dec 2001 – 28 Jan 2002)
- (Bosnia and Herzegovina) Fuad Muzurović (1 July 2002 – 30 Dec 2002)
- (Egypt) Farouk Gaafar (1 July 2004 – 1 Dec 2004)
- (Germany) Otto Pfister (1 July 2005 – Sept 22, 2005)
- (Romania) Alexandru Moldovan (Aug 2006 – Sept 06)
- (Egypt) Mohamed Omar (Sept 28, 2006–07)
- (Egypt) Tarek Soliman (interim) (1 April 2007 – 30 June 2007)
- (Egypt) Helmy Toulan (1 July 2007 – 1 Nov 2007)
- (Egypt) Hossam Hassan (29 Feb 2008 – 28 Dec 2008)
- (Egypt) Tarek Soliman (interim) (28 Dec 2008 – 11 Feb 2009)
- (Hungary) Bertalan Bicskei (11 Feb 2009 – 29 Aug 2009)
- (Egypt) Anwar Salama (29 Aug 2009 – 24 Jan 2010)
- (Germany) Theo Bücker (29 Jan 2010 – 4 May 2010)
- (Egypt) Mohammed Helmy (4 May 2010 – 26 May 2010)
- (Egypt) Mokhtar Mokhtar (1 June 2010 – 26 Nov 2010)
- (Egypt) Alaa Mayhoob (interim) (27 Nov 2010 – 16 Dec 2010)
- (Switzerland) Alain Geiger (16 Dec 2010 – 6 April 2011)
- (Egypt) Tarek El Sawy (6 April 2011 – 4 May 2011)
- (Egypt) Taha Basry (4 May 2011 – 13 July 2011)
- (Egypt) Talaat Youssef (17 July 2011 – 15 Jan 2012)
- (Egypt) Hossam Hassan (15 Jan 2012 – 13 May)
- (Egypt) Sabry El-Menyawy (18 Aug 2013 – 21 Jan 2014)
- (Egypt) Anwar Salama (22 Jan 2014 – 14 May 2014)
- (Egypt) Tarek Soliman (interim) (14 May 2014 – 13 July 2014)
- (Egypt) Tarek Yehia (13 July 2014 – 16 Dec 2014)
- (Spain) Juan José Maqueda (20 Dec 2014 – 28 Apr 2015)
- (Egypt) Mokhtar Mokhtar (28 Apr 2015 – 24 July 2015)
- (Egypt) Hossam Hassan (25 July 2015 – 28 October 2018)
- (Egypt) Ehab Galal (15 December 2018 – 20 February 2020)
- (Egypt) Tarek El Ashry (20 February 2020 – 31 August 2020)
- (Egypt) Ali Maher (31 August 2020 – 3 September 2021)
- (Tunisia) Moïne Chaâbani (12 September 2021 – 29 May 2022)
- (Egypt) Hossam Hassan (29 May 2022 – 31 August 2022)
- (Egypt) Ehab Galal (8 September 2022 – 3 December 2022)
- (Egypt) Hossam Hassan (14 December 2022 – 7 May 2023)
- (Egypt) Mimi Abdelrazek (7 May 2023 – 23 July 2023)
- (Egypt) Ali Maher (27 July 2023 – )

== Other sports ==
Al Masry SC also competes in other sports, such as handball, athletics, swimming, gymnastics, billiards, table tennis and field hockey.

== Al Masry FM Radio ==
Al Masry FM is the official radio station of the club; it was launched as an Internet radio station on 28 December, making it Egypt's first radio station belonging to a club.

== Sponsors ==
- Adidas
- NG9 Holding

== See also ==
- Egyptian Premier League
- Egypt Cup
- Sultan Hussein Cup
