= 2010–11 Zamalek SC season =

Zamalek
2010–11 season
- Chairman: (Egypt) Galal Ibrahim
- Manager: (Egypt) Hossam Hassan/ Hassan Shehata
- Egyptian Premier League: 2nd
- Egypt Cup: 2nd
- 2011 CAF Champions League: Round of 32
Home colours	Away colours

The 2010–11 Zamalek SC season is a special season for Zamalek's fans, who will be celebrating the 100th year of their club and hoping to achieve a championship title since winning Egypt Cup competition in 2008. It is also the second season for the Egyptian manager Hossam Hassan, who managed to improve the team's performance in the previous season ending up the Premier League a runner-up. Zamalek will be also sharing in the 2011 CAF Champions League and will be looking to add a sixth title.

== Current squad ==
Note: Flags indicate national team as defined under FIFA eligibility rules; some limited exceptions apply. Players may hold more than one non-FIFA nationality.

No.	Pos.	Nation	Player
2	DF	EGY	Amr El-Safty
3	DF	EGY	Sabry Raheel
4	DF	GHA	Rahim Ayew
5	MF	EGY	Ibrahim Salah
6	DF	EGY	Hany Said
7	DF	EGY	Ahmed Ghanem Soltan
8	MF	EGY	Hassan Mostafa
9	FW	EGY	Amr Zaki
10	MF	EGY	Shikabala (vice-captain)
11	FW	EGY	Ahmed Gaafar
12	MF	EGY	Wajih Abdel-Azim
13	DF	EGY	Mohamed Abdel-Shafy

No.	Pos.	Nation	Player
14	MF	QAT	Hussein Yasser *
15	DF	EGY	Mohamed Younis
16	GK	EGY	Abdel Wahed El-Sayed (captain)
17	MF	EGY	Alaa Ali
18	DF	EGY	Hazem Emam
19	FW	CIV	Abou Kone
20	DF	EGY	Mahmoud Fathallah
22	MF	EGY	Ashour El-Adham
25	FW	IRQ	Emad Mohammed
—	FW	EGY	Mohamed Nagy "Geddo"

* Despite the fact that he is registered by FIFA as a Qatari national, nevertheless, as he is also an Egyptian, EFA rules allow him to play in Egypt as an Egyptian.

=== Players Under 21 ===
Note: Flags indicate national team as defined under FIFA eligibility rules; some limited exceptions apply. Players may hold more than one non-FIFA nationality.

No.	Pos.	Nation	Player
26	DF	EGY	Mostafa Hegab
27	DF	EGY	Ahmed Ezzel Regal
32	FW	EGY	Bougy
33	MF	EGY	Mohamad Ibrahim
34	MF	EGY	Omar Gaber
36	MF	EGY	Hossam Arafat
37	DF	EGY	Mohamed Refaie 'Weya'
—	DF	EGY	Amr Barakat
—	MF	EGY	Hagag Shaaban
—	DF	EGY	Ahmed Maher
—	GK	EGY	Sherif Fawzy
—	GK	EGY	Mostafa Abdel Satar

=== Out on loan ===
Note: Flags indicate national team as defined under FIFA eligibility rules; some limited exceptions apply. Players may hold more than one non-FIFA nationality.

No.	Pos.	Nation	Player
—	MF	EGY	Ahmed El Merghany (at El-Masry until the end of season 2010-2011)

== Transfers ==
=== In ===
#	Pos	Player	From	Fee
15	DF	(Egypt) Mohamed Younis	Itesalat	Free
19	FW	(Ivory Coast) Abou Kone	El-Entag El-Harby	500k$
21	FW	(Iraq) Emad Mohammed	Sepahan	Free
22	MF	(Egypt) Ashour El-Adham	El-Masry	(Egypt) Ahmed Magdy+ (Egypt) Ahmed El Merghany(Loan)
23	MF	(Egypt) Wajih Abdel-Azim	El-Masry	Free
1	GK	(Egypt) Essam El Hadary	Ismaily	2.5M EGP + 800k$

=== Out ===
#	Pos	Player	To	Fee
1	GK	(Egypt) Mohamed Abdel Monsef	Gouna	2M EGP
4	FW	(Egypt) Sherif Ashraf	Gouna	1.15M EGP
15	DF	(Egypt) Amr Adel	Wadi Degla	1M EGP
12	MF	(Egypt) Ahmed El Merghany	El-Masry	Loan
22	DF	(Egypt) Ahmed Magdy	El-Masry	Exchange
21	GK	(Egypt) Emad El-Sayed	El-Geish	Free
26	MF	(Egypt) Ahmed Abdel-Raouf	Misr El-Maqasha	1M EGP
19	FW	(Egypt) Sayed Mosaad	Gasco	Free
23	MF	(Ivory Coast) Rémi Adiko	No Club	Free
	FW	(Egypt) Mohamed El Morsy	Al-Ittihad	Free
	MF	(Egypt) Ayman Abdel Aziz	Misr El-Maqasha	Free

== Competitions ==
=== Egyptian Premier League ===
Pos	Team	Pld	W	D	L	GF	GA	GD	Pts	Qualification
1	Al-Ahly	30	16	13	1	47	27	+20	61	2012 CAF Champions League
2	Zamalek SC	30	15	11	4	49	32	+17	56	2012 CAF Champions League
3	Ismaily	30	14	7	9	48	33	+15	49	

Updated to match(es) played on 11 July 2011. Source:
Rules for classification: 1) points; 2) goal difference; 3) number of goals scored.

=== Egypt Cup ===
Round	Opponent	Date+Time	Score*
32	Bani Ebeid FC	10/12/2010 - 16:15	6–0
16	TBA	TBA	TBA
8	TBA	TBA	TBA
Semi-Final	TBA	TBA	TBA
Final	TBA	TBA	TBA

- Zamalek's score placed first.

=== Cairo derby ===
Ended with draw 0-0

== Matches ==
=== Egyptian Premier League ===
Game	Date	Tournament	Round	Ground	Opponent	Score^{1}	Report
1	5 August 2010	Premier League	1	A	Haras El Hodoud	2–2	Report / Report link; Referee / (Egypt) Hamdy Shabaan; Haras El Hodoud / Zamalek; 16' (pen.) Ahmed Hassan Mekky; 87' Mohamed Hamed / 50' Abou Kone; 62' (pen.) Amr Zaki
2	15 August 2010	Premier League	2	H	Petrojet	2–0	Report / Report link; Referee / (Egypt) Mohamed Farouk; Zamalek / Petrojet; 15' Amr Zaki; 90+6' Shikabala
3	23 August 2010	Premier League	3	A	ENPPI	1–3	Report / Report link; Referee / (Egypt); ENPPI / Zamalek; 35' MohMohamed Aboul Ela; 49' Mohamed Nasef; 90' Die Foneye / 4' Mohamed Abdel-Shafy
4	13 September 2010	Premier League	5	H	El Gouna	1–1	Report / Report link; Referee / (Egypt) Samir Mahmoud Othman; Zamalek / El Gouna; 69' Amr Zaki / 31' (pen.) Gamal Hamza
5	18 September 2010	Premier League	6	A	Smouha	3–1	Report / Report link; Referee / (Egypt) Fahim Omar; Smouha / Zamalek; 19' Ahmed Belal / 21' Hany Said; 51' Hussein Yasser; 83' Mahmoud Fathallah
6	27 September 2010	Premier League	7	H	Al Mokawloon	1–0	Report / Report link; Referee / (Egypt) Sherif Rashwan; Zamalek / Al Mokawloon; 30' (pen.) Mahmoud Fathallah
7	2 October 2010	Premier League	8	HR	Misr Lel Makkasa	4–3	Report / Report link; Misr Lel Makkasa / Zamalek; 14' Ayman Hefni; 34' Ayman Kamel; 69' Hussein Hamdy / 41' Shikabala; 43' 73' Ahmed Gaafar; 83' Mahmoud Fathallah
8	27 October 2010	Premier League	9	H	Ittihad El Shorta	2–0	Report / Report link; Referee / (Egypt) Abdel-Kader Morsy; Zamalek / Ittihad El Shorta; 37' 56' Shikabala
9	4 November 2010	Premier League	10	A	Tala'ea El Gaish	2–2	Report / Report link; Referee / (Egypt) Yasser Abdel-Raouf; Tala'ea El Gaish / Zamalek; 39' Hossam Abdel Aal; 89' Salah Amin / 14' Alaa Ali; 85' Mahmoud Fathallah
10	10 November 2010	Premier League	4 (Post.)	H	Ismaily	3–2	Report / Report link; Referee / (Egypt) Fahim Omar; Zamalek / Ismaily; 30' Shikabala; 45' Ahmed Gaafar; 61' (o.g.) Moatasem Salem / 19' Abdallah El Said; 53' Ahmed Ali
11	21 November 2010	Premier League	11	H	Al Masry	1–0	Referee / (Egypt) Fahim Omar; Zamalek / Al Masry; 90+5' Mohamed Ibrahim

Last updated: 21 November 2010
^{1}Zamalek goals come first.
Country's flag depict country of foreign team to that of Zamalek.
Ground: H = Home; A = Away; N = Neutral; HR = Home replacement; AR = Away replacement; GD = Goal difference

== Statistics ==
=== Appearances ===
Position	Nation	Number	Name	Egyptian Premier League	Egypt Cup	CAF Champions League	Total
GK	(Egypt)	1	Essam El-Hadary	4	0	0	4
DF	(Egypt)	2	Amr El-Safty	6	0	0	6
DF	(Egypt)	3	Sabry Raheel	2	0	0	2
MF	(Ghana)	4	Abdul Rahim Ayew	1	0	0	1
MF	(Egypt)	5	Ibrahim Salah	8	0	0	8
DF	(Egypt)	6	Hany Said	8	0	0	8
DF	(Egypt)	7	Ahmed Ghanem Soltan	4	0	0	4
MF	(Egypt)	8	Hassan Mostafa	5	0	0	5
FW	(Egypt)	9	Amr Zaki	7	0	0	7
MF	(Egypt)	10	Shikabala	10	0	0	10
FW	(Egypt)	11	Ahmed Gaafar	7	0	0	7
MF	(Egypt)	12	Wajih Abdel-Azim	4	0	0	4
DF	(Egypt)	13	Mohamed Abdel-Shafy	10	0	0	10
MF	(Qatar)	14	Hussein Yasser	9	0	0	9
DF	(Egypt)	15	Mohamed Younis	0	0	0	0
GK	(Egypt)	16	Abdel Wahed El-Sayed	6	0	0	6
MF	(Egypt)	17	Alaa Ali	4	0	0	4
DF	(Egypt)	18	Hazem Emam	2	0	0	2
MF	(Ivory Coast)	19	Abou Kone	7	0	0	7
DF	(Egypt)	20	Mahmoud Fathallah	10	0	0	10
FW	(Iraq)	21	Emad Mohammed	2	0	0	2
MF	(Egypt)	22	Ashour El-Adham	9	0	0	9
DF	(Egypt)	32	Ahmed Ezzel Regal	0	0	0	0
MF	(Egypt)	33	Mohamed Ibrahim	4	0	0	4
MF	(Egypt)	34	Omar Gaber	5	0	0	5
MF	(Egypt)	36	Hossam Arafat	2	0	0	2
DF	(Egypt)	37	Weya	0	0	0	0
DF	(Egypt)	38	Ahmed Tawfik	2	0	0	2

=== Goal Scorers ===
Position	Nation	Number	Name	Egyptian Premier League	Egypt Cup	CAF Champions League	Total
MF	(Egypt)	10	Shikabala	11	0	2	13
DF	(Egypt)	20	Mahmoud Fathallah	4	0	0	4
FW	(Egypt)	9	Amr Zaki	3	0	0	3
FW	(Egypt)	11	Ahmed Gaafar	4	0	0	4
FW	(Ivory Coast)	19	Abou Kone	1	3	0	4
DF	(Egypt)	13	Mohamed Abdel-Shafy	1	0	0	1
MF	(Qatar)	14	Hussein Yasser	1	0	0	1
DF	(Egypt)	6	Hany Said	1	0	0	1
MF	(Egypt)	17	Alaa Ali	1	0	0	1
