= List of Zamalek SC players =

Zamalek Sporting Club is a professional association football club based in Giza, Egypt, that plays in Egyptian Premier League. The club was established in 1911 as Qasr El Nil Club and played its first competitive match 1912. Zamalek is the first Egyptian club to ever win a title, when they won the Sultan Hussein Cup in 1921. Zamalek is one of two clubs that have played in every season of the Egyptian Premier League, and one of seven that have never been relegated to the Egyptian Second Division. Since then, the club's first team has competed in numerous nationally and internationally organized competitions.

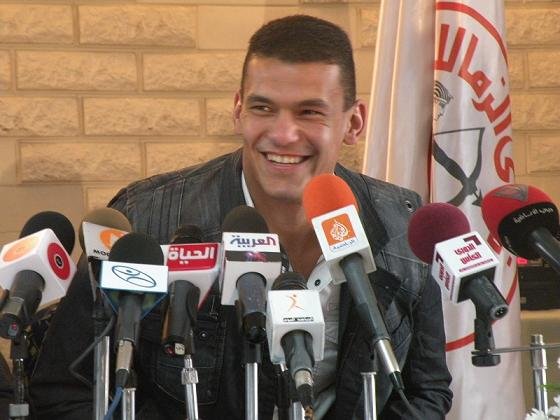
Abdel Wahed El Sayed is Zamalek's all-time record appearance-maker.

The club has won 66 domestic trophies. At the international level, the club won 17 trophies. Zamalek is the most successful football club of the 20th century in Africa (gaining 9 titles versus 7 for their closest rival), with a total of 17 international titles. Zamalek was the first Egyptian team to ever qualify for the FIFA Club World Cup.

Abdel Wahed El Sayed holds the record for most overall appearances, having played 504 from 1997 to 2014, ahead of Shikabala who made 394 appearances from 2003 till 2025. Abdel Halim Ali is Zamalek's all-time record goalscorer with 138 goals in 339 appearances. Hassan Shehata is the second-highest scorer with 102 goals ahead of Ali Khalil, who is third with 94 goals. Zamalek has employed numerous famous players, with players winning African Footballer of the Year, EFA Egyptian Footballer of the Year.

== List of players ==
The list includes notable footballers who have played for Zamalek. Generally, this means players that have played at least 50 official matches. However, some players who have played fewer matches are also included if they are on Zamalek's list of Legendary Players.

=== 1911–1989 ===
Name	Nationality	Position	Zamalek career	Captaincy	Appearances	Goals	Notes
Ahmed Kadry	Egypt	Forward	1911–??				
Taha Farghaly	Egypt	Midfielder	1911–??				
Hussein Fawzi	Egypt	Forward	1911–??				
Mohamed Gabr	Egypt	Forward	1911–??				
Amin Gabriel	Egypt	Winger	1911–??				
Mahmoud Marei	Egypt	Forward	1912–??				
Abdel Salam Hamdi	Egypt	Defender	1912–??				
Youssef Muhammad	Egypt	Forward	1912–1919				
Tewfik Abdullah	Egypt	Forward	1912–1920; 1930–1932				
Ali El-Hassani	Egypt	Forward	1914–1923; 1927–1929; 1931–1932				
Fuad Gamil	Egypt	Winger	1916–1929				
Gamil Osman	Egypt	Midfielder	1916–1927				
Ibrahim Yakan	Egypt	Forward	1917–1926				
Ahmed Salem	Egypt	Winger	1918–1926; 1927–1934				
Hussein Hegazi	Egypt	Forward	1919–1923; 1928–1931				
El-Sayed Abaza	Egypt	Forward	1920–1923; 1928–1930				
Mohamed Latif	Egypt	Winger	1920–1935; 1936–1945				
Ali Riadh	Egypt	Forward	1920–1923; 1933–1935				
Mostafa Kamel Taha	Egypt	Forward	1929–1938				
Nicola	Egypt						
Mahmoud Emam	Egypt						
Sayed Marie	Egypt						
Ali Shafi	Egypt	Midfielder					
Ali El-Kaf	Egypt	Defender	1930–1938				
Al-Labban	Egypt						
Ali Shoier	Egypt						
Husein Labib	Egypt						
Hassan El-Far	Egypt	Defender	1930–1938				
Ismail Rafaat	Egypt	Forward	1930–1938				
Ahmed Kholosy	Egypt						
Mohammed Bakhati	Egypt	Midfielder	1933–1937				
Mohammed Hassan Helmy	Egypt	Midfielder	1934–1948				
Kamel Abd Rabu	Egypt						
Ahmed Halim Ibrahim	Egypt	Midfielder	1933–1937				
Hussein El-Far	Egypt						
Mahmoud Marie	Egypt						
Abdulrahman Fawzi	Egypt	Winger	1935–1947				
Ismail Al-Samkary	Egypt						
Niazy Gregaitos	Greece						
Qadry Mostafa	Egypt						
Ibrahim Nigm	Egypt						
Yehia Emam	Egypt	Goalkeeper	1937–1953				
Omar Shendi	Egypt	Defender	1938–1949				
Abdel-Karim Sakr	Egypt	Forward	1938–1945				
Galal Keraitam	Egypt						
Hanafy Bastan	Egypt	Defender	1940–1958				
Al-Arabi	Egypt						
Galal Qadri	Egypt						
Mohsen Al-Sehaimy	Egypt						
Anwar El-Beshbeshy	Egypt						
Mahmoud Hafez "Zoklot"	Egypt						
Abdel Rehim Shendi	Egypt						
Sherif El-Far	Egypt	Winger	1946–1961				
Ali Sharaf	Egypt						
Mohamed Amin	Egypt						
Saad Rostom	Egypt						
Essam Baheeg	Egypt	Winger	1949–1960				
Alaa El-Hamouly	Egypt	Forward	1950–1961				
Abd El-Aziz Qabil	Egypt						
Nour El-Dali	Egypt	Midfielder	1950–1959				
Zaki Osman	Egypt						
Yones Marie	Egypt						
Halim Thaloth	Egypt						
Yakan Hussien	Egypt	Defender	1954–1972			9	
Bebo	Egypt						
Samir Abd El-Aziz	Egypt						
Mimi Fekry	Egypt						
Raafat Attia	Egypt	Forward	1955–1967				
Samir Qotb	Egypt	Midfielder	1955–1967			11	
Mohamed Refaie	Egypt	Defender	1955–1965				
Abdu Noshi	Egypt	Midfielder	1955–1965				
Ali Mohsen	Yemen	Forward	1956–1965				
Zamer Ezzat	Egypt						
Halim	Egypt						
Hamada Emam	Egypt	Forward	1957–1974			84	
Aldo Stella	Italy	Goalkeeper	1958–1962				
Ahmed Mostafa	Egypt	Defender	1958–1967				
Abo Al-Qasem	Egypt						
Ahmed Abo Hussien	Egypt						
Hilal Musa	Egypt						
Khalil Qadtry	Egypt						
Ali Bakr	Egypt						
Ali Mahmoud	Egypt						
Farouk Al-Turky	Egypt						
Auliman Dawood	Egypt						
Hamada Al-Sharqawy	Egypt						
Mahmoud Abou-Regaila	Egypt	Defender	1959–1966				
Nabil Nosair	Egypt	Winger	1959–1967				
Omar Al-Noor	Sudan	Midfielder	1960–1975			25	
Hossam Wasfy	Egypt	Midfielder	1960–1973				
Ahmed Reffat	Egypt	Midfielder	1961–1973				
Ahmed Effat	Egypt						
Abd El-Maksoud Salah	Egypt						
Farouk El-Sayed	Egypt	Winger	1963–1977				
Abd El-Karim El-Gohary	Egypt	Defender	1963–1976				
Abdel Hamid Shaheen	Egypt	Goalkeeper					
Hesham Azmy	Egypt						
Shawky Abu El-Saod	Egypt						
El-Bardesy	Egypt						
Samir Mohamed Ali	Sudan						
El-gohary El-Sagheer	Egypt						
Tarek Ghonaim	Egypt						
Abd El-Sammad	Egypt						
Said Doalla	Egypt						
Galal Mahmoud	Egypt						
Hassan Shehata	Egypt	Forward	1967–1968; 1971–1983			102	
Taha Basry	Egypt	Midfielder	1967–1979			26	
Shawky Hussein	Egypt	Defender	1968–1977				
Ashraf Abu El-Nour	Egypt	Goalkeeper	1970–1975				
Mohamed Tawfik	Egypt	Defender	1970–1980				
Ghanem Soltan	Egypt	Midfielder	1970–1981			2	
Ali Khalil	Egypt	Forward	1970–1980			97	
Nooh Adam	Sudan	Defender	1970–1976				
Farouk Gaafar	Egypt	Midfielder	1971–1988				
Mahmoud El-Khawaga	Egypt	Winger	1971–1982				
Salah El-Nahy	Egypt						
Helmy Toulan	Egypt	Midfielder	1972–1979				
Adel El-Maamour	Egypt	Goalkeeper	1975–1988				
Mohamed Salah	Egypt	Defender	1975–1988				
Wahid Kamal	Egypt						
Mohamed Said	Egypt						
Farouk Fawzy	Egypt						
Mahmoud Saad	Egypt	Defender	1975–1987				
Ibrahim Youssef	Egypt	Defender	1975–1988				
Ibrahim Yossef	Egypt	Defender	1977–1989				
Sami Mansour	Egypt	Defender	1977–1985				
Gamal Abdullah	Egypt	Defender	1977–1990				
Sabry El-Meniawy	Egypt						
Mohamed Taher	Sudan						
Mahmoud Fawzy	Egypt						
Abd El-Rehem Mohamed	Egypt						
Adel Abd El-Moaty	Egypt						
Hamama	Egypt						
Ahmed Abd El-Halim	Egypt						
Mamdouh Mosbah	Egypt						
Hashim Ibrahim	Sudan						
Mansour Hafiz	Egypt						
Said El-Gadie	Egypt						
Hesham Yakan	Egypt	Defender	1982–1995				
Badr Hamid	Egypt						
Medhat Mekky	Egypt						
Hamada Nasr	Egypt						
Mohamed Gamal	Egypt	Defender					
El-Rasheedi El-Ebaidi	Sudan						
Reda Hemida	Egypt						
Hany Ebada	Egypt						
Adolf	Ghana						
Hesham Ismail	Egypt						
Adel Dosoky	Egypt						
Mohamed Genedy	Egypt						
Atef Gad	Egypt						
Osama Abd El-Gelil	Egypt						
Adel Ibrahim	Egypt						
Medhat Mostafa	Egypt						
Henry Thompson	Ghana						
Abd El-Moniem El-Sayad	Sudan						
Ismail Scondo	Sudan						
Shabandar	Egypt						
Mansour Hafiz	Egypt						
Amr Abd-El-Salam	Egypt						
Mohamed Abd El-Gelil	Egypt						
Akl Gad Allah	Egypt						
Zakaria Nasef	Egypt						
Hussein Abd El-Rasoul	Egypt						
Mohammed Helmy	Egypt						
Adel Abd El-Wahid	Egypt						
Tarek Yehia	Egypt	Midfielder	1981–1992				
Emmanuel Quarshie	Ghana	Midfielder	1983–1986				
Ayman Younes	Egypt	Midfielder	1983–1992				
Hamada Abd El-Latif	Egypt						
Nasr Ibrahim	Egypt						
Gamal Abdel-Hameed	Egypt	Forward	1984–1994			97	
Ashraf Kasem	Egypt	Defender	1984–1997			28	
Ismail Yossef	Egypt	Midfielder	1984–1997			25	
Nasser Abd El-Latif	Egypt						
Magdy Shalaby	Egypt						
Khaled Galal	Egypt	Defender	1986–1995				
Magdy Tolba	Egypt	Midfielder	1986–1989				
Ahmed Ramzy	Egypt	Midfielder	1987–1996			23	
Hussein El-Sayed	Egypt	Goalkeeper	1987–1999				
Emad Al-Mandoh	Egypt						
Alaa Abd El-Aal	Egypt						
Tarek Abd El-Alim	Egypt						
Khaled Abd El-Rahman	Egypt						
Ayman Taher	Egypt	Goalkeeper				-42	
Atef Abd El-Hady	Egypt						
Effat Nassar	Egypt	Midfielder	1987–1996			34	
Ahmed Salim	Egypt						
Salah Al-Tayeb	Egypt						
Nabil Mahmoud	Egypt					17	
Ahmed El-Shazly	Egypt					10	
Reda Abdel-Aal	Egypt	Midfielder	1987–1993			14	
Tamer Abdel Hamid	Egypt	Defender	1988–1993			12	
Emad Salah	Egypt	Midfielder	1989–1990				
Talaat Mansour	Egypt	Defender	1989–1996				

=== 1990–1999 ===
Name	Nationality	Position	Zamalek career	Captaincy	Appearances	Goals	Notes
Mostafa Nigm	Palestine	Defender	1990–1993				
Hussein Abd El-Latif	Egypt	Defender	1990–1996		21	0	
Essam Marei	Egypt	Midfielder	1991–1998		26	3	
Emmanuel Amuneke	Nigeria	Winger	1991–1994		71	26	
Mostafa Ibrahim	Egypt						
Sami El-Sheshini	Egypt	Defender	1991–2001		38	2	
Walid Moaz	Egypt					1	
Ayman Mansour	Egypt	Forward	1991–1997			54	
Harouna Youssef	Ghana						
Yehia Nabil	Egypt				9	1	
Ahmed Sary	Egypt	Forward	1992–1993		8		
Nader El-Sayed	Egypt	Goalkeeper	1992–1998		27	-18	
Aki Akshendi	Nigeria	Forward	1993–1994			4	
Osmano Somano	Mali	Defender	1993–1994				
Ashraf Youssef	Egypt	Defender	1993–1995		0	0	
Hazem Emam	Egypt	Midfielder	1993–1996; 2001–2008	2003–2008	124	27	
Joe Otchiri	Ghana	Forward	1993–1995				
Ayman Shawky	Egypt	Forward	1993–1994				
William Anganga	Kenya		1994–1995				
Khaled El-Ghandour	Egypt	Midfielder	1994–2003	1997–2003	53	2	
Mohamed Sabry	Egypt	Midfielder	1994–2003		52	7	
Islam Fathi	Egypt	Midfielder	1994–1995				
Laod Oscar	Ghana	Forward	1994–1995				
Medhat Abdel-Hady	Egypt	Defender	1994–2000; 2001–2006			20	
Kamel Kaci-Saïd	Algeria	Midfielder	1994–1996				
Ahmed El-Kass	Egypt	Forward	1995–1997			25	
Rami Shaaban	Sweden	Goalkeeper	1995		4	0	
Tarek Mostafa	Egypt	Midfielder	1995–1999		37	4	
Moatamed Gamal	Egypt	Defender	1995–1996		11	1	
Sayed Hanafi	Egypt	Defender			24	2	
Ayman Abdelaziz	Egypt	Midfielder	1995–2000; 2008		75	8	
Tarek El-Sayed	Egypt	Defender	1995–2008		219	23	
Moamen Suliman	Egypt	Midfielder	1995–1998		8	0	
Mohamed Abdel-Galil	Egypt	Forward	1995–1997				
Tamer Begato	Egypt	Midfielder	1996–1997				
Mohamed Kamouna	Egypt	Midfielder	1996–2003		89	4	
Moussa Touri	Burkina Faso		1997–1998		6	1	
Osama Nabih	Egypt	Forward	1997–2002		68	25	
Ahmed Abdullah	Egypt	Midfielder	1997–2000		36	14	
Mohamed Ramadan	Egypt	Forward			9	2	
Akram Abdel-Majeed	Egypt	Forward	1997–1999		15	4	
Soumaila Coulibaly	Mali	Midfielder	1997–2000		42	6	
Mohamed El-Sayed	Egypt				22	0	
Mohamed El-Kot	Egypt				43	1	
Ahmed Metwalli	Egypt	Defender	1997–1998		11	1	
Besheer El-Tabei	Egypt	Defender	1997–2008		160	9	
Ayman Mashaly	Egypt				19	1	
Abdul Hamid Bassiouny	Egypt	Forward	1997–2000		52	20	
Abdelwahed El-Sayed	Egypt	Goalkeeper	1998–2014	2008–2014	223	-117	
Tarek El-Said	Egypt	Midfielder	1998–2006		148	23	
Hossam Abdelmoneim	Egypt	Defender	1998–2004		86	11	
Amr Fahim	Egypt	Defender	1998–2001		36	1	
Abd El-Latif El-Doumany	Egypt	Forward	1998–2002		47	13	
Haytham Farouk	Egypt	Defender			31	2	
Elvis Rubin	Nigeria	Midfielder	1998–1999		12	3	
Cristopher	Nigeria	Defender	1998–1999		12	3	
Andy Chiko	Nigeria	Forward	1998–1999				
Abdel Halim Ali	Egypt	Forward	1999–2009		??	134	
Mohamed Aboul Ela	Egypt	Midfielder	1999–2009		149	9	
Ahmed Saleh	Egypt	Defender			94	0	
Mohamed Abdel Monsef	Egypt	Goalkeeper	1999–2010		140	-127	
Wael El-Quabbani	Egypt	Defender	1999–2007		126	11	
Ahmed Moaz	Egypt	Defender			20	0	
Osama Ammar	Egypt	Defender					
Basem Sayed Al-Regal	Egypt	Midfielder					
Amir Zaki	Egypt	Forward					
Khalid El-Sayed Taha	Egypt	Midfielder					
Ahmed Hossam (Mido)	Egypt	Forward	1999–2000; 2009–2010; 2011–2012		16	5	

=== 2000–2009 ===
Name	Nationality	Position	Zamalek career	Captaincy	Appearances	Goals	Notes
Ibrahim Hassan	Egypt	Defender	2000–2004		47	4	
Hossam Hassan	Egypt	Forward	2000–2004		61	38	
Tamer Abdel Hamid	Egypt	Midfielder	2000–2007		141	10	
Walid Salah Abdel Latif	Egypt	Forward	2000–2007		73	18	
Al-Hassan Mohamed	Egypt		2000–2002		9	0	
Gamal Hamza	Egypt	Midfielder	2000–2009			74	
Wael Zenga	Egypt	Goalkeeper	2000–2008				
Felix Aboagye	Ghana	Forward	2001–2002		20	5	
Ramadan Ragab	Egypt	Forward					
Mahmoud Mahmoud	Egypt	Defender	2001–2007		54	2	
Reda Seka	Egypt	Defender	2001–2003		4	0	
Mohamed Abdel Wahed	Egypt	Defender	2001–2005		75	10	
Freddie Mwila Jr.	Zambia	Midfielder	2001–2002				
Ahmed Samir	Egypt	Defender	2001–2004; 2010–2014		27	1	
Shikabala	Egypt	Winger	2002–2005; 2007–2014; 2016–2017; 2019–2025		394	78	
Mohamed Sedik	Egypt	Defender	2002–2006		66	3	
Ahmed Omran	Egypt	Forward			7	0	
Hany El-Agazy	Egypt	Forward	2002–2007		7	0	
Osama Othman	Egypt	Forward					
Walid Anwar	Egypt	Forward					
Amer Sabry	Egypt	Midfielder	2002–2005			0	
Atoat Abd El-Halim	Egypt	Goalkeeper				-2	
Amir Azmy	Egypt	Defender	2002–2005		12	0	
Islam El-Shater	Egypt	Defender	2003–2004			1	
Hossam Abd El-Aal	Egypt	Midfielder					
Moataz Eno	Egypt	Midfielder	2002–2007		60	5	
Sameh Youssef	Egypt	Forward	2003–2006		43	5	
Hossam Osama	Egypt	Forward			11	2	
Mohamed Mahmoud Khafaga	Egypt	Forward					
Ibrahim Said	Egypt	Defender	2004–2006		27	4	
Ahmed El-Bakry	Egypt	Defender	2004–2006		25	1	
Salih Sadir	Iraq	Midfielder	2004–2005		11	0	
Ahmed Ghanem Soltan	Egypt	Defender	2004–2011		94	0	
Marc Mboua	Cameroon	Forward	2004–2005		6	0	
Ernest Papa Arko	Ghana	Forward	2004		5	1	
Hossam Zainhom	Egypt	Defender			7	0	
Walid Qandiel	Egypt	Defender					
Ahmed Zaher	Egypt	Defender					
Ahmed Hossam	Egypt	Defender	2005–2008		20	0	
Sunny Ekeh Kingsley	Nigeria	Forward	2005–2006		4	0	
Farag Shalaby	Egypt	Defender	2005–2006		4	0	
Tamer Abd El-Wahhab	Egypt	Defender	2005–2007		34	0	
Adel Fathi	Egypt	Defender	2005–2006		2	0	
Yossef Hamdy	Egypt	Midfielder	2005–2007		33	4	
Alaa Abdel-Ghany	Egypt	Midfielder	2005–2008		45	3	
Mostafa Gaafar	Egypt	Forward	2005–2009		59	15	
Edson Sousa	Portugal	Forward	2005–2006		3	1	
Awulley Junior Quaye	Ghana	Forward	2005–2007		28	6	
Ahmed Mohsen	Egypt	Defender	2005–2006		2	0	
Tarik El Jarmouni	Morocco	goal keeper	2006–2006				
Jean-Jacques Tizié	Côte d'Ivoire	goal keeper	2006–2007				
Yamen Ben Zekry	Tunisia	Defender	2006–2007		15	0	
Amr El-Safty	Egypt	Defender	2006–2011		94	1	
Magdy Atwa	Egypt	Midfielder	2006–2007		30	4	
Amr Zaki	Egypt	Forward	2006–2012			41	
Ahmed Abdel-Raouf	Egypt	Midfielder	2006–2010		68	1	
Wisam El Abdy	Tunisia	Defender	2006–2008		17	1	
Emad El-Sayed	Egypt	Goalkeeper	2007–2010				
Mahmoud Fathalla	Egypt	Defender	2007–2014		111	18	
Khaled Saad	Jordan	Defender	2007–2008		6	0	
Karim Zekri	Egypt	Defender	2007–2009		15	0	
Osama Hassan	Egypt	Defender	2006–2009		30	4	
Mohamed Ibrahim	Egypt	Defender	2007–2009		16	1	
Ahmed Magdy	Egypt	Defender	2007–2010		73	5	
Sherif Ashraf	Egypt	Forward	2007–2010		52	14	
Mohamed Abdullah	Egypt	Defender	2007–2009; 2010		30	0	
Alaa Ali	Egypt	Midfielder	2007–2013		41	3	
Ahmed Ibrahim Zakaria	Egypt	Defender	2007–2009		3	0	
Hany Said I	Egypt	Defender	2008–2011		61	4	
Ricardo Alves Fernandes	Brazil	Defender	2008–2009		6	1	
Amr Adel	Egypt	Defender	2008–2010		15	0	
Mahmoud Samir	Egypt	Midfielder	2008–2009		9	1	
Alaa Kamal	Egypt	Midfielder	2008–2009		7	1	
Junior Agogo	Ghana	Forward	2008–2009		11	3	
Hossam Arafat	Egypt	Midfielder	2008–2012		19	1	
Hazem Emam II	Egypt	Defender	2008–	2014–	48	2	
Ahmed El Merghany	Egypt	Midfielder	2008–2013		24	1	
Mohamed El-Morsy	Egypt	Forward	2008		10	0	
Eugène Koffi Kouamé	Côte d'Ivoire	Forward	2008–2009		3	0	
Sabri Raheel	Egypt	Defender	2009–2013		32	1	
Ibrahim Salah	Egypt	Midfielder	2008–2013; 2014–		53	f	
Mohamed Abdel-Shafy	Egypt	Defender	2009–2015		??	10	
Sayed Mosaad	Egypt	Forward	2009–2010		3	1	
Rémi Adiko	Côte d'Ivoire	Midfielder	2009–2010		11	1	
Abdul Rahim Ayew	Ghana	Defender	2009–2010		10	1	
Hassan Mostafa	Egypt	Midfielder	2009–2011		42	3	
Ahmed Gaafar	Egypt	Forward	2009–2014; 2015-		??	44	
Ahmed Fathi (Bogy)	Egypt	Forward	2009–2010		2	0	
Mohamed Ibrahim II	Egypt	Midfielder	2009–2014; 2015-2019		21	2	
Omar Gaber	Egypt	Winger	2010–2016; 2022-			12	
Mohamed Refaie	Egypt	Midfielder	2009–2011		1	0	

=== 2010–2019 ===
Name	Nationality	Position	Zamalek career	Captaincy	Appearances	Goals	Notes
Hussein Yasser	Qatar	Midfielder	2010–2011		37	7	
Essam El-Hadary	Egypt	Goalkeeper	2010		4	-7	
Mostafa Abdel Satar	Egypt	Goalkeeper	2010–2013		0	0	
Mahmoud Abdel Rahim	Egypt	Goalkeeper	2011–				
Mohamed Younis	Egypt	Defender	2010–2011		3	0	
Ahmed Kattawi	Egypt	Midfielder	2010–				
Ahmed Tawfik	Egypt	Midfielder	2010–			4	
Wajih Abdel-Azim	Egypt	Midfielder	2010–2011		8	1	
Ashour El-Adham	Egypt	Midfielder	2010–2011		22	1	
Abou Kone	Côte d'Ivoire	Forward	2010–2011		17	1	
Emad Mohammed	Iraq	Forward	2010		2	0	
Mohamed Amine Aoudia	Algeria	Forward	2011		7	1	
Hassan Youssef	Egypt	Forward	2010–2011		2	0	
Mahmoud El-Badry	Egypt	Defender	2010–2013				
Karim Alhassan	Ghana	Defender	2011–2012		0	0	
Hany Said II	Egypt	Defender	2011–2014				
Salah Soliman	Egypt	Defender	2011–2014			1	
Ahmed Hassan	Egypt	Midfielder	2011–2013			15	
Said Mohamed Otta	Egypt	Forward	2011–2014				
Hussein Hamdy	Egypt	Forward	2011–2012		4	2	
Razak Omotoyossi	Benin	Forward	2011–2012			6	
Nour El Sayed	Egypt	Midfielder	2012–2014			1	
Islam Awad	Egypt	Winger	2012–2014			0	
Alexis Enam	Cameroon	Midfielder	2012–2013				
Abdoulaye Cisse	Burkina Faso	Forward	2012–2013; 2014–2016		??	12	
Ahmed El-Shenawy	Egypt	Goalkeeper	2012–2013; 2014–				
Hamada Tolba	Egypt	Defender	2012–2014			1	
Ahmed Eid Abdel Malek	Egypt	Midfielder	2013–2014			12	
Youssef Hassan	Egypt	Midfielder	2013				
Ali Fareed	Egypt	Forward	2013		0	0	
Mohamed El-Aqabawy	Egypt	Goalkeeper	2013		0	0	
Ahmed Fawzi	Egypt	Defender	2013		0	0	
Mohamed Abou Gabal	Egypt	Goalkeeper	2013–2016				
Moamen Zakaria	Egypt	Midfielder	2013–2014			12	
Arafa El-Sayed	Egypt	Forward	2013–2014			0	
Ahmed Ali Kamel	Egypt	Forward	2013–			18	
Mostafa Fathi	Egypt	Midfielder	2013–			7	
Omar Gamal	Egypt	Midfielder	2014		2	0	
Dominique Da Silva	Mauritania	Forward	2014		6	3	
Ahmed Samir Farag	Egypt	Midfielder	2014		4	1	
Abd El-Rahman Salah	Egypt	Defender	2014–				
Omar Youssef	Egypt	Midfielder	2014–				
Reda El-Azab	Egypt	Defender	2014–				
Islam Gamal	Egypt	Defender	2014–				
Ahmed Duiedar	Egypt	Defender	2014–				
Mohamed Koffi	Burkina Faso	Midfielder	2014–			1	
Khaled Kamar	Egypt	Forward	2014–			6	
Ayman Hefny	Egypt	Midfielder	2014–			5	
Maarouf Youssef	Burkina Faso	Midfielder	2014–				
Basem Morsi	Egypt	Forward	2014–			14	
Tarek Hamed	Egypt	Midfielder	2014–			1	
Mohamed Shaaban	Egypt	Midfielder	2014–				
Saleh Moussa	Egypt	Defender	2014–				
Ali Gabr	Egypt	Defender	2014–			2	
Mohamed Abd El-Razek	Egypt	Defender	2014–				
Yasser Ibrahim	Egypt	Defender	2014-				
Mahmoud Khaled	Egypt	Midfielder	2014-				
Youssef Obama	Egypt	Forward	2014-				
Ahmed Samir II	Egypt	Midfielder	2014–			1	
Sherif Alaa	Egypt	Defender	2015-				
Mohamed Adel Gomaa	Egypt	Defender	2015-2016				
Mohamed Salem	Egypt	Forward	2015-				
Ahmed Hassan Mekky	Egypt	Forward	2015-2016				
Mahmoud Kahraba	Egypt	Forward	2015-				
Ibrahim Abdel-Khaleq	Egypt	Midfielder	2015-				
Ahmed Hamoudi	Egypt	Midfielder	2015-2016				Loan
Ramzi Khaled	Egypt	Defender	2015-				
Emmanuel Mayuka	Zambia	Forward	2015-				
Ali Fathy	Egypt	Defender	2016-				
Salah Atef	Egypt	Midfielder	2016-				
Osama Ibrahim	Egypt	Defender	2016-				
Mahmoud Abdel-Aati	Egypt	Midfielder	2016-				
Mohamed Nasef	Egypt	Midfielder	2016-				
Shawky El Said	Egypt	Midfielder	2016-				
Hosny Fathy	Egypt	Defender	2016-				
Mouhammad Majdy	Egypt	Defender	2016-				
Stanley Ohawuchi	Nigeria	Forward	2016-				
Ahmed Refaat	Egypt	Defender	2016-				
Mahmoud Hamdy	Egypt	Defender	2016-				
Ahmed Fatouh	Egypt	Defender	2016-		93	2	
Mostafa Mohamed	Egypt	Striker	2017-2022		53	19	
Razzaq Cisse	Ivory Coast	Striker	2017-2022		16	0	
Hossam Salama	Egypt	Attack	2017-2019		18	3	
Ahmed Kaboria	Egypt	Striker	2017-2018		1	0	
Ahmed Magdy	Egypt	Midfielder	2017-2018		2	0	
Benjamin Acheampong	Ghana	Striker	2017-2018		6	2	
Ahmed Dawoda	Egypt	Midfielder	2017-2018		15	0	
Kabungo Kasongo	Democratic Republic of the Congo	Striker	2017-2021		74	22	
Salah Ashour	Egypt	Striker	2017-2018		7	1	
Mohamed El Shamy	Egypt	Striker	2017-2018		17	1	
Ahmed Madbouly	Egypt	Midfielder	2017-2019		30	7	
Mohamed Ramadan	Egypt	Midfielder	2017-2018		2	0	
Abdullah Gomaa	Egypt	Striker	2017-2023		132	2	
Mahmoud Alaa	Egypt	Defender	2017-2024		172	41	
Moayad Al-Ajan	Syria	Defender	2017-2018		16	2	
Alaa Al-Shabli	Syria	Defender	2017-2018		0	0	
Mohamed Ashraf Ruqa	Egypt	Midfielder	2017-2024		43	5	
Omar Salah	Egypt	Goalkeeper	2017-2019		7	-6	
Emad Fathy	Egypt	Striker	2018-2019		16	3	
Nana Poku	Ghana	Striker	2018-2018		7	1	
Hamdi Nagguez	Tunisia	Defense	2018-2020; 2021-2021		63	9	
Mohamed Antar	Egypt	Midfielder	2018-2020		33	3	
Mahmoud Abdel Aziz	Egypt	Defense	2018-2022		65	6	
Mohamed Abdel Ghany	Egypt	Defense	2018-2024		124	3	
Omar El Said	Egypt	Forward	2018-2022		83	15	
Hamid Ahaddad	Morocco	Forward	2018-2021		42	4	
Ibrahim Hassan	Egypt	Midfielder	2018-2019		42	7	
Bahaa Magdy	Egypt	Defense	2018-2019		17	0	
Mohamed Ahmed Camacho	Egypt	Forward	2018-2019		2	0	
Mohamed Hassan	Egypt	Midfielder	2018-2020		20	0	
Mohamed Abdel Salam	Egypt	Defender	2018-2022		29	0	
Ferjani Sassi	Tunisia	Midfielder	2018-2021		102	16	
Khaled Boutaib	Morocco	Forward	2019-2020		24	5	
Ahmed Sayed	Egypt	Midfielder	2019-2025		140	33	
Achraf Bencharki	Morocco	Midfielder	2019-2022		109	41	
Islam Gaber	Egypt	Midfielder	2019-2022		75	0	
Mohamed Sobhi	Egypt	Goalkeeper	2019-		2	-2	
Mohamed Awad	Egypt	Goalkeeper	2019-		73	-33	
Karim Bambo	Egypt	Striker	2019-2021		12	1	
Mohamed Ounajem	Morocco	Midfielder	2019-2022		64	5	
Imam Ashour	Egypt	Midfielder	2019-2023		77	12	

=== 2020– ===
Name	Nationality	Position	Zamalek career	Captaincy	Appearances	Goals	Notes
Hamza Mathlouthi	Tunisia	Defender	2020–2025		37	7	
Hossam Abdelmaguid	Egypt	Defender	2020–				
Hossam Ashraf	Egypt	Striker	2020–2023; 2024–2025				
Osama Faisal	Egypt	Forward	2020–2023		0	0	
Marwan Hamdy	Egypt	Forward	2021–2022				
Ahmed Eid	Egypt	Midfielder	2021–2023				
Yassin Marei	Egypt	Midfielder	2021–2022				
Omar Kamal	Egypt	Defender	2021–2023			0	
Mahmoud Shabana	Egypt	Midfielder	2021–2022				
Seifeddine Jaziri	Tunisia	Striker	2021–				
Hamdy Alaa	Egypt	Midfielder	2023–2023				
Zakaria El Wardi	Morocco	Midfielder	2022–2023		22	1	
Ibrahima Ndiaye	Senegal	Midfielder	2022–2024				
Nabil Emad	Egypt	Midfielder	2022-				
Mohamed Hossam Bisso	Egypt	Midfielder	2022-2023				
Mustafa El-Zenary	Egypt	Midfielder	2022-2025				
Youssef Hassan	Egypt	Midfielder	2022-2025				
Mustafa Shalaby	Egypt	Midfielder	2022-2025				
Samson Akinyoola	Benin	Forward	2022-2024				
Amr El-Sisi	Egypt	Midfielder	2022-2023				
Nasser Mansi	Egypt	Forward	2023-				
Ahmed Belhadj	Morocco	Midfield	2023-2023				
Ahmed Hossam	Egypt	Midfielder	2024-				
Mohamed Shehata	Egypt	Midfielder	2024-				
Abdallah El-Said	Egypt	Midfielder	2024-				
Nasser Maher	Egypt	Midfielder	2024-2026				
Ahmed Hamdy	Egypt	Midfielder	2024-				
Omar Faraj	Palestine	Forward	2024-				
Mahmoud Bentayg	Morocco	Defender	2024-				
Mohamed Hamdy	Egypt	Defender	2024-2025				
Ahmed Al-Jafeli	Tunisia	Midfielder	2025–2025				
Mahmoud Gehad	Egypt	Midfielder	2025-				
Sallah Mossadek	Morocco	Defender	2025				
Oday Dabbagh	Palestine	Forward	2025-				
Amr Nasser	Egypt	Striker	2025-				
Juan Alvina	Brazil	Forward	2025-				
Abdelhamid Maali	Morocco	Forward	2025-				
Mohamed El Sayed	Egypt	Midfielder	2025-				
El Mahdy Soliman	Egypt	Goalkeeper	2025-				
Ahmed Sherif	Egypt	Forward	2025-				
Adam Kaied	Palestine	Midfielder	2025-				
Chico Banza	Angola	Forward	2025-				
Ahmed Rabie	Egypt	Midfielder	2025-				
Mohamed Ismail	Egypt	Defender	2025-				

Currently playing for Zamalek

== Team captains ==
Throughout its history, Zamalek has had 31 club captains. The following players have been official Zamalek captains.

No.	Name
1	(Egypt) Ahmed Kadry
2	(Egypt) Amin Gabriel
3	(Egypt) Tewfik Abdullah
4	(Egypt) Mohamed Gabr
5	(Egypt) Ibrahim Yakan
6	(Egypt) Fouad Gamil
7	(Egypt) Mokhtar Fawzi
8	(Egypt) Ahmed Salem
9	(Egypt) Mohamed Latif
10	(Egypt) Mostafa Taha
11	(Egypt) Ahmed Halim
12	(Egypt) Yehia Emam
13	(Egypt) Hanafy Bastan
14	(Egypt) Nour El-Dali
15	(Egypt) Yakan Hussein
16	(Egypt) Hamada Emam
17	(Egypt) Taha Basry
18	(Egypt) Hassan Shehata
19	(Egypt) Farouk Gaafar
20	(Egypt) Ibrahim Youssef
21	(Egypt) Hisham Yakan
22	(Egypt) Ismail Youssef
23	(Egypt) Hussein El Sayed
24	(Egypt) Khaled El Ghandour
25	(Egypt) Hazem Emam
26	(Egypt) Abdel-Wahed El-Sayed
27	(Egypt) Hazem Emam II
28	(Egypt) Shikabala
29	(Egypt) Hazem Emam II
30	(Egypt) Shikabala
31	(Egypt) Omar Gaber
