= 2011 Egypt Cup final =

- Event: 2010–11 Egypt Cup
Zamalek	ENPPI
1	2
- Date: 11 October 2011
- Venue: Cairo Stadium, Cairo
- Referee: Jérôme Laperrière (Swiss)
- Attendance: 70,000

2011 Egypt Cup final, was the final match of 2010–11 Egypt Cup, when Zamalek played ENPPI at Cairo Stadium in Cairo.

ENPPIwon the game 2–1, claiming the cup for the 2nd time.

== Route to the final ==
Zamalek		Round	ENPPI
Opponent	Result	2010–11 Egypt Cup	Opponent	Result
Beni Ebaid	6–0	Round of 32	Al-Rebat We Al-Anwar	2–1
Wadi Degla	4–1	Round of 16	Al-Ahly	1–0
Gouna	3–2	Quarterfinals	Ittihad El-Shorta	0–0 (6-5 p)
Haras El-Hodood	2–1	Semifinals	Arab Contractors	2–2 (8-7 p)

== Game description ==
=== Match details ===
11 October 2011

Zamalek	1–2	ENPPI
Zaki 49'	[[[Category:All articles with unsourced statements]] Report]	Mostafa 54'; Abd El-Zaher 81'

Cairo Stadium
Attendance: 70,000
Referee: Jérôme Laperrière (Swiss)

Zamalek	ENPPI

Zamalek:
GK	16	(Egypt) Abdelwahed El-Sayed
RB	18	(Egypt) Hazem Emam	(substituted off) 64'
CB	29	(Egypt) Salah Soliman
RB	20	(Egypt) Mahmoud Fathallah
LB	13	(Egypt) Mohamed Abdel-Shafy
CM	12	(Egypt) Ahmed El Merghany
CM	5	(Egypt) Ibrahim Salah
CM	17	(Egypt) Ahmed Hassan	(substituted off) 85'
AM	10	(Egypt) Shikabala
CF	11	(Egypt) Ahmed Gaafar	(substituted off) 78'
CF	9	(Egypt) Amr Zaki
Substitutions:
RB	34	(Egypt) Omar Gaber	(substituted in) 64'
AM	22	(Egypt) Alaa Ali	(substituted in) 78'
CF		(Egypt) Hussein Hamdy	(substituted in) 85'
Manager:
(Egypt) Hassan Shehata

ENPPI:
GK	32	(Egypt) Mohamed Abou Gabal
CB	6	(Egypt) Osama Ragab
CB	5	(Egypt) Abdel-Zaher El-Saqqa		(substituted off) 65'
CB	2	(Egypt) Amr Fahim		(substituted off) 25'
LB	16	(Egypt) Mohamed Nasef
RB	13	(Mozambique) Mano
CM	14	(Egypt) Mohamed Shaaban
CM	26	(Egypt) Mohamed Sobhy
AM	10	(Egypt) Adel Mostafa
CF	17	(Egypt) Ahmed Raouf	(yellow card) ?'	(substituted off) 88'
CF	9	(Egypt) Ahmed Abd El-Zaher	(yellow card) ?'
Substitutions:
CB	24	(Egypt) Hussein Ali	(yellow card) ?'	(substituted in) 25'
CB	8	(Egypt) Ramy Sabry		(substituted in) 65'
FW	28	(Egypt) Saleh Gomaa		(substituted in) 88'
Manager:
(Egypt) Mokhtar Mokhtar

Man of the Match:

Assistant referees:

Fourth official:
