= Mahir =

- Pronunciation: Arabic: [ˈmaː.hir] Turkish: [ˈmɑ.hiɾ]
- Gender: Male

Origin
- Origin: Arabic
- Meaning: skilled, expert

Mahir (also spelled Maher or "Mihir-A", Arabic: ماهر) is an Arabic given name meaning "skilled" or "expert". Notable people with the name include:

== Given name ==
- Mahir Agva (born 1996), German basketball player
- Mahir Alkaya (born 1988), Dutch politician
- Mahir Amiraslanov (born 1997), Azerbaijani wrestler
- Mahir Çağrı (born 1962), Turkish Internet celebrity
- Mahir Çayan (1946–1972), Turkish communist leader
- Mahir Darziev (born 1957), Georgian politician
- Mahir Domi (1915–2000), Albanian linguist
- Mahir Emreli (born 1997), Azerbaijani footballer
- Mahir Ünsal Eriş (born 1980), Turkish writer
- Mahir Günok (born 1963), Turkish footballer
- Mahir Habib (born 1977), Iraqi footballer
- Mahir Halili (born 1975), Albanian footballer
- Mahir Hassan (born 1963), Iraqi-Kurdish actor
- Mahir Iftić (born 1980), Bosnian footballer
- Mahir Jasarević (born 1992), Hungarian footballer
- Mahir Jasem (born 1989), Emirati footballer
- Mahir Karić (born 1992), Bosnian footballer
- Mahir Muradov (1956–2023), Azerbaijani judge
- Mahir Oral (born 1980), German boxer
- Mahir ul Qadri (1906–1978), Pakistani religious writer, poet, and novelist
- Mahir Sağlık (born 1983), Turkish footballer
- Mahir Savranlıoğlu (born 1986), Turkish footballer
- Mahir Shukurov (born 1982), Azerbaijani footballer
- Mahir Tomruk (1885–1949), Turkish sculptor
- Mahir Ünal (born 1966), Turkish politician
- Mahir Ünlü (1926–2017), Turkish author
- Mahir Yağcılar (born 1961), Turkish Kosovar politician
- Mahir Yousef (born 1988), Qatari footballer
- Mahir Zeynalov, Azerbaijanian-American journalist
- Mahir al-Zubaydi (died 2008), al-Qaeda military commander

== Middle name ==
- Ahmad Maher Pasha (1888–1945), Egyptian politician, Prime Minister of Egypt 1944–1945
- Aly Maher Pasha (1882–1960), Egyptian politician

== See also ==
- Maher (disambiguation)
  - Maher (surname), including the Arabic surname
    - Ahmad Maher (disambiguation), various people
- Mahershala Ali, American actor
