= Maher (surname) =

Maher is usually a surname. It is derived from the Irish surname Ó Meachair, but is widely found in Arabic (ماهر).

== People ==
Alphabetically:

- Adam Maher (born 1993), Dutch-Moroccan footballer
- Ahmad or Ahmed Maher, several people, including:
  - Ahmad Maher (diplomat) (1935–2010), Egyptian diplomat
  - Ahmad Maher (director), Egyptian film director
  - Ahmad Maher (footballer) (born 1990), Egyptian footballer
  - Ahmad Mahir Pasha (1888–1945), Prime Minister of Egypt, grandfather of the above
  - Ahmad Maher Wridat (born 1991), Palestinian football player
  - Ahmed Maher (youth leader) (born 1980), co-founder of the April 6 Youth Movement in Egypt
- Ali Maher (diplomat) (1938–2016), Egyptian diplomat
- Alice Maher (born 1956), Irish painter and sculptor
- Allan Maher (born 1950), Australian football player
- Andrew Maher (born 1964), Australian sports journalist and broadcaster
- Ben Maher (born 1983), British show jumper
- Big Joe Maher (born c.1953), American blues drummer, singer and songwriter
- Bill Maher (born 1956), American comedian and late-night talk show host
- Bill Maher (rower) (born 1946), American rower
- Brendan Maher (disambiguation), several people, including:
  - Brendan Maher (born 1989), Irish name Breandán Ó Meachair, Irish hurler
  - Brendan Maher (director), director of Australian TV series
  - Brendan Maher (psychologist) (1924–2009), professor at Harvard University
  - Brendan Maher (Roscrea hurler) (born 1949), Irish name Breandán Ó Meachair, Irish hurler
- Brett Maher (American football) (born 1989), American gridiron football player
- Brett Maher (basketball) (born 1973), Australian basketball player
- Carmel Maher (born 1954), Australian politician
- Christopher Maher (born 1955), American actor and chef
- Ciarán Maher (1962–2012), Irish name Ciarán Ó Meachair, Irish Gaelic footballer
- Ciaron Maher (born 1981), Australian thoroughbred racehorse trainer
- Davie Maher (1880–1936), English footballer
- Denis Maher (born 1991), Irish name Denis Ó Meachair, Irish hurler
- Edwin Maher, New Zealand-born TV journalist
- Frank Maher (disambiguation), several people
- Fred Maher (born 1964), American drummer, programmer, and record producer
- George Ciccariello-Maher (born 1979), American political theorist
- George W. Maher (1864–1926), American architect
- Greg Maher (1967–2016), Irish name Gréagóir Ó Meachair, Irish Gaelic footballer
- Ilona Maher (born 1996), American rugby bronze medalist
- Irene Maher, Australian artist who worked with Vivienne Binns in the 1990s
- James or Jimmy Maher, several people, including:
  - James Maher (hurler) (born 1995), Irish name Séamus Ó Meachair, Irish hurler
  - James J. Maher, American Catholic priest and president of Niagara University
  - James Joseph Maher (1888–1964), New Zealand politician of the National Party
  - James P. Maher (1865–1946), U.S. Representative from New York
  - Jimmy Maher (born 1974), Australian cricketer
  - Jimmy Maher (footballer) (1913–1977), Australian rules footballer
  - Jimmy Maher (hurler), Irish hurler
- John Maher (also Johnny, Jonathan), several people, including:
  - John Maher (Buzzcocks drummer) (born 1960), British drummer and drag racer
  - John Maher (Kilkenny hurler) (born 1977), Irish name Seán Ó Meachair, Irish hurler
  - John Maher (Tipperary hurler) (1908–1980), Irish name Seán Ó Meachair, Irish hurler
  - John A. Maher, American politician
  - John C. Maher (born 1951), Irish-British linguist
  - John W. Maher (1866–1917), American politician and veterinarian
  - Johnny Marr (born 1963), born John Martin Maher, English guitarist for The Smiths
  - Jonathan Maher (born 1985), Irish name Seán Ó Meachair, Irish hurler
- Joseph Maher (1933–1998), Irish-American character actor
- Kaitlyn Maher (born 2004), American singer and actress
- Katherine Maher (born 1983), American executive director of the Wikimedia Foundation
- Kevin Maher (born 1976), English-born Irish footballer
- Margaret Maher (1841–1924), Irish-born domestic worker for Emily Dickinson
- Mark Anthony Maher (born 1974), better known by his stage name Kram, is an Australian musician
- Matt Maher (born 1974), Canadian Christian music songwriter and worship leader
- Matty Maher (1854–1931), Irish name Maitiú Ó Meachair, Irish hurler
- Maureen Maher, American news reporter
- Michael Maher (also Mikey), several people, including:
  - Michael Maher (Australian politician) (1936–2013), Member of Parliament from 1982–1987
  - Michael Maher (hurler) (1930–2017), Irish name Mícheál Ó Meachair, Irish hurler
  - Michael Whalen Maher (1830–1905), architect, builder and politician in New Brunswick
  - Mikey Maher (1870–1947), Irish hurler
- Nicholas Maher (died 1851), Irish politician
- Osama Ali Maher (born 1968), Egyptian-born Swedish politician and MP
- Patrick Maher (also Pádraic, Pat), several people, including:
  - Pádraic Maher (born 1989), Irish name Pádraic Ó Meachair, Irish hurler
  - Pat Maher "Fox" (1872–1933), Irish hurler
  - Patrick Maher (hurler) "Bonner" (born 1989), Irish name Pádraig Ó Meachair, Irish hurler
  - Patrick Maher (Irish republican) (1889–1921), IRA member executed in Mountjoy Prison
- Paul Maher, several people, including:
  - Paul Maher Jr. (born 1963), American author, book critic, photographer and filmmaker
  - Paul Maher (footballer) (born 1976), Australian rules footballer
  - Paul Maher (Moyne-Templetuohy hurler) (born 1994), Irish name Pól Ó Meachair, Irish hurler
- Peter Maher (also Peadar), several people, including:
  - Peadar Maher (1924–2012), Irish politician
  - Peter Maher (boxer) (1869–1940), Irish-American bare-knuckle boxer
  - Peter Maher (hurler) (1872–1947), Irish name Peadar Ó Meachair, Irish hurler
  - Peter Maher (runner) (born 1960), Canadian marathon runner
  - Peter Maher (sportscaster) (born 1949), Canadian sportscaster
- Philip Maher (born 1979), Irish hurler
- Philip Brooks Maher, American architect
- Richard Maher, British screenwriter and producer
- Robyn Maher (born 1959), Australian basketball player
- Ronan Maher (born 1995), Irish name Rónán Ó Meachair, Irish hurler
- Sanam Maher, Pakistani journalist and feminist
- Sean Maher (born 1975), American actor
- Sean Maher (swimmer) (born 1953), British swimmer
- Shaun Maher (born 1978), Irish footballer
- Shiraz Maher (born 1981), British writer, critic of radical Islam
- Stephen Maher (footballer) (born 1988), Irish footballer
- Stephen Maher (hurler) "Picky" (born 1993), Irish name Stiofán Ó Meachair, Irish hurler
- T. J. Maher (1922–2002), full name Thomas Joseph Maher, Irish politician
- Ted Maher (born 1958), American arson, ex-Green Beret, and registered nurse
- Ted Maher (politician) (1891–1982), Australian politician
- Therese Maher, Irish name Treasa Ní Meachair, Irish camogie player
- Tom Maher (born 1952), Australian basketball coach
- Tommy Maher (1922–2015), Irish name Tomás Ó Meachair, Catholic priest and hurler
- Tony Maher (born 1945), Irish name Antoin Ó Meachair, Irish hurler
- Wally Maher (1908–1951), American actor
- Warren Maher (born 1957), Australian tennis player
- William Maher (hurler) (born 1979), Irish name Liam Ó Meachair, Irish hurler and coach
