= Maher =

Maher may refer to:

== Name ==
- Maher (given name), an Arabic given name
- Maher (surname), list of people with the name

== Places ==
- Maher Island, an Antarctic island
- Maher, Colorado, an unincorporated community in the United States
- Maher, West Virginia, an unincorporated community in the United States
- Maher Building, a historic building in Florida, United States
- Mahers, Newfoundland and Labrador, a settlement in Canada

== Other uses ==
- Maher Cup, an Australian rugby league football trophy
- Maher (NGO), an Indian non-profit organization
- Maher (community), a social group of India
- Maher (god), an Aksumite god
- Maher v. Roe, United States Supreme Court decision

== See also ==
- Waltons Stores (Interstate) Ltd v Maher, leading case in Australian contract law
- Maher v. Town Council of Portland, Canadian constitutional law court decision dealing with the constitutional guarantees for denominational schools
- Mehr (disambiguation)
- Mahar (tribe) of Sindh and Punjab, Pakistan
- Mahir or Maher, Arabic given name
