= James Maher =

James Maher may refer to:

- Jimmy Maher (born 1974), Australian cricketer
- Jimmy Maher (politician) (1888–1964), New Zealand politician of the National Party
- James P. Maher (1865–1946), U.S. Representative from New York
- James J. Maher, Catholic priest and president of Niagara University
- James Maher (hurler) (born 1995), Irish hurler for Kilkenny
- James Maher (cleric), Irish-born Roman Catholic priest
- Jimmy Maher (footballer) (1913–1977), Australian footballer
- Jimmy Maher (hurler), Irish hurler

== See also ==
- Hugh James Maher (1910–2001), politician in Saskatchewan, Canada
- James Marr (disambiguation)
