= Mahers =

Mahers may refer to:

- Mahers, Newfoundland and Labrador, a settlement in Canada
- Maher people, a social group of India

== See also ==
- Maher (disambiguation)
