= List of ambassadors from Egypt =

This is a list of ambassadors from Egypt to other countries in 2006–2010. Some are updated (2026).

Host country	Location	Ambassador	Ref.
Afghanistan	Kabul	Karim Omar Sharaf	
Albania	Tirana	Amina Imam Gomaa	
Algeria	Algiers	Abdel Aziz Shawky Seif El Nasr	
Andorra	Andorra la Vella	Ayman A. Zaineldine	
Angola	Luanda	Nevein El Husseiny	
Argentina	Buenos Aires	Yasser Mahmoud Abed	
Armenia	Yerevan	Wahid Galal	
Australia	Canberra	Omar Metwalli Mohamed	
Austria	Vienna	Malek Bayoumi Kotb	
Azerbaijan	Baku	Adel I.A. Ibrahim	
Bahrain	Manama	Mohamed Ashraf Harbi Salama	
Bangladesh	Dhaka	Fayez Mustafa Abdel Meguid Nosseir	
Belarus	Minsk	Refer to: Russia	
Belgium	Brussels	Fatma El Zahraa	
Benin	Porto-Novo	Osama Tawfik Badr	
Bolivia	La Paz	Mohamed Ibrahim Metwalli	
Bosnia and Herzegovina	Sarajevo	Ahmed Ahmed El Sayed Khattab	
Botswana	Gaborone	Refer to: South Africa	
Brazil	Brasília	Alaa El-Din Wagih Mohamed Roushdy	
Brunei	Bandar Seri Begawan	Refer to: Malaysia	
Bulgaria	Sofia	Moayad Eldalie	
Burkina Faso	Ouagadougou	Mohamed Mamdouh Ali El Ashmawy	
Burundi	Bujumbura	Mohamed Abdel Kader	
Cambodia	Phnom Penh	Refer to: Thailand	
Cameroon	Yaoundé	Mohamed Sa'ad Mohamed Akl	
Canada	Ottawa	Shamel El Sayed Nasser	
Cape Verde	Praia	Refer to: Senegal	
Central African Republic	Bangui	Dalia Fayez	
Chad	N'Djamena	Khaled Abdullah Shehata	
Chile	Santiago	Hazem Ahdy Khairat	
China	Beijing	Ahmed Rezk	
Colombia	Bogotá	Tarek Elkouny	
Comoros	Moroni	Refer to: Tanzania	
Republic of Congo	Brazzaville	Khaled Omran	
D.R. Congo	Kinshasa	Hisham El Makoud	
Croatia	Zagreb	Iman Mohamed Zaky Moharram	
Cuba	Havana	Abdel Fatah Ezz El Din	
Cyprus	Nicosia	Ahmed Ibrahim Tawfik Ragheb	
Czech Republic	Prague	Amal Mustafa Mohamed Murad	
Denmark	Copenhagen	Medhat Mohamed Kamal El Meligy	
Djibouti	Djibouti City	Farghaly Abdel Halim Taha	
Dominican Republic	Santo Domingo	Refer to: Cuba	
Ecuador	Quito	Hisham Omar Abdel Hakim Marzouk	
El Salvador	San Salvador	George Kamel Beshay	
Equatorial Guinea	Malabo	Refer to: Cameroon	
Eritrea	Asmara	Ihab Imam Hamouda	
Estonia	Tallinn	Refer to: Finland	
Ethiopia	Addis Ababa	Tarek Abdel Moneim Ghoneim	
Fiji	Suva	Refer to: Australia	
Finland	Helsinki	Maa'soum Mustafa Marzouk	
France	Paris	Nasser Ahmed Kamel	
Gabon	Libreville	Seif Allah Youssef Kandil	
Gambia	Banjul	Refer to: Senegal	
Germany	Berlin	Ramzy Ezz El Din Ramzy	
Ghana	Accra	Omar Ahmed Abdelwahab Selim	
Greece	Athens	Hamdy Sanad Loza	
Grenada	St. George's	Refer to: Venezuela	
Guatemala	Guatemala City	Maher Ibrahim Youssef Baddar	
Guinea	Conakry	Mohamed Hafez Mustafa Mohamed	
Guinea Bissau	Bissau	Refer to: Guinea	
Haiti	Port-au-Prince	Refer to: Panama	
Honduras	Tegucigalpa	Refer to: Guatemala	
Hungary	Budapest	Hisham El Zimaity	
Iceland	Reykjavík	Refer to: Norway	
India	New Delhi	Wael Hamed	
Indonesia	Jakarta	Ahmed Mohamed El Sayed El Kowessni	
Iran	Tehran	Amr Ahmed Abdel Meguid El Zayat	
Iraq	Baghdad	Sherif Mohamed Shahin	
Ireland	Dublin	Soha Gendi	
Israel	Tel Aviv	Yasser Reda Ali Abdullah Said	
Italy	Rome	Mohamed Farid Monib	
Ivory Coast	Yamoussoukro	Sherif Youssef Abbas Soliman	
Jamaica	Kingston	Refer to: Cuba	
Japan	Tokyo	Ayman Kamel	
Jordan	Amman	Amr Abdel Latif Abdel Hamid	
Kazakhstan	Astana	Abdullah Omar El-Arnousy	
Kenya	Nairobi	Saher Tawfik Hamza	
Kuwait	Kuwait City	Taher Ahmed Farahat	
Laos	Vientiane	Refer to: Vietnam	
Latvia	Riga	William George Abadir	
Lebanon	Beirut	Ahmed Fuad El Badawy	
Lesotho	Maseru	Refer to: South Africa	
Liberia	Monrovia	Omar Abdel Aziz El Sheemy	
Libya	Tripoli	Mohamed Ibrahim El Nokaly	
Lithuania	Vilnius	Refer to: Denmark	
Luxembourg	Luxembourg	Refer to: Belgium	
Macedonia	Skopje	N/A	
Madagascar	Antananarivo	Maged Fuad Saleh Fuad	
Malawi	Lilongwe	Akram Mohsen Hamdy	
Malaysia	Kuala Lumpur	Hany Abdul Kader Shalash	
Maldives	Male	Malek Bayoumi Kotb	
Mali	Bamako	Hamed Ahmed Shokry Hamed	
Malta	Valletta	Abdel Mawgoud Ahmed El Habashy	
Marshall Islands	Majuro	Refer to: Australia	
Mauritania	Nouakchott	Bahaa El Din Mokhtar Mowafi	
Mauritius	Port Louis	Bakry Rushdy El Amry	
Mexico	Mexico City	Ibrahim Ahdy Khairat	
Moldova	Chișinău	Refer to: Romania	
Mongolia	Ulaanbaatar	Abdallah Sherif Azab	
Morocco	Rabat	Achraf I. A. Ibrahim	
Mozambique	Maputo	El Sayed Abdel Kader Tantawy	
Myanmar	Yangon	Youssef Kamal Hanna	
Namibia	Windhoek	Mohamed Hady El Tunsi	
Nepal	Kathmandu	Abdel Hamid Mahmoud Soliman	
Netherlands	The Hague	Ahmed Amin Fathallah	
New Zealand	Wellington	George Adel Samuel	
Nicaragua	Managua	Refer to: Panama	
Niger	Niamey	Mohamed Mahmoud Mustafa El Ashmawy	
Nigeria	Abuja	Sherif Fuad Mustafa Naguib	
North Korea	Pyongyang	Ismail Abdel Rahman Ghoneim	
Norway	Oslo	Tamer Abdel Aziz Abdullah Khalil	
Oman	Muscat	Ezz El Din Ahmed Fahmy	
Pakistan	Islamabad	Magdy Mahmoud Helmy Amer	
Palestine	Ramallah	Ashraf Abdel Wahab Mohamed Akl	
Panama	Panama City	Reda Halim Fahmy Ibrahim	
Papua New Guinea	Port Moresby	Refer to: Indonesia	
Paraguay	Asunción	Ashraf Milad Wassef	
Peru	Lima	Hisham Mohamed Abbas Khalil	
Philippines	Manila	Ahmed Maher Abass	
Poland	Warsaw	Fahmy Ahmed Fayed	
Portugal	Lisbon	Amgad Maher Abdel Ghaffar	
Qatar	Doha	Mohamed Galal Daoud	
Romania	Bucharest	Sanaa Ismail Atallah	
Russia	Moscow	Alaa Shawki El-Hadidy	
Rwanda	Kigali	Ahmed Ramy Awad El Husseiny	
San Marino	City of San Marino	Refer to: Italy	
São Tomé and Príncipe	São Tomé	Refer to: Angola	
Saudi Arabia	Riyadh	Nasser Hamdy	
Senegal	Dakar	Mohamed Gamal El Din Eleish	
Serbia	Belgrade	Adel Ahmed Mohamed Naguib	
Seychelles	Victoria, Seychelles	Refer to: Kenya	
Sierra Leone	Freetown	Mahmoud Yehia Ezzat	
Singapore	Singapore	Mohamed Ahmed Fathi Abulkheir	
Slovakia	Bratislava	Hassan Mahmoud El Lethy	
Slovenia	Ljubljana	Ahmed Faruk Mohamed Tawfik	
Somalia	Mogadishu	Said Mohamed Morsi Fahmy	
South Africa	Pretoria	Mohamed Badr El Din Mustafa Zayed	
South Korea	Seoul	Mohamed Reda Kamel	
Spain	Madrid	Ayman A. Zaineldine	
Suriname	Paramaribo	Refer to: Brazil	
Sudan	Khartoum	Affifi El Sayed Ahmed Abd El Wahab	
Sri Lanka	Colombo	Jihan Amin Mohamed Ali	
Swaziland	Lobamba	Hamdy Abdel Rehim Saleh	
Sweden	Stockholm	Wael Nasr	
Switzerland	Bern	Magdy Galal Sha'arawy	
Syria	Damascus	Shawky Ismail Ali Soliman	
Tajikistan	Dushanbe	Tarek Mahmoud Ibrahim Ali	
Tanzania	Dar es Salaam	Wael Adel Abdel Azim Nasr	
Togo	Lomé	Mohamed Karim Fouad Sherif	
Trinidad and Tobago	Port of Spain	Refer to: Venezuela	
Tunisia	Tunis	Ayman Gamal El Din Mousharafa	
Turkey	Ankara	Mohamed Alaa El Din Ali El Hadidy	
Turkmenistan	Ashgabat	Raouf Abdel Moneim El Haddad	
Uganda	Kampala	Reda Abdel Rahman Bebars	
Ukraine	Kyiv	Youssef Moustafa Zada	
United Arab Emirates	Abu Dhabi	Mohamed Saad Ebeid	
United Kingdom	London	Mohamed Ashraf El Kholy	
United States	Washington, D.C.	Sameh Hassan Shokry Selim	
Uruguay	Montevideo	Mohamed Amin Taha	
Uzbekistan	Tashkent	Nadya Ibrahim Kafafi	
Vatican City	Vatican City	Lamiaa Ali Hamuda	
Venezuela	Caracas	Essam Saleh Awad Mustafa	
Vietnam	Hanoi	Mohamed Alaa El Din Saad	
Western Samoa	Apia	Refer to: Australia	
Yemen	Sanaa	Mohamed Morsy Mohamed Awad	
Zambia	Lusaka	Ahmed Mostafa	
Zimbabwe	Harare	Gamil Said Ibrahim Fayed	
