= Maher (given name) =

Maher (Arabic: ماهر) is an Arabic given name meaning "skillful" or "talented" or "expert." In Arabic context, it is pronounced "Maa-her." Notable people with the name include:

== Given name ==
- Maher Abbas (born 1966), Lebanese-American colorectal surgeon and former athlete
- Maher El-Adawy (born 1964), Egyptian diplomat
- Maher al-Agal (died 2022), Syrian ISIS commander
- Maher Ameur (born 1987), Tunisian footballer
- Maher Arar (born 1970), Syrian-Canadian telecommunications engineer
- Maher al-Assad (born 1967), Syrian general and commander of the Republican Guard
- Maher al-Sharaa (born 1973), Syrian politician and physician
- Maher Atta (born 1970), American footballer
- Maher Ayyad (born 1978), Bahraini chess player
- Maher El-Beheiry (born 1943), Egyptian politician
- Maher Ben Aziza (born 1980), Tunisian fencer
- Maher Berakdar (born 1968), Syrian footballer
- Maher Bitar, American government official
- Maher Bouallegue, Tunisian Paralympian athlete
- Maher Carrizo (born 2006), Argentine footballer
- Maher Charif, Palestinian Marxist historian
- Maher Ghanmi (born 1994), Tunisian wrestler
- Maher Guizani, Tunisian footballer
- Maher Hajjar (born 1968), Syrian politician
- Maher Hammam (born 1956), Egyptian footballer
- Maher Hamza, Egyptian fencing coach known as Mauro Hamza (born 1965/66)
- Maher Hannachi (born 1984), Tunisian footballer
- Maher Khalil al-Hasan, Syrian politician
- Maher Hasnaoui (born 1989), Tunisian cyclist
- Maher Hathout (1936–2015), American-Muslim community leader
- Maher Hawsawi (born 1992), Saudi footballer
- Maher Ben Hlima (born 1989), Polish-Tunisian racewalker
- Maher Jah (born 1990), Lebanese singer
- Maher Jamal, Syrian politician
- Maher Kanzari (born 1973), Tunisian footballer
- Maher Magri (born 1986), Tunisian footballer
- Maher Marwan, Syrian politician
- Maher Meshaal (1989–2015), Saudi Arabian munshid and Islamic State member
- Maher al-Mu'aiqly (born 1969), Saudi imam and preacher
- Maher Nasser (born 1962), Palestinian United Nations official
- Maher Othman (born 1991), Saudi footballer
- Maher Abd al-Rashid (1942–2014), Iraqi Army General during the Saddam Hussein rule
- Maher Ridane (born 1971), Tunisian javelin thrower
- Maher Abu Rmeileh (born 1983), Palestinian judoka
- Maher Sabra (born 1992), Lebanese footballer
- Maher Sabry (born 1967), Egyptian theater director, playwright, film director, producer and screenwriter, poet, writer
- Maher Al-Sayed (born 1979), Syrian footballer
- Maher al-Sharaa (born 1973), Syrian politician
- Maher Zain (born 1981), Arab-Swedish R&B singer, songwriter and music producer of Lebanese origin
- Maher Zdiri (born 1970), Tunisian footballer

== See also ==
- Maher (surname); can be of Arabic, Indian subcontinent, and Irish origin
