= Ahmed Magdy (footballer, born 1986) =

Egyptian footballer and coach

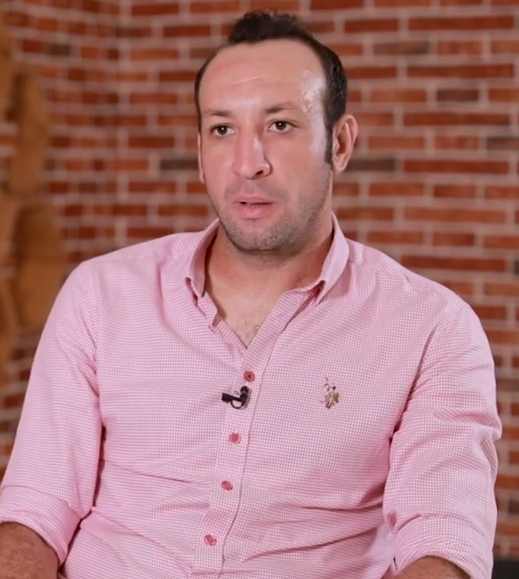
- Magdy in 2020

Personal information
- Full name: Ahmed Magdy el-Sayed el-Bahrawy
- Date of birth: 24 May 1986 (age 40)
- Place of birth: Zagazig, Sharqia, Egypt
- Height: 1.84 m (6 ft 0 in)
- Positions: Defensive midfielder; centre-back; libero

Team information
- Current team: Al Fateh (assistant coach)

Youth career
- –2005: Al Ahly

Senior career*
Years	Team	Apps	(Gls)
2005–2006	Panionios	31	(0)
2007	Atromitos	14	(0)
2007–2010	Zamalek	73	(5)
2010–2012	Al Masry	33	(0)
2012–2013	Zamalek	3	(0)
2013–2014	Wadi Degla	4	(0)
2014–2016	Al Assiouty	8	(1)
2016–2017	Samarra		
2017	Nogoom		
2017–2018	Wadi Degla		
- * Club domestic league appearances and goals ‡ National team caps and goals as of

Ahmed Magdy el-Sayed el-Bahrawy (Arabic: أحمد مجدي السيد البدراوي; born 24 May 1986) is an Egyptian football coach and a retired professional association football defender. He is currently the assistant coach of Al Fateh. He was previously appointed youth coach for Smouha in 2019. He played a variety of roles in the squad, including defensive midfield, center-back, and left-back.

== Club career ==
Magdy is a graduate of the Al Ahly youth academy. He joined the Super League Greece club Panionios on a free transfer before the 2005–06 season. In January 2007, he joined Atromitos in a player exchange, with ex-Atromitos player Rafik Djebbour going to Panionios.

In August 2007, Magdy transferred to Zamalek for 450,000 Euros from Atromitos.

In June 2010, Al-Masry won the services of both Magdy and Ahmed El Merghany in an exchange deal with Zamalek, who signed Mohamed Ashour El-Adham in return.

== Coaching career ==
Retiring at the end of the 2017–18 season, Magdy was hired by his former club, Zamalek SC, as a youth coach, after acquiring the FA Coaching Diploma. In the summer of 2019, he was hired by Smouha SC as a youth coach.

== Honours ==
=== Zamalek ===
- Egypt Cup: 2007–08
