= Mert Günok =

Turkish footballer (born 1989)

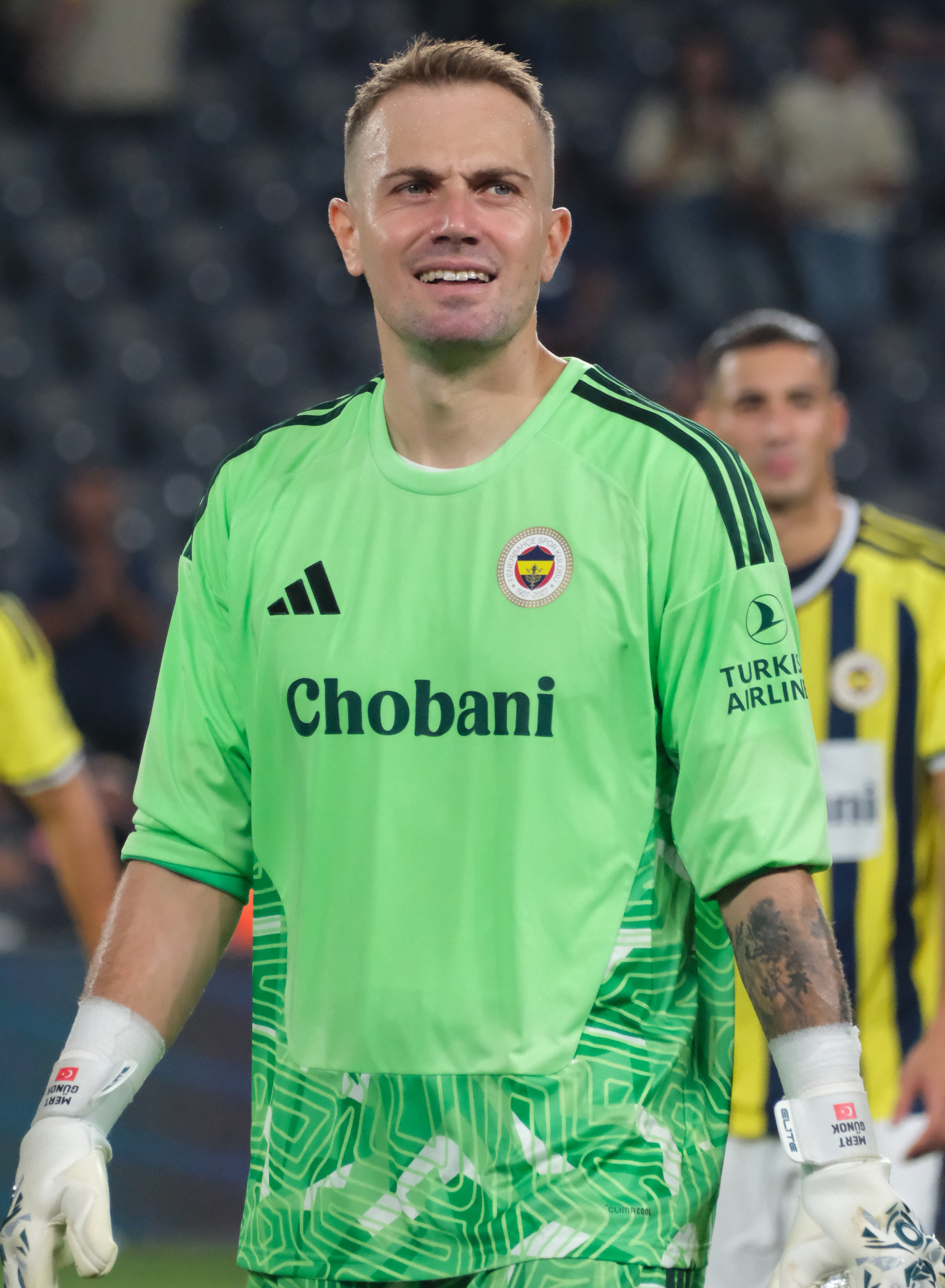
- Günok with Fenerbahçe in 2026

Personal information
- Full name: Fehmi Mert Günok
- Date of birth: 1 March 1989 (age 37)
- Place of birth: Karabük, Turkey
- Height: 1.96 m (6 ft 5 in)
- Position: Goalkeeper

Team information
- Current team: Fenerbahçe
- Number: 34

Youth career
- 2000–2001: Kocaelispor
- 2001–2009: Fenerbahçe

Senior career*
Years	Team	Apps	(Gls)
2008–2015	Fenerbahçe	25	(0)
2015–2017	Bursaspor	20	(0)
2017–2021	İstanbul Başakşehir	88	(0)
2021–2026	Beşiktaş	99	(0)
2026–	Fenerbahçe	5	(0)

International career^{‡}
2004–2005	Turkey U16	11	(0)
2005–2006	Turkey U17	5	(0)
2006–2007	Turkey U18	4	(0)
2007–2008	Turkey U19	10	(0)
2008	Turkey U20	1	(0)
2009	Turkey U21	3	(0)
2011–2012	Turkey B	2	(0)
2012–2024	Turkey	37	(0)
- * Club domestic league appearances and goals as of 17 May 2026 (UTC) ‡ National team caps and goals as of 19 November 2024 (UTC)

Fehmi Mert Günok (Turkish pronunciation: [mæɾt ˈɡynok]; born 1 March 1989) is a Turkish professional footballer who plays as a goalkeeper for Süper Lig club Fenerbahçe and the Turkey national team.

Günok started his youth career with a short spell in Kocaelispor and then joined Fenerbahçe in 2001, where he was eventually promoted to professional status and played at Süper Lig level, winning two league titles. He left Fenerbahçe in 2015 to join Bursaspor, where he played for two seasons. In 2017, he signed for İstanbul Başakşehir, where he attained a third Süper Lig title in the 2019–20 season.

Günok represent Turkey at international competitions to date, starting from under-16 level in 2004, and made his senior international debut in 2012. He was the first-choice goalkeeper of the national team during the UEFA Euro 2020 qualifying stage, in which they qualified for the finals, and was their starting goalkeeper at UEFA Euro 2024. He made a last-minute save to deny Christoph Baumgartner a goal in Turkey's match against Austria.

== Club career ==
=== Fenerbahçe ===
Günok started his football career with a short spell at youth level football at Kocaelispor between 2000 and 2001, which he described as "playing in couple of games while my father was working there", while Mahir, his father was employed as goalkeeping coach. Then, he was discovered by Fenerbahçe officials in 2001, in Istanbul, during a small field game and, joined the team where his first football license was issued. During his youth level career, he scored a goal from a penalty kick against Manisaspor in a PAF Ligi game, ended 2–0, on 9 March 2008.

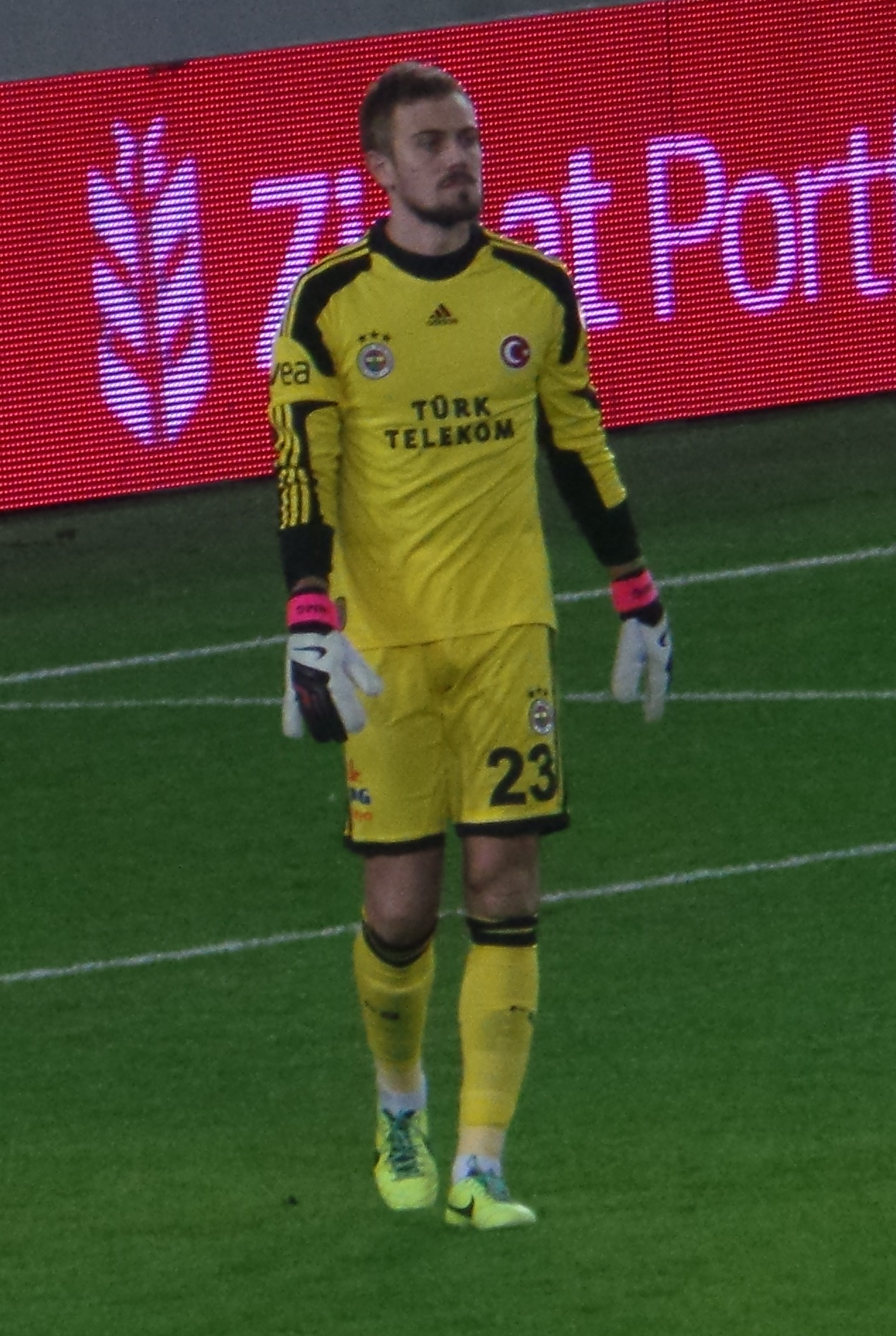
Günok in 2013–14 Turkish Cup encounter against Fethiyespor, on 4 December 2013

Günok signed his first professional contract before 2009–10 season. He was the third-choice goalkeeper, behind Volkan Demirel and Volkan Babacan of Fenerbahçe at 2010–11 season.

Günok made his Süper Lig debut against Antalyaspor on 15 August 2010, coming on as a substitute after Volkan Demirel got injured at the beginning of the second half, earning a clean sheet. Günok maintained his place in starting line-up in the following two Süper Lig encounters, respectively against Trabzonspor and Manisaspor, where he conceded five goals in total. During the home game against Trabzonspor, ended in a 3–2 loss, He saved the penalty shot of Argentine midfielder Gustavo Colman.

Günok was given a chance in starting line-up at mid-season exhibition match against Belgian side K.R.C. Genk, on 9 January 2013. Due to Volkan Demirel's penal absence, Günok was featured in starting line-up of 2013 Turkish Super Cup against Galatasaray S.K. and chosen "man of the match", although Fenerbahçe lost by 0–1 final score after extra time.

In 2014–15 season, Günok played three back-to-back Süper Lig games in September, respectively against Karabükspor, Trabzonspor and Gaziantepspor, and he saved 8 out of 10 attempts made by opponents in these encounters, during Volkan Demirel's penal absence. After 14 years spent at the club, Günok, at the age of 26, was released by Fenerbahçe, on 15 June 2015. During his last season, he played in nine Süper Lig and nine Turkish Cup encounters, conceded 19 goals in total.

=== Bursaspor ===
After being released by Fenerbahçe at the end of 2014–15 season, Günok joined Bursaspor, on a 3-season-long contract, on 22 June 2015. His contract was of €1.2 million salary per annum. Chosen as first-choice goalkeeper in the first half of the 2015–16 season, Günok was replaced by Harun Tekin from February on by decision of manager Hamza Hamzaoğlu, as he conceded 32 goals in 19 league games. In his second season at Bursaspor, he was deployed only in Turkish Cup encounters. At the end of season, his contract was cancelled in return of his outstanding wages from Bursaspor.

=== Başakşehir ===
On 31 July 2017, Günok joined İstanbul Başakşehir F.K. In his first season at Başakşehir, he was the second goalkeeper behind Volkan Babacan, his former teammate from Fenerbahçe, and deployed only at Turkish Cup games and UEFA Europa League.

He made his debut at Başakşehir on 30 November 2017, against Kahramanmaraşspor, at the fifth round game of Turkish Cup. Putting an improved individual display in pre-season trainings, he was given the starting line-up status by team manager Abdullah Avcı from 2018–19 season on. His first Süper Lig game with Başakşehir was against Trabzonspor, ended 2–0 for Başakşehir, at Fatih Terim Stadium, on 12 August 2018. Günok saved a penalty against Konyaspor on week 7 encounter of 2020–21 season, eventually ended 2–1 for Başakşehir's favour, on 1 November 2020. He missed 5 league games and was replaced by Volkan Babacan in December at 2020–21 season due to COVID-19 quarantine. Played as starter, he lost the 2020 Turkish Super Cup up against Trabzonspor, played on a postponed schedule due to COVID-19 pandemic, ended in a 2–1 loss, on 27 January 2021. Günok was released by club on 15 August 2021 in return of outstanding receivables of Günok.

=== Beşiktaş ===
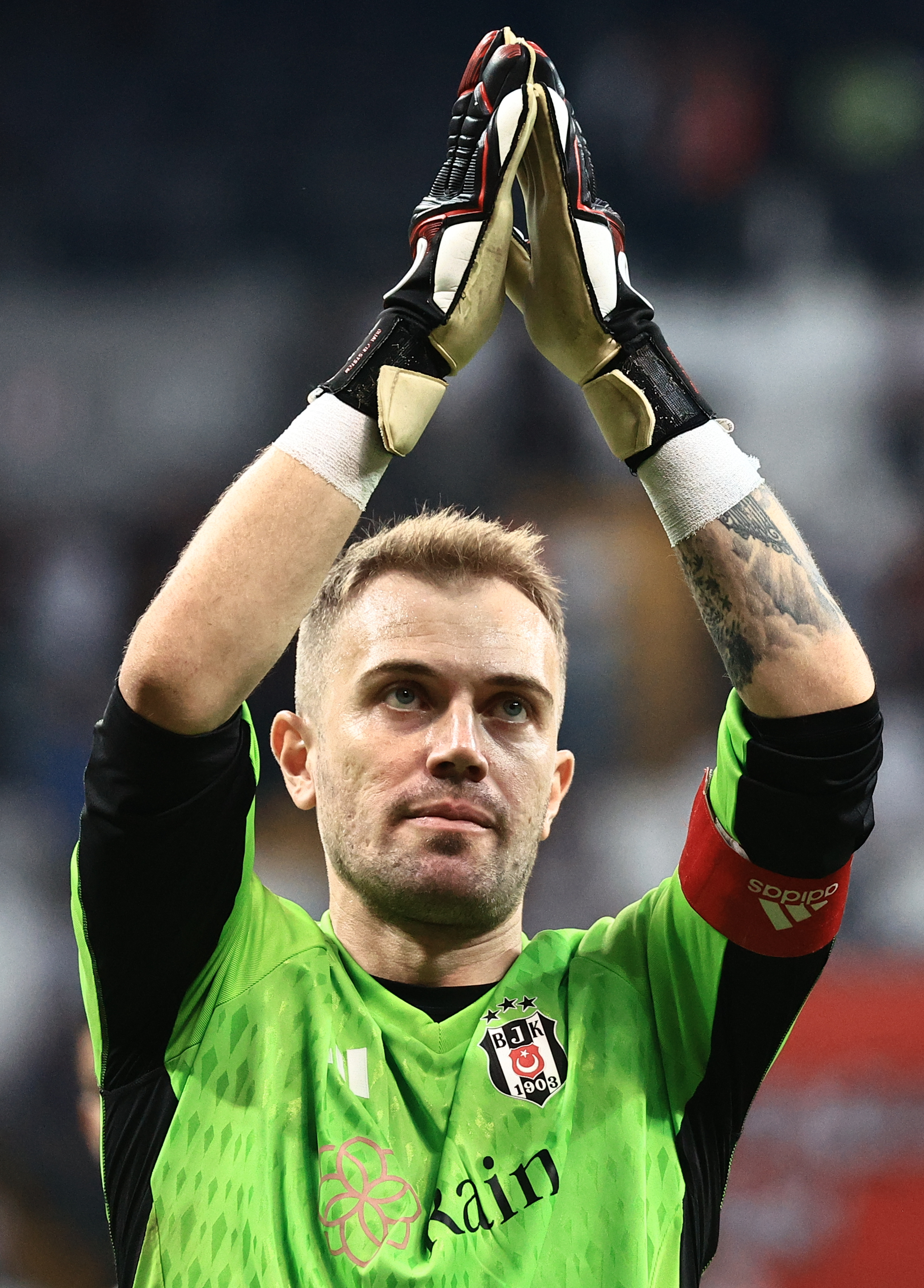
Günok with Beşiktaş in 2023

Günok joined Beşiktaş on a three-year contract, as the seventh transfer of the club during the transfer window, on 15 August 2021. On 18 September 2021, he made his debut with the team as a starter in a 3-2 away Süper Lig win against Antalyaspor. On 24 October 2021, he made his continental debut as a starter with Beşiktaş in UEFA Champions League match against Ajax.

On 31 July 2023, Günok signed a new two-year contract with Beşiktaş, keeping him at the club until 2025. On 17 January 2025, Günok had signed a new 2+1 year contract with Beşiktaş, keeping him at the club until 2027.

=== Return to Fenerbahçe ===
On 8 January 2026, he re-joined Fenerbahçe, signing a contract until the end of 2027–28 season.

== International career ==
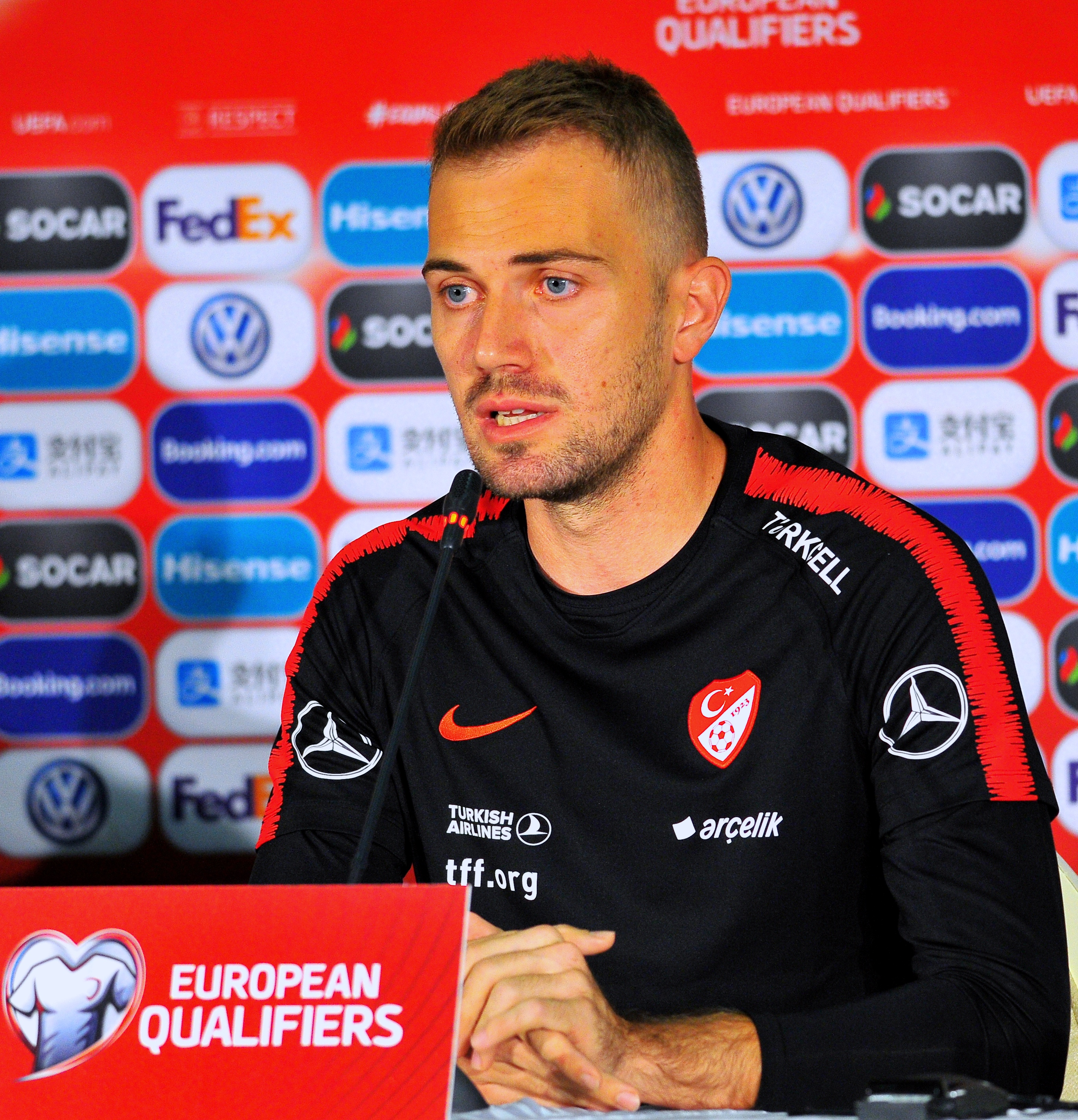
Günok at press-conference with Turkey in 2019

Substitited in 62nd minute following the injury of starter Cenk Gönen, Günok earned his first senior cap during a friendly game against Georgia on 25 May 2012, ended 3–1 to Turkey, held at Red Bull Arena, Salzburg, Austria.

On 8 June 2019, he kept a clean sheet against defending world champions France in a 2–0 win at a Group H encounter during the UEFA Euro 2020 qualifying stage. Conceding 3 goals in 10 games, Günok was the main choice goalkeeper of Turkey, which put their best defensive performance ever at qualifying phases of UEFA European Championship, under management of Şenol Güneş. He was called-up for the extended 30-men-squad ahead of UEFA Euro 2020 by Şenol Güneş, announced on 14 May 2021.

On 7 June 2024, he was named in Turkey's 26-man squad for UEFA Euro 2024. In their round of 16 match against Austria on 2 July, he made a crucial save, diving to his right to stop a header by Christoph Baumgartner in stoppage time, securing his country's 2–1 victory and qualification to the quarter-finals.

On 2 June 2026, Günok was selected in the 26-man squad for the 2026 FIFA World Cup.

== Personal life ==
Mert Günok was born in 1989 in Karabük, Turkey, while his father Mahir Günok was playing at Karabükspor. His mother Necmiye died in 2011, following an undisclosed disease.

Günok married Aslı Günok (née: Dalgalıdere) in Bursa, in 2015. The couple welcomed their first child, named Alâ, in 2019. In 2020, he donated 100 pairs of goalkeeper gloves to 100 schools across Turkey.

== Career statistics ==
=== Club ===
As of match played 11 August 2026

Appearances and goals by club, season and competition
Club	Season	League			Turkish Cup		Europe		Other		Total	
Club	Season	Division	Apps	Goals	Apps	Goals	Apps	Goals	Apps	Goals	Apps	Goals
Fenerbahçe	2008–09	Süper Lig	0	0	0	0	0	0	—		1	0
Fenerbahçe	2009–10	Süper Lig	0	0	1	0	0	0	0	0	1	0
Fenerbahçe	2010–11	Süper Lig	3	0	2	0	0	0	—		5	0
Fenerbahçe	2011–12	Süper Lig	2	0	4	0	—		—		6	0
Fenerbahçe	2012–13	Süper Lig	6	0	4	0	3 (Note: Two appearances in UEFA Champions League, one appearance in UEFA Europa League)	0	1 (Note: Appearance in Turkish Super Cup)	0	14	0
Fenerbahçe	2013–14	Süper Lig	5	0	1	0	0	0	1	0	7	0
Fenerbahçe	2014–15	Süper Lig	9	0	9	0	—		—		18	0
Fenerbahçe	Total		25	0	21	0	3	0	2	0	51	0
Bursaspor	2015–16	Süper Lig	20	0	2	0	—		1	0	23	0
Bursaspor	2016–17	Süper Lig	0	0	7	0	—		—		7	0
Bursaspor	Total		20	0	9	0	—		1	0	30	0
İstanbul Başakşehir	2017–18	Süper Lig	0	0	4	0	4 (Note: Appearances in UEFA Europa League)	0	—		8	0
İstanbul Başakşehir	2018–19	Süper Lig	34	0	0	0	2	0	—		36	0
İstanbul Başakşehir	2019–20	Süper Lig	33	0	0	0	12 (Note: Two appearances in UEFA Champions League, ten appearances in UEFA Europa League)	0	—		45	0
İstanbul Başakşehir	2020–21	Süper Lig	21	0	1	0	6 (Note: Appearances in UEFA Champions League)	0	1	0	29	0
İstanbul Başakşehir	Total		88	0	5	0	24	0	1	0	118	0
Beşiktaş	2021–22	Süper Lig	4	0	0	0	1	0	0	0	5	0
Beşiktaş	2022–23	Süper Lig	23	0	1	0	—		—		24	0
Beşiktaş	2023–24	Süper Lig	30	0	6	0	9 (Note: Appearances in UEFA Europa Conference League)	0	—		45	0
Beşiktaş	2024–25	Süper Lig	34	0	1	0	7	0	1	0	43	0
Beşiktaş	2025–26	Süper Lig	8	0	0	0	5 (Note: Two appearances in UEFA Europa League, three appearances in UEFA Conference League)	0	—		13	0
Beşiktaş	Total		99	0	8	0	22	0	1	0	130	0
Fenerbahçe	2025–26	Süper Lig	5	0	3	0	0	0	0	0	8	0
Fenerbahçe	2026–27	Süper Lig	0	0	0	0	4	0	0	0	4	0
Fenerbahçe	Fenerbahçe Total		30	0	24	0	7	0	2	0	63	0
Career total			237	0	46	0	53	0	5	0	341	0

=== International ===
As of match played 19 November 2024

Appearances and goals by national team and year
National team	Year	Apps	Goals
Turkey
Turkey	2012	4	0
Turkey	2013	1	0
Turkey	2015	1	0
Turkey	2019	9	0
Turkey	2020	6	0
Turkey	2021	1	0
Turkey	2023	5	0
Turkey	2024	10	0
Total		37	0

== Honours ==
Fenerbahçe

- Süper Lig: 2010–11, 2013–14
- Turkish Cup: 2011–12, 2012–13
- Turkish Super Cup: 2009, 2014, 2025

İstanbul Başakşehir

- Süper Lig: 2019–20

Beşiktaş

- Turkish Cup: 2023–24
- Turkish Super Cup: 2021, 2024

Individual

- Süper Lig Goalkeeper of the Season: 2018–19
- Süper Lig Team of the Season: 2018–19, 2022–23
