= James Marr =

James Marr may refer to:

- James Marr (biologist) (1902–1965), Scottish marine biologist and polar explorer
- James Marr (author) (1918–2009), historian of Guernsey

== See also ==
- James Maher (disambiguation)
