= Brendan Maher (disambiguation) =

Brendan Maher (born 1989) is an Irish hurler.

Brendan Maher may also refer to:

- Brendan Maher (Roscrea hurler) (born 1949), Irish hurler
- Brendan Maher (psychologist) (1924–2009), American psychologist
- Brendan Maher (director), director of Australian TV series
