= FA Coaching Diploma =

The FA Coaching Diploma is coaching certification accredited by the Football Association (FA) in England. The FA recognises the diploma as being equivalent to the UEFA Pro Licence.
