= Mahir Günok =

Turkish footballer and coach (born 1963)

Personal information
- Full name: Mahir Günok
- Date of birth: 14 March 1963 (age 63)
- Place of birth: Ereğli, Konya, Turkey
- Position: Goalkeeper

Senior career*
Years	Team	Apps	(Gls)
1988–1991	Karabükspor	56	(0)
1991–1992	Trabzonspor	1	(0)
1992–1995	İstanbulspor	55	(0)
1995–1996	Küçükçekmece S.K.	8	(0)
1996	Balıkesirspor	17	(0)
1996–1997	Zeytinburnuspor	3	(0)
Total		140	(0)

Managerial career
- 1998: Adana Demirspor (goalkeeping coach)
- 1999–2001: Kocaelispor (goalkeeping coach)
- 2001: Diyarbakırspor
- 2002–2003: Kocaelispor (goalkeeping coach)
- 2003–2004: Elazığspor (goalkeeping coach)
- 2005: Akçaabat Sebatspor (goalkeeping coach)
- 2005–2006: Çaykur Rizespor (goalkeeping coach)
- 2006–2009: İstanbul BB (goalkeeping coach)
- 2010: Diyarbakırspor (goalkeeping coach)
- * Club domestic league appearances and goals

Mahir Günok (born 14 March 1963) is a Turkish former association football player and coach.

== Personal life ==
Mahir Günok is the father of Turkish international Mert Günok, who plays at Beşiktaş Jimnastik Kulübü as of 2023–24 Süper Lig season.

== Honours ==
Trabzonspor

- Turkish Cup (1): 1991–92
