= Fouad Gamil =

Egyptian footballer (born 1897)

Personal information
- Full name: Mahmoud Fouad El-Gamil
- Date of birth: 1897

Youth career
- Zamalek

Senior career*
Years	Team	Apps	(Gls)
- Zamalek

International career
- Egypt
- * Club domestic league appearances and goals

Fouad Gamil (born 1897, date of death unknown) was an Egyptian footballer. He competed in the men's tournament at the 1924 Summer Olympics.

== Career ==
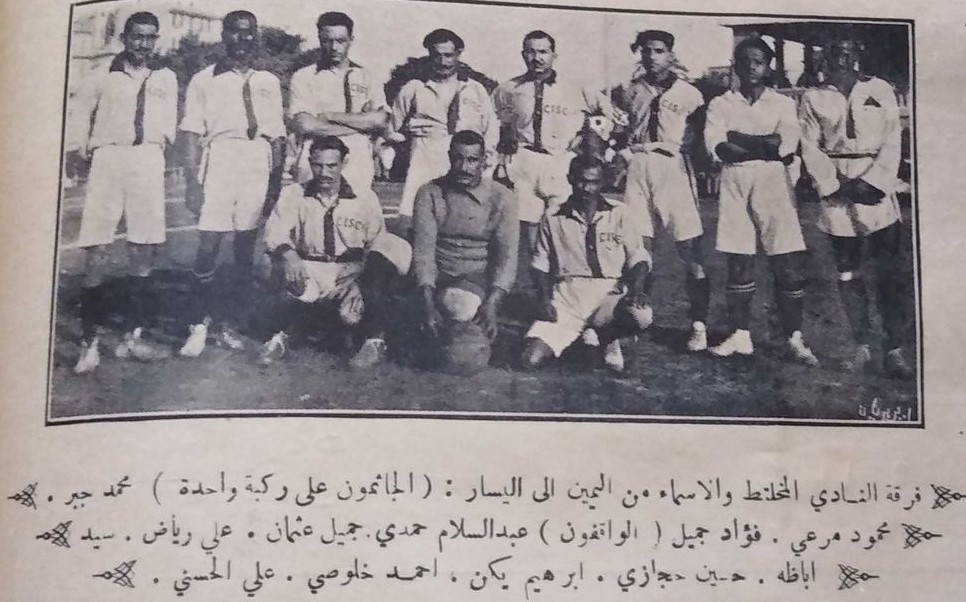
Gamil (first sitting from right) with Zamalek SC team in 1921.

Gamil was a part of Zamalek SC team that won the Sultan Hussein Cup in 1921, becoming the first Egyptian team to ever win a title. He represented Egypt in the men's tournament at the 1924 Summer Olympics in Paris.

== Honours ==
Zamalek

- Sultan Hussein Cup: 1921, 1922
- Egypt Cup: 1922, 1932
- Cairo League: 1922–23, 1928–29, 1929–30
- King's Cup: 1924–25
