= Frank Maher =

Frank Maher may refer to:

- Frank Maher (stuntman) (1929–2007), stuntman and coordinator for British TV shows
- Frank Maher (footballer) (1895–1976), Australian Rules footballer and coach
- Frank Maher (American football) (1918–1992), American football player
- Frank Maher (musician) (1934–2025), musician from Newfoundland known for his work on the buttonbox
