= Ahmad Maher =

Ahmad Maher may refer to:

- Ahmad Mahir Pasha (1888–1945), former Prime Minister of Egypt
- Ahmad Maher (diplomat) (1935–2010), grandson of Ahmad Mahir Pasha and former Foreign Minister of Egypt
- Ahmad Maher (director), Egyptian film director
- Ahmad Maher (footballer) (born 1990), Egyptian football player
- Ahmad Maher Wridat (born 1991), Palestinian football player
- Ahmed Maher (youth leader) (born 1980), co-founder of the April 6 Movement in Egypt
