= Mahir Ünlü =

Turkish author (1926–2017)

Mahir Ünlü (March 1926 – 1 June 2017) was a Turkish author.

== Life and career ==
Mahir was born in Harput in March 1926. He was a Turkish language and literature teacher at various military schools in Turkey from 1951 to 1971. After retiring, he continued teaching literature at Darüşşafaka Lycee and Saint Joseph Lycee in Istanbul from 1971 to 1980. Ünlü died on 1 June 2017, at the age of 91.

== Writings and books ==
- Cönk Gibi / Türkçede İnciler İncelikler
- Çağdaş Türk Edebiyatına Doğru – 19. Yüzyıl
- Dede Korkut Öyküleri
- Kavramlar ve Boyutları
- Lise Hazırlık Sınıfı Türkçe Dilbigisi
- Şinasi
- Türkçede Öykü-Roman
- Türkçede Yazınsal Eleştiri
- Yatılı Dolmakalem
- Yirminci yüzyıl Türk edebiyatı
- Toplumsallık Açısından Örneklerle Türk Edebiyatı (İslamlık Sürecinde) 1982
