= Maher, West Virginia =

Maher
- Unincorporated community
- Location within the state of West Virginia Maher (the United States)
- Coordinates: 37°46′9″N 82°19′39″W
- Country: United States
- State: West Virginia
- County: Mingo
- Elevation: 643 ft (196 m)
- Time zone: UTC-5 (Eastern (EST))
  - Summer (DST): UTC-4 (EDT)
- GNIS ID: 1555025

Maher is an unincorporated community in Mingo County, West Virginia, United States. Its post office is closed.
