= Ashour El Adham =

Egyptian footballer (born 1985)

Personal information
- Full name: Mohamed Ashour El Sayed El Adham
- Date of birth: 11 June 1985 (age 41)
- Place of birth: Port Said, Egypt
- Height: 1.72 m (5 ft 8 in)
- Position: Defensive midfielder

Team information
- Current team: Ceramica Cleopatra

Youth career
- Al Ahly
- Al Masry

Senior career*
Years	Team	Apps	(Gls)
2005–2010	Al Masry	84	(7)
2010–2011	Zamalek	22	(1)
2011–2013	El Gouna	30	(4)
2013–2015	Al Masry	49	(8)
2015–2018	Al Ittihad	78	(4)
2016–2017	→ Al Merrikh (loan)		
2019	Haras El Hodoud	11	(0)
2019–	Ceramica Cleopatra		
- * Club domestic league appearances and goals as of 29 March 2019

Ashour El Adham (Arabic: عاشور الأدهم; born 11 June 1985), is an Egyptian footballer who plays for Ceramica Cleopatra FC as a defensive midfielder. El Adham is known for his powerful shots and for his ability to score goals from long ranges.

== Career ==
In June 2010, El Adham penned a four-year contract to join Zamalek from Al Masry as part of a swap deal. Al Masry signed Ahmed Magdy and Ahmed El Merghany in exchange.
