= Sherif Fawzy =

Egyptian footballer (born 1990)

Personal information
- Full name: Sherif Fawzy Mohamed
- Date of birth: 2 June 1990 (age 36)
- Place of birth: Damietta, Egypt
- Height: 1.89 m (6 ft 2 1/2 in)
- Position: Goalkeeper

Team information
- Current team: El Zamalek

Youth career
- El Zamalek club

Senior career*
Years	Team	Apps	(Gls)
2004	Zamalek		
- * Club domestic league appearances and goals

Sherif Fawzy (Arabic: شريف فوزى; born 2 June 1990) is an Egyptian footballer who plays as a goalkeeper for Egyptian Premier League club Zamalek.
