= Maher El-Adawy =

Distinguished Egyptian career diplomat

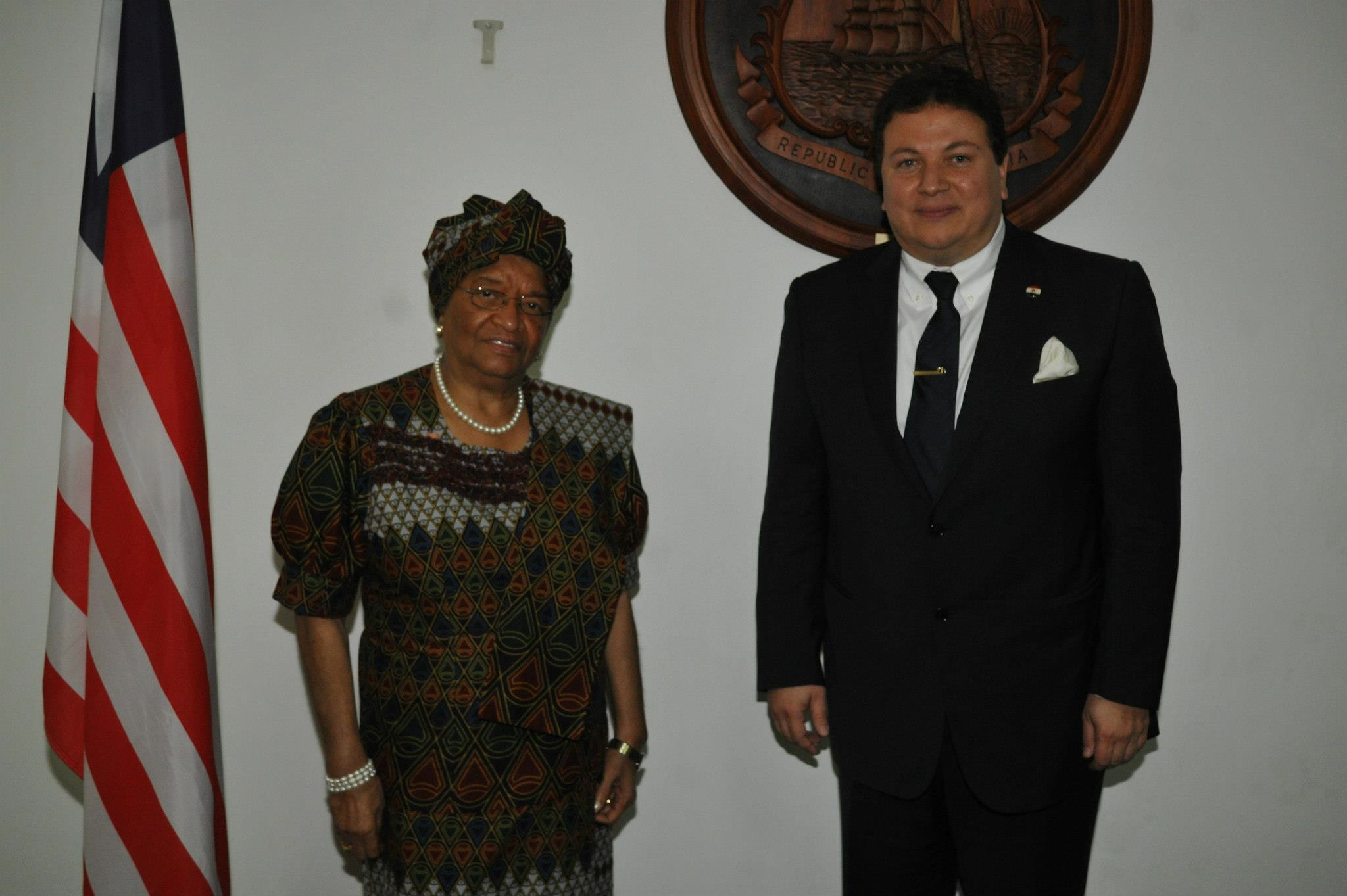
Ambassador El-Adawy with Liberian President Ellen Johnson Sirleaf.

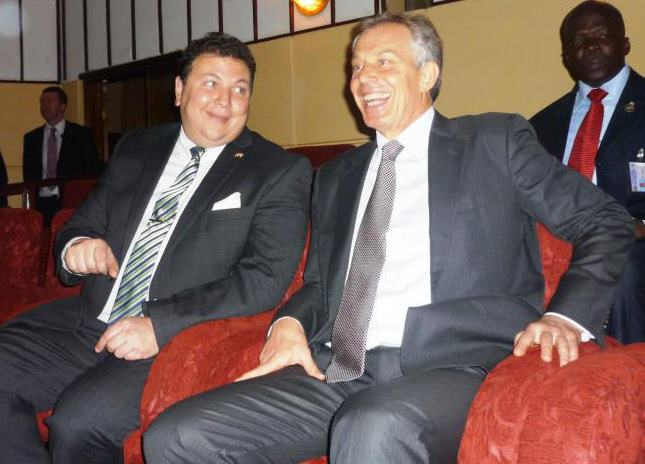
Ambassador El-Adawy with former Prime Minister Tony Blair.

Maher El-Adawy (Arabic: ماهر العدوي; born April 16, 1964) is a distinguished Egyptian career diplomat who joined the Egyptian Ministry of Foreign Affairs in 1985. He represents the third generation of the El-Adawy family at the Ministry of Foreign Affairs. He was the Deputy Assistant Foreign Minister of Egypt, until his appointment by President Abdel Fattah el-Sisi, as Ambassador Extraordinary and Plenipotentiary to the Republic of Malawi. His published op-ed in USA Today, titled "Downfall of the Muslim Brotherhood" drew much attention in Washington, and established him as a rising star in the Ministry of Foreign Affairs. He has worked in many Egyptian Missions around the world, with long-term diplomatic posts in Germany, Uruguay, Ghana, Sweden, Yemen and Ethiopia, and short-term assignments at the German Institute for International Development, the Egyptian Mission to the United Nations in New York and the National Defense University in Washington. After a short spell as the Ambassador in Liberia, he was praised by the Liberian President Ellen Johnson Sirleaf as having taken the bilateral relations between the two countries to a new level.

Early in his life, Maher El-Adawy lived and studied in Sudan, Australia and Switzerland, where he earned his high school diploma from the American International School of Zurich. He obtained a Bachelor of Arts degree in business administration with a minor in Computer Science from American University in Cairo in 1985. He received his Master of Arts degree in International Relations/Strategic Studies from Boston University in 1992. His father, Dr. Adel El-Adawy, was also an ambassador, serving in several Egyptian diplomatic missions around the world. He also was an adviser to the former president, Anwar Sadat, and the head of the Foreign Relations Committee of the Egyptian Parliament.
