= Hussein Yasser =

Qatari footballer (born 1984)

Personal information
- Full name: Hussein Yasser Mohamady Abdelrahman
- Date of birth: 9 October 1984 (age 42)
- Place of birth: Doha, Qatar
- Height: 1.67 m (5 ft 6 in)
- Positions: Midfielder; striker

Youth career
- 1992–1993: Al Ahly
- 1993–2000: Al-Khor

Senior career*
Years	Team	Apps	(Gls)
2000–2001	Al-Khor		(1)
2001–2002	Al Rayyan		(0)
2002–2004	Manchester United	0	(0)
2002–2004	→ Royal Antwerp (loan)	30	(1)
2004–2005	AEL Limassol	16	(4)
2005	Al Sadd	13	(1)
2005–2006	Manchester City	0	(0)
2006–2007	Al Rayyan	15	(2)
2007–2008	Braga	8	(0)
2008	→ Boavista (loan)	11	(0)
2008–2010	Al Ahly	20	(1)
2010–2011	Zamalek	42	(9)
2011–2013	Lierse	32	(0)
2013–2016	Al-Wakrah	28	(4)
2017–2018	Wadi Degla		

International career^{‡}
2001–2011	Qatar	69	(20)
- * Club domestic league appearances and goals as of 04:05, 11 July 2013 (UTC) ‡ National team caps and goals as of 14:29, 6 January 2012 (UTC)

Hussein Yasser Mohamady Abdelrahman (Arabic: حسين ياسر محمدي عبد الرحمن; born 9 October 1984) is a Qatari footballer who plays as a midfielder and winger for Egyptian side Wadi Degla.

== Personal life ==
Yasser was born in Doha, Qatar to an Egyptian family. His father was a footballer in Egypt during the 1970s. He transferred to Qatar in the 1980s to play with Al-Khor, before making the transition to coach in 1994. He is registered by FIFA as a Qatari footballer. His brothers are also footballers. His youngest brother, Ahmed Yasser, plays for the Qatar Under-20 team. Mohammed Yasser, his younger brother, is a former national player and currently plays for Umm Salal.

His wife, Angie, is a Belgian national. In 2005, she gave birth to their son Younis. He was set for an imminent return to the Egyptian Premier League in 2012, but his wife refused to return to Egypt due to the Egyptian Revolution of 2011, and he subsequently stayed in Belgium for an additional year.

== Club career ==
=== Manchester United and Royal Antwerp ===
Yasser's first professional club was Manchester United, for whom he signed in 2002. He was suggested to the club by René Meulensteen, who was then coach of the Qatar national team. He was soon farmed out to Royal Antwerp on loan in order to achieve a Belgian passport and qualify for a British work permit as an EU national. However, the agreement was terminated after two years, although he did manage to get a Belgian passport.

=== AEL Limassol ===
Manchester United sold Yasser to Cypriot club AEL Limassol in 2004. He left after just one season with the club, citing family problems.

=== Al-Sadd ===
After a short time with Cypriot First Division club AEL Limassol in 2004–05, Hussein returned to Qatar, playing for Al Sadd, winning the Qatar Stars League and the Heir Apparent Trophy.

=== Manchester City ===
In August 2005, Manchester City manager Stuart Pearce signed him on the recommendation of former City player Ali Benarbia, who played with Yasser in Qatar. However, Yasser made only one first team appearance, in a League Cup match against Doncaster Rovers. He was released in January 2006. Afterwards, he stated that leaving City was "the biggest mistake of his life".

=== Back to Qatar ===
In 2006–07, after departing Manchester City, he signed with his previous club, Al Rayyan, for one season.

=== Sporting Braga ===
During the summer of 2007, Hussein signed a deal with Portuguese club Sporting Braga. He had been convinced to join the side by his teammate João Tomás, who also made a similar transition from Al Rayyan to Braga in 2007. He became the first Qatari to play in the UEFA Cup. On 4 October 2007, he scored his first goal with his new team in UEFA Cup in a 4–0 win against Swedish side Hammarby.

=== Moving to Egypt ===
In May 2008, Hussein joined Al Ahly of Egypt on a three-year contract. He is legally considered an Egyptian player in Egypt, despite being registered by FIFA as a Qatari player, because he is also an Egyptian citizen. Thus, he was not considered part of Al Ahly's foreign player quota. Out of favour for most of the season, he mutually terminated his contract with Al Ahly on 27 January 2010 and paid $300,000 as a compensation. Hours later, he signed a contract for three-and-a-half years with local rivals Zamalek.

He showed very good form and was highly praised by Zamalek coach, Hossam Hassan. He scored his first goal against El-Entag El-Harby. He scored his second goal against his former club, Al Ahly, in the Cairo Derby which ended in a 3–3 draw. He also scored a goal in the first seconds of a match between Al Ahly and Zamalek in the Egyptian Cup that ended 3–1. He would duplicate his achievement one year later by once again scoring in the derby against his former club, thus breaking a new record by scoring three goals in three matches played against Al Ahly. After a long legal battle with Zamalek, which involved the club dragging Hussein to FIFA, due to the fact that he signed with Belgian club Lierse S.K. when his contract was valid until 2014, he finally escaped Zamalek in the summer. The main cause of his departure from Zamalek was delayed payments.

=== Lierse ===
Yasser signed a two-year contract for Lierse on 11 August 2011. He made his league debut on 22 October in a match against Sint-Truiden after coming on as a substitute for Gonzague Vandooren. During his tenure with Lierse, he was Qatar's highest paid athlete, earning $500,000 annually. Lierse decided not to renew his contract and he was released in the summer of 2013.

=== Return to Q-League ===
After his contract with Lierse expired, he signed a one-year contract with Al-Wakrah of Qatar Stars League on 10 July 2013.

=== Return to Egypt ===
In July 2017, it was announced that Yasser signed with Egyptian club Wadi Degla. He had not played for a club since July 2016 when he parted ways with Al Wakrah.

== International career ==
Yasser played for Qatar's youth teams from the age of 11. He played in the 2007 Gulf Cup, held in the United Arab Emirates in late January. Qatar team did not win, but Yasser impressed many. There was a request for him to enter one of the Emirati clubs, but he said that he still had a contract with Al Rayyan and was not thinking far into the future.

He was called up to the Qatar squad for the 2011 AFC Asian Cup, held on home soil. He featured in the hosts' first game against Uzbekistan, but was substituted later on as his team lost 2–0. He was an unused substitute for Qatar's other two group games against China and Kuwait in which they emerged victorious. He was later kicked out of the Qatar squad because he missed training and displayed a poor attitude. He has not been called up to the Qatar squad since being excluded apart from one game that September.

== Honours ==
- Qatar Crown Prince Cup: 2000–01
- Egyptian Premier League: 2008–09, 2009–10
- CAF Super Cup: 2009
