= Jimmy Maher (footballer) =

Australian rules footballer

Personal information
- Full name: James John Maher
- Born: 11 April 1913; Warragul, Victoria
- Died: 14 April 1977 (aged 64); Sydney, New South Wales
- Original team: Trafalgar
- Height: 171 cm (5 ft 7 in)
- Weight: 70 kg (154 lb)

Playing career^{1}
Years	Club	Games (Goals)
1937	South Melbourne	4 (3)
- ^{1} Playing statistics correct to the end of 1937.

James John Maher (11 April 1913 – 14 April 1977) was an Australian rules footballer who played with South Melbourne in the Victorian Football League (VFL).
