= Mohamed Younis =

Egyptian footballer (born 1979)

Personal information
- Full name: Mohamed Younis
- Date of birth: October 30, 1979 (age 47)
- Place of birth: Ismailia, Egypt
- Height: 1.80 m (5 ft 11 in)
- Position: Defender

Team information
- Current team: Al-Ittihad Al-Sakndary

Youth career
- Ismaily

Senior career*
Years	Team	Apps	(Gls)
1998–2004	Ismaily		
2004–2007	ENPPI Club		
2007–2010	El-Masria Lalettesalat		
2010–2011	Zamalek		
2011–2013	Petrojet		
2013–present	Al-Ittihad Al-Sakndary		
- * Club domestic league appearances and goals

Mohamed Younis (Arabic: محمد يونس; 30 October 1979) is an Egyptian footballer. He currently plays as a defender for the Egyptian Premier League club Al-Ittihad Al-Sakndary.

After spending 5 years in ENPPI and becoming the team's captain, Younis left the club in 2007 and went to El-Masria Lalettesalat.

Mohamed joined Zamalek from El-Masria Lalettesalat in July 2010 as a free agent.

After failing to make an impression with Zamalek, Younis was sold to Petrojet during the 2011 Summer transfers.
