= Ayman Kamel =

Egyptian diplomat and ambassador (born 1965)

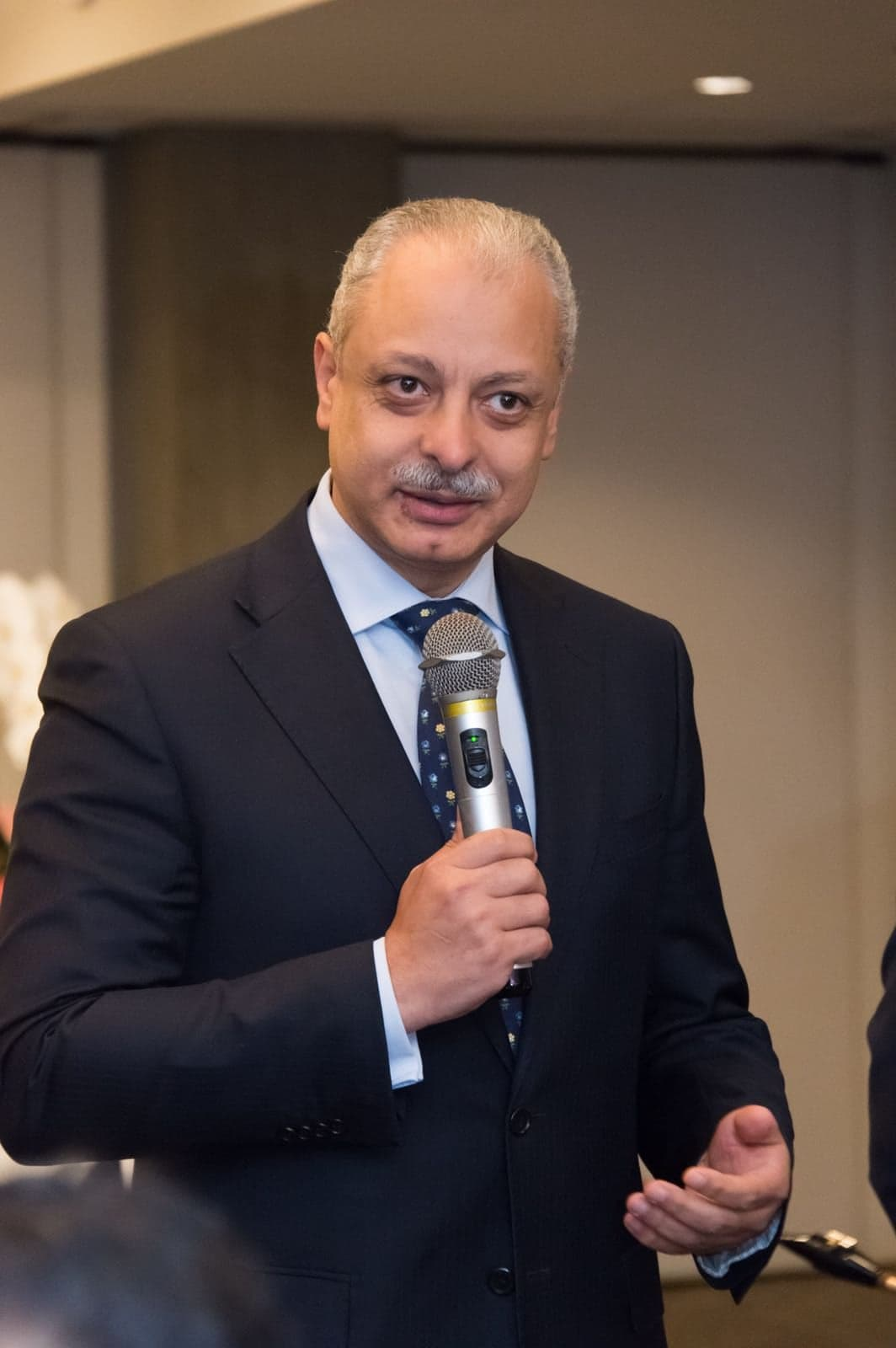

Ambassador of Egypt to Slovakia
- In office October 2023 – October 2025
- President: Abdel Fattah el-Sisi
- Minister of Foreign Affairs: Sameh Shoukry

Assistant Minister for Asia, Australia, New Zealand, & the Pacific Islands
- In office November 2021 – October 2023
- President: Abdel Fattah el-Sisi
- Minister of Foreign Affairs: Sameh Shoukry

Ambassador of Egypt to Japan
- In office October 2017 – October 2021
- President: Abdel Fattah el-Sisi
- Minister of Foreign Affairs: Sameh Shoukry
- Preceded by: Ismail Khairat
- Succeeded by: Mohamed Abubakr Saleh Fattah

First Undersecretary of Foreign Affairs
- In office 2014–2017
- President: Abdel Fattah el-Sisi
- Minister of Foreign Affairs: Sameh Shoukry

Personal details
- Born: 4 September 1965 (age 61) Cairo, Egypt
- Spouse: Ghada Youssef
- Children: 2
- Education: Ain Shams University

Ayman Aly Kamel (born September 4, 1965) is an Egyptian diplomat, and the former Ambassador of Egypt to Slovakia. He was previously the Assistant Foreign Minister for Asia, Australia, New Zealand, and the Pacific Islands, and served as Ambassador of Egypt to Japan from October 2017 to October 2021. He has also served as the First Undersecretary of Foreign Affairs in Egypt, and Consul-General in Sydney.

Ambassador Kamel has over 38 years of experience as a career diplomat and public service official in various Egyptian missions abroad. Previously, he served as Head of the Consular mission in Jordan, where he had been looking after the interests of a community of more than 300 000 Egyptians. Prior to this assignment he was Consul and Deputy Chief of mission in several countries including Italy, Mexico, and the Sultanate of Oman.

In November 2024, he was awarded the Order of the Rising Sun, Gold and Silver star, by Emperor Naruhito of Japan, for his role in elevating Egypt-Japan relations to the level of strategic partnership.

== Early life and education ==
Ayman Kamel was born in Cairo. He was educated in French-language schools, and received a degree of Bachelor of Arts in French Language and Literature in 1986. He holds a Diploma in International Relations from Geneva in 1994, as well as several specialized studies certificates in Diplomacy and Negotiations from Georgetown University in the United States, the German Foundation for International Development in Berlin, and the Egyptian Institute for Diplomatic Studies.

== Career ==
Mr. Kamel held different positions in the Ministry of Foreign Affairs; he was appointed Deputy Assistant Foreign Minister from 2008 to 2010, and was responsible for several committees aiming at optimizing administrative performance.

He participated in various international Conferences and Conventions dealing with numerous vital issues such as Interfaith Dialogue, Regional development, and multilateral cooperation and he was one of the Egyptian officers responsible for convening several rounds of the Middle East Peace Talks. He masters several languages including Arabic, French, English, Italian and Spanish.

Ambassador Kamel performed numerous volunteer tasks for Humanitarian causes with Charity Organizations such as the International Red Cross, the Egyptian Red Crescent, Caritas, Rotary and Lions.

After serving as ambassador in Tokyo for four years, in October 2021, he was received by Emperor Naruhito for the farewell meeting at the Tokyo Imperial Palace, and there he appreciated the sovereign's support and attention during his tenure. He also remarked to the emperor that Egypt and Japan collaborated for the recent years on various matters such as education, archaeology, sports, healthcare and prevention of COVID-19 spreading.
