= Mohamed Refaie =

Egyptian footballer (born 1990)

Personal information
- Full name: Mohamed Refaie Weya
- Date of birth: 21 February 1990 (age 36)
- Place of birth: Egypt
- Height: 1.77 m (5 ft 10 in)
- Position: Left-back

Youth career
- Zamalek

Senior career*
Years	Team	Apps	(Gls)
2009–2011	Zamalek	1	(0)
2011–2012	Wadi Degla	4	(0)
2012–2013	Tala'ea El-Gaish		
2013	Dnepr Mogilev	7	(0)
2014	Naftan Novopolotsk	8	(0)
2014–2015	Al Nasr Cairo	32	(2)
2015–2017	Al-Masry	15	(0)
2017	Al Merreikh		
2018	Al Nasr Cairo	7	(0)
- * Club domestic league appearances and goals as of 31 May 2018

Mohamed Refaie (Arabic: محمد رفاعى; born 21 February 1990) is an Egyptian former football defender.
