= Amr Fahim =

Egyptian footballer (born 1976)

Personal information
- Date of birth: October 4, 1976 (age 50)
- Place of birth: Cairo, Egypt
- Height: 1.82 m (5 ft 11 1/2 in)
- Position: Defender

Senior career*
Years	Team	Apps	(Gls)
1996–1998	Aswan SC		
1998–2001	Zamalek		
2001–2005	Ismaily	34	(1)
2005–2013	ENPPI		
2013–2014	El-Entag El-Harby		

International career
1998–2004	Egypt	10	(0)
- * Club domestic league appearances and goals

Amr Fahim (Arabic: عمرو فهيم; born October 4, 1976) is a retired Egyptian defender who played for the Egyptian Premier League side El-Entag El-Harby.
