= Wajih Abdel-Azim =

Egyptian footballer (born 1979)

Wagih Abdel-Azim
Personal information
- Full name: Wagih Abdel-Azim
- Date of birth: 3 September 1979 (age 47)
- Place of birth: Qalyubia, Egypt
- Height: 1.58 m (5 ft 2 in)
- Position: Defensive midfielder

Team information
- Current team: El-Entag El-Harby

Senior career*
Years	Team	Apps	(Gls)
–2010	El-Masry		
2010–2011	Zamalek		
2011–	El-Entag El-Harby		
- * Club domestic league appearances and goals

Wagih Abdel Azim (Arabic: وجيه عبد العظيم) is an Egyptian footballer who plays for Egyptian Premier League club Zamalek.

== Career ==
In June 2010, Wagih penned a two-year contract to join Zamalek from El-Masry as a free agent.
