= Alaa Ali =

Egyptian footballer (1988–2019)

Personal information
- Full name: Alaa El-din Ali Abdel-Rahim
- Date of birth: 28 January 1988
- Place of birth: Egypt
- Date of death: 11 November 2019 (aged 31)
- Height: 1.81 m (5 ft 11 in)
- Position: Attacking midfielder

Youth career
- –2009: Zamalek

Senior career*
Years	Team	Apps	(Gls)
2009–2013	Zamalek		(3)
2013	→ Telephonat Beni Suef (loan)	13	(1)
2013–2015	Smouha		(8)
2015–2016	Tala'ea El Gaish		(5)
2016–2017	Wadi Degla		
2017–2018	Al Masry		(1)
2018–2019	Petrojet		(2)
- * Club domestic league appearances and goals

Alaa Ali (Arabic: علاء علي; 28 January 1988 – 11 November 2019) was an Egyptian footballer who played as an attacking midfielder.

== Career ==
Coming through Zamalek's youth academy and establishing himself as one of their best players, Ali went out on loan to Telephonat Beni Suef in 2013. Ali signed for Smouha in 2013. Later on, he played for short periods for Tala'ea El Gaish, Wadi Degla, Al Masry and Petrojet.

== Death ==
Ali died on 11 November 2019, aged 31, due to cancer.
