= Hussein Hamdy =

Egyptian footballer (born 1985)

Personal information
- Full name: Hussein Hamdy
- Date of birth: 25 July 1985 (age 41)
- Place of birth: Kafr Saqr, Sharqia Governorate, Egypt
- Height: 1.92 m (6 ft 3 1/2 in)
- Position: Center forward

Team information
- Current team: FC Masr

Senior career*
Years	Team	Apps	(Gls)
2010–2011	Misr Lel-Makkasa	30	(8)
2011–2012	Zamalek	4	(2)
2012–2015	Misr Lel-Makkasa		
2012	Telefonat (loan)		
2014–2015	Haras El Hedood (loan)		
2015–	FC Masr		

International career^{‡}
	Egyptian Military Team	1	(5)
- * Club domestic league appearances and goals ‡ National team caps and goals as of August 2011

Hussein Hamdy (Arabic: حسين حمدي). He currently plays as a center forward for FC Masr.

== Career ==
He started his career in Egyptian Premier league in the season (2010–2011) with Misr El Makasa He moved to Zamalek in the summer transfer of the season (2011–2012), and returned to Misr El Makasa in the winter transfer of that season.
