= Ahmad Maher (footballer) =

Egyptian footballer (born 1989)

Personal information
- Full name: Ahmad Maher
- Date of birth: January 6, 1989 (age 37)
- Place of birth: Egypt
- Height: 1.80 m (5 ft 11 in)
- Position: Right back

Team information
- Current team: Al-Ittihad Al-Sakndary

Youth career
- Zamalek

Senior career*
Years	Team	Apps	(Gls)
- Zamalek
2011–2012	Misr El Makasa	4	(0)
2012–	Al-Ittihad Al-Sakndary		

International career
2010–	Egypt U-23	2	(0)
- * Club domestic league appearances and goals

Ahmad Maher (Arabic: أحمد ماهر) (born 6 January 1989) is an Egyptian footballer who plays as a right side back for West Bank Premier League side Shabab Al-Dhahiriya SC.
