= Mohamed Nasef =

Egyptian footballer (born 1988)

Personal information
- Full name: Mohamed Nasef Bassem Youssef
- Date of birth: 1 November 1988 (age 37)
- Place of birth: Quesna, El Monufia, Egypt
- Height: 1.82 m (6 ft 0 in)
- Position: Left back

Team information
- Current team: Tala'ea El Gaish
- Number: 21

Youth career
- Al Ahly

Senior career*
Years	Team	Apps	(Gls)
2009–2016	ENPPI	122	(3)
2016–2017	Zamalek	20	(0)
2017–	Tala'ea El Gaish	3	(0)
2018–2019	→ Al Ittihad (loan)	14	(0)

International career
2011–2016	Egypt	6	(0)
- * Club domestic league appearances and goals as of 12:54, 17 December 2019 (UTC)

Mohamed Nasef (Arabic: محمد ناصف; born 1 November 1988), is an Egyptian footballer who plays for Egyptian Premier League side Tala'ea El Gaish, as a defender.

== Honours ==
=== Club ===
Zamalek

- Egypt Cup: 2015–16
- Egyptian Super Cup: 2016
