= Ahmed El Merghany =

Egyptian footballer (born 1988)

Personal information
- Full name: Ahmed El Merghany Mohamed Ahmed
- Date of birth: 24 May 1988 (age 38)
- Place of birth: Maadi, Cairo, Egypt
- Height: 1.78 m (5 ft 10 in)
- Position: Midfielder

Senior career*
Years	Team	Apps	(Gls)
2008–2013	Zamalek SC	47	(7)
2010–2011	→ Al-Masry (loan)	21	(4)
2012–2013	→ Telephonat Bani Sweif (loan)	8	(0)
2013	→ Al Tadamun (loan)	11	(2)
2013–2014	Sur SC	14	(2)
2014–2015	Wadi Degla	18	(4)
2015–2017	Goldi		
2017	Mansheyat Bani Hasan		
2017–2018	Goldi		
2018	Dikernis		

International career
2009–2010	Egypt	6	(0)
- * Club domestic league appearances and goals

Ahmed El Merghany (born 24 May 1988, in Cairo;Arabic: أحمد المرغني) is a former Egyptian footballer. He last played as a defensive midfielder for Dikernis.

In 2016, Merghany was suspended after describing the President of Egypt, Abdel Fattah el-Sisi, as a “failure” on Facebook.
