= 2013 CAF Champions League qualifying rounds =

- Dates: 15 February – 5 May 2013

The qualifying rounds of the 2013 CAF Champions League were played from 15 February to 5 May 2013, to decide the eight teams which advanced to the group stage.

== Draw ==
The draw for the preliminary, first and second qualifying rounds was held on 9 December 2012, at the CAF Headquarters in Cairo, Egypt, and the fixtures were announced by the CAF on 10 December 2012.

The following 56 teams were entered into the draw:

Byes to first round

- (Algeria) ES Sétif
- (Democratic Republic of the Congo) TP Mazembe
- (Egypt) Al-Ahly
- (Mali) Djoliba
- (Mali) Stade Malien
- (Sudan) Al-Hilal
- (Sudan) Al-Merrikh
- (Tunisia) Espérance de Tunis

Entrants to preliminary round

- (Algeria) JSM Béjaïa
- (Angola) Primeiro de Agosto
- (Angola) Recreativo do Libolo
- (Benin) ASPAC
- (Botswana) Mochudi Centre Chiefs
- (Burkina Faso) ASFA Yennenga
- (Burundi) Vital'O
- (Cameroon) Coton Sport
- (Cameroon) Union Douala
- (Central African Republic) Olympic Real de Bangui
- (Chad) Gazelle
- (Comoros) Djabal Club
- (Republic of the Congo) AC Léopards
- (Democratic Republic of the Congo) AS Vita Club
- (Ivory Coast) AFAD Djékanou
- (Ivory Coast) Séwé Sport
- (Egypt) Zamalek
- (Equatorial Guinea) Sony Elá Nguema
- (Ethiopia) Saint George
- (Gabon) CF Mounana
- (The Gambia) Real de Banjul
- (Ghana) Asante Kotoko
- (Guinea) Horoya
- (Kenya) Tusker
- Lesotho Correctional Services
- (Liberia) LISCR
- (Libya) Al-Ittihad
- (Madagascar) AS Adema
- (Morocco) FUS Rabat
- (Morocco) Moghreb Tétouan
- (Mozambique) Maxaquene
- (Niger) Olympic Niamey
- (Nigeria) Enugu Rangers
- (Nigeria) Kano Pillars
- (Rwanda) APR
- (São Tomé and Príncipe) Sporting Clube do Príncipe
- (Senegal) Casa Sports
- (Seychelles) St Michel United
- (Sierra Leone) Diamond Stars
- (South Africa) Orlando Pirates
- (Eswatini) Mbabane Swallows
- (Tanzania) Simba
- (Togo) Dynamic Togolais
- (Tunisia) CA Bizertin
- (Uganda) URA
- (Zambia) Zanaco
- (Zanzibar) Jamhuri
- (Zimbabwe) Dynamos

== Format ==
Qualification ties were played on a home-and-away two-legged basis. If the sides were level on aggregate after the second leg, the away goals rule was applied, and if still level, the tie proceeded directly to a penalty shoot-out (no extra time was played).

== Schedule ==
The schedule of each round was as follows.

Round	First leg	Second leg
Preliminary round	15–17 February 2013	1–3 March 2013
First round	15–17 March 2013	5–7 April 2013
Second round	19–21 April 2013	3–5 May 2013

== Preliminary round ==
The preliminary round included the 48 teams that did not receive byes to the first round.

Team 1	Agg.	Team 2	1st leg	2nd leg
Zamalek (Egypt)	7–0	(Chad) Gazelle	7–0	0–0
AS Vita Club (Democratic Republic of the Congo)	5–1	(Togo) Dynamic Togolais	3–0	2–1
Jamhuri (Zanzibar)	0–8	(Ethiopia) Saint George	0–3	0–5
CA Bizertin (Tunisia)	2–1	(Libya) Al-Ittihad	1–1	1–0
Dynamos (Zimbabwe)	3–1	Lesotho Correctional Services	3–0	0–1
St Michel United (Seychelles)	1–7	(Kenya) Tusker	1–4	0–3
Zanaco (Zambia)	3–2	(Eswatini) Mbabane Swallows	3–2	0–0
Orlando Pirates (South Africa)	9–0	(Comoros) Djabal Club	5–0	4–0
Maxaquene (Mozambique)	0–2	(Botswana) Mochudi Centre Chiefs	0–1	0–1
APR (Rwanda)	2–2 (a)	(Burundi) Vital'O	1–2	1–0
Enugu Rangers (Nigeria)	w/o	(São Tomé and Príncipe) Sporting Clube do Príncipe	—	—
Simba (Tanzania)	0–5	(Angola) Recreativo do Libolo	0–1	0–4
JSM Béjaïa (Algeria)	3–0	(Niger) Olympic Niamey	3–0	0–0
Asante Kotoko (Ghana)	8–0	(Equatorial Guinea) Sony Elá Nguema	7–0	1–0
Primeiro de Agosto (Angola)	4–3	(Madagascar) AS Adema	4–2	0–1
FUS Rabat (Morocco)	2–2 (a)	(The Gambia) Real de Banjul	1–0	1–2
Union Douala (Cameroon)	3–1	(Liberia) LISCR	2–1	1–0
Horoya (Guinea)	0–3	(Ivory Coast) Séwé Sport	0–0	0–3
AFAD Djékanou (Ivory Coast)	6–2	(Sierra Leone) Diamond Stars	5–1	1–1
Coton Sport (Cameroon)	0–0 (4–3 p)	(Uganda) URA	0–0	0–0
Moghreb Tétouan (Morocco)	1–1 (1–3 p)	(Senegal) Casa Sports	1–0	0–1
Kano Pillars (Nigeria)	5–1	(Central African Republic) Olympic Real de Bangui	5–1	0–0
AC Léopards (Republic of the Congo)	2–1	(Gabon) CF Mounana	2–0	0–1
ASPAC (Benin)	2–2 (4–5 p)	(Burkina Faso) ASFA Yennenga	1–1	1–1

17 February 2013
18:00 UTC+2

Zamalek (Egypt)	7–0	(Chad) Gazelle
Gaafar 15', 45+3'; Ibrahim 28', 83'; Cissé 76', 88'; Hassan 81'	Report

Borg El Arab Stadium, Alexandria
Referee: Mohamed Said Kordi (Tunisia)
2 March 2013
15:30 UTC+1

Gazelle (Chad)	0–0	(Egypt) Zamalek
	Report

Stade Omnisports Idriss Mahamat Ouya, N'Djamena
Referee: Roponat Mbourou (Gabon)

Zamalek won 7–0 on aggregate and advanced to the first round.

17 February 2013
15:30 UTC+1

AS Vita Club (Democratic Republic of the Congo)	3–0	(Togo) Dynamic Togolais
Etekiama 6', 21' (pen.); Luvumbu 74'	Report

Stade des Martyrs, Kinshasa
Referee: Henry Mouandjo (Cameroon)
3 March 2013
15:00 UTC±0

Dynamic Togolais (Togo)	1–2	(Democratic Republic of the Congo) AS Vita Club
Towodjo 56'	Report	Mpeko 63'; Etekiama 79'

Stade de Kégué, Lomé
Referee: Abdoul-Aziz Hama (Niger)

AS Vita Club won 5–1 on aggregate and advanced to the first round.

16 February 2013
16:00 UTC+3

Jamhuri (Zanzibar)	0–3	(Ethiopia) Saint George
	Report	Oukri 5'; Gebremariam 54'; Abomi 79'

Gombani Stadium, Chake-Chake
Referee: Abdul Twagirumukiza (Rwanda)
3 March 2013
16:00 UTC+3

Saint George (Ethiopia)	5–0	(Zanzibar) Jamhuri
Alula Girma 38'; Abomi 47'; Butako 54'; Bekele 79'; Adane Girma 86'	Report

Addis Ababa Stadium, Addis Ababa
Referee: Mahmoud Ashour (Egypt)

Saint George won 8–0 on aggregate and advanced to the first round.

15 February 2013
16:00 UTC+1

CA Bizertin (Tunisia)	1–1	(Libya) Al-Ittihad
Harran 49'	Report	Al Shibani 61'

Stade Olympique de Radès, Radès
Referee: Rédouane Jiyed (Morocco)
3 March 2013
16:00 UTC±0

Al-Ittihad (Libya)	0–1	(Tunisia) CA Bizertin
	Report	Troudi 24'

Stade Moulay Abdellah, Rabat (Morocco)
Referee: Mokhtar Amalou (Algeria)

Note: Al-Ittihad played their home match in Morocco due to security concerns in Libya.
CA Bizertin won 2–1 on aggregate and advanced to the first round.

17 February 2013
15:00 UTC+2

Dynamos (Zimbabwe)	3–0	Lesotho Correctional Services
Muparati 22'; Ziruntusa 61'; Jaure 73'	Report

Rufaro Stadium, Harare
Referee: Andreas Helmut (Namibia)
3 March 2013
15:00 UTC+2

Lesotho Correctional Services	1–0	(Zimbabwe) Dynamos
Rankara 79'	Report

Setsoto Stadium, Maseru
Referee: Kaoma Wellington (Zambia)

Dynamos won 3–1 on aggregate and advanced to the first round.

16 February 2013
16:30 UTC+4

St Michel United (Seychelles)	1–4	(Kenya) Tusker
Tsaralaza 27'	Report	Ochieng 30', 85'; Olunga 72'; Sekayombya 83'

Stade Linité, Victoria
Referee: Ali Adelaïd (Comoros)
2 March 2013
16:00 UTC+3

Tusker (Kenya)	3–0	(Seychelles) St Michel United
Opiyo 65'; Sekayombya 70'; Shikokoti 79'	Report

Moi International Sports Centre, Kasarani
Referee: Eric Gasinzigwa (Burundi)

Tusker won 7–1 on aggregate and advanced to the first round.

16 February 2013
15:00 UTC+2

Zanaco (Zambia)	3–2	(Eswatini) Mbabane Swallows
Kabuki 4'; Kabwe 33'; Banda 54'	Report	Ndzinisa 48'; Tsabedze 72'

Nkoloma Stadium, Lusaka
Referee: Anthony Raphael (Malawi)
3 March 2013
15:00 UTC+2

Mbabane Swallows (Eswatini)	0–0	(Zambia) Zanaco
	Report

Somhlolo National Stadium, Lobamba
Referee: Lekgotla Johannes (Botswana)

Zanaco won 3–2 on aggregate and advanced to the first round.

16 February 2013
20:15 UTC+2

Orlando Pirates (South Africa)	5–0	(Comoros) Djabal Club
Myeni 26'; Chinyama 33', 52', 66', 71'	Report

Orlando Stadium, Soweto
Referee: Abdoul Kanoso (Madagascar)
2 March 2013
16:00 UTC+3

Djabal Club (Comoros)	0–4	(South Africa) Orlando Pirates
	Report	Mbuyane 6'; Mabena 8'; Chinyama 54'; Okonkwo 90'

Stade Saïd Mohamed Cheikh, Mitsamiouli
Referee: Ganesh Chutooree (Mauritius)

Orlando Pirates won 9–0 on aggregate and advanced to the first round.

17 February 2013
16:00 UTC+2

Maxaquene (Mozambique)	0–1	(Botswana) Mochudi Centre Chiefs
	Report	Ramatlhakwane 90+4'

Estádio do Zimpeto, Maputo
Referee: Nelson Fred (Seychelles)
2 March 2013
16:00 UTC+2

Mochudi Centre Chiefs (Botswana)	1–0	(Mozambique) Maxaquene
Motlhabankwe 81'	Report

Molepolole Stadium, Molepolole
Referee: Osiase Koto (Lesotho)

Mochudi Centre Chiefs won 2–0 on aggregate and advanced to the first round.

16 February 2013
15:30 UTC+2

APR (Rwanda)	1–2	(Burundi) Vital'O
Sekamana 67'	Report	Nkurikiye 27'; Tambwe 64'

Stade Amahoro, Kigali
Referee: Dennis Batte (Uganda)
3 March 2013
15:30 UTC+2

Vital'O (Burundi)	0–1	(Rwanda) APR
	Report	Mubumbyi 75'

Prince Louis Rwagasore Stadium, Bujumbura
Referee: El Fadil Mohamed (Sudan)

2–2 on aggregate. Vital'O won on the away goals rule and advanced to the first round.

17 February 2013
14:00 UTC+1

Enugu Rangers (Nigeria)	Cancelled	(São Tomé and Príncipe) Sporting Clube do Príncipe
	Report

Nnamdi Azikiwe Stadium, Enugu
Referee: Kokou Djaoupe (Togo)
1–3 March 2013

Sporting Clube do Príncipe (São Tomé and Príncipe)	Cancelled	(Nigeria) Enugu Rangers
	Report

Referee: Idriss Biani (Chad)

Enugu Rangers advanced to the first round after Sporting Clube do Príncipe failed to show up for the first leg.

17 February 2013
16:30 UTC+3

Simba (Tanzania)	0–1	(Angola) Recreativo do Libolo
	Report	Martins 24'

Benjamin Mkapa National Stadium, Dar es Salaam
Referee: Daniel Volgraaf (South Africa)
3 March 2013
15:00 UTC+1

Recreativo do Libolo (Angola)	4–0	(Tanzania) Simba
Vado 9', 87'; Rasca 79'; Rúben Gouveia 81'	Report

Estádio Municipal de Calulo, Calulo
Referee: Simanga Nhleko (Swaziland)

Recreativo do Libolo won 5–0 on aggregate and advanced to the first round.

15 February 2013
17:00 UTC+1

JSM Béjaïa (Algeria)	3–0	(Niger) Olympic Niamey
Megateli 8'; Mebarki 48'; Derrag 78'	Report

Stade de l'Unité Maghrébine, Béjaïa
Referee: Yakhouba Keita (Guinea)
1 March 2013
15:00 UTC+1

Olympic Niamey (Niger)	0–0	(Algeria) JSM Béjaïa
	Report

Stade Général Seyni Kountché, Niamey
Referee: Maguette N'Diaye (Senegal)

JSM Béjaïa won 3–0 on aggregate and advanced to the first round.

17 February 2013
15:00 UTC±0

Asante Kotoko (Ghana)	7–0	(Equatorial Guinea) Sony Elá Nguema
Boakye 11'; Aziz 28'; Anaba 36'; Helebege 41'; Mpong 68'; Bancey 79'; Ochaya 86'	Report

Baba Yara Stadium, Kumasi
Referee: Denis Dembélé (Ivory Coast)
3 March 2013
18:00 UTC+1

Sony Elá Nguema (Equatorial Guinea)	0–1	(Ghana) Asante Kotoko
	Report	Aziz 64'

Estadio de Malabo, Malabo
Referee: Antonio Muachihuissa Caxala (Angola)

Asante Kotoko won 8–0 on aggregate and advanced to the first round.

16 February 2013
17:00 UTC+1

Primeiro de Agosto (Angola)	4–2	(Madagascar) AS Adema
Alfred 7'; David 32'; Mingo Bile 33'; Musasa 80'	Report	Njilamana 66'; Niasexe 79'

Estádio 11 de Novembro, Luanda
Referee: Norman Matemera (Zimbabwe)
3 March 2013
14:30 UTC+3

AS Adema (Madagascar)	1–0	(Angola) Primeiro de Agosto
Randriamanjaka 87'	Report

Mahamasina Municipal Stadium, Antananarivo
Referee: Samuel Chirindza (Mozambique)

Primeiro de Agosto won 4–3 on aggregate and advanced to the first round.

15 February 2013
19:00 UTC±0

FUS Rabat (Morocco)	1–0	(The Gambia) Real de Banjul
Batna 90+4' (pen.)	Report

Prince Moulay Abdellah Stadium, Rabat
Referee: William Agbovi (Ghana)
2 March 2013
15:00 UTC±0

Real de Banjul (The Gambia)	2–1	(Morocco) FUS Rabat
Savage 60', 81'	Report	Ndame Ndame 65'

Independence Stadium, Bakau
Referee: Mohamed Hamada (Mauritania)

2–2 on aggregate. FUS Rabat won on the away goals rule and advanced to the first round.

17 February 2013
16:00 UTC+1

Union Douala (Cameroon)	2–1	(Liberia) LISCR
Manga 60'; Kongnyuy 72'	Report	Jarteh 52'

Stade de la Réunification, Douala
Referee: Tsiba Kamba (Congo)
3 March 2013
15:00 UTC±0

LISCR (Liberia)	0–1	(Cameroon) Union Douala
	Report	Nga 86'

Antoinette Tubman Stadium, Monrovia
Referee: Ousmane Fall (Senegal)

Union Douala won 3–1 on aggregate and advanced to the first round.

17 February 2013
16:30 UTC±0

Horoya (Guinea)	0–0	(Ivory Coast) Séwé Sport
	Report

Stade du 28 Septembre, Conakry
Referee: Bakary Camara (Gambia)
2 March 2013
15:30 UTC±0

Séwé Sport (Ivory Coast)	3–0	(Guinea) Horoya
Pacôme 23'; Halidou 58'; Kakou 78'	Report

Stade Robert Champroux, Abidjan
Referee: Abdul Karim Kabia (Sierra Leone)

Séwé Sport won 3–0 on aggregate and advanced to the first round.

17 February 2013
15:30 UTC±0

AFAD Djékanou (Ivory Coast)	5–1	(Sierra Leone) Diamond Stars
Soro Nanga 24', 45', 45', 84', 88'	Report	Badar 83'

Stade Robert Champroux, Abidjan
Referee: Henry Ogunyamodi (Nigeria)
2 March 2013
16:30 UTC±0

Diamond Stars (Sierra Leone)	1–1	(Ivory Coast) AFAD Djékanou
Sesay 6'	Report	Zahui 54' (pen.)

National Stadium, Freetown
Referee: Jerry Yekeh (Liberia)

AFAD Djékanou won 6–2 on aggregate and advanced to the first round.

17 February 2013
15:30 UTC+1

Coton Sport (Cameroon)	0–0	(Uganda) URA
	Report

Roumdé Adjia Stadium, Garoua
Referee: Achile Madila (Congo DR)
2 March 2013
16:00 UTC+3

URA (Uganda)	0–0	(Cameroon) Coton Sport
	Report
Penalties
	3–4

National Stadium, Kampala
Referee: Charles Mbaga (Tanzania)

0–0 on aggregate. Coton Sport won the penalty shoot-out and advanced to the first round.

16 February 2013
18:00 UTC±0

Moghreb Tétouan (Morocco)	1–0	(Senegal) Casa Sports
Diallo 20' (o.g.)	Report

Saniat Rmel, Tetouan
Referee: Mohamed Farouk Mahmoud (Egypt)
3 March 2013
17:00 UTC±0

Casa Sports (Senegal)	1–0	(Morocco) Moghreb Tétouan
Ben Badji 90+4'	Report
Penalties
	3–1

Stade Demba Diop, Dakar
Referee: Juste Ephrem Zio (Burkina Faso)

1–1 on aggregate. Casa Sports won the penalty shoot-out and advanced to the first round.

16 February 2013
15:00 UTC+1

Kano Pillars (Nigeria)	5–1	(Central African Republic) Olympic Real de Bangui
Bello Musa 15'; Aliyu 38'; Nafiu 60', 89'; Aminu 66'	Report	Yabou 44'

Sani Abacha Stadium, Kano
Referee: Ousmane Sidibé (Mali)
3 March 2013
16:00 UTC+1

Olympic Real de Bangui (Central African Republic)	0–0	(Nigeria) Kano Pillars
	Report

Barthelemy Boganda Stadium, Bangui
Referee: Diosdado Nzibi (Equatorial Guinea)

Kano Pillars won 5–1 on aggregate and advanced to the first round.

17 February 2013
14:00 UTC+1

AC Léopards (Republic of the Congo)	2–0	(Gabon) CF Mounana
Ngouelou 4'; Lakolo 90+3'	Report

Stade Denis Sassou Nguesso, Dolisie
Referee: Thomas Onyango (Kenya)
3 March 2013
16:00 UTC+1

CF Mounana (Gabon)	1–0	(Republic of the Congo) AC Léopards
Sokambi 50'	Report

Stade Augustin Monédan de Sibang, Libreville
Referee: Moumouni Kiagou (Benin)

AC Léopards won 2–1 on aggregate and advanced to the first round.

17 February 2013
16:00 UTC+1

ASPAC (Benin)	1–1	(Burkina Faso) ASFA Yennenga
Bouraïma 62' (pen.)	Report	Tiendrébéogo 90+3'

Stade de l'Amitié, Cotonou
Referee: Emmanuel Neewon (Liberia)
3 March 2013
15:30 UTC±0

ASFA Yennenga (Burkina Faso)	1–1	(Benin) ASPAC
Ouattara 25'	Report	Johnson 83'
Penalties
	5–4

Stade du 4-Août, Ouagadougou
Referee: Benjamin Ekabatiem Odey (Nigeria)

2–2 on aggregate. ASFA Yennenga won the penalty shoot-out and advanced to the first round.

== First round ==
The first round included 32 teams: the 24 winners of the preliminary round, and the 8 teams that received byes to this round.

Team 1	Agg.	Team 2	1st leg	2nd leg
Zamalek (Egypt)	1–0	(Democratic Republic of the Congo) AS Vita Club	1–0	0–0
Saint George (Ethiopia)	3–1	(Mali) Djoliba	2–0	1–1
CA Bizertin (Tunisia)	3–1	(Zimbabwe) Dynamos	3–0	0–1
Tusker (Kenya)	1–4	(Egypt) Al-Ahly	1–2	0–2
Zanaco (Zambia)	1–3	(South Africa) Orlando Pirates	0–1	1–2
Mochudi Centre Chiefs (Botswana)	0–7	(Democratic Republic of the Congo) TP Mazembe	0–1	0–6
Vital'O (Burundi)	0–2	(Nigeria) Enugu Rangers	0–0	0–2
Recreativo do Libolo (Angola)	4–2	(Sudan) Al-Merrikh	2–1	2–1
JSM Béjaïa (Algeria)	1–1 (a)	(Ghana) Asante Kotoko	0–0	1–1
Primeiro de Agosto (Angola)	0–2	(Tunisia) Espérance de Tunis	0–1	0–1
FUS Rabat (Morocco)	3–1	(Cameroon) Union Douala	3–0	0–1
Séwé Sport (Ivory Coast)	5–4	(Sudan) Al-Hilal	4–1	1–3
AFAD Djékanou (Ivory Coast)	1–3	(Cameroon) Coton Sport	0–1	1–2
Casa Sports (Senegal)	1–4	(Mali) Stade Malien	1–2	0–2
Kano Pillars (Nigeria)	4–4 (a)	(Republic of the Congo) AC Léopards	4–1	0–3
ASFA Yennenga (Burkina Faso)	4–5	(Algeria) ES Sétif	2–1	2–4

15 March 2013
18:00 UTC+2

Zamalek (Egypt)	1–0	(Democratic Republic of the Congo) AS Vita Club
Gaafar 67'	Report

Borg El Arab Stadium, Alexandria
Referee: Gervais Munyanziza (Rwanda)
6 April 2013
15:30 UTC+1

AS Vita Club (Democratic Republic of the Congo)	0–0	(Egypt) Zamalek
	Report

Stade des Martyrs, Kinshasa
Referee: Joshua Bondo (Botswana)

Zamalek won 1–0 on aggregate and advanced to the second round.

17 March 2013
16:00 UTC+3

Saint George (Ethiopia)	2–0	(Mali) Djoliba
Birhanu 7'; Gebremariam 75'	Report

Addis Ababa Stadium, Addis Ababa
Referee: Ali Kalyango (Uganda)
7 April 2013
16:00 UTC±0

Djoliba (Mali)	1–1	(Ethiopia) Saint George
Diallo 28'	Report	Debebe 55'

Stade Modibo Kéïta, Bamako
Referee: William Agbovi (Ghana)

Saint George won 3–1 on aggregate and advanced to the second round.

17 March 2013
15:00 UTC+1

CA Bizertin (Tunisia)	3–0	(Zimbabwe) Dynamos
Machani 50'; Harran 58' (pen.); Jaziri 71'	Report

Stade 15 Octobre, Bizerte
Referee: El Fadil Mohamed (Sudan)
7 April 2013
15:00 UTC+2

Dynamos (Zimbabwe)	1–0	(Tunisia) CA Bizertin
Sekete 90+4'	Report

Rufaro Stadium, Harare
Referee: Victor Gomes (South Africa)

CA Bizertin won 3–1 on aggregate and advanced to the second round.

16 March 2013
16:00 UTC+3

Tusker (Kenya)	1–2	(Egypt) Al-Ahly
Were 59'	Report	Moteab 48', 57'

Nyayo National Stadium, Nairobi
Referee: Simanga Nhleko (Swaziland)
7 April 2013
19:00 UTC+2

Al-Ahly (Egypt)	2–0	(Kenya) Tusker
Abd El-Zaher 6'; Moteab 38'	Report

Borg El Arab Stadium, Alexandria
Referee: Eric Otogo-Castane (Gabon)

Al-Ahly won 4–1 on aggregate and advanced to the second round.

16 March 2013
15:00 UTC+2

Zanaco (Zambia)	0–1	(South Africa) Orlando Pirates
	Report	Mabena 6'

Nkoloma Stadium, Lusaka
Referee: Hélder Martins de Carvalho (Angola)
6 April 2013
20:15 UTC+2

Orlando Pirates (South Africa)	2–1	(Zambia) Zanaco
Masuku 19'; Makola 77'	Report	Mwape 49'

FNB Stadium, Johannesburg
Referee: Samuel Chirindza (Mozambique)

Orlando Pirates won 3–1 on aggregate and advanced to the second round.

16 March 2013
16:00 UTC+2

Mochudi Centre Chiefs (Botswana)	0–1	(Democratic Republic of the Congo) TP Mazembe
	Report	Samatta 80'

University of Botswana Stadium, Gaborone
Referee: Eric Gasinzigwa (Burundi)
7 April 2013
15:30 UTC+2

TP Mazembe (Democratic Republic of the Congo)	6–0	(Botswana) Mochudi Centre Chiefs
Kalaba 6', 35'; Mputu 15' (pen.), 80'; Samatta 75'; Nkulukuta 90'	Report

Stade TP Mazembe, Lubumbashi
Referee: Henry Ogunyamodi (Nigeria)

TP Mazembe won 7–0 on aggregate and advanced to the second round.

17 March 2013
15:30 UTC+2

Vital'O (Burundi)	0–0	(Nigeria) Enugu Rangers
	Report

Prince Louis Rwagasore Stadium, Bujumbura
Referee: Osiase Koto (Lesotho)
7 April 2013
15:00 UTC+1

Enugu Rangers (Nigeria)	2–0	(Burundi) Vital'O
Uche 2' (pen.); Yarehe 16'	Report

Nnamdi Azikiwe Stadium, Enugu
Referee: Djamel Haimoudi (Algeria)

Enugu Rangers won 2–0 on aggregate and advanced to the second round.

17 March 2013
15:00 UTC+1

Recreativo do Libolo (Angola)	2–1	(Sudan) Al-Merrikh
Dário 54'; Camara 76'		Ramadan 45'

Estádio Municipal de Calulo, Calulo
Referee: Hamada Nampiandraza (Madagascar)
6 April 2013
20:00 UTC+3

Al-Merrikh (Sudan)	1–2	(Angola) Recreativo do Libolo
Abdel-Aati 82'		Rasca 69'; Sidnei 90+2'

Al-Merreikh Stadium, Omdurman
Referee: Koman Coulibaly (Mali)

Recreativo do Libolo won 4–2 on aggregate and advanced to the second round.

15 March 2013
19:00 UTC+1

JSM Béjaïa (Algeria)	0–0	(Ghana) Asante Kotoko
	Report

Stade de l'Unité Maghrébine, Béjaïa
Referee: Ousmane Fall (Senegal)
7 April 2013
14:00 UTC±0

Asante Kotoko (Ghana)	1–1	(Algeria) JSM Béjaïa
Akuffu 45'	Report	Derrag 72'

Baba Yara Stadium, Kumasi
Referee: Bakary Gassama (Gambia)

1–1 on aggregate. JSM Béjaïa won on the away goals rule and advanced to the second round.

17 March 2013
17:00 UTC+1

Primeiro de Agosto (Angola)	0–1	(Tunisia) Espérance de Tunis
	Report	Msakni 44'

Estádio dos Coqueiros, Luanda
Referee: Rajindraparsad Seechurn (Mauritius)
6 April 2013
15:00 UTC+1

Espérance de Tunis (Tunisia)	1–0	(Angola) Primeiro de Agosto
Chammam 88' (pen.)	Report

Stade Olympique de Radès, Radès
Referee: Walid Tamuni (Libya)

Espérance de Tunis won 2–0 on aggregate and advanced to the second round.

15 March 2013
16:00 UTC±0

FUS Rabat (Morocco)	3–0	(Cameroon) Union Douala
El Bahri 8'; Saâdane 50'; Fouzair 69'	Report

Prince Moulay Abdellah Stadium, Rabat
Referee: Mohamed Said Kordi (Tunisia)
7 April 2013
14:30 UTC+1

Union Douala (Cameroon)	1–0	(Morocco) FUS Rabat
Moundi 38'	Report

Stade de la Réunification, Douala
Referee: Mensur Maeruf (Eritrea)

FUS Rabat won 3–1 on aggregate and advanced to the second round.

16 March 2013
15:30 UTC±0

Séwé Sport (Ivory Coast)	4–1	(Sudan) Al-Hilal
Assalé 16'; Mandela 51', 81'; Zougoula 59'	Report	Traoré 75'

Stade Robert Champroux, Abidjan
Referee: Gehad Grisha (Egypt)
5 April 2013
20:00 UTC+3

Al-Hilal (Sudan)	3–1	(Ivory Coast) Séwé Sport
Muhannad El Tahir 30'; Bishah 48'; Traoré 80'	Report	Kakou 90+2'

Al-Hilal Stadium, Omdurman
Referee: Wellington Kamoa (Zambia)

Séwé Sport won 5–4 on aggregate and advanced to the second round.

17 March 2013
15:30 UTC±0

AFAD Djékanou (Ivory Coast)	0–1	(Cameroon) Coton Sport
	Report	Yougouda 65'

Stade Robert Champroux, Abidjan
Referee: Bouchaïb El Ahrach (Morocco)
7 April 2013
14:30 UTC+1

Coton Sport (Cameroon)	2–1	(Ivory Coast) AFAD Djékanou
Yougouda 10'; Eloundou 82'	Report	Soro Nanga 30'

Roumdé Adjia Stadium, Garoua
Referee: Anthony Raphael (Malawi)

Coton Sport won 3–1 on aggregate and advanced to the second round.

17 March 2013
17:00 UTC±0

Casa Sports (Senegal)	1–2	(Mali) Stade Malien
Dramé 45+1'	Report	Mamadou Coulibaly 25'; Moussa Coulibaly 59'

Stade Demba Diop, Dakar
Referee: Davies Omweno (Kenya)
6 April 2013
17:00 UTC±0

Stade Malien (Mali)	2–0	(Senegal) Casa Sports
Koïta 31'; Cissoko 65'	Report

Stade Modibo Kéïta, Bamako
Referee: Néant Alioum (Cameroon)

Stade Malien won 4–1 on aggregate and advanced to the second round.

16 March 2013
16:00 UTC+1

Kano Pillars (Nigeria)	4–1	(Republic of the Congo) AC Léopards
Musa 9', 45'; Ubale 52'; Umar 90'	Report	Dramé 71'

Sani Abacha Stadium, Kano
Referee: Rédouane Jiyed (Morocco)
6 April 2013
14:00 UTC+1

AC Léopards (Republic of the Congo)	3–0	(Nigeria) Kano Pillars
Dramé 30', 90'; Kalema 56' (pen.)	Report

Stade Denis Sassou Nguesso, Dolisie
Referee: Noumandiez Doué (Ivory Coast)

4–4 on aggregate. AC Léopards won on the away goals rule and advanced to the second round.

16 March 2013
16:00 UTC±0

ASFA Yennenga (Burkina Faso)	2–1	(Algeria) ES Sétif
Ouédraogo 71'; Sango 81'	Report	Aoudia 3'

Stade du 4-Août, Ouagadougou
Referee: Yakhouba Keita (Guinea)
5 April 2013
18:00 UTC+1

ES Sétif (Algeria)	4–2	(Burkina Faso) ASFA Yennenga
Aoudia 25'; Madouni 40', 60'; Gourmi 51'	Report	Kaboré 89'; Yaméogo 90'

Stade 8 Mai 1945, Sétif
Referee: Ali Lemghaifry (Mauritania)

ES Sétif won 5–4 on aggregate and advanced to the second round.

== Second round ==
The second round included the 16 winners of the first round. The winners of each tie advanced to the group stage, while the losers entered the Confederation Cup play-off round.

Team 1	Agg.	Team 2	1st leg	2nd leg
Zamalek (Egypt)	3–3 (a)	(Ethiopia) Saint George	1–1	2–2
CA Bizertin (Tunisia)	1–2	(Egypt) Al-Ahly	0–0	1–2
Orlando Pirates (South Africa)	3–2	(Democratic Republic of the Congo) TP Mazembe	3–1	0–1
Enugu Rangers (Nigeria)	1–3	(Angola) Recreativo do Libolo	0–0	1–3
JSM Béjaïa (Algeria)	0–1	(Tunisia) Espérance de Tunis	0–0	0–1
FUS Rabat (Morocco)	1–1 (a)	(Ivory Coast) Séwé Sport	1–1	0–0
Coton Sport (Cameroon)	3–0	(Mali) Stade Malien	3–0	0–0
AC Léopards (Republic of the Congo)	4–4 (5–4 p)	(Algeria) ES Sétif	3–1	1–3

20 April 2013
19:00 UTC+2

Zamalek (Egypt)	1–1	(Ethiopia) Saint George
Cissé 83'	Report	Oumed 67'

30 June Stadium, Cairo
Referee: Rajindraparsad Seechurn (Mauritius)
5 May 2013
16:00 UTC+3

Saint George (Ethiopia)	2–2	(Egypt) Zamalek
Shimelis 14'; Isinde 43'	Report	Cissé 2', 87'

Addis Ababa Stadium, Addis Ababa
Referee: Janny Sikazwe (Zambia)

3–3 on aggregate. Zamalek won on the away goals rule and advanced to the group stage. Saint George entered the Confederation Cup play-off round.

21 April 2013
15:00 UTC+1

CA Bizertin (Tunisia)	0–0	(Egypt) Al-Ahly
	Report

Stade 15 Octobre, Bizerte
Referee: Tessema Bamlak (Ethiopia)
5 May 2013
19:00 UTC+2

Al-Ahly (Egypt)	2–1	(Tunisia) CA Bizertin
Barakat 47' (pen.); Moteab 63'	Report	Hadhria 65' (pen.)

30 June Stadium, Cairo
Referee: Bouchaïb El Ahrach (Morocco)

Al-Ahly won 2–1 on aggregate and advanced to the group stage. CA Bizertin entered the Confederation Cup play-off round.

20 April 2013
20:15 UTC+2

Orlando Pirates (South Africa)	3–1	(Democratic Republic of the Congo) TP Mazembe
Okonkwo 2'; Mbesuma 57', 90+2' (pen.)	Report	Kabangu 45'

Orlando Stadium, Johannesburg
Referee: Badara Diatta (Senegal)
5 May 2013
15:30 UTC+2

TP Mazembe (Democratic Republic of the Congo)	1–0	(South Africa) Orlando Pirates
Kasusula 79'	Report

Stade TP Mazembe, Lubumbashi
Referee: Bernard Camille (Seychelles)

Orlando Pirates won 3–2 on aggregate and advanced to the group stage. TP Mazembe entered the Confederation Cup play-off round.

21 April 2013
16:00 UTC+1

Enugu Rangers (Nigeria)	0–0	(Angola) Recreativo do Libolo

Nnamdi Azikiwe Stadium, Enugu
Referee: Gehad Grisha (Egypt)
4 May 2013
15:00 UTC+1

Recreativo do Libolo (Angola)	3–1	(Nigeria) Enugu Rangers
Camara 16'; Dário 32', 74' (pen.)		Mba 56'

Estádio Municipal de Calulo, Calulo
Referee: Eric Otogo-Castane (Gabon)

Recreativo do Libolo won 3–1 on aggregate and advanced to the group stage. Enugu Rangers entered the Confederation Cup play-off round.

20 April 2013
18:00 UTC+1

JSM Béjaïa (Algeria)	0–0	(Tunisia) Espérance de Tunis
	Report

Stade de l'Unité Maghrébine, Béjaïa
Referee: Koman Coulibaly (Mali)
4 May 2013
16:00 UTC+1

Espérance de Tunis (Tunisia)	1–0	(Algeria) JSM Béjaïa
Chammam 77' (pen.)	Report

Stade Olympique de Radès, Radès
Referee: Yakhouba Keita (Guinea)

Espérance de Tunis won 1–0 on aggregate and advanced to the group stage. JSM Béjaïa entered the Confederation Cup play-off round.

21 April 2013
19:00 UTC±0

FUS Rabat (Morocco)	1–1	(Ivory Coast) Séwé Sport
El Bahri 69'	Report	Zougoula 80'

Prince Moulay Abdellah Stadium, Rabat
Referee: Hélder Martins de Carvalho (Angola)
4 May 2013
15:30 UTC±0

Séwé Sport (Ivory Coast)	0–0	(Morocco) FUS Rabat
	Report

Stade Robert Champroux, Abidjan
Referee: Bakary Gassama (Gambia)

1–1 on aggregate. Séwé Sport won on the away goals rule and advanced to the group stage. FUS Rabat entered the Confederation Cup play-off round.

21 April 2013
15:30 UTC+1

Coton Sport (Cameroon)	3–0	(Mali) Stade Malien
Yougouda 15', 23'; Mbang 88'	Report

Roumdé Adjia Stadium, Garoua
Referee: Daniel Bennett (South Africa)
4 May 2013
18:00 UTC±0

Stade Malien (Mali)	0–0	(Cameroon) Coton Sport
	Report

Stade Modibo Kéïta, Bamako
Referee: Noumandiez Doué (Ivory Coast)

Coton Sport won 3–0 on aggregate and advanced to the group stage. Stade Malien entered the Confederation Cup play-off round.

21 April 2013
15:30 UTC+1

AC Léopards (Republic of the Congo)	3–1	(Algeria) ES Sétif
Bhebey Ndey 36'; Dramé 45'; Kalema 90' (pen.)	Report	Aoudia 68'

Stade Denis Sassou Nguesso, Dolisie
Referee: Adam Cordier (Chad)
3 May 2013
18:00 UTC+1

ES Sétif (Algeria)	3–1	(Republic of the Congo) AC Léopards
Djahnit 21'; Delhoum 39', 90+2'	Report	Bhebey Ndey 14'
Penalties
	4–5

Stade 8 Mai 1945, Sétif
Referee: William Agbovi (Ghana)

4–4 on aggregate. AC Léopards won the penalty shoot-out and advanced to the group stage. ES Sétif entered the Confederation Cup play-off round.
