= 2013–14 Espérance Sportive de Tunis season =

Espérance de Tunis 2013–14 football season

Espérance de Tunis
2013–14 season
- President: Hamdi Meddeb
- Head coach: Maher Kanzari (until 21 October); Skander Kasri^{c} (22 October to 2 December); Sébastien Desabre (3 December to 18 January); Ruud Krol (19 January to 25 May); Sébastien Desabre (from 26 May)
- Stadium: Stade Olympique de Radès
- Ligue 1: Winners
- Tunisian Cup: Quarter-finals
- Champions League: 2013: Semi-finals; 2014: Group stage
- Top goalscorer: League: Ahmed Akaïchi (11); All: Ahmed Akaïchi (15)
- Biggest win: Espérance de Tunis 5–0 Stade Tunisien (3 November 2013); Espérance de Tunis 5–0 Gor Mahia (10 March 2014)
- Biggest defeat: Club Africain 2–0 Espérance de Tunis (30 November 2013)

The 2013–14 Espérance Sportive de Tunis season was the 95th season in existence and the club's 59th consecutive season in the top flight of Tunisian football. In addition to the domestic league, Espérance de Tunis are participated in the Tunisian Cup and the CAF Champions League for 2013 and 2014 editions.

== Squad list ==
Note: Flags indicate national team as has been defined under FIFA eligibility rules. Players may hold more than one non-FIFA nationality.

No.	Nat.	Name	Date of Birth (Age)	Signed from
Goalkeepers
1	(Tunisia)	Moez Ben Cherifia	24 June 1991 (aged 22)	(Tunisia) Youth system
16	(Tunisia)	Ali Jemal	9 June 1990 (aged 24)	(Tunisia) Youth system
22	(Tunisia)	Wassim Nouara	26 January 1986 (aged 28)	(Tunisia) CS Korba
Defenders
2	(Tunisia)	Seifeddine Akremi	2 April 1990 (aged 24)	(Tunisia) US Monastir
3	(Tunisia)	Arbi Jabeur	25 May 1985 (aged 29)	(Tunisia) CA Bizertin
5	(Tunisia)	Chamseddine Dhaouadi	16 January 1987 (aged 27)	(Tunisia) Étoile du Sahel
6	(Cameroon)	Aminou Bouba	28 January 1991 (aged 23)	(Cameroon) Coton Sport
12	(Tunisia)	Khalil Chemmam (C)	24 July 1987 (aged 26)	(Tunisia) Youth system
17	(Tunisia)	Sameh Derbali	23 November 1986 (aged 27)	(Tunisia) Youth system
20	(Tunisia)	Mohamed Ben Mansour	19 July 1988 (aged 25)	(Tunisia) Youth system
24	(Tunisia)	Iheb Mbarki	14 February 1992 (aged 22)	(France) Evian
26	(Ghana)	Harrison Afful	24 July 1986 (aged 27)	Feyenoord Ghana
28	(Tunisia)	Mohamed Amine Nefzi	19 July 1988 (aged 25)	(Tunisia) CS Hammam-Lif
Midfielders
4	(Tunisia)	Hocine Ragued	11 February 1983 (aged 31)	(Turkey) Kardemir Karabükspor
8	(Tunisia)	Idriss Mhirsi	21 February 1994 (aged 20)	(Tunisia) Youth system
10	(Tunisia)	Oussama Darragi	3 April 1987 (aged 27)	(Switzerland) Sion
13	(Cameroon)	Thierry Makon Nloga	9 October 1993 (aged 20)	(Cameroon) New Star
19	(Tunisia)	Khaled Mouelhi	13 February 1981 (aged 33)	(Norway) Lillestrøm
21	(Tunisia)	Mejdi Traoui	13 December 1983 (aged 30)	(Austria) Salzburg
23	(Tunisia)	Mouez Aboud	18 July 1996 (aged 17)	(Tunisia) Youth system
30	(Tunisia)	Iheb Msakni	13 July 1988 (aged 25)	(Tunisia) Stade Tunisien
Forwards
7	(Tunisia)	Mohamed Ali Mhadhebi	7 August 1990 (aged 23)	(Tunisia) CA Bizertin
9	(Tunisia)	Ahmed Akaïchi	23 February 1989 (aged 25)	(Germany) Ingolstadt
11	(Algeria)	Youcef Belaïli	14 March 1992 (aged 22)	(Algeria) MC Oran
14	(Tunisia)	Haythem Jouini	7 May 1993 (aged 21)	(Tunisia) Youth system
15	(Cameroon)	Yannick N'Djeng	11 March 1990 (aged 24)	(Switzerland) Sion
18	(Tunisia)	Khaled Gharsellaoui	29 July 1990 (aged 23)	(Tunisia) EGS Gafsa
25	(Guinea)	Daouda Camara	12 March 1994 (aged 20)	(Tunisia) Youth system

== Competitions ==
=== Overview ===
Competition	Record								Starting round	Final position / round	First match	Last match
Competition	G	W	D	L	GF	GA	GD	Win %	Starting round	Final position / round	First match	Last match
Ligue 1	30	19	9	2	48	15	+33	63.33	—N/a	Winners	26 September 2013	11 May 2014
Tunisian Cup	3	2	0	1	7	4	+3	66.67	Round of 32	Quarter-finals	20 April 2014	15 June 2014
Champions League 2013	8	5	2	1	10	5	+5	62.50	Group stage	Semi-finals	21 July 2013	19 October 2013
Champions League 2014	7	4	1	2	17	9	+8	57.14	First round	Group stage	1 March 2014	8 June 2014
Total	48	30	12	6	82	33	+49	62.50			21 July 2013	15 June 2014

Source: Competitions

=== Ligue 1 ===
==== League table ====
Pos	Team	Pld	W	D	L	GF	GA	GD	Pts	Qualification or relegation
1	Espérance de Tunis	30	19	9	2	48	15	+33	66	Qualification to the 2015 CAF Champions League
2	CS Sfaxien	30	17	6	7	36	20	+16	57	Qualification to the 2015 CAF Champions League
3	Étoile du Sahel	30	15	11	4	36	15	+21	56	Qualification to the 2015 CAF Confederation Cup (Note: Club Africain qualified to CAF Confederation Cup since the winners of the Tunisian Cup and the runners-up already qualified to African competitions after finishing in the 3rd and 2nd position respectively.)
4	Club Africain	30	15	9	6	29	20	+9	54	Qualification to the 2015 CAF Confederation Cup
5	AS Marsa	30	12	6	12	28	27	+1	42	

Source: Ligue 1
Rules for classification: 1) points; 2) goal difference; 3) number of goals scored.

==== Results by round ====
Round	1	2	3	4	5	6	7	8	9	10	11	12	13	14	15	16	17	18	19	20	21	22	23	24	25	26	27	28	29	30
Ground	A	H	A	H	A	H	A	H	A	H	A	H	A	H	H	H	A	H	A	H	A	H	A	H	A	H	A	H	A	A
Result	W	D	W	W	W	W	L	W	D	W	D	W	D	W	W	W	D	W	W	W	D	W	W	D	D	W	W	W	L	D

Source: Competitive matches
A = Away; H = Home; W = Win; D = Draw; L = Loss

==== Matches ====
26 September 2013 Round 1	CA Bizertin	0–1	Espérance de Tunis	Bizerte
15:00		Report	Akaïchi 72'	Stadium: Stade 15 Octobre; Referee: Hichem Barkallah

29 September 2013 Round 2	Espérance de Tunis	2–2	Étoile du Sahel	Tunis
15:00	Msakni 64'; Akaïchi 86'	Report	Brigui 23'; Michaïlou 31'	Stadium: Stade Olympique de Radès; Referee: Selim Jedidi

30 October 2013 Round 3	Grombalia Sports	0–1	Espérance de Tunis	Grombalia
14:30		Report	N'Djeng 26'	Stadium: Stade Mohsen Hadded; Referee: Sadok Selmi

3 November 2013 Round 4	Espérance de Tunis	5–0	Stade Tunisien	Tunis
14:30	Afful 30'; Akaïchi 36', 70'; Jouini 78'; Darragi 88'	Report		Stadium: Stade Olympique de Radès; Referee: Maher Harrabi

9 November 2013 Round 5	ES Métlaoui	1–2	Espérance de Tunis	Métlaoui
14:30	Camara 30'	Report	Belaïli 78'; Darragi 83'	Stadium: Stade Municipal de Métlaoui; Referee: Adel Sghaier

24 November 2013 Round 6	Espérance de Tunis	1–0	JS Kairouan	Tunis
14:30	Dhaouadi 90+4'	Report		Stadium: Stade El Menzah; Referee: Wassim Ben Saleh

30 November 2013 Round 7	Club Africain	2–0	Espérance de Tunis	Tunis
14:30	Dhaouadi 25', 84'	Report		Stadium: Stade Olympique de Radès; Referee: Adel Sghaier

18 December 2013 Round 8	Espérance de Tunis	2–1	CS Sfaxien	Tunis
14:00	Darragi 63' (pen.); Ben Mansour 80'	Report	Jouini 72' (o.g.)	Stadium: Stade Olympique de Radès; Referee: Slim Belkhouas

22 December 2013 Round 9	Olympique Béja	0–0	Espérance de Tunis	Béja
14:00		Report		Stadium: Stade Boujemaa Kmiti; Referee: Mohamed Said Kordi

25 December 2013 Round 10	Espérance de Tunis	4–0	LPS Tozeur	Tunis
14:00	Darragi 22'; Afful 30'; Mhirsi 61'; Gharsellaoui 75'	Report		Stadium: Stade El Menzah; Referee: Nasrallah Jaouadi

29 December 2013 Round 11	Stade Gabèsien	1–1	Espérance de Tunis	Gabès
14:00	Aloenouvo 38'	Report	Akaïchi 87'	Stadium: Stade Municipal de Gabès; Referee: Sadok Selmi

4 January 2014 Round 12	Espérance de Tunis	3–0	EGS Gafsa	Tunis
14:00	Nefzi 6'; Ouerghemmi 29' (o.g.); Belaïli 87'	Report		Stadium: Stade Olympique de Radès; Referee: Yassine Harrouch

8 January 2014 Round 13	US Monastir	1–1	Espérance de Tunis	Monastir
14:00	Ait Lachkar 24'	Report	Akaïchi 70'	Stadium: Stade Mustapha Ben Jannet; Referee: Ghazi Ben Ghezaïel

18 January 2014 Round 14	Espérance de Tunis	3–0	CS Hammam-Lif	Tunis
14:00	Akaïchi 9', 10'; Darragi 69'	Report		Stadium: Stade Olympique de Radès; Referee: Nasrallah Jaouadi

25 January 2014 Round 15	Espérance de Tunis	1–0	AS Marsa	Tunis
14:00	Darragi 2'	Report		Stadium: Stade El Menzah; Referee: Youssef Sraïri

1 February 2014 Round 16	Espérance de Tunis	2–1	CA Bizertin	Tunis
14:00	N'Djeng 27'; Darragi 47'	Report	Mbengué 72'	Stadium: Stade Olympique de Radès; Referee: Yassine Harrouch

5 February 2014 Round 17	Étoile du Sahel	0–0	Espérance de Tunis	Sousse
14:00		Report		Stadium: Stade Olympique de Sousse; Referee: Selim Jedidi

9 February 2014 Round 18	Espérance de Tunis	4–2	Grombalia Sports	Tunis
14:00	N'Djeng 41', 88'; Mbarki 45+3'; Msakni 62'	Report	Mogaadi 20'; Lahbibi 54'	Stadium: Stade Olympique de Radès; Referee: Anis Ben Hassen

15 February 2014 Round 19	Stade Tunisien	0–2	Espérance de Tunis	Tunis
14:00		Report	Afful 18'; Darragi 55'	Stadium: Stade Chedly Zouiten; Referee: Ghazi Ben Ghezaïel

22 February 2014 Round 20	Espérance de Tunis	3–1	ES Métlaoui	Tunis
14:00	Mhadhebi 22'; Msakni 62'; N'Djeng 74'	Report	Meniaoui 25'	Stadium: Stade Olympique de Radès; Referee: Hichem Barkallah

16 March 2014 Round 22	Espérance de Tunis	2–0	Club Africain	Tunis
14:30	Chemmam 14'; Jouini 65'	Report		Stadium: Stade Olympique de Radès; Referee: Haithem Kossai

26 March 2014 Round 21	JS Kairouan	0–0	Espérance de Tunis	Kairouan
14:30		Report		Stadium: Stade Ali Zouaoui; Referee: Mohamed Said Kordi

2 April 2014 Round 23	CS Sfaxien	0–1	Espérance de Tunis	Sfax
14:30		Report	Afful 53'	Stadium: Stade Taïeb Mhiri; Referee: Selim Jedidi

6 April 2014 Round 24	Espérance de Tunis	0–0	Olympique Béja	Tunis
14:30		Report		Stadium: Stade Olympique de Radès; Referee: Anis Ben Hassen

9 April 2014 Round 25	LPS Tozeur	1–1	Espérance de Tunis	Tozeur
15:00	Korda 85'	Report	Bouba 28'	Stadium: Stade de Tozeur; Referee: Slim Belkhouas

13 April 2014 Round 26	Espérance de Tunis	2–0	Stade Gabèsien	Tunis
15:00	Mouelhi 27'; Akaïchi 54'	Report		Stadium: Stade Olympique de Radès; Referee: Mohamed Chaabane

30 April 2014 Round 27	EGS Gafsa	0–2	Espérance de Tunis	Gafsa
16:00		Report	Akaïchi 18'; Msakni 90+3'	Stadium: Stade Olympique de Gafsa; Referee: Nasrallah Jaouadi

4 May 2014 Round 28	Espérance de Tunis	1–0	US Monastir	Tunis
16:00	Ragued 52'	Report		Stadium: Stade Olympique de Radès; Referee: Walid Jeridi

7 May 2014 Round 29	CS Hammam-Lif	1–0	Espérance de Tunis	Tunis
16:00	Ben Romdhane 22' (pen.)	Report		Stadium: Stade Chedly Zouiten; Referee: Ameur Chouchane

11 May 2014 Round 30	AS Marsa	1–1	Espérance de Tunis	Tunis
16:00	Ben Messaoud 4'	Report	Akaïchi 40'	Stadium: Stade Abdelaziz Chtioui; Referee: Haythem Guirat

==== Results summary ====
Overall								Home						Away					
Pld	W	D	L	GF	GA	GD	Pts	W	D	L	GF	GA	GD	W	D	L	GF	GA	GD
30	19	9	2	48	15	+33	66	13	2	0	33	5	+28	6	7	2	15	10	+5

Source: Competitive matches

=== Tunisian Cup ===
20 April 2014 Round of 32	Espérance de Tunis	3–1	Olympique Béja	Tunis
				Stadium: Stade Olympique de Radès

12 June 2014 Round of 16	Espérance de Tunis	3–1	CS Hammam-Lif	Tunis
15:30				Stadium: Stade Olympique de Radès

15 June 2014 Quarter-finals	Espérance de Tunis	1–2	CS Sfaxien	Tunis
15:30				Stadium: Stade Olympique de Radès; Referee: Haithem Kosai

=== 2013 CAF Champions League ===
==== Group stage ====
Group B

Pos	Team	Pld	W	D	L	GF	GA	GD	Pts	Qualification	EST	COT	SEW	LIB
1	(Tunisia) Espérance de Tunis	6	5	0	1	9	4	+5	15	Advance to knockout stage	—	2–0	1–0	3–2
2	(Cameroon) Coton Sport	6	2	2	2	5	6	−1	8	Advance to knockout stage	1–2	—	1–0	2–1
3	(Ivory Coast) Séwé Sport	6	1	2	3	5	6	−1	5 (Note: Séwé Sport are ranked ahead of Recreativo do Libolo on head-to-head record.)		0–1	0–0	—	3–1
4	(Angola) Recreativo do Libolo	6	1	2	3	8	11	−3	5		1–0	1–1	2–2	—

Updated to match(es) played on unknown. Source: CAF
Notes:

21 July 2013 Matchday 1	Recreativo do Libolo (Angola)	1–0	(Tunisia) Espérance de Tunis	Calulo
15:30 UTC+1	Aguinaldo 90+4'	Report		Stadium: Estádio Municipal de Calulo; Referee: Janny Sikazwe (Zambia)

3 August 2013 Matchday 2	Espérance de Tunis (Tunisia)	2–0	(Cameroon) Coton Sport	Tunis
22:00 UTC+1	Belaïli 61'; Msakni 90+1'	Report		Stadium: Stade Olympique de Radès; Referee: Gehad Grisha (Egypt)

18 August 2013 Matchday 3	Séwé Sport (Ivory Coast)	0–1	(Tunisia) Espérance de Tunis	Abidjan
15:30 UTC±0		Report	Darragi 48'	Stadium: Stade Robert Champroux; Referee: Ousmane Fall (Senegal)

31 August 2013 Matchday 4	Espérance de Tunis (Tunisia)	1–0	(Ivory Coast) Séwé Sport	Tunis
20:00 UTC+1	Yahia 58'	Report		Stadium: Stade Olympique de Radès; Referee: Djamel Haimoudi (Algeria)

14 September 2013 Matchday 5	Espérance de Tunis (Tunisia)	3–2	(Angola) Recreativo do Libolo	Tunis
20:00 UTC+1	N'Djeng 2', 80'; Darragi 53'	Report	Rúben Gouveia 46', 55'	Stadium: Stade Olympique de Radès; Referee: Daniel Bennett (South Africa)

21 September 2013 Matchday 6	Coton Sport (Cameroon)	1–2	(Tunisia) Espérance de Tunis	Garoua
15:00 UTC+1	Kamilou 90+1'	Report	Gharsellaoui 7'; Akaïchi 24'	Stadium: Roumdé Adjia Stadium; Referee: Hamada Nampiandraza (Madagascar)

==== Knock-out stage ====
===== Semi-finals =====
5 October 2013 First leg	Orlando Pirates (South Africa)	0–0	(Tunisia) Espérance de Tunis	Johannesburg
18:00 UTC+2		Report		Stadium: Orlando Stadium; Referee: Bouchaïb El Ahrach (Morocco

19 October 2013 Second leg	Espérance de Tunis (Tunisia)	1–1 (1–1 agg.)	(South Africa) Orlando Pirates	Tunis
19:00 UTC+1	Msakni 55'	Report	Mahamutsa 52'	Stadium: Stade Olympique de Radès; Referee: Eric Otogo-Castane (Gabon)

=== 2014 CAF Champions League ===
==== Qualifying rounds ====
===== First round =====
1 March 2014 First leg	Gor Mahia (Kenya)	2–3	(Tunisia) Espérance de Tunis	Nairobi
16:00 UTC+3	Sserunkuma 13' (pen.); Shakava 77'	Report	Akaïchi 25'; N'Djeng 62'; Jouini 89'	Stadium: Nyayo National Stadium; Referee: Bouchaïb El Ahrach (Morocco)

10 March 2014 Second leg	Espérance de Tunis (Tunisia)	5–0 (8–2 agg.)	(Kenya) Gor Mahia	Tunis
16:00 UTC+1	Jouini 45', 49', 57'; Afful 55'; Mhirsi 75'	Report		Stadium: Stade Olympique de Radès; Referee: Daniel Bennett (South Africa)

===== Second round =====
22 March 2014 First leg	AS Real Bamako (Mali)	1–1	(Tunisia) Espérance de Tunis	Bamako
16:30 UTC±0	Doumbia 78'	Report	Jouini 27'	Stadium: Stade Modibo Kéïta; Referee: Joshua Bondo (Botswana)

30 March 2014 Second leg	Espérance de Tunis (Tunisia)	3–0 (4–1 agg.)	(Mali) AS Real Bamako	Tunis
16:00 UTC+1	Jouini 33'; Msakni 53'; Afful 84'	Report		Stadium: Stade Olympique de Radès; Referee: Tessema Bamlak (Ethiopia)

==== Group stage ====
Group B

Pos	Team	Pld	W	D	L	GF	GA	GD	Pts		CSS	ESS	EST	AHB
1	(Tunisia) CS Sfaxien	6	3	2	1	8	5	+3	11	Advance to knockout stage	—	1–1	1–0	3–1
2	(Algeria) ES Sétif	6	2	4	0	9	6	+3	10	Advance to knockout stage	1–1	—	2–2	1–1
3	(Tunisia) Espérance de Tunis	6	2	1	3	8	9	−1	7		2–1	1–2	—	1–0
4	(Libya) Al-Ahly Benghazi	6	1	1	4	5	10	−5	4		0–1	0–2	3–2	—

Source: CAF
Rules for classification: Group stage tiebreakers

17 May 2014 Matchday 1	Espérance de Tunis (Tunisia)	1–2	(Algeria) ES Sétif	Tunis
20:00 UTC+1	Mhirsi 54'	Report	Nadji 24'; Belameiri 48'	Stadium: Stade Olympique de Radès; Referee: Aboubacar Mario Bangoura (Guinea)

24 May 2014 Matchday 2	Al-Ahly Benghazi (Libya)	3–2	(Tunisia) Espérance de Tunis	Sfax (Tunisia)
19:00 UTC+1	Sadomba 4'; Farag 12'; Orkuma 44'	Report	Akaïchi 20'; Darragi 78'	Stadium: Stade Taïeb Mhiri; Referee: Koman Coulibaly (Mali)

8 June 2014 Matchday 3	Espérance de Tunis (Tunisia)	2–1	(Tunisia) CS Sfaxien	Tunis
19:00 UTC+1	Darragi 65'; Mhirsi 66'	Report	Hannachi 47'	Stadium: Stade Olympique de Radès; Referee: Rajindraparsad Seechurn (Mauritius)
