= 2013 CAF Champions League final =

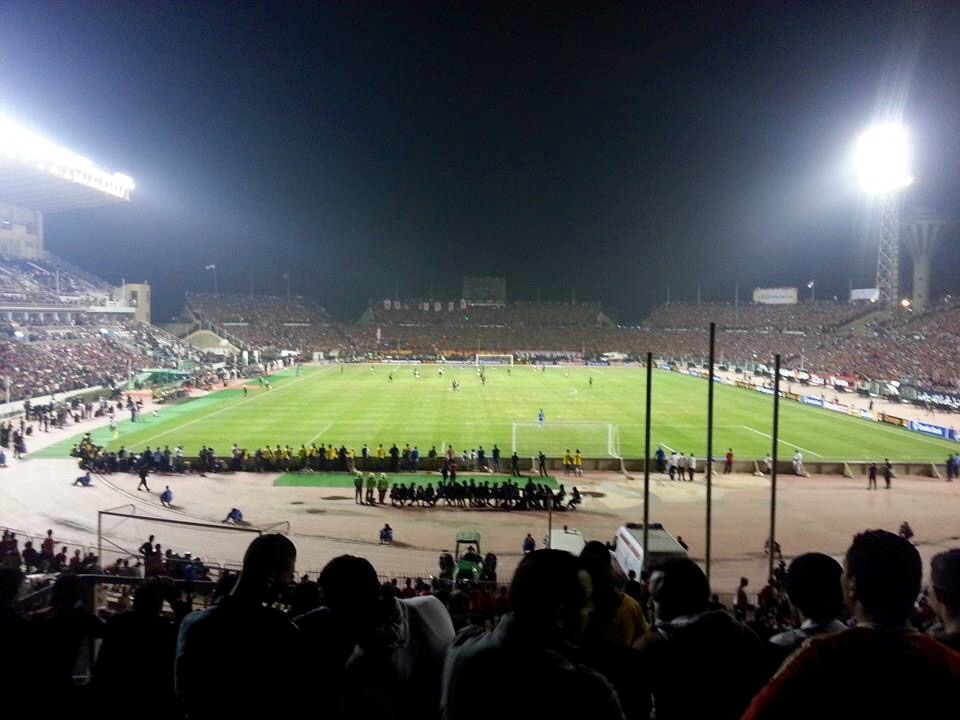
- Osman Ahmed Osman Stadium hosted the podium where Al Ahly lifted the trophy
- Event: 2013 CAF Champions League
Orlando Pirates	Al-Ahly
(South Africa)	(Egypt)
1	3
- on aggregate

First leg
Orlando Pirates	Al-Ahly
1	1
- Date: 2 November 2013
- Venue: Orlando Stadium, Johannesburg
- Referee: Djamel Haimoudi (Algeria)
- Attendance: 40,000

Second leg
Al-Ahly	Orlando Pirates
2	0
- Date: 10 November 2013
- Venue: Osman Ahmed Osman Stadium, Cairo
- Referee: Bakary Gassama (Gambia)
- Attendance: 35,000

The 2013 CAF Champions League final was the final of the 2013 CAF Champions League, the 49th edition of Africa's premier club football tournament organized by the Confederation of African Football (CAF), and the 17th edition under the current CAF Champions League format.

The final was contested in two-legged home-and-away format between Orlando Pirates of South Africa and Al-Ahly of Egypt. The first leg was hosted by Orlando Pirates at the Orlando Stadium in Johannesburg on 2 November 2013, while the second leg was hosted by Al-Ahly at the Osman Ahmed Osman Stadium in Cairo on 10 November 2013. The winner earned the right to represent the CAF at the 2013 FIFA Club World Cup, entering at the quarterfinal stage, as well as play in the 2014 CAF Super Cup against the winner of the 2013 CAF Confederation Cup.

After the first leg ended in a 1–1 draw, Al-Ahly won the second leg 2–0, and were crowned African club champions for a record eighth time.

== Qualified teams ==
In the following table, finals until 1996 were in the African Cup of Champions Club era, since 1997 were in the CAF Champions League era.

Team	Region	Previous finals appearances (bold indicates winners)
(South Africa) Orlando Pirates	COSAFA (Southern Africa)	**1995**
(Egypt) Al Ahly	UNAF (North Africa)	**1982**, 1983, **1987**, **2001**, **2005**, **2006**, 2007, **2008**, **2012**

== Background ==
Al-Ahly were the defending champions, and also the most successful club in the African Champions Cup/CAF Champions League, reaching a total of nine finals, winning seven (1982, 1987, 2001, 2005, 2006, 2008, 2012) and losing two (1983, 2007).

Orlando Pirates were the only South African club to have been crowned African club champion, having won the final in 1995.

The two teams had met in the group stage, with Orlando Pirates winning in Egypt 3–0, then earning a goalless draw at home on the last matchday against an already-qualified Al-Ahly to clinch a spot in the semifinals.

== Venues ==
=== Orlando Stadium ===
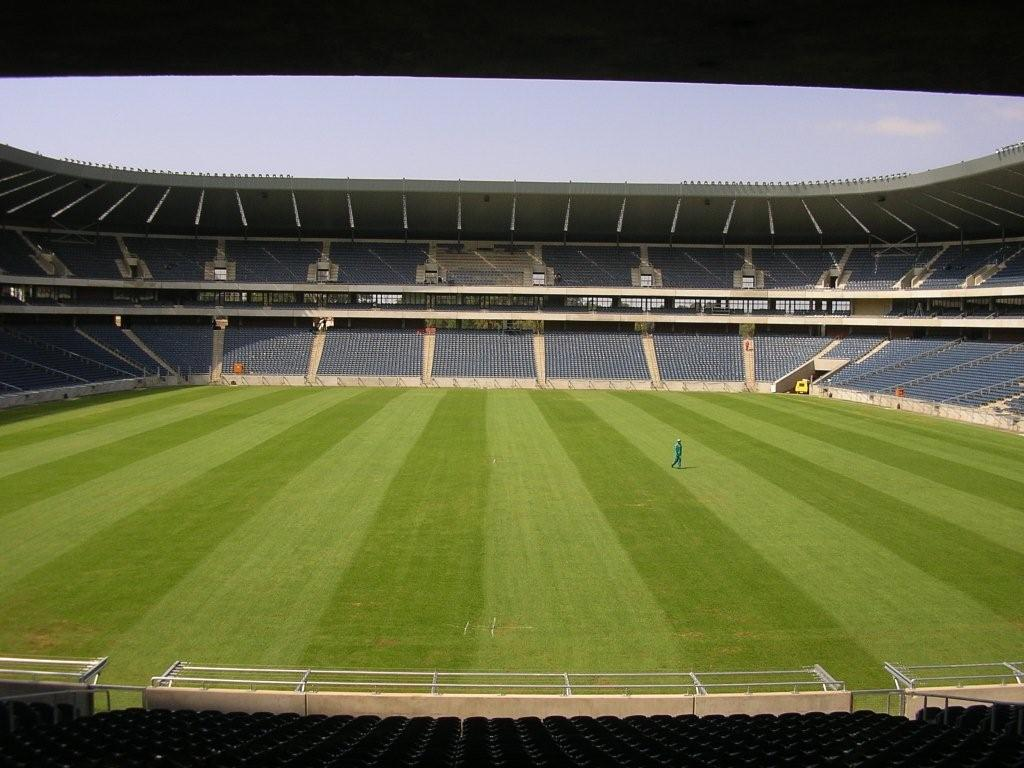
Orlando Stadium in Johannesburg, South Africa hosted the first leg.

Orlando Stadium is a multi-purpose stadium, in Soweto, a suburb of Johannesburg, in Gauteng province in South Africa. It is home venue for Orlando Pirates Football Club.

It is currently used mostly for football matches, as the home stadium of Orlando Pirates FC of the Premier Soccer League, and was intended to be utilized, as a training field, for teams participating in the 2010 FIFA World Cup after it was completely rebuilt and reopened on 22 November 2008. In addition to the stadium capacity of 36,761 people, there is an auditorium for 200 people, 120 hospitality suites, a gymnasium and a conference centre.

The stadium was originally built for the Johannesburg Bantu Football Association and it had a seating capacity of 24,000 and cost £37,500 to construct. It was opened by the Minister for Bantu development, MC de Wet Nel, and Ian Maltz who was then Mayor of Johannesburg on 2 May 1959.

Although intended for football the stadium has been used for concerts by the Jazz musicians Molombo and by the O'Jays. Boxing matches were also staged including the 1975 victory of Elijah ‘Tap Tap' Makhathini over the world welterweight and middleweight champion Emile Griffith.

=== Osman Ahmed Osman Stadium ===
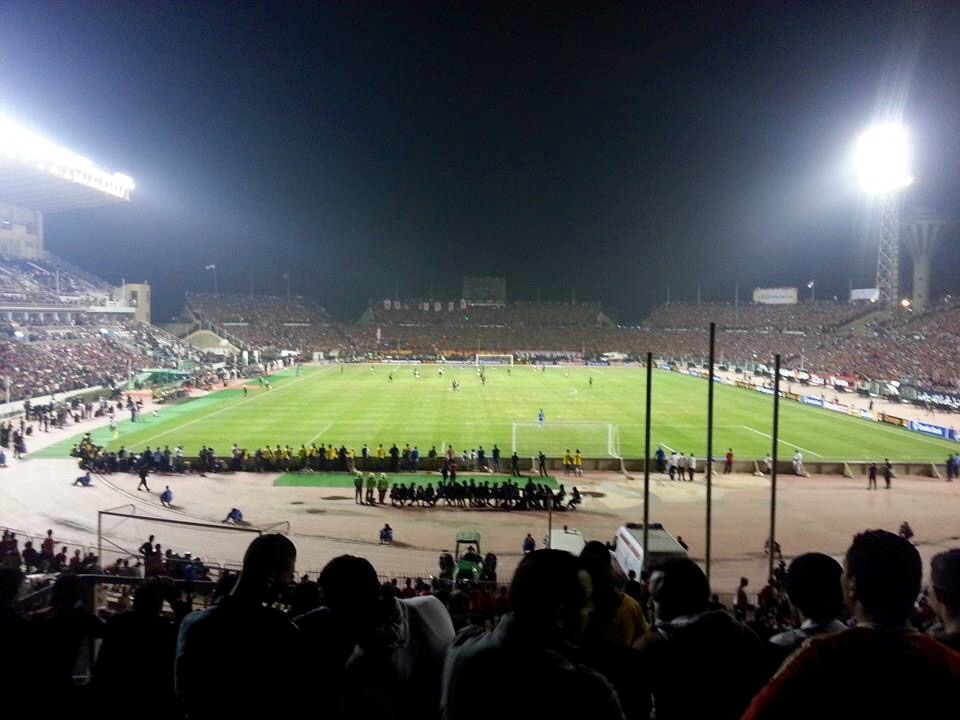
Osman Ahmed Osman Stadium in Cairo, Egypt hosted the second leg.

Osman Ahmed Osman Stadium, also known as the Arab Contractors Stadium or Al Mokawloon Al Arab Stadium, is a multi-use stadium in Cairo, Egypt. It is currently used mostly for football matches. It is the home stadium of Al Mokawloon Al Arab.

The stadium has a capacity of 35,000 spectators.

In fact, Al Ahly’s management decided to play the match in this stadium because the El Gouna Stadium in which it played its previous matches was not eligible to host the Champions League final, in addition to the Egyptian authorities ’decision not to play the game in the Cairo International Stadium due to the Port Said Stadium riot.

== Road to final ==
Note: In all results below, the score of the finalist is given first.

(South Africa) Orlando Pirates				Round	(Egypt) Al-Ahly			
Opponent	Agg.	1st leg	2nd leg	Qualifying rounds	Opponent	Agg.	1st leg	2nd leg
(Comoros) Djabal Club	9–0	5–0 (H)	4–0 (A)	Preliminary round	Bye			
(Zambia) Zanaco	3–1	1–0 (A)	2–1 (H)	First round	(Kenya) Tusker	4–1	2–1 (A)	2–0 (H)
(Democratic Republic of the Congo) TP Mazembe	3–2	3–1 (H)	0–1 (A)	Second round	(Tunisia) CA Bizertin	2–1	0–0 (A)	2–1 (H)
Opponent	Result			Group stage	Opponent	Result		
(Republic of the Congo) AC Léopards	0–0 (H)			Matchday 1	(Egypt) Zamalek	1–1 (A)		
(Egypt) Al-Ahly	3–0 (A)			Matchday 2	(South Africa) Orlando Pirates	0–3 (H)		
(Egypt) Zamalek	4–1 (H)			Matchday 3	(Republic of the Congo) AC Léopards	1–0 (A)		
(Egypt) Zamalek	1–2 (A)			Matchday 4	(Republic of the Congo) AC Léopards	2–1 (H)		
(Republic of the Congo) AC Léopards	0–1 (A)			Matchday 5	(Egypt) Zamalek	4–2 (H)		
(Egypt) Al-Ahly	0–0 (H)			Matchday 6	(South Africa) Orlando Pirates	0–0 (A)		
**Group A runner-up**: Pos / Team / Pld / W / D / L / GF / GA / GD / Pts / Qualification; 1 / (Egypt) Al-Ahly / 6 / 3 / 2 / 1 / 8 / 7 / +1 / **11** / **Advance to knockout stage**; **2** / (South Africa) Orlando Pirates / **6** / **2** / **2** / **2** / **8** / **4** / **+4** / **8** / **Advance to knockout stage**; 3 / (Egypt) Zamalek / 6 / 2 / 1 / 3 / 10 / 12 / −2 / **7**; 4 / (Republic of the Congo) AC Léopards / 6 / 2 / 1 / 3 / 4 / 7 / −3 / **7**; Source: CAF				Final standings	**Group A winner**: Pos / Team / Pld / W / D / L / GF / GA / GD / Pts / Qualification; **1** / (Egypt) Al-Ahly / **6** / **3** / **2** / **1** / **8** / **7** / **+1** / **11** / **Advance to knockout stage**; 2 / (South Africa) Orlando Pirates / 6 / 2 / 2 / 2 / 8 / 4 / +4 / **8** / **Advance to knockout stage**; 3 / (Egypt) Zamalek / 6 / 2 / 1 / 3 / 10 / 12 / −2 / **7**; 4 / (Republic of the Congo) AC Léopards / 6 / 2 / 1 / 3 / 4 / 7 / −3 / **7**; Source: CAF			
Opponent	Agg.	1st leg	2nd leg	Knock-out stage	Opponent	Agg.	1st leg	2nd leg
(Tunisia) ES Tunis	1–1 (a)	0–0 (H)	1–1 (A)	Semifinals	(Cameroon) Coton Sport	2–2 (7–6p)	1–1 (A)	1–1 (H)

== Format ==
The final was played on a home-and-away two-legged basis. If the sides were level on aggregate after the second leg, the away goals rule was applied, and if still level, the tie proceeded directly to a penalty shoot-out (no extra time was played).

== Matches ==
=== First leg ===
2 November 2013
20:30 UTC+2

Orlando Pirates (South Africa)	1–1	(Egypt) Al-Ahly
Matlaba 90+3'	Report	Aboutrika 14'

Orlando Stadium, Johannesburg
Attendance: 40,000
Referee: Djamel Haimoudi (Algeria)

**Orlando Pirates**	**Al-Ahly**

GK	1	(South Africa) Senzo Meyiwa
DF	2	(South Africa) Ayanda Gcaba
DF	4	(South Africa) Happy Jele (c)	(yellow card) ?'
DF	8	(South Africa) Thabo Matlaba
DF	28	(South Africa) Rooi Mahamutsa
MF	20	(South Africa) Oupa Manyisa
MF	23	(South Africa) Tlou Segolela
MF	7	(South Africa) Daine Klate
MF	11	(South Africa) Sifiso Myeni		(substituted off) 76'
MF	15	(South Africa) Andile Jali	(yellow card) 90+2'
FW	17	(South Africa) Lennox Bacela		(substituted off) 82'
Substitutes:
MF	27	(South Africa) Mpho Makola		(substituted on) 76'
FW	19	(Zambia) Collins Mbesuma		(substituted on) 82'
MF	12	(South Africa) Lehlogonolo Masalesa
DF	14	(South Africa) Lucky Lekgwathi
GK	16	(South Africa) Brighton Mhlongo
MF	24	(South Africa) Khetokwakhe Masuku
DF	19	(South Africa) Bheki Nzunga
Manager:
(South Africa) Roger De Sá

GK	1	(Egypt) Sherif Ekramy
DF	24	(Egypt) Ahmed Fathy
DF	6	(Egypt) Wael Gomaa (c)
DF	17	(Egypt) Sayed Moawad	(yellow card) 68'
DF	4	(Egypt) Sherif Abdel-Fadil
DF	23	(Egypt) Mohamed Nagieb
MF	25	(Egypt) Hossam Ashour
MF	19	(Egypt) Abdallah El-Said		(substituted off) 90'
MF	11	(Egypt) Walid Soliman
MF	22	(Egypt) Mohamed Aboutrika		(substituted off) 81'
FW	21	(Egypt) Ahmed Abd El-Zaher		(substituted off) 65'
Substitutes:
FW	26	(Mauritania) Dominique Da Silva		(substituted on) 65'
DF	37	(Egypt) Ramy Rabia		(substituted on) 81'
DF	12	(Egypt) Ahmad Shedid Qinawi		(substituted on) 90'
DF	2	(Egypt) Saad Samir
FW	9	(Egypt) Emad Moteab
GK	13	(Egypt) Ahmed Adel Abd El-Moneam
MF	27	(Egypt) Trezeguet
Manager:
(Egypt) Mohamed Youssef

Assistant referees:
Redouane Achik (Morocco)
Abdelhak Etchiali (Algeria)
Fourth official:
Mohamed Benouza (Algeria)

=== Second leg ===
10 November 2013
18:00 UTC+2

Al-Ahly (Egypt)	2–0	(South Africa) Orlando Pirates
Aboutrika 54'; Abd El-Zaher 78'	Report

Osman Ahmed Osman Stadium, Cairo
Attendance: 35,000
Referee: Bakary Gassama (Gambia)

**Al-Ahly**	**Orlando Pirates**

GK	1	(Egypt) Sherif Ekramy
DF	24	(Egypt) Ahmed Fathy
DF	6	(Egypt) Wael Gomaa (c)
DF	17	(Egypt) Sayed Moawad
DF	4	(Egypt) Sherif Abdel-Fadil	(yellow card) 31' (yellow-red card) 83'
DF	23	(Egypt) Mohamed Nagieb
MF	25	(Egypt) Hossam Ashour
MF	19	(Egypt) Abdallah El-Said
MF	11	(Egypt) Walid Soliman		(substituted off) 73'
MF	22	(Egypt) Mohamed Aboutrika		(substituted off) 90+2'
FW	21	(Egypt) Ahmed Abd El-Zaher		(substituted off) 86'
Substitutes:
DF	12	(Egypt) Ahmad Shedid Qinawi		(substituted on) 73'
DF	37	(Egypt) Ramy Rabia		(substituted on) 86'
FW	9	(Egypt) Emad Moteab		(substituted on) 90+2'
GK	16	(Egypt) Mahmoud Abou El-Saoud
FW	26	(Mauritania) Dominique Da Silva
MF	27	(Egypt) Trezeguet
DF	30	(Egypt) Shehab El-Din Ahmed
Manager:
(Egypt) Mohamed Youssef

GK	1	(South Africa) Senzo Meyiwa
DF	28	(South Africa) Rooi Mahamutsa
DF	14	(South Africa) Lucky Lekgwathi (c)
DF	2	(South Africa) Ayanda Gcaba
DF	8	(South Africa) Thabo Matlaba
MF	20	(South Africa) Oupa Manyisa
MF	23	(South Africa) Tlou Segolela	(substituted off) 75'
MF	7	(South Africa) Daine Klate	(substituted off) 86'
MF	11	(South Africa) Sifiso Myeni
MF	12	(South Africa) Lehlogonolo Masalesa
FW	17	(South Africa) Lennox Bacela
Substitutes:
FW	19	(Zambia) Collins Mbesuma	(substituted on) 75'
MF	27	(South Africa) Mpho Makola	(substituted on) 86'
MF	6	(South Africa) Thandani Ntshumayelo	(substituted on) 90+4'
GK	16	(South Africa) Brighton Mhlongo
FW	26	(South Africa) Ndumiso Mabena
MF	24	(South Africa) Khetokwakhe Masuku
DF	19	(South Africa) Bheki Nzunga
Manager:
(South Africa) Roger De Sá

Assistant referees:
Angesom Ogbamariam (Eritrea)
Félicien Kabanda (Rwanda)
Fourth official:
Maudo Jallow (Gambia)
