= 2013 CAF Champions League group stage =

- Dates: 20 July – 22 September 2013

Tournament statistics
- Matches played: 24
- Goals scored: 57 (2.38 per match)

The group stage of the 2013 CAF Champions League was played from 20 July to 22 September 2013. A total of eight teams competed in the group stage.

== Draw ==
The draw for the group stage was held on 14 May 2013, 14:00 UTC+2, at the CAF Headquarters in Cairo, Egypt. The eight winners of the second round were drawn into two groups of four. Each group contained one team from Pot 1, one team from Pot 2, and two teams from Pot 3.

The following eight teams were entered into the draw:

Pot 1

- (Tunisia) Espérance de Tunis
- (Egypt) Al-Ahly

Pot 2

- (Republic of the Congo) AC Léopards
- (Cameroon) Coton Sport

Pot 3

- (Egypt) Zamalek
- (Ivory Coast) Séwé Sport
- (South Africa) Orlando Pirates
- (Angola) Recreativo do Libolo

== Format ==
In the group stage, each group was played on a home-and-away round-robin basis. The winners and runners-up of each group advanced to the semi-finals.

=== Tiebreakers ===
The teams are ranked according to points (3 points for a win, 1 point for a tie, 0 points for a loss). If tied on points, tiebreakers are applied in the following order:

1. Number of points obtained in games between the teams concerned
2. Goal difference in games between the teams concerned
3. Away goals scored in games between the teams concerned
4. Goal difference in all games
5. Goals scored in all games.

== Groups ==
The matchdays were 19–21 July, 2–4 August, 16–18 August, 30 August–1 September, 13–15 September, and 20–22 September 2013.

=== Group A ===
Pos	Team	Pld	W	D	L	GF	GA	GD	Pts	Qualification
1	(Egypt) Al-Ahly	6	3	2	1	8	7	+1	11	Advance to knockout stage
2	(South Africa) Orlando Pirates	6	2	2	2	8	4	+4	8	Advance to knockout stage
3	(Egypt) Zamalek	6	2	1	3	10	12	−2	7 (Note: Zamalek are ranked ahead of AC Léopards on head-to-head record).)	
4	(Republic of the Congo) AC Léopards	6	2	1	3	4	7	−3	7	

Source: CAF
Notes:

Tiebreaker
Team	Pld	W	D	L	GF	GA	GD	AG	Pts
(Egypt) Zamalek	2	1	0	1	4	2	+2		3
(Republic of the Congo) AC Léopards	2	1	0	1	2	4	−2		3

Source: CAF
20 July 2013
20:00 UTC+2

Orlando Pirates (South Africa)	0–0	(Republic of the Congo) AC Léopards
	Report

Orlando Stadium, Johannesburg
Referee: Rajindraparsad Seechurn (Mauritius)
24 July 2013
16:30 UTC+2

Zamalek (Egypt)	1–1	(Egypt) Al-Ahly
Gaafar 8'	Report	Aboutrika 54' (pen.)

El Gouna Stadium, El Gouna
Attendance: 8,000
Referee: Djamel Haimoudi (Algeria)

Note: The Zamalek v Al-Ahly match was postponed due to security concerns in Egypt.

4 August 2013
15:30 UTC+1

AC Léopards (Republic of the Congo)	1–0	(Egypt) Zamalek
Ntela 37' (pen.)	Report

Stade Denis Sassou Nguesso, Dolisie
Referee: Hamada Nampiandraza (Madagascar)
4 August 2013
16:30 UTC+2

Al-Ahly (Egypt)	0–3	(South Africa) Orlando Pirates
	Report	Ntshumayelo 12'; Jali 73' (pen.); Myeni 76'

El Gouna Stadium, El Gouna
Referee: Mohamed Benouza (Algeria)

17 August 2013
14:30 UTC+1

AC Léopards (Republic of the Congo)	0–1	(Egypt) Al-Ahly
	Report	Soliman 41'

Stade Denis Sassou Nguesso, Dolisie
Referee: Bernard Camille (Seychelles)
17 August 2013
20:00 UTC+2

Orlando Pirates (South Africa)	4–1	(Egypt) Zamalek
Bacela 27'; Segolela 52'; Myeni 74'; Klate 82'	Report	Shikabala 29'

Orlando Stadium, Johannesburg
Referee: Slim Jedidi (Tunisia)

31 August 2013
16:00 UTC+2

Al-Ahly (Egypt)	2–1	(Republic of the Congo) AC Léopards
El-Said 37'; Soliman 68'	Report	Beaullia 84'

El Gouna Stadium, El Gouna
Attendance: 6,000
Referee: Badara Diatta (Senegal)
1 September 2013
16:00 UTC+2

Zamalek (Egypt)	2–1	(South Africa) Orlando Pirates
Abdel Malek 6' (pen.); Soliman 51'	Report	Bacela 33'

El Gouna Stadium, El Gouna
Referee: Noumandiez Doué (Ivory Coast)

14 September 2013
14:30 UTC+1

AC Léopards (Republic of the Congo)	1–0	(South Africa) Orlando Pirates
Bissiki 72'	Report

Stade Denis Sassou Nguesso, Dolisie
Referee: Mohamed Said Kordi (Tunisia)
15 September 2013
15:00 UTC+2

Al-Ahly (Egypt)	4–2	(Egypt) Zamalek
Soliman 9'; Abd El-Zaher 15'; Aboutrika 52'; Ahmed Fathy 71'	Report	Gaber 4'; Hassan 82'

El Gouna Stadium, El Gouna
Referee: Néant Alioum (Cameroon)

22 September 2013
15:00 UTC+2

Zamalek (Egypt)	4–1	(Republic of the Congo) AC Léopards
Ibrahim 33'; Shikabala 45+1'; Gaafar 57', 65'	Report	Bhebey Ndey 26'

El Gouna Stadium, El Gouna
Referee: Ousmane Fall (Senegal)
22 September 2013
15:00 UTC+2

Orlando Pirates (South Africa)	0–0	(Egypt) Al-Ahly
	Report

Orlando Stadium, Johannesburg
Referee: Koman Coulibaly (Mali)

=== Group B ===
Pos	Team	Pld	W	D	L	GF	GA	GD	Pts	Qualification
1	(Tunisia) Espérance de Tunis	6	5	0	1	9	4	+5	15	Advance to knockout stage
2	(Cameroon) Coton Sport	6	2	2	2	5	6	−1	8	Advance to knockout stage
3	(Ivory Coast) Séwé Sport	6	1	2	3	5	6	−1	5 (Note: Séwé Sport are ranked ahead of Recreativo do Libolo on head-to-head record.)	
4	(Angola) Recreativo do Libolo	6	1	2	3	8	11	−3	5	

Updated to match(es) played on unknown. Source: CAF
Notes:

Head-to-head
Team	Pld	W	D	L	GF	GA	GD	Pts
(Ivory Coast) Séwé Sport	2	1	1	0	5	3	+2	4
(Angola) Recreativo do Libolo	2	0	1	1	3	5	−2	1

21 July 2013
15:30 UTC+1

Recreativo do Libolo (Angola)	1–0	(Tunisia) Espérance de Tunis
Aguinaldo 90+4'	Report

Estádio Municipal de Calulo, Calulo
Referee: Janny Sikazwe (Zambia)

3 August 2013
15:30 UTC±0

Séwé Sport (Ivory Coast)	3–1	(Angola) Recreativo do Libolo
Zougoula 24', 39', 45+4' (pen.)	Report	Sidnei 34'

Stade Robert Champroux, Abidjan
Referee: Bouchaïb El Ahrach (Morocco)
3 August 2013
22:00 UTC+1

Espérance de Tunis (Tunisia)	2–0	(Cameroon) Coton Sport
Belaïli 61'; Msakni 90+1'	Report

Stade Olympique de Radès, Tunis
Referee: Gehad Grisha (Egypt)

11 August 2013
15:00 UTC+1

Coton Sport (Cameroon)	1–0	(Ivory Coast) Séwé Sport
Yougouda 58'	Report

Roumdé Adjia Stadium, Garoua
Referee: Eric Otogo-Castane (Gabon)

Note: The Coton Sport v Séwé Sport match of Matchday 1 was postponed due to FIFA's suspension on 4 July 2013 of the Cameroonian Football Federation, which was lifted on 22 July 2013.

18 August 2013
14:30 UTC+1

Coton Sport (Cameroon)	2–1	(Angola) Recreativo do Libolo
Yougouda 31'; Mbongo 47'	Report	Rúben Gouveia 89'

Roumdé Adjia Stadium, Garoua
Referee: Tessema Bamlak (Ethiopia)
18 August 2013
15:30 UTC±0

Séwé Sport (Ivory Coast)	0–1	(Tunisia) Espérance de Tunis
	Report	Darragi 48'

Stade Robert Champroux, Abidjan
Referee: Ousmane Fall (Senegal)

31 August 2013
20:00 UTC+1

Espérance de Tunis (Tunisia)	1–0	(Ivory Coast) Séwé Sport
Yahia 58'	Report

Stade Olympique de Radès, Tunis
Referee: Djamel Haimoudi (Algeria)
1 September 2013
14:30 UTC+1

Recreativo do Libolo (Angola)	1–1	(Cameroon) Coton Sport
Aguinaldo 24'	Report	Yedan 32'

Estádio Municipal de Calulo, Calulo
Referee: Bakary Gassama (Gambia)

14 September 2013
20:00 UTC+1

Espérance de Tunis (Tunisia)	3–2	(Angola) Recreativo do Libolo
N'Djeng 2', 80'; Darragi 53'	Report	Rúben Gouveia 46', 55'

Stade Olympique de Radès, Tunis
Referee: Daniel Bennett (South Africa)
15 September 2013
15:00 UTC±0

Séwé Sport (Ivory Coast)	0–0	(Cameroon) Coton Sport
	Report

Stade Robert Champroux, Abidjan
Referee: Joshua Bondo (Botswana)

21 September 2013
15:00 UTC+1

Recreativo do Libolo (Angola)	2–2	(Ivory Coast) Séwé Sport
João Tomás 4'; Nuno Silva 11' (pen.)	Report	Halidou 8'; Binaté 41'

Estádio Municipal de Calulo, Calulo
Referee: Mohamed Benouza (Algeria)
21 September 2013
15:00 UTC+1

Coton Sport (Cameroon)	1–2	(Tunisia) Espérance de Tunis
Kamilou 90+1'	Report	Gharsellaoui 7'; Akaïchi 24'

Roumdé Adjia Stadium, Garoua
Referee: Hamada Nampiandraza (Madagascar)
