= 2013 CAF Champions League knockout stage =

Football tournament knockout stage

The knock-out stage of the 2013 CAF Champions League was played from 5 October to 10 November 2013. A total of four teams competed in the knock-out stage.

== Qualified teams ==
The winners and runners-up of each of the two groups in the group stage qualified for the knock-out stage.

Group	Winners	Runners-up
A	(Egypt) Al-Ahly	(South Africa) Orlando Pirates
B	(Tunisia) Espérance de Tunis	(Cameroon) Coton Sport

== Format ==
Knock-out ties were played on a home-and-away two-legged basis. If the sides were level on aggregate after the second leg, the away goals rule was applied, and if still level, the tie proceeded directly to a penalty shoot-out (no extra time was played).

== Schedule ==
The schedule of each round was as follows.

Round	First leg	Second leg
Semi-finals	4–6 October 2013	18–20 October 2013
Final	1–3 November 2013	8–10 November 2013

== Semi-finals ==
In the semi-finals, the group A winners played the group B runners-up, and the group B winners played the group A runners-up, with the group winners hosting the second leg.

Team 1	Agg.	Team 2	1st leg	2nd leg
Coton Sport (Cameroon)	2–2 (6–7 p)	(Egypt) Al-Ahly	1–1	1–1
Orlando Pirates (South Africa)	1–1 (a)	(Tunisia) Espérance de Tunis	0–0	1–1

6 October 2013
15:00 UTC+1

Coton Sport (Cameroon)	1–1	(Egypt) Al-Ahly
Mbongo 33'	Report	Aboutrika 45+3'

Roumdé Adjia Stadium, Garoua
Referee: Janny Sikazwe (Zambia)

Note: The first leg was originally played on 5 October 2013, 15:00 UTC+1, but was abandoned with the score 0–0 in the 65th minute due to a waterlogged pitch. The match was replayed the next day in its entirety according to the competition regulations.

20 October 2013
14:30 UTC+2

Al-Ahly (Egypt)	1–1	(Cameroon) Coton Sport
El-Said 3'	Report	Yougouda 65'
Penalties
Aboutrika (penalty missed); Soliman (penalty scored); Gomaa (penalty scored); Shehab (penalty scored); Moawad (penalty scored); Trzeguet (penalty scored); Nagieb (penalty scored); Fathy (penalty scored)	7–6	(penalty scored) Oyongo; (penalty scored) Bouba; (penalty missed) Yougouda; (penalty scored) Manga Mbah; (penalty scored) Kingue Mpondo; (penalty scored) Ngamaleu; (penalty scored) Zimbori; (penalty missed) Haman

El Gouna Stadium, El Gouna
Attendance: 0
Referee: Rajindraparsad Seechurn (Mauritius)

2–2 on aggregate. Al-Ahly won the penalty shoot-out and advanced to the final.

5 October 2013
18:00 UTC+2

Orlando Pirates (South Africa)	0–0	(Tunisia) Espérance de Tunis
	Report

Orlando Stadium, Johannesburg
Referee: Bouchaïb El Ahrach (Morocco)
19 October 2013
19:00 UTC+1

Espérance de Tunis (Tunisia)	1–1	(South Africa) Orlando Pirates
Msakni 55'	Report	Mahamutsa 52'

Stade Olympique de Radès, Tunis
Referee: Eric Otogo-Castane (Gabon)

1–1 on aggregate. Orlando Pirates won on the away goals rule and advanced to the final.

== Final ==
In the final, the order of legs was decided by a draw. The draw was held on 14 May 2013, 14:00 UTC+2, at the CAF Headquarters in Cairo, Egypt.

Team 1	Agg.	Team 2	1st leg	2nd leg
Orlando Pirates (South Africa)	1–3	(Egypt) Al-Ahly	1–1	0–2

2 November 2013
20:30 UTC+2

Orlando Pirates (South Africa)	1–1	(Egypt) Al-Ahly
Matlaba 90+3'	Report	Aboutrika 14'

Orlando Stadium, Johannesburg
Referee: Djamel Haimoudi (Algeria)
10 November 2013
18:00 UTC+2

Al-Ahly (Egypt)	2–0	(South Africa) Orlando Pirates
Aboutrika 54'; Abd El-Zaher 78'	Report

Osman Ahmed Osman Stadium, Cairo
Referee: Bakary Gassama (Gambia)

Al-Ahly won 3–1 on aggregate.
