= 2013 CAF Champions League =

2013 Orange CAF Champions League

Tournament details
- Dates: 15 February – 10 November 2013
- Teams: 56 (from 45 associations)

Final positions
- Champions: (Egypt) Al-Ahly (8th title)
- Runners-up: (South Africa) Orlando Pirates

Tournament statistics
- Matches played: 124
- Goals scored: 288 (2.32 per match)
- Top scorer(s): (Cameroon) Alexis Yougouda Kada (7 goals)

The 2013 CAF Champions League (also known as the 2013 Orange CAF Champions League for sponsorship reasons) was the 49th edition of Africa's premier club football tournament organized by the Confederation of African Football (CAF), and the 17th edition under the current CAF Champions League format. The winner qualified for the 2013 FIFA Club World Cup, and earned the right to play in the 2014 CAF Super Cup.

In the final, defending champions Al-Ahly of Egypt defeated Orlando Pirates of South Africa, and were crowned African club champions for a record-extending eighth time.

== Association team allocation ==
All 56 CAF member associations may enter the CAF Champions League, with the 12 highest ranked associations according to their CAF 5-year ranking eligible to enter two teams in the competition. The title holders could also enter if they had not already qualified for the CAF Champions League. As a result, theoretically a maximum of 69 teams could enter the tournament – although this level has never been reached.

For the 2013 CAF Champions League, the CAF used the 2007–2011 CAF 5-year ranking, which calculated points for each association based on their clubs’ performance over those 5 years in the CAF Champions League and CAF Confederation Cup. The criteria for points were the following:

	CAF Champions League	CAF Confederation Cup
Winner	5 points	4 points
Runner-up	4 points	3 points
Losing semi-finalists	3 points	2 points
3rd place in groups	2 points	1 point
4th place in groups	1 point	1 point

The points were multiplied by a coefficient according to the year as follows:

- 2011 – 5
- 2010 – 4
- 2009 – 3
- 2008 – 2
- 2007 – 1

== Teams ==
The following teams entered the competition. Teams in bold received a bye to the first round. The other teams entered the preliminary round.

Associations are shown according to their 2007–2011 CAF 5-year ranking – those with a ranking score have their rank and score indicated.

Association	Team	Qualifying method
Associations eligible to enter two teams (Ranked 1–12)
Tunisia (1st – 100 pts)	**Espérance de Tunis**	2011–12 Tunisian Ligue Professionnelle 1 champion
Tunisia (1st – 100 pts)	CA Bizertin	2011–12 Tunisian Ligue Professionnelle 1 runner-up
Nigeria (2nd – 70 pts)	Kano Pillars	2012 Nigeria Premier League champion
Nigeria (2nd – 70 pts)	Enugu Rangers	2012 Nigeria Premier League runner-up
Egypt (3rd – 64 pts)	**Al-Ahly**	Title holders (2012 CAF Champions League winner); 2010–11 Egyptian Premier League champion
Egypt (3rd – 64 pts)	Zamalek	2010–11 Egyptian Premier League runner-up
Morocco (4th – 62 pts)	Moghreb Tétouan	2011–12 Botola champion
Morocco (4th – 62 pts)	FUS Rabat	2011–12 Botola runner-up
(Democratic Republic of the Congo) Congo DR (5th – 49 pts)	**TP Mazembe**	2012 Linafoot champion
(Democratic Republic of the Congo) Congo DR (5th – 49 pts)	AS Vita Club	2012 Linafoot runner-up
Sudan (6th – 47 pts)	**Al-Hilal**	2012 Sudan Premier League champion
Sudan (6th – 47 pts)	**Al-Merrikh**	2012 Sudan Premier League runner-up
Algeria (7th – 43 pts)	**ES Sétif**	2011–12 Algerian Ligue Professionnelle 1 champion
Algeria (7th – 43 pts)	JSM Béjaïa	2011–12 Algerian Ligue Professionnelle 1 runner-up
Cameroon (8th – 19 pts)	Union Douala	2012 Cameroonian Premier League champion
Cameroon (8th – 19 pts)	Coton Sport	2012 Cameroonian Premier League runner-up
Angola (9th – 18 pts)	Recreativo do Libolo	2012 Girabola champion
Angola (9th – 18 pts)	Primeiro de Agosto	2012 Girabola runner-up
Mali (10th – 16 pts)	**Djoliba**	2011–12 Malian Première Division champion
Mali (10th – 16 pts)	**Stade Malien**	2011–12 Malian Première Division runner-up
Zimbabwe (11th – 13 pts)	Dynamos (one entrant only)	2012 Zimbabwe Premier Soccer League champion
Ivory Coast (T-12th – 11 pts)	Séwé Sport	2012 Côte d'Ivoire Premier Division champion
Ivory Coast (T-12th – 11 pts)	AFAD Djékanou	2012 Côte d'Ivoire Premier Division runner-up
Associations eligible to enter one team
Libya (T-12th – 11 pts)	Al-Ittihad	2009–10 Libyan Premier League champion
Zambia (14th – 10 pts)	Zanaco	2012 Zambian Premier League champion
Niger (15th – 4 pts)	Olympic Niamey	2011–12 Niger Premier League champion
Ghana (16th – 2 pts)	Asante Kotoko	2011–12 Ghanaian Premier League champion
South Africa (17th – 1 pt)	Orlando Pirates	2011–12 Premier Soccer League champion
Benin	ASPAC	2011–12 Benin Premier League champion
Botswana	Mochudi Centre Chiefs	2011–12 Botswana Premier League champion
Burkina Faso	ASFA Yennenga	2012 Burkinabé Premier League champion
Burundi	Vital'O	2011–12 Burundi Premier League champion
Central African Republic	Olympic Real de Bangui	2012 Central African Republic League champion
Chad	Gazelle	2012 Ligue de N'Djaména champion
Comoros	Djabal Club	2012 Comoros Premier League champion
(Republic of the Congo) Congo	AC Léopards	2012 Congo Premier League champion
Equatorial Guinea	Sony Elá Nguema	2012 Equatoguinean Premier League champion
Ethiopia	Saint George	2011–12 Ethiopian Premier League champion
Gabon	CF Mounana	2011–12 Gabon Championnat National D1 champion
(The Gambia) Gambia	Real de Banjul	2012 GFA League First Division champion
Guinea	Horoya	2011–12 Guinée Championnat National champion
Kenya	Tusker	2012 Kenyan Premier League champion
Lesotho	Lesotho Correctional Services	2011–12 Lesotho Premier League champion
Liberia	LISCR	2012 Liberian Premier League champion
Madagascar	AS Adema	2012 THB Champions League champion
Mozambique	Maxaquene	2012 Moçambola champion
Rwanda	APR	2011–12 Primus National Football League champion
São Tomé and Príncipe	Sporting Clube do Príncipe	2012 São Tomé and Príncipe Championship champion
Senegal	Casa Sports	2011–12 Senegal Premier League champion
Seychelles	St Michel United	2012 Seychelles First Division champion
Sierra Leone	Diamond Stars	2011–12 Sierra Leone National Premier League champion
(Eswatini) Swaziland	Mbabane Swallows	2011–12 Swazi Premier League champion
Tanzania	Simba	2011–12 Tanzanian Premier League champion
Togo	Dynamic Togolais	2011–12 Togolese Championnat National champion
Uganda	URA	2011–12 Ugandan Super League third place
Zanzibar	Jamhuri	2012 Zanzibar Premier League runner-up

Notes

1. Egypt (EGY): The 2011–12 Egyptian Premier League champion and runner-up would originally represent Egypt in this tournament, but due to its cancellation, the 2010–11 Egyptian Premier League champion and runner-up were selected to represent Egypt.
2. Libya (LBY): As there were no club football in Libya in 2012, the 2009–10 Libyan Premier League champion (last completed season) was selected to represent Libya.
3. Zimbabwe (ZIM): Highlanders, the 2012 Zimbabwe Premier Soccer League runner-up, could not represent Zimbabwe as they were subject of a three-year ban for withdrawing from the 2011 CAF Confederation Cup.

The following associations did not enter a team: Cape Verde, Djibouti, Eritrea, Guinea-Bissau, Malawi, Mauritania, Mauritius, Namibia, Réunion, Somalia, South Sudan.

== Schedule ==
The schedule of the competition was as follows (all draws held at CAF headquarters in Cairo, Egypt).

Phase	Round	Draw date	First leg	Second leg
Qualifying	Preliminary round	9 December 2012	15–17 February 2013	1–3 March 2013
Qualifying	First round	9 December 2012	15–17 March 2013	5–7 April 2013
Qualifying	Second round	9 December 2012	19–21 April 2013	3–5 May 2013
Group stage	Matchday 1	14 May 2013	19–21 July 2013	
Group stage	Matchday 2	14 May 2013	2–4 August 2013	
Group stage	Matchday 3	14 May 2013	16–18 August 2013	
Group stage	Matchday 4	14 May 2013	30 August–1 September 2013	
Group stage	Matchday 5	14 May 2013	13–15 September 2013	
Group stage	Matchday 6	14 May 2013	20–22 September 2013	
Knock-out stage	Semi-finals	14 May 2013	4–6 October 2013	18–20 October 2013
Knock-out stage	Final	14 May 2013	1–3 November 2013	8–10 November 2013

== Qualifying rounds ==
The draw for the preliminary, first and second qualifying rounds was held on 9 December 2012, and the fixtures were announced by the CAF on 10 December 2012.

Qualification ties were played on a home-and-away two-legged basis. If the sides were level on aggregate after the second leg, the away goals rule was applied, and if still level, the tie proceeded directly to a penalty shoot-out (no extra time was played).

=== Preliminary round ===
Team 1	Agg.	Team 2	1st leg	2nd leg
Zamalek (Egypt)	7–0	(Chad) Gazelle	7–0	0–0
AS Vita Club (Democratic Republic of the Congo)	5–1	(Togo) Dynamic Togolais	3–0	2–1
Jamhuri (Zanzibar)	0–8	(Ethiopia) Saint George	0–3	0–5
CA Bizertin (Tunisia)	2–1	(Libya) Al-Ittihad	1–1	1–0
Dynamos (Zimbabwe)	3–1	Lesotho Correctional Services	3–0	0–1
St Michel United (Seychelles)	1–7	(Kenya) Tusker	1–4	0–3
Zanaco (Zambia)	3–2	(Eswatini) Mbabane Swallows	3–2	0–0
Orlando Pirates (South Africa)	9–0	(Comoros) Djabal Club	5–0	4–0
Maxaquene (Mozambique)	0–2	(Botswana) Mochudi Centre Chiefs	0–1	0–1
APR (Rwanda)	2–2 (a)	(Burundi) Vital'O	1–2	1–0
Enugu Rangers (Nigeria)	w/o	(São Tomé and Príncipe) Sporting Clube do Príncipe	—	—
Simba (Tanzania)	0–5	(Angola) Recreativo do Libolo	0–1	0–4
JSM Béjaïa (Algeria)	3–0	(Niger) Olympic Niamey	3–0	0–0
Asante Kotoko (Ghana)	8–0	(Equatorial Guinea) Sony Elá Nguema	7–0	1–0
Primeiro de Agosto (Angola)	4–3	(Madagascar) AS Adema	4–2	0–1
FUS Rabat (Morocco)	2–2 (a)	(The Gambia) Real de Banjul	1–0	1–2
Union Douala (Cameroon)	3–1	(Liberia) LISCR	2–1	1–0
Horoya (Guinea)	0–3	(Ivory Coast) Séwé Sport	0–0	0–3
AFAD Djékanou (Ivory Coast)	6–2	(Sierra Leone) Diamond Stars	5–1	1–1
Coton Sport (Cameroon)	0–0 (4–3 p)	(Uganda) URA	0–0	0–0
Moghreb Tétouan (Morocco)	1–1 (1–3 p)	(Senegal) Casa Sports	1–0	0–1
Kano Pillars (Nigeria)	5–1	(Central African Republic) Olympic Real de Bangui	5–1	0–0
AC Léopards (Republic of the Congo)	2–1	(Gabon) CF Mounana	2–0	0–1
ASPAC (Benin)	2–2 (4–5 p)	(Burkina Faso) ASFA Yennenga	1–1	1–1

Notes

1. Enugu Rangers advanced to the first round after Sporting Clube do Príncipe failed to show up for the first leg.

=== First round ===
Team 1	Agg.	Team 2	1st leg	2nd leg
Zamalek (Egypt)	1–0	(Democratic Republic of the Congo) AS Vita Club	1–0	0–0
Saint George (Ethiopia)	3–1	(Mali) Djoliba	2–0	1–1
CA Bizertin (Tunisia)	3–1	(Zimbabwe) Dynamos	3–0	0–1
Tusker (Kenya)	1–4	(Egypt) Al-Ahly	1–2	0–2
Zanaco (Zambia)	1–3	(South Africa) Orlando Pirates	0–1	1–2
Mochudi Centre Chiefs (Botswana)	0–7	(Democratic Republic of the Congo) TP Mazembe	0–1	0–6
Vital'O (Burundi)	0–2	(Nigeria) Enugu Rangers	0–0	0–2
Recreativo do Libolo (Angola)	4–2	(Sudan) Al-Merrikh	2–1	2–1
JSM Béjaïa (Algeria)	1–1 (a)	(Ghana) Asante Kotoko	0–0	1–1
Primeiro de Agosto (Angola)	0–2	(Tunisia) Espérance de Tunis	0–1	0–1
FUS Rabat (Morocco)	3–1	(Cameroon) Union Douala	3–0	0–1
Séwé Sport (Ivory Coast)	5–4	(Sudan) Al-Hilal	4–1	1–3
AFAD Djékanou (Ivory Coast)	1–3	(Cameroon) Coton Sport	0–1	1–2
Casa Sports (Senegal)	1–4	(Mali) Stade Malien	1–2	0–2
Kano Pillars (Nigeria)	4–4 (a)	(Republic of the Congo) AC Léopards	4–1	0–3
ASFA Yennenga (Burkina Faso)	4–5	(Algeria) ES Sétif	2–1	2–4

=== Second round ===
Team 1	Agg.	Team 2	1st leg	2nd leg
Zamalek (Egypt)	3–3 (a)	(Ethiopia) Saint George	1–1	2–2
CA Bizertin (Tunisia)	1–2	(Egypt) Al-Ahly	0–0	1–2
Orlando Pirates (South Africa)	3–2	(Democratic Republic of the Congo) TP Mazembe	3–1	0–1
Enugu Rangers (Nigeria)	1–3	(Angola) Recreativo do Libolo	0–0	1–3
JSM Béjaïa (Algeria)	0–1	(Tunisia) Espérance de Tunis	0–0	0–1
FUS Rabat (Morocco)	1–1 (a)	(Ivory Coast) Séwé Sport	1–1	0–0
Coton Sport (Cameroon)	3–0	(Mali) Stade Malien	3–0	0–0
AC Léopards (Republic of the Congo)	4–4 (5–4 p)	(Algeria) ES Sétif	3–1	1–3

The losers of the second round entered the 2013 CAF Confederation Cup play-off round.

== Group stage ==
Location of teams of the 2013 CAF Champions League group stage.
Group A
Group B

The draw for the group stage was held on 14 May 2013. The eight teams were drawn into two groups of four. Each group was played on a home-and-away round-robin basis. The winners and runners-up of each group advanced to the semi-finals.

Tiebreakers
The teams are ranked according to points (3 points for a win, 1 point for a tie, 0 points for a loss). If tied on points, tiebreakers are applied in the following order:
1. Number of points obtained in games between the teams concerned
2. Goal difference in games between the teams concerned
3. Away goals scored in games between the teams concerned
4. Goal difference in all games
5. Goals scored in all games.

=== Group A ===
Pos	Team	Pld	W	D	L	GF	GA	GD	Pts	Qualification	AHL	ORL	ZAM	LEO
1	(Egypt) Al-Ahly	6	3	2	1	8	7	+1	11	Advance to knockout stage	—	0–3	4–2	2–1
2	(South Africa) Orlando Pirates	6	2	2	2	8	4	+4	8	Advance to knockout stage	0–0	—	4–1	0–0
3	(Egypt) Zamalek	6	2	1	3	10	12	−2	7 (Note: Zamalek are ranked ahead of AC Léopards on head-to-head record).)		1–1	2–1	—	4–1
4	(Republic of the Congo) AC Léopards	6	2	1	3	4	7	−3	7		0–1	1–0	1–0	—

Source: CAF

=== Group B ===
Pos	Team	Pld	W	D	L	GF	GA	GD	Pts	Qualification	EST	COT	SEW	LIB
1	(Tunisia) Espérance de Tunis	6	5	0	1	9	4	+5	15	Advance to knockout stage	—	2–0	1–0	3–2
2	(Cameroon) Coton Sport	6	2	2	2	5	6	−1	8	Advance to knockout stage	1–2	—	1–0	2–1
3	(Ivory Coast) Séwé Sport	6	1	2	3	5	6	−1	5 (Note: Séwé Sport are ranked ahead of Recreativo do Libolo on head-to-head record.)		0–1	0–0	—	3–1
4	(Angola) Recreativo do Libolo	6	1	2	3	8	11	−3	5		1–0	1–1	2–2	—

Updated to match(es) played on unknown. Source: CAF

== Knock-out stage ==
Knock-out ties were played on a home-and-away two-legged basis. If the sides were level on aggregate after the second leg, the away goals rule was applied, and if still level, the tie proceeded directly to a penalty shoot-out (no extra time was played).

=== Bracket ===
Semi-finals
1	(South Africa) Orlando Pirates (a)	0	1	1
4	(Tunisia) Espérance de Tunis	0	1	1
3	(Cameroon) Coton Sport	1	1	2 (6)
2	(Egypt) Al Ahly (p)	1	1	2 (7)

Final
(South Africa) Orlando Pirates	1	0	1
(Egypt) Al Ahly	1	2	3

=== Semi-finals ===
In the semi-finals, the group A winners played the group B runners-up, and the group B winners played the group A runners-up, with the group winners hosting the second leg.

Team 1	Agg.	Team 2	1st leg	2nd leg
Orlando Pirates (South Africa)	1–1 (a)	(Tunisia) Espérance de Tunis	0–0	1–1
Coton Sport (Cameroon)	2–2 (6–7 p)	(Egypt) Al-Ahly	1–1	1–1

=== Final ===
In the final, the order of legs was decided by a draw.

2 November 2013
20:30 UTC+2

Orlando Pirates (South Africa)	1–1	(Egypt) Al-Ahly
Matlaba 90+3'	Report	Aboutrika 14'

Orlando Stadium, Johannesburg
Attendance: 40,000
Referee: Djamel Haimoudi (Algeria)
10 November 2013
18:00 UTC+2

Al-Ahly (Egypt)	2–0	(South Africa) Orlando Pirates
Aboutrika 54'; Abd El-Zaher 78'	Report

Osman Ahmed Osman Stadium, Cairo
Attendance: 35,000
Referee: Bakary Gassama (Gambia)

== Top scorers ==
Rank	Player	Team	Goals
1	(Cameroon) Alexis Yougouda Kada	(Cameroon) Coton Sport	7
2	(Egypt) Ahmed Gaafar	(Egypt) Zamalek	6
2	(Ivory Coast) Mamadou Soro	(Ivory Coast) AFAD Djékanou	6
4	(Egypt) Mohamed Aboutrika	(Egypt) Al-Ahly	5
4	(Zimbabwe) Takesure Chinyama	(South Africa) Orlando Pirates	5
4	(Burkina Faso) Abdoulaye Cissé	(Egypt) Zamalek	5
4	(Ivory Coast) Kévin Zougoula	(Ivory Coast) Séwé Sport	5
8	(Republic of the Congo) Arouna Biné Dramé	(Republic of the Congo) AC Léopards	4
8	(Portugal) Rúben Gouveia	(Angola) Recreativo do Libolo	4
8	(Egypt) Emad Moteab	(Egypt) Al-Ahly	4

== See also ==
- 2013 CAF Confederation Cup
- 2013 FIFA Club World Cup
- 2014 CAF Super Cup
