= Lehlogonolo Masalesa =

South African footballer

Personal information
- Date of birth: 21 March 1992 (age 34)
- Place of birth: Mankweng, South Africa
- Height: 1.91 m (6 ft 3 in)
- Position: Defensive midfielder

Youth career
- –2009: ASYDA

Senior career*
Years	Team	Apps	(Gls)
2009–2010	Platinum Stars	1	(0)
2010–2012	Bidvest Wits	28	(0)
2012–2017	Orlando Pirates	24	(0)
2017	AEL	14	(0)
2017–2018	Platinum Stars	10	(0)
2018–2019	Black Leopards	14	(0)
2019–2020	Chippa United	7	(0)
2020–2022	Black Leopards	8	(0)

International career
- South Africa U20
2017	South Africa	3	(0)
- * Club domestic league appearances and goals as of 5 June 2021

Lehlogonolo Masalesa (born 21 March 1992 in Mankweng) is a South African footballer who last played for Black Leopards as a midfielder.

== Career ==
Masalesa started his top-flight career at Platinum Stars after coming through the Africa Sport Youth Development Academy. However, he only made one substitute appearance for Dikwena, prompting a move to Bidvest Wits, who he represented 28 times before signing a three-year deal with Orlando Pirates in September 2012. The ex-national Under-20 midfielder notably impressed when given game-time during Pirates' run to the CAF Champions League Final in 2013.

He was given the nickname "Vieira" by famous South African football commentator Baba Mthethwa due to the similarities he shares with the former French international footballer.
