= Maxime Sekamana =

Rwandan footballer

Personal information
- Date of birth: 23 December 1995 (age 30)
- Place of birth: Kicukiro, Rwanda
- Height: 1.68 m (5 ft 6 in)
- Position: Forward

Team information
- Current team: Rayon Sports

Senior career*
Years	Team	Apps	(Gls)
2012–2019	APR		
2019–	Rayon Sports		

International career
2013–2017	Rwanda	4	(0)
- * Club domestic league appearances and goals

Maxime Sekamana (born 23 December 1995) is a Rwandan football striker who currently plays for Rayon Sports.
