= Bilel Ben Messaoud =

Tunisian footballer

Personal information
- Date of birth: 8 August 1989 (age 37)
- Place of birth: La Marsa, Tunisia
- Height: 1.90 m (6 ft 3 in)
- Position: Midfielder

Senior career*
Years	Team	Apps	(Gls)
2008–2012	AS Marsa		
2012–2013	Étoile du Sahel		
2013–2017	AS Marsa		
2017–2018	US Ben Guerdane		

International career
2012	Tunisia	1	(0)
- * Club domestic league appearances and goals

Bilel Ben Messaoud (born 8 August 1989) is a retired Tunisian football midfielder. (Note: Bilel Ben Messaoud at WorldFootball.net) (Note: Bilel Ben Messaoud at National-Football-Teams.com)
