= Youssoupha Mbengué =

Senegalese footballer (born 1991)

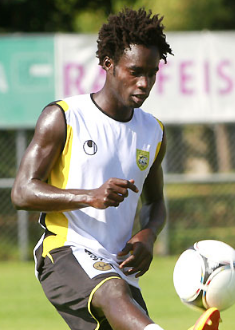
- Youssoupha Mbengue in a training session with CA Bizertin before a friendly match against Inter Milan in Locarno

Personal information
- Date of birth: 29 September 1991 (age 35)
- Place of birth: Ngor, Senegal
- Height: 1.80 m (5 ft 11 in)
- Position: Midfielder

Senior career*
| Years | Team | Apps | (Gls) |
| 2011–2017 | CA Bizertin | | |
| 2017–2018 | Al-Wakrah SC | | |
| 2018–2020 | CA Bizertin | | |
| 2020–2021 | Al-Kawkab | | |
- * Club domestic league appearances and goals

Youssoupha Mbengué (born 29 September 1991) is a Senegalese football midfielder who most recently played for Al-Kawkab.
