= Maunga Kabuku =

Zambian footballer (born 1985)

Personal information
- Date of birth: 6 June 1985 (age 41)
- Place of birth: Lusaka, Zambia
- Position: Midfielder

Senior career*
Years	Team	Apps	(Gls)
2003–2004	National Assembly		
2005	Zanaco		
2006–2012	Kabwe Warriors		
2013–2015	Zanaco		
2016–2017	NAPSA Stars		

International career
2008–2009	Zambia	5	(0)
- * Club domestic league appearances and goals

Maunga Kabuku (born 6 June 1985) is a retired Zambian football midfielder.
