= Fakhreddine Jaziri =

Tunisian footballer (born 1989)

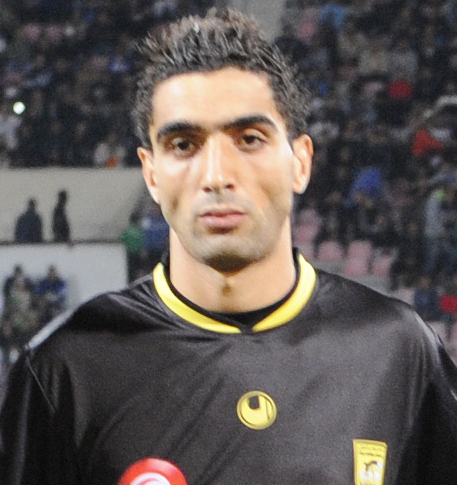

Personal information
- Full name: Fakhreddine Jaziri
- Date of birth: 25 January 1989 (age 37)
- Place of birth: Tunis, Tunisia
- Position: Midfielder

Team information
- Current team: Club Africain
- Number: 27

Senior career*
| Years | Team | Apps | (Gls) |
| 2008–2015 | CA Bizertin | | |
| 2015–2016 | EGS Gafsa | | |
| 2016– | Club Africain | | |
- * Club domestic league appearances and goals

Fakhreddine Jaziri (born 25 January 1989) is a Tunisian football midfielder who currently plays for Club Africain.
