= Marouane Troudi =

Tunisian footballer

Personal information
- Date of birth: 25 February 1990 (age 36)
- Position: Midfielder

Senior career*
Years	Team	Apps	(Gls)
2010–2013	JS Kairouan		
2013–2014	CA Bizertin		
2014	Étoile du Sahel		
2014–2015	US Monastir		
2015–2016	EGS Gafsa		
- * Club domestic league appearances and goals

Marouane Troudi (born 25 February 1990) is a retired Tunisian football midfielder.
