= Nuno Silva (footballer, born 1986) =

Portuguese footballer

Personal information
- Full name: Nuno Miguel Moreira Da Cunha Ribeiro e Silva
- Date of birth: 15 July 1986 (age 40)
- Place of birth: Matosinhos, Portugal
- Height: 1.78 m (5 ft 10 in)
- Position: Forward

Youth career
- 2004–2005: Maia

Senior career*
Years	Team	Apps	(Gls)
2005	Ermesinde		
2005–2007	Maia	22	(1)
2006–2007	→ Pedras Rubras (loan)	17	(13)
2007–2008	Sporting de Espinho	21	(7)
2008–2010	Freamunde	28	(3)
2010–2011	Tirsense	30	(10)
2011–2012	União da Madeira	22	(4)
2012	Olhanense	1	(0)
2013	Recreativo do Libolo	23	(1)
2014	Recreativo da Caála	9	(1)
2014–2015	Santa Clara	24	(2)
2015–2016	Real Jaén	29	(3)
2016–2018	Farense	29	(8)
2018	Sporting de Espinho	5	(0)
2018–2019	Fafe	25	(4)
- * Club domestic league appearances and goals

Nuno Miguel Moreira da Cunha Ribeiro e Silva (born 15 July 1986) is a Portuguese former professional footballer who played as a forward.

== Career ==
Silva made his professional debut in the Segunda Liga for Maia on 21 August 2005 in a game against Varzim.

He made his Primeira Liga debut for Olhanense on 23 September 2012 as a second-half substitute in a 1–0 loss against Vitória de Setúbal.
