= Tawanda Muparati =

Zimbabwean footballer (born 1983)

Personal information
- Date of birth: 10 September 1983 (age 43)
- Place of birth: Bulawayo, zimbabwe

Team information
- Current team: How Mine F.C.

Tawanda Muparati is a Zimbabwean professional footballer, who plays as a defender for How Mine F.C.

After injury hit season at Dynamos F.C. how left them, and join How Mine F.C.

== International career ==
In January 2014, coach Ian Gorowa, invited him to be a part of the Zimbabwe squad for the 2014 African Nations Championship. He helped the team to a fourth-place finish after being defeated by Nigeria by a goal to nil.
