= Nasiru Aliyu =

Nigerian footballer

Alli Nasiru
Personal information
- Full name: Abubakar Aliyu Nasiru
- Date of birth: October 20, 1990 (age 36)
- Place of birth: Offa, Nigeria
- Position: Midfielder

Team information
- Current team: Kwara United F.C.
- Number: 26

Youth career
- 2001–2002: El-Kanemi F.C.

Senior career*
Years	Team	Apps	(Gls)
2003–2004	El-Kanemi Warriors	31	(12)
2005–present	Kwara United F.C.	80	(22)
- * Club domestic league appearances and goals

Abubakar Aliyu Nasiru (born October 20, 1990) is a Nigerian football player currently with Kwara United F.C. of Ilorin.

== Early life ==
Hails from Sepi in Giyede local government area of Bauchi State, nurtures the ambition to become a successful professional football player.

== Career ==
Nasiru started his professional football career with El-Kanemi F.C. of Maiduguri in the 2003 season, before joined Kwara United F.C. of Ilorin through the transfer window 2005. A cadet of the Shell Cup 2004.
