= Mohamed Mhadhebi =

Tunisian footballer

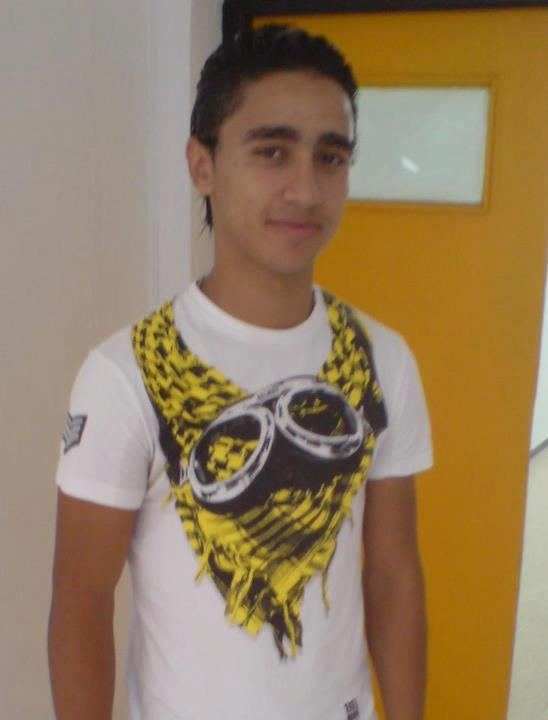
- A picture of Mohamed Mhadhebi

Personal information
- Full name: Mohamed Ali Mhadhebi
- Date of birth: 7 August 1990 (age 36)
- Place of birth: Tunis, Tunisia
- Position: Midfielder

Senior career*
Years	Team	Apps	(Gls)
2010–2013	CA Bizertin		
2013–2018	Espérance de Tunis		
2015–2016	→ CS Hammam-Lif (loan)		
2016–2017	→ CS Hammam-Lif (loan)		
- * Club domestic league appearances and goals

Mohamed Mhadhebi (born 7 August 1990) is a retired Tunisian football midfielder.
