= Pacôme Agboke =

Ivorian footballer (born 1991)

Personal information
- Full name: Pacôme Alessa Gabriel Agboke
- Date of birth: 19 April 1991 (age 35)
- Place of birth: Dabou, Ivory Coast
- Height: 1.77 m (5 ft 10 in)
- Position: Defender

Team information
- Current team: FC San Pédro

Senior career*
Years	Team	Apps	(Gls)
2012–2016	Séwé Sport		
2016–	FC San Pédro		

International career
2019–	Ivory Coast	2	(0)
- * Club domestic league appearances and goals

Pacôme Agboke (born 19 April 1991) is an Ivorian football defender who currently plays for FC San Pédro.
