= Cliff Sekete =

Zimbabwean footballer (born 1992)

Personal information
- Full name: Clifford Anotidaishe Sekete
- Date of birth: 7 September 1992 (age 34)
- Place of birth: Harare, Zimbabwe
- Position: Midfielder

Senior career*
Years	Team	Apps	(Gls)
2010–2012	Gunners		
2012–2017	Dynamos		
2018	Yadah Stars		

International career
2011	Zimbabwe	1	(0)
- * Club domestic league appearances and goals

Cliff Sekete (born 7 September 1992) is a retired Zimbabwean football midfielder.
