= Ahmed Harrane =

Tunisian footballer

Personal information
- Date of birth: 8 June 1985 (age 41)
- Place of birth: Tunis, Tunisia
- Position: Midfielder

Team information
- Current team: FC Hammamet

Senior career*
Years	Team	Apps	(Gls)
2008–2011	CS Hammam-Lif		
2011–2014	CA Bizertin		
2015	Al Nasr SC		
2015–2017	EGS Gafsa		
2017–	FC Hammamet		

International career
2013	Tunisia	2	(0)
- * Club domestic league appearances and goals

Ahmed Harrane (born 8 June 1985) is a Tunisian football midfielder who currently plays for FC Hammamet.
