= Khethokwakhe Masuku =

South African footballer

Khetokwakhe Masuku
Personal information
- Full name: Khetokwakhe Masuku
- Date of birth: 8 September 1985 (age 41)
- Place of birth: Soweto, South Africa
- Height: 1.70 m (5 ft 7 in)
- Position: Midfielder

Team information
- Current team: NB La Masia

Khethokwakhe Masuku (born 8 September 1985) is a South African association football player for NB La Masia.

His clubs include Black Leopards, Orlando Pirates, Royal Eagles, Bloemfontein Celtic, Marumo Gallants and NB La Masia.

He plays midfield, mostly used in wide positions but can also play behind the striker.
