= Thandani Ntshumayelo =

South African soccer player

Personal information
- Full name: Thandani Ntshumayelo
- Date of birth: 20 April 1990 (age 36)
- Place of birth: Heilbron, South Africa
- Height: 1.69 m (5 ft 7 in)
- Positions: Defensive midfielder; central midfielder

Team information
- Current team: Swallows
- Number: 4

Youth career
- Black Swallows
- 2005–2009: Supersport United

Senior career*
Years	Team	Apps	(Gls)
2009–2012	Supersport United	35	(1)
2012–2016	Orlando Pirates	78	(2)
2019–	Baroka	1	(0)

International career
2011–2013	South Africa	3	(0)
- * Club domestic league appearances and goals as of 23:06, 10 June 2019 (UTC)

Thandani "Bibo" Ntshumayelo was on born 20 April 1990 in Heilbron, he is a South African football midfielder who played for Swallows FC and Orlando Pirates F.C.

== Club career ==
A product of SuperSport United's youth academy, Ntshumayelo was promoted to the first team in 2009 and made 20 league starts in his maiden season in top-flight soccer. In January 2012, Ntshumayelo joined league champions Orlando Pirates. In January 2016, he received a four-year ban from football by the South African Institute for Drug Free Sport after he tested positive for a banned substance following abuse of cocaine. Ntshumayelo retired from professional football in 2023.

== International career ==
He made his international debut for South Africa versus Tanzania on 14 May 2011.

== Personal life ==
Ntshumayelo appeared in court in June 2024, accused of assaulting his girlfriend earlier that year.
