= Tychique Ntela Kalema =

Congolese footballer (born 1987)

Ntela Kalema
Personal information
- Full name: Tychique Ntela Kalema
- Date of birth: 12 December 1987 (age 38)
- Place of birth: Kinshasa, Zaire
- Height: 1.73 m (5 ft 8 in)
- Position: Midfielder

Team information
- Current team: CSMD Diables Noirs

Senior career*
Years	Team	Apps	(Gls)
2006–2007	SC Cilu		
2008–2011	AS Vita Club		
2010	→ Rot Weiss Ahlen (loan)		
2012–2017	AC Léopards		
2018–	CSMD Diables Noirs		

International career
2013	Congo DR	1	(0)
- * Club domestic league appearances and goals

Tychique Ntela Kalema (born 12 December 1987) is a Congolese footballer who plays as a midfielder for CSMD Diables Noirs in neighboring country Republic of the Congo.

== Club career ==
Kalema was born in Kinshasa. He began his career with SC Cilu and signed 2008 for AS Vita Club. He played for AS Vita Club in the Orange CAF Confederations Cup 2010. On 5 February 2010, he left AS Vita Club with Serge Lofo Bongeli to sign with German club Rot Weiss Ahlen.

== International career ==
Kalema was capped once for the Congo DR national team and represented the country twelve times. Among others he was a part of the team at African Nations Championship 2009.
