= Sifiso Myeni =

South African soccer player

Personal information
- Date of birth: 10 June 1988 (age 38)
- Place of birth: Soweto, South Africa
- Height: 1.73 m (5 ft 8 in)
- Position: Right winger

Youth career
- Dona's Mates Youth Football Academy
- Leandra FC
- Moroka Swallows

Senior career*
Years	Team	Apps	(Gls)
2008–2011	Bidvest Wits	98	(14)
2012–2016	Orlando Pirates	96	(15)
2016–2018	Bidvest Wits	28	(1)
2017	→ SuperSport United (loan)	5	(0)
2020	TS Sporting	4	(0)

International career
2011–2012	South Africa	5	(0)
- * Club domestic league appearances and goals as of 30 January 2018

Sifiso Myeni (born 10 June 1988) is a South African association football player who plays for First Division team VTM FC.

== Honours ==
- Premier Soccer League 2016–17

Bidvest Wits F.C

- MTN 8

Supersport United F.C 2017 Orlando Pirates F.C 2014
