= Mohamed Said Kordi =

Tunisian football referee

Mohamed Said Kordi (born 1975) is a Tunisian football referee.

Kordi became a FIFA referee in 2011. He has served as a referee at the 2014 FIFA World Cup qualifiers, beginning with the preliminary-round match between Ethiopia and Somalia.
