= Rooi Mahamutsa =

South African soccer player (born 1981)

Personal information
- Full name: Rooi Petros Mahamutsa
- Date of birth: 26 October 1981 (age 45)
- Place of birth: Standerton, South Africa
- Height: 1.81 m (5 ft 11 in)
- Position: Centre back

Youth career
- Highlanders FC
- Chipeya Academy

Senior career*
Years	Team	Apps	(Gls)
- PJ Stars
–2008	Witbank Spurs		
2008–2016	Orlando Pirates	151	(23)
2017–2019	Free State Stars	59	(1)
2020	Ajax Cape Town	3	(0)
2022	TS Sporting	9	(0)

International career^{‡}
2008–2013	South Africa	3	(0)
- * Club domestic league appearances and goals as of 15 November 2022 ‡ National team caps and goals as of 15 November 2022

Rooi Mahamutsa (born 26 October 1981) is a South African soccer player who plays as a defender.

== Career ==
It was Rooi Mahamutsa's goal that helped Orlando Pirates to only its second CAF Champions League final in 18 years, his header giving Pirates the lead against Esperance de Tunis of Tunisia in a game that eventually ended in a tie, with Pirates making it through by virtue of the away goal rule.
