= Rúben Gouveia =

Angolan footballer

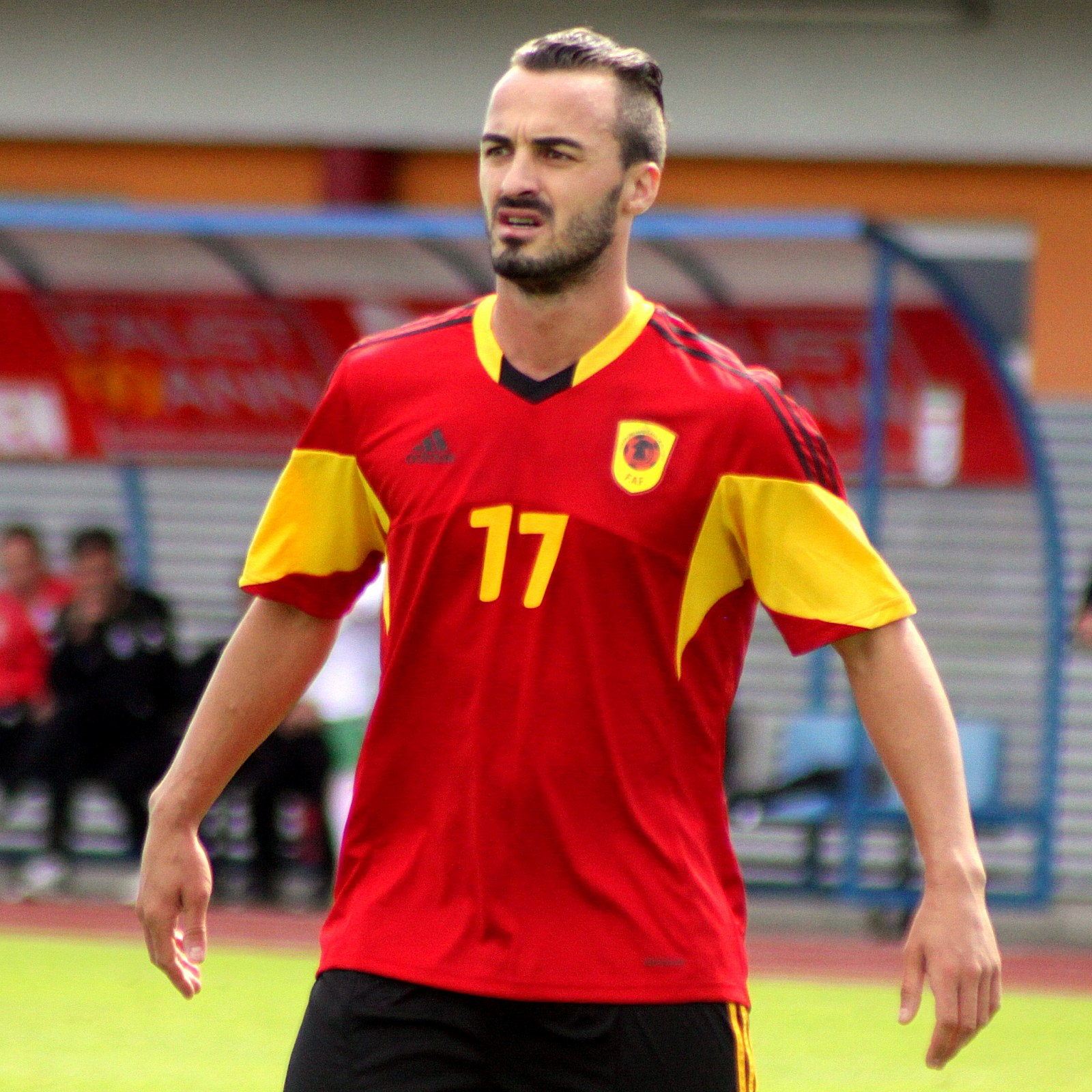
- Gouveia playing for Angola against Iran in 2014

Personal information
- Full name: Rúben Sílvio Lino Gouveia
- Date of birth: 13 March 1985 (age 41)
- Place of birth: Lisbon, Portugal
- Height: 1.73 m (5 ft 8 in)
- Position: Midfielder

Team information
- Current team: Sacavenense
- Number: 10

Youth career
- 1995–1996: Olivais
- 1996–1998: Sporting CP
- 1998–2000: Olivais
- 2000–2001: Oriental
- 2001–2004: Alverca

Senior career*
Years	Team	Apps	(Gls)
2004–2005	Desportivo Beja		
2005–2006	Sintrense		
2006–2007	Estrela Vendas Novas	23	(1)
2007–2008	Peniche		(15)
2008–2009	Real Massamá	6	(0)
2009	→ Halesowen Town (loan)	15	(3)
2009–2011	Atlético Reguengos	60	(11)
2011	Torreense	13	(5)
2012–2013	Libolo	39	(8)
2014	Caála	28	(2)
2015	Benfica Luanda	18	(1)
2016–2017	Académica Lobito	20	(6)
2017–2018	Vilafranquense	8	(0)
2018	Casa Pia	9	(1)
2018–2019	Oriental	29	(3)
2019–2020	União Santarém	15	(4)
2020–2021	Oriental	18	(3)
2021–2023	Alta de Lisboa	34	(17)
2023–	Sacavenense	10	(0)

International career
2014	Angola	7	(0)
- * Club domestic league appearances and goals as of 17:48, 16 June 2024 (UTC)

Rúben Sílvio Lino Gouveia (born 13 March 1985) is a Portuguese-Angolan professional footballer who plays for Portuguese club Sacavenense as a midfielder.

== Club career ==
Born in Lisbon, Gouveia never played at the professional level in his homeland of Portugal. At the third division, he amassed total of 186 appearances and 30 goals over ten seasons, representing Estrela de Vendas Novas, Real SC, Atlético SC, S.C.U. Torreense, U.D. Vilafranquense, Casa Pia AC, Clube Oriental de Lisboa (two spells) and União de Santarém. In January 2009, he went on loan to Halesowen Town of the English Isthmian League.

Gouveia signed for Girabola side C.R.D. Libolo in 2012. He continued to compete in the Angolan top flight the following years.

== International career ==
After receiving Angolan citizenship, Gouveia made his debut for the Angolan national team on 28 May 2014, at the age of 29, in a 2–0 win against the Moroccan national team in a friendly match.
