= Iheb Msakni =

Tunisian footballer

Personal information
- Full name: Iheb Msakni
- Date of birth: 18 July 1987 (age 39)
- Place of birth: Tunis, Tunisia
- Height: 1.86 m (6 ft 1 in)
- Position: Midfielder

Senior career*
Years	Team	Apps	(Gls)
2008–2012	Stade Tunisien	48	(7)
2009–2010	→ EGS Gafsa (loan)	14	(4)
2012–2014	ES Tunis	44	(9)
2014–2015	Al Ahed	19	(10)
2015–2023	ES Sahel	159	(28)

International career
2011–2012	Tunisia	7	(0)
- * Club domestic league appearances and goals

Iheb Msakni (Arabic: إِيهَاب الْمُسَاكِنِيّ; born 18 July 1987) is a Tunisian footballer who plays as a midfielder. He is the older brother of fellow Tunisian international Youssef.

== Honours ==
Individual

- Lebanese Premier League Team of the Season: 2014–15
