= Alexis Kada =

Cameroonian footballer

Personal information
- Full name: Alexis Yougouda Kada
- Date of birth: 29 November 1994 (age 31)
- Place of birth: Mokolo, Cameroon
- Height: 1.81 m (5 ft 11 in)
- Position: Midfielder

Team information
- Current team: Gazelle Garoua

Senior career*
Years	Team	Apps	(Gls)
2011–2014	Coton Sport		
2014–2015	Nantes B	0	(0)
2015–2016	Coton Sport		
2016–2017	Örgryte	16	(0)
2018–2019	Coton Sport		
2019–	Maghreb de Fés		
2021	New Star de Douala		
2022–	Gazelle Garoua		

International career
2013	Cameroon	1	(0)
- * Club domestic league appearances and goals as of 13:33, 26 April 2020 (UTC)

Alexis Yougouda Kada (born 29 November 1994) is a Cameroonian professional footballer who plays as a midfielder for Gazelle Garoua. In 2013, he made an international appearance for the Cameroon national team.

== Career ==
Born in Mokolo, Kada has played club football for Coton Sport, Nantes B and Örgryte.

He made his international debut for Cameroon in 2013.
