= Bouchaïb El Ahrach =

Moroccan football referee

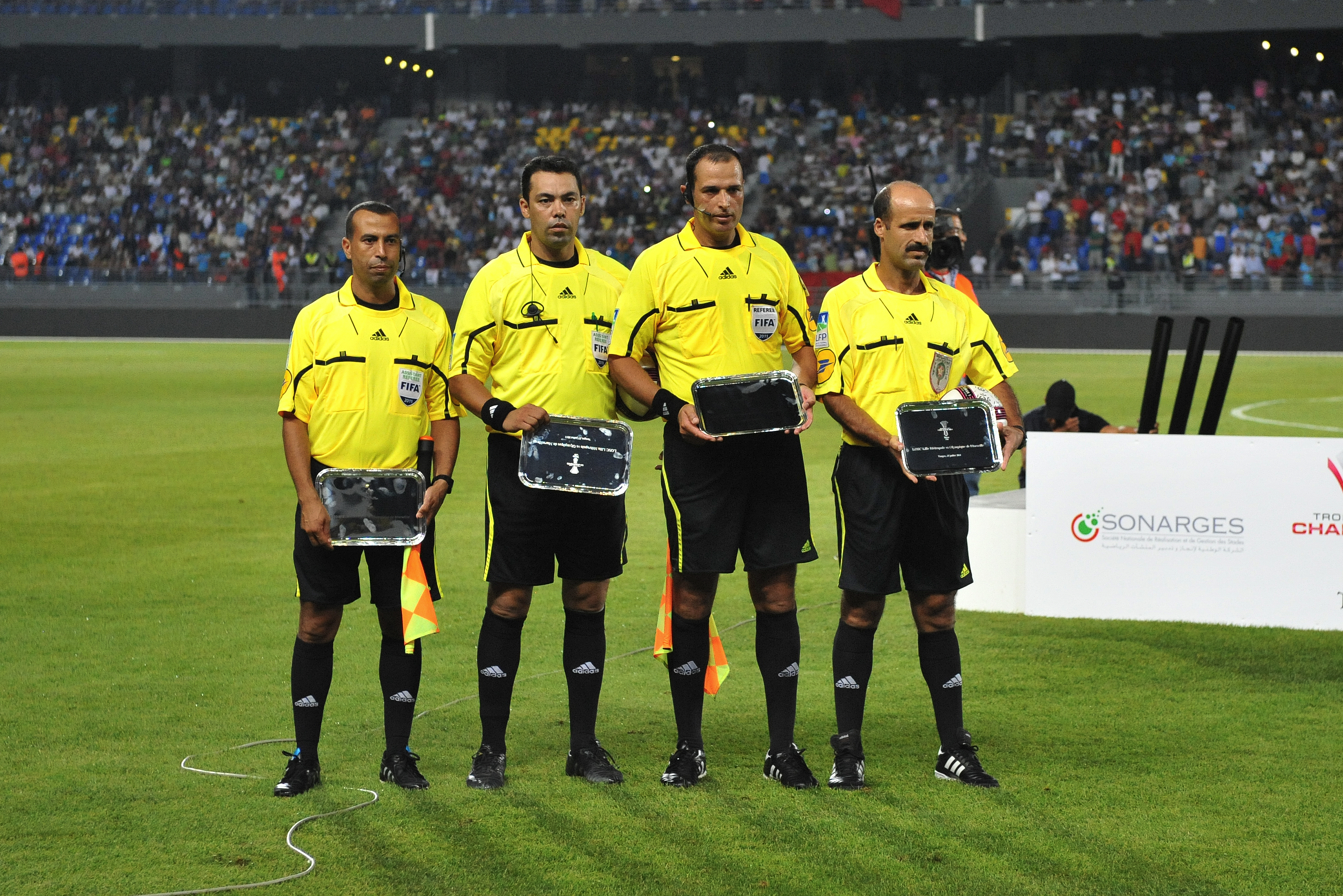
- Full name: Bouchaïb El Ahrach
- Born: 5 September 1972 (age 54); Tetuan, Morocco
| Years | | Role |

Bouchaïb El Ahrach, born September 5, 1972, in Tetuan, is a Moroccan football referee.
