= Orlando Stadium =

Stadium in Soweto, South Africa

- eSgodini, eSika Maminzela iSgodi
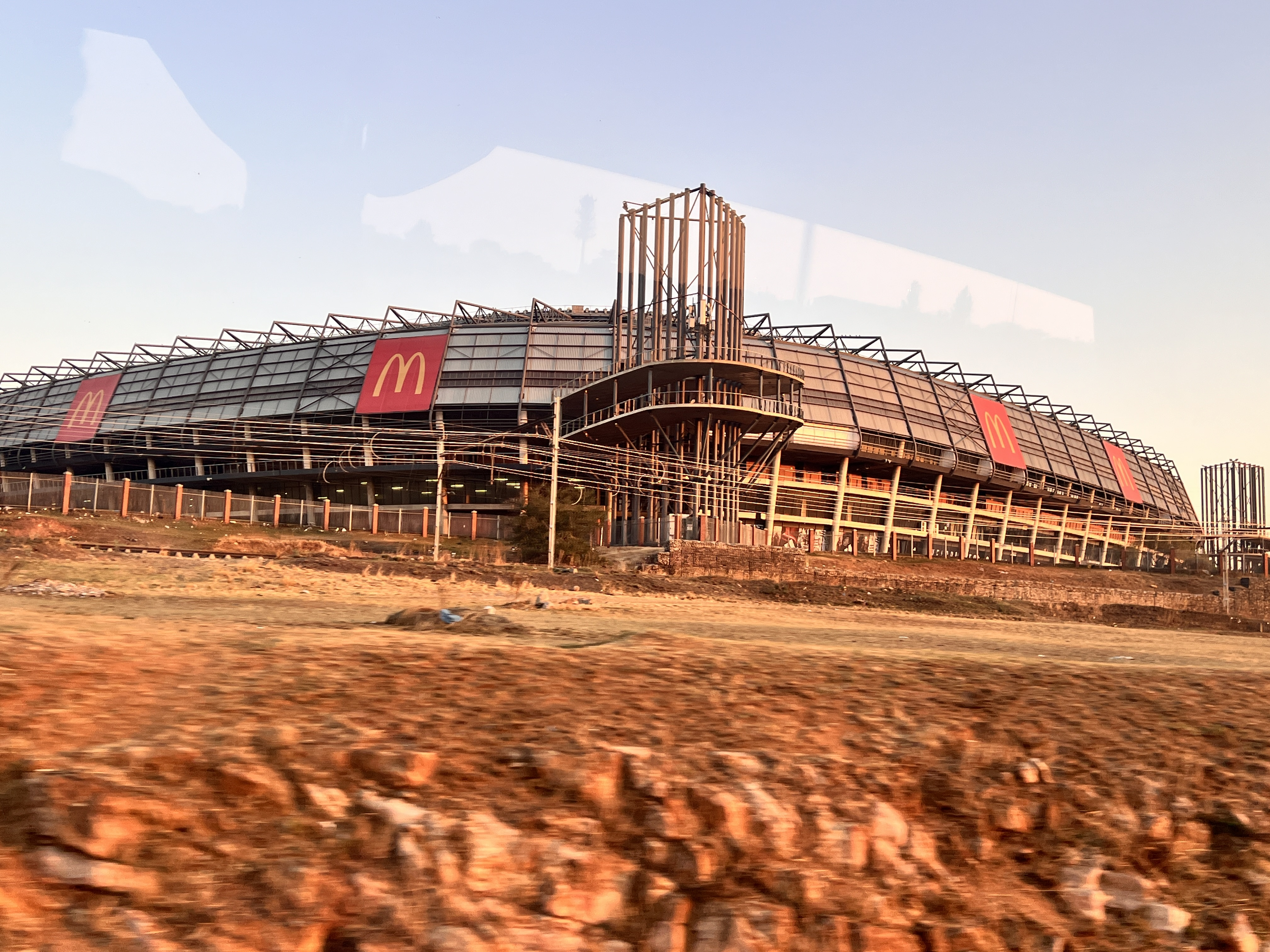
- Interactive map of Orlando Stadium
- Location: Mooki St., Orlando East, Soweto, Johannesburg, South Africa
- Coordinates: 26°13′54.82″S 27°55′22.41″E
- Owner: City of Johannesburg
- Operator: Stadium Management South Africa
- Capacity: 37,313
- Surface: Grass

Construction
- Opened: 1959
- Renovated: 2008–2010
- Cost: R280 million (2008 refurbishment)

Tenant
- Orlando Pirates (1970–present)

Orlando Stadium, officially known as Orlando Amstel Arena for sponsorship reasons, is a multi-purpose stadium in Soweto, a township in Johannesburg, in Gauteng province in South Africa. It is the home venue for Orlando Pirates Football Club, a professional soccer team that plays in the Premiership, and is owned by the City of Johannesburg.

Orlando Stadium has hosted an MTN 8 Cup Final and a Nedbank Cup Final.

== Today ==
It is currently used mostly for soccer matches, as the home stadium of Orlando Pirates, and was intended to be utilized as a training field for teams participating in the 2010 FIFA World Cup after it was completely rebuilt to FIFA specifications and reopened on 22 November 2008. In addition to the stadium capacity of 36,761 people, there is an auditorium for 200 people, 120 hospitality suites, a gymnasium and a conference centre.

== History ==
In 1958, James Mpanza sent a proposal to the City of Johannesburg for a stadium in Orlando, which resulted in the construction of Orlando Stadium in 1959. The stadium was originally built for the Johannesburg Bantu Football Association and it had a seating capacity of 24,000 and cost £37,500 to construct. It was opened by the Minister for Bantu development, MC de Wet Nel, and Ian Maltz who was then Mayor of Johannesburg on 2 May 1959.

Although intended for football the stadium has been used for concerts by the Jazz musicians Molombo and by the O'Jays. Boxing matches were also staged including the 1975 victory of Elijah 'Tap Tap' Makhatini over the world welterweight and middleweight champion Emile Griffith.

On 16 June 1976, thousands of black students marched to Orlando Stadium to protest at having to learn the Afrikaans language. It was intended to be a rally and although it was organised some of the students only joined the protest on the day. It was planned to be a peaceful protest by the Soweto Students’ Representative Council's (SSRC) Action Committee. The marchers got as far as their last meeting point when the police and tear gas arrived. The day ended in deaths and this was the start of the Soweto Uprising.

In 1978, the Orlando Pirates took on Phil Venter who had been the first White National Football Association player to play for a black side. He was soon joined by another white player Keith Broad.

In 1995, the stadium played host to the funeral of African National Congress stalwart, Joe Slovo, as well as that of Walter Sisulu in 2003 where Thabo Mbeki, Nelson Mandela, Joaquim Chissano of Mozambique, Robert Mugabe of Zimbabwe, and Pakalitha Mosisili of Lesotho were among the mourners.
In 2011, the stadium hosted the funeral of Albertina Sisulu where Jacob Zuma, Jakaya Kikwete of Tanzania, and Kenneth Kaunda of Zambia were among the mourners, and also hosted the funeral of Winnie Mandela in 2018 where Cyril Ramaphosa; former presidents Thabo Mbeki, Kgalema Motlanthe, and Jacob Zuma; Hage Geingob of Namibia; Denis Sassou Nguesso of Congo-Brazzaville; Mokgweetsi Masisi of Botswana; and Naomi Campbell of Britain were amongst the mourners.

In 1994, South Africa became democratic. On the anniversary of the Soweto Uprising, Nelson Mandela gave a speech at this stadium, where he committed the country to look after its children.

== Redevelopment ==
From 2008 to 2010, the stadium was rebuilt with a steel frame and this increased the capacity to 36,761 at a cost of 280m Rand.

== Other uses ==
The stadium hosted a Super 14 Rugby union semi-final in 2010, as well as the 2010 Super 14 Final, a week later. This was due to the Bulls' usual home ground Loftus Versfeld Stadium being unavailable, due to the 2010 FIFA World Cup. Orlando Stadium was used as a training venue for the 2010 FIFA World Cup, it also hosted the FIFA World Cup Kick-Off Celebration Concert on 10 June 2010, featuring artists such as Hugh Masekela, the Parlotones, Freshlyground, the Soweto Gospel Choir, Alicia Keys, The Who, Kelly Clarkson, Mariah Carey, Rod Stewart, the Dave Matthews Band, Manfred Mann's Earth Band, Justin Bieber, John Legend, the Black Eyed Peas, and Shakira.
