= 2015 CAF Confederation Cup qualifying rounds =

- Dates: 13 February – 3 May 2015

The 2015 CAF Confederation Cup qualifying rounds were played from 13 February to 3 May 2015. A total of 63 teams competed in the international football qualifying rounds to decide the eight places in the group stage of the 2015 CAF Confederation Cup.

== Draw ==
The draw for the preliminary, first and second qualifying rounds was held on 22 December 2014 at the CAF headquarters in Cairo, Egypt. The entry round of each team was determined by their ranking points calculated based on performances in continental club championships for the period 2010–2014.

The following 55 teams were entered into the draw:

| Byes to first round | Entrants to preliminary round |
|---|---|
| (Democratic Republic of the Congo) AS Vita Club (20 pts); (Egypt) Zamalek (16 pts); (South Africa) Orlando Pirates (16 pts); (Mali) Djoliba (10 pts); (Tunisia) Étoile du Sahel (9 pts); (Morocco) FUS Rabat (8 pts); (Ivory Coast) ASEC Mimosas (7 pts); (Tunisia) Club Africain (6 pts); (Sudan) Al-Ahly Shendi (3 pts) | (Algeria) ASO Chlef (6 pts); (Algeria) MC Alger (2 pts); (Libya) Al-Ittihad (2 pts); (Egypt) Petrojet; (Democratic Republic of the Congo) MK Étanchéité; (Morocco) RS Berkane; (Nigeria) Warri Wolves; (Nigeria) Dolphins; (Sudan) Al-Khartoum; (Mali) Onze Créateurs; (Cameroon) Unisport Bafang; (Cameroon) Panthère du Ndé; (Republic of the Congo) Étoile du Congo; (Republic of the Congo) CARA Brazzaville; (South Africa) Bidvest Wits; (Angola) Benfica de Luanda; (Angola) Petro de Luanda; (Ghana) Hearts of Oak; (Ethiopia) Dedebit; (Zambia) Power Dynamos; (Zimbabwe) FC Platinum; (Niger) Sahel SC; (Benin) AS Police; Botswana Defence Force; (Burkina Faso) RC Bobo; (Burundi) Le Messager Ngozi; (Chad) Elect-Sport; (Comoros) Volcan Club; (Equatorial Guinea) Leones Vegetarianos; (Gabon) CF Mounana; (Guinea) Horoya; (Kenya) Sofapaka; (Liberia) Fassell; (Madagascar) ASSM Elgeco Plus; (Mauritius) Petite Rivière Noire; (Mozambique) Ferroviário da Beira; (Rwanda) Rayon Sports; (Senegal) Olympique de Ngor; (Seychelles) Côte d'Or; (Sierra Leone) Kamboi Eagles; (South Sudan) Al-Ghazal; (Eswatini) Royal Leopards; (Tanzania) Young Africans; AS Togo-Port; (Uganda) URA; (Zanzibar) Polisi |

== Format ==
Qualification ties were played on a home-and-away two-legged basis. If the aggregate score was tied after the second leg, the away goals rule would be applied, and if still level, the penalty shoot-out would be used to determine the winner (no extra time would be played).

== Schedule ==
The schedule of each round was as follows.

| Round | First leg | Second leg |
|---|---|---|
| Preliminary round | 13–15 February 2015 | 27 February–1 March 2015 |
| First round | 13–15 March 2015 | 3–5 April 2015 |
| Second round | 17–19 April 2015 | 1–3 May 2015 |
| Play-off round | 15–17 May 2015 | 5–7 June 2015 |

== Bracket ==
The eight winners of the second round advanced to the play-off round, where they were joined by the eight losers of the Champions League second round.

Preliminary round
(Morocco) RS Berkane | 2 | 0 | 2
(Mali) Onze Créateurs (a) | 1 | 1 | 2
(Algeria) MC Alger | 0 | 0 | 0
(Niger) Sahel SC | 0 | 2 | 2
(Ivory Coast) ASEC Mimosas | — | — | —
Bye | — | — | —
(Libya) Al-Ittihad | 6 | 1 | 7
(Chad) Elect-Sport | 1 | 0 | 1

First round
(Mali) Onze Créateurs | 2 | 0 | 2
(Niger) Sahel SC | 1 | 0 | 1
(Ivory Coast) ASEC Mimosas | 1 | 2 | 3
(Libya) Al-Ittihad | 1 | 1 | 2

Second round
(Mali) Onze Créateurs | 0 | 0 | 0
(Ivory Coast) ASEC Mimosas | 1 | 2 | 3

Preliminary round
(Mali) Djoliba | — | — | —
Bye | — | — | —
(South Sudan) Al-Ghazal | 0 | 1 | 1
(Egypt) Petrojet | 1 | 6 | 7
(Ghana) Hearts of Oak | 1 | 0 | 1
(Benin) AS Police | 0 | 0 | 0
(Cameroon) Unisport Bafang | 1 | 1 | 2
(Senegal) Olympique de Ngor | 0 | 3 | 3

First round
(Mali) Djoliba | 2 | 0 | 2
(Egypt) Petrojet | 1 | 0 | 1
(Ghana) Hearts of Oak | 2 | 3 | 5
(Senegal) Olympique de Ngor | 1 | 2 | 3

Second round
(Mali) Djoliba | 1 | 1 | 2
(Ghana) Hearts of Oak (a) | 2 | 0 | 2

Preliminary round
(Guinea) Horoya | 1 | 3 | 4
(Liberia) Fassell | 0 | 3 | 3
(Algeria) ASO Chlef | 2 | 0 | 2
(Sierra Leone) Kamboi Eagles | 0 | 1 | 1
(Tunisia) Club Africain | — | — | —
Bye | — | — | —
(Equatorial Guinea) Leones Vegetarianos | 1 | 0 | 1(3)
(Nigeria) Dolphins (pen.) | 0 | 1 | 1(5)

First round
(Guinea) Horoya | 1 | 0 | 1(3)
(Algeria) ASO Chlef (pen.) | 0 | 1 | 1(5)
(Tunisia) Club Africain (w/o) | — | — | —
(Nigeria) Dolphins | — | — | —

Second round
(Algeria) ASO Chlef | 1 | 0 | 1
(Tunisia) Club Africain | 1 | 1 | 2

Preliminary round
(Burkina Faso) RC Bobo | 0 | 0 | 0
(Nigeria) Warri Wolves | 1 | 3 | 4
(Seychelles) Côte d'Or | 2 | 0 | 2
(Ethiopia) Dedebit | 3 | 2 | 5
(Sudan) Al-Ahly Shendi | — | — | —
Bye | — | — | —
(Republic of the Congo) Étoile du Congo | 1 | 1 | 2
(Democratic Republic of the Congo) MK Étanchéité | 2 | 1 | 3

First round
(Nigeria) Warri Wolves | 2 | 0 | 2
(Ethiopia) Dedebit | 0 | 0 | 0
(Sudan) Al-Ahly Shendi | 2 | 1 | 3
(Democratic Republic of the Congo) MK Étanchéité | 1 | 5 | 6

Second round
(Nigeria) Warri Wolves | 2 | 1 | 3
(Democratic Republic of the Congo) MK Étanchéité | 1 | 0 | 1

Preliminary round
(Egypt) Zamalek | — | — | —
Bye | — | — | —
(Cameroon) Panthère du Ndé | 0 | 0 | 0
(Rwanda) Rayon Sports | 1 | 1 | 2
(Morocco) FUS Rabat | — | — | —
Bye | — | — | —
AS Togo-Port | 2 | 3 | 5
(Republic of the Congo) CARA Brazzaville | 0 | 3 | 3

First round
(Egypt) Zamalek | 3 | 3 | 6
(Rwanda) Rayon Sports | 1 | 0 | 1
(Morocco) FUS Rabat | 3 | 1 | 4
AS Togo-Port | 0 | 2 | 2

Second round
(Egypt) Zamalek | 0 | 3 | 3
(Morocco) FUS Rabat | 0 | 2 | 2

Preliminary round
(Gabon) CF Mounana | 5 | 3 | 8
(Zanzibar) Polisi | 0 | 1 | 1
(Sudan) Al-Khartoum | 1 | 0 | 1
(Zambia) Power Dynamos | 0 | 2 | 2
(South Africa) Orlando Pirates | — | — | —
Bye | — | — | —
(Uganda) URA | 3 | 1 | 4
(Madagascar) ASSM Elgeco Plus | 2 | 0 | 2

First round
(Gabon) CF Mounana | 4 | 0 | 4
(Zambia) Power Dynamos | 0 | 3 | 3
(South Africa) Orlando Pirates | 2 | 2 | 4
(Uganda) URA | 1 | 2 | 3

Second round
(Gabon) CF Mounana | 2 | 0 | 2
(South Africa) Orlando Pirates | 2 | 3 | 5

Preliminary round
(Tanzania) Young Africans | 2 | 1 | 3
Botswana Defence Force | 0 | 2 | 2
(Kenya) Sofapaka | 1 | 1 | 2
(Zimbabwe) FC Platinum | 2 | 2 | 4
(Tunisia) Étoile du Sahel | — | — | —
Bye | — | — | —
(Angola) Benfica de Luanda | 2 | 1 | 3
(Burundi) Le Messager Ngozi | 0 | 0 | 0

First round
(Tanzania) Young Africans | 5 | 0 | 5
(Zimbabwe) FC Platinum | 1 | 1 | 2
(Tunisia) Étoile du Sahel | 1 | 1 | 2
(Angola) Benfica de Luanda | 0 | 1 | 1

Second round
(Tanzania) Young Africans | 1 | 0 | 1
(Tunisia) Étoile du Sahel | 1 | 1 | 2

Preliminary round
(South Africa) Bidvest Wits | 3 | 0 | 3(6)
(Eswatini) Royal Leopards (pen.) | 0 | 3 | 3(7)
(Comoros) Volcan Club | 0 | 0 | 0
(Angola) Petro de Luanda | 1 | 4 | 5
(Democratic Republic of the Congo) AS Vita Club | — | — | —
Bye | — | — | —
(Mauritius) Petite Rivière Noire | 1 | 2 | 3
(Mozambique) Ferroviário da Beira | 2 | 5 | 7

First round
(Eswatini) Royal Leopards | 2 | 1 | 3
(Angola) Petro de Luanda | 2 | 0 | 2
(Democratic Republic of the Congo) AS Vita Club | 3 | 0 | 3
(Mozambique) Ferroviário da Beira | 0 | 1 | 1

Second round
(Eswatini) Royal Leopards | 1 | 1 | 2
(Democratic Republic of the Congo) AS Vita Club | 0 | 4 | 4

== Preliminary round ==
The preliminary round included the 46 teams that did not receive byes to the first round.

| Team 1 | Agg. | Team 2 | 1st leg | 2nd leg |
|---|---|---|---|---|
| MC Alger (Algeria) | 0–2 | (Niger) Sahel SC | 0–0 | 0–2 |
| RS Berkane (Morocco) | 2–2 (a) | (Mali) Onze Créateurs | 2–1 | 0–1 |
| Al-Ittihad (Libya) | 7–1 | (Chad) Elect-Sport | 6–1 | 1–0 |
| Al-Ghazal (South Sudan) | 1–7 | (Egypt) Petrojet | 0–1 | 1–6 |
| Unisport Bafang (Cameroon) | 2–3 | (Senegal) Olympique de Ngor | 1–0 | 1–3 |
| Hearts of Oak (Ghana) | 1–0 | (Benin) AS Police | 1–0 | 0–0 |
| ASO Chlef (Algeria) | 2–1 | (Sierra Leone) Kamboi Eagles | 2–0 | 0–1 |
| Horoya (Guinea) | 4–3 | (Liberia) Fassell | 1–0 | 3–3 |
| Leones Vegetarianos (Equatorial Guinea) | 1–1 (3–5 p) | (Nigeria) Dolphins | 1–0 | 0–1 |
| Côte d'Or (Seychelles) | 2–5 | (Ethiopia) Dedebit | 2–3 | 0–2 |
| RC Bobo (Burkina Faso) | 0–4 | (Nigeria) Warri Wolves | 0–1 | 0–3 |
| Étoile du Congo (Republic of the Congo) | 2–3 | (Democratic Republic of the Congo) MK Étanchéité | 1–2 | 1–1 |
| Panthère du Ndé (Cameroon) | 0–2 | (Rwanda) Rayon Sports | 0–1 | 0–1 |
| AS Togo-Port | 5–3 | (Republic of the Congo) CARA Brazzaville | 2–0 | 3–3 |
| Al-Khartoum (Sudan) | 1–2 | (Zambia) Power Dynamos | 1–0 | 0–2 |
| CF Mounana (Gabon) | 8–1 | (Zanzibar) Polisi | 5–0 | 3–1 |
| URA (Uganda) | 4–2 | (Madagascar) ASSM Elgeco Plus | 3–2 | 1–0 |
| Sofapaka (Kenya) | 2–4 | (Zimbabwe) FC Platinum | 1–2 | 1–2 |
| Young Africans (Tanzania) | 3–2 | Botswana Defence Force | 2–0 | 1–2 |
| Benfica de Luanda (Angola) | 3–0 | (Burundi) Le Messager Ngozi | 2–0 | 1–0 |
| Volcan Club (Comoros) | 0–5 | (Angola) Petro de Luanda | 0–1 | 0–4 |
| Bidvest Wits (South Africa) | 3–3 (6–7 p) | (Eswatini) Royal Leopards | 3–0 | 0–3 |
| Petite Rivière Noire (Mauritius) | 3–7 | (Mozambique) Ferroviário da Beira | 1–2 | 2–5 |

14 February 2015
16:00 UTC+1

| MC Alger (Algeria) | 0–0 | (Niger) Sahel SC |
|---|---|---|
| | Report |

Stade Omar Hamadi, Algiers
Referee: Mohamed El Hanafy (Egypt)
28 February 2015
16:00 UTC+1

| Sahel SC (Niger) | 2–0 | (Algeria) MC Alger |
|---|---|---|
| Ali 16'; Dan Kowa 52' | Report |

Stade Municipal, Niamey
Referee: Daniel Laryea (Ghana)

Sahel SC won 2–0 on aggregate.

13 February 2015
18:00 UTC±0

| RS Berkane (Morocco) | 2–1 | (Mali) Onze Créateurs |
|---|---|---|
| Baltam 39'; Aziz 51' | Report | Sissoko 71' |

Stade Municipal de Berkane, Berkane
Referee: Slim Belkhouas (Tunisia)
28 February 2015
16:00 UTC±0

| Onze Créateurs (Mali) | 1–0 | (Morocco) RS Berkane |
|---|---|---|
| Assoko 90+7' | Report |

Stade Modibo Kéïta, Bamako
Referee: Isaac Montgomery (Liberia)

2–2 on aggregate. Onze Créateurs won on away goals.

15 February 2015
14:00 UTC+1

| Al-Ittihad (Libya) | 6–1 | (Chad) Elect-Sport |
|---|---|---|
| Abushnaf 40' (pen.), 42', 63'; Mohamed 46'; Al Badri 48'; Sabbou 81' | Report | Ndoubam 44' |

Stade El Menzah, Tunis (Tunisia)
Referee: Khalid Ennouni (Morocco)
28 February 2015
15:00 UTC+1

| Elect-Sport (Chad) | 0–1 | (Libya) Al-Ittihad |
|---|---|---|
| | Report | Al-Tabal 41' |

Stade Omnisports Idriss Mahamat Ouya, N'Djamena
Referee: Christopher Nde (Cameroon)

Note: The first leg was played outside of Libya due to security concerns.
Al-Ittihad won 7–1 on aggregate.

13 February 2015
16:30 UTC+3

| Al-Ghazal (South Sudan) | 0–1 | (Egypt) Petrojet |
|---|---|---|
| | Report | Shebeita 28' |

Juba Stadium, Juba
Referee: Brian Miiro (Uganda)
1 March 2015
14:30 UTC+2

| Petrojet (Egypt) | 6–1 | (South Sudan) Al-Ghazal |
|---|---|---|
| El-Masry 12', 48'; Ragab 42', 88'; Gamal 65'; Owoboskini 85' | Report | Rakuba 59' |

Suez Stadium, Suez
Referee: Mohamed Ragab Omar (Libya)

Petrojet won 7–1 on aggregate.

15 February 2015
15:30 UTC+1

| Unisport Bafang (Cameroon) | 1–0 | (Senegal) Olympique de Ngor |
|---|---|---|
| Ndzie 44' | Report |

Stade de la Réunification, Douala
Referee: Yves Roponat (Gabon)
28 February 2015
17:00 UTC±0

| Olympique de Ngor (Senegal) | 3–1 | (Cameroon) Unisport Bafang |
|---|---|---|
| Sène 5', 19'; Niang 16' | Report | Amougou 90' |

Stade Demba Diop, Dakar
Referee: Raymond Coker (Sierra Leone)

Olympique de Ngor won 3–2 on aggregate.

15 February 2015
15:00 UTC±0

| Hearts of Oak (Ghana) | 1–0 | (Benin) AS Police |
|---|---|---|
| Adjei 47' | Report |

Accra Sports Stadium, Accra
Referee: Kouamé N'Dri (Ivory Coast)
28 February 2015
16:00 UTC+1

| AS Police (Benin) | 0–0 | (Ghana) Hearts of Oak |
|---|---|---|
| | Report |

Stade de l'Amitié, Cotonou
Referee: Benjamin Odey (Nigeria)

Hearts of Oak won 1–0 on aggregate.

15 February 2015
18:00 UTC+1

| ASO Chlef (Algeria) | 2–0 | (Sierra Leone) Kamboi Eagles |
|---|---|---|
| Kouakou 22'; Semahi 79' | Report |

Stade Mohamed Boumezrag, Chlef
Referee: Rédouane Jiyed (Morocco)
20 February 2015
18:00 UTC+1

| Kamboi Eagles (Sierra Leone) | 1–0 | (Algeria) ASO Chlef |
|---|---|---|
| Kella 23' | Report |

Stade Mohamed Boumezrag, Chlef (Algeria)
Referee: Amadou Thiam (Mauritania)

Note: The second leg was played outside of Sierra Leone due to Ebola outbreak (also brought forward by a week).
ASO Chlef won 2–1 on aggregate.

15 February 2015
17:00 UTC±0

| Horoya (Guinea) | 1–0 | (Liberia) Fassell |
|---|---|---|
| Nikièma 57' | Report |

Stade du 26 Mars, Bamako (Mali)
Referee: Omar Sallah (Gambia)
22 February 2015
17:00 UTC±0

| Fassell (Liberia) | 3–3 | (Guinea) Horoya |
|---|---|---|
| Vitalis 27', 29', 39' (pen.) | Report | Dipita 11'; Koulibaly 32'; Kouyaté 56' |

Stade du 26 Mars, Bamako (Mali)
Referee: António Rodrigues (Cape Verde)

Note: Both legs were played outside of Guinea and Liberia due to Ebola outbreak (second leg also brought forward by a week).
Horoya won 4–3 on aggregate.

14 February 2015
16:00 UTC+1

| Leones Vegetarianos (Equatorial Guinea) | 1–0 | (Nigeria) Dolphins |
|---|---|---|
| Keumian 49' | Report |

Estadio Internacional, Malabo
Referee: Serge Soumou (Congo)
28 February 2015
16:00 UTC+1

| Dolphins (Nigeria) | 1–0 | (Equatorial Guinea) Leones Vegetarianos |
|---|---|---|
| Atuloma 28' | Report |
Penalties
| Adamu (penalty scored); Atuloma (penalty scored); Ezuruike (penalty scored); Ihunda (penalty scored); Pyagbara (penalty scored) | 5–3 | (penalty scored) Nicanor; (penalty missed) Keumian; (penalty scored) Pendah; (penalty scored) Ada |

Liberation Stadium, Port Harcourt
Referee: Boukari Ouedraogo (Burkina Faso)

1–1 on aggregate. Dolphins won on penalties.

14 February 2015
16:00 UTC+4

| Côte d'Or (Seychelles) | 2–3 | (Ethiopia) Dedebit |
|---|---|---|
| Rosette 35'; Ravelmanatsoa 87' | Report | Fekadu 50', 64'; Sanumi 80' |

Amitié Stadium, Praslin
Referee: Samuel Chirindza (Mozambique)
28 February 2015
16:00 UTC+3

| Dedebit (Ethiopia) | 2–0 | (Seychelles) Côte d'Or |
|---|---|---|
| Tesfaye 11'; Fekadu 67' | Report |

Bahir Dar Stadium, Bahir Dar
Referee: Mutaz Khairalla (Sudan)

Dedebit won 5–2 on aggregate.

14 February 2015
15:30 UTC±0

| RC Bobo (Burkina Faso) | 0–1 | (Nigeria) Warri Wolves |
|---|---|---|
| | Report | Azeez 83' |

Stade Municipal, Bobo-Dioulasso
Referee: Ibrahim Mamane (Niger)
28 February 2015
16:00 UTC+1

| Warri Wolves (Nigeria) | 3–0 | (Burkina Faso) RC Bobo |
|---|---|---|
| Oghenekaro 30'; Osadiaye 60'; Omofoman 69' | Report |

Warri Township Stadium, Warri
Referee: Falou Galasse Kane (Senegal)

Warri Wolves won 4–0 on aggregate.

14 February 2015
15:30 UTC+1

| Étoile du Congo (Republic of the Congo) | 1–2 | (Democratic Republic of the Congo) MK Étanchéité |
|---|---|---|
| Nkounkou 12' | Report | Kadima 34'; Mambunzu 87' |

Stade Omnisport Marien Ngouabi d'Owando, Owando
Referee: Eric Otogo-Castane (Gabon)
27 February 2015
15:30 UTC+1

| MK Étanchéité (Democratic Republic of the Congo) | 1–1 | (Republic of the Congo) Étoile du Congo |
|---|---|---|
| Lusala 83' | Report | Olando 90' |

Stade Tata Raphaël, Kinshasa
Referee: Issa Kagabo (Rwanda)

MK Étanchéité won 3–2 on aggregate.

14 February 2015
15:30 UTC+1

| Panthère du Ndé (Cameroon) | 0–1 | (Rwanda) Rayon Sports |
|---|---|---|
| | Report | Uwambazimana 7' |

Stade de la Réunification, Douala
Referee: Numbi Pierre Kibingo (DR Congo)
1 March 2015
15:30 UTC+2

| Rayon Sports (Rwanda) | 1–0 | (Cameroon) Panthère du Ndé |
|---|---|---|
| Muganza 13' | Report |

Amahoro Stadium, Kigali
Referee: Anthony Ogwayo (Kenya)

Rayon Sports won 2–0 on aggregate.

15 February 2015
15:00 UTC±0

| AS Togo-Port | 2–0 | (Republic of the Congo) CARA Brazzaville |
|---|---|---|
| Agbodo 32'; Tsogbé 62' | Report |

Stade Municipal, Lomé
Referee: Eugene Tohouegnon (Benin)
28 February 2015
15:30 UTC+1

| CARA Brazzaville (Republic of the Congo) | 3–3 | AS Togo-Port |
|---|---|---|
| Baleckita 11', 74'; Bagouadila 69' | Report | Agbégniadan 9', 53'; Tsogbé 76' (pen.) |

Stade Municipal, Pointe-Noire
Referee: Farouk Houasnia (Algeria)

AS Togo-Port won 5–3 on aggregate.

14 February 2015
20:00 UTC+3

| Al-Khartoum (Sudan) | 1–0 | (Zambia) Power Dynamos |
|---|---|---|
| Daouda 19' | Report |

Khartoum Stadium, Khartoum
Referee: Amanuel Eyob (Eritrea)
1 March 2015
15:00 UTC+2

| Power Dynamos (Zambia) | 2–0 | (Sudan) Al-Khartoum |
|---|---|---|
| Ngonga 19', 90+4' (pen.) | Report |

Arthur Davies Stadium, Kitwe
Referee: Idriss Biani (Chad)

Power Dynamos won 2–1 on aggregate.

15 February 2015
15:30 UTC+1

| CF Mounana (Gabon) | 5–0 | (Zanzibar) Polisi |
|---|---|---|
| Biyoghe 14'; Ambourouet 17', 79'; Ouédraogo 27'; Guedegbe 77' | Report |

Stade Augustin Monédan de Sibang, Libreville
Referee: Raul Aguiar dos Santos (São Tomé and Príncipe)
1 March 2015
16:30 UTC+3

| Polisi (Zanzibar) | 1–3 | (Gabon) CF Mounana |
|---|---|---|
| Mwita 20' | Report | Ambourouet 16' (pen.), 78' (pen.); Diouf 21' |

Amaan Stadium, Zanzibar City
Referee: Haileyesus Bazezew (Ethiopia)

CF Mounana won 8–1 on aggregate.

13 February 2015
16:00 UTC+3

| URA (Uganda) | 3–2 | (Madagascar) ASSM Elgeco Plus |
|---|---|---|
| Ssentongo 65', 75'; Kalanda 81' | Report | Njilamanana 47' (pen.); Rajoarimanana 70' (pen.) |

Mandela National Stadium, Kampala
Referee: Djamel Aden Abdi (Djibouti)
28 February 2015
14:30 UTC+3

| ASSM Elgeco Plus (Madagascar) | 0–1 | (Uganda) URA |
|---|---|---|
| | Report | Ssentongo 5' |

Mahamasina Municipal Stadium, Antananarivo
Referee: Sentso Mohau (Lesotho)

URA won 4–2 on aggregate.

15 February 2015
15:00 UTC+3

| Sofapaka (Kenya) | 1–2 | (Zimbabwe) FC Platinum |
|---|---|---|
| Abdul Razak 48' | Report | Muzondiwa 26'; Ngoma 75' |

Nyayo National Stadium, Nairobi
Referee: El Fatih Wadeed Khaleel (Sudan)
28 February 2015
15:00 UTC+2

| FC Platinum (Zimbabwe) | 2–1 | (Kenya) Sofapaka |
|---|---|---|
| Mutasa 15', 51' | Report | Abdul Razak 5' |

Mandava Stadium, Zvishavane
Referee: Tirelo Mositwane (Botswana)

FC Platinum won 4–2 on aggregate.

14 February 2015
16:00 UTC+3

| Young Africans (Tanzania) | 2–0 | Botswana Defence Force |
|---|---|---|
| Tambwe 1', 55' | Report |

National Stadium, Dar es Salaam
Referee: Thierry Nkurunziza (Burundi)
27 February 2015
19:30 UTC+2

| Botswana Defence Force | 2–1 | (Tanzania) Young Africans |
|---|---|---|
| Mosimanyana 48'; Madziba 86' | Report | Ngasa 30' |

Lobatse Stadium, Lobatse
Referee: Kulasande Qongqo (South Africa)

Young Africans won 3–2 on aggregate.

13 February 2015
18:00 UTC+1

| Benfica de Luanda (Angola) | 2–0 | (Burundi) Le Messager Ngozi |
|---|---|---|
| Fabrício 28', 41' | Report |

Estádio 11 de Novembro, Luanda
Referee: Hagi Wiish (Somalia)
1 March 2015
15:30 UTC+2

| Le Messager Ngozi (Burundi) | 0–1 | (Angola) Benfica de Luanda |
|---|---|---|
| | Report | Vado 65' |

Prince Louis Rwagasore Stadium, Bujumbura
Referee: Idris Mehammed Osman (Eritrea)

Benfica de Luanda won 3–0 on aggregate.

14 February 2015
15:00 UTC+3

| Volcan Club (Comoros) | 0–1 | (Angola) Petro de Luanda |
|---|---|---|
| | Report | Manguxi 40' |

Stade de Beaumer, Moroni
Referee: Parmendra Nunkoo (Mauritius)
28 February 2015
19:00 UTC+1

| Petro de Luanda (Angola) | 4–0 | (Comoros) Volcan Club |
|---|---|---|
| Carlinhos 8'; Job 46' (pen.); Mateus 68'; Mabululu 71' | Report |

Estádio 11 de Novembro, Luanda
Referee: Diosdado Nzibi (Equatorial Guinea)

Petro de Luanda won 5–0 on aggregate.

14 February 2015
18:00 UTC+2

| Bidvest Wits (South Africa) | 3–0 | (Eswatini) Royal Leopards |
|---|---|---|
| Motshwari 45'; Ngcobo 65', 70' | Report |

Bidvest Stadium, Johannesburg
Referee: Joshua Bondo (Botswana)
28 February 2015
15:30 UTC+2

| Royal Leopards (Eswatini) | 3–0 | (South Africa) Bidvest Wits |
|---|---|---|
| Dlamini 16'; Nxumalo 62' (pen.); Thwala 76' | Report |
Penalties
| Nxumalo (penalty scored); Sibandze (penalty scored); Ntimane (penalty scored); Lukhele (penalty missed); Dlamini (penalty scored); Malambe (penalty scored); Mkhontfo (penalty scored); Thwala (penalty scored) | 7–6 | (penalty missed) Ngcobo; (penalty scored) Kwakman; (penalty scored) Nergadze; (penalty scored) Ntshangase; (penalty scored) Motshwari; (penalty scored) Lecki; (penalty scored) ? (penalty missed) Sekese |

Somhlolo National Stadium, Lobamba
Referee: Norman Matemera (Zimbabwe)

3–3 on aggregate. Royal Leopards won on penalties.

14 February 2015
15:30 UTC+4

| Petite Rivière Noire (Mauritius) | 1–2 | (Mozambique) Ferroviário da Beira |
|---|---|---|
| Bazerque 12' | Report | Vilanculos 68'; Nhambombe 78' (pen.) |

Stade George V, Curepipe
Referee: Nelson Fred (Seychelles)
1 March 2015
15:00 UTC+2

| Ferroviário da Beira (Mozambique) | 5–2 | (Mauritius) Petite Rivière Noire |
|---|---|---|
| Fernandes 1', 73'; Morais 37'; Bazerque 48' (o.g.); Mandava 65' | Report | Calambé 39', 89' |

Estádio do Ferroviário, Beira
Referee: Davies Omweno (Kenya)

Ferroviário da Beira won 7–3 on aggregate.

== First round ==
The first round included 32 teams: the 23 winners of the preliminary round, and the 9 teams that received byes to this round.

| Team 1 | Agg. | Team 2 | 1st leg | 2nd leg |
|---|---|---|---|---|
| Onze Créateurs (Mali) | 2–1 | (Niger) Sahel SC | 2–1 | 0–0 |
| ASEC Mimosas (Ivory Coast) | 3–2 | (Libya) Al-Ittihad | 1–1 | 2–1 |
| Djoliba (Mali) | 2–1 | (Egypt) Petrojet | 2–1 | 0–0 |
| Hearts of Oak (Ghana) | 5–3 | (Senegal) Olympique de Ngor | 2–1 | 3–2 |
| Horoya (Guinea) | 1–1 (3–5 p) | (Algeria) ASO Chlef | 1–0 | 0–1 |
| Club Africain (Tunisia) | w/o | (Nigeria) Dolphins | — | — |
| Warri Wolves (Nigeria) | 2–0 | (Ethiopia) Dedebit | 2–0 | 0–0 |
| Al-Ahly Shendi (Sudan) | 3–6 | (Democratic Republic of the Congo) MK Étanchéité | 2–1 | 1–5 |
| Zamalek (Egypt) | 6–1 | (Rwanda) Rayon Sports | 3–1 | 3–0 |
| FUS Rabat (Morocco) | 4–2 | AS Togo-Port | 3–0 | 1–2 |
| CF Mounana (Gabon) | 4–3 | (Zambia) Power Dynamos | 4–0 | 0–3 |
| Orlando Pirates (South Africa) | 4–3 | (Uganda) URA | 2–1 | 2–2 |
| Young Africans (Tanzania) | 5–2 | (Zimbabwe) FC Platinum | 5–1 | 0–1 |
| Étoile du Sahel (Tunisia) | 2–1 | (Angola) Benfica de Luanda | 1–0 | 1–1 |
| Royal Leopards (Eswatini) | 3–2 | (Angola) Petro de Luanda | 2–2 | 1–0 |
| AS Vita Club (Democratic Republic of the Congo) | 3–1 | (Mozambique) Ferroviário da Beira | 3–0 | 0–1 |

14 March 2015
17:00 UTC±0

| Onze Créateurs (Mali) | 2–1 | (Niger) Sahel SC |
|---|---|---|
| Sidibé 26'; Samaké 34' | Report | Ali 19' |

Stade Modibo Kéïta, Bamako
Referee: Falou Galasse Kane (Senegal)
4 April 2015
16:00 UTC+1

| Sahel SC (Niger) | 0–0 | (Mali) Onze Créateurs |
|---|---|---|
| | Report |

Stade Municipal, Niamey
Referee: Juste Ephrem Zio (Burkina Faso)

Onze Créateurs won 2–1 on aggregate.

15 March 2015
15:30 UTC±0

| ASEC Mimosas (Ivory Coast) | 1–1 | (Libya) Al-Ittihad |
|---|---|---|
| Zakri 43' | Report | Mohamed 72' |

Stade Félix Houphouët-Boigny, Abidjan
Referee: Yanissou Bebou (Togo)
4 April 2015
15:00 UTC+1

| Al-Ittihad (Libya) | 1–2 | (Ivory Coast) ASEC Mimosas |
|---|---|---|
| Mahfud 7' | Report | Mensah 19'; Zakri 88' |

Stade El Menzah, Tunis (Tunisia)
Referee: Youssef Essrayri (Tunisia)

Note: The second leg was played outside of Libya due to security concerns.
ASEC Mimosas won 2–1 on aggregate.

15 March 2015
16:00 UTC±0

| Djoliba (Mali) | 2–1 | (Egypt) Petrojet |
|---|---|---|
| Tounkara 15' (pen.); Sissoko 22' | Report | Gamal 42' |

Stade Modibo Kéïta, Bamako
Referee: Yakhouba Keita (Guinea)
4 April 2015
15:00 UTC+2

| Petrojet (Egypt) | 0–0 | (Mali) Djoliba |
|---|---|---|
| | Report |

Suez Stadium, Suez
Referee: Mutaz Khairalla (Sudan)

Djoliba won 2–1 on aggregate.

15 March 2015
15:00 UTC±0

| Hearts of Oak (Ghana) | 2–1 | (Senegal) Olympique de Ngor |
|---|---|---|
| Aguidi 63'; Fiamenyo 84' | Report | Fall 33' |

Accra Sports Stadium, Accra
Referee: Gomno Daouda (Niger)
4 April 2015
17:00 UTC±0

| Olympique de Ngor (Senegal) | 2–3 | (Ghana) Hearts of Oak |
|---|---|---|
| Gomis 8'; Sène 67' | Report | Kumi 59'; Gnagne 62' (pen.); Acquah 87' |

Stade Caroline Faye, M'Bour
Referee: Alhadi Mahamat (Chad)

Hearts of Oak won 5–3 on aggregate.

13 March 2015
17:00 UTC±0

| Horoya (Guinea) | 1–0 | (Algeria) ASO Chlef |
|---|---|---|
| B. Camara 90+5' (pen.) | Report |

Stade Modibo Kéïta, Bamako (Mali)
Referee: Akintoye Koole (Benin)
3 April 2015
18:00 UTC+1

| ASO Chlef (Algeria) | 1–0 | (Guinea) Horoya |
|---|---|---|
| Naâmani 50' | Report |
Penalties
| Tedjar (penalty scored); Kouakou (penalty scored); Boulahia (penalty scored); Naâmani (penalty scored); Semahi (penalty scored) | 5–3 | (penalty scored) A. Camara; (penalty missed) Baresi; (penalty scored) F. Camara; (penalty scored) Bangoura |

Stade Mohamed Boumezrag, Chlef
Referee: Mal Mohamadou (Cameroon)

Note: The first leg was played outside of Guinea due to Ebola outbreak.
1–1 on aggregate. ASO Chlef won on penalties.

14 March 2015
15:00 UTC+1

| Club Africain (Tunisia) | Cancelled | (Nigeria) Dolphins |
|---|---|---|
| | Report |

Stade Olympique de Radès, Tunis
Referee: Haileyesus Bazezew (Ethiopia)
5 April 2015
16:00 UTC+1

| Dolphins (Nigeria) | Cancelled | (Tunisia) Club Africain |
|---|---|---|
| | Report |

Liberation Stadium, Port Harcourt
Referee: Thierry Nkurunziza (Burundi)

Club Africain won on walkover after Dolphins did not arrive on time for the first leg.

14 March 2015
16:00 UTC+1

| Warri Wolves (Nigeria) | 2–0 | (Ethiopia) Dedebit |
|---|---|---|
| Oghenekaro 4'; Salami 79' (pen.) | Report |

Warri Township Stadium, Warri
Referee: Hassan Mohamed Hagi (Somalia)
5 April 2015
16:00 UTC+3

| Dedebit (Ethiopia) | 0–0 | (Nigeria) Warri Wolves |
|---|---|---|
| | Report |

Bahir Dar Stadium, Bahir Dar
Referee: Fidel Gomes (Guinea-Bissau)

Warri Wolves won 2–0 on aggregate.

13 March 2015
20:00 UTC+3

| Al-Ahly Shendi (Sudan) | 2–1 | (Democratic Republic of the Congo) MK Étanchéité |
|---|---|---|
| Elhussain 44'; Osunwa 52' | Report | Kadima 83' |

Shendi Stadium, Shendi
Referee: Bamlak Tessema Weyesa (Ethiopia)
3 April 2015
15:30 UTC+1

| MK Étanchéité (Democratic Republic of the Congo) | 5–1 | (Sudan) Al-Ahly Shendi |
|---|---|---|
| Kadima 3', 28'; Lusala 11'; Bofumbo 30'; Lwamba 48' | Report | Elhussain 38' |

Stade Tata Raphaël, Kinshasa
Referee: Joshua Bondo (Botswana)

MK Étanchéité won 6–3 on aggregate.

15 March 2015
14:45 UTC+2

| Zamalek (Egypt) | 3–1 | (Rwanda) Rayon Sports |
|---|---|---|
| Eid 6' (pen.), 45'; Imanishimwe 37' (o.g.) | Report | Muganza 53' |

El Gouna Stadium, El Gouna
Referee: Mohamed Benouza (Algeria)
5 April 2015
15:30 UTC+2

| Rayon Sports (Rwanda) | 0–3 | (Egypt) Zamalek |
|---|---|---|
| | Report | Eid 33'; Gabr 53'; Salah 56' |

Amahoro Stadium, Kigali
Referee: Brian Miiro (Uganda)

Zamalek won 6–1 on aggregate.

13 March 2015
19:30 UTC±0

| FUS Rabat (Morocco) | 3–0 | AS Togo-Port |
|---|---|---|
| Batna 20', 69'; Njie 52' | Report |

Stade de FUS, Rabat
Referee: Boubou Traoré (Mali)
5 April 2015
15:00 UTC±0

| AS Togo-Port | 2–1 | (Morocco) FUS Rabat |
|---|---|---|
| Tchatakoura 86', 89' | Report | Fouzair 27' |

Stade Municipal, Lomé
Referee: Joseph Lamptey (Ghana)

FUS Rabat won 4–2 on aggregate.

15 March 2015
15:30 UTC+1

| CF Mounana (Gabon) | 4–0 | (Zambia) Power Dynamos |
|---|---|---|
| Ambourouet 16' (pen.); Biyoghe 46', 52'; Djako 77' | Report |

Stade Augustin Monédan de Sibang, Libreville
Referee: Duncan Lengani (Malawi)
4 April 2015
15:00 UTC+2

| Power Dynamos (Zambia) | 3–0 | (Gabon) CF Mounana |
|---|---|---|
| Mubanga 29'; Ngonga 68'; Munthali 90' | Report |

Arthur Davies Stadium, Kitwe
Referee: Lazard Tsiba (Congo)

CF Mounana won 4–3 on aggregate.

14 March 2015
17:00 UTC+2

| Orlando Pirates (South Africa) | 2–1 | (Uganda) URA |
|---|---|---|
| Mahamutsa 4'; Majoro 85' | Report | Lwasa 90+3' |

Orlando Stadium, Johannesburg
Referee: Ruzive Ruzive (Zimbabwe)
4 April 2015
16:00 UTC+3

| URA (Uganda) | 2–2 | (South Africa) Orlando Pirates |
|---|---|---|
| Mugerwa 36'; Kalanda 88' | Report | Makola 53'; Manyisa 69' (pen.) |

Mandela National Stadium, Kampala
Referee: Eric Otogo-Castane (Gabon)

Orlando Pirates won 4–3 on aggregate.

15 March 2015
16:00 UTC+3

| Young Africans (Tanzania) | 5–1 | (Zimbabwe) FC Platinum |
|---|---|---|
| Telela 31'; Niyonzima 42'; Tambwe 46'; Ngasa 52', 90' | Report | Musona 45' |

National Stadium, Dar es Salaam
Referee: Djamal Aden (Djibouti)
4 April 2015
15:00 UTC+2

| FC Platinum (Zimbabwe) | 1–0 | (Tanzania) Young Africans |
|---|---|---|
| Musona 30' | Report |

Mandava Stadium, Zvishavane
Referee: Hélder Martins de Carvalho (Angola)

Young Africans won 5–2 on aggregate.

14 March 2015
15:30 UTC+1

| Étoile du Sahel (Tunisia) | 1–0 | (Angola) Benfica de Luanda |
|---|---|---|
| Mouihbi 53' (pen.) | Report |

Stade Olympique de Sousse, Sousse
Referee: Mahmoud Ashour (Egypt)
5 April 2015
15:00 UTC+1

| Benfica de Luanda (Angola) | 1–1 | (Tunisia) Étoile du Sahel |
|---|---|---|
| Hélio 34' (pen.) | Report | Bounedjah 6' |

Estádio dos Coqueiros, Luanda
Referee: Bernard Camille (Seychelles)

Étoile du Sahel won 2–1 on aggregate.

14 March 2015
15:30 UTC+2

| Royal Leopards (Eswatini) | 2–2 | (Angola) Petro de Luanda |
|---|---|---|
| Nxumalo 35' (pen.); Gama 53' | Report | Mabululu 5'; Filhão 75' |

Somhlolo National Stadium, Lobamba
Referee: Osiase Koto (Lesotho)
5 April 2015
16:00 UTC+1

| Petro de Luanda (Angola) | 0–1 | (Eswatini) Royal Leopards |
|---|---|---|
| | Report | Mkhontfo 54' |

Estádio 11 de Novembro, Luanda
Referee: Wellington Kaoma (Zambia)

Royal Leopards won 3–2 on aggregate.

15 March 2015
15:30 UTC+1

| AS Vita Club (Democratic Republic of the Congo) | 3–0 | (Mozambique) Ferroviário da Beira |
|---|---|---|
| Mubele 1', 86'; Mpumbu 67' (pen.) | Report |

Stade Tata Raphaël, Kinshasa
Referee: Diosdado Nzibi (Equatorial Guinea)
5 April 2015
15:00 UTC+2

| Ferroviário da Beira (Mozambique) | 1–0 | (Democratic Republic of the Congo) AS Vita Club |
|---|---|---|
| Jacob 74' | Report |

Estádio do Ferroviário, Beira
Referee: Mbongseni Fakudze (Swaziland)

AS Vita Club won 3–1 on aggregate.

== Second round ==
The second round included the 16 winners of the first round.

| Team 1 | Agg. | Team 2 | 1st leg | 2nd leg |
|---|---|---|---|---|
| Onze Créateurs (Mali) | 0–3 | (Ivory Coast) ASEC Mimosas | 0–1 | 0–2 |
| Djoliba (Mali) | 2–2 (a) | (Ghana) Hearts of Oak | 1–2 | 1–0 |
| ASO Chlef (Algeria) | 1–2 | (Tunisia) Club Africain | 1–1 | 0–1 |
| Warri Wolves (Nigeria) | 3–1 | (Democratic Republic of the Congo) MK Étanchéité | 2–1 | 1–0 |
| Zamalek (Egypt) | 3–2 | (Morocco) FUS Rabat | 0–0 | 3–2 |
| CF Mounana (Gabon) | 2–5 | (South Africa) Orlando Pirates | 2–2 | 0–3 |
| Young Africans (Tanzania) | 1–2 | (Tunisia) Étoile du Sahel | 1–1 | 0–1 |
| Royal Leopards (Eswatini) | 2–4 | (Democratic Republic of the Congo) AS Vita Club | 1–0 | 1–4 |

19 April 2015
17:00 UTC±0

| Onze Créateurs (Mali) | 0–1 | (Ivory Coast) ASEC Mimosas |
|---|---|---|
| | Report | Ba Loua 90' |

Stade Modibo Kéïta, Bamako
Referee: Néant Alioum (Cameroon)
3 May 2015
15:30 UTC±0

| ASEC Mimosas (Ivory Coast) | 2–0 | (Mali) Onze Créateurs |
|---|---|---|
| Soumahoro 11'; Touré 88' | Report |

Stade Robert Champroux, Abidjan
Referee: Joshua Amao (Nigeria)

ASEC Mimosas won 3–0 on aggregate.

17 April 2015
17:00 UTC±0

| Djoliba (Mali) | 1–2 | (Ghana) Hearts of Oak |
|---|---|---|
| Diarra 73' (pen.) | Report | Fiamenyo 54'; Acquah 62' |

Stade Modibo Kéïta, Bamako
Referee: Thierry Nkurunziza (Burundi)
3 May 2015
15:00 UTC±0

| Hearts of Oak (Ghana) | 0–1 | (Mali) Djoliba |
|---|---|---|
| | Report | Diallo 85' |

Accra Sports Stadium, Accra
Referee: Mohamed Ragab Omar (Libya)

2–2 on aggregate. Hearts of Oak won on away goals.

17 April 2015
18:00 UTC+1

| ASO Chlef (Algeria) | 1–1 | (Tunisia) Club Africain |
|---|---|---|
| Kouakou 85' | Report | Khalifa 64' |

Stade Mohamed Boumezrag, Chlef
Referee: Bienvenu Sinko (Ivory Coast)
1 May 2015
18:00 UTC+1

| Club Africain (Tunisia) | 1–0 | (Algeria) ASO Chlef |
|---|---|---|
| Meniaoui 43' | Report |

Stade Olympique de Radès, Tunis
Attendance: 18,300
Referee: Hagi Wiish (Somalia)

Club Africain won 2–1 on aggregate.

18 April 2015
16:00 UTC+1

| Warri Wolves (Nigeria) | 2–1 | (Democratic Republic of the Congo) MK Étanchéité |
|---|---|---|
| Salami 6', 70' | Report | Lwamba 79' |

Warri Township Stadium, Warri
Referee: Bernard Camille (Seychelles)
1 May 2015
15:30 UTC+1

| MK Étanchéité (Democratic Republic of the Congo) | 0–1 | (Nigeria) Warri Wolves |
|---|---|---|
| | Report | Oghenekaro 71' |

Stade Tata Raphaël, Kinshasa
Referee: Aurélien Juenkou (Cameroon)

Warri Wolves won 3–1 on aggregate.

19 April 2015
19:00 UTC+2

| Zamalek (Egypt) | 0–0 | (Morocco) FUS Rabat |
|---|---|---|
| | Report |

Suez Stadium, Suez
Referee: Ali Lemghaifry (Mauritania)
3 May 2015
20:30 UTC+1

| FUS Rabat (Morocco) | 2–3 | (Egypt) Zamalek |
|---|---|---|
| Saâdane 40'; Batna 72' | Report | Morsi 15'; Gaber 84'; Emam 90' |

Stade de FUS, Rabat
Referee: Youssef Essrayri (Tunisia)

Zamalek won 3–2 on aggregate.

19 April 2015
15:30 UTC+1

| CF Mounana (Gabon) | 2–2 | (South Africa) Orlando Pirates |
|---|---|---|
| Ouédraogo 32'; Ambourouet 50' (pen.) | Report | Majoro 75'; Rakhale 80' |

Stade Augustin Monédan de Sibang, Libreville
Referee: Hamada Nampiandraza (Madagascar)
2 May 2015
20:15 UTC+2

| Orlando Pirates (South Africa) | 3–0 | (Gabon) CF Mounana |
|---|---|---|
| Erasmus 23', 28', 56' | Report |

Orlando Stadium, Johannesburg
Referee: Davies Omweno (Kenya)

Orlando Pirates won 5–2 on aggregate.

18 April 2015
16:00 UTC+3

| Young Africans (Tanzania) | 1–1 | (Tunisia) Étoile du Sahel |
|---|---|---|
| Haroub 3' (pen.) | Report | Ben Amor 47' |

National Stadium, Dar es Salaam
Referee: Samuel Chirindza (Mozambique)
2 May 2015
19:00 UTC+1

| Étoile du Sahel (Tunisia) | 1–0 | (Tanzania) Young Africans |
|---|---|---|
| Jemal 24' | Report |

Stade Olympique de Sousse, Sousse
Referee: Denis Batte (Uganda)

Étoile du Sahel won 2–1 on aggregate.

18 April 2015
15:30 UTC+2

| Royal Leopards (Eswatini) | 1–0 | (Democratic Republic of the Congo) AS Vita Club |
|---|---|---|
| Mkhontfo 45' | Report |

Somhlolo National Stadium, Lobamba
Referee: Hélder Martins de Carvalho (Angola)
3 May 2015
15:30 UTC+1

| AS Vita Club (Democratic Republic of the Congo) | 4–1 | (Eswatini) Royal Leopards |
|---|---|---|
| Ngudikama 8'; Lusadisu 45'; Mubele 57', 71' | Report | Malambe 86' |

Stade Tata Raphaël, Kinshasa
Referee: Luelseghed Ghebremichael (Eritrea)

AS Vita Club won 4–2 on aggregate.

== Play-off round ==
The play-off round included 16 teams: the eight winners of the Confederation Cup second round and the eight losers of the Champions League second round.

The draw for the play-off round was held on 5 May 2015, 11:00 UTC+2, at the CAF Headquarters in Cairo, Egypt. The winners of the Confederation Cup second round were drawn against the losers of the Champions League second round, with the former hosting the second leg. Four ties contained a seeded loser of the Champions League second round (Pot A) and an unseeded winner of the Confederation Cup second round (Pot B), and the other four ties contained a seeded winner of the Confederation Cup second round (Pot C) and an unseeded loser of the Champions League second round (Pot D). The seeding of each team was determined by their ranking points calculated based on performances in continental club championships for the period 2010–2014.

The following 16 teams were entered into the draw:

| Qualified from Confederation Cup | | Qualified from Champions League | |
| Seeded (Pot C) | Unseeded (Pot B) | Seeded (Pot A) | Unseeded (Pot D) |
|---|---|---|---|
| (Democratic Republic of the Congo) AS Vita Club (20 pts); (Egypt) Zamalek (16 pts); (South Africa) Orlando Pirates (16 pts); (Tunisia) Étoile du Sahel (9 pts) | (Ivory Coast) ASEC Mimosas (7 pts); (Tunisia) Club Africain (6 pts); (Ghana) Hearts of Oak (0 pt); (Nigeria) Warri Wolves (0 pt) | (Egypt) Al-Ahly (62 pts); (Tunisia) Espérance de Tunis (48 pts); (Tunisia) CS Sfaxien (34 pts); (Republic of the Congo) AC Léopards (26 pts) | (Mali) Stade Malien (11 pts); (Morocco) Raja Casablanca (2 pts); (Democratic Republic of the Congo) SM Sanga Balende (0 pt); (Guinea) AS Kaloum (0 pt) |

The eight winners of the play-off round advanced to the group stage.

| Team 1 | Agg. | Team 2 | 1st leg | 2nd leg |
|---|---|---|---|---|
| Al-Ahly (Egypt) | 3–3 (5–4 p) | (Tunisia) Club Africain | 2–1 | 1–2 |
| Espérance de Tunis (Tunisia) | 5–1 | (Ghana) Hearts of Oak | 4–0 | 1–1 |
| AC Léopards (Republic of the Congo) | 4–3 | (Nigeria) Warri Wolves | 3–0 | 1–3 |
| CS Sfaxien (Tunisia) | 3–1 | (Ivory Coast) ASEC Mimosas | 2–0 | 1–1 |
| Stade Malien (Mali) | 4–3 | (Democratic Republic of the Congo) AS Vita Club | 2–0 | 2–3 |
| AS Kaloum (Guinea) | 1–6 | (South Africa) Orlando Pirates | 0–2 | 1–4 |
| SM Sanga Balende (Democratic Republic of the Congo) | 2–3 | (Egypt) Zamalek | 1–0 | 1–3 |
| Raja Casablanca (Morocco) | 2–3 | (Tunisia) Étoile du Sahel | 2–0 | 0–3 |

17 May 2015
19:00 UTC+2

| Al-Ahly (Egypt) | 2–1 | (Tunisia) Club Africain |
|---|---|---|
| Abd El-Zaher 45+1'; Moteab 63' | Report | Meniaoui 35' |

Suez Stadium, Suez
Referee: Bamlak Tessema Weyesa (Ethiopia)
7 June 2015
18:00 UTC+1

| Club Africain (Tunisia) | 2–1 | (Egypt) Al-Ahly |
|---|---|---|
| Dhaouadi 7'; Ghandri 90' | Report | Moteab 60' |
Penalties
| Belaïd (penalty scored); Ifa (penalty scored); Dhaouadi (penalty scored); Agrebi (penalty missed); Mikari (penalty scored); Meniaoui (penalty missed); Jaziri (penalty missed) | 4–5 | (penalty scored) Said; (penalty scored) Soliman; (penalty scored) Ashour; (penalty missed) Nagieb; (penalty scored) Samir; (penalty missed) Raheel; (penalty scored) Sobhi |

Stade Olympique de Radès, Tunis
Referee: Mehdi Abid Charef (Algeria)

3–3 on aggregate. Al-Ahly won on penalties (advanced to Group A).

17 May 2015
18:00 UTC+1

| Espérance de Tunis (Tunisia) | 4–0 | (Ghana) Hearts of Oak |
|---|---|---|
| Eduok 12', 58'; Afful 74'; Chaalali 80' | Report |

Stade Olympique de Radès, Tunis
Referee: Gehad Grisha (Egypt)
6 June 2015
15:00 UTC±0

| Hearts of Oak (Ghana) | 1–1 | (Tunisia) Espérance de Tunis |
|---|---|---|
| Mensah 3' | Report | Naghmouchi 89' |

Accra Sports Stadium, Accra
Referee: Bakary Gassama (Gambia)

Espérance de Tunis won 5–1 on aggregate (advanced to Group A).

17 May 2015
15:30 UTC+1

| AC Léopards (Republic of the Congo) | 3–0 | (Nigeria) Warri Wolves |
|---|---|---|
| Cissé 8'; Bakoua 25'; Lakolo 78' (pen.) | Report |

Stade Denis Sassou Nguesso, Dolisie
Referee: Joseph Lamptey (Ghana)
6 June 2015
16:00 UTC+1

| Warri Wolves (Nigeria) | 3–1 | (Republic of the Congo) AC Léopards |
|---|---|---|
| Salami 46', 74'; Egwuekwe 89' | Report | Egwuekwe 53' (o.g.) |

Warri Township Stadium, Warri
Referee: Bouchaïb El Ahrach (Morocco)

AC Léopards won 4–3 on aggregate (advanced to Group B).

16 May 2015
19:15 UTC+1

| CS Sfaxien (Tunisia) | 2–0 | (Ivory Coast) ASEC Mimosas |
|---|---|---|
| Maâloul 39'; Khenissi 78' | Report |

Stade Taïeb Mhiri, Sfax
Referee: Victor Gomes (South Africa)
7 June 2015
15:30 UTC±0

| ASEC Mimosas (Ivory Coast) | 1–1 | (Tunisia) CS Sfaxien |
|---|---|---|
| Soumahoro 13' | Report | Moncer 79' |

Stade Robert Champroux, Abidjan
Referee: Janny Sikazwe (Zambia)

CS Sfaxien won 3–1 on aggregate (advanced to Group B).

16 May 2015
17:00 UTC±0

| Stade Malien (Mali) | 2–0 | (Democratic Republic of the Congo) AS Vita Club |
|---|---|---|
| Cissé 5'; Koné 68' | Report |

Stade Modibo Kéïta, Bamako
Referee: Bernard Camille (Seychelles)
7 June 2015
15:30 UTC+1

| AS Vita Club (Democratic Republic of the Congo) | 3–2 | (Mali) Stade Malien |
|---|---|---|
| Mubele 4'; Kupa 63'; Dayo 81' (pen.) | Report | Cissé 15', 51' |

Stade Tata Raphaël, Kinshasa
Referee: Mohamed Said Kordi (Tunisia)

Stade Malien won 4–3 on aggregate (advanced to Group A).

15 May 2015
17:00 UTC±0

| AS Kaloum (Guinea) | 0–2 | (South Africa) Orlando Pirates |
|---|---|---|
| | Report | Gabuza 4'; Manyisa 72' |

Stade Modibo Kéïta, Bamako (Mali)
Referee: Ali Lemghaifry (Mauritania)
6 June 2015
15:00 UTC+2

| Orlando Pirates (South Africa) | 4–1 | (Guinea) AS Kaloum |
|---|---|---|
| Erasmus 22'; Gabuza 53', 59'; Myeni 76' | Report | Camara 46' |

Bidvest Stadium, Johannesburg
Referee: Néant Alioum (Cameroon)

Note: The first leg was played outside of Guinea due to Ebola outbreak.
Orlando Pirates won 6–1 on aggregate (advanced to Group B).

17 May 2015
15:30 UTC+2

| SM Sanga Balende (Democratic Republic of the Congo) | 1–0 | (Egypt) Zamalek |
|---|---|---|
| Ngoma 11' | Report |

Stade TP Mazembe, Lubumbashi
Referee: Malang Diedhiou (Senegal)
7 June 2015
21:00 UTC+2

| Zamalek (Egypt) | 3–1 | (Democratic Republic of the Congo) SM Sanga Balende |
|---|---|---|
| Hefny 49'; Gaber 64'; Kamar 77' | Report | Mpongo 65' |

Petro Sport Stadium, Cairo
Referee: Hamada Nampiandraza (Madagascar)

Zamalek won 3–2 on aggregate (advanced to Group B).

16 May 2015
19:00 UTC+1

| Raja Casablanca (Morocco) | 2–0 | (Tunisia) Étoile du Sahel |
|---|---|---|
| El Ouadi 23'; Osaguona 44' | Report |

Stade Mohamed V, Casablanca
Referee: Eric Otogo-Castane (Gabon)
7 June 2015
19:15 UTC+1

| Étoile du Sahel (Tunisia) | 3–0 | (Morocco) Raja Casablanca |
|---|---|---|
| Jemal 20'; Bounedjah 25'; Brigui 72' | Report |

Stade Olympique de Sousse, Sousse
Referee: Joshua Bondo (Botswana)

Étoile du Sahel won 3–2 on aggregate (advanced to Group A).
