= 2017 CAF Confederation Cup qualifying rounds =

- Dates: 10 February – 22 April 2017

The 2017 CAF Confederation Cup qualifying rounds were played from 10 February to 22 April 2017. A total of 68 teams competed in the international football qualifying rounds to decide the 16 places in the group stage of the 2017 CAF Confederation Cup.

== Draw ==
The draw for the preliminary round and first round was held on 21 December 2016 at the CAF headquarters in Cairo, Egypt.

The entry round of the 52 teams entered into the draw was determined by their performances in the CAF competitions for the previous five seasons (CAF 5-year ranking points shown in parentheses).

Entry round	First round (12 teams)	Preliminary round (40 teams)
Teams	(Tunisia) CS Sfaxien (21 pts); (Zambia) ZESCO United (15 pts); (Ivory Coast) ASEC Mimosas (8 pts); (Egypt) Smouha (4 pts); (Mali) Djoliba (3 pts); (Angola) Recreativo do Libolo (2 pts); (Sudan) Al-Ahly Shendi (1 pt); (Tunisia) Club Africain; (Democratic Republic of the Congo) SM Sanga Balende; (Mali) Onze Créateurs; (Guinea) AS Kaloum; (Tanzania) Azam	(Egypt) Al-Masry; (Democratic Republic of the Congo) Renaissance du Congo; (Algeria) JS Kabylie; (Algeria) MC Alger; (Sudan) Al-Hilal Al-Ubayyid; (South Africa) Platinum Stars; (South Africa) SuperSport United; (Republic of the Congo) Étoile du Congo; (Republic of the Congo) CARA Brazzaville; (Morocco) IR Tanger; (Morocco) MAS Fez; (Ivory Coast) SC Gagnoa; (Cameroon) Yong Sports Academy; (Cameroon) APEJES Academy; (Nigeria) Wikki Tourists; (Nigeria) Ifeanyi Ubah; (Ghana) Bechem United; (Libya) Al-Hilal Benghazi; (Ethiopia) Defence Force; (Botswana) Orapa United; (Burkina Faso) AS SONABEL; (Burundi) Le Messager Ngozi; (Comoros) Volcan Club; (Equatorial Guinea) Racing de Micomeseng; (Gabon) Akanda; (Kenya) Ulinzi Stars; (Liberia) Monrovia Club Breweries; (Madagascar) ASSM Elgeco Plus; (Mauritius) Pamplemousses; (Mozambique) UD Songo; (Niger) AS Douanes Niamey; (Rwanda) Rayon Sports; (Senegal) ASC Niarry Tally; (Seychelles) St Michel United; (Sierra Leone) RSLAF; (South Sudan) Wau Salaam; (Eswatini) Mbabane Swallows; (Uganda) Vipers; (Zanzibar) KVZ; (Zimbabwe) Ngezi Platinum

== Format ==
In the qualifying rounds, each tie was played on a home-and-away two-legged basis. If the aggregate score was tied after the second leg, the away goals rule would be applied, and if still tied, extra time would not be played, and the penalty shoot-out would be used to determine the winner (Regulations III. 13 & 14).

== Schedule ==
The schedule of each round was as follows.

Round	First leg	Second leg
Preliminary round	10–12 February 2017	17–19 February 2017
First round	10–12 March 2017	17–19 March 2017
Play-off round	7–9 April 2017	14–16 April 2017

== Bracket ==
The bracket of the draw was announced by the CAF on 21 December 2016. The 16 winners of the first round advanced to the play-off round, where they were joined by the 16 losers of the Champions League first round.

Preliminary round
1	(Republic of the Congo) Étoile du Congo	2	1	3
4	(Equatorial Guinea) Racing de Micomeseng	0	0	0
3	(Liberia) Monrovia Club Breweries	3	0	3
2	(Algeria) JS Kabylie	0	4	4

First round
(Republic of the Congo) Étoile du Congo	0	0	0
(Algeria) JS Kabylie	0	1	1

Preliminary round
1	(Mali) Djoliba	Bye
4
3	(Nigeria) Ifeanyi Ubah	1	0	1 (0 p)
2	(Egypt) Al-Masry	0	1	1 (3 p)

First round
(Mali) Djoliba	2	—
(Egypt) Al-Masry	0	—	w/o

Preliminary round
1	(Tunisia) CS Sfaxien	Bye
4
3	(Ethiopia) Defence Force	1	0	1
2	(Cameroon) Yong Sports Academy	0	2	2

First round
(Tunisia) CS Sfaxien	5	1	6
(Cameroon) Yong Sports Academy	0	1	1

Preliminary round
1	(Guinea) AS Kaloum	Bye
4
3	(Niger) AS Douanes Niamey	1	0	1
2	(Morocco) IR Tanger	2	1	3

First round
(Guinea) AS Kaloum	1	0	1
(Morocco) IR Tanger	0	3	3

Preliminary round
1	(Sudan) Al-Ahly Shendi	Bye
4
3	(Madagascar) ASSM Elgeco Plus	0	1	1
2	(South Africa) SuperSport United	0	2	2

First round
(Sudan) Al-Ahly Shendi	3	0	3
(South Africa) SuperSport United	2	4	6

Preliminary round
1	(Ghana) Bechem United	2	1	3
4	(Algeria) MC Alger	1	4	5
3	(Gabon) Akanda	0	0	0
2	(Democratic Republic of the Congo) Renaissance du Congo	0	1	1

First round
(Algeria) MC Alger	2	1	3
(Democratic Republic of the Congo) Renaissance du Congo	0	2	2

Preliminary round
1	(Tunisia) Club Africain	Bye
4
3	(Sierra Leone) RSLAF	2	0	2
2	(Nigeria) Wikki Tourists	0	1	1

First round
(Tunisia) Club Africain	9	—	w/o
(Sierra Leone) RSLAF	1	—

Preliminary round
1	(Uganda) Vipers	0	1	1 (a)
4	(Comoros) Volcan Club	0	1	1
3	(South Africa) Platinum Stars	1	1	2
2	(Mozambique) UD Songo	0	0	0

First round
(Uganda) Vipers	1	1	2
(South Africa) Platinum Stars	0	3	3

Preliminary round
1	(Tanzania) Azam	Bye
4
3	(Botswana) Orapa United	0	2	2
2	(Eswatini) Mbabane Swallows	1	3	4

First round
(Tanzania) Azam	1	0	1
(Eswatini) Mbabane Swallows	0	3	3

Preliminary round
1	(Zambia) ZESCO United	Bye
4
3	(Zanzibar) KVZ	2	0	2
2	(Burundi) Le Messager Ngozi	1	3	4

First round
(Zambia) ZESCO United	2	2	4
(Burundi) Le Messager Ngozi	0	2	2

Preliminary round
1	(Ivory Coast) ASEC Mimosas	Bye
4
3	(Cameroon) APEJES Academy	1	1	2 (a)
2	(Senegal) ASC Niarry Tally	0	2	2

First round
(Ivory Coast) ASEC Mimosas	2	0	2
(Cameroon) APEJES Academy	0	1	1

Preliminary round
1	(Mali) Onze Créateurs	Bye
4
3	(South Sudan) Wau Salaam	0	0	0
2	(Rwanda) Rayon Sports	4	2	6

First round
(Mali) Onze Créateurs	1	—
(Rwanda) Rayon Sports	0	—	w/o

Preliminary round
1	(Morocco) MAS Fez	3	0	3
4	(Republic of the Congo) CARA Brazzaville	0	2	2
3	(Burkina Faso) AS SONABEL	0	0	0
2	(Ivory Coast) SC Gagnoa	0	3	3

First round
(Morocco) MAS Fez	3	0	3
(Ivory Coast) SC Gagnoa	1	1	1

Preliminary round
1	(Angola) Recreativo do Libolo	Bye
4
3	(Mauritius) Pamplemousses	1	0	1
2	(Zimbabwe) Ngezi Platinum	1	1	2

First round
(Angola) Recreativo do Libolo	2	0	2
(Zimbabwe) Ngezi Platinum	1	0	1

Preliminary round
1	(Democratic Republic of the Congo) SM Sanga Balende	Bye
4
3	(Sudan) Al-Hilal Al-Ubayyid	2	1	3
2	(Seychelles) St Michel United	0	0	0

First round
(Democratic Republic of the Congo) SM Sanga Balende	1	0	1 (3 p)
(Sudan) Al-Hilal Al-Ubayyid	0	1	1 (5 p)

Preliminary round
1	(Egypt) Smouha	Bye
4
3	(Libya) Al-Hilal Benghazi	1	0	1 (4 p)
2	(Kenya) Ulinzi Stars	0	1	1 (5 p)

First round
(Egypt) Smouha	4	0	4
(Kenya) Ulinzi Stars	0	3	3

== Preliminary round ==
The preliminary round included the 40 teams that did not receive byes to the first round.

Team 1	Agg.	Team 2	1st leg	2nd leg
Monrovia Club Breweries (Liberia)	3–4	(Algeria) JS Kabylie	3–0	0–4
Étoile du Congo (Republic of the Congo)	3–0	(Equatorial Guinea) Racing de Micomeseng	2–0	1–0
Ifeanyi Ubah (Nigeria)	1–1 (0–3 p)	(Egypt) Al-Masry	1–0	0–1
Defence Force (Ethiopia)	1–2	(Cameroon) Yong Sports Academy	1–0	0–2
AS Douanes Niamey (Niger)	1–3	(Morocco) IR Tanger	1–2	0–1
ASSM Elgeco Plus (Madagascar)	1–2	(South Africa) SuperSport United	0–0	1–2
Akanda (Gabon)	0–1	(Democratic Republic of the Congo) Renaissance du Congo	0–0	0–1
Bechem United (Ghana)	3–5	(Algeria) MC Alger	2–1	1–4
RSLAF (Sierra Leone)	2–1	(Nigeria) Wikki Tourists	2–0	0–1
Platinum Stars (South Africa)	2–0	(Mozambique) UD Songo	1–0	1–0
Vipers (Uganda)	1–1 (a)	(Comoros) Volcan Club	0–0	1–1
Orapa United (Botswana)	2–4	(Eswatini) Mbabane Swallows	0–1	2–3
KVZ (Zanzibar)	2–4	(Burundi) Le Messager Ngozi	2–1	0–3
APEJES Academy (Cameroon)	2–2 (a)	(Senegal) ASC Niarry Tally	1–0	1–2
Wau Salaam (South Sudan)	0–6	(Rwanda) Rayon Sports	0–4	0–2
AS SONABEL (Burkina Faso)	0–3	(Ivory Coast) SC Gagnoa	0–0	0–3
MAS Fez (Morocco)	3–2	(Republic of the Congo) CARA Brazzaville	3–0	0–2
Pamplemousses (Mauritius)	1–2	(Zimbabwe) Ngezi Platinum	1–1	0–1
Al-Hilal Al-Ubayyid (Sudan)	3–0	(Seychelles) St Michel United	2–0	1–0
Al-Hilal Benghazi (Libya)	1–1 (4–5 p)	(Kenya) Ulinzi Stars	1–0	0–1

10 February 2017
16:00 UTC+0

Monrovia Club Breweries (Liberia)	3–0	(Algeria) JS Kabylie
Mulbah 58'; Sarkoh 79'; Andrews 90+1'	Report

Antoinette Tubman Stadium, Monrovia
Referee: Baba Leno (Guinea)
19 February 2017
18:00 UTC+1

JS Kabylie (Algeria)	4–0	(Liberia) Monrovia Club Breweries
Boulaouidet 23' (pen.), 62'; Berchiche 27'; Mebarki 73'	Report

Stade du 1er Novembre 1954, Tizi Ouzou
Referee: Nasrallah Jaouadi (Tunisia)

JS Kabylie won 4–3 on aggregate.

11 February 2017
15:30 UTC+1

Étoile du Congo (Republic of the Congo)	2–0	(Equatorial Guinea) Racing de Micomeseng
Akoli 37'; Ondzani 70'	Report

Stade Alphonse Massemba-Débat, Brazzaville
Referee: Esterline Gonçalves Género (São Tomé and Príncipe)
19 February 2017
17:00 UTC+1

Racing de Micomeseng (Equatorial Guinea)	0–1	(Republic of the Congo) Étoile du Congo
	Report	Mbo 65'

Estadio de Bata, Bata
Referee: Abdullahi Shuaibu (Nigeria)

Étoile du Congo won 3–0 on aggregate.

12 February 2017
16:00 UTC+1

Ifeanyi Ubah (Nigeria)	1–0	(Egypt) Al-Masry
Tamen 85'	Report

Ifeanyi Ubah Stadium, Nnewi
Referee: Maudo Jallow (Gambia)
19 February 2017
19:00 UTC+2

Al-Masry (Egypt)	1–0	(Nigeria) Ifeanyi Ubah
Shoukry 24' (pen.)	Report
Penalties
Azab (penalty scored); Mourad (penalty scored); Shoukry (penalty scored)	3–0	(penalty missed) Elu; (penalty missed) Tamen; (penalty missed) Osanga

Ismailia Stadium, Ismailia
Attendance: 7,000
Referee: Esam Al Jahani (Libya)

1–1 on aggregate. Al-Masry won 3–0 on penalties.

12 February 2017
16:00 UTC+3

Defence Force (Ethiopia)	1–0	(Cameroon) Yong Sports Academy
Addis 43'	Report

Addis Ababa Stadium, Addis Ababa
Referee: Abdoul Karim Twagirumukiza (Rwanda)
18 February 2017
15:30 UTC+1

Yong Sports Academy (Cameroon)	2–0	(Ethiopia) Defence Force
Nsangue 45+3'; Ngombe 81'	Report

Stade de la Réunification, Douala
Referee: Fabrice Nguembi Boulingui (Gabon)

Yong Sports Academy won 2–1 on aggregate.

11 February 2017
16:00 UTC+1

AS Douanes Niamey (Niger)	1–2	(Morocco) IR Tanger
Sacko 5'	Report	El Helali 24'; Šipović 58'

Stade Général-Seyni-Kountché, Niamey
Referee: Abou Coulibaly (Ivory Coast)
19 February 2017
19:00 UTC+0

IR Tanger (Morocco)	1–0	(Niger) AS Douanes Niamey
Benlamalem 89'	Report

Grand Stade de Tanger, Tangier
Referee: Lotfi Bekouassa (Algeria)

IR Tanger won 3–1 on aggregate.

12 February 2017
14:30 UTC+3

ASSM Elgeco Plus (Madagascar)	0–0	(South Africa) SuperSport United
	Report

Stade Municipal de Mahamasina, Antananarivo
Referee: Kutlwano Leso (Botswana)
19 February 2017
15:30 UTC+2

SuperSport United (South Africa)	2–1	(Madagascar) ASSM Elgeco Plus
Brockie 14' (pen.); Lakay 38'	Report	Raveloarisona 29'

Lucas Masterpieces Moripe Stadium, Pretoria
Referee: Pilan Ncube (Zimbabwe)

SuperSport United won 2–1 on aggregate.

10 February 2017
16:00 UTC+1

Akanda (Gabon)	0–0	(Democratic Republic of the Congo) Renaissance du Congo
	Report

Stade de l'Amitié, Libreville
Referee: Mal Mohamadou (Cameroon)
17 February 2017
15:30 UTC+1

Renaissance du Congo (Democratic Republic of the Congo)	1–0	(Gabon) Akanda
Ducapel 53' (pen.)	Report

Stade des Martyrs, Kinshasa
Referee: Georges Gatogato (Burundi)

Renaissance du Congo won 1–0 on aggregate.

12 February 2017
15:00 UTC+0

Bechem United (Ghana)	2–1	(Algeria) MC Alger
Touré 47' (pen.); Bonsu 75'	Report	Seguer 64'

Accra Sports Stadium, Accra
Referee: Boureima Sanogo (Burkina Faso)
18 February 2017
20:30 UTC+1

MC Alger (Algeria)	4–1	(Ghana) Bechem United
Seguer 1'; Hachoud 39', 84' (pen.); Mansouri 87' (pen.)	Report	Acheampong 59'

Stade du 5 Juillet 1962, Algiers
Referee: Adil Zourak (Morocco)

MC Alger won 5–3 on aggregate.

12 February 2017
16:30 UTC+0

RSLAF (Sierra Leone)	2–0	(Nigeria) Wikki Tourists
Kabba 16'; Sillah 25'	Report

National Stadium, Freetown
Referee: Daouda Guèye (Senegal)
19 February 2017
16:00 UTC+1

Wikki Tourists (Nigeria)	1–0	(Sierra Leone) RSLAF
Ibrahim 59' (pen.)	Report

Abubakar Tafawa Balewa Stadium, Bauchi
Referee: Boubou Traoré (Mali)

RSLAF won 2–1 on aggregate.

11 February 2017
20:00 UTC+2

Platinum Stars (South Africa)	1–0	(Mozambique) UD Songo
Ng'ambi 62'	Report

Royal Bafokeng Stadium, Rustenburg
Referee: Allister Barra (Seychelles)
18 February 2017
18:00 UTC+2

UD Songo (Mozambique)	0–1	(South Africa) Platinum Stars
	Report	Mabena 80'

Estádio do Zimpeto, Maputo
Referee: Hélder Martins de Carvalho (Angola)

Platinum Stars won 2–0 on aggregate.

11 February 2017
16:00 UTC+3

Vipers (Uganda)	0–0	(Comoros) Volcan Club
	Report

Mandela National Stadium, Kira
Referee: Idris Mehammed Osman (Eritrea)
18 February 2017
15:00 UTC+3

Volcan Club (Comoros)	1–1	(Uganda) Vipers
Djabir 14'	Report	Bukenya 28'

Stade de Moroni, Moroni
Referee: Stanley Hachiwa (Zambia)

1–1 on aggregate. Vipers won on away goals.

11 February 2017
20:00 UTC+2

Orapa United (Botswana)	0–1	(Eswatini) Mbabane Swallows
	Report	Nhleko 73'

Francistown Stadium, Francistown
Referee: Ganesh Chutooree (Mauritius)
18 February 2017
16:00 UTC+2

Mbabane Swallows (Eswatini)	3–2	(Botswana) Orapa United
Tsabedze 45+12' (pen.); Sikhondze 84'; Tshishimbi 90+3'	Report	Maswena 28'; Njobvu 77'

Somhlolo National Stadium, Lobamba
Referee: Jonas Shongedi (Namibia)

Mbabane Swallows won 4–2 on aggregate.

12 February 2017
16:30 UTC+3

KVZ (Zanzibar)	2–1	(Burundi) Le Messager Ngozi
Abdi 39' (pen.); Juma 43'	Report	Sabumukama 13' (pen.)

Amaan Stadium, Zanzibar City
Referee: Mutaz Khairalla (Sudan)
18 February 2017
15:00 UTC+2

Le Messager Ngozi (Burundi)	3–0	(Zanzibar) KVZ
Hakizimana 29'; Ramadhan 80'; Bayizere 90+1'	Report

Prince Louis Rwagasore Stadium, Bujumbura
Referee: Ring Nyier Akech Malong (South Sudan)

Le Messager Ngozi won 4–2 on aggregate.

12 February 2017
15:30 UTC+1

APEJES Academy (Cameroon)	1–0	(Senegal) ASC Niarry Tally
Sow 82' (o.g.)	Report

Stade Ahmadou Ahidjo, Yaoundé
Referee: Messie Nkounkou (Congo)
18 February 2017
16:30 UTC+0

ASC Niarry Tally (Senegal)	2–1	(Cameroon) APEJES Academy
N'Diaye 70'; Goudiaby 83'	Report	Acha 65'

Stade Demba Diop, Dakar
Referee: Abderahmane Kelly (Mauritania)

2–2 on aggregate. APEJES Academy won on away goals.

11 February 2017
16:30 UTC+3

Wau Salaam (South Sudan)	0–4	(Rwanda) Rayon Sports
	Report	Kwizera 53', 66'; Bayama 76'; Camara 87'

Juba Stadium, Juba
Referee: Amanuel Eyob (Eritrea)
19 February 2017
15:30 UTC+2

Rayon Sports (Rwanda)	2–0	(South Sudan) Wau Salaam
Kwizera 27'; Camara 82'	Report

Amahoro Stadium, Kigali
Referee: Haileyesus Bazezew (Ethiopia)

Rayon Sports won 6–0 on aggregate.

12 February 2017
16:00 UTC+0

AS SONABEL (Burkina Faso)	0–0	(Ivory Coast) SC Gagnoa
	Report

Stade du 4 Août, Ouagadougou
Referee: Ousmane Camara (Guinea)
18 February 2017
15:30 UTC+0

SC Gagnoa (Ivory Coast)	3–0	(Burkina Faso) AS SONABEL
Amon 16'; Bagaté 50'; Toh 90+1'	Report

Stade Robert Champroux, Abidjan
Referee: Kokou Ognankotan Ntale (Togo)

SC Gagnoa won 3–0 on aggregate.

11 February 2017
19:00 UTC+0

MAS Fez (Morocco)	3–0	(Republic of the Congo) CARA Brazzaville
Boua 21'; Djédjé 26', 66'	Report

Fez Stadium, Fez
Referee: Mahmoud Bassiouny (Egypt)
18 February 2017
15:30 UTC+1

CARA Brazzaville (Republic of the Congo)	2–0	(Morocco) MAS Fez
Kabangu 7'; Itoua 60'	Report

Stade Alphonse Massemba-Débat, Brazzaville
Referee: Etienne Gabato (Central African Republic)

MAS Fez won 3–2 on aggregate.

12 February 2017
15:30 UTC+4

Pamplemousses (Mauritius)	1–1	(Zimbabwe) Ngezi Platinum
Razah 35'	Report	Chakoroma 9' (pen.)

Stade Anjalay, Belle Vue Maurel
Referee: Christopher Harrison (South Africa)
18 February 2017
14:00 UTC+2

Ngezi Platinum (Zimbabwe)	1–0	(Mauritius) Pamplemousses
Dzvukamanja 18'	Report

National Sports Stadium, Harare
Referee: Ishmael Chizinga (Malawi)

Ngezi Platinum won 2–1 on aggregate.

10 February 2017
19:30 UTC+3

Al-Hilal Al-Ubayyid (Sudan)	2–0	(Seychelles) St Michel United
Ishag 27'; Abdelraheem 67'	Report

Al-Ubayyid Stadium, Al-Ubayyid
Referee: Mfaume Ali Nassoro (Tanzania)
18 February 2017
16:30 UTC+4

St Michel United (Seychelles)	0–1	(Sudan) Al-Hilal Al-Ubayyid
	Report	Abdelraheem 51'

Stade Linité, Victoria
Referee: Hubert Andriamiharisoa (Madagascar)

Al-Hilal Al-Ubayyid won 3–0 on aggregate.

10 February 2017
16:00 UTC+2

Al-Hilal Benghazi (Libya)	1–0	(Kenya) Ulinzi Stars
Al-Abbar 47'	Report

Al-Salam Stadium, Cairo (Egypt) (Note: Teams from Libya were not allowed to host their home matches in their country due to security concerns.)
Referee: Haythem Guirat (Tunisia)
18 February 2017
15:00 UTC+3

Ulinzi Stars (Kenya)	1–0	(Libya) Al-Hilal Benghazi
Onyango 17'	Report
Penalties
Wamalwa (penalty scored); Oketch (penalty scored); Ochieng (penalty missed); Onyango (penalty scored); Makwatta (penalty scored); Mbongi (penalty scored)	5–4	(penalty scored) Al Badri; (penalty scored) Sanogo; (penalty missed) Al-Shaafi; (penalty scored) Maetouq; (penalty scored) Al-Amami; (penalty missed) Al-Amshi

Moi International Sports Centre, Nairobi
Referee: Kabanga Yannick Malala (DR Congo)

1–1 on aggregate. Ulinzi Stars won 5–4 on penalties.

== First round ==
The first round included 32 teams: the 20 winners of the preliminary round, and the 12 teams that received byes to this round.

Team 1	Agg.	Team 2	1st leg	2nd leg
Étoile du Congo (Republic of the Congo)	0–1	(Algeria) JS Kabylie	0–0	0–1
Djoliba (Mali)	w/o (Note: FIFA suspended the Malian Football Federation on 17 March 2017. As a result, both Djoliba and Onze Créateurs could not play the second leg, and their opponents Al-Masry and Rayon Sports won on walkover.)	(Egypt) Al-Masry	2–0	—
CS Sfaxien (Tunisia)	6–1	(Cameroon) Yong Sports Academy	5–0	1–1
AS Kaloum (Guinea)	1–3	(Morocco) IR Tanger	1–0	0–3
Al-Ahly Shendi (Sudan)	3–6	(South Africa) SuperSport United	3–2	0–4
MC Alger (Algeria)	3–2	(Democratic Republic of the Congo) Renaissance du Congo	2–0	1–2
Club Africain (Tunisia)	w/o (Note: Club Africain won on walkover after RSLAF withdrew prior to the second leg.)	(Sierra Leone) RSLAF	9–1	—
Vipers (Uganda)	2–3	(South Africa) Platinum Stars	1–0	1–3
Azam (Tanzania)	1–3	(Eswatini) Mbabane Swallows	1–0	0–3
ZESCO United (Zambia)	4–2	(Burundi) Le Messager Ngozi	2–0	2–2
ASEC Mimosas (Ivory Coast)	2–1	(Cameroon) APEJES Academy	2–0	0–1
Onze Créateurs (Mali)	w/o	(Rwanda) Rayon Sports	1–0	—
MAS Fez (Morocco)	3–2	(Ivory Coast) SC Gagnoa	3–1	0–1
Recreativo do Libolo (Angola)	2–1	(Zimbabwe) Ngezi Platinum	2–1	0–0
SM Sanga Balende (Democratic Republic of the Congo)	1–1 (3–5 p)	(Sudan) Al-Hilal Al-Ubayyid	1–0	0–1
Smouha (Egypt)	4–3	(Kenya) Ulinzi Stars	4–0	0–3

Notes:

11 March 2017
15:30 UTC+1

Étoile du Congo (Republic of the Congo)	0–0	(Algeria) JS Kabylie
	Report

Stade Alphonse Massemba-Débat, Brazzaville
Referee: Jean Marc Ganamandji (Central African Republic)
18 March 2017
18:00 UTC+1

JS Kabylie (Algeria)	1–0	(Republic of the Congo) Étoile du Congo
Boulaouidet 90'	Report

Stade du 1er Novembre 1954, Tizi Ouzou
Referee: Mohamed El Hanafy (Egypt)

JS Kabylie won 1–0 on aggregate.

12 March 2017
17:00 UTC+0

Djoliba (Mali)	2–0	(Egypt) Al-Masry
Diallo 15' (pen.); Maïga 44'	Report

Stade Modibo Kéïta, Bamako
Referee: Issa Sy (Senegal)
18 March 2017
19:00 UTC+2

Al-Masry (Egypt)	Cancelled	(Mali) Djoliba
	Report

Ismailia Stadium, Ismailia
Referee: Bouchaïb El Ahrach (Morocco)

Al-Masry won on walkover after FIFA suspended the Malian Football Federation on 17 March 2017.

11 March 2017
18:00 UTC+1

CS Sfaxien (Tunisia)	5–0	(Cameroon) Yong Sports Academy
Ndoye 9', 78'; Aouadhi 27' (pen.), 35' (pen.); Marzouki 61'	Report

Stade Taïeb Mhiri, Sfax
Referee: Mustapha Ghorbal (Algeria)
18 March 2017
15:00 UTC+1

Yong Sports Academy (Cameroon)	1–1	(Tunisia) CS Sfaxien
Asangwo 3'	Report	Meriah 74'

Stade de la Réunification, Douala
Referee: Daniel Laryea (Ghana)

CS Sfaxien won 6–1 on aggregate.

11 March 2017
16:30 UTC+0

AS Kaloum (Guinea)	1–0	(Morocco) IR Tanger
Sylla 25'	Report

Stade du 28 Septembre, Conakry
Referee: Abubakar Ago (Nigeria)
18 March 2017
17:00 UTC+0

IR Tanger (Morocco)	3–0	(Guinea) AS Kaloum
Hammoudan 35', 60', 67'	Report

Grand Stade de Tanger, Tangier
Referee: Fidel Gomes (Guinea-Bissau)

IR Tanger won 3–1 on aggregate.

12 March 2017
19:30 UTC+3

Al-Ahly Shendi (Sudan)	3–2	(South Africa) SuperSport United
Subahi 57' (pen.); Faisal 65'; Mozamil 81'	Report	Booysen 80'; Brockie 90'

Shendi Stadium, Shendi
Referee: Boubou Traoré (Mali)
19 March 2017
18:00 UTC+2

SuperSport United (South Africa)	4–0	(Sudan) Al-Ahly Shendi
Mashamaite 42'; Al-Hassan 45+2' (o.g.); Nkhatha 48'; Modiba 82'	Report

Lucas Masterpieces Moripe Stadium, Pretoria
Referee: Ahmad Imtehaz Heeralall (Mauritius)

SuperSport United won 6–3 on aggregate.

10 March 2017
20:45 UTC+1

MC Alger (Algeria)	2–0	(Democratic Republic of the Congo) Renaissance du Congo
Aouedj 56'; Bouhenna 81'	Report

Stade du 5 Juillet 1962, Algiers
Referee: Isaac Montgomery (Liberia)
17 March 2017
15:30 UTC+1

Renaissance du Congo (Democratic Republic of the Congo)	2–1	(Algeria) MC Alger
Asumani 7'; Ducapel 79'	Report	Kacem 50'

Stade des Martyrs, Kinshasa
Referee: Idris Mehammed Osman (Eritrea)

MC Alger won 3–2 on aggregate.

12 March 2017
16:00 UTC+1

Club Africain (Tunisia)	9–1	(Sierra Leone) RSLAF
Chenihi 3', 16' (pen.), 42', 51'; Ghandri 6'; Khalifa 63'; Darragi 71' (pen.); Jaziri 75'; Meniaoui 88'	Report	Sillah 53'

Stade Olympique de Radès, Tunis
Referee: Mehdi Abid Charef (Algeria)
19 March 2017
16:30 UTC+0

RSLAF (Sierra Leone)	Cancelled	(Tunisia) Club Africain
	Report

National Stadium, Freetown
Referee: Kokou Fagla (Togo)

Club Africain won on walkover after RSLAF withdrew prior to the second leg.

11 March 2017
16:00 UTC+3

Vipers (Uganda)	1–0	(South Africa) Platinum Stars
Karisa 46'	Report

St Mary's Stadium, Kampala
Referee: Osiase Koto (Lesotho)
18 March 2017
20:00 UTC+2

Platinum Stars (South Africa)	3–1	(Uganda) Vipers
Mzimela 1' (pen.), 90' (pen.); Mabena 32'	Report	Karisa 54'

Royal Bafokeng Stadium, Rustenburg
Referee: Mbongseni Fakudze (Swaziland)

Platinum Stars won 3–2 on aggregate.

12 March 2017
19:15 UTC+3

Azam (Tanzania)	1–0	(Eswatini) Mbabane Swallows
Singano 85'	Report

Chamazi Stadium, Dar es Salaam
Referee: Adissa Abdul Raphiou Ligali (Benin)
19 March 2017
15:30 UTC+2

Mbabane Swallows (Eswatini)	3–0	(Tanzania) Azam
Ndzinisa 40'; Nhleko 66'; Hlatjwako 74'	Report

Somhlolo National Stadium, Lobamba
Referee: Celso Alvação (Mozambique)

Mbabane Swallows won 3–1 on aggregate.

10 March 2017
17:00 UTC+2

ZESCO United (Zambia)	2–0	(Burundi) Le Messager Ngozi
Mwanza 32'; Mtonga 76'	Report

Levy Mwanawasa Stadium, Ndola
Referee: Norman Matemera (Zimbabwe)
18 March 2017
15:00 UTC+2

Le Messager Ngozi (Burundi)	2–2	(Zambia) ZESCO United
Sabumukama 49'; Nizigiyimana 85'	Report	Were 61'; Owino 90'

Prince Louis Rwagasore Stadium, Bujumbura
Referee: Dennis Nguluwe (Malawi)

ZESCO United won 4–2 on aggregate.

12 March 2017
16:00 UTC+0

ASEC Mimosas (Ivory Coast)	2–0	(Cameroon) APEJES Academy
Bancé 15' (pen.); Dosso 70'	Report

Stade Robert Champroux, Abidjan
Referee: Ferdinand Udoh (Nigeria)
19 March 2017
15:00 UTC+1

APEJES Academy (Cameroon)	1–0	(Ivory Coast) ASEC Mimosas
Mbekeli 86'	Report

Stade Ahmadou Ahidjo, Yaoundé
Referee: Alhadi Mahamat (Chad)

ASEC Mimosas won 2–1 on aggregate.

11 March 2017
17:00 UTC+0

Onze Créateurs (Mali)	1–0	(Rwanda) Rayon Sports
Samassékou 60'	Report

Stade Modibo Kéïta, Bamako
Referee: António Rodrigues (Cape Verde)
18 March 2017
15:30 UTC+2

Rayon Sports (Rwanda)	Cancelled	(Mali) Onze Créateurs
	Report

Amahoro Stadium, Kigali
Referee: Hassane Abdou (Niger)

Rayon Sports won on walkover after FIFA suspended the Malian Football Federation on 17 March 2017.

12 March 2017
19:00 UTC+0

MAS Fez (Morocco)	3–1	(Ivory Coast) SC Gagnoa
Djédjé 7' (pen.); Sektioui 44', 56'	Report	Koné 36'

Fez Stadium, Fez
Referee: Baba Leno (Guinea)
18 March 2017
15:00 UTC+0

SC Gagnoa (Ivory Coast)	1–0	(Morocco) MAS Fez
Nouwoklo 64'	Report

Stade Robert Champroux, Abidjan
Referee: Mandeng Cosmas (Cameroon)

MAS Fez won 3–2 on aggregate.

11 March 2017
15:00 UTC+1

Recreativo do Libolo (Angola)	2–1	(Zimbabwe) Ngezi Platinum
Fabrício 12', 62'	Report	Chakoroma 20'

Estádio Municipal de Calulo, Calulo
Referee: Wellington Kaoma (Zambia)
18 March 2017
14:00 UTC+2

Ngezi Platinum (Zimbabwe)	0–0	(Angola) Recreativo do Libolo
	Report

National Sports Stadium, Harare
Referee: Ali Adelaïd (Comoros)

Recreativo do Libolo won 2–1 on aggregate.

11 March 2017
15:30 UTC+2

SM Sanga Balende (Democratic Republic of the Congo)	1–0	(Sudan) Al-Hilal Al-Ubayyid
Kungemena 33'	Report

Stade Frederic Kibassa Maliba, Lubumbashi
Referee: Haileyesus Bazezew (Ethiopia)
19 March 2017
20:00 UTC+3

Al-Hilal Al-Ubayyid (Sudan)	1–0	(Democratic Republic of the Congo) SM Sanga Balende
Moukoro 33'	Report
Penalties
El Tahir (penalty scored); Ladzagla (penalty scored); Moukoro (penalty scored); Abd Allah (penalty scored); Koko (penalty scored)	5–3	(penalty missed) Apinda

Al-Ubayyid Stadium, Al-Ubayyid
Referee: Thierry Nkurunziza (Burundi)

1–1 on aggregate. Al-Hilal Al-Ubayyid won 5–3 on penalties.

10 March 2017
18:00 UTC+2

Smouha (Egypt)	4–0	(Kenya) Ulinzi Stars
Raouf 12'; Mohareb 26', 87'; Abdel Aziz 70'	Report

Borg El Arab Stadium, Alexandria
Referee: Mahmood Ali Mahmood Ismail (Sudan)
18 March 2017
15:00 UTC+3

Ulinzi Stars (Kenya)	3–0	(Egypt) Smouha
Onyango 10', 37'; Mbongi 70'	Report

Kenyatta Stadium, Machakos
Referee: Jean Claude Ishimwe (Rwanda)

Smouha won 4–3 on aggregate.

== Play-off round ==
The play-off round included 32 teams: the 16 winners of the Confederation Cup first round and the 16 losers of the Champions League first round. The draw for the play-off round was held on 21 March 2017, 11:00 EET (UTC+2), at the CAF Headquarters in Cairo, Egypt. The winners of the Confederation Cup first round were drawn against the losers of the Champions League first round, with the teams from the Confederation Cup hosting the second leg.

The 32 teams were seeded by their performances in the CAF competitions for the previous five seasons (CAF 5-year ranking points shown in parentheses):

- Pot A contained the four highest-ranked losers of the Champions League first round.
- Pot B contained the twelve lowest-ranked winners of the Confederation Cup first round.
- Pot C contained the four highest-ranked winners of the Confederation Cup first round.
- Pot D contained the twelve lowest-ranked losers of the Champions League first round.

First, a team from Pot A and a team from Pot B were drawn into four ties. Next, a team from Pot C and a team from Pot D were drawn into four ties. Finally, the remaining teams from Pot B and Pot D were drawn into the last eight ties.

Pot	Pot A	Pot B	Pot C	Pot D
Qualified from	Champions League	Confederation Cup	Confederation Cup	Champions League
Teams	(Democratic Republic of the Congo) TP Mazembe (58 pts); (Republic of the Congo) AC Léopards (16 pts); (Morocco) FUS Rabat (12 pts); (Tanzania) Young Africans (5 pts)	(Angola) Recreativo do Libolo (2 pts); (Algeria) JS Kabylie; (Algeria) MC Alger; (Egypt) Al-Masry; (Morocco) IR Tanger; (Morocco) MAS Fez; (Rwanda) Rayon Sports; (South Africa) Platinum Stars; (South Africa) SuperSport United; (Sudan) Al-Hilal Al-Ubayyid; (Eswatini) Mbabane Swallows; (Tunisia) Club Africain	(Tunisia) CS Sfaxien (21 pts); (Zambia) ZESCO United (15 pts); (Ivory Coast) ASEC Mimosas (8 pts); (Egypt) Smouha (4 pts)	(Burkina Faso) Rail Club du Kadiogo; (Ivory Coast) AS Tanda; (Gabon) CF Mounana; (The Gambia) Gambia Ports Authority; (Guinea) Horoya; (Liberia) Barrack Young Controllers; (Madagascar) CNaPS Sport; (Mauritius) AS Port-Louis 2000; (Nigeria) Enugu Rangers; (Nigeria) Rivers United; (South Africa) Bidvest Wits; (Uganda) KCCA

The 16 winners of the play-off round advanced to the group stage.

Team 1	Agg.	Team 2	1st leg	2nd leg
Young Africans (Tanzania)	1–4	(Algeria) MC Alger	1–0	0–4
TP Mazembe (Democratic Republic of the Congo)	2–0	(Algeria) JS Kabylie	2–0	0–0
AC Léopards (Republic of the Congo)	3–4	(Eswatini) Mbabane Swallows	1–0	2–4
FUS Rabat (Morocco)	3–2	(Morocco) MAS Fez	2–1	1–1
Enugu Rangers (Nigeria)	2–5	(Zambia) ZESCO United	2–2	0–3
CF Mounana (Gabon)	2–1	(Ivory Coast) ASEC Mimosas	2–1	0–0
Rail Club du Kadiogo (Burkina Faso)	1–4	(Tunisia) CS Sfaxien	1–2	0–2
Bidvest Wits (South Africa)	0–1	(Egypt) Smouha	0–0	0–1
CNaPS Sport (Madagascar)	1–1 (a)	(Angola) Recreativo do Libolo	1–1	0–0
KCCA (Uganda)	1–1 (4–3 p)	(Egypt) Al-Masry	1–0	0–1
Gambia Ports Authority (The Gambia)	1–4	(Sudan) Al-Hilal Al-Ubayyid	1–1	0–3
AS Port-Louis 2000 (Mauritius)	3–6	(Tunisia) Club Africain	1–2	2–4
Rivers United (Nigeria)	2–0	(Rwanda) Rayon Sports	2–0	0–0
Barrack Young Controllers (Liberia)	1–6	(South Africa) SuperSport United	1–1	0–5
AS Tanda (Ivory Coast)	2–2 (4–5 p)	(South Africa) Platinum Stars	2–0	0–2
Horoya (Guinea)	4–3	(Morocco) IR Tanger	2–0	2–3

8 April 2017
16:00 UTC+3

Young Africans (Tanzania)	1–0	(Algeria) MC Alger
Kamusoko 60'	Report

National Stadium, Dar es Salaam
Referee: Louis Hakizimana (Rwanda)
15 April 2017
18:00 UTC+1

MC Alger (Algeria)	4–0	(Tanzania) Young Africans
Aouedj 14', 90+1'; Derrardja 39'; Zerdab 65'	Report

Stade du 5 Juillet 1962, Algiers
Referee: Yakhouba Keita (Guinea)

MC Alger won 4–1 on aggregate.

9 April 2017
15:30 UTC+2

TP Mazembe (Democratic Republic of the Congo)	2–0	(Algeria) JS Kabylie
Sinkala 11'; Coulibaly 90'	Report

Stade TP Mazembe, Lubumbashi
Referee: Thierry Nkurunziza (Burundi)
16 April 2017
18:00 UTC+1

JS Kabylie (Algeria)	0–0	(Democratic Republic of the Congo) TP Mazembe
	Report

Stade du 1er Novembre 1954, Tizi Ouzou
Referee: Ali Lemghaifry (Mauritania)

TP Mazembe won 2–0 on aggregate.

9 April 2017
15:30 UTC+1

AC Léopards (Republic of the Congo)	1–0	(Eswatini) Mbabane Swallows
Makiessé 87'	Report

Stade Denis Sassou Nguesso, Dolisie
Referee: Pacifique Ndabihawenimana (Burundi)
15 April 2017
15:00 UTC+2

Mbabane Swallows (Eswatini)	4–2	(Republic of the Congo) AC Léopards
Tsabedze 40'; Mkhweli 50'; Tshishimbi 88'; Sikhondze 90'	Report	Ngouelou 13'; Makiessé 30'

Somhlolo National Stadium, Lobamba
Referee: Hélder Martins de Carvalho (Angola)

Mbabane Swallows won 4–3 on aggregate.

9 April 2017
20:00 UTC+1

FUS Rabat (Morocco)	2–1	(Morocco) MAS Fez
Fouzair 20' (pen.); Jahouh 90'	Report	Boua 83'

Stade de FUS, Rabat
Referee: Mahmoud El Banna (Egypt)
15 April 2017
16:00 UTC+1

MAS Fez (Morocco)	1–1	(Morocco) FUS Rabat
Rabja 62' (pen.)	Report	Njie 54'

Fez Stadium, Fez
Referee: Sadok Selmi (Tunisia)

FUS Rabat won 3–2 on aggregate.

9 April 2017
16:00 UTC+1

Enugu Rangers (Nigeria)	2–2	(Zambia) ZESCO United
Madu 24' (pen.); Okoro 46'	Report	Owino 72'; Kongolo 76'

Nnamdi Azikiwe Stadium, Enugu
Referee: Issa Sy (Senegal)
15 April 2017
17:35 UTC+2 (Note: The kickoff of ZESCO United v Enugu Rangers match was delayed from 15:00 to 17:35 due to travel issues of Enugu Rangers.)

ZESCO United (Zambia)	3–0	(Nigeria) Enugu Rangers
Ching'andu 25', 38'; Were 62'	Report

Levy Mwanawasa Stadium, Ndola
Referee: Hamada Nampiandraza (Madagascar)

ZESCO United won 5–2 on aggregate.

8 April 2017
15:00 UTC+1

CF Mounana (Gabon)	2–1	(Ivory Coast) ASEC Mimosas
Autchanga 20'; Zamble 63'	Report	Koanda 67'

Stade de l'Amitié Sino-Gabonaise, Libreville
Referee: Bamlak Tessema Weyesa (Ethiopia)
16 April 2017
16:00 UTC+0

ASEC Mimosas (Ivory Coast)	0–0	(Gabon) CF Mounana
	Report

Stade Robert Champroux, Abidjan
Referee: Davies Omweno (Kenya)

CF Mounana won 2–1 on aggregate.

9 April 2017
15:30 UTC+0

Rail Club du Kadiogo (Burkina Faso)	1–2	(Tunisia) CS Sfaxien
Sylla 66'	Report	Ndoye 51'; Habbassi 83'

Stade du 4 Août, Ouagadougou
Attendance: 0 (Note: The Rail Club du Kadiogo v CS Sfaxien match was played behind closed doors due to sanctions imposed following incidents during the Champions League first round match between Rail Club du Kadiogo and USM Alger on 18 March 2017.)
Referee: Denis Dembélé (Ivory Coast)
14 April 2017
18:00 UTC+1

CS Sfaxien (Tunisia)	2–0	(Burkina Faso) Rail Club du Kadiogo
Hannachi 5'; Aouadhi 82'	Report

Stade Taïeb Mhiri, Sfax
Referee: Bouchaïb El Ahrach (Morocco)

CS Sfaxien won 4–1 on aggregate.

8 April 2017
15:00 UTC+2

Bidvest Wits (South Africa)	0–0	(Egypt) Smouha
	Report

Bidvest Stadium, Johannesburg
Referee: Jean-Jacques Ndala Ngambo (DR Congo)
15 April 2017
17:00 UTC+2

Smouha (Egypt)	1–0	(South Africa) Bidvest Wits
Mekky 37' (pen.)	Report

Borg El Arab Stadium, Alexandria
Referee: Ferdinand Udoh (Nigeria)

Smouha won 1–0 on aggregate.

8 April 2017
14:30 UTC+3

CNaPS Sport (Madagascar)	1–1	(Angola) Recreativo do Libolo
Rakotoharimalala 90+2'	Report	Boukama-Kaya 67'

Vontovorona Stadium, Antananarivo
Referee: Ahmad Imtehaz Heeralall (Mauritius)
15 April 2017
15:00 UTC+1

Recreativo do Libolo (Angola)	0–0	(Madagascar) CNaPS Sport
	Report

Estádio Municipal de Calulo, Calulo
Referee: Joshua Bondo (Botswana)

1–1 on aggregate. Recreativo do Libolo won on away goals.

8 April 2017
16:00 UTC+3

KCCA (Uganda)	1–0	(Egypt) Al-Masry
Nsibambi 89'	Report

Phillip Omondi Stadium, Kampala
Referee: Mahmood Ali Mahmood Ismail (Sudan)
15 April 2017
19:00 UTC+2

Al-Masry (Egypt)	1–0	(Uganda) KCCA
Gomaa 24'	Report
Penalties
Azab (penalty scored); Mourad (penalty missed); Mansour (penalty missed); Gomaa (penalty scored); Abdelaal (penalty scored)	3–4	(penalty scored) Sserunkuma; (penalty scored) Mutyaba; (penalty scored) Awany; (penalty missed) Majwega; (penalty scored) Ochan

Ismailia Stadium, Ismailia
Referee: Youssef Essrayri (Tunisia)

1–1 on aggregate. KCCA won 4–3 on penalties.

9 April 2017
16:00 UTC+0

Gambia Ports Authority (The Gambia)	1–1	(Sudan) Al-Hilal Al-Ubayyid
Sarr 43'	Report	Hassan 62'

Independence Stadium, Bakau
Referee: Daniel Laryea (Ghana)
16 April 2017
20:00 UTC+3

Al-Hilal Al-Ubayyid (Sudan)	3–0	(The Gambia) Gambia Ports Authority
Moukoro 30'; El Tahir 62'; El Shigail 87'	Report

Al-Ubayyid Stadium, Al-Ubayyid
Referee: Tinyiko Hlungwani (South Africa)

Al-Hilal Al-Ubayyid won 4–1 on aggregate.

9 April 2017
15:30 UTC+4

AS Port-Louis 2000 (Mauritius)	1–2	(Tunisia) Club Africain
Guikan 87' (pen.)	Report	Kchouk 59'; Haddad 82'

Stade George V, Curepipe
Referee: Souleiman Ahmed Djama (Djibouti)
15 April 2017
16:00 UTC+1

Club Africain (Tunisia)	4–2	(Mauritius) AS Port-Louis 2000
Khalifa 8'; Rusike 11'; Abdi 36'; Ayadi 38'	Report	Guikan 75'; Botlar 88'

Stade Olympique de Radès, Tunis
Referee: Hassan Mohamed Hagi (Somalia)

Club Africain won 6–3 on aggregate.

16 April 2017 (Note: Both legs between Rivers United and Rayon Sports were postponed by a week at the request of the Rwandese Association Football Federation in order to commemorate the Rwandan genocide during the period of 7–14 April.)
16:00 UTC+1

Rivers United (Nigeria)	2–0	(Rwanda) Rayon Sports
Atuloma 30'; Kuemian 51'	Report

Yakubu Gowon Stadium, Port Harcourt
Referee: Mustapha Ghorbal (Algeria)
22 April 2017
15:30 UTC+2

Rayon Sports (Rwanda)	0–0	(Nigeria) Rivers United
	Report

Amahoro Stadium, Kigali
Referee: Norman Matemera (Zimbabwe)

Rivers United won 2–0 on aggregate.

9 April 2017
16:00 UTC+0

Barrack Young Controllers (Liberia)	1–1	(South Africa) SuperSport United
Dukuly 25'	Report	Lakay 11'

Antoinette Tubman Stadium, Monrovia
Referee: António Rodrigues (Cape Verde)
16 April 2017
18:00 UTC+2

SuperSport United (South Africa)	5–0	(Liberia) Barrack Young Controllers
Mnyamane 5'; Brockie 32', 53', 64' (pen.); Lakay 68'	Report

Lucas Masterpieces Moripe Stadium, Pretoria
Referee: Antoine Effa (Cameroon)

SuperSport United won 6–1 on aggregate.

9 April 2017
15:30 UTC+0

AS Tanda (Ivory Coast)	2–0	(South Africa) Platinum Stars
Zougoula 21' (pen.); Assare 82'	Report

Stade Robert Champroux, Abidjan
Referee: Kokou Fagla (Togo)
16 April 2017
15:00 UTC+2

Platinum Stars (South Africa)	2–0	(Ivory Coast) AS Tanda
Shilongo 27' (pen.); Ng'ambi 79'	Report
Penalties
Mere (penalty scored); Links (penalty scored); Mabena (penalty scored); Mzimela (penalty missed); Ntuli (penalty scored); Msomi (penalty scored)	5–4	(penalty missed) Kouamé; (penalty missed) Cissoko

Royal Bafokeng Stadium, Rustenburg
Referee: Janny Sikazwe (Zambia)

2–2 on aggregate. Platinum Stars won 5–4 on penalties.

9 April 2017
16:00 UTC+0

Horoya (Guinea)	2–0	(Morocco) IR Tanger
Ouédraogo 17'; Mando 32'	Report

Stade du 28 Septembre, Conakry
Referee: Juste Ephrem Zio (Burkina Faso)
15 April 2017
20:00 UTC+1

IR Tanger (Morocco)	3–2	(Guinea) Horoya
Guy 31' (pen.); Belmaalem 35' (pen.); Ankobo 89'	Report	Ouédraogo 48'; Sankhon 49'

Grand Stade de Tanger, Tangier
Referee: Ibrahim Nour El Din (Egypt)

Horoya won 4–3 on aggregate.
