= Ndzie =

Ndzie is a Cameroonian surname. Notable people with the surname include:

- Ludovic Ndzie (born 1994), Cameroonian footballer
- Martin Ndzie (born 2003), Cameroonian footballer
