= Kalanda (surname) =

Kalanda is a surname. Notable people with the surname include:

- Frank Kalanda, Ugandan footballer
- Paul Lokiru Kalanda (1927–2015), Ugandan priest
