= Peter Etebo =

Nigerian footballer

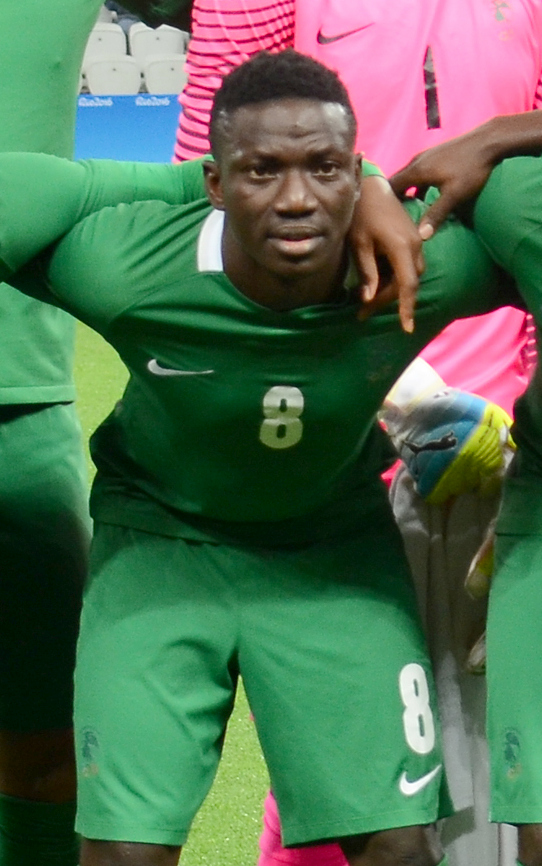
- Etebo lining up for Nigeria at the 2016 Summer Olympics

Personal information
- Full name: Oghenekaro Peter Etebo
- Date of birth: 9 November 1995 (age 30)
- Place of birth: Warri, Nigeria
- Height: 1.76 m (5 ft 9 in)
- Position: Central midfielder

Team information
- Current team: Geçlerbirliği
- Number: 5

Youth career
- 2011: Lord Honour FC
- 2012: Warri Wolves

Senior career*
Years	Team	Apps	(Gls)
2013–2015	Warri Wolves	64	(23)
2016–2018	Feirense	52	(9)
2018	→ Las Palmas (loan)	14	(0)
2018–2023	Stoke City	45	(2)
2020	→ Getafe (loan)	11	(1)
2020–2021	→ Galatasaray (loan)	29	(0)
2021–2022	→ Watford (loan)	10	(0)
2022–2023	→ Aris (loan)	25	(0)
2024–	Gençlerbirliği	28	(0)

International career^{‡}
2015–2016	Nigeria U23	19	(11)
2013–2022	Nigeria	44	(3)
Medal record
Men's football
Representing Nigeria
Africa Cup of Nations
Third place	2019 Egypt
Africa U-23 Cup of Nations
Winner	2015 Senegal
Olympic Games
Bronze medal – third place	2016 Rio de Janeiro	Team
- * Club domestic league appearances and goals as of 1 June 2026 ‡ National team caps and goals as of 17 November 2022

Oghenekaro Peter Etebo (born 9 November 1995) is a Nigerian professional footballer who plays as a midfielder for Turkish club Gençlerbirliği.

Etebo started out at Warri Wolves where he spent three years before moving into European football with Portuguese side Feirense. He helped the side gain promotion to the Primeira Liga and established themselves as a top-flight club. Etebo had a six-month loan spell at Spanish side Las Palmas in the 2017–18 season. Etebo joined English side Stoke City in June 2018 for a fee of £6.35 million.

== Club career ==
=== Warri Wolves ===
Etebo joined Warri Wolves in 2012, Etebo was announced as a member of the senior squad for the 2013 Nigeria Premier League season. However, due to his school studies and a delayed start to the league season, he only got to make his professional debut on 14 April 2013, announcing himself to Nigerian fans by scoring the first hat-trick of the season. With his goals in the 4th, 9th and 37th minutes and another by Joseph Osadiaye in the 12th minute as Wolves were up by four goals in the first half against El-Kanemi Warriors.

His excellent debut season continued when he scored the fastest hat-trick in the league in a 3–1 win against Wikki Tourists, scoring all three goals within 22 minutes of play. Etebo opened scoring for Wolves in the seventh minute of the game, but the celebrations had yet to die down when Waziri Christopher equalized for Wikki. Etebo struck again in the 12th minute to restore Wolves' lead, and he completed his hat-trick in the 29th minute, after the hosts were awarded a spot kick. In March 2014, he scored his first continental goal against Union Douala in the 2014 CAF Confederation Cup. His performances in the CAF Confederation Cup got the attention of Tunisian club Espérance and Egyptian side Zamalek, sparking a fight over his signature. In May 2014 Etebo had a trial at Italian club Udinese.

In 2015 Etebo received the Glo Wondergoal award, for the best goal of the 2015 Nigeria Professional Football League season, which was scored against Bayelsa United. On 7 January 2016, he won the Most Promising Talent of the Year award at the CAF Awards in Abuja, Nigeria. In total Etebo scored 23 goals in 64 league games for Warri Wolves in his three years with the club.

=== Feirense ===
Etebo joined Portuguese LigaPro club Feirense in early 2016, he played four times in 2015–16, scoring once helping them to gain promotion to the Primeira Liga. He played 27 times in 2016–17 as Feirense finished in eight position narrowly misses out on a European place by two points.

==== Las Palmas (loan) ====
On 31 January 2018, Etebo was loaned to La Liga side UD Las Palmas for six months, with a buyout clause. Etebo played 14 matches with Las Palmas but was unable to prevent them being relegated. Etebo earned praise for his performances with the Canary Islands side.

=== Stoke City ===
On 11 June 2018, Etebo signed for EFL Championship side Stoke City for €7.2million (£6.35 million) from Feirense on a five-year deal. He became new manager Gary Rowett's first signing at Stoke, who described him as an 'energetic midfielder'. Etebo revealed that he turned down offers from Premier League clubs before joining Stoke. He made his Stoke debut on 5 August 2018 against Leeds United. Etebo played 37 times in 2018–19 and was one of the teams's better performers as Stoke finished in 16th position. He scored twice both of which were powerful strikes against Nottingham Forest and Blackburn Rovers.

Etebo had a delayed start to the 2019–20 season due to his involvement with Nigeria at the 2019 Africa Cup of Nations. Stoke began the season in terrible form and found themselves in the Championship relegation places which cost manager Nathan Jones his job in November 2019. Under new manager Michael O'Neill, Etebo was dropped from the squad with O'Neill critical of his efforts in training. This lead him to being linked with a move away from the club in January 2020.

In January 2020, Etebo joined La Liga side Getafe on loan for the remainder of the 2019–20 season with an option to purchase. Etebo played 11 times for Getafe scoring once against SD Eibar but the club decided against activating their purchase option.

On 9 September 2020, Etebo joined Turkish side Galatasaray on loan for the 2020–21 season. He played 29 times for Galatasary as they finished in second place, missing out on the title to Beşiktaş on goal difference.

On 9 July 2021, Etebo joined newly promoted Premier League side Watford on a season-long loan deal with an option to buy. On 14 August 2021, he made his competitive debut for Watford in their league opener against Aston Villa, where Watford won 3–2. Etebo struggled with injuries in 2021–22, making ten appearances for the Hornets as they suffered relegation from the Premier League and at the end of the season they decided against signing him on a permanent basis.

=== Aris ===
On 15 September 2022, Etebo joined Greek Super League side Aris on a permanent deal.

== International career ==
Etebo made his international debut on 27 July 2013 against Côte d'Ivoire in a 2–0 loss in Abidjan during the 2014 African Nations Championship qualification campaign for home-based players. He also played against Jordan in an international friendly on 23 October 2013. In December 2015, he helped the Nigerian U-23 Team to the U-23 Africa Cup of Nations triumph in Senegal; finishing top scorer with five goals, including a brace in a 2–1 win against Algeria in the final. Both goals were characterized by deep runs from his team's own half. Having almost single-handedly guaranteed Nigeria's qualification to the Olympic games, he was subsequently selected by Nigeria in the 35-man provisional squad for the 2016 Summer Olympics. Following a tumultuous arrival in Brazil, he scored four goals against Japan in Nigeria's opening group match. The game ended 5–4 to Nigeria. Injured in the third game of the tournament, he played a lessened part in the run of the team to a bronze medal finish. Etebo is a member of the full Nigeria national team.

Etebo was named in Nigeria's 23-man squad for the 2018 World Cup in Russia. He started all three of Nigeria's group matches which saw them beat Iceland but lose to Argentina and Croatia which meant that they failed to progress to the knock-out stages.

== Career statistics ==
=== Club ===
As of match played 5 June 2023

Appearances and goals by club, season and competition
Club	Season	League			National cup (Note: Includes Taça de Portugal, FA Cup, Copa del Rey, Turkish Cup, Greek Football Cup)		League cup (Note: Includes Taça da Liga, EFL Cup)		Europe		Total	
Club	Season	Division	Apps	Goals	Apps	Goals	Apps	Goals	Apps	Goals	Apps	Goals
Feirense	2015–16	LigaPro	4	1	0	0	0	0	—		4	1
Feirense	2016–17	Primeira Liga	23	2	1	0	3	1	—		27	3
Feirense	2017–18	Primeira Liga	18	4	1	0	0	0	—		19	4
Feirense	Total		45	7	2	0	3	1	—		50	8
Las Palmas (loan)	2017–18	La Liga	14	0	0	0	—		—		14	0
Stoke City	2018–19	Championship	34	2	2	0	1	0	—		37	2
Stoke City	2019–20	Championship	11	0	0	0	3	0	—		14	0
Stoke City	2020–21	Championship	0	0	0	0	0	0	—		0	0
Stoke City	2021–22	Championship	0	0	0	0	0	0	—		0	0
Stoke City	Total		45	2	2	0	4	0	—		51	2
Getafe (loan)	2019–20	La Liga	10	1	1	0	—		0	0	11	1
Galatasaray (loan)	2020–21	Süper Lig	24	0	3	0	—		2 (Note: Appearances in UEFA Europa League)	0	29	0
Watford (loan)	2021–22	Premier League	9	0	0	0	1	0	—		10	0
Aris (loan)	2022–23	Super League Greece	25	0	3	0	—		—		28	0
Career total			171	10	11	0	8	1	2	0	193	11

=== International ===
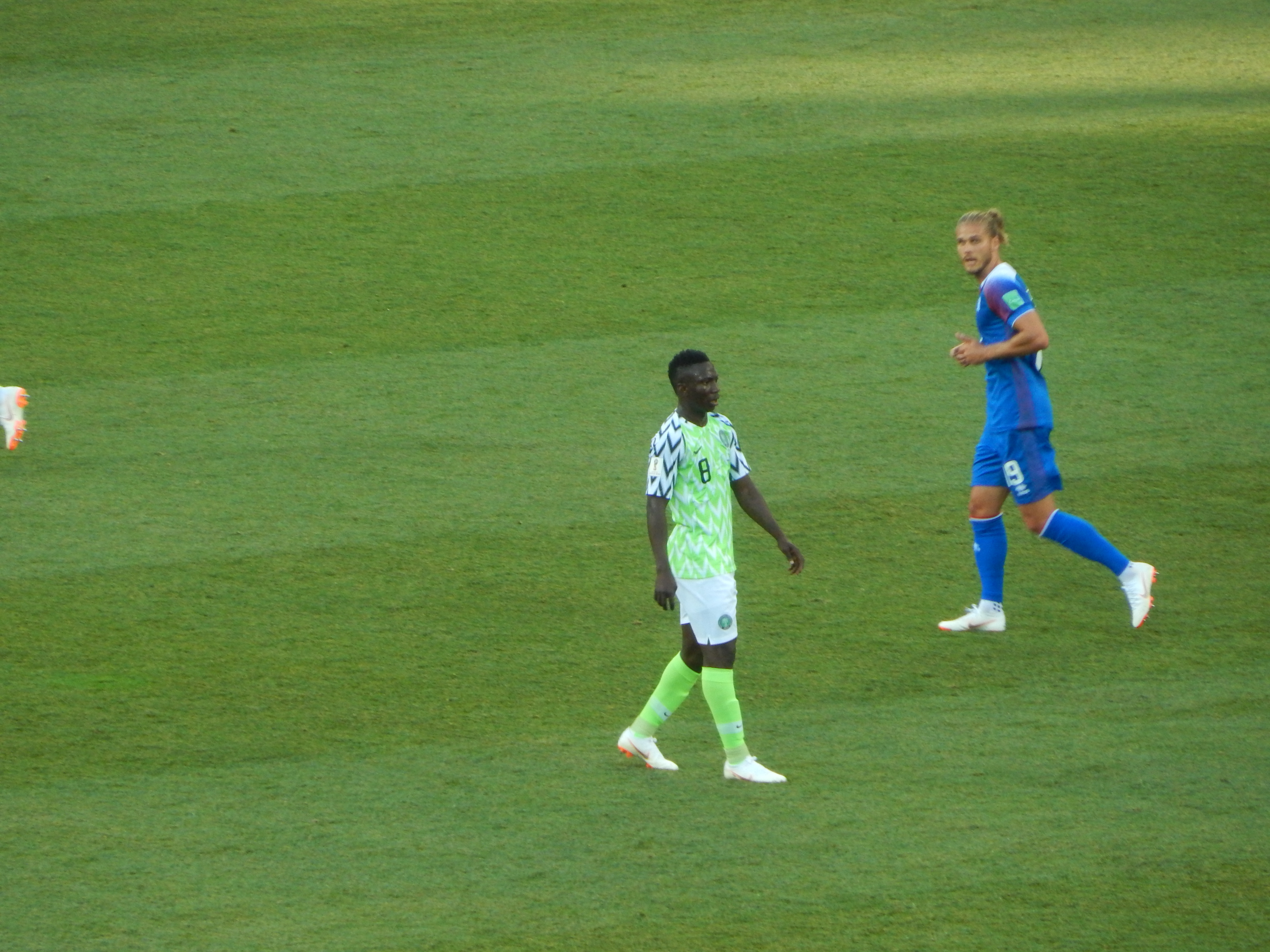
Etebo with Nigeria against Iceland at the 2018 FIFA World Cup

As of match played 13 June 2022

Appearances and goals by national team and year
National team	Year	Apps	Goals
Nigeria	2013	3	0
Nigeria	2016	4	1
Nigeria	2017	4	0
Nigeria	2018	11	0
Nigeria	2019	13	0
Nigeria	2020	2	0
Nigeria	2021	3	1
Nigeria	2022	4	1
Total		44	3

Scores and results list Nigeria's goal tally first, score column indicates score after each Etebo goal.

List of international goals scored by Peter Etebo
No.	Date	Venue	Opponent	Score	Result	Competition
1	25 March 2016	Ahmadu Bello Stadium, Kaduna, Nigeria	Egypt	1–0	1–1	2017 Africa Cup of Nations qualification
2	30 March 2021	Ahmadu Bello Stadium, Kaduna, Nigeria	Lesotho	2–0	3–0	2021 Africa Cup of Nations qualification
3	13 June 2022	Stade Adrar, Agadir, Morocco	São Tomé and Príncipe	5–0	10–0	2023 Africa Cup of Nations qualification

== Honours ==
Nigeria U23

- Olympic Bronze Medal: 2016
