= Selasi Adjei =

Ghanaian footballer

Personal information
- Full name: Selasi Adjei
- Date of birth: 12 November 1993 (age 33)
- Place of birth: Aflao, Ghana
- Position: Forward

Youth career
- 2002: Aflao Hearts Babie
- 2009: Windy Professional FC

Senior career*
Years	Team	Apps	(Gls)
2009–2011	King Faisal Babes	23	(11)
2011–2012	Heart of Lions	25	(16)
2012–2013	Amidaus Professionals	23	(13)
2013–2017	Hearts of Oak	58	(23)
2017–2018	Nakambala Leopards	12	(6)
- * Club domestic league appearances and goals as of 14:23, 22 June 2018 (UTC)

Selasi Adjei (born 12 November 1993) is a Ghanaian footballer who is currently a free agent after ending his contract with Zambian club Nakambala Leopards.

== Club career ==
=== Early career ===
Adjei began at Aflao Hearts Babie in 2002, Windy Professional FC in 2009.

=== Professional ===
Adjei began his professional football career with King Faisal 2009, Hearts of Lions FC in 2011, Amidaus Professionals in 2012 and scored 10 league goals in 9 matches the first round of the 2012–2013 season, and in the 2013–14 season it was announced that Adeji had signed a one-year deal with Ghanaian side Hearts of Oak.

On 7 June 2017, Adjei left Hearts of Oak SC and signed with MTN/FAZ Super Division side Nakambala Leopards.

=== Position ===
Adjei can play as Attacker.
