= Moreetsi Mosimanyana =

Motswana footballer

Personal information
- Full name: Moreetsi Mosimanyana
- Place of birth: Botswana
- Height: 1.70 m (5 ft 7 in)
- Position: Defender

Team information
- Current team: Notwane

Senior career*
Years	Team	Apps	(Gls)
2007–2009	Notwane		

International career^{‡}
2009	Botswana	1	(0)
- * Club domestic league appearances and goals ‡ National team caps and goals as of 10:56, 21 December 2009 (UTC)

Moreetsi Mosimanyana is a Motswana footballer. He has won one cap for the Botswana national football team.

== See also ==
- Football in Botswana
