= Sthembiso Ngcobo =

South African soccer player

Personal information
- Full name: Sthembiso Amos Ngcobo
- Date of birth: 24 September 1983 (age 43)
- Place of birth: Durban, South Africa
- Height: 1.87 m (6 ft 2 in)
- Position: Striker

Senior career*
| Years | Team | Apps | (Gls) |
| 2007 | AmaZulu | 0 | (0) |
| 2006–2007 | → Durban Stars (loan) | 25 | (19) |
| 2007–2010 | Free State Stars | 63 | (15) |
| 2010–2013 | Kaizer Chiefs | 50 | (5) |
| 2013–2014 | → AmaZulu (loan) | 11 | (1) |
| 2014–2015 | Bidvest Wits | 37 | (10) |
| 2015–2016 | Free State Stars | 10 | (2) |

International career
| 2008–2010 | South Africa | 6 | (1) |
- * Club domestic league appearances and goals

Sthembiso Ngcobo (born 24 September 1983 in Durban) is a South African association football striker for Premier Soccer League club Free State Stars, Kaizer Chiefs, AmaZulu and Bidvest Wits.

== Career ==
He signed for promotion gaining Free State Stars before the start of the 2007–08 Premier Soccer League season from National First Division side Durban Stars. His first season in the top flight was a huge success with him gaining a call up to the national squad. He moved to Kaizer Chiefs for the 2010–11 Premier Soccer League.

== International goals ==
| # | Date | Venue | Opponent | Score | Result | Competition |
|---|---|---|---|---|---|---|
| 1 | 11 March 2008 | Germiston, South Africa | Zimbabwe | 1–1 | 2–1 | Friendly match |
