= Mthunzi Mkhontfo =

Swazi footballer (born 1994)

Personal information
- Full name: Mthunzi Mkhontfo
- Date of birth: December 28, 1994 (age 31)
- Place of birth: Eswatini
- Position: Midfielder

International career^{‡}
Years	Team	Apps	(Gls)
2011–	eSwatini	34	(3)
- ‡ National team caps and goals as of 18:40, 11 October 2024 (UTC)

Mthunzi Mkhontfo (born 28 December 1994) is a liSwati footballer.

== International career ==
=== International goals ===
Scores and results list eSwatini's goal tally first.

No	Date	Venue	Opponent	Score	Result	Competition
1.	10 January 2015	Mbombela Stadium, Nelspruit, South Africa	Burkina Faso	1–0	1–5	Friendly
2.	20 May 2015	Royal Bafokeng Stadium, Phokeng, South Africa	Suriname	2–0	2–0	2015 COSAFA Cup
3.	9 October 2015	El Hadj Hassan Gouled Aptidon Stadium, Djibouti City, Djibouti	Djibouti	2–0	3–1	2018 FIFA World Cup qualification
