= Ndumiso Mabena =

South African soccer player

Personal information
- Date of birth: 19 May 1987 (age 39)
- Place of birth: Groblersdal, South Africa
- Height: 1.80 m (5 ft 11 in)
- Position: Attacking midfielder

Team information
- Current team: Polokwane City
- Number: 8

Senior career*
| Years | Team | Apps | (Gls) |
| 2007–2009 | Winners Park | | |
| 2009–2014 | Orlando Pirates | 53 | (7) |
| 2014–2017 | Platinum Stars | 79 | (21) |
| 2017–2021 | Bloemfontein Celtic | 96 | (22) |
| 2021–2022 | Royal AM | 21 | (2) |
| 2022–2023 | Orlando Pirates | 1 | (0) |
| 2023– | Polokwane City | 10 | (1) |
- * Club domestic league appearances and goals as of 27 March 2024

Ndumiso Mabena (born 19 May 1987) is a South African soccer player. He plays as a forward for Polokwane City, which competes in the South African Premier Division.

== Club career ==
After playing for Winners Park in the National First Division, Mabena joined Orlando Pirates in 2009 and has since played for Platinum Stars and Bloemfontein Celtic. In summer 2021, Celtic's top-flight status was purchased by Royal AM, with Royal AM inheriting almost all of Celtic's first-team squad, including Mabena.
