= Béranger Itoua =

Congolese footballer

Personal information
- Date of birth: 9 May 1992 (age 34)
- Place of birth: Congo
- Position: Centre-back

Team information
- Current team: Sohar

Senior career*
Years	Team	Apps	(Gls)
2012–2013	CSMD Diables Noirs		
2013–2014	Orlando Pirates		
2014–2017	CARA Brazzaville		
2017–2018	AS Otôho		
2018–2019	Al-Shoulla	16	(1)
2019–	Sohar		

International career
2016–	Congo	5	(0)
- * Club domestic league appearances and goals

Béranger Itoua (born 9 May 1992 in Congo) is a Congolese professional footballer who plays for Sohar SC in the Oman Professional League.

== Orlando Pirates ==
Trialing with the South African outfit in July 2013, Itoua penned a deal with the Bucs ten days later. However, the transfer information was never corroborated and officials of the club denied any news stating that Itoua was actually signed. The defender then trained with their squad but was never officially registered with the league.

On 14 August 2019 it was confirmed, that Itoua had joined Sohar SC.
