= Ibrahim Sillah =

Sierra Leonean footballer (born 1995)

Personal information
- Date of birth: 4 April 1995 (age 31)
- Place of birth: Port Loko, Sierra Leone
- Height: 1.82 m (6 ft 0 in)
- Position: Midfielder

Team information
- Current team: Harkemase Boys
- Number: 17

Senior career*
Years	Team	Apps	(Gls)
2014–2016	Sporting Almere		
2016–2017	Oranje Nassau		
2017–2019	ACV Assen	42	(0)
2019–2020	Germania Leer	15	(0)
2020–2023	Kickers Emden	51	(5)
2023–2025	ACV Assen	57	(1)
2025–	Harkemase Boys	0	(0)

International career
2022–2024	Sierra Leone	11	(0)
- * Club domestic league appearances and goals as of 01:49, 11 January 2026 (UTC)

Ibrahim Sillah (born 4 April 1995) is a Sierra Leonean footballer who plays as a midfielder for Harkemase Boys.

== International career ==
Sillah was called up to the Sierra Leone national team in March 2022.

== Career statistics ==
=== Club ===
As of 1 July 2022

Appearances and goals by club, season and competition
Club	Season	League			Cup		Other		Total	
Club	Season	Division	Apps	Goals	Apps	Goals	Apps	Goals	Apps	Goals
ACV Assen	2017–18	Derde Divisie	22	0	0	0	0	0	22	0
ACV Assen	2018–19	Hoofdklasse	20	0	0	0	0	0	20	0
ACV Assen	Total		42	0	0	0	0	0	42	0
Germania Leer	2019–20	Landesliga Weser-Ems	15	0	0	0	0	0	15	0
Kickers Emden	2020–21	Oberliga Niedersachsen	8	0	0	0	0	0	8	0
Kickers Emden	2021–22	Oberliga Niedersachsen	25	5	0	0	2 (Note: Two appearances in the Regionalliga playoffs)	1	27	6
Kickers Emden	2022–23	Regionalliga Nord	0	0	0	0	0	0	0	0
Kickers Emden	Total		33	5	0	0	2	1	35	6
Career total			90	5	0	0	2	1	92	6

=== International ===
As of matches played 11 April 2022

Appearances and goals by national team and year
National team	Year	Apps	Goals
Sierra Leone	2022	2	0
Total		2	0
