= Paseka Sekese =

South African soccer player

Personal information
- Full name: Paseka Patrick Sekese
- Date of birth: 1 April 1994 (age 32)
- Place of birth: Welkom, South Africa
- Position: Midfielder

Team information
- Current team: Richards Bay (on loan from Bidvest Wits)
- Number: 8

Youth career
- 2001–2007: Lion Experience
- 2008–2012: School of Excellence
- 2013–2015: Bidvest Wits

Senior career*
Years	Team	Apps	(Gls)
2015–	Bidvest Wits	13	(2)
2016–2017	→ Cape Town All Stars (loan)	17	(1)
2017–	→ Richards Bay (loan)	9	(0)

International career
2015	South Africa U-23		
- * Club domestic league appearances and goals as of 29 November 2017

Paseka Sekese (born 1 April 1994) is a South African football (soccer) midfielder who plays for Richards Bay FC on loan from Premier Soccer League club Bidvest Wits FC.

== Early years ==
Sekese was born on 1 April 1994 in Thabong, Welkom, in the province of the Free State, South Africa. He started his career at the Lion Experience U12's youth academy in 2004. His recognition began when the team won the Welkom District Football Junior League in the 2004–05 season. The defending champions were known as The Experts. The Lion Experience U12 side won the tournament held by the Welkom Football Association and lifted the Woolworths Trophy at Bronville Stadium. The final was between The Experts and Dinonyana, and Sekese was awarded the Man of the Match award. He captained Lion Experience and won the Welkom Clover Danone League.

== Club career ==
Sekese began his career with Transnet School of Excellence in 2007. In 2012, he graduated at the School of Excellence and signed an apprentice contract with Bidvest Wits. Sekese made his debut on 14 February 2015 in a CAF Confederations Cup match against Royal Leopards in a 3–0 win. Sekese scored his first goal for Wits on 6 May 2015 in a 2–1 win over Kaizer Chiefs at FNB Stadium.

== International career ==
He was selected to play for the South Africa U/23 squad in a friendly match in Palestine in March 2015.
