= Mbongeni Mzimela =

South African soccer player

Personal information
- Date of birth: 3 April 1985 (age 41)
- Place of birth: eSikhawini, South Africa
- Height: 1.83 m (6 ft 0 in)
- Position: Goalkeeper

Team information
- Current team: Tshakhuma Tsha Madzivhandila
- Number: 50

Senior career*
Years	Team	Apps	(Gls)
2009–2013	AmaZulu	46	(0)
2013–2015	Chippa United	25	(0)
2015–2018	Platinum Stars	61	(1)
2018–2019	Chippa United	12	(0)
2019–	Tshakhuma Tsha Madzivhandila	3	(0)
- * Club domestic league appearances and goals as of 18:57, 17 January 2020 (UTC)

Mbongeni Mzimela (born 3 April 1985) is a South African professional soccer player who plays for Tshakhuma Tsha Madzivhandila, as a goalkeeper.

== Career ==
Born in eSikhawini, Mzimela has played for AmaZulu, Chippa United and Platinum Stars. On 19 March 2017 he scored two penalties for Platinum Stars in an African Confederation Cup match.
