= Banele Sikhondze =

Liswati footballer

Personal information
- Date of birth: 28 June 1993 (age 33)
- Place of birth: Swaziland
- Height: 1.72 m (5 ft 7 1/2 in)
- Position: Midfielder

Team information
- Current team: Mbombela United
- Number: 2

Senior career*
Years	Team	Apps	(Gls)
2012–2014	Manzini Wanderers		
2014–2015	Manzini Sundowns		
2015–2018	Mbabane Swallows		
2018–2020	Polokwane City	7	(0)
2020–	Mbombela United	3	(0)

International career^{‡}
2016–	Eswatini	10	(0)
- * Club domestic league appearances and goals as of 19:29, 30 August 2020 (UTC) ‡ National team caps and goals as of 21:52, 19 March 2025 (UTC)

Banele Sikhondze (born 28 June 1993) is a Liswati footballer who plays as a midfielder for Mbombela United and the Eswatini national team.

== Club career ==
Having previously played for Manzini Wanderers, Manzini Sundowns and Mbabane Swallows, Sikhondze joined South African Premier Division side Polokwane City in the summer of 2018, initially on a one-year deal. In January 2020, Sikhondze left Polokwane City to join Mbombela United.

== International career ==
Sikhondze made his debut for Eswatini in a 1–0 win against Guinea on 5 June 2016.

== Career statistics ==
=== International ===
As of match played 19 March 2025

Appearances and goals by national team and year
National team	Year	Apps	Goals
Eswatini	2016	3	0
Eswatini	2017	2	0
Eswatini	2018	1	0
Eswatini	2019	3	0
Eswatini	2025	1	0
Total		10	0
