= Samuel Onyango =

Kenyan footballer

Personal information
- Full name: Samuel Onyango Ouma
- Date of birth: 30 November 1994 (age 31)
- Place of birth: Migori, Kenya
- Height: 1.72 m (5 ft 8 in)
- Position: Midfielder

Team information
- Current team: Gor Mahia

Senior career*
Years	Team	Apps	(Gls)
2012–2015	SoNy Sugar		
2016–2017	Ulinzi Stars		
2018–	Gor Mahia		

International career^{‡}
2017–	Kenya	11	(0)
- * Club domestic league appearances and goals as of 16:07, 30 June 2020 (UTC) ‡ National team caps and goals as of 16:07, 30 June 2020 (UTC)

Samuel Onyango Ouma (born 30 November 1994) is a Kenyan international footballer who plays for Gor Mahia, as a midfielder.

== Career ==
Born in Migori, he has played club football for SoNy Sugar, Ulinzi Stars and Gor Mahia.

He made his international debut for Kenya in 2017.
