= Joseph Osadiaye =

Nigerian footballer (born 1994)

Personal information
- Full name: Joseph Osunde Osadiaye
- Date of birth: 18 November 1994 (age 31)
- Place of birth: Benin City, Nigeria
- Height: 1.79 m (5 ft 10 in)
- Position: Winger

Team information
- Current team: Lobi Stars

Youth career
- Paulson Football Academy, Benin City

Senior career*
Years	Team	Apps	(Gls)
2011–2012	Akwa United	26	(0)
2012–2015	Warri Wolves	59	(12)
2015–2019	Enyimba	68	(25)
2019-2020	Lobi Stars	1	(0)

International career
2013–	Nigeria	2	
- * Club domestic league appearances and goals

Joseph Osadiaye (born 18 November 1994) is a Nigerian professional footballer who plays for Nigeria Professional Football League outfit, Lobi Stars. He usually plays as a left or right sided winger and he is known for his pace, dribbling skills and accurate left foot shots. Although, predominantly a left-footed player, he is also adept at using his right foot.

== Early life ==
Osadiaye was born in Benin City, a city and the capital of Edo State in southern Nigeria.

== Playing career ==
=== Akwa United ===
In 2011-2012, Joseph started his professional career with Akwa United, a Nigeria Professional Football League club based in Uyo. The winger's impact was evident in his contribution to the team. He featured 20 times in the Nigerian top-flight and made 13 assists. His performance in his first season as a professional earned him a move back to his state of origin as Warri Wolves moved for his signature.

=== Warri Wolves ===
Joseph spent three seasons at Warri Wolves, playing in the Nigerian top division and also featuring on the continent. He featured in 59 league matches across, scoring 12 and he laid on 16 for teammates. In the 2013 edition of the Federation Cup final at the Teslim Balogun Stadium, he netted against Enyimba to bring the scoreline to 2-1 but Ugwu Uwadiegwu equalised to force the game into penalties which the People's Elephant claimed a 5-4 victory. The Seasiders represented Nigeria In the Caf Confederation Cup in the 2013-2014 and 2014-2015 seasons and the winger featured six times, scoring a goal and making three assists. Before the commencement of the 2015-2016 season, he teamed up with prominent Nigerian side, Enyimba.

=== Enyimba ===
He transferred to Enyimba in 2015 and that is where he made his biggest impact so far. Joseph has played 58 games over two seasons and recorded four goals with 13 assists. He also featured in the Caf Champions League for the first time in his career in the 2015-2016 season. He played in six games and laid on three goals for his teammates. It is at the Aba side he added some dynamism to his game as he was used in several positions across attack and midfield. He filled his default wing roles, operated as a support striker and also played as an attacking and side midfielder. After the initial two-year agreement that brought Osadiaye from Warrior Wolves elapsed at the end of the 2016-17 season, the winger penned an extension for another two years in a deal worth 14 million naira. According to the player’s representative, Ogbemudia Endurance Iseri, interests from Enugu Rangers, Akwa United, Sudanese top-flight side Al-Merrieikh and two European sides were shunned.

=== NPFL All-Star ===
==== 2015-16 ====
Joseph was part of the outstanding Nigeria top-flight players chosen for an invitational mini-tournament in Spain (which signaled the partnership of the Spanish La Liga and the NPFL). The NPFL All-Star side had games against Spanish powerhouses, Valencia and Atletico Madrid lined for them. And it was Joseph that scored their only goal in the tourney in their 2-1 loss to Valencia in the opening game on 10 August 2016. The forward, alongside his other Enyimba teammates were unable to continue as they needed to report to their team for Caf Champions League assignment. The All-Star side would later return to Nigeria after suffering a 1-0 loss to Atletico Madrid in the final game.

=== Nigeria ===
He made his debut for the Nigerian national team in 2013 against Ivory Coast and then later Jordan. He has only two international caps.

== See also ==
- Enyimba International F.C.
