= Emeka Atuloma =

Nigerian footballer

Personal information
- Full name: Emeka Francis Atuloma
- Date of birth: 1 October 1992 (age 34)
- Height: 1.86 m (6 ft 1 in)
- Position: Midfielder

Team information
- Current team: Rivers United

Senior career*
Years	Team	Apps	(Gls)
2010–2015	Dolphins		
2016–	Rivers United		

International career^{‡}
2018–	Nigeria	5	(0)
- * Club domestic league appearances and goals as of 16:34, 25 February 2018 (UTC) ‡ National team caps and goals as of 16:34, 25 February 2018 (UTC)

Emeka Francis Atuloma (born 1 October 1992) is a Nigerian international footballer who plays for Rivers United, as a midfielder.

== Career ==
He has played club football for Dolphins and Rivers United.

He made his international debut for Nigeria in 2018.
