= Ludovic Ndzie =

Cameroonian footballer

Personal information
- Full name: Ludovic Ndzie
- Date of birth: 20 June 1994 (age 32)
- Place of birth: Yaounde, Cameroon
- Height: 1.88 m (6 ft 2 in)
- Position: Centre-back

Team information
- Current team: Arras
- Number: 7

Youth career
- 2008–2011: Ouragan FC

Senior career*
Years	Team	Apps	(Gls)
2012–2014	Renaissance	37	(4)
2014–2016	Unisport	43	(2)
2016–2019	Ubuntu Cape Town	45	(1)
2019–2020	Grand-Synthe	0	(0)
2020–	Arras		
- * Club domestic league appearances and goals as of 14:30, 12 February 2021 (UTC)

Ludovic Ndzie (born 20 June 1994) is a Cameroonian professional footballer who plays as a central defender or midfielder for French amateur side Arras FA.

== International career ==
National team
Years	Team		Apps
2012	Cameroon	U20	4
2013	Cameroon	Local team	1
2016	Cameroon	U23	2

== Biography ==
Ndzie made his professional debut with Renaissance FC (Cameroonian 1st league). At the same time, he played for the Cameroonian local team, also U20 for the Francophonie tournament in 2012. After one season with the club, as a professional footballer, Ndzie joined Unisport FC.

2014-16 he has made lots of appearances for the African Champions league (CAF), and he was selected to play Olympic Games playoff and U23 playoff (CAN).

In May 2016, FC Cape Town sign "Cameroon youngster : The 21-year-old burst onto the domestic scene in Cameroon in 2012 with Renaissance and was almost immediately elevated to the country’s junior national teams."

"Ndzie is an intelligent aggressive attacking central midfielder who is gifted with a very big engine. His aggressive power will add extra value to the African Beasts attack."

Ndzie was assigned the number 4 shirt, central defender position, and made his club debut for Ubuntu FC Cape Town in the club's opening pre-season fixture in 2017. Ndzie agreed to a four-year contract with FC Cape Town (now Ubuntu FC Cape Town) in August 2016, tying him to the club until 2020. 2018-19 season, Ndzie played 22 matches, and scored.

In 2019, Ndzie has been described by the South African TV Press as a "strong player in the South African arena" who is "comfortable on both the tactical and technical level".

In January 2020, Ndzie signed for French Championnat National 3 side Olympique Grand-Synthe. He moved to tier six side Arras FA in the summer of 2020.
