= Frank Kalanda =

Ugandan footballer

Personal information
- Full name: Frank Kalanda
- Date of birth: August 8, 1991
- Place of birth: Uganda
- Position: Forward

International career
Years	Team	Apps	(Gls)
2013-2016	Uganda		

Frank Kalanda (born 8 August 1991), commonly known as Machete, is a Ugandan footballer who plays as a forward. He has represented the Uganda national football team and was included in Uganda's squad for the 2016 African Nations Championship.

== Early life ==
Frank was born on 8 August 1991. He was orphaned as a child and was adopted by Haji Mahmood Katamba, the proprietor of Mark Furniture Centre in Bwaise, Kampala. He worked as a carpenter while pursuing his football career.

== Club career ==
Frank played for St Mary's Kitende from 2010 to 2011 before joining Express FC for the 2012-13 season. He scored 15 league goals during that campaign. He moved to URA FC in 2013.

While at URA, he travelled to South Africa in July 2015 for trials with Free State Stars. He scored five goals in three test matches.

He later joined Soana FC, where he played during the 2016-17 season. In July 2017, he moved to Rwandan club AS Kigali. The club unveiled him after completing the transfer from Soana, and he signed a three-year contract.

Frank spent two seasons at AS Kigali, during this time he also played for Rayon Sports. In July 2019, AS Kigali released him along with 11 other players, terminating his contract with a season remaining.

He returned to Express FC ahead of the 2019-20 season and during that season, he scored 11 league goals in 23 appearances, he was listed by the Uganda Premier League's statistical report among the league's leading scorers for the season.

Frank remained at Express FC for the 2020-21 season, during which the club won the Uganda Premier League title. He scored six goals in all competitions during the season. Across his two seasons after returning to the club, he recorded 18 goals in 52 appearances. His contract expired at the end of June 2021, and Express FC confirmed his departure.

In January 2022, he joined Police FC on a six month contract. Frank later joined BUL FC for the 2022-23 season and went on to play for Arua Hill SC where he had 11 league appearances.

In June 2025, he was playing for Gaddafi FC in the FUFA Big League. He scored in the club's 3-0 victory over Kataka on the final day of the 2024-25 season.

== International career ==
Frank made his debut for Uganda on 27 July 2013 in a qualifying match for the 2014 African Nations Championship against Tanzania at Mandela National Stadium in Kampala. He scored twice in Uganda's 3-1 victory. Uganda won the tie 4-1 on aggregate to qualify for the tournament in South Africa.

He was not included in Uganda's final squad for the 2014 tournament. He had left for Vietnam in search of professional opportunities. He returned to the national team during the qualification season for the 2016 African Nations Championship. On 17 October 2015, he scored the opening goal in Uganda's 2-0 first leg victory over Sudan at Nakivubo Stadium in Kampala. Faruku Miya scored Uganda's second goal.

Uganda won the return leg 2-0 in Khartoum on 25 October 2015, securing qualification for the finals in Rwanda. Frank was named among the players in the travelling squad for the return match.

Frank played in Uganda's 23-man squad for the 2016 African Nations Championship in Rwanda and was assigned shirt number 13. Uganda competed in Group D alongside Mali, Zambia and Zimbabwe but did not advance beyond the group stage. In this championship he made 17 appearances for Uganda and scored five goals.
