= Imed Meniaoui =

Tunisian footballer

Personal information
- Date of birth: 19 April 1983 (age 43)
- Place of birth: Nefta, Tunisia
- Height: 1.70 m (5 ft 7 in)
- Position: Forward

Senior career*
Years	Team	Apps	(Gls)
2010–2011	ES Zarzis		
2011–2012	LPS Tozeur		
2012–2014	ES Métlaoui		
2014–2017	Club Africain		
2017–2020	ES Métlaoui		
2020-2022	CS Hammam Lif		
2022-	Paris SC		

International career
2015	Tunisia	1	(0)
- * Club domestic league appearances and goals

Imed Meniaoui (born 19 April 1983) is a Tunisian football striker.
