= 2021–22 Étoile Sportive du Sahel season =

Étoile Sportive du Sahel
2021–22 season
- President: Ridha Charfeddine
- Head coach: Lassaad Dridi (until 4 November 2021); Roger Lemerre (from 18 November 2021) (until 7 March 2022); Lassaad Chabbi (from 8 March 2022)
- Stadium: Stade Olympique de Sousse (Note: Étoile du Sahel play their home matches in many stadiums, Until the Playoff Étoile du Sahel returned to Stade Olympique de Sousse, Sousse.)
- Ligue 1: 5th
- Tunisian Cup: Round of 32
- Champions League: Group stage

In the 2021–22 season, Étoile Sportive du Sahel is competing in the Ligue 1 for the 67th season, as well as the Tunisian Cup. It is their 67th consecutive season in the top flight of Tunisian football. They are competing in Ligue 1, the Champions League and the Tunisian Cup. On February 17, The Tunisian Ministry of Sports announced in an official statement, the resumption of the local football league competition in the presence of the fans after a long absence that extended over the past two years due to the COVID-19 pandemic in Tunisia, which imposed the holding of competitions behind closed doors, The new procedures apply to the competitions of the opening round of the second leg of the Ligue Professionnelle 1, with 50% distributed among the fans of the two teams.

== Squad list ==
Players and squad numbers last updated on 13 August 2021.
Note: Flags indicate national team as has been defined under FIFA eligibility rules. Players may hold more than one non-FIFA nationality.

| No. | Nat. | Position | Name | Date of Birth (Age) | Signed from |
Goalkeepers
| | (Tunisia) | GK | Aymen Mathlouthi | 14 September 1984 (aged 37) | (Saudi Arabia) Al-Adalah FC |
| | (Tunisia) | GK | Ali Jemal | 9 June 1990 (aged 31) | (Tunisia) Stade Tunisien |
| | (Tunisia) | GK | Rami Gabsi | 31 July 1999 (aged 22) | (Tunisia) ES Hammam-Sousse |
Defenders
| | (Tunisia) | CB | Saddam Ben Aziza | 8 February 1991 (aged 30) | (Tunisia) AS Gabès |
| | (Tunisia) | CB | Bahaeddine Sellami | 6 February 1997 (aged 24) | (Tunisia) US Ben Guerdane |
| | (Algeria) | CB | Boualem Mesmoudi | 15 April 1994 (aged 27) | (Algeria) MC Oran |
| | (Tunisia) | CB | Salah Harrabi | 25 January 1999 (aged 22) | (Tunisia) Youth system |
| | (Tunisia) | CB | Ramez Aouani | 8 June 1999 (aged 22) | (Tunisia) JS Kairouan |
| | (Tunisia) | CB | Abdelrazek Bouazra | 8 July 1998 (aged 23) | (Tunisia) JS Kairouan |
| | (Tunisia) | LB | Ghofrane Naouali | 15 June 1999 (aged 22) | (Tunisia) Youth system |
| | (Tunisia) | LB | Baligh Jemmali | 1 December 2000 (aged 21) | (Tunisia) Youth system |
| | (Tunisia) | LB | Houssem Souissi | 8 January 1999 (aged 22) | (Tunisia) JS Kairouan |
| | (Algeria) | RB | Houcine Benayada | 8 August 1992 (aged 29) | (Algeria) CS Constantine |
| | (Tunisia) | RB | Anas Sassi | 5 December 1998 (aged 23) | (Tunisia) JS Kairouan |
Midfielders
| | (Tunisia) | DM | Ayoub Ayed | 4 January 2000 (aged 21) | (Tunisia) Youth system |
| | (Cameroon) | DM | Jacques Mbé | 17 June 1999 (aged 22) | (Tunisia) Youth system |
| | (Algeria) | DM | Salim Boukhanchouche | 6 October 1991 (aged 30) | (Saudi Arabia) Abha Club |
| | (Tunisia) | DM | Mohamed Belhaj Mahmoud | 24 April 2000 (aged 21) | (Tunisia) Youth system |
| | (Tunisia) | DM | Malek Baayou | 29 April 1999 (aged 22) | (Tunisia) Youth system |
| | (Tunisia) | DM | Salaheddine Ghedamsi | 26 August 1998 (aged 23) | (Tunisia) ES Hammam-Sousse |
| | (Libya) | CM | Abdallah Dagou | 21 September 2000 (aged 21) | (Tunisia) Youth system |
| | (Tunisia) | CM | Achref Afli | 6 November 1997 (aged 24) | (Tunisia) ES Hammam-Sousse |
| | (Ghana) | CM | Stanley Aniagyei Ampaw | 26 December 2002 (aged 19) | (Ghana) Liberty Professionals |
| | (Tunisia) | | Yassine Amri | 18 August 1995 (aged 26) | (Tunisia) Club Africain |
| | (Tunisia) | | Yosri Hamza | 2 March 1999 (aged 22) | (Tunisia) Youth system |
| | (Tunisia) | AM | Fraj Kayramani | 22 January 1999 (aged 22) | (Tunisia) Youth system |
| | (Ghana) | AM | Abraham Wayo | 1 August 2003 (aged 18) | (Ghana) Liberty Professionals |
| | (Tunisia) | AM | Yassine Chikhaoui | 21 September 1986 (aged 35) | (Qatar) Al Ahli SC |
| | (Tunisia) | AM | Oussama Abid | 10 August 2002 (aged 19) | (Tunisia) Youth system |
| | (Algeria) | AM | Lyes Benyoucef | 2 March 1996 (aged 25) | Unattached |
Forwards
| | (Tunisia) | | Faik Sik Salem | 21 October 2000 (aged 21) | (Tunisia) Youth system |
| | (Algeria) | LW | Youcef Laouafi | 1 March 1996 (aged 25) | (Algeria) ES Sétif |
| | (Tunisia) | LW | Firas Iffia | 19 May 1997 (aged 24) | (Tunisia) Olympique Béja |
| | (Tunisia) | LW | Louay Ben Hassine | 2 April 2000 (aged 21) | (Tunisia) ES Hammam-Sousse |
| | (Guinea) | LW | Aly Soumah | 10 January 2000 (aged 21) | (Tunisia) Youth system |
| | (Tunisia) | RW | Aymen Sfaxi | 23 December 1995 (aged 26) | (Tunisia) Stade Tunisien |
| | (Algeria) | RW | Tayeb Meziani | 27 February 1996 (aged 25) | (Tunisia) Espérance de Tunis |
| | (Algeria) | RW | Zinedine Boutmène | 21 October 2000 (aged 21) | (Algeria) NA Hussein Dey |
| | (Ivory Coast) | ST | Souleymane Coulibaly | 26 December 1994 (aged 27) | (Scotland) Partick Thistle |
| | (Algeria) | ST | Redouane Zerdoum | 1 January 1999 (aged 23) | (Algeria) NA Hussein Dey |
| | (Tunisia) | ST | Imed Louati | 11 October 1993 (aged 28) | (Denmark) Hobro IK |
| | (Democratic Republic of the Congo) | ST | Vinny Kombe | 24 March 1996 (aged 25) | Unattached |

== Pre-season ==
| 5 August 2021 Friendly | ES Hammam-Sousse | 1–4 | Étoile du Sahel | Hammam Sousse |
| | | Report | Sfaxi; Chikhaoui; Boutmène | Stadium: Stade Bou Ali Lahouar |

| 7 August 2021 Friendly | Stade Tunisien | 0–4 | Étoile du Sahel |
| | | Report | Sfaxi; Amri (?); Ben Hassine |

| 18 August 2021 Friendly | Étoile du Sahel | 4–0 | PEB SPORT |
| | Sfaxi; Boukhanchouche; Ben Hassine; Abid |

== Competitions ==
=== Overview ===
| Competition | Record | | | | | | | | Started round | Final position / round | First match | Last match |
| Competition | G | W | D | L | GF | GA | GD | Win % | Started round | Final position / round | First match | Last match |
|---|---|---|---|---|---|---|---|---|---|---|---|---|
| Ligue 1 (first round) | 14 | 5 | 7 | 2 | 14 | 8 | +6 | 35.71 | —N/a | 3rd | 28 October 2021 | 13 April 2022 |
| Ligue 1 (championship round) | 0 | 0 | 0 | 0 | 0 | 0 | +0 | — | —N/a | To be confirmed | 29 April 2022 | In Progress |
| Tunisian Cup | 0 | 0 | 0 | 0 | 0 | 0 | +0 | — | Round of 32 | To be confirmed | In Progress | In Progress |
| Champions League | 8 | 2 | 4 | 2 | 9 | 8 | +1 | 25.00 | Second round | Group stage | 16 October 2021 | 1 April 2022 |
| Total | 22 | 7 | 11 | 4 | 23 | 16 | +7 | 31.82 | | | | |

Updated to match played 13 April 2022
Source: Competitions

== Ligue 1 ==
=== First round (Group B) ===
==== League table ====
| Pos | Team | Pld | W | D | L | GF | GA | GD | Pts | Qualification or relegation |
|---|---|---|---|---|---|---|---|---|---|---|
| 1 | Club Africain | 14 | 7 | 4 | 3 | 11 | 6 | +5 | 25 | Advance to Playoff |
| 2 | Union Monastirienne | 14 | 6 | 5 | 3 | 8 | 5 | +3 | 23 | Advance to Playoff |
| 3 | Étoile du Sahel | 14 | 5 | 7 | 2 | 14 | 8 | +6 | 22 | Advance to Playoff |
| 4 | Avenir de Rejiche | 14 | 5 | 5 | 4 | 10 | 10 | 0 | 20 | Qualification for Ranking games |
| 5 | Avenir de Soliman | 14 | 4 | 5 | 5 | 7 | 9 | −2 | 17 | Qualification for Ranking games |

Source: Tunisian Football Federation
Rules for classification: 1) points; 2) head-to-head points; 3) head-to-head goal difference; 4) goal difference; 5) total goals; 6) fairplay ranking; 7) playoff.

==== Results summary ====
| Overall | | | | | | | | Home | | | | | | Away | | | | | |
| Pld | W | D | L | GF | GA | GD | Pts | W | D | L | GF | GA | GD | W | D | L | GF | GA | GD |
|---|---|---|---|---|---|---|---|---|---|---|---|---|---|---|---|---|---|---|---|
| 14 | 5 | 7 | 2 | 14 | 8 | +6 | 22 | 3 | 4 | 0 | 8 | 4 | +4 | 2 | 3 | 2 | 6 | 4 | +2 |

Last updated: 13 April 2022.
Source: Competitive matches

==== Results by round ====
| Round | 1 | 2 | 3 | 4 | 5 | 6 | 7 | 8 | 9 | 10 | 11 | 12 | 13 | 14 |
|---|---|---|---|---|---|---|---|---|---|---|---|---|---|---|
| Ground | A | H | A | H | A | H | A | H | A | H | A | H | A | H |
| Result | D | W | L | D | L | D | D | W | D | D | W | W | W | D |
| Position | 5 | 3 | 4 | 4 | 6 | 7 | 7 | 4 | 4 | 4 | 4 | 4 | 3 | 3 |

Updated to match(es) played on 13 April 2022. Source: Competitive matches
A = Away; H = Home; W = Win; D = Draw; L = Loss

=== Matches ===
Win Draw Loss

| 28 October 2021 Round 2 | Étoile du Sahel | 1–0 | Club Africain | Hammam Sousse |
| 15:30 | Chikhaoui 2' | Report | | Stadium: Stade Bou Ali Lahouar; Attendance: 0 (Note: The match was played behind closed doors due to the COVID-19 pandemic in Tunisia.); Referee: Walid Jridi |

| 31 October 2021 Round 3 | US Monastir | 1–0 | Étoile du Sahel | Monastir |
| 16:30 | Abdelli 23' (pen.) | Report | | Stadium: Stade Mustapha Ben Jannet; Attendance: 0 Referee: Oussema Benisaak |

| 4 November 2021 Round 4 | Étoile du Sahel | 1–1 | ES Zarzis | Hammam Sousse |
| 14:30 | Chikhaoui 33' | Report | Bhar 67' | Stadium: Stade Bou Ali Lahouar; Attendance: 0 Referee: Sadok Selmi |

| 7 November 2021 Round 5 | CS Chebba | 2–0 | Étoile du Sahel | Chebba |
| 14:30 | Zaddem 5' (o.g.); Felhi 27' | Report | | Stadium: Stade de Chebba; Attendance: 0 Referee: Youssef Sraïri |

| 19 November 2021 Round 6 | Étoile du Sahel | 1–1 | AS Rejiche | Hammam Sousse |
| 14:00 | Laouafi 34' | Report | Ben Othmane 76' (pen.) | Stadium: Stade Bou Ali Lahouar; Attendance: 0 Referee: Khaled Gouider |

| 22 November 2021 Round 7 | Olympique Béja | 0–0 | Étoile du Sahel | Béja |
| 14:00 | | Report | | Stadium: Stade Boujemaa Kmiti; Attendance: 0 Referee: Sadok Selmi |

| 25 November 2021 Round 1 | AS Soliman | 0–0 | Étoile du Sahel | Soliman |
| 14:00 | | Report | | Stadium: Stade municipal de Soliman; Attendance: 0 Referee: Nidhal Letaif |

| 2 March 2022 Round 8 | Étoile du Sahel | 2–0 | AS Soliman | Monastir |
| 14:00 | Coulibaly 5'; Ampaw 80' | Report | | Stadium: Stade Mustapha Ben Jannet; Referee: Mehrez Malki |

| 5 March 2022 Round 9 | Club Africain | 1–1 | Étoile du Sahel | Rades |
| 14:00 | Labidi 28' | Report | Kombe 25' | Stadium: Stade Hammadi Agrebi; Referee: Sadok Selmi |

| 9 March 2022 Round 10 | Étoile du Sahel | 0–0 | US Monastir | Kairouan |
| 14:00 | | Report | | Stadium: Stade Hamda Laouani; Referee: Nidhal Letaif |

| 16 March 2022 Round 11 | ES Zarzis | 0–3 | Étoile du Sahel | Zarzis |
| 14:00 | | Report | Boutmène 3'; Kombe 42'; Amri 76' (pen.) | Stadium: Stade Abdessalam Kazouz; Referee: Naim Hosni |

| 6 April 2022 Round 12 | Étoile du Sahel | 1–0 | CS Chebba | Hammam Sousse |
| 13:30 | Amri 90+4' (pen.) | Report | | Stadium: Stade Bou Ali Lahouar; Referee: Nidhal Letaif |

| 10 April 2022 Round 13 | AS Rejiche | 0–2 | Étoile du Sahel | Mahdia |
| 13:30 | | Report | Amri 38' (pen.); Jemmali 50' | Stadium: Stade Ahmed Khouaja |

| 13 April 2022 Round 14 | Étoile du Sahel | 2–2 | Olympique Béja | Hammam Sousse |
| 13:30 | Msakni 6'; Ben Aziza 42' | Report | Bouguerra 49'; Mejri 55' | Stadium: Stade Bou Ali Lahouar |

=== Championship round ===
==== Table ====
| Pos | Team | Pld | W | D | L | GF | GA | GD | Pts | Qualification |
|---|---|---|---|---|---|---|---|---|---|---|
| 2 | Union Monastirienne | 10 | 6 | 2 | 2 | 16 | 9 | +7 | 22 (Note: Club Sfaxien and Union Monastirienne were added 2 points (2nd of the groups in the first round).) | Qualification for Champions League |
| 3 | Club Sfaxien | 10 | 3 | 5 | 2 | 10 | 7 | +3 | 16 | Qualification for Confederation Cup |
| 4 | Club Africain | 10 | 3 | 3 | 4 | 6 | 10 | −4 | 15 (Note: Club Africain and Espérance de Tunis were added 3 points (1st of the groups in the first round).) | Qualification for Confederation Cup |
| 5 | Étoile du Sahel | 10 | 3 | 3 | 4 | 13 | 11 | +2 | 13 (Note: Étoile du Sahel and Union de Ben Guerdane were added 1 point (3rd of the groups in the first round).) | |
| 6 | Union de Ben Guerdane | 10 | 0 | 2 | 8 | 3 | 19 | −16 | 3 | |

Source: Tunisian Football Federation
Rules for classification: 1) points; 2) head-to-head points; 3) head-to-head goal difference; 4) goal difference; 5) total goals; 6) fairplay ranking; 7) playoff.

==== Results summary ====
| Overall | | | | | | | | Home | | | | | | Away | | | | | |
| Pld | W | D | L | GF | GA | GD | Pts | W | D | L | GF | GA | GD | W | D | L | GF | GA | GD |
|---|---|---|---|---|---|---|---|---|---|---|---|---|---|---|---|---|---|---|---|
| 10 | 3 | 3 | 4 | 13 | 11 | +2 | 12 | 1 | 3 | 1 | 7 | 6 | +1 | 2 | 0 | 3 | 6 | 5 | +1 |

Last updated: 26 June 2022.
Source: Competitive matches

==== Results by round ====
| Round | 1 | 2 | 3 | 4 | 5 | 6 | 7 | 8 | 9 | 10 |
|---|---|---|---|---|---|---|---|---|---|---|
| Ground | A | H | H | A | A | H | A | A | H | H |
| Result | W | D | L | L | W | W | L | L | D | D |
| Position | 3 | 3 | 4 | 5 | 3 | 3 | 4 | 5 | 5 | 5 |

First match(es) will be played on 26 June 2022. Source: Competitive matches
A = Away; H = Home; W = Win; D = Draw; L = Loss

| 29 April 2022 Round 1 | US Ben Guerdane | 1–5 | Étoile du Sahel | Monastir |
| 13:30 | Khader 26' | Report | Bouazra 45+2'; Msakni 52'; Kombe 68'; Dhaoui 84'; Abid 90' | Stadium: Stade Mustapha Ben Jannet; Referee: Youssef Sraïri |

| 4 May 2022 Round 2 | Étoile du Sahel | 1–1 | CS Sfaxien | Sousse |
| 17:00 | Amri 63' | Report | Karoui 11' | Stadium: Stade Olympique de Sousse; Referee: Sadok Selmi |

| 7 May 2022 Round 3 | Étoile du Sahel | 2–4 | US Monastir | Sousse |
| 17:00 | Benayada 58' (pen.); Aouani 66' | Report | Ouattara 39'; Aloui 41'; Abdelli 71'; Aholou 75' | Stadium: Stade Olympique de Sousse; Referee: Walid Jridi |

| 15 May 2022 Round 4 | Espérance Sportive de Tunis | 1–0 | Étoile du Sahel | Rades |
| 17:00 | Bouazra 12' (o.g.) | Report | | Stadium: Stade Hammadi Agrebi; Referee: Nidhal Letaif |

| 18 May 2022 Round 5 | Club Africain | 0–1 | Étoile du Sahel | Rades |
| 17:00 | | Report | Azouni 81' (o.g.) | Stadium: Stade Hammadi Agrebi; Referee: Sadok Selmi |

| 22 May 2022 Round 6 | Étoile du Sahel | 3–0 | US Ben Guerdane | Sousse |
| 17:00 | Msakni 35'; Aouani 57'; Dhaoui 86' | Report | | Stadium: Stade Olympique de Sousse; Referee: Karim Khemiri |

| 25 May 2022 Round 7 | CS Sfaxien | 1–0 | Étoile du Sahel | Sfax |
| 17:00 | Harzi 60' | Report | | Stadium: Stade Taïeb Mhiri; Referee: Aymen Nasri |

| 18 June 2022 Round 8 | US Monastir | 2–0 | Étoile du Sahel | Monastir |
| 18:00 | Chikhaoui 84'; Abdelli 90+1' | Report | | Stadium: Stade Mustapha Ben Jannet; Referee: Naim Hosni |

| 23 June 2022 Round 9 | Étoile du Sahel | 1–1 | Espérance Sportive de Tunis | Sousse |
| 18:00 | Benayada 75' | Report | Ben Hammouda 23' | Stadium: Stade Olympique de Sousse; Referee: Nidhal Letaief |

| 26 June 2022 Round 10 | Étoile du Sahel | 0–0 | Club Africain | Sousse |
| 18:00 | | Report | | Stadium: Stade Olympique de Sousse; Referee: Majdi Belhaj Ali |

== Tunisian Cup ==
| 3 June 2022 Round of 32 | Club Africain | 1–0 (a.e.t.) | Étoile du Sahel | Tunis |
| 17:00 | H. Labidi 98' | Report | | Stadium: Stade Hammadi Agrebi; Referee: Nidhal Letaif |

== Champions League ==
=== Second round ===
| 16 October 2021 First leg | APR (Rwanda) | 1–1 | (Tunisia) Étoile du Sahel | Kigali |
| 15:00 UTC+2 | Manishimwe 40' | Report | Meziani 3' | Stadium: Nyamirambo Regional Stadium; Referee: Joshua Bondo (Botswana) |

| 23 October 2021 Second leg | Étoile du Sahel (Tunisia) | 4–0 | (Rwanda) APR | Monastir |
| 14:00 UTC+1 | Chikhaoui 19' (pen.), 47'; Dhaoui 90+3' (pen.); Soumah 90+4' | Report | | Stadium: Stade Mustapha Ben Jannet; Referee: Bakary Gassama (Gambia) |

=== Group stage ===
==== Group C ====
| Pos | Team | Pld | W | D | L | GF | GA | GD | Pts | Qualification | EST | CRB | ESS | GAL |
|---|---|---|---|---|---|---|---|---|---|---|---|---|---|---|
| 1 | (Tunisia) Espérance de Tunis | 6 | 4 | 2 | 0 | 12 | 2 | +10 | 14 | Advance to knockout stage | — | 2–1 | 0–0 | 4–0 |
| 2 | (Algeria) CR Belouizdad | 6 | 3 | 2 | 1 | 10 | 5 | +5 | 11 | Advance to knockout stage | 1–1 | — | 2–0 | 4–1 |
| 3 | (Tunisia) Étoile du Sahel | 6 | 1 | 3 | 2 | 4 | 7 | −3 | 6 | | 0–2 | 0–0 | — | 3–2 |
| 4 | (Botswana) Jwaneng Galaxy | 6 | 0 | 1 | 5 | 5 | 17 | −12 | 1 | | 0–3 | 1–2 | 1–1 | — |

Source: CAF

| 11 February 2022 Matchday 1 | Étoile du Sahel (Tunisia) | 0–0 | (Algeria) CR Belouizdad | Tunis (Note: Étoile du Sahel play their home matches at Stade Hammadi Agrebi, Tunis, instead of their regular home stadium Stade Olympique de Sousse, Sousse, which is undergoing renovation.) |
| 17:00 UTC+1 | | Report | | Stadium: Stade Hammadi Agrebi; Referee: Ibrahim Nour El Din (Egypt) |

| 19 February 2022 Matchday 2 | Jwaneng Galaxy (Botswana) | 1–1 | (Tunisia) Étoile du Sahel | Francistown |
| 18:00 UTC+2 | Sesinyi 90+1' | Report | Coulibaly 14' | Stadium: Francistown Stadium; Referee: Ahmad Imtehaz Heeralall (Mauritius) |

| 26 February 2022 Matchday 3 | Espérance de Tunis (Tunisia) | 0–0 | (Tunisia) Étoile du Sahel | Tunis |
| 14:00 UTC+1 | | Report | | Stadium: Stade Hammadi Agrebi; Referee: Bakary Gassama (Gambia) |

| 12 March 2022 Matchday 4 | Étoile du Sahel (Tunisia) | 0–2 | (Tunisia) Espérance de Tunis | Tunis |
| 14:00 UTC+1 | | Report | Bedrane 66'; Ben Romdhane 77' | Stadium: Stade Hammadi Agrebi; Referee: Mohamed Marouf Eid Mansour (Egypt) |

| 19 March 2022 Matchday 5 | CR Belouizdad (Algeria) | 2–0 | (Tunisia) Étoile du Sahel | Algiers (Note: CR Belouizdad play their group stage home matches at Stade du 5 Juillet, Algiers, instead of their regular home stadium Stade du 20 Août, Algiers, which did not meet CAF requirements.) |
| 20:00 UTC+1 | Bouchar 3'; Belkhir 18' | Report | | Stadium: Stade du 5 Juillet; Referee: Redouane Jiyed (Morocco) |

| 1 April 2022 Matchday 6 | Étoile du Sahel (Tunisia) | 3–2 | (Botswana) Jwaneng Galaxy | Tunis |
| 14:00 UTC+1 | Kombe 9'; Jemmali 70'; Amri 82' | Report | Baruti 80', 85' | Stadium: Stade Hammadi Agrebi; Referee: Messie Nkounkou (Congo) |

== Squad information ==
=== Playing statistics ===
| No. | Pos | Nat | Player | Total | | Ligue 1 | | Tunisian Cup | | Champions League | |
| No. | Pos | Nat | Player | Apps | Goals | Apps | Goals | Apps | Goals | Apps | Goals |
|---|---|---|---|---|---|---|---|---|---|---|---|
| 1 | GK | (Tunisia) TUN | Aymen Mathlouthi | 5 | 0 | 3 | 0 | 0 | 0 | 2 | 0 |
| 30 | GK | (Tunisia) TUN | Ali Jemal | 28 | 0 | 22 | 0 | 0 | 0 | 6 | 0 |
| 16 | GK | (Tunisia) TUN | Rami Gabsi | 1 | 0 | 0 | 0 | 0 | 0 | 1 | 0 |
| 2 | DF | (Tunisia) TUN | Saddam Ben Aziza | 15 | 1 | 13 | 1 | 0 | 0 | 2 | 0 |
| | DF | (Tunisia) TUN | Bahaeddine Sellami | 0 | 0 | 0 | 0 | 0 | 0 | 0 | 0 |
| | DF | (Tunisia) TUN | Salah Harrabi | 0 | 0 | 0 | 0 | 0 | 0 | 0 | 0 |
| | DF | (Tunisia) TUN | Ramez Aouani | 0 | 0 | 0 | 0 | 0 | 0 | 0 | 0 |
| 24 | DF | (Tunisia) TUN | Abdelrazek Bouazra | 10 | 1 | 9 | 1 | 0 | 0 | 1 | 0 |
| 3 | DF | (Tunisia) TUN | Ghofrane Naouali | 14 | 0 | 8 | 0 | 0 | 0 | 6 | 0 |
| 12 | DF | (Tunisia) TUN | Baligh Jemmali | 14 | 2 | 10 | 1 | 0 | 0 | 4 | 1 |
| | DF | (Tunisia) TUN | Houssem Souissi | 0 | 0 | 0 | 0 | 0 | 0 | 0 | 0 |
| 6 | DF | (Algeria) ALG | Houcine Benayada | 23 | 2 | 16 | 2 | 0 | 0 | 7 | 0 |
| | DF | (Tunisia) TUN | Anas Sassi | 0 | 0 | 0 | 0 | 0 | 0 | 0 | 0 |
| 4 | DF | (Tunisia) TUN | Mohamed Kechiche | 9 | 0 | 8 | 0 | 0 | 0 | 1 | 0 |
| | DF | (Tunisia) TUN | Zied Boughattas | 10 | 0 | 10 | 0 | 0 | 0 | 0 | 0 |
| | MF | (Tunisia) TUN | Ayoub Ayed | 0 | 0 | 0 | 0 | 0 | 0 | 0 | 0 |
| 26 | MF | (Cameroon) CMR | Jacques Mbé | 28 | 0 | 21 | 0 | 0 | 0 | 7 | 0 |
| | MF | (Tunisia) TUN | Mohamed Belhaj Mahmoud | 0 | 0 | 0 | 0 | 0 | 0 | 0 | 0 |
| 20 | MF | (Tunisia) TUN | Malek Baayou | 16 | 0 | 11 | 0 | 0 | 0 | 5 | 0 |
| 21 | MF | (Tunisia) TUN | Salaheddine Ghedamsi | 8 | 0 | 5 | 0 | 0 | 0 | 3 | 0 |
| | MF | (Libya) LBA | Abdallah Dagou | 0 | 0 | 0 | 0 | 0 | 0 | 0 | 0 |
| | MF | (Tunisia) TUN | Achref Afli | 0 | 0 | 0 | 0 | 0 | 0 | 0 | 0 |
| 8 | MF | (Tunisia) TUN | Yassine Amri | 28 | 5 | 20 | 4 | 0 | 0 | 8 | 1 |
| | MF | (Tunisia) TUN | Yosri Hamza | 0 | 0 | 0 | 0 | 0 | 0 | 0 | 0 |
| 32 | MF | (Tunisia) TUN | Mohamed Dhaoui | 24 | 3 | 18 | 2 | 0 | 0 | 6 | 1 |
| 18 | MF | (Tunisia) TUN | Fraj Kayramani | 8 | 0 | 4 | 0 | 0 | 0 | 4 | 0 |
| 17 | MF | (Tunisia) TUN | Yassine Chikhaoui | 7 | 4 | 6 | 2 | 0 | 0 | 1 | 2 |
| 23 | MF | (Tunisia) TUN | Oussama Abid | 24 | 1 | 17 | 1 | 0 | 0 | 7 | 0 |
| 35 | MF | (Algeria) ALG | Lyes Benyoucef | 1 | 0 | 0 | 0 | 0 | 0 | 1 | 0 |
| 36 | MF | (Tunisia) TUN | Mohamed Iheb Msakni | 20 | 3 | 14 | 3 | 0 | 0 | 6 | 0 |
| | FW | (Tunisia) TUN | Faik Sik Salem | 0 | 0 | 0 | 0 | 0 | 0 | 0 | 0 |
| 13 | FW | (Algeria) ALG | Youcef Laouafi | 24 | 1 | 18 | 1 | 0 | 0 | 6 | 0 |
| | FW | (Tunisia) TUN | Firas Iffia | 0 | 0 | 0 | 0 | 0 | 0 | 0 | 0 |
| | FW | (Tunisia) TUN | Louay Ben Hassine | 0 | 0 | 0 | 0 | 0 | 0 | 0 | 0 |
| 22 | FW | (Guinea) GUI | Aly Soumah | 8 | 1 | 4 | 0 | 0 | 0 | 4 | 1 |
| | FW | (Tunisia) TUN | Aymen Sfaxi | 0 | 0 | 0 | 0 | 0 | 0 | 0 | 0 |
| 10 | FW | (Algeria) ALG | Zinedine Boutmène | 24 | 1 | 19 | 1 | 0 | 0 | 5 | 0 |
| 39 | FW | (Ivory Coast) CIV | Souleymane Coulibaly | 4 | 1 | 1 | 0 | 0 | 0 | 3 | 1 |
| | FW | (Tunisia) TUN | Imed Louati | 0 | 0 | 0 | 0 | 0 | 0 | 0 | 0 |
| 9 | FW | (Democratic Republic of the Congo) COD | Vinny Kombe | 22 | 4 | 16 | 3 | 0 | 0 | 6 | 1 |
Players transferred out during the season
| | DF | (Algeria) ALG | Boualem Mesmoudi | 8 | 0 | 6 | 0 | 0 | 0 | 2 | 0 |
| | FW | (Algeria) ALG | Tayeb Meziani | 9 | 1 | 7 | 0 | 0 | 0 | 2 | 1 |
| | MF | (Algeria) ALG | Salim Boukhanchouche | 4 | 0 | 3 | 0 | 0 | 0 | 1 | 0 |
| | FW | (Algeria) ALG | Redouane Zerdoum | 0 | 0 | 0 | 0 | 0 | 0 | 0 | 0 |

Source: fr.soccerway.com

=== Goalscorers ===
As of 13 April 2022

Includes all competitive matches. The list is sorted alphabetically by surname when total goals are equal.

| No. | Nat. | Player | Pos. | L 1 | TC | CL 1 | TOTAL |
|---|---|---|---|---|---|---|---|
| 17 | (Tunisia) | Yassine Chikhaoui | FW | 2 | 0 | 2 | 4 |
| 8 | (Tunisia) | Yassine Amri | MF | 3 | 0 | 1 | 4 |
| 9 | (Democratic Republic of the Congo) | Vinny Kombe | FW | 2 | 0 | 1 | 3 |
| 39 | (Ivory Coast) | Souleymane Coulibaly | FW | 1 | 0 | 1 | 2 |
| 12 | (Tunisia) | Baligh Jemmali | DF | 1 | 0 | 1 | 2 |
| 13 | (Algeria) | Youcef Laouafi | FW | 1 | 0 | 0 | 1 |
| | (Algeria) | Tayeb Meziani | FW | 0 | 0 | 1 | 1 |
| 32 | (Tunisia) | Mohamed Dhaoui | MF | 0 | 0 | 1 | 1 |
| 22 | (Guinea) | Aly Soumah | FW | 0 | 0 | 1 | 1 |
| | (Ghana) | Stanley Ampaw | MF | 1 | 0 | 0 | 1 |
| 10 | (Algeria) | Zinedine Boutmène | FW | 1 | 0 | 0 | 1 |
| 36 | (Tunisia) | Mohamed Iheb Msakni | MF | 1 | 0 | 0 | 1 |
| 2 | (Tunisia) | Saddam Ben Aziza | DF | 1 | 0 | 0 | 1 |
| Own Goals | | | | 0 | 0 | 0 | 0 |
| Totals | | | | 14 | 0 | 8 | 22 |

== Transfers ==
=== In ===
| Date | Pos | Player | From club | Transfer fee | Source |
|---|---|---|---|---|---|
| 13 June 2021 | GK | (Tunisia) Ali Jemal | Stade Tunisien | Free transfer | |
| 10 July 2021 | FW | (Democratic Republic of the Congo) Vinny Kombe | Unattached | Free transfer | |
| 1 August 2021 | FW | (Algeria) Youcef Laouafi | (Algeria) ES Sétif | Free transfer | |
| 10 August 2021 | MF | (Tunisia) Imed Louati | (Denmark) Hobro IK | Free transfer | |
| 11 August 2021 | DF | (Algeria) Boualem Mesmoudi | (Algeria) MC Oran | Free transfer | |
| 12 August 2021 | MF | (Algeria) Lyes Benyoucef | Unattached | Free transfer | |
| 12 January 2022 | MF | (Ghana) Stanley Ampaw | (Ghana) Liberty Professionals | Loan for one year | |

=== Out ===
| Date | Pos | Player | To club | Transfer fee | Source |
|---|---|---|---|---|---|
| 2 July 2021 | LB | (Tunisia) Mortadha Ben Ouanes | (Turkey) Kasımpaşa | Free transfer | |
| 2 August 2021 | RB | (Tunisia) Wajdi Kechrida | (Italy) Salernitana 1919 | Free transfer | |
| 5 August 2021 | FW | (Tunisia) Fakhreddine Ouji | US Ben Guerdane | Free transfer | |
| 3 December 2021 | FW | (Algeria) Redouane Zerdoum | Club Africain | Free transfer | |
| 5 January 2022 | DF | (Algeria) Boualem Mesmoudi | Unattached | Free transfer (Released) | |
| 10 January 2022 | FW | (Algeria) Tayeb Meziani | (Saudi Arabia) Abha Club | Undisclosed | |
| 16 January 2022 | MF | (Algeria) Salim Boukhanchouche | (Algeria) JS Kabylie | Free transfer | |
