= 2021–22 Tunisian Cup =

Farhat Hached Cup
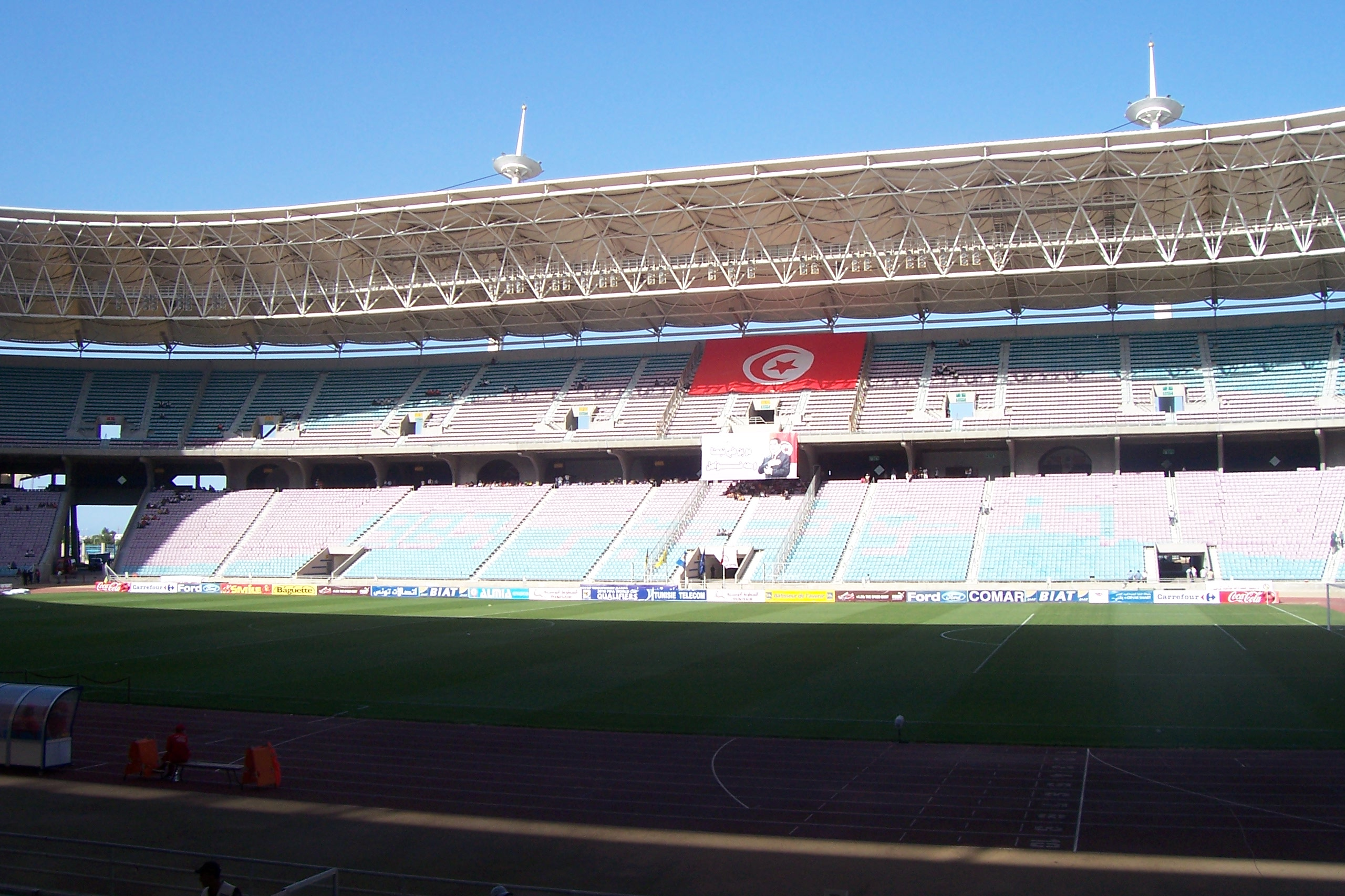
- Stade Hammadi Agrebi hosted the final

Tournament details
- Country: Tunisia

Final positions
- Champions: Club Sfaxien (7th title)
- Runners-up: Avenir de Marsa

Tournament statistics
- Matches played: 29
- Goals scored: 80 (2.76 per match)
- (Note: All statistics do not include preliminary rounds)

The 2021–22 Tunisian Cup (Coupe de Tunisie) or Farhat Hached Cup was the 90th season of the football cup competition of Tunisia. The competition was organized by the Fédération Tunisienne de Football (FTF) and open to all clubs in Tunisia.

== First preliminary round ==
22 January 2022	Espoir de Djerba	Awarded	Avenir de Gabès	Djerba
13:30		Report		Stadium: Stade Municipal de Midoun

22 January 2022	Kalâa Sport	0–1	Stade Tunisien	Kalâa Seghira
13:30		Report	Amri 8'	Stadium: Stade Municipal Kalâa Seghira

22 January 2022	Croissant de M'saken	6–3	El Gawafel de Gafsa	M'saken
13:30	Ben Romdhane 42' (pen.), 44', 45'; Ajroud 60'; Essaafi 78', 80'	Report	Saadouni 25'; Bouhajeb 62' (pen.); Brahmia 90+3'	Stadium: Stade Municipal de M'saken

22 January 2022	Jendouba Sport	0–1	Stade Sfaxien	Jendouba
13:30		Report	Lazez 47'	Stadium: Stade de Jendouba

22 January 2022	Avenir d'Oued Ellil	1–2	Étoile de Radès	Tunis
13:30	S. Jouini 90+2'	Report	H. Jouini 25'; Oueslati 88'	Stadium: Stade Municipal Oued Ellil

22 January 2022	Club de Korba	Awarded	Stade Gabèsien	Korba
13:30		Report		Stadium: Stade de Korba

23 January 2022	Club de Bembla	1–1 (a.e.t.) (6–7 p)	Sfax Railways Sports	Bembla
13:30		Report		Stadium: Bembla Stadium

23 January 2022	Corail de Tabarka	2–1	Avenir de Mohamedia	Tabarka
13:30	Mazni 20'; Souissi 79'	Report	Dallali 2' (pen.)	Stadium: Stade Municipal Tabarka

23 January 2022	Association de Djerba	0–1	Olympique Médenine	Djerba
13:30		Report	Trabelsi 37'	Stadium: Stade Djerba Houmt El Souk

23 January 2022	Olympique des Transports	Awarded	Astre de Menzel Ennour	Tunis
13:30		Report		Stadium: Stade Ali Belhouane

23 January 2022	Sporting Ben Arous	0–1	El Makarem de Mahdia	Tunis
13:30		Report	Amiri 73'	Stadium: Stade de Ben Arous

23 January 2022	Olympique Sidi Bouzid	1–0	Jeunesse Kairouanaise	Sidi Bouzid
13:30	Zaafouri 71'	Report		Stadium: Stade du 17 Décembre

== Second preliminary round ==
29 January 2022	Progrès de Sakiet Eddaier	3–5	Stade Tunisien	Sakiet Eddaïer
13:30		Report		Stadium: Stade Municipal Sakiet Eddaïer

29 January 2022	Badr El Aïn	3–4	El Makarem de Mahdia	El Ain
13:30		Report		Stadium: El Ain Stadium

29 January 2022	Association d'Ettahrir	0–1	Zitouna de Chammakh	Tunis
13:30		Report		Stadium: Stade Cité Ettahrir

29 January 2022	Espérance d'El Krib	0–0 (a.e.t.) (6–5 p)	Olympique Sidi Bouzid	El Krib
13:30		Report		Stadium: Terrain de Football El Krib

29 January 2022	Avenir de Sbikha	2–1	Olympique du Kef	Sbikha
13:30		Report		Stadium: Stade Municipal de Sbikha

29 January 2022	Jeunesse de Magel Bel Abbès	2–0	Club de Korba	Magel Bel Abbès
13:30		Report		Stadium: Stade Magel Bel Abbès

29 January 2022	Croissant de M'saken	3–0	Olympique des Transports	M'saken
13:30		Report		Stadium: Stade Municipal de M'saken

29 January 2022	Corail de Tabarka	Awarded	Olympique Médenine	Tabarka
14:30		Report		Stadium: Stade Municipal Tabarka

30 January 2022	Espoir de Haffouz	2–2 (a.e.t.) (5–4 p)	Astre de Menzel Jemil	Haffouz
13:30		Report		Stadium: Haffouz Municipal

30 January 2022	Hirondelle de Kalâa Kebira	0–1	Étoile du Fahs	Kalâa Kebira
13:30		Report		Stadium: Stade Municipal Kalâa Kebira

30 January 2022	Étoile de Radès	1–1 (a.e.t.) (3–4 p)	Avenir de Marsa	Tunis
13:30		Report		Stadium: Stade Hèdi Ben Romdhane de Radès

30 January 2022	Club de Jebiniana	0–2	Union de Carthage	Jebiniana
13:30		Report		Stadium: Stade Municipal de Jebiniana

30 January 2022	Essor de Sidi Alouane	1–0	Sfax Railways Sports	Mahdia
13:30		Report		Stadium: Stade Ahmed Khouaja

30 January 2022	Club Mejezien	0–0 (a.e.t.) (4–3 p)	Espoir de Djerba	Majaz al Bab
13:30		Report		Stadium: Stade Municipal Majaz al Bab

30 January 2022	Avenir de Kasserine	1–0	Stade Sfaxien	Kasserine
13:30		Report		Stadium: Stade de Kasserine

== Round of 32 ==
The draw for the round of 32 was held on 16 May 2022.

3 June 2022 Match 1	Avenir de Sbikha	1–3	Union de Ben Guerdane	Sbikha
16:00	Othmani 70'	Report	Ouji 47'; Zaidi 54'; Kamergi 57'	Stadium: Stade Municipal de Sbikha; Referee: Wissem Boughattas

1 June 2022 Match 2	Union de Tataouine	3–1	El Makarem de Mahdia	Tataouine
16:00	Ben Hassine 6'; Zoghlami 31'; Khalfa 67' (pen.)	Report	Soussi 77' (pen.)	Stadium: Stade Nejib Khattab; Referee: Amir Ayadi

3 June 2022 Match 3	Club Mejezien	1–3	Union Monastirienne	Majaz al Bab
16:00	Aissani 86'	Report	Ha. Teka 20'; Ho. Teka 43'; Chikhaoui 90'	Stadium: Stade Municipal Majaz al Bab; Referee: Sofiane Ketat

1 June 2022 Match 4	Club de Takelsa	3–3 (a.e.t.) (4–3 p)	Étoile du Fahs	Takelsa
16:00	Hamed 45' (pen.), 98' (pen.); Zenaidi 62'	Report	Rezgui 15'; Bettaieb 82'; Hammami 101'	Stadium: Stade EST; Referee: Walid Ouni
	Penalties
	Maaoui (penalty scored); Bouthouri (penalty missed); Briki (penalty scored); Jelassi (penalty scored); Hamed (penalty scored)		(penalty scored) Jaffali; (penalty missed) Louati; (penalty missed) Dridi; (penalty scored) Bettaieb; (penalty scored) Bouchrid

1 June 2022 Match 5	Avenir de Soliman	1–2	Espérance de Zarzis	Soliman
16:00	Mbarek 61'	Report	Khemiri 80'; Rached 82'	Stadium: Stade municipal de Soliman; Referee: Oussama Ben Ishak

3 June 2022 Match 6	Étoile de Métlaoui	0–3	Club Sfaxien	Métlaoui
16:00		Report	Karoui 55'; Nekkache 72'; Ali 84'	Stadium: Stade Municipal de Métlaoui; Referee: Amir Loussif

1 June 2022 Match 7	Espoir de Hammam Sousse	0–0 (a.e.t.) (2–3 p)	Avenir de Rejiche	Hammam Sousse
16:00		Report		Stadium: Stade Bou Ali Lahouar; Referee: Karim Khemiri
	Penalties
	Soumah (penalty scored); Sassi (penalty missed); Ben Souda (penalty missed); Tritar (penalty scored); Tangour (penalty missed)		(penalty scored) N. Sioud; (penalty scored) M. H. Sioud; (penalty scored) Sabo; (penalty missed) Lamti

1 June 2022 Match 8	Jeunesse de Magel Bel Abbès	Disqualified	Croissant de M'saken	Magel Bel Abbès
16:00	I. Biili 58' (o.g.)	Report	A. Rebai 64' (pen.); Ben Romdhane 86'	Stadium: Stade Magel Bel Abbès; Referee: Jalel Sahbani

3 June 2022 Match 9	Zitouna de Chammakh	0–3	Espérance de Tunis	Zarzis
16:00		Report	Ben Hammouda 31', 51'; Badri 55' (pen.)	Stadium: Stade de Chammakh; Referee: Badis Ben Salah

1 June 2022 Match 10	Club de Hammam-Lif	Awarded	Corail de Tabarka	Tunis
16:00		Report		Stadium: Stade Bou Kornine

2 June 2022 Match 11	Croissant Chebbien	2–0	Olympique Béja	Chebba
16:00	Konaté 5'; Kilangalanga 65'	Report		Stadium: Stade de Chebba; Referee: Ameur Chouchane

2 June 2022 Match 12	Club Bizertin	3–0	Stade Tunisien	Bizerte
16:00	Kchok 3', 54'; Balbouz 84'	Report		Stadium: Stade 15 Octobre; Referee: Oussama Razgallah

3 June 2022 Match 13	Club Africain	1–0 (a.e.t.)	Étoile du Sahel	Tunis
17:00	H. Labidi 98'	Report		Stadium: Stade Hammadi Agrebi; Referee: Nidhal Letaif

2 June 2022 Match 14	Espérance d'El Krib	2–1 (a.e.t.)	Avenir de Kasserine	El Krib
16:00	Boubakri 89' (pen.); Djebbi 120+1'	Report	Achouri 40'	Stadium: Terrain de Football El Krib; Referee: Nabil Hamedi

2 June 2022 Match 15	Avenir de Marsa	4–0	Union de Carthage	Tunis
16:00	Nouioui 7'; Traidi 30', 57'; Ngazou 80' (pen.)	Report		Stadium: Stade Abdelaziz Chtioui; Referee: Hamza Jaid

2 June 2022 Match 16	Espoir de Haffouz	3–1 (a.e.t.)	Essor de Sidi Alouane	Haffouz
16:00	Boulbaba 44'; Rouini 92', 102'	Report	Ben Ali 55'	Stadium: Haffouz Municipal; Referee: Khaled Gouider

== Round of 16 ==
The draw for the round of 16 was held on 16 May 2022 (after the round of 32 draw).

7 June 2022 Match 17	Espérance d'El Krib	1–2	Avenir de Marsa	El Krib
16:00	Babakri 88'	Report	Ngazou 23'; Laabidi 85'	Stadium: Terrain de Football El Krib; Referee: Oussama Cherait

8 June 2022 Match 18	Avenir de Rejiche	2–0	Union Monastirienne	Mahdia
16:00	Lamti 28'; Juma 38'	Report		Stadium: Stade Ahmed Khouaja; Referee: Majdi Belhaj Ali

8 June 2022 Match 19	Union de Tataouine	0–1	Club Sfaxien	Tataouine
16:00		Report	Chebli 41'	Stadium: Stade Nejib Khattab; Referee: Youssef Sraïri

8 June 2022 Match 20	Croissant de M'saken	1–1 (a.e.t.) (6–5 p)	Espérance de Tunis	M'saken
16:00	S. Rebai 75'	Report	Ben Hammouda 56'	Stadium: Stade du Rugby M'saken; Referee: Walid Jeridi
	Penalties
	A. Rebai (penalty scored); Gasmi (penalty scored); F. Ajroudi (penalty scored); Bokri (penalty scored); Ajroudi (penalty missed); Boukadida (penalty scored); I. Biili (penalty scored)		(penalty missed) Ben Hammouda; (penalty scored) Ben Hamida; (penalty scored) Mimouni; (penalty scored) Amamou; (penalty scored) Fedaa; (penalty scored) Chetti; (penalty missed) Chabbar

8 June 2022 Match 21	Club de Takelsa	0–1	Club Africain	Takelsa
16:00		Report	Snana 45'	Stadium: Stade EST; Referee: Haithem Kossi

7 June 2022 Match 22	Club Bizertin	3–0	Club de Hammam-Lif	Bizerte
16:00	Mkaddem 3'; Cheikh 20'; Kchok 84'	Report		Stadium: Stade 15 Octobre; Referee: Fredj Abdellaoui

7 June 2022 Match 23	Croissant Chebbien	2–1 (a.e.t.)	Espérance de Zarzis	Chebba
16:00	Hedhli 1'; Kilangalanga 120'	Report	Gasmi 58' (pen.)	Stadium: Stade de Chebba; Referee: Aymen Nasri

7 June 2022 Match 24	Espoir de Haffouz	1–3	Union de Ben Guerdane	Haffouz
16:00	Hamri 90+2' (pen.)	Report	Rejaibi 6'; Kamergi 45+1'; Tlili 87'	Stadium: Haffouz Municipal; Referee: Walid Mansri

== Quarter-finals ==
The draw for the quarter-finals was held on 16 May 2022 (after the round of 16 draw).

13 June 2022 Match 25	Avenir de Rejiche	2–4 (a.e.t.)	Club Sfaxien	Sousse
16:00	M. H. Sioud 2'; Lamti 35'	Report	Harzi 7'; Ali 82'; Haj Hassen 106'; Chebli 119' (pen.)	Stadium: Stade Olympique de Sousse; Referee: Sadok Selmi

12 June 2022 Match 26	Club Africain	1–0	Croissant Chebbien	Tunis
17:00	Cherifi 87'	Report		Stadium: Stade Hammadi Agrebi; Referee: Majdi Belhaj Ali

15 June 2022 Match 27	Croissant de M'saken	0–2	Avenir de Marsa	Sousse
16:00		Report	Nouioui 8'; Laabidi 33'	Stadium: Stade Olympique de Sousse; Referee: Oussama Razgallah

14 June 2022 Match 28	Club Bizertin	1–1 (a.e.t.) (4–5 p)	Union de Ben Guerdane	Tunis
17:00	Ben Zitoun 68'	Report	Hamed 26'	Stadium: Stade Hammadi Agrebi; Referee: Amir Loussif
	Penalties
	Kchok (penalty missed); Ben Zitoun (penalty scored); Balbouz (penalty scored); Boudrama (penalty scored); Dridi (penalty scored); Samti (penalty missed)		(penalty scored) Ouji; (penalty scored) Ben Khedhr; (penalty scored) Mejri; (penalty scored) Ben Mcharek; (penalty missed) Rejaibi; (penalty scored) Zaidi

== Semi-finals ==
The draw for the semi-finals was held on 27 June 2022.

2 September 2022
18:00

Avenir de Marsa	1–0	Union de Ben Guerdane
Amdouni 14'	Report

Stade Hammadi Agrebi, Tunis
Referee: Ameur Chouchane

4 September 2022
18:00

Club Africain	1–2 (a.e.t.)	Club Sfaxien
Dhaouadi 76' (pen.)	Report	Diakité 82'; Neji 120+3'

Stade Hammadi Agrebi, Tunis
Referee: Haythem Guirat

== Final ==
The final was played on 10 September at Stade Hammadi Agrebi, Tunis.

10 September 2022
18:00

Avenir de Marsa	0–2	Club Sfaxien
	Report	Haj Hassen 9'; Amri 28'

Stade Hammadi Agrebi, Tunis
Attendance: 30,000
Referee: Yosri Bouali

== See also ==
- 2021–22 Tunisian Ligue Professionnelle 1
- 2021–22 Tunisian Ligue Professionnelle 2
