= 2023–24 Tunisian Cup =

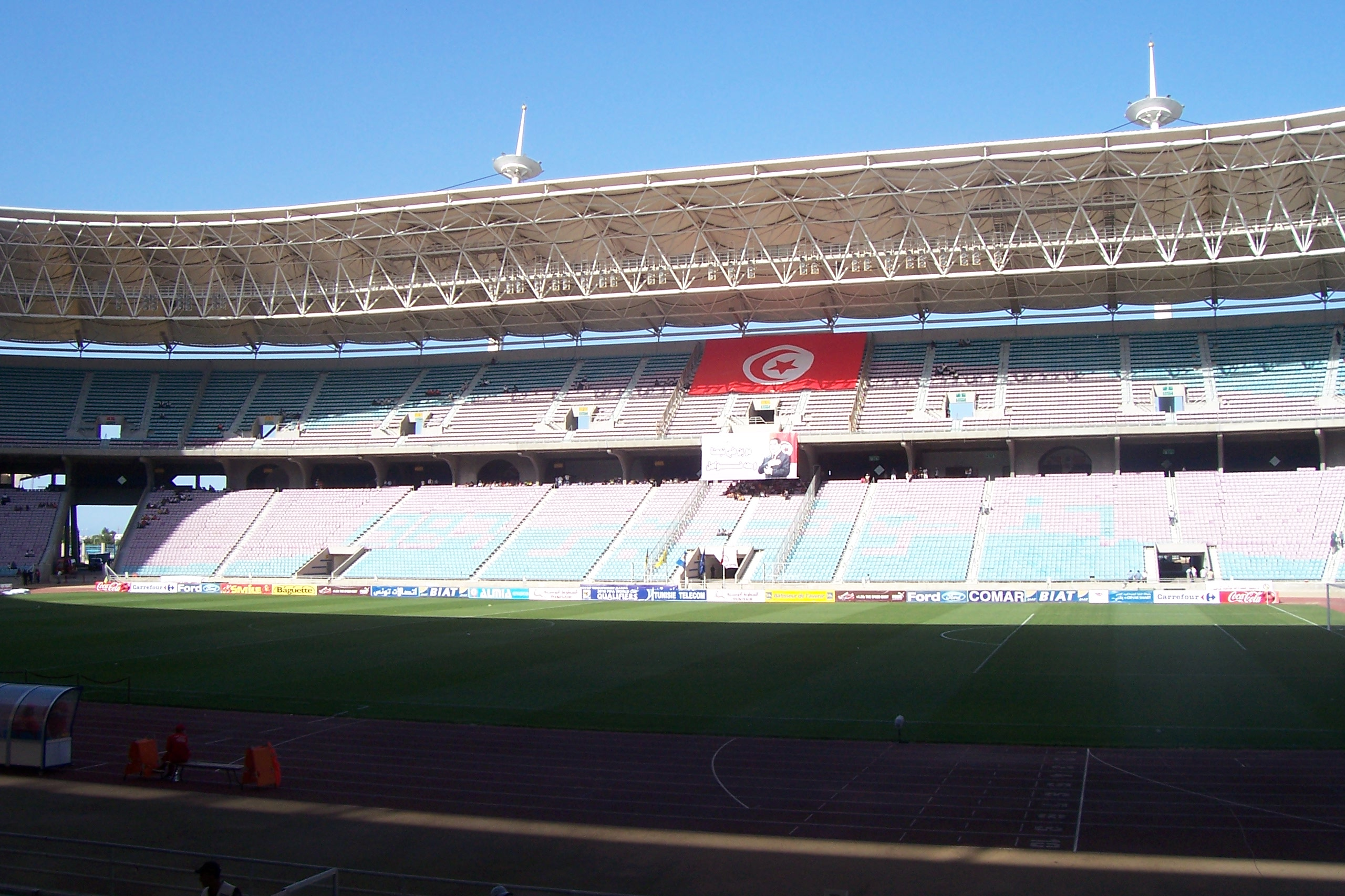
- Stade Hammadi Agrebi hosted the final

Tournament details
- Country: Tunisia

Final positions
- Champions: Stade Tunisien (7th title)
- Runners-up: CA Bizertin

Tournament statistics
- Matches played: 27
- Goals scored: 74 (2.74 per match)
- Top goal scorer: Hamza Khadraoui (6 goals)
- (Note: All statistics start from the round of 32)

The 2023–24 Tunisian Cup (Coupe de Tunisie) was the 92nd season of the football cup competition of Tunisia. The competition was organized by the Tunisian Football Federation and open to all clubs in Tunisia.

== Qualifying round ==
27 January 2024	Kalâa Sport (2)	2–2 (a.e.t.) (4–3 p)	AS d'Ariana (2)	Kalâa Seghira
13:30		Report		Stadium: Stade Municipal Kalâa Seghira

27 January 2024	JS El Omrane (2)	2–0	AS Oued Ellil (2)	Tunis
13:30		Report		Stadium: Complexe Tayeb Ben Ammar

27 January 2024	El Makarem de Mahdia (2)	1–2 (a.e.t.)	AS Gabès (2)	Mahdia
13:30	28'	Report	63'; 94'	Stadium: Stade Ahmed Khouaja

27 January 2024	ES Hammam Sousse (2)	1–2 (a.e.t.)	Sporting Ben Arous (2)	Hammam Sousse
13:30	47'	Report	1'; 101'	Stadium: Stade Bou Ali Lahouar

27 January 2024	AS Rejiche (2)	0–1	Espérance de Zarzis (2)	Rejiche
13:30		Report		Stadium: Stade Municipal de Rejiche

28 January 2024	CS Korba (2)	3–0	AS Jilma (2)	Korba
13:30		Report		Stadium: Stade Municipal de Korba

28 January 2024	OC Kerkennah (2)	2–1	Jendouba Sport (2)	Sfax
13:30		Report		Stadium: Stade du 2 Mars

28 January 2024	Olympique Sidi Bouzid (2)	2–0	CS M'saken (2)	Sidi Bouzid
13:30		Report		Stadium: Stade du 17 Décembre

28 January 2024	CO Médenine (2)	0–0 (a.e.t.) (5–6 p)	CS Chebba (2)	Médenine
13:30		Report		Stadium: Stade Salaheddine Ben Hmida

28 January 2024	CS Hammam-Lif (2)	2–1	Étoile de Radès (2)	Tunis
13:30		Report		Stadium: Stade Bou Kornine

== Third round ==
The draw for the third round was held on 9 February 2024.

25 February 2024	ES Bouchamma (3)	4–1	Sfax RS (3)	Gabès
13:30		Report		Stadium: Stade de Bouchamma

25 February 2024	ES El Aloui (4)	2–1	FC Mdhila (3)	Alaâ
13:30		Report		Stadium: Stade Municipal d'Alaâ

25 February 2024	US Ksibet El Mediouni (3)	1–0	Kalâa Sport (2)	Ksibet El Mediouni
13:30		Report		Stadium: Stade Municipal de Ksibet El Mediouni

25 February 2024	CS Takelsa (4)	1–1 (a.e.t.) (3–4 p)	CS Chebba (2)	Takelsa
13:30		Report		Stadium: Stade CST

25 February 2024	ES Jerba (2)	1–0	US Ksour Essef (3)	Djerba
13:30		Report		Stadium: Midoun Municipal Stadium

25 February 2024	AS Ain Jloula (4)	0–1	Sporting Ben Arous (2)	Aïn Djeloula
13:30		Report		Stadium: Stade Municipal d'Aïn Djeloula

25 February 2024	AS Mohamedia (3)	2–1 (a.e.t.)	Olympique des Transports (3)	Tunis
13:30		Report		Stadium: Stade de Mohamedia

25 February 2024	CS Ouerdanin (4)	0–5	JS El Omrane (2)	Ouerdanin
13:30		Report		Stadium: Stade Olympique d'Ouerdanin

25 February 2024	OC Kerkennah (2)	2–1	Olympique Sidi Bouzid (2)	Sfax
13:30		Report		Stadium: Stade du 2 Mars

25 February 2024	CS Hammam-Lif (2)	1–1 (a.e.t.) (3–4 p)	SC Moknine (2)	Tunis
13:30		Report		Stadium: Stade Bou Kornine

25 February 2024	JS Kairouan (2)	0–0 (a.e.t.) (3–4 p)	Espérance de Zarzis (2)	Kairouan
13:30		Report		Stadium: Stade Hamda Laouani

25 February 2024	PS Sakiet Eddaïer (3)	1–0	US Bou Salem (3)	Sakiet Eddaïer
13:30		Report		Stadium: Stade Municipal de Sakiet Eddaïer

25 February 2024	FS Menzel Kamel (4)	1–0	AS Menzel Ennour (4)	Menzel Kamel
13:30		Report		Stadium: Stade de Menzel Kamel

25 February 2024	JS Manouba (4)	1–2	CS Korba (2)	Tunis
13:30		Report		Stadium: Stade de Manouba

25 February 2024	AS Degache (4)	1–2	AS Gabès (2)	Degache
13:30		Report		Stadium: Stade de Degache

25 February 2024	ES Hamet Jerid (4)	0–1	Ahly Sfaxien (3)	Hamet Jerid
13:30		Report		Stadium: Stade Olympique de Hamet Jerid

25 February 2024	AS El Hamma (4)	2–1	US Ajim Djerba (3)	El Hamma
13:30		Report		Stadium: Stade d'El Hamma

25 February 2024	JS Bou Merdes (4)	0–1	ES Tazerka (3)	Bou Merdes
13:30		Report		Stadium: Stade de Bou Merdes

== Round of 32 ==
The draw for the round of 32 was held on 9 February 2024 (after the third round draw).

19 April 2024	AS El Hamma (4)	0–1	EGS Gafsa (1)	El Hamma
14:30		Report	Omrani 45' (pen.)	Stadium: Stade d'El Hamma; Referee: Walid Ouni

19 April 2024	AS Mohamedia (3)	1–2	CA Bizertin (1)	Tunis
14:30	Dridi 63'	Report	Ben Hassine 33'; Khelifi 34'	Stadium: Stade de Mohamedia; Referee: Hosni Nebli

19 April 2024	CS Sfaxien (1)	0–1 (a.e.t.)	AS Marsa (1)	Sfax
17:30		Report	Smichi 96'	Stadium: Stade Taïeb Mhiri; Referee: Mahmoud Ksiaa

20 April 2024	Espérance de Zarzis (2)	0–3	Stade Tunisien (1)	Zarzis
14:30		Report	Ayadi 45' (pen.); Khadraoui 77'; Mejri 80'	Stadium: Stade Abdessalam Kazouz; Referee: Nidhal Letaief

20 April 2024	PS Sakiet Eddaïer (3)	1–0	ES Tazarka (3)	Sakiet Eddaïer
14:30	Aboub 86'	Report		Stadium: Stade Municipal de Sakiet Eddaïer; Referee: Hamza Msilini

20 April 2024	Ahly Sfaxien (3)	3–0	US Ksibet El Mediouni (3)	Sfax
14:30	Achich 76', 90+6'; Ghorbal 88'	Report		Stadium: Stade du 2 Mars; Referee: Hassen Selmi

21 April 2024	ES Métlaoui (1)	2–2 (a.e.t.) (2–4 p)	US Monastir (1)	Métlaoui
14:30	Mohamadi 90+5'; Ouji 107'	Report	Jafeli 78', 100'	Stadium: Stade Municipal de Métlaoui; Referee: Walid Mansri

21 April 2024	FS Menzel Kamel (4)	1–3	Olympique Béja (1)	Menzel Kamel
14:30		Report	Derbali 9'; Homri 52' (pen.); Chihi 59'	Stadium: Stade de Menzel Kamel; Referee: Ali Mokhtar

21 April 2024	AS Soliman (1)	0–2 (a.e.t.)	AS Gabès (2)	Soliman
14:30		Report	Mansour 107'; Helal 120+1' (o.g.)	Stadium: Stade Municipal de Soliman; Referee: Bacem Belaid

21 April 2024	CS Chebba (2)	0–1	ES Jerba (2)	Chebba
14:30		Report	Waili 77'	Stadium: Stade de Chebba; Referee: Nizar Riahi

21 April 2024	US Ben Guerdane (1)	1–1 (a.e.t.) (3–5 p)	Club Africain (1)	Ben Guerdane
14:30	Chaabane 47'	Report	Bikoro 57'	Stadium: Stade du 7 Mars; Referee: Houssem Boularesse
	Penalties
	Abderrazzak (penalty scored); Sioud (penalty scored); Habbassi (penalty scored); Zid (penalty missed)		(penalty scored) Eduwo; (penalty scored) Arfaoui; (penalty scored) Khalil; (penalty scored) Zaalouni; (penalty scored) Taous

21 April 2024	ES Bouchamma (3)	0–1 (a.e.t.)	Étoile du Sahel (1)	Gabès
14:30		Report	Jertila 120+2'	Stadium: Stade de Bouchamma; Referee: Majdi Bellagha

21 April 2024	SC Moknine (2)	2–4 (a.e.t.)	Sporting Ben Arous (2)	Moknine
14:30	Ben Amer 13'; Sioud 59'	Report	Boubakri 61', 74'; Mejri 112'; Lahrizi 119' (pen.)	Stadium: Stade Mongi Slim; Referee: Mohamed Amine Aifi

21 April 2024	JS El Omrane (2)	1–0 (a.e.t.)	US Tataouine (1)	Tunis
14:30	Beji 111'	Report		Stadium: Complexe Tayeb Ben Ammar; Referee: Jalel Sahbani

21 April 2024	ES El Aloui (4)	0–2	CS Korba (2)	Korba
14:30		Report	Bouzid 17'; Lachheb 39'	Stadium: Stade Municipal de Korba; Referee: Fedi Boukhris

8 May 2024	OC Kerkennah (2)	2–1 (a.e.t.)	Espérance de Tunis (1)	Sfax
14:30	Moussa 69'; Zitouni 112'	Report	Meriah 89' (pen.)	Stadium: Stade Taïeb Mhiri; Referee: Haythem Kossai

== Round of 16 ==
The draw for the round of 16 was held on 3 May 2024.

17 May 2024	CS Korba (2)	1–2	Club Africain (1)	Korba
14:30	Salah 9'	Report	Ghrissi 55'; Sghaier 72'	Stadium: Stade Municipal de Korba; Referee: Amir Ayadi

17 May 2024	OC Kerkennah (2)	0–2	AS Marsa (1)	Sfax
14:30		Report	O. Traidi 7'; Karoui 29'	Stadium: Stade Taïeb Mhiri; Referee: Fredj Abdellaoui

17 May 2024	EGS Gafsa (1)	1–6	Stade Tunisien (1)	Gafsa
14:30	Bangoura 81' (pen.)	Report	Agbre 41' (o.g.); Khadraoui 45', 51', 73'; Mejri 70'; Oumarou 90+3'	Stadium: Stade Olympique de Gafsa; Referee: Mahmoud Ksiaa

18 May 2024	Ahly Sfaxien (3)	0–1	Étoile du Sahel (1)	Sfax
14:30		Report	Barhoumi 72'	Stadium: Stade Cité El Habib; Referee: Mourad Jerbi

19 May 2024	Sporting Ben Arous (2)	2–2 (a.e.t.) (4–3 p)	JS El Omrane (2)	Tunis
14:30	Mejri 82'; Sebii 84' (pen.)	Report	Ben Rejeb 48' (pen.); Salhi 56' (pen.)	Stadium: Stade Municipal de Ben Arous; Referee: Ali Mokhtar
	Penalties
	Melliti (penalty missed); Ben Atallah (penalty scored); Sebii (penalty scored); Menif (penalty scored); Mejri (penalty scored)		(penalty scored) Souissi; (penalty scored) Ben Ameur; (penalty missed) Ouannes; (penalty missed) Akremi; (penalty scored) Machraoui

19 May 2024	PS Sakiet Eddaïer (3)	1–2 (a.e.t.)	CA Bizertin (1)	Sakiet Eddaïer
14:30	Attia 74'	Report	Ben Othman 86'; Mechergui 120'	Stadium: Stade Municipal de Sakiet Eddaïer; Attendance: 0 (close doors); Referee: Naim Hosni

19 May 2024	US Monastir (1)	2–0	AS Gabès (2)	Monastir
14:30	Baccar 82'; Ouerfelli 89'	Report		Stadium: Stade Mustapha Ben Jannet; Attendance: 0 (close doors); Referee: Achref Harakati

19 May 2024	Olympique Béja (1)	2–1 (a.e.t.)	ES Jerba (2)	Tunis
14:30	Hadouchi 59'; Homri 120' (pen.)	Report	Zendah 63'	Stadium: Stade Chedly Zouiten; Referee: Mohamed Ali Karouia

== Quarter-finals ==
The draw for the quarter-finals was held on 3 May 2024 (after the round of 16 draw).

21 June 2024	CA Bizertin (1)	1–0 (a.e.t.)	Sporting Ben Arous (2)	Bizerte
17:00	Bouallegui 120+10' (pen.)	Report		Stadium: Stade du 15 Octobre; Referee: Abdelhamid Badreddine

22 June 2024	Olympique Béja (1)	3–2 (a.e.t.)	AS Marsa (1)	Tunis
16:00	Sissoko 66'; Homri 90+5'; Absi 93'	Report	Bousnina 79'; O. Traidi 89' (pen.)	Stadium: Stade Chedly Zouiten; Referee: Amir Ayadi

23 June 2024	Étoile du Sahel (1)	2–4 (a.e.t.)	Stade Tunisien (1)	Sousse
16:00	Ben Hassine 44'; Jelassi 69'	Report	Jouini 3', 100'; Ben Abda 50'; Ben Njima 94' (o.g.)	Stadium: Stade Olympique de Sousse; Referee: Seif Ouertani

23 June 2024	US Monastir (1)	1–2	Club Africain (1)	Monastir
19:00	Jebali 33'	Report	Souissi 29'; Srarfi 76'	Stadium: Stade Mustapha Ben Jannet; Referee: Oussama Ben Ishak

== Semi-finals ==
The draw for the semi-finals was held on 23 June 2024. All the teams that qualified for the semi-finals were from the Tunisian Ligue Professionnelle 1 for the 2nd time in a row.

26 June 2024
16:00

Olympique Béja	1–4	Stade Tunisien
Bouabid 45+7'	Report	Jouini 16' (pen.); Oumarou 30'; Khadraoui 48', 65'

Stade Chedly Zouiten, Tunis
Referee: Amir Loussif

Stade Tunisien qualified for the final.

26 June 2024
17:00

CA Bizertin	2–1 (a.e.t.)	Club Africain
Ben Zitoun 68'; A. Ferchichi 93'	Report	H. Labidi 90'

Stade du 15 Octobre, Bizerte
Referee: Ameur Chouchane

CA Bizertin qualified for the final.

== Final ==
The final was played on 30 June 2024 at Stade Hammadi Agrebi, Tunis.

30 June 2024
17:00

Stade Tunisien	2–0	CA Bizertin
Mejri 32'; Jouini 57'	Report

Stade Hammadi Agrebi, Tunis
Referee: Seif Ouertani

== Controversies ==
On 7 February 2024, the Tunisian Football Federation named the Tunisian Cup The His Excellency the President of the Republic Cup, before the start of the 2023–24 edition, returning the name of the competition to what it was before the Tunisian revolution. This decision sparked public controversy. On 9 February, President Kais Saied, during his meeting with Minister of Youth and Sports Kamel Deguiche, decided to change the name of the tournament to the Tunisian Cup and rejected the new name, indicating that the era of personalization of power had passed forever. The report was published on the official page of the Presidency of the Republic on Facebook. After that, the TFF retracted the new name and kept the name of the Tunisian Cup.

== See also ==
- 2023–24 Tunisian Ligue Professionnelle 1
- 2023–24 Tunisian Ligue Professionnelle 2
- 2023–24 Tunisian Super Cup
