= Chaouki =

Chaouki is an Arabic masculine given name. Notable people with the name include:

== First name ==
- Chaouki Abdallah, Lebanese-American engineer and academic
- Chaouki Chamoun (born 1942), Lebanese artist
- Chaouki Dries (born 1981), Algerian rower
- Chaouki Ben Khader (born 2001), Tunisian football player
- Chaouki Ben Saada (born 1984), Tunisian football player
- Chaouki Sammari (born 1972), Tunisian wrestler

== Middle name ==
- Mohammed Chaouki Zine (born 1972), Algerian philosopher and writer
