= Rezgui =

Rezgui is a surname that derives from رزقي, which means my living or my supper in Arabic. It may refer to:

- Rakia Rezgui (born 1996), Tunisian handball player
- Wassim Rezgui (born 1986), Tunisian football player
- Seifeddine Rezgui, alleged perpetrator of the 2015 Sousse attacks

== See also ==
- Monder Rizki
