= 2021–22 Tunisian Ligue Professionnelle 1 =

Tunisian Ligue Professionnelle 1
- Season: 2021–22
- Dates: 16 October 2021 – 26 June 2022
- Champions: Espérance de Tunis (32nd title)
- Relegated: Espérance de Zarzis; Club de Hammam-Lif (Note: See The Club Africain v Croissant Chebbien match case.)
- Champions League: Espérance de Tunis; Union Monastirienne
- Confederation Cup: Club Sfaxien; Club Africain (Note: Since the 2021–22 Tunisian Cup did not end before the lists of clubs participating in the African competitions were handed over to the CAF, Club Africain qualified for the 2022–23 CAF Confederation Cup.)
- Matches: 156
- Goals: 265 (1.7 per match)
- Top goalscorer: Mohamed Ali Ben Hammouda (10 goals)
- Biggest home win: Espérance de Tunis 4–0 Club Bizertin (9 March 2022)
- Biggest away win: Union de Ben Guerdane 1–5 Étoile du Sahel (29 April 2022)
- Highest scoring: Union de Tataouine 5–3 Avenir de Rejiche (15 May 2022)
- Longest winning run: Espérance de Tunis (4 matches)
- Longest unbeaten run: Étoile du Sahel (11 matches)
- Longest winless run: Union de Ben Guerdane (14 matches)
- Longest losing run: Union de Ben Guerdane (6 matches)

The 2021–22 Tunisian Ligue Professionnelle 1 (Tunisian Professional League) season was the 67th season of top-tier football in Tunisia.

Espérance de Tunis were the defending champions and successfully defended their title, winning their record-extending 6th consecutive title and 32nd title overall.

The VAR was used in the playoff.

== Teams ==
A total of 16 teams contested the league.

=== Stadiums and locations ===
Locations of the 2021–22 Ligue 1 teams

Team	Location	Stadium	Capacity
Avenir de Rejiche	Mahdia	Stade Ahmed Khouaja	3,000
Avenir de Soliman	Soliman	Stade Municipal de Soliman	3,000
Club Africain	Tunis (Bab Jedid)	Stade Hammadi Agrebi	60,000
Club Bizertin	Bizerte	Stade 15 Octobre	20,000
Croissant Chebbien	Chebba	Stade de Chebba	3,000
Club de Hammam-Lif	Tunis (Hammam-Lif)	Stade Bou Kornine	15,000
Club Sfaxien	Sfax	Stade Taïeb Mhiri	22,000
Espoir de Hammam Sousse	Hammam Sousse	Stade Bou Ali Lahouar	6,500
Étoile de Métlaoui	Métlaoui	Stade Municipal de Métlaoui	6,000
Étoile du Sahel	Sousse	Stade Olympique de Sousse	42,000
Espérance de Tunis	Tunis (Bab Souika)	Stade Hammadi Agrebi	60,000
Espérance de Zarzis	Zarzis	Stade Abdessalam Kazouz	7,000
Olympique Béja	Béja	Boujemaa Kmiti Stadium	15,500
Union de Ben Guerdane	Ben Guerdane	Stade du 7 Mars	10,000
Union Monastirienne	Monastir	Stade Mustapha Ben Jannet	20,000
Union de Tataouine	Tataouine	Stade Municipal Bir Lahmar	5,000

=== Return of Croissant Chebbien ===
On 11 September 2021, Croissant Chebbien returned to the league following a vote by the Ordinary General Assembly of the Tunisian Football Federation.

== Competition ==
=== First round ===
==== Group A ====
===== Table =====
Pos	Team	Pld	W	D	L	GF	GA	GD	Pts	Qualification or relegation
1	Espérance de Tunis	14	8	3	3	20	7	+13	27	Advance to Playoff
2	Club Sfaxien	14	6	3	5	12	10	+2	21	Advance to Playoff
3	Union de Ben Guerdane	14	5	6	3	10	8	+2	21	Advance to Playoff
4	Union de Tataouine	14	6	3	5	13	15	−2	21	Qualification for Ranking games
5	Club Bizertin	14	6	1	7	13	15	−2	19	Qualification for Ranking games
6	Étoile de Métlaoui	14	4	5	5	11	15	−4	17	Qualification for Playout
7	Espoir de Hammam Sousse	14	3	7	4	11	11	0	16	Qualification for Playout
8	Club de Hammam-Lif (R)	14	2	4	8	9	18	−9	10	Relegation to Ligue 2

Source: Tunisian Football Federation
Rules for classification: 1) points; 2) head-to-head points; 3) head-to-head goal difference; 4) goal difference; 5) total goals; 6) fairplay ranking; 7) playoff.
(R) Relegated

===== Results =====
Home \ Away	CAB	CSHL	CSS	ESHS	ESM	EST	USBG	UST
Club Bizertin		2–0	2–0	0–0	1–0	1–2	1–2	0–1
Club de Hammam-Lif	0–1		1–2	0–0	0–0	2–1	0–0	1–2
Club Sfaxien	1–2	2–0		1–1	2–0	1–0	0–1	1–0
Espoir de Hammam Sousse	1–0	2–1	0–0		1–1	0–1	1–1	3–1
Étoile de Métlaoui	2–1	2–2	2–1	1–0		1–2	0–0	1–0
Espérance de Tunis	4–0	2–0	1–0	0–0	3–0		0–0	3–0
Union de Ben Guerdane	0–1	1–2	0–1	2–1	1–0	0–0		0–0
Union de Tataouine	2–1	1–0	0–0	2–1	1–1	2–1	1–2	

Source: Tunisian Football Federation
Legend: Blue = home team win; Yellow = draw; Red = away team win.
For upcoming matches, an "a" indicates there is an article about the rivalry between the two participants.

===== Clubs season-progress =====
Team ╲ Round	1	2	3	4	5	6	7	8	9	10	11	12	13	14
CAB	L	D	L	W	W	W	L	L	L	L	W	L	W	W
CSHL	W	L	L	L	L	D	L	D	L	D	L	W	D	L
CSS	W	L	W	W	D	L	W	L	W	L	D	D	L	W
ESHS	L	D	W	L	D	L	W	D	W	D	D	D	D	L
ESM	L	D	D	W	L	D	L	W	L	W	D	W	D	L
EST	W	W	W	D	W	L	W	D	L	W	D	L	W	W
USBG	L	D	L	D	W	W	W	D	W	W	D	D	D	L
UST	W	W	D	L	L	W	L	W	W	L	D	D	L	W

Source: Tunisian Football Federation
W = Win; D = Draw; L = Lose

==== Group B ====
===== The Club Africain v Croissant Chebbien match case =====
On 18 April 2022, the match of the last round was held between Club Africain and Croissant Chebbien at Stade Hammadi Agrebi, Tunis and ended with a 1–0 win for the hosts, a result that made Croissant Chebbien relegated to the Ligue 2, but Croissant Chebbien protested the presence of Club Africain president, Youssef Elmi, on the bench despite his suspension from punishment by the Football Federation, and demanded that they would be given a penal victory, and they decided to take the case to CAS.

On 29 September, the CAS decided to reintegrate Croissant Chebbien in the Ligue 1, which forced the federation to add a 16th team for 2022–23 season so that the number of teams would be even, and the identity of this team was determined by two playoff matches, the first between Club de Hammam-Lif and Espérance de Zarzis, and the second between the winner of the first match and Étoile de Métlaoui.

On 27 March 2023, the CAS decided to give Croissant Chebbien a 2–0 penal victory. Since this decision affects the arrangement of the table in the first round and the added points for the coronation playoff and playout, and since this decision came late and after the start of the new season, the effect of this result in the second round was not calculated.

===== Table before CAS decision =====
Pos	Team	Pld	W	D	L	GF	GA	GD	Pts	Qualification or relegation
1	Club Africain	14	7	4	3	11	6	+5	25	Advance to Playoff
2	Union Monastirienne	14	6	5	3	8	5	+3	23	Advance to Playoff
3	Étoile du Sahel	14	5	7	2	14	8	+6	22	Advance to Playoff
4	Avenir de Rejiche	14	5	5	4	10	10	0	20	Qualification for Ranking games
5	Avenir de Soliman	14	4	5	5	7	9	−2	17	Qualification for Ranking games
6	Olympique Béja	14	4	4	6	9	10	−1	16	Qualification for Playout
7	Espérance de Zarzis	14	3	4	7	6	13	−7	13	Qualification for Playout
8	Croissant Chebbien (R)	14	3	4	7	6	10	−4	13	Relegation to Ligue 2

Source: Tunisian Football Federation
Rules for classification: 1) points; 2) head-to-head points; 3) head-to-head goal difference; 4) goal difference; 5) total goals; 6) fairplay ranking; 7) playoff.
(R) Relegated

===== Table after CAS decision =====
Pos	Team	Pld	W	D	L	GF	GA	GD	Pts	Qualification or relegation
1	Union Monastirienne	14	6	5	3	8	5	+3	23	Advance to Playoff
2	Étoile du Sahel	14	5	7	2	14	8	+6	22	Advance to Playoff
3	Club Africain	14	6	4	4	10	8	+2	22	Advance to Playoff
4	Avenir de Rejiche	14	5	5	4	10	10	0	20	Qualification for Ranking games
5	Avenir de Soliman	14	4	5	5	7	9	−2	17	Qualification for Ranking games
6	Croissant Chebbien	14	4	4	6	8	9	−1	16	Qualification for Playout
7	Olympique Béja	14	4	4	6	9	10	−1	16	Qualification for Playout
8	Espérance de Zarzis	14	3	4	7	6	13	−7	13	Relegation to Ligue 2

Source: Tunisian Football Federation
Rules for classification: 1) points; 2) head-to-head points; 3) head-to-head goal difference; 4) goal difference; 5) total goals; 6) fairplay ranking; 7) playoff.

===== Results =====
Home \ Away	ASR	ASS	CA	CSCH	ESS	ESZ	OB	USM
Avenir de Rejiche		2–2	0–1	1–0	0–2	1–0	0–0	0–1
Avenir de Soliman	1–0		1–0	1–0	0–0	2–1	0–1	0–0
Club Africain	1–1	1–0		0–2 (Note: Awarded)	1–1	1–0	1–0	2–0
Croissant Chebbien	0–1	0–0	1–1		2–0	0–0	1–0	0–0
Étoile du Sahel	1–1	2–0	1–0	1–0		1–1	2–2	0–0
Espérance de Zarzis	0–0	0–0	0–1	2–1	0–3		0–2	0–1
Olympique Béja	1–2	1–0	1–0	0–1	0–0	0–1		0–0
Union Monastirienne	0–1	1–0	0–0	2–0	1–0	0–1	2–1	

Source: Tunisian Football Federation
Legend: Blue = home team win; Yellow = draw; Red = away team win.
For upcoming matches, an "a" indicates there is an article about the rivalry between the two participants.

===== Clubs season-progress =====
Team ╲ Round	1	2	3	4	5	6	7	8	9	10	11	12	13	14
ASR	D	L	D	W	W	D	D	L	W	W	W	D	L	L
ASS	D	L	L	D	D	W	D	L	L	W	L	W	D	W
CA	D	L	W	W	D	W	D	W	D	L	L	W	W	L
CSCH	L	D	W	L	W	L	D	D	L	W	L	L	D	W
ESS	D	W	L	D	L	D	D	W	D	D	W	W	W	D
ESZ	L	D	D	D	D	L	L	W	W	L	L	L	L	W
OB	W	W	L	L	L	L	D	L	W	L	W	D	D	D
USM	W	W	W	D	D	W	W	D	L	D	W	L	D	L

Source: Tunisian Football Federation
W = Win; D = Draw; L = Lose

==== Goals scored per round ====
This graph represents the number of goals scored during each round:

=== Playoff ===
==== Table ====
Pos	Team	Pld	W	D	L	GF	GA	GD	Pts	Qualification
1	Espérance de Tunis (C)	10	6	3	1	16	8	+8	24 (Note: Club Africain and Espérance de Tunis were added 3 points (1st of the groups in the first round).)	Qualification for Champions League
2	Union Monastirienne	10	6	2	2	16	9	+7	22 (Note: Club Sfaxien and Union Monastirienne were added 2 points (2nd of the groups in the first round).)	Qualification for Champions League
3	Club Sfaxien	10	3	5	2	10	7	+3	16	Qualification for Confederation Cup
4	Club Africain	10	3	3	4	6	10	−4	15	Qualification for Confederation Cup
5	Étoile du Sahel	10	3	3	4	13	11	+2	13 (Note: Étoile du Sahel and Union de Ben Guerdane were added 1 point (3rd of the groups in the first round).)	
6	Union de Ben Guerdane	10	0	2	8	3	19	−16	3	

Source: Tunisian Football Federation
Rules for classification: 1) points; 2) head-to-head points; 3) head-to-head goal difference; 4) goal difference; 5) total goals; 6) fairplay ranking; 7) playoff.
(C) Champions

==== Results ====
Home \ Away	CA	CSS	ESS	EST	USBG	USM
Club Africain		0–0	0–1	0–0	2–1	2–1
Club Sfaxien	3–0		1–0	1–1	0–0	2–2
Étoile du Sahel	0–0	1–1		1–1	3–0	2–4
Espérance de Tunis	3–1	2–1	1–0		2–1	1–0
Union de Ben Guerdane	0–1	0–1	1–5	0–3		0–2
Union Monastirienne	1–0	1–0	2–0	3–2	0–0	

Source: Tunisian Football Federation
Legend: Blue = home team win; Yellow = draw; Red = away team win.
For upcoming matches, an "a" indicates there is an article about the rivalry between the two participants.

==== Positions by round ====
The table lists the positions of teams after each week of matches. In order to preserve chronological evolvements, any postponed matches are not included to the round at which they were originally scheduled, but added to the full round they were played immediately afterwards.

Team ╲ Round	1	2	3	4	5	6	7	8	9	10
Club Africain	4	2	3	4	5	4	3	4	4	4
Club Sfaxien	5	5	5	3	4	5	4	3	3	3
Étoile du Sahel	3	3	4	5	3	3	5	5	5	5
Espérance de Tunis	1	1	1	1	1	1	1	1	1	1
Union de Ben Guerdane	6	6	6	6	6	6	6	6	6	6
Union Monastirienne	2	4	2	2	2	2	2	2	2	2

Leader
2022–23 CAF Champions League
2022–23 CAF Confederation Cup

Source: Tunisian Football Federation

==== Clubs season-progress ====
Team ╲ Round	1	2	3	4	5	6	7	8	9	10
Club Africain	L	W	D	L	L	W	W	L	D	D
Club Sfaxien	L	D	D	W	L	D	W	W	D	D
Étoile du Sahel	W	D	L	L	W	W	L	L	D	D
Espérance de Tunis	W	W	D	W	W	D	L	W	D	W
Union de Ben Guerdane	L	L	D	D	L	L	L	L	L	L
Union Monastirienne	W	L	W	D	W	L	W	W	W	D

Source: Tunisian Football Federation
W = Win; D = Draw; L = Lose

==== Goals scored per round ====
This graph represented the number of goals scored during each round:

=== Playout ===
==== Table ====
Pos	Team	Pld	W	D	L	GF	GA	GD	Pts	Relegation
1	Espoir de Hammam Sousse	6	2	3	1	6	5	+1	9	
2	Olympique Béja	6	2	2	2	5	2	+3	9 (Note: Étoile de Métlaoui and Olympique Béja were added 1 point (6th of the groups in the first round).)	
3	Étoile de Métlaoui	6	2	2	2	5	6	−1	9	Relegation to Ligue 2
4	Espérance de Zarzis (R)	6	1	3	2	4	7	−3	6	Relegation to Ligue 2

Source: Tunisian Football Federation
Rules for classification: 1) points; 2) head-to-head points; 3) head-to-head goal difference; 4) goal difference; 5) total goals; 6) fairplay ranking; 7) playoff.
(R) Relegated

==== Results ====
Home \ Away	ESHS	ESM	ESZ	OB
Espoir de Hammam Sousse		2–1	1–1	1–0
Étoile de Métlaoui	2–1		1–0	0–0
Espérance de Zarzis	1–1	1–1		1–0
Olympique Béja	0–0	2–0	3–0	

Source: Tunisian Football Federation
Legend: Blue = home team win; Yellow = draw; Red = away team win.
For upcoming matches, an "a" indicates there is an article about the rivalry between the two participants.

==== Clubs season-progress ====
Team ╲ Round	1	2	3	4	5	6
Espoir de Hammam Sousse	L	W	D	W	D	D
Étoile de Métlaoui	W	D	L	L	W	D
Espérance de Zarzis	L	D	D	W	L	D
Olympique Béja	W	L	W	L	D	D

Source: Tunisian Football Federation
W = Win; D = Draw; L = Lose

=== Ranking games ===
The ranking games round were played between the 4th and the 5th from each group from the first round.

==== Seventh place match ====
15 May 2022
15:00

Union de Tataouine	5–3	Avenir de Rejiche
Khemissi 3', 7' (pen.); Khalfa 21' (pen.); Ben Hassine 45'; Rahmani 57'	Report	Sammari 32', 39'; Ben Salem 80'

Stade municipal de Soliman, Soliman
Referee: Achref Harakati

==== Ninth place match ====
15 May 2022
15:00

Club Bizertin	2–1	Avenir de Soliman
Bangoura 40'; Dridi 87'	Report	Bilel 6'

Stade El Menzah, Tunis
Referee: Houssem Boularess

== Season statistics ==
=== Top scorers ===
Rank	Player	Club	Goals
1	(Tunisia) Mohamed Ali Ben Hammouda	ASS then EST	10
2	(Tunisia) Aymen Harzi	CSS	6
2	(Tunisia) Hazem Mastouri	ESM	6
2	(Tunisia) Walid Karoui	CSS	6
5	(Tunisia) Lassaad Jaziri	USBG	5
5	(Tunisia) Yassine Amri	ESS	5
5	(Tunisia) Youssef Ben Souda	ESHS	5
5	(Tunisia) Youssef Abdelli	USM	5
9	(Tunisia) Zied Ben Salem	CSHL	4
9	(Tunisia) Yassine Chamakhi	CA	4
9	(Tunisia) Houssem Louati	UST	4
9	(Guinea) Alkhaly Bangoura	CAB	4
9	(Tunisia) Moumen Rahmani	UST	4
9	(Tunisia) Mohamed Ali Ben Romdhane	EST	4
9	(Tunisia) Zied Aloui	USM	4
9	(Tunisia) Fakhreddine Ouji	USBG	4
17	(Mali) Boling Dembélé	CAB	3
17	(Tunisia) Amine Khaloufi	ESHS	3
17	(Democratic Republic of the Congo) Vinny Bongonga Kombe	ESS	3
17	(Tunisia) Omar Sammari	ASR	3
17	(Tunisia) Oussama Bouguerra	OB	3
17	(Tunisia) Farouk Mimouni	EST	3
17	(Tunisia) Iheb Msakni	ESS	3
17	(Tunisia) Nader Ghandri	CA	3
17	(Algeria) Mohamed Amine Tougai	EST	3
17	(Ivory Coast) Fousseny Coulibaly	EST	3
17	(Libya) Hamdou Elhouni	EST	3
17	(Niger) Youssouf Oumarou	USM	3
17	(Togo) Roger Aholou	USM	3

=== Final ranking ===
Rank	Team
1	Espérance de Tunis
2	Union Monastirienne
3	Club Sfaxien
4	Club Africain
5	Étoile du Sahel
6	Union de Ben Guerdane
7	Union de Tataouine
8	Avenir de Rejiche
9	Club Bizertin
10	Avenir de Soliman
11	Espoir de Hammam Sousse
12	Olympique Béja
13	Étoile de Métlaoui
14	Espérance de Zarzis
15	Croissant Chebbien
16	Club de Hammam-Lif

== Number of teams by Governorate ==
Position	Governorate	Number	Teams
1	Tunis	2	Club Africain, Espérance de Tunis
1	Sousse	2	Espoir de Hammam Sousse, Étoile du Sahel
1	Medenine	2	Espérance de Zarzis, Union de Ben Guerdane
1	Mahdia	2	Avenir de Rejiche, Croissant Chebbien
2	Sfax	1	Club Sfaxien
2	Nabeul	1	Avenir de Soliman
2	Ben Arous	1	Club de Hammam-Lif
2	Bizerte	1	Club Bizertin
2	Monastir	1	Union Monastirienne
2	Gafsa	1	Étoile de Métlaoui
2	Béja	1	Olympique Béja
2	Tataouine	1	Union de Tataouine

== Awards ==
Each month, Internet users voted for the player of the month sponsored by Foot24 and Coca-Cola.

Month	Player of the Month	
Month	Player	Club
October	(Tunisia) Bilel Ifa	Club Africain
March	(Tunisia) Nader Ghandri	Club Africain
April	(Tunisia) Larry Azouni	Club Africain
May	(Tunisia) Ghailene Chaalali	Espérance de Tunis

== Media coverage ==
Tunisian Ligue Professionnelle 1 Media Coverage
Country	Television Channel
Tunisia	Hannibal
Tunisia	Attessia
Tunisia	Home teams YouTube Channels
Qatar	Al-Kass Sports Channel

== See also ==
- 2021–22 Tunisian Cup
