= Hussein Ali Al-Saedi =

Iraqi footballer

Hussein Ali
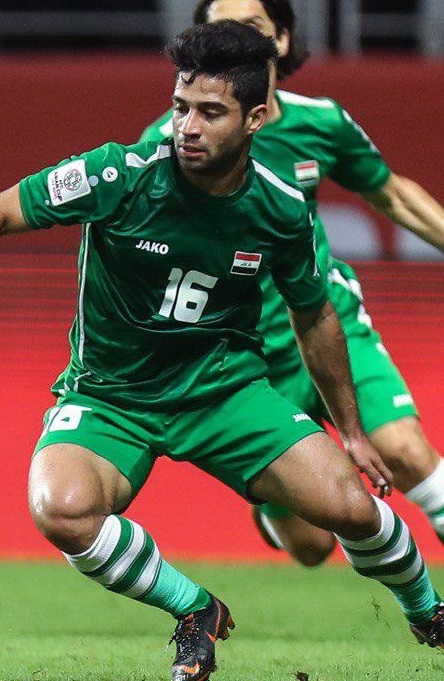
- Ali Al-Saedi with Iraq in 2019

Personal information
- Full name: Hussein Ali Jasim Al-Saedi
- Date of birth: 29 November 1996 (age 29)
- Place of birth: Baghdad, Iraq
- Height: 1.63 m (5 ft 4 in)
- Positions: Midfielder; winger

Team information
- Current team: Al-Shorta
- Number: 9

Youth career
- 2009–2012: Ammo Baba School
- 2012: Al-Quwa Al-Jawiya
- 2013: Baghdad
- 2013–2014: Al-Zawraa

Senior career*
Years	Team	Apps	(Gls)
2014–2018	Al-Zawraa	91	(15)
2018–2019	Qatar SC	21	(3)
2019–2021	Al-Zawraa		(4)
2021–2023	CS Sfaxien	28	(1)
2023–	Al-Shorta	104	(8)

International career^{‡}
2017–2018	Iraq U23	7	(2)
2017–	Iraq	50	(7)
- * Club domestic league appearances and goals as of 2 June 2026 ‡ National team caps and goals as of 17 November 2026

Hussein Ali Jasim Al Saedi (Arabic: حسين علي جاسم الساعدي; born 29 November 1996) is an Iraqi professional footballer who plays for Iraq Stars League club Al-Shorta and the Iraq national team. A creative player, he mainly plays as an attacking midfielder but can also perform well as a winger.

== Club career ==
=== Early career ===
Hussein was born in Baghdad in 1996 and comes from Sadr City. The player started in the youth system of Al-Quwa Al-Jawiya for their Ishbal or cubs team until he enrolled at the Ammo Baba School. There he was trained by the Habib Jafar, a former Iraq player. Like his mentor, Hussein began his career as a right winger but is seen as more than just a right sided attacker. Hussein has a versatility to his game and has already proven that he can play anywhere in midfield, whether it be in the center, out-wide on either wings or as a playmaker. He went onto play for the Iraqi U-14s and for the Iraqi Schoolboys’ team at the 2013 Arab School Championship in Tunisia where he played three matches in the city of Grombalia and scoring one goal in a 3–0 win over Kuwait.

A gifted footballer in his youth, he was often overlooked by youth coaches because of his height. Standing at 1.60 metres (5 ft 3 in), he struggled to make the cut ahead of more physically developed players. This could have stalled the careers of many others, according to football writer Hassanin Mubarak but not Hussein, a player that was destined to make it as a footballer. "If you ask him what he fears most about life, he will tell you, the only thing he fears is failure, which is why he gives every inch on the field and is never one to give up or concede defeat." That overwhelming determination to succeed has seen him win both a league and cup winners’ medal by the time he had turned 20 and he was a regular in Iraq's national side.

=== Al Zawraa ===
Growing up, Hussein Ali was always seen by his coaches as a gifted footballer and the young Hussein traveled the region, playing football for teams in youth tournaments. At just 12 he was part of a 22-man Iraqi Under-14 squad that participated at the Asian Under-14 Games in Doha where he met and took a memorable photo as a memento with Iraqi captain Younis Mahmoud, then a player at Al-Gharafa. Hussein was one of the youngest players in the squad but eight years later, he was the only member of the side to have made it at the top level in the Iraqi league.

After a spell with Nadi Amana Baghdad's U-17 side, Hussein moved to Al-Zawraa which was where he found his spiritual home. He was a student in the fourth grade of middle school when he joined the club's youth side and the coaches at the club knew they had a real talent on their hands. Hussein came under the supervision of Basim Luaibi and played in a youth championship winning team which included defender Najim Shwan and by the time he had turned seventeen, the club's training staff believed it was the right time for him to move up to the first team.

At the start of the season Hussein had been one of the players promoted by the club's new coach Jamal Ali from Al-Zawraa's youth team and had been designated the No.34 as his squad number. However just two matches into the season, the coach, who had brought him into the first team, was sacked after a humiliating 4–2 defeat to lowly Al-Masafi Al-Wasat. His replacement was a former club favourite and player Emad Mohammed.

Whilst there was talk of financial worries behind the scenes in the club boardroom, further exasperation by the team's stuttering league form, Hussein's path to first team football was blocked by players such as Egyptian professional Mostafa Jalal, Mohammed Saad, Haidar Sabah and Amjad Walid and he slid further down the pecking order when Al-Zawraa signed a Brazilian and a Syrian as they looked to challenge for the league title.

In early 2015 and three months after he had turned eighteen, Hussein Ali was on the fringes of making his first team debut for the White Seagulls and on March 6, 2015, he was finally handed his league debut against Naft Al-Wasat at just 18 years, three months and five days. His team were one-nil down to the Najaf-based oil club when his coach Emad Mohammed instructed him to get stripped and warmed-up and moments later he was sent on for another substitute, the same player who had replaced injured Jô Santos after only half-an hour of the match. The Brazilian's injury and the club's decision to subsequently terminate his contract by mutual consent, had opened the door for Hussein Ali.

After the 1–0 defeat to Naft Al-Wasat and the postponement of the Iraqi league, Hussein Ali was given his first league start a month later. It came against Karbala at the Al-Shaab Stadium after the White Seagulls had several key players out with long-term injuries including Brazilian Jô Santos and Syrian Ahmed Al-Douni another professional who had his contract terminated. In their absence Hussein played the full 90 minutes and was one of the best performers in the team and became a regular member of the side going into the remaining matches of the season.

The following season, Al-Zawraa appointed Basim Qasim and once more, Hussein, the youngest member of the team, found himself on the bench for the first game of the season. It took a few matches before the teenager won over the coach with his willingness to fight and run his heart out for the team and became a regular fixture for the first team. He had played in every round on Al-Zawraa's road to the Iraq FA Cup final, where they lost 2–0 to Al-Quwa Al-Jawiya.

He was a substitute for the opening two matches of the season but after a 2–2 draw with Naft Al-Janoob, Hussein was given his first start in a 2–1 victory over Samawa and continued in the first team until Match day 10 when it looked as if his season was over.

On November 19, 2015, Al-Zawraa announced the distressing news that the player had struck by a stray bullet near his home in the east of Baghdad, with the medical staff at a local hospital having been able to remove the bullet from his foot!, The technical staff has given the player a limited rest period.

When he returned, the player was in and out of the team for the remainder of the first stage of the 2015–2016 season. The midfielder had been out for three months as he battled back from the injury and returned on February 11, 2016, as a second-half substitute in a 1–0 victory over Nadi Amana Baghdad and made only two further appearances in the first stage of the Iraqi League.

However, by then, Hussein had gained a starting place in team's – developing a blossoming partnership on the right flank with full back and fellow Al-Thawra resident Alaa Mhawi. In the Elite Stage of the Iraqi league, Hussein started in all of the seven matches and scored two goals as the club won a record 13th Iraqi league title. At the end of the season, Hussein was voted the Iraqi League's young player of the season and next came a call up to the Olympic team. The following season, Hussein was instrumental once again as Al Zawraa won the Iraqi FA Cup.

During the 2018 winter transfer window, the player received an offers, from Qatari club Al Ahli SC, but it was rejected by Al Zawraa board of directors, And from Shabab Al-Ahli Dubai in UAE, and Libyan club to play to their teams. However the deal fell through when his agent was unable to complete the transfer, because of his participation in AFC U23 Championship, and he preferred to stay with his team until the end of the season. On 13 May 2018, the Qatari media reported that Al-Sailiya SC is close to signing with Hussein in the summer transfer, but he moved to another club. Hussein was instrumental in win the league title with Al Zawraa. He scored 7 goals and many assist for the club 2017–18.

=== Qatar SC ===
On 10 June 2018, Qatar SC announced that the player had signed a contract with team for the 2018–2019 season. On 16 July after the end of the long season, he joined Qatar SC, He was given the number 9 jersey. Hussein didn't rest for three consecutive seasons, because of his continuing participation with the club and national teams. He scored his first and second goal for Qatar SC in the first match in the league against Al-Gharafa on 4 August 2018. With a good start, the player experienced difficulties after changing the trainer and adding a striker unable to request the ball behind the defenders and receive the crossing balls. The entire team underperformed as Qatar SC ended the season in the relegation playoff, in which Hussein scored the winner in order to keep the club in the first division. Hussein Ali and Qatar SC ended the contract by mutual consent.

=== Return to Al-Zawraa ===
Hussein Ali returned to Al-Zawraa following his season abroad in Qatar.His second tenure was uneventful as the Iraqi league was suspended once for the 2019 Tishreen Movement which resulted in large scale protests in the country, and then again due to the COVID-19 pandemic.

=== CS Sfaxien ===
21 August 2021, Hussein joined Tunisian side CS Sfaxien. He made 18 appearances for the club in the firs season as his side finished 3rd in the league. Hussein Ali also featured in the 2021–22 CAF Confederation Cup, which his side was knocked out from the group stage. In the Tunisian cup, Hussein Ali scored his first goal for the club in a round of 32 victory against Étoile de Métlaoui in a 3–0 win. Hussein scored a vital 82nd-minute equalizer against Avenir de Rejiche in the Quarter Final to send the game to extra time, in an eventual 4–2 win. On September 10, 2022, Hussein Ali won his first title in Tunisia, as Sfaxien won the 2021–22 Tunisian Cup.

The following season, Hussein Ali scored 5 league goals in 20 appearances as his side finished in a disappointing 6th place in the league. The team also failed to retain their Tunisian cup after being knocked out on penalties in the QF against Olympique Béja in a match where he scored the opener.

On 30 July 2023, Hussein Ali made his final appearance for the club in a 1−0 match defeat against Ittihad Jeddah at the 2023 Arab Club Champions Cup, at which he was sent off during the 41st minute for an early challenge on Tarek Hamed. Following the team's elimination from group stage, he left the team on mutual consent 11 August 2023.

=== Al Shorta ===
On August 23, Hussein Ali returned to Iraq, this time signing for Al-Shorta in a contract reportedly worth US$270,000 a year. The player had a fall-out with the manager following the team's match vs Zakho, but the matter was resolved and he returned to training. Hussein was an important figure in the team as the club retained the Iraqi premier League title, and won the FA Cup title.

== International career ==
=== Iraq U-23 ===
Hussein first tournament for the Iraq national U-23 team was the 2018 AFC U-23 Championship qualification. He started in all of the three matches that Iraq played, scoring a goal against Saudi Arabia, in a match that ended in a 2–0 win for Iraq. He was the best player in the group matches. In January the AFC nominated five players to watch and the best young talent from across the continent before 2018 AFC U-23 Championship, he scoring amazing goal for Iraq against Malaysia.

=== Iraq ===
On 26 August 2017, Hussein made his International debut against Syria national team in a friendly match ended draw 1–1. He had a breakthrough in the 23rd Arabian Gulf Cup, where he impressed greatly, being named man of the match in all three group stage games. He scored his first goal for Iraq national team in a 2–3 loss over Qatar during 2018 International Friendship Championship.

== Career statistics ==
=== Club ===
As of 19 February 2023.

Appearances and goals by club, season and competition
Club	Season	League			Cup		Continental²		Other^{1}		Total	
Club	Season	Division	Apps	Goals	Apps	Goals	Apps	Goals	Apps	Goals	Apps	Goals
Qatar SC	2018–19	QSL	21	3	2	0	0	0	1	1	24	4
CS Sfaxien	2021-22	Tunisian Ligue Professionnelle 1	18	0	1	2	5	0	0	0	24	1
CS Sfaxien	2022-23	Tunisian Ligue Professionnelle 1	20	5	2	1	4	0	0	0	26	6
Career total			59	8	5	3	9	0	1	1	74	11

^{1} Include League play-off match.

^{²} CAF Confederation Cup

=== International ===
As of 17 November 2026

Iraq national team
Year	Apps	Goals
2017	8	0
2018	9	1
2019	12	3
2021	7	0
2022	5	1
2023	5	1
2025	2	0
2026	2	1
Total	50	7

Scores and results list Iraq's goal tally first.

#	Date	Venue	Opponent	Score	Result	Competition
1.	21 March 2018	Basra International Stadium, Basra, Iraq	Qatar	2–3	2–3	2018 International Friendship Championship
2.	30 July 2019	Karbala International Stadium, Karbala, Iraq	Lebanon	1–0	1–0	2019 WAFF Championship
3.	2 August 2019	Karbala International Stadium, Karbala, Iraq	Palestine	2–1	2–1	2019 WAFF Championship
4.	11 August 2019	Karbala International Stadium, Karbala, Iraq	Yemen	2–0	2–1	2019 WAFF Championship
5.	24 March 2022	King Fahd Sports City Stadium, Riyadh, Saudi Arabia	United Arab Emirates	1–0	1–0	2022 FIFA World Cup qualification
6.	12 January 2023	Basra International Stadium, Basra, Iraq	Yemen	5–0	5–0	25th Arabian Gulf Cup
7.	17 November 2026	Basra International Stadium, Basra, Iraq	Iran	1–0	1–1	2026 Basra International Tournament

== Style of play ==
Hussein gives everything on the pitch. He is the type who would dribble past every player on the opposing team and either finish promptly past the keeper or pass it to a team-mate for an easy tap-in. A complete street footballer, or shaabiya footballer as you would say in Iraq, he is equally capable of winning the ball back for his team with a lunging tackle and score a last-gasp winner from the edge of the box."

— Hassanin Mubarak, football writer commenting on Hussein.

Hussein Ali is known for his agility, close ball control, and low center of gravity, which allow him to navigate tight spaces and evade defenders effectively. He is capable of playing across multiple midfield roles, including as a winger or attacking midfielder. Observers have noted his work rate and versatility, with football writer Hassanin Mubarak highlighting his technical skills and determination. Former Iraq international Ahmed Radhi, praised Ali's ability to create attacking opportunities, likening his influence on the field to that of high-profile players.

== Honours ==
Al-Zawraa

- Iraqi Premier League: 2015–16, 2017–18
- Iraq FA Cup: 2016–17
- Iraqi Super Cup: 2017

CS Sfaxien

- Tunisian Cup: 2021–22

Al-Shorta

- Iraq Stars League: 2023–24, 2024–25
- Iraq FA Cup: 2023–24

lraq

- WAFF Championship runner-up: 2019
- Arabian Gulf Cup: 2023

Individual

- 2019 WAFF Championship: Top Scorer
- 2019 WAFF Championship: Best Player
