= Mohamed Konaté =

Mohamed Konaté may refer to:

- Mohamed Konaté (footballer, born 1992), Malian footballer
- Mohamed Konaté (footballer, born 1997), Ivorian-Burkinabé footballer
