= Ali Kalaiî =

Tunisian footballer

Personal information
- Date of birth: 22 March 1986 (age 40)
- Height: 1.80 m (5 ft 11 in)
- Position: Goalkeeper

Senior career*
Years	Team	Apps	(Gls)
2006–2009	CS Sfaxien		
2009–2011	EGS Gafsa		
2011–2018	JS Kairouan		
2018–2019	Stade Gabèsien		
2019–2022	CS Chebba		
2022–2023	US Ben Guerdane		
2023	US Tataouine		
- * Club domestic league appearances and goals

Ali Kalaiî (born 22 March 1986) is a Tunisian football goalkeeper.
