= Mohamed Dhaoui =

Tunisian footballer (born 2003)

Personal information
- Full name: Mohamed Dhaoui
- Date of birth: 14 May 2003 (age 23)
- Place of birth: El Hamma, Tunisia
- Height: 1.75 m (5 ft 9 in)
- Position: Winger

Youth career
- Sportive El Hamma
- Étoile du Sahel

Senior career*
Years	Team	Apps	(Gls)
2021–2023	Étoile du Sahel	23	(6)
2023–2026	Al Ahly	11	(0)
2024–2025	→ CS Sfaxien (loan)	29	(3)
2025–2026	→ Étoile du Sahel (loan)	26	(1)

International career^{‡}
2022–2023	Tunisia U20	10	(1)
2023–	Tunisia	2	(0)
- * Club domestic league appearances and goals as of 16 August 2026 ‡ National team caps and goals as of 20 June 2023

Mohamed Dhaoui (Arabic: محمد الضاوي; born 14 May 2003), commonly known as Cristo, is a Tunisian professional footballer who currently plays as a winger for the Tunisia national team.

== Career ==
Dhaoui started his career with Étoile du Sahel. In 2023, he signed for Al Ahly.

== Career statistics ==
=== Club ===
As of 28 January 2023.

Appearances and goals by club, season and competition
Club	Season	League			Cup		Continental		Other		Total	
Club	Season	Division	Apps	Goals	Apps	Goals	Apps	Goals	Apps	Goals	Apps	Goals
Étoile du Sahel	2021–22	Tunisian Ligue Professionnelle 1	17	2	1	0	6 (Note: Appearances in CAF Champions League)	1	—		24	3
Étoile du Sahel	2022–23	Tunisian Ligue Professionnelle 1	6	4	0	0	—		—		6	4
Étoile du Sahel	Total		23	6	1	0	6	1	—		30	7
Al Ahly	2022–23	Egyptian Premier League	9	0	2	0	0	0	0	0	11	0
Al Ahly	2023–24	Egyptian Premier League	1	0	0	0	2	0	0	0	3	0
Al Ahly	Total		10	0	2	0	2	0	0	0	14	0
Career Total			33	6	3	0	8	1	0	0	44	7

=== International ===
As of 20 June 2023

Team	Year	Apps	Goals
Tunisia U20	2022	1	0
Tunisia U20	2023	9	1
Tunisia U20	Total	10	1
Tunisia	2023	2	0
Total		12	1

== Honours ==
Al Ahly

- Egyptian Premier League: 2022–23
- Egypt Cup: 2021–22, 2022–23
- CAF Champions League: 2022–23, 2023–24
- Egyptian Super Cup: 2022–23, 2023–24
