= Stanley Ampaw =

Ghanaian footballer

Personal information
- Full name: Stanley Aniagyei Ampaw
- Date of birth: 26 December 2002 (age 23)
- Place of birth: Ghana
- Position: Midfielder

Team information
- Current team: Étoile du Sahel (on loan from Liberty Professionals)
- Number: 32

Senior career*
Years	Team	Apps	(Gls)
2019–	Liberty Professionals	21	(1)
2022–	→ Étoile du Sahel (loan)	1	(1)
- * Club domestic league appearances and goals as of 2 March 2022

Stanley Aniagyei Ampaw (born 26 December 2002) is a Ghanaian professional footballer who plays as a central midfielder for Étoile Sportive du Sahel.

== Career ==
Ampaw started his playing career with Accra Hearts of Oak playing in the club's under-17 side, Royal Oaks till he was promoted to the under-20 side, Auroras in August 2018. In 2020, he moved to fellow Accra-based team Liberty Professionals. During the 2020–21 season, he played 21 league matches and was one of the standout players within the season.

In January 2022, he joined Tunisian club Étoile Sportive du Sahel on a one-year loan deal.

On 2 March 2022, he made his debut coming on for Iheb Msakni as a 78th-minute substitute against Soliman, scoring the second goal in a 2–0 home victory in the Tunisian Ligue Professionnelle.
