= El Krib =

Coordinates: 36°18′00″N 9°07′48″E

El Krib الكريب
- Commune and town
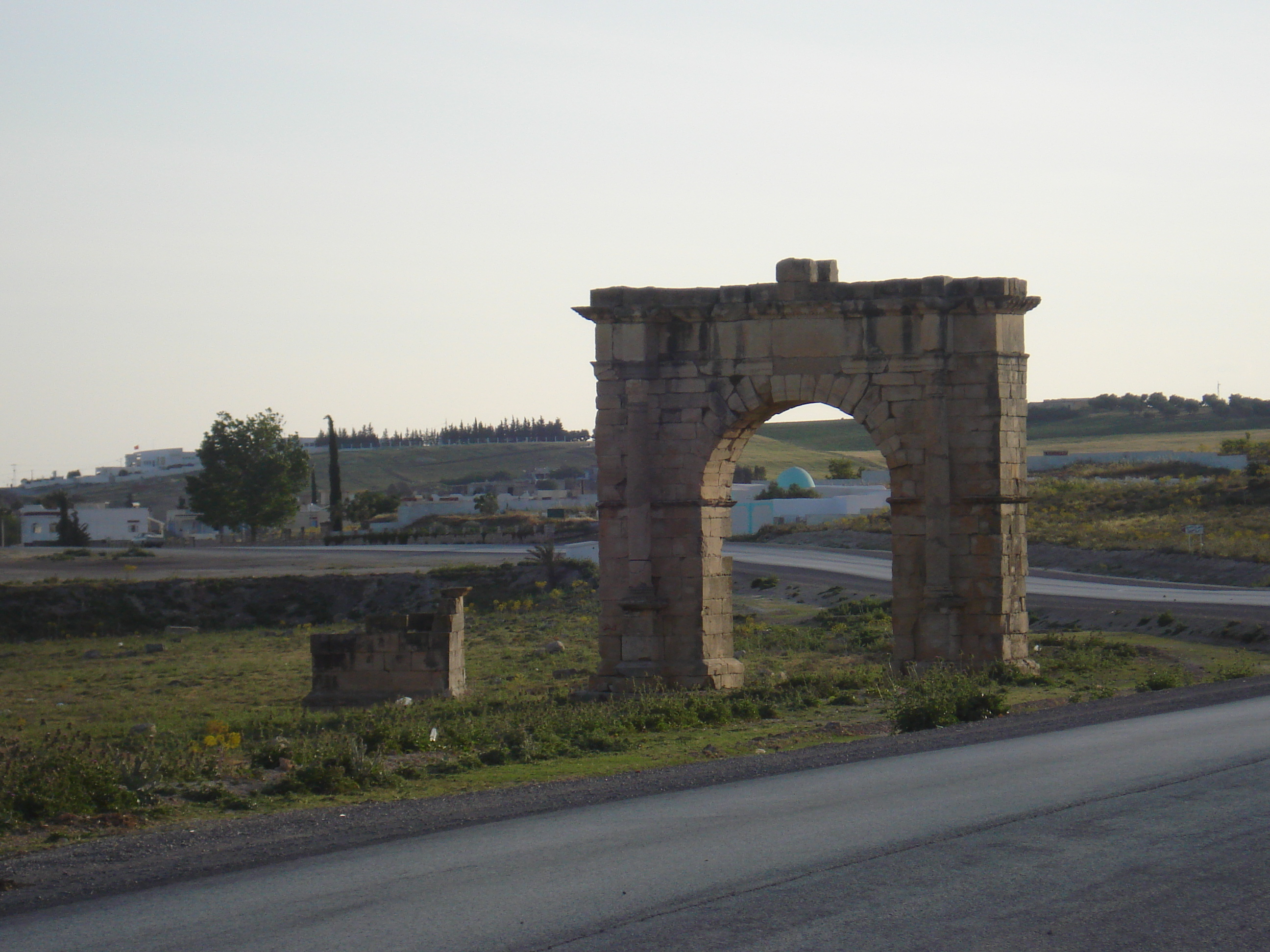
- Interactive map of El Krib
- Country: Tunisia
- Governorate: Siliana Governorate

Population (2014)
  - Total: 7,850
- Time zone: UTC+1 (CET)

El Krib is a town and commune in the Siliana Governorate, Tunisia. As of 2004 it had a population of 2,811.

== See also ==
- List of cities in Tunisia
