= Magel Bel Abbès =

Coordinates: 34°45′00″N 8°31′20″E

Magel Bel Abbès ماجل بلعباس
- Commune and town
- Interactive map of Magel Bel Abbès
- Country: Tunisia
- Governorate: Kasserine Governorate

Population (2014)
  - Total: 6,480
- Time zone: UTC+1 (CET)

Magel Bel Abbès is a town and commune in the Kasserine Governorate, Tunisia. As of 2004 it had a population of 5003.

== See also ==
- List of cities in Tunisia
