= Malek Baayou =

Tunisian footballer

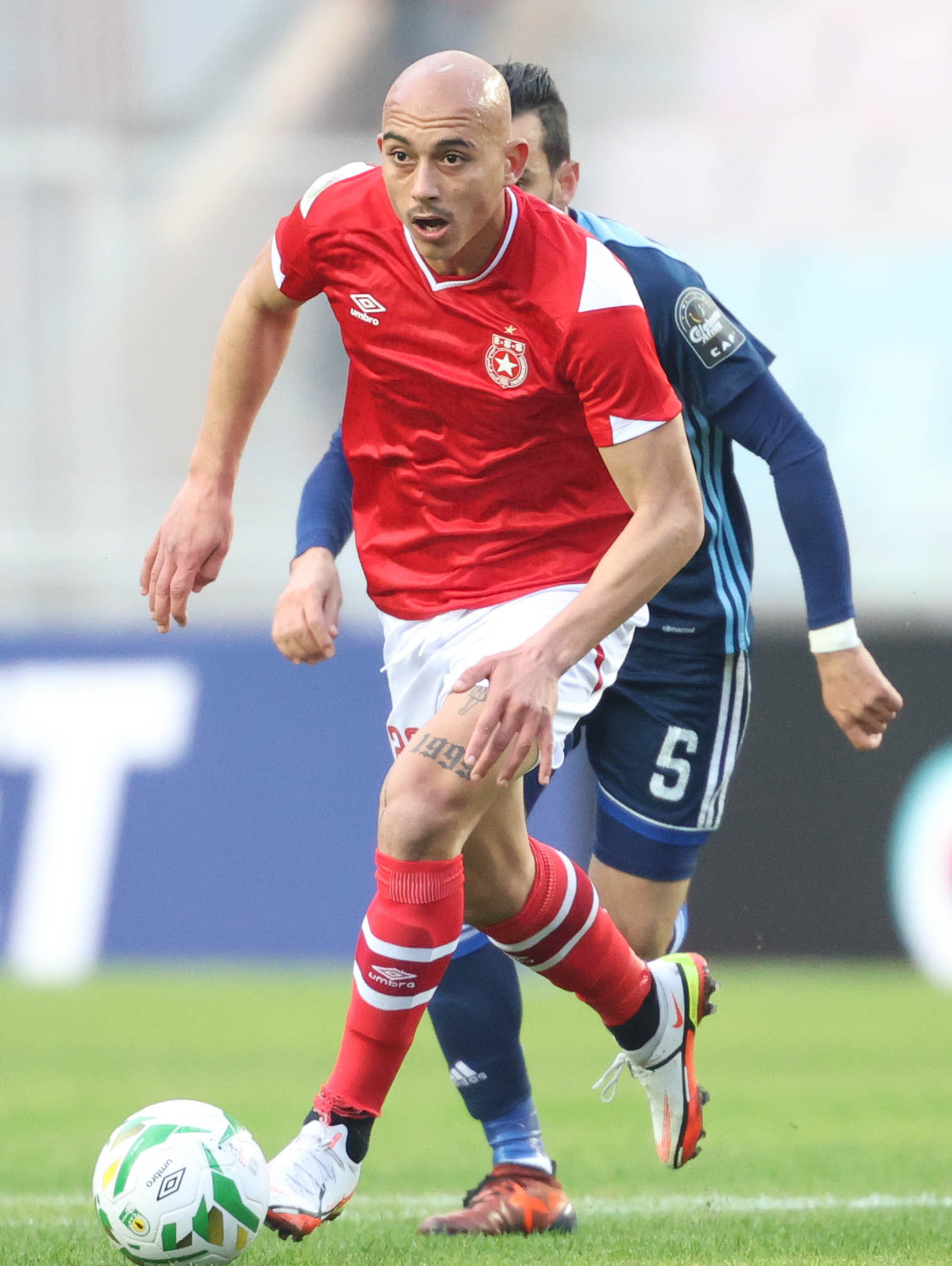
- Baayou in 2022

Personal information
- Date of birth: 29 April 1999 (age 27)
- Place of birth: Sousse, Tunisia
- Height: 1.77 m (5 ft 10 in)
- Position: Midfielder

Team information
- Current team: ES Sahel
- Number: 20

Youth career
- ES Sahel

Senior career*
Years	Team	Apps	(Gls)
2017–2023	ES Sahel	81	(1)
2023	Smouha SC	12	(1)
2023–2024	Swift Hesperange	2	(0)
2024–	ES Sahel		

International career^{‡}
2019–	Tunisia	2	(0)
- * Club domestic league appearances and goals as of 27 February 2022 ‡ National team caps and goals as of 04:00, 27 February 2022 (UTC+2)

Malek Baayou (born 29 April 1999; Arabic: مالك بعيو), also spelled Malek Beaoui, is a Tunisian professional footballer who plays as a midfielder for Étoile Sportive du Sahel and the Tunisia national team.

== Club career ==
Baayou was born in Sousse, Tunisia. He was trained at the Étoile Sportive du Sahel (ESS), where he goes through all categories of young people.

In 2019, he renewed his contract with ES Sahel, signing a four-year contract.

In January 2019, he was voted best player of the month in Tunisian League.

He participates with the same club in the CAF Champions League, the CAF Confederation Cup and the CAF Supercup.

== International career ==
Baayou played his first match for the Tunisia national team on 21 September 2019, in a friendly against Libya. This match won 1–0 is part of the qualifiers for the 2020 African Nations Championship.

== Honours ==
ES Sahel

- Tunisian Cup: 2018-19
- Arab Club Champions Cup: 2018-19
