= Vinny Bongonga =

Congolese footballer (born 1996)

Personal information
- Full name: Vinny Bongonga Kombe
- Date of birth: 24 March 1996 (age 30)
- Place of birth: Kinshasa, Zaïre
- Height: 1.80 m (5 ft 11 in)
- Position: Forward

Team information
- Current team: Étoile du Sahel
- Number: 9

Youth career
- JAC Trésor
- JAC Héritage

Senior career*
Years	Team	Apps	(Gls)
- JS Kinshasa
- AC Rangers
- FC Arc-en-Ciel
2015–2016	AC Léopard		
2016–2019	DC Motema Pembe		
2019	Liaoning Kaixin	0	(0)
2019–2020	DC Motema Pembe		
2020–2021	Al-Hilal Omdurman		
2021–	Étoile du Sahel	37	(7)

International career^{‡}
2017	DR Congo	2	(0)
- * Club domestic league appearances and goals as of 21 August 2023 ‡ National team caps and goals as of 21 August 2023

Vinny Bongonga Kombe (born 24 March 1996) is a Congolese football striker who plays for Étoile du Sahel.

== Playing career ==
Following 32 league goals for second-tier club FC Arc-en-Ciel, he moved abroad to AC Léopard in the Republic of the Congo. After winning the league championship there, he moved back to DC Motema Pembe. During his time there, he made his international debut for DR Congo.

A stint with Chinese Liaoning Kaixin in 2019 was halted due to "administrative problems". He immediately returned to DC Motema Pembe. Following 11 goals in the 2019–20 Linafoot, his contract expired, and he was reluctant to sign a new one. Amid rumours of a transfer to Morocco or Belgium, Bongonga moved abroad again, this time to Sudanese club Al-Hilal Omdurman, where he again became league champion. This earned him a move to Tunisia in 2021. Étoile du Sahel signed him on a three-year contract.

By 2023, he was no longer a starter, but played from time to time as the team improved from a weak performance in 2021–22 to win the 2022–23 Tunisian Ligue Professionnelle 1. Among others, Bongonga scored a winning goal against CSS Sfaxien.
