= Wajdi Mejri =

Tunisian footballer

Personal information
- Date of birth: 28 May 1989 (age 37)
- Position: Forward

Senior career*
Years	Team	Apps	(Gls)
2012–2013	CS Sfaxien		
2013–2015	JS Kairouan		
2015	Étoile du Sahel		
2015–2016	EGS Gafsa		
2016	Stade Gabèsien		
2016–2017	ES Zarzis		
2018	CO Médenine		
2018–2019	Jendouba Sport		
2020–2021	CS M'saken		
2021–2022	Almahalla		
2022–2023	Al-Sharq		
- * Club domestic league appearances and goals

Wajdi Mejri (born 28 May 1989) is a Tunisian footballer who plays as a forward.
