= Wassim Rezgui =

Tunisian footballer

Wassim Rezgui (Arabic: وسيم رزقي) (born April 24, 1986), is a Tunisian football player currently playing for Hilal of Benghazi in the Libyan Premier League.

== Clubs ==
- 2007-08: (Tunisia) Club Africain
- 2008-09: (Tunisia) AS Marsa
- 2009-10: (Libya) Al-Hilal
- 2010-11: (Libya) Aschat
- 2013-14: (Tunisia) SC Ben Arous
- 2015 : (Germany) SV Schüren
- 2015-17: (Germany) Holzwickeder SC
- 2017-18: (Germany) SV Schüren
- 2020- : (Tunisia) Grombalia
