= Takelsa =

Coordinates: 36°47′N 10°38′E

- Commune and town
- Interactive map of Takelsa
- Country: Tunisia
- Governorate: Nabeul Governorate

Population (2022)
  - Total: 24,109
- Time zone: UTC+1 (CET)

Takelsa is a town and commune in the Nabeul Governorate, which is situated in north-eastern Tunisia. As of 2004, it had a population of 20,169.

== See also ==
- List of cities in Tunisia
