= Chaouki Ben Khader =

Tunisian footballer

Personal information
- Date of birth: 2 February 2001 (age 25)
- Place of birth: Ben Guerdane, Tunisia
- Height: 1.92 m (6 ft 4 in)
- Position: Defender

Team information
- Current team: CS Sfaxien
- Number: 22

Youth career
- US Ben Guerdane

Senior career*
| Years | Team | Apps | (Gls) |
| 2018−2023 | US Ben Guerdane | 68 | (3) |
| 2024– | CS Sfaxien | | |

International career
| 2021 | Tunisia U20 | | |
- * Club domestic league appearances and goals

Chaouki Ben Khader (born 2 February 2001) is a Tunisian professional football player who plays for CS Sfaxien.

== Club career ==
Chaouki Ben Khader made his professional debut for US Ben Guerdane on the 26 May 2019, starting as center forward in the Ligue Pro 1 against CS Hammam-Lif.

== International career ==
With Tunisia U20, Ben Khader reached the U20 CAN semifinals in 2021.
