= Mohamed Konaté (footballer, born 1992) =

Malian footballer

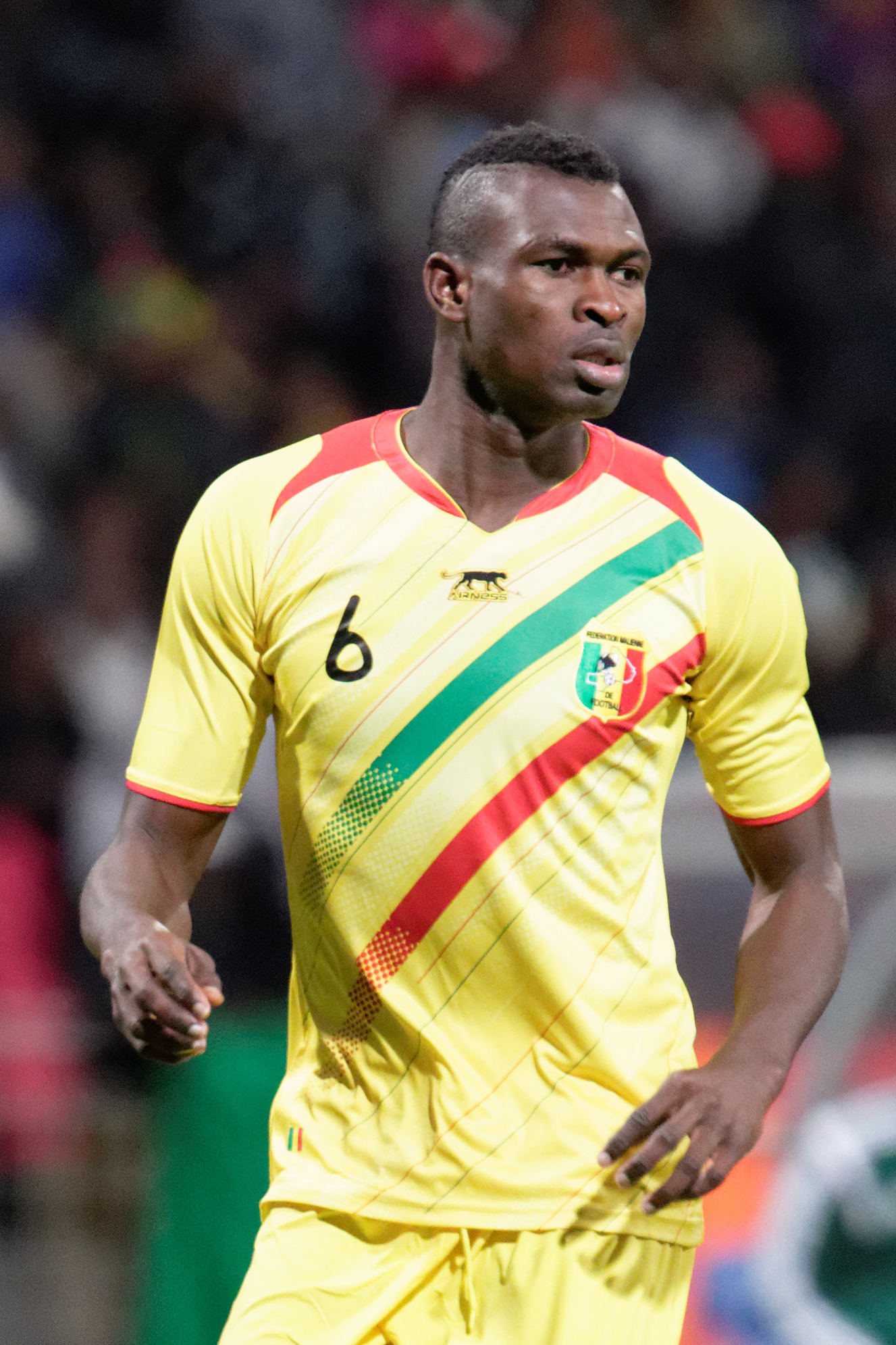
- Konaté with Mali in 2015

Personal information
- Full name: Mohamed Oumar Konaté
- Date of birth: 20 October 1992 (age 34)
- Place of birth: Bamako, Mali
- Height: 1.92 m (6 ft 4 in)
- Position: Centre-back

Team information
- Current team: CS Chebba

Youth career
- Djoliba

Senior career*
Years	Team	Apps	(Gls)
2011–2013	Djoliba		
2013–2017	Nahdat Berkane	110	(9)
2017–2021	Étoile du Sahel	41	(1)
2021–2023	CS Chebba	19	(0)

International career^{‡}
2014–	Mali	9	(0)
- * Club domestic league appearances and goals as of 1 July 2023 ‡ National team caps and goals as of 09:19, 17 June 2019 (UTC)

Mohamed Oumar Konaté (born 20 October 1992) is a Malian professional footballer who plays as a centre-back. He previously played for Djoliba de Bamako in Mali, for Moroccan side Nahdat Berkane and for Tunisian clubs Étoile du Sahel and CS Chebba.

== International career ==
On 29 June 2014, Konaté made his debut for the Mali national team in a 3–1 win against China in an international friendly.

He was also played at the Under-20 level for Mali.
