= Sakiet Eddaïer =

Coordinates: 34°48′00″N 10°46′48″E

Sakiet Eddaïer ساقية الدائر
- Commune and town
- Interactive map of Sakiet Eddaïer
- Country: Tunisia
- Governorate: Sfax Governorate

Population (2022)
  - Total: 125,204
- Time zone: UTC+1 (CET)

Sakiet Eddaïer (Arabic: ساقية الدائر) is a town and commune in the Sfax Governorate, Tunisia. As of 2004 it had a population of 40,717.

It is located at the entrance of National Road 1 (RN1) as it enters the Sfax metropolitan area.

== Population ==
2014 Census (Municipal)
Homes	Families	Males	Females	Total
33104	28737	54382	52885	107267

== See also ==
- List of cities in Tunisia
