= Walid Karoui =

Tunisian footballer (born 1996)

Personal information
- Date of birth: 25 March 1996 (age 30)
- Place of birth: Sfax, Tunisia
- Height: 1.78 m (5 ft 10 in)
- Position: Midfielder

Team information
- Current team: ES Sahel
- Number: 7

Youth career
- CS Sfaxien

Senior career*
Years	Team	Apps	(Gls)
2014–2022	CS Sfaxien	79	(12)
2022–2023	Al Dhafra	21	(1)
2023–2024	Al-Muharraq SC		(2)
2024–	ES Sahel	20	(2)

International career
2018	Tunisia	1	(0)
- * Club domestic league appearances and goals as of 25 July 2025 @ 09:36(AEST)

Walid Karoui (born 25 March 1996) is a Tunisian professional footballer who plays as a midfielder for ES Sahel.
