= CS Chebba =

Tunisian football club

Croissant Chebbien
- Full name: Croissant Sportif Chebbien
- Short name: CSCH
- Founded: 1960; 65 years ago
- Ground: Municipal Stadium of Chebba
- Capacity: 3,000
- Chairman: (Tunisia) Taoufik Mkacher
- League: Professional League 2
Home colours	Away colours	Third colours

Croissant Sportif Chebbien is a Tunisian football team, competing in the 2019–20 Tunisian Ligue Professionnelle 1, from Chebba in Tunisia.

== History ==
It was founded in 1960 in Chebba in the Sahel region of Tunisia. In 1999 the club made his debut in the Tunisian Cup, managing to advance to the round of 32, being eliminated by AS Gabès.

In 2015 it made his debut in the Tunisian Ligue Professionnelle 3 where it was 4th in the southern group until 2017.

In the same year it made his debut in Tunisian Ligue Professionnelle 2 until 2019, winning group B, achieving promotion to Tunisian Ligue Professionnelle 1 for the 2019–20 season for the first time in its history.

In his first season it finished in 8th place as the best position in his history. In the same season, it managed to reach the semifinals of the Tunisian cup by facing Espérance de Tunis, being eliminated by a score of 2–0.

In de 2021–22 season the club relegated but the club appealed the decision at the Court of Arbitration for Sport, The Court decided the reinstatement of Club Croissant Sportif Chebbien in Ligue 1 of the championship for the 2022–2023 season.

== Players ==
As of 23 November 2021

No	Position	Player	Nation
1	GK	Abdessalem Hallaoui	Tunisia
2	MF	Nader Gara	Tunisia
3	DF	Mohamed Amine Nefzi	Tunisia
4	DF	Vivien Assie	Ivory Coast
5	MF	Thierry Tchuente	Cameroon
6	MF	Chedly Haj Mohamed	Tunisia
8	MF	Fahmi Maâouani	Tunisia
9	MF	Mohamed Réda Nekrouf	Algeria
10	FW	Jilani Abdessalam	Tunisia
11	FW	Fedi Felhi	Tunisia
13	DF	Achref Zouaghi	Tunisia
14	DF	Mohamed Konate	Mali
15	FW	Mohamed Amine Hamia	Algeria
17	FW	Oussema Ben Maamer	Tunisia
19	FW	Sadok Ben Salem	Tunisia
20	FW	Mohamed Aloui	Tunisia
22	GK	Ali Kalaiî	Tunisia
25	DF	Walid Sahli	Tunisia
26	DF	Foued Timoumi	Tunisia
27	FW	Saadeddine Hamdi	Tunisia
28	FW	Wilfried Bisso'o	Cameroon
29	MF	Adem Khamassi	Tunisia
30	DF	Chakib Derouiche	Tunisia

== Managers ==
- (Tunisia) Mohamed Mkacher (2015–2018)
- (Tunisia) Ezzedine Khemila (2018)
- (Tunisia) Chokri Béjaoui (2018)
- (Tunisia) Maher Guizani (2018–2019)
- (France) Victor Zvunka (2019)
- (France) Bertrand Marchand (2019–2022)
- (Tunisia) Kais Yâakoubi (2022)
- (Morocco) Ezzaki Badou (2022–2023)
- (Tunisia) Skander Kasri (2023–present)

== Presidents ==
- (Tunisia) Ali Ayed (2013–2015)
- (Tunisia) Taoufik Mkacher (2015–present)
