= Louay Ben Hassine =

Tunisian professional footballer

Personal information
- Date of birth: 2 April 2000 (age 26)
- Place of birth: Sousse, Tunisia
- Height: 1.76 m (5 ft 9 in)
- Position: Midfielder

Team information
- Current team: Gol Gohar
- Number: 99

Youth career
- –2020: ES Sahel

Senior career*
Years	Team	Apps	(Gls)
2020–2024	ES Sahel	46	(2)
2020–2021	→ US Ben Guerdane (loan)	21	(2)
2022	→ US Tataouine (loan)	8	(1)
2024–2026	Radnički 1923	70	(7)
2026–	Gol Gohar	8	(1)
- * Club domestic league appearances and goals as of 5 June 2026 ‡ National team caps and goals as of 13 November 2024

Louay Ben Hassine (born 2 April 2000) is a Tunisian professional footballer who plays as a Midfielder for Persian Gulf Pro League club Gol Gohar Sirjan.

== Honours ==
ES Sahel

- Tunisian Ligue Professionnelle 1: 2022–23

Radnički 1923

- Serbian SuperLiga Player of the Week: 2024–25 (Round 6)
