= 2015 CAF Confederation Cup final =

- Event: 2015 CAF Confederation Cup
Orlando Pirates	Étoile du Sahel
(South Africa)	(Tunisia)
1	2

First leg
Orlando Pirates	Étoile du Sahel
1	1
- Date: 21 November 2015
- Venue: Orlando Stadium, Johannesburg
- Referee: Janny Sikazwe (Zambia)

Second leg
Étoile du Sahel	Orlando Pirates
1	0
- Date: 29 November 2015
- Venue: Stade Olympique de Sousse, Sousse
- Referee: Néant Alioum (Cameroon)

The 2015 CAF Confederation Cup final was the final of the 2015 CAF Confederation Cup, the 12th edition of the CAF Confederation Cup, Africa's secondary club football competition organized by the Confederation of African Football (CAF).

The final was contested in two-legged home-and-away format between Orlando Pirates of South Africa and Étoile du Sahel of Tunisia. The first leg was hosted by Orlando Pirates at the Orlando Stadium in Johannesburg on 21 November 2015, while the second leg was hosted by Étoile du Sahel at the Stade Olympique de Sousse in Sousse on 29 November 2015. The winner earned the right to play in the 2016 CAF Super Cup against the winner of the 2015 CAF Champions League.

After drawing the first leg 1–1, Étoile du Sahel won the second leg 1–0 on Ammar Jemal's goal, giving them the title on the 2–1 on aggregate.

== Road to final ==
Note: In all results below, the score of the finalist is given first (H: home; A: away).

(South Africa) Orlando Pirates				Round	(Tunisia) Étoile du Sahel			
Opponent	Agg.	1st leg	2nd leg	Qualifying rounds	Opponent	Agg.	1st leg	2nd leg
Bye				Preliminary round	Bye			
(Uganda) URA	4–3	2–1 (H)	2–2 (A)	First round	(Angola) Benfica de Luanda	2–1	1–0 (H)	1–1 (A)
(Gabon) CF Mounana	5–2	2–2 (A)	3–0 (H)	Second round	(Tanzania) Young Africans	2–1	1–1 (A)	1–0 (H)
(Guinea) AS Kaloum	6–1	2–0 (A)	4–1 (H)	Play-off round	(Morocco) Raja Casablanca	3–2	0–2 (A)	3–0 (H)
Opponent	Result			Group stage	Opponent	Result		
(Republic of the Congo) AC Léopards	1–0 (A)			Matchday 1	(Mali) Stade Malien	1–0 (H)		
(Egypt) Zamalek	1–2 (H)			Matchday 2	(Tunisia) Espérance de Tunis	1–0 (A)		
(Tunisia) CS Sfaxien	1–0 (A)			Matchday 3	(Egypt) Al-Ahly	0–1 (A)		
(Tunisia) CS Sfaxien	2–0 (H)			Matchday 4	(Egypt) Al-Ahly	1–0 (H)		
(Republic of the Congo) AC Léopards	2–0 (H)			Matchday 5	(Mali) Stade Malien	1–1 (A)		
(Egypt) Zamalek	1–4 (A)			Matchday 6	(Tunisia) Espérance de Tunis	2–1 (H)		
Group B runner-up: Pos / Team / Pld / W / D / L / GF / GA / GD / Pts / Qualification; 1 / (Egypt) Zamalek / 6 / 5 / 0 / 1 / 12 / 4 / +8 / 15 / Advance to knockout stage; 2 / (South Africa) Orlando Pirates / 6 / 4 / 0 / 2 / 8 / 6 / +2 / 12 / Advance to knockout stage; 3 / (Republic of the Congo) AC Léopards / 6 / 1 / 2 / 3 / 2 / 6 / −4 / 5; 4 / (Tunisia) CS Sfaxien / 6 / 0 / 2 / 4 / 2 / 8 / −6 / 2; Source: CAF				Final standings	Group A runner-up: Pos / Team / Pld / W / D / L / GF / GA / GD / Pts / Qualification; 1 / (Egypt) Al-Ahly / 6 / 4 / 1 / 1 / 6 / 1 / +5 / 13 / Advance to knockout stage; 2 / (Tunisia) Étoile du Sahel / 6 / 4 / 1 / 1 / 6 / 3 / +3 / 13 / Advance to knockout stage; 3 / (Mali) Stade Malien / 6 / 1 / 2 / 3 / 3 / 5 / −2 / 5; 4 / (Tunisia) Espérance de Tunis / 6 / 1 / 0 / 5 / 3 / 9 / −6 / 3; Source: CAF			
Opponent	Agg.	1st leg	2nd leg	Knockout stage	Opponent	Agg.	1st leg	2nd leg
(Egypt) Al-Ahly	5–3	1–0 (H)	4–3 (A)	Semifinals	(Egypt) Zamalek	5–4	5–1 (H)	0–3 (A)

== Rules ==
The final was played on a home-and-away two-legged basis, with the order of legs decided by a draw, held after the group stage draw. If the aggregate score was tied after the second leg, the away goals rule would be applied, and if still level, the penalty shoot-out would be used to determine the winner (no extra time would be played).

== Matches ==
=== First leg ===
21 November 2015
20:00 UTC+2

Orlando Pirates (South Africa)	1–1	(Tunisia) Étoile du Sahel
Gabuza 36'	Report	Jemal 87'

Orlando Stadium, Johannesburg
Referee: Janny Sikazwe (Zambia)

Orlando Pirates	Étoile du Sahel

GK	(Equatorial Guinea) Felipe Ovono
DF	(South Africa) Siyabonga Sangweni
DF	(South Africa) Happy Jele
DF	(South Africa) Ayanda Gcaba
DF	(South Africa) Thabo Matlaba
MF	(South Africa) Lehlogonolo Masalesa	(substituted off) 83'
MF	(South Africa) Thandani Ntshumayelo
MF	(South Africa) Mpho Makola
MF	(South Africa) Thabo Rakhale
FW	(South Africa) Thamsanqa Gabuza
FW	(South Africa) Kermit Erasmus	(substituted off) 88'
Substitutes:
GK	(South Africa) Brighton Mhlongo
DF	(South Africa) Ntsikelelo Nyauza
MF	(Senegal) Issa Sarr	(substituted in) 83'
MF	(South Africa) Gift Motupa	(substituted in) 88'
MF	(South Africa) Sifiso Myeni
MF	(South Africa) Menzi Masuku
FW	(South Africa) Lehlohonolo Majoro
Manager:
(South Africa) Eric Tinkler

GK	(Tunisia) Zied Jebali
DF	(Tunisia) Ghazi Abderrazzak
DF	(Tunisia) Ammar Jemal
DF	(Tunisia) Zied Boughattas
DF	(Tunisia) Hamdi Nagguez
DF	(Tunisia) Alaya Brigui	(substituted off) 87'
MF	(Tunisia) Mohamed Ben Amor
MF	(Cameroon) Franck Kom
MF	(Tunisia) Iheb Msakni	(substituted off) 85'
MF	(Tunisia) Hamza Lahmar
FW	(Algeria) Baghdad Bounedjah
Substitutes:
GK	(Tunisia) Aymen Mathlouthi
DF	(Tunisia) Saddam Ben Aziza
MF	(Tunisia) Mehdi Saada	(substituted in) 87'
MF	(Nigeria) Moses Orkuma
FW	(Brazil) Diogo	(substituted in) 85'
DF	(Tunisia) Rami Bedoui
MF	(Tunisia) Aymen Trabelsi
Manager:
(Tunisia) Faouzi Benzarti

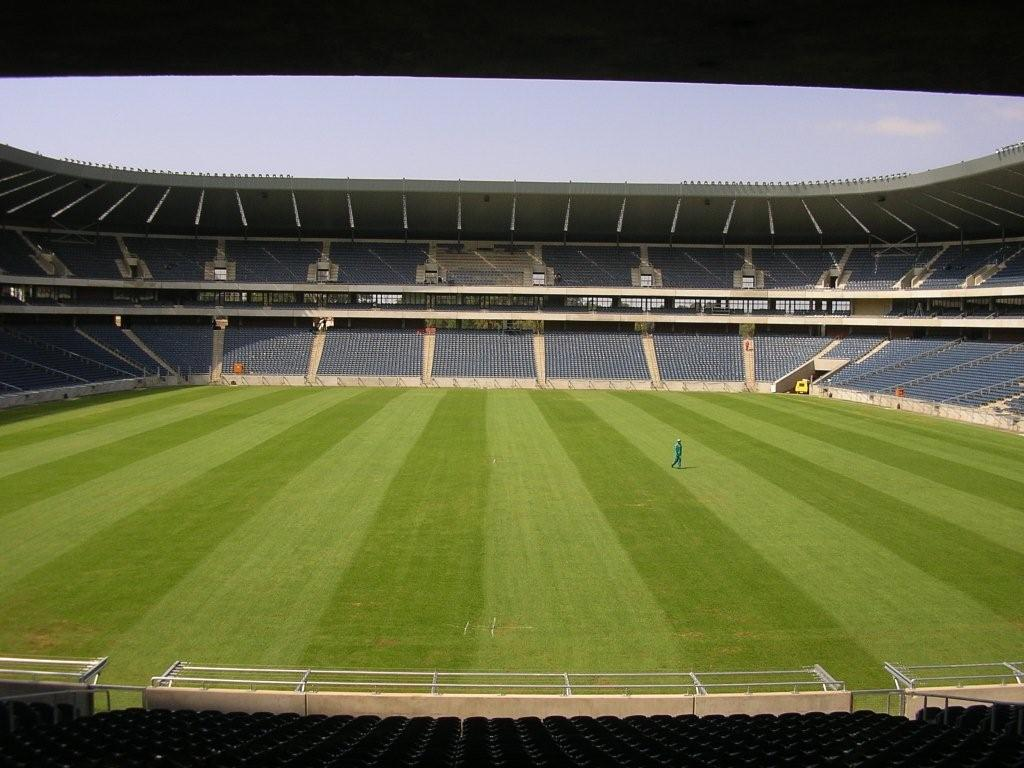
Orlando Stadium in Johannesburg, South Africa, hosted the first leg.

Assistant referees:
Jerson Emiliano Dos Santos (Angola)
Arsénio Chadreque Marengula (Mozambique)

=== Second leg ===
29 November 2015
15:00 UTC+1

Étoile du Sahel (Tunisia)	1–0	(South Africa) Orlando Pirates
Jemal 24'	Report

Stade Olympique de Sousse, Sousse
Referee: Néant Alioum (Cameroon)

Étoile du Sahel	Orlando Pirates

GK	(Tunisia) Aymen Mathlouthi
DF	(Tunisia) Hamdi Nagguez
DF	(Tunisia) Ammar Jemal
DF	(Tunisia) Zied Boughattas
DF	(Tunisia) Marouane Tej	(substituted off) 84'
MF	(Tunisia) Aymen Trabelsi
MF	(Cameroon) Franck Kom
MF	(Tunisia) Hamza Lahmar
MF	(Tunisia) Alaya Brigui
MF	(Tunisia) Iheb Msakni
FW	(Algeria) Baghdad Bounedjah	(substituted off) 20'
Substitutes:
MF	(Tunisia) Mehdi Saada	(substituted in) 84'
FW	(Brazil) Diogo	(substituted in) 20'
Manager:
(Tunisia) Faouzi Benzarti

GK	(Equatorial Guinea) Felipe Ovono
DF	(South Africa) Thabo Matlaba
DF	(South Africa) Ayanda Gcaba
DF	(South Africa) Siyabonga Sangweni
DF	(South Africa) Happy Jele
MF	(South Africa) Lehlogonolo Masalesa
MF	(South Africa) Gift Motupa
MF	(South Africa) Mpho Makola	(substituted off) 71'
MF	(South Africa) Thabo Rakhale	(substituted off) 71'
FW	(South Africa) Kermit Erasmus
FW	(South Africa) Thamsanqa Gabuza
Substitutes:
GK	(South Africa) Brighton Mhlongo
DF	(South Africa) Ntsikelelo Nyauza
MF	(Senegal) Issa Sarr
DF	(South Africa) Rooi Mahamutsa
MF	(South Africa) Sifiso Myeni	(substituted in) 71'
MF	(South Africa) Menzi Masuku	(substituted in) 71'
FW	(South Africa) Lehlohonolo Majoro
Manager:
(South Africa) Eric Tinkler

Assistant referees:
Evarist Menkouande (Cameroon)
Elvis Guy Noupue Nguegoue (Cameroon)
