= 2015 CAF Confederation Cup knockout stage =

The 2015 CAF Confederation Cup knockout stage was played from 26 September to 29 November 2015. A total of four teams competed in the knockout stage to decide the champions of the 2015 CAF Confederation Cup.

== Qualified teams ==
The winners and runners-up of each of the two groups in the group stage qualified for the knockout stage.

Group	Winners	Runners-up
A	(Egypt) Al-Ahly	(Tunisia) Étoile du Sahel
B	(Egypt) Zamalek	(South Africa) Orlando Pirates

== Format ==
Knockout ties were played on a home-and-away two-legged basis. If the aggregate score was tied after the second leg, the away goals rule would be applied, and if still level, the penalty shoot-out would be used to determine the winner (no extra time would be played).

== Schedule ==
The schedule of each round was as follows.

Round	First leg	Second leg
Semi-finals	25–27 September 2015	2–4 October 2015
Final	20–22 November 2015	27–29 November 2015

== Bracket ==
In the semi-finals, the group A winners played the group B runners-up, and the group B winners played the group A runners-up, with the group winners hosting the second leg.

In the final, the order of legs was determined by a draw, held after the group stage draw (5 May 2015, 11:00 UTC+2, at the CAF headquarters in Cairo, Egypt).

Semi-finals
1	(South Africa) Orlando Pirates	1	4	5
4	(Egypt) Al-Ahly	0	3	3
3	(Tunisia) Étoile du Sahel	5	0	5
2	(Egypt) Zamalek	1	3	4

Final
(South Africa) Orlando Pirates	1	0	1
(Tunisia) Étoile du Sahel	1	1	2

== Semi-finals ==
Team 1	Agg.	Team 2	1st leg	2nd leg
Orlando Pirates (South Africa)	5–3	(Egypt) Al-Ahly	1–0	4–3
Étoile du Sahel (Tunisia)	5–4	(Egypt) Zamalek	5–1	0–3

26 September 2015
18:00 UTC+2

Orlando Pirates (South Africa)	1–0	(Egypt) Al-Ahly
Gabuza 8'	Report

Orlando Stadium, Johannesburg
Referee: Malang Diedhiou (Senegal)
4 October 2015
20:30 UTC+2

Al-Ahly (Egypt)	3–4	(South Africa) Orlando Pirates
Evouna 43', 53'; Gamal 90'	Report	Erasmus 57'; Gabuza 75'; Matlaba 85'; Rakhale 90+5'

Suez Stadium, Suez
Referee: Mehdi Abid Charef (Algeria)

Orlando Pirates won 5–3 on aggregate.

27 September 2015
20:00 UTC+1

Étoile du Sahel (Tunisia)	5–1	(Egypt) Zamalek
Tej 5', 83'; Bounedjah 10'; Brigui 35'; Ben Aziza 85'	Report	Hefny 24'

Stade Olympique de Sousse, Sousse
Referee: Bernard Camille (Seychelles)
3 October 2015
20:30 UTC+2

Zamalek (Egypt)	3–0	(Tunisia) Étoile du Sahel
Kahraba 11', 55' (pen.); Fathi 69'	Report

Petro Sport Stadium, Cairo
Referee: Bakary Gassama (Gambia)

Étoile du Sahel won 5–4 on aggregate.

== Final ==
Team 1	Agg.	Team 2	1st leg	2nd leg
Orlando Pirates (South Africa)	1–2	(Tunisia) Étoile du Sahel	1–1	0–1

21 November 2015
20:00 UTC+2

Orlando Pirates (South Africa)	1–1	(Tunisia) Étoile du Sahel
Gabuza 36'	Report	Jemal 87'

Orlando Stadium, Johannesburg
Referee: Janny Sikazwe (Zambia)
29 November 2015
15:00 UTC+1

Étoile du Sahel (Tunisia)	1–0	(South Africa) Orlando Pirates
Jemal 24'	Report

Stade Olympique de Sousse, Sousse
Referee: Néant Alioum (Cameroon)

Étoile du Sahel won 2–1 on aggregate.
