= 2019 Arab Club Champions Cup final =

2019 Zayed Champions Cup final
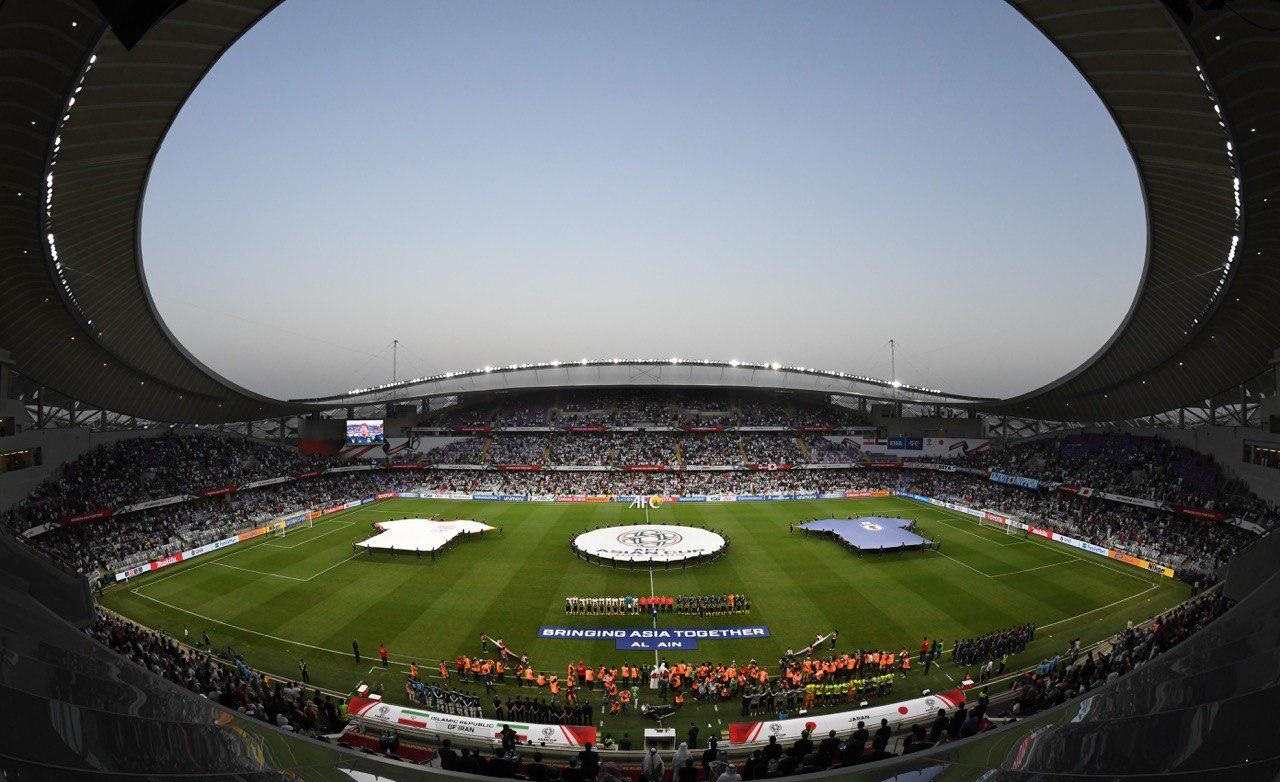
- Hazza bin Zayed Stadium hosted the podium where ES Sahel lifted the trophy
- Event: 2018–19 Arab Club Champions Cup
Al Hilal	ES Sahel
(Saudi Arabia)	(Tunisia)
1	2
- Date: 18 April 2019
- Venue: Hazza bin Zayed Stadium, Al Ain
- Referee: Mohammed Abdulla (United Arab Emirates)
- Attendance: 15,000

The 2019 Arab Club Champions Cup final was the final match of the 2018–19 Arab Club Champions Cup, the 28th season of the Arab League's main club football tournament organised by UAFA, and the 1st season since it was renamed from the Arab Club Championship to the Arab Club Champions Cup.

The match was played by Étoile Sportive du Sahel of Tunisia and Al Hilal SFC of Saudi Arabia, and held at the Hazza bin Zayed Stadium in Al Ain, United Arab Emirates.

Étoile Sportive du Sahel defeated Al-Hilal SFC 2–1 in the final and won the title for the first time in their history, becoming the third Tunisian team to win the competition in the last five editions.

== Teams ==
Team	Previous finals appearances (bold indicates winners)
(Saudi Arabia) Al Hilal SFC	3 (1989, **1994**, **1995**)
(Tunisia) Étoile Sportive du Sahel	0

== Venue ==
The Hazza bin Zayed Stadium is a multi-purpose stadium, located in the City of Al Ain, Emirate of Abu Dhabi, United Arab Emirates. It is the home stadium of Al Ain FC of the UAE Pro-League. The stadium holds 22,717 spectators and opened in 2014. The stadium was named after the chairman of the club, Sheikh Hazza bin Zayed bin Sultan Al Nahyan.

The 45,000 m^{2} (480,000 sq ft) Hazza bin Zayed stadium is split over seven levels, and is one of the most modern sporting venues in the Middle East. It is one of the most sophisticated sports venues in the region.

== Route to the final ==
Al Hilal SFC				Round	Étoile Sportive du Sahel			
Opponent	Agg.	1st leg	2nd leg		Opponent	Agg.	1st leg	2nd leg
(Oman) Al-Shabab	2–0	1–0 (H)	1–0 (A)	First round	(Jordan) Al-Ramtha	6–2	3–1 (A)	3–1 (H)
(Iraq) Al-Naft	6–0	4–0 (H)	2–0 (A)	Second round	(Morocco) Wydad Casablanca	0–1	0–0 (A)	0–1 (H)
(Egypt) Al-Ittihad Alexandria	3–0	3–0 (H)	0–0 (A)	Quarter-finals	(Morocco) Raja CA	1–2	0–2 (A)	1–0 (H)
(Saudi Arabia) Al Ahli Saudi FC	1–1 (3–2 p)	1–0 (H)	0–1 (A)	Semi-finals	(Sudan) Al-Merrikh	1–0	1–0 (H)	0–0 (A)

== Match ==
=== Details ===
18 April 2019
17:50 UTC+4

Al-Hilal (Saudi Arabia)	1–2	(Tunisia) Étoile du Sahel
Gomis 64' (pen.)	Report	Aribi 30'; Mothnani 90+1'

Hazza bin Zayed Stadium, Al Ain
Attendance: 15,000
Referee: Mohammed Abdulla (United Arab Emirates)

**Al Hilal**	**ES Sahel**

GK	1	(Saudi Arabia) Abdullah Al-Mayouf
DF	2	(Saudi Arabia) Mohammed Al-Breik
DF	4	(Spain) Alberto Botía	(yellow card) 45+5'
DF	5	(Saudi Arabia) Ali Al-Bulaihi	(yellow card) 90+5'
DF	12	(Saudi Arabia) Yasser Al-Shahrani
MF	6	(Saudi Arabia) Abdulmalek Al-Khaibri		(substituted off) 46'
MF	18	(Saudi Arabia) Mohamed Kanno
MF	15	(Egypt) Ahmed Ashraf		(substituted off) 56'
MF	29	(Saudi Arabia) Salem Al-Dawsari
FW	3	(Brazil) Carlos Eduardo
FW	11	(France) Bafétimbi Gomis
Substitutions:
GK	26	(Saudi Arabia) Mohammed Al-Waked
DF	70	(Saudi Arabia) Mohammed Jahfali
DF	13	(Saudi Arabia) Hassan Kadesh
MF	7	(Saudi Arabia) Nasser Al-Dawsari
MF	24	(Saudi Arabia) Nawaf Al-Abed		(substituted on) 56'
MF	10	(Saudi Arabia) Mohammad Al-Shalhoub		(substituted on) 46'
MF	25	(Spain) Jonathan Soriano
Manager:
(Croatia) Zoran Mamić

GK	1	(Tunisia) Walid Kridene
DF	15	(Tunisia) Zied Boughattas	(yellow card) 58'
DF	2	(Tunisia) Saddam Ben Aziza	(yellow card) 45'
DF	4	(Mali) Mohamed Konaté
MF	12	(Tunisia) Mortadha Ben Ouanes	(yellow card) 53'
MF	25	(Tunisia) Karim Aouadhi	(yellow card) 45+1'
MF	29	(Tunisia) Mohamed Amine Ben Amor		(substituted off) 88'
MF	19	(Tunisia) Maher Hannachi	(yellow card) 75'
MF	10	(Tunisia) Iheb Msakni		(substituted off) 72'
MF	17	(Tunisia) Yassine Chikhaoui (c)	(yellow card) 45+7'
FW	35	(Tunisia) Karim Aribi
Substitutions:
GK	16	(Tunisia) Makram Bediri
MF	8	(Tunisia) Alaya Brigui
MF	14	(Tunisia) Mohammad Mothnani	(yellow card) 90+1'	(substituted on) 88'
MF	18	(Tunisia) Firas Ben Larbi
MF	20	(Tunisia) Malek Baayou		(substituted on) 72'
FW	7	(Venezuela) Darwin González
FW	22	(Tunisia) Hazem Haj Hassan
Manager:
(France) Roger Lemerre

Assistant referees:
Mohamed Ahmed Yousef Al Hammadi (United Arab Emirates)
Masoud Hassan Fard (United Arab Emirates)

Fourth official:
Noureddine Jaafari (Morocco)

**Match rules**
- 90 minutes
- Penalty shoot-out if scores still level
- Maximum of seven named substitutes
- Maximum of three substitutions
