= Milutin Sredojević =

Serbian football manager (born 1969)

Personal information
- Date of birth: 1 September 1969 (age 57)
- Place of birth: Prokuplje, SFR Yugoslavia
- Position: Striker

Youth career
- 1980–1987: Olimpija Ljubljana

Senior career*
Years	Team	Apps	(Gls)
1987–1988	Svoboda Ljubljana		
1988–1989	Sinđelić Belgrade		
1989–1991	Grafičar Belgrade		
1991–1993	Zorka Subotica		
1993–1994	Pionir Subotica		

Managerial career
- 1994–2000: Palić
- 2000–2001: Spartak Subotica
- 2001: Yugoslavia U20
- 2002–2004: SC Villa
- 2004–2006: Saint-George SA
- 2006: Orlando Pirates
- 2007: Young Africans FC
- 2007–2010: Saint-George SA
- 2010–2011: Al-Hilal Omdurman
- 2011–2013: Rwanda
- 2013–2017: Uganda
- 2017–2019: Orlando Pirates
- 2019: Zamalek
- 2020–2021: Zambia
- 2021–2023: Uganda
- 2023–2024: Libya
- 2025: Al Merrikh
- 2025–2026: ES Sétif
- * Club domestic league appearances and goals

Milutin Sredojević (Serbian Cyrillic: Милутин Средојевић; born 1 September 1969) is a Serbian football manager.

== Playing career ==
Sredojević formerly played for Svoboda Ljubljana, Sinđelić Belgrade, Grafičar Belgrade, Zorka Subotica and Pionir Subotica. He operated as a defensive midfielder but was cut short by a recurring knee injury but he opted to cross to coaching to stay in the game of football.

== Managerial career ==
=== SC Villa ===
Micho was in his early 30s when he set off on his African adventure that started at Kampala club SC Villa. He was scouted by John Kevin Aliro who worked with the Radio France International At Villa, Micho was part of helping win 3 league titles (2002, 2002–03 and 2004). In 2002, Villa won the league title with one loss in 28 games, and won the Uganda Cup. They were CECAFA Club victors after 17 years.

=== Saint-George ===
Micho signed a three-year contract with St. George on 19 July 2004 and He replaced a Dutch national When he joined St. George and he guided them to 2004/05, 2005/06 and 2007/08 to league success picking up 19 wins, 5 draws and no loss in 2007/08 season. He was also voted best coach of the season for the third time after guiding the same team to league success in 2004/05 and 2005/06 season.

=== Orlando Pirates ===
On 14 June 2006, Sredojević was appointed as the new head coach of South African Premier Soccer League giants Orlando Pirates replacing Kosta Papić who resigned and joined Maritzburg United the Serbian had a relative success in continental club competitions guiding South African giants Orlando Pirates to the semi-finals of the African Champions League in 2006. Micho is remembered by giving teenage Senzo Meyiwa a debut against AmaZulu in a league match won 2–1 by The Bucs at Ellis Park on 8 November 2006. Micho was at Orlando Pirates for 217 days. On 16 January 2007, Micho parted ways with Orlando Pirates.

=== Young Africans FC ===
Micho joined Young Africans FC in 2007 and helped them win the league title.

=== Saint-George ===
Returned to Saint-George SA in 2007 up to 2010. St. George lifted the aforementioned Midroc Ethiopia Millennium trophy on 1 June with Saladin Said with an incredible 21 goals became top scorer 2007–2008, in 2008-2009 won the Ethiopian Premier league, Ethiopian national cup trophy and Ethiopian Super cup. In 2009-2010 won again the Ethiopian Premier League, he guided saint George to CECAFA CLUB CHAMPIONSHIP KAGAME CUP finals 2010 IN Kigali Rwanda though APR FC won it by 2goals to 0 Malawian born striker, Chiukepo Msowoya, scored the first goal on the 92nd minute of extra-time and set the second goal for Victor Nyirenda to seal the victory on the 96th minute.

=== Al-Hilal Sudan ===
Sredojević took over Al-Hilal Omdurman in July 2010. He managed the team for two seasons in 2010 and 2011, where he won two league titles, reached the semi-finals of the CAF Confederation Cup in 2010 and semi-finals of the 2011 CAF Champions League where they lost to CS Sfaxien of Tunisia in penalty after 1–1 aggregate.

=== Rwanda ===
On 1 November 2011, Sredojević was unveiled as the new head coach of the Rwanda, Sredojević replaced Ghanaian SellasTetteh, who left the post two months ago after a 5–0 defeat to Ivory Coast in a 2012 African Nations Cup qualifier, He was chosen from a five-man shortlist that included Stephen Keshi, Ratomir Dujković, Patrice Neveu and Branko Smiljanić. Micho guided Rwanda to group stages of the 2014 FIFA world Cup qualifiers in Group H along with Algeria, Mali and Benin after winning 4–2 goal aggregate against Eritrea. He was fired on 17 April.

=== Uganda ===
He became manager of Uganda in May 2013 after defeating other 37 people who had applied for the post. The appointment follows the sacking of Scotsman Robert ‘Bobby’ Williamson in April 2013, he signed a two-year contract well as Sam Timbe and Kefa Kisala were also announced as assistant coaches, while Fred Kajoba retained his position as goalkeepers’ coach. Sredojević's first assignment as Cranes coach was between Libya versus Uganda at Tripoli International Stadium and at the end of the match Libya defeated Uganda by 3 goals to 0 which were scored in the first half, in that game 6 of Cranes 22 players in Libya were debutantes and these were Herman Wasswa, Richard Kasagga, Israel Emuge, William Luwagga Kizito, Alex Kakuba and Ali Kimera.

==== CHAN 2014 ====
In January 2014, coach Sedrojevic, invited him to be included in the 23 player team for the 2014 African Nations Championship. The team placed third in the group stage of the competition after beating Burkina Faso, drawing with Zimbabwe and losing to Morocco. Uganda finished third in Group E with seven points in AFRICON 2015 qualifiers where by Togo leading Ghana second and Guinea at the bottom.

==== 2015 ====
On 1 April 2015 FUFA president Moses Magogo added Micho a 3 years contract after he registered 60 percent success in the matches he handled, Micho handled the Uganda Cranes in 35 matches registering 18 victories, 5 draws and 12 losses since 2013 to 2015. On 26 October 2015 Micho guided back Uganda Cranes to 2016 CHAN Championship in Rwanda after beating hosts Sudan 2–0 goals were scored by Caesar Okhuti and Farouk Miya at the Khartoum National Stadium to qualify on a 4–0 goal aggregate, this was Uganda's third appearance at the CHAN finals after the tournaments in Sudan and South Africa in 2011 and 2014 respectively. In CECAFA 2015 The Cranes topped Group B after winning against Burundi and Zanzibar before overcoming Malawi in the quarter finals. In the semifinals, Micho's side overcame the host nation, Ethiopia 5–3 following a goalless draw in normal time and the 30 extra added minutes. Micho won his first Cecafa title for Uganda in 2015 after beating Rwanda 1–0 in the final and the goal was scored by Caesar Okhuti in the 15th minute. Under Micho's guidance The Cranes convincingly swept aside The Sparrow Hawks of Togo to progress to the group stages of the 2018 World Cup qualifiers in a resounding 4–0 aggregate win over Togo over two legs – 0–1 at the Stade de Kegue and other 3–0 in the return at Mandela National Stadium, Namboole was just enough to put Cranes in the group stages.

==== 2016 ====
At CHAN 2016 Uganda Cranes finished in the third position in group D, where Zambia led the group followed by Mali and Zimbabwe last. On 4 September 2016, Micho led the Uganda Cranes team to qualifications for the Africa Cup of Nations for the first time in 38 years. The Cranes finished the qualification round very strongly as Group D runners-up, behind west African side Burkina Faso who needed a late win over Botswana, with 13 points safe in the bag, Uganda finished as one of the two best group runners-up to finally progress to the elusive stage. The Africa Cup of Nations draw placed Egypt, Mali and Ghana in Uganda's Group D. on 7 January 2016 Uganda attained the best ever position on the FIFA rankings in the 62nd out of the 209 FIFA Member Associations. Micho guided Uganda after 38 year old jinx to qualify for the biggest continental football fiesta – the African Cup of Nations, Farouk Miya scored 1–0 against the Island nation, Comoros in the 35th minute. Micho takes credit for developing the goalkeeper Denis Onyango, who has just been named African Player of the Year based in Africa for 2016, having worked with him in his first spell in Uganda. In December 2016, Sredojević was among the nominees for the prestigious CAF Coach of the Year Award following his exploits in 2016. Uganda was voted as a national team of the year 2016 in CAF awards Sredojević has so far won 14 league titles in five different big clubs in the African continent.

==== 2017 ====
In February 2017, in the last days of the winter transfer period, coach Sredojević recommended Khalid Aucho to join Red Star Belgrade.

On Saturday, 29 July 2017 during a fully packed press conference held at Pine Hall, Kabira Country Club in Kampala, Sredojević confirmed the termination of the employment contract with Uganda football governing body which had occurred on Friday, 28 July 2017 at 8 p.m. due to non payment of salaries for several months.

=== Orlando Pirates ===
On Thursday 3 August 2017, Orlando Pirates FC officially announced the return of coach Sredojević to the South African top-flight football club following his departure from the Uganda Cranes. Sredojević replaced Kjell Jonevret who had resigned on Wednesday 2 August 2017. Micho's first game as the manager of Orlando Pirates was against Chippa's United, Orlando Pirates won the match 1–0 which was scored by Thamsanqa Gabuza. Micho used the following line up in that game Wayne Sandilands as the goalkeeper, Gladwin Shitolo, Ntsikelelo Nyauza, Thabo Matlaba, Innocent Maela, Abbubaker Mobara, Thamsanqa Sangweni, Mpho Makola (Issa Sarr 84'), Thabo Qalinge, Musa Nyatama, (Luvuyo Memela 62'), Thamsanqa Gabuza (Tendai Ndoro 77') During his first season in ABSA Premier League Micho led Orlando Pirates to a second-place finish on the Absa Premiership log, as well as qualifying the team for the CAF Champions League. While at Orlando Pirates he was in charge of 80 games across all competitions, winning 38, drawing 26, while losing 16 and on 16 August 2019 he retired as Orlando Pirates manager. It was later revealed that Micho resigned and left the country because he had been accused of rape.

=== Zamalek ===
On 17 August 2019, it was announced that Sredojević will be joining Zamalek SC as their new manager; he signed a one-year contract. His uncle Dušan Nenković had also coached Zamalek SC from 1985 to 1986.

On 2 December 2019, Zamalek announced that Sredojević has been sacked less than four months into his new job.

=== Zambia ===
On 3 February 2020, Sredojević was unveiled as the head coach of Zambia national team, where he signed a two-year contract.

On 17 July 2021, the Football Association of Zambia announced Sredojević had left his role via mutual consent.

=== Uganda ===
On 27 July 2021, he was announced as the new Head Coach of the Uganda national team, he signed a three-year contract. however on 14 September 2023 his contract was mutually terminated.

=== ES Sétif ===
On 18 November 2025, he was appointed manager of Algerian club ES Sétif.On 15 February 2026, he was sacked due to bad results.

== Managerial statistics ==
As of 7 March 2026

Managerial record by team and tenure
Team	Nat	From	To	Record							
Team	Nat	From	To	G	W	D	L	GF	GA	GD	Win %
Saint George	(Ethiopia)	1 July 2004	13 June 2006	62	46	10	6	140	33	+107	74.19
Saint George	(Ethiopia)	1 January 2008	26 June 2010	81	55	21	5	167	55	+112	67.90
Al Hilal Omdurman	(Sudan)	27 June 2010	3 October 2011	32	22	5	5	73	23	+50	68.75
Rwanda	(Rwanda)	1 November 2011	17 April 2013	25	8	8	9	31	35	−4	32.00
Uganda	(Uganda)	20 May 2013	29 July 2017	59	25	13	21	50	46	+4	42.37
Orlando Pirates	(Egypt)	3 August 2017	16 August 2019	80	39	28	13	115	70	+45	48.75
Zamalek	(Egypt)	17 August 2019	2 December 2019	11	7	1	3	24	10	+14	63.64
Zambia	(Zambia)	26 January 2020	17 July 2021	16	8	4	4	25	20	+5	50.00
Uganda	(Uganda)	18 July 2021	15 September 2023	23	6	7	10	20	27	−7	26.09
Libya	(Libya)	5 October 2023	14 September 2024	15	8	5	2	22	12	+10	53.33
Al Merrikh	(Sudan)	16 January 2025	12 April 2025	12	5	2	5	17	12	+5	41.67
ES Sétif	(Tunisia)	18 November 2025	15 February 2026	12	4	3	5	14	13	+1	33.33
Career total				428	233	107	88	698	356	+342	54.44

== Background ==
Sredojević studied history and geography, and he is grandson of WWI hero Milutin; Prokuplje, an old Byzantine village is the place where Sredojević was born. Sredojević is a cousin brother to coach Aleksandar Janković.

== Role models ==
Sredojević has respect for role model coaches including Miljan Miljanić (former Yugoslavia, Real Madrid) and Tomislav Ivić, regarded as the father of zonal pressing in modern football. Sredojević is an admirer of late Johan Cruyff, who he considers “fathers of modern coaching”.

== Managerial honors ==
SC Villa

- Ugandan Premier League: 3

2002, 2002–03, 2004

- Ugandan Cup: 1

2002

- CECAFA Clubs Cup: 1

2003

Saint-George

- Ethiopian Premier League: 5

2005, 2006, 2008, 2009, 2010,

- Ethiopian Super Cup: 2

2005, 2009

Al-Hilal Omdurman

- Sudan Premier League: 1

2010

- Sudan Cup: 1

2011

Rwanda

- CECAFA Cup
  - Runners-up (1): 2011

Uganda

- CECAFA Cup: 1

2015

Zamalek

- Egypt Cup: 2018–2019

Individual honors

- Best Uganda Super League Coach of the Year: 3

2002, 2003, 2004

- Coach of the Year Ethiopian Premier League: 5

2004/05, 2005/06, 2007/08, 2008/09, 2009/10

- Coach of the Year Sudan Premier League: 1

2010/11

- African Cup of Champions Clubs / CAF Champions League:

2011 – Semi-finals

- African Cup Winners' Cup \ CAF Confederation Cup:

2010 – Semi-finals

- Absa Premiership Month Award for January 2018
