= 2016 CAF Super Cup =

2016 Orange CAF Super Cup
TP Mazembe	Étoile du Sahel
(Democratic Republic of the Congo)	(Tunisia)
2	1
- Date: 20 February 2016
- Venue: Stade TP Mazembe, Lubumbashi
- Referee: Hamada Nampiandraza (Madagascar)

The 2016 CAF Super Cup (officially the 2016 Orange CAF Super Cup for sponsorship reasons) was the 24th CAF Super Cup, an annual football match in Africa organized by the Confederation of African Football (CAF), between the winners of the previous season's two CAF club competitions, the CAF Champions League and the CAF Confederation Cup.

The match was played between TP Mazembe of the Democratic Republic of the Congo, the 2015 CAF Champions League winner, and Étoile du Sahel of Tunisia, the 2015 CAF Confederation Cup winner. It was hosted by TP Mazembe at the Stade TP Mazembe in Lubumbashi on 20 February 2016.

TP Mazembe defeated Étoile du Sahel 2–1 to win the competition for the third time in its history.

== Teams ==
Team	Qualification	Previous participation (bold indicates winners)
(Democratic Republic of the Congo) TP Mazembe	2015 CAF Champions League winner	**2010**, **2011**
(Tunisia) Étoile du Sahel	2015 CAF Confederation Cup winner	**1998**, 2004, 2007, **2008**

== Rules ==
The CAF Super Cup was played as a single match, with the CAF Champions League winner hosting the match. If the score was tied at the end of regulation, extra time would not be played, and the penalty shoot-out would be used to determine the winner (CAF Champions League Regulations XXVII and CAF Confederation Cup Regulations XXV).

== Match ==
20 February 2016
15:30 UTC+2

TP Mazembe (Democratic Republic of the Congo)	2–1	(Tunisia) Étoile du Sahel
Adjei 19', 45+1'	Report	Msakni 45+2'

Stade TP Mazembe, Lubumbashi
Referee: Hamada Nampiandraza (Madagascar)

**TP Mazembe**	**Étoile du Sahel**

GK	22	(Ivory Coast) Sylvain Gbohouo
DF	2	(Democratic Republic of the Congo) Joël Kimwaki (c)	(yellow card) 56'
DF	3	(Democratic Republic of the Congo) Jean Kasusula
DF	6	(Mali) Salif Coulibaly
DF	14	(Zambia) Kabaso Chongo	(yellow card) 75'
MF	12	(Democratic Republic of the Congo) Merveille Bokadi
MF	13	(Zambia) Nathan Sinkala
MF	19	(Ghana) Daniel Nii Adjei		(substituted off) 87'
FW	7	(Ivory Coast) Roger Assalé		(substituted off) 67'
FW	11	(Mali) Adama Traoré		(substituted off) 78'
FW	17	(Democratic Republic of the Congo) Jonathan Bolingi
Substitutes:
GK	1	(Democratic Republic of the Congo) Robert Kidiaba
DF	4	(Democratic Republic of the Congo) Patient Mwepu
DF	25	(Democratic Republic of the Congo) Christian Luyindama
FW	10	(Zambia) Given Singuluma		(substituted on) 87'
FW	16	(Ivory Coast) Christian Koffi
FW	23	(Democratic Republic of the Congo) Elia Meschak		(substituted on) 67'
FW	28	(Tanzania) Thomas Ulimwengu		(substituted on) 78'
Manager:
(France) Hubert Velud

GK	1	(Tunisia) Aymen Mathlouthi (c)
DF	3	(Tunisia) Ghazi Abderrazzak
DF	5	(Tunisia) Ammar Jemal	(yellow card) 70'
DF	8	(Tunisia) Alaya Brigui
DF	15	(Tunisia) Zied Boughattas	(yellow card) 64'
MF	10	(Tunisia) Iheb Msakni
MF	12	(Cameroon) Franck Kom	(yellow card) 41'
MF	26	(Tunisia) Rami Bedoui		(substituted off) 33'
MF	29	(Tunisia) Mohamed Ben Amor
FW	7	(Tunisia) Hamza Lahmar		(substituted off) 65'
FW	9	(Tunisia) Ahmed Akaïchi		(substituted off) 85'
Substitutes:
GK	22	(Tunisia) Zied Jebali
DF	4	(Tunisia) Saddam Ben Aziza
DF	17	(Tunisia) Marouane Tej		(substituted on) 85'
FW	18	(Brazil) Diogo da Silva		(substituted on) 33'
MF	20	(Tunisia) Nidhal Saïed
FW	24	(Mali) Michailou Dramé		(substituted on) 65'
MF	27	(Tunisia) Aymen Trabelsi
Manager:
(Tunisia) Faouzi Benzarti

Assistant referees:
Berhe O'Michael (Eritrea)
Mohammed Abdallah Ibrahim (Sudan)
Fourth official:
Davies Omweno (Kenya)

== Prize money ==
The winner earned $75k USD and the runner-up received $50k USD.
