= 2015 CAF Confederation Cup group stage =

- Dates: 26 June – 13 September 2015

Tournament statistics
- Matches played: 24
- Goals scored: 42 (1.75 per match)

The 2015 CAF Confederation Cup group stage was played from 26 June to 13 September 2015. A total of eight teams competed in the group stage to decide the four places in the knockout stage of the 2015 CAF Confederation Cup.

== Draw ==
The draw for the group stage was held on 5 May 2015, 11:00 UTC+2, at the CAF headquarters in Cairo, Egypt. The eight winners of the play-off round were drawn into two groups of four. There were no seedings.

The following eight teams were entered into the draw, whose identity were not known at the time of the draw:

- (Egypt) Al-Ahly
- (Tunisia) Espérance de Tunis
- (Republic of the Congo) AC Léopards
- (Tunisia) CS Sfaxien
- (Mali) Stade Malien
- (South Africa) Orlando Pirates
- (Egypt) Zamalek
- (Tunisia) Étoile du Sahel

== Format ==
Each group was played on a home-and-away round-robin basis. The winners and runners-up of each group advanced to the semi-finals.

=== Tiebreakers ===
The teams were ranked according to points (3 points for a win, 1 point for a draw, 0 points for a loss). If tied on points, tiebreakers would be applied in the following order:

1. Number of points obtained in games between the teams concerned;
2. Goal difference in games between the teams concerned;
3. Goals scored in games between the teams concerned;
4. Away goals scored in games between the teams concerned;
5. If, after applying criteria 1 to 4 to several teams, two teams still have an equal ranking, criteria 1 to 4 are reapplied exclusively to the matches between the two teams in question to determine their final rankings. If this procedure does not lead to a decision, criteria 6 to 9 apply;
6. Goal difference in all games;
7. Goals scored in all games;
8. Away goals scored in all games;
9. Drawing of lots.

== Groups ==
The matchdays were 26–28 June, 10–12 July, 24–26 July, 7–9 August, 21–23 August, and 11–13 September 2015.

=== Group A ===
| Pos | Team | Pld | W | D | L | GF | GA | GD | Pts | Qualification | AHL | ESS | STA | EST |
|---|---|---|---|---|---|---|---|---|---|---|---|---|---|---|
| 1 | (Egypt) Al-Ahly | 6 | 4 | 1 | 1 | 6 | 1 | +5 | 13 | Advance to knockout stage | — | 1–0 | 1–0 | 3–0 |
| 2 | (Tunisia) Étoile du Sahel | 6 | 4 | 1 | 1 | 6 | 3 | +3 | 13 | Advance to knockout stage | 1–0 | — | 1–0 | 2–1 |
| 3 | (Mali) Stade Malien | 6 | 1 | 2 | 3 | 3 | 5 | −2 | 5 | | 0–0 | 1–1 | — | 0–1 |
| 4 | (Tunisia) Espérance de Tunis | 6 | 1 | 0 | 5 | 3 | 9 | −6 | 3 | | 0–1 | 0–1 | 1–2 | — |

Source: CAF
Rules for classification: Group stage tiebreakers
26 June 2015
22:00 UTC+1

| Étoile du Sahel (Tunisia) | 1–0 | (Mali) Stade Malien |
|---|---|---|
| Bounedjah 69' | Report |

Stade Olympique de Sousse, Sousse
Referee: Juste Ephrem Zio (Burkina Faso)
28 June 2015
22:00 UTC+2

| Al-Ahly (Egypt) | 3–0 | (Tunisia) Espérance de Tunis |
|---|---|---|
| Said 20', 58'; Zakaria 90' | Report |

Suez Stadium, Suez
Referee: Néant Alioum (Cameroon)

11 July 2015
22:00 UTC+1

| Espérance de Tunis (Tunisia) | 0–1 | (Tunisia) Étoile du Sahel |
|---|---|---|
| | Report | Jemal 49' |

Stade Olympique de Radès, Radès
Attendance: 30,000
Referee: Eric Otogo-Castane (Gabon)
12 July 2015
16:30 UTC±0

| Stade Malien (Mali) | 0–0 | (Egypt) Al-Ahly |
|---|---|---|
| | Report |

Stade Modibo Kéïta, Bamako
Referee: Thierry Nkurunziza (Burundi)

25 July 2015
19:00 UTC+2

| Al-Ahly (Egypt) | 1–0 | (Tunisia) Étoile du Sahel |
|---|---|---|
| Soliman 36' | Report |

Suez Stadium, Suez
Referee: Malang Diedhiou (Senegal)
25 July 2015
19:45 UTC+1

| Espérance de Tunis (Tunisia) | 1–2 | (Mali) Stade Malien |
|---|---|---|
| Ben Youssef 11' | Report | Sissoko 5'; Ma. Coulibaly 48' |

Stade Olympique de Radès, Radès
Referee: Janny Sikazwe (Zambia)

8 August 2015
21:00 UTC+1

| Étoile du Sahel (Tunisia) | 1–0 | (Egypt) Al-Ahly |
|---|---|---|
| Mouihbi 26' (pen.) | Report |

Stade Olympique de Sousse, Sousse
Referee: Bouchaïb El Ahrach (Morocco)
9 August 2015
16:30 UTC±0

| Stade Malien (Mali) | 0–1 | (Tunisia) Espérance de Tunis |
|---|---|---|
| | Report | Eduok 24' |

Stade Modibo Kéïta, Bamako
Referee: Victor Gomes (South Africa)

The Stade Malien v Espérance de Tunis match was suspended at the 49th minute due to heavy rain, and was resumed on 10 August 2015, 16:30 UTC±0, from the point of abandonment.

22 August 2015
19:00 UTC+1

| Espérance de Tunis (Tunisia) | 0–1 | (Egypt) Al-Ahly |
|---|---|---|
| | Report | Antwi 5' |

Stade Olympique de Radès, Radès
Referee: Hamada Nampiandraza (Madagascar)
23 August 2015
15:30 UTC±0

| Stade Malien (Mali) | 1–1 | (Tunisia) Étoile du Sahel |
|---|---|---|
| Mo. Coulibaly 90+5' | Report | Bangoura 58' |

Stade Modibo Kéïta, Bamako
Referee: Ali Lemghaifry (Mauritania)

12 September 2015
19:30 UTC+1

| Étoile du Sahel (Tunisia) | 2–1 | (Tunisia) Espérance de Tunis |
|---|---|---|
| Bounedjah 90' (pen.), 90+3' | Report | Jouini 25' |

Stade Olympique de Sousse, Sousse
Referee: Mehdi Abid Charef (Algeria)
12 September 2015
20:30 UTC+2

| Al-Ahly (Egypt) | 1–0 | (Mali) Stade Malien |
|---|---|---|
| Gamal 75' | Report |

Suez Stadium, Suez
Referee: El Fadil Mohamed (Sudan)

=== Group B ===
| Pos | Team | Pld | W | D | L | GF | GA | GD | Pts | Qualification | ZAM | ORL | LEO | CSS |
|---|---|---|---|---|---|---|---|---|---|---|---|---|---|---|
| 1 | (Egypt) Zamalek | 6 | 5 | 0 | 1 | 12 | 4 | +8 | 15 | Advance to knockout stage | — | 4–1 | 2–0 | 1–0 |
| 2 | (South Africa) Orlando Pirates | 6 | 4 | 0 | 2 | 8 | 6 | +2 | 12 | Advance to knockout stage | 1–2 | — | 2–0 | 2–0 |
| 3 | (Republic of the Congo) AC Léopards | 6 | 1 | 2 | 3 | 2 | 6 | −4 | 5 | | 1–0 | 0–1 | — | 0–0 |
| 4 | (Tunisia) CS Sfaxien | 6 | 0 | 2 | 4 | 2 | 8 | −6 | 2 | | 1–3 | 0–1 | 1–1 | — |

Source: CAF
Rules for classification: Group stage tiebreakers
27 June 2015
15:30 UTC+1

| AC Léopards (Republic of the Congo) | 0–1 | (South Africa) Orlando Pirates |
|---|---|---|
| | Report | Jele 58' |

Stade Denis Sassou Nguesso, Dolisie
Referee: Malang Diedhiou (Senegal)
27 June 2015
21:30 UTC+2

| Zamalek (Egypt) | 1–0 | (Tunisia) CS Sfaxien |
|---|---|---|
| Cissé 90' | Report |

Petro Sport Stadium, Cairo
Referee: Mohamed Benouza (Algeria)

10 July 2015
22:00 UTC+1

| CS Sfaxien (Tunisia) | 1–1 | (Republic of the Congo) AC Léopards |
|---|---|---|
| Maâloul 48' (pen.) | Report | Gandzé 42' |

Stade Taïeb Mhiri, Sfax
Referee: Ali Lemghaifry (Mauritania)
11 July 2015
15:00 UTC+2

| Orlando Pirates (South Africa) | 1–2 | (Egypt) Zamalek |
|---|---|---|
| Majoro 68' | Report | Youssef 72'; Fathi 83' |

Mbombela Stadium, Nelspruit
Referee: Bernard Camille (Seychelles)

26 July 2015
19:30 UTC+2

| Zamalek (Egypt) | 2–0 | (Republic of the Congo) AC Léopards |
|---|---|---|
| Morsi 2'; Hefny 36' (pen.) | Report |

Petro Sport Stadium, Cairo
Referee: El Fadil Mohamed (Sudan)
26 July 2015
20:30 UTC+1

| CS Sfaxien (Tunisia) | 0–1 | (South Africa) Orlando Pirates |
|---|---|---|
| | Report | Rakhale 47' |

Stade Taïeb Mhiri, Sfax
Referee: Hamada Nampiandraza (Madagascar)

8 August 2015
20:15 UTC+2

| Orlando Pirates (South Africa) | 2–0 | (Tunisia) CS Sfaxien |
|---|---|---|
| Rakhale 37'; Masuku 53' | Report |

Orlando Stadium, Johannesburg
Referee: Joshua Bondo (Botswana)
9 August 2015
15:30 UTC+1

| AC Léopards (Republic of the Congo) | 1–0 | (Egypt) Zamalek |
|---|---|---|
| Mukendi 60' | Report |

Stade Denis Sassou Nguesso, Dolisie
Referee: Bamlak Tessema Weyesa (Ethiopia)

22 August 2015
18:00 UTC+2

| Orlando Pirates (South Africa) | 2–0 | (Republic of the Congo) AC Léopards |
|---|---|---|
| Makola 32'; Manyisa 87' | Report |

Orlando Stadium, Johannesburg
Referee: Davies Omweno (Kenya)
23 August 2015
19:30 UTC+1

| CS Sfaxien (Tunisia) | 1–3 | (Egypt) Zamalek |
|---|---|---|
| Maâloul 63' (pen.) | Report | Kahraba 54'; Hamoudi 80', 89' (pen.) |

Stade Taïeb Mhiri, Sfax
Referee: Rédouane Jiyed (Morocco)

13 September 2015
15:30 UTC+1

| AC Léopards (Republic of the Congo) | 0–0 | (Tunisia) CS Sfaxien |
|---|---|---|
| | Report |

Stade Denis Sassou Nguesso, Dolisie
Referee: Bernard Camille (Seychelles)
13 September 2015
20:30 UTC+2

| Zamalek (Egypt) | 4–1 | (South Africa) Orlando Pirates |
|---|---|---|
| Tawfik 13'; Mekky 36'; Fathi 62'; Kahraba 66' | Report | Manyisa 32' |

Petro Sport Stadium, Cairo
Referee: Hudu Munyemana (Rwanda)
