= 2015 CAF Confederation Cup =

International football competition in Africa

2015 Orange CAF Confederation Cup

Tournament details
- Dates: 13 February – 29 November 2015
- Teams: 55+8 (from 43 associations)

Final positions
- Champions: (Tunisia) Étoile du Sahel (2nd title)
- Runners-up: (South Africa) Orlando Pirates

Tournament statistics
- Matches played: 138
- Goals scored: 341 (2.47 per match)
- Top scorer(s): (Algeria) Baghdad Bounedjah (Gabon) Georges Ambourouet (South Africa) Thamsanqa Gabuza (6 goals each)

The 2015 CAF Confederation Cup (officially the 2015 Orange CAF Confederation Cup for sponsorship reasons) was the 12th edition of the CAF Confederation Cup, Africa's secondary club football competition organized by the Confederation of African Football (CAF). The winner earned the right to play in the 2016 CAF Super Cup.

Étoile du Sahel of Tunisia won the competition for the second time in their history after a 2–1 aggregate victory over Orlando Pirates of South Africa in the final. Al-Ahly were the defending champions, and after qualifying for the 2015 CAF Champions League, they entered the 2015 CAF Confederation Cup after they lost in the Champions League second round, but they were eliminated in the semi-finals.

== Association team allocation ==
All 56 CAF member associations may enter the CAF Confederation Cup, with the 12 highest ranked associations according to their CAF 5-year ranking eligible to enter two teams in the competition. The title holders can also enter if they have not qualified for the CAF Champions League. As a result, theoretically a maximum of 69 teams could enter the tournament (plus eight teams eliminated from the CAF Champions League which enter the play-off round) – although this level has never been reached.

For the 2015 CAF Confederation Cup, the CAF uses the 2009–2013 CAF 5-year ranking, which calculates points for each entrant association based on their clubs’ performance over those 5 years in the CAF Champions League and CAF Confederation Cup. The criteria for points are the following:

	CAF Champions League	CAF Confederation Cup
Winner	5 points	4 points
Runner-up	4 points	3 points
Losing semi-finalists	3 points	2 points
3rd place in groups	2 points	1 point
4th place in groups	1 point	1 point

The points are multiplied by a coefficient according to the year as follows:

- 2013 – 5
- 2012 – 4
- 2011 – 3
- 2010 – 2
- 2009 – 1

== Teams ==
The following 63 teams from 43 associations entered the competition.

Teams in bold received a bye to the first round. The other teams entered the preliminary round.

Associations are shown according to their 2009–2013 CAF 5-year ranking – those with a ranking score have their rank and score indicated.

Association	Team	Qualifying method
Associations eligible to enter two teams (Ranked 1–12)
Tunisia (1st – 106 pts)	**Étoile du Sahel**	2013–14 Tunisian Ligue Professionnelle 1 third place
Tunisia (1st – 106 pts)	**Club Africain**	2013–14 Tunisian Ligue Professionnelle 1 fourth place
Egypt (2nd – 80 pts)	**Zamalek**	2013–14 Egyptian Premier League third place
Egypt (2nd – 80 pts)	Petrojet	2013–14 Egyptian Premier League fourth place
(Democratic Republic of the Congo) DR Congo (3rd – 46 pts)	**AS Vita Club**	2013–14 Linafoot third place
(Democratic Republic of the Congo) DR Congo (3rd – 46 pts)	MK Étanchéité	2014 Coupe du Congo winner
Morocco (4th – 44 pts)	**FUS Rabat**	2013–14 Botola third place
Morocco (4th – 44 pts)	RS Berkane	2014 Coupe du Trône runner-up
Nigeria (5th – 41 pts)	Warri Wolves	2014 Nigeria Professional Football League third place
Nigeria (5th – 41 pts)	Dolphins	2014 Nigerian FA Cup runner-up
Sudan (6th – 37 pts)	**Al-Ahly Shendi**	2014 Sudan Premier League third place
Sudan (6th – 37 pts)	Al-Khartoum	2014 Sudan Premier League fourth place
Algeria (T-7th – 32 pts)	ASO Chlef	2013–14 Algerian Ligue Professionnelle 1 eighth place
Algeria (T-7th – 32 pts)	MC Alger	2013–14 Algerian Cup winner
Mali (T-7th – 32 pts)	Onze Créateurs	2014 Malian Cup winner
Mali (T-7th – 32 pts)	**Djoliba**	2014 Malian Cup runner-up
Cameroon (T-9th – 21 pts)	Unisport Bafang	2014 Elite One third place
Cameroon (T-9th – 21 pts)	Panthère du Ndé	2014 Cameroonian Cup runner-up
(Republic of the Congo) Congo (T-9th – 21 pts)	Étoile du Congo	2014 Congo Premier League fifth place before abandoned
(Republic of the Congo) Congo (T-9th – 21 pts)	CARA Brazzaville	2014 Coupe du Congo runner-up
(South Africa) South Africa (11th – 20 pts)	Bidvest Wits	2013–14 South African Premier Division third place
(South Africa) South Africa (11th – 20 pts)	**Orlando Pirates**	2013–14 Nedbank Cup winner
Angola (12th – 17 pts)	Benfica de Luanda	2014 Taça de Angola winner
Angola (12th – 17 pts)	Petro de Luanda	2014 Taça de Angola runner-up
Associations eligible to enter one team
(Ivory Coast) Ivory Coast (13th – 13 pts)	**ASEC Mimosas**	2014 Coupe de Côte d'Ivoire de football winner
Ghana (14th – 8 pts)	Hearts of Oak	2013–14 Ghanaian Premier League third place
Ethiopia (15th – 5 pts)	Dedebit	2014 Ethiopian Cup winner
Libya (T-16th – 4 pts)	Al-Ittihad	2013–14 Libyan Premier League runner-up
Zambia (T-16th – 4 pts)	Power Dynamos	2014 Zambian Premier League runner-up
Zimbabwe (18th – 3 pts)	FC Platinum	2014 Cup of Zimbabwe winner
Niger (19th – 2 pts)	Sahel SC	2014 Niger Cup winner
Benin	AS Police	2014 Benin Cup winner
Botswana	Botswana Defence Force	2013–14 Mascom Top 8 Cup winner
(Burkina Faso) Burkina Faso	RC Bobo	2014 Coupe du Faso winner
Burundi	Le Messager Ngozi	2014 Burundian Cup runner-up
Chad	Elect-Sport	2014 Coupe de Ligue de N'Djaména finalist
Comoros	Volcan Club	2014 Comoros Cup winner
(Equatorial Guinea) Equatorial Guinea	Leones Vegetarianos	2014 Equatoguinean Cup winner
Gabon	CF Mounana	2013–14 Gabon Championnat National D1 runner-up
Guinea	Horoya	2014 Guinée Coupe Nationale winner
Kenya	Sofapaka	2014 FKF President's Cup winner
Liberia	Fassell	2013–14 Liberian Cup winner
Madagascar	ASSM Elgeco Plus	2014 Coupe de Madagascar winner
Mauritius	Petite Rivière Noire	2014 Mauritian Cup winner
Mozambique	Ferroviário da Beira	2014 Taça de Moçambique winner
Rwanda	Rayon Sports	2013–14 Rwanda National Football League runner-up
Senegal	Olympique de Ngor	2014 Senegal FA Cup runner-up
Seychelles	Côte d'Or	2014 Seychelles FA Cup runner-up
(Sierra Leone) Sierra Leone	Kamboi Eagles	2014 Sierra Leonean FA Cup winner
(South Sudan) South Sudan	Al-Ghazal	2014 South Sudan National Cup runner-up
(Eswatini) Swaziland	Royal Leopards	2014 Swazi Cup winner
Tanzania	Young Africans	2013–14 Tanzanian Premier League runner-up
Togo	AS Togo-Port	2014 Togolese Championnat National runner-up
Uganda	URA	2013–14 Uganda Cup winner
Zanzibar	Polisi SC	2013–14 Zanzibar Premier League runner-up

Teams entering the play-off round
Losers of the 2015 CAF Champions League second round
(Guinea) AS Kaloum	(Democratic Republic of the Congo) SM Sanga Balende	(Tunisia) Espérance de Tunis	(Tunisia) CS Sfaxien
(Republic of the Congo) AC Léopards	(Egypt) Al-Ahly	(Morocco) Raja Casablanca	(Mali) Stade Malien

Associations which did not enter a team
- (Cape Verde) Cape Verde
- (Central African Republic) Central African Republic
- Djibouti
- Eritrea
- (The Gambia) Gambia
- Guinea-Bissau
- Lesotho
- Malawi
- Mauritania
- Namibia
- Réunion
- (São Tomé and Príncipe) São Tomé and Príncipe
- Somalia

== Schedule ==
The schedule of the competition was as follows (all draws are held at the CAF headquarters in Cairo, Egypt).

Phase	Round	Draw date	First leg	Second leg
Qualifying	Preliminary round	22 December 2014	13–15 February 2015	27 February–1 March 2015
Qualifying	First round	22 December 2014	13–15 March 2015	3–5 April 2015
Qualifying	Second round	22 December 2014	17–19 April 2015	1–3 May 2015
Qualifying	Play-off round	5 May 2015	15–17 May 2015	5–7 June 2015
Group stage	Matchday 1	5 May 2015	26–28 June 2015	
Group stage	Matchday 2	5 May 2015	10–12 July 2015	
Group stage	Matchday 3	5 May 2015	24–26 July 2015	
Group stage	Matchday 4	5 May 2015	7–9 August 2015	
Group stage	Matchday 5	5 May 2015	21–23 August 2015	
Group stage	Matchday 6	5 May 2015	11–13 September 2015	
Knockout stage	Semi-finals	5 May 2015	25–27 September 2015	2–4 October 2015
Knockout stage	Final	5 May 2015	20–22 November 2015	27–29 November 2015

== Qualifying rounds ==
The draw for the preliminary, first and second qualifying rounds was held on 22 December 2014.

Qualification ties were played on a home-and-away two-legged basis. If the aggregate score was tied after the second leg, the away goals rule would be applied, and if still level, the penalty shoot-out would be used to determine the winner (no extra time would be played).

=== Preliminary round ===
Team 1	Agg.	Team 2	1st leg	2nd leg
MC Alger (Algeria)	0–2	(Niger) Sahel SC	0–0	0–2
RS Berkane (Morocco)	2–2 (a)	(Mali) Onze Créateurs	2–1	0–1
Al-Ittihad (Libya)	7–1	(Chad) Elect-Sport	6–1	1–0
Al-Ghazal (South Sudan)	1–7	(Egypt) Petrojet	0–1	1–6
Unisport Bafang (Cameroon)	2–3	(Senegal) Olympique de Ngor	1–0	1–3
Hearts of Oak (Ghana)	1–0	(Benin) AS Police	1–0	0–0
ASO Chlef (Algeria)	2–1	(Sierra Leone) Kamboi Eagles	2–0	0–1
Horoya (Guinea)	4–3	(Liberia) Fassell	1–0	3–3
Leones Vegetarianos (Equatorial Guinea)	1–1 (3–5 p)	(Nigeria) Dolphins	1–0	0–1
Côte d'Or (Seychelles)	2–5	(Ethiopia) Dedebit	2–3	0–2
RC Bobo (Burkina Faso)	0–4	(Nigeria) Warri Wolves	0–1	0–3
Étoile du Congo (Republic of the Congo)	2–3	(Democratic Republic of the Congo) MK Étanchéité	1–2	1–1
Panthère du Ndé (Cameroon)	0–2	(Rwanda) Rayon Sports	0–1	0–1
AS Togo-Port	5–3	(Republic of the Congo) CARA Brazzaville	2–0	3–3
Al-Khartoum (Sudan)	1–2	(Zambia) Power Dynamos	1–0	0–2
CF Mounana (Gabon)	8–1	(Zanzibar) Polisi	5–0	3–1
URA (Uganda)	4–2	(Madagascar) ASSM Elgeco Plus	3–2	1–0
Sofapaka (Kenya)	2–4	(Zimbabwe) FC Platinum	1–2	1–2
Young Africans (Tanzania)	3–2	Botswana Defence Force	2–0	1–2
Benfica de Luanda (Angola)	3–0	(Burundi) Le Messager Ngozi	2–0	1–0
Volcan Club (Comoros)	0–5	(Angola) Petro de Luanda	0–1	0–4
Bidvest Wits (South Africa)	3–3 (6–7 p)	(Eswatini) Royal Leopards	3–0	0–3
Petite Rivière Noire (Mauritius)	3–7	(Mozambique) Ferroviário da Beira	1–2	2–5

=== First round ===
Team 1	Agg.	Team 2	1st leg	2nd leg
Onze Créateurs (Mali)	2–1	(Niger) Sahel SC	2–1	0–0
ASEC Mimosas (Ivory Coast)	3–2	(Libya) Al-Ittihad	1–1	2–1
Djoliba (Mali)	2–1	(Egypt) Petrojet	2–1	0–0
Hearts of Oak (Ghana)	5–3	(Senegal) Olympique de Ngor	2–1	3–2
Horoya (Guinea)	1–1 (3–5 p)	(Algeria) ASO Chlef	1–0	0–1
Club Africain (Tunisia)	w/o	(Nigeria) Dolphins	—	—
Warri Wolves (Nigeria)	2–0	(Ethiopia) Dedebit	2–0	0–0
Al-Ahly Shendi (Sudan)	3–6	(Democratic Republic of the Congo) MK Étanchéité	2–1	1–5
Zamalek (Egypt)	6–1	(Rwanda) Rayon Sports	3–1	3–0
FUS Rabat (Morocco)	4–2	AS Togo-Port	3–0	1–2
CF Mounana (Gabon)	4–3	(Zambia) Power Dynamos	4–0	0–3
Orlando Pirates (South Africa)	4–3	(Uganda) URA	2–1	2–2
Young Africans (Tanzania)	5–2	(Zimbabwe) FC Platinum	5–1	0–1
Étoile du Sahel (Tunisia)	2–1	(Angola) Benfica de Luanda	1–0	1–1
Royal Leopards (Eswatini)	3–2	(Angola) Petro de Luanda	2–2	1–0
AS Vita Club (Democratic Republic of the Congo)	3–1	(Mozambique) Ferroviário da Beira	3–0	0–1

Notes

1. Club Africain won on walkover after Dolphins did not arrive on time for the first leg.

=== Second round ===
Team 1	Agg.	Team 2	1st leg	2nd leg
Onze Créateurs (Mali)	0–3	(Ivory Coast) ASEC Mimosas	0–1	0–2
Djoliba (Mali)	2–2 (a)	(Ghana) Hearts of Oak	1–2	1–0
ASO Chlef (Algeria)	1–2	(Tunisia) Club Africain	1–1	0–1
Warri Wolves (Nigeria)	3–1	(Democratic Republic of the Congo) MK Étanchéité	2–1	1–0
Zamalek (Egypt)	3–2	(Morocco) FUS Rabat	0–0	3–2
CF Mounana (Gabon)	2–5	(South Africa) Orlando Pirates	2–2	0–3
Young Africans (Tanzania)	1–2	(Tunisia) Étoile du Sahel	1–1	0–1
Royal Leopards (Eswatini)	2–4	(Democratic Republic of the Congo) AS Vita Club	1–0	1–4

=== Play-off round ===
The draw for the play-off round was held on 5 May 2015. The winners of the Confederation Cup second round were drawn against the losers of the Champions League second round, with the former hosting the second leg.

Team 1	Agg.	Team 2	1st leg	2nd leg
Al-Ahly (Egypt)	3–3 (5–4 p)	(Tunisia) Club Africain	2–1	1–2
Espérance de Tunis (Tunisia)	5–1	(Ghana) Hearts of Oak	4–0	1–1
AC Léopards (Republic of the Congo)	4–3	(Nigeria) Warri Wolves	3–0	1–3
CS Sfaxien (Tunisia)	3–1	(Ivory Coast) ASEC Mimosas	2–0	1–1
Stade Malien (Mali)	4–3	(Democratic Republic of the Congo) AS Vita Club	2–0	2–3
AS Kaloum (Guinea)	1–6	(South Africa) Orlando Pirates	0–2	1–4
SM Sanga Balende (Democratic Republic of the Congo)	2–3	(Egypt) Zamalek	1–0	1–3
Raja Casablanca (Morocco)	2–3	(Tunisia) Étoile du Sahel	2–0	0–3

== Group stage ==
Location of teams of the 2015 CAF Confederation Cup group stage.
Group A.
Group B.

The draw for the group stage was held on 5 May 2015. The eight teams were drawn into two groups of four. Each group was played on a home-and-away round-robin basis. The winners and runners-up of each group advanced to the semi-finals.

Tiebreakers

The teams were ranked according to points (3 points for a win, 1 point for a draw, 0 points for a loss). If tied on points, tiebreakers would be applied in the following order:

1. Number of points obtained in games between the teams concerned;
2. Goal difference in games between the teams concerned;
3. Goals scored in games between the teams concerned;
4. Away goals scored in games between the teams concerned;
5. If, after applying criteria 1 to 4 to several teams, two teams still have an equal ranking, criteria 1 to 4 are reapplied exclusively to the matches between the two teams in question to determine their final rankings. If this procedure does not lead to a decision, criteria 6 to 9 apply;
6. Goal difference in all games;
7. Goals scored in all games;
8. Away goals scored in all games;
9. Drawing of lots.

=== Group A ===
Pos	Team	Pld	W	D	L	GF	GA	GD	Pts	Qualification	AHL	ESS	STA	EST
1	(Egypt) Al-Ahly	6	4	1	1	6	1	+5	13	Advance to knockout stage	—	1–0	1–0	3–0
2	(Tunisia) Étoile du Sahel	6	4	1	1	6	3	+3	13	Advance to knockout stage	1–0	—	1–0	2–1
3	(Mali) Stade Malien	6	1	2	3	3	5	−2	5		0–0	1–1	—	0–1
4	(Tunisia) Espérance de Tunis	6	1	0	5	3	9	−6	3		0–1	0–1	1–2	—

Source: CAF

=== Group B ===
Pos	Team	Pld	W	D	L	GF	GA	GD	Pts	Qualification	ZAM	ORL	LEO	CSS
1	(Egypt) Zamalek	6	5	0	1	12	4	+8	15	Advance to knockout stage	—	4–1	2–0	1–0
2	(South Africa) Orlando Pirates	6	4	0	2	8	6	+2	12	Advance to knockout stage	1–2	—	2–0	2–0
3	(Republic of the Congo) AC Léopards	6	1	2	3	2	6	−4	5		1–0	0–1	—	0–0
4	(Tunisia) CS Sfaxien	6	0	2	4	2	8	−6	2		1–3	0–1	1–1	—

Source: CAF

== Knockout stage ==
Knockout ties were played on a home-and-away two-legged basis. If the aggregate score was tied after the second leg, the away goals rule would be applied, and if still level, the penalty shoot-out would be used to determine the winner (no extra time would be played).

=== Bracket ===
Semi-finals
1	(South Africa) Orlando Pirates	1	4	5
4	(Egypt) Al-Ahly	0	3	3
3	(Tunisia) Étoile du Sahel	5	0	5
2	(Egypt) Zamalek	1	3	4

Final
(South Africa) Orlando Pirates	1	0	1
(Tunisia) Étoile du Sahel	1	1	2

=== Semi-finals ===
In the semi-finals, the group A winners played the group B runners-up, and the group B winners played the group A runners-up, with the group winners hosting the second leg.

Team 1	Agg.	Team 2	1st leg	2nd leg
Orlando Pirates (South Africa)	5–3	(Egypt) Al-Ahly	1–0	4–3
Étoile du Sahel (Tunisia)	5–4	(Egypt) Zamalek	5–1	0–3

=== Final ===
In the final, the order of legs was determined by a draw, held after the group stage draw.

21 November 2015
20:00 UTC+2

Orlando Pirates (South Africa)	1–1	(Tunisia) Étoile du Sahel
Gabuza 36'	Report	Jemal 87'

Orlando Stadium, Johannesburg
Referee: Janny Sikazwe (Zambia)
29 November 2015
15:00 UTC+1

Étoile du Sahel (Tunisia)	1–0	(South Africa) Orlando Pirates
Jemal 24'	Report

Stade Olympique de Sousse, Sousse
Referee: Néant Alioum (Cameroon)

Étoile du Sahel won 2–1 on aggregate.

== Top scorers ==
Rank	Player	Team	Goals
1	(Gabon) Georges Ambourouet	(Gabon) CF Mounana	6
1	(South Africa) Thamsanqa Gabuza	(South Africa) Orlando Pirates	6
1	(Algeria) Baghdad Bounedjah	(Tunisia) Étoile du Sahel	6
4	(Democratic Republic of the Congo) Firmin Ndombe Mubele	(Democratic Republic of the Congo) AS Vita Club	5
4	(Nigeria) Gbolahan Salami	(Nigeria) Warri Wolves	5
4	(South Africa) Kermit Erasmus	(South Africa) Orlando Pirates	5
4	(Tunisia) Ammar Jemal	(Tunisia) Étoile du Sahel	5
8	(Democratic Republic of the Congo) Kadima Kabangu	(Democratic Republic of the Congo) MK Étanchéité	4
8	(Egypt) Kahraba	(Egypt) Zamalek	4
8	(South Africa) Oupa Manyisa	(South Africa) Orlando Pirates	4
8	(South Africa) Thabo Rakhale	(South Africa) Orlando Pirates	4

== See also ==
- 2015 CAF Champions League
- 2016 CAF Super Cup
