= Tunisian football clubs in African competitions =

CAF trophies display at the ES Sahel headquarters

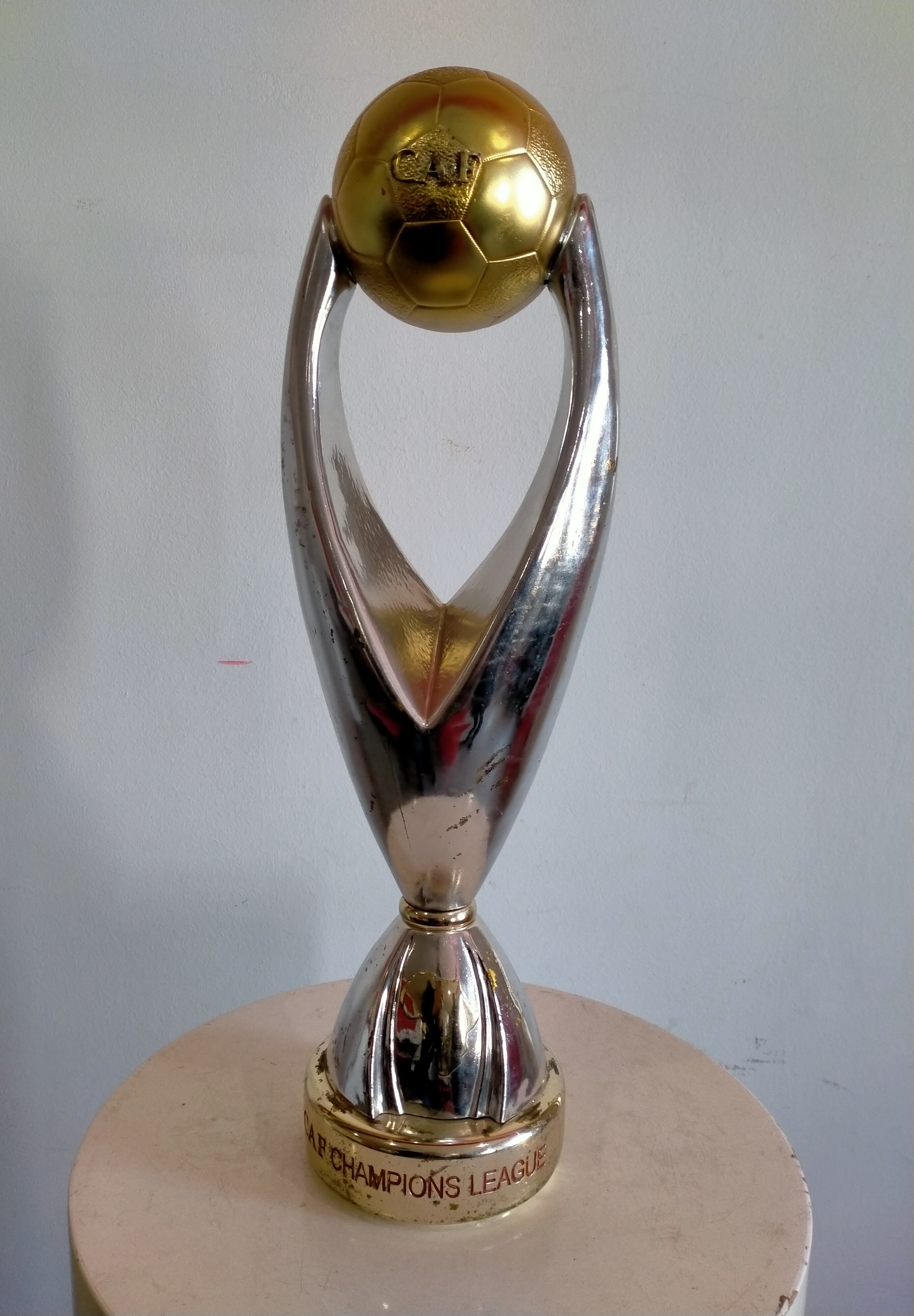
CAF Champions League

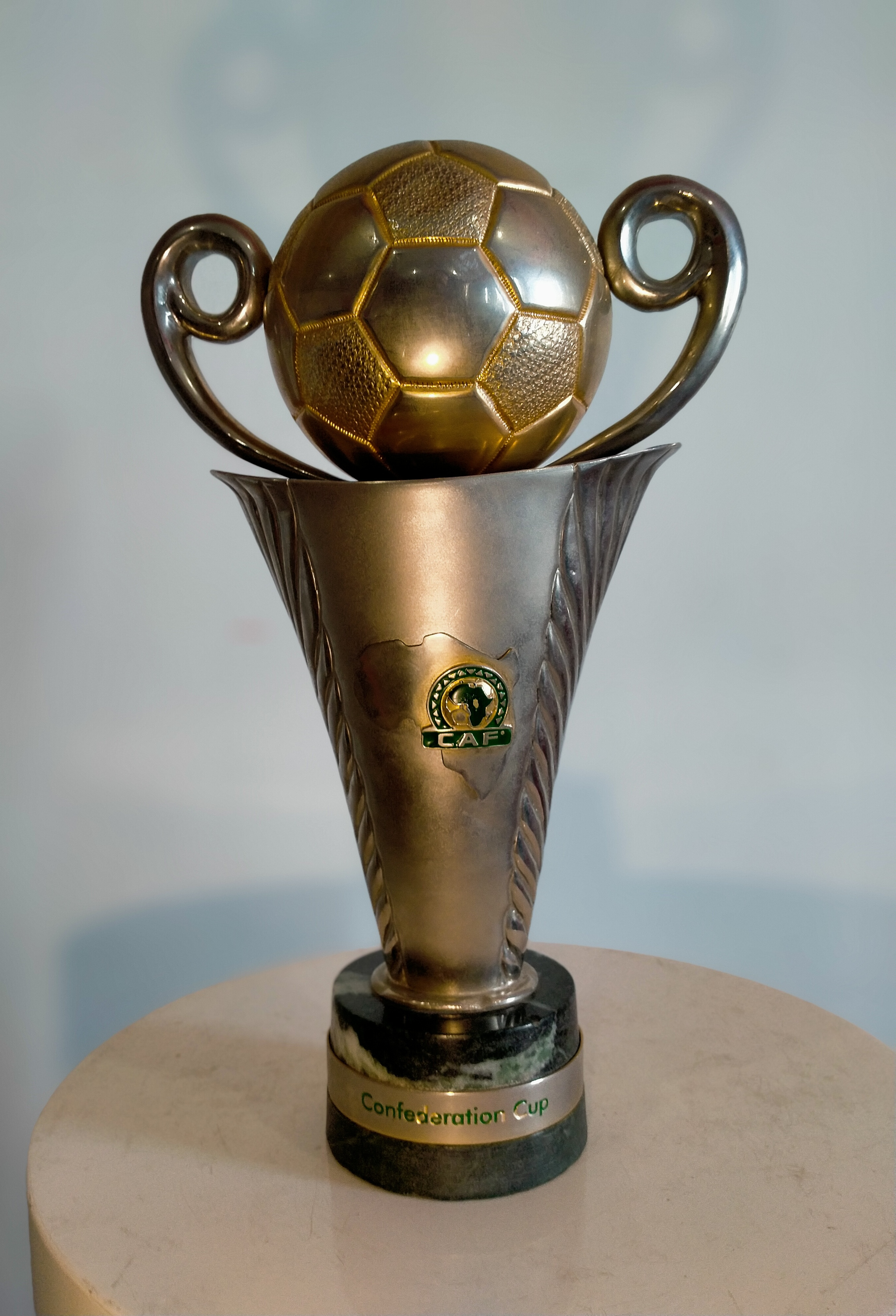
CAF Confederation Cup

This article presents the participation of Tunisian clubs in African and international football competitions. The Tunisian teams are among the best African teams with a total of 24 titles. 12 Tunisian teams in total played in African competitions.

Étoile Sportive du Sahel is the Tunisian club that has won the most African Cups with 9 titles, followed by Espérance Sportive de Tunis with 8 titles. Tunisian clubs also have a share in the FIFA Club World Cup with four participations, three for Esperance in 2011, 2018, 2019 thanks to winning the African Champions League title in 2011, 2018, 2019 and the only participation of Etoile du Sahel in 2007, which at the time ranked fourth as the best result for Tunisian teams in the Club World Cup.

As African Cup of Champions Clubs / CAF Champions League, Tunisian clubs occupy a huge position in the competition. Espérance Sportive de Tunis is the most Tunisian club participating in the competition with 23 times. It reached the final eight times and was crowned four times in 1994, 2011, 2018, and 2019.

As for Étoile Sportive du Sahel, he participated 12 times and reached the final 3 times and was crowned once in 2007, and finally Club Africain participated 10 times and crowned it in its first final in 1991, and CS Sfaxien was satisfied with second place in 2006 with four participations.

As CAF Confederation Cup, Tunisian clubs are the most crowned champions in the history of this competition with 5 championships. CS Sfaxien is the most crowned African Confederation Cup with three titles in 2007, 2008, and 2013, followed by Étoile Sportive du Sahel with two titles crowned in 2006 and 2015.

But misfortune always follows the Tunisian teams in CAF Super Cup, as they participated 13 times and were crowned only three times. Etoile Sportive de Sahel won it in 1998 and 2003 and was satisfied with the runners-up in 2004, 2007 and 2016. As for the Tunisian Esperance Sportive, it participated 5 times and won it once in 1995, and was satisfied with the runner-up in 1999, 2012, 2019 and 2020. As for CS Sfaxien, it participated three times in 2007, 2008 and 2014, one of which was against Etoile Sportive du Sahel in 2008.

== Overview ==
=== African Cup of Champions Clubs / CAF Champions League ===
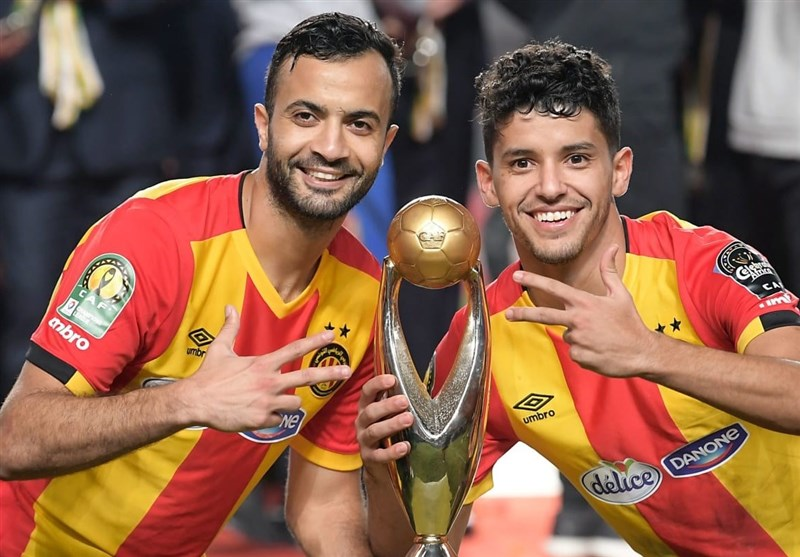
Espérance Sportive de Tunis, CAF Champions League Champions in 2018

Tunisian clubs won the African Champions League title with six titles and were satisfied with the runners-up on seven occasions. The Tunisian clubs are the second country to crown their teams with the African Champions League title after the Egyptian clubs crowned with fourteen titles.

Esperance Sportive de Tunis is the team that has won the most African Champions League title at the Tunisian level with four titles in 1994, 2011, 2018 and 2018–19 in twenty-five participation. 2010, 2011 and 2012 and played the final twice in a row also in 2018 and 2019. As for Club Africain, it is the first Tunisian club to win this tournament, which was called the African Cup of Champions Clubs in 1991, in ten participations.

As for the coastal sports star, he participated in the tournament in thirteen occasions, and reached the finals in 2004, 2005 and 2007. He won the title in 2007 against Al-Ahly Club of Egypt and was satisfied with the runners-up in 2004 and 2005. The Sports Club of Sfaxien came second in 2006 in four participations.

==== African Cup of Champions Clubs ====
PR : Preliminary round, R1 : First round, R2 : Second round, R3 : Third round, QF : Quarter-finals, SF : Semi-finals, RU : Runners-up, W : Winners.

Team	1971	1985	1986	1987	1988	1989	1990	1991	1992	1993	1994	1995	1996
ES Tunis	R2	–	QF	–	–	R2	QF	–	R1	–	W	QF	–
Club Africain	–	–	–	–	–	–	–	W	QF	R2	–	–	–
ES Sahel	–	–	–	R2	R2	–	–	–	–	–	–	–	–
CA Bizertin	–	R2	–	–	–	–	–	–	–	–	–	–	–
CS Sfaxien	–	–	–	–	–	–	–	–	–	–	–	–	SF

==== CAF Champions League ====
PR : Preliminary round, R1 : First round, R2 : Second round, R3 : Third round, QF : Quarter-finals, SF : Semi-finals, RU : Runners-up, W : Winners.

Team	1997	1998	1999	2001	2002	2003	2004	2005	2006	2007	2008	2009	2010	2011	2012
ES Tunis	–	RU	RU	SF	GS	SF	SF	GS	–	GS	–	–	RU	W	RU
ES Sahel	–	–	–	–	–	–	RU	RU	R2	W	R2	GS	–	–	GS
Club Africain	GS	–	–	–	–	–	–	–	–	–	R2	R1	R1	R2	–
CS Sfaxien	–	–	–	–	–	–	–	–	RU	–	–	–	–	–	–

Team	2013	2014	2015	2016	2017	2018	2019	2020	2021	2022	2023	2024	2025	2026
ES Tunis	SF	GS	R2	–	QF	W	W	QF	SF	QF	SF	RU	QF	SF
ES Sahel	–	–	–	R2	SF	QF	–	QF	–	GS	–	GS	–	–
Club Africain	–	–	–	R1	–	–	GS	–	–	–	–	–	–	–
CS Sfaxien	–	SF	R2	–	–	–	–	–	R1	–	–	–	–	–
CA Bizertin	R2	–	–	–	–	–	–	–	–	–	–	–	–	–
US Monastir	–	–	–	–	–	–	–	–	–	–	R2	–	R2	R2

=== CAF Confederation Cup ===
PR : Preliminary round, R1 : First round, R2 : Second round, R3 : Third round, QF : Quarter-finals, SF : Semi-finals, RU : Runners-up, W : Winners.

Team	2004	2005	2006	2007	2008	2009	2010	2011	2012	2013	2014	2015	2016	2017	2018	2019	2020	2021	2022	2023	2024	2025	2026
CS Sfaxien	–	–	–	W	W	R2	RU	–	R1	W	–	GS	–	QF	–	SF	–	QF	GS	R3	–	GS	–
ES Sahel	–	–	W	–	RU	–	R1	R2	–	GS	GS	W	SF	–	–	SF	–	–	–	–	–	–	R2
Club Africain	R2	–	–	–	GS	–	–	RU	PR	–	–	–	–	SF	R1	–	–	–	–	–	GS	–	–
ES Tunis	–	–	GS	–	R2	–	–	–	–	–	–	GS	PR	–	–	–	–	–	–	–	–	–	–
CA Bizertin	–	–	–	–	–	–	–	–	–	SF	PR	–	–	–	–	–	–	–	–	–	–	–	–
Stade Tunisien	R2	–	–	–	–	R1	–	–	–	–	–	–	–	–	–	–	–	–	–	–	–	R2	R2
EGS Gafsa	–	–	–	R2	–	R2	–	–	–	–	–	–	–	–	–	–	–	–	–	–	–	–	–
AS Marsa	–	GS	–	–	–	–	–	–	–	–	–	–	–	–	–	–	–	–	–	–	–	–	–
Stade Gabèsien	–	–	–	–	–	–	–	–	–	–	–	–	PR	–	–	–	–	–	–	–	–	–	–
JS Kairouan	–	R1	–	–	–	–	–	–	–	–	–	–	–	–	–	–	–	–	–	–	R1	–	–
Olympique Béja	–	–	–	–	–	–	–	R1	–	–	–	–	–	–	–	–	–	–	–	–	–	–	–
US Ben Guerdane	–	–	–	–	–	–	–	–	–	–	–	–	–	–	R1	R2	R1	–	R2	R3	–	–	–
US Monastir	–	–	–	–	–	–	–	–	–	–	–	–	–	–	–	–	–	PR	–	QF	–	–	–

=== CAF Super Cup ===
PR : Preliminary round, R1 : First round, R2 : Second round, R3 : Third round, QF : Quarter-finals, SF : Semi-finals, RU : Runners-up, W : Winners.

Team	1995	1998	1999	2004	2007	2008	2009	2012	2014	2016	2019	2020
ES Sahel	–	W	–	RU	RU	W	–	–	–	RU	–	–
ES Tunis	W	–	RU	–	–	–	–	RU	–	–	RU	RU
CS Sfaxien	–	–	–	–	–	RU	RU	–	RU	–	–	–

=== CAF Cup ===
PR : Preliminary round, R1 : First round, R2 : Second round, R3 : Third round, QF : Quarter-finals, SF : Semi-finals, RU : Runners-up, W : Winners.

Team	1992	1994	1995	1996	1997	1998	1999	2000	2001	2002	2003
ES Sahel	–	–	W	RU	–	–	W	QF	RU	QF	–
CS Sfaxien	–	–	–	–	–	W	QF	–	–	–	–
CA Bizertin	SF	–	–	–	–	–	–	R2	–	–	–
ES Tunis	–	–	–	–	W	–	–	–	–	–	–
Club Africain	–	–	–	–	–	–	–	–	–	–	SF
JS Kairouan	–	QF	–	–	–	–	–	–	–	–	–

=== African Cup Winners' Cup ===
PR : Preliminary round, R1 : First round, R2 : Second round, R3 : Third round, QF : Quarter-finals, SF : Semi-finals, RU : Runners-up, W : Winners.

Team	1980	1981	1984	1985	1986	1987	1988	1989	1990	1991	1992
ES Tunis	R2	R1	–	–	–	RU	–	–	–	–	–
ES Sahel	–	–	R1	–	–	–	–	–	–	–	R1
Club Africain	–	–	–	–	–	–	–	–	RU	–	–
AS Marsa	–	–	–	R1	–	–	–	–	–	R2	–
CS Hammam-Lif	–	–	–	–	SF	–	–	–	–	–	–
CA Bizertin	–	–	–	–	–	–	W	R2	–	–	–
CO Transports	–	–	–	–	–	–	–	R1	–	–	–
Team	1993	1994	1995	1996	1997	1998	1999	2000	2001	2002	2003
ES Tunis	–	–	–	–	–	W	–	–	–	–	–
ES Sahel	–	–	–	–	W	–	–	–	–	–	W
Club Africain	–	–	–	–	–	–	RU	R2	SF	–	–
AS Marsa	–	–	QF	–	–	–	–	–	–	–	–
CS Hammam-Lif	–	–	–	–	–	–	–	–	–	R2	–
Olympique Béja	–	QF	–	R2	–	–	–	–	–	–	–
Stade Tunisien	QF	–	–	–	–	–	–	–	–	–	–
