= Brighton Mhlongo =

South African footballer

Personal information
- Date of birth: 12 January 1991 (age 35)
- Place of birth: Soweto, South Africa
- Height: 1.87 m (6 ft 2 in)
- Position: Goalkeeper

Youth career
- Balfour Park
- Orlando Pirates
- Garankuwa United

Senior career*
Years	Team	Apps	(Gls)
2010–2011	FC AK		
2011–2017	Orlando Pirates	55	(0)
2017–2020	Chippa United	8	(0)
2020–	Bidvest Wits F.C.	1	(0)
2020–2021	TTM	2	(0)
2021	Marumo Gallants	0	(0)

International career
2016	South Africa	1	(0)
- * Club domestic league appearances and goals

Brighton Mhlongo (born 12 January 1991) is a South African footballer who played as a goalkeeper for several Premier Soccer League clubs.

He played several years for the Orlando Pirates, but the club eventually wanted to offload the player. He joined Bidvest Wits, but scarcely played. He followed over to Tshakhuma Tsha Madzivhandila after its owner bought Bidvest Wits' licence, doing the same when TTM sold to Marumo Gallants in 2021.

In 2021, he was hit point-blank in the eye by a football shot, rendering him partially blind. Controversially, Marumo Gallants promptly terminiated his contract.

== International career ==
Mhlongo was called up to the senior South Africa squad for the 2017 Africa Cup of Nations qualifier against Gambia in June 2016. He made his national team debut on the friendly match against Ghana on 11 October 2016.

== Personal life ==
Mhlongo married on Good Friday 2016. The day before, he was caught speeding.

He later admitted to having struggled with alcoholism since the mid-2010s.
