= Mehdi Saâda =

Tunisian footballer

Personal information
- Date of birth: 24 June 1987 (age 39)
- Position: Midfielder

Senior career*
Years	Team	Apps	(Gls)
2011	CS Hammam-Lif		
2012–2014	US Monastir		
2014–2016	Étoile du Sahel		
2016–2018	AS Gabès		
- * Club domestic league appearances and goals

Mehdi Saâda (born 24 June 1987) is a retired Tunisian football midfielder.
