= Ayanda Gcaba =

South African soccer player

Personal information
- Full name: Ayanda Oscar Gcaba
- Date of birth: 8 March 1986 (age 40)
- Place of birth: Port Shepstone, South Africa
- Height: 1.86 m (6 ft 1 in)
- Position: Centre back

Team information
- Current team: Sinenkani

Youth career
- Barberton City Stars

Senior career*
Years	Team	Apps	(Gls)
2008–2012	Free State Stars	65	(2)
2012–2018	Orlando Pirates	87	(6)
2018	→ Platinum Stars (loan)	7	(0)
2019–2020	Royal Eagles	13	(0)
2020–2021	Jomo Cosmos	19	(0)
2022–	Sinenkani		

International career^{‡}
2012–2015	South Africa	2	(0)
- * Club domestic league appearances and goals as of 15 November 2022 ‡ National team caps and goals as of 15 November 2022

Ayanda Gcaba (born 8 March 1986) is a South African international footballer who plays for Sinenkani, as a defender.

== Club career ==
Born in Port Shepstone, Gcaba began his career with Barberton City Stars, before playing professionally with Free State Stars, Orlando Pirates, Platinum Stars, Royal Eagles and Jomo Cosmos.

In December 2017 he stated he wanted to leave Orlando Pirates. He moved to Platinum Stars on loan in January 2018.

He joined Royal Eagles in September 2019, before leaving the club in January 2020 amongst rumours that he had been fired by the club after driving the team bus, which he denied.

He began training with Jomo Cosmos in October 2020, signing with the club in November 2020. He moved to Sinenkani in 2022.

== International career ==
He made his international debut for South Africa in 2012.
