= Mohammad Mothnani =

Tunisian footballer

Mohamed Methnani
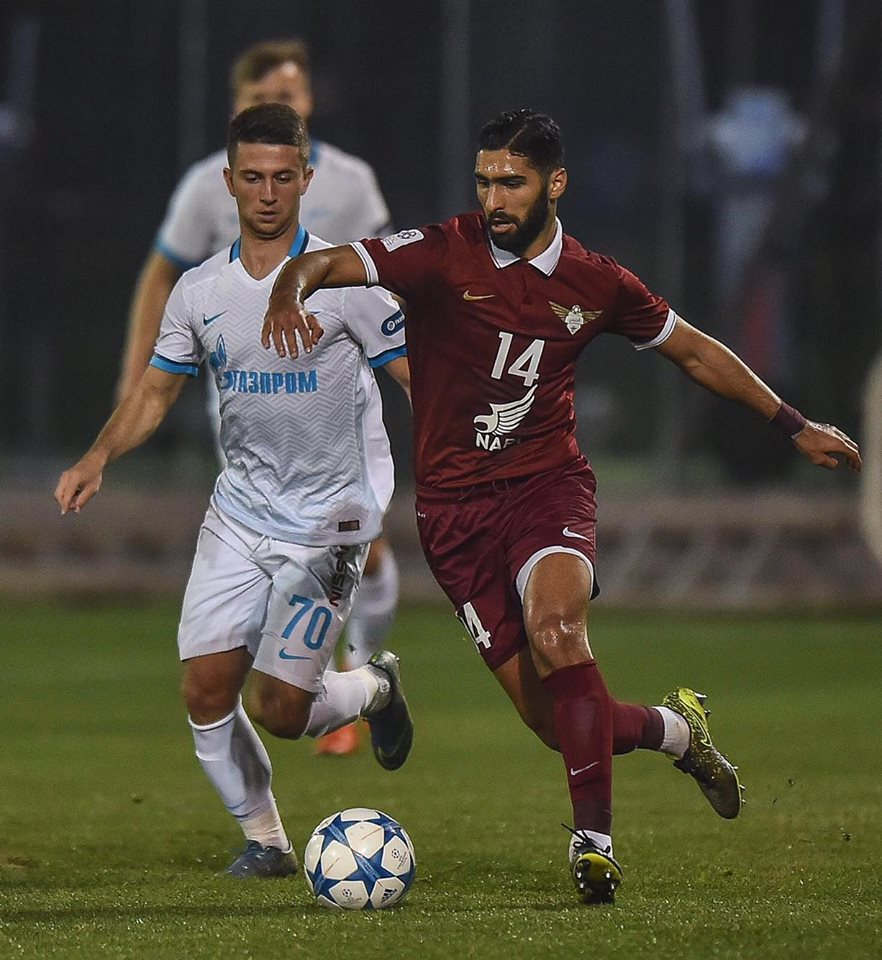

Personal information
- Full name: Mohamed Abdullah Methnani
- Date of birth: March 3, 1992 (age 34)
- Place of birth: Le Bardo, Tunisia
- Height: 1.83 m (6 ft 0 in)
- Position: Midfielder

Team information
- Current team: Al Bidda
- Number: 13

Youth career
- 2002–2008: Espérance Tunis
- 2008–2011: Club Africain

Senior career*
Years	Team	Apps	(Gls)
2011–2017	El Jaish	96	(12)
2017–2018	Al-Qadsiah	10	(0)
2018–2020	Étoile Sahel	27	(0)
2020–2021	National Bank	20	(0)
2021–2022	Al-Ahli		
2023–2024	Hammam Sousse	11	(1)
2024	Mesaimeer	0	(0)
2024–2025	Al-Salliya	9	(1)
2025–	Al Bidda	2	(0)
- * Club domestic league appearances and goals as of 30 May 2016

Mohamed Methnani (born March 3, 1992, in Le Bardo) is a Tunisian football player. He currently plays for Al Bidda as a midfielder.

== Club career ==
Methnani began his career in 2002 in the junior ranks of Espérance Tunis, where he spent 6 seasons. He then joined cross town rivals Club Africain. In 2011, the club offered a five-year professional contract but he turned it down due to its length. Instead, he joined Qatari club El Jaish, with the club playing a 30,000 Tunisian dinars transfer fee.
