= Zied Jebali =

Tunisian footballer

Personal information
- Full name: Mohamed Zied Jebali
- Date of birth: 28 June 1990 (age 36)
- Place of birth: Tunis, Tunisia
- Height: 1.96 m (6 ft 5 in)
- Position: Goalkeeper

Senior career*
Years	Team	Apps	(Gls)
2011–2015	AS Marsa	74	(0)
2015–2020	Étoile du Sahel	18	(0)
2018–2019	→ AS Gabès (loan)	2	(0)
2020–2021	AS Rejiche	10	(0)
2021–2022	Olympique Béja		
2022–2024	AS Marsa		
2024–2025	Al-Ghottah		
Medal record
AS Marsa
Winner	Tunisian Cup	2014–15
Étoile du Sahel
Winner	Ligue Professionnelle 1	2015–16
Runner-up	Ligue Professionnelle 1	2016–17
Runner-up	Ligue Professionnelle 1	2017–18
Runner-up	Tunisian Cup	2017–18
- * Club domestic league appearances and goals as of 11:00, 18 July 2018 (UTC) ‡ National team caps and goals as of 11:00, 18 July 2018 (UTC)

Zied Jebali (Arabic: زياد الجبالي; born 28 June 1990) is a Tunisian football player.

== Career statistics ==
=== Club ===
As of 18 July 2018.

Club	Season	League			Cup		Continental		Other		Total	
Club	Season	Division	Apps	Goals	Apps	Goals	Apps	Goals	Apps	Goals	Apps	Goals
AS Marsa	2011–12	Ligue Professionnelle 1	27	0	0	0	–		0	0	27	0
AS Marsa	2012–13	Ligue Professionnelle 1	13	0	0	0	–		0	0	13	0
AS Marsa	2013–14	Ligue Professionnelle 1	19	0	0	0	–		0	0	19	0
AS Marsa	2014–15	Ligue Professionnelle 1	15	0	0	0	–		0	0	15	0
AS Marsa	Total		74	0	0	0	0	0	0	0	74	0
Étoile du Sahel	2015–16	Ligue Professionnelle 1	10	0	0	0	4 (Note: Appearances in the CAF Confederation Cup)	0	0	0	14	0
Étoile du Sahel	2016–17	Ligue Professionnelle 1	5	0	0	0	0	0	0	0	5	0
Étoile du Sahel	2017–18	Ligue Professionnelle 1	3	0	3 (Note: Appearances in the Tunisian Cup)	0	0	0	0	0	6	0
Étoile du Sahel	Total		18	0	3	0	4	0	0	0	25	0
Career total			92	0	3	0	4	0	0	0	99	0
