= Franck Kom =

Cameroonian footballer (born 1991)

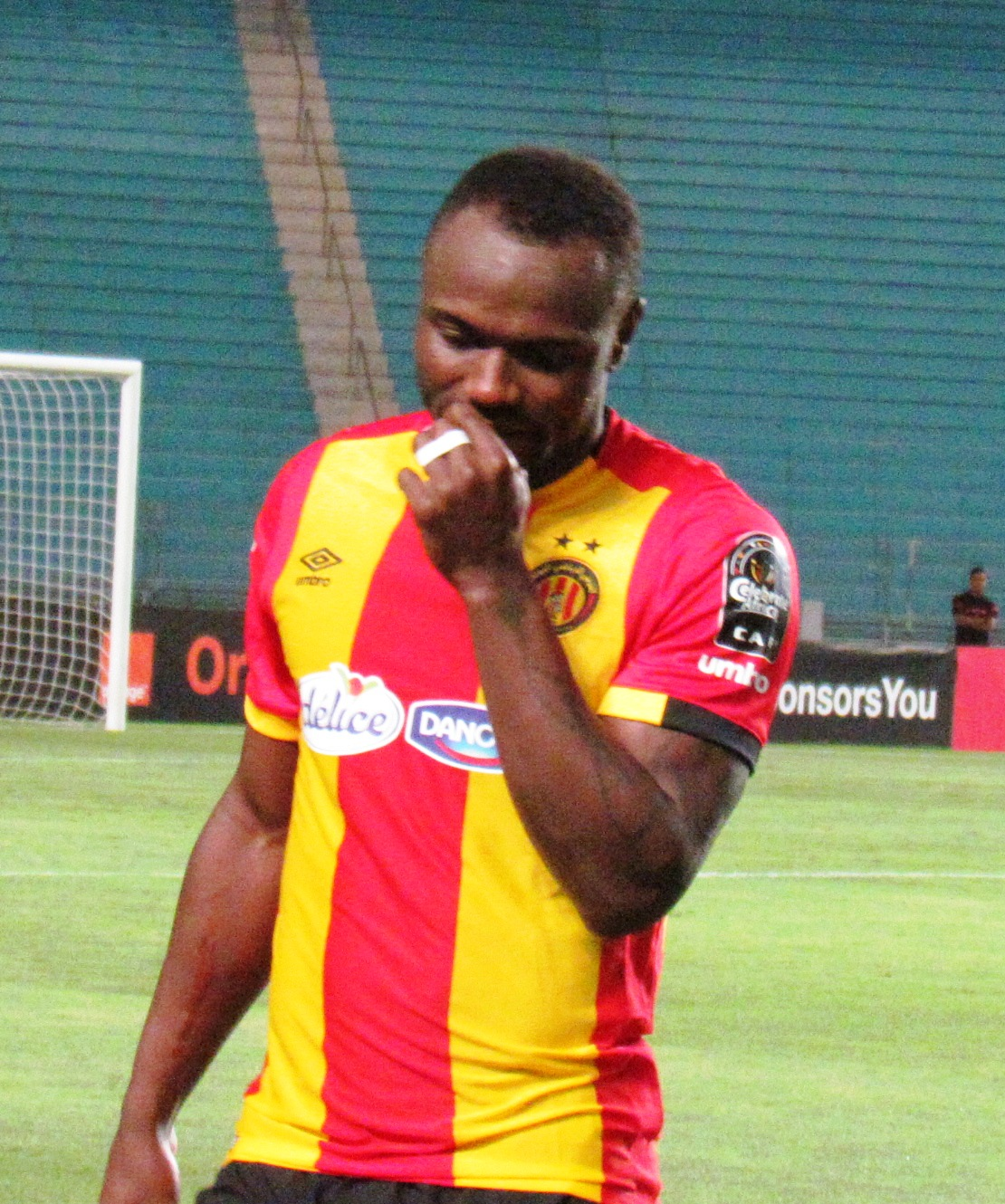
- Kom with Espérance Tunis in 2018

Personal information
- Full name: Franck Kom
- Date of birth: 18 September 1991 (age 35)
- Place of birth: Douala, Cameroon
- Height: 1.77 m (5 ft 10 in)
- Position: Defensive midfielder

Senior career*
Years	Team	Apps	(Gls)
2009–2011	Panthère du Ndé		
2011–2016	Étoile du Sahel	96	(3)
2016–2017	Karlsruher SC	21	(0)
2017–2019	Espérance Tunis	40	(2)
2019–2022	Al-Rayyan	45	(6)
2021	→ Zakho (loan)	?	(5)
2022–2023	Al-Ahli	26	(1)
2023–2024	Emirates	12	(1)

International career^{‡}
2011	Cameroon U20	3	(0)
2014–	Cameroon	13	(0)
- * Club domestic league appearances and goals as of 21:14, 18 March 2022 (UTC) ‡ National team caps and goals as of 13:57, 14 November 2018 (UTC)

Franck Kom (born 18 September 1991) is a Cameroonian professional footballer who plays as a midfielder.
