= Issa Sarr =

Senegalese footballer

Personal information
- Date of birth: 9 October 1986 (age 40)
- Place of birth: Dakar, Senegal
- Height: 1.81 m (5 ft 11 in)
- Position: Midfielder

Team information
- Current team: Orlando Pirates (youth development)

Senior career*
| Years | Team | Apps | (Gls) |
| 2009–2011 | ASC Diaraf | 57 | (5) |
| 2011–2013 | AS Pikine | 35 | (3) |
| 2013 | Chippa United | 12 | (0) |
| 2013–2014 | Platinum Stars | 25 | (4) |
| 2014–2018 | Orlando Pirates | 103 | (12) |
| 2019–2020 | Uthongathi | 36 | (5) |
| 2021–2024 | TTM FC | 14 | (2) |

International career^{‡}
| 2011 | Senegal | 2 | (0) |
- * Club domestic league appearances and goals as of 14:58, 24 December 2019 (UTC) ‡ National team caps and goals as of 3 April 2016

Issa Sarr (born 9 October 1986) is a Senegalese professional footballer who is currently coaching for Orlando Pirates FC youth development.
