= Zied Boughattas =

Tunisian footballer

Personal information
- Date of birth: 5 December 1990 (age 35)
- Place of birth: Beni Hassen, Tunisia
- Height: 1.93 m (6 ft 4 in)
- Position: Centre-back

Senior career*
Years	Team	Apps	(Gls)
2011–2020	L'Étoile	139	(8)
2020–2021	ENPPI	14	(0)
2021–2026	ES Sahel	44	(1)

International career
2015–2019	Tunisia	11	(0)
- * Club domestic league appearances and goals as of 20 June 2026 @ 08:00(AEST)

Zied Boughattas (Arabic: زياد بوغطاس; born 25 December 1990) is a Tunisian professional footballer who plays as a centre-back.

== Club career ==
Boughattas played for ES Sahel from 2011 to 2020. In November 2020, he joined ENPPI on a three-year deal.

== International career ==
Boughattas joined to the Tunisia national team during the 2016 African Nations Championship. His international debut was against Morocco in June 2015.
