= Mpho Makola =

South African soccer player

Personal information
- Full name: Mpho Terence Makola
- Date of birth: 4 May 1986 (age 40)
- Place of birth: Alexandra, South Africa
- Height: 1.70 m (5 ft 7 in)
- Position: Midfielder

Team information
- Current team: Polokwane City
- Number: 8

Youth career
- Alex Sheffield
- 1999–2003: Kaizer Chiefs
- Bidvest Wits
- Vaal University of Technology
- Africa Sport Youth

Senior career*
Years	Team	Apps	(Gls)
2008–2012	Free State Stars	68	(6)
2012–2019	Orlando Pirates	137	(14)
2019–2023	Cape Town City	81	(3)
2023–	Polokwane City	5	(0)

International career^{‡}
2015–	South Africa	7	(2)
- * Club domestic league appearances and goals as of 1 May 2023 ‡ National team caps and goals as of 6 September 2016

Mpho Makola (born 4 May 1986) is a South African soccer player who plays as a midfielder for National First Division club Polokwane City. He previously played for Free State Stars and Orlando Pirates, before being transferred to Cape Town City in 2019. He parted ways with Cape Town City in early February 2023.

== Early life ==
Makola was born and raised in Alexandra and attended school in Yeoville Community Primary School and Barnato Park High School where he was a sports all rounder. He joined the Kaizer Chiefs academy in 1999 from Alex Sheffield. By the age of 15, Makola became his family's main breadwinner and took care of his mother and six siblings. As a teenager, Makola consumed drugs and hung around gangsters and nearly joined a hijacking syndicate. He later played for Vaal University of Technology and earned R900 a month.

== Career statistics ==
As of 30 January 2018

Appearances and goals by club, season and competition
Club	Season	League			Cup		League Cup		Other		Total	
Club	Season	Division	Apps	Goals	Apps	Goals	Apps	Goals	Apps	Goals	Apps	Goals
Free State Stars	2009–10	Premier Soccer League	26	3	0	0	0	0	0	0	26	3
Free State Stars	2010–11	Premier Soccer League	26	1	0	0	0	0	0	0	26	1
Free State Stars	2011–12	Premier Soccer League	16	2	3	0	0	0	0	0	19	2
Free State Stars	Total		68	6	3	0	0	0	0	0	71	6
Orlando Pirates	2012–13	Premier Soccer League	9	1	0	0	0	0	2 (Note: Appearances in MTN 8)	0	11	1
Orlando Pirates	2013–14	Premier Soccer League	17	2	5	1	0	0	3 (Note: Appearances in CAF Champions League)	1	25	4
Orlando Pirates	2014–15	Premier Soccer League	25	3	2	0	2	0	4	0	33	3
Orlando Pirates	2015–16	Premier Soccer League	24	7	5	1	3	1	1	0	33	9
Orlando Pirates	2016–17	Premier Soccer League	26	0	5	2	3	1	1	0	35	3
Orlando Pirates	2017–18	Premier Soccer League	17	1	0	0	2	1	0	0	19	2
Orlando Pirates	Total		118	14	17	4	10	3	11	1	156	22
Career totals			186	20	20	4	10	3	11	1	227	28

== International career ==
He scored on his international debut against Senegal in an international friendly on 8 September 2015.

=== International goals ===
Scores and results list South Africa's goal tally first.

Goal	Date	Venue	Opponent	Score	Result	Competition
1.	8 September 2015	Orlando Stadium, Johannesburg, South Africa	Senegal	1–0	1–0	Friendly
2.	6 September 2016	Orlando Stadium, Johannesburg, South Africa	Egypt	1–0	1–0	Friendly
