= Thabo Matlaba =

South African soccer player (born 1987)

Personal information
- Date of birth: 13 December 1987 (age 38)
- Place of birth: Tembisa, South Africa
- Height: 1.69 m (5 ft 7 in)
- Position: Left-back

Team information
- Current team: Lamontville Golden Arrows F.C.
- Number: 28

Youth career
- Leicester City (South Africa)
- Mighty Tigers
- M Tigers

Senior career*
Years	Team	Apps	(Gls)
2010–2011	Free State Stars	33	(3)
2012–2019	Orlando Pirates	149	(9)
2019–2020	Black Leopards	24	(1)
2020–2021	Swallows	40	(0)
2022–2025	Royal AM	72	(5)
2025–	Lamontville Golden Arrows F.C.	9	(0)

International career^{‡}
2011–	South Africa	29	(1)
- * Club domestic league appearances and goals as of 4 January 2026 ‡ National team caps and goals as of 12 November 2016

Thabo "Festival" Matlaba (born 13 December 1987) is a South African professional association footballer who plays as a left-back for Premier Soccer League club Golden Arrows. He is known for his long range shots with both his feet. Although he plays mostly as a left back, Matlaba is naturally right-footed.

== Club career ==
=== Orlando Pirates ===
Matlaba played for Orlando Pirates from the 2012 till 2019.

=== Golden Arrows ===
In 2025 he joined Premier Soccer League club Golden Arrows.

== International career ==
Matlaba made his debut for South Africa on 14 May 2011 versus Tanzania in an international friendly.

Matlaba scored his first international goal with a 40-yard (37 m) drive in a World Cup qualifier against the Central African Republic on 23 March 2013.

== Career statistics ==
=== Club ===
As of 30 January 2018

Appearances and goals by club, season and competition
Club	Season	League			National cup		League cup		Other		Total	
Club	Season	Division	Apps	Goals	Apps	Goals	Apps	Goals	Apps	Goals	Apps	Goals
Free State Stars	2010–11	Premier Soccer League	27	3	0	0	0	0	0	0	27	3
Free State Stars	2011–12	Premier Soccer League	6	0	0	0	0	0	0	0	6	0
Free State Stars	Total		33	3	0	0	0	0	0	0	33	3
Orlando Pirates	2011–12	Premier Soccer League	12	0	1	0	0	0	0	0	13	0
Orlando Pirates	2012–13	Premier Soccer League	22	1	1	0	2	1	2 (Note: Appearances in MTN 8)	0	27	2
Orlando Pirates	2013–14	Premier Soccer League	25	2	5	0	4	0	11 (Note: Three appearances in MTN 8, eight appearances in CAF Champions League)	2	45	4
Orlando Pirates	2014–15	Premier Soccer League	17	1	2	0	0	0	4	1	23	2
Orlando Pirates	2015–16	Premier Soccer League	24	3	5	0	3	0	0	0	32	3
Orlando Pirates	2016–17	Premier Soccer League	24	1	5	0	3	0	1	0	33	1
Orlando Pirates	2017–18	Premier Soccer League	15	1	0	0	2	0	0	0	17	1
Orlando Pirates	Total		139	9	19	0	14	1	18	3	190	13
Career total			172	12	19	0	14	1	18	3	223	16

=== International ===
Scores and results list South Africa's goal tally first.

Goal	Date	Venue	Opponent	Score	Result	Competition
1.	23 March 2013	Cape Town Stadium, Cape Town, South Africa	Central African Republic	1–0	2–0	2014 FIFA World Cup qualification
