= Thabo Rakhale =

South African soccer player

Personal information
- Date of birth: 20 March 1990 (age 36)
- Place of birth: Vanderbijlpark, South Africa
- Height: 1.74 m (5 ft 9 in)
- Position: Winger

Youth career
- North-West University

Senior career*
Years	Team	Apps	(Gls)
2010–2012	Sivutsa Stars		
2012–2017	Orlando Pirates	68	(3)
2012–2013	→ Sivutsa Stars (loan)	23	(10)
2013–2014	→ Polokwane City (loan)	22	(1)
2017–2020	Chippa United	59	(5)
2020–2021	Tshakuma Tsha Madzivhandila	23	(3)
2021–2022	Sekhukhune United	7	(0)
2023-	Township Rollers	0	(0)
- * Club domestic league appearances and goals as of 30 October 2022

Thabo Rakhale (born 20 March 1990) is a South African professional soccer player who plays as a winger for Botswana club Township Rollers.

== Career ==
Having left Chippa United in the beginning of July 2020 following the expiration of his contract, Rakhale signed for Tshakhuma Tsha Madzivhandila in November. In June 2021, ahead of the 2021–22 season, he moved to Sekhukhune United.

== Style of play ==
Rakhale is known for his skills and flair on the pitch. His showboating has received mixed reception, with some seeing it as "childish" or "disrespectful". In EA Sports' FIFA 17 and FIFA 18 video games, he was one of a select few players to have five-star skills.
