= Thamsanqa Gabuza =

South African soccer player

Personal information
- Full name: Thamsanqa Aubrey Gabuza
- Date of birth: 27 July 1987 (age 39)
- Place of birth: Ladysmith, South Africa
- Height: 1.83 m (6 ft 0 in)
- Position: Forward

Youth career
- Tornado FC
- Maritzburg City
- Abaqulusi

Senior career*
Years	Team	Apps	(Gls)
2008–2009	Durban Stars	21	(16)
2009–2013	Golden Arrows	88	(23)
2013–2019	Orlando Pirates	71	(8)
2019–2023	SuperSport United	103	(19)
2023–2024	TS Galaxy	8	(0)

International career^{‡}
2012–2017	South Africa	16	(6)
- * Club domestic league appearances and goals as of 26 July 2024 ‡ National team caps and goals as of 7 October 2022

Thamsanqa Aubrey Gabuza (born 27 July 1987) is a South African soccer player who plays as a striker. He formerly played for Bafana Bafana.

Gabuza was released by TS Galaxy in January 2024. He was without a club for the rest of the 2023–24 South African Premier Division campaign, but started training with Maritzburg United in the summer.

== Career statistics ==
=== International ===
Appearances and goals by national team and year
National team	Year	Apps	Goals
South Africa	2012	1	0
South Africa	2013	–	
South Africa	2014	–	
South Africa	2015	8	4
South Africa	2016	6	2
South Africa	2017	1	0
Total		16	6

Scores and results list South Africa's goal tally first, score column indicates score after each Gabuza goal.

List of international goals scored by Thamsanqa Gabuza
No.	Date	Venue	Opponent	Score	Result	Competition
1	16 June 2015	Cape Town Stadium, Cape Town, South Africa	Angola	1–1	2–1	Friendly
2	20 June 2015	Dobsonville Stadium, Johannesburg, South Africa	Mauritius	1–0	3–0	2016 African Nations Championship qualification
3	5 September 2015	Stade Olympique, Nouakchott, Mauritania	Mauritania	1–1	1–3	2017 Africa Cup of Nations qualification
4	13 November 2015	Estádio Nacional de Ombaka, Benguela, Angola	Angola	2–1	3–1	2018 FIFA World Cup qualification
5	4 June 2016	Independence Stadium, Bakau, Gambia	Gambia	1–0	4–0	2017 Africa Cup of Nations qualification
6	4 June 2016	Independence Stadium, Bakau, Gambia	Gambia	2–0	4–0	2017 Africa Cup of Nations qualification
