= Alaya Brigui =

Tunisian footballer

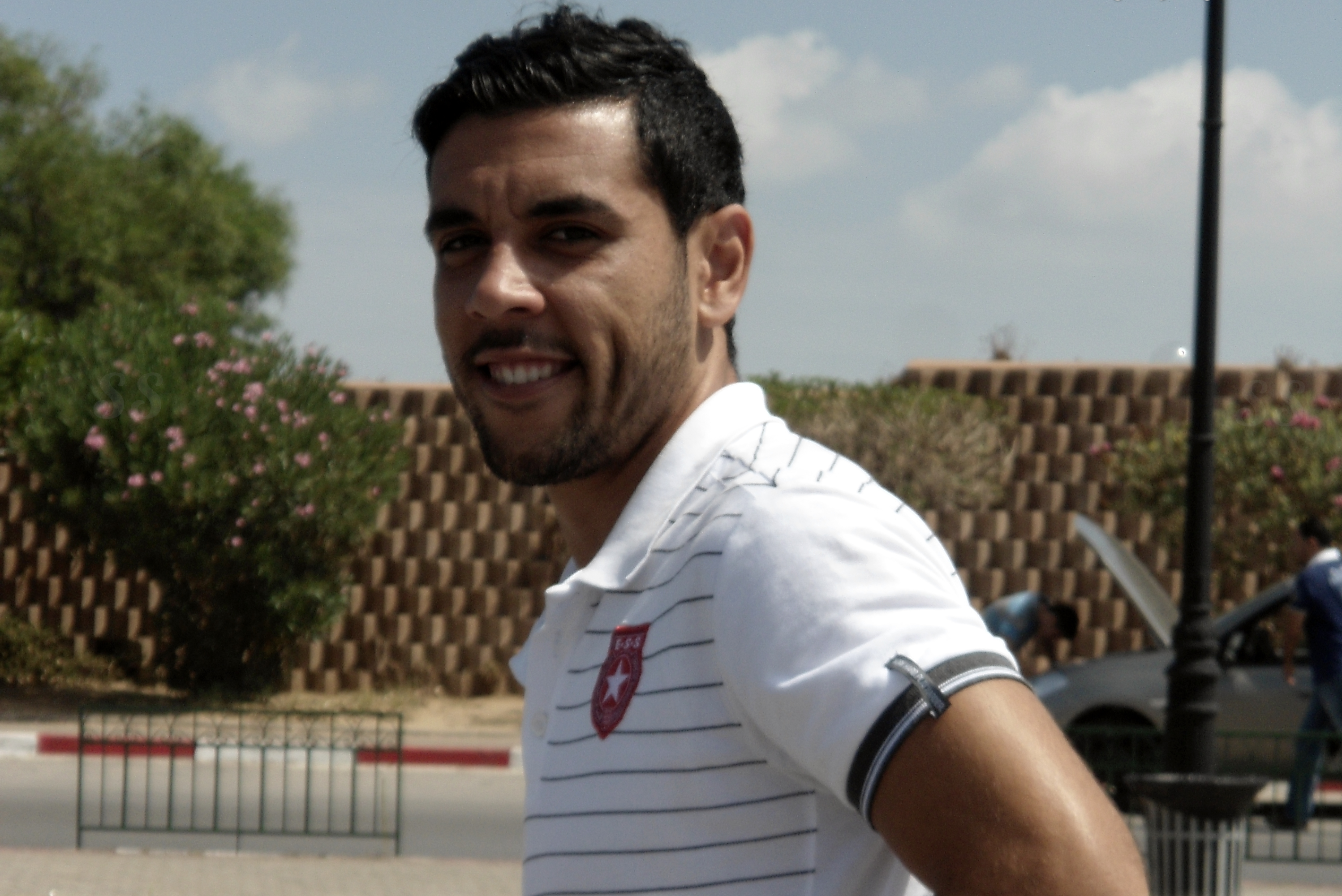

Personal information
- Full name: Alaya Brigui
- Date of birth: 1 January 1992 (age 34)
- Place of birth: Sousse, Tunisia
- Height: 1.76 m (5 ft 9 in)
- Position: Midfielder

Senior career*
Years	Team	Apps	(Gls)
2011–2020	Étoile du Sahel	139	(16)
2020–2022	US Ben Guerdane	29	(3)
2022	Al-Okhdood	0	(0)
2022-2024	Étoile du Sahel	11	(0)

International career^{‡}
2012–2016	Tunisia	4	(0)
- * Club domestic league appearances and goals as of 17 July 2026 ‡ National team caps and goals as of 2 February 2014

Alaya Brigui is a Tunisian footballer who plays as a midfielder, most recently for Saudi Arabian club Al-Okhdood. He made his debut for the Tunisia national football team in 2012.

On 13 January 2022, Brigui joined Saudi Arabian club Al-Okhdood.
