= Saddam Ben Aziza =

Tunisian footballer

Personal information
- Date of birth: 8 February 1991 (age 35)
- Place of birth: Akouda, Tunisia
- Height: 1.87 m (6 ft 2 in)
- Position: Defender

Team information
- Current team: Étoile Sahel
- Number: 2

Youth career
- 2000–2011: Étoile Sahel

Senior career*
Years	Team	Apps	(Gls)
2011–2013	Beni-Khalled	7	(0)
2013–2014	Olympique Béja	9	(1)
2014–2016	Étoile Sahel	17	(1)
2016–2017	Al-Shamal	0	(0)
2017	Métlaoui	8	(0)
2017–2018	Gabès	22	(2)
2018–	Étoile Sahel	46	(1)

International career^{‡}
2019–	Tunisia	4	(0)
- * Club domestic league appearances and goals as of 00:20, 7 April 2021 (UTC) ‡ National team caps and goals as of 00:20, 7 April 2021 (UTC)

Saddam Ben Aziza (Arabic: صدام بن عزيزة, born 8 February 1991) is a Tunisian professional footballer who plays as a defender for the Tunisian club Étoile Sahel.

== Club career ==
Ben Aziza is a youth product of Étoile Sahel, and signed his first contract with the club on 28 December 2009. He made his professional debut with Beni-Khalled in a 1–0 Tunisian Ligue Professionnelle 1 loss to ES Tunis on 22 August 2012.

== International career ==
Ben Aziza debuted for the Tunisia national team in a 1–0 2020 African Nations Championship qualification victory over Libya on 21 September 2021.
