= Ammar Jemal =

Tunisian footballer

Personal information
- Date of birth: 20 April 1987 (age 39)
- Place of birth: M'saken, Tunisia
- Height: 1.81 m (5 ft 11 in)
- Position: Defender

Youth career
- 2006–2007: Etoile du Sahel

Senior career*
Years	Team	Apps	(Gls)
2007–2010	Etoile du Sahel		
2010–2012	Young Boys	26	(5)
2011–2012	→ 1. FC Köln (loan)	15	(1)
2012–2013	Ajaccio	1	(0)
2013–2014	Club Africain	4	(0)
2013–2014	→ Al-Fateh (loan)	18	(0)
2014–2017	Etoile du Sahel	56	(5)
2017–2018	Al-Arabi	11	(1)
2018–2020	Etoile du Sahel	24	(1)
2020–2021	Al-Sahel	13	(1)

International career
2009–2015	Tunisia	31	(6)
- * Club domestic league appearances and goals

Ammar Jemal (Arabic: عمار الجمل; born 20 April 1987) is a Tunisian professional footballer who plays as a defender. He made 31 appearances for the Tunisia national team scoring six goals.

== Career ==
Jemal was born in M'saken, Tunisia.

On 11 June 2009, Jemal was linked with a move to French club FC Nantes on a four-year contract. This move would have reunited him with his former coach Gernot Rohr, but the transfer was later cancelled. On 7 May 2010, he announced his resignation from Etoile du Sahel and signed with BSC Young Boys. Jemal started the first leg of their Champions League Playoff against Tottenham Hotspur because of an injury to regular center back Emiliano Dudar.

On 30 August 2011, Jemal went on loan to 1. FC Köln for one year followed by a call back and buy option.

== Career statistics ==
Scores and results list Tunisia's goal tally first

No	Date	Venue	Opponent	Score	Result	Competition
1.	28 March 2009	Nyayo National Stadium, Nairobi, Kenya	Kenya	1–0	2–1	2010 FIFA World Cup qualification
2.	10 August 2011	Stade Mustapha Ben Jannet, Munastir, Tunisia	Mali	2–0	4–2	Friendly
3.	22 August 2011	Amman International Stadium, Amman, Jordan	Jordan	1–1	3–3	Friendly
4.	22 August 2011	Amman International Stadium, Amman, Jordan	Jordan	3–3	3–3	Friendly
5.	27 May 2012	Stade Mustapha Ben Jannet, Monastir, Tunisia	Rwanda	1–0	5–1	Friendly
6.	15 August 2012	Széktói Stadion, Kecskemét, Hungary	Iran	1–1	2–2	Friendly
