= 1922 regnal list of Ethiopia =

Pseudohistorical list of Ethiopian monarchs from 4530 BCE to 1779 CE

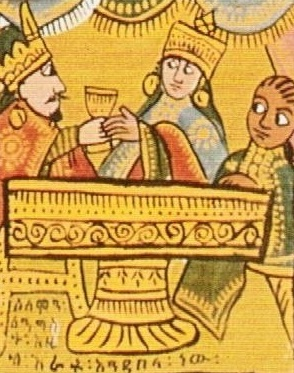
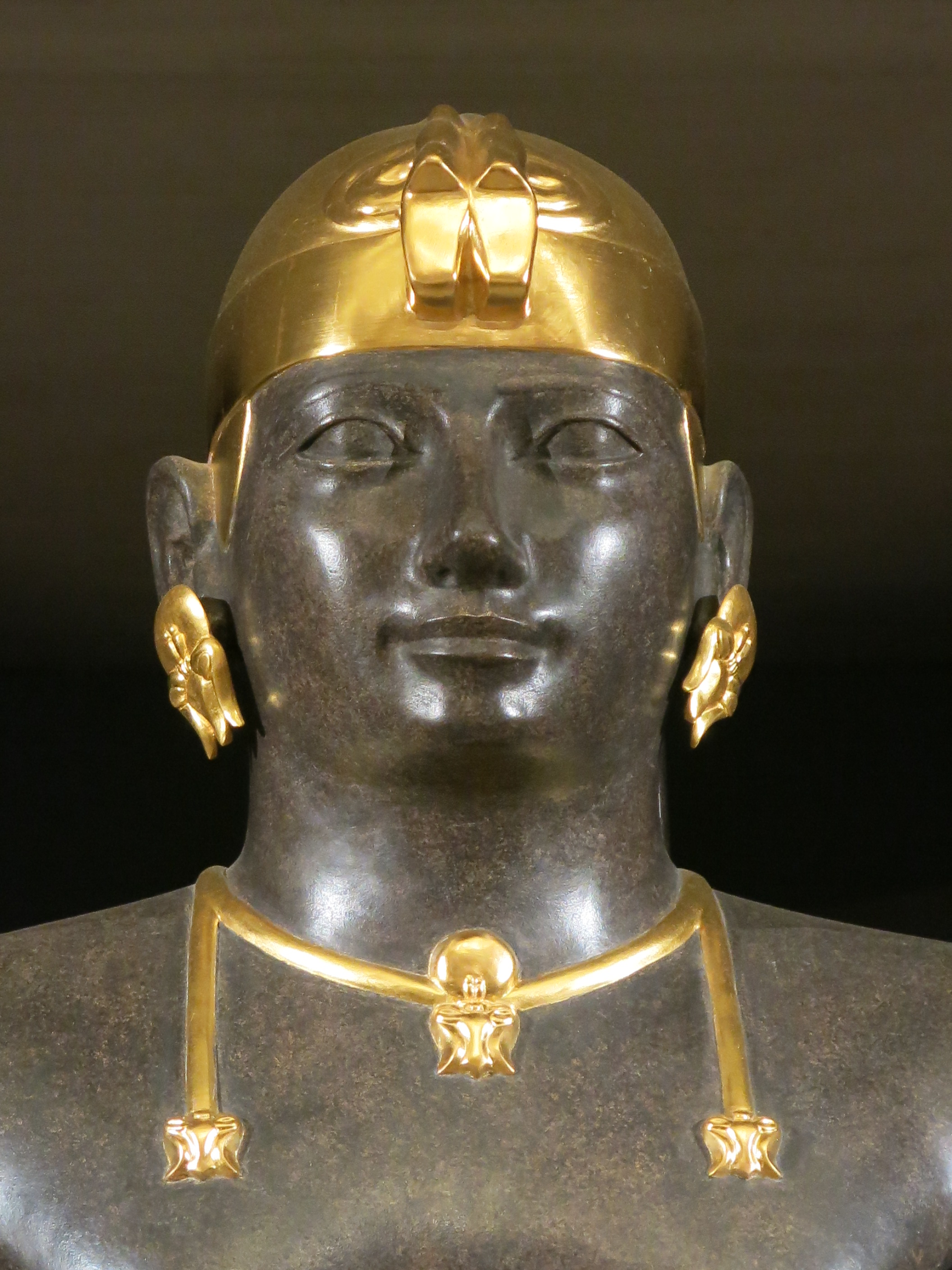
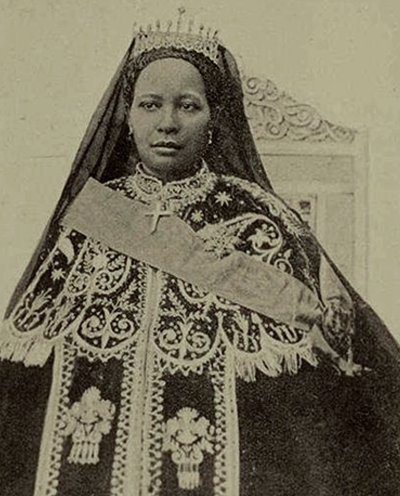
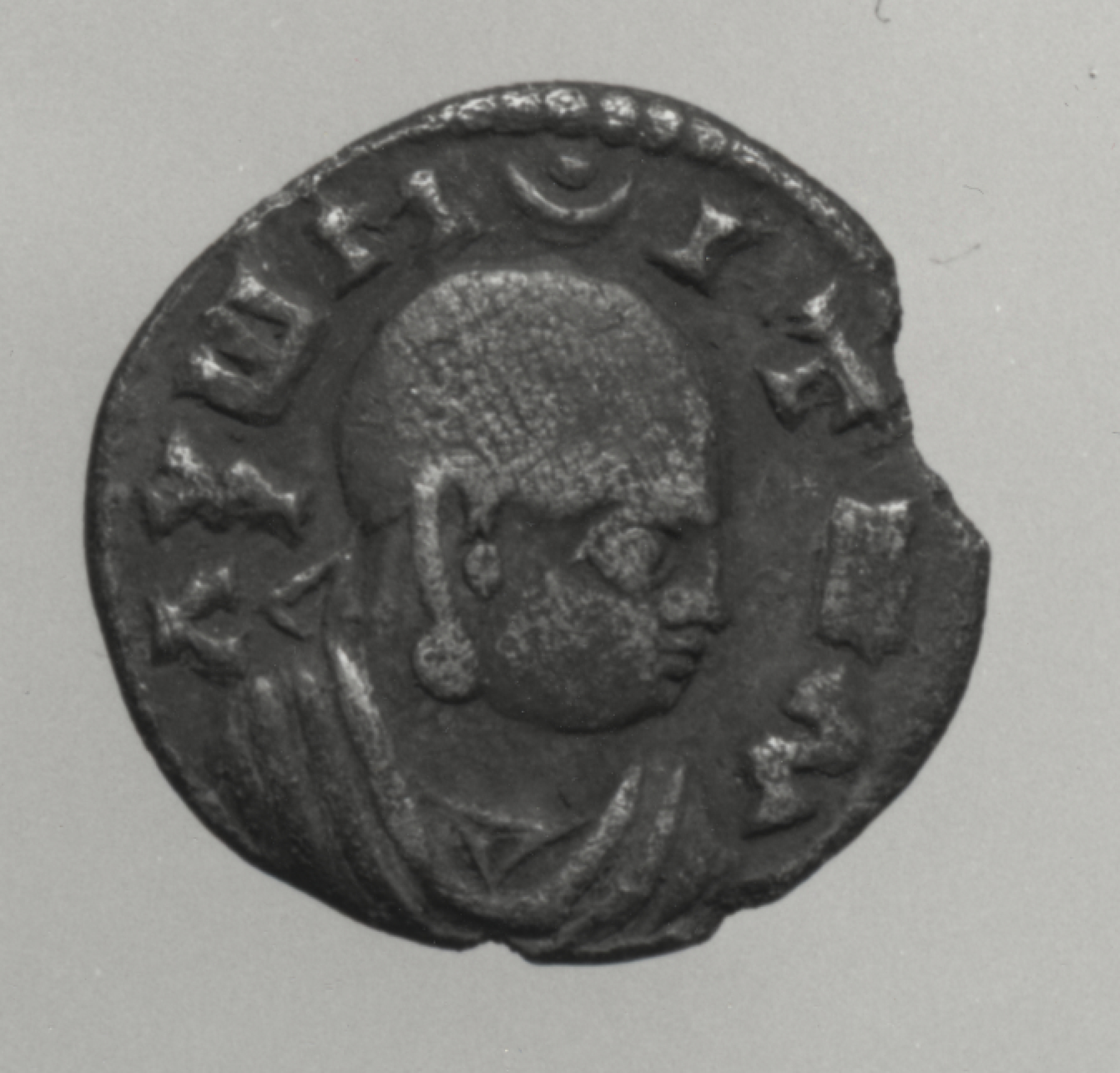
The 1922 regnal list incorporated names from Biblical, Egyptological, Greco-Roman, and native Ethiopian sources. Clockwise from upper left: (1) Makeda, the Queen of Sheba, dining with Solomon, (2) Pharaoh Taharqa of Kush, (3) Ousanas of the Kingdom of Axum and (4) Zewditu, incumbent Empress of Ethiopia at the time the list was written.

The 1922 regnal list of Ethiopia is an official regnal list used by the Ethiopian monarchy, which names over 300 monarchs across six millennia. The list is partially inspired by older Ethiopian regnal lists and chronicles, but is notable for additional monarchs who ruled Nubia, which was known as Aethiopia in ancient times. Also included are various figures from Greek mythology and the Biblical canon who were known to be "Aethiopian", as well as figures who originated from Egyptian sources (Ancient Egyptian, Coptic and Arabic).

This list of monarchs was included in Charles Fernand Rey's 1927 book In the Country of the Blue Nile and is the longest Ethiopian regnal list published in the Western world. It is the only known regnal list that attempts to provide a timeline of Ethiopian monarchs from the 46th century BC up to modern times without any gaps. However, earlier portions of the regnal list are pseudohistorical and were recent additions to Ethiopian tradition when the list was written. Despite claims by at least one Ethiopian court historian that the list dates back to ancient times, the list is more likely an early 20th-century creation, possibly originally written by Alaqa Taye Gabra Mariam or Heruy Wolde Selassie. The earlier sections of the list are clearly inspired by the work of French historian Louis J. Morié, who published a two-volume history of "Ethiopia" (i.e., Nubia and Abyssinia) in 1904. His work drew on then-recent Egyptological research but attempted to combine this with the Biblical canon and writings by ancient Greek authors. This resulted in a pseudohistorical work that was more imaginative than scientific in its approach to Ethiopian history.

This regnal list contains a great deal of conflation between the history of modern-day Ethiopia and Aethiopia, a term used in ancient times and in some Biblical translations to refer to a generalised region south of Egypt, most commonly in reference to the Kingdom of Kush in modern-day Sudan. As a result, many parts of this article will deal with the history of ancient Sudan and how this became interwoven into the history of the Kingdom of Axum, the region of Abyssinia (which includes modern-day Eritrea), and the modern state of Ethiopia. The territory of modern-day Ethiopia and Eritrea was known as "Abyssinia" to Europeans until the mid-20th century, and, as such, this term will be used occasionally in this article to distinguish it from 'ancient' Aethiopia (i.e., Nubia).

== Background ==
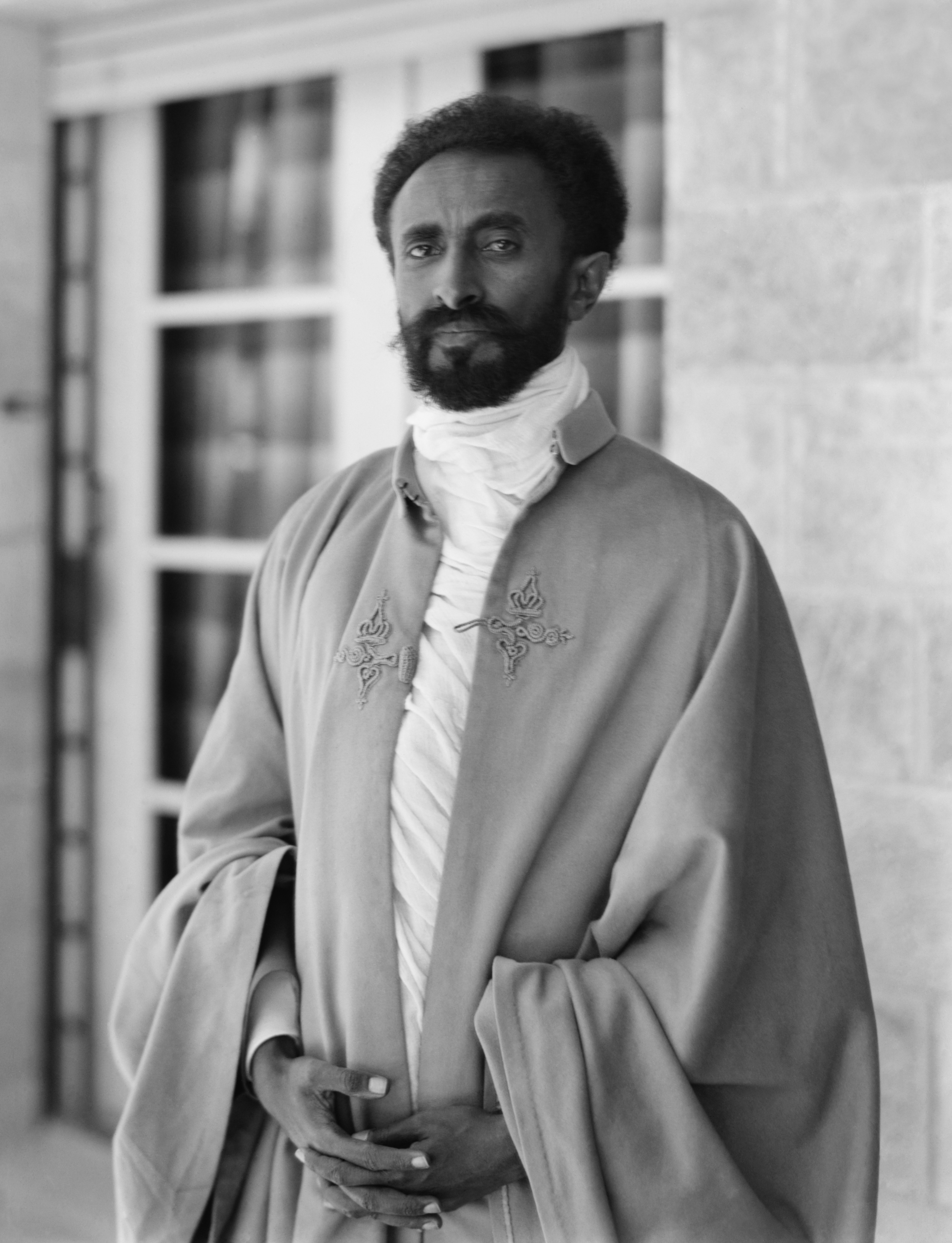
Tafari Makonnen in 1923

=== Origins and alleged antiquity ===
Charles Fernand Rey's 1927 book In the Country of the Blue Nile included a 13-page appendix listing Ethiopian monarchs, written by the Prince Regent Tafari Makonnen, who later became the Emperor of Ethiopia in 1930. Tafari's list begins in 4530 BC and ends in 1779 AD, with dates following the Ethiopian Calendar, which is several years behind the Gregorian calendar. Tafari's cover letter was written in the town of Addis Ababa on the 11th day of Sane, 1914 (Ethiopian Calendar), which was June 19, 1922 on the Gregorian Calendar according to Rey.

Rey revealed in another book he wrote, Unconquered Abyssinia, that this list was given to him in 1924 by a court historian who was a "learned old gentleman". This court historian had "caused to be compiled [...] on the instructions of Ras Tafari" a complete list of "rulers of Abyssinia from the beginning of time up to date." Rey noted that the list contained many names "of Egyptian origin", which was a "good illustration" of the difficulties in researching the history of Abyssinia. The court historian claimed that the regnal list had already been compiled before the "advent of the Ethiopian dynasty in Egypt" and that the original version had been taken to Egypt and left there, afterward becoming lost.

Prince Ermias Sahle Selassie, president of the Crown Council of Ethiopia, acknowledged the regnal list in a speech given in 2011 in which he stated:

Ethiopian tradition traces the origins of the dynasty to a king called Ori, who lived about 4470 BC [sic]. While the reality of such a vastly remote provenance must be considered in semi-mythic terms, it remains certain that Ethiopia, also known as the Kingdom of Kush, was already ancient by the time of David and Solomon's rule in Jerusalem.

The goal of the 1922 regnal list was to showcase the immense longevity of the Ethiopian monarchy. The list does this by providing precise dates spanning 6,300 years and drawing upon various historical traditions from both within and outside Ethiopia.

Multiple versions of the regnal list are known to exist. Tafari's regnal list has 313 numbered monarchs from 4530 BC to 1779 AD (E.C.) while Taye Gabra Mariam's version of the list continued up to contemporary times to include influential Rases of the Zemene Mesafint and emperors who had reigned since the time of Tewodros II.

The first three dynasties (4530–982 BC) of the list are mostly legendary and take various elements from the Bible, as well as Ancient Egyptian, Nubian, Greek, Coptic and Arab sources. Many of the monarchs of the Menelik dynasty (982 BC–AD 920) appear on Ethiopian regnal lists written before 1922. Still, these lists often contradict each other, and many of the kings themselves are not archeologically verified, though in some cases their existence is confirmed by Aksumite coinage. Many of the historically verified rulers of the Ag'azyan (1985–982 BC) and Menelik dynasties did not rule over the region of modern Ethiopia but rather over Egypt and/or Nubia. It is only from the mid-1st century onward that the monarchs are certainly Aksumite or "Abyssinian" in origin.

Each monarch on the list has their respective reign dates and the number of years in their reign listed. Two columns of reign dates were used in the list. One column uses dates according to the Ethiopian calendar, while the other column lists the "Year of the World", placing the creation of the world in 5500 BC. Other Ethiopian texts and documents have also placed a similar date for the creation of the world. The dating of 5500 BC as the creation of the world was influenced by calculations from the Alexandrian and Byzantine eras which placed the world's creation in 5493 BC and 5509 BC respectively.

=== Authorship ===
Neither Tafari Makonnen nor Charles Rey explicitly stated who originally wrote the regnal list or who supplied Tafari with a copy. Both Heruy Wolde Selassie and Alaqa Taye Gabra Mariam included versions of the list in their work; there is clear evidence that a large part of the list's early sections was lifted from the work of an obscure French historian, Louis J. Morié.

==== Heruy Wolde Selassie and Wazema ====
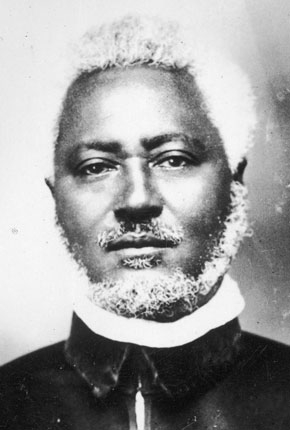
Heruy Wolde Selassie in a photograph taken prior to 1939

German historian Manfred Kropp believed the author of the regnal list was Ethiopian foreign minister Heruy Wolde Selassie (1878–1938). Selassie was a philosopher and historian, and had mastered several European languages. He had previously served as secretary to Emperor Menelik II (r. 1889–1913). At the time the list was written in 1922, Selassie was president of the special court in Addis Ababa, whose job was to resolve disputes between Ethiopians and foreigners.

Kropp noted that Selassie's historical sources include the Bible, Christian Arab writers Jirjis al-Makin Ibn al-'Amid (1205–1273) and Ibn al-Rāhib (1205–1295), and Christian traveller and writer Sextus Julius Africanus (c. 160–240). Kropp argued that Selassie was one of the Ethiopian writers who sought to synchronize Ethiopian history with the wider Christian-Oriental histories. This was aided by the translation of Arabic texts in the 17th century. Kropp also felt that the developing field of Egyptology influenced Selassie's writings, particularly from Eduard Meyer, Gaston Maspero, and Alexandre Moret, whose works were published in French in Addis Ababa in the early 20th century. Kropp believed that Selassie was also assisted by French missionaries and the works they held in their libraries. Kropp additionally theorized that Tafari Makonnen played a large role in the writing of the list.

Selassie wrote a book titled Wazema, which contained a version of the regnal list. The title "Wazema" translates to The Vigil, a metaphor celebrating the history of the kings of Ethiopia. The book was divided into two sections: the first covers Ethiopian political history from the dawn of history to modern times, while the second covers the history of the Ethiopian church. Kropp noted that there were three different versions of the regnal list published in Selassie's works. Selassie's regnal list omits the first dynasty of Tafari's list – the so-called "Tribe of Ori or Aram" – and also the first three rulers of the second dynasty, instead beginning in 2545 BC with king Sebtah. Selassie himself stated that he used European literature as a source, including James Bruce's Travels to Discover the Source of the Nile (1790). Manfred Kropp felt that the existence of multiple versions of the regnal list suggested that Selassie grew increasingly critical of the sources he used for the first version in 1922. Ethiopian historian Sergew Hable Selassie commented that Heruy Wolde Selassie "strove for accuracy" but the sources he used for Wazema "precluded his success".

Manfred Kropp noted one important source for the information in Wazema. Selassie himself told the reader that if they wished to learn more about Joktan, the supposed founder of the Ag'azyan dynasty, they could consult page 237 of a book by "Moraya". At first, Kropp thought this was referring to Alexandre Moret, but it was later made clear that Selassie's regnal list had been significantly inspired by a book called Histoire de l'Éthiopie by Louis J. Morié, published in 1904.

==== Louis J. Morié's Histoire de l'Éthiopie ====
Louis J. Morié was a French historian who wrote a history of Ethiopia in the early 20th century. The two-volume work, titled Histoire de l'Éthiopie (Nubie et Abyssinie), was published in 1904, with the first volume focusing on ancient Nubia (called "Ancient Ethiopia" by Morié) and the second on Abyssinia ("Modern Ethiopia"). An abridged edition was printed in 1897, but only 100 copies were made for the author's friends. Historian Manfred Kropp identified the first volume as a key source in the creation of the 1922 Ethiopian regnal list and provided evidence from Morié's text that corroborated the names and information on the list. Kropp noted that Morié's book was more imaginative than scientific in its approach to Ethiopian history and blamed Selassie's European friends and contemporaries for the influence of Morié's book on Selassie's writing of Ethiopian history. E. A. Wallis Budge mentions Morié's book in his own similarly titled two-volume work A History of Ethiopia: Nubia and Abyssinia, but surprisingly makes no mention of the clear similarity between Morié's narrative and the 1922 Ethiopian regnal list. Charles Rey, in his book Unconquered Abyssinia, mentioned an "enthusiastic French writer" who had dated "the birth of the Abyssinian monarchy from the foundation of the Kingdom of Meroë by Cush about 5800 B.C." but Rey felt this writer could "not be taken seriously" because of his belief that the Deluge was a historical event. Rey was likely referring to Morié, who had claimed that 5800 BC was the approximate date when Cush began ruling Aethiopia, and he also treated the Biblical flood narrative as a historical fact. Like Budge, Rey apparently did not notice the striking similarities between Morié's narrative and the 1922 Ethiopian regnal list.

Writing for Asiatic Review, Frederick A. Edwards noted that Morié had "[attempted] to bring all the Kings named in the various [Ethiopian] lists into one line of succession" but warned readers that his work was an "unsafe guide" that "may well be disregarded" despite "[posing] as an authoritative precisian". Edwards observed that Morié's "identifications and his dates are quite arbitrary" and that he fails to provide authoritative sources explaining why he chose these dates. Edwards concludes his brief overview of Morié's work by stating "[Morié's] identifications of Kings in one list with those in another are often forced and unsatisfactory, and he has fallen into some obvious errors."

Morié's book displays his desire to hold on to religion and Biblical narratives in a world that was becoming increasingly secular. He expressed concern about the possibility of abandoning religion, which would result in the "civilized" peoples of the world descending the moral scale. Morié felt that science and religion could be in agreement. He described Atheism as a cause of moral and political decadence. Because of his anxieties about the decline of religion, Morié sought to base his historical narrative around the Biblical timeline. He described the Book of Genesis as the best source for the most remote parts of human history.

Morié believed the "Ethiopian state of Meroe" was the oldest empire of the post-Flood world, having been founded by Cush of the Bible, and went on to birth the kingdoms of Egypt, Uruk, Babylon, Assyria and Abyssinia. Morié followed the Biblical tradition by crediting Nimrod, a son of Cush, with founding Uruk and Babylon, and crediting Mizraim, a son of Ham, with founding Egypt. He additionally identified Mizraim with the Egyptian god Osiris, Ham with Amun and Cush with Khonsu. Morié defined the history of "Ethiopia" as divided into two parts: Ancient Nubia and Christian Abyssinia, and defined "Ethiopians" as the Nubian and Abyssinian peoples. Morié acknowledged the potential confusion this could cause and thus occasionally used "Abyssinia" to specify which of these two regions he was writing about, with a priority of using "Ethiopia" for ancient Nubia.

==== Alaqa Taye's History of the People of Ethiopia ====
Alaqa Taye Gabra Mariam (1861–1924) was a Protestant Ethiopian scholar, translator, and teacher whose written works include books on grammar, religion, and Ethiopian history. He was ordered by Emperor Menelik II to write a complete history of Ethiopia using Ethiopian, European and Arab sources. Taye's first historical work was Ya-Ityopya Hizb Tarik ("History of the People of Ethiopia"), published in 1922, the same year Tafari's regnal list was written. The book contained legends and folktales about the origins of various peoples of Ethiopia. Ya-Ityopya Hizb Tarik was a condensed form of a much larger work titled Ya-Ityopya Mangist Tarik ("History of the Ethiopian State"), which has not been published and is only known to exist in partial form as manuscripts. Sergew Hable Selassie felt this book did not "do justice to [Taye's] erudition and does not reflect his true ability", as it was based on "unreliable sources" and was "not at all systematic".

History of the People of Ethiopia contains a regnal list that matches closely with the one copied by Tafari. The first edition from 1922 included a list of monarchs who reigned after the birth of Christ, beginning with Bazen (8 BC). The sixth edition from 1965 expanded the list to include monarchs who reigned from Akhunas Saba II (1930 BC) onwards, corresponding with the Ag'azyan and Menelik dynasties of Tafari's list. The first edition does refer to the earlier dynasties of Ori and Kam and provides some background information on them, despite not including them in the regnal list at the end of the book. The longer text Ya-Ityopya Mangist Tarik originally contained more in-depth information on all the dynasties that appear on Tafari's version of the regnal list.

In recent years, there has been more credible and conclusive evidence that some of Alaqa Taye's manuscripts were acquired by Heruy Wolde Selassie and published as his own works, including Wazema. Such evidence strengthens the possibility that Taye wrote the original regnal list instead of Selassie. Ya-Ityopya Hizb Tarik preceded the publication of Heruy Wolde Selassie's book Wazema by at least seven years.

Like Selassie, Taye acknowledged Louis J. Morié, whose work he described as one of the many "learned books of history". Taye noted that his history had been selectively gathered from the works of Homer, Herodotus, James Bruce, Jean-François Champollion, Hiob Ludolf, Karl Wilhelm Isenberg, Werner Munzinger, Enno Littmann, Giacomo De Martino, 'Eli Samni', 'Traversi', 'Eli Bizon', 'Ignatius Guidi' (Ignatius of Jesus?), Al-Azraqi, Ibn Ishaq, 'Abul-'Izz', Bar Hebraeus (called "Abul-Farag"), Yohannis Madbir and Jirjis al-Makin Ibn al-'Amid (called "Giyorgis Walda Amid"). He also gathered information from an unnamed history of Yemen, the Alexander Romance (called "The Book of Alexander") and an ancient work of history found at Zaway. Taye additionally noted numerous Biblical verses that he recommended to readers "look [at] attentively" to understand the history of the Ethiopian peoples and kings. (Note: These verses are: 1 Kings 10.1-13 (Queen of Sheba and Solomon); 2 Chronicles 9.1-13 (Queen of Sheba and Solomon); 2 Chronicles 14.9 (mistakenly written as 14.1) (Zerah the Aethiopian); 2 Kings 19.9 (Taharqa or Tirhakah, King of Aethiopia); Isaiah 37.9 (Taharqa/Tirhakah); 2 Kings 19.35-37 (Defeat of Sennacherib); 2 Chronicles 32.19-23 (Defeat of Sennacherib); Isaiah 37.33-38 (Defeat of Sennacherib); 2 Chronicles 21.16-17 (Invasion of Judah by the Philistines, Arabs and Aethiopians); Jeremiah 38.7-13 (Ebed-Melech the Aethiopian); Jeremiah 39.16 (Ebed-Melech); Jeremiah 46.9-10 (Aethiopians in the army of Pharaoh Necho II); Ezekiel 38.1-10 (Gog and Magog and allies (including Aethiopia) attacking a restored land of Israel); Daniel 11.43 (A prophesied unnamed "King of the South" with Aethiopians aiding him); Nahum 3.7-9 (The Sack of Thebes, then ruled by the Aethiopians); Genesis 2.13 (The Gihon river that circles Aethiopia); Numbers 12.1-10 (Unnamed Aethiopian wife of Moses); Zephaniah 3.10 (Conversion of Gentiles, including those from "beyond the rivers of Aethiopia"); Psalms 68.30-31 ("Aethiopia shall soon stretch out her hands unto God"); Psalms 72.9-10 ("the kings of Sheba and Seba shall offer gifts"); Psalms 74.14; Psalms 87.4-5 ("behold Philistia, and Tyre, with Aethiopia"); Acts 8.26-35 (The Ethiopian eunuch sent by Candace, "queen of the Aethiopians").)

=== Other sources and cultural influences ===
==== Other Ethiopian regnal lists ====
Numerous regnal lists of Ethiopian monarchs from before 1922 are known to exist and clearly influenced the compilation of the 1922 list. Some lists date back to the 13th century and are reliable for the Solomonic dynasty, but are often based on legendary memories from the era of the Kingdom of Aksum. These lists allow chroniclers to provide proof of legitimacy for the Solomonic dynasty by linking it back to the Axumite period. The lists were also intended to fill in gaps between major events, such as the meeting of Makeda and Solomon in the 10th century BC, the arrival of Frumentius in the early 4th century and the rise of the Zagwe dynasty in the 10th century. However, many regnal lists show great variations in the names of the Axumite monarchs, with only a few, such as Menelik I, Bazen, Abreha and Atsbeha and Kaleb, frequently appearing across the majority of lists. The 1922 regnal list notably tries to accommodate these differing traditions by including most of the kings in a single longer line of succession.

==== Biblical influences ====
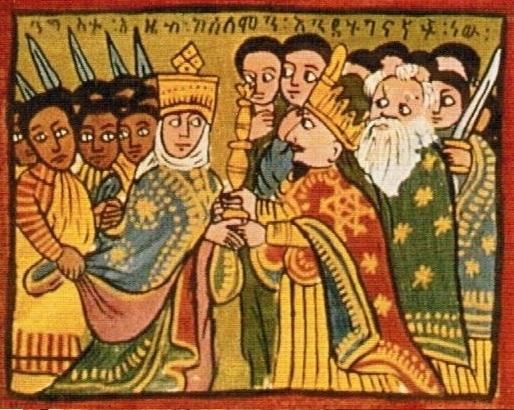
The Queen of Sheba meets King Solomon of Israel, from an illustration accompanying a copy of the Kebra Nagast.

Various Biblical figures are included on the 1922 regnal list. Three of Noah's descendants are named as founders or ancestors of the first three dynasties; Aram, Ham, and Joktan, with some of their sons and descendants also appearing on the list. Other Biblical figures include Zerah the Cushite and the Queen of Sheba, whom Ethiopians call "Makeda". According to Ethiopian tradition, Makeda was an ancestor of the Solomonic dynasty and mother of Menelik I, whose father was king Solomon of Israel. The meeting of Makeda and Solomon is recorded in the text Kebra Nagast. The Biblical events of the flood and the fall of the Tower of Babel are both included in the chronology of the regnal list, dated respectively to 3244 BC and 2713 BC, with the 531 years in between an interregnum where no kings are named. Another Biblical story included is that of the Ethiopian eunuch who visited Jerusalem during the reign of the 169th sovereign Garsemot Kandake.

==== Coptic and Arabic influences ====
The first dynasty of the regnal list, the Tribe of Ori, is taken from medieval Coptic and Arabic texts on the kings of Egypt who ruled before the Great Flood. Louis J. Morié compiled a list of monarchs similar to the 1922 list. Morié noted the regnal list he saw was recorded by the Copts in their annals and was found in both Coptic and Arabic tradition. He noted there had originally been a list of 40 kings, but only 19 of them had been preserved up to the early 20th century. He believed that the regnal list originated from the works of Murtada ibn al-Afif, an Arab writer from the 12th century who wrote some works, though only one, titled The Prodigies of Egypt, has partially survived to the present day. Alaqa Taye Gabra Mariam's statement "what we say from the historians of the ancients is from Murtad and the Azurotet of Egypt" seems to confirm Kropp's theory.

Manfred Kropp theorized the 1922 Ethiopian regnal list may have been influenced by the works of Ibn al-Rāhib, a 13th-century Coptic historian whose works were translated into Ge'ez by Ethiopian writer Enbaqom in the 16th century, and Jirjis al-Makin Ibn al-'Amid, another 13th century Coptic historian whose work Al-Majmu' al-Mubarak (The Blessed Collection) was also translated around the same time. Both writers drew on ancient history, citing Julius Africanus and, through him, the historical traditions of Egypt as recorded by Manetho. Jirgis was known as "Wälda-Amid" in Ethiopia. Kropp believed that some of the names of the early part of Tafari's regnal list were taken from a regnal list included within Jirgis' text, which draws upon traditions from Manetho and the Old Testament.

A medieval Arab text called Akhbar al-Zaman (The History of Time), dated to between 940 and 1140, may have been an earlier version of the regnal list Morié saw. It is likely based on earlier works such as those of Abu Ma'shar (dated to c. 840–860). The authorship is unknown, but it may have been written by historian Al-Masudi based on earlier Arab, Christian and Greek sources. Another possible author is Ibrahim ibn Wasif Shah who lived during the Twelfth century. The text contains a collection of lore about Egypt and the wider world in the age before the Great Flood and after it. Included is a list of kings of Egypt who ruled before the Great Flood, and this list shows some similarities with the list of kings of the "Tribe of Ori or Aram" included on Tafari's list, who also ruled before the Great Flood. Several kings share similar names and chronological order, though not all kings on one list appear on the other.

Many Coptic monks from Egypt came to Ethiopia in the 13th century and brought with them many books written in Coptic and Arabic. These monks also translated many works into Ge'ez. It is possible that the legends from Akhbar al-Zaman may have entered Ethiopia during this time.

==== Ancient Egyptian and Nubian influences ====
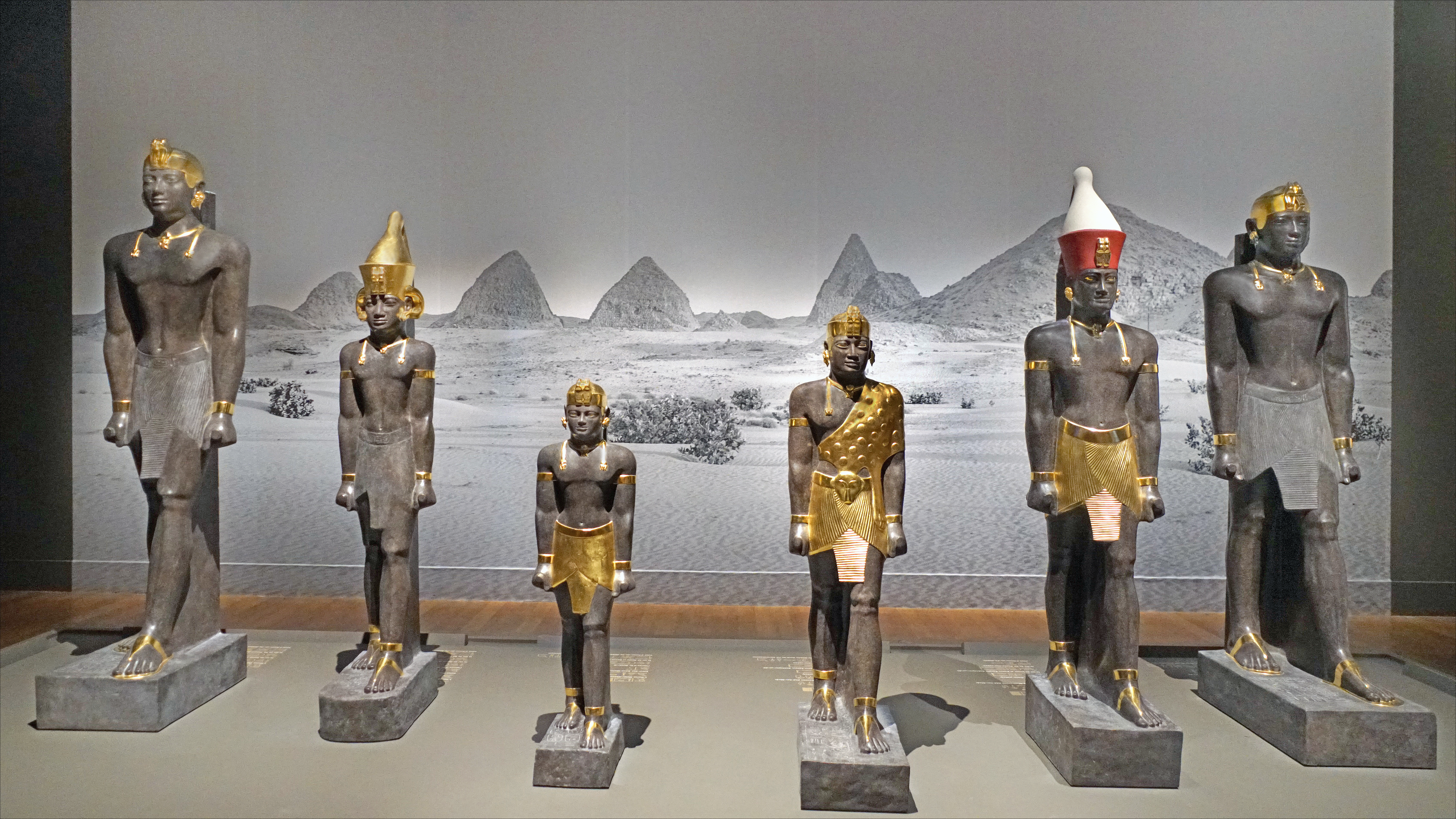
Reconstructions of six statues of Kushite kings discovered at Dukki-Gel in Sudan

Contemporary Egyptology had a significant influence on the regnal list, as evidenced by the large number of names from Ancient Egypt and the Kingdom of Kush. Many of the Egyptian and Kushite names included on the list belong to monarchs who did not rule the region of modern-day Ethiopia and Eritrea, and often have reign dates that do not match historical dates used by modern-day archaeologists. The rulers numbered 88 to 96 on the list are the High Priests of Amun who were the de facto rulers of Upper Egypt during the time of the Twenty-first dynasty (c. 1077–943 BC). Several other kings on the list have names that are clearly influenced by those of Egyptian pharaohs; Senefrou (8), Amen I (28), Amen II (43), Ramenpahte (44), Tutimheb (53), Amen Emhat I (63), Amen Emhat II (83), Amen Hotep (102), Ramissu (103), and Apras (127). Kushite rulers include the pharaohs of the Twenty-fifth Dynasty of Egypt, namely Piye (106), Kashta (108), Sabaka (109), Taharqa (111), Tantamani (114) and Shebitku (123), as well as monarchs who ruled in later periods such as Aktisanes (65), Aspelta (118), Harsiotef (119), Nastasen (120), Arakamani (138) and Arqamani (145). There are also six queens given the name "Kandake" on the list (110, 135, 137, 144, 162, 169).

The Axumite empire at its maximum extent of influence.

Louis J. Morié's Histoire de l'Éthiopie served as the main source for these Egyptian and Nubian monarchs and the regnal order they are presented in on the 1922 Ethiopian regnal list. However, there are other reasons why the author of this regnal list felt that the inclusion of Egyptian and Nubian monarchs was appropriate for a historical outline of Ethiopia/Abyssinia. One reason is due to the Axumite conquest of Meroë, the last capital of the Kingdom of Kush, by King Ezana in c. 325 AD. It was from this point onward that the Axumites began referring to themselves as "Ethiopians", the Greco-Roman term previously used largely for the Kushites. Following this, the inhabitants of Axum (modern-day Ethiopia and Eritrea) were able to claim lineage from the "Ethiopians" or "Aethiopians" mentioned in the Bible who were actually Kushites. Professor of Anthropology Carolyn Fluehr-Lobban believed the inclusion of Kushite rulers on the 1922 regnal list suggests that the traditions of ancient Nubia were considered culturally compatible with those of Axum. Makeda, the Biblical Queen of Sheba, was referred to as "Candace" or "Queen Mother" in the Kebra Nagast, suggesting a cultural connection between Ethiopia and the ancient kingdom of Kush. Portuguese missionary Francisco Álvares, who travelled to Ethiopia in 1520, recorded one Ethiopian tradition which claimed that Yeha was "the favourite residence of Queen Candace, when she honoured the country with her presence".

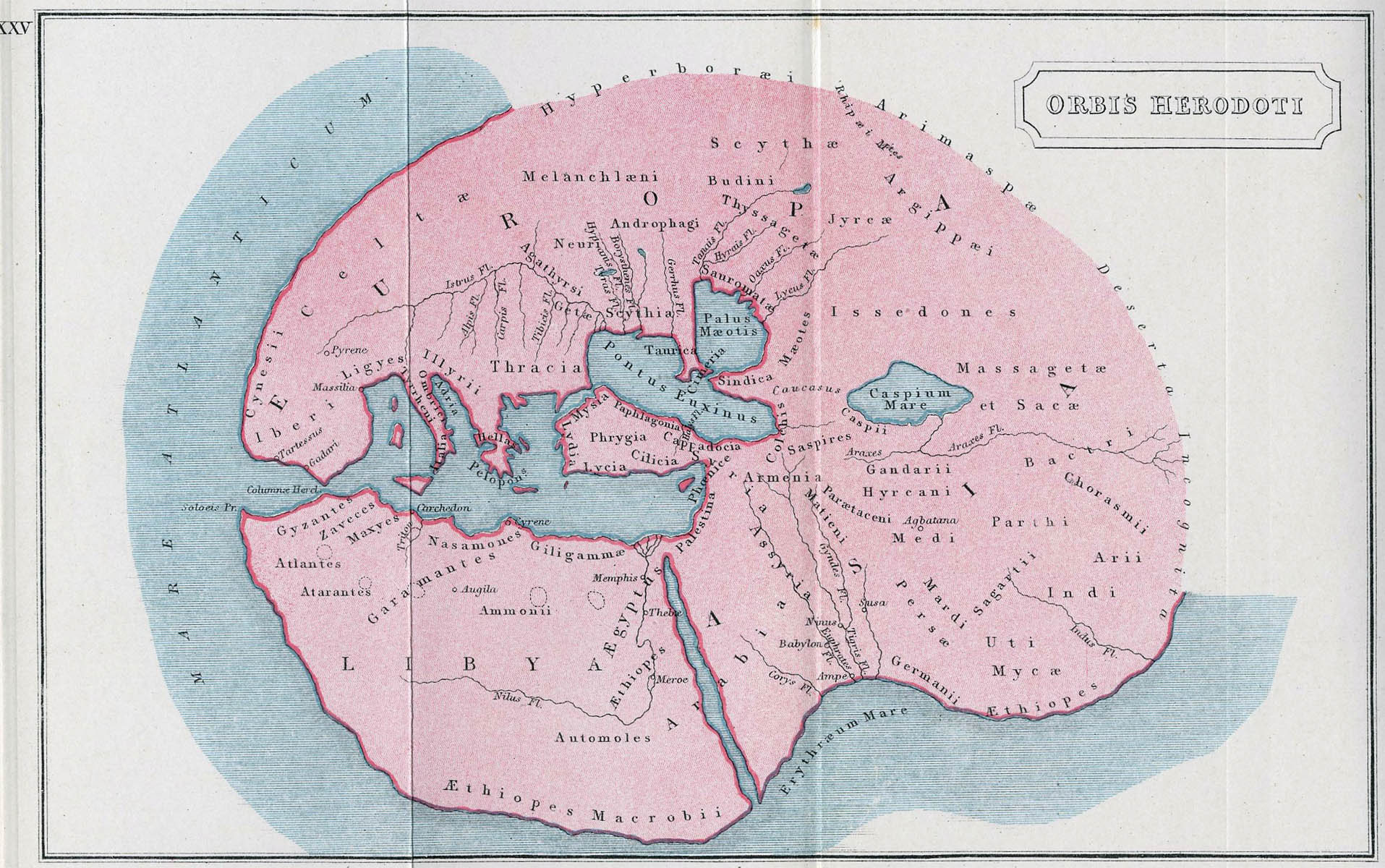
The world according to Herodotus. He defined "Aethiopes" as being south of Egypt and including Meroe.

E. A. Wallis Budge theorized that one of the reasons why the name "Ethiopia" was applied to Abyssinia was because Syrian monks identified Kush and Nubia with Abyssinia when translating the Bible from Greek to Ge'ez. Budge further noted that translators of the Bible into Greek identified Kush with Ethiopia and this was carried over into the translation from Greek to Ge'ez. Louis J. Morié likewise believed the adoption of the word "Ethiopia" by the Abyssinians was due to their desire to search for their origins in the Bible and coming across the word "Ethiopia" in Greek translations. Historian Adam Simmons noted the 3rd century Greek translation of the Bible translated the Hebrew toponym "Kūš" into "Aethiopia". He argued that Abyssinia did not cement its "Ethiopian" identity until the translation of the Kebra Nagast from Arabic to Ge'ez during the reign of Amda Seyon I (r. 1314–1344).

E. A. Wallis Budge argued that the "Ethiopians" mentioned in ancient Greek writings were unlikely to be the Abyssinians and were far more likely to be the Nubians of Meroë. He believed the native name of the region around Axum was "Habesh" from which "Abyssinia" is derived, and originating in the name of the Habasha tribe from southern Arabia. He did note, however, that the modern-day people of the region did not like this term and preferred the name "Ethiopia" because of its association with the Kingdom of Kush. The Kushites are not known to have used the term "Ethiopian" to refer to themselves, however, Silko, the first Christian Nubian king of Nobatia, in the early sixth century, described himself as "Chieftain of the Nobadae and of all the Ethiopians". The earliest known Greek writings that mention "Aethiopians" date to the 8th century BC, in the writings of Homer and Hesiod. Herodotus, in his work Histories (c. 430 BC), defined "Aethiopia" as beginning at the island of Elephantine and including all land south of Egypt, with the capital being Meroe. This geographical definition confirms that in ancient times the term "Aethiopia" was commonly used to refer to Nubia and the Kingdom of Kush rather than modern-day Ethiopia. The earliest known writer to use the name "Ethiopia" for the region of the Kingdom of Axum was Philostorgius in c. 440 AD.

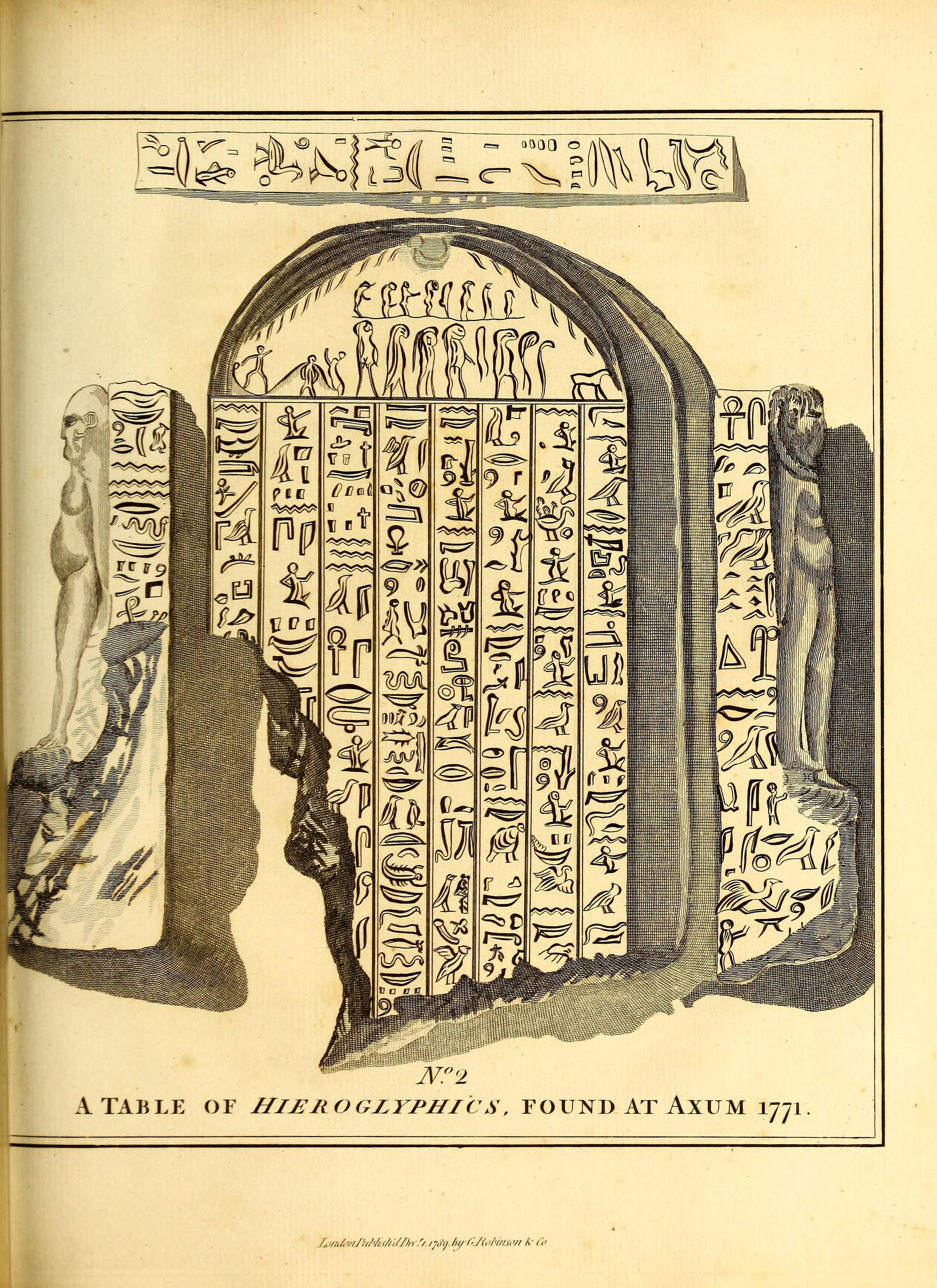
Stele with Egyptian hieroglyphs found in Axum, as shown in James Bruce's Travels to Discover the Source of the Nile

Scottish traveller James Bruce, in his multi-volume work Travels to Discover the Source of the Nile included a drawing of a stele found in Axum and brought back to Gondar by the Ethiopian emperor. The stele had carved figures of Egyptian gods and was inscribed with hieroglyphs. E. A. Wallis Budge believed the stele to be a "Cippi of Horus" which were placed in homes and temples to keep evil spirits away. He noted that these date from the end of the Twenty-sixth Dynasty (c. 664–525 BC) onwards. Budge believed this was proof of contacts between Egypt and Axum in the early 4th century BC. Archaeological excavations in the Kassala region have also revealed direct contact with Pharaonic Egypt. Some tombs excavated in the Yeha region, the likely capital of the Dʿmt kingdom, contained imported albastron dated to c. 770–404 BC, which had a Napatan or Egyptian origin.

Budge noted that none of the Egyptian and Kushite kings on the 1922 list appear on other known regnal lists from Ethiopia. He believed that contemporary Ethiopian priests had been "reading a modern European History of Egypt" and had incorporated in the regnal list Egyptian pharaohs who had "laid Nubia and other parts of the Sudan under tribute", as well as the names of various Kushite kings and Priest kings. To support his argument, he stated that while the names of Abyssinian kings have meanings, the names of Egyptian kings would be meaningless if translated into the Ethiopian language. Manfred Kropp likewise noted that no Ethiopian manuscript before the 1922 regnal list included names of monarchs resembling those used by Egyptian rulers. A comparison of known Ethiopian regnal lists shows that most of the monarchs on the 1922 list with Egyptian or Nubian names do not have these elements in their names on other regnal lists (see Regnal lists of Ethiopia). For example, the 102nd king on Tafari's list, Amen Hotep Zagdur, only appears as "Zagdur" on earlier regnal lists. The next king, Aksumay Ramissu, is only known as "Aksumay" on earlier lists, while the 106th king, Abralyus Wiyankihi II, was previously only known as "Abralyus". The 111th king, Tsawi Terhak Warada Nagash, is a combination of multiple kings. One king named "Sawe" or "Za Tsawe" is listed as the fifth king following Menelik I according to some lists, while another king named "Warada Nagash" is named as the eighth king following Menelik I on different lists. No known list includes both kings; the 1922 list combined the two different kings as a single entry, with the addition of the name "Terhak", to be equated with the Kushite Pharaoh Taharqa, who otherwise does not appear on earlier Ethiopian regnal lists. Also missing from earlier Ethiopian regnal lists are the "Kandake" queens.

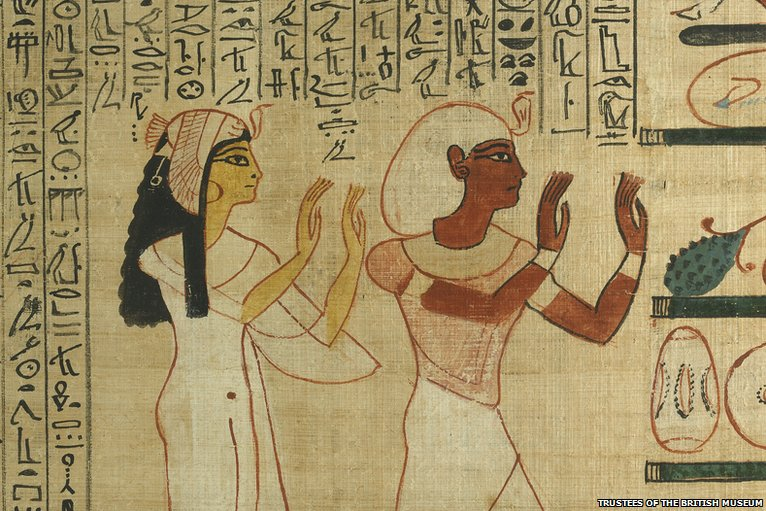
Herihor, High Priest of Amun of Upper Egypt between c. 1080 and 1074 BC, shown here with wife Nodjmet

The inclusion of the High Priests of Amun who ruled Upper Egypt between c. 1080 and 943 BC can be traced directly to Morié's Histoire de l'Éthiopie and to contemporary Egyptology. The association between these Egyptian High Priests and Aethiopia was particularly strong in European Egyptological writings in the late 19th and early 20th centuries. During this period, several major Egyptologists (such as Heinrich Brugsch, James Breasted and George Reisner) believed that the rise of the Kush kingdom was due to the influence of the High Priests of Amun moving into Nubia towards the end of the Twentieth Dynasty because of political conflict arising at the end of the New Kingdom. Brugsch in particular entertained the idea that the early Kushite kings were lineal descendants of the priests from Egypt, though Breasted explicitly rejected this. Later Egyptologists A. J. Arkell and Walter Emery theorized that a priestly "government in exile" had influenced the Kushite kingdom. E. A. Wallis Budge agreed with these ideas and suggested that the High Priests of Amun moved south to Nubia due to the rise of the Libyan pharaohs in Lower Egypt, and consolidated their high position by intermarrying with Nubian women. Budge further theorised that the name of the Nubian pharaoh Piye, or "Piankhi," was derived from that of the High Priest of Amun Piankh, and that he was possibly a descendant of Piankh. Such ideas about the Kushite monarchy originating from this specific line of priests are now considered outdated. Still, the popularity of these theories in the early 20th century helps explain their inclusion, in almost exact chronological order, in the 1922 Ethiopian regnal list.

==== Greek sources ====
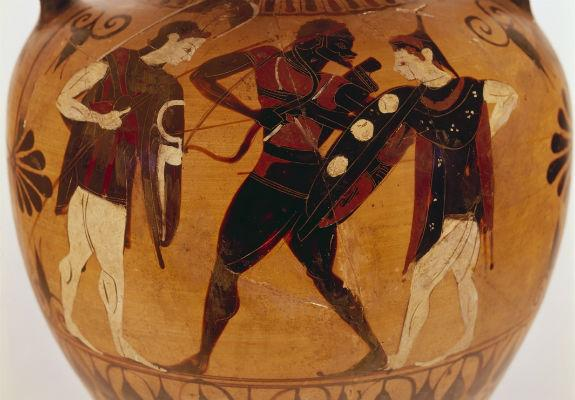
A black archer whose feet and legs face left, upper body facing right, flanked by two Amazones. Mayence identifies the black person with Memnon, whereas Beazley and Bothmer regard him as an attendant of Memnon.

Several figures from Greek mythology are included on the regnal list, in most cases because they are described as "Aethiopian" in ancient sources. Louis J. Morié's Histoire de l'Éthiopie is largely responsible for their inclusion. His book included Memnon, a mythical king of "Aethiopia" who fought in the Trojan War, his father Tithonus, and his brother Emathion, who are all included on the regnal list under the names Amen Emhat II (83), Titon Satiyo (81), and Hermantu (82). Cassiopeia was also mentioned in Morié's book, but he confusingly uses the name for two different women. This results in the 1922 regnal list including Cassiopeia under the name of Kasiyope (49) while her husband Cepheus is listed four hundred years later under the name Kefe (71).

The list also included figures not part of Morié's narrative, indicating that the author drew on other sources to compile the regnal list. Diodorus's work (including Bibliotheca Historia) influenced the inclusion of the "Aethiopian" king Actisanes (65) and the Egyptian king Mandes (66). Herodotus' Histories also had some influence on the regnal list, with the various names of rulers being re-used for "Ethiopian" monarchs, such as Nitocris (162), Proteus (67), Sabakon (122), Apries (127). Manetho's Aegyptiaca is another source for certain names on the regnal list, such as Sebikos (123), Tarakos (125) and Sabakon (122).

=== Conflict with other Ethiopian traditions ===
The list occasionally contradicts other Ethiopian traditions. One example is King Angabo I, who is placed in the middle of the Ag'azyan dynasty on this list, but in earlier traditions was considered the founder of a new dynasty. In both cases the dating is given as the 14th century BC. E. A. Wallis Budge noted that there were differing versions of the chronological order of the Ethiopian kings, with some lists stating that a king named Aithiopis was the first to rule, while other lists claim that the first king was Adam. Tafari's list instead begins with Aram.

=== Responses to the regnal list ===
Contemporary historian Manfred Kropp described the regnal list as an artfully woven document, a rational and scientific attempt by an educated Ethiopian in the early 20th century to reconcile Ethiopia's historical knowledge. Kropp noted that the regnal list has often been viewed by historians as little more than an example of a vague notion of historical tradition in north-east Africa. He added that the methods and sources used by the list's author remain unclear. Kropp further stated that despite some rulers' names having astonishing similarities to those of Egyptian and Meroitic/Kushite rulers, there has been little attempt to critically examine the regnal list in relation to other Ethiopian sources. He noted that Tafari's regnal list was the first Ethiopian regnal list to attempt to provide the names of kings from the 970th year of the world's creation onwards, without any chronological gaps. In particular, it was the first Ethiopian regnal list to consistently fill in all dates from the time of Solomon to the Zagwe dynasty. Kropp felt that the regnal list resulted from the incorporation of non-native traditions of "Aethiopia" into native Ethiopian history.

Egyptologist E. A. Wallis Budge (1857–1934) was dismissive of the claims of great antiquity made by the Abyssinians, whom he described as having a "passionate desire to be considered a very ancient nation", which had been aided by the "vivid imagination of their scribes" who borrowed traditions from the Semites (such as Yamanites, Himyarites and Hebrews) and modified them to "suit [their] aspirations". He noted the lack of pre-Christian regnal lists and believed there was no 'kingdom' of Abyssinia/Ethiopia until the time of king Zoskales (c. 200 AD). Budge additionally noted that all extant manuscripts date to the 17th–19th centuries and believed that any regnal lists found in them originated from Arab and Coptic writers. Budge felt the 1922 regnal list "proves" that "almost all kings of Abyssinia were of Asiatic origin" and descended from "Southern or Northern Semites" before the reign of Yekuno Amlak. However, native Ethiopian rule before Yekuno Amlak is evidenced by the kingdoms of D'mt (c. 980–400 BC) and Aksum (c. 150 BC–960 AD), as well as by the rule of the Zagwe dynasty.

The Geographical Journal reviewed In the Country of the Blue Nile in 1928, and noted the regnal list contained "many more names [...] than in previously published lists" and was "evidently a careful compilation" which helped to "clear up the tangled skein of Ethiopian history". However, the reviewer did also notice that it "[contained] discrepancies" which Rey "[made] no attempt to clear up". The reviewer pointed to how king Dil Na'od is said to have reigned for 10 years from 910 to 920; yet travel writer James Bruce previously stated the deposition of this dynasty occurred in 960, 40 years later. The reviewer did admit, however, that Egyptologist Henry Salt's dating of this event to 925 may have had "more reason" to it compared to Bruce's dating, considering that Tafari's regnal list seemingly backs up Salt's dating.

The Washington Post made use of the regnal list when reporting on the coronation of Haile Selassie in 1930. The paper reported that Selassie would become "the 336th sovereign of [the Ethiopian] empire" which was "founded in the ninety-seventh [sic] year after the creation of the world" and as such his reign would begin in "the 6,460th year of the reign of the Ethiopian dynasty". (Note: It is unclear how the newspaper numbered Haile Selassie 336th in succession order, but this could be achieved by counting the 313 numbered monarchs of Tafari's list, and combining this with the latter portion of Taye Gabra Mariam's list, which names 9 regents of the Zemene Mesafint, 8 kings of Shewa, and 6 emperors from Tewodros II to Zewditu.) The newspaper noted that Adam was no longer "claimed by Ethiopians as the original ancestor of the kings of Ethiopia" and instead the modern Abyssinians claimed their first king was "Ori, or Aram, the son of Shem". The same article mentioned the 531-year gap between the Flood and the fall of the Tower of Babel; during that time, "42 different Ethiopian sovereigns ruled Africa", though the regnal list itself did not provide any names for this time period.

== Regnal list ==
=== Notes ===
Dating system: The regnal list uses the Ethiopian Calendar. This calendar is 8 years behind the Gregorian calendar from January 1 to September 10 and 7 years behind from September 11 to December 31.

Names and regnal numbering: Exact names of monarchs can differ between versions of the list, with the versions of the list written by Alaqa Taye Gabra Mariam and Heruy Wolde Selassie occasionally having expanded or additional names for some rulers compared to those on the list quoted by Charles F. Rey. This affects the regnal numbering of monarchs, which is sometimes incorrect on certain versions of the list. Transliteration of names from Geʽez to English has also resulted in some variation in the exact spellings of names. (Note: Examples of this include "Ayba" (አይባ) and "Ayibe" (አይቤ), "Nikti" (ኒክቲ) and "Nekate" (ነካቲ), "Piyankihi" (ፒያንኪሂ) and "Wiyankihi" (ዊያንኪሂ), "Salayba" (ሰላይባ) and "Saladoba" (ሰላዶባ) and "Setwa" (ሲትዋ) and "Sutuwa" (ሱቱዋ).) The following list combines names across different versions of the regnal list and uses adjusted spellings of names for consistency.

Multiple names: Many monarchs have multiple names listed, similar to the way that the Emperors of Ethiopia who reigned from 1270 to 1974 often chose a throne name upon their accession to the throne. In the few cases where the throne name is specified, it is the second name of that monarch. (Note: For example, Tafari's list stated that for the 200th monarch, Ahywa Sofya, her regnal name is Sofya. The same list states that Mara Takla Haymanot's regnal name was Zagwe. Taye Gabra Mariam's list states that for the 167th monarch, Sartu Tsenfa Asagad, it is "Tsenfa Asagad" that is his regnal name.) Exceptions to this are the emperors Iyasu I and Iyasu II, who have their throne names placed before birth names. The tables below list the names of each monarch based on the order in which they are presented on the original regnal list.

=== Tribe of Ori or Aram ===
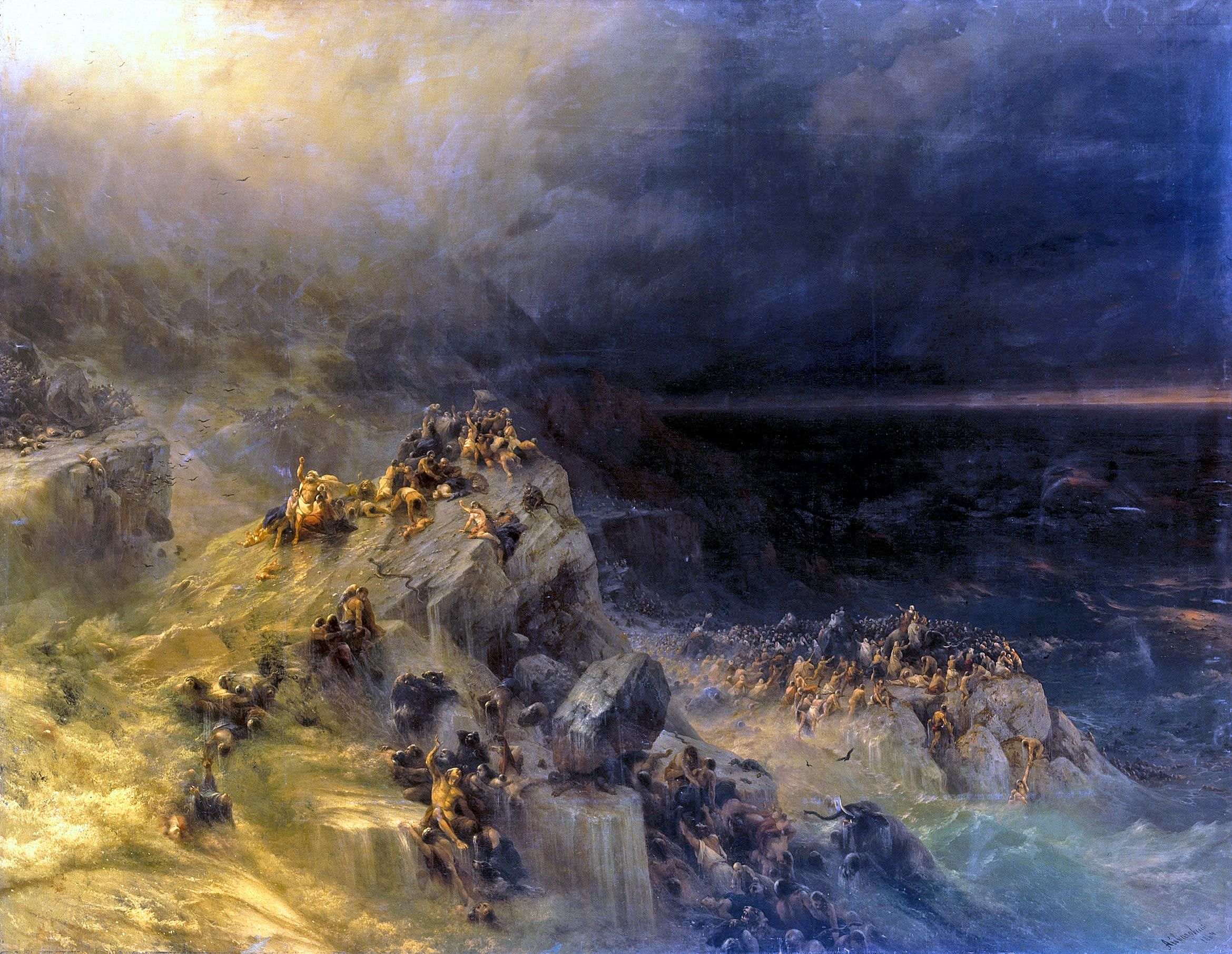
Deluge by Ivan Aivazovsky (1864)

"Tribe or Posterity of Ori or Aram".

Taye Gabra Mariam's History of the People of Ethiopia gives the following information on the "Tribe of Orit":

- "Those who before all others left Asia earliest and who entered Ethiopia and occupied the country are called the tribe of Orit. Their father [...] was one of the sons of Adam, called Ori or Aram. He and his line, twenty-one kings, ruled in Ethiopia from the year [970] of the world until 2256 of the world [...] During the time of their last King, Soliman Tagi, in the era of Noah, they were wiped out and brought to an end by the devastating flood."

The first dynasty of this list consists of 21 monarchs who ruled before the Biblical "Great Flood". This dynasty is legendary and drawn from a list of pre-Flood kings of Egypt found in medieval Coptic and Arabic texts. Louis J. Morié recorded a list of 19 monarchs in his 1904 book Histoire de L'Éthiopie. Morié noted that the kings were supposed to be rulers of Egypt, but he personally believed they had actually ruled "Ethiopia" (i.e., Nubia). He pointed to a story of the third king, Gankam, who had a palace built beyond the Equator at the Mountains of the Moon, as proof that these kings resided in Aethiopia. The kings of this dynasty are described as Priest-kings in Coptic tradition and were called the "Soleyman" dynasty. While the original Coptic tradition called the first king "Aram", in reference to the son of Shem of the same name, this regnal list calls the king "Ori or Aram". The name "Ori" may have originated from Morié's claim that this dynasty was called the "Aurites", and that Aram had inspired the name of his country, which was called "Aurie" or "Aeria".

Alaqa Taye Gabra Mariam confirmed that "Murtad and the Azurotet of Egypt" were useful sources for understanding ancient history, referring to Murtada ibn al-Afif's 12th-century text The Prodiges of Egypt. While different from Morié's list, Murtada's list can be seen as an earlier incarnation of the same line of legendary kings. Murtada's list is based on the earlier text Akhbar al-zaman (The History of Time) dated to the mid-10th to mid-12th centuries.

The only rulers of this dynasty who do not appear in the Coptic Antediluvian regnal list are "Senefrou" and "Assa", whom E. A. Wallis Budge believed to be the historical Egyptian pharaohs Sneferu and Djedkare Isesi.

Heruy Wolde Selassie ignored this dynasty on his version of the regnal list. Ethiopian historian Fisseha Yaze Kassa, in his book Ethiopia's 5,000-year history, completely omitted this dynasty and instead begins with the Ham/Kam dynasty.

E. A. Wallis Budge believed that the regnal list began with Aram rather than Ham because contemporary Ethiopians wanted to distance themselves from the Curse of Ham. The medieval Ethiopian text Kebra Nagast stated that "God decreed sovereignty for the seed of Shem, and slavery for the seed of Ham".

Key for sources
B	Indicates name originated from the Bible.
C	Indicates name originated from Coptic literature.
E	Indicates name originated from contemporary Egyptology.
M	Indicates name originated from Louis J. Morié's Histoire de L'Éthiopie.
R	Indicates name originated from earlier regnal lists, as categorised by Carlo Conti Rossini.

1922 regnal list					Sources	Notes
No.	Name(s)	Reign length	Reign dates		Sources	Notes
No.	Name(s)	Reign length	E.C.	A.M.	Sources	Notes
1	Ori I Aram I	60 years	4530–4470 BC	970–1030	B • C • M • R	Son of Adam in Coptic tradition.; Shares same name as the son of Shem in Biblical tradition.; Known as Mesram (i.e., Mizraim/Egypt) by Akhbar al-zaman and The Prodigies of Egypt.; The name Ori previously only appeared on list H, which stated he reigned for 2 years and 9 months.
2	Gariak I	66 years	4470–4404 BC	1030–1096	C • M	Son of Ori I.; Not mentioned in Akhbar al-zaman or The Prodiges of Egypt.
3	Gannkam	83 years	4404–4321 BC	1096–1179	C • M	Descendant of Gariak I, according to Morié.; Son of Mesram/Aram I according to The Prodiges of Egypt.; Known as Anqam the Priest in Akhbar al-zaman.; Built a palace out of iron and bronze at the foot of the Mountains of the Moon after foreseeing the Great Flood and its future destruction.
4	Borsa (Queen)	67 years	4321–4254 BC	1179–1246	C • M	Mentioned in The Prodiges of Egypt, but not as part of the line of succession of kings.; Known as Kuniah the Priestess in Akhbar al-zaman.
5	Gariak II	60 years	4254–4194 BC	1246–1306	C • M	Son of Gannkam.; Known as Arbaq in Akhbar al-zaman.
6	Djan I	80 years	4194–4114 BC	1306–1386	C • M	Son of Gariak II.; Known as Lujim in Akhbar al-zaman and Louchanam in The Prodigies of Egypt.; "Djan" is an old Ethiopian title meaning "chief", "king" or "royalty".
7	Djan II	60 years	4114–4054 BC	1386–1446	C • M	Known as Khaslim in Akhbar al-zaman and Chasalim in The Prodigies of Egypt.; Son of Djan I.
8	Senefrou	20 years	4054–4034 BC	1446–1466	E	Historical pharaoh Sneferu who raided Nubia during his reign.
9	Zeenabzamin	58 years	4034–3976 BC	1466–1524	C • M	Previously known as "Zeyn al-Zaman", which means "Ornament of the century".; Not mentioned in Akhbar al-zaman or The Prodiges of Egypt.
10	Sahlan	60 years	3976–3916 BC	1524–1584	C • M	Known as Harsal in Akhbar al-zaman and The Prodigies of Egypt.; Son of Chasalim/Djan II according to Murtada ibn al-'Afif.
11	Elaryan	80 years	3916–3836 BC	1584–1664	C • M	Originally known as "El-Rian" according to Morié.; Known as Qadrashan, son of Harsla/Sahlan, in Akhbar al-zaman.; Possibly the king called Jadousac, son of Harsal/Sahlan, mentioned in The Prodigies of Egypt.
12	Nimroud	60 years	3836–3776 BC	1664–1724	C • M	Not to be confused with the Biblical figure Nimrod.; His original name was Youssef, and he was a minister to King Elaryan according to Morié.; Known as Shamrud in Akhbar al-zaman and Semrod in The Prodigies of Egypt.; Son of Harsal/Sahlan according to Akhbar al-zaman.; Two kings named "Josedon" and "Sariac" reigned between this king and Saloug according to The Prodigies of Egypt. These kings are omitted from this regnal list.
13	Eylouka (Queen)	45 years	3776–3731 BC	1724–1769	C • M	Originally known as Daluka.; Not mentioned in Akhbar al-zaman, but this text states that an unnamed wife succeeded Shamrud/Nimroud as regent for their son Tusidun for six years.
14	Saloug	30 years	3731–3701 BC	1769–1799	C • M	Known as Sahluq in Akhbar al-zaman and Sahalouc in The Prodigies of Egypt.; Two kings named "Tusidun" and "Sarbaq" reigned between Shamrud/Nimroud, and this king, according to Akhbar al-zaman. Neither of these kings is mentioned on this list.; Originally the 34th ruler of this dynasty in Coptic tradition according to Morié.
15	Kharid	72 years	3701–3629 BC	1799–1871	C • M	Originally known as Surid.; Eldest son of Saloug according to Morié.; Reigned 390 years before the Flood in Coptic tradition. Reigned 385 years before the Flood on this list.
16	Hogeb	100 years	3629–3529 BC	1871–1971	C • M	Known as Harjit in Akhbar al-zaman and Hargib in The Prodigies of Egypt.; Son of Kharid/Surid according to Akhbar al-zaman and The Prodigies of Egypt.; Second son of Saloug according to Morié.; Reigned for 99 years according to Akhbar al-zaman.
17	Makaws	70 years	3529–3459 BC	1971–2041	C • M	Known as Menaus in Akhbar al-zaman and in The Prodigies of Egypt.; Reigned for 73 years according to Akhbar al-zaman.; Son of Hogeb/Hargib.
18	Assa	30 years	3459–3429 BC	2041–2071	E	Historical pharaoh Djedkare Isesi, who sent an expedition to the "Land of the Spirits" (Punt) and had a Pygmy brought back from there.
19	Affar	50 years	3429–3379 BC	2071–2121	C • M	Known as Afraus in Akhbar al-zaman and as Ecros in The Prodigies of Egypt.; Son of Milanos/Menaos.; Reigned for 64 years according to Akhbar al-zaman.
20	Milanos	62 years	3379–3317 BC	2121–2183	C • M	Known as Armalinus in Akhbar al-zaman and Ermelinos in The Prodigies of Egypt.; A member of the royal house, but his accession interrupted the father-to-son succession that had occurred up to this point.
21	Soliman; Tehagui	73 years	3317–3244 BC	2183–2256	C • M	Originally the 40th and last ruler of the "Soleyman" dynasty in Coptic tradition.; Known as Faran in both Akhbar al-zaman and The Prodigies of Egypt, in reference to the title Pharaoh.; Cousin of Armalinus/Milanos according to Akhbar al-zaman.; Sent his general "Sourkhrag" and priest "Philemon" to discuss with Noah the worship of God and of idols before the Great Flood.

=== Interregnum ===
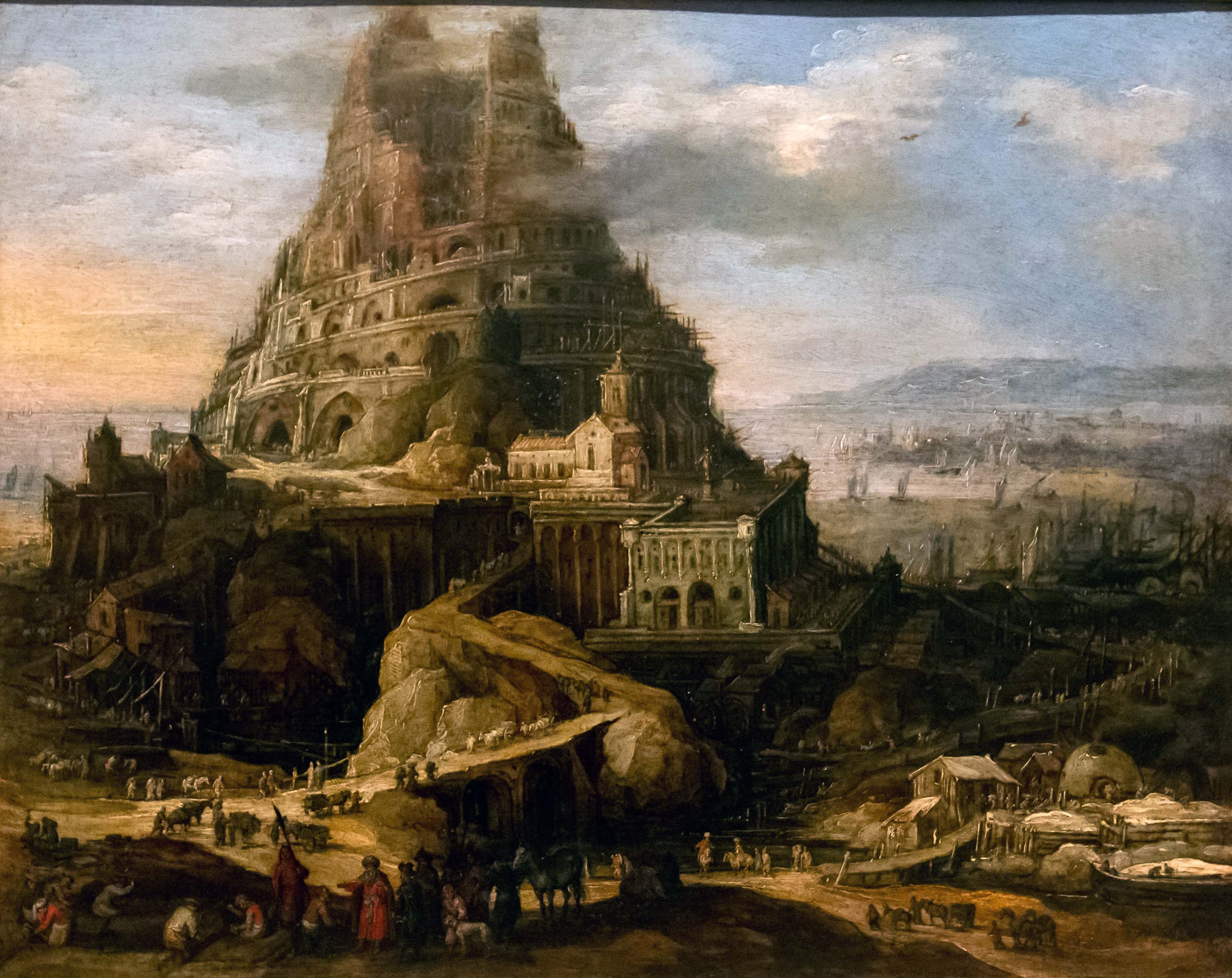
Tower of Babel by Joos de Momper (c. 1595―1605)

"From the Deluge until the fall of the Tower of Babel".

The 531-year period from 3244 BC to 2713 BC (2256–2787 AM) is the only section in this regnal list where no monarchs are named.

Alaqa Taye Gabra Mariam's History of the People of Ethiopia gave the following explanation for this gap:

- "After the extinction of these people [The Tribe of Ori] in the great flood, until the destruction of the tower of Babel and the scattering of people and the differentiation of languages in the year [2787] the entire area and the country of Ethiopia was an empty land without native people. After this the tribe of Kam came and inherited her."

The Tower of Babel was, according to the Bible, built by humans in Shinar at a time when humanity spoke a single language. The tower was intended to reach the sky, but this angered God, who confounded their speech and made them unable to understand each other, and caused humanity to be scattered across the world. This story serves as an origin myth to explain why so many different languages are spoken around the world.

Some older Ethiopian regnal lists state that the monarchs who reigned between the Great Flood and the fall of the Tower of Babel were pagans, idolaters, and worshippers of the "serpent", and thus were not worthy of being named.

=== Tribe of Kam ===
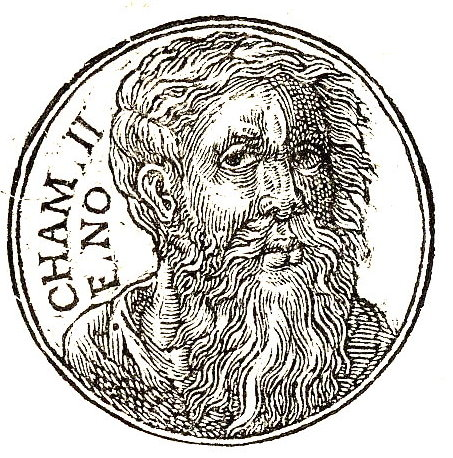
1553 drawing of Ham by Guillaume Rouillé

"Sovereignty of the Tribe of Kam after the fall of the Tower of Babel".

Taye Gabra Mariam's History of the People of Ethiopia gave the following background for the tribe of Kam or "Kusa":

- "Kam came to Ethiopia crossing the Bab il-Mandäb from Asia. This was in the year 2787 of the world, in the 2,713th year before the birth of our Lord Jesus Christ."
- "Kam ruled Ethiopia for 78 years and, returning to Asia intending to seize Syria, he fought against the sons of Sem and died in battle. But his sons set the eldest brother Kugan to rule over themselves, and inherited Ethiopia. The tribe of Kam with their descendants, 25 kings in all, reigned and ruled Ethiopia for [728] years from 2787 to the year 3515 of the world."

This dynasty begins with Ham, the second son of the Biblical prophet Noah, whose descendants, according to the Bible, populated the African continent and adjoining parts of Asia. Ham was the father of Cush (Kush/Nubia), Mizraim (Egypt), Canaan (Levant) and Put (Libya or Punt).

Taye's statement that Kam was killed in battle while attempting to invade Syria was inspired by Louis J. Morié's Histoire de L'Éthiopie, in which he claimed that Kam/Ham was killed at the age of 576 in a battle against the Assyrians after attempting to invade their territories. Morié also claimed that Kam ruled over Upper Egypt and Aethiopia and his name inspired the ancient name of Egypt, Kmt. According to Heruy Wolde Selassie's book Wazema, the Kamites originated from the Middle East and conquered Axum, Meroe, Egypt and North Africa. This claim also likely originated from Louis J. Morié, who stated that Ham arrived in Aethiopia after the Deluge and his descendants ruled over different parts of Aethiopia and Egypt.

Some earlier Ethiopian traditions presented a very different line of kings descending from Ham. E. A. Wallis Budge stated that in his time, there was a common belief in Ethiopia that the people were descended from Ham, his son Cush, and Cush's son Ethiopis, who is not named in the Bible, and from whom the country of Ethiopia gets its name. Some regnal lists explicitly state that the names "Ethiopia" and "Axum" come from descendants of Ham that are not named in the Bible.

This dynasty has several rulers whose names are inspired by ancient Egyptian names, such as Amen, Horkam, and Ramenpahte. E. A. Wallis Budge theorized that the name of the first ruler, Kam, was actually a reference to "k.mt", the name of Egypt before the Greco-Roman period. Peter Truhart believed this king's inclusion on the regnal list represented Egyptian contacts with Punt (which he identifies with modern-day Ethiopia) that took place around 3000 BC.

Ethiopian historian Fisseha Yaze Kassa's book Ethiopia's 5,000-year history begins this dynasty with Noah and omits Habassi, but otherwise has a similar line of kings as this list. Heruy Wolde Selassie omitted the first three rulers of this dynasty in his book Wazema and begins the dynasty with Sebtah in 2545 BC. Peter Truhart, in his book Regents of Nations, dated the monarchs of this dynasty to 2585–1930 BC and stated that the capital during this period was called Mazez. He identified Kout as the first king of this dynasty instead of Kam. Truhart called the monarchs from Kout to Lakniduga the "Dynasty of Kush" based at Mazez and stated they ruled from 2585 to 2145 BC, while the monarchs from Manturay to Piori I are listed as the "Kings of Ethiopia and Meroe" who ruled from 2145 to 1930 BC.

According to Taye Gabra Mariam, the Kam or "Kusa" tribe was driven from the highlands of Ethiopia to the lowlands by the Ag'azyan dynasty that ruled Ethiopia after them.

Heruy Wolde Selassie's version of the regnal list includes additional or alternate names for some monarchs. Some of these names are taken from Ethiopian regnal lists.

Key for sources
A	Indicates name originated from Abyssinian tradition.
B	Indicates name originated from the Bible.
E	Indicates name originated from contemporary Egyptology.
G	Indicates name originated from Greek mythology.
M	Indicates name originated from Louis J. Morié's Histoire de L'Éthiopie.
R	Indicates name appeared on earlier regnal lists, as categorised by Carlo Conti Rossini.

1922 regnal list					Sources	Notes
No.	Name(s)	Reign length	Reign dates		Sources	Notes
No.	Name(s)	Reign length	E.C.	A.M.	Sources	Notes
22	Kam; Kusa	78 years	2713–2635 BC	2787–2865	A • B • M • R	Biblical figure Ham, who was the ancestor the Aethiopians.; Appears on a regnal list recorded by E. A. Wallis Budge that was not included in Rossini's categorisations of all lists.; Ethiopian historian Fisseha Yaze Kassa provided alternate reign dates for this king of 3500–2787 BC (713 years) and listed Noah as the first king of this dynasty with reign dates of 3844–3500 BC (344 years).
23	Kout; Kugan	50 years	2635–2585 BC	2865–2915	A • B • M • R	Biblical figure Cush, son of Ham, through whom the people of Aethiopia descend.; Appears on a regnal list recorded by E. A. Wallis Budge that was not included in Rossini's categorisations of all lists.; Often considered to be a representation of the Kingdom of Kush in modern-day Sudan. Some translations of the Bible identify Kush with "Aethiopia", leading to the traditional Ethiopian identification with ancient Kush, as seen throughout this list.; Ethiopian historian Fisseha Yaze Kassa provided alternate reign dates for this king of 2787–2545 BC (242 years).; Founded the city of Axum in Morié's narrative.
24	Habassi	40 years	2585–2545 BC	2915–2955	A • M	Son of Cush/Kout.; Ethiopian sources claim the word "Abyssinia" is derived from the name of this king.; The medieval text Akhbar al-Zaman mentions Habassi (or "Habash") as a son of Cush and ancestor of the Abyssinians.; While many historians link the word "Abyssinia" with the Arabic word "Habesh", this link was rejected by Ethiopian scholar Aleqa Asras Yenesaw.; Ruled in Axum and was the ancestor of the Abyssinians according to Morié's narrative.; Ethiopian historian Fisseha Yaze Kassa omitted this king from his list of monarchs of the Kam dynasty.
25	Sabtah (Note: Heruy Wolde Selassie listed Sabeta as an alternate name for this king.)	30 years	2545–2515 BC	2955–2985	B	Biblical figure Sabtah, son of Cush.; An Ethiopian tradition states that Sebtah was king of Kush and Wurd Bashir was the capital during his reign. This legend states that he travelled to the source of the Nile and built Wurd Bashir with a great wall and nine gates.
26	Elektron	30 years	2515–2485 BC	2985–3015	G?	Name may be inspired by Electryon, king of Tiryns and Mycenae in Greek mythology and descendant of the Aethiopian king and queen Cepheus and Cassiopeia.
27	Neber	30 years	2485–2455 BC	3015–3045	–	Manfred Kropp tentatively suggested this name could be based on Robert Napier, 1st Baron Napier of Magdala, who led the British expedition to Abyssinia in July 1867.
28	Amen I	21 years	2455–2434 BC	3045–3066	E	Name based on Egyptian god Amun.
29	Nehasset Nays; Kasiyope I (Note: Called Kasiyoni by Taye Gabra Mariam. The differences in English transliteration and spelling could be due to the similarity of the Amharic writing of "Kasiyoni" (ካሲዮኒ) and "Kasiyopi" (ካስዮፒ).) (Queen)	30 years	2434–2404 BC	3066–3096	E • M	In Morié's Histoire de L'Éthiopie, Nahaset Nais was a Nubian courtesan who drowned all her lovers in the Red Sea until she married Horkam, who took the throne and had her executed. This name could be based on the ancient Egyptian word "Nehesy" meaning "the Nubian".; Morié uses the name "Kassioppe" as an alternate name for "Asoun", an Aethiopian queen who helped plot the assassination of Osiris with Set.; According to Taye Gabra Mariam, it was during the reign of this queen, in the year 2421 B.C./3079 A.M., that the Sinites, ancestors of the Shanqella tribe, arrived in Ethiopia. The Shanqella lived in highland Ethiopia for 440 years until they were driven to the lowlands by the ancestors of the Ag'azyan people.
30	Horkam (Note: Known as Tarkim on some versions of Heruy Wolde Selassie's list.)	29 years	2404–2375 BC	3096–3125	E • M	In Morié's Histoire de L'Éthiopie this king was a son of Cush and husband of Nehasset Nays.; Name inspired by Egyptian god Horus.; According to Taye Gabra Mariam, it was in the 15th year of this king's reign that Aynar, son of Arwadi ("the Arvadite") came to Ethiopia and was the ancestor of the Qemant tribe. Aynar and his wife Intalan came to Ethiopia due to a famine in Canaan.
31	Saba I	30 years	2375–2345 BC	3125–3155	B • M	Biblical figure Seba, son of Cush.; Son of Horkam in Morié's Histoire de L'Éthiopie. Morié also claimed this king founded the city of "Hasabo", which later became Meroe. This narrative is partially based on Josephus's text Antiquities of the Jews, in which he described Sheba as a walled city in Aethiopia that was renamed Meroe by Cambyses II.; According to Taye Gabra Mariam, it was in the 15th year of this king's reign (2360 B.C./3140 A.M.) that the tribe of Weyto, descended from the Zemarites, entered Ethiopia. They had arrived in Ethiopia due to a famine in Egypt and Sudan.
32	Sofarid	30 years	2345–2315 BC	3155–3185	R	A similarly named king Germa Asfare previously appeared on lists A, B, D, and G.
33	Eskendi (Note: Known as Askndou on Tafari's list. This is likely due to a variation in the reading of the name as either "Eskendi" (እስክንዲ) or "Askendi" (አስኬንዲ).)	25 years	2315–2290 BC	3185–3210	R	This name previously appeared on list C, reigning for 36 or 37 years.
34	Hohey; Satyo I	35 years	2290–2255 BC	3210–3245	R	Satyo previously appeared on lists C and D, reigning for 16 years according to the former.; Hohay previously appears only on the obscure list H, reigning for 16 years.
35	Ahyat (Note: Name written as Adglag on Tafari's version of the list. The difference in name may be due to a particular reading of the Ethiopic letters.)	20 years	2255–2235 BC	3245–3265	R	A similar name Ahywa previously appeared on list C.
36	Adgala I (Note: Known as Adgas on at least one version of Heruy Wolde Selassie's list. This is likely due to a variation in the reading of the name as either "Adgala" (አድጋላ) or "Adgasa" (አድጋሳ).)	30 years	2235–2205 BC	3265–3295	R	Previously appeared on list C, reigning for 10 years and 2, 4, 6 or 7 months, and succeeding Satwa.
37	Lakendun I (Note: Known as Lakniduga on Tafari's list and Bakundon on Heruy Wolde Selassie's list.); Malis I	25 years	2205–2180 BC	3295–3320	R	Malis previously appeared on list C, reigning for 4, 6, or 7 years, succeeding Agba.
38	Manturay; Hakli I (Note: Known as Haqbi on Heruy Wolde Selassie's list. This is likely due to a variation in the reading of the name as either "Hakli" (ሀክሊ) or "Hakabe" (ሀካቤ).)	35 years	2180–2145 BC	3320–3355	E • M • R	Mentioned in Morié's Histoire de L'Éthiopie as the first ruler of Aethiopia to regulate legislation and Solar worship. Morié identified him with the Iranian god Mithra and with the Egyptian god Mentu.; Name inspired by the Egyptian gods Montu and Ra.; Hakali previously appeared on list C, reigning for 13 or 14 years, succeeding Malis.
39	Rakhu; Demahe I	30 years	2145–2115 BC	3355–3385	M • R	Mentioned in Morié's Histoire de L'Éthiopie as the son of "Mentou-Rai". Morié identified this king with Phlegyas, a king of the Lapiths who appears in Greek mythology.; Demahe previously appeared on list C, reigning for 10 years, succeeding Hakli.
40	Sabe I (Note: Known as Sobi on Heruy Wolde Selassie's list. This is likely due to a variation in the reading of the name as either "Sabe" (ሳቤ) or "Sobi" (ሶቢ).)	30 years	2115–2085 BC	3385–3415	B • M	Could be the Biblical figure Sabtechah, a son of Cush, based on the alternate name "Kepheas" given by Morié.; Morié claimed it was during the reign of this king that a Kushite tribe went to Chaldea and lived alongside the Jewish population there. This supposedly was the reason why Tacitus mistakenly claimed that the Jews were descended from the Aethiopians.
41	Azagan I Far'on	30 years	2085–2055 BC	3415–3445	R • E	The name Za Zigen or Zegen previously appeared on list C, reigning for 8 years.; The alternate name "Far'on" is likely meant to refer to the Egyptian title Pharaoh.
42	Sousel I Atozanis	20 years	2055–2035 BC	3445–3465	M	Mentioned in Morié's Histoire de L'Éthiopie as a king of Aethiopia under the name "Snouka Menken", though with "Attozanes" as one of his alternate names.; Morié identified this king with Actisanes, a legendary "Aethiopian" king who is mentioned in Greek writings. Morié claimed that he defeated the last king of the Thirteenth dynasty of Egypt and founded the Fourteenth dynasty, ruling Egypt for 13 years before being expelled by an Egyptian king. This was partially inspired by a narrative told by Diodorus.
43	Amen II; Saweza I	15 years	2035–2020 BC	3465–3480	E • R	Saweza previously appeared on list C, reigning for 1 year.
44	Ramenpahte; Masalne I	20 years	2020–2000 BC	3480–3500	E • M • R	Mentioned in Morié's Histoire de L'Éthiopie as an Aethiopian nobleman who was supposed to marry a daughter of king "Ba-en-Khons", but instead she was taken by the king to be his own wife.; Name based on the throne name of Ramesses I ("Men-peh-ty-re").; Masalni previously appeared only on the obscure list H, reigning for 20 years.
45	Wanuna	3 days	2000 BC	3500	E?	Name possibly based on the Egyptian god Nun.
46	Piori I	15 years	2000–1985 BC	3500–3515	M	Mentioned in Morié's Histoire de L'Éthiopie as the king who ruled at the time of Aethiopia's conquest by the "Hyksos" (the "Ag'azyan Dynasty" of this list).; According to Heruy Wolde Selassie, this king was defeated by Rama of India. This narrative was inspired by Morié's Historie de l'Ethiopie, in which he claimed that Rama had a vast empire stretching across India and Arabia and had defeated the Egyptian Pharaoh. According to Morié, the Ethiopian king, "Poeri I", then became a tributary to Rama.; According to Taye Gabra Mariam's The History of the People of Ethiopia, it was during the reign of this king that the tribes of Saba, Abal, and Ofir left Yemen and settled in Ethiopia.

=== Ag'azyan Dynasty ===
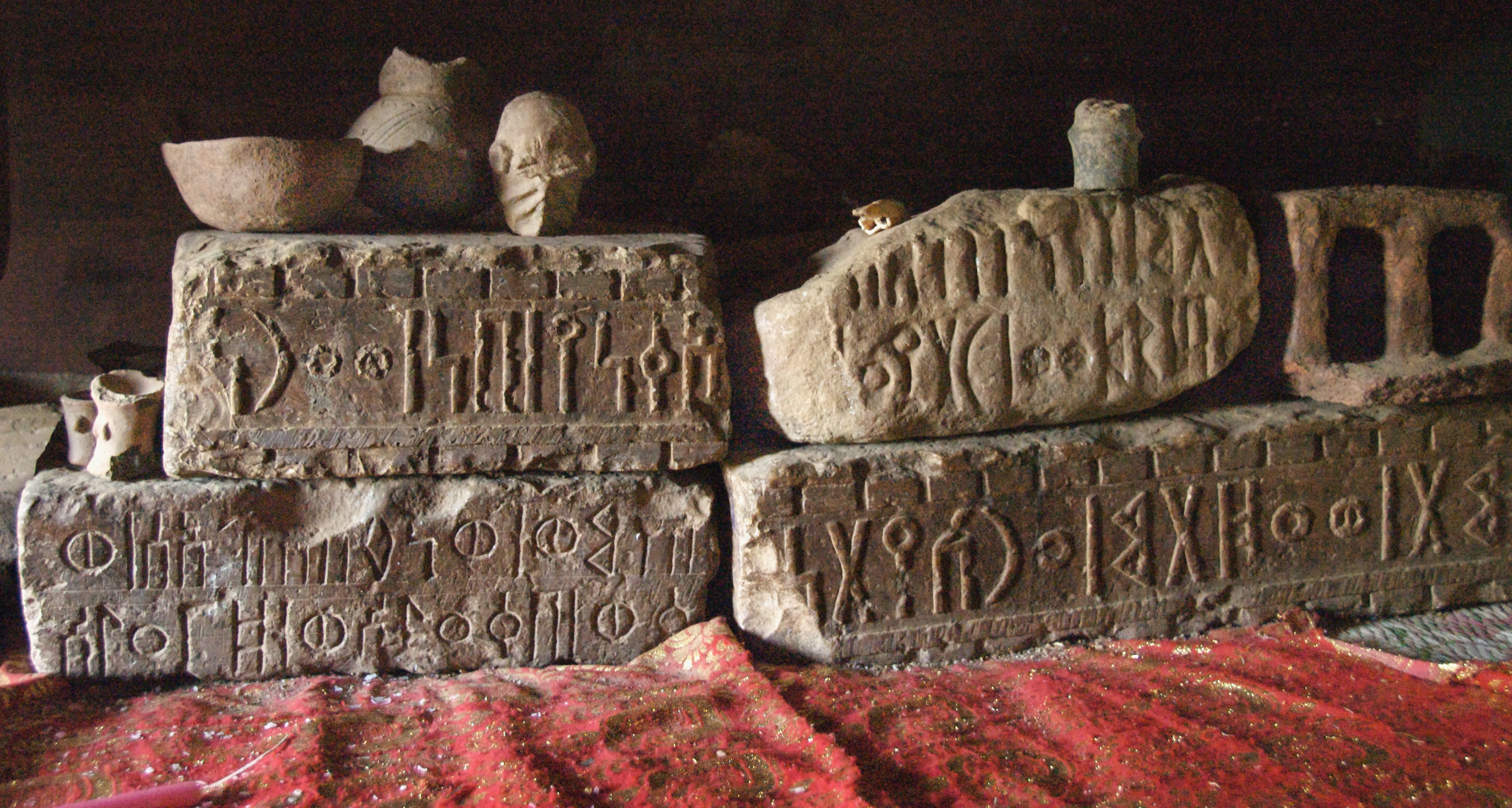
Ancient blocks from Yeha, the likely capital of D'mt, with Sabaean inscriptions

"Agdazyan [sic] (Note: Historian Manfred Kropp noted the word "Agdazyan" is likely a transcribal error and meant to say "Ag'azyan", as the Ethiopian syllable signs da and 'a are relatively easy to confuse with each other.) dynasty of the posterity of the kingdom of Joctan."

Alaqa Taye Gabra Mariam's History of the People of Ethiopia provides the following information on the "Tribe of Yoqt'an":

- "The tribe of Yoqt'an are the grandchildren of Sem. Sem begat fifteen children. Of the fifteen Arfaksad was the third. Arfaksad begat Qaynan; Qaynan begat Sala; Sala begot 'Ebor and 'Ebor begat Falek and Yoqt'an. [...] Yoqt'an begat thirteen children [...] As for their territory, it was in Asia from Mesha to Śīfar and as far as the eastern mountains. (Genesis 10.30).
- When their territory became too small and restricted for them, five of the thirteen children of Yoqt'an, Saba, Awfir, Hawila, Obal, and Abima'el, departed Asia in a great multitude and migrated, journeying to Yemen. When this tribe of Yoqt'an [...] reached Yemen, they paid tribute to the Kusa of Yemen [but] without agreeing to an alliance. Later, however, they saw their weakness and by trickery and other means caused rebellion among the Yemenite Kusa, and, making king a brave and wise one of their own race called 'Yaroba', became the lords of all Yemen. At the end of the reign of the tribe of Kam, the tenth year of the reign of P'i'ori I and the 3,510th year of the world [...] these people were called 'Ag'azyan'. The tribe of Yoqt'an of the tribe of Sem left Yemen in a great multitude and crossed the Bab Il-Mändäb and entered Ethiopia.
- In that period the tribe of Yoqt'an were called at different times by five names. They were called 'Saba', 'Bädäw', 'Irräñña', 'Tigri', and 'Ag'azyan'.
- Ityopp'is was the son of Bulqaya and the grandson of Akhunas known as Saba II. His mother, the daughter of the king of Tut, was called 'Aglä'e'. [...] Ityopp'is I ruled for fifty-six years, from the 3644th to the 3700[th] year of the world, 1856-1800 B.C., and the country was called Ityopp'is after his name. [...] After Ityopp'is died the king's son Lankdun, whose second name was Nowär'ori, succeeded him.
- The sons of Ityopp'is I were five; they are Lankdun, Saba, Noba, Bäläw, and Käläw. The first son Lakndun inherited the kingship, but the other four divided up the land of the state among themselves and held it. Saba is the ancestor of the people who settled in the country now called Tigre; the country used to be called Saba after his name. [...] that the country was called Saba is for Saba II, grandfather of Ityopp'is, and not for Saba, son of Ityopp'is.

The third dynasty of this regnal list is descended from Joktan, grandson of Shem and great-grandson of Noah. According to Genesis 10:7 and 1 Chronicles 1:9, Sheba was a grandson of Cush through Raamah, which provides a link between this Semitic dynasty and the Hamitic dynasty that precedes it. The dynasty ends with the Queen of Sheba, whose name is Makeda in Ethiopian tradition.

This section of the regnal list is heavily influenced by Louis J. Morié's book Histoire de L'Éthiopie, with the majority of monarchs having similar names and order of succession to those found in Morié's book. This results in several monarchs whose names clearly reference ancient Egypt and Kush, most notably the line of High Priests of Amun that reigned near the end of this dynasty. These priests, however, did not rule modern-day Ethiopia, but rather ruled over or had some contact with ancient Nubia and Kush, which is equated with Aethiopia in some translations of the Bible.

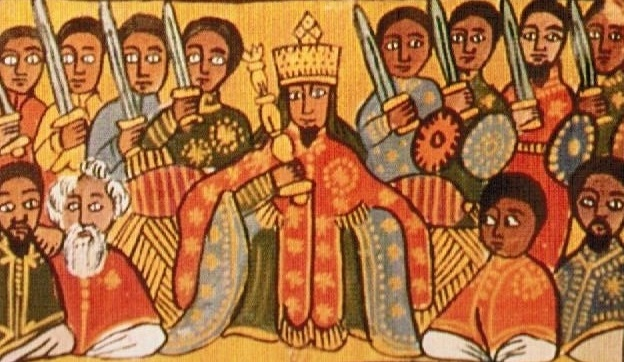
King Angabo, who killed the serpent Arwe.

This section of the list adds monarchs from the Abyssinian tradition to the larger narrative of Morié. These monarchs are Angabo I (no. 74), who founded a new dynasty after killing the serpent king Arwe, and his successors Zagdur I (no. 77), Za Sagado (no. 80), Tawasya (no. 97), and Makeda (no. 98) (See Regnal lists of Ethiopia for more information). There is also another king named Ethiopis, who, according to Ethiopian tradition, is credited with inspiring the name of the country.

The word Ag'azyan means "free" or "to lead to freedom" in Ge'ez. According to both Taye Gabra Mariam's History of the People of Ethiopia and Heruy Wolde Selassie's Wazema, this originated from the liberation of Ethiopia from the rule of the Kamites/Hamites. Three of Joktan's sons divided Ethiopia among themselves. Sheba received Tigray, Obal received Adal and Ophir received Ogaden. E. A. Wallis Budge theorised the term Aga'azyan referred to several tribes who migrated from Arabia to Africa either at the same time as or after the Habashat had migrated. He stated that the word "Ge'ez" had come from "Ag'azyan". The term "Ag'azyan" also refers to the Agʿazi region of the Axumite empire located in modern-day Eastern Tigray and Southern Eritrea.

Sheba is usually considered by historians to have been the south Arabian kingdom of Saba, in an area that later became part of the Aksumite Empire. The Kebra Nagast however specifically states that Sheba was located in Ethiopia. This has led to some historians arguing that Sheba may have been located in a region in Tigray and Eritrea, which was once called "Saba". Stuart Munro-Hay noted that the monarchy of Dʿmt called itself "D'amat and Saba" on its own royal inscriptions from c. 800 BC. American historian Donald N. Levine suggested that Sheba may be linked with the historical region of Shewa, where the modern Ethiopian capital Addis Ababa is located. Additionally, a Sabaean connection with Ethiopia is evidenced by several settlements on the Red Sea coast that emerged around 500 BC and were influenced by Sabaean culture. These people were traders and had their own writing script. Gradually, over time, their culture merged with that of the local people. The Sabaean language was likely the official language of northern Ethiopia during the pre-Axumite period (c. 500 BC to 100 AD). Some historians believe that the kingdom of Dʿmt, located in modern-day Eritrea and Ethiopia, was Sabaean-influenced, possibly due to Sabaean dominance of the Red Sea or due to mixing with the indigenous population.

Josephus wrote that that Achaemenid king Cambyses II conquered the capital of Aethiopia and changed its name from "Saba" to "Meroe". Josephus also stated the Queen of Sheba came from this region and was queen of both Egypt and Ethiopia. This suggests that a belief in a connection between Sheba and Kush was already in place by the 1st century AD. Michael of Tinnis, who compiled the History of the Patriarchs of Alexandria in the 11th century, located Sheba in the country of "al-Habasha" (Abyssinia).

Louis J. Morié placed the early monarchs of this line within the "Hyksos" dynasty in his narrative. He claimed that the Hyksos were known as the "Agaazi" to the Abyssinians, which is likely the reason why they were placed in the "Ag'azyan" dynasty on this regnal list.

Peter Truhart, in his book Regents of Nations, dated the kings from Akbunas Saba II to Lakndun Nowarari to 1930–1730 BC and listed them as a continuation of the line of "Kings of Ethiopia and Meroe" that begun in 2145 BC. Truhart's regnal list then jumps forward and dates the kings from Tutimheb onwards as contemporaries of the Eighteenth and Nineteenth dynasties of Egypt, with a date range of 1552–1185 BC. Truhart also identified modern-day Ethiopia with the Land of Punt. His list however omits the High Priests of Amun from Herihor to Pinedjem II.

The following table uses names from Tafari's, Taye Gabra Mariam's, and Heruy Wolde Selassie's lists.

Key for sources
A	Indicates name originated from Abyssinian tradition.
B	Indicates name originated from the Bible.
E	Indicates name originated from contemporary Egyptology.
G	Indicates name originated from Greek mythology.
M	Indicates name originated from Louis J. Morié's Histoire de L'Éthiopie.
R	Indicates name appeared on earlier regnal lists, as categorised by Carlo Conti Rossini.

1922 regnal list					Sources	Notes
No.	Name(s)	Reign length	Reign dates		Sources	Notes
No.	Name(s)	Reign length	E.C.	A.M.	Sources	Notes
47	Akhunas; Saba II	55 years	1985–1930 BC	3515–3570	E • M	Mentioned in Morié's Histoire de L'Éthiopie as the first king of the "Hyksos" dynasty of Aethiopia under the name Ankhnas. This name was used in 19th century Egyptology to refer to the names Ankhesenpepi and Ankhnesneferibre. Morié believed the name to be a translation of the Greek name Oceanus.
48	Nekate I Kalas I (Note: Known as Kalnis on Tafari's list and Kalenso on Heruy Wolde Selasse's list.)	40 years	1930–1890 BC	3570–3610	M • R	Mentioned in Morié's Histoire de L'Éthiopie as the successor of king "Ankhnas". Morié claimed his wife was Amalthea.; Kalas appears on lists C and D, with 6 years of rule on the former list.
49	Kasiyope II (Queen)	19 years	1890–1871 BC	3610–3629	G • M	Mentioned in Morié's Histoire de L'Éthiopie as the wife of "Sebi II", though not named as one of the reigning monarchs of Aethiopia in his narrative. Morié claims she was one of the 50 Nereids and granddaughter of Oceanus ("Ankhnas" above). This however is a corruption of the story of Cassiopeia, who was not one of the Nereids but claimed she was more beautiful than them. The correct story of Cassiopeia is related in connection with a later king named "Sebi III" (no. 71 on this list).; Morié also claimed this queen was deified as the Syrian and Mesopotamian goddess Anammelech.
50	Sabe II; Ayba I	15 years	1871–1856 BC	3629–3644	M • R	Mentioned in Morié's Histoire de L'Éthiopie as the successor to "Nekhti I". Morié claimed he was deified as Adrammelech. He also claimed he was married to "Kassiopee the Elder", one of the 50 Nereids. This is likely a corruption of the story of Cassiopeia.; According to Taye Gabra Mariam's History of the People of Ethiopia, it was in the reign of this king that the ancestors of the Shinasha people arrived in Ethiopia.; Taye stated this king was the son of a man named "Amin".; Ayba appears on list C, with 16 or 17 years of rule.
51	Etiyopis I	56 years	1856–1800 BC	3644–3700	A • M • R	Ethiopis, a legendary king in Abyssinian/Ethiopian tradition who inspired the name "Ethiopia".; An Ethiopian legend claims that the name "Ethiopia" is derived from the name of king Ethiopis. Likewise, Roman philosopher Pliny the Elder believed that the word "Aethiopia"/"Ethiopia" came from a king named Aethiopis, who was the son of the Roman god Vulcan.; Some Ethiopian traditions trace the word "Ethiopia" to Itan, a Ge'ez word for incense, a reference to the Ethiopian plateau, which has long traded in incense.; One Ethiopian tradition states that Etiyopus was a son of Cush and grandson of Kam.; Another tradition additionally claims that Etiyopus' son was named Aksumawi, who had seven sons named Malayka Aksum, Sum, Nafas, Bagi'o, Kuduki, Akhoro, and Farheba. The names of Etiyopus' son and grandsons are not found on this regnal list.; According to the Book of Axum, this king built Ethiopia's first capital, Mazaber.; According to Taye Gabra Mariam's History of the People of Ethiopia, this king was the son of Bulqaya and Aglä'e, daughter of the king of Tut, and was a grandson of Akhunas Saba II.; Some earlier regnal lists claimed this king was the first to rule Ethiopia.; One tradition states Etiyopus was buried in Aksum and that fire used to burn in his grave.; Mentioned in Morié's Histoire de L'Éthiopie under the name "Atew I (Ethiops)" as the fifth ruler of Aethiopia after the "Hyksos" conquest.
52	Lakendun II; Nowar'Ari (Note: Known as Lakundu Neworos on Taye Gabra Mariam's list and Lakendun Nowär Ori on Heruy Wolde Selassie's list and Taye Gabra Mariam's The History of the People of Ethiopia.)	30 years	1800–1770 BC	3700–3730	M	Son of Etiyopis I.; Mentioned in Morié's Histoire de L'Éthiopie as the next known king of Aethiopia after "Atew I". In the narrative of the king, this king's wife was called Ahhotep I, and he was the father of Ahmose-Nefertari. The 1922 regnal list, however, uses different dating, making this identification impossible.
53	Tutimheb	20 years	1770–1750 BC	3730–3750	M	Mentioned in Morié's Histoire de L'Éthiopie as the successor of "Nower-Ari".; In Morié's narrative this king was defeated by Moses as the head of the army of the Pharaoh. Moses married Tutimheb's daughter Tharbis, following a similar account given by Josephus.
54	Her Hator I Yotor	20 years	1750–1730 BC	3750–3770	E • G • M	Mentioned in Morié's Histoire de L'Éthiopie under the name "At-Hor" as a king who was placed on the throne of Aethiopia by the Pharaoh after the defeat of the previous king. Morié identified him with Jethro of the Bible.; The ancient Greek god Hephaestus was the father of Ethiopis according to Pliny the Elder. The author of the 1922 Ethiopian regnal list may have combined the two separate narratives of Hephaestus and Jethro into one king.; The name "Her Hator" refers to the Egyptian goddess Hathor.
55	Etiyopis II	30 years	1730–1700 BC	3770–3800	G • M	Son of Vulcan (Roman counterpart of Hephaestus) according to Pliny the Elder.; Mentioned in Morié's Histoire de L'Éthiopie under the name "Atew II (Ethiops)". In Morié's narrative, this king's daughter married Danaus, a nomarch of Tanis.
56	Senuka I Menkon	17 years	1700–1683 BC	3800–3817	M	Mentioned in Morié's Histoire de L'Éthiopie under the name "Snouka II Menken (Raskhoperen)".; In Morié's narrative, this king was High Priest of Amun and had support from the Egyptians, who were revolting against Akhenaten and the Atenist religion. He defeated Akhenaten, who had ruled Egypt for 13 years until his death, and afterward allowed Egyptians to choose a native Egyptian as the next king. The 1922 regnal list, however, does not align with Morié's dates.
57	Bonu I	8 years	1683–1675 BC	3817–3825	E • M	Mentioned in Morié's Histoire de L'Éthiopie as the successor of "Snouka II".; Name based on the Egyptian god Bennu.; Also known as "Tsawente Ben(n)u".
58	Mumazes (Queen)	4 years	1675–1671 BC	3825–3829	M	Daughter of Bonu I.; Mentioned in Morié's Histoire de L'Éthiopie as the successor of "Bennou I" and according to Morié was said to ride a chariot dragged by bulls. Her name supposedly meant "Child of water, of the Nile".
59	Aruas	7 months	1671 BC	3829	M	Mentioned in Morié's Histoire de L'Éthiopie as the son and successor of "Moumeses (Moso)". His name supposedly means "Precious Existence".
60	Amen Asro I	30 years	1671–1641 BC	3829–3859	E • M	Mentioned in Morié's Histoire de L'Éthiopie as the successor of "Arouas" and ruler of Egypt for 2 years before he was expelled by the brother of the Egyptian Pharaoh.; Name based on the Kushite king Amanislo.
61	Ori II; Aram II (Note: Name only appears on Tafari's list.)	30 years	1641–1611 BC	3859–3889	R	Ori previously appeared only on the obscure list H, with 2 years and 9 months of rule, and succeeding Absalisu.
62	Piori II	15 years	1611–1596 BC	3889–3904	E • M	Mentioned in Morié's Histoire de L'Éthiopie as the successor of "Amen-as-ro I".; Paser I, Viceroy of Kush, who was misidentified by Morié as a king of Kush/Aethiopia.
63	Amen Emhat I (Note: Known as Aminswamhat I on Taye's list.); Behas	40 years	1596–1556 BC	3904–3944	E • M • R	Mentioned in Morié's Histoire de L'Éthiopie as the successor of "Poeri II".; Amenemopet, Viceroy of Kush and son of Paser I/Piori II. Misidentified by Morié as a reigning king of Kush/Aethiopia. In Morié's narrative, this king attempted a revolt against Ramesses II.; Bahas appeared on lists C and D, with 9 years of rule on the former list.
64	Tsawe I (Note: Known as Dawe on Taye Gabra Mariam's list. This is likely due to a variation in the reading of the name as "Tsawe" (ጻዌ) or "Dawi" (ዳው).)	15 years	1556–1541 BC	3944–3959	R	Included on lists C and D, with 31 or 34 years of rule on the former list.
65	Aktissanis (Note: Known as Oktisanisa on Taye's list.)	10 years	1541–1531 BC	3959–3969	E • G	Legendary king of Aethiopia Actisanes who, according to Diodorus, defeated Pharaoh Ammoses (Ahmose II) and conquered Egypt. While the reign of Ahmose II was much later than the dates for Aktissanis on this list, the reign of Ahmose I did take place around this time.; Possibly based on the historical Kushite king Aktisanes who ruled Nubia in the early third century BC.
66	Mandes	17 years	1531–1514 BC	3969–3986	G	A legendary Egyptian king who succeeded Actisanes after his death and recovered Egyptian independence, according to Diodorus Siculus. This king had a labyrinth built into his tomb, and this inspired Daedalus, who, after visiting Egypt, built a similar labyrinth for Minos, king of Crete.; This king was Egyptian, but may have been mistaken as "Aethiopian" by the author of this list due to directly succeeding Actisanes.
67	Protawos; Sousel II (Note: Known as Pretowes Seshul on Taye Gabra Mariam's list.)	33 years	1514–1481 BC	3986–4019	G	Egyptian king Proteus from Greek mythology who is mentioned the writings of Herodotus, Euripides and Homer as the next known king after Mandes.; Like Mandes, this king was not "Aethiopian", but may have been assumed to be related to Actisanes by the writer of this regnal list.
68	Amoy I (Note: Known as Amoya on Taye Gabra Mariam's list.)	21 years	1481–1460 BC	4019–4040	R	Previously appeared only on the obscure list H, with 23 years of rule.
69	Konsi Hendawi (Konsi the Indian)	5 years	1460–1455 BC	4040–4045	E • M	Mentioned in Morié's Histoire de L'Éthiopie as the next known king of Aethiopia after "Amen-em-hat I". In Morié's narrative, this king arrived in Aethiopia as part of a Hindu colony and was a "hero remarkable for his beauty and size". He ruled Aethiopia after going into exile following the death of his father by suicide. Despite having a "glorious reign" in which he founded "60 cities" and "drained swamps", he was nonetheless put to death by his subjects.; The word "Aethiopian" was sometimes used in ancient times to refer to people in southern India.; Name based on the name of the Egyptian god Khonsu.
70	Bonu II	2 years	1455–1453 BC	4045–4043	G • M	Legendary king of Egypt Belus.; Mentioned in Morié's Histoire de L'Éthiopie as the first of the "Bennides" who succeeded "Khonsi". In Morié's narrative, this king settled in Aethiopia after his sister Europa was kidnapped by the Cretans and Agenor forbade his sons from returning until she was found. He was unpopular because he was considered a usurper and abdicated in favour of his son Cepheus after two years of rule.
71	Sabe III; Kefe	15 years	1453–1438 BC	4047–4062	G • M	Cepheus, an Aethiopian king from Greek mythology who was the husband of Cassiopeia and father of Andromeda.; Mentioned in Morié's Histoire de L'Éthiopie as the successor of "Bennou II". In Morié's narrative, this king had 20 sons and 2 daughters, ruled over Syene in Egypt, had the Nasamones of Libya and "Aethiopians" of Gedrosia as his tributes, and was deified as the ancient Sicilian god Adranus.; Third son of Bonu II according to Taye Gabra Mariam.
72	Jagones; Sekones	20 years	1438–1418 BC	4062–4082	E • G • M	Mentioned in Morié's Histoire de L'Éthiopie as the successor to "Sebi III" under the name "Se-Khons (Gigon)". In Morié's narrative, it was during this king's reign that an Egyptian prince named "Meneptah", son of Sesostris, fled to Aethiopia and never returned. According to Morié, this king was "probably" killed by Bacchus when he ravaged Aethiopia.; Possibly Danaus, a king of Libya from Greek mythology who is sometimes named as a brother of Cepheus and son of Belus.; Name "Sekones" based on the name of the Egyptian god Khonsu.
73	Senuka II (Note: Mistakenly numbered "Senuka III" on Taye's list. This possibly may be due to Morié's original numbering of the kings.); Feliya I (Note: Known as Felias on Taye's list.)	10 years	1418–1408 BC	4082–4092	M	Mentioned in Morié's Histoire de L'Éthiopie as the successor of "Se-Khons". In Morié's narrative, this king was summoned by Egyptian nobles to declare war on Pharaoh Amenmesse, who was defeated, resulting in Senuka ruling Egypt for 3 years. However, Senuka was later driven out of Egypt by Merneptah-Siptah. He held Seti, son of Merneptah, prisoner in Aethiopia, but a compromise was reached. Morié's interpretation of events is at odds with present-day Egyptology. The dating of the 1922 regnal list for this king does not line up with Morié's dating.; According to Morié's narrative, this king had the noses of thieves cut off before they were sent to Rhinocorura, located on the Egypt-Syria border. This story is inspired by that of Actisanes, who, according to Diodorus Siculus, founded Rhinocorura and conquered Egypt in the reign of pharaoh Amasis.
74	Angabo I Za Kala Arwe (Note: This epithet only appears on Tafari's version of the list. Manfred Kropp theorised it meant "Who slayed the serpent".)	50 years	1408–1358 BC	4092–4142	A • R	A king from Abyssinian tradition who killed a mythical serpent king named Arwe. He appeared on lists C, D, E and F, with 200 years of rule on list C. Arwe appears before Angabo on lists C and E.; Some variations of the Arwe myth claim that Angabo was of non-royal origin and was made king as a reward for slaying Arwe. This version of the legend states that Angabo was a stranger who saved Makeda (the future Queen of Sheba) from being sacrificed to Arwe and that her father was chief minister to king "Za Sebado".; According to some Ethiopian traditions, Angabo was the father of Makeda.; List C dates Angabo's reign around 350 years before Makeda, while the 1922 list places 345 years between them.; According to Taye Gabra Mariam, Angabo was the son of "Adhana".
75	Miamur	2 days	1358 BC	4142	E?	A similar name "Miamun" was used by Josephus to refer to Egyptian pharaoh Ramesses II.
76	Kalina or Belina (Note: Known as Helena on Tafari's list. The variation in names likely arose from the similarity between the Ethiopic lettering for "Kalina" (ካሊና) and "Balina" (ባሊና).) (Queen)	11 years	1358–1347 BC	4142–4153	–	
77	Zagdur I	40 years	1347–1307 BC	4153–4193	R	Gedur or Za Gedur appeared on list C, succeeding Angabo and reigning for 100 years.; According to Taye Gabra Mariam, this king devised the phonetic Ge'ez alphabet.
78	Her Hator II; Ertras	30 years	1307–1277 BC	4193–4223	E • G • M	Mentioned in Morié's Histoire de L'Éthiopie as the successor of "Snouka III".; In Morié's narrative, this king was a grandson of Sabe III (Kefe) and son of Andromeda and Perseus. However, he had no children of his own. His name apparently meant "The Supreme Hathor" and he drowned in the Erythraean Sea, which gets its name from king "Her Hator II (Erythras)", whose name also influenced the naming of Eritrea.
79	Her Hator III (Note: Erroneously named Her Hator (Za Sagado) on Tafari's list and Herhator Zesbado on Taye Gabra Mariam's list. This is likely a mistaken repetition of the next king's name.)	1 year	1277–1276 BC	4223–4224	E • M	Mentioned in Morié's Histoire de L'Éthiopie as the successor of "Her-Hator II". He was a nephew of Her Hator II and son of Perses (son of Andromeda and Perseus).
80	Nekate II (Note: Known as Akate on Tafari Makonnen's list and Nikti on Taye Gabra Mariam's list.); Za Sagado	20 years	1276–1256 BC	4224–4244	G • M • R	This ruler is a combination of two kings from different sources. A king named "Nekhti IV" succeeded "Her-Hathor III" in the narrative of Morié's Histoire de L'Éthiopie. A different king from earlier regnal lists, usually named Sebado, was the successor of Zagdur on list C and reigned for 50 years.; In Morié's narrative, this king was a combination of several different figures from Greek mythology, with the name "Nekhti" being inspired by Nycteus. His daughter Antiope fled to the court of Apis of Argos, who married her. According to Morié, "Nekhti" was killed in battle against Apis.; According to Morié, the Axumite king "Za Sebadho" resided at "Sado" and had only one daughter with his wife "Geres". The daughter's name was "Ismenie-Kallipyge", and the throne passed to his son-in-law "Za-Qaouasya".; Sagado is the name of a mountain in the Amhara region.
81	Titon; Satyo II	10 years	1256–1246 BC	4244–4254	G • M • R	Greek mythical figure Tithonus, a prince of Troy who was the father of the Aethiopian king Memnon and mentioned in Morié's Histoire de L'Éthiopie as the successor of "Nekhti IV".; In Morié's narrative, he attempted to conquer Aethiopia but was taken prisoner by "Nekhti IV". The king's daughter wished to marry Tithonus, and so he was freed and later became king. As king, he ruled parts of Upper Egypt during the reign of Amenmesse according to Morié (although Amenmesse actually reigned over half a century after the dates on this list).; Satyo appeared on lists C and D, reigning for 16 years on the former list, and succeeding Kalas, a name used for Nekate I on this list.
82	Hermantu	5 months (Note: Ethiopian historian Fisseha Yaze Kassa stated that this king reigned for only 1 month. Heruy Wolde Selassie's regnal list also lists a 1-month reign for this king. Manfred Kropp theorized that the confusion could be a transcibal error resulting from the similarity of the Ethiopian numbers for 1 and 5.)	1246 BC	4254	G • M	Greek mythical figure Emathion, who was a son of Tithonus and brother of Memnon.; Mentioned in Morié's Histoire de L'Éthiopie as the successor and illegitimate son of "Tetouni". In Morié's narrative, this king was deceitful and cruel and was killed by Hercules.
83	Amen Emhat II	5 years	1246–1241 BC	4254–4259	G • E • M	Green mythical figure Memnon, king of Aethiopia, who fought in the Trojan War.; Son of Tithonus/Titon and brother of Emathion/Hermantu.; Mentioned in Morié's Histoire de L'Éthiopie as the successor of "Her-Mentou". Morié claimed he was the inventor of the Meroitic script.; Historian Martin Bernal, in his book Black Athena, argued that it was possible for the name "Memnon" to have originated from the Egyptian name "Amenemhat".
84	Konsab I	5 years	1241–1236 BC	4259–4264	E • M	Mentioned in Morié's Histoire de L'Éthiopie as the successor of "Amenemhat II" and a son of Tithonus/Titon. In Morié's narrative, there was a civil war after the death of Amen Emhat II, and Konsab succeeded to the throne. He would defeat Fereydun of Iran when he tried to conquer Konsab's territories. However, Konsab I was defeated in battle by Konsab II and subsequently died or disappeared.; Name refers to the Egyptian god Khonsu.
85	Konsab II (Note: Tafari's list erroneously calls this king Sannib.)	5 years	1236–1231 BC	4264–4269	E • M	Mentioned in Morié's Histoire de L'Éthiopie as the successor of "Khons-Ab I". In Morié's narrative, he was a brother of "Azi-Dahak X" (or "Akhemenes III") and son of "Bakkhemon", who was a son of Perseus. He sought to reclaim the throne of Aethiopia that had once belonged to the descendants of Perseus and succeeded after several years of war.
86	Senuka III	5 years	1231–1226 BC	4269–4274	M	Mentioned in Morié's Histoire de L'Éthiopie as the successor of "Khons-Ab II".
87	Angabo II; Hezbay	40 years	1226–1186 BC	4274–4314	R	While the name "Angabo" did appear on some earlier regnal lists, these usually referred to the first king on this list of the same name. List C does include a king named Agba, whose name was sometimes written as Agabos.; Hezbay previously appeared only on the obscure list H, with 27 years of rule.
88	Amen Astate	30 years	1186–1156 BC	4314–4244	E • M	Mentioned in Morié's Histoire de L'Éthiopie as the successor of "Snouka IV Menken". In Morié's narrative, it was during this king's reign that an Egyptian princess, who was engaged to Ramesses VII, was kidnapped with her servant and taken to the Aethiopian king. The High Priest of Isis, named "Ousir-as-ro", along with three priestesses, was able to bring back the princess.; Egyptian High Priest of Amun Amenhotep who had de facto rule over Thebes before Herihor's reign. According to Ethiopian historian Tekle Sadik Mekuria, this king was the father of Herihor. However, there is no archaeological evidence to prove this.; Morié's narrative in Historie de l'Éthiopie did not identify Amen Astate with the High Priest of Amun Amenhotep and instead claimed there was a gap of 130 years between this king and "Her-Hor".
89	Herhor (Note: Known as Arhor on Taye Gabra Mariam's list.)	16 years	1156–1140 BC	4244–4360	E • M	Egyptian High Priest of Amun Herihor.; Herihor was also Viceroy of Kush during the reign of Ramesses XI.; Some Egyptologists of the late 19th and early 20th centuries believed that Herihor and his successors had been ancestors of the Napatan rulers of Nubia. This theory influenced Morié's narrative in Histoire de L'Éthiopie, in which he described them as an "Ammonian Dynasty" who ruled at Napata.; In Morié's narrative, this king ruled both Egypt and Aethiopia for 10 years before being driven out of Egypt. Morié also credits him as the first ruler of Napata and as the one who introduced embalming to Aethiopia, where cremation had previously been used.
90	Piyankihi I Henquqay	9 years	1140–1131 BC	4360–4369	E • M • R	Egyptian High Priest of Amun Piankh.; Piankh was also Viceroy of Kush and led a campaign into Nubia.; In Morié's narrative, he was the son of Herihor, but archeology suggests otherwise.; Henquqay previously only appeared on the obscure list H, with 15 years of rule. He succeeded Taklay, who is placed after him on the 1922 list.
91	Pinotsem I	17 years	1131–1114 BC	4369–4386	E • M	Egyptian High Priest of Amun Pinedjem I.; Son of Piankh.
92	Pinotsem II	41 years	1114–1073 BC	4386–4427	E • M	This monarch is not based on a historical High Priest of Amun, but was rather an error of late 19th/early 20th century Egyptology.; The existence of a third "Pinedjem" was only accepted by mainstream Egyptology for a brief period (1881–1905).; Morié's narrative in Historie de l'Éthiopie claimed this king was a son of Pinotsem I.
93	Massaherta; Tuklay	16 years	1073–1057 BC	4427–4443	E • M • R	Egyptian High Priest of Amun Masaharta.; Son of Pinedjem I.; Morié's Historie de l'Éthiopie claimed this king was a son of Pinotsem II.; Taklay previously appeared only on the obscure list H, with 5 years of rule. He reigned directly before Henquqay, who is placed before him on the 1922 list instead.
94	Ramenkoperm; Sahel I	14 years	1057–1043 BC	4443–4457	E • M • R	Egyptian High Priest of Amun Menkheperre.; Son of Pinedjem I.; Morié's Historie de l'Éthiopie claimed this king was a son of Pinotsem II.; The name Sahel or Sehul appeared multiple times on list C, with the first king of the name matching most closely with 14 of 17 years of rule. However, he reigned after Abreha and Atsbeha on that list. The name also appeared on lists F and G, but also after Abreha and Atsbeha.
95	Pinotsem III	7 years	1043–1036 BC	4457–4464	E • M	Egyptian High Priest of Amun Pinedjem II.; Son of Menkheperre.
96	Sabe IV	10 years	1036–1026 BC	4464–4474	E • M • R	A combination of two kings from different sources. The historical High Priest of Amun Psusennes III (Pasebakhaennuit) mentioned in Morié's Histoire de L'Éthiopie as the successor of "Pinotsem III" and a king named "Za Sebadh" who is named on Abyssinian regnal lists as the predecessor of "Za Kawnasya".; In Morié's narrative, this king was a relative of Solomon, resulting in him being placed close to the reign of Makeda on this list.
97	Tawasya I Dewes	13 years	1026–1013 BC	4474–4487	A • R	Appeared on list C with 1 year of rule, succeeding Sebado and reigning before Makeda.; According to Taye Gabra Mariam, this king's wife was named Esmeni, and she was the mother of Makeda.; According to Morié, this king had a son named "Nour-al-Rouz" who was burned alive after a nurse accidentally dropped him into a fire. His minister, "Mouezin", usurped the throne while he was on an expedition, but he was defeated. In Morié's narrative, this king's wife was called "Ismenie-Kallipyge", and the king died at the age of 75.
98	Makeda; Saba III; Kandake I (Note: Not named "Kandake" on any known version of this list. However, both Taye Gabra Mariam's list and Heruy Wolde Selassie's list number the next "Kandake" queen as "Kandake II", with the next five "Kandake" queens numbered one higher than on Tafari's list. This suggests that a queen must be identified as "Kandake I" before Nikanta Kandake. Makeda is called "Kandake" in the Kebra Nagast.) (Queen)	31 years	1013–982 BC	4487–4518	A • B • R	The Biblical Queen of Sheba in Ethiopian tradition. She is believed by Ethiopians to have visited King Solomon of the Israel and to have had a son with him named Menelik.; Daughter of Tawsaya.; Appeared on lists C, E, and F, with 50 years of rule on the first list, succeeding Tawasya on list C, and Angabo on lists E and F.; The Kebra Nagast refers to this queen as the "Queen of the South [who] was the Queen of Ethiopia". In this text, she is described as "very beautiful in face", having a "superb" stature and possessing intelligence and understanding of "high character". Because of this, she travelled to Jerusalem to "hear the wisdom of Solomon". The Kebra Nagast also states that she was very rich and traded "by sea and by land" to regions such as India and Aswan in Egypt.; According to the Kebra Nagast, she also supposedly forbade women from ruling Ethiopia in the future, though this is contradicted by thirteen reigning queens who appear later in this list.; The Kebra Nagast claims she abdicated in favour of her son Menelik I.; According to the Book of Axum, Makeda rebuilt Axum in the territory of Aseba, and this was the reason why the Bible refers to her as the "Queen of Saba" and "Queen of Azeb" (i.e., South).; E. A. Wallis Budge theorised that the name "Makeda" may be based on "Maatkare", the throne name of pharaoh Hatshepsut. Alternatively, the name may be based on "mlkt", a Sabaean term for "queen" that appears on some Sabaean inscriptions.

=== Dynasty of Menelik I ===
The next section of this list begins with Menelik I, son of Queen Makeda and King Solomon. The Ethiopian monarchy claimed a line of descent from Menelik that remained unbroken—except for the reign of the Zagwe dynasty—until the monarchy's dissolution in 1975.

Tafari's version of the regnal list divides up the Menelik dynasty into four sections:

- Monarchs who reigned before the birth of Christ (982 BC–9 AD)
- Monarchs who reigned after the birth of Christ (9–306)
- Christian Sovereigns (306–493)
- Christian Emperors Kaleb to Dil Na'od (493–920)

Taye Gabra Mariam's version of the list divides up the dynasty differently:

- Monarchs who reigned before the birth of Christ (1985 BC–9 AD) (Includes all monarchs from Akhunas Saba II to Bazen)
- Monarchs who reigned after the birth of Christ (9–306)
- The Christian Era (306–850)
- The Reign of Gudit (850–920) (Includes Gudit's reign followed by the last two kings of the Axumite line).

Heruy Wolde Selassie considered Makeda to be the first of a new dynasty instead of Menelik.

==== Monarchs who reigned before the birth of Christ ====
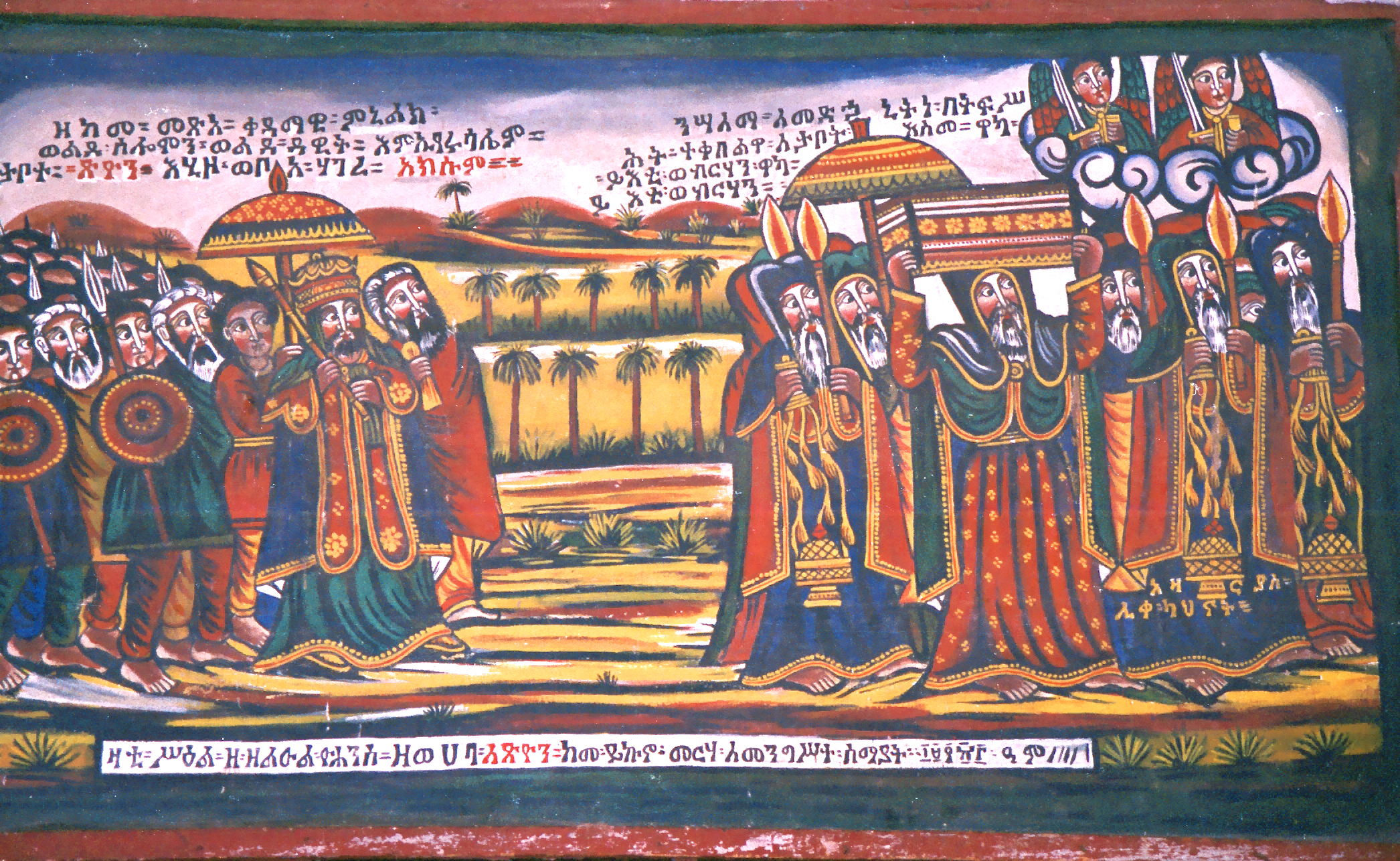
The Ark of the Covenant arriving in Ethiopia with Menelik I

Ethiopian tradition credits Makeda as the first Ethiopian monarch to convert to Judaism after she visited king Solomon, before which she had been worshipping Sabaean gods. However, Judaism did not become the official religion of Ethiopia until Makeda's son Menelik brought the Ark of the Covenant to Ethiopia. While Ethiopian tradition asserts that the kings who followed Menelik maintained the Jewish religion, there is no evidence to that effect; virtually nothing is known about Menelik's successors and their religious beliefs.

Earlier Ethiopian regnal lists, based on either oral or textual tradition, present an alternate order and numbering of the kings of this dynasty. If any other Ethiopian regnal list is considered individually, the number of monarchs from Menelik I to Bazen is insufficient to realistically cover the claimed period from the 10th century BC to the birth of Jesus Christ. The 1922 list attempts to consolidate multiple regnal lists into a single, larger list by naming most kings recorded in oral and textual sources concerning the line of succession from Menelik. The result is a more realistic estimate of the number of monarchs reigning over the course of ten centuries. Of the 67 monarchs on Tafari's list, from Menelik I to Bazen, at least 50 are attested in pre-20th-century Ethiopian regnal lists.

Manfred Kropp noted this section of the regnal lists shows an increasing interweaving of traditional Ethiopian regnal lists with names from Egyptology and Nubiology. These Kushite and Egyptian rulers did not follow the Jewish religion, so their status as alleged successors of Menelik calls into question how strong the 'Judaisation' of Ethiopia truly was in Menelik's reign. These kings do not have Egyptian and Kushite elements in their names on regnal lists from before the 20th century, and these elements were only added in 1922 to provide a stronger link to ancient Kush. Louis J. Morié's book Histoire de l'Éthiopie clearly influenced the names and regnal order of this section of the regnal list, as it had also influenced previous dynasties. The author of the 1922 regnal list combined Morié's line of kings with pre-existing Axumite regnal lists to form a longer line of monarchs from Menelik I's reign in the 10th century BC to Bazen's reign, which coincided with the birth of Christ. In many cases, kings from Morié's book are combined with different kings from the Axumite regnal lists.

Peter Truhart, in his book Regents of Nations, stated that an "Era of Nubian Supremacy" began with the reign of Amen Hotep Zagdur, as from this point onwards many kings' names show clear links to the kings of Napata and Kush. Truhart also stated that the kings from Safelya Sabakon to Apras were likely related to or possibly identifiable with the Pharaohs of the Twenty-fifth and Twenty-sixth dynasties (c. 730–525 BC). He additionally noted that an "Era of Meroen Influence" began with the reign of Kashta Walda Ahuhu.

The following table uses names from Tafari's, Taye Gabra Mariam's, and Heruy Wolde Selassie's lists. Many monarchs have two names, usually one taken from an older regnal list and another taken from Morié's Histoire de l'Éthiopie. The monarch numbered 111th is the only one to have three names – "Sawe" and "Warada Nagash" from Ethiopian regnal lists and "Terhak" from Morié's book.

Key for sources
B	Indicates name originated from the Bible.
E	Indicates name originated from contemporary Egyptology.
G	Indicates name originated from Greek writings.
R	Indicates name originated from earlier regnal lists, as categorised by Carlo Conti Rossini.
M	Indicates name originated from Louis J. Morié's Histoire de L'Éthiopie.

1922 regnal list					Sources	Notes
No.	Name(s)	Reign length	Reign dates		Sources	Notes
No.	Name(s)	Reign length	E.C.	A.M.	Sources	Notes
99	Menelik I Dawit I	25 years	982–957 BC	4518–4543	R	Son of Solomon and Makeda in Ethiopian/Abyssinian tradition, and named on all regnal lists as an ancestor of the Axumite kings. Some lists call this king Ibn Hakim or Ebna El-Hakim, meaning "son of the wise man".; The Kebra Nagast states he ruled in the 10th century BC, which matches the dates listed here.; He was known as "Ebna Lahakim" in the Kebra Nagast with David being his regnal name. The name "Menelik" originated outside the Kebra Nagast in local Ethiopian traditions from later times.; Some Ethiopian traditions state he founded Aksum, while some chronicles claim this was done by Solomon.; According to Taye Gabra Mariam's History of the People of Ethiopia, a group of Israelites came to Ethiopia with Menelik I and later became the ancestors of the Beta Israel tribe.; Some previous regnal lists state Menelik's reign lasted for either 24, 26, 28, 29, or 30 years.
100	Handeyon I (Note: Known as Hanyon on Tafari's list.)	1 year	957–956 BC	4543–4544	R	Name appears on lists B, C, D, and E. He follows Menelik on list C, which states he reigned for 1 year.
101	Sera I Tomai	26 years	956–930 BC	4544–4570	B • M • R	A combination of two kings from different sources. Zerah the Cushite is a Biblical figure who attempted to conquer the Kingdom of Judah but failed. He is mentioned in Morié's Histoire de L'Éthiopie as the successor of King "Ro-ke-Amen" (Menelik). Tomai appears on lists B, F, and H as the successor of Menelik.; Son of Menelik I.; Reigned for 7, 10, or 15 years according to earlier lists.; Known as 'Abd–Rakid on some earlier lists.; "Sera" is also the name of a historical province which roughly corresponds to today's Warada Weqro in eastern Tigray.
102	Amen Hotep; Zagdur II	31 years	930–899 BC	4570–4601	E • M • R	A combination of two kings from different sources. Amenhotep was a son of and the successor of "Zerakh" in Morié's Histoire de L'Éthiopie. Zagdur succeeded Tomai on list B, Menelik on list D, and 'Ab-Rakid' (royal name of Tomai) on list E.; In Morié's narrative, Amenhotep was the son of Sera I with a daughter of Shoshenq I. He was able to retain his father's conquests in Libya but lost control of Thebes.; Zagdur was the son of Handeyon or Tomai, according to Morié. However, Pedro Páez recorded that his father was Menelik I.; Both Heruy Wolde Selassie's list and Alaqa Taye's list state this king ruled for 41 years, from 930 to 889 BC, resulting in all of the following monarchs of this dynasty until Safelya Sabakon (no. 122) having their reign dates pushed forward by 10 years compared to Tafari's list.
103	Aksumay I Ramisu	20 years	899–879 BC	4601–4621	E • M • R	A combination of two kings from different sources. Aksumay succeeded Zagdur on lists B and E. Ramissu was the son and successor of "Amenhotep" in Morié's Histoire de L'Éthiopie.; In Morié's narrative, this king built a temple to Ptah in Aethiopia's capital.; This king's name means "The Aksumite".; "Ramessu" is based on the Egyptian name Ramesses or possibly Pi-Ramesses which is mentioned in the Bible.
104	Sera II; Awseyo (Note: Tafari's list swapped the order of these two names.)	38 years	879–841 BC	4621–4659	B • M • R	A combination of two kings from different sources. Awseyo was the successor of Aksumay on lists B and E, and reigned for 3 years according to list C. Sera II was the successor of "Ramessou" in Morié's Histoire de l'Éthiopie.; According to Morié this king launched a second invasion of Judah and carried off the family of Jehoram, as related in the Bible.
105	Tawasya II	21 years	841–820 BC	4659–4680	R	Succeeded Awseyo on lists B and D.
106	Abralyus; Piyankihi II	32 years	820–788 BC	4680–4712	E • M • R	A combination of two kings from different sources. Abralyus succeeded Tawasya on list B, and reigned for 9 years according to list F. Piyankihi is a name for the historical Kushite Pharaoh of Nubia and Egypt Piye, who was the founder of the Twenty-fifth dynasty and was mentioned in Morié's Histoire de l'Éthiopie.
107	Aksumay II; Warada Sahay	23 years	788–765 BC	4712–4735	R	Warada Sahay succeeded Abralyus on lists B and F, and reigned for 32 years according to the latter.; Morié claimed this king reinstated the ancient cults after Aethiopia had been following Judaism since the reign of Menelik I.
108	Kashta I Handeyon II	13 years	765–752 BC	4735–4748	E • M • R	A combination of two kings from different sources. Kashta was a Kushite king who reigned before Piye, but in Morié's Histoire de l'Éthiopie was named as the successor of Piye. Handeyo succeeded Warada Sahay on list B.
109	Sabaka	12 years	752–740 BC	4748–4760	E • M	Historical Kushite Pharaoh of Nubia and Egypt who was named in Morié's Histoire de l'Éthiopie as the successor of Kashta, though he actually succeeded his father Shebitku.; Some historians have theorized that there may be some affinity between the word "Saba" and the name of the so-called Aethiopian king Sabaka.
110	Nikanta (Note: Known as Nicauta Kandake on Tafari's list.); Kandake II (Note: Numbered Kandake I on Tafari's list.) (Queen)	10 years	740–730 BC	4760–4770	E • M	The first of 6 queens on this list, named Kandake, the Meroitic term for the sister of the king of Kush, who sometimes ruled over Kush as regent or as a monarch in her own right.; The inclusion of this queen on this regnal list may be inspired by Louis J. Morié's claim that Amenirdis I was a "Kantakeh" queen who ruled as regent during the reigns of three Aethiopian kings. This was based on a theory in 19th-century Egyptology that she had ruled as regent of Egypt during the rule of three kings of the Twenty-fifth dynasty of Egypt.; In reality Amenirdis was a God's Wife of Amun during the time of the Twenty-fifth Dynasty of Egypt. She was the daughter of Kashta.; The name Nicanta was used as one of the alternate names for the Queen of Sheba by Morié.
111	Sawe II; Terhak; Warada Nagash II	49 years	730–681 BC	4770–4819	B • E • M • R	A combination of three kings from different sources. "Terhak" is a name for the historical Kushite Pharaoh Taharqa who was mentioned in Morié's Histoire de l'Éthiopie as the successor of Shabaka. Sawe succeeded Awseyo and preceded Gasyo on list C, which stated he reigned for 31 or 34 years. Warada Nagash appeared on lists B and F.; Taharqa was mentioned in the Hebrew Bible (2 Kings 19:9; Isaiah 37:9), where he fought against Sennacherib of the Neo-Assyrian Empire. The Hebrew Bible calls him the "King of Ethiopia", although this specifically refers to the Kingdom of Kush in Nubia.
112	Erda Amen; Awseya I	6 years	681–675 BC	4819–4825	E • M • R	A combination of two kings from different sources. Ourd-Amen was the successor and son-in-law of "Tahraka" in Morié's Histoire de l'Éthiopie. Awesya succeeded Warada Nagash on list B.; In Morié's narrative, this king was a son of Takahatenamun, who was apparently a widow when she married Taharqa. "Ourd-Amen" was chosen as successor and married a daughter of Taharqa. Egyptological works in the 19th century believed that a king named "Urdamen" had succeeded his father-in-law Taharqa but was defeated by the Assyrians. However it later became known that "Urdamen" was simply the name Assyrians gave to Tantamani.
113	Gasyo; Eskikatir I (Note: Translates to "until noon".)	6 hours (Note: Tafari's list provides no reign length for this king.)	675 BC	4825	R	Succeeded Sawe on lists C and D, the former stating he reigned for half a day.
114	Nuatmeawn	4 years	675–671 BC	4825–4829	E • M • R	Historical Kushite Pharaoh Tantamani who was mentioned in Morié's Histoire de l'Éthiopie under the name "Nouat-Meimoun". In Morié's narrative, this king was a son of "Ourd-Amen" who was elected by the Oracle of Amun in Napata.; A king named Mawat succeeded Gasyo on list C, reigning for 8 years.
115	Toma Seyon (Note: Known as Tomadion Piankhi III on Taye Gabra Mariam's list and Tomadyon Piyankihi III on Tafari's list.); Piyankihi III	12 years	671–659 BC	4829–4841	A • M • R	A combination of two kings from different sources. Toma Seyon appears on lists B and E, though in a different chronological placement than this list. Piankhi III was the successor of "Nouat-Meimaoun" in Morié's Histoire de l'Éthiopie.; In Morié's narrative, this king was the widower of Amenirdis I and after his death his cartouches were hammered out and erased.; "Toma-Seyon" means "Twin of Zion".
116	Amen Asro II	16 years	659–643 BC	4841–4857	E • M	Historical Kushite king Amanislo.; Successor of "Piankhi III" in Morié's Histoire de l'Éthiopie.; In Morié's narrative, this king was a son or brother of Nuatmeawn/Tantamani. During his reign, 240,000 Meshwesh warriors rebelled against Psamtik I and emigrated en masse to Aethiopia. They worked for Amen Asro II, who permitted them to conquer more territory on his behalf. Morié claimed they founded their own kingdom, which was later located in the Shilluk Kingdom.; Also, according to Morié's narrative, this king had a queen named "Hatasou" and two daughters, including one named "Ait". The Egyptians killed the queen and kidnapped "Ait", who was given to Psamtik I's daughter "Amen-merit" as an enslaved person. Amen Asro then waged war on Egypt but was taken prisoner by an Egyptian general named "Ramessou", who was betrothed to Psamtik's daughter. The general, however, fell in love with Amen Asro's daughter and attempted to leave Egypt with them both, but only Amen Asro escaped. The general and "Ait" were both sentenced to death, and Amen Asro died when defending his life from a group of Egyptians who had been sent to capture him.
117	Piyankihi IV (Note: Known as Läwiyankihi IV in Taye Gabra Mariam's History of the People of Ethiopia.); Awtet I	34 years	643–609 BC	4857–4891	E • M • R	A combination of two kings from different sources. Piankhi IV was the successor of "Amen-as-ro II" in Morié's Histoire de l'Éthiopie. Awtet appeared on lists B, D, and E, reigning directly after Gasyo/Basyo on all three lists.; Morié's narrative, he was the son of Piyankihi III and Amenirdis I and married to "Kenensat", daughter of an Egyptian prince who was descended from the Twenty-second dynasty and princess "Moutiritis", who was his sister.; According to Taye Gabra Mariam's History of the People of Ethiopia, in the year 627 B.C./4873 A.M., the tribe of Asmakih disputed with Pharaoh Psamtik I and an army of 240,000 deserted him and came to Ethiopia, joining the Ethiopian king. The king was in Nawatan (Napata) at the time and gladly took them in, allowing them to reconquer territory that had been lost to enemies. This tribe later settled where the Blue Nile and White Nile meet and built a city called Ezar where they lived for 300 years, the territory was later the location of the Shilluk Kingdom. This narrative was directly lifted from Louis J. Morié's Histoire de l'Éthiopie, in which he included a very similar narrative, but instead claimed this took place in the reign of Amenasro II.
118	Zaware Nebret I Aspurta	41 years	609–568 BC	4891–4932	E • M • R	A combination of two kings from different sources. Zaware Nebrat succeeded Awtet on lists B and E. "Aspurta" is the historical Kushite king Aspelta who was mentioned in Morié's Histoire de l'Éthiopie as the successor of "Piankhi IV".; "Zaware Nebrat" means "seed of the High Priest".; In Morié's narrative, this king was chosen by the Oracle of Amun in Napata, and his wife was named "Matsenen", and she was a priestess of Mut and daughter of "Nensaou". They had a daughter named "Kheb-ha".
119	Safay I Harsiataw	12 years	568–556 BC	4932–4944	E • M • R	A combination of two kings from different sources. Safay succeeded Zaware Nebrat on lists B, E, and H, reigning for 11 years on list H. "Harsiataw" is the historical Kushite king Harsiotef who was mentioned in Morié's Histoire de l'Éthiopie as the successor of "Aspourta".; According to Morié, this king fought against various tribes and was defeated by the "Meroities", who Morié considered to be a distinct people from the Napatan people.
120	Ramhay I Nastosonan	14 years	556–542 BC	4944–4958	E • M • R	A combination of two kings from different sources. Ramhay succeeded Safay on list B, E, and H, reigning for 15 years on list H. "Nastossanan" was the historical Kushite king Nastasen who was mentioned in Morié's Histoire de l'Éthiopie as the successor of "Hor-se-atew I".; An unpublished chronicle from Aksum states that a king named "Ramahay" reigned at the time of Alexander the Great and asked for Greek technicians and engineers to build palaces, monuments, and stelae, one of which was destroyed centuries later by Gudit. Alexander's rule of Egypt did not begin until 332 BC, over two centuries after these dates, and thus either the dating is wrong or this legend refers to the second king named Ramhay on this list (no. 145). Perhaps coincidentally, the Kushite king Nastasen did in fact reign during the time of Alexander the Great. It is unknown whether this is why the author of this regnal list associated Nastasen with Ramahay, despite the Kushite king's absence from earlier Ethiopian regnal lists.; In Morié's narrative, this king was descended from Cepheus, Perseus, and Memnon, and was married to "Ashen", a daughter of Psamtik III who fled Egypt following the Achaemenid conquest. According to Morié, the Greeks described "Nastosenen" as athletic and tall.; Morié's narrative also drew inspiration from an account written by Herodotus about a Macrobian king was suspicious of Ichthyophagoi sent by Cambyses II and stated that Cambyses was an unjust man, resulting in Cambyses becoming and angry and sending in an army only to be defeated and many soldiers resorting to cannibalism. According to Morié, the Macrobian king was "Nastosenen", who was sent ambassadors from Cambyses but was suspicious of them and gave them a bow to take back to Cambyses, saying that if the Persians could draw a bow with the same skill as the Aethiopians, then they can attack.
121	Handu I Wuha Abra	11 years	542–531 BC	4958–4969	E • G • M • R	A combination of two kings from different sources. Hande succeeded Ramhay on list B. Houd-es-ew was the successor of "Nastosenen" in Morié's Histoire de l'Éthiopie.; In Morié's narrative, this monarch was King Hydaspes of Aethiopia, a character from Aethiopica, an ancient Greek book written by Heliodorus of Emesa.; According to Morié, he was the brother of Nastossanan and the Greek language was widely spoken at the court of Meroe during his reign. Morié also believed that Aryandes, Satrap of Egypt, went to war with Aethiopia during his reign.; The name "Wuha Abra" is based on the ancient Egyptian name "Wahibre", used by kings such as Wahibre Ibiau.
122	Safelya I Sabakon	31 years	531–500 BC	4969–5000	E • M • R	A combination of two kings from different sources. Safelya succeeded Hande on list B. "Sabakon" was an alternate name for Kushite Pharaoh Shabaka, as used by Diodorus in his work Bibliothecia Historia.
123	Agalbus I Sepekos	22 years	500–478 BC	5000–5022	E • R	A combination of two kings from different sources. Aglebu succeeded Safelya on lists B, C, D, and E, reigning for 3 years on list C. "Sepekos"/"Sebikhos" is an alternate name for the Kushite Pharaoh Shebitku used in Manetho's Aegyptica.; Both Taye Gabra Mariam's list and Heruy Wolde Selassie's list stated this king reigned for 21 years, from 490 to 469 BC. This, combined with the addition of 10 years to Amen Hotep Zagdur's reign earlier, results in all monarchs of this dynasty up to Feliya Hernekhit on Selassie's list and Nicotnis Kandake V on Taye's list having their reign dates pushed forward by 11 years compared to Tafari's list.
124	Pesmarit; Warada Nagash II	21 years	478–457 BC	5022–5043	E? • R	Warada Nagash appears on lists B, D, and F, though in a different chronological placement than this list.; The name "Pesmarit" is possibly based on the name "Psamtik" used by some pharaohs of the Twenty-sixth dynasty.; According to Taye Gabra Mariam's History of the People of Ethiopia, the Amharic language was spoken at least as far back as the year 478 BC/5022 AM.
125	Awseya II; Tarakos	12 years	457–445 BC	5043–5055	E • R	Awesya succeeded Warada Nagash on list B.; "Tarakos" is an alternate name for Taharqa, as used by Eusebius in his quoting of Manetho's list of Pharaohs.
126	Qaniz; Pismes	13 years	445–432 BC	5055–5068	R	Kanaz appeared on list C, reigning for 7 or 10 years.; Son of Awseya Tarakos, according to Tafari's list.
127	Apras	10 years	432–422 BC	5068–5078	E	Historical Egyptian pharaoh Apries.
128	Kashta II; Walda Ekhuhu	20 years	422–402 BC	5078–5098	E • R	The name Walda Mehrat appeared on list E.; "Walda Ekhuhu" is an Ethiopian form of "son of his brother", similar to the titles used by the Ptolemies.
129	Elalion; Ta'aniki	10 years	402–392 BC	5098–5108	M • R	A combination of two kings from different sources. Elalyon appeared on lists B, E, and H, reigning for 10 years and 1 month on list H. Taaaken was mentioned in Morié's Histoire de l'Éthiopie.; In Morié's narrative, "Taaaken" was Theagenes from Aethiopica, who was married to Chariclea. The name "Taaaken" may be taken from the real-life Kushite king Talakhamani.; Elalyon restored Judaism as the official religion of Aethiopia according to Morié.
130	Atserk Amen I	10 years	392–382 BC	5108–5118	E • M	Mentioned in Morié's Histoire de l'Éthiopie as a king who ruled in the 4th century BC and during whose reign the north-east part of Aethiopia fell under the rule of the Pharaoh Ptolemy II.; This king was mistakenly numbered "Atserk Amen III" on all versions of the list, with the other three kings of this name numbered fourth to sixth. The confusion over the numbering of the kings named "Atserk Amen" stems from the numbering used by Morié, who numbered this king as the third to use this name. However, the first two kings named "Atserk Amen" in his narrative were renamed to "Sera I (Tomai)" (no. 101) and "Awseyo Sera II" (no. 104) on the 1922 Ethiopian regnal list.; Peter Truhart believed the four kings named "Atserk Amen" were based on the name of a Merotic king, though does not specify who.
131	Atserk Amen II	10 years	382–372 BC	5118–5128	E • M	Mentioned in Morié's Histoire de l'Éthiopie as a king who ruled in the 3rd century BC and was the successor of "Erk-Amen I". In Morié's original narrative, this king prevented Ptolemy IV from expanding his territory into Aethiopia beyond Qasr Ibrim and built the temples of Dakka and Debod. In reality, the former temple was built in collaboration between Ptolemy IV and Arqamani, while the Temple of Debod was built by Adikhalamani, though later expanded by the Ptolemaic pharaohs of Egypt.
132	Hadina (Queen)	10 years	372–362 BC	5128–5138	R	Appeared twice on list C, ruling for 1, 2, 4, 6, or 9 years.
133	Atserk Amen III	10 years	362–352 BC	5138–5148	E	
134	Atserk Amen IV	10 years	352–342 BC	5148–5158	E	
135	Nikawla; Kandake III (Note: Numbered Kandake II on Tafari's list.) (Queen)	10 years	342–332 BC	5158–5168	E • M	Kantakeh II was a queen who ruled in the 4th century BC during the time of Alexander the Great in Morié's Histoire de l'Éthiopie, which also identified her as the queen from the Alexander Romance.; Nicaula was a name that was sometimes used to refer to the Queen of Sheba. Morié listed this as one of the alternate names for the Queen of Sheba.; Giovanni Boccaccio, in his work De Mulieribus Claris (1361–1362), claimed that queen "Nicaula" was queen of Aethiopia, Egypt and Arabia and had a large palace on the island of Meroe. The Queen of Sheba was also called "Nicaula" in The Book of the City of Ladies (1405) by Christine de Pizan and A New History of Ethiopia (1684) by Hiob Ludolf, the latter doubting that "Nicaula" was also queen of Egypt. Ludolf theorised the name "Nicaula" could have been a corruption of the name Nitocris recorded by Herodotus.; Portuguese missionary Jerónimo Lobo noted that contemporary Abyssinians/Ethiopians in the 17th century sometimes used the name "Nicaula" for the Queen of Sheba, alongside the names "Makeda" and "Nagista Azeb".
136	Bassyo	7 years	332–325 BC	5168–5175	R	Appeared on lists B, D and E.
137	Nikawsis; Kandake IV (Note: Numbered Kandake III on Tafari's list.) (Queen)	10 years	325–315 BC	5175–5185	E • M	Kantakeh III was a queen who ruled in the 1st century BC as the first of the "Blemmyes dynasty" in Morié's Histoire de l'Éthiopie. Nicausis was listed by Morié as one of the alternate names for the Queen of Sheba.; Morié's narrative dated this queen to the time of Gaius Petronius. It stated that he attempted to conquer the Kingdom of Kush but was defeated by the queen, after which he entered into negotiations with her. According to Morié, the queen's favourite residence was the Gash-Barka region in modern-day Eritrea. The 1922 regnal list instead placed the fifth queen named "Kandake" in the time period contemporary with Petronius.
138	Arkamen I	10 years	315–305 BC	5185–5195	E • G • M	Erk-Amen I was mentioned in Morié's Histoire de l'Éthiopie as a king who ruled in the 3rd century BC and succeeded "Atserk-Amen III".; Morié's original narrative identified this king with Ergamenes, a Kushite king mentioned in the writings of Diodorus Siculus who resented the power of the priests and wished to have absolute power like Ptolemy II, so he abolished the priesthood. Ergamenes was also said to be interested in Greek philosophy. In Morié's narrative, the king "Erk-Amen I" marched with his army to Arada, where the Temple of Gold was located, and slaughtered the priests, afterward instituting a hereditary monarchy instead of an elective one.; Modern-day archaeologists consider Arqamani to be the most likely king of Kush that the story of Ergamenes is based on.; Alaqa Taye Gabra Mariam swapped this king's position with Awtet Arawura below.
139	Awtet II; Arawra	10 years	305–295 BC	5195–5205	E • M • R	Awtet appeared on lists A, B, D, and E, succeeding Basyo on all except A.; Arou-Amen was the successor of "Atserk-Amen IV" in Louis J. Morié's Histoire de l'Éthiopie, and he had a peaceful reign.; Taye Gabra Mariam swapped this king's position with Arkamen I above.
140	Kalas II (Note: Known as Kolas (Koletro) on Tafari's list.); Kalitro	10 years	295–285 BC	5205–5215	R	Kalaz appeared on lists C and D, succeeding Hadina on both and reigning for 6 years on the former list.
141	Zaware Nebrat II	16 years	285–269 BC	5215–5231	R	Appeared on lists B, E, and H, succeeding Awtet B and E.
142	Satyo III	14 years	269–255 BC	5231–5245	R	Appeared on list C, succeeding Kalas and reigning for 16 years.
143	Safay II	13 years	255–242 BC	5245–5258	R	Appeared on lists B, E, and H, succeeding Zaware Nebrat on all three lists and reigning for 11 years on list H.
144	Nikosis; Kandake V (Note: Numbered Kandake IV on Tafari's list.) (Queen)	10 years	242–232 BC	5258–5268	E • M	Nicausis was listed by Morié as one of the alternate names for the Queen of Sheba. Kantakeh IV was a queen who ruled in the 1st century BC and succeeded "Kantakeh III" in Morié's Histoire de l'Éthiopie.
145	Ramhay II; Arkamen II	10 years	232–222 BC	5268–5278	E • G • M • R	A combination of two kings from different sources. Ramhay appeared on lists B, E, and H, reigning for 15 years on H, and succeeding Safay on all three lists. Erk-Amen II was the son and successor of "Kantakeh IV" in Morié's Histoire de l'Éthiopie.; Ergamenes, a Kushite king reported by Greek historian Agatharchides to have reigned during the time of Pharaoh Ptolemy IV of Egypt.; An unpublished chronicle from Axum states that a king named "Ramahay" reigned at the time of Alexander the Great and asked for Greek technicians and engineers to build palaces, monuments, and stelae, one of which was destroyed centuries later by Gudit. Alexander's rule of Egypt took place during 332–323 BC, and thus this king's reign on this regnal list is a century too late to be a contemporary of Alexander. However, this story of King Ramahay bears notable similarities to the story of Ergamenes, who was said to have been instructed in Greek philosophy, to have been interested in Greek art and the general Greek way of life. It is therefore possible that naming this king "Ramhay Arkamen" is intended to reflect that "Ramahay" is to be identified with "Ergamenes".
146	Feliya II; Hurnekhet	15 years	222–207 BC	5278–5293	M • R	A combination of two kings from different sources. Filya appeared on lists B, C, D, and E, reigning for 26 years on list C. Hor-nekht-atew was a king who succeeded Erk-Amen III in Morié's Histoire de l'Éthiopie.; Morié's narrative placed this king much later, at the time of the death of Roman emperor Commodus, after which he tried to conquer Upper Egypt and was recognised by Pescennius Niger, whom he helped to usurp the Roman throne. Still, both were defeated by Septimius Severus. The 1922 regnal list placed this king's reign much earlier than Morié.; According to Morié, "Hor-nekht-atew" was married to "Tsetisi", a daughter of an Aethiopian official, who gave birth to several sons. Their eldest son was named "Pasan". "Hor-nekht-atew" had a second wife named "Moutoeri", with whom he had a son named "Ouikera". "Hor-nekht-atew" disinherited his eldest son, "Pasan", in favour of passing the throne to "Ouikera", leading to infighting that affected the last years of his reign.
147	Handu II; Awkerara	20 years	207–187 BC	5293–5313	M • R	A combination of two kings from different sources. Handu appeared on list B, succeeding Ramhay. Ouikera was the successor of "Hor-nekht-atew" in Morié's Histoire de l'Éthiopie.; In Morié's narrative, this king was the son of "Hor-nekht-atew" and succeeded him to the throne instead of his elder brother "Pasan". As a result, the first 15 to 20 years of his reign were filled with infighting with his brother.; Heruy Wolde Selassie's regnal list states this king reigned for 22 years. This, along with the addition of 10 years to the reign of Amen Hotep Zagdur (no. 102) and the removal of 1 year from the reign of Agalbus Sepekos (no. 123), results in all monarchs up to Queen Nicotnis Kandake V (no. 162) having their reign dates pushed forward by 11 years compared to Tafari's list.
148	Aghabu; Beseheran	10 years	187–177 BC	5313–5323	M • R	A combination of two kings from different sources. Aglebu appeared on lists B, C, D, and E, reigning for 3 years on list C, and succeeding Safelya or Feliya on all lists. (Note: Edwards)Psheraan was the successor of "Ouikera" in Morié's Histoire de l'Éthiopie.; In Morié's narrative, this king was the son and successor of "Hor-nekht-atew". Morié dated this king's rule to the 3rd century AD, during which the king ruled Philae and Elephantine. He took advantage of the decline of the Roman Empire and the death of Gallienus and was declared king at Thebes. He supported the usurper Firmus and also Zenobia, but was defeated by Aurelian. After the latter's death, he again invaded Egypt and ruled Thebes for 4 years before being driven out by Probus.; Some earlier Ethiopian regnal lists state this king reigned for 3 years.
149	Sulay; Kawawmenun	20 years	177–157 BC	5323–5343	M • R	A king named Lulay or Susay appeared on the obscure list H, reigning for 19 years.; Khouwoumenou was successor of "Psheraan" in Morié's Histoire de l'Éthiopie. According to Morié, this king had several children.
150	Masalne II; Qurarmer	8 years	157–149 BC	5343–5351	M • R	Masalni appeared on the obscure list H with 20 years of rule and succeeding Lulay/Susay.; Tereremen was the next known king after "Psheraan" in Morié's Histoire de l'Éthiopie.
151	Nagsey; Besinte	10 years	149–139 BC	5351–5361	M • R	Nagsay appeared on the obscure list H, with 18 years of rule and preceding Lulay/Susay and Masalni, rather than succeeding them like on this list.; Psentes was the next known king after "Tereremen" in Morié's Histoire de l'Éthiopie.
152	Etbenukawer	10 years	139–129 BC	5361–5371	M	Berou-Kanower was the next known king after "Psentes" in Morié's Histoire de l'Éthiopie.
153	Safelya II; Abramen	20 years	129–109 BC	5371–5391	M • R	A combination of two kings from different sources. Safelya appeared on lists B, C, and D. Ab-ra-amen was a king who reigned at some point after Berou-Kanower in Morié's Histoire de l'Éthiopie.; According to Morié, this king had a wife named "Nekarou".; E. A. Wallis Budge and Peter Truhart both suggested that this king could be the Axumite king Aphilas, although the reign dates on this list are far too early.
154	Sanay	10 years	109–99 BC	5391–5401	R	Appeared on the obscure list H, with 20 years of rule and succeeding Masalni.
155	Awsena (Queen)	11 years	99–88 BC	5401–5412	R	Appeared on lists C and D, reigning for 1 year on the former list.
156	Dawit II	10 years	88–78 BC	5412–5422	R	Appeared on the obscure list H, succeeding Sanay and reigning for 22 years.
157	Agalbus II	8 years	78–70 BC	5422–5430	R	Appeared on lists B, C, D, and E, reigning for 3 years on list C.
158	Bawawel	10 years	70–60 BC	5430–5440	R	Appeared on lists B, D, and E, succeeding Aglebul on lists B and D.
159	Barawas	10 years	60–50 BC	5440–5450	R	Appeared on lists B, C, D, and E, reigning for 19 years on list C and succeeding Bawawel on lists B and D.; Name means "esteemed defender".
160	Danidad	10 years	50–40 BC	5450–5460	R	Appeared on the obscure list H, succeeding Amoy and reigning for 24 years.
161	Amoy II; Mahasi	5 years	40–35 BC	5460–5465	R	Amoy appeared on the obscure list H, reigning for 23 years, succeeding Dawit and preceding Duniday.; Mahasi appeared on lists B, C, D, and E, reigning for 1 year on list C, succeeding Bawaris on lists B and C, and succeeding Awsena on list D.; "Mahasi" means "Pious man".
162	Nicotris (Note: Known as Nicotnis Kandake V on Tafari's list.); Kandake VI (Queen)	10 years	35–25 BC	5465–5475	E • M	Nitocris was listed by Morié as one of the alternate names for the Queen of Sheba.; Nitocris was the name of a woman who was Divine Adoratrice of Amun and God's Wife of Amun and succeeded two different Kushite women in both offices.; Kushite queen Amanirenas reigned during this period, but her rule did not extend to modern-day Ethiopia.
163	Nalke	5 years	25–20 BC	5475–5480	R	Appeared on lists B, D, and E and succeeded Mahasi on all three lists.; One version of Heruy Wolde Selassie's regnal list and Alaqa Taye's regnal list both state that this king reigned for 4 years, from 14 to 10 BC; Ethiopian historian Fisseha Yaze Kassa stated that this king reigned for 2 years.
164	Luzay	12 years	20–8 BC	5480–5492	R	Appeared on the obscure list H.; One version of Heruy Wolde Selassie's regnal list and Taye Gabra Mariam's regnal list both state that this king reigned for 2 years, from 10 to 8 BC In the case of Selassie's list, this was done due to the Christianisation of Ethiopia being moved forward ten years from 317 to 327.; Ethiopian historian Fisseha Yaze Kassa stated that this king reigned for 8 years.
165	Bazen	17 years	8 BC–9 AD	5492–5509	R	Appeared on all lists except H, and the lists consistently state that Jesus Christ was born in the eighth year of his reign. He reigned for 17 years according to list C.; Ethiopian historian Fisseha Yaze Kassa stated that this king reigned for 6 years.; A tomb is known to exist for this king, and some local Ethiopian traditions claim he was Bathlazar.; Egyptologist Henry Salt claimed that he saw an ancient inscription on a stone in a church in Axum stating "This is the sepulchral stone of Bazen". He did however claim that this was the name of several Abyssinian kings, so he may not have been referring to this specific king.

==== Monarchs who reigned after the birth of Christ ====
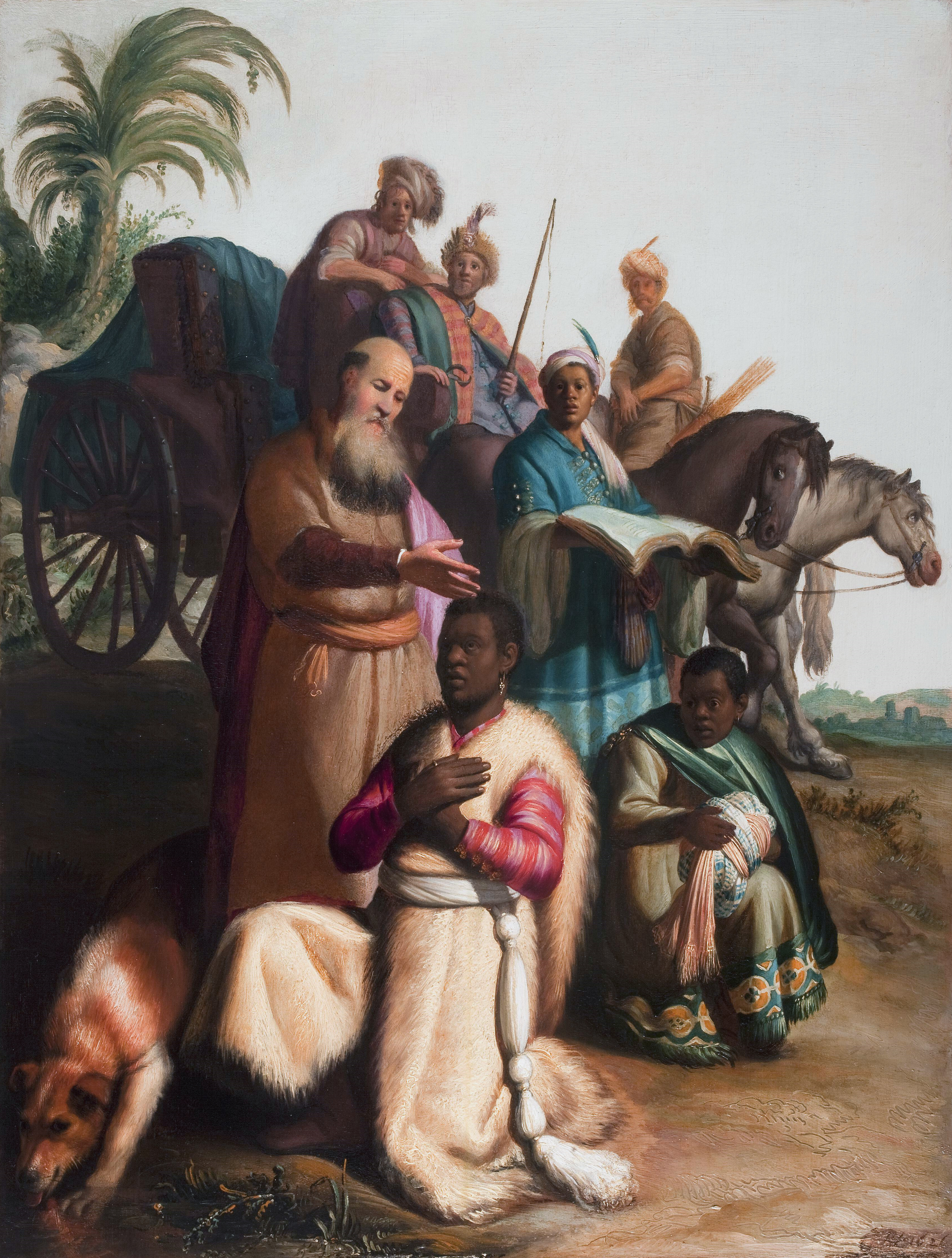
Rembrandt, The Baptism of the Eunuch, c. 1626

Text accompanying this section on Tafari's list:
"These thirty-five sovereigns at the time of Akapta Tsenfa Arad had been Christianized by the Apostle Saint Matthew. There were few men who did not believe, for they had heard the words of the gospel. After this Jen Daraba, favourite of the Queen of Ethiopia, Garsemat Kandake, crowned by Gabre Hawariat Kandake, had made a pilgrimage to Jerusalem according to the law of Orit (the ancient law), (Note: "Orit" comes from the Syriac word "Urayta", meaning the law of Moses and the Torah.) and on his return Philip the Apostle [sic] taught him the gospel, and after he had made him believe the truth he sent him back, baptising him in the name of the trinity. The latter (the Queen's favourite), on his return to his country, taught by word of mouth the coming of our Saviour Jesus Christ and baptised them. Those who were baptised, not having found an Apostle to teach them the Gospel, had been living offering sacrifices to God according to the ancient prescription and the Jewish Law."

Despite the text above claiming that Christianity was introduced to Ethiopia during this line of monarchs, this retelling of events contradicts both the known information around the Christianisation of Ethiopia and the story of Queen Ahwya Sofya and Abreha and Atsbeha in the next section.

The claim that Matthew the Apostle had Christianized king Akaptah Tsenfa Arad (no. 167) is inspired by Louis J. Morié's narrative in Historie de l'Éthiopie, in which he stated that a king named "Hakaptah" ruled Aethiopia in c. 40 AD; it was during his reign that Matthew converted the king's daughter Ephigenia. This narrative was inspired by the older Church story of Matthew which involved a king named "Egippus".

The story of Garsemot Kandake and Jen Daraba is based on the Biblical account of the Ethiopian eunuch, treasurer to Kandake, queen of the Ethiopians, who was baptized after travelling to Jerusalem. However, the eunuch was baptised by Philip the Evangelist, not by Philip the Apostle, as Tafari mistakenly states. Louis J. Morié did not accept that this Kandake queen was the one mentioned in the story of the Ethiopian eunuch. The apparent contradiction in the story of the Christianisation of Ethiopia according to Tafari's regnal list is due to an attempt to accommodate both the native Abyssinian tradition around Abreha and Atsbeha and the Biblical traditions of "Ethiopia" (i.e., Nubia).

Taye Gabra Mariam's version of this list does not refer to the traditions of the Baptism by Matthew the Apostle and the Biblical Kandake, omitting the name "Akaptah" for the 167th monarch and omitting the name "Kandake" for the 169th monarch.

This section is the last part of the regnal list that directly refers to ancient Nubia and the Kingdom of Kush, which ended in the 4th century AD after its conquest by Ezana.

Peter Truhart believed the line of Axumite kings began with Gaza Agdur (no. 188) and dated the beginning of his reign to c. 150.

Key for sources
B	Indicates name originated from the Bible.
M	Indicates name originated from Louis J. Morié's Histoire de L'Éthiopie.
R	Indicates name originated from earlier regnal lists, as categorised by Carlo Conti Rossini.

1922 regnal list					Sources	Notes
No.	Name(s)	Reign length	Reign dates		Sources	Notes
No.	Name(s)	Reign length	E.C.	A.M.	Sources	Notes
166	Sartu; Senfa Asagad	21 years	9–30	5509–5530	R	Sartu succeeded Bazen on list C and reigned for 26 or 27 years.; Senfa Asgad succeeded Bazen on lists A, D and G.; This king was remembered as a bad ruler.
167	Akaptah; Senfa Arad I	8 years	30–38	5530–5538	M • R	An Aethiopian king named "Egippus" who, in Church tradition, was the father of saint Ephigenia of Ethiopia, who was consecrated by Matthew. This king appeared in Morié's Histoire de l'Éthiopie under the name Hakaptah and was dated to the 1st century AD.; Senfa Arad succeeded Bazen on list B.; Both Heruy Wolde Selassie's regnal list and Taye Gabra Mariam's regnal list state this king ruled for only 2 years, from 30 to 32 AD; Taye Gabra Mariam ignored the Church tradition of Egippus on his list and names this king as only "Tsenfe Ared".
–	Settah	–	–	–	–	An additional name found on Taye Gabra Mariam's version of this list, who reigned for 8 years, from 32 to 40.
168	Horemtaku	2 years	38–40	5538–5540	M	King Hirtacus, who, in Church tradition, asked Matthew the Apostle to persuade Ephigenia to marry him, but instead Matthew rebuked the king for lusting after her, and the king promptly had Matthew killed while he stood at the altar. This king appeared in Morié's Histoire de l'Éthiopie under the name Hor-em-tekhou and succeeded "Hakaptah". In Morié's narrative, this king turned back to the cult of Isis and later helped Roman envoys in their search to find the source of the Nile, but they were unable to do so.; Brother of Akaptah/Egippus.; Taye Gabra Mariam's list stated this king reigned from 40 to 42.; Heruy Wolde Selassie's regnal list stated this king reigned from 32 to 34.
169	Garsemot; Kandake VII (Note: Numbered Kandake VI on Tafari's list. The name "Kandake" does not appear on Taye Gabra Mariam's list.) (Queen)	10 years	40–50	5540–5550	B • M • R	Kandake or "Candace", the Biblical "queen of the Aethiopians" whose eunuch travelled to Jerusalem and was converted by Philip the Evangelist.; A queen named "Kandake" succeeded "Hor-em-tekhou" in Morié's Histoire de l'Éthiopie. Morié, however, did not consider her to be the Kandake of the Bible.; The historical Kandake whose period of rule may align with this monarch could be Amanitore who ruled in the 1st century AD.; According to some Ethiopian traditions, the first church of Ethiopia, the Church of Our Lady Mary of Zion, was built during this queen's reign by a eunuch after her conversion to Christianity. However, it is more likely the church was built by Ezana in the 4th century after his conversion to Christianity.; Heruy Wolde Selassie's regnal list stated this queen ruled for 8 years, from 34 to 42.; Taye Gabra Mariam's list likewise claimed this queen ruled for 8 years, but dated her reign to 42–50. Taye's list also does not include the name "Kandake" for this ruler, suggesting he ignored the Biblical story of the Ethiopian eunuch.; Manfred Kropp theorised the name "Garsemot" was an altered form of the names Germa Sor or Germa Asfare that appear on some earlier regnal lists.
170	Hatez; Bahar Asagad	28 years	50–78	5550–5578	R	Bahar Asgad succeeded Senfa Ared on lists A, B and D.; According to Taye Gabra Mariam's History of the People of Ethiopia, a group of Jews fled to Ethiopia after the Siege of Jerusalem (70 AD) and became part of the Beta Israel.; Could be the Aksumite king Hataz, though he is usually dated to the 6th or 7th centuries.
171	Mesenh; Germa Sor	7 years	78–85	5578–5585	R	Masenh appeared on list C, reigning for 6 years and succeeding La'as, who succeeded Sartu.; Germa Sor succeeded Bahar Asagad on list B, and succeeded Bazen on list E.
172	Setwa; Germa Asfare I	9 years	85–94	5585–5594	R	Sutuwa or Satwa succeeded Masenh on list C and reigned for 9 years.; Germa Asfare succeeded Germa Sor on list B, and succeeded Bahar Asagad on lists D and G.
173	Adgala II	10 years and 6 months	94–104	5594–5604	R	Succeeded Satwa or Sutuwa on list C and reigned for 10 years with either 2, 4, 6, or 7 months.
174	Agba	6 months (Note: Taye Gabra Mariam's list states this king reigned for a full year.)	104–105	5604–5605	R	Succeeded Adgala on list C and reigned for 6 months.
175	Serada	16 years	105–121	5605–5621	R	Succeeded Germa Asfare on lists B and G.
176	Malis II (Al) Ameda I	4 years	121–125	5621–5625	R	Malik succeeded Agba on list C and reigned for 4, 6, or 7 years.; "Malik" is a Semitic word for "king".; The name Ameda or Al-Ameda appears on multiple earlier lists, but usually much later in chronological order.
177	Hakli II (Note: Known as Haqabi on Taye Gabra Mariam's list. This is likely due to a variation in the reading of the name as either "Hakli" (ሀክሊ) or "Hakabe" (ሀካቤ).); Kulu Seyon (Note: Called Nasohi Seyon instead on Tafari's list.)	6 years	125–131	5625–5631	R	Haqle succeeded Malik on list C and reigned for 13 or 14 years.; Kuelu Lasyon or Kuelu Syon succeeded Sarada on lists A, B and G.; This king was a scholar and fluent in the Greek language, but was also greedy and debauched.
178	Hakli III; Sergway	12 years	131–143	5631–5643	R	Haqle succeeded Malik on list C and reigned for 13 or 14 years.; Sarguay succeeded Kuelu Lasyon on lists A, D, and G, Germa Asfare on list B, and Germa Sor on list E.; Hakli could be the Aksumite king Zoskales, the earliest known king of Axum who ruled in c. 100. Egyptologist Henry Salt and Ethiopian scholar Sergew Hable Selassie both theorised that Zoskales was the king known as "Za Haqala" or "Za Hakale" that appears on some Ethiopian regnal lists. However, G.W.B. Huntingford felt that there is not enough evidence to support this identification.; Earlier regnal lists state Hakli reigned for 13 years.; According to Morié, this king was a conqueror and scholar who was fluent in the Greek language, and during his reign, the Ancient Greek religion became the official cult of Abyssinia, but his legacy was tarnished by debauchery and greed.
179	Demahe II; Zaray	10 years	143–153	5643–5653	R	Demahe succeeded Haqle on list C and reigned for 10 years.; Zaray succeeded Sarguay on lists A, B, D, E, and G.
180	Awtet III	2 years	153–155	5653–5655	R	Succeeded Demahe on list C and reigned for 2 years.
181	(Ela) Bagamay	7 years	155–162	5655–5662	R	Succeeded Zaray on lists A and G.; Brother of Demahe Zaray.
182	Awadu; Jan Asagad I	30 years	162–192	5662–5692	R	Aweda succeeded Awtet on list C and reigned for 30 years.; Jan Asgad succeeded Bagamay on lists A, D and G.; Morié believed this was the king whose conquests were recorded on the Monumentum Adulitanum inscription.
183	Zagun; Seyon Hegez	5 years	192–197	5692–5697	R	Zegen co-ruled with Rema according to list C, and they succeeded Aweda on this list, reigning for 4 or 8 years together.; Seyon Hegez succeeded Djan Asgad on lists A, D and G.
184	Rema; Seyon Geza	3 years	197–200	5697–5700	R	Rema co-ruled with Zegen according to list C, and they succeeded Aweda on this list, reigning for 4 or 8 years together.; Seyon Geza succeeded Djan Asgad on lists B and E.
185	Azagan II; Malbagad	7 years	200–207	5700–5707	R	Mawa'al Genh or Ma'al Ganah succeeded Seyon Hegez on lists A and D.
186	Gafale; Saba Asagad I	1 year	207–208	5707–5708	R	Gafale succeeded Zegen and Rema on list C and reigned for 1 year.; Saba Asgad succeeded Zaray on list B and Seyon Geza on list E.
187	Segay or Segayon; Besi Sark	4 years	208–212	5708–5712	R	Be'esi Sarq succeeded Gafale on list C and reigned for 4 years.
188	Gaza; Agdur I	9 years	212–221	5712–5721	R	Agdur succeeded Saf Arad on lists A, D, and G, and Seyon Geza on list B.; Known as "Graza Agdour" in a list attached at the end of the Acta of Abreha and Atsbeha found in the Axum Zion Church, which also states he reigned for 8 years, from 212 to 221.; This king may be identifiable with the Aksumite king GDRT, who reigned at some point in the early third century AD.; The name of this king could be a reference to Gaza in Palestine, which was promised by king Solomon to Makeda according to the Kebra Nagast.
189	Agduba or Agdur II; Asgwegwe	8 years	221–229	5721–5729	R	Azguagua succeeded Be'esi Sarq on list C and reigned for 76 or 77 years.; Known as "Agdour Asguagua" in a list attached at the end of the Acta of Abreha and Atsbeha found in the Axum Zion Church, which also states that he reigned for 8 years, from 221 to 229.; Some chronicles claim that a king named "Azguagua" was the son of a king named "Alada" and was converted to Christianity by Frumentius and his brother Edesius. The 1922 regnal list ignores this tradition and instead dates the conversion of Ethiopia to Christianity in the reign of Ahywa Sofya.; Peter Truhart identified this king with the Axumite king ʽDBH or "Adhebah".
190	Saweza II	1 year	229–230	5729–5730	R	Be'esi Saweza appears on list C and reigned for 1 year. His predecessor was Herka who is omitted from this list, and originally succeeded Azguagua on list C.; Brother of Agduba Asgwegwe.
191	Wakana (Queen)	2 days (Note: Taye Gabra Mariam's list states this queen reigned for 2 months instead of 2 days.)	230	5730	R	Succeeded Be'esi Saweza on list C and reigned for 2 days.
192	Hadaws	4 months	230	5730	R	Succeeded Wakana on list C and reigned for 2, 4, or 9 months.
193	(Ela San) Sagal (Note: Known as Ailassan Sagal on Tafari's list and Aslal Sen Segel on Taye Gabra Mariam's list.)	3 years	230–233	5730–5733	R	Succeeded Hadaws on list C and reigned for 3 years.; Peter Truhart identified this king as the Axumite king Zoskales and dated the beginning of his reign to c. 210 or 220.
194	Asfehi; Asfeha I	14 years	233–247	5733–5747	R	Asfeha succeeded Sagal on list C and reigned for 14 years.
195	Atsgaba; Seifa Arad I	6 years	247–253	5747–5753	R	Segab succeeded Asfeha on list C and reigned for 23 years.; Saifa Ared succeeded Mawa'al Genh on lists A, D, and G, and Agdur on list B. The name also appears on list E as the throne name of Tazer (no. 199 on this list).; According to the Tarika Nagast (History of Kings), the father of Abreha and Atsbeha was king Sayfa-Ar'ed.
196	Ayba II	17 years	253–270	5753–5770	R	Appeared on list C with 16 or 17 years of rule. He succeeded Samara (who is excluded from this list), who followed Asfeha.
197	Saham I Lakendun III	9 years	270–279	5770–5779	R	Appears on list C with 9 years of rule. He succeeded Eskendi (excluded from this part of the 1922 list and instead included in the Tribe of Kam), who followed Ayba.; Son of Ayba.
198	Segab	10 years	279–289	5779–5789	R	Succeeded Asfeha on list C and reigned for 23 years.; Peter Truhart tentatively identified this king as the Axumite king Wazeba. This identification allows for Tafari's list to match with archaeological evidence that shows that Wazeba was succeeded by Ousanas, who Truhart identified with the next king Tazer.; Truhart dated the beginning of this king's reign to c. 300 and stated his reign lasted for either 10 or 13 years.
199	Tazer; Tazena I or Wozena (Note: Known as Tazena on most versions of the list, but at least one version of Heruy Wolde Selassie's list uses "Wozena" instead.)	10 years	289–299	5789–5799	R	Tazer succeeded and appeared on lists E and F as the predecessor of Abreha and Atsbeha.; Some sources clam this king's throne name was Sayfa Arad.; Father of Abreha and Atsbeha according to a book titled Gedle Abreha and Asbeha from the Church of Abreha wa-Atsbeha.; Peter Truhart identified this king with "Ela Ameda" or Ousanas. This identification allows for Tafari's list to match with archaeological evidence that shows Ousanas was succeeded by his wife Sofya as regent before their son became king of Axum.; A king named Ameda reigned before Ahywa on list C and reigned for 30 years with 1, 6, or 8 months.
200	Ahywa; Sofya (Queen)	7 years	299–306	5799–5806	R	Ahyawa was the immediate predecessor of Abreha and Atsbeha on list C, with 3 years of rule. Tafari's regnal list notes that "her regnal name was Sofya, and she was the mother of Abreha [and] Atsbeha".; According to an unpublished history of the kings of Axum, a queen named "Ahiyewa" was the mother of Abreha and Atsbeha, and she ruled for three years during the minority of her sons.; Wife of Tazer according to Gedle Abreha and Asbeha.; An Aksumite queen named Sofya ruled Axum as regent following the death of her husband Ousanas (otherwise known as Ella Allada) in c. 330. Her son was king Ezana.; Peter Truhart dated the beginning of this queen's reign to c. 325.; Manfred Kropp theorised that the story of Queen Ahywa Sofya and her sons Abreha and Atsbeha was modeled on Roman Empress Helena and her son Constantine I, and that the traditional date of the conversion of Ethiopia to Christianity (317) is deliberately placed before the time of the First Council of Nicaea.

==== Christian Sovereigns ====
"Chronological table of the Christian sovereigns who received baptism and followed completely the law of the Gospel."

Text accompanying this section in Taye Gabra Mariam's list:
"in the 11th year these two brothers ruled, [317 E.C.] Christianity came to Ethiopia through Abba Salama Kasate [Birhan]."

Text accompanying this section in Tafari's list:
"In the year 327 [sic] after Jesus Christ – 11 years after the reign of these two sovereigns (mother and son) – the gospel was introduced to Ethiopia by Abba Salama, and the Queen Sofya, who was baptised, became a good Christian."

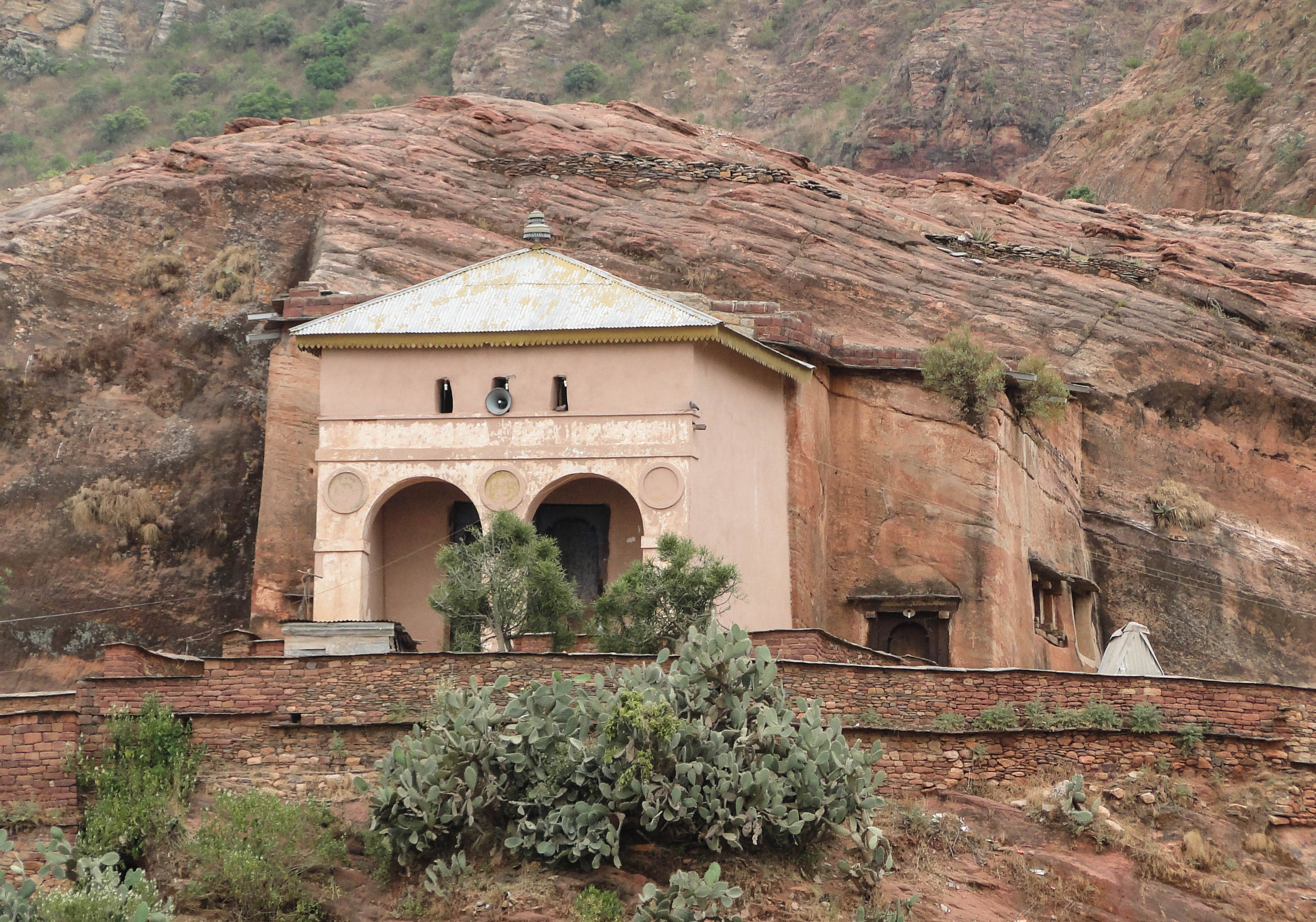
Church of Abreha and Atsbeha

Brothers Abreha and Atsbeha are often cited in tradition as the first Christian kings of Ethiopia. According to Tyrannius Rufinus, Christianity was introduced to this region by Frumentius and his brother Edesius. They were sailing down the Red Sea with a Syrian merchant named Meropius when they landed on the coast, where they were seized by the native people, who spared the two brothers and took them to the king. Frumentius was made the king's chancellor, and Edesius was made cupbearer or butler. After the king's death, the widowed queen asked both men to stay until her son was grown up, and Frumentius assisted her in ruling the kingdom. During his time in power, Frumentius had many churches built and obtained facilities to allow more trade with Christians. Years later, Frumentius asked Athanasius, the Pope of Alexandria, to send a bishop to Abyssinia to teach the Christians there who had no leader. E. A. Wallis Budge believed that the brothers had initially arrived at Adulis.

Tafari's regnal list reflects the above tradition by specifically crediting Frumentius, under the name of Aba Salama, with introducing Christianity during the rule of Queen Ahywa Sofya. According to Tyrannius Rufinus, the Axumites converted to Christianity during the reign of the Roman Emperor Constantine I (306–337).

Heruy Wolde Selassie's book Wazema provided a somewhat different explanation of the Christianisation of Ethiopia. According to him, Frumentius, known as Käsate Berhan ("Revealer of the Light (of Faith)"), went from Ethiopia to Alexandria in 309 E.C. and was appointed by Athanasius as Metropolitan of Ethiopia, where he returned in 330 and baptized the Ethiopians. Selassie also stated that according to the Synaxarium, Frumentius was sent to Egypt by Queen Sofya with letters for the Patriarch, arriving there before the Council of Nicaea (317 E.C.) but only returning to Ethiopia in 330.

Peter Truhart believed that a "period of disintegration" began with the reign of Adhana I, during which there may have been multiple reigning monarchs at the same time. Truhart dated this period to c. 375–450. E. A. Wallis Budge previously stated that he believed there were "kinglets" who ruled parts of Ethiopia between 360 and 480, separate from other lines of kings. This theory was used to explain the substantial variation among Ethiopian regnal lists. Budge identified most of the monarchs from Adhana I to Lewi as "kinglets", while the later kings were those who appear more frequently on regnal lists. John Stewart's book African States and Rulers provides alternate reign dates and succession order for the monarchs from Abreha I to Del Na'od.

This section of the list is the first to avoid using Louis J. Morié's Historie de l'Éthiopie for regnal names, order, and length. Instead, it relies almost entirely on earlier Ethiopian regnal lists.

1922 regnal list					Notes
No.	Name(s)	Reign length	Reign dates		Notes
No.	Name(s)	Reign length	E.C.	A.M.	Notes
201	Abreha I and Atsbeha I (Joint rule) (Note: Tafari's list mistakenly calls this reign the joint rule of Queen Sofya and 'Abreha Atsbeha', treating the brothers as one individual. Both Taye Gabra Mariam's list and Heruy Wolde Selassie's list confirm this reign was the joint rule of the brothers Abreha and Atsbeha.)	26 years	306–332	5806–5832	Appeared on lists A, B, C, D, E, F, and G, and reigned for 27 years and 6 months on list C.; Traditionally the first Christian monarchs of Ethiopia in the early 4th century. They appear on all Regnal lists of Ethiopia that cover the Christian period.; The names 'Abreha' and 'Atsbeha' may be corruptions of the names of Ezana and his brother Shiazana. Egyptologist Henry Salt equated Abreha with Ezana and Atsbeha with Saizana. However, E. A. Wallis Budge was sceptical of this and suggested the chroniclers deliberately avoided mentioning Ezana and Shizana and instead preferred to claim conversion took place through members of the so-called Solomonic line, which Ezana and Shizana may not have been part of.; It is known that it was Ezana who was the first king to convert to Christianity, due to the teachings of Aba Salama. Despite this, Ezana is largely absent from many Ethiopian regnal lists.; Stuart Munro-Hay theorized the story of Abreha and Atsbeha resulted from a confusion over two historical figures: the Aksumite king Kaleb, whose throne name was Ella Atsbeha, and the Aksumite general Abraha, who promoted Christianity in Yemen.; According to Tafari, it was during this joint reign that Aba Salama introduced the Gospel to Ethiopia in 327, and Queen Ahwya Sofya was baptised. Manfred Kropp argued that this date was wrong and it should be 317. Some Ethiopian traditions state that it was in the year 333 that the people converted to Christianity.; The version of this regnal list included in Heruy Wolde Selassie's Wazema dates the Christianization of Ethiopia to 327.; Alternate reign dates (Gregorian) for Ezana from John Stewart: 325–356.; Alternate reign dates (Gregorian) for Abreha and Atsbeha from John Stewart: 356–370.; Peter Truhart dated Ezana's reign to c. 339–365 (26 years).; Peter Truhart dated the beginning of Saizana's reign to c. 365 and believed he reigned 17 years.
202 (Note: The numbering on this list from this point onwards is one ahead of Tafari's list, due to his mistaken conflation of Abreha and Atsbeha as one ruler.)	Abreha I or Atsbeha I (alone) (Note: Different versions of this list conflict with each other on which of the brothers ruled for 12 years by himself. Tafari's list and Heruy Wold Selassie's list both state that it was Atsbeha who ruled by himself, while Taye Gabra Mariam argued that it was Abreha who ruled by himself.)	12 years	332–344	5832–5844	Atsbeha ruled alone according to lists A, C, and E, reigning for 12 years on list C and 15 years on list E, while Abreha ruled alone according to list B.
203	Asfeha II; Dalez	7 years	344–351	5844–5851	Asfeha succeeded Abreha and Atsbeha (joint rule) on lists B, D, and G, succeeded Atsbeha (sole rule) on lists C and E, reigning for 7 years on list C, and succeeded Abreha (sole rule) on list B.; Dalez succeeded Abreha and Atsbeha on list F.; One regnal list quoted by Pedro Páez stated Asfeha co-ruled with Arfed and Amsi, who were all brothers and divided each day into three parts so each could rule during a different part of the day.
204	Sahel II	14 years	351–365	5851–5865	Succeeded Asfeha on list C, reigning for 14 or; One tradition states that this king was a co-ruler with Abreha and Atsbeha from 356 to 370, and that each day of their joint reign was divided into three parts, so that each king was absolute during a specific part of the day.; Peter Truhart dated the beginning of this king's reign to c. 365 and theorized that he may be the same king as Saizana.
205	Arfed; Gabra Maskal I	4 years	365–369	5865–5869	Arfed succeeded Asfeha on lists A, B, D, and E. Co-ruled with Amsi according to list A.; The name Gabra Maskal appears on one version of list F following Sahel.; One regnal list quoted by Pedro Páez stated this king co-ruled with Asfeh and Amsi, who were all brothers and divided each day into three parts so each could rule during a different part of the day.; Alternate reign dates (Gregorian) from John Stewart: 370–374.
206	Adhana I (Queen)	5 years	369–374	5869–5874	Succeeded Sahel on list C, reigning for 14 years.; Name means "God renews him".; Alternate reign dates (Gregorian) from John Stewart: 374–379.
207	Riti	1 year	374–375	5874–5875	Succeeded Adhana on list C, reigning for 1 year.; Alternate reign dates (Gregorian) from John Stewart: 379–380.
208	Asfeha III	1 year	375–376	5875–5876	Succeeded Riti on list C, reigning for 1 year.; Son of Asfeha or Arfed.; Alternate reign dates (Gregorian) from John Stewart: 380–381.
209	Atsbeha II	5 years	376–381	5876–5881	Succeeded Asfeha on list C, reigning for 5 years.; Son of Asfeha.; Alternate reign dates (Gregorian) from John Stewart: 381–386.
210	Ameda II (Note: Name written as Amey on Tafari's list, but earlier regnal lists, as well as Taye Gabra Mariam's list, consistently refer to this king as "Ameda".)	15 years	381–396	5881–5896	Succeeded Atsbeha on list C, reigning for 16 years.; Second son of Asfeha.; Alternate reign dates (Gregorian) from John Stewart: 386–401.
211	Abreha II	7 months	396	5896	Succeeded Ameda on list C, reigning for 6 months.; Some earlier regnal lists state this king ruled for 6 months.; Alternate reign dates (Gregorian) from John Stewart: 401.
212	(Ela) Sahel III (Note: Name written as Ilassahl on Tafari's list.)	2 months	396	5896	Succeeded Abreha on list C, reigning for 2 months.; According to one tradition, this king was murdered by his successor Ela Gabaz. The king was known to be vain and proud and refused to allow his daughter Admas to be married to Ela Gabaz when he asked for her hand in marriage. The king died shortly after being imprisoned.; Alternate reign dates (Gregorian) from John Stewart: 401–402.
213	(Ela) Gabaz I	2 years	396–398	5896–5898	Succeeded Sahel on list C, reigning for 2 years.; One Ethiopian tradition claims that Ela Gabaz killed his predecessor and married the king's daughter named Admas before proclaiming himself king. He had previously been ordered to be executed by Sahel after asking for his daughter's hand in marriage, but rose against him with an army. Ela Gabaz later married a pagan queen named Lab, who was from a neighbouring district. This resulted in Admas's brother, Shahel (or Suhal), rising, killing both Ela Gabaz and Lab, and proclaiming himself king.; According to Morié, Ela Gobaz was the son of a district chief and his wife, named Farach, who was the daughter of a provincial governor. Gobaz had married Lab because he had conquered the country she ruled, and she was allowed to govern Ethiopia after their marriage. Gobaz's sister Ababa-Esat and their five cousins were sold as slaves to Yazdegerd I, ruler of the Sasanian Empire.; Name means "Hero of God".; Alternate reign dates (Gregorian) from John Stewart: 402–404.
214	Sahel IV (Note: Name written as Suhal on Tafari's list.)	4 years	398–402	5898–5902	Succeeded Gabaz on list C, reigning for 1 or 4 years.; Son of Sahel III.; According to one tradition, this king was the brother-in-law of Ela Gabaz and slew him to become king. E. A. Wallis Budge dated the beginning of his reign to 394.; Alternate reign dates (Gregorian) from John Stewart: 404–408.; Peter Truhart dated the beginning of this king's reign to c. 395.
215	Abreha III	10 years	402–412	5902–5912	Abreha and Adhana succeeded Sahel on list C as joint rulers for 16 years.; Alternate reign dates (Gregorian) from John Stewart: 408–418 (Abreha III) and 418–424 (Adhana II).; Peter Truhart dated the beginning of this reign to c. 400.
216	Adhana II (Queen)	6 years	412–418	5912–5918	Abreha and Adhana succeeded Sahel on list C as joint rulers for 16 years.; Alternate reign dates (Gregorian) from John Stewart: 408–418 (Abreha III) and 418–424 (Adhana II).; Peter Truhart dated the beginning of this reign to c. 400.
217	Yoab	10 years	418–428	5918–5928	Alternate reign dates (Gregorian) from John Stewart: 424–434.; Unlike other kings in this section of the list, he did not appear on earlier regnal lists. He may be the historical Axumite king Ioel. (Note: Confusion may have been caused by the reading of the names "Iyoel" (ኢዮኤል) and "Iyoab" (ኢዮአብ).)
218	Saham II	2 years	428–430	5928–5930	Succeeded Abreha and Adhana on list C, reigning for 28 or 18 years.; Alternate reign dates (Gregorian) from John Stewart: 434–436.
219	Ameda III (Note: Name written as Amey II on Tafari's list, but earlier regnal lists, as well as Taye Gabra Mariam's list, consistently refer to this king as "Ameda".)	1 year	430–431	5930–5931	Succeeded Saham on list C, reigning for 12 or 17 years.; Alternate reign dates (Gregorian) from John Stewart: 436–446.; Peter Truhart identified this king with the Axumite king Sembrouthes.; Truhart dated the beginning of this king's reign to c. 430 and believed he may have reigned for between 1 and 12 years.
220	Sahel V Ahzab	2 years	431–433	5931–5933	Succeeded Amida on list C, reigning for 2 years.; Alternate reign dates (Gregorian) from John Stewart: 446–448.
221	Sebah; Maharna Kristos I	3 years	433–436	5933–5936	Succeeded Sahel on list C, reigning for 2 years.; Alternate reign dates (Gregorian) from John Stewart: 448–451.
222	Saham III	2 years	436–438	5936–5938	Succeeded Sebah on list C, reigning for 15 years.; Alternate reign dates (Gregorian) from John Stewart: 451–466.; Stewart lists the next king, Elagabaz II, as his co-ruler from 463 to 466.
223	(Ela) Gabaz II	6 years	438–444	5938–5944	Succeeded Saham on list C, reigning for 21 or 24 years.; Alternate reign dates (Gregorian) from John Stewart: 463–474.; Stewart lists the previous king as his co-ruler from 463 to 466.; Possibly the Axumite king WʽZB who reigned during the mid 6th century, also known as "Ella Gabaz" on an inscription where he states that he is the son of "Ella Atsbeha" or king Kaleb, who is placed much further down Tafari's list.
224	Agabe	1 year	444–445	5944–5945	Agabe and Lewi succeeded Gabaz on list C, reigning together for 2 or 4 years.; Alternate reign dates (Gregorian) from E. A. Wallis Budge and John Stewart: 474–475.
225	Lewi	3 years	445–448	5945–5948	Agabe and Lewi succeeded Gabaz on list C, reigning together for 2 or 4 years.; Alternate reign dates (Gregorian) from E. A. Wallis Budge and John Stewart: 474–475.
226	Ameda IV; Yaqob I	2 years	448–450	5948–5950	Ameda succeeded Agabe and Lewi on list C, reigning for 11 years.; Yaqob succeeded Amida on list C, and co-ruled with Dawit for 3 years. The 1922 list, however, combines Amida and Yaqob as the same ruler.; Alternate reign dates (Gregorian) from John Stewart: 475–486.; John Stewart believes this king was Alla Amidas, who other historians believe reigned in the mid 6th century. Alternatively, this king may be Ousanas, also known as Ella Allada or Ella Amida, who reigned in the 4th century.; Stewart lists joint kings Jacob and David (who do not appear on Tafari's list) as ruling between Alla Amidas and Armah from 486 to 489. E. A. Wallis Budge also confirmed one Ethiopian tradition that states that Yakob (Jacob) and Dawit (David) ruled jointly for three years following Alla Amidas. Alaqa Taye called this king "Ameda III (Yacob)", seemingly combining Yakob with Alla Amidas, and Dawit being combined with Armah.
227	Armah I Dawit III	14 years	450–464	5950–5964	Armah succeeded Yaqob and Dawit on list C, reigning for 14 years, 6 or 7 months, and 7 or 8 days.; Dawit succeeded Amida on list C, and co-ruled with Yaqob for 3 years. The 1922 list, however, combines Dawit and Armah as the same ruler.; Alternate reign dates (Gregorian) from E. A. Wallis Budge and John Stewart: 489–504.; Peter Truhart stated this king ruled for between 6 and 14 years.
228	Amsi	5 years	464–469	5964–5969	Succeeded Arfed on lists B, D, and E, and co-ruled with Arfed on list A as successor of Asfeha.; Descendant of Adhana I.; According to list A, Amsi was the brother of both Asfeha and Arfed (203 and 205 on this list). The 1922 regnal list, however, rejects the tradition by moving Amsi's reign much further down in chronological order.
229	Saladoba (Note: Known as Salayba on Tafari's list.)	9 years	469–478	5969–5978	Succeeded Amsi on lists B and E, and succeeded Arad (after Amsi) on lists A and G.; Son of Amsi.; According to the Tarika Nagast (History of Kings), it was during the reign of this king that the Nine Saints arrived in Ethiopia.
230	(Al) Ameda V	8 years	478–486	5978–5986	Succeeded Saladoba on lists A, B, E, and G.; Son of Saladoba.; Dillmann and Basset identified this king with Alla Amidas, during whose reign the Nine Saints came to Ethiopia.; Peter Truhart stated this king ruled for between 8 and 30 years.
231	Tazena II; Ezana [sic] (Note: All known versions of the list use "Ezana" for this monarch, but this name refers to the much earlier king of Axum of the same name (likely the same person as Abreha I). This king is likely meant to be Zitana, father of Kaleb, according to some regnal lists.)	7 years	486–493	5986–5993	Tazena succeeded Al-Ameda on lists A, B, D, E, and G.; Zitana succeeded Armah on list C, reigning for 2 or 12 years.; Some sources state that Zitana was the father of Kaleb.; Son of Alameda II/Ellamida.; Despite sharing the same name as the Axumite king Ezana, he reigned much earlier than these dates. It is more likely this king is meant to be Tazena, father of Kaleb, the next king on this list. The king is also known by the name Zitana.; Alternate reign dates (Gregorian) from John Stewart: 504–505.; Peter Truhart called this king "Ezana II", having previously acknowledged Abreha I as the same person as Ezana of Axum.; List C states that a king named Yaqob reigned after Zitana for 9 or 12 years. This king is absent from the 1922 list. This king was sometimes called "Arwe" because of his cruelties and was defeated by 'Ella 'Asbeha, otherwise known as Kaleb. John Stewart dated the reign of "Jacob II" to 505–514.

==== From Kaleb to Gedajan ====
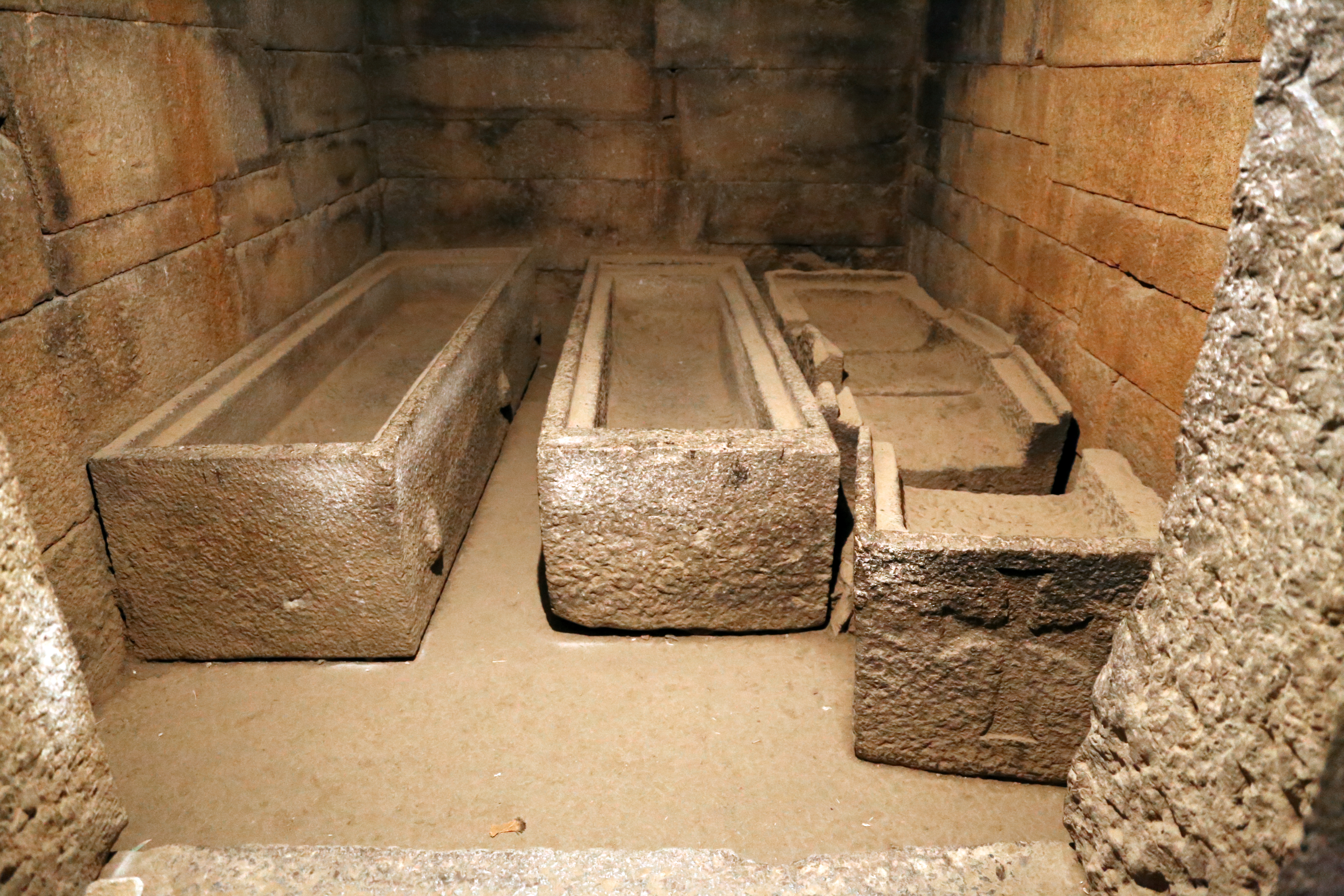
Tomb of Kaleb and Gebre Meskel in Axum.

"Dynasty of Atse (Emperor) Kaleb until Gedajan."

Tafari's version of this list marks a break with the reign of Kaleb, though earlier Ethiopian regnal lists did not do this. Tafari's list may mark a break here, as it lists Kaleb as the first 'Emperor' of Ethiopia. Louis J. Morié stated that Saint Elesbaan (another name for Kaleb) was the first to claim the title of "Emperor". However, Henry Salt believed that Menelik I was the first to use this title.

According to a text named Tarika Nagast, the kings from Kaleb to Dil Na'od were each the son of the previous king (omitting Israel, Gedajan, and Gudit from its list of kings). The text quotes the list of kings from a manuscript held in the church of Debre Damo.

1922 regnal list					Notes
No.	Name(s)	Reign length	Reign dates		Notes
No.	Name(s)	Reign length	E.C.	A.M.	Notes
232	Kaleb	30 years	493–523	5993–6023	Succeeded Tazena on lists A, B, D, E, F, and G, reigning for 30 years on list F and 40 years on list E.; On list C, he is known as Constantinos and succeeded Yaqob, who followed Zitana, and reigned for 28 years.; Son of Zitana.; Abdicated and entered a monastery. He lived for another 12 years until he died of smallpox at the age of 70.; First Abyssinian king to use the title of "Atse" or Emperor.; Alternate reign dates (Gregorian) from E. A. Wallis Budge and John Stewart: 514–542.; Peter Truhart dated this king's reign to c. 493–533.; James Bruce on the other hand stated that this king came to power in 522.
233	Za Israel	1 month (Note: Taye Gabra Mariam's list does not give a reign length and only states this king's reign is "undocumentated".)	523	6023	Successor of Constantinos/Kaleb on list C, and reigned for 1 or 8 months.; Son of Kaleb.; Governor of Adwa or Himyar before his accession to the throne.; Various sources suggest that there was a struggle for the throne between Israel and his brother Gabra Maskal after the death or abdication of their father.; One source claims that Israel usurped the throne but dropped dead when the priests announced that Kaleb had chosen Gabra Maskal as his successor.; Another source claims that Israel became the leader of the Zar cult after failing to usurp the throne after his father's abdication.; However, a different source claims that it was his brother who usurped the throne, and Israel returned to Ethiopia to try to regain it, resulting in a long-lasting conflict.; Possibly the king who made peace with Abraha and formally recognised him as king of Himyar.; Alternate reign dates (Gregorian) from John Stewart: 542–550.; Peter Truhart dated this king's reign to either 533 or 534.
–	Gebru [sic?]	1 month	523	6023	An additional king named on Taye Gabra Mariam's version of this list.; Could be Gebre Krestos, a son of Kaleb who is only recorded on one known regnal list and a Ge'ez inscription. Alternatively, this could simply be a throne name of Gebre Meskel.; This king's name could be an error.
234	Gabra Maskal II	14 years	523–537	6023–6037	Succeeded Israel on list C, reigning for 14 years, and succeeded Kaleb on lists A, B, D, E, F, and G.; Second son of Kaleb.; This king's name means "Servant of the Cross".; Alternate reign dates (Gregorian) from John Stewart: 550–564. E. A. Wallis Budge also believed that this king's reign began around 550.; Peter Truhart dated this king's reign to 534–548.; Built the Abba Garima Monastery in 560 according to Morié.
235	Kostantinos; Sahel VI	28 years	537–565	6037–6065	Succeeded Gabra Maskal on lists A, B, D, and G. Also succeeded Gabra Maskal on list E, on which he is called Yeshaq.; Eldest son of Gabra Maskal.; Alternate reign dates (Gregorian) from John Stewart: 564–578.; Peter Truhart dated this king's reign to 548–576.
236	Wasan Sagad; Maharna Kristos II	15 years	565–580	6065–6080	Succeeded Constantinos on list B and succeeded Wasan Sagad on list E.; Son of Gabra Maskal or Kostantinos.; Exiled to Arabia.; Alternate reign dates (Gregorian) from John Stewart: 578–591.; Wasan Sagad could be the king named Saifu in Chinese sources based on dating and a possible similarity in the names. Stuart Munro-Hay identified "Saifu" as a grandson of Kaleb.
237	Fere Sanay	23 years	580–603	6080–6103	Name means "the good fruit".; Succeeded Wasan Sagad on list B and Jan Asgad on lists A, D, and G.; Alternate reign dates (Gregorian) from John Stewart: 591–601.
238	Aderaz	20 years	603–623	6103–6123	Succeeded Fere Sanay on lists A, B, D, and G.; This king's reign coincided with the Muslim Migration to Abyssinia in 620 E.C..; Alternate reign dates (Gregorian) from John Stewart: 601–623.
239	Akala Wedem	8 years	623–631	6123–6131	Succeeded Aderaz on list B.; Taye Gabra Mariam stated this king reigned for 10 years, from 623 to 633 (Ethiopian dates).; Alternate reign dates (Gregorian) from John Stewart and Peter Truhart: 623–633.; This king became blind.
240	Germa Asfare II	15 years	631–646	6131–6146	Succeeded Akala Wedem on lists A, B, D, and G but directly preceded Akala Wedem on list E.; Taye Gabra Mariam stated this king reigned from 633 to 648 (Ethiopian dates).; Alternate reign dates (Gregorian) from John Stewart and Peter Truhart: 633–648.; Could be Aksumite king Gersem, who ruled at the beginning of the 7th century.
241	Zergaz	10 years	646–656	6146–6156	Succeeded Germa Asfare on lists A, B, D, and G.; Alternate reign dates (Gregorian) from John Stewart and Peter Truhart: 648–656.; Taye Gabra Mariam stated this king ruled for 8 years, from 648 to 656 (Ethiopian dates).; August Dillmann suggested this king's name was an alternate version of "Cyriacus".
242	Degna Mikael	26 years	656–682	6156–6182	Succeeded Zergaz on lists A, B, D and G but preceded Zergaz on list E.; Name means "Minister of Saint Michael".; Taye Gabra Mariam stated this king ruled for 21 years, from 656 to 677 (Ethiopian dates).; Alternate reign dates (Gregorian) from John Stewart and Peter Truhart: 656–677.; A manuscript from Debre Markos claims this ruler was a contemporary of Heraclius, though the dates on this list contradict this.
243	Baher Ekla	19 years	682–701	6182–6201	Succeeded Degna Michael on lists B and G and Zergaz on list F.; Taye Gabra Mariam stated this king ruled for 14 years, from 677 to 691 (Ethiopian dates).; Alternate reign dates (Gregorian) from John Stewart and Peter Truhart: 677–696.
244	Gum	24 years	701–725	6201–6225	Succeeded Baher Ekla on lists B, E and F.; Alternate reign dates (Gregorian) from John Stewart and Peter Truhart: 696–720.; Also known as "Hezba Seyon".
245	Asgomgum	5 years	725–730	6225–6230	Succeeded Gum on list B, E and F.; Alternate reign dates (Gregorian) from John Stewart and Peter Truhart: 720–725.
246	Latem	16 years	730–746	6230–6246	Succeeded Asguamgum on list B, E and F.; According to Alaqa Taye Gabra Mariam's History of the People of Ethiopia, it was in the tenth year of this king's reign that a second group of the Weyto tribe, who had split from the earlier group 3,100 years before and settled in Egypt and Sudan, arrived in Ethiopia.; Alternate reign dates (Gregorian) from John Stewart and Peter Truhart: 725–741.
247	Talatam	21 years	746–767	6246–6267	Succeeded Latem on lists B, E and F.; Alternate reign dates (Gregorian) from John Stewart and Peter Truhart: 741–762.
248	Gadagosh or Oda Gosh	13 years	767–780	6267–6280	Succeeded Talatam on lists B, E and F.; Alternate reign dates (Gregorian) from John Stewart and Peter Truhart: 762–775.; Also known as "Lul Sagad".
249	Ayzor; Eskikatir II (Note: Name translates to "until nooon".)	7 hours (Note: Heruy Wolde Selassie specified this king reigned for 7 hours, while Taye Gabra Mariam simply stated this king's reign lasted "until noon". Tafari's list states "half a day".)	780	6280	Succeeded Oda Gosh on lists B, E and F.; This king died due to suffocation by a crowd on the same day he was crowned, which is why it became illegal afterward to approach the emperor. A barrier was thereafter placed before the emperor to prevent this from happening again.; Alternate reign dates (Gregorian) from John Stewart and Peter Truhart: 775.; One manuscript from Gojjam claims that this king was the father of Gudit and had a wife named Makia Maryam, who was Gudit's mother. Like Tafari's list, this manuscript states that Aizar only reigned for half a day and reigned two decades before Wudme Asfare (who is claimed to be Gudit's grandfather in other sources).
250	Dedem	5 years	780–785	6280–6285	Succeeded Ayzur on lists B, E and F.; Name means "new blood".; Alternate reign dates (Gregorian) from John Stewart and Peter Truhart: 775–780.; Also known as "Almaz Sagad".
251	Wededem	10 years	785–795	6285–6295	Succeeded Dedem on lists B and F.; Alternate reign dates (Gregorian) from John Stewart and Peter Truhart: 780–790.
252	Wudme Asfare	30 years	795–825	6295–6325	Succeeded Wededem on lists B and E.; Some chronicles claim this king ruled or lived for 150 years.; An unpublished chronicle from Axum states that this king was the grandfather of Gudit through his daughter.; Ethiopian historian Sergew Hable Selassie estimated that Wudme Asfare's 30-year reign took place from 792 to 822 AD. Selassie felt that the actual reign dates could differ by as much as 100 years compared to written sources.; According to Morié, this king governed as a tyrant and was assassinated by a Muslim named Sindbad, who crushed his head with a large stone while he slept after getting drunk.; Alternate reign dates (Gregorian) from John Stewart and Peter Truhart: 790–820.
253	Armah II	5 years	825–830	6325–6330	Succeeded Wedem Asfare on lists B and E.; Also known as "Remha" or "Rema".; According to Morié, Ethiopia suffered from plague, famine, and war during this king's reign. The king was also contemporary with Pope Jacob of Alexandria, who ordained Abuna Yohannes as the head of the Ethiopian Orthodox Church, but he was forced to go back to Egypt.; Alternate reign dates (Gregorian) from John Stewart and Peter Truhart: 820–825.
254	Degnajan	19 years and 1 month (Note: Tafari's list does not add month to this king's reign.)	830–849	6330–6349	Succeeded Armah on lists B and E.; At least one version of list B stated he reigned for 12 years.; Knud Tage Anderson estimated this king's reign lasted from c. 925 to c. 945. One tradition claims this king died of thirst while visiting an Arab country.; Alternate reign dates (Gregorian) from John Stewart and Peter Truhart: 825–845.
255	Gedajan	10 months (Note: Reigned for a full year according to Tafari's list.>)	849–850	6349–6350	Succeeded Degna Djan on list B.; At least one version of list B stated he reigned for 9 years.; Possibly an alternate name for Degnajan.; One tradition claims that Gedajan or Gidajan was the name of Anbase Wedem before he became king.; Alternate reign dates (Gregorian) from John Stewart: 845–846.

==== Queen Gudit and her successors ====
"Of the Reign of Gudit."

Taye Gabra Mariam's list did not insert a break between Tazena and Kaleb and instead inserted one between Gedajan and Gudit. According to legend, Gudit was a Jewish queen who usurped the throne for 40 years and destroyed churches in Axum. According to some traditions and regnal lists, she brought an end to the old Aksumite line and reigned after Dil Na'od. However some lists treat her reign as an interruption before the line was restored after her death. This regnal list follows the latter tradition and continues with two further kings of the old line before the Zagwe dynasty comes to power. Some traditions hold that Gudit is descended from the Aksumite line.

Tafari's version of the list includes these three monarchs at the end of the previous section "Dynasty of Atse (Emperor) Kaleb until Gedajan" despite the heading clearly naming Gedajan as the end of this line.

1922 regnal list					Notes
No.	Name(s)	Reign length	Reign dates		Notes
No.	Name(s)	Reign length	E.C.	A.M.	Notes
256	Gudit (Queen)	40 years	850–890	6350–6390	Also known as Esato, which means "Fire". A regnal list quoted by Pedro Páez stated that Esato was a Jewish queen who reigned in Amhara while Gudit was a different queen who reigned in Tigray for 40 years and destroyed Churches in the region. However, a different list quoted by August Dillmann instead claimed that Esato and Gudit were the same woman, and that the names were what they were known as in Amhara and Tigray respectively.; Sometimes known as Terdai Gobaz. However, a list quoted by August Dillmann named her separately from Gudit/Esato and lists her after Del Naad and directly before the Zagwe dynasty. This suggests that Terdai Gobaz is the same person as Masoba Warq.; Moved the capital of Ethiopia to Lasta after sacking Axum.; Some Ethiopian traditions state that Gudit was a granddaughter of Wudme Asfare.; Also known as Yodït, which may have been her real name. The name "Gudit" is likely a nickname, as it means "the freak, the monster, the unnatural or unusual or surprising or strange one".; Knud Tage Anderson argued that Gudit was the same woman as Masoba Warq, a daughter of Del Naad who married Mara Takla Haymanot, the founder of the Zagwe dynasty. However, he notes that a crucial difference is that Gudit is considered to be the predecessor of Anbase Wedem while Masoba Warq followed Dil Na'od, the last Axumite king.; Scottish traveler James Bruce noted a version of the story of Gudit in which she was a cousin of Mara Takla Haymanot, who took over the rule of Ethiopia following the reigns of Gudit's successors and founded the Zagwe dynasty. Bruce also recorded one legend that stated that Gudit was a princess and the wife of a governor of the district of Bugna who wanted to overthrow the Christian religion and place her infant son on the throne. According to this version of the story, Gudit had 400 royal princes killed, and Del Naad (who was an infant) was taken to Shewa as the last survivor of his line.; Pedro Páez and Manuel de Almeida mentioned a different version of the legend where Gudit was a woman who ruled the kingdom of Tigray for 40 years, destroying all the churches there and was followed by Anbase Wedem. A different queen named Esato was said to have ruled in Amhara and was part of "a generation of traitors". Esato however does not appear on the 1922 regnal list.; Yet another legend claims that Gudit was a poor girl who came to Axum and became a prostitute. A priest who slept with her stole a piece of golden curtain from the Siyon church's treasury, turned it into golden shoes, and gave them to her. The priest was declared innocent of this theft because Gudit was blamed for tempting him, and she was then punished to have her right breast removed and be exiled. She met a Jewish Syrian prince named Zanobis, who pitied her and married her; she then converted to Judaism. Together, they destroyed the city of Axum and were able to do so because the king, Degnajan, had perished of thirst while visiting an Arab country.; Gudit's historicity is confirmed in the writings of the traveller Ibn Hawqal, who mentions that Ethiopia (called "the country of the Habasha") had been ruled by a woman for many years by the time of his visit and that she assumed power after killing the previous king. Ibn Hawqal's travels took place between 943 and 977, which would mean that Gudit's reign is dated later than what is suggested on this list. Ibn Hawqal stated the queen had ruled for around 30 years by the time of his travels, meaning her reign began by 947 at the latest.; A chronicle called History of the Patriarchs of the Egyptian Church also confirms Gudit's historicity. The chronicle quotes a letter written in c. 980 to the patriarch of Alexandria that refers to a "Queen of the Bani al-Hamwiah" who imprisoned many Ethiopians and destroyed churches. The Ethiopian king had also been driven out. The queen's reign came to an end when the patriarch Philotheos sent a new Metropolitan bishop to Ethiopia.; Knud Tage Anderson argued that the negative portrayal of Gudit was a creation of later times. He believed that Gudit/Yodit had been a member of the royal family and had taken power after the disappearance of King Degnajan's army and his death of thirst in Arabia. He also argued that she may have saved the country from political disaster, just as the biblical Judith had saved her people from disaster. He noted that Ibn Haqwal's description of Gudit/Yodit was positive and even in admiration of this queen.; E. A. Wallis Budge dated Gudit's accession to roughly 300 years before the beginning of Yekuno Amlak's reign (c. 970).; Taddesse Tamrat dated the beginning of Gudit's reign to c. 945.; Alternate reign dates (Gregorian) from John Stewart: 846–885.; Sometimes known as "Ga'wa", but this is likely a conflation with the much later Tigray queen Ga'ewa from the sixteenth century.
257	Anbase Wedem	20 years	890–910	6390–6410	Succeeded Degna Djan on lists A, D, E, and G and Geda Djan on list B.; Last ruler of Axum before the Zagwe dynasty according to list A.; One tradition states he succeeded his father Degnajan but roamed from mountain to mountain to escape Gudit.; According to Taye Gabra Mariam's History of the People of Ethiopia, this king took revenge against the Ethiopian Jews after they had helped Gudit burn churches in Aksum and overthrow the kingdom. (Note: Gabra Maryam) A group of Jews had entered Ethiopia from Egypt before Gudit's reign.; Peter Truhart stated this king had been a "pretender" to the throne from 875 until his accession in 885.; Alternate reign dates (Gregorian) from John Stewart: 885–905.
258	Dil Naad; Maday	10 years	910–920	6410–6420	Succeeded Anbasa Wedem on lists B, D, E, and G, reigning for 40 years on list E.; Last ruler of Axum according to lists B, D, E, F, and G.; Son of Anbase Wedem according to the Tarika Nagast.; Some traditions, however, state he was a son of Degennajan and a younger brother of Anbase Wedem.; Maiday is a name that appears on some regnal lists, usually those which name further Axumite kings after Del Naad.; Alternate reign dates (Gregorian) from John Stewart: 905–c. 950.; James Bruce stated that this king's reign ended in 960.; Henry Salt dated the end of this king's reign to c. 925.

=== Zagwe Dynasty ===
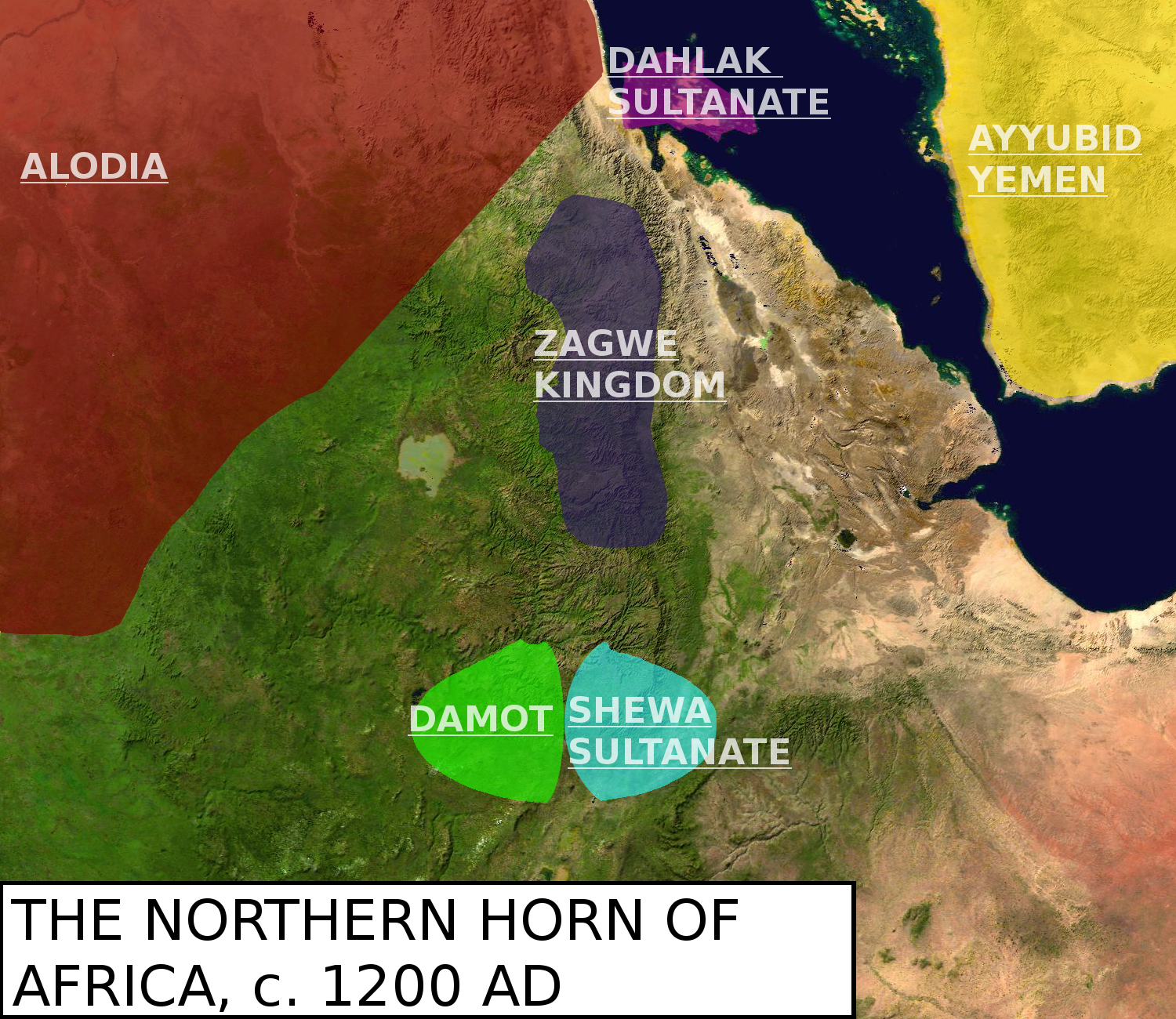
The Zagwe kingdom in c. 1200

"Sovereigns issued from Zagwe."

This dynasty was of Agaw descent and assumed power after the Aksumite line ended. In Ethiopian tradition, they are not considered to be descendants of Solomon and are therefore considered illegitimate, being omitted from some regnal lists altogether. Ghelawdewos Araia disagreed with the idea that the Zagwe kings were usurpers and instead argued that they "continued the material and spiritual culture" of Axum. Sergew Hable Selassie noted that lists of Zagwe kings often fall into three categories, which he called the "short", "long", and "longer" versions, which contain 5, 9, 11, or 16 names. The total duration of the Zagwe dynasty ranges from 143 to 354 years across these lists. The 1922 list uses the "long" version with 11 names and totals 333 years for this dynasty.

Carlo Conti Rossini theorized that the Zagwe dynasty was founded shortly before 1150, rather than in the 10th century. James Bruce theorized that five kings of this dynasty were Jewish and descendants of Gudit, while the other six kings were Christians and originated from Lasta. Bruce specifically named Tatadim, Jan Seyum, Germa Seyum, Harbai and Mairari as the "Pagan" or Jewish kings, while Mara Takla Haymanot, Kedus Harbe, Yetbarak, Lalibela, Yemrehana Krestos and Na'akueto La'ab (in these chronological orders) were Christians.

One tradition claims that Na'akueto La'ab abdicated the throne in favour of Yekuno Amlak. If this were the case, then, according to Budge's theory, the dynasty may have continued to claim the title of Negus until c. 1330, with their descendants governing Lasta for centuries thereafter.

The following list includes seven consecutive kings ruling for 40 years each. This is also reported in other regnal lists, although there is no definitive evidence that these seven kings ruled for exactly this number of years. The suspiciously round numbers given for their reign lengths suggest certain gaps in Ethiopia's history that were filled in by extending the reigns of the Zagwe kings. See Zagwe regnal lists for more information on the alternate lines of succession for this dynasty.

1922 regnal list					Notes
No.	Name(s)	Reign length	Reign dates		Notes
No.	Name(s)	Reign length	E.C.	A.M.	Notes
259	Mara Takla Haymanot; Zagwe	13 years	920–933	6420–6433	Reigned for 3, 15, or 40 years according to some earlier lists.; Ethiopian traditions differ on the exact circumstances around the rise of the Zagwe dynasty. One tradition states that Mara married Masoba Warq, a daughter of Dil Na'od, and overthrew him to become king. According to this tradition, Mara Takla Haymanot was a high-ranking official before taking the throne.; Another tradition states that Dil Na'od was instead overthrown by Gudit, and she was succeeded by several of her own family before her cousin Mara ascended to the throne.; Knud Tage Anderson argued that Masoba Warq and Gudit were the same woman.; According to Taye Gabra Mariam's History of the People of Ethiopia, the Oromo people arrived in Ethiopia in the tenth year of this king's reign.; According to Morié, this king moved the capital to Roha, which later became Lalibela. It was during this king's reign that a new Abuna was ordained by Coptic Patriarch Philotheos for the Ethiopian Orthodox Church.
260	Tatawdem	40 years	933–973	6433–6473	Elder son of Mara Takla Haymanot.; Reigned for 10 years according to some earlier lists.; E. A. Wallis Budge dated the reigns of the first two kings of this dynasty to c. 992–1030 based on the reign lengths of 3 and 40 years that are given for these kings on some regnal lists.; Name means "Blood of the Sun".; According to Morié, the Abuna Daniel refused to crown Tatadim upon his accession due to considering him a usurper. This resulted in Tatadim asking Philotheos for a new Abuna, but this could not be done without the consent of the current Abuna. Abuna Daniel was later thrown in prison by the vizier of the Fatimid Caliph al-Hakim bi-Amr Allah of Egypt.
261	Jan Seyum	40 years	973–1013	6473–6513	Son of Mara Takla Haymanot.; Reigned for 20 years according to some lists.; Name means "Fear of the Divine majesty".; According to Morié, this king had a wife named Masqal Gabra, and they had three children, two sons named Kedus Harbe and Lalibala and one daughter.
262	Germa Seyum	40 years	1013–1053	6513–6553	Son of Mara Takla Haymanot.; Reigned for 20 years according to some lists.; Name means "Fear of the Divine name".
263	Yemrhana Kristos	40 years	1053–1093	6553–6593	Son of Germa Seyum.; Name means "May Christ forgive us".; According to Morié, in 1060 Pope Cyril II of Alexandria ordained Abuna Sawiros as the head of the Ethiopian Orthodox Church after being forced to do so by Badr al-Jamali, the vizier of Caliph al-Mustansir Billah in Egypt. The Pope had initially chosen a different man named Cyril, but he was accused by Badr al-Jamali as bringing Muslims into his home for drinking wine, which is forbidden in Islam. The Pope then sent a different man named Severus, who Morié describes as a "protege" of Badr al-Jamali. Upon the arrival of Severus, Bishop Cyril took his belongings and fled to Dahlak, only to be found and sent to Cairo in 1086 to be executed. Severus attempted to convert Abyssinia to Islam and had seven mosques built, but these were later demolished.; Morié dated his birth to 1030 and his death at the age of 80 to 1110.
264	Kedus Arbe (Note: Known as Saint Arbe on Taye Gabra Mariam's list.)	40 years	1093–1133	6593–6633	Son of Jan Seyum.; Name means "Holy Warrior".; Had a son named Na'akueto La'ab with a Lasta princess.
265	Lalibala	40 years	1133–1173	6633–6673	Son of Jan Seyum.; His throne name was Gebre Meskel.
266	Nacuto Laab	40 years	1173–1213	6673–6713	Son of Kedus Harbe.; Reigned for 48 years according to some earlier lists.; This king's name means "Let us give thanks to the Father".; According to Morié, the king usurped the throne after the death of Lalibala and later died at the age of 70 in 1268.
267	Yatbarak	17 years	1213–1230	6713–6730	Son of Lalibala.; Reigned for 9 or 40 years according to some earlier lists.; Heruy Wolde Selassie believed this king was the last of the Zagwe line.; E. A. Wallis Budge theorized this king died in c. 1290 after a reign of 22 years if the tradition of Na'akueto La'ab abdicating in favour of Yekuno Amlak is to be believed.
268	Mayrari	15 years	1230–1245	6730–6745	Son of Yetbarak.; E. A. Wallis Budge theorized that this king died in c. 1308 after a reign of 15 or 18 years if the tradition of Na'akueto La'ab abdicating in favour of Yekuno Amlak is to be believed.
269	Harbay	8 years	1245–1253	6745–6753	Taye Gabra Mariam stated this king ruled for 10 years, from 1245 to 1255.; E. A. Wallis Budge theorized that this king died in c. 1330 after a reign of 20 or 23 years if the tradition of Na'akueto La'ab abdicating in favour of Yekuno Amlak is to be believed.; Possibly the same king as Kedus Harbe.

==== Claimants during the Zagwe period ====
The Shewa province in Ethiopia

"Chronological table of the 8 generations of an Israelitish dynasty, who were not raised to the throne, during the period of the reign of the posterity of the Zagwe."

This section does not appear in Taye Gabra Mariam's version of the list but is included in Tafari's. Tafari, however, provided no background information, reign dates, or lengths for this line of kings. E. A. Wallis Budge explained these kings reigned at Shewa and were descendants of Dil Na'od. Henry Salt likewise noted the Axumite royal family fled to Shewa after Axum was destroyed by Gudit and reigned there for 330 years until the accession of Yekuno Amlak.

A manuscript from Dabra Libanos included a list that numbered a total of 44 kings and a woman named Masoba Warq. In some traditions, Masoba Warq, whose name means "golden basket", is claimed to be a daughter of Dil Na'od who married Mara Takla Haymanot. She supposedly married him against her father's will, and together they took the throne.

A different regnal list from Debre Damo lists all of these kings as rulers of the Zagwe dynasty instead. This list begins the dynasty with a king named "Zagwe", followed by king named "Del Na'ad" (apparently different from the Axumite king of the same name) and then provides the following eight kings as his successors.

The description of this dynasty as an "Israelitish" dynasty refers to the Ethiopian monarchy's claimed descent from Solomon. Yekuno Amlak would claim his descent from king Solomon through this line of kings (see Emperors of Ethiopia Family Tree).

Each king is the son of the previous one.

Name	Notes
Mahbara Wedem	Son of Dil Na'od.; The Debre Damo regnal list instead claims this king's father was called Del Na'ad, but was a different man from the Axumite king of the same name.; Peter Truhart dated the beginning of this king's reign to c. 920 while Louis J. Morié believed his reign did not begin until after 980.; Name means "blood abundant in riches".
Agba Seyon	Name means "Restore Zion".
Senfa Arad	Morié dated this king's reign to c. 1110.
Nagash Zare	Name means "Royal seed".; Peter Truhart dated this king's reign to after 1000.; Morié dated this king's reign to c. 1150–1190 and claimed he sent an embassy to Pope Alexander III in 1177.
Asfeh	Peter Truhart dated this king's reign to after 1000.; Morié dated this king's reign to c. 1200.
Yakob	Son of Asfeh.
Bahar Asagad	Name means "Venerable as the sea" or "Who guards the sea".; Peter Truhart dated this king's reign to after 1100.; Henry Salt listed an additional king named "Asgud" between Bahr Asagad and Edem Asagad. Morié also mentioned a king named "Asged" who, on some regnal lists, was confused with his predecessor under the name "Birasgud-Asgud".
Edem Asagad	Reigned directly before Yekuno Amlak.; Peter Truhart dated this king's reign to c. 1210–1255.; Morié believed this king died in either 1255 or 1258.

=== Dynasty of Yekuno Amlak ===
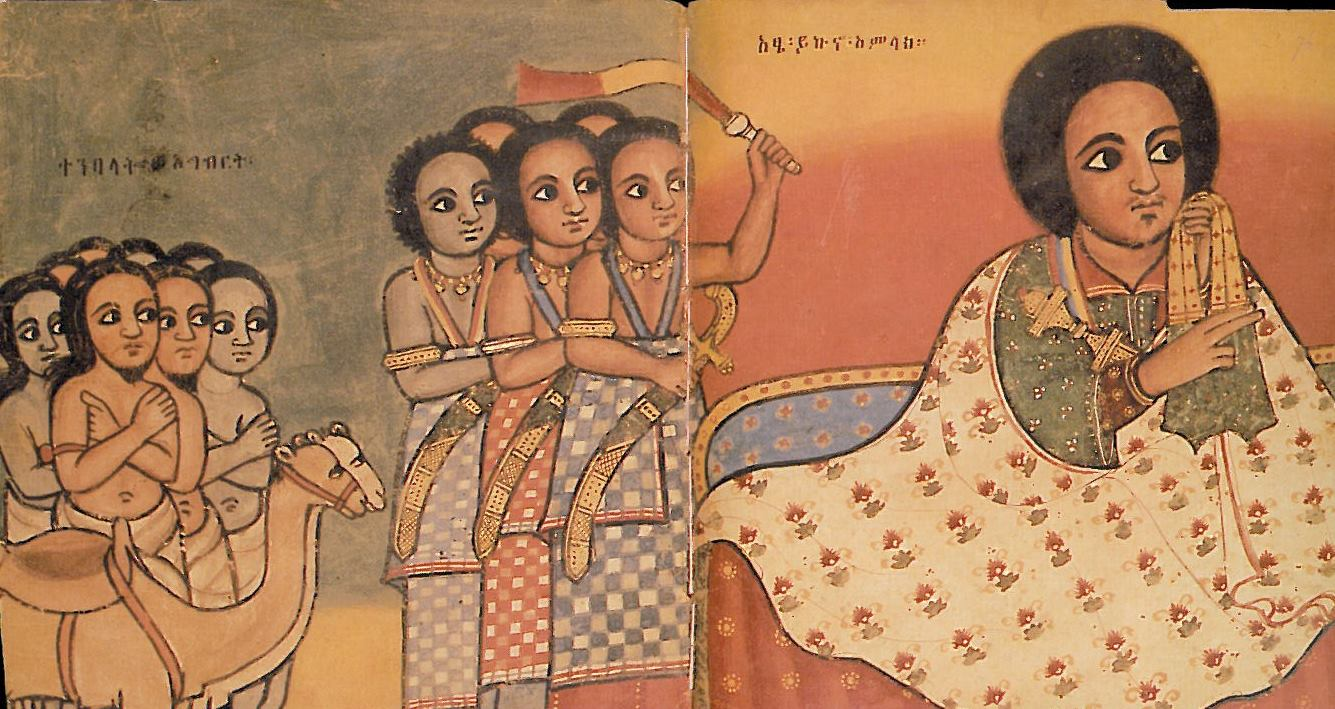
17th century painting of Yekuno Amlak.

Heading on Tafari Makonnen's List:
"Chronological table of the sovereigns from Yekuno Amlak, Emperor, and of his posterity, all issued from the ancient dynasties which were raised to the throne".

Heading on Taya Gabra Mariam's List:
"Reign of As'e Yekuno Amlak and his descendants".

Emperor Yekuno Amlak defeated the last king of the Zagwe dynasty in 1270 (G.E.). His dynasty claimed descent from Solomon, Makeda, and Menelik I through the line of kings of Shewa who reigned during the Zagwe period and were themselves descended from Dil Na'od.

Historian Manfred Kropp was sceptical of the way this dynasty is often referred to as the "Solomonic" or "Solomonid" dynasty, which he believes was a creation of European Renaissance scholars. He noted that Ethiopian chronicles refer to the throne of the monarchy as the "Throne of David", not Solomon. The 1922 regnal list makes no direct reference to this dynasty being called the "Solomonic" line, only that it was descended from earlier ancient dynasties.

The so-called Solomonic dynasty is historically verified. Still, the dates on this regnal list do not always align with the dates generally accepted by historians, even when accounting for the 7- or 8-year gap between the Ethiopian calendar and the Gregorian calendar. The page for the List of Emperors of Ethiopia contains the conventional dates used by historians for the reigns of individual monarchs.

1922 regnal list					Notes
No.	Name	Reign length	Reign dates		Notes
No.	Name	Reign length	E.C.	A.M.	Notes
270	Yekuno Amlak	15 years	1253–1268	6753–6768	Son of Edem Asagad.; Name means "There shall be to him sovereignty".; While many historians accept that Yekuno Amlak became ruler of Ethiopia after defeating the last Zagwe king at the Battle of Ansata, James Bruce related a different tradition where the monk Tekle Haymanot persuaded Na'akueto La'ab to abdicate in favour of Yekuno Amlak, who was reigning at Shewa, where a line of princes from Dil Na'od had continued to rule after the original Solomonic line was deposed by Gudit.; Taye Gabra Mariam stated this king ruled for 13 years, from 1255 to 1268.
271	Yagbeo Seyon	9 years	1268–1277	6768–6777	Son of Yekuno Amlak.; Name means "He [God] shall bring back Zion".
272	Senfa Arad II	1 year	1277–1278	6777–6778	Son of Yagbe'u Seyon.; E. A. Wallis Budge called this king Senfa 'Ar'ed IV, acknowledging the reigns of Akaptah Tsenfa Ared (no. 167), Atsgaba Seifa Arad (no. 195), and the unnumbered Tsinfa Arad from the Israelite dynasty on Tafari's list.
273	Hesba Asagad	1 year	1278–1279	6778–6779	Son of Yagbe'u Seyon.
274	Qedma Asagad	1 year	1279–1280	6779–6780	Son of Yagbe'u Seyon or Yekuno Amlak.
275	Jan Asagad II	1 year	1280–1281	6780–6781	Son of Yagbe'u Seyon.; Name means "venerable majesty".
276	Saba Asagad II	1 year	1281–1282	6781–6782	Son of Yagbe'u Seyon.; E. A. Wallis Budge called this king Sab'a Asgad (II), acknowledging the reign of Gafali Seb Asagad (no. 186).
277	Wedma Arad	15 years	1282–1297	6782–6797	Son of Yekuno Amlak.
278	Amda Seyon I	30 years	1297–1327	6797–6827	Son of Wedem Arad.; Name means "Pillar of Zion".
279	Saifa Arad II	28 years	1327–1355	6827–6855	Son of Amda Seyon I.; More commonly known as Newaya Krestos. "Saifa Ared" was his throne name.; 'Newaya Krestos' means "Vessel of Christ".
280	Wedma Asfare	10 years	1355–1365	6855–6865	Son of Newaya Krestos.; More commonly known as Newaya Maryam. "Wedma Asfare" was his throne name.
281	Dawit IV	30 years	1365–1395	6865–6895	Son of Newaya Krestos.
282	Tewodros I	4 years	1395–1399	6895–6899	Son of Dawit I.
283	Yishaq	15 years	1399–1414	6899–6914	Son of Dawit I.
284	Andreyas	6 months	1414	6914	Son of Yeshaq I.
285	Hezba Nan	4 years and 6 months	1414–1418	6914–6918	Son of Dawit I.; More commonly known as Takla Maryam. "Hezbe Nañ" was his throne name.; 'Takla Maryam' means 'Plant of Mary'.
286	Badel Nan	6 months	1418–1419	6918–6919	Son of Takla Maryam.; This emperor's actual name was "Sarwe Iyasus" and his throne name is usually known to be "Mehreka Nan". The name "Badel Nan" is, however, used in some sources, such as a manuscript held in the Debre Damo monastery.; "Sarwe Iyasus" means "Prop of Jesus".; Taye Gabra Mariam stated this king ruled for 1 year and 6 months, from 1418 to 1419.
287	Amda Iyasu (Note: Mistakenly named Amde Tseyon on Tafari's list.)	7 years	1419–1426	6919–6926	Son of Takla Maryam.; This emperor is usually known as "Amda Iyasus"; however, some sources, such as a manuscript held in Debre Damo, give the name "Amda Seyon".; Amda Iyasus likely only reigned for less than a year, but some sources have listed a longer 7-year reign.
288	Zara Yaqob	34 years	1426–1460	6926–6960	Son of Dawit I.
289	Baida Maryam (Note: Known as Bede Mariam on Taye Gabra Mariam's list.)	10 years	1460–1470	6960–6970	Son of Zara Yaqob.; "Baeda Maryam" means "he who is in the hand of Mary".
290	Eskender	16 years and 5 months (Note: Tafari's list does not list any additional months to the reign years.)	1470–1486	6970–6986	Son of Baeda Maryam I.
291	Amda Seyon II	1 year and 6 months (Note: Tafari's list does not list any additional months to the reign years.)	1486–1487	6986–6987	Son of Eskender.
292	Naod	13 years	1487–1500	6987–7000	Son of Baeda Maryam I.

==== The Ethiopian-Adal war ====
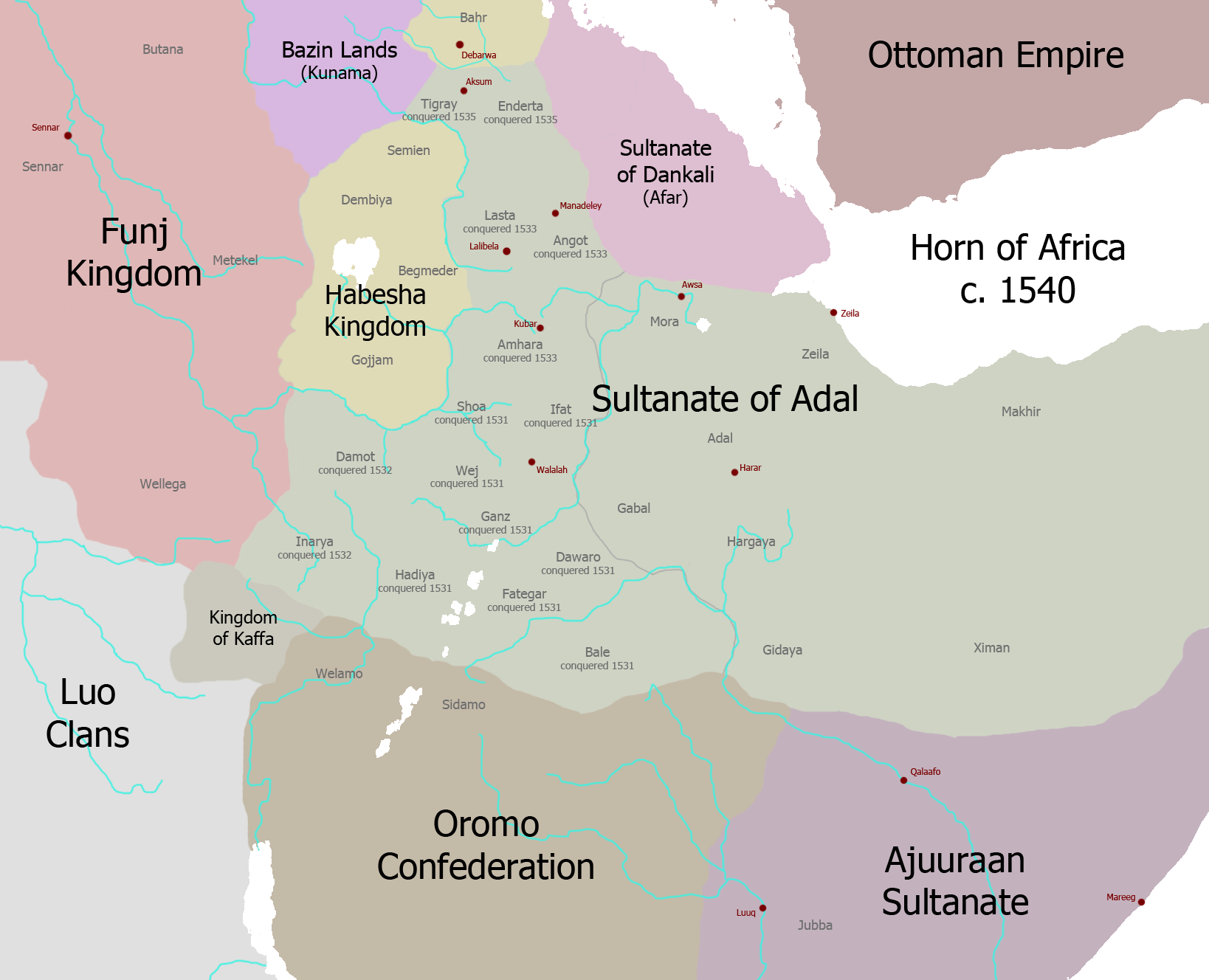
The Horn of Africa in c. 1540, at the height of the Ethiopian-Adal war.

Text accompanying this section on Tafari's list:

- "Elevation to the throne of Atse (Emperor) Lebna Dengel, and the invasion of Ethiopia by Gran"
- "Fifteen years after Atse (Emperor) Lebna Dengel came to the throne Gran devastated Ethiopia for fifteen years."

The following three kings were placed in a separate section on Tafari's list, likely because Ahmad ibn Ibrahim al-Ghazi conquered three-quarters of Ethiopia during this period. Taye Gabra Mariam's list, however, made no such break.

Tafari's list states that 15 years after Lebna Dengel ascended the throne, "Gran devastated Ethiopia for fifteen years". Taye Gabra Mariam used the same dating. Historians, however, accept the Gregorian dates for the Ethiopian–Adal war as 1529–1543, beginning 22 years after the start of Lebna Dengel's reign instead.

1922 regnal list					Notes
No.	Name	Reign length	Reign dates		Notes
No.	Name	Reign length	E.C.	A.M.	Notes
293	Lebna Dengel	32 years	1500–1532	7000–7032	Son of Na'od.; "Lebna Dengel" means "incense of the virgin".; Taye Gabra Mariam stated this king ruled for 30 years, from 1500 to 1530. This results in all kings until Sarsa Dengel having their reign dates pushed back by 2 years compared to Tafari's list.
294	Galawdewos	19 years	1532–1551	7032–7051	Son of Lebna Dengel.
295	Minas	4 years	1551–1555	7051–7055	Son of Lebna Dengel.

==== Gondarine period ====
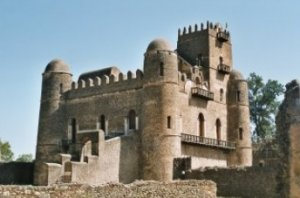
Fasil Ghebbi in Gondar, founded by Emperor Fasilides

Gondar was chosen by Emperor Fasilides to be the capital of the Ethiopian empire in 1636. The so-called "Gondarine period" usually refers to the period between Fasilides' accession in 1632 and the Zemene Mesafint in 1769. Some historians choose to begin the "Gondarine line" of the Solomonic dynasty with Susenyos I.

Tafari's version of this regnal list places the rulers from Sarsa Dengel to Tekle Giyorgis I into a separate dynasty called the "House of Gondar". The emperors from Sarsa Dengel to Za Dengel were grouped with the Gondarine emperors likely because Sarsa Dengel moved the centre of the Ethiopian empire away from Shewa to the Begemder province, where Gondar is located. Taye Gabra Mariam's version of this list did not place these emperors into a separate dynasty and instead simply stated that Fasilides founded Gondar.

The two versions of this list by Tafari Makonnen and Taye Gabra Mariam differ noticeably in the dating of the Gondarine monarchs' reigns. The table below contains both sets of dates.

The regnal list omitted Susenyos II, who reigned briefly in 1770 (G.C.). Susenyos II was said to be an illegitimate son of Iyasu II, but his claims were dubious, and this is the most likely reason for his omission.

1922 regnal list					Notes
No.	Name(s)	Reign length	Reign dates		Notes
No.	Name(s)	Reign length	E.C.	A.M.	Notes
296	Sarsa Dengel	34 years	1555–1589 (T.M.); 1553–1587 (G.M.)	7055–7089 (T.M.); 7053–7087 (G.M.)	Son of Menas.; "Sarsa Dengel" means "sprout of the virgin".
297	Yaqob II	9 years (T.M.); 7 years (G.M.)	1589–1598 (T.M.); 1587–1594 (G.M.)	7089–7098 (T.M.); 7087–7094 (G.M.)	Son of Sarsa Dengel.; Yakob's reign was divided into 2 parts, interrupted by the brief reign of Za Dengel. However, this regnal list places Za Dengel as a direct successor at the end of Yakob's uninterrupted 9-year reign.
298	Za Dengel	1 year	1598–1599 (T.M.); 1594–1595 (G.M.)	7098–7099 (T.M.); 7094–7095 (G.M.)	Nephew of Sarsa Dengel.
299	Susenyos	28 years	1599–1627 (T.M.); 1595–1623 (G.M.)	7099–7127 (T.M.); 7095–7123 (G.M.)	Grandson of Lebna Dengel.
300	Fasil	35 years (T.M.); 36 years (G.M.)	1627–1662 (T.M.); 1623–1659 (G.M.)	7127–7162 (T.M.); 7123–7159 (G.M.)	Son of Susenyos I.
301	Yohannes I (Note: Known as Degu-Johannis on Tafari's list, meaning "Yohannes the Good". Known as Yohannes the Kind on Taye Gabra Mariam's list.)	15 years	1662–1677 (T.M.); 1659–1674 (G.M.)	7162–7177 (T.M.); 7159–7174 (G.M.)	Son of Fasilides.
302	Adyam Sagad; Iyasu I	25 years (T.M.); 24 years (G.M.)	1677–1702 (T.M.); 1674–1698 (G.M.)	7177–7202 (T.M.); 7174–7198 (G.M.)	Son of Yohannes I.
303	Takla Haymanot I	2 years	1702–1704 (T.M.); 1698–1700 (G.M.)	7202–7204 (T.M.); 7198–7200 (G.M.)	Son of Iyasu I.
304	Tewoflos	3 years	1704–1707 (T.M.); 1700–1703 (G.M.)	7204–7207 (T.M.); 7200–7203 (G.M.)	Son of Fasilides.
305	Yostos	4 years (T.M.); 5 years (G.M.)	1707–1711 (T.M.); 1703–1708 (G.M.)	7207–7211 (T.M.); 7203–7208 (G.M.)	Great-grandson of Yohannes I.
306	Dawit V	5 years	1711–1716 (T.M.); 1708–1713 (G.M.)	7211–7216 (T.M.); 7208–7213 (G.M.)	Son of Iyasu I.
307	Bakaffa	9 years	1716–1725 (T.M.); 1713–1722 (G.M.)	7216–7225 (T.M.); 7213–7222 (G.M.)	Son of Iyasu I.
308	Alam Sagad or Birhan Sagad; Iyasu II	24 years (T.M.); 25 years (G.M.)	1725–1749 (T.M.); 1722–1747 (G.M.)	7225–7249 (T.M.); 7222–7247 (G.M.)	Son of Bakaffa.
309	Iyoas	15 years	1749–1764 (T.M.); 1747–1762 (G.M.)	7249–7264 (T.M.); 7247–7262 (G.M.)	Son of Iyasu II.
310	Yohannes II	5 months and 5 days (T.M.); 5 months (G.M.)	1764 (T.M.); 1762 (G.M.)	7264 (T.M.); 7262 (G.M.)	Son of Iyasu I.
311	Takla Haymanot II	8 years (T.M.); 7 years and 7 months (G.M.)	1764–1772 (T.M.); 1762–1770 (G.M.)	7264–7272 (T.M.); 7262–7270 (G.M.)	Son of Yohannes II.
312	Salomon	2 years	1772–1774 (T.M.); 1770–1772 (G.M.)	7272–7274 (T.M.); 7270–7272 (G.M.)	Grandson of Iyasu II.
313	Takla Giyorgis I	5 years	1774–1779 (T.M.); 1772–1777 (G.M.)	7274–7279 (T.M.); 7272–7277 (G.M.)	Son of Yohannes II.

==== Regency of the Warra Sehs in Gondar ====
Tafari's regnal list concludes with the end of the first reign of Tekle Giyorgis I, after which the Emperors of Ethiopia had significantly diminished power compared to before. By the time Tekle Giyorgis I began his reign, Ethiopia had already entered the "Zemene Mesafint" or Era of the Princes, during which the emperor was merely a figurehead. Tekle Giyorgis I himself received the nickname Fiṣame Mengist ("the end of the government"), reflecting his status as the last emperor to exercise authority on his own.

Taye Gabra Mariam's list, however, extends beyond the reign of Tekle Giyorgis to include influential Rases who held de facto power during the Zemene Mesafint. This section of Taye's list also includes three emperors who held de facto as well as de jure power beginning with Tewodros II, whose reign brought an end to the "Era of the Princes".

No.	Title	Name	Length of rule	Reign Dates	
No.	Title	Name	Length of rule	E.C.	A.M.
–	Ras	Ali the Greater	4 years	1777–1781	7277–7281
–	Ras	Aligaz	5 years	1781–1786	7281–7286
–	Ras	Asrat and Walda Gabriel	6 years	1786–1792	7286–7292
–	Ras	Gugsa	26 years	1792–1818	7292–7318
–	Ras	Yimam	2 years	1818–1820	7318–7320
–	Ras	Mariyya	3 years	1820–1823	7320–7323
–	Ras	Dori	3 months	1823	7323
–	Ras	Ali II	22 years	1823–1845	7323–7345
314	Emperor	Tewodros II	15 years	1845–1860	7345–7360
315	Emperor	Takla Giyorgis II	3 years	1860–1863	7360–7363
316	Emperor	Yohannes (Note: Third monarch named "Yohannes" on this list, but was fourth to reign under this name. Yohannes III was one of the emperors of the Zemene Mesafint who was omitted from this list.)	18 years	1863–1881	7363–7381

==== Descendants of Prince Yakob in Shewa ====
"Rule of the Descendants of the House of Ya'iqob in Shäwa".

Taye Gabra Mariam included a list of rulers of Shewa who were descended from Prince Yakob, fourth son of Lebna Dengel, and were the ancestors of Emperor Menelik II, who succeeded Yohannes IV in 1889 (G.C.). Each king is named as the son of the previous king. Taye's list ignores the rulers after Haile Melekot.

Name	Length of rule	Reign Dates	
Name	Length of rule	E.C.	A.M.
Nagasi	7 years	1687–1693	7187–7193
Sibistyanos	15 years	1693–1708	7193–7208
Abiyya	25 years	1708–1733	7208–7233
Amiha Iyasus	34 years	1733–1767	7233–7267
Asfaw Wasan	33 years	1767–1800	7267–7300
Wasan Sagad	4 years	1800–1804	7300–7304
Sahla Selassie	34 years	1804–1838	7304–7338
Hayla Malakot	8 years	1838–1846	7338–7346

==== House of Menelik II ====
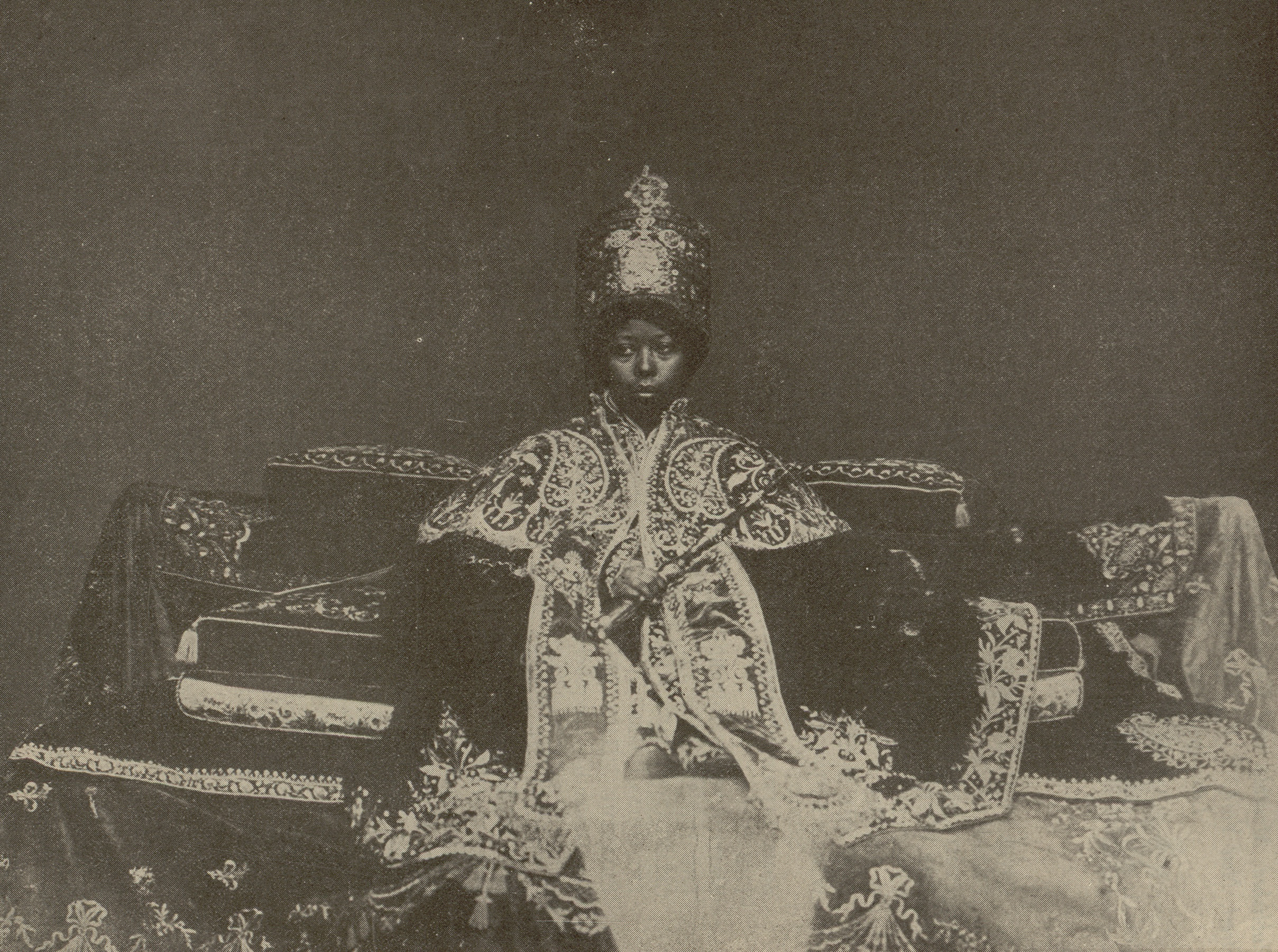
Empress Zauditu, the incumbent Ethiopian monarch at the time the regnal list was written, pictured in 1921.

Taye Gabra Mariam ended his regnal list with the then-current dynasty, consisting of Menelik II, his grandson Lij Iyasu, and Menelik's daughter, Empress Zewditu, who was in power at the time the regnal list was written.

No.	Name	Title	Length of rule	Reign Dates	
No.	Name	Title	Length of rule	E.C.	A.M.
–	Menelik II	King of Shewa	23 years	1857–1881	7357–7381
317	Menelik II	Emperor of Ethiopia	24 years	1882–1906	7382–7406
318	Lij Iyasu	Emperor of Ethiopia	3 years	1906–1909	7406–7409
319	Zauditu	Empress of Ethiopia	Ascended the throne in 1909 A.D./7409 A.M. on the 22nd day of Maskaram.		

== Sources of information from Louis J. Morié's Histoire de l'Éthiopie ==
The following collapsible tables compare the list of kings found in Louis J. Morié's Histoire de l'Éthiopie (Volumes 1 and 2) with the 1922 Ethiopian regnal list.

In the first volume, after the so-called "Blemmyes dynasty", Morié continued naming kings of Nubia, grouped as the "Nobate dynasty" (548–c 1145), the "kings of Dongola" (i.e., Makuria) (c. 1145–1820), and the "kings of Sennar" (i.e., Funj Sultanate). However, the 1922 Ethiopian regnal list ignores Nubian and Sudanese kings after the fall of the Kingdom of Kush.

=== Comparison between Louis J. Morié's Nubian regnal list and the 1922 Ethiopian regnal list ===
Louis J. Morié			1922 regnal list		
Name/dynasty	Reign dates and length	Ref.	Name	Reign length	Numbered position
Pre-Flood Kings of Africa — 8544–6282 BC			Tribe of Ori or Aram — 4530–3244 BC		
Aram	c. 8300–8200 BC (100 years)		Ori I or Aram I	60 years	1
Gariak I	c. 8200 BC		Gariak I	66 years	2
Gankam	–		Gannkam	83 years	3
Borsa (Queen)	–		Borsa	67 years	4
Gariak II	–		Gariak II	60 years	5
Djan I	–		Djan I	80 years	6
Djan II	–		Djan II	60 years	7
Zeyn al-Zaman	–		Zeenabzamin	58 years	9
Sehelan	–		Sahlan	60 years	10
El-Rian I	–		Elaryan	80 years	11
Nimroud	–		Nimroud	60 years	12
Daloukah (Queen)	–		Eylouka	45 years	13
Sahloug	c. 6700–6672 BC (28 years)		Saloug	30 years	14
Scharid I	c. 6672–6600 BC (72 years)		Kharid	72 years	15
Houjib	c. 6600–6500 BC (100 years)		Hogeb	100 years	16
Makaos	c. 6500–6400 BC (100 years)		Makaws	70 years	17
Aphar	c. 6400–6350 BC (50 years)		Affar	50 years	19
Malinos	c. 6350–6282 BC (68 years)		Milanos	62 years	20
Soleyman Tchaghi	c. 6282 BC		Soliman Tehagui	73 years	21
The God-Kings or Divine Dynasty — 5880–c. 5500 BC			Tribe of Kam — 2713–1985 BC		
Kham	5880–5802 BC (78 years)		Kam	78 years	22
Kousch	5802 BC to between 5750 and 5600 BC		Kout	50 years	23
Asoun (Kasiyope I) (Queen)	5802 BC to between 5750 and 5600 BC		Nehasset Nais (Note: Taye Gabra Mariam used the name "Kasiyoni" for this queen.)	30 years	29
Mazig	5802 BC to between 5750 and 5600 BC		–	–	–
Hathor (Queen)	5802 BC to between 5750 and 5600 BC		–	–	–
Habesch	c. 5600 BC		Habassi	40 years	24
Raema (Hor-ka-am)	c. 5600 BC		Horkam	29 years	30
Rehoum	c. 5600 BC		–	–	–
Naphtoukh	c. 5600 BC		–	–	–
Loud	c. 5600 BC		–	–	–
Tetoun	c. 5600 BC		–	–	–
Ankh (Queen)	c. 5600 BC		–	–	–
Selk (Queen)	c. 5600 BC		–	–	–
Scheba II	c. 5550 BC		Saba I	30 years	31
Iehouda	c. 5550 BC		–	–	–
Malouli	c. 5550 BC		Lakendun I (?) (Note: Heruy Wolde Selassie's list added "Malis" to this king's name.)	25 years	37
The Meroites — c. 5500–c. 1800 BC			–	–	–
Mentou-Rai	c. 5500–5450 BC (50 years)		Manturay	35 years	38
Ra-khou	c. 5450 BC		Rakhu	30 years	39
Sebi I (Képhée)	Between 4360 and 4100 BC		Sabe I	30 years	40
First conquest of Egypt during the Eighth dynasty — Between 3491 and 3358 BC			–	–	–
7 or 8 Aethiopian kings ruled Thebes during the time of the Eighth dynasty, but their names are not known.			–	–	–
Second conquest of Egypt during the Thirteenth dynasty — 2398 BC			–	–	–
Snouka I Menken (Attozanes)	2398–2385 BC (in Egypt) (13 years)		Sousel Atozanis	20 years	42
Her-Hathor I (Erythras)	c. 2150 BC		–	–	–
Ba-en-Khons (Kambysès)	2072–2059 BC (13 years)		–	–	–
Poeri I	Between 3817 and 1800 BC		Piori I	15 years	46
The Invasion of Rama — The Hyksos — c. 1914–c. 1700 BC			Ag'azyan Dynasty —1985–982 BC		
Ankhnas	c. 1914–1885 BC (29 years)		Akhunas Saba II	55 years	47
Nekhti I (Nyktée)	c. 1885–1830 BC (55 years)		Nekate I	40 years	48
Sebi II (Képhée)	c. 1830–1815 BC (15 years)		Sabe II	15 years	50
Nekhti II	c. 1815–1760 BC (55 years)		–	–	–
Atew I (Ethiops)	c. 1760–1700 BC (60 years)		Etiyopus I	56 years	51
The Meroites — c. 1700–c. 1650 BC			–	–	–
Nower-Ari	c. 1700–1670 BC (30 years)		Lakendun II Nowarari	30 years	52
Thout-em-heb	c. 1670–1650 BC (20 years)		Tutimheb	20 years	53
The Jethrides — c. 1650–c. 1515 BC			–	–	–
At-Hor	c. 1650–1625 BC (25 years)		Her Hator II	20 years	54
Kheb-ab	c. 1625–1572 BC (53 years)		–	–	–
Atew II (Ethiops)	c. 1572–1570 BC (2 years)		Etiyopus II	30 years	55
Nekhti III	c. 1570–1515 BC (55 years)		–	–	–
Third conquest of Egypt during the Eighteenth dynasty — 1512 BC and 1477 BC			–	–	–
The Meroites — c. 1515–c. 1365 BC			–	–	–
Snouka II Menken (Raskhoperen)	c. 1515–1499 BC (in Aethiopia) (16 years); 1512–1499 BC (in Egypt) (13 years)		Senuka I Menkon	17 years	56
Bennou I	1499–1491 BC (8 years)		Bonu I	8 years	57
Moumeses (Moso) (Queen)	1491–1487 BC (4 years)		Mumazes	4 years	58
Aruas	1487 BC (7 months)		Aruas	7 months	59
Amen-as-ro I	1487–c. 1470 BC (17 years)		Amen Asro I	30 years	60
Poeri II	Between 1460 and 1400 BC		Piori II	15 years	62
Amen-em-hat I	c. 1375–1370 BC (5 years)		Amen Emhat I	40 years	63
Khonsi (Ganges)	c. 1370–1365 BC (5 years)		Konsi Hendawi	5 years	69
The Bennides — 1365–1314 BC			–	–	–
Bennou II	c. 1365–1363 BC (2 years)		Bonu II	2 years	70
Sebi III	1363–1348 BC (15 years)		Sabe III	15 years	71
Se-Khons	1348–1327 BC (21 years)		Sekones	20 years	72
Fourth conquest of Egypt during the Nineteenth dynasty — 1327 BC			–	–	–
Snouka III Menkon (Raskhoperen)	1327–1314 BC (in Aethiopia) (13 years); 1327–1324 BC (in Egypt) (3 years)		Senuka II	10 years	73
The Perseides (Meroites) — 1314–1280 BC			–	–	–
Her Hathor II (Erythras)	1314–1285 BC (29 years)		Her Hator II	30 years	78
Her Hathor III	1285–1284 BC (1 year)		Her Hator III	1 year	79
Nekhti IV	1284–1280 BC (4 years)		Nekate II	20 years	80
The Tithonides (Meroites) — 1280–c. 1230 BC			–	–	–
Tetouni	1280–1270 BC (10 years)		Titon	10 years	81
Her-Mentou	1270 BC		Hermantu	5 months	82
Amenemhat II	1270–1265 BC (5 years)		Amen Emhat II	5 years	83
Khons-Ab I	1265–1260 BC (5 years)		Konsab I	5 years	84
Khons-Ab II	1260–c. 1255 BC (5 years)		Konsab II	5 years	85
Snouka IV Menkon	c. 1255–1240 BC (15 years)		Senuka III	5 years	86
Amen-As-Tat	c. 1240–1230 BC (10 years)		Amen Astate	30 years	88
Ammonian dynasty (Napatite Branch) — 1100–541 BC			–	–	–
Her-Hor	1110–1100 BC (In Egypt) (10 years); 1100–1094 BC (In Aethiopia) (16 years)		Herhor	16 years	89
Piankhi I	1094–1085 BC (9 years)		Piyankihi I	9 years	90
Pinotsem I	1085–1069 BC (16 years)		Pinotsem I	17 years	91
Pinotsem II	1069–1028 BC (41 years)		Pinotsem II	41 years	92
Masaherta	1028–1012 BC (16 years)		Massaherta	16 years	93
Ra-men-khoper	1012–998 BC (14 years)		Ramenkoperm	14 years	94
Pinotsem III	998–992 BC (6 years)		Pinotsem III	7 years	95
Sebi IV	992–983 BC (9 years)		Sabe IV	10 years	96
Ro-ke-Amen (Luqman / Menelik I)	983–958 BC (25 years)		Menelik I	25 years	99
Fifth conquest of Egypt during the Twenty-second dynasty — 994 BC			Dynasty of Menelik I — 982 BC–920 AD		
Atserk-Amen I (Zerakh I)	958–943 BC (15 years)		Sera I	26 years	101
Amenhotep	943–884 BC (59 years)		Amen Hotep	31 years	102
Ramessou (Ramses)	884–857 BC (27 years)		Ramissu	20 years	103
Atserk-Amen II (Zerakh II)	857–818 BC (39 years)		Sera II	38 years	104
Shabaka I	780–768 BC (12 years)		–	–	–
Sixth conquest of Egypt – 741 BC			–	–	–
Piankhi II	761–731 BC (in Aethiopia) (30 years); 741–731 BC (in Egypt) (10 years)		Piyankihi II	32 years	106
Kashta	731–725 BC (6 years)		Kashta I	13 years	108
Seventh and last conquest of Egypt – 725 BC			–	–	–
Shabaka II	725–715 BC (in Aethiopia) (10 years); 725–713 BC (in Egypt) (12 years)		Sabaka	12 years	109
Shabatoka	713–692 BC (in Egypt only) (21 years)		–	–	–
Tahraka	715–666 BC (in Aethiopia) (49 years); 692–666 BC (in Egypt) (26 years)		Terhak	49 years	111
Ourd-Amen I	666–660 BC (in Aethiopia) (6 years); 666–665 BC (in Egypt) (1 year)		Erda Amen	6 years	112
Nouat-Meiamoun	660–657 BC (in Aethiopia and Egypt) (3 years)		Nuatmeawn	4 years	114
Piankhi III	657–652 BC (in Aethiopia and Thebes) (5 years)		Piyankihi III	12 years	115
Amen-as-ro II	652–651 BC (in Egypt) (1 year); 652–650 BC (in Aethiopia) (2 years)		Amen Asro II	16 years	116
Piankhi IV	650–616 BC (34 years)		Piyankihi IV	34 years	117
Aspourta	616–575 BC (41 years)		Aspurta	41 years	118
Hor-se-atew I	575–541 BC (34 years)		Harsiatew	12 years	119
Ammonian dynasty (Meroite Branch) — 541 BC to Between 105 and 30 BC			–	–	–
Nastosenen	541–525 BC (16 years)		Nastossanan	14 years	120
Houd-as-ew	525–498 BC (27 years)		Handu	11 years	121
Beroua-em-heb (nephew of predecessor)	498 BC–?		–	–	–
Taaaken	c. 450 BC		Elalion Taake	10 years	129
Amenou-khroud	Between c. 450 BC and c. 340 BC		–	–	–
Kantakeh II (Queen)	c. 340–320 BC (20 years)		Nikawla Kandake II	10 years	135
Atserk-Amen III	c. 300–250 BC (50 years)		Atserk Amen III	10 years	130
Erk-Amen I	c. 250–230 BC (20 years)		Arkamen I	10 years	138
Atserk-Amen IV	c. 230–215 BC (15 years)		Atserk Amen IV	10 years	131
Arou-Amen	c. 215–204 BC (9 years)		Aruwara	10 years	139
Ankh-em-akhouti	c. 204–184 BC (20 years)		–	–	–
Hor-em-akhouti	c. 184 BC		–	–	–
Hor-se-atew II	Between 105 and 30 BC		–	–	–
The Blemmyes dynasty — From between 105 and 30 BC to 548 AD			–	–	–
Kantakeh III (Queen)	c. 30–20 BC (10 years)		Akawsis Kandake III	10 years	137
Kantakeh IV (Queen)	c. 10 BC		Nikosis Kandake IV	10 years	144
Erk-Amen II	c. 20–30 AD (10 years)		Arkamen II	10 years	145
Raoura (Queen)	c. 30–35 AD (5 years)		–	–	–
Cleopatra (Queen) (daughter of predecessor)	c. 35–40 AD (5 years)		–	–	–
Hakaptah	c. 40–50 AD (10 years)		Akaptah	8 years	167
Hor-em-tekhou	c. 50–60 AD (10 years)		Horemtaku	2 years	168
Kandake V (Queen)	c. 60–80 AD (20 years)		Garsemot Kandake VI	10 years	169
Erk-Amen III (son of predecessor)	c. 80 AD		–	–	–
Hor-nekht-atew	c. 192–229 AD (37 years)		Hernekhit	15 years	146
Ouikera	c. 229–250 AD (11 years)		Awkerara	20 years	147
Psheraan	c. 250–268 AD (18 years)		Baseheran	10 years	148
Khouwoumenou	c. 300 AD		Kawawmenun	20 years	149
Tereremen	c. 373–381 AD (8 years)		Kerarmer	8 years	150
Psentes	Between 450 and 530 AD		Bsente	10 years	151
Berou-Kanower	Between 450 and 530 AD		Etbenukawer	10 years	152
As-a-ran	After 530 AD		–	–	–
Ab-ra-amen	After 530 AD (at least 2 years)		Abramen	20 years	153

=== Comparison between Louis J. Morié's Abyssinian regnal list and the 1922 Ethiopian regnal list ===
In many cases, Morié follows the regnal order and reign lengths found on various Ethiopian regnal lists recorded before the 20th century. Morié's list can be compared with those included in the Wikipedia article for Regnal lists of Ethiopia.

Louis J. Morié			1922 regnal list			Information from Morié's narrative
Name/dynasty	Reign dates and length	Ref.	Name	Reign length	Numbered position	Information from Morié's narrative
The First Dynasties — 5802–1776 BC			Tribe of Kam — 2713–1985 BC			
Kush	c. 5802 BC–?		Kout	50 years	23	
Habesch I	–		Habassi	40 years	24	
Habesch II	–		Habassi	40 years	24	
The Arwe Dynasty — 1776–1376 BC			–	–	–	
Arwe I	1776 BC–?		–	–	–	
Arwe II	–		–	–	–	
Arwe III	c. 1400 BC		–	–	–	
The Angaban Dynasty — 1376–955 BC (421 years between Angabo I and Makeda)			Ag'azyan Dynasty — 1985–982 BC (426 years between Angabo I and Makeda)			
Za Baesi Angabo I	1376 BC–?		Angabo I	50 years	74	
Za Gedour I	1176 BC–?		Zagdur I	40 years	77	
Za Sebadho	1076–1026 BC (50 years)		Za Sagado	20 years	80	
Za Qaouasya	1026–1005 BC (21 years)		Tawasya I	13 years	97	
Za Makeda (Queen)	1005–955 BC (50 years)		Makeda	31 years	98	
The Solomonic dynasty			Dynasty of Menelik I (Before the birth of Christ) — 982 BC–9 AD			
The Za Kings – 955 BC–162 AD			Dynasty of Menelik I (Before the birth of Christ) — 982 BC–9 AD			
Menelik I	955–930 or 926 BC (25 or 29 years)		Menelik I	25 years	99	
Tomai or Za Handadyo	930–929 or 926–925 BC (1 year)		Handeyon I and Tomai	1 year / 26 years	100 and 101	
Za Gedur or Barakid	929–926 or 925–922 BC (3 years)		Zagdur II	31 years	102	
'Aouda-'Amat	926–915 or 922–911 BC (11 years)		Aksumay I	20 years	103	
Za-Aousanya I	915–912 or 911–908 BC (3 years)		Awseyo	38 years	104	
Za Tahaouasya	912–881 or 908–877 BC (31 years)		Tawasya II	21 years	105	
Abreham I	881 or 877–c. 850 BC (4 to 31 years)		Abralyus	32 years	106	
Tazena I	After c. 850 BC		–	–	–	
Tazena II or Bazen I	After c. 850 BC		–	–	–	
Qualiza	After c. 850 BC		–	–	–	
Ouarada-Tsahai	After c. 850 BC		Warada Tsahay	23 years	107	
Handadyo II	After c. 850 BC		Handeyon II	13 years	108	
Ouarada-Negouc	After c. 850 BC		Warada Nagash I	49 years	111	
Aousanya II or Tazena III	After c. 850 BC		Awseya II	6 years	112	
Ela-Syon or Tazena IV or Bazen II (Elalyon)	After c. 850 BC		Elalion	10 years	129	
Unknown information	c. 850–180 BC		–	–	–	
Toma-Seyon or Germa Asfar I	?–c. 172 BC		Toma Seyon and Germa Asfare I	12 years / 9 years	115 and 172	
Syon-Geza I or Fasil I	Reigned for one day or half a day		Gasyo	–	113	
Za Aoutet I or Leb-Dakhare (Za-Maoute)	171–162 BC (8 years and 4 months)		Nuatmeawn and Awtet I	4 years / 34 years	114 and 117	
Zarea-Nebrat or Za-Bahas or Enza-Yeqre	162–152 BC (9 years)		Zaware Nebrat I and Baseheran	41 years / 10 years	118 and 148	
Senfai or Qaouda	152–149 BC (3 years)		Safay I and Kawawmenun	12 years / 20 years	119 and 149	
Ramhai or Qanaz or Negouc-Area	149–138 BC (11 years)		Ramhay I and Kanaz	14 years / 13 years	120 and 126	
Handadyo III	138–128 BC (10 years)		Handu	11 years	121	
Za-Ouasan I or Hezba Arad	c. 128–126 BC (2 years)		–	–	–	
Za-Handadyo IV or Bahr-Ared	c. 126–123 BC (3 years)		–	–	–	
Maekala-Ouedem (Kalas)	c. 123–115 BC (8 years)		Kolas	10 years	140	
Za-Sendo I (Satyo)	c. 115–97 BC (18 years)		Satyo II	14 years	142	
Za Feleka	c. 97–70 BC (27 years)		Feliya II	15 years	146	
Agleboul	70–67 BC (3 years)		Aglbul	8 years	157	
Baouaoual or Za Aousanya III	67–66 BC (1 year)		Bawawl and Awsena	10 years	158 and 155	
Za Baoua-Area or Bahr-Ouedem	66–37 BC (29 years)		Barawas	10 years	159	
Za-Masih I	37–36 BC (1 year)		Mahasse	5 years	161	
Nalke	Between 36 and 8 BC		Nalke	5 years	163	
Za-Beesi-Bazen III	8 BC–9 AD (17 years)		Bazen	17 years	165	
–	–	–	Dynasty of Menelik I (After the birth of Christ) — 9–306			
Senfa-Ared I or Senfa-Asged or Za-Sendo II	9–35 (26 years)		Tsenfa Asagad	21 years	166	
Za-Laeka	35–45 (10 years)		–	–	–	
Za-Masih II	45–51 (6 years)		Mesenh	7 years	171	
Za-Sendo III (Za-Setoua)	51–60 (9 years)		Sutuwa	9 years	172	
Bahr-Asged I or Bahr-Sagad I or Za-Adgala or Adgaba	60–70 (10 years and 7 months or 10 years and 10 months)		Adgala II	10 years and 6 months	173	
Judith (Queen Regent)	c. 70		Garsemot Kandake VI	10 years	169	
Germa-Sor or Za-Agbea	70 (6 or 26 months)		Agba	6 months	174	
Germa-Asfare II or Bahr-Sor or Za-Masih III	70–74 (4, 6 or 7 years)		Germa Asfare I	9 years	172	
Za Hailou-Syon I or Serad (Hakli)	74–87 (13 years)		Nasohi Tseyon, Serada and Hakali	6 years / 16 years / 12 years	177, 175, and 178	
Za-Demabe	87–97 (10 years)		Demahe II	10 years	179	
Za-Aoutet II	97–99 (2 years)		Awtet III	2 years	180	
Za-Aouda I	99–129 (30 years)		Awadu	30 years	182	
Za-Zagen and Rema	129–133 (4 or 8 years)		Zagun and Rema	5 years / 3 years	183 and 184	
Za-Hafala	133–134 (1 year)		Gafale	1 year	186	
Za-Beesi-Saroue-Syon	(4 years) (Note: Louis J. Morié did not provide reign dates for this king for unclear reasons.)		Beze Wark	4 years	187	
Zareai or Zarea-Syon or Za-Ela-Asguagua I	134–141 (7 years)		Zaray and Asgwegwe	10 years / 8 years	179 and 189	
Bagam Jan or Ela-Arka	141–162 (21 years)		Alaly Bagamay	7 years	181	
Sabea Asged I or Jan Asged I or Za-Beesi Ouasan II	162 (6 months or 1 year)		Jan Asagad I	30 years	182	
Syon-Geza II or Za-Ouakana	162 (1, 2, or 20 days or 2 months)		Wakana	2 days	191	
Za-Maoual or Za-Hadaous	162 (1 or 4 months)		Hadawz	4 months	192	
Genha or Ela-Sagal (Same as Moal Genba)	— (3 years)		Sagal	3 years	193	
The El or Ela branch – 162–328		—	—	—	—	
Ela-Asfeha I or El-Asfeh	162–176 (14 years)		Asfeha I	14 years	194	
Za-Gedour III or Ela-Tzegab	176–199 (23 years)		Atsgaba Seifa Arad I	6 years	195	
Senfa Ared II or Ela-Samera	199–202 (3 years)		Atsgaba Seifa Arad I	6 years	195	
El Aiba or Ela Aiba	202–218 (16 years)		Ayba II	17 years	196	
Ela-Eskender I or Sara-Diu	218–254 (36 or 37 years)		–	–	–	
Ela-Sehma or Tesama I (Son of predecessor)	254–263 (9 years)		Tsaham I	9 years	197	
El Ouasan I or Ela-Ouasan I (Brother of predecessor)	263–276 (13 years)		–	–	–	
El Aiga or Ela-Aiga	276–294 (18 years)		–	–	–	
Ela-Ameda I or Tazena V (Grandfather or uncle of Abreha and Atsbeha)	294–325 (30 years and 8 months)		Tazer (Wozena)	10 years	199	
Ela-Ahiaoua, Bakhas, Bakhasa or Ela-Asguagua II	325–328 (3 years)		Ahywa Sofya	7 years	200	
From the Christianisation of Ethiopia until the usurpation of the Falashas – 328–937			Dynasty of Menelik I (Christian Sovereigns) — 306–493			
El-Abreha I (Sole rule)	328–343 (15 years)		Abreha and Atsbeha	38 years	201 and 202	
El-Abreha I and Ela-Asbeha I (Joint rule) (Ezana and Saizana)	343–356 (13 years)		Abreha and Atsbeha	38 years	201 and 202	
El-Abreha II, Ela-Asfeha-Masqal and Ela-Shahl I (Asael I) (Joint rule) (Sons of Abreha I)	356–370 (14 years)		–	–	–	
El-Abreha II, Ela-Asfeha-Masqal and Ela-Shahl I (Asael I) (Joint rule) (Sons of Abreha I)	356–370 (14 years)		–	–	–	
El-Abreha II, Ela-Asfeha-Masqal and Ela-Shahl I (Asael I) (Joint rule) (Sons of Abreha I)	356–370 (14 years)		–	–	–	
El-Abreha II	356–359 or 363 (3 or 7 years)		–	–	–	
Ela-Asfeha-Masqal	356–368 (12 years)		AsfehII and Arfed Gabra Maskal I	7 years / 4 years	203 / 205	
Ela-Shahl (Asael I)	356–370 (14 years)		Sahle II	14 years	204	
Ela-Addana I (Identical to one of the preceding three kings)	– (14 years)		Adhana I	5 years	206	
Ela-Retana	370–371 (1 year)		Riti	1 year	207	
Ela-Asfeha II or Asged I (Same as Ela-Retana)	– (1 year)		Asfeh III	1 year	208	
Ela-Asbeha II	371—376 (5 years)		Atsbeha II	5 years	209	
Ela-Ameda II	376—392 (16 years)		Ameda II	15 years	210	
Ela-Abreha III	392 (2 or 6 months)		Abreha II	7 months	211	
Ela-Shahl II (Same as Ela-Abreha III)	392 (2 or 6 months)		Sahle III	2 months	212	
Ela-Gobaz I	392–394 (2 years)		(Ela) Gabaz I	2 years	213	
Ela-Shahl III	394–395 (1 year)		Sahle IV	4 years	214	
Ela-Asbeha III	395–398 (3 years)		–	–	–	
Ela-Abreha IV and Ela-Addana II (Joint rule)	398–414 (16 years)		Abreha III and Adhana II	10 years / 6 years	215 and 216	
Ela-Sehma or Tesama II	414–442 (28 years)		Tsaham II	2 years	218	
Ela-Ameda III	442–454 (12 years)		Ameda III	1 year	219	
Ela-Shahl IV (Asael IV) or Lalibala I	454–456 (2 years)		Sahle V	2 years	220	
Ela-Sabea (Same as Ela-Shahl IV)	– (2 years)		Tsebah	3 years	221	
Ela-Shema or Tesama III	456–471 (15 years)		Tsaham III	2 years	222	
Ela-Gobaz II (Same as Angabo II)	– (21 years)		(Ela) Gabaz II	6 years	223	
Angabo II and Leui (Levi) (Joint rule)	471–475 (4 years)		Agabo and Lewi	1 year / 2 years	224 and 225	
Ela-Ameda IV	475–486 (9 years)		(Al) Ameda V	8 years	230	
Yaqob I (Jacob I) and Daouit II (David II) (Joint rule)	486–489 (3 years)		Yaqob I and Dawit II	3 years / 14 years	226 and 227	
Armakh I	489–503 (14 years)		Armah I	14 years	227	
Tazena VII	503–505 (2 years)		Ezana (sic)	7 years	231	
Aroue V, Yaqob II or Za-Sendo IV (Usurper)	505–514 (9 years)		–	–	–	
—	—	—	Dynasty of Atse (Emperor) Kaleb until Gedajan — 493—920			
Ela-Asbeha IV (Saint Elesbaan) (First Emperor)	514–542 (28 years)		Kaleb	30 years	232	
Beta-Israel	542–c. 545 (3 years)		Za Israel	1 month	233	
Gabra-Masqal I or Ela-Asbeha V	c. 545–c. 580 (35 years)		Gabra Maskal II	14 years	234	
Quastantinos II	c. 580–c. 615 (c. 35 years in total)		Kostantinos	28 years	235	
Ouasan-Sagad I, Asged II or Bazagar	c. 580–c. 615 (c. 35 years in total)		Wasan Sagad	15 years	236	
Ela-Asfeha III (Eldest son of predecessor)	c. 580–c. 615 (c. 35 years in total)		—	—	—	
Armakh II or Armah (Second son of Ouasan-Sagad I) (Najashi)	c. 615–c. 645 (30 years)		—	—	—	
Jan-Asfeha (Son of predecessor)	7th century		—	—	—	
Jan-Asged II	7th century		—	—	—	
Fekra-Sena (Fre-Sennai)	7th century		Fere Sanay	23 years	237	
Andryas I or Andre I (Aderaz)	7th century		Advenz (Aderaz)	20 years	238	
Aizour I	7th century		—	—	—	This king was deceived by a woman named Sebat, who overthrew him and became queen. However, she only ruled for a short time and was driven out by Hailou-Ouedem. An invasion of locusts took place during Aizour's reign. Aizour's son suffered from an eye disease and feared blindness, and Aizour claimed he would share the throne and his wealth with whoever could cure his son. A man named Desta succeeded in curing the king's son, married the eldest daughter of the king, and was appointed co-regent with the king. The king's son's illness, however, relapsed after his father and Desta were both dead.
Hailou-Ouedem or Maedai (Akala-Ouedem)	7th century		Akala Wedem	8 years	239	
Galaoudeouos I or Germa-Asfare III	8th century		Germa Asfare II	15 years	240	
Zergaz I	8th century		Zergaz	10 years	241	
Degna-Mikael I, Bahr-Hailou or Dalez	8th century		Dagena Mikael	26 years	242	
Goum	8th century		Gum	24 years	244	
Asguamgoum	8th century		Asguagum	5 years	245	
Ela-Ouedem (Letem)	8th century		Latem	16 years	246	
Del-Ouedem (Talatem)	8th century		Talatam	21 years	247	
'Oda-Sasa, 'Oda-Guch or El-Abreha VI	8th century		Gadagosh	13 years	248	
Aizour II or Gefa	8th century		Ayzur	Half a day	249	
Addi-Ouedem or Badgeza (Dedem)	8th century		Dedem	5 years	250	
Zergaz II	8th century		—	—	—	
Oualda-Ouedem or Madmen (Ouededem)	8th century		Wededem	10 years	251	
Ouedem-Asfare I	?–c. 805		Wudme Asfare	30 years	252	
Armakh III	c. 830		Armah II	5 years	253	
Yohannes I (Prester John)	c. 770		—	—	—	
Hazba	After 830		—	—	—	
Arni	After 830		—	—	—	
Degna-Jan	After 830		Degennajan	19 years	254	
Geda-Jan	c. 923		Gedajan	1 year	255	
Anbasa-Ouedem (Usurper)	924–925 (1 year)		Anbase Wedem	20 years	257	
Del-Naad	925–937 (12 years)		Del Naad	10 years	258	
The Jewish Falasha dynasty (937–977)			—	—	—	
Yodit I	937–977 (40 years)		Gudit	40 years	256	
Yodit II (Terda-Gabez) (Daughter of predecessor)	977 (a few months)		—	—	—	
The Christian Dynasty of the Zagwe (977–1331)			Sovereigns issued from Zagwe (920—1253)			
Mara Takla Haimanot	977–992 (15 years)		Mara Takla Haymanot	13 years	259	
Taitou-Ouedem	992–1030 (38 years)		Tatawdem	40 years	260	
Germa Chioum	1030–1070 (40 years)		Germa Seyum	40 years	262	
Yemrehana Krestos	1070–1110 (40 years)		Yemrhana Kristos	40 years	263	
Jan Chioum	1110–1150 (40 years)		Jan Seyum	40 years	261	
Qedous Harbe Chioum I	1150–1182 (32 years)		Kedus Arbe	40 years	264	
Lalibala II	1182–1220 (38 years)		Lalibala	40 years	265	
Naakueto Laab	1220–1268 (48 years)		Nacuto Laab	40 years	266	
The Zagwe dynasty only ruled at Lasta after 1268.			—	—	—	
Yetbarak	1268–1290 (22 years)		Yatbarak	17 years	267	
Marari	1290–1308 (18 years)		Mayrari	15 years	268	
Harbe Chioum II	1308–1331 (23 years)		Harbay	8 years	269	

== See also ==
- Regnal lists of Ethiopia
- Ethiopian historiography
- List of kings of Axum
- List of emperors of Ethiopia
- List of royal consorts of Ethiopia

== Sources ==
=== Bibliography ===
- Anderson, Knud Tage (2000). "The Queen of the Habasha in Ethiopian History, Tradition and Chronology". Bulletin of the School of Oriental and African Studies, University of London. 63 (1): 31–63. doi:10.1017/S0041977X00006443. JSTOR 1559587.
- Basset, René (1882). Études sur l'histoire d'Éthiopie. Paris.
- Bruce, James (1790). Travels to discover the source of the Nile, in the years 1768, 1769, 1770, 1771, 1772, and 1773: Volume II. Edinburgh.
- Budge, E. A. (1922). Kebra Nagast: The Queen of Sheba and Her Only Son Menyelek.
- Budge, E. A. (1928a). A History of Ethiopia: Nubia and Abyssinia (Volume I). London: Methuen & Co.
- Budge, E. A. (1928b). A History of Ethiopia: Nubia and Abyssinia (Volume II). London: Methuen & Co.
- Dillmann, August (1853). "Zur Geschichte des abyssinischen Reichs". Zeitschrift der Deutschen Morgenländischen Gesellschaft (in German). 7: 338–364.
- Edwards, Frederick A. (1918). "The Early Kings of Axum". The Asiatic Review. 14: 438–503.
- Fattovich, Rodolfo (1990). "Remarks on the Pre-Axumite Period in Northern Ethiopia". Journal of Ethiopian Studies. 23: 1–33. JSTOR 44324719.
- Kropp, Manfred (2005). "Die traditionellen äthiopischen Königslisten und ihre Quellen" (PDF). IBAES (in German). 5.
- Kropp, Manfred (2006). "Ein später Schüler des Julius Africanus zu Beginn des 20. Jahrhunderts in Äthiopien". In Wallraf, Martin (ed.). Julius Africanus und die christliche Weltchronistik (in German). Berlin: Walter de Gruyter. ISBN 978-3-11-019105-9.
- Gabra Maryam, Alaqa Tayya (1987). History of the People of Ethiopia (in Amharic and English). Translated by Grover Hudson; Tekeste Negash. Uppsala: Centre for Multiethnic Research (Uppsala University – Faculty of Arts). ISBN 91-86624-12-1. ISSN 0281-448X.
- Ludolf, Hiob (1684). A New History of Ethiopia. London.
- Mekuria, Tekle Tsadik (1959). History of Nubia.
- Morié, Louis J. (1904a). Histoire de L'Éthiopie (Nubie et Abyssinie): Tome Ier - La Nubie (in French). Paris.
- Morié, Louis J. (1904b). Histoire de L'Éthiopie (Nubie et Abyssinie): Histoire de L'Abyssinie (in French). Paris.
- Morkot, Robert G. (2003). "On the priestly origin of the Napatan kings: The adaptation, demise and resurrection of ideas in writing Nubian history". In O'Conner, David; Andrew, Reid (eds.). Ancient Egypt in Africa. London: UCL Press. pp. 154–156. ISBN 1-84472-000-4.
- Munro-Hay, Stuart (1991). Aksum: An African Civilisation of Late Antiquity. United Kingdom: Edinburgh University Press. ISBN 0-7486-0106-6.
- Munro-Hay, Stuart (2006). The Quest for the Ark of the Covenant: The True History of the Tablets of Moses. London: I.B. Tauris & Co Ltd.
- Páez, Pedro (2008). Isabel Boavida; Hervé Pennec; Manuel João Ramos (eds.). História da Etiópia (in Portuguese). Assirio & Alvim.
- Phillips, Jacke (1997). "Punt and Aksum: Egypt and the Horn of Africa". The Journal of African History. 38 (3). Cambridge University Press: 442. doi:10.1017/S0021853797007068. JSTOR 182543. S2CID 161631072.
- Rey, Charles F. (1924). Unconquered Abyssinia as it is to-day. Philadelphia: J. B. Lippincott Company.
- Rey, C. F. (1927). In the Country of the Blue Nile. London: Camelot Press.
- Salt, Henry (1814). A Voyage to Abyssinia. London: W. Bulmer and Co.
- Selassie, Sergew Hable (1972a). Ancient and Medieval Ethiopian History to 1270. Addis Ababa.
- Selassie, Sergew Hable (1972b). "The Problem of Gudit". Journal of Ethiopian Studies. 10 (1): 113–124. ISSN 0304-2243. JSTOR 41965849.
- Tamrat, Taddesse (1972). Church and State in Ethiopia. Oxford: Clarendon Press.
- Truhart, Peter (1984). Regents of Nations (Part 1). Munich: K. G. Saur. ISBN 3-598-10492-8.
- Tubiana, Joseph (1962). "Quatre généalogies royales éthiopiennes". Cahiers d'Études Africaines (in French). 2 (7): 491–508. JSTOR 4390812.

== External linkls ==
- Media related to 1922 regnal list of Ethiopia at Wikimedia Commons
