= Ahmed Kamal =

Ahmed Kamal may refer to:

- Ahmed Kamal (cricketer) (born 1977), former Bangladeshi cricket
- Ahmed Kamal (footballer) (born 1981), Egyptian football defender
- Ahmed Kamal (Egyptologist) (1851–1923), Egypt's first Egyptologist
- Ahmed Kamal (scientist) (born 1956) Indian scientist
- Ahmad Kamal, Pakistani diplomat
