= 2014–15 Egypt Cup =

2015 Egypt Cup
Tournament details
- Country: Egypt
- Teams: 32

Final positions
- Champions: Zamalek
- Runners-up: Al Ahly

Tournament statistics
- Matches played: 31
- Goals scored: 93 (3 per match)
- Top goal scorer(s): (Ghana) John Antwi (5 goals)

The 2015 Egypt Cup (also known as Pepsi Egypt Cup for sponsorship reasons) was the 83rd season of the Egypt Cup since its establishment in 1921. The winners assures a place in the 2016 CAF Confederation Cup; however as the two finalist qualified to the Champions League the berth was given to the fourth placed team in 2014–15 Egyptian Premier League.

Zamalek, the defending champions, successfully defended the title after defeating their rivals Al Ahly 2–0 in the Final to win their third consecutive title.

== Schedule and format ==
Round	Draw date	Date	Fixtures	Clubs	Format details
Preliminary round	1 January 2015	4–6 January 2015	12	56 → 32	Local team seeding: Draw of lots. Knock-out tournament type: Single match.
Round of 32	6 January 2015	11–18 January 2015	16	32 → 16	New entries: Clubs participating in Egyptian Premier League will gain entry. Local team seeding: Draw of lots. Knock-out tournament type: Single match.
Round of 16	4 July 2015	19 July–15 August 2015	8	16 → 8	Local team seeding: Draw of lots. Knock-out tournament type: Single match.
Quarterfinals	4 July 2015	4–18 August 2015	4	8 → 4	Local team seeding: Draw of lots. Knock-out tournament type: Single match.
Semifinals	4 July 2015	16–17 September 2015	2	4 → 2	Local team seeding: Draw of lots. Knock-out tournament type: Single match.
Final	4 July 2015	21 September 2015	1	2 → 1	Single match, stadium TBD by EFA. CAF Confederation Cup qualification: winner will qualify for 2016 CAF Confederation Cup.

== Bracket ==
Numbers in parentheses represent the results of a penalty shoot-out. Teams that are bolded advanced on. If "(p)" is next to a team name, it means that they advanced on penalties.

**Round of 32**; 11–18 January 2015
**Al Ahly**	6
Tahta	1
**El Gouna**	2
Al Nasr Lel Taa'den	0
**Al Mokawloon**	2
Al Merreikh	1
ENPPI	1
**Ittihad El Shorta**	2
**Petrojet**	2
Baladeyet El Mahalla	0
**Ala'ab Damanhour**	2
Al Wasty	0
Al Assiouty Sport	2
**Misr El Makasa**	3
**El Dakhleya**	2
El Mansoura	1
**Ismaily**	1
Tala'ea El Gaish	0
**El Raja**	1
Ghazl Kafr El Douar	0
**Smouha**	4
Al Said Bel Mahalla	0
**Al Nasr**	6
Al Maaday & Al Yacht	1
Al Masry	0 (4)
**Al Ittihad** (p)	0 (5)
**Wadi Degla** (p)	2 (8)
Ghazl Damietta	2 (7)
**Zamalek**	2
Nogoom El Mostakbal	1
**Haras El Hodoud**	3
Kafr El Zayat	0

**Round of 16**; 19–23 July 2015; 13–15 August 2015
**Al Ahly**	13
El Gouna	0
Al Mokawloon	0 (3)
**Ittihad El Shorta** (p)	0 (5)
**Petrojet**	2
Ala'ab Damanhour	0
**Misr El Makasa** (p)	1 (2)
El Dakhleya	1 (0)
**Ismaily**	2
El Raja	0
**Smouha**	4
Al Nasr	1
**Al Ittihad**	1
Wadi Degla	0
**Zamalek**	3
Haras El Hodoud	1

**Quarterfinals**; 4–18 August 2015
**Al Ahly**	5
Ittihad El Shorta	0
**Petorjet**	1
Misr El Makasa	0
Ismaily	1 (3)
**Smouha** (p)	1 (5)
Al Ittihad	0 (2)
**Zamalek** (p)	0 (4)

**Semifinals**; 16–17 September 2015
**Al Ahly**	3
Petrojet	1
Smouha	0 (3)
**Zamalek** (p)	0 (4)

**Final**; 21 September 2015
Al Ahly	0
**Zamalek**	2

== Round of 32 ==
11 January	Zamalek	2–1	Nogoom El Mostakbal	Cairo
17:30	Ali 59', 87'	Report	Hamam 52'	Stadium: 30 June Stadium

13 January	Al Assiouty Sport	2–3	Misr El Makasa	Assiut
14:00	Mansh 51'; Teddy 86'	Report	Ragab 20'; Farag 55'; Kaboria 81'	Stadium: Al Assiouty Sport Stadium

14 January	Haras El Hodoud	3–0	Kafr El Zayat	Alexandria
14:30	Mekky 39', 75'; Gamal 74'	Report		Stadium: Alexandria Stadium

14 January	El Dakhleya	2–1	El Mansoura	Cairo
14:30	Rabie 16'; Salama 50'	Report	El Said 87'	Stadium: 30 June Stadium

14 January	Wadi Degla	2–2 (8–7 p)	Ghazl Damietta	Cairo
17:30	Ohawuchi 51'; Al Agha 67'	Report	Rizk 33' (pen.); El Hagrasy 69'	Stadium: 30 June Stadium
	Penalties
	Moheb (penalty missed); Salem (penalty missed); Homos (penalty scored); T. Adel (penalty scored); Abdel Fattah (penalty scored); El Merghani (penalty scored); Said (penalty scored); Ohawuchi (penalty scored); Arafat (penalty scored); Mohamed (penalty scored)		(penalty scored) El Said; (penalty scored) Habata; (penalty scored) Nasef; (penalty missed) El Sheikh; (penalty missed) Roshdy; (penalty scored) Hashem; (penalty scored) El Hagrasy; (penalty scored) Awad; (penalty scored) Saiko; (penalty missed) Abdel Wahab

15 January	Ala'ab Damanhour	2–0	Al Wasty	Damanhour
14:00	Koné 49'; El Ghannam 78'	Report		Stadium: Ala'ab Damanhour Stadium

15 January	Al Masry	0–0 (4–5 p)	Al Ittihad	Ismaïlia
14:30		Report		Stadium: Ismailia Stadium
	Penalties
	Abdel Hakim (penalty scored); Raouf (penalty scored); El Shahat (penalty scored); Abdel Aal (penalty missed); Samir (penalty scored); Mousa (penalty missed)		(penalty missed) Samir; (penalty scored) R. Adel; (penalty scored) Mabrouk; (penalty scored) Farouk; (penalty scored) Eid; (penalty scored) Boughanmi

15 January	Al Nasr	6–1	Al Maady & Al Yacht	Cairo
14:30	El Saidy 6', 37', 75'; Manté 58'; Essam 60'; Waya 62'	Report	Kaaboucha 34'	Stadium: Petro Sport Stadium

15 January	Al Ahly	6–1	Tahta	Cairo
17:30	Soliman 23'; El Saïd 25'; Nagieb 37'; Rizk 39'; Moteab 66' (pen.), 68'	Report	Raafat 45+3'	Stadium: Cairo International Stadium

16 January	Petrojet	2–0	Baladeyet El Mahalla	Suez
14:30	Emam 38'; Shebeita 72'	Report		Stadium: Suez Stadium

16 January	Ismaily	1–0	Tala'ea El Gaish	Ismaïlia
17:30	Antwi 4' (pen.)	Report		Stadium: Ismailia Stadium

17 January	El Gouna	2–0	Al Nasr Lel Taa'den	El Gouna
14:00	El Said 17'; Hosney 69'	Report		Stadium: El Gouna Stadium

17 January	El Raja	1–0	Ghazl Kafr El Douar	Alexandria
14:30	Sokrat 84'	Report		Stadium: Alexandria Stadium

18 January	Al Mokawloon	2–1	Al Merreikh	Cairo
14:30	Abdel Wahed 39'; Shaesha 43'	Report	Gaafar 74'	Stadium: Arab Contractors Stadium

18 January	Smouha	4–0	Al Said Bel Mahalla	Alexandria
14:30	Taalat 65'; El Egazy 67'; Samy 88' (o.g.); Kwaku 90'	Report		Stadium: Alexandria Stadium

18 January	ENPPI	1–2	Ittihad El Shorta	Cairo
17:30	Kahraba 49'	Report	Poku 55'; Bassiony 70'	Stadium: Petro Sport Stadium

== Round of 16 ==
19 July	Smouha	4–1	Al Nasr	Alexandria
19:00	El Egazy 18' (pen.), 74'; Abdel Khaleq 27'; Farid 32' (pen.)	Report	El Saidy 65'	Stadium: Alexandria Stadium

20 July	Petrojet	2–0	Ala'ab Damanhour	Suez
19:00	Salem 35' (o.g.); Gamal 50'	Report		Stadium: Suez Stadium

22 July	Misr El Makasa	1–1 (2–0 p)	El Dakhleya	Fayoum
17:30	Fathi 31'	Report	Salama 11'	Stadium: Fayoum Stadium
	Penalties
	Said (penalty missed); Mourad (penalty scored); Bekri (penalty scored); Hamdy (penalty missed)		(penalty missed) Salama; (penalty missed) Abdel Gouad; (penalty missed) Fekri; (penalty missed) Seddik

22 July	Ismaily	2–0	El Raja	Ismailia
20:00	El Solia 22', 90+1' (pen.)	Report		Stadium: Ismailia Stadium

23 July	Al Ittihad	1–0	Wadi Degla	Alexandria
17:30	Kamal 62'	Report		Stadium: Alexandria Stadium

23 July	Al Mokawloon	0–0 (3–5 p)	Ittihad El Shorta	Cairo
20:00		Report		Stadium: Arab Contractors Stadium
	Penalties
	Abou Sha'esha (penalty scored); Gamal (penalty missed); Abdel Wahed (penalty scored); Abdel Aal (penalty scored)		(penalty scored) Rico; (penalty scored) Rabo; (penalty scored) Sotohi; (penalty scored) Adel; (penalty scored) Kamal

13 August	Al Ahly	13–0	El Gouna	Cairo
20:00	Saïd 3' (o.g.); El Saïd 9', 10'; Antwi 18', 27', 79', 81'; Sobhy 49'; Fathy 51'; Evouna 55'; Gedo 60'; El Sayed 66'; Ghaly 86'	Report		Stadium: Petro Sport Stadium

15 August	Zamalek	3–1	Haras El Hodoud	Cairo
20:00	Fathy 71', 72'; Abdel Khaleq 87'	Report	Ramadan 79' (pen.)	Stadium: Petro Sport Stadium; Referee: Gehad Grisha

== Quarterfinals ==
4 August	Petrojet	1–0	Misr El Makasa	Suez
16:45	Ragab 43'	Report		Stadium: Suez Stadium

12 August	Ismaily	1–1 (3–5 p)	Smouha	Ismaïlia
19:30	El Said 36'	Report	Ezzat 73'	Stadium: Ismailia Stadium
	Penalties
	Abd Rabo (penalty missed); Nagieb (penalty scored); Adel (penalty scored); Ikechukwu (penalty scored)		(penalty scored) Salama; (penalty scored) Mohareb; (penalty scored) Ashraf; (penalty scored) Manga; (penalty scored) Said

16 August	Al Ahly	5–0	Ittihad El Shorta	Cairo
19:30	El Saïd 30'; Sobhy 35'; Zakaria 58'; Moteab 71', 88'	Report		Stadium: Petro Sport Stadium

18 August	Al Ittihad	0–0 (2–4 p)	Zamalek	Alexandria
19:30		Report		Stadium: Alexandria Stadium; Referee: Samir Osman
	Penalties
	Farouk (penalty missed); Khaled (penalty missed); Adel (penalty scored); Shehata (penalty scored)		(penalty scored) M. Ibrahim; (penalty scored) Kahraba; (penalty missed) Salah; (penalty scored) Hamed; (penalty scored) Mekky

== Semifinals ==
16 September	Al Ahly	3–1	Petrojet	Cairo
19:00	Sobhy 42'; El Sayed 70'; Fathy 88'	Report	Ragab 23'	Stadium: Petro Sport Stadium; Referee: Mahmoud Al Banna

17 September	Smouha	0–0 (3–4 p)	Zamalek	Alexandria
19:00		Report		Stadium: Alexandria Stadium; Referee: Mohamed El Hanafy
	Penalties
	Salama (penalty scored); Mohareb (penalty scored); Manga (penalty missed); Ashraf (penalty missed); Sayed (penalty scored); Ezzat (penalty missed)		(penalty missed) M. Ibrahim; (penalty scored) Kahraba; (penalty scored) Hamed; (penalty scored) Fathy; (penalty missed) Mekky; (penalty scored) Tawfik

== Final ==
21 September 2015
19:00 UTC+2

Al Ahly	0–2	Zamalek
	Report	Morsy 11', 34'

Petro Sport Stadium, Cairo
Referee: Jonas Eriksson (Sweden)

== Top goalscorers ==
As of 21 September 2015.

Rank	Player	Club	Goals
1	(Ghana) John Antwi	Ismaily (1); Al Ahly (4)	5
2	(Egypt) Ahmed El Saidy	Al Nasr	4
2	(Egypt) Abdallah El Saïd	Al Ahly	4
2	(Egypt) Emad Moteab	Al Ahly	4
5	(Egypt) Hany El Agazy	Smouha	3
5	(Egypt) Ramadan Sobhy	Al Ahly	3
7	11 players		2
