= Pharaohs in the Bible =

Pharaohs mentioned in the Bible

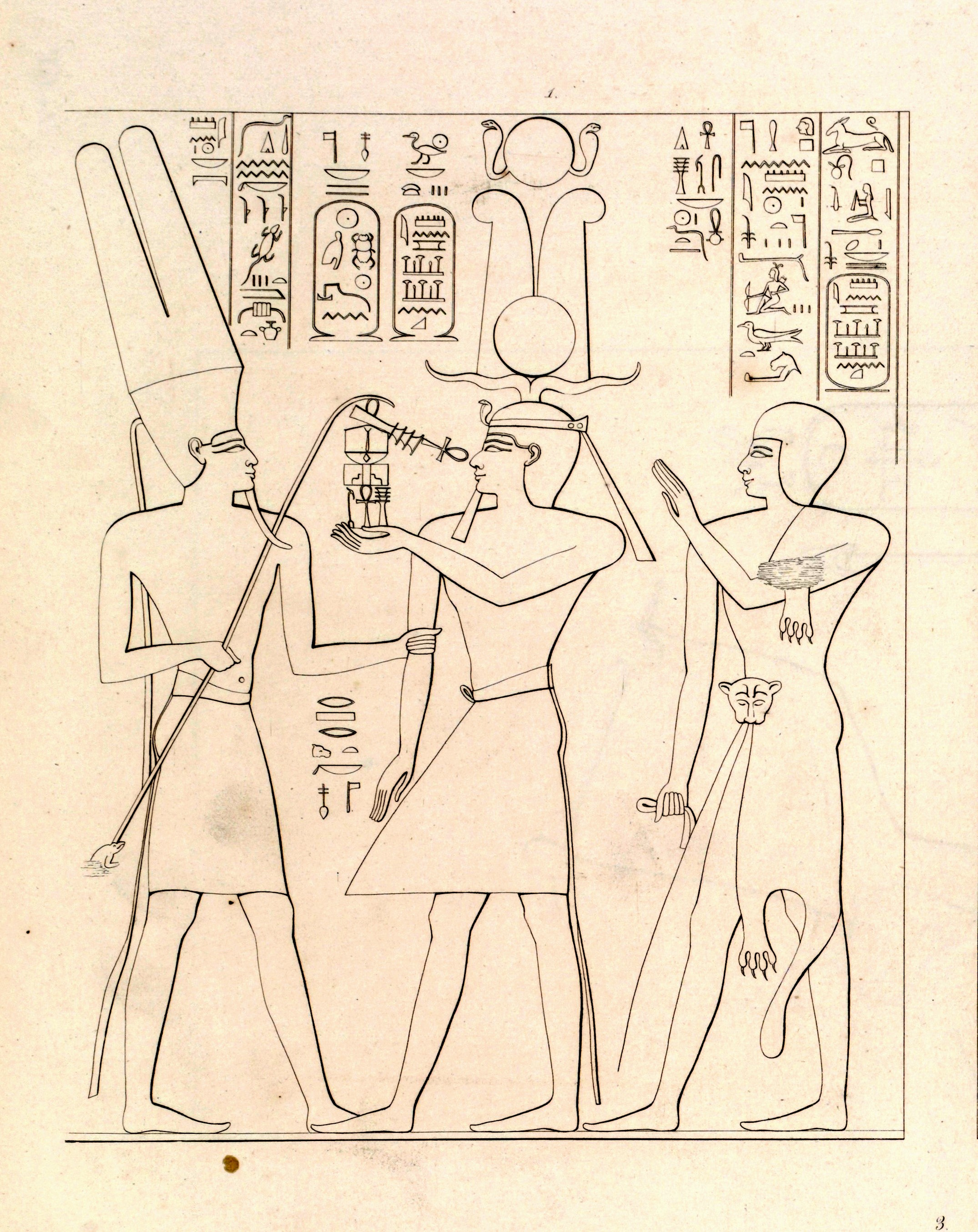
Shoshenq I (centre), founder of the Twenty-second Dynasty of Egypt and the earliest Biblical figure to be attested in the archaeological record

The Bible makes reference to various pharaohs (Hebrew: פַּרְעֹה, Parʿō) of Egypt. These include unnamed pharaohs in events described in the Torah, as well as several later named pharaohs, some of whom were historical or can be identified with historical pharaohs.

== Unnamed pharaohs in the Book of Genesis ==
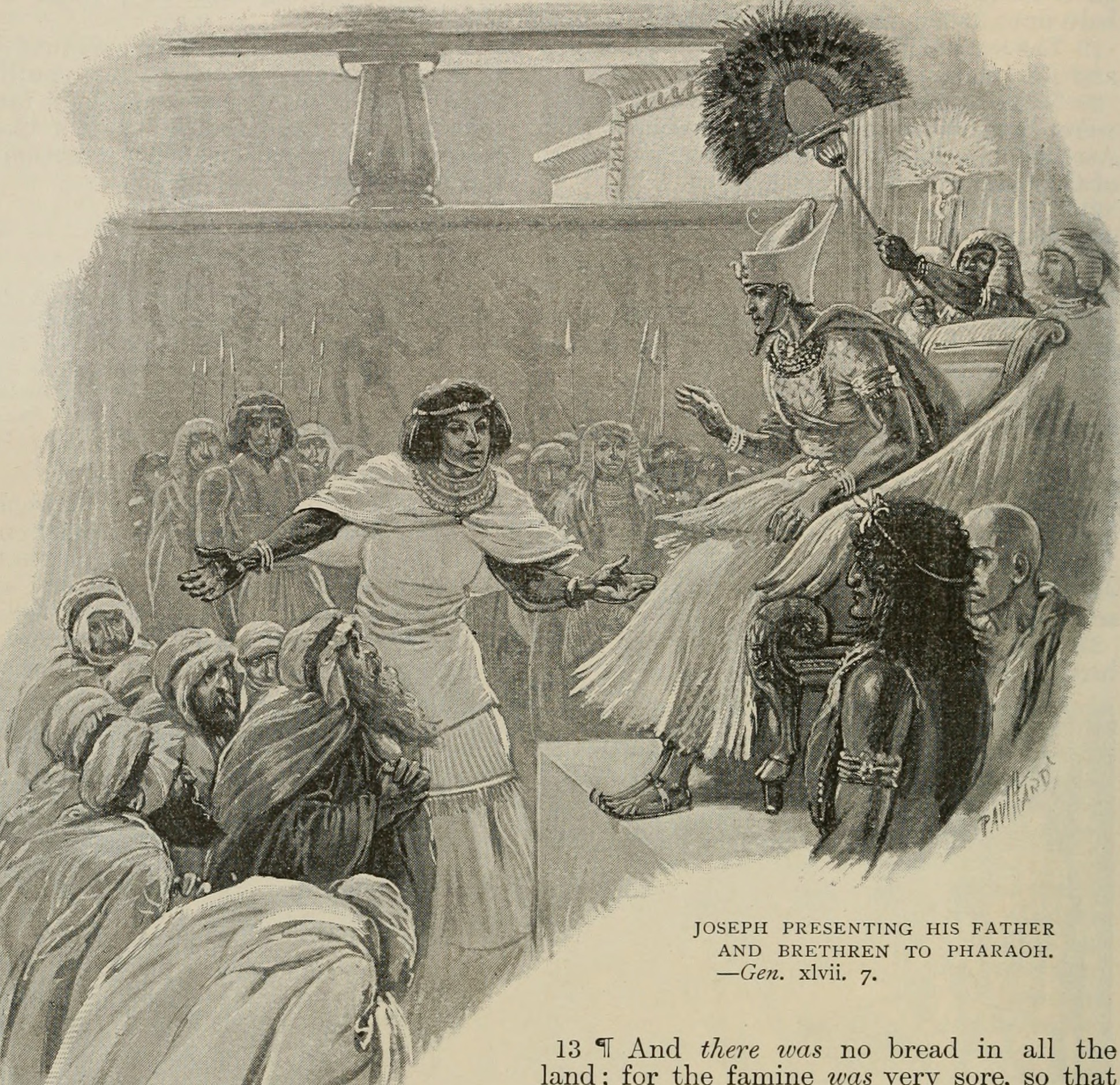
Joseph presenting his father and brethren to the Pharaoh (1896)

Genesis 12:10–20 states that Abram moved to Egypt to escape a period of famine in Canaan. Abram worries that the unnamed Pharaoh will kill him and take away his wife and half-sister Sarai, so Abram tells her to say only that she is his sister. They are eventually summoned to meet Pharaoh, but God sends plagues because he wishes to marry her and she is already married. Discovering that Sarai is also Abram's wife, he releases her and orders Abram to take his belongings and return to Canaan.

- David Rohl's New Chronology states this pharaoh would have been Nebkaure Khety. This claim has been rejected by the vast majority of Egyptologists.

=== Pharaoh of Joseph's era ===
Genesis 37–50 narrates that Joseph, son of Jacob, was sold by his brothers into slavery in Egypt, appointed by another, unnamed Pharaoh as vizier of Egypt, and later permitted to bring his father, his brothers, and their families from Canaan to live in the Land of Goshen in the eastern Nile Delta around what is now Faqous.

- The time of Joseph's arrival in Egypt has been associated with the migrations of people from Canaan into the northeastern regions of Egypt from the early second millennium BC and the rise of the Hyksos during the Second Intermediate Period (c. 1750–1550 BC).
- Author Ahmed Osman proposed that this pharaoh was Thutmose IV and identified Joseph with Yuya. Other scholars generally reject Osman's claims.
- David Rohl argued that this pharaoh was Amenemhat III and identified Joseph as the Egyptian vizier Ankhu. Rohl's claim has been rejected.
- Egyptologist and museum curator, Ahmad Kamal identified this Pharaoh as the Hyksos ruler Khyan, based on the similarity of the Pharaoh's Arabic name Nahraus to Khyan's cartouche; which Kamal interpreted as reading "Ne Re Ous."

== Unnamed pharaohs in the Book of Exodus ==
In the Book of Exodus, the Israelites, who are the descendants of Jacob's sons, are living in Goshen under a new Pharaoh, who oppresses them. He forces them to work long hours to build Pithom and Pi-Ramesses, making mortar and baking bricks. The king of Egypt tells the Hebrew midwives to kill the newborn Hebrew boys to reduce their numbers due to concerns about their growing population. Shiphrah and Puah try to prevent this, to no avail.

Moses, a Levite, is saved from this decree by his mother, who instructs his sister Miriam to watch over him after he is placed in a reed basket in the Nile. He is discovered and adopted by Pharaoh's daughter. Miriam asks the princess if she would like an Israelite woman to help nurse the child, and returns with Moses' mother, who is then able to raise her child under royal protection. Later, Moses is returned to Pharaoh's daughter and raised as part of the royal household. Rabbinic literature identifies the Pharaoh of the Exodus as one of the four men who pretended to be gods.

It is not merely one pharaoh whose identity or historical role in the Book of Exodus needs to be discovered. Various theories posit several Pharaohs in the narrative as follows:

- Pharaoh who "did not know Joseph," and therefore began the enslavement. Some researchers connect this with the expulsion of the Hyksos.
- Pharaoh who reigned when Moses was a young child, and who therefore was the royal household into which Moses was adopted.
- Pharaoh who reigned when Moses fled to Midian.
- Pharaoh who reigned during the Exodus itself.
- Pharaoh during the invasion and conquest of Canaan, based on contemporary letters from local rulers.

=== Hypotheses through past centuries ===
Numerous Pharaohs have been proposed as contemporary with the Exodus. The following list is comprehensive and ordered chronologically by when the pharaoh ruled rather than on the plausibility of the identification itself:

This list includes theories and claims offered from various sources throughout all past eras, including during the time periods of ancient history, medieval history, the Renaissance and post-Renaissance, and modern times.

==== Earlier pharaohs ====
- Pepi I (24th–23rd century BC): Emmanuel Anati has argued that the Exodus should be placed between the 24th and the 21st century BC and that Pepi I should be identified as the pharaoh of the Exodus. This theory has not gained acceptance and has received strong criticism from Israeli archaeologist Israel Finkelstein and American Egyptologist James K. Hoffmeier.
- Dedumose II (died c. 1690 BC): David Rohl's 1995 A Test of Time revised Egyptian history by shortening the Third Intermediate Period of Egypt by almost 300 years. As a result, the synchronisms with the biblical narrative results in the Second Intermediate Period King Dedumose II the pharaoh of the Exodus. Rohl's chronological revisions have been rejected by the vast majority of Egyptologists.

==== Eighteenth Dynasty 1550 to 1292 BC ====
- Ahmose I (1550–1525 BC): Several Church Fathers identified Ahmose I, who reconquered lower Egypt from the Hyksos, rulers of Canaanite origin, as the pharaoh of the Exodus, based on Herodotus, Manetho, Josephus and other classical authors' identification of the Hyksos with the Hebrews.
- Hatshepsut (1507–1458 BC): Diodorus Siculus identified the Jews with the Hyksos and identified the pharaoh of the Exodus with Queen Hatshepsut. However, the biblical story of the Exodus repeatedly refers to pharaoh as a man.
- Thutmose II (1493–1479 BC): Alfred Edersheim proposes in Old Testament Bible History that Thutmose II is best qualified to be the pharaoh of Exodus because he had a brief, prosperous reign that suddenly collapsed without a legitimate heir. His widow Hatshepsut then became first regent (for Thutmose III, his son by his concubine Iset), before becoming Pharaoh herself. Edersheim states that Thutmose II is the only pharaoh's mummy to display cysts, which he suggests as possible evidence of plagues that spread through the Egyptian and Hittite Empires at that time.
- Thutmose III (1479–1427 BC): His reign corresponds with the time when the Masoretic Text of 1 Kings claims the Exodus occurred. His oldest son, and presumptive heir, also died as a child for unknown reasons, in keeping with the Exodus account of the final plague.
- Amenhotep II (1427–1401 BC): Amenhotep II claimed to have brought tens of thousands of slaves from the Levant to Egypt. Associates for Biblical Research asserts that these slaves were taken to compensate for the loss of Jewish slaves as a result of the Exodus. Amenhotep II was not the firstborn son of his father, Thutmose III, consistent with the Exodus pharaoh surviving the death of the firstborn.
- Thutmose IV (1401–1391 BC): Wayne A. Mitchell and David F. Lappin argued in the book "Thutmose IV as the Exodus Pharaoh: Chronological and Astronomical Considerations" that Thutmose IV is the most likely candidate.
- Amenhotep III. (1391–1353 BC): Ira Friedman made a claim in Jewish Bible Quarterly, for Amenhotep III as the Pharaoh of the Exodus. He cites several features of the pharaoh's reign, including the large number of statues dedicated to Sekhmet, a goddess associated with disease and healing. He also cites a gap in the records for this reign, and clear evidence of Canaanite rulers requesting help, due to tribes invading their region.
- Akhenaten (1353–1349 BC): In his book Moses and Monotheism, Sigmund Freud argued that Moses had been an Atenist priest of Akhenaten who was forced to leave Egypt, along with his followers, following the pharaoh's death. Eusebius identified the pharaoh of the Exodus with a king called "Acencheres", who may be identified with Akhenaten.

==== Nineteenth Dynasty 1292 to 1189 BC ====
- Ramesses I (1292–1290 BC): Ahmed Osman identified Ramesses I as the pharaoh of the Exodus in his controversial argument about the identity of the Egyptian official Yuya.
- Ramesses II (c. 1279–1213 BC): Ramesses II, or Ramesses the Great, is the most common figure for the Exodus pharaoh as Rameses is mentioned in the Bible as a place name (see Genesis 47:11, Exodus 1:11, Numbers 33:3, etc). Although the Beisan steles of Ramesses II mentions two conquered peoples who came to "make obeisance to him" in his city of Pi-Ramesses, the text mentions neither the building of the city nor, as some have written, the Israelites or Hapiru. However, many confessional scholars today do not subscribe to a late date for the Exodus and therefore hold that he lived far too late to be the Exodus pharaoh. Despite this, most scholars consider that the story of the Exodus is set in the 13th century BCE, and that the pharaoh referred to in the narrative is Ramesses II. This is mainly because there is a significant lack of evidence for an Israelite presence in Canaan before that century, because several place names in the Torah correspond to that period, and because the mention of certain materials, such as iron—though not in the Exodus narrative itself but elsewhere in the Torah and in the Judges Period—align more accurately with that historical context.
- Merneptah (c. 1213–1203 BC): Isaac Asimov in Guide to the Bible makes a case for Merneptah to be the pharaoh of the Exodus. Recently, Semiticist Richard C. Steiner defended Merneptah as the Exodus pharaoh, positing that the events of Numbers 14:44–45 coincide with the reference to Israel being "laid waste" in the Merneptah Stele. Also, Manetho and Chaeremon of Alexandria, both quoted by Josephus in Against Apion, state that the Jews were expelled from Egypt by a pharaoh named "Amenophis", son of another pharaoh named "Ramses". Thomas Schneider argues that "Amenophis" in these accounts refers to Merenptah, as elsewhere Manetho calls Ramesses II's successor (Merenptah) once as "Amenophis" and another time as "Ammenephthis".

==== Later pharaohs ====
- Setnakhte (c. 1189–1186 BC): Igor P. Lipovsky, Israel Knohl and Manfred Bietak make a case for Setnakhte to be the pharaoh of the Exodus.
- Ramesses III (c. 1186–1155 BC): Baruch Halpern and Gary A. Rendsburg make a case for Ramesses III as the pharaoh of the Exodus.
- Bakenranef (c. 725–720 BC): Tacitus writes in his Histories that Bakenranef (whom he refers to as "Bocchoris") had expelled the Jews from Egypt because they suffered from a horrible disease and because he was instructed to do so by an oracle of the god Amun. Lysimachus of Alexandria, quoted by Josephus in Against Apion, also identifies the pharaoh of the Exodus with Bakenranef.
- Some Arabian historians such as Tabari have cited the legendary Al-Walid ibn Mus'ab as being the pharaoh during Moses' adulthood.

=== Modern research ===
Numerous theories have been examined by modern publications and researchers, adding to the ongoing debate on this. This also includes research on other pharaohs during nearby time periods, whose reigns might be highly relevant to research on this topic.

==== Ahmose I ====
Ahmose I is claimed by some some sources to be the Pharaoh of the Exodus. One major part of the evidence cited for this claim is Ahmose's role in expelling the Hyksos. Dr. Joseph Weinstein wrote: "one can easily identify an event that contains many overlaps with the exodus story: The expulsion of the foreign Hyksos 15th dynasty rulers of the Delta by the native Egyptian 17th dynasty rulers of Thebes at the end of the Second Intermediate Period, (ca. 1535 B.C.E.). The “Pharaohs” of the biblical enslavement and exodus were, I would submit, the 15th Dynasty Hyksos rulers of the Delta, and the Hebrew slaves of the biblical account were their lower-class West Semitic subjects.".

Various sources have noted similarities between the text of the Tempest Stele and the Biblical account of the Exodus. One article notes that on this stela, "the text speaks of a tremendous storm that involved both upper and lower Egypt. It states that this storm displayed the “wrath” of a “great God”. Notice it speaks of “God” in the singular. It also states that this God was “greater” than the “gods” of Egypt. According to the Storm Stela, the tempest plunged Egypt into total “darkness” for a period of several days."

==== Amenhotep II ====
Amenhotep II is claimed by various sources to be the Pharaoh of the Exodus. One major basis for this is that by counting backwards from the date of Solomon's Temple, using the time period stated in the Book of Kings, the date of the Exodus would appear to be during Amenhotep II's reign. This is based upon the "High Chronology" used by Egyptologists.

Another proof cited for this claim is the fact that there is an apparent gap in the historical record for Amnenhotep II's reign, following his third campaign of conquest, which some claim indicates that some disaster had impeded record-keeping. Also the city of Avaris is widely known to have been occupied by Semitic groups, and archeology indicates that it was abandoned during Amenhotep II's reign.

Douglas Petrovich notes that Amenhotep II claimed to have brought tens of thousands of slaves from the Levant to Egypt., and claims these slaves were taken to compensate for the loss of Jewish slaves as a result of the Exodus. Amenhotep II was not the firstborn son of his father, Thutmose III, consistent with the Exodus pharaoh surviving the death of the firstborn. Petrovich uses the Jubilees cycles as an additional basis for dating the Exodus. .

== Unnamed pharaohs In the Books of Kings ==
In 1 Kings 3:1, it is narrated that to seal an alliance, the pharaoh of Egypt gave a daughter in marriage to Solomon. The same ruler later captured the city of Gezer and gave it to Solomon as well (1 Kings 9:16). No name is given for the pharaoh, and some hypotheses have been proposed:

- Horemheb (c. 1319–1292 BC): David Rohl's 1995 A Test of Time, using an alternative chronology of the Near East, identified Horemheb as this pharaoh. Rohl's alternative chronology theory has been rejected by the vast majority of Egyptologists.
- Siamun (c. 986–967 BC): is the most commonly proposed candidate for this role.
- Psusennes II (c. 967–943 BC): the Catholic Encyclopedia sees him as the best candidate.
- Shoshenq I (c. 943–922 BC): Edward Lipiński dated the destruction of Gezer to the late 10th century rather than earlier, and suggested that its conqueror was Shoshenq I of the 22nd Dynasty.

== Named pharaohs ==
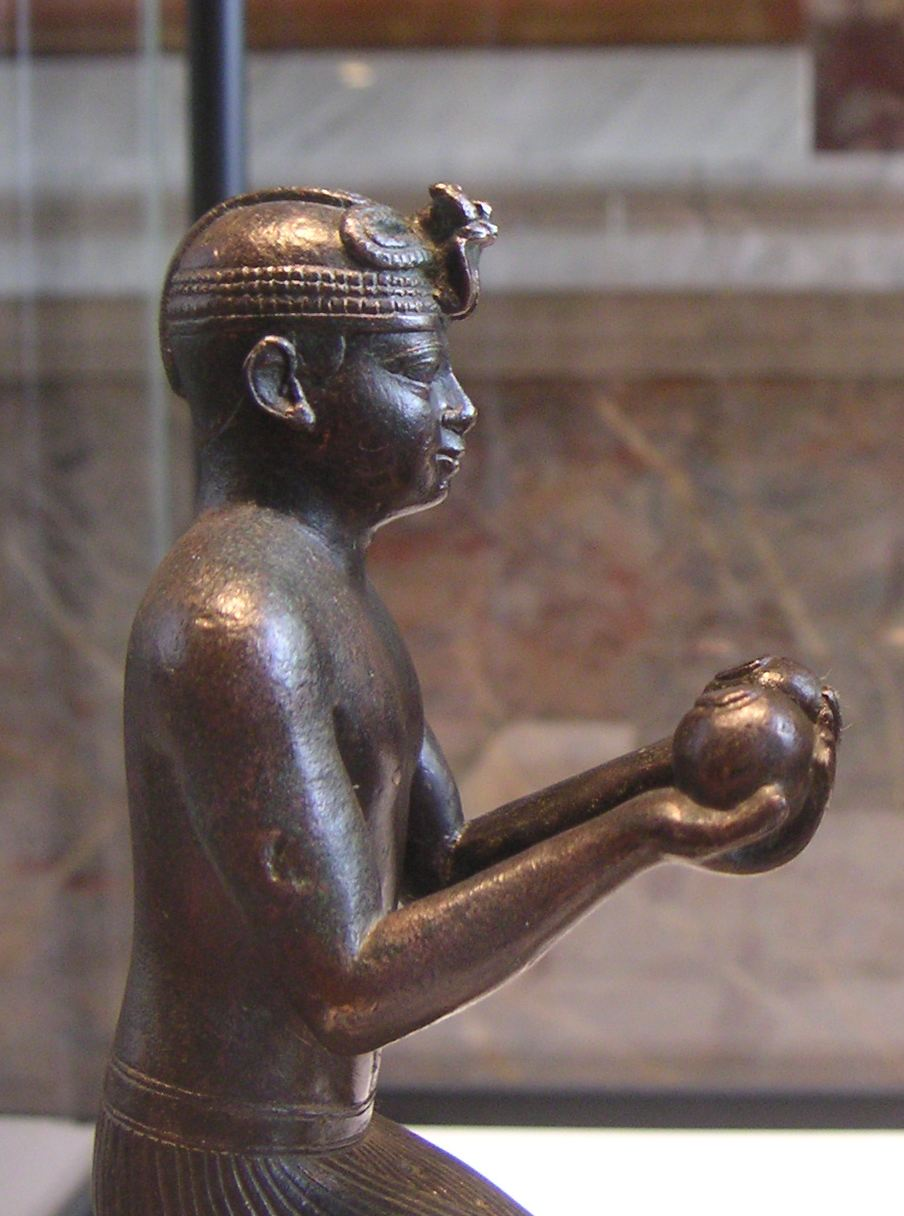
Taharqa offering to Falcon-god Hemen (close-up)

The transition in the biblical text from referring to pharaohs by the title "Pharaoh" (Hebrew: פַּרְעֹה) without their individual names, may follow the Egyptian convention of referring to pharaohs only by their titles. This was only broken by the middle of the 21st Dynasty by Pharaoh Siamun, becoming standard at the time of Shoshenq I, who is incidentally the first pharaoh to be mentioned by name in the biblical text. See the main page for Pharaoh.

An invasion of Israel by the Egyptian King Shishak (Hebrew שִׁישַׁק מֶלֶךְ־מִצְרַיִם), and a subsequent raid of Jerusalem and the Temple of Solomon is recorded in 1 Kings 11:40 and 2 Chronicles 12:2 sqq..

- Shishak is generally identified with Shoshenq I (943–922 BC), whose military campaign in the Levant is attested in his inscriptions.

King Hoshea sent a letter to an Egyptian King So (Hebrew סוֹא מֶלֶךְ־מִצְרַיִם), mentioned in 2 Kings 17:4. At this time (about 730 BC), Egypt had three dynasties ruling contemporaneously: 22nd at Tanis, 23rd at Leontopolis, and 24th at Sais.

- So is commonly identified with Osorkon IV (730–715 BC), who ruled from Tanis.
- Goedicke and Albright argued that "So" refers not to the name of a pharaoh but to the city of Sais, at this time ruled by Tefnakht. Kitchen definitively rejected this view.

A military commander named Tirhaqa is described in 2 Kings 19:9 and in Isaiah 37:9 as a king of Kush, who waged war against Sennacherib during the reign of King Hezekiah of Judah.

- This figure is universally identified as Taharqa (690–664 BC). The events in the biblical account are believed to have taken place in 701 BC, whereas Taharqa came to the throne some ten years later. The title of king in the Biblical text refers to his future royal title, while at the time of this account he was likely only a military commander serving under Shabaka.

A Pharaoh Necho (Hebrew: פַּרְעֹה נְכֹה) is mentioned in several books of the Bible (2 Kings, 2 Chronicles, and Jeremiah).

- Necho is universally identified as Necho II (610–595 BC).

The last pharaoh recorded in the Bible is called Hophra (Hebrew: חׇפְרַע), mentioned in Jeremiah 44:30.

- Hophra is universally identified as Apries (589–570 BC).

=== Deuterocanonical named pharaohs ===
1 Maccabees mentions Pharaoh Ptolemy (Hebrew: תלמי) as one of the kings that Antiochus IV Epiphanes engages in battle.

- Ptolemy is universally identified as Ptolemy VI Philometor (180–145 BC).

In addition, Alexander the Great (Hebrew: אַלֶכְּסַנְדֶּר), who ruled Egypt from 332 BC to 323 BC is also mentioned in 1 Maccabees. However, his title is only referred to as King of Greece, and so he doesn't count.

== See also ==
- List of biblical figures identified in extra-biblical sources
- Moses in Islam
- Thrasyllus of Mendes
- Biblical Egypt

== Bibliography ==
- Geraty, Lawrence T. (2015). "Exodus Dates and Theories". In Levy, Thomas E.; Schneider, Thomas; Propp, William H. C. (eds.). Israel's Exodus in Transdisciplinary Perspective: Text, Archaeology, Culture, and Geoscience. Springer. pp. 55–64. ISBN 978-3-319-04768-3.
- Patterson, Richard D. (2003). "The Divided Monarchy: Sources, Approaches, and Historicity". In Grisanti, Michael A.; Howard, David M. (eds.). Giving the sense: understanding and using Old Testament historical texts. Kregel. ISBN 978-0-8254-2892-0.
- Redmount, Carol A. (2001) [1998]. "Bitter Lives: Israel In And Out of Egypt". In Coogan, Michael D. (ed.). The Oxford History of the Biblical World. Oxford University Press. pp. 58–89. ISBN 978-0-19-988148-2.
