= 2015 Egypt Cup final =

- Event: 2015 Egypt Cup
Al Ahly	Zamalek
0	2
- Date: 21 September 2015
- Venue: Petro Sport Stadium, Cairo
- Referee: Jonas Eriksson (Sweden)
- Weather: Clear; 32 °C (90 °F); 30% humidity

The 2015 Egypt Cup final decided the winner of the 2015 Egypt Cup, the 83rd season of Egypt's premier football cup. It has played on 21 September 2015.

Zamalek, the winners of the previous final, faced Al Ahly; both of the clubs share rivalry in Cairo; Zamalek won the match 2–0 to win their third consecutive title and thereby claiming their 24th title.

The winner was going to play against the 2014–15 Egyptian Premier League winner in the 2015 Egyptian Super Cup; however as Zamalek won both the league and the cup they played against Al Ahly, the runner-up in both the league and the cup, in the Super Cup. The winner was also going to qualify for the 2016 CAF Confederation Cup but as both of the teams qualified for the 2016 CAF Champions League the berth was given to the 4th placed team in the league, Misr El Makasa.

== Background ==
It was the 47th time that Al Ahly reach the final (most recently in 2010 against Haras El Hodoud) winning a record of 35 title (two shared with Zamalek). Zamalek has reached the final 37 times; winning the Cup 23 times (two shared with Al Ahly).

== Route to the final ==
Al Ahly		Round	Zamalek
Opponent	Result	2015 Egypt Cup	Opponent	Result
Tahta	6–1	Round of 32	Nogoom El Mostakbal	2–1
El Gouna	13–0	Round of 16	Haras El Hodoud	3–1
Ittihad El Shorta	5–0	Quarterfinals	Al Ittihad	0–0 (4–2 pen.)
Petrojet	3–1	Semifinals	Smouha	0–0 (4–3 pen.)

=== Al Ahly ===
Al Ahly, of the Premier League, started the tournament on the first round on 15 January 2015, playing home to Second Division team Tahta, winning 6–1 with goals by Walid Soliman, Abdallah El Said, Mohamed Nagieb, Mohamed Rizk and Emad Moteab (2). On 13 August 2015 they played their second match at home to El Gouna, most of El Gouna players was from the youth academy; in result Al Ahly won 13–0, the game started with an early own goal from Shams El Dien Said then El Said scored two goals in two minutes, other goals scored by John Antwi (4), Ramadan Sobhy, Ahmed Fathy, Malick Evouna, Gedo, Hussein Sayed and Hossam Ghaly. The quarterfinal match played on 16 August 2015 at home against Ittihad El Shorta, the math ended 5–0 with goals from El Said, Sobhy, Moamen Zakaria and Moteab (2). On 16 September 2015 their semifinal match was also at home against Petrojet, Mohamed Ragab gave Petrojet the lead by a quick counter-attack in the middle of the first half, but Sobhy scored the equalizer on the 42nd minute; in the second half Sayed scored on the 70th minute and Fathy ended the match with a beautiful solo-goal on the 89th minute.

=== Zamalek ===
Zamalek, also of Premier League, started the tournament on the first round on 11 January 2015 at home against Second Division team Nogoom El Mostakbal, Zamalek has played the match with the reserve team, resulting Mohamed Hamam scoring the opener for Nogoom Al Mostakbal early in the second half; giving them the lead for only 7 minutes as Ahmed Ali Kamel scored the equalizer on the 59th minute and the winning goal on the 87th minute. The second match was on 15 August 2015 at home against Haras El Hodoud, the match ended 3–1, Mostafa Fathi scored two goal in two minutes and Ibrahim Abdel-Khaleq scored a goal in the 87th minute, Mohamed Ramadan scored the only goal for Haras El Hodoud from the spot. The third match was on 18 August 2015, they traveled to Alexandria to play against Al Ittihad, the match ended goalless but they won on penalties. The semifinal played away on 17 September 2015 against previous runner-up Smouha, Smouha played the game focusing on the attack but Genesh saved all of the attempts on goal, resulting the match to end goalless, Zamalek won the match 4–3 by penalties.

== Match ==
21 September 2015
19:15 (UTC+2)

Al Ahly	0–2	Zamalek
	Report	Morsy 11', 34'

Petro Sport Stadium, Cairo
Referee: Jonas Eriksson (Sweden)

Al-Ahly	Zamalek

GK	1	(Egypt) Sherif Ekramy
LB	7	(Egypt) Hussein El Sayed
CB	20	(Egypt) Saad Samir
CB	23	(Egypt) Mohamed Nagieb
RB	24	(Egypt) Basem Ali	(substituted off) 40'
CM	25	(Egypt) Hossam Ashour (c)
CM	12	(Egypt) Ahmed Fathy
AM	19	(Egypt) Abdallah Said
RW	32	(Egypt) Ramadan Sobhy
LW	3	(Egypt) Moamen Zakaria	(substituted off) 61'
ST	9	(Egypt) Amr Gamal	(substituted off) 78'
Substitutions:
GK	13	(Egypt) Ahmed Adel Abd El-Moneam
DF	2	(Egypt) Sherif Hazem
DF	6	(Egypt) Sabry Raheel
MF	22	(Egypt) Saleh Gomaa
MF	18	(Egypt) Mohamed Hamdy	(substituted on) 40'
FW	10	(Egypt) Emad Moteab	(substituted on) 78'
FW	5	(Ghana) John Antwi	(substituted on) 61'
Manager:
(Egypt) Fathi Mabrouk

GK	16	(Egypt) Genesh
RB	12	(Egypt) Ahmed Tawfik	(yellow card) 43'
CB	25	(Egypt) Ali Gabr
CB	8	(Burkina Faso) Mohamed Koffi
LB	22	(Egypt) Hamada Tolba
DM	3	(Egypt) Tarek Hamed
RM	4	(Egypt) Omar Gaber (c)		(substituted off) 64'
LM	15	(Nigeria) Maarouf Youssef
RW	14	(Egypt) Ayman Hefny		(substituted off) 56'
LW	11	(Egypt) Kahraba
ST	17	(Egypt) Basem Morsy	(yellow card) 64'	(substituted off) 80'
Substitutions:
GK	21	(Egypt) Mohamed Abou Gabal
DF	19	(Egypt) Ahmed Duiedar
MF	7	(Egypt) Hazem Emam
MF	6	(Egypt) Ibrahim Abdel-Khaleq		(substituted on) 64'
MF	30	(Egypt) Mostafa Fathi		(substituted on) 56'
FW	23	(Egypt) Mohamed Salem
FW	9	(Egypt) Ahmed Hassan Mekky		(substituted on) 80'
Manager:
(Portugal) Jesualdo Ferreira

- Assistant referees:
- Mathias Klasenius (Sweden)
- Daniel Wärnmark (Sweden)

Match rules

- 90 minutes of regular time.
- Penalty shoot-out if scores still level.
- Seven named substitutes.
- Maximum of three substitutions.
