= Al-Walid ibn Mus'ab =

Legendary king mentioned in medieval Arabic histories

Al-Walīd ibn Muṣʿab (Arabic: الوليد بن مصعب) is a legendary king who appears in medieval Arabic histories regarding Ancient Egypt. According to the Arab historians whom had transmitted the stories and traditions of him, he was the Pharaoh of the Exodus and essentially also the Pharaoh that is mentioned in the Qur'an. His real name has alternatively been given as Ṭalmā ibn Qūmis in some manuscripts.

His origins are heavily disputed as to whether he was a native Egyptian king, a foreign Amalekite king (from the dynasty of Ar-Rayyan), or an Arab from the Banu Lakhm tribe. According to the Akhbār al-zamān, Al-Walid, whose real name was Talma ibn Qumis, was a governor of Egypt and a native who assassinated the Hyksos ruler he was serving under and took the throne for himself afterwards. Arab writer Murtada ibn al-Afif agrees with this narrative, even providing the real name of the king as "Talma the Coptite." Al-Maqrizi further states that Al-Walid ibn Mus'ab was the last of the Pharaohs before Daluka and her son took over rulership of the kingdom. The historian Ibn Jarir al-Tabari provides an entirely different narrative, stating that Al-Walid ibn Mus'ab succeeded his brother Qabus ibn Mus'ab, who was the Pharaoh who had reportedly started the oppression of the Israelites, with Al-Walid merely continuing what his brother had left. Like the traditional Qur'anic narrative, the oppressive king and his army give chase to the Israelites but are drowned in the Red Sea, where in his final moments, the king tries to proclaim his faith in God, but his last minute repentance is not accepted. Humorous stories about the king have also been narrated, such as a story where the king suffered from continuous diarrhea for more than a week after witnessing the staff of Moses transform into a large snake.

Although Al-Walid is a purely legendary figure, attempts to link him with historical figures have been made. Egyptian archeologist Hossam Abdolfotouh identified Al-Walid with Ramesses V, the fourth ruler of the Twentieth Dynasty of Egypt. Egyptologist and museum curator Ahmad Kamal identified Al-Walid with Amenhotep III of the Eighteenth Dynasty, based on Kamal's reading of an accessible manuscript that was written by Ptolemaic historian Artapanus of Alexandria.

In modern times, the story of Al-Walid ibn Mus'ab is used by Egyptian nationalists to erase the popular narrative that the oppressive Pharaoh of Moses was an Egyptian.

== Cause of appearance ==
It is worth noting that the reason some people believe that the Pharaoh of Moses had an Arabic name is the belief that he was one of the Hyksos, who are called the Amalekites in ancient Arabic books. In the Middle Ages, the history of the Pharaohs was not well-known among the peoples.

== See also ==
- Daluka
- Surid ibn Salhouk
- Ar-Rayyan ibn al-Walid
