= Jesualdo Ferreira =

Portuguese football manager (born 1946)

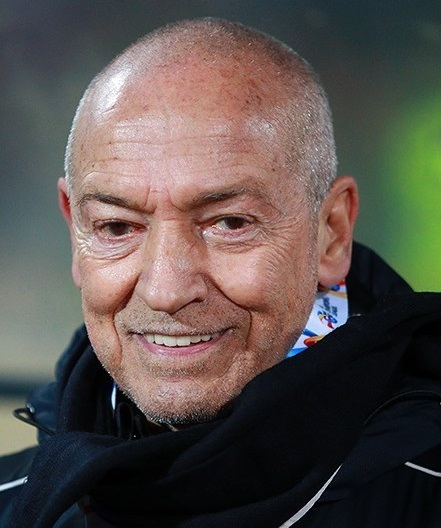
- Ferreira with Al Sadd in 2017

Personal information
- Full name: Manuel Jesualdo Ferreira
- Date of birth: 24 May 1946 (age 80)
- Place of birth: Mirandela, Portugal

Managerial career
- Years: Team
- 1981–1982: Rio Maior
- 1982–1984: Torreense
- 1984: Académica
- 1985–1986: Atlético
- 1986: Silves
- 1986–1987: Torreense
- 1987–1989: Benfica (assistant)
- 1989: Angola
- 1989–1990: Torreense
- 1991: Estrela da Amadora
- 1990–1992: Portugal (assistant)
- 1992–1994: Benfica (assistant)
- 1994–1995: Bordeaux (assistant)
- 1995–1996: FAR Rabat
- 1996–2000: Portugal U21
- 2000–2001: Alverca
- 2001–2002: Benfica (assistant)
- 2002: Benfica
- 2003–2006: Braga
- 2006: Boavista
- 2006–2010: Porto
- 2010: Málaga
- 2010–2012: Panathinaikos
- 2013: Sporting CP
- 2013–2014: Braga
- 2015: Zamalek
- 2015–2019: Al Sadd
- 2019–2020: Santos
- 2020–2021: Boavista
- 2022–2023: Zamalek
- 2023: Zamalek

Manuel Jesualdo Ferreira (born 24 May 1946) is a Portuguese football manager.

In a managerial career of over forty years, he was in charge of all of his country's Big Three and had his greatest successes at Porto, where he became the first manager to win three consecutive Primeira Liga titles and also lifted the Taça de Portugal twice. He won two Egyptian Premier League titles and as many national cups at Zamalek, as well as a Qatar Stars League title and three domestic cups at Al Sadd. Additionally, he managed Angola and teams in Morocco, Spain, Greece and Brazil.

== Coaching career ==
=== Early career ===
Born in Mirandela, Ferreira moved to Angola at early age but later returned to Portugal due to the Angolan War of Independence. He then played as a midfielder for Ovarense's youth setup, but retired at the age of 20 to obtain his coaching qualifications. After studying in Lisbon at the Superior Institute of Physical Education (he later would work there as a teacher), he joined the Portuguese Football Federation in late 1974 to work with the youth categories.

In 1979, Ferreira joined Benfica as a youth football coordinator. In 1981 he started his career as a manager, taking over Rio Maior of the Segunda Divisão, and later worked at fellow league team Torreense for two seasons before being appointed manager of Primeira Liga side Académica de Coimbra in 1984.

Ferreira was dismissed from Académica after matchday seven with the balance of one victory and six defeats, being replaced by Vítor Manuel who led the team to a final seventh-place position. He also coached Atlético CP and Silves before returning to Torreense in 1986; the following year, he rejoined Benfica as new manager Toni's assistant.

In 1989, after a short stint in charge of the Angola national team (where his first name was spelled as Gesualdo), Ferreira returned to Torreense for a third spell. He later worked at Estrela da Amadora while also being one of Artur Jorge's assistants at the Portugal national team; the club, however, was relegated to Liga de Honra in the 1990–91 season. In 1992, after Toni was again appointed manager of Benfica, Ferreira joined his staff as his assistant.

In 1994, Ferreira followed Toni to France, as the latter was appointed manager of Bordeaux. Both went to separate ways in 1995, as Ferreira took over Moroccan side FAR Rabat He led team to the Moroccan Throne Cup final, and subsequently worked as Portugal under-21 national team manager.

=== Alverca and Benfica ===
Ferreira arrived at Alverca in 2000–01, where he took the team to 12th place in the Primeira Liga. With good results, Ferreira then left for Benfica for the 2001–02 season; initially an assistant to Toni, he took over the club on 29 December 2001 after Toni was sacked.

In November 2002, after a poor string of results, Ferreira was fired by Benfica president Luís Filipe Vieira after being knocked out of the Taça de Portugal at home to third division side Gondomar. He was replaced by the Spanish manager José Antonio Camacho.

=== Braga ===
On 19 April 2003, Braga hired Ferreira to manage the team, then on the brink of relegation. He led Braga to a 14th-place finish, only two points above relegation zone. In the 2003–04, 2004–05 and 2005–06 seasons, Braga made fantastic league runs, and with players like João Tomás and Wender, they fought for the title in 2004–05. Braga reached fifth place (2003–04) and twice in fourth place (2004–05 and 2005–06).

=== Porto ===
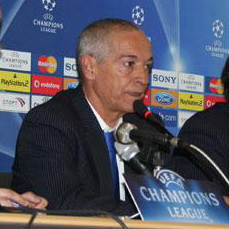
Ferreira with Porto in 2006

In May 2006, Boavista signed Ferreira after his tenure with Braga ended, but suddenly Porto and its team president, Jorge Nuno Pinto da Costa, offered him a contract following the unexpected departure of manager Co Adriaanse. Ferreira terminated his contract with Boavista and joined Porto at the Estádio do Dragão on 18 August 2006, after the Supertaça Cândido de Oliveira final, only one week before the start of the 2006–07 league. There, Ferreira worked with such stars as Ricardo Quaresma, Anderson, Pepe, Lucho González, Raul Meireles, Paulo Assunção, José Bosingwa and Lisandro López.

Despite having little time to adjust to his new club or changing the team's tactical approach who, under Adriaanse, played in a very offensive 3–3–4 system, Ferreira still managed to win the league title in his first year at the club, finishing only one point ahead of Sporting Clube de Portugal and two of Benfica. In the UEFA Champions League, Porto reached the first knockout round but were eliminated by Chelsea, 2–3 on aggregate.

The 2007–08 season saw a great run by a Porto team that won the league championship with a 20-point margin over second-placed Sporting, despite later being deducted six points due to the bribery of referees in the 2003–04 season. In Europe, Ferreira once again took Porto to the first knockout round of the Champions League after finishing first in a group that included Liverpool, being eliminated by German side Schalke 04 on penalties following a 1–1 aggregate draw.

The 2008–09 season was another successful year for the club under Ferreira, with Porto reaching the fourth consecutive league title in a row, Jesualdo's third, making him the first Portuguese manager ever to win three consecutive Portuguese league championships. In addition, Porto also achieved a domestic double, beating Paços de Ferreira 1–0 in the final of the Taça de Portugal thanks to a goal by Lisandro López. In the Champions League, Porto reached the quarter-finals, topping a group that included Arsenal, and beating Atlético Madrid on away goals in the Round of 16, before being knocked out by then-title holders Manchester United 2–3 on aggregate. That season's performance rewarded Ferreira with a two-year contract extension.

Despite previous success, 2009–10 was not a solid season for os Dragões, with the team losing their first league title since 2005 to rivals Benfica, but also finishing third in the league, which meant they failed to secure a Champions League spot for the following season. Despite this, Porto won both the Taça de Portugal and Supertaça Cândido de Oliveira, in addition to recording a 3–1 home victory over fierce rivals Benfica at the end of the season. Nonetheless, Ferreira resigned on 26 May 2010.

=== Málaga ===
On 17 June 2010, Málaga of the Spanish La Liga signed Ferreira on a three-year contract after he rescinded his deal at Porto. After nine domestic league matches, with the team winless in six games and 18th in the table, he was sacked on 2 November.

=== Panathinaikos ===
Ferreira was then hired by Greek club Panathinaikos, signing a 1 1/2-year contract on 20 November 2010. Ferreira came in to replace Nikos Nioplias, who was sacked after disappointing results in the Super League Greece and the group stage of Champions League.

After his love with the team, Ferreira stayed as the head coach of Panathinaikos despite the financial problems and the break inside the team's operation. After failing to qualify for the 2011–12 Champions League in the third qualifying round, he kept the spirit and beliefs and had Panathinaikos first in the first round of Super League and second final to the play-offs. Ferreira was later offered a new 1+1-year contract, but he later resigned from his role on 14 November 2012.

=== Sporting CP ===
A month after Ferreira resigned from Panathinaikos, Sporting CP hired him for an administrative position where he would run all of Sporting's football teams. On 7 January 2013, however, after Sporting had sacked its manager Franky Vercauteren after a long string of mediocre results, Ferreira was named his replacement. Just months later, on 20 May, Leonardo Jardim was announced as the new manager of the Lisbon club; consequently, Ferreira was immediately sacked.

=== Return to Braga ===
In May 2013, Ferreira was the choice of Braga club president António Salvador to manage the club and leading the reshuffling of the professional team after a disappointing season that ended with a non-qualification for the 2013–14 Champions League. Ferreira, having previously served as Salvador's first manager in his presidential term in 2003, became the first to coach the team on two different occasions under Salvador. On February, after a draw against Arouca at the Estádio Municipal de Braga, Ferreira left the club due to the string of bad results.

=== Zamalek ===
In February 2015, Ferreira was appointed as head coach of Zamalek SC. He led the club to their 12th Egyptian Premier League title, their first league title since 2004, and led the club to win a domestic double by beating Al Ahly 2–0, in the Egypt Cup final. He could not, however, repeat this feat against Al Ahly again in the Egyptian Super Cup, as they lost 3–2 to their arch rival. Ferreira resigned from Zamalek on 21 November 2015.

=== Al Sadd ===
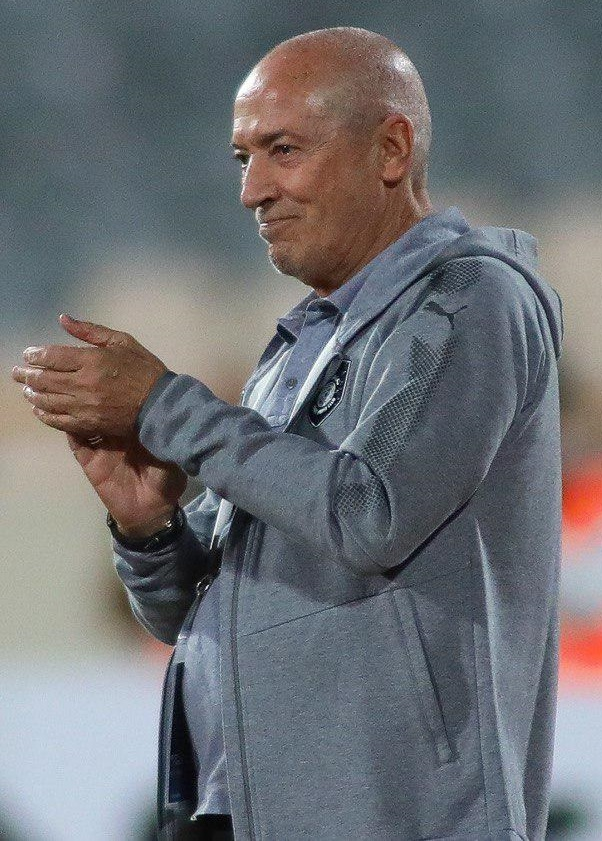
Ferreira in action with Al Sadd in 2019

On 28 November 2015, Ferreira was named the head coach of Al Sadd SC, on a six-month deal with the option of a further year. Having won the 2018–19 Qatar Stars League with a game to play, he left the team in May and was replaced by Xavi.

=== Santos ===
On 23 December 2019, Ferreira was named manager of Campeonato Brasileiro Série A side Santos FC, after signing a one-year contract. The following 5 August, after being knocked out of the 2020 Campeonato Paulista, he was sacked.

=== Return to Boavista ===
On 14 December 2020, Ferreira signed up for his first job in Portugal for over six years, replacing Vasco Seabra at Boavista until June 2022. He helped the club avoid any relegation threat on the final day of the season and became the oldest manager in Primeira Liga, with the championship concluding just before he turned 75. He agreed to end his contract a year early in June 2021, to allow the club to bring in João Pedro Sousa.

=== Return to Zamalek ===
In March 2022, Ferreira returned to Zamalek on an 18-month deal, replacing Patrice Carteron. On 21 July, his team won the delayed 2021 Egypt Cup Final 2–1 against rivals Al Ahly led by compatriot Ricardo Soares, and a month later the team won the league title ahead of Pyramids FC. On 24 January 2023, he was sacked from his position after a 2–1 defeat against Ghazl El Mahalla. Eight days later, he returned as Zamalek manager. On 22 March, he was sacked for the second time in the same season after a 2–0 defeat against CR Belouizdad, which resulted in a CAF Champions League group stage exit.

== Relationship with Mourinho ==
Ferreira and former Porto manager José Mourinho first crossed paths in the 1980s, when Mourinho was a student at the Lisbon Superior Institute for Physical Education and Ferreira was a teacher there. In 2000, when Mourinho was briefly the manager of Benfica, he refused to accept the appointment of Ferreira as his assistant, and in February 2005, Mourinho had a swipe at Ferreira in his weekly column for the Portuguese sports magazine Record.

Comparing himself with Ferreira, Mourinho wrote,

"One is a coach with a 30-year career, the other with a three-year one. The one with 30 years has never won anything; the one with three years has won a lot. The one who has coached for 30 years has an enormous career; the one with three years has a small career. The one with a 30-year career will be forgotten when he ends it; the one with three could end it right now and he could never be erased from history. This could be the story of a donkey who worked for 30 years but never became a horse."

Despite these claims by Mourinho, Ferreira went on to make history by becoming the first Portuguese coach to win three consecutive titles in Portugal, a feat that Mourinho never achieved (although Mourinho never managed the same club in Portugal for three full consecutive seasons). Mourinho also was Ferreira's assistant in 1990–91, for Estrela da Amadora.

Another Porto coach, José Couceiro, worked with Ferreira many times. Firstly, Ferreira was a coach in Atlético Clube de Portugal, and Couceiro was a player there. Couceiro moved to Torreense, with Ferreira as coach. And finally, in 1991–92, Couceiro joined Estrela da Amadora, again with Ferreira as coach.

== Managerial statistics ==
As of 22 March 2023

Managerial record by team and tenure
Team	Nat.	From	To	Record								Ref
Team	Nat.	From	To	G	W	D	L	GF	GA	GD	Win %	Ref
Rio Maior	(Portugal)	June 1981	June 1982	32	12	9	11	30	30	+0	37.50	
Torreense	(Portugal)	June 1982	June 1984	70	30	17	23	76	75	+1	42.86	
Académica de Coimbra	(Portugal)	June 1984	22 October 1984	7	1	0	6	7	16	−9	14.29	
Atlético CP	(Portugal)	September 1985	13 January 1986	15	4	4	7	13	18	−5	26.67	
Silves	(Portugal)	February 1986	June 1986	11	2	4	5	9	2	+7	18.18	
Torreense	(Portugal)	June 1986	June 1987	35	13	13	9	47	39	+8	37.14	
Angola	(Angola)	January 1989	September 1989	8	1	2	5	7	13	−6	12.50	
Torreense	(Portugal)	December 1989	June 1990	24	13	8	3	42	11	+31	54.17	
Estrela Amadora	(Portugal)	4 February 1991	11 November 1991	27	8	9	10	28	34	−6	29.63	
FAR Rabat	(Morocco)	July 1995	June 1996	30	11	12	7	24	26	−2	36.67	
Portugal U21	(Portugal)	June 1996	July 2000	33	19	5	9	64	36	+28	57.58	
Alverca	(Portugal)	July 2000	29 June 2001	37	13	8	16	50	57	−7	35.14	
Benfica	(Portugal)	29 December 2001	24 November 2002	30	16	7	7	65	32	+33	53.33	
Braga	(Portugal)	19 April 2003	8 May 2006	122	56	33	33	153	114	+39	45.90	
Boavista	(Portugal)	9 May 2006	15 August 2006	0	0	0	0	0	0	+0	—	
Porto	(Portugal)	18 August 2006	26 May 2010	186	125	30	31	354	138	+216	67.20	
Málaga	(Spain)	17 June 2010	2 November 2010	10	2	2	6	14	21	−7	20.00	
Panathinaikos	(Greece)	20 November 2010	14 November 2012	90	48	19	23	126	86	+40	53.33	
Sporting CP	(Portugal)	7 January 2013	20 May 2013	18	10	3	5	26	20	+6	55.56	
Braga	(Portugal)	31 May 2013	24 February 2014	30	16	3	11	51	32	+19	53.33	
Zamalek	(Egypt)	2 February 2015	21 November 2015	36	26	6	4	67	22	+45	72.22	
Al Sadd	(Qatar)	28 November 2015	20 May 2019	129	80	26	23	356	164	+192	62.02	
Santos	(Brazil)	23 December 2019	5 August 2020	15	6	4	5	17	16	+1	40.00	
Boavista	(Portugal)	13 December 2020	30 June 2021	25	7	7	11	28	35	−7	28.00	
Zamalek	(Egypt)	5 March 2022	24 January 2023	52	31	13	8	81	37	+44	59.62	
Zamalek	(Egypt)	1 February 2023	22 March 2023	9	2	2	5	6	12	−6	22.22	
Career total				1,081	552	246	283	1,741	1,086	+655	51.06	—

== Managerial honours ==
=== Club ===
Porto

- Primeira Liga: 2006–07, 2007–08, 2008–09
- Taça de Portugal: 2008–09, 2009–10
- Supertaça Cândido de Oliveira: 2009

Zamalek

- Egyptian Premier League: 2014–15, 2021–22
- Egypt Cup: 2014–15, 2020–21

Al Sadd

- Qatar Stars League: 2018–19
- Qatar Cup: 2017
- Qatar Emir Cup: 2017
- Qatar Super Cup: 2017

=== Individual ===
- CNID Best Portuguese League Coach: 2006–07, 2007–08, 2008–09
- Best coach in the Egyptian league: 2014–15
- Qatar Stars League Manager of the Year: 2017, 2019

== See also ==
- List of football managers with the most matches
