= Khui =

Ancient Egyptian pharaoh

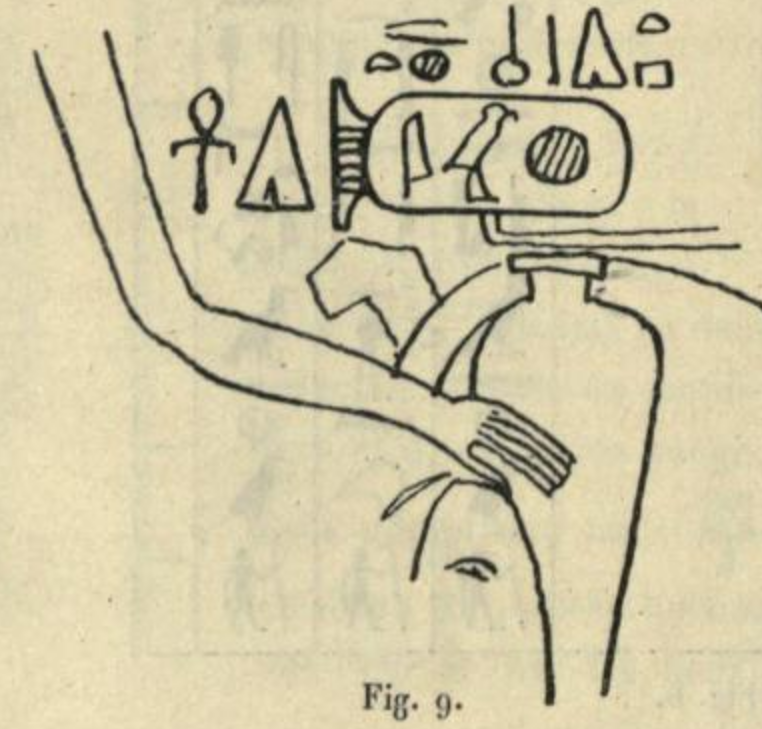
- Relief fragment with the cartouche of Khui from a mastaba in Dara

Nomarch or Pharaoh
- Reign: c. 2150 BC
Royal titulary
Nomen
Khui
ḫwj
The protector
< Aa1 G43 i >
- Burial: Possibly Pyramid of Khui
- Dynasty: Possibly 8th Dynasty or a local kinglet

Khui (fl. c. 2150 BC) was an ancient Egyptian king and/or nomarch during the early First Intermediate Period. Khui may have belonged to the Eighth Dynasty of Egypt, as Jürgen Beckerath has proposed, or he may instead have been a provincial nomarch who proclaimed himself king.

== Attestation ==
Khui is not known from historical sources and the only certain attestation of his existence is a fragmentary relief on a stone block showing his cartouche which was published in 1912 by the Egyptologist Ahmed Bey Kamal and later republished by Raymond Weill. The block was excavated from a mastaba tomb of the necropolis of Dara near Manfalut. This necropolis is dominated by a massive funerary structure which was hastily attributed to this obscure king (the so-called Pyramid of Khui), assuming that the block came from its almost disappeared mortuary temple.

== King or nomarch ==
Based on the cartouche surrounding Khui's name on the relief from Dara, Egyptologists including Jürgen Beckerath have proposed that he was a king of the early First Intermediate Period, belonging to the Eighth Dynasty.

On the other hand, Egyptologists Barry Kemp and Toby Wilkinson believe it more likely that Khui was a nomarch, that is a provincial governor, who took advantage of the power vacuum following the collapse of the Old Kingdom and proclaimed himself king, in the same way as the coeval and neighboring Heracleopolite founders of the 9th Dynasty.

== Bibliography ==
- Jürgen von Beckerath, Chronologie des pharaonischen Ägypten, Zabern Verlag Mainz, 1994, p. 151. ISBN 3-8053-2310-7.
- Thomas Schneider, Lexikon der Pharaonen, Düsseldorf, Albatros Verlag, 2002, p. 104. ISBN 3-491-96053-3.
