= Daluka =

Legendary queen of Egypt

- Predecessor: Al-Walid ibn Mus'ab
- Dynasty: Soleyman dynasty

Daluka, also known as Dalukah or Daluka bint Zaba (Arabic: دلوكة بنت زباء), was the queen of Egypt who ruled after the Exodus according to medieval Coptic and Islamic folklore. She was part of the so-called "Soleyman dynasty", which also included Surid Ibn Salhouk, a king who was once believed to have built the Great Pyramid of Giza.

Arab sources like Ibn Abd al-Hakam and others mention that she ruled Egypt after most men of Egypt died in the Exodus, and that she succeeded the Amalekite king Al-Walid ibn Mus'ab who the Egyptians at the time used to call "Talma ibn Qumus".

== Background ==
=== Egyptian and Arab traditions ===
According to a history of the Arab conquest of Egypt written by Ibn Abd al-Hakam (801–871), Daluka was said to be the builder of the Lighthouse of Alexandria, although the famous Cleopatra was sometimes considered to be the builder instead. Daluka's name was often used synonymously with that of Cleopatra or Nitocris in medieval Arabic texts. Both Daluka and Cleopatra were believed to have built a wall around Egypt to protect it from invasion. This wall was called "Ha'it-el-Agouz" (Wall of the Old Woman) and extended from Aswan in the south to al-Arish in the north and a channel was dug behind it. She placed guard posts and garrisons every three miles, and between them small guard posts every mile. She placed men in every guard post, assigned them provisions, and ordered them to guard their land by night and day. She ordered the men of the guard posts to use bells. If one of them saw an enemy creeping toward Egypt, or sensed approaching danger, they would strike their bells, and the news would pass from post to post, from tower to tower, through a connected chain of sounds, until news of the invasion reached the heart of Egypt, to the city of Memphis, “in one hour,” and everyone would prepare to face the enemy. Daluka was also said to have built a nilometer at Memphis and at least one pyramid in Egypt.

Arab Sources, like al-Abbasi al-Safadi (died in 717 A.H.) in Page 56 of his book "The Recreation of the Owner and the Owned", mentions that Daluka adopted “the barabi and images” in Egypt and perfected the instruments of magic. The "barabi" are the temples or strange buildings she built in the city of Memphis, with four doors in its four directions, and she decorated their walls with strange and wondrous images. In them she drew images of men, horses, mules, donkeys, ships, and boats; she depicted whoever came from every direction and their mounts, whether camels or horses; and she also depicted whoever came by sea in boats from the sea of the Maghreb and Syria.

He describes the mechanism of these magical images, saying that “if an army came to them from…” a certain direction, the images in that direction would move, as if warning them of the place of danger. More wondrous still, what they did to these images—tearing or destroying them—would strike the invading army itself in reality. If they cut off the head of an image, the head of the enemy commander would be cut off; if they gouged out its eye, the eye of the invading army would be gouged out; and if they slit open its belly, the bellies of the soldiers would be slit open.

These "barabi" were stronger than any army and deadlier than any weapon, and no king of the earth was able to defeat Egypt throughout Daluka’s reign because of them. Sources mention that Daluka enlisted in building these "barabi" a great sorceress named “Tadura” or “Tadhura,” whom the sorcerers revered and gave precedence in magic. She came to them and made for them this stone house in the middle of the city of Memphis.

It is said that when Daluka built these "barabi", she stipulated to the sorceress that she make for her magic that would prevent enemies. The sorceress agreed, but on the condition that women marry their slaves and hired laborers, and that they not cut off offspring, so that Egypt would not become extinct and be emptied of men forever.

Ibn Abd al-Hakim says in his book "The Conquests of Egypt and the Maghreb" in Page 49:

The Egyptian woman would free her slave and marry him, and another would marry her hired laborer. But the ladies of Egypt stipulated upon these “second-class” husbands that they not undertake any matter except with their permission, nor make any decision except after returning to them—otherwise, woe, ruin, and great calamities upon the men.

Ibn Abd al-Hakim says that the Copts remained like that until his day—that is, until his era in the third century After Hijrah. —following those who had passed before them. None of them would sell or buy without saying: “I shall consult my wife”.

German Jesuit scholar Athanasius Kircher (1602–1680) mentioned the legend of Daluka and the fortress she built in Alexandria in his 1652 work Oedipus Aegyptiacus. According to Kircher, Daluka reigned after the Pharaoh drowned in the Red Sea while pursuing the Israelites. This event saw the deaths of thousands of Egyptian men, and Daluka was chosen from among the many widows of these men to rule Egypt. She was the daughter of a man named Zabu, who was illustrious and knowledgeable of many things. According to Kircher, Daluka ruled for twenty years and was succeeded by a man named Darkun, who was one of the magnates, and reigned for thirty years. this is in agreement with the 9th century historian Al-Ya'qubi, who wrote that Daluka was the direct successor of the Pharaoh of the Exodus, who, according to the Quran, drowned. The people of Egypt elected Daluka as their queen, fearing outside invasion, she built a wall surrounding Egypt, which was reported by Al-Masudi to still exist in his day, albeit as ruins, calling it "Ha'it al-Ajüz (The Old Woman's Wall)."

When Daluka was named as part of a longer king list, she was usually listed as one of the monarchs who ruled Egypt before the Great Flood. At least one king list claimed she succeeded a king called "Nimrod" (not to be confused with the Biblical Nimrod), although some Coptic sources were unsure about her chronological placement. Some texts place her reign long after the Great Flood. According to The Prodigies of Egypt, written by 12th century Arab writer Murtada ibn al-'Afif, Daluka (named "Dalic" in this text) ascended to the throne after the death of her cousin, queen Charoba, who died unmarried. According to this narrative, Daluka ruled for seventy years. Egyptologist Ahmed Kamal compiled a list of names of ancient Egyptian kings from Arabic sources in 1903 and placed her after the period of the Great Flood, numbering her the 75th ruler of Egypt.

=== Ethiopian version ===
An Ethiopian regnal list written in 1922 included Daluka under the name "Eylouka" as part of the 'Tribe of Ori' who reigned before the Great Flood and claimed she ruled Aethiopia for 45 years from 3776 to 3731 BC. The 'Tribe of Ori' is clearly inspired by the Coptic tradition of the "Soleyman dynasty" that ruled Egypt prior to the Great Flood. Historian Manfred Kropp believed that the Ethiopian king list was written by foreign minister Heruy Wolde Selassie, who used European and Arab sources in an attempt to synchronize Ethiopian history with the wider Christian-Oriental histories. The inclusion of the "Soleyman dynasty" in the 1922 Ethiopian king list may have been due to Louis J. Morié's 1904 book Historie de l'Éthiopie, which showed a significant amount of influence in the narrative of the king list. Morié himself believed that the kings of the "Soleyman" dynasty were rulers of Aethiopia, although he used this word to refer to ancient Nubia rather than present-day Ethiopia.

== See also ==
- Surid Ibn Salhouk
- Cleopatra
