= Surid Ibn Salhouk =

Legendary king

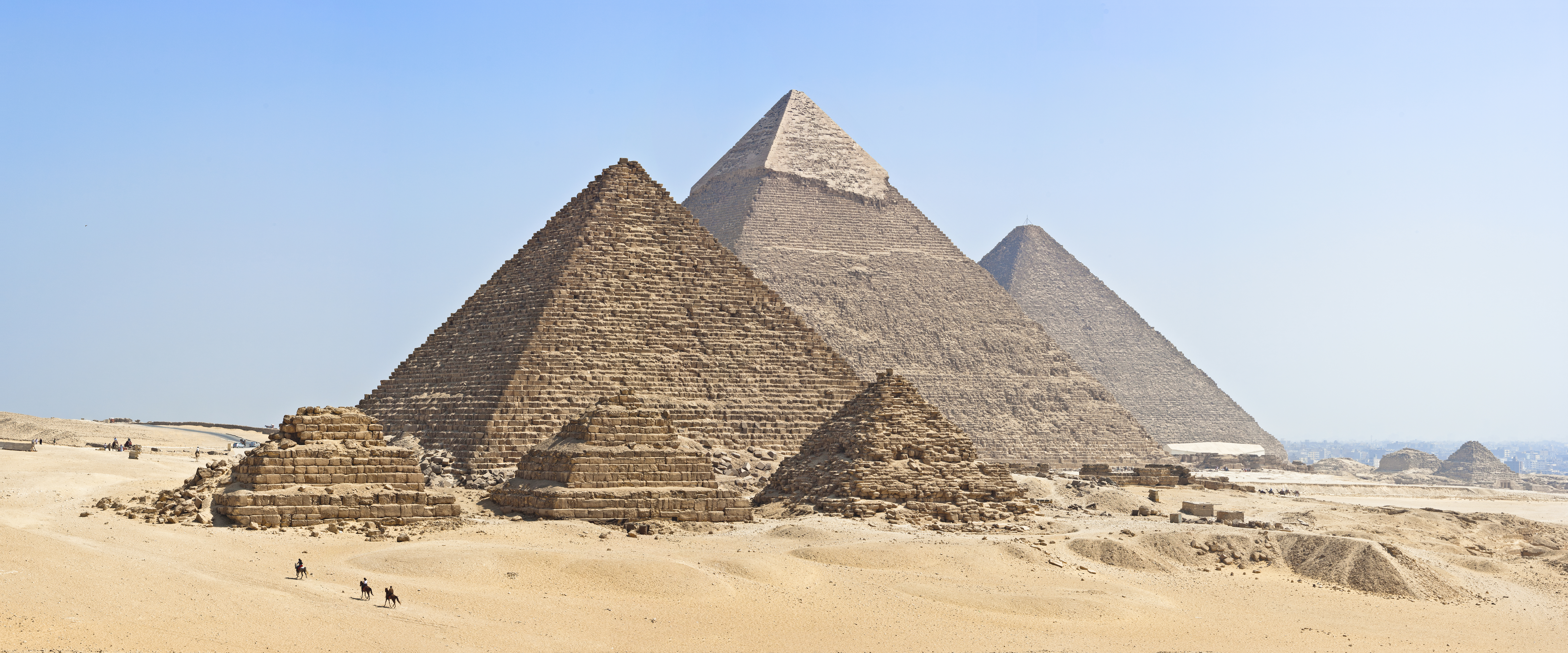
Surid Ibn Salhouk was a folkloric king in Arabian Literature credited in the medieval era as the builder of the Pyramids of Giza. Tradition says a dream of the Flood of Noah led him to build the pyramids as his tomb and storehouse of Egyptian knowledge.

Surid ibn Salhouk (Arabic: سوريد بن سلهوق, also known as Saurit, Sourid, Saurid, and more commonly known as Surid ibn Salhouq) is a folkloric king from medieval Coptic and Islamic lore who is said to have lived 300 years before the biblical flood. Among other achievements, Surid was often credited with building the Pyramids of Giza, structures that, in the Middle Ages, were believed by many to predate the biblical flood narrative.

The name "Surid" derives from the earlier name Souphis used by Manetho in his work Aegyptiaca to refer to the historical Pharaoh Khufu, who was buried in the Great Pyramid. In legends, Surid was often conflated with or identified as the biblical prophet Enoch, the Muslim prophet Idris, or Hermes Trismegistus.

== Legend ==
One legend in particular relates how, prior to the Deluge, Surid had a terrifying dream of the world's end: In this dream, the "fixed stars had come down," and they "had grabbed the people and had hurled them between two mountains. These [then] closed over [the people] and the shining stars had become dark and gloomy." After consulting with his trusted advisor Philemon, Surid is said to have ordered the construction of the pyramids so that they could serve as his tomb and also house all the knowledge of Egypt, ensuring its survival during the flood.

Al-Maqrizi writes of this, saying in his Khitat, that it took Surid merely six months to build the pyramids, and that he then wrapped them in coloured brocade, on which he wrote: “We built them in six months; tell him who comes after us to destroy them in six hundred years! For destroying is easier than building. We also draped them with colored brocade; let him drape them with mats! For mats are of less value than brocade."

Arabian historian Yaqut al-Hamawi (1179 CE–1229 CE) claimed in his book Mu'jam al-Buldan (Lexicon of Countries) that Hujib (Khafre) was the son of Surid and was buried in the middle pyramid at Giza, while Karuras (Menkaure) was the son of Hujib and was buried in the smallest of the three main Giza pyramids.

== Historical reception ==
According to modern scholar Martyn Smith, "The story of Surid and his antediluvian construction of the pyramids assigns to them a place in sacred history and establishes a neutral narrative ground upon which Muslims and Christians could agree".

== See also ==
- Ar-Rayyan ibn al-Walid
- Al-Walid ibn Mus'ab
- Daluka
- Khufu
