= Al-Kashif Mosque =

Mosque in Manfalut, Egypt

- مسجد علي الكاشف جمال الدين
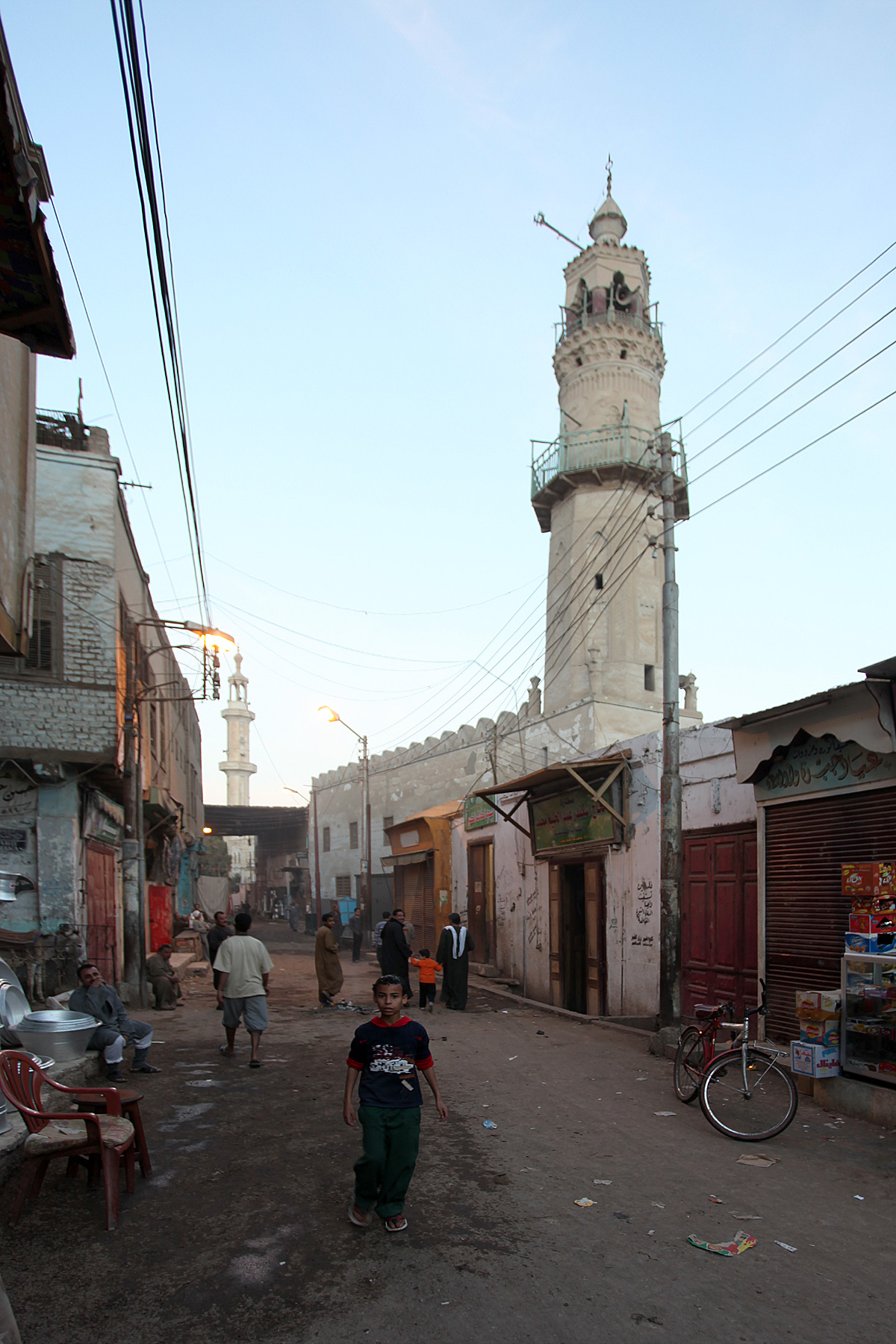

Religion
- Affiliation: Islam
- Ecclesiastical or organisational status: Mosque and mausoleum
- Status: Active

Location
- Location: Manfalut
- Country: Egypt
- Interactive map of Al-Kashif Mosque
- Coordinates: 27.3129°N 30.9718°E

Architecture
- Type: Mosque
- Completed: 1862

The Mosque of Ali al-Kashif Jamal al-Din (Arabic: مَسْجِد الكاشف, romanized: Masjid al-Kashif) is an Ottoman-era mosque in Manfalut, Egypt. It was built during Muhammad Ali's reign in 1811.

== History ==
The mosque was established by Ali al-Kashif, governor of Asyut at the time. It was built in Al-Qaysraiyah district, a very prominent commercial neighborhood in the city. The inscription plaque in the mosque asks for worshippers to pray for the governor. Ali came from a rich family, as his father Jamal al-Din was one of the city's rich merchants. The mosque faced extensive restorations in the past, leaving only the minaret in its original form. In 2019, the government restored the mosque once again.

== Description ==
The mosque is square in shape. Its main entrance is built of brick and is located on the northern side of the mosque. Above the entrance are calligraphic decorations as well as windows made from finely turned wood. The other three facades of the mosque have multiple turned wood windows high in the walls, and there are other openings and windows below them as well.

The prayer hall is divided by two rows of red granite columns supporting a painted timber ceiling, incorporates a mihrab decorated with Ottoman ceramic tiles, and also contains a wooden minbar. The mosque's three-story red brick minaret consists a square base and octagonal upper tiers topped with a wooden spire and brass crescent.

== Gallery ==
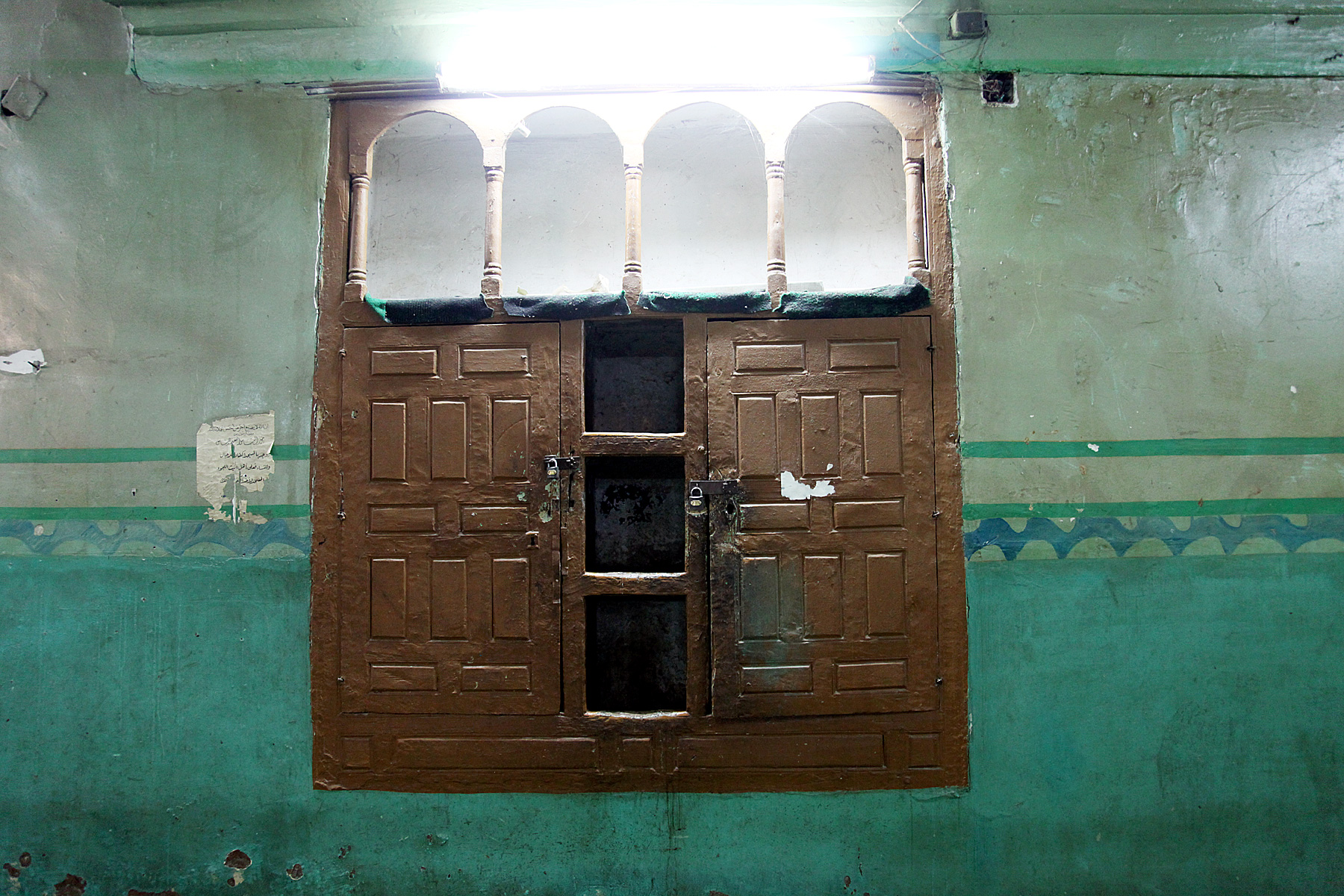
Cupboard of the mosque

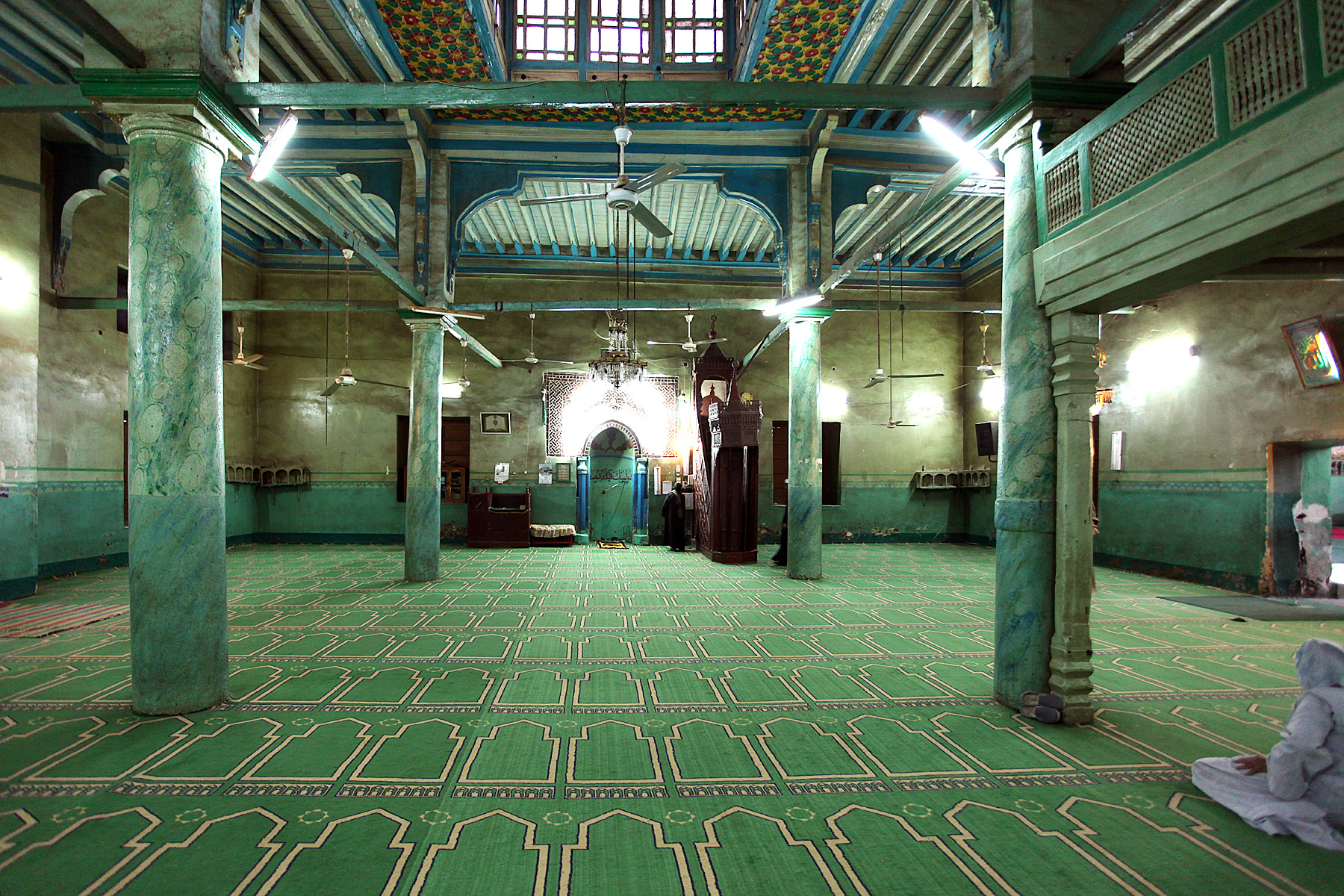
Prayer hall of the mosque

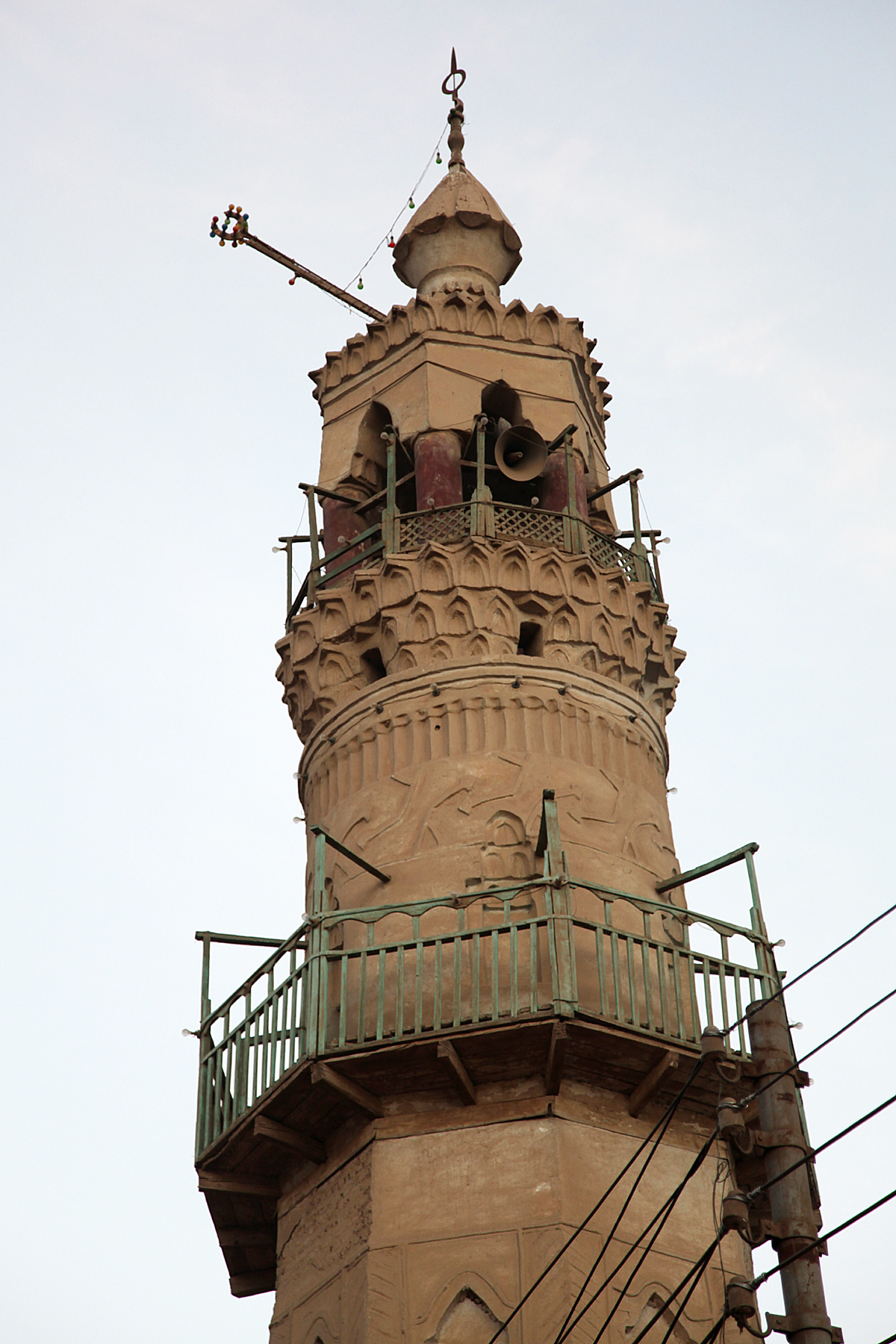
Minaret of the mosque

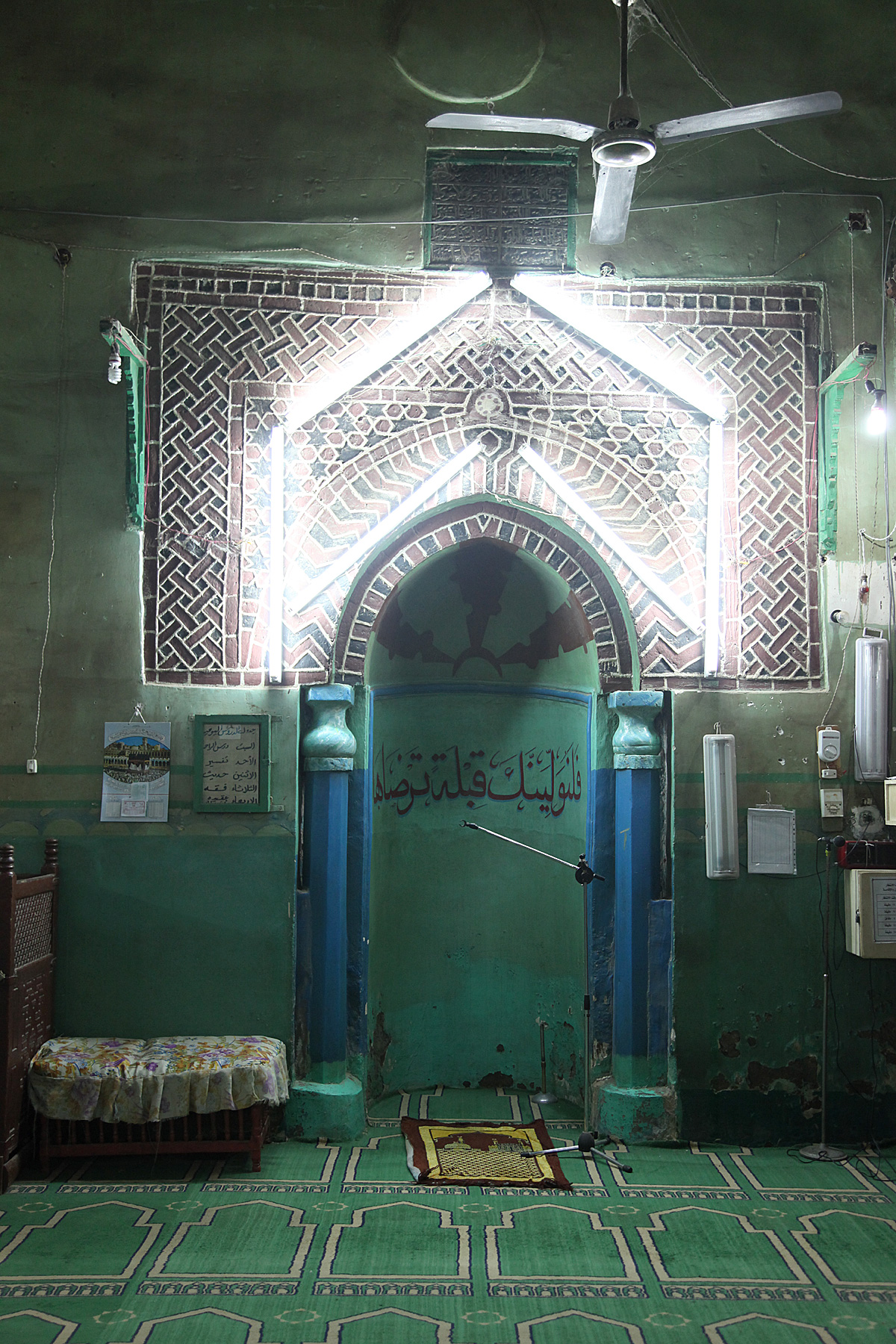
Qibla of the mosque

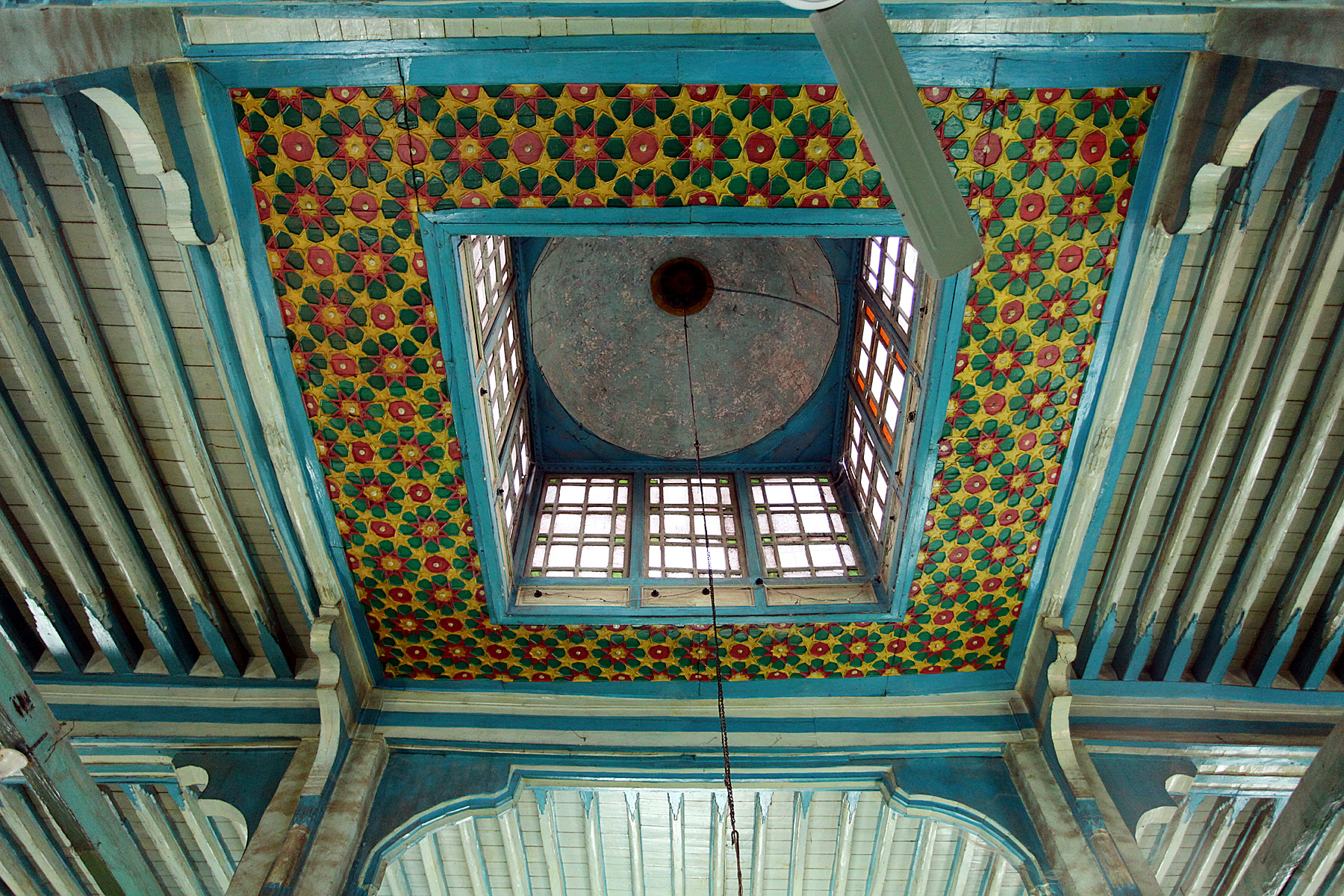
Roof of the mosque
