= Ibrahim Abdel Khalek =

Egyptian footballer (born 1986)

Personal information
- Date of birth: 20 April 1986 (age 40)
- Place of birth: Alexandria, Egypt
- Height: 1.77 m (5 ft 10 in)
- Position: Midfielder

Team information
- Current team: Entag El Harby
- Number: 22

Senior career*
Years	Team	Apps	(Gls)
2008–2009	Abou Qir Fertilizers		
2010–2015	El Raja		
2010–2015	Smouha	98	(11)
2015–2017	Zamalek	18	(1)
2016–2017	→ Wadi Degla (loan)	11	(0)
2017	→ Al Mokawloon (loan)	12	(0)
2017–2019	Ismaily	10	(3)
2018–2019	→ Wadi Degla (loan)	19	(3)
2019–	Entag El Harby	4	(0)

International career^{‡}
2013–	Egypt	4	(0)
- * Club domestic league appearances and goals as of 20:59, 7 November 2019 (UTC) ‡ National team caps and goals as of 5 March 2014

Ibrahim Abdel Khalek (إبراهيم عبد الخالق; born 20 April 1986) is an Egyptian football right midfielder who plays for Egyptian Premier League side El Entag El Harby SC as well as the Egyptian national team.

== Club career ==
=== Zamalek ===
Abdel Khalek made his debut for Zamalek on 15 August 2015 and scored in the 3–1 away win against Haras El-Hodood in the Round of 16 of the 2015 Egypt Cup.

== International career ==
He made his international debut for Egypt in March 2013 against Qatar. He was called up again for the national team in March 2014 for a friendly game against Bosnia.

== Honors ==
Zamalek SC

- Egypt Cup : 2014-15
