= Ahmed El Saidy =

Egyptian footballer (born 1992)

Ahmed El Siady
Personal information
- Date of birth: April 15, 1992 (age 34)
- Position: Centre forward

Team information
- Current team: El-Entag El-Harby

Senior career*
Years	Team	Apps	(Gls)
- Gomhoriat Shebin
–2014	ENPPI		
2014–2016	Al Nasr SC		
2016–2017	Ismaily	20	(0)
2017–	El-Entag El-Harby		
- * Club domestic league appearances and goals as of 11 October 2017

Ahmed El Siady (Arabic: أحمد الصعيدي; born April 15, 1992) is an Egyptian professional footballer who plays as a centre forward for the Egyptian club El-Entag El-Harby. He played for Gomhoriat Shebin in Egyptian Second Division before moving to ENPPI. In 2014, Al Nasr signed him in a free agent transfer for 3 years, but he moved to Ismaily after two years and signed a 5-year contract, he managed to score only 1 goal in 22 matches with the club. In 2017, he joined El-Entag El-Harby with a 3-year contract.
