= Ahmed Kamal (scientist) =

Indian scientist

First Pro Vice-Chancellor of Jamia Hamdard
- Incumbent
- Assumed office 2017–2021
- Preceded by: "office established"
- Scientific career
- Born: 5 April 1956 (age 70); Hyderabad, Telangana, India
- Citizenship: India
- Education: Osmania University, Aligarh Muslim University
- Awards: CSIR Young Scientist Award in Chemical Sciences

Dr. Ahmed Kamal (born 5 April 1956 in Hyderabad, Telangana) better known as Ahmed Kamal is the first Pro-Vice Chancellor of Jamia Hamdard since 2017, a Scientist at the Indian Institute of Chemical Technology (IICT), Hyderabad and a former visiting scientist at the University of Alberta, Edmonton, Canada. He is also a Fellow of National Academy of Sciences, India and Royal Society of Chemistry.

== Education and research ==
Ahmed Kamal is a graduate of Osmania University, Hyderabad (India) from where he obtained his Master's degree in Organic Chemistry. He did his Ph.D. in the area of Medicinal Chemistry from the Aligarh Muslim University.

He is the author of several research papers.
