= Ahmed Hassan Mekky =

Egyptian footballer (born 1987)

Personal information
- Full name: Ahmed Hassan Mekky
- Date of birth: 20 April 1987 (age 39)
- Place of birth: Kafr El-Dawwar, Egypt
- Height: 1.82 m (6 ft 0 in)
- Position: Striker

Youth career
- 2006–2007: Haras El-Hodood SC

Senior career*
Years	Team	Apps	(Gls)
2007–2015	Haras El-Hodood SC	94	(44)
2013–2014	→ Al-Ahli SC (Tripoli) (loan)	??	(??)
2015–2016	Zamalek SC	7	(3)
2016–	Smouha SC	26	(6)
2019–	→ El Gouna (loan)	3	(1)

International career
2010–	Egypt	25	(5)
- * Club domestic league appearances and goals

Ahmed Hassan Mekky (born 20 April 1987) is an Egyptian footballer. He last played as a striker for the Egyptian club Al-Mokawoloon Al-Arab SC. He announced his retirement in January, 29th 2023.

== Club career ==
=== Haras El-Hodood ===
Mekki joined Haras El-Hodood in 2006. He is a versatile striker who has scored 44 goals in 94 matches for Haras Al Hoodood first team since joining them on 1 July 2007.

Mekki stated that he hoped to be allowed to sign for German side VFB Stuttgart, but his club refused to release him.

=== Zamalek SC ===
Mekki signed a 4-year contract with Zamalek SC on 28 July 2015, he made his debut on 18 August 2015, he scored the winning penalty against Al Ittihad in the Quarterfinals of the 2015 Egypt Cup, giving Zamalek their seat in Semifinals.

== International career ==
Mekki was selected for the Egypt national squad for the first time in a match against Congo in 2010.

== International goals ==
Correct as of 8 June 2015

#	Date	Venue	Opponent	Score	Result	Competition
1.	31 March 2012	Al Merreikh Stadium, Omdurman, Sudan	Chad	4 – 0	4 – 0	Friendly
2.	12 April 2012	Al-Maktoum Stadium, Abu Dhabi, UAE	Nigeria	3 – 2	3 – 2	Friendly
3.	11 May 2012	Rashid Karami Stadium, Tripoli, Lebanon	Lebanon	2 – 0	4 – 1	Friendly
4.	15 August 2012	Al-Saada Stadium, Salalah, Oman	Oman	1 – 0	1 – 1	Friendly
–	22 March 2013	Borg El Arab Stadium, Alexandria, Egypt	Swaziland	5–0	10–0	Unofficial friendly
–	22 March 2013	Borg El Arab Stadium, Alexandria, Egypt	Swaziland	9–0	10–0	Unofficial friendly
5.	8 June 2015	Borg El Arab Stadium, Alexandria, Egypt	Malawi	1 – 0	2 – 1	Friendly

== Honors ==
=== Club ===
Haras El-Hodood

- Egypt Cup: 2008–09, 2009-10
- Egypt Super Cup: 2009

Zamalek SC

- Egypt Cup: 2014-15, 2015-16
