= Abdel Aziz Emam =

Egyptian footballer (born 1989

Personal information
- Full name: Abdel Aziz Emam
- Date of birth: 22 May 1989 (age 37)
- Place of birth: Egypt
- Position: Midfielder

Team information
- Current team: Aswan
- Number: 10

Senior career*
Years	Team	Apps	(Gls)
–2009	Sohag		
2009–2014	Aluminium Nag Hammâdi		
2014–2016	Petrojet	20	(4)
2016	El Dakhleya	1	(0)
2016–2017	Al Nasr Lel Taa'deen	29	(4)
2017–2019	Smouha	11	(0)
2019–	Aswan	0	(0)
- * Club domestic league appearances and goals

Abdel Aziz Emam (Arabic: عبد العزيز إمام, born 22 May 1989) is an Egyptian footballer who plays for Aswan SC as a midfielder.
