= Ahmed Kamal (footballer) =

Egyptian footballer (born 1981)

Personal information
- Date of birth: October 29, 1981 (age 45)
- Place of birth: Cairo, Egypt
- Height: 1.86 m (6 ft 1 in)
- Position: Left-back

Team information
- Current team: Haras El Hodood
- Number: 4

Youth career
- Zamalek

Senior career*
Years	Team	Apps	(Gls)
2001–2002	Zamalek	15	(1)
2002–	Haras El Hodood	242	(9)

International career^{‡}
2009–	Egypt	2	(0)
- * Club domestic league appearances and goals ‡ National team caps and goals as of 29 December 2009

Ahmed Kamal (Arabic: احمد كمال) is an Egyptian football defender who plays for Haras El Hodood.

He has been called up for Egypt for a friendly match against Guinea on August 12, 2009, he made his debut in this match he came from the bench for Sayed Moawad which was ended a 3–3 draw.
