= Ar-Rayyan ibn al-Walid =

Legendary king in medieval Arabic folklore

Ar-Rayyān ibn al-Walīd (Arabic: الريان بن الوليد), also called Nahrāūs, is a legendary king from medieval Islamic lore who is said to have been one of the Amalekite rulers of Egypt. According to the historians who transmitted stories of him, he was the king whom the biblical prophet Joseph served under. Medieval Arab historians credited him with the construction of the Babylon Fortress.

The name Ar-Rayyan is an Arabic male name which is derived from the similarly named gate of paradise in Islamic lore, where the pious who fasted a lot would enter on the Day of Resurrection. It has an alternative origin as a Persian name; being the plural form of the word Rāy which means "kings."

Ar-Rayyan was reportedly the second of a line of Amalekite kings, succeeding his father who had conquered Egypt. It is also related that before the arrival of Joseph, Ar-Rayyan was a formerly competent and wise ruler who became dominated by his passions and left the government to be handed to Potiphar. After the imprisonment of Joseph, Ar-Rayyan had a dream which no one, not even the high priests, could interpret, except for Joseph who told him that a famine would be coming and advised him on how it could be prevented. Impressed, the king made Joseph as his chief advisor and also became an adherent to the Judaic monotheism preached by Joseph. Ar-Rayyan died of old age and was succeeded by his son Dārim, who, unlike his father, was an idolator and fell into tyranny. An alternative version of the tradition states that Ar-Rayyan was succeeded by a king named Qabus, who was an idolator and a tyrant. Regardless, both traditions agree that the succeeding king was a stubborn tyrant.

There have been attempts to identify Ar-Rayyan with historical figures. Egyptian historian and museum curator Ahmad Kamal identified Ar-Rayyan with the Hyksos ruler Khyan, basing his identification off the reading of Khyan's cartouche as Ne Re Ous, which, according to Kamal, was "strikingly similar" to Nahrāūs. On the other hand, archeologist Hossam Abdolfotouh identifies him with Seti I from the Nineteenth Dynasty, while his son and successor Darim/Qabus is identified with Ramesses II, with the later Pharaoh of the Exodus being identified as Ramesses V instead.

== In popular culture ==
The Wadi El Rayan nature reserve in Fayoum is named after Ar-Rayyan ibn al-Walid, based on a legend where the king and his army sat down there to rest.

A fictionalized version of Ar-Rayyan ibn al-Walid appears as a supporting character in the live-action Prophet Joseph television series, played by Iranian actor Rahim Norouzi.

== See also ==
- Khyan
