= Manfalut =

Manfalut منفلوط ⲙⲁⲛⲃⲁⲗⲟⲧ
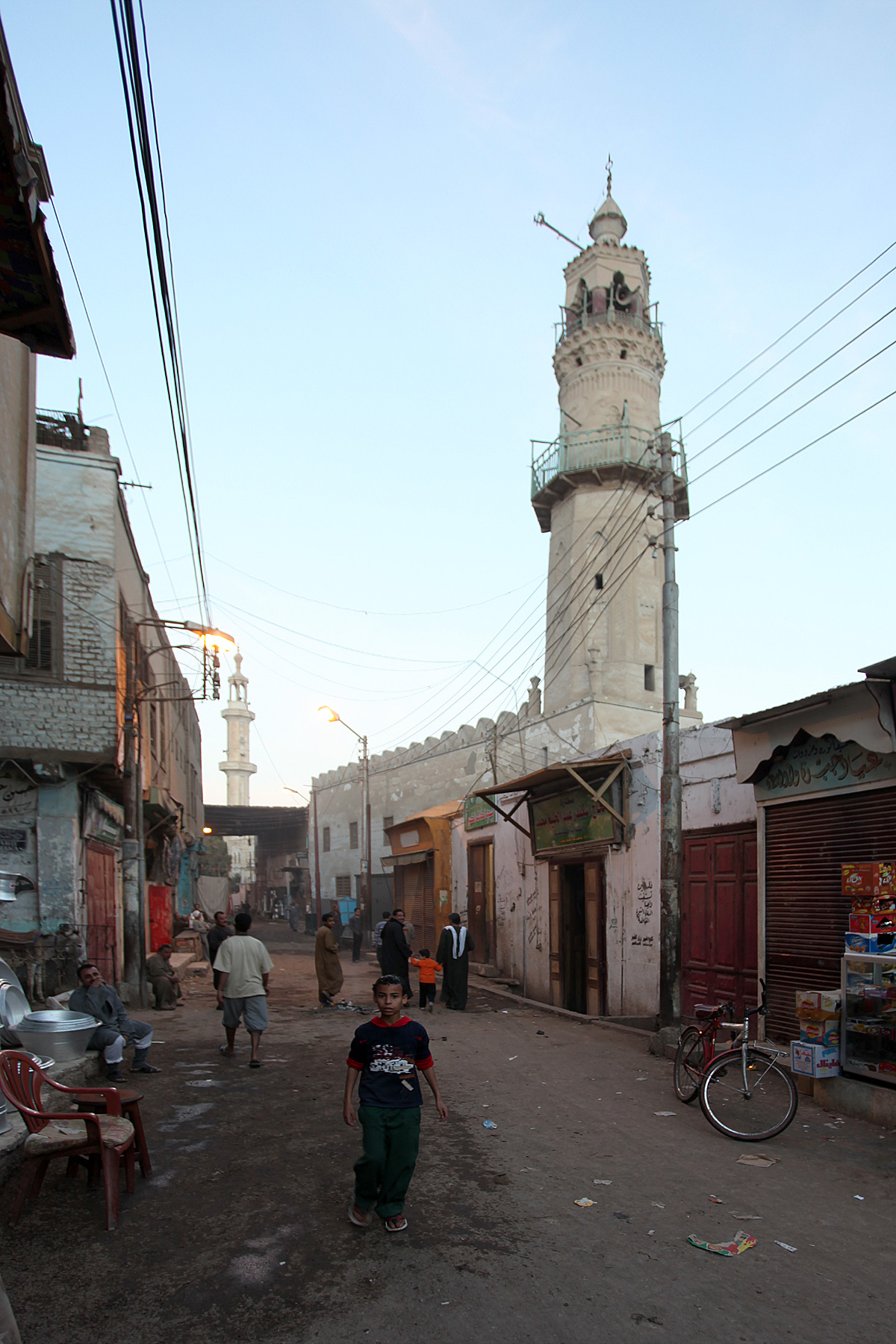

- Location in Egypt
- Coordinates: 27°19′N 30°58′E
- Country: Egypt
- Governorate: Asyut

Area
  - Total: 103.5 sq mi (268.1 km^{2})

Population (2021)
  - Total: 576,972
  - Density: 5,574/sq mi (2,152/km^{2})
- Time zone: UTC+2 (EET)
  - Summer (DST): UTC+3 (EEST)

Manfalut (Arabic: منفلوط Manfalūṭ, IPA: [mɑnfɑˈluːtˤ]; Coptic: ⲙⲁⲛⲃⲁⲗⲟⲧ, lit. 'place of pelts, skins') is a city in Egypt. It is located on the west bank of the Nile, in the Asyut Governorate. The city is at 350 km (230 miles) south of Cairo. In 2006, it had a population of 82,585 people.

Local agriculture includes cotton production.

Egyptian writer and poet Mustafa Lutfi al-Manfaluti was born in Manfalut. By 1993, the area was considered an Islamic stronghold.

On 17 November 2012, a bus-train collision near Manfalut caused the deaths of 51 people.

== See also ==
- List of cities and towns in Egypt
- Pyramid of Khui
