= Ahmed Kamal (Egyptologist) =

Egyptian Egyptologist

Pasha Ahmed Kamal
- احمد كامل باشا
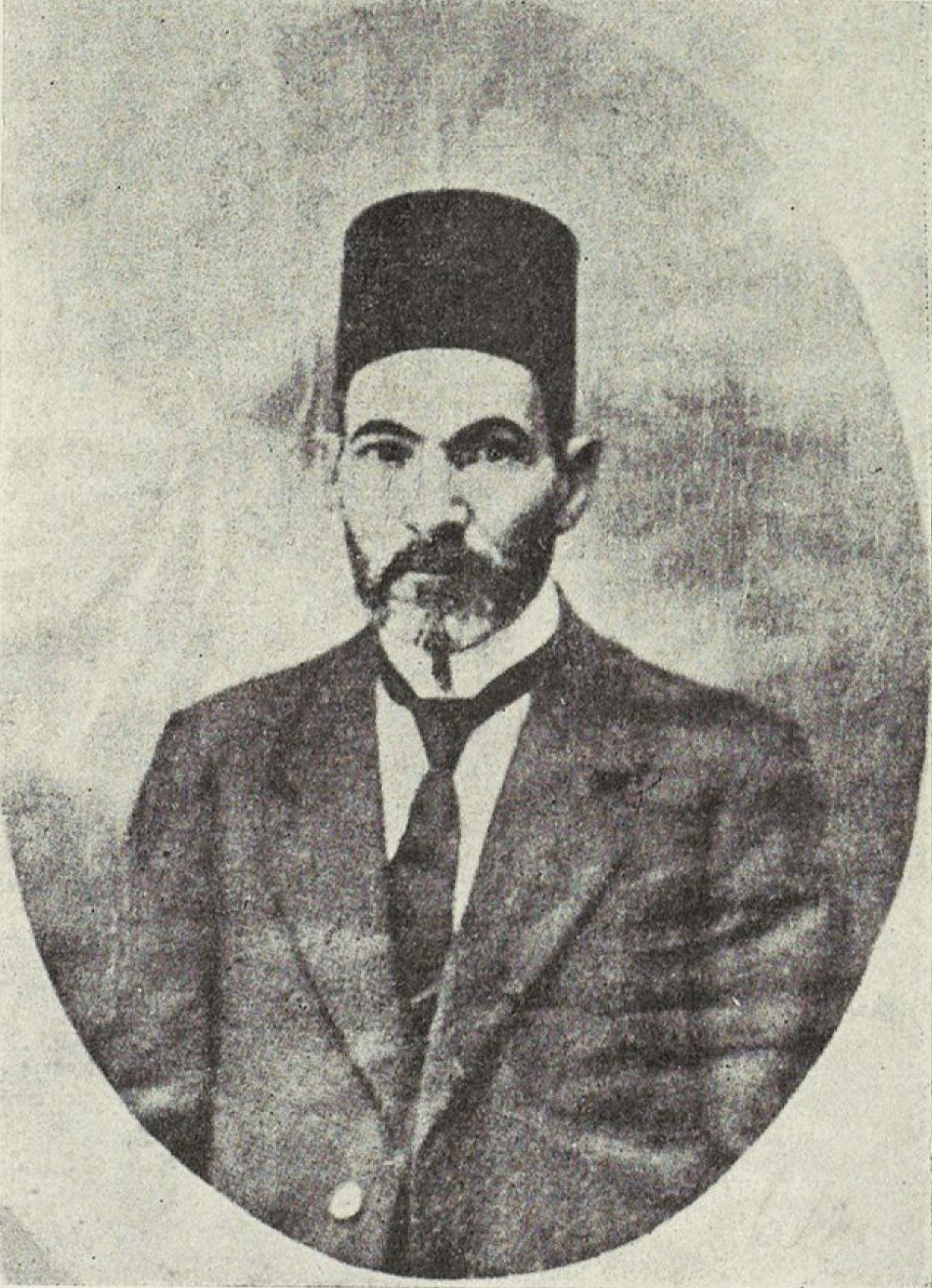
- Born: July 29, 1849; Cairo
- Died: August 5, 1923 (aged 74); Cairo
- Citizenship: Egyptian
- Education: School of Administration (Madrasat al-Idara) School of Ancient Egyptian Language (Brugsch School)
- Occupations: Egyptologist, Archeologist, Linguist
- Years active: 1869-1923
- Employer: Heinrich Brugsch
- Known for: Discovery of the only known attestation of pharaoh Khui
- Notable work: Stèles ptolémaiques et romaines (1904–1905) Dictionary of the Ancient Egyptian Language
- Children: 6

Ahmed Kamāl (Arabic: أحمد كمال, July 29, 1849 – August 5, 1923) was a prominent Egyptian Egyptologist and historian, widely regarded as the first native Egyptian Egyptologist. Born in 1849 and passing in 1923, he was among the earliest Egyptians to professionally study and document ancient Egypt in the modern times at a time when the field was dominated by European scholars.

== Early life and career ==
Ahmed Kamal was born in Egypt during the 19th century to an Egyptian middle class family, a time of growing European interest and influence in his country. He studied at the School of Administration and later received training in Egyptology under foreign scholars. His fluency in Arabic, French, Turkish and German enabled him to bridge Western academic approaches with Egyptian heritage.

== Research ==
He trained under the German Egyptologist Heinrich Brugsch. He was a curator at the Egyptian Museum in Cairo and a staff member of the Supreme Council of Antiquities. He was jointly responsible for the Egyptian collections' classification and significantly involved in the museum's removal from both Boulaq to Giza and Giza to the Tahrir Square at Cairo's city center.

He took part in several excavations at Dayr al-Barsha, Gabal at-Tayr, Tihna el-Gebel, Gamhud, Atfih, Mayr, El-Sheikh Sa'id, Asyut, Dara, Amarna as well as in the Nile Valley. In Dara, he discovered the only known attestation of pharaoh Khui.

== Contributions to Egyptology ==
Kamal is best known for his comparative analysis of ancient Egyptian hieroglyphs and the Egyptian Arabic language. His groundbreaking methodology involved transliterating hieroglyphs into Arabic letters, which allowed Egyptian scholars and the general public to engage with ancient texts in their native language.

One of his most notable achievements was the compilation of a twenty-two-volume dictionary, which included explanations in both Arabic and French. The dictionary listed Arabic words that corresponded in meaning and pronunciation to ancient Egyptian hieroglyphs, illustrating possible linguistic connections between the two languages.

He referred to the fact that more than 12,000 words from the Modern Egyptian Arabic (also known as Masri) dialect are rooted in the Ancient Egyptian language. Kamal's efforts were groundbreaking, especially his assertion of linguistic connections between ancient Egyptian and Semitic languages, as both belong to the same Afro-Asiatc language tree.

Kamal's work aimed to democratize access to Egypt's ancient heritage. He sought to raise public awareness and encourage ordinary Egyptians to study their history in Egyptian Arabic rather than relying on foreign languages and interpretations. His efforts were part of a broader movement to reclaim Egyptology as an Egyptian-led discipline.

Despite resistance from many non-Egyptian archaeologists – who often lacked knowledge of Arabic or any Afro-Asatic Language – Kamal's work had a lasting influence. Scholars such as Antoine Zekry and Ahmed Naguib adopted his transliteration methodology, furthering the use of Arabic in Egyptological scholarship.

=== Challenges ===
Ahmed Kamal's career unfolded during a colonial era in which Egyptology was largely dominated by British and French institutions. Despite the structural and political obstacles he faced, Kamal's work laid the foundation for a uniquely Egyptian approach to the study of antiquity.

His legacy continues to inspire Egyptian scholars and remains a crucial milestone in the indigenization of Egyptology. Kamal is widely regarded as a foundational figure in the effort to make Egypt's ancient history accessible to its people through their own language and cultural perspective.

== Personal life ==
Ahmed Kamal was married and had a family comprising three sons and three daughters. His grandson, Abdel-Hamid Kamal Zakaria, has been instrumental in preserving and promoting his grandfather's legacy, including donating Ahmed Kamal's comprehensive dictionary of the ancient Egyptian language to the Bibliotheca Alexandrina.

== Honors and recognition ==
He was granted the honorific title “Pasha” in recognition of his distinguished service, a title typically awarded to high-ranking officials during the Khedival and early royal periods of Egypt. His legacy remains influential, and he is remembered as a foundational figure in the Egyptian national scholarly tradition of Egyptology.

== Legacy ==
In addition to his educational and scholarly contributions, Kamal inadvertently highlighted cognitive linguistic links between ancient Egyptian and modern Egyptian Arabic. His research demonstrated the persistence of ancient Egyptian loanwords in contemporary speech, suggesting a deeper continuity in Egypt's linguistic heritage.

Known for his politeness and dedication, Ahmed Kamal was deeply committed to making Egypt's ancient heritage accessible to his fellow Egyptians. His efforts laid the foundation for a national approach to Egyptology, inspiring future generations of Egyptian scholars such as Monica Hanna, whom she considers as her inspiration.

== Portrayals in cinema ==
In Shadi Abdel Salam's 1969 film Al-Mummia (also known as The Night of Counting the Years), the character Ahmed Kamal, portrayed by actor Mohamed Khairi, represents Egypt's first native Egyptologist, Ahmed Kamal Pasha. Within the narrative, Kamal is depicted as a young archaeologist dispatched from Cairo by the French Egyptologist Gaston Maspero to investigate the illicit trade of ancient artifacts emerging from Upper Egypt. His role is pivotal in the film's exploration of national identity and the ethical dilemmas surrounding the preservation of cultural heritage.

== Important publications ==
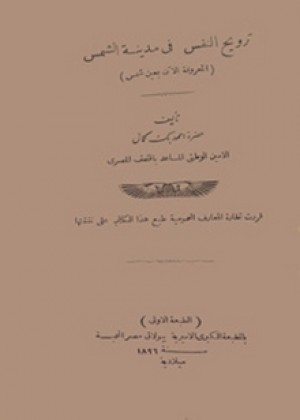
Ahmed Kamal's 1899 work on ancient Heliopolis.

- Kamal, Ahmed (1899). "حفريات وتاريخ مدينة عين شمس" [Excavations and history of the city of Ain Shams]. In Mubarak, Ali (ed.). الخطط التوفيقية الجديدة [al-Khiṭaṭ al-Tawfīqīyah al-Jadīda (encyclopedia on geography, topography, and history of Egypt)] (in Arabic). Vol. 15.
- Kamal, Ahmed (1904–1905). Stèles ptolémaiques et romaines. N^{os} 22001-22208. Catalogue général des antiquités égyptiennes du Musée du Caire (in French). Vol. 1–2. Le Caire: l'Institut français d'archéologie orientale.
- Kamal, Ahmed (1906–1909). Tables d'offrandes. N^{os} 23001-23256. Catalogue général des antiquités égyptiennes du Musée du Caire (in French). Vol. 1–2. Le Caire: l'Institut français d'archéologie orientale.
- Kamal, Ahmed Bey (1912). "Fouilles à Dara et à Qoçéîr el-Amarna". Annales du Service des Antiquités de l'Égypte (in French). 12: 128–142.
- Kamal, Ahmed Bey (1903–1907). "Héliopolis et son mur d'enceinte". Bulletin de la Société khédiviale de géographie (in French). 6 (6): 281–312.
