= Corporal punishment =

Punishment intended to cause physical pain

A corporal punishment or a physical punishment is a punishment which is intended to cause physical pain to a person. When it is inflicted on minors, especially in home and school settings, its methods may include spanking or paddling. When it is inflicted on adults, it may be inflicted on prisoners and slaves, and can involve methods such as whipping with a belt or a horsewhip.

Physical punishments for crimes or injuries, including floggings, brandings, and even mutilations, were practised in most civilizations since ancient times. They have increasingly been viewed as inhumane since the development of humanitarian ideals after the Enlightenment, especially in the Western world. By the late 20th century, corporal punishment was eliminated from the legal systems of most developed countries.

The legality of corporal punishment in various settings differs by jurisdiction. Internationally, the late twentieth and early twenty-first centuries saw the application of human rights law to the question of corporal punishment in several contexts:

- Corporal punishment in the home, the punishment of children by parents or other adult guardians, is legal in most of the world. As of 2023, 65 countries, mostly in Europe and Latin America, have banned the practice.
- School corporal punishment, of students by teachers or school administrators, such as caning or paddling, has been banned in many countries, including Canada, Kenya, South Africa, New Zealand and all of Europe. It remains legal, if increasingly less common, in some states of the United States and in some countries in Africa and Southeast Asia.
- Judicial corporal punishment, such as whipping or caning, as part of a criminal sentence ordered by a court of law, has long disappeared from most European countries. As of 2021, it remains lawful in parts of Africa, Asia, the Anglophone Caribbean and indigenous communities in several countries of South America.
- Prison corporal punishment or disciplinary corporal punishment, ordered by prison authorities or carried out directly by correctional officers against the inmates for misconduct in custody, has long been a common practice in penal institutions worldwide. It has officially been banned in most Western civilizations during the 20th century, but is still employed in many other countries today. Punishments such as paddling, foot whipping, or different forms of flagellation have been commonplace methods of corporal punishment within prisons. This was also common practice in the Australian penal colonies and prison camps of the Nazi regime in Germany.
- Military corporal punishment was once common. Only a few jurisdictions still allow it.

In many Western countries, medical and human rights organizations oppose the corporal punishment of children. Campaigns against corporal punishment have aimed to bring about legal reforms to ban the use of corporal punishment against minors in homes and schools.

== History ==
=== Prehistory ===
Author Jared Diamond writes that hunter-gatherer societies have tended to use little corporal punishment, whereas agricultural and industrial societies tend to use progressively more of it. Diamond suggests this may be because hunter-gatherers tend to have few valuable physical possessions, and misbehavior of the child would not cause harm to others' property.

Researchers who have lived among the Parakanã and Ju/'hoansi people, as well as some Aboriginal Australians, have written about the absence of the physical punishment of children in those cultures.

Wilson writes:

Probably the only generalization that can be made about the use of physical punishment among primitive tribes is that there was no common procedure [...] Pettit concludes that among primitive societies corporal punishment is rare, not because of the innate kindliness of these people but because it is contrary to developing the type of individual personality they set up as their ideal [...] An important point to be made here is that we cannot state that physical punishment as a motivational or corrective device is 'innate' to man.

=== Antiquity ===
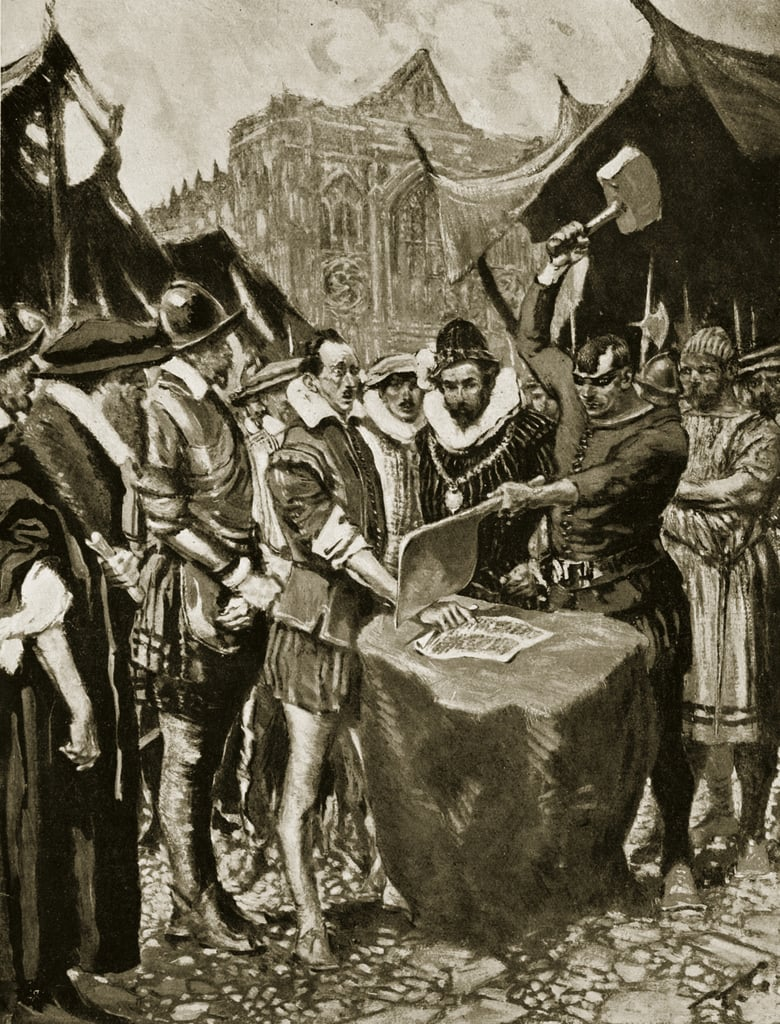
John Stubbs has his hand cut off, England, 1579

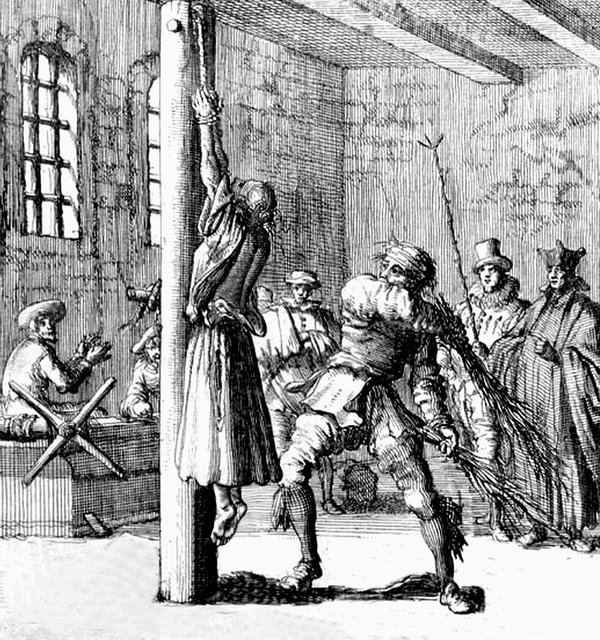
Birching, Germany, 17th century

In the Western world, the corporal punishment of children has traditionally been used by adults in authority roles. Beating one's son as a form of punishment is even recommended in the book of Proverbs:

He that spareth the rod, hateth his son; but he that loveth him, chasteneth him betimes. (Proverbs 13:24)

A fool's lips enter into contention, and his mouth calleth for strokes. (Proverbs 18:6)

Chasten thy son while there is hope, and let not thy soul spare for his crying. (Proverbs 19:18)

Foolishness is bound in the heart of a child, but the rod of correction shall drive it from him. (Proverbs 22:15)

Withhold not correction from the child; for if thou beatest him with a rod, thou shalt deliver his soul from hell. (Proverbs 23:13–14)

— (Note: It has been debated among scholars as to whether what is encouraged in the book of Proverbs is the corporal punishment of a "child" or a "young man". The word translated "child" in most cases in the Bible refers to a young man rather than a child.)

The meaning and application of these verses are the subject of theological and hermeneutical debate:

1. Historical-literal perspective: Some scholars and historians interpret these texts as reflecting common pedagogical methods in the ancient Near East, where moderate corporal punishment was accepted as a normative practice of education and formative discipline.

2. Linguistic and metaphorical perspective: Several contemporary theologians and biblical scholars argue that the use of the word "rod" (shebet in Hebrew) should not be understood as a commandment of physical violence, but rather as a symbol of the pastor's authority, guidance, and protection. From this perspective, the term "discipline" (musar) emphasizes moral instruction, character development, and the establishment of boundaries, contrasting with parental neglect or abandonment.

Robert McCole Wilson argues that, "Probably this attitude comes, at least in part, from the desire in the patriarchal society for the elder to maintain his authority, where that authority was the main agent for social stability. But these are the words that not only justified the use of physical punishment on children for over a thousand years in Christian communities, but also ordered it to be used. The words were accepted with but few exceptions; it is only in the last two hundred years that there has been a growing body of opinion that differed. Curiously, the gentleness of Christ towards children (Mark, X) was usually ignored".

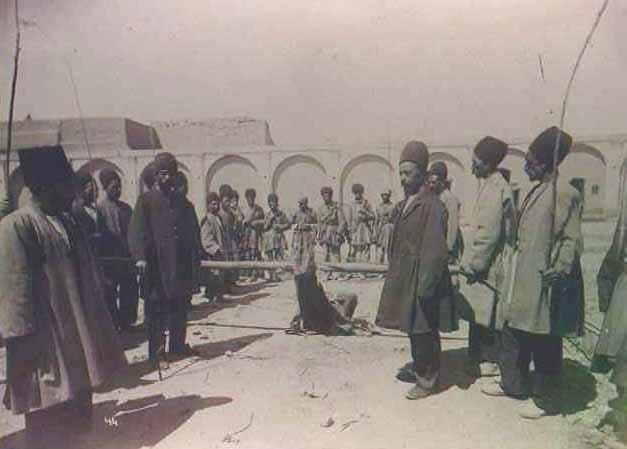
Foot whipping an offender, Persia, 1910s

Corporal punishment was practised in Egypt, China, Greece, and Rome to maintain judicial and educational discipline. Disfigured Egyptian criminals were exiled to Tjaru and Rhinocorura on the Sinai border, a region whose name meant "cut-off noses." Corporal punishment was prescribed in ancient Israel, but it was limited to 40 lashes. In China, some criminals were also disfigured, but other criminals were tattooed. Some states gained a reputation for their cruel use of such punishments; Sparta, in particular, used them as part of a disciplinary regime which was designed to increase willpower and physical strength. Although the Spartan example was extreme, corporal punishment was possibly the most frequent type of punishment. In the Roman Empire, the maximum penalty which a Roman citizen could receive under the law was 40 "lashes" or 40 "strokes" with a whip which was applied to the back and shoulders, or 40 lashes or strokes with the "fasces" (similar to a birch rod, but consisting of 8–10 lengths of willow rather than birch) which were applied to the buttocks. Such punishments could draw blood, and they were frequently inflicted in public.

Quintilian (c. 35 – c. 100) voiced some opposition to the use of corporal punishment. According to Wilson, "probably no more lucid indictment of it has been made in the succeeding two thousand years".

By that boys should suffer corporal punishment, though it is received by custom, and Chrysippus makes no objection to it, I by no means approve; first, because it is a disgrace, and a punishment fit for slaves, and in reality (as will be evident if you imagine the age change) an affront; secondly, because, if a boy's disposition be so abject as not to be amended by reproof, he will be hardened, like the worst of slaves, even to stripes; and lastly, because, if one who regularly exacts his tasks be with him, there will not be the need of any chastisement (Quintilian, Institutes of Oratory, 1856 edition, I, III).

Plutarch, also in the first century, writes:

This also I assert, that children ought to be led to honourable practices by means of encouragement and reasoning, and most certainly not by blows or ill-treatment, for it surely is agreed that these are fitting rather for slaves than for the free-born; for so they grow numb and shudder at their tasks, partly from the pain of the blows, partly from the degradation.

=== Middle Ages ===
In Medieval Europe, the Byzantine Empire blinded and removed the noses of some criminals and rival emperors. Their belief that the emperor should be physically ideal meant that such disfigurement notionally disqualified the recipient from office. (The second reign of Justinian the Slit-nosed was the notable exception.) Elsewhere, corporal punishment was encouraged by the attitudes of the Catholic church towards the human body, flagellation being a common means of self-discipline. This influenced the use of corporal punishment in schools, as educational establishments were closely attached to the church during this period. Nevertheless, corporal punishment was not used uncritically; as early as the 11th century Saint Anselm, Archbishop of Canterbury was speaking out against what he saw as the excessive use of corporal punishment in the treatment of children.

=== Modernity ===
From the 16th century onwards, new trends were seen in corporal punishment. Judicial punishments were increasingly turned into public spectacles, with public beatings of criminals intended as a deterrent to other would-be offenders. Meanwhile, early writers on education, such as Roger Ascham, complained of the arbitrary manner in which children were punished.

Peter Newell writes that perhaps the most influential writer on the subject was the English philosopher John Locke, whose Some Thoughts Concerning Education explicitly criticised the central role of corporal punishment in education. Locke's work was highly influential and may have helped influence Polish legislators to ban corporal punishment from Poland's schools in 1783, the first country in the world to do so.

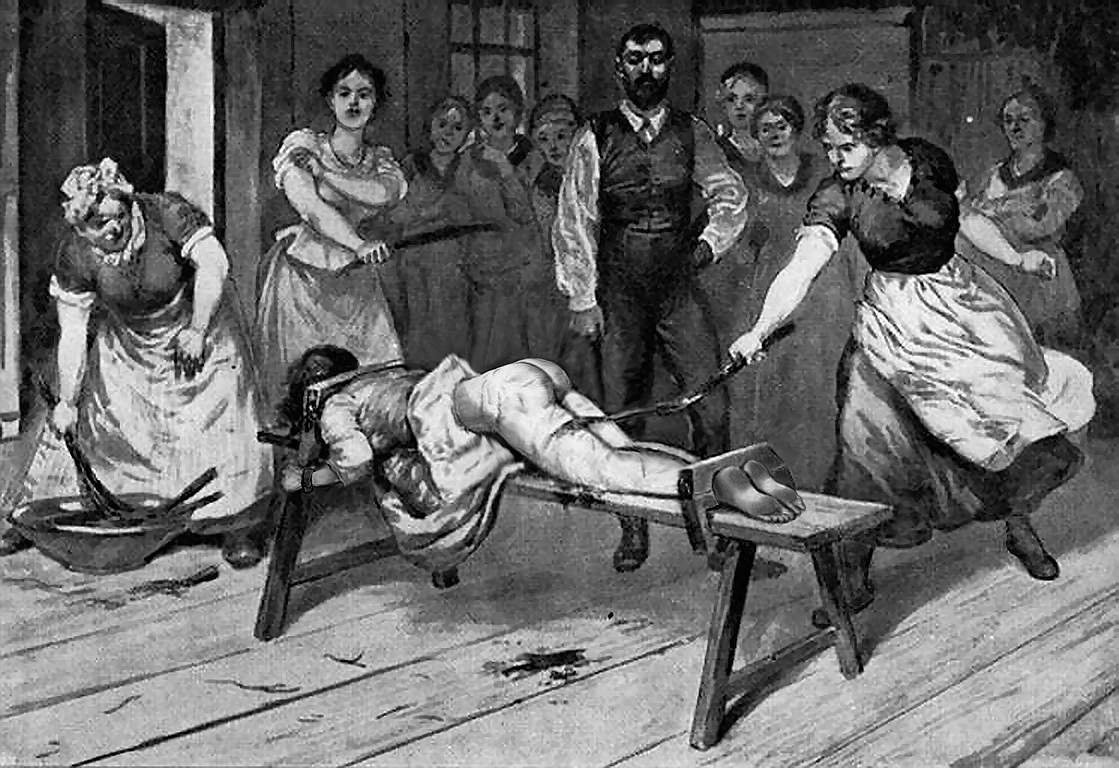
Corporal punishment in a women's prison in the United States (ca. 1890)

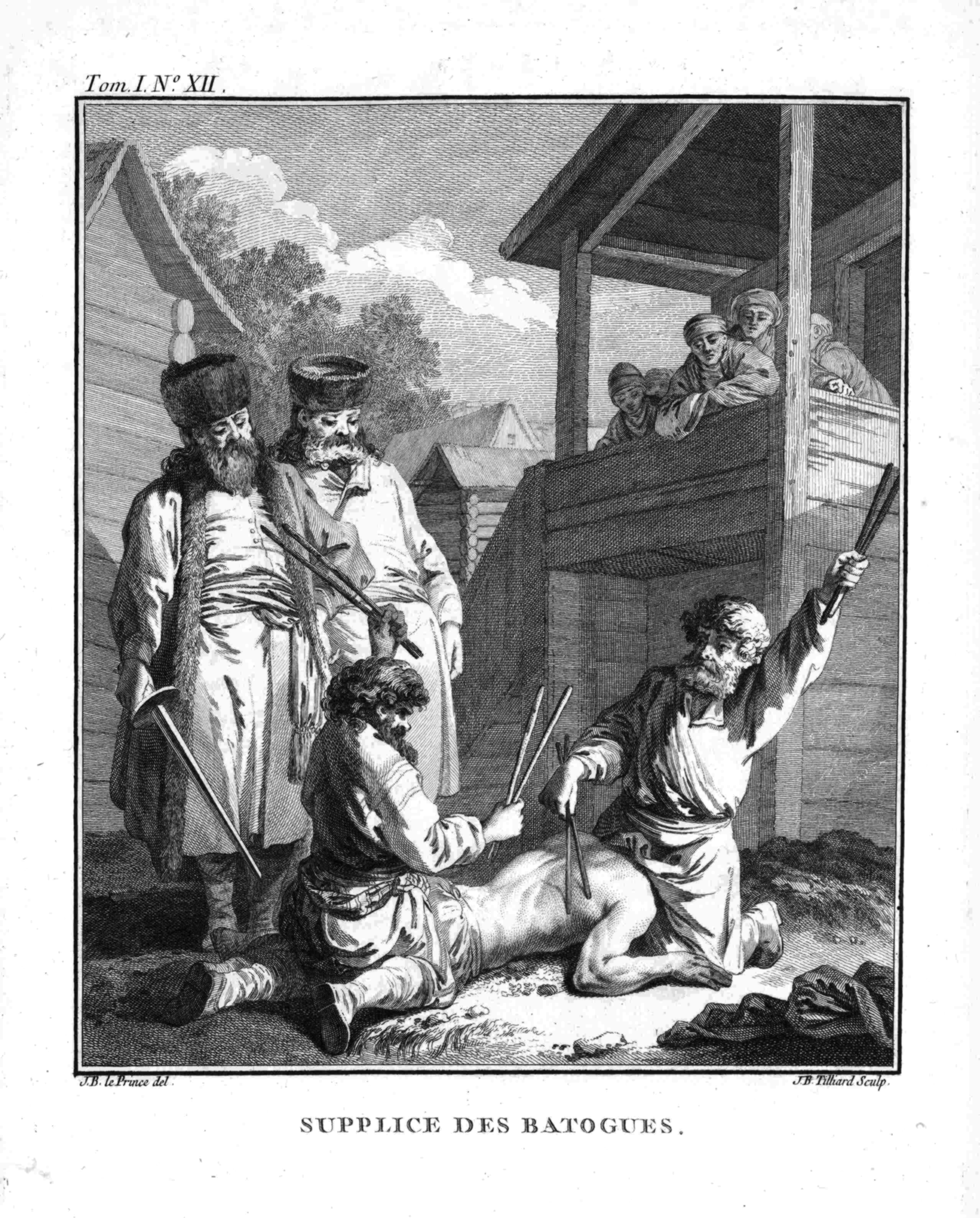
Batog, corporal punishment in the Russian Empire

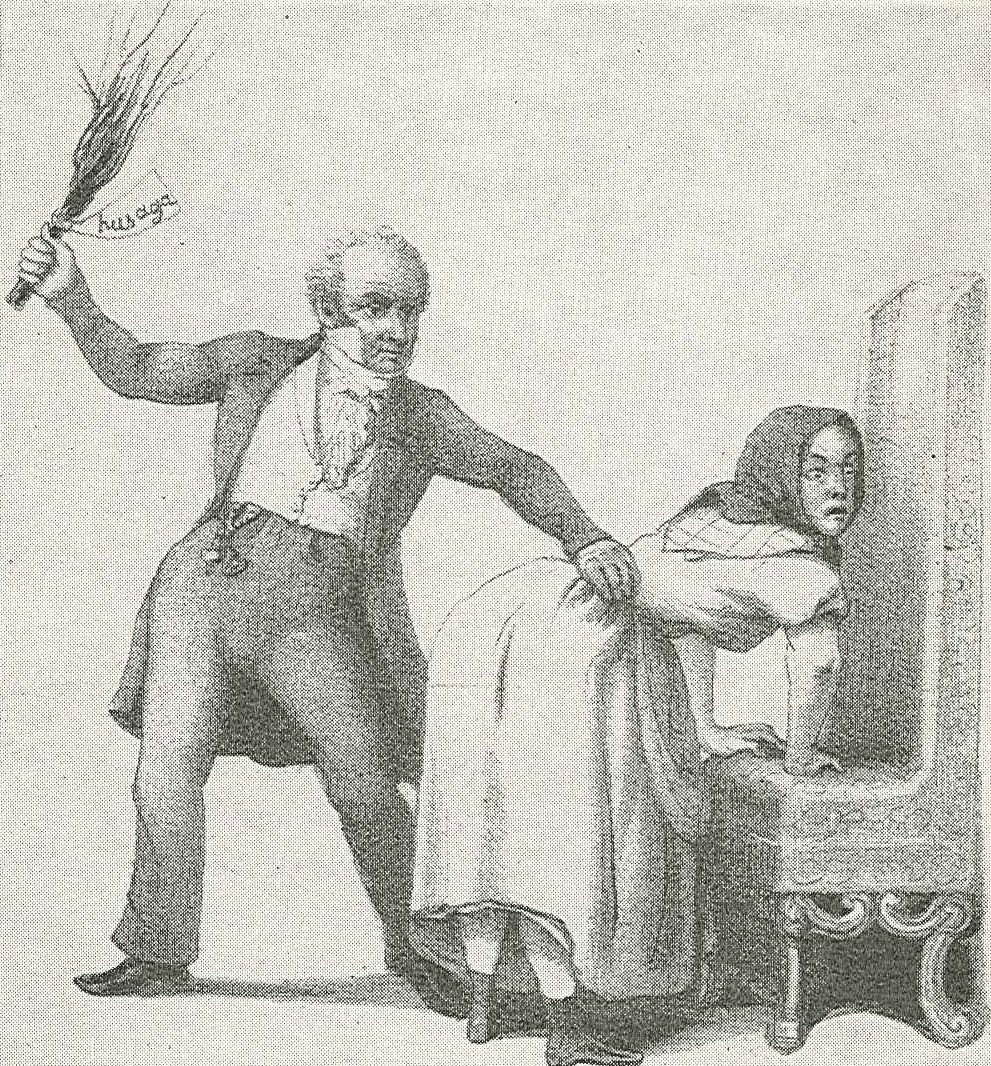
Husaga (the right of the master of the household to corporally punish his servants) was outlawed in Sweden for adults in 1858.

A consequence of this mode of thinking was a reduction in the use of corporal punishment in the 19th century in Europe and North America. In some countries, this was encouraged by scandals involving individuals seriously hurt during acts of corporal punishment. For instance, in Britain, popular opposition to punishment was encouraged by two significant cases, the death of Private Frederick John White, who died after a military flogging in 1846, and the death of Reginald Cancellor, killed by his schoolmaster in 1860. Events such as these mobilised public opinion and, by the late nineteenth century, the extent of corporal punishment's use in state schools was unpopular with many parents in England. Authorities in Britain and some other countries introduced more detailed rules for the infliction of corporal punishment in government institutions such as schools, prisons, and reformatories. By the First World War, parents' complaints about disciplinary excesses in England had died down.

In the 1870s, courts in the United States overruled the common-law principle that a husband had the right to "physically chastise an errant wife". In the UK, the traditional right of a husband to inflict moderate corporal punishment on his wife to keep her "within the bounds of duty" was similarly removed in 1891. See Domestic violence for more information.

In the United Kingdom, the use of judicial corporal punishment declined during the first half of the twentieth century and it was abolished altogether in the Criminal Justice Act, 1948 (zi & z2 GEo. 6. CH. 58.), whereby whipping and flogging were outlawed except for use in very serious internal prison discipline cases, while most other European countries had abolished it earlier. Meanwhile, in many schools, the use of the cane, paddle or tawse remained commonplace in the UK and the United States until the 1980s. In rural areas of the Southern United States, and in several other countries, it still is: see School corporal punishment.

== International treaties ==
=== Human rights ===
Key developments related to corporal punishment occurred in the late 20th century. Years with particular significance to the prohibition of corporal punishment are emphasised.

- 1950: European Convention on Human Rights, Council of Europe. Article 3 bans "inhuman or degrading treatment or punishment".
  - 1978: European Court of Human Rights, overseeing its implementation, rules that judicial birching of a juvenile breaches Article 3.
- 1985: Standard Minimum Rules for the Administration of Juvenile Justice, or Beijing Rules, United Nations (UN). Rule 17.3: "Juveniles shall not be subject to corporal punishment."
  - 1990 Supplement: Rules for the Protection of Juveniles Deprived of their Liberty. Rule 67: "...all disciplinary measures constituting cruel, inhumane or degrading treatment shall be strictly prohibited, including corporal punishment..."
- 1990: Guidelines for the Prevention of Juvenile Delinquency, the Riyadh Guidelines, UN. Paragraph 21(h): education systems should avoid "harsh disciplinary measures, particularly corporal punishment."
- 1966: International Covenant on Civil and Political Rights, UN, with currently 167 parties, 74 signatories. Article 7: "No one shall be subjected to torture or to cruel, inhuman or degrading treatment or punishment..."
  - 1992: Human Rights Committee, overseeing its implementation, comments: "the prohibition must extend to corporal punishment . . . in this regard . . . article 7 protects, in particular, children, . . .."
- 1984: Convention against Torture and Other Cruel, Inhuman or Degrading Treatment or Punishment, UN, with currently 150 parties and 78 signatories.
  - 1996: Committee Against Torture, overseeing its implementation, condemns corporal punishment.
- 1966: International Covenant on Economic, Social and Cultural Rights, UN, with currently 160 parties, and 70 signatories. Article 13(1): "education shall be directed to the full development of the human personality and the sense of its dignity..."
  - 1999: Committee on Economic, Social and Cultural Rights, overseeing its implementation, comments: "corporal punishment is inconsistent with the fundamental guiding principle of international human rights law . . . the dignity of the individual."
- 1961: European Social Charter, Council of Europe.
  - 2001: European Committee of Social Rights, overseeing its implementation, concludes: it is not "acceptable that a society which prohibits any form of physical violence between adults would accept that adults subject children to physical violence."

=== Children's rights ===
The notion of children's rights in the Western world developed in the 20th century, but the issue of corporal punishment was not generally addressed before mid-century. Years with particular significance to the prohibition of corporal punishment of children are emphasised.

- 1923: Children's Rights Proclamation by Save the Children founder. (5 articles).
  - 1924 Adopted as the World Child Welfare Charter, League of Nations (non-enforceable).
- 1959: Declaration of the Rights of the Child, (UN) (10 articles; non-binding).
- 1989: Convention on the Rights of the Child, UN (54 articles; binding treaty), with currently 193 parties and 140 signatories. Article 19.1: "States Parties shall take all appropriate legislative, administrative, social and educational measures to protect the child from all forms of physical or mental violence, injury or abuse, neglect or negligent treatment, maltreatment or exploitation . . . ."
  - 2006: Committee on the Rights of the Child, overseeing its implementation, comments: there is an "obligation of all States Party to move quickly to prohibit and eliminate all corporal punishment."
  - 2011: Optional Protocol on a Communications Procedure allowing individual children to submit complaints regarding specific violations of their rights.
- 2006: Study on Violence against Children presented by Independent Expert for the Secretary-General to the UN General Assembly.
- 2007: Post of Special Representative of the Secretary-General on violence against children established.

== Modern use ==
Laws on corporal punishment for minors Illegal altogether Legal in homes Legal in homes and private schools Legal in homes and schools (public and private) Legal in homes, schools, and judicially

School corporal punishment in the United States

Corporal punishment of minors in the United States

Corporal punishment prohibited in public schools
Corporal punishment not prohibited in public schools

Legality of corporal punishment of minors in Europe

Corporal punishment banned altogether
Corporal punishment banned in schools only
Corporal punishment not prohibited in schools or in the home

=== Legal status ===
70 countries, most of them in Europe and Latin America, have prohibited any corporal punishment of children.

The earliest recorded attempt to prohibit corporal punishment of children by a state dates back to Poland in 1783. However, its prohibition in all spheres of life – in homes, schools, the penal system and alternative care settings – occurred first in 1966 in Sweden. The 1979 Swedish Parental Code reads: "Children are entitled to care, security and a good upbringing. Children are to be treated with respect for their person and individuality and may not be subjected to corporal punishment or any other humiliating treatment."

As of 2021, corporal punishment of children by parents (or other adults) is outlawed altogether in 63 nations (including the partially recognized Republic of Kosovo) and 3 constituent nations.

Countries that have completely prohibited corporal punishment of children:
Country	Year
Sweden	1979
Finland	1983
Norway	1987
Austria	1989
Cyprus	1994
Denmark	1997
Poland	1997
Latvia	1998
Germany	1998
Croatia	1999
Bulgaria	2000
Israel	2000
Turkmenistan	2002
Iceland	2003
Ukraine	2004
Romania	2004
Hungary	2005
Greece	2006
New Zealand	2007
Netherlands	2007
Portugal	2007
Uruguay	2007
Venezuela	2007
Spain	2007
Togo	2007
Costa Rica	2008
Moldova	2008
Luxembourg	2008
Liechtenstein	2008
Tunisia	2010
Kenya	2010
Congo, Republic of	2010
Albania	2010
South Sudan	2011
North Macedonia	2013
Cabo Verde	2013
Honduras	2013
Malta	2014
Brazil	2014
Bolivia	2014
Argentina	2014
San Marino	2014
Nicaragua	2014
Estonia	2014
Andorra	2014
Benin	2015
Ireland	2015
Peru	2015
Mongolia	2016
Montenegro	2016
Paraguay	2016
Aruba	2016
Slovenia	2016
Lithuania	2017
Nepal	2018
Kosovo	2019
France	2019
South Africa	2019
Jersey	2019
Georgia	2020
Japan	2020
Seychelles	2020
Scotland	2020
Guinea	2021
Colombia	2021
South Korea	2021
Wales	2022
Zambia	2022
Cuba	2022
Mauritius	2022
Laos	2024
Tajikistan	2024
Thailand	2025
Czech Republic	2025
Switzerland	2025

For a more detailed overview of the global use and prohibition of the corporal punishment of children, see the following table.

Summary of the number of countries prohibiting corporal punishment of children
	Home	Schools	Penal system		Alternative care settings
	Home	Schools	As sentence for crime	As disciplinary measure	Alternative care settings
Prohibited	67	130	156	117	39
Not prohibited	131	68	41	77	159
Legality unknown	–	–	1	4	–

=== Corporal punishment in the home ===
An overview of the Abolition of Defence of Reasonable Punishment Act 2020, which ends the physical punishment of children everywhere in Wales, including the home

Domestic corporal punishment (i.e. the punishment of children by their parents) is often referred to colloquially as "spanking", "smacking", or "slapping".

It has been outlawed in an increasing number of countries, starting with Sweden in 1979. In some other countries, corporal punishment is legal, but restricted (e.g. blows to the head are outlawed, implements may not be used, only children within a certain age range may be spanked).

In all states of the United States and most African and Asian nations, corporal punishment by parents is legal. It is also legal to use certain implements (e.g. a belt or a paddle).

In Canada, spanking by parents or legal guardians (but nobody else) is legal, with certain restrictions: the child must be between the ages of 2–12, and no implement other than an open, bare hand may be used (belts, paddles, etc. are prohibited). It is also illegal to strike the head when disciplining a child.

In England and Northern Ireland, spanking or smacking is legal, but it must not cause an injury amounting to actual bodily harm (any injury such as visible bruising, breaking of the whole skin, etc.). In addition, in Scotland, since October 2003, it has been illegal to use any implements or to strike the head when disciplining a child, and it is also prohibited to use corporal punishment towards children under the age of 3 years. In 2019, Scotland enacted a ban on corporal punishment, which went into effect in 2020. Wales also enacted a ban in 2020, which went into effect in 2022.

In Pakistan, Section 89 of Pakistan Penal Code allows corporal punishment.

In 2024, children's doctors urged ministers to ban smacking children in England and Northern Ireland as their report warned that children suffer physically and mentally after being hit in their home. However, the UK government stated there were no plans to change the law on smacking in England and said it would observe the impact of legal amendments in Scotland and Wales.

=== Corporal punishment in schools ===
Corporal punishment in schools has been outlawed in many countries. It often involves striking the student on the buttocks or the palm of the hand with an implement (e.g. a rattan cane or a spanking paddle).

In countries where corporal punishment is still allowed in schools, there may be restrictions; for example, school caning in Singapore and Malaysia is, in theory, permitted for boys only.

In India and many other countries, corporal punishment has technically been abolished by law. However, corporal punishment continues to be practised on boys and girls in many schools around the world. Cultural perceptions of corporal punishment have rarely been studied and researched. One study carried out discusses how corporal punishment is perceived among parents and students in India.

Medical professionals have urged putting an end to the practice, noting the danger of injury to children's hands especially.

=== Judicial punishment ===
Countries with judicial corporal punishment

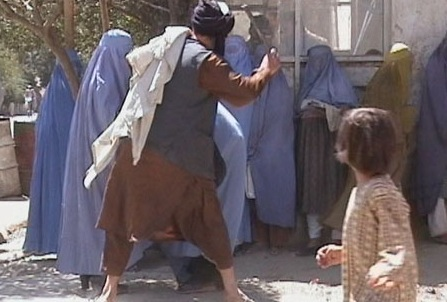
A member of the Taliban's religious police beating an Afghan woman in Kabul on 26 August 2001

Around 33 countries in the world still retain judicial corporal punishment, including a number of former British territories such as Botswana, Malaysia, Singapore and Tanzania. In Singapore, for certain specified offences, males are routinely sentenced to caning in addition to a prison term. The Singaporean practice of caning became much discussed around the world in 1994 when American teenager Michael P. Fay received four strokes of the cane for vandalism. Judicial caning and whipping are also used in Aceh Province in Indonesia.

A number of other countries with an Islamic legal system, such as Saudi Arabia, UAE, Qatar, Iran, Brunei, Sudan, and some northern states in Nigeria, employ judicial whipping for a range of offences. In April 2020, the Saudi Supreme Court ended the flogging punishment from its court system, and replaced it with jail time or fines. As of 2009, some regions of Pakistan are experiencing a breakdown of law and government, leading to a reintroduction of corporal punishment by ad hoc Islamist courts. As well as corporal punishment, some Islamic countries such as Saudi Arabia and Iran use other kinds of physical penalties such as amputation or mutilation. However, the term "corporal punishment" has since the 19th century usually meant caning, flagellation or bastinado rather than those other types of physical penalty.

In some countries, foot whipping (bastinado) is still practised on prisoners.

== Effects ==
According to a study headed by Harvard researchers, corporal punishment like spanking could affect the brain development of children. These effects are similar to the more severe form of violence. Corporal punishment is associated with physical injury and abuse, it erodes parent-child relationships, reduces cognitive abilities and IQ scores, leads to mental health problems including depression and anxiety, and it increases adult aggression and anti-social behaviors.

== Rituals ==
In parts of England, boys were once beaten under the old tradition of "Beating the Bounds" whereby a boy was paraded around the edge of a city or parish and spanked with a switch or cane to mark the boundary. One famous "Beating the Bounds" took place around the boundary of St Giles and the area where Tottenham Court Road now stands in central London. The actual stone that marked the boundary is now underneath the Centre Point office tower.

In the Czech Republic, Slovakia, and some parts of Hungary, a tradition for health and fertility is carried out on Easter Monday. Boys and young men will spank or whip girls and young women on the bottom with braided willow branches. After the man sings the verse, the young woman turns around and the man takes a few whacks at her backside with the whip.

== In popular culture ==
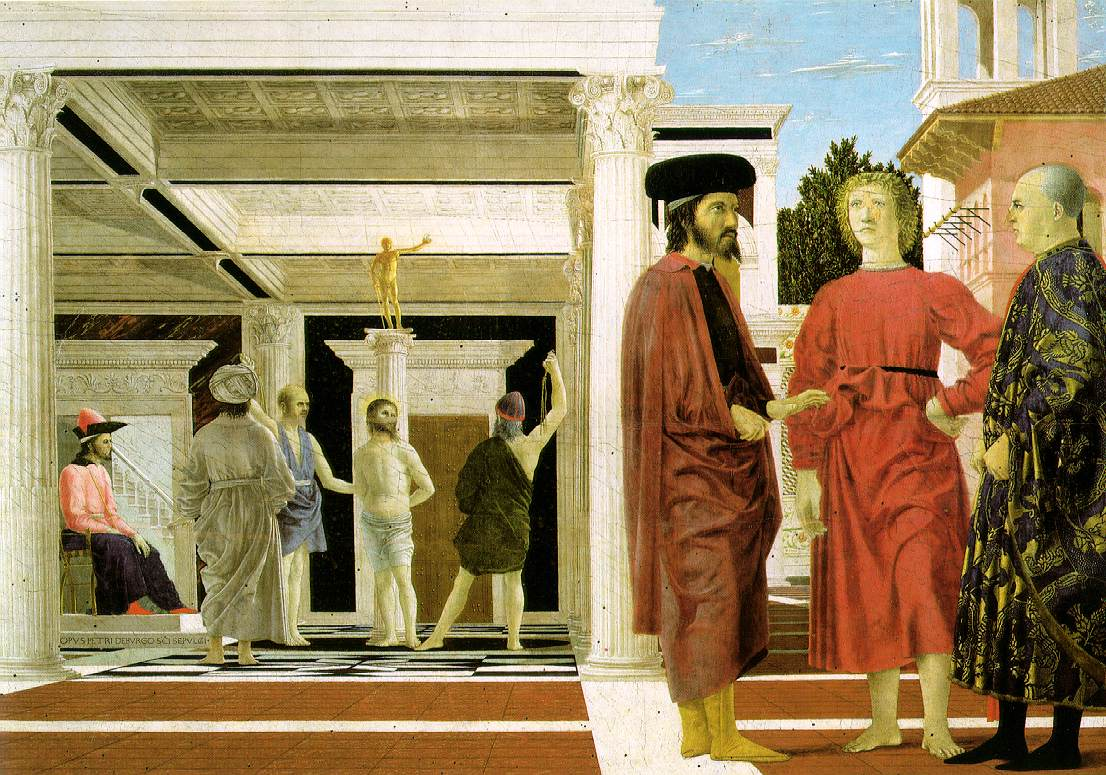
The Flagellation, by Piero della Francesca

Art

- The Flagellation, (c.1455–70), by Piero della Francesca. Christ is lashed while Pontius Pilate looks on.
- The Whipping, (1941), by Horace Pippin. A figure tied to a whipping post is flogged.

== See also ==
- Child discipline
- Disfigurement
- Hotsaucing
- Physical abuse
- School violence
- Tough love
- Virge
- Campaigns against corporal punishment
- Washing out the mouth with soap
