= Brook of Egypt =

Biblical watercourse

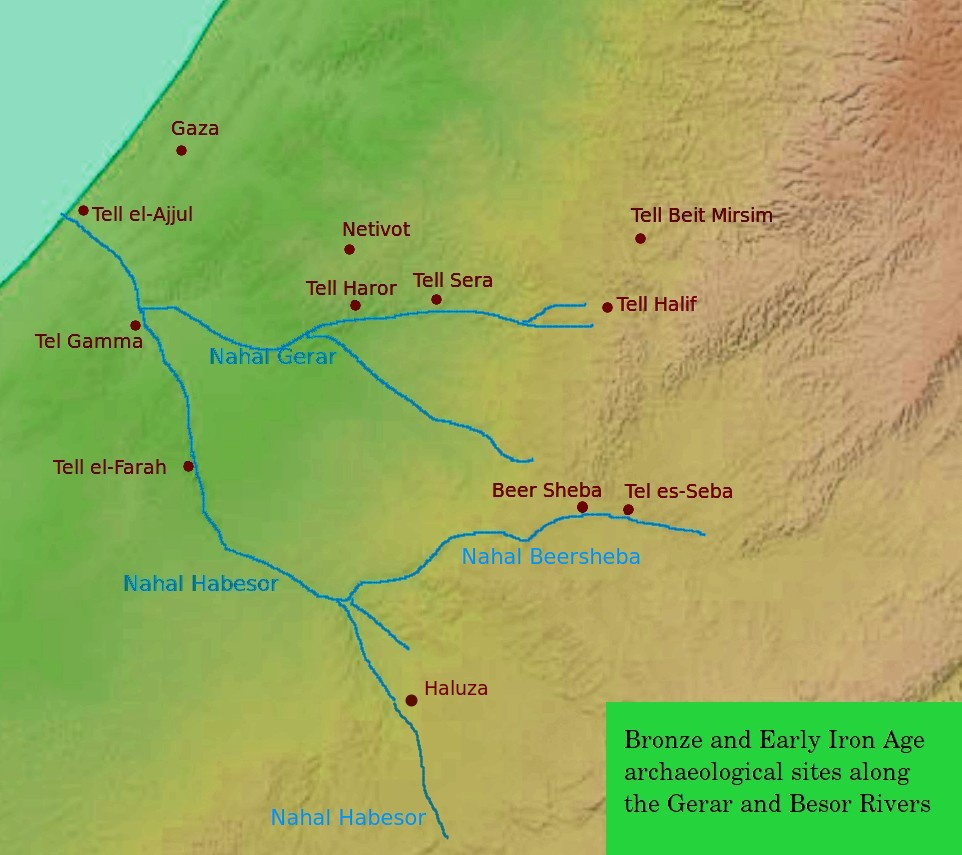
The Besor stream (Nahal HaBesor) and nearby streams, with the Bronze and Early Iron Age sites and modern towns of the area.

The Brook of Egypt (Hebrew: נַחַל מִצְרַיִם, romanized: naḥal mitzrayim, lit. 'wadi of Egypt') is a wadi identified in the Hebrew Bible as forming the southernmost border of the Land of Israel. A number of scholars have identified it with Wadi al-Arish, an ephemeral river flowing into the Mediterranean sea near the Egyptian city of Arish, while Israeli archaeologist Nadav Na'aman believes that the landform referenced in the Bible is the Besor Stream, just to the south of Gaza. Finally, another traditional Jewish interpretation is that the term refers to the Nile – a view that appears in ancient translations of the Jewish Bible, as preserved in the Neophiti and Vatican manuscripts.

A related phrase is nahar mitzrayim ('river of Egypt'), used in Genesis 15:18.

== Wadi al-Arish ==
According to Exodus 13:18–20, the locality from which the Israelites journeyed after departing Egypt was Sukkot. The name Sukkot means "palm huts" in Hebrew and was translated Al-Arish in Arabic. It lies in the vicinity of Arish, the hometown of the Jewish commentator Saadia Gaon who identified Naḥal Mizraim with the Wadi al-Arish. Ishtori Haparchi, in his 14th-century work Kaftor va-Ferach (Hebrew: כפתור ופרח), also identifies the Brook of Egypt as Wadi al-Arish.

The Septuagint translates Naḥal Mizraim in Isaiah 27:12 as Rhinocorura.

Although in later Hebrew the term naḥal tended to be used for small rivers, in Biblical Hebrew, the word could be used for any wadi or river valley.

According to Sara Japhet, "Nahal Mizraim" is Wadi al-Arish, which empties into the Mediterranean Sea about 30 miles south of Raphia, and "Shihor Mizraim" is the Nile.

== Nahal Besor ==
The Israeli archaeologist Nadav Na'aman has suggested in papers published in 1979 and 1995 that Wadi Gaza, or Nahal Besor, is the Brook of Egypt. Certainly, it was controlled by Egypt in the Late Bronze Age and inhabited by Philistines into the Iron Age. In the 1995 paper Na'aman cites evidence that "the area of Nahal Besor experienced an unprecedented demographic boom in the seventh century, whereas the area near Wadi el-'Arish was sparsely inhabited at that time", which he believes lends circumstantial support to his hypothesis.

== The Nile tradition ==
One traditional Jewish understanding of the term Naḥal Mizraim is that it refers to the Nile. This view appears in the Palestinian Targum of Numbers 34:5, where נחלה מצרים is translated נילוס דמצריי ("the Nile of the Egyptians") — as preserved in the Neophiti and Vatican manuscripts, as well as in Pseudo-Jonathan. It also appears in medieval commentaries by Rashi and David Kimhi on Joshua 13:3. However, most historical commentators, such as Abraham Ibn Ezra, Bahya ben Asher, Samuel David Luzzatto, Naftali Zvi Yehuda Berlin, Moisè Tedeschi on Numbers 34:5, and the translators of the Targum Onkelos reject this interpretation, as do modern scholars.
