= Nose prosthesis =

Craniofacial prosthesis for someone who no longer has their original nose

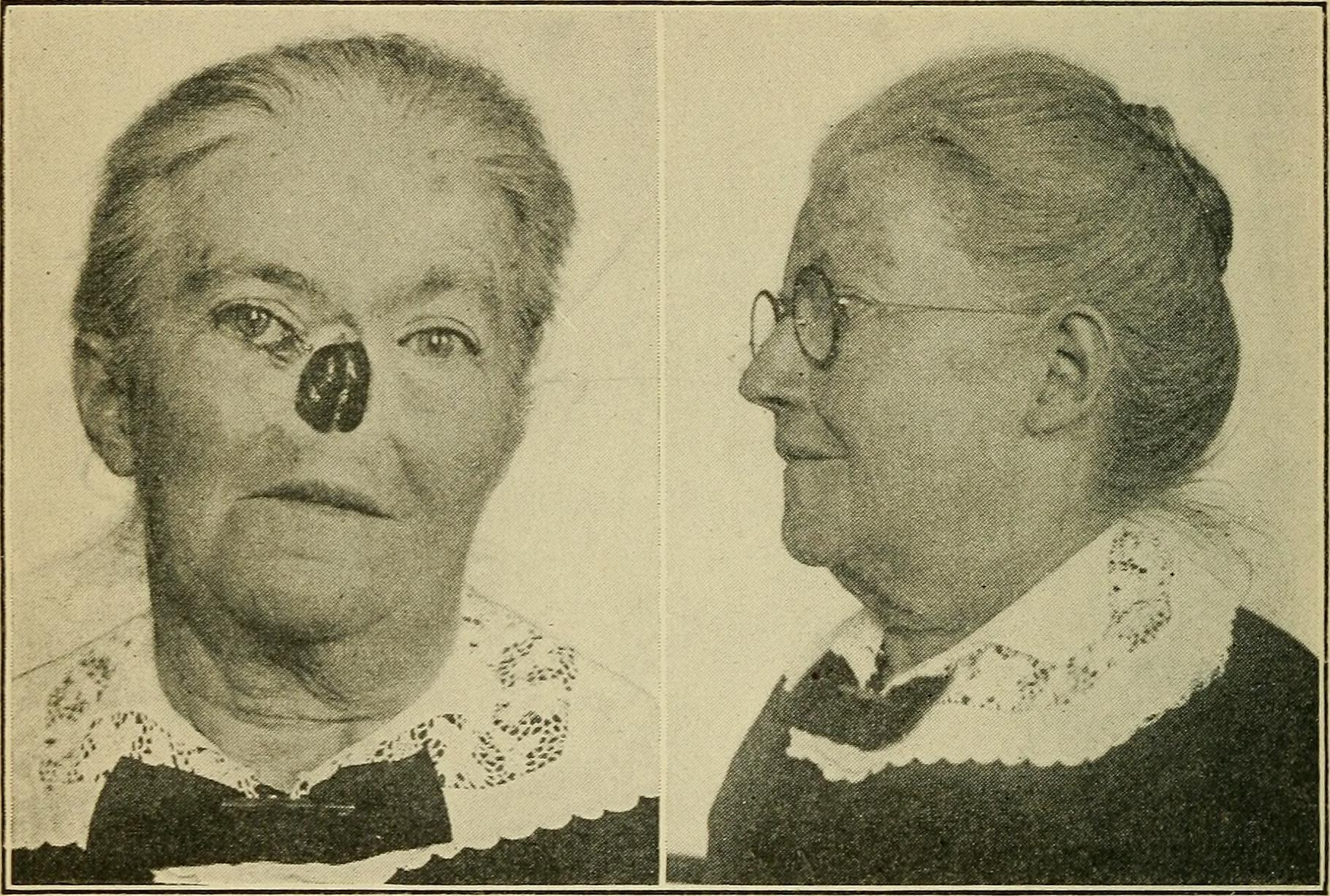
Nose prosthesis, ca. 1918

A nose prosthesis is a craniofacial prosthesis for someone who no longer has their original nose. Nose prostheses are designed by anaplastologists who have their patients referred to them by ear, nose, and throat doctors and plastic surgeons.

Unlike the more common nasal operation called a rhinoplasty, which is the reconstruction of the nose using existing tissue, a prosthetic nose implantation requires the nose to be made completely from synthetic material. Prior to getting a nose prosthesis implanted, any original nose structure is removed via a rhinectomy in order to accommodate the prosthesis. One of the biggest challenges for anaplastologists in constructing a nose prosthesis is finding the right material to use for the nose, as it's a complex organ with several distinct functions and a unique structure. The major functions of the nose include the sense of smell (olfaction), filtered breathing, and alteration of speech. All of these tasks can be completed due to the nose’s network of bones, cartilage, and muscle, which also helps to keep the nose stable on the face. Although there are currently usable prosthetic noses, they only have temporary functionality. Advancements in areas such as 3D-printing have medical professionals hoping to create noses that are as efficient as the real ones.

== Reasons for nose removal ==
A nose prosthesis is only required if the nose cannot be repaired, and there are a variety of reasons this may occur.

- A benign tumor or a malignant neoplasm forms within the nasal cavity. Threatening or not, it's too dangerous to leave cancerous tissue in the body, and the safest thing to do is to completely remove it.
- An infection eats away part or even all of the nose causing instability and loss of function. Fungal sinusitis is one example of a disease that can destroy the nose.
- A person is displeased with the way their nose looks. Instead of the traditional plastic surgery to realign it, they decide to get an entirely new nose.
- A severe event, such as burns or significant blunt force, results in trauma to the nose, disfiguring it to the point where getting a prosthetic one is necessary.
- A congenital anomaly causes DNA for the formation of the nose to be damaged. Also, something can go wrong during development with the nose inside the womb, even if the DNA is correct.

== Fabrication ==
Developing a nose prosthesis requires a balance of artistic and technological skills.

=== Materials ===
This required craftsmanship can be seen in the material used for nose prostheses, as it must support the functionality of the nose while staying cosmetically appealing to the patient. There are several different materials presently used for prosthetic noses:

- Acrylic resins derived from ethylene are one of the most popular choices for constructing a nose prosthesis. While acrylic resins don't age quickly due to not degrading in UV light and good stability, they have high water sorption and are similar to plastic causing them to be rigid.
- Polyvinyl chloride co-polymers are made up of a mixture of plasticizer (substance which increases stiffness) and polyvinyl chloride. The benefits of polyvinyl chloride co-polymers include accessibility to extrinsic/intrinsic coloration and high flexibility, but they aren't very durable and break down in UV light.
- Polyurethane elastomers are constructed via polymers with isocyanates and polymers with hydroxyl groups; these compounds have different properties based on the number of isocyanates present. Polyurethane elastomers give the best appearance of any substance due to its ability to be very elastic while not compromising strength. However, they aren't easily compatible with current attachment mechanisms.
- Silicone elastomers are composed of RTV (room temperature vulcanization) silicone. Silicone is unique because it stays operational at many temperatures and can be used in many different ways due to its diverse forms, resulting in silicone being the most promising material for the future as researchers continue to develop new variations of it.

=== Design ===
Since patients must wait several months before they are given a permanent nose prosthesis, a temporary one is usually afforded to them after 3 to 4 weeks so that they can return to normal social activity. The critical parts in making sure the fabrication of a nose prosthesis are impression, sculpting, and painting. The process of creating a prosthetic nose differs based on each individual case, but most of them follow a general pattern of steps:

1. With the patient seated in a slightly upward position, the patient's face is draped with a cloth and stuffed with moist gauze to ensure that no excess material gets into the wrong areas.
2. Polyvinyl siloxane, a liquid that can quickly solidify, is used to make an impression of the desired area and gets examined so that the impression matches the defective spot.
3. Impression is transformed into a cast using type III dental stone (a substance similar to plastic).
4. Newly formed cast is then used to make a wax model. The anaplastologist will begin to work on cosmetic factors of the prosthetic nose based on the patient's appearance.
5. As wax model is continuously perfected, the patient is inspected in more detail to match the texture of his/her skin and other facial qualities.
6. Small amount of acrylic-based paint is added to start the intrinsic coloration (color in the core).
7. Wax model is dewaxed in a flask, and desired material for the nose prosthesis is processed.
8. Final layer of paint is added on the outside for extrinsic coloration (outer color) to match the skin-tone, and mono-poly, which aids with water resistance, is applied on top.

Originally, wax models were hand-crafted with hours of labor required to get it all correct, but the use of CAD/CAM (computer-aided design/manufacturing) has made the process cheaper, faster, and better in overall quality of the final product.

== Method of attachment ==
The major problem scientists face with generating attachment methods is finding an efficient way to combine live tissue with synthetic material:

- Titanium implants, drilled into facial bones, enable the prosthetic nose to be magnetized allowing for easy attachment and removal.
- Osseointegration is similar to the process of using magnets, except the nose prosthesis is attached directly to the face instead of through magnetic forces.
- Eyeglass frames can be worn with the artificial nose attached underneath. However, if the patient's face is too flat, the glasses have potential to slide down from gravity.
- Adhesive substances, such as glues, bind the prosthetic nose to the face, but they aren't used as much anymore since they irritate the skin and damage the prosthesis when it is removed.

Just as none of the materials are ideal in making the best prosthetic nose, all of the attachment methods have their own flaws.

== Future technologies ==
=== Electronic nose ===
Although artificial noses with the ability to "smell" are currently available, they're only for industrial use, mainly in the food, beverage, and cosmetic industry. To make this technology compatible with humans, not only would the technology have to be incorporated into the complex prosthetic nose, but it also has to be adapted to send signals to the brain. The mechanism used for processing smell, known as the electronic nose, is copied from the brain's approach for smell. The electronic nose is broken down into 3 main units: the array of chemically broad-band sensors, the conversion of one type of signal into another, and the classification of the odor. Each sensor on the array is set to flare only when a specific molecule is present, so a certain smell will cause multiple different sensors to fire together, making the smell distinguishable. The odorant causes the sensors to create a chemical signal which is initially converted into an electrical signal before it is finally transformed into a digital signal. This digital data is then interpreted by a microprocessor, which acts as the brain, to give an output for the encountered smell. The real challenge remains to be solved as the brain is much more intricate than a computer, and medical professionals need to find a way to get the brain to respond to a synthetic part.

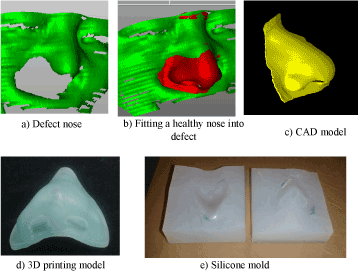

=== 3D-printing ===
Although prostheses right now use synthetic material, bioengineered tissue created from 3D-printing is improving. Manufactured cells can be used to create real versions of organs, which may allow for a full recovery of function. Every organ has a distinct set of cells, so extensive research still needs to be completed to accommodate for the requirements of each body part. The nose is one of the more challenging organs to produce due to its complexity in function and design. If bioengineering techniques can be perfected, the outcome would have huge benefits as donors would no longer be needed and patients could return to how their lives were before losing their original nose. Bioengineered tissue is currently available for limited use, but it hasn't yet been authorized for use in human transplants.

== See also ==
- Culture of cosmetic surgery
- Facial prosthetic
- Plastic Surgery
- Organ donor
- Aesthetics
