= Batog =

Russian torture device

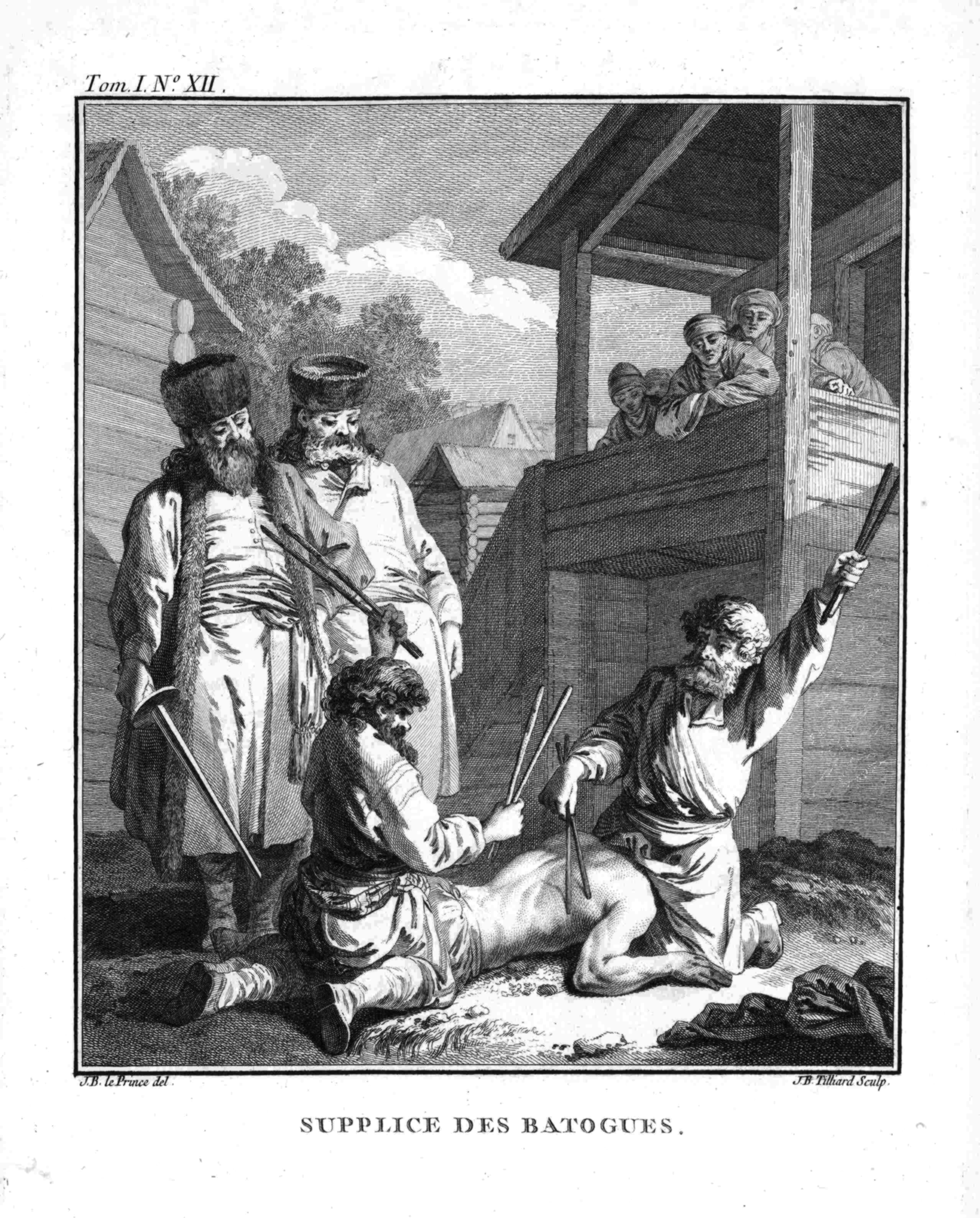
Batog, corporal punishment in Russian Empire

A batog is a rod or stick about the thickness of a man's finger traditionally used for corporal punishment in Russia. The condemned was stretched on the floor face down with his back exposed while two men sat on him, one holding down the arms the other on the legs. The two men would then begin beating the victim across the back, replacing their batogs if they broke, until ordered to stop. The punishment was not usually fatal. Peter the Great used this form of punishment, along with much harsher measures such as the breaking wheel, during the Streltsy Uprising in 1698.

== See also ==
- Caning
- Knout
