= Aryamani =

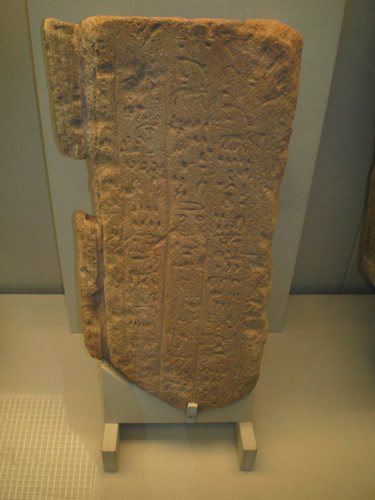
- Stela of Aryamani from Kawa (British Museum) no. 1777

Kushite King of Meroë
- Reign: c. 3rd century BC
- Predecessor: Aktisanes
- Successor: Kash(...)amani
Royal titulary
Horus name
Kanakht Meryre ("Mighty Bull, beloved of Re")
Prenomen
Usermaatre Setepenre ("Re is one whose equity is mighty, chosen one of Re")
Nomen
Son of Amun Aryamani (Sa-en-Amun Iry-Amun) with epithet Meryamun ("Beloved of Amun")

G39 N5	i mn N36 i A2 rw i i
- Burial: Barkal 11 or 14

Aryamani was a Nubian king.

== Monuments and inscriptions ==
He is attested by one stela found at Kawa. The stela provides a text in poor Egyptian language and is, therefore, for the most part, not fully understandable. However, it provides a Year 9 date from his reign. At Kawa, a second stela was also found dated to Year 24 of a king whose name is destroyed. On stylistical grounds, it has been assumed that this stela also belongs to Aryamani who, therefore, must have reigned in Nubia for at least 23 years.

The main stela, now in Copenhagen, shows the king at the top in front of Amun-Re, Mut and Khons. In the lower part there is the text, partly destroyed and therefore increasing the problems of understanding the poor Egyptian. The text starts with the year 3 and the partly lost titulary of the king. It follows a prayer to Amun-Re and in the remaining lines donations of the king to the god seems to be listed. They are arranged in an annal style, year 8 and year 9 of the king are also preserved. Furthermore, there appears a year 21 but it remains doubtful whether it relates to Aryamani. The two fragments of the second stela relate to similar donations between year 9 and 23 of an unknown king. A year 24 can be reconstructed but its meaning or context is now lost. The text might be the follow-up of the first stela.

== Date of reign ==
The position and dating of the king is highly problematic. The style of Aryamani's stela, his throne and Horus names show Ramesside influences. Therefore, he was placed at the beginning of the third century BC when there were also Ramesside influences visible in Ptolemaic Egypt and when Nubian kings, such as Aktisanes also copied Ramesside patterns. The poor Egyptian language seems to place him around or after Nastasen. Laszlo Török maintains that

"the Ramessid-style names and the monuments of Aryamani and some other [Nubian] rulers with similar names (Aktisanes, Irike-Piye-qo, Sabrakamani) are to be dated to the end of the 4th and the first half of the 3rd century BC."

Other researchers, such as Robert Morkot regard the Ramesside style as an indication that the king ruled shortly after the Ramesside period. Morkot identifies him with Alara.

== Burial ==
Aryamani is thought to have been buried at Jebel Barkal. Pyramid 11 or 14 may belong to this king.

== Literature ==
- Laszlo Török, in: Fontes Historiae Nubiorum, Vol. II, Bergen 1996, 521-532, ISBN 82-91626-01-4
