= Rhinocorura =

Rhinocorura (Ancient Greek: Ῥινοκόρουρα, romanized: Rhinokóroura, or Ῥινοκούρουρα, Rhinokoúroura) or Rhinocolura (Ῥινοκόλουρα, Rhinokóloura) was the name of a region and one or more associated towns and rivers lying between Ancient Egypt and Palestine. The name may refer explicitly to:

- As Rhinocorura, a desert location on the border between Ancient Egypt and Palestine mentioned by Strabo (Geographia XVI, 2, 31-32) and Diodorus Siculus (Historic Library Vol 1, Chap. 60). This appears to be the original usage of the name, which means "cut-off noses" in Greek. Diodorus relates that it was founded by the Ethiopian king Actisanes as a place of exile for those found guilty of robbery whom he punished by cutting off their noses. Strabo's version of the story claims that it was settled by Ethiopians who had attempted to invade Egypt and were subsequently punished by having their noses cut off. It may be identical with the Egyptian border fortress Tjaru, to which officials, who had committed crimes, were banished after having their noses cut off.
- As Rhinocorura, the Brook of Egypt, when identified as the Pelusian branch of the Nile. In ancient times, the Pelusian was the easternmost branch of the Nile, which subsequently ran dry. It was located roughly where the present Suez Canal lies. This usage of the term is found in the Septuagint translation of Isaiah 27:12. Presumably the locality mentioned by Strabo and Diodorus lay in its vicinity and gave its name to the river.
- As Rhinocolura, the name of one or two (depending on interpretation) coastal towns mentioned by Pliny and Josephus. Pliny writes, ambiguously, "and the two towns of Rhinocolura, inland Raphia, Gaza and inland Anthedon". (Pliny, Historia Naturalis, V,14.) Josephus mentions a coastal Rhinocolura near Gaza, Anthedon and Raphia. (Josephus, Antiquities of the Jews, Book 13, 15:4; Book 24, 11:5). He also mentions Rhinocolura in connection with Pelusium (Antiquities of the Jews, Book 14, 14:2; The Jewish War, Book 1, 14). The coastal Rhinocolura (or one of them, if there were two) is commonly identified with El-Arish. It is uncertain if this is identical to the Rhinocorura of Strabo and Diodorus. Archaeologists have found no evidence of occupation prior to the Hellenistic period at El-Arish.
- As Rhinocolura or Rhinocorura, the Wadi al-Arish. The drying up and disappearance of the Pelusian arm of the Nile led Biblical commentators to identify the Rhinocurara of the Septuagint (the "Brook of Egypt") with the Wadi El-Arish, which provides water to El-Arish identified with the coastal Rhinocolura of Pliny and Josephus.
- Rhinocolura or Rhinocorura (Latin: Rhinocoruritanus), a Catholic titular see and suffragan diocese of Pelusium, representing the Sinai
