= Aktisanes =

Kushite King of Meroë
- Reign: c. 3rd century BC
- Predecessor: Nastasen
- Successor: Aryamani
Royal titulary
Horus name
Kanakht Merymaat ("Mighty Bull who loves Equity")
Nebty name
Wer-menu-em-per-itef-Amen-en-nepet ("Whose monuments are great in the house of his father Amun in Napata")
Golden Horus
Ir-sankhy-rekhyu ("Who vivifies the rekhit people")
Prenomen
Menmaatre Setepenamun ("Re is one whose equity endures, chosen one of Amun")
Nomen
Aktisanes

| G39 N5 | g A ti i z n |
- Consort: Alakhebasken
- Burial: Barkal 11 or 14

Aktisanes is a Nubian king who is mentioned by the Greek historian Hecataeus of Abdera. He is perhaps identical with Menmaatre-Setepenamun Gatisen known from Nubian sources.

== Titles ==
Gatisen had a Ramesside-style titulary. His Horus name Kanakht-merymaat is the same as the Horus name of Ramesses II (and Osorkon II and Shoshenq III). This is a second reason why he is placed by some scholars around 300 BC.

It had been assumed that in the fourth century BC, there was a Ramesside revival in Nubia. Other researchers have pointed out that the reading of the name Gatisen is uncertain. They place the king before 700 BC and assume that there was no Ramesside revival.

== Monuments and inscriptions ==
His longest text is a now lost building inscription copied by the Lepsius expedition in Nuri, but only published in 1977. The text was only partly preserved. It once most likely adorned a door at a temple in Napata. The names of the king are not preserved, most importantly the nomen Gatisen is missing. The other inscription is to be found on two adjoining blocks, showing the king in front of Amun-Re-Horachte-Atum. The blocks were found at the Jebel Barkal. In this inscription the throne name and the nomen of the king are preserved, but the nomen Gatisen is difficult to read. The same holds true for a doorjamb from the same place providing the full titulary of the king, but with the nomen only partly preserved.

The name Gatisen has been identified with Aktisanes, known from the Greek historian Hecataeus of Abdera. This identification is not certain, especially because the reading of the name as Gatisen is uncertain. Hecataeus describes Aktisanes as an enemy of the Egyptian king Amasis. This seems unlikely as the earlier Nubian kings are well-known. Therefore and for other reasons it is in general assumed that Hecataeus chose the name of a contemporary Nubian king as he composed his more fictional story.

== Burial ==
Aktisanes was buried at Jebel Barkal. He is thought to have been buried in either pyramid 11 or pyramid 14.

== See also ==
- Actisanes
- List of monarchs of Kush

== Literature ==
- Laszlo Török, in: Fontes Historiae Nubiorum, Vol. II, Bergen 1996, 511-520, ISBN 82-91626-01-4
