= Culture of cosmetic surgery =

Differing attitudes towards cosmetic surgery

Culture of cosmetic surgery is a set of attitudes and behaviors regarding making changes to one's appearance via plastic surgery and its impact on various communities. This type of surgery became more prevalent after World War I, led by the efforts of Harold Gillies of New Zealand, who developed methods to restore structure and function to the faces of soldiers. As beauty standards and emphasis on personal appearance evolved, new products and techniques were developed to meet those demands. In more recent years, cosmetic plastic surgery prevalence has surged worldwide due to a variety of social and psychological factors.

== Origins of plastic surgery ==
World War I left thousands of soldiers with unprecedented levels of facial damage due to new trench warfare tactics and progressive weapons. This created an increased demand for medical intervention. Dr. Harold Gillies of New Zealand developed and tested methods to restore function and structure to the faces of soldiers, such as taking cartilage or skin from an easily concealed part of the patient's body and using it to reform the injured area, which is now referred to as a skin graft. He has been renowned as the "Father of Plastic Surgery," due to his contributions to the field with techniques advancing facial reconstruction surgery. Dr. Varaztad Kazanjian was also recognized by Harvard Medical School for his efforts in reconstructive plastic surgery during and after the war. Years after the war ended, the supply of patients in need of life-saving facial reconstruction reduced, but the techniques and procedures developed during the war continued to grow and became increasingly prevalent. Specifically, techniques used by Dr. Gilles are credited for use in the development of cosmetic plastic surgery.

== Social factors ==
Many social factors contribute to cosmetic plastic surgery's global increase in popularity and use. Social media has had an immense impact on the culture of cosmetic plastic surgery. Platforms such as Snapchat and Instagram have been found to encourage cosmetic plastic surgery procedures by constantly reinforcing social norms revolving around appearance and beauty standards. The nature of these apps involve numbers of likes, followers, reposts, etc. In the age of social media, people are driven to alter their cosmetic appearance in efforts to conform to social norms presented on various platforms and to achieve validation. This idea is reinforced by celebrity endorsement of cosmetic plastic surgery, and followers who "idolize," their appearances. Additionally, social media allows plastic surgeons to create widespread advertisements for procedures, allowing them to gain popularity. Data has also shown that people are more likely obtain cosmetic procedures if they are surrounded by someone who has had plastic surgery or were bullied in their youth as well. Other social factors such as number of sexual partners, marriage, pregnancy, and quality of relationships have been shown in positive correlation with cosmetic plastic surgery.

== Psychology and cosmetic plastic surgery ==
There exists a correlation between psychological mental illnesses and cosmetic plastic surgery. Many mental health professionals are in agreement that cosmetic plastic surgeons should conduct some sort of mental health screening in the initial consultation phase before surgery to reduce negative health effects. Most data regarding psychology and cosmetic plastic surgery focus on Body Dysmorphic Disorder (BDD), which can be defined as constant dwelling on perceived physical imperfections. While data shows varying degrees of correlation, there is extensive discussion about how BDD impacts the results of cosmetic plastic surgery for the physician and the patient. Studies have found that patients with BDD are more likely to obtain legal counsel after surgery and have dissatisfaction regarding their results. It has also been shown that cosmetic plastic surgery can lead to further fixation for BDD patients. Other mental health disorders, such as depression, anxiety, varying eating and personality disorders have also been correlated with cosmetic plastic surgery. These illnesses present themselves within various literature reviews and meta analyses in their prevalence within cosmetic surgery patients. Plastic surgery can additionally be correlated to positive trends regarding mental health. Some data shows that patients receiving cosmetic surgery had increased quality of life and sexual intercourse. Another aspect of plastic surgery involves reconstructive plastic surgery, consistent with the origins mentioned regarding WWI. This involves procedures such as breast reconstruction, tissue allotransplantation, and treatment of burn victims. While these procedures are mentally taxing and contain a lengthy healing process, the results have been found to increase self confidence and satisfaction.

== Contemporary trends ==
After WWI, facial reconstruction surgery became increasingly prevalent due to the quantity of facial deformities caused by the war and led to the creation and use of Plastic Surgery as seen today. In the second half of the 20th century, cosmetic plastic surgery became increasingly popular with the development of silicone breast implants, liposuction, botox, cosmetic fillers, and CO2 laser resurfacing. Cosmetic plastic surgery and aesthetics has become more prevalent worldwide, surgically and non-surgically, between 2010 and 2023. Specifically, between 2020 and 2024, there was a 40% increase in prevalence of these procedures. While cosmetic surgery trends have changed over the last decade, liposuction has remained the most popular procedure since 2010. A stable 14 year trend has dictated the most popular cosmetic surgical and non-surgical cosmetic procedures last calculated in 2024. Of the cosmetic surgical procedures available, the most commonly done are liposuction, breast augmentations, eyelid surgeries, abdominoplasty and rhinoplasty. Of the cosmetic non-surgical options, the most prevalent include botox, filler, hair removal, and chemical peels.

== Health disparities and cosmetic plastic surgery ==
Health disparities can be defined as preventable health outcome differences in socially disadvantaged populations. These differences are measured by early onset of disease, excess or early death from a specific health issue, life-expectancy, quality of life, physical, cognitive, or socio-emotional symptoms, amount of preventable complications, amount of unfavorable health outcomes, and access to various health care resources. The populations typically considered to be socially disadvantaged are of low socioeconomic status, a specific racial or ethnic minority, or of a rural location. Health disparities are prevalent within the field of cosmetic plastic surgery, as seen specifically by racial disparities present in health outcomes. A variety of studies have shown that in comparison to white patients, non-white patients had a higher rate of adverse complications from plastic surgery. A more significant difference in health outcomes has been found between African American and white patients. Via a meta-analysis focusing on postoperative complications and patient satisfaction, the difference is relevant to the discussion of health disparities from a racial and socioeconomic perspective. The difference in health outcomes were additionally attributed to ability to speak English and ability of healthcare staff to adhere and adapt to different culture's beliefs and practices. Other populations most affected by the health disparities present within this field include women, other racial and ethnic groups, and people of low socioeconomic status.
