= Wadi al-Arish =

Egyptian riverbed in the Sinai Peninsula

Coordinates: 31.1462°N 33.8059°E

Wadi al-Arish is a dry riverbed in the Sinai Peninsula of Egypt. The river, when it flowed, was 250 kilometers long and flowed into the Mediterranean Sea near the town of Arish. Wadi al-Arish is considered by some, including geographer Ishtori Haparchi, to be the Brook of Egypt mentioned in the Hebrew Bible that formed the southernmost border of the Land of Israel.

The Wadi al-Arish catchment is the largest drainage system in the Sinai Peninsula. The African Humid Period was the last time a river consistently flowed through the riverbed.

The Wadi al-Arish was an important site in the 1916 WWI Battle of Magdhaba.
