= Moisè Tedeschi =

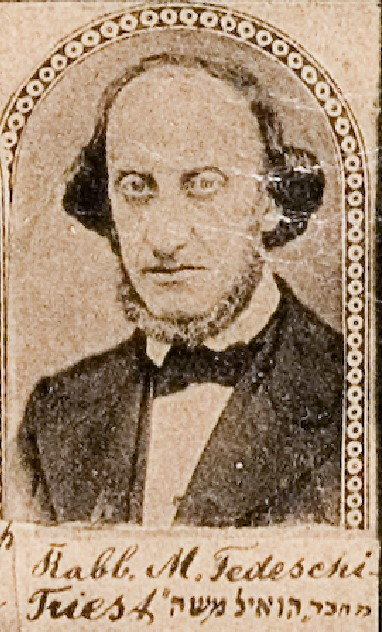
- Born: 6 June 1821
- Died: 17 June 1898 (aged 77)

Moisè Tedeschi (Hebrew form: Moshe Yitzhak Ashkenazi Hebrew: משה יצחק אשכנזי) was an Italian rabbi and Bible commentator. He is primarily known for writing the commentary Hoil Moshe.

== Biography ==
Tedeschi was born on June 6, 1821, and died June 17, 1898. He lived nearly all his life in Trieste, Italy. At age 10 his father died, and the family was reduced to "limited but quiet" circumstances. His teachers included Shemuel Chayyim Zalman and Samuel David Luzzatto.

As an adult, he worked as a teacher in the local Jewish schools and later for individuals. For a brief period in 1861, he served as a rabbi of Spoleto. His autobiography, published in Simchat HaRegel, was written at age 63.

== Works ==
Tedeschi is best known for Hoil Moshe, a commentary on all 24 books of Tanach.

He also wrote two books of Jewish thought: Mussar Melachim (a mussar work) and Simchat Haregel (a series of sermons on the holidays, along with ideas on the Targum of Mishlei, and his autobiography.)
