= Rhinectomy =

Surgical removal of a nose

- ICD-9-CM: 21.3-21.4

A rhinectomy is the surgical removal of a nose. If only part of the nose is removed it is called a partial rhinectomy, while entire nose removal is called a total rhinectomy. Often, a nose prosthesis is required for rehabilitation.

== History ==
Rhinectomy has traditionally been a form of disfiguring judicial corporal punishment. The ancient Egyptians removed the noses of some criminals and exiled them to the Sinai towns of Tjaru or Rhinocorura, whose own name was Greek for "nose removal". The Byzantine Empire, believing that their emperor should represent a human ideal, removed the noses of both criminals and rival emperors, with the idea that such disfigurement disqualified its recipients from office. The notable exception was the second reign of Justinian II, who gained the epithet Rhinotmetus or "the Slit-Nose".

== See also ==
- List of surgeries by type
