= Actisanes =

Ancient Greek mythological King of Ethiopia

Actisanes (Ancient Greek: Ἀκτισάνης) was a legendary king of Aethiopia who conquered Egypt. He founded the city of Rhinocolura on the confines of Egypt and Syria, and was succeeded by Mendes, an Egyptian. Diodorus Siculus says that Actisanes conquered Egypt in the reign of Amasis. Some scholars had read this as Amasis II. However, Amasis II, being a contemporary of Cyrus the Great, cannot be meant, which resulted in an alternate reading of "Ammosis".

== See also ==
- Aktisanes
