= 2015–16 Al Ahly SC season =

Al Ahly
2015–16 season
- Chairman: (Egypt) Mahmoud Taher
- Manager: (Portugal) José Peseiro (until 18 January 2016) (Egypt) Abdul-Aziz Abdul-Shafi (until 1 March 2016) (Netherlands) Martin Jol (from 1 March 2016)
- Stadium: Borg El Arab Stadium
- Premier League: Winners
- Egypt Cup: Runner-up
- Super Cup: Winners
- CAF Champions League: Group stage
- Top goalscorer: League: Mo'men Zakaria (12); Malick Evouna (12); All: Abdallah Said (14)
Home colours	Away colours
- All statistics correct as of 8 August 2016.

The 2015–16 Al Ahly SC season was the 57th edition in the Egyptian Premier League and 57th consecutive season in the topflight of Egyptian football. The club participated in the Premier League, Egypt Cup, Super Cup and the CAF Champions League.

== Squad information ==
=== Current squad ===
No.	Name	Nationality	Position(s)	Date of birth (age)
Goalkeepers
1	Sherif Ekramy (Vice-captain)	(Egypt)	GK	1 July 1983 (age 32)
13	Ahmed Adel Abd El-Moneam	(Egypt)	GK	April 10, 1987 (age 28)
16	Mossad Awad	(Egypt)	GK	January 15, 1993 (age 22)
Defenders
2	Sherif Hazem	(Egypt)	CB	7 July 1989 (age 26)
3	Ramy Rabia	(Egypt)	RB / CB / DM	20 May 1993 (age 22)
6	Sabry Raheel	(Egypt)	LB	2 October 1987 (age 27)
7	Hussein Sayed	(Egypt)	LB	September 18, 1991 (age 23)
24	Ahmed Fathy	(Egypt)	RB / DM	10 November 1984 (age 30)
20	Saad Samir	(Egypt)	CB	April 1, 1989 (age 26)
23	Mohamed Nagieb	(Egypt)	CB	January 13, 1983 (age 32)
12	Basem Ali	(Egypt)	RB	27 October 1988 (age 26)
30	Mohamed Hany	(Egypt)	RB	January 25, 1996 (age 19)
5	Ahmed Hegazy	(Egypt)	CB	January 25, 1991 (age 24)
Midfielders
8	Mo'men Zakaria	(Egypt)	RM / LM	12 April 1988 (age 27)
11	Walid Soliman	(Egypt)	AM / LM	1 December 1984 (age 30)
14	Hossam Ghaly (captain)	(Egypt)	CM / DM	15 December 1981 (age 33)
18	Ahmed El Sheikh	(Egypt)	RM / LM	September 9, 1992 (age 23)
19	Abdallah El Saïd	(Egypt)	AM / CM	13 July 1985 (age 30)
22	Saleh Gomaa	(Egypt)	DM / CM	1 August 1993 (age 22)
25	Hossam Ashour (Vice-captain)	(Egypt)	CM / DM	March 9, 1986 (age 29)
32	Ramadan Sobhi	(Egypt)	RM / LM	May 14, 1997 (age 18)
Forwards
17	Mohamed Hamdy	(Egypt)	SS / AM	December 13, 1991 (age 23)
9	Amr Gamal	(Egypt)	SS	August 4, 1991 (age 24)
10	Emad Moteab (Vice-captain)	(Egypt)	ST	20 February 1983 (age 32)
15	Malick Evouna	(Gabon)	SS / ST	28 November 1992 (age 22)
29	John Antwi	(Ghana)	ST	6 August 1992 (age 23)
21	Ahmed Abd El-Zaher	(Egypt)	ST	January 15, 1985 (age 30

=== Out on loan ===
Note: Flags indicate national team as defined under FIFA eligibility rules; some limited exceptions apply. Players may hold more than one non-FIFA nationality.

No.	Pos.	Nation	Player
—	MF	EGY	Trezeguet (on loan to RSC Anderlecht until 30/06/2016)
—	MF	EGY	Amr Warda (on loan to Panetolikos until 30/06/2016)
—	MF	EGY	Mohamed Rizk (on loan to El Geish until 30/06/2016)
—	MF	EGY	Islam Roshdi (on loan to El Haras until 30/06/2016)

No.	Pos.	Nation	Player
—	MF	EGY	Mohamed Hassan (on loan to El Haras until 30/06/2016)
—	DF	EGY	Islam Serry (on loan to Petrojet until 30/06/2016)
—	MF	EGY	Ahmed Ramdan Beckham (on loan to El Haras until 30/06/2016)
—	FW	EGY	Mohamed Hamdy Zaky (on loan to Smouha until 30/06/2016)

=== Summer Transfers ===
==== In ====
No.	Nat.	Name	From
3	(Egypt)	Rami Rabia	Sporting Lisbon
5	(Egypt)	Ahmed Hegazy	Free agent
15	(Gabon)	Malick Evouna	Al Wydad
17	(Egypt)	Mohamed Hamdy Zaky	Free agent
18	(Egypt)	Ahmed El Sheikh	Misr El Makasa
22	(Egypt)	Saleh Gomaa	Enppi
24	(Egypt)	Ahmed Fathy	Free agent
29	(Ghana)	John Antwi	Al Shabab

== 2015 Egyptian Super Cup ==
15 October 2015	Zamalek	2–3	Al Ahly	Hazza Bin Zayed Stadium, Al Ain, United Arab Emirates
20:00 (UTC+4)	Gaber 26'; Kahraba 90'		Abdallah 45+4' (pen.), 52' (pen.); Mo'men 69'	Attendance: 25,000; Referee: Carlos Carballo (Spain)

Note: The team is managed by the Interim Coach Abdelaziz Abdelshafy in the 2015 Egyptian Super Cup.

2015 Egyptian Super Cup winners
(Egypt)
Al Ahly
Ninth title

== 2015–16 Egyptian Premier League ==
=== Position ===
Pos	Team	Pld	W	D	L	GF	GA	GD	Pts	Qualification or relegation
1	Al Ahly (C)	34	23	7	4	65	24	+41	76	Qualification for the Champions League
2	Zamalek	34	20	9	5	49	25	+24	69	Qualification for the Champions League
3	Smouha	34	13	16	5	45	37	+8	55 (Note: Smouha ahead of Al Masry on head-to-head record; Smouha–Al Masry 1–0, Al Masry–Smouha 1–1.)	Qualification for the Confederation Cup (Note: Since the winners of the 2015–16 Egypt Cup, Zamalek, qualified for African competition based on league position, the spot awarded to the Cup winner (Confederation Cup) was passed to the fourth-placed team which were the next best teams in the table not already qualified for any African competition.)

Source: Soccerway
Rules for classification: 1) Points; 2) Head-to-Head points; 3) Head-to-Head goal difference; 4) Head-to-Head goal scored; 5) Head-to-Head away goal scored; 6) Goal difference; 7) Goal scored.
(C) Champions

=== Results ===
==== Results by round ====
Round	1	2	3	4	5	6	7	8	9	10	11	12	13	14	15	16	17	18	19	20	21	22	23	24	25	26	27	28	29	30	31	32	33	34
Ground	A	H	A	A	A	H	A	H	H	A	H	A	H	A	H	A	H	H	A	H	H	H	A	H	A	A	H	A	H	A	H	A	H	A
Result	W	W	W	L	W	W	D	L	W	D	W	W	W	D	W	W	W	D	D	W	W	W	W	L	W	W	L	W	W	W	W	W	D	D
Position	7	1	1	3	1	3	1	9	9	9	6	4	1	2	2	1	1	1	1	1	1	1	1	1	1	1	1	1	1	1	1	1	1	1

Updated to match(es) played on 9 July 2016. Source:
A = Away; H = Home; W = Win; D = Draw; L = Loss

==== Results overview ====
Win Draw Loss

Team	Home score	Away score
Tala'ea El-Gaish	0–0	1-0
Ghazl El Mahalla	2–0	1-1
Petrojet	2–0	1–0
Misr Lel-Makkasa	2–1	0-1
Enppi	2–0	2–0
Ittihad El Shorta	7–3	5–3
Al Masry	2-3	2–2
Smouha	0–3	3–1
Haras El Hodoud	3–0	4–0
Wadi Degla	0–1	0–0
Aswan	3–1	4–0
El-Entag El-Harby	2–0	1–0
El Mokawloon	3–1	3–0
El Dakhelya	2–0	1–1
Ismaily	1–0	2–1
El Ittihad	1–1	1–0
Zamalek	2–0	0–0

==== Match details ====
22 October 2015 1	Tala'ea El Geish	0-1	Al Ahly	Petro Sport Stadium, Cairo
19:45 UTC+02:00			Abdallah 75'

25 October 2015 2	Al Ahly	2-0	Ghazl El Mahalla	Petro Sport Stadium, Cairo
19:45 UTC+02:00	Abdallah 38' (pen.); Ghaly 82'

1 November 2015 3	Petrojet	0-1	Al Ahly	Suez Stadium, Suez
17:00 UTC+02:00			Meteab 90+1'

5 November 2015 4	Misr El Makasa	1-0	Al Ahly	Petro Sport Stadium, Cairo
20:00 UTC+2:00	Samy 57'

3 February 2016 5	Enppi	0-2	Al Ahly	Petro Sport Stadium, Cairo
20:00 UTC+2:00			Gamal 36'; Mo'men 79'

7 January 2016 6	Al Ahly	7-3	Ittihad El Shorta	Borg El Arab Stadium, Alexandria
18:00 UTC+2:00	Evouna 21' 45+2'; Rabia 26' 57'; Saleh 39'; Ramadan 41'; Meteab 76'		Galal 23'; Agogo 38'; Rico 79' (pen.)

23 February 2016 7	Al Masry	2-2	Al Ahly	Borg El Arab Stadium, Alexandria
	Yasser 11'; Magdy 58' (pen.)		Mo'men 26'; Evouna 78'

17 December 2015 8	Al Ahly	0-3	Smouha	Petro Sport Stadium, Cairo
21:45 UTC+02:00			Kamar 24' (pen.); Mohareb 60' 85'

22 December 2015 9	Al Ahly	3-0	Haras El Hodoud	Borg El Arab Stadium, Alexandria
18:00 UTC+02:00	Evouna 27' 62'; Saleh 90+2'

26 December 2015 10	Wadi Degla	0-0	Al Ahly	Petro Sport Stadium, Cairo
19:45 UTC+02:00

29 December 2015 11	Al Ahly	3-1	Aswan	Borg El Arab Stadium, Alexandria
18:00 UTC+03:00	Mo'men 13' 45+3'; Evouna 68'		Shokry 33'

3 January 2015 12	El Entag El Harby	0-1	Al Ahly	El Salam Stadium, Cairo
19:45 UTC+02:00			Meteab 90+6'

10 January 2016 13	Al Ahly	3-1	Al Mokawloon	Borg El Arab Stadium, Alexandria
19:00 UTC+02:00	Mo'men 14'; Abdallah 54' 74'		Sherif 90'

14 January 2016 14	El Dakhleya	1-1	Al Ahly	Petro Sport Stadium, Cairo
19:45 UTC+02:00	Marei 42'		Farouk 77' (o.g.)

20 January 2016 15	Al Ahly	1-0	Ismaily	Borg El Arab Stadium, Alexandria
17:00 UTC+02:00	Abdallah 45'

23 January 2016 16	Al Ittihad	0-1	Al Ahly	Alexandria Stadium, Alexandria
15:00 UTC+02:00			Antwi 64'

9 February 2016 17	Al Ahly	2-0	Zamalek	Borg El Arab Stadium, Alexandria
18:00 UTC+02:00	Evouna 56'; Gamal 89'

13 February 2016 18	Al Ahly	0-0	Tala'ea El Geish	Suez Stadium, Suez
18:00 UTC+02:00

18 February 2016 19	Ghazl El Mahalla	1-1	Al Ahly	Alexandria Stadium, Alexandria
17:00 UTC+02:00	Yehia 48'		Ramadan 90+6'

2 March 2016 20	Al Ahly	2-0	Petrojet	Borg El Arab Stadium, Alexandria
18:00 UTC+02:00	Abdallah 62' (pen.) 66'

5 March 2016 21	Al Ahly	2-1	Misr El Makasa	Borg El Arab Stadium, Alexandria
18:00 UTC+02:00	Ramadan 42'; Gamal 76'		Mido 59'

15 April 2016 22	Al Ahly	2-0	Enppi	Borg El Arab Stadium, Alexandria
19:00 UTC+02:00	Abdallah 42'; Mo'men 79'

3 April 2016 23	Ittihad El Shorta	3-5	Al Ahly	Petro Sport Stadium, Cairo
20:00 UTC+02:00	Rico 45+2' (pen.); Cissé 49' 57'		Mo'men 17'; Fathy 22' 45'; Abdelsalam 44' (o.g.); Gamal 78'

13 June 2016 24	Al Ahly	2-3	Al Masry	Borg El Arab Stadium, Alexandria
22:00 UTC+02:00	Ramadan 69' (pen.); Ghaly 88'		Dao 4'; Caporia 32'; Mosaad 54'

26 April 2016 25	Smouha	1-3	Al Ahly	Alexandria Stadium, Alexandria
18:00 UTC+02:00	Mohareb 24'		Abdallah 35' 68' (pen.); Mo'men 78'

4 May 2016 26	Haras El Hodoud	0-4	Al Ahly	El Max Stadium, Alexandria
20:30 UTC+02:00			Rabia 38'; Mo'men 53' 70'; Saad 80' (o.g.)

7 May 2016 27	Al Ahly	0-1	Wadi Degla	Borg El Arab Stadium, Alexandria
20:30 UTC+02:00			Mapuku 90+5'

12 May 2016 28	Aswan	0-4	Al Ahly	Aswan Stadium, Aswan
20:30 UTC+02:00			Rabia 40'; Evouna 42'; Abdallah 45+3'; Mo'men 72'

17 May 2016 29	Al Ahly	2-0	El Entag El Harby	Borg El Arab Stadium, Alexandria
19:00 UTC+02:00	Magdy 58' (o.g.); Antwi 80'

25 May 2016 30	Al Mokawloon	0-3	Al Ahly	Osman Ahmed Osman Stadium, Cairo
19:00 UTC+02:00			Evouna 21'; Evouna 42'; Mo'men 68'

9 June 2016 31	Al Ahly	2-0	El Dakhleya	Borg El Arab Stadium, Alexandria
22:00 UTC+02:00	Evouna 64' 69'

24 June 2016 32	Ismaily	1-2	Al Ahly	Petro Sport Stadium, Cairo
22:00 UTC+02:00	Banahene 18'		Ramadan 10'; Walid 12'

3 July 2016 33	Al Ahly	1-1	Al Ittihad	Borg El Arab Stadium, Cairo
22:00 UTC+02:00	Meteab 34'		El Alfy 79'

9 July 2016 34	Zamalek	0-0	Al Ahly	Suez Stadium, Suez
21:30 UTC+02:00

== 2016 Egypt Cup ==
=== Round 32 ===
30 March 2016	Al Ahly	3–0	Dayrout	Alexandria Stadium, Alexandria
19:00 UTC+02:00	Fathy 11'; El Sheikh 61', 64'			Referee: Mohamed Saber

=== Round of 16 ===
12 July 2016	Al Ahly	2–1	Haras El Hodoud	Alexandria Stadium, Alexandria
18:30 UTC+02:00	Meteab 31' (pen.); El Solaya 67'		Benzema 84' (pen.)	Referee: Abdel Aziz El Sayed

=== Quarter-finals ===
1 August 2016	Al Ahly	1–0	Smouha	Suez Stadium, Suez
20:30	Samir 45'	Report		Referee: Ibrahim Nour El Din

=== Semi-finals ===
4 August 2016	ENPPI	1–2	Al Ahly	Suez Stadium, Suez
20:30	El Shamy 29'		Zakaria 82'; Samir 85'	Referee: Samir Osman

=== Final ===
8 August 2016	Zamalek	3–1	Al Ahly	Borg El Arab Stadium, Alexandria
20:30 UTC+2	Morsy 20', 25' (pen.); M. Fathi 59'		Said 33' (pen.)	Referee: Andó-Szabó Sándor (Hungary)

Zamalek	Al Ahly

GK	1	(Egypt) Ahmed El Shenawy	(yellow card) 84'
RB	6	(Egypt) Shawky El Said
CB	7	(Egypt) Islam Gamal
CB	25	(Egypt) Ali Gabr
LB	27	(Egypt) Ali Fathy		(substituted off) 76'
DM	3	(Egypt) Tarek Hamed
CM	4	(Egypt) Ahmed Tawfik
CM	15	(Nigeria) Maarouf Youssef
RW	10	(Egypt) Shikabala (c)		(substituted off) 51'
LW	14	(Egypt) Ayman Hefny		(substituted off) 65'
FW	17	(Egypt) Basem Morsy	(yellow card) 7'
Substitutes:
GK	28	(Egypt) Omar Salah
DF	19	(Egypt) Ahmed Duiedar
DF	33	(Egypt) Osama Ibrahim
MF	11	(Egypt) Mohamed Nasef		(substituted on) 65'
MF	5	(Egypt) Ibrahim Salah		(substituted on) 76'
FW	9	(Egypt) Ahmed Gaafar
FW	30	(Egypt) Mostafa Fathi		(substituted on) 51'
Manager:
(Egypt) Moamen Soliman

GK	13	(Egypt) Ahmed Adel
RB	3	(Egypt) Ramy Rabia	(yellow card) 62'
CB	20	(Egypt) Saad Samir
LB	6	(Egypt) Sabri Raheel
DM	25	(Egypt) Hossam Ashour		(substituted off) 68'
RM	20	(Egypt) Ahmed Fathy	(yellow card) 88' (yellow-red card) 90+1'
CM	14	(Egypt) Hossam Ghaly (c)	(yellow card) 65' (yellow-red card) 83'
LM	11	(Egypt) Walid Soliman		(substituted off) 63'
AM	8	(Egypt) Moamen Zakaria
FW	9	(Egypt) Amr Gamal		(substituted off) 58'
FW	19	(Egypt) Abdallah Said
Substitutes:
GK	16	(Egypt) Mohamed El Shenawy
DF	21	(Tunisia) Ali Maâloul
DF	23	(Egypt) Mohamed Nagieb
DF	24	(Egypt) Mohamed Hany
MF	15	(Egypt) Mohamed Gaber		(substituted on) 68'
FW	4	(Egypt) Marwan Mohsen		(substituted on) 63'
FW	10	(Egypt) Emad Moteab		(substituted on) 58'
Manager:
(Netherlands) Martin Jol

- Assistant referees:
- Peter Berettyan (Hungary)
- Zsolt Varga (Hungary)
- Fourth official:
- Mohamed Maarouf (Egypt)

Match rules:

- 90 minutes.
- 30 minutes of extra time if necessary.
- Penalty shoot-out if scores still level.
- Seven named substitutes, of which up to three may be used.

== 2016 CAF Champions League ==
=== Round 32 ===
Team 1	Agg.	Team 2	1st leg	2nd leg
Recreativo do Libolo (Angola)	0–2	(Egypt) Al Ahly	0–0	0–2

12 March 2016	Recreativo do Libolo (Angola)	0–0	(Egypt) Al Ahly	Estádio Municipal de Calulo, Calulo
15:00 UTC+1		Report		Referee: Davies Omweno (Kenya)

19 March 2016	Al Ahly (Egypt)	2–0	(Angola) Recreativo do Libolo	Borg El Arab Stadium, Alexandria
18:00 UTC+2	Ramadan 10'; Antwi 83'	Report		Referee: Malang Diedhiou (Senegal)

Al Ahly won 2–0 on aggregate.

=== Round 16 ===
Team 1	Agg.	Team 2	1st leg	2nd leg
Young Africans (Tanzania)	2–3	(Egypt) Al Ahly	1–1	1–2

9 April 2016	Young Africans (Tanzania)	1–1	(Egypt) Al Ahly	National Stadium, Dar es Salaam
16:00 UTC+3	Hegazy 19' (o.g.)	Report	Gamal 10'	Referee: Denis Dembélé (Ivory Coast)

20 April 2016	Al Ahly (Egypt)	2–1	(Tanzania) Young Africans	Borg El Arab Stadium, Alexandria
19:30 UTC+2	Ghaly 53'; Abdallah 90+6'	Report	Ngoma 67'	Referee: Mahamadou Keita (Mali)

Al Ahly won 3–2 on aggregate.

=== Group stage ===
Group A

Pos	Team	Pld	W	D	L	GF	GA	GD	Pts	Qualification
1	(Morocco) Wydad AC	6	3	2	1	6	3	+3	11	Knockout stage
2	(Zambia) ZESCO United	6	2	3	1	10	9	+1	9	Knockout stage
3	(Egypt) Al Ahly	6	1	3	2	6	7	−1	6	
4	(Ivory Coast) ASEC Mimosas	6	1	2	3	5	8	−3	5	

Source: CAF
Rules for classification: Group stage tiebreakers

Match Details

18 June 2016 1	ZESCO United (Zambia)	3–2	(Egypt) Al Ahly	Levy Mwanawasa Stadium, Ndola
15:30 UTC+2	Ching'andu 27'; Chama 49', 56'	Report	Antwi 31', 68'	Referee: Davies Omweno (Kenya)

28 June 2016	Al Ahly (Egypt)	1–2	(Ivory Coast) ASEC Mimosas	Borg El Arab Stadium, Alexandria
22:00 UTC+2	Hegazy 53'	Report	Zakri 29'; Niamke 80'	Referee: El Fadil Mohamed (Sudan)

16 July 2016 3	Al Ahly (Egypt)	0–0	(Morocco) Wydad Casablanca	Borg El Arab Stadium, Alexandria
19:30 UTC+2		Report		Referee: Youssef Essrayri (Tunisia)

27 July 2016 4	Wydad Casablanca (Morocco)	0–1	(Egypt) Al Ahly	Prince Moulay Abdellah Stadium, Rabat
19:30 UTC+1		Report	Rabia 47'	Referee: Mehdi Abid Charef (Algeria)

12 August 2016 5	Al Ahly (Egypt)	2–2	(Zambia) ZESCO United	Suez Stadium, Suez
21:30 UTC+2	Rabia 31'; Meteab 85'	Report	Were 6', 35'	Referee: Sidi Alioum (Cameroon)

24 August 2016 6	ASEC Mimosas (Ivory Coast)	0–0	(Egypt) Al-Ahly	Stade Robert Champroux, Abidjan
14:30 UTC+0		Report		Referee: Daniel Bennett (South Africa)

== Champions Golden Cup ==
Friendly cup organized by IMCC Sports Co. between Al Ahly and Roma.

20 May 2016	Al Ahly (Egypt)	4–3	(Italy) Roma	Hazza Bin Zayed Stadium, Al Ain, United Arab Emirates
20:15 UTC+4	Antwi 13'; Mo'men.Z 42'; Soliman 55'; Sheikh 90+4'		Džeko 20'; Salah 41'; Vainqueur 90+1'
