= 2016–17 Al Ahly SC season =

Al Ahly
2016–17 season
- Chairman: (Egypt) Mahmoud Taher
- Manager: (Egypt) Hossam El-Badry
- Egyptian Premier League: Champion
- Egyptian Super Cup: runner-up
- Egypt Cup: Champion
- CAF Champions League: Quarter-final (progress continued in next season)
- Arab Club Championship: Semi-final
Home colours colours	Away colours colours

The 2016–17 Al Ahly SC season was the 58th edition in the Egyptian Premier League and 58th consecutive season in the topflight of Egyptian football. The club participated in the Premier League, Egypt Cup, Super Cup, and the CAF Champions League.

== Squad ==
=== Current squad ===
Squad No.	Name	Nationality	Position(s)	Date of birth (age)
Goalkeepers
1	Sherif Ekramy	(Egypt)	GK	1 July 1983 (age 43)
13	Ahmed Adel Abd El-Moneam	(Egypt)	GK	10 April 1987 (age 39)
16	Mossad Awad	(Egypt)	GK	15 January 1993 (age 33)
26	Mohamed El-Shenawy	(Egypt)	GK	18 December 1988 (age 37)
Centerbacks
3	Ramy Rabia	(Egypt)	CB	20 May 1993 (age 33)
5	Ahmed Hegazy	(Egypt)	CB	25 January 1991 (age 35)
20	Saad Samir	(Egypt)	CB	1 April 1989 (age 37)
23	Mohamed Nagieb	(Egypt)	CB	13 January 1983 (age 43)
Fullbacks
6	Sabry Raheel	(Egypt)	LB	2 October 1987 (age 39)
7	Hussein Sayed	(Egypt)	LB	18 September 1991 (age 35)
12	Basem Ali	(Egypt)	RB	27 October 1988 (age 38)
21	Ali Maâloul	(Tunisia)	LB	1 January 1990 (age 36)
24	Ahmed Fathy	(Egypt)	RB / DM	10 November 1984 (age 42)
30	Mohamed Hany	(Egypt)	RB	25 January 1996 (age 30)
Defensive midfielders
14	Hossam Ghaly	(Egypt)	DM	15 December 1981 (age 44)
17	Amr Al-Sulaya	(Egypt)	DM	4 February 1990 (age 36)
25	Hossam Ashour	(Egypt)	DM	9 March 1986 (age 40)
38	Akram Tawfik	(Egypt)	AM	8 November 1997 (age 29)
Attacking midfielders
4	Amr Barakat	(Egypt)	AM	1 October 1991 (age 35)
19	Abdallah El Said	(Egypt)	AM	13 July 1985 (age 41)
22	Saleh Gomaa	(Egypt)	AM	1 August 1993 (age 33)
27	Mohamed Gaber	(Egypt)	AM	9 May 1995 (age 31)
34	Ahmed Hamdy	(Egypt)	AM	10 February 1998 (age 28)
35	Karim Nedvěd	(Egypt)	AM	8 August 1997 (age 29)
Wingers
8	Moamen Zakaria	(Egypt)	LW	12 April 1988 (age 38)
11	Walid Soliman	(Egypt)	RW	1 December 1984 (age 41)
Strikers
18	Marwan Mohsen	(Egypt)	ST	26 February 1989 (age 37)
9	Amr Gamal	(Egypt)	ST	4 August 1991 (age 35)
10	Emad Moteab	(Egypt)	ST	20 February 1983 (age 43)
15	Souleymane Coulibaly	(Ivory Coast)	ST	26 December 1994 (age 31)
26	Junior Ajayi	(Nigeria)	ST	29 January 1996 (age 30)

== Transfers ==
=== Transfers in ===
Date from	Position	Nationality	Name	From	Fee
July 2016	ST	(Nigeria)	Junior Ajayi	CS Sfaxien	$2.5M
July 2016	ST	(Egypt)	Marwan Mohsen	Ismaily	$500,000
July 2016	AM	(Egypt)	Mohamed Gaber	Misr Lel-Makkasa SC	$475,000
July 2016	AM	(Egypt)	Akram Tawfik	ENPPI	$320,000
July 2016	LB	(Tunisia)	Ali Maâloul	CS Sfaxien	$750,000
July 2016	GK	(Egypt)	Mohamed El-Shenawy	Petrojet FC	$160,000
February 2017	FW	(Egypt)	Amr Barakat	Lierse S.K.	$265,000
February 2017	FW	(Ivory Coast)	Souleymane Coulibaly	Kilmarnock F.C.	$800,000

=== Transfers out ===
Date from	Position	Nationality	Name	To	Fee
July 2016	LW	(Egypt)	Ramadan Sobhi	Stoke City	$7M
July 2016	ST	(Gabon)	Malick Evouna	Tianjin Teda	$8M
July 2016	ST	(Egypt)	Ahmed Abd El-Zaher	Misr Lel-Makkasa SC	Free
July 2016	AM	(Egypt)	Mohamed Rizk	Tala'ea El Gaish	Undisclosed

=== Loans out ===
Date from	Position	Nationality	Name	To	Date until
July 2016	LW	(Egypt)	Ahmed El Sheikh	Misr Lel-Makkasa SC	July 2017
July 2016	LW	(Egypt)	Mohamed Rizk	Tala'ea El-Gaish SC	July 2017
July 2016	LW	(Egypt)	Islam El Far	Aswan SC	July 2017
January 2017	FW	(Ghana)	John Antwi	Misr Lel-Makkasa SC	July 2017
January 2017	FW	(Egypt)	Mohamed Hamdy Zaky	Enppi	July 2017

== 2016 Egyptian Super Cup ==
10 February 2017
20:00 (UTC+4)

Al Ahly	0–0	Zamalek
Penalties
Zakaria (penalty missed); Hegazy (penalty scored); Gomma (penalty missed); Ghaly (penalty missed)	1–3	(penalty scored) Morsy; (penalty scored) O. Ibrahim; (penalty scored) Refaat

Mohammed Bin Zayed Stadium, Abu Dhabi
Attendance: 35,000
Referee: Pavel Královec (Czech Republic)

Al Ahly	Zamalek

GK	1	(Egypt) Sherif Ekramy
RB	30	(Egypt) Mohamed Hany
CB	20	(Egypt) Saad Samir
CB	5	(Egypt) Ahmed Hegazy
LB	7	(Egypt) Hussein El Sayed	(yellow card) 61'
CDM	24	(Egypt) Ahmed Fathy		(substituted off) 78'
CDM	25	(Egypt) Hossam Ashour
CAM	19	(Egypt) Abdallah El Said		(substituted off) 70'
RM	11	(Egypt) Walid Soliman		(substituted off) 84'
LM	9	(Egypt) Mo'men Zakaria
FW	28	(Nigeria) Junior Ajayi
Substitutes:
GK	13	(Egypt) Ahmed Adel
MF	23	(Egypt) Mohamed Naguib
LB	6	(Egypt) Sabry Raheel
CAM	15	(Egypt) Saleh Gomaa		(substituted on) 70'
RM	35	(Egypt) Karim Nedvěd		(substituted on) 84'
CDM	14	(Egypt) Hossam Ghaly		(substituted on) 78'
MF	9	(Egypt) Amr Gamal
Manager:
(Egypt) Hossam El-Badry

GK	16	(Egypt) Gennesh
RB	29	(Egypt) Osama Ibrahim
CB	25	(Egypt) Ali Gabr
CB	28	(Egypt) Mahmoud Hamdy El Wensh
LB	11	(Egypt) Mohamed Nasef
DM	3	(Egypt) Tarek Hamed
CM	4	(Egypt) Ahmed Tawfik
CM	15	(Burkina Faso) Maarouf Youssef		(substituted off) 70'
RW	20	(Egypt) Mohamed Ibrahim		(substituted off) 55'
LW	23	(Nigeria) Stanley Ohawuchi		(substituted off) 85'
FW	17	(Egypt) Basem Morsy	(yellow card) 40'
Substitutes:
GK	1	(Egypt) Ahmed El-Shenawy
DF	6	(Egypt) Shawky El Said
MF	13	(Egypt) Mahmoud Abdel-Aati Dunga	(yellow card) 82'	(substituted on) 70'
MF	18	(Egypt) Ahmed Refaat		(substituted on) 85'
AM	30	(Egypt) Mostafa Fathi		(substituted on) 55'
FW	9	(Egypt) Ahmed Gaafar
FW	19	(Egypt) Hossam Paolo
Manager:
(Egypt) Mohammed Helmy

- Assistant referees:
- Fourth official:

Match rules:

- 90 minutes.
- Penalty shoot-out if scores still level.
- Seven named substitutes, of which up to three may be used.

== 2016–17 Egyptian Premier League ==
=== Position ===
Pos	Team	Pld	W	D	L	GF	GA	GD	Pts	Qualification or relegation
1	Al Ahly (C)	34	25	9	0	62	14	+48	84	Qualification for the Champions League
2	Misr Lel Makkasa	34	23	5	6	65	34	+31	74	Qualification for the Champions League
3	Zamalek (Note: Zamalek was deducted three points as they did not show up to their home match against Misr Lel Makkasa.)	34	20	6	8	42	24	+18	63	Qualification for the Confederation Cup (Note: Since the winners of the 2016–17 Egypt Cup, Al Ahly, qualified for African competition based on league position, the spot awarded to the Cup winner (Confederation Cup) was given to the Cup runners-up, Al Masry.)
4	Al Masry	34	19	5	10	51	36	+15	62	Qualification for the Confederation Cup
5	Smouha	34	15	12	7	49	40	+9	57	

Source: Soccerway
Rules for classification: 1) Points; 2) Head-to-Head points; 3) Head-to-Head goal difference; 4) Head-to-Head goal scored; 5) Head-to-Head away goal scored; 6) Goal difference; 7) Goal scored.
(C) Champions

=== Results ===
==== Results by round ====
Round	1	2	3	4	5	6	7	8	9	10	11	12	13	14	15	16	17	18	19	20	21	22	23	24	25	26	27	28	29	30	31	32	33	34
Ground	H	A	H	A	H	A	H	A	A	H	A	H	H	H	A	H	A	A	H	A	H	A	H	A	H	H	A	H	A	A	A	H	A	H
Result	W	W	W	W	W	D	D	W	W	W	W	W	W	W	D	W	W	D	W	W	W	W	W	W	W	D	W	W	D	D	W	D	D	W
Position	7	2	2	2	1	1	1	1	1	1	1	1	1	1	1	1	1	1	1	1	1	1	1	1	1	1	1	1	1	1	1	1	1	1

Updated to match(es) played on 17 July 2017. Source:
A = Away; H = Home; W = Win; D = Draw; L = Loss

==== Match details ====
17 September 2016 1	Al Ahly	1-0	Ismaily	Petro Sport Stadium, Cairo
21:00 UTC+02:00	Abdallah 78' (pen.)

22 September 2016 2	El Mokawloon	0-2	Al Ahly	Petro Sport Stadium, Cairo
20:00 UTC+02:00			Naguib 18'; Abdallah 68'

28 September 2016 3	Al Ahly	2-1	Wadi Degla	Petro Sport Stadium, Cairo
21:00 UTC+02:00	Nedvěd 18'; Mo'men 58'		Galal 54' (pen.)

15 October 2016 4	El Dakhelya	0-2	Al Ahly	Petro Sport Stadium, Cairo
19:00 UTC+02:00			Antwi 46'; Mo'men 60'

20 October 2016 5	Al Ahly	2-0	Aswan	Petro Sport Stadium, Cairo
20:30 UTC+02:00	Mo'men 46'; Walid 76'

25 October 2016 6	Petrojet	0-0	Al Ahly	Suez Stadium, Suez
17:30 UTC+02:00

30 October 2016 7	Al Ahly	2-2	El Ittihad	Petro Sport Stadium, Cairo
20:00 UTC+02:00	Walid 4'; Ajayi 69'		Kamar 60'; Kassongo 68'

4 November 2016 8	Tanta	0-1	Al Ahly	El Mahalla Stadium, El Mahalla
15:00 UTC+02:00			Maâloul 32' (pen.)

19 November 2016 9	El Entag El Harby	0-2	Al Ahly	El Salam Stadium, Cairo
19:00 UTC+02:00			Ajayi 49'; Abdallah 65'

23 November 2016 10	Al Ahly	3-0	Tala'ea El Gaish	El Salam Stadium, Cairo
19:00 UTC+02:00	Mo'men 73'; Abdallah 77'; Ajayi 82'

27 November 2016 11	Al Nasr Lel Ta'din	0-3	Al Ahly	Aswan Stadium. Aswan
20:00 UTC+02:00			Walid 61' (pen.) 84'; Ajayi 71'

30 November 2016 12	Al Ahly	3-0	El Sharkia	El Salam Stadium, Cairo
20:00 UTC+02:00	Walid 9'; Fathy 69'; Mo'men 87'

4 December 2016 13	Al Ahly	1-0	Misr Lel Makkasa	El Salam Stadium, Cairo
20:00 UTC+02:00	Abdallah 22' (pen.)

8 December 2016 14	Al Ahly	1-0	Smouha	El Salam Stadium, Cairo
20:30 UTC+02:00	Saad 90+4'

12 December 2016 15	Enppi	0-0	Al Ahly	Petro Sport Stadium, Cairo
18:00 UTC+02:00

18 December 2016 16	Al Ahly	3-1	Al Masry	Borg El Arab Stadium, Alexandria
20:00 UTC+02:00	Marwan 3'; Saad 48'; Abdallah 90' (pen.)		Safi 81'

29 December 2016 17	Zamalek	0-2	Al Ahly	Petro Sport Stadium, Cairo
19:00 UTC+02:00			Mo'men 22'; Ajayi 89'

15 February 2017 18	Ismaily	0-0	Al Ahly	Suez Stadium, Suez
17:00 UTC+02:00

19 February 2017 19	Al Ahly	2-0	El Mokawloon	El Salam Stadium, Cairo
17:00 UTC+02:00	Meteab 75'; Mo'men 79'

23 February 2017 20	Wadi Degla	0-1	Al Ahly	Petro Sport Stadium, Cairo
20:00 UTC+02:00			Gamal 80'

1 April 2017 21	Al Ahly	4-0	El Dakhelya	El Salam Stadium, Cairo
20:00 UTC+02:00	Saad 60'; Walid 70'; Coulibaly 79' 90+3'

16 April 2017 22	Aswan	0-2	Al Ahly	Aswan Stadium, Aswan
21:15 UTC+02:00			Gaber 7'; Coulibaly 10'

6 April 2017 23	Al Ahly	2-0	Petrojet	El Salam Stadium, Cairo
19:00 UTC+02:00	Coulibaly 40'; Walid 78'

11 April 2017 24	El Ittihad	0-1	Al Ahly	Borg El Arab Stadium, Alexandria
18:00 UTC+02:00			El Sulaya 45+1'

24 April 2017 25	Al Ahly	1-0	Tanta	El Salam Stadium, Cairo
20:00 UTC+02:00	Coulibaly 36'

30 April 2017 26	Al Ahly	1-1	El Entag El Harby	El Salam Stadium, Cairo
19:00 UTC+02:00	Ajayi 51'		Oukri 48'

4 May 2017 27	Tala'ea El Gaish	1-2	Al Ahly	Suez Stadium, Suez
19:00 UTC+02:00	Moatamed 57'		Abdallah 25' (pen.); Gaber 90+4'

8 May 2017 28	Al Ahly	4-0	Al Nasr Lel Ta'din	El Salam Stadium, Cairo
18:15 UTC+02:00	Abdallah 33' 51' 70'; Coulibaly 61'

17 May 2017 29	El Sharkia	1-1	Al Ahly	El Salam Stadium, Cairo
18:30 UTC+02:00	Shika 82'		Saad 45'

29 May 2017 30	Misr Lel Makkasa	2-2	Al Ahly	Suez Stadium, Suez
22:00 UTC+02:00	Ajayi 23'; Walid 62'		El Sheikh 71' (pen.); Antwi 74'

16 June 2017 31	Smouha	2-4	Al Ahly	Borg El Arab Stadium, Alexandria
22:00 UTC+02:00	Mohareb 25'; Farid 76' (pen.)		Saleh 15' 69'; Mo'men 32'; Rabia 89'

24 June 2017 32	Al Ahly	2-2	Enppi	El Salam Stadium, Cairo
22:00 UTC+02:00	Hamoudi 45+3'; Saleh 66'		Mar'ey 46'; Magdy 55'

27 June 2017 33	Al Masry	1-1	Al Ahly	Borg El Arab Stadium, Alexandria
19:00 UTC+02:00	El Shamy 79'		Saleh 87'

17 July 2017 34	Al Ahly	2-0	Zamalek	Borg El Arab Stadium, Alexandria
20:00 UTC+02:00	Walid 41'; Ajayi 89'

== 2017 Egypt Cup ==
=== Round 32 ===
22 December 2016	Al Ahly	6–0	Aluminium	El Salam Stadium, Cairo
20:00 UTC+02:00	Gamal 14', 51'; Mo'men 23'; Meteab 65', 85', 86'			Referee: Mohamed Saber

=== Round of 16 ===
1 March 2017	Al Ahly	2–1	El Dakhleya	Petro Sport Stadium, Cairo
19:00 UTC+02:00	Gamal 34'; Ghaly 49'		Fagar 63'	Referee: Ahmed El Ghandour

=== Quarter-final ===
12 July 2017	Al Ahly	4-1	Wadi Degla	El Salam Stadium, Cairo
19:00 UTC+02:00	Saleh 29' (pen.) 77' (pen.); Mo'men 88'; Meteab 90+2'		Anwar 25'

=== Semi-final ===
9 August 2017	Smouha	0–4	Al Ahly	Borg El Arab Stadium, Alexandria
20:00 UTC+02:00			Ajayi 38'; Walid 40', 55'; Saleh 67'	Referee: Mahmoud Al Banna

== Final ==
15 August 2017
20:00 CAT

Al Ahly	2–1 (a.e.t.)	Al Masry
Gamal 117'; Fathy 120+2'	Report	Bika 102'

Borg El Arab Stadium, Alexandria
Referee: Svein Oddvar Moen (Norway)

Al-Ahly	Al Masry

GK	1	(Egypt) Sherif Ekramy
CB	3	(Egypt) Ramy Rabia
CB	23	(Egypt) Mohamed Nagieb
RB	24	(Egypt) Ahmed Fathy
LB	21	(Tunisia) Ali Maâloul
CM	25	(Egypt) Hossam Ashour (c)		(substituted off) 106'
CM	17	(Egypt) Amr Al Sulaya
AM	19	(Egypt) Abdallah Said
RW	11	(Egypt) Walid Soliman		(substituted off) 64'
LW	8	(Egypt) Moamen Zakaria		(substituted off) 100'
CF	28	(Nigeria) Junior Ajayi	(yellow card) 68'
Substitutes:
GK	13	(Egypt) Ahmed Adel
DF	30	(Egypt) Mohamed Hany
MF	14	(Egypt) Hossam Ghaly
MF	22	(Egypt) Saleh Gomaa		(substituted on) 68'
FW	4	(Egypt) Ahmed Hamoudi		(substituted on) 100'
FW	9	(Egypt) Amr Gamal		(substituted on) 106'
FW	10	(Egypt) Emad Moteab
Manager:
(Egypt) Hossam El Badry

GK	26	(Egypt) Ahmed Buska
CB	3	(Egypt) Islam Salah
CB	13	(Egypt) Ahmed Ayman (c)		(substituted off) 52'
RB	19	(Egypt) Karim El Iraqy
LB	45	(Egypt) Mohamed Hamdy
CM	8	(Egypt) Amr Moussa
CM	5	(Egypt) Farid Shawky	(yellow card) 115'
AM	18	(Egypt) Mohamed El Shamy
RF	10	(Egypt) Ahmed Gomaa
CF	29	(Egypt) Hamada Nasser		(substituted off) 90+1'
LF	15	(Egypt) Abdallah Gomaa
Substitutes:
GK	1	(Egypt) Ahmed Abdel Fattah
DF	46	(Egypt) Hossam Ashraf
DF	24	(Egypt) Islam Saleh
MF	4	(Egypt) Ahmed Kaboria		(substituted on) 90+1'
MF	14	(Egypt) Abdallah Bika	(yellow card) 57'	(substituted on) 52'
FW	20	(Egypt) Ahmed Salem
FW	37	(Egypt) Hossam Attiya
Manager:
(Egypt) Hossam Hassan

- Assistant referees:
- Magnus Lindberg (Norway)
- Kim Thomas (Norway)
- Fourth official:
- Badawy Hemida (Egypt)

== 2017 CAF Champions League ==
=== First round ===
Team 1	Agg.	Team 2	1st leg	2nd leg
Al Ahly (Egypt)	1–0	(South Africa) Bidvest Wits	1–0	0–0

11 March 2017	Al Ahly (Egypt)	1–0	(South Africa) Bidvest Wits	El Salam Stadium, Cairo
18:30 UTC+2	Hegazy 56'	Report		Attendance: 7,000; Referee: Rédouane Jiyed (Morocco)

19 March 2017	Bidvest Wits (South Africa)	0–0	(Egypt) Al Ahly	Bidvest Stadium, Johannesburg
15:30 UTC+2		Report		Referee: Hélder Martins de Carvalho (Angola)

Al Ahly won 1–0 on aggregate.

=== Group stage ===
==== Group D ====
Pos	Team	Pld	W	D	L	GF	GA	GD	Pts	Qualification	WAC	AHL	ZAN	COT
1	(Morocco) Wydad AC	6	4	0	2	7	3	+4	12	Quarter-finals	—	2–0	1–0	2–0
2	(Egypt) Al Ahly	6	3	2	1	7	3	+4	11 (Note: Head-to-head results: Al-Ahly 0–0 Zanaco, Zanaco 0–0 Al-Ahly (tied on head-to-head results, ranked on total goal difference).)	Quarter-finals	2–0	—	0–0	3–1
3	(Zambia) Zanaco	6	3	2	1	4	2	+2	11		1–0	0–0	—	2–1
4	(Cameroon) Coton Sport	6	0	0	6	2	12	−10	0		0–2	0–2	0–1	—

Source: CAF
Notes:

13 May 2017	Al Ahly (Egypt)	0–0	(Zambia) Zanaco	Borg El Arab Stadium, Alexandria
19:00 UTC+2		Report		Referee: Bakary Gassama (Gambia)

23 May 2017	Coton Sport (Cameroon)	0–2	(Egypt) Al Ahly	Roumdé Adjia Stadium, Garoua
16:00 UTC+1		Report	Ajayi 12'; Mo'men 14'	Referee: Victor Gomes (South Africa)

4 June 2017	Al Ahly (Egypt)	2–0	(Morocco) Wydad Casablanca	Borg El Arab Stadium, Alexandria
23:00 UTC+2	Mo'men 24'; Ajayi 77'	Report		Attendance: 10,000; Referee: Youssef Essrayri (Tunisia)

20 June 2017	Wydad Casablanca (Morocco)	2–0	(Egypt) Al Ahly	Stade Mohamed V, Casablanca
23:00 UTC+0	Ondama 47'; El Karti 77'	Report		Referee: Mehdi Abid Charef (Algeria)

1 July 2017	Zanaco (Zambia)	0–0	(Egypt) Al Ahly	National Heroes Stadium, Lusaka
15:00 UTC+2		Report		Referee: Ali Lemghaifry (Mauritania)

8 July 2017	Al Ahly (Egypt)	3–1	(Cameroon) Coton Sport	Borg El Arab Stadium, Alexandria
21:00 UTC+2	Gamal 14', 53'; Said 33'	Report	Kombous 12'	Attendance: 25,000; Referee: Ferdinand Udoh (Nigeria)

== 2017 Arab Club Championship ==
- Times listed are UTC+2

=== Group stage ===
==== Group A ====
Pos	Team	Pld	W	D	L	GF	GA	GD	Pts	Qualification
1	(Jordan) Al-Faisaly	3	3	0	0	4	1	+3	9	Advance to knockout stage
2	(Egypt) Al-Ahly	3	2	0	1	4	2	+2	6	Advance to knockout stage
3	(Algeria) NA Hussein Dey	3	1	0	2	3	3	0	3	
4	(United Arab Emirates) Al-Wahda	3	0	0	3	1	6	−5	0	

Source: Soccerway

Ranking of second-placed teams
The highest ranked second-placed team from the groups advanced to the knockout stage; the rest were eliminated.

Pos	Grp	Team	Pld	W	D	L	GF	GA	GD	Pts	Qualification
1	A	(Egypt) Al-Ahly	3	2	0	1	4	2	+2	6	Advance to knockout stage
2	B	(Lebanon) Al-Ahed	3	1	2	0	3	2	+1	5	
3	C	(Sudan) Al-Merrikh	3	1	1	1	3	4	−1	4	

Source: Soccerway

22 July 2017	Al Ahly (Egypt)	0–1	(Jordan) Al Faisaly	El Salam Stadium, Cairo
21:15			Al-Rawashdeh 55'	Attendance: 10,000; Referee: Nawaf Abdulla Ghayyath Shukralla (Bahrain)

25 July 2017	Al-Wahda (United Arab Emirates)	0–2	(Egypt) Al Ahly	El Salam Stadium, Cairo
21:00			Barakat 32'; Mohareb 84'	Attendance: 6,000; Referee: Youssef Essrayri (Tunisia)

28 July 2017	Al Ahly (Egypt)	2–1	(Algeria) NA Hussein Dey	El Salam Stadium, Cairo
21:00	Saleh 74' (pen.); Barakat 90+2'		Boulaouidet 61'	Attendance: 13,000; Referee: Ali Sabah (Iraq)

=== Semi-final ===
2 August 2017	Al Ahly (Egypt)	1–2	(Jordan) Al Faisaly	Borg El Arab Stadium, Alexandria
20:00	Azaro 90+8'		Mendy 26'; Fathy 37' (o.g.)	Referee: Ali Lemghaifry (Mauritania)
