= 2014–15 Al Ahly SC season =

2014–15 season
- Chairman: Mahmoud Taher
- Manager: Juan Carlos Garrido succeeded by Fathi Mabrouk
- 2014–15 Egyptian League: Runner-up
- 2014 CAF Confederation Cup: Champion
- 2014 Egyptian Super Cup: Champion
- 2015 Egypt Cup: Runner-up
- 2015 CAF Super Cup: Runner-up
- 2015 CAF Champions League: Round 16 (transferred to Confederations Cup)
- 2015 CAF Confederation Cup: Semi-final
| Home colours | Away colours |

The 2014-2015 season of the Al Ahly football club.

== 2014 CAF Confederation Cup ==
=== Group stage ===
==== Group B ====
| Team | Pld | W | D | L | GF | GA | GD | Pts | AHL | SEW | NKA | ESS |
|---|---|---|---|---|---|---|---|---|---|---|---|---|
| (Egypt) Al-Ahly | 6 | 2 | 3 | 1 | 5 | 3 | +2 | 9 (Note: Tiebreakers: Al-Ahly and Séwé Sport are ranked on head-to-head record.) | | 1–0 | 2–0 | 0–0 |
| (Ivory Coast) Séwé Sport | 6 | 2 | 3 | 1 | 7 | 4 | +3 | 9 | 1–1 | | 3–0 | 1–1 |
| (Zambia) Nkana | 6 | 2 | 1 | 3 | 9 | 13 | −4 | 7 | 1–0 | 1–1 | | 4–3 |
| (Tunisia) Étoile du Sahel | 6 | 1 | 3 | 2 | 9 | 10 | −1 | 6 | 1–1 | 0–1 | 4–3 | |

Notes:

| 26 July 2014 | Al-Ahly (Egypt) | 1–0 | (Ivory Coast) Séwé Sport | 30 June Stadium, Cairo |
| 21:30 UTC+2 | Soliman 4' (pen.) | | | Referee: Mahamadou Keita (Mali) |

| 9 August 2014 | Nkana (Zambia) | 1–0 | (Egypt) Al-Ahly | Nkana Stadium, Kitwe |
| 15:00 UTC+2 | Mwanza 51' (pen.) | | | Referee: Bernard Camille (Seychelles) |

| 23 August 2014 | Al-Ahly (Egypt) | 0–0 | (Tunisia) Étoile du Sahel | Cairo International Stadium, Cairo |
| 18:00 UTC+3 | | | | Referee: Koman Coulibaly (Mali) |

Note: Al Ahly's season end in beginning of July; the first half of the 2014 CAF Confederation Cup group stage matches were held in the previous season, as the competition was suspended by the beginning of June, as not to overlap with the 2014 FIFA World Cup

=== Semi-final ===
| Team 1 | Agg. | Team 2 | 1st leg | 2nd leg |
|---|---|---|---|---|
| Coton Sport (Cameroon) | 1–3 | (Egypt) Al-Ahly | 0–1 | 1–2 |

| 20 September 2014 | Coton Sport (Cameroon) | 0–1 | (Egypt) Al-Ahly | Roumdé Adjia Stadium, Garoua |
| 16:00 UTC+1 | | Report (CAF); Report | Soliman 72' | Referee: Juste Ephrem Zio (Burkina Faso) |

| 28 September 2014 | Al-Ahly (Egypt) | 2–1 | (Cameroon) Coton Sport | Cairo International Stadium, Cairo |
| 19:00 UTC+2 | Yedan 41'; Gamal 78' | Report (CAF); Report | Kombous 14' | Referee: Janny Sikazwe (Zambia) |

=== Final ===
In the final, the order of legs was decided by a draw, held after the group stage draw (29 April 2014, 11:00 UTC+2, at the CAF Headquarters in Cairo, Egypt).

| Team 1 | Agg. | Team 2 | 1st leg | 2nd leg |
|---|---|---|---|---|
| Séwé Sport (Ivory Coast) | 2–2 (a) | (Egypt) Al-Ahly | 2–1 | 0–1 |

| 29 November 2014 | Séwé Sport (Ivory Coast) | 2–1 | (Egypt) Al-Ahly | Stade Robert Champroux, Abidjan |
| 15:00 UTC±0 | Kouamé 24' (pen.); Assalé 81' | Report | Trezeguet 59' | Attendance: 5,000; Referee: Eric Otogo-Castane (Gabon) |

| 6 December 2014 | Al-Ahly (Egypt) | 1–0 | (Ivory Coast) Séwé Sport | Cairo International Stadium, Cairo |
| 18:00 UTC+2 | Meteab 96' | Report (CAF) | | Referee: Rajindraparsad Seechurn (Mauritius) |

2014 CAF Confedetation Cup winners
(Egypt)
Al Ahly
First title

== 2014 Egyptian Super Cup ==
| 14 September 2014 | Al Ahly | 0–0 (5–4 p) | Zamalek | Cairo International Stadium, Cairo |
| 20:00 UTC+3 | | | | Attendance: 200; Referee: Mohamed Farouk (Egypt) |
| | Penalties |
| | Abdelzaher (penalty missed); Soliman (penalty missed); Nagieb (penalty scored); Basem (penalty scored); Saad (penalty scored); Raheel (penalty scored); Rizk (penalty scored) | | (penalty scored) Abdelshafy; (penalty scored) Kamar; (penalty missed) Samir; (penalty scored) Gaber; (penalty missed) Koffi; (penalty scored) Tawfik; (penalty missed) Salah |

2014 Egyptian Super Cup winners
(Egypt)
Al Ahly
Eighth title

== 2014-15 Egyptian Premier League ==
=== Position ===
| Pos | Team | Pld | W | D | L | GF | GA | GD | Pts | Qualification or relegation |
|---|---|---|---|---|---|---|---|---|---|---|
| 1 | Zamalek (C) | 38 | 26 | 9 | 3 | 69 | 21 | +48 | 87 | Qualification for the Champions League |
| 2 | Al Ahly | 38 | 23 | 10 | 5 | 65 | 26 | +39 | 79 | Qualification for the Champions League |
| 3 | ENPPI | 38 | 18 | 16 | 4 | 65 | 29 | +36 | 70 | Qualification for the Confederation Cup (Note: Since the winners of the 2015 Egypt Cup, Zamalek, qualified for African competition based on league position, the spot awarded to the Cup winner (Confederation Cup) was passed to the fourth-placed team which were the next best teams in the table not already qualified for any African competition.) |

Source: Soccerway
Rules for classification: 1) Points; 2) Goal difference; 3) Goals scored.
(C) Champion

=== Results ===
==== Results table ====
| Home \ Away | AHL | DMN | ASS | DKH | ENP | HRS | ISM | ITH | GOU | MAS | MMK | MOK | NAS | PET | ITS | RAJ | SMO | TGS | WDG | ZAM |
|---|---|---|---|---|---|---|---|---|---|---|---|---|---|---|---|---|---|---|---|---|
| Al Ahly | — | 4–2 | 5–0 | 2–0 | 1–1 | 3–0 | 0–0 | 1–4 | 1–1 | 2–0 | 1–0 | 0–1 | 2–1 | 1–1 | 3–0 | 2–1 | 1–1 | 4–0 | 3–1 | 2–0 |
| Ala'ab Damanhour | 2–1 | — | | | | | | | | | | | | | | | | | | |
| Al Assiouty Sport | 0–0 | | — | | | | | | | | | | | | | | | | | |
| El Dakhleya | 1–0 | | | — | | | | | | | | | | | | | | | | |
| ENPPI | 0–1 | | | | — | | | | | | | | | | | | | | | |
| Haras El Hodoud | 0–1 | | | | | — | | | | | | | | | | | | | | |
| Ismaily | 1–1 | | | | | | — | | | | | | | | | | | | | |
| Al Ittihad | 1–0 | | | | | | | — | | | | | | | | | | | | |
| El Gouna | 2–0 | | | | | | | | — | | | | | | | | | | | |
| Al Masry | 1–1 | | | | | | | | | — | | | | | | | | | | |
| Misr Lel Makkasa | 2–0 | | | | | | | | | | — | | | | | | | | | |
| Al Mokawloon | 1–0 | | | | | | | | | | | — | | | | | | | | |
| Al Nasr | 3–0 | | | | | | | | | | | | — | | | | | | | |
| Petrojet | 2–1 | | | | | | | | | | | | | — | | | | | | |
| Ittihad El Shorta | 3–1 | | | | | | | | | | | | | | — | | | | | |
| El Raja | 1–2 | | | | | | | | | | | | | | | — | | | | |
| Smouha | 3–1 | | | | | | | | | | | | | | | | — | | | |
| Tala'ea El Gaish | 3–1 | | | | | | | | | | | | | | | | | — | | |
| Wadi Degla | 0–0 | | | | | | | | | | | | | | | | | | — | |
| Zamalek | 1–1 | | | | | | | | | | | | | | | | | | | — |

Updated to match(es) played on 2 August 2015. Source: fifa.com
Legend: Blue = home team win; Yellow = draw; Red = away team win.

==== Match details ====
| 18 October 2014 1 | Al Ahly | 3-0 | El Shorta | Cairo International Stadium, Cairo |
| 19:00 UTC+02:00 | Amr 14'; Touré 41' (o.g.); Walid 66' | report |

| 20 December 2014 2 | Wadi Degla | 0-0 | Al Ahly | 30 June Stadium, Cairo |
| 19:30 UTC+02:00 |

| 24 December 2014 3 | Al Ahly | 1-4 | Al Ittihad Al Sakandary | Cairo International Stadium, Cairo |
| 19:00 UTC+02:00 | Saido 90+2' | | Oukri 3'; Hamdy 45+1'; Felix 75'; Ramy 82' |

| 2 October 2014 4 | El Ragaa | 2-1 | Al Ahly | Alexandria Stadium, Alexandria |
| 17:15 UTC+02:00 | Mounofi 74'; Tarek 90' | report | Meteab 79' |

| 22 October 2014 5 | Al Ahly | 0-0 | Ismaily | El Gouna Stadium, El Gouna |
| 15:00 UTC+02:00 |

| 27 October 2014 6 | Al Assiouty | 0-0 | Al Ahly | Assiut Cement Stadium, Assiut |
| 15:00 UTC+02:00 |

| 1 November 2014 7 | Al Ahly | 4-2 | Damanhour | Cairo International Stadium, Cairo |
| 19:30 UTC+02:00 | Meteab 31' 81' 90+1'; Rizk 50' | | Fathi 38'; Kone 58' |

| 5 November 2014 8 | Al Mokawloon Al Arab | 0-1 | Al Ahly | Osman Ahmed Osman Stadium, Cairo |
| 17:00 UTC+02:00 | | | Bambo 85' |

| 23 November 2014 9 | Al Ahly | 2-1 | Al Nasr | Cairo International Stadium, Cairo |
| 19:30 UTC+02:00 | Meteab 85' (pen.); Ramadan 90+6' | | Zizo 45' |

| 24 January 2015 10 | Tala'ea El Geish | 1-3 | Al Ahly | 30 June Stadium, Cairo |
| 16:30 UTC+02:00 | Kamal 29' | | Meteab 30' 49' (pen.); Abdallah 40' |

| 1 June 2015 11 | Al Ahly | 2-0 | El Dakhleya | Petro Sport Stadium, Cairo |
| 19:00 UTC+03:00 | Meteab 78'; Saido 88' |

| 11 December 2014 12 | Smouha | 1-3 | Al Ahly | Alexandria Stadium, Alexandria |
| 19:00 UTC+02:00 | Shokry 17' | | Zaher 59'; Meteab 75'; Trezeguet 84' |

| 15 December 2014 13 | Al Ahly | 3-0 | Haras El Hedoud | Cairo International Stadium, Cairo |
| 19:30 UTC+02:00 | Zaher 21'; Walid 82'; Trezeguet 90+4' |

| 10 January 2015 14 | Al Masry | 1-1 | Al Ahly | El Gouna Stadium, El Gouna |
| 14:30 UTC+02:00 | Abdel-Hakim 56' | | Ramadan 80' |

| 28 December 2014 15 | Al Ahly | 1-0 | Misr El Makasa | Cairo International Stadium, Cairo |
| 19:30 UTC+02:00 | Zaher 33' |

| 3 January 2015 16 | El Gouna | 0-2 | Al Ahly | El Gouna Stadium, El Gouna |
| 14:30 UTC+02:00 | Hussein 16'; Meteab 90+5' |

| 20 January 2015 17 | Al Ahly | 1-1 | Petrojet | Cairo International Stadium, Cairo |
| 19:30 UTC+02:00 | Saad 47' | | Bekele 54' |

| 29 January 2015 18 | Zamalek | 1-1 | Al Ahly | 30 June Stadium, Cairo |
| 18:00 UTC+02:00 | Hefny 31' | | Walid 34' |

| 3 February 19 | Enppi | 1-0 | Al Ahly | Osman Ahmed Osman Stadium, Cairo |
| 18:00 UTC+02:00 | Qa'oud 74' |

| 7 February 2015 20 | El Shorta | 1-3 | Al Ahly | Osman Ahmed Osman Stadium, Cairo |
| 17:00 UTC+02:00 | Poku 61' | | Ebimobowei 39'; Walid 80' 89' |

| 2 July 2015 21 | Al Ahly | 3-1 | Wadi Degla | Petro Sport Stadium, Cairo |
| 22:00 UTC+02:00 | Ramadan 13'; Amr 45'; Meteab 90' | | Stanley 77' |

| 28 May 2015 22 | Al Ittihad Al Sakandary | 0-1 | Al Ahly | Alexandria Stadium, Alexandria |
| 16:00 UTC+02:00 | | | Ramadan 90+3' |

| 31 March 2015 23 | Al Ahly | 2-1 | El Ragaa | Petro Sport Stadium, Cairo |
| 16:30 UTC+02:00 | Ebimobowei 11'; Saido 84' | | Amir 35' |

| 8 April 2015 24 | Ismaily | 1-1 | Al Ahly | El Gouna Stadium, El Gouna |
| 15:30 UTC+02:00 | Mo'men 84' | | Saad 45' (o.g.) |

| 13 April 2015 25 | Al Ahly | 5-0 | Al Assiuty | Petro Sport Stadium, Cairo |
| 16:00 UTC+02:00 | Walid 14'; Mo'men 32' 37'; Saido 41'; Abdallah 70' |

| 23 April 2015 26 | Damanhour | 1-2 | Al Ahly | Damanhour Stadium, Damanhour |
| 15:00 UTC+02:00 | Afroto 16' | | Ebimobowei 87'; Abdallah 90' |

| 27 April 2015 27 | Al Ahly | 0-1 | Al Mokawloon Al Arab | Petro Sport Stadium, Cairo |
| 17:30 UTC+02:00 | | | Salem 79' |

| 6 May 2015 28 | Al Nasr | 0-3 | Al Ahly | Petro Sport Stadium, Cairo |
| 18:30 UTC+02:00 | | | Trezeguet 15' 26'; Mo'men 33' |

| 10 May 2015 29 | Al Ahly | 4-0 | Tala'ea El Geish | Petro Sport Stadium, Cairo |
| 18:30 UTC+02:00 | Abdallah 6'; Trezeguet 21'; Meteab 83'; Gedo 87' |

| 13 May 2015 30 | El Dakhleya | 0-1 | Al Ahly | Petro Sport Stadium, Cairo |
| 18:30 UTC+02:00 | | | Ramadan 77' |

| 28 July 2015 31 | Al Ahly | 1-1 | Smouha | Petro Sport Stadium, Cairo |
| 19:30 UTC+02:00 | Abdallah 83' (pen.) | | Hany 50' (o.g.) |

| 24 May 2015 32 | Haras El Hedoud | 1-0 | Al Ahly | Borg El Arab Stadium, Alexandria |
| 18:00 UTC+02:00 | Mekky 27' |

| 6 July 2015 33 | Al Ahly | 2-0 | Al Masry | El Gouna Stadium, El Gouna |
| 21:30 UTC+02:00 | Mo'men 9'; Abdallah 20' (pen.) |

| 17 June 2015 34 | Misr El Makasa | 0-2 | Al Ahly | Egyptian Military Stadium, Suez |
| 17:30 UTC+02:00 | | | Zaher 70'; Islam 84' |

| 20 June 2015 35 | Al Ahly | 1-1 | El Gouna | Petro Sport Stadium, Cairo |
| 21:30 UTC+02:00 | Islam 22' | | Mohareb 65' |

| 23 June 2015 36 | Petrojet | 1-2 | Al Ahly | Egyptian Military Stadium, Suez |
| 21:30 UTC+02:00 | Bekele 9' | | Walid 45+2'; Magdi 79' (o.g.) |

| 21 July 2015 37 | Al Ahly | 2-0 | Zamalek | Borg El Arab Stadium, Alexandria |
| 20:00 UTC+02:00 | Mo'men 32' 81' |

| 2 August 2015 38 | Al Ahly | 1-1 | Enppi | Petro Sport Stadium, Cairo |
| 19:30 UTC+02:00 | Amr 90+2' | | Soliman 88' |

== 2015 Egypt Cup ==
=== Round 32 ===
| 15 January 2015 | Al Ahly | 6-1 | Tahta F.C. | Cairo |
| 17:30 UTC+02:00 | Walid 23'; Abdallah 26'; Naguib 36'; Roshdy 39'; Meteab 67' (pen.) 69' | | Ra'fat 45+3' | Stadium: Cairo International Stadium |

=== Round 16 ===
| 13 August 2015 | Al Ahly | 13-0 | El Gouna | Cairo |
| 20:00 UTC+02:00 | Shams 6' (o.g.); Abdallah 10' (pen.) 12'; Antwi 18' 27' 79' 82' (pen.); Ramadan 49'; Fathy 52'; Evouna 55'; Geddo 60'; Hussein 66'; Ghaly 86' | | | Stadium: Petro Sport Stadium |

=== Quarter-final ===
| 16 August 2015 | Al Ahly | 5-0 | El Shorta | Cairo |
| 19:30 UTC+02:00 | Abdallah 30'; Ramadan 34'; Mo'men 39'; Meteab 71' 88' | | | Stadium: Petro Sport Stadium |

=== Semi-final ===
| 16 September 2015 | Al Ahly | 3-1 | Petrojet | Cairo |
| 19:00 UTC+02:00 | Ramadan 42'; Hussein 71'; Fathy 88' | | Ragab 24' | Stadium: Petro Sport Stadium |

=== Final ===
| 21 September 2015 | Al Ahly | 0-2 | Zamalek | Cairo |
| 19:00 UTC+02:00 | | | Basem 11' 33' | Stadium: Petro Sport Stadium |

== 2015 CAF Super Cup ==
| 21 February 2015 | ES Sétif (Algeria) | 1–1 (6–5 p) | (Egypt) Al Ahly | Stade Mustapha Tchaker, Blida |
| 16:00 UTC+1 | Ziaya 68' | Report | Meteab 90+4' | Attendance: 15,000; Referee: Noumandiez Doué (Ivory Coast) |
| | Penalties |
| | Delhoum (penalty scored); Mellouli (penalty scored); Benyettou (penalty scored); Dagoulou (penalty scored); Belameiri (penalty scored); Lamri (penalty scored) | | (penalty scored) Mo'men; (penalty scored) Said; (penalty scored) Meteab; (penalty scored) Saad; (penalty scored) Trezeguet; (penalty missed) Basem |

== 2015 CAF Champions League ==
=== Round 32 ===
| Team 1 | Agg. | Team 2 | 1st leg | 2nd leg |
|---|---|---|---|---|
| APR (Rwanda) | 0–4 | (Egypt) Al Ahly | 0–2 | 0–2 |

| 14 March 2015 | APR (Rwanda) | 0–2 | (Egypt) Al Ahly | Amahoro Stadium, Kigali |
| 15:30 UTC+2 | | Report | Meteab 65'; Walid 83' | Referee: Janny Sikazwe (Zambia) |

| 4 April 2015 | Al Ahly (Egypt) | 2–0 | (Rwanda) APR | Petro Sport Stadium, Cairo |
| 19:00 UTC+2 | Mo'men 31', 48' | Report | | Referee: Luelseghed Ghebremichael (Eritrea) |

Al Ahly won 4–0 on aggregate and advanced to the second round.

=== Round 16 ===
| Team 1 | Agg. | Team 2 | 1st leg | 2nd leg |
|---|---|---|---|---|
| Moghreb Tétouan (Morocco) | 1–1 (4–3 p) | (Egypt) Al Ahly | 1–0 | 0–1 |

| 19 April 2015 | Moghreb Tétouan (Morocco) | 1–0 | (Egypt) Al Ahly | Saniat Rmel, Tétouan |
| 20:30 UTC+1 | Iajour 90+1' | Report | | Referee: Bakary Gassama (Gambia) |

| 2 May 2015 | Al Ahly (Egypt) | 1–0 (3–4 p) | (Morocco) Moghreb Tétouan | Petro Sport Stadium, Cairo |
| 19:00 UTC+2 | Said 42' | Report | | Referee: Eric Otogo-Castane (Gabon) |

1–1 on aggregate. Moghreb Tétouan won the penalty shoot-out and advanced to the group stage. Al Ahly entered the Confederation Cup play-off round.

== 2015 CAF Confederation Cup ==
=== Play-off Round ===
| Team 1 | Agg. | Team 2 | 1st leg | 2nd leg |
|---|---|---|---|---|
| Al Ahly (Egypt) | 3–3 (5–4 p) | (Tunisia) Club Africain | 2–1 | 1–2 |

| 17 May 2015 | Al Ahly (Egypt) | 2–1 | (Tunisia) Club Africain | Suez Stadium, Suez |
| 19:00 UTC+02:00 | Abd El-Zaher 45'; Moteab 65' | Report | Meniaoui 36' | Referee: Bamlak Tessema Weyesa (Ethiopia) |

| 7 June 2015 | Club Africain (Tunisia) | 2–1 (4–5 p) | (Egypt) Al Ahly | Stade Olympique de Radès, Radès |
| 18:00 UTC+1 | Dhaouadi 7'; Ghandri 90+7' | Report | Meteab 60' | Referee: Mehdi Abid Charef (Algeria) |
| | Penalties |
| | Belaïd (penalty scored); Ifa (penalty scored); Dhaouadi (penalty scored); Agrebi (penalty missed); Mikari (penalty scored); Meniaoui (penalty missed); Jaziri (penalty missed) | | (penalty scored) Said; (penalty scored) Soliman; (penalty scored) Ashour; (penalty missed) Nagieb; (penalty scored) Samir; (penalty missed) Raheel; (penalty scored) Sobhy |

3–3 on aggregate. Al Ahly won the penalty shoot-out and advanced to the group stage.

=== Group stage ===
==== Group A ====
| Pos | Team | Pld | W | D | L | GF | GA | GD | Pts | Qualification | AHL | ESS | STA | EST |
|---|---|---|---|---|---|---|---|---|---|---|---|---|---|---|
| 1 | (Egypt) Al-Ahly | 6 | 4 | 1 | 1 | 6 | 1 | +5 | 13 | Advance to knockout stage | — | 1–0 | 1–0 | 3–0 |
| 2 | (Tunisia) Étoile du Sahel | 6 | 4 | 1 | 1 | 6 | 3 | +3 | 13 | Advance to knockout stage | 1–0 | — | 1–0 | 2–1 |
| 3 | (Mali) Stade Malien | 6 | 1 | 2 | 3 | 3 | 5 | −2 | 5 | | 0–0 | 1–1 | — | 0–1 |
| 4 | (Tunisia) Espérance de Tunis | 6 | 1 | 0 | 5 | 3 | 9 | −6 | 3 | | 0–1 | 0–1 | 1–2 | — |

Source: CAF
Rules for classification: Group stage tiebreakers

| 28 June 2015 | Al Ahly (Egypt) | 3–0 | (Tunisia) Espérance de Tunis | Suez Stadium, Suez |
| 22:00 UTC+2 | Said 19', 58'; Zakaria 90+4' | Report | | Referee: Néant Alioum (Cameroon) |

| 12 July 2015 | Stade Malien (Mali) | 0–0 | (Egypt) Al Ahly | Stade Modibo Kéïta, Bamako |
| 16:30 UTC±0 | | Report | | Referee: Thierry Nkurunziza (Burundi) |

| 25 July 2015 | Al Ahly (Egypt) | 1–0 | (Tunisia) Étoile du Sahel | Suez Stadium, Suez |
| 19:00 UTC+2 | Walid 37' | Report | | Referee: Malang Diedhiou (Senegal) |

| 8 August 2015 | Étoile du Sahel (Tunisia) | 1–0 | (Egypt) Al-Ahly | Stade Olympique de Sousse, Sousse |
| 21:00 UTC+1 | Mouihbi 26' (pen.) | Report | | Referee: Bouchaïb El Ahrach (Morocco) |

| 22 August 2015 | Espérance de Tunis (Tunisia) | 0–1 | (Egypt) Al-Ahly | Stade Olympique de Radès, Radès |
| 19:00 UTC+1 | | Report | Antwi 6' | Referee: Hamada Nampiandraza (Madagascar) |

| 12 September 2015 | Al-Ahly (Egypt) | 1–0 | (Mali) Stade Malien | Suez Stadium, Suez |
| 20:30 UTC+2 | Gamal 75' | Report | | Referee: El Fadil Mohamed (Sudan) |
