= 2016 Egypt Cup final =

- Event: 2016 Egypt Cup
Zamalek	Al Ahly
3	1
- Date: 8 August 2016
- Venue: Borg El Arab Stadium, Alexandria
- Referee: Andó-Szabó Sándor (Hungary)
- Weather: Clear; 27 °C (81 °F); 79% humidity

The 2016 Egypt Cup final decided the winner of the 2016 Egypt Cup, the 84th season of Egypt's premier knockout football cup competition. It was played on 8 August 2016 at Borg El Arab Stadium in Alexandria.

Zamalek, who have won the three previous finals, faced Al Ahly, the record-title holders who last won in 2007. Zamalek won the match 3–1 to secure their 4th consecutive and 25th overall title.

As Zamalek won the Cup, they will play against the 2015–16 Egyptian Premier League winner Al Ahly in the 2016 Egyptian Super Cup. Because both Zamalek and Al Ahly qualified for the Champions League, the spot awarded to the Cup winner (Confederation Cup) is passed to the fourth-placed team which were the next best teams in the table not already qualified for any African competition.

== Route to the final ==
The Egypt Cup is a thirty-two team single-elimination knockout cup competition. There are a total of four rounds leading up to the final. Teams are drawn against each other in pots, and the winner after 90 minutes advances. If still tied, extra time, and if necessary penalties are used to determine the winner.

Zamalek		Round	Al Ahly
Opponent	Result	2016 Egypt Cup	Opponent	Result
Shabab El Daba'a	2–0	Round of 32	Dayrout	3–0
Ittihad El Shorta	2–1	Round of 16	Haras El Hodoud	2–1
Al Ittihad	2–1	Quarter-finals	Smouha	1–0
Ismaily	4–0	Semi-finals	ENPPI	2–1

== Match ==
=== Details ===
Zamalek were the "home" team (for administrative purposes), as they played the first semi-final match.

8 August 2016
20:30 UTC+2

Zamalek	3–1	Al Ahly
Morsy 20', 25' (pen.); M. Fathi 59'	Report	Said 33' (pen.)

Borg El Arab Stadium, Alexandria
Referee: Andó-Szabó Sándor (Hungary)

Zamalek	Al Ahly

GK	1	(Egypt) Ahmed El Shenawy	(yellow card) 84'
RB	6	(Egypt) Shawky El Said
CB	7	(Egypt) Islam Gamal
CB	25	(Egypt) Ali Gabr
LB	27	(Egypt) Ali Fathy		(substituted off) 76'
DM	3	(Egypt) Tarek Hamed
CM	4	(Egypt) Ahmed Tawfik
CM	15	(Nigeria) Maarouf Youssef
RW	10	(Egypt) Mahmoud Shikabala (c)		(substituted off) 51'
LW	14	(Egypt) Ayman Hefny		(substituted off) 65'
FW	17	(Egypt) Basem Morsy	(yellow card) 7'
Substitutes:
GK	28	(Egypt) Omar Salah
DF	19	(Egypt) Ahmed Duiedar
DF	33	(Egypt) Osama Ibrahim
MF	11	(Egypt) Mohamed Nasef		(substituted in) 65'
MF	5	(Egypt) Ibrahim Salah		(substituted in) 76'
FW	9	(Egypt) Ahmed Gaafar
FW	30	(Egypt) Mostafa Fathi		(substituted in) 51'
Manager:
(Egypt) Moamen Soliman

GK	13	(Egypt) Ahmed Adel
RB	3	(Egypt) Ramy Rabia	(yellow card) 62'
CB	20	(Egypt) Saad Samir
LB	6	(Egypt) Sabri Raheel
DM	25	(Egypt) Hossam Ashour		(substituted off) 68'
RM	20	(Egypt) Ahmed Fathy	(yellow card) 88' (yellow-red card) 90+1'
CM	14	(Egypt) Hossam Ghaly (c)	(yellow card) 65' (yellow-red card) 83'
LM	11	(Egypt) Walid Soliman		(substituted off) 63'
AM	8	(Egypt) Moamen Zakaria
FW	9	(Egypt) Amr Gamal		(substituted off) 58'
FW	19	(Egypt) Abdallah Said
Substitutes:
GK	16	(Egypt) Mohamed El Shenawy
DF	21	(Tunisia) Ali Maâloul
DF	23	(Egypt) Mohamed Nagieb
DF	24	(Egypt) Mohamed Hany
MF	15	(Egypt) Mohamed Gaber		(substituted in) 68'
FW	4	(Egypt) Marwan Mohsen		(substituted in) 63'
FW	10	(Egypt) Emad Moteab		(substituted in) 58'
Manager:
(Netherlands) Martin Jol

- Assistant referees:
- Peter Berettyan (Hungary)
- Zsolt Varga (Hungary)
- Fourth official:
- Mohamed Maarouf (Egypt)

Match rules:

- 90 minutes.
- 30 minutes of extra time if necessary.
- Penalty shoot-out if scores still level.
- Seven named substitutes, of which up to three may be used.
