= Abdallah El Said =

Egyptian footballer (born 1985)

Abdallah El Said عبد الله السعيد
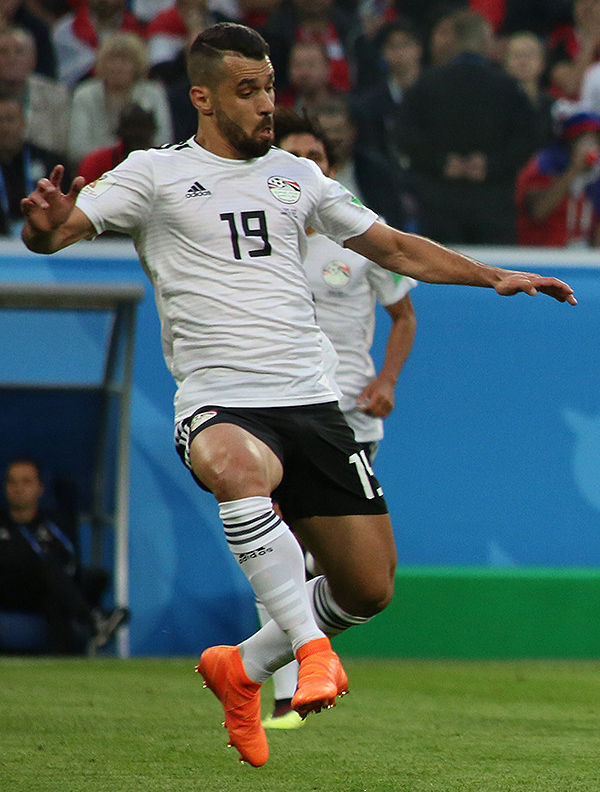
- El Said with Egypt at the 2018 FIFA World Cup

Personal information
- Full name: Abdallah Mahmoud Said Bekhit
- Date of birth: 13 July 1985 (age 41)
- Place of birth: Ismailia, Egypt
- Height: 1.76 m (5 ft 9 in)
- Position: Attacking midfielder

Team information
- Current team: Zamalek
- Number: 19

Youth career
- –2004: Ismaily

Senior career*
Years	Team	Apps	(Gls)
2004–2011	Ismaily	140	(36)
2011–2018	Al Ahly	154	(50)
2018	→ KuPS (loan)	7	(0)
2018	Al-Ahli	14	(2)
2019–2023	Pyramids	126	(36)
2024–	Zamalek	27	(7)

International career
2008–2022	Egypt	58	(6)
Medal record
Representing Egypt
Men's football
Africa Cup of Nations
Runner-up	2017 Gabon
Runner-up	2021 Cameroon
- * Club domestic league appearances and goals as of 17 January 2025

Abdallah Mahmoud Said Bekhit (Arabic: عبد الله محمود السعيد بخيت; born 13 July 1985) is an Egyptian professional footballer who plays as an attacking midfielder for Egyptian Premier League club Zamalek

== Club career ==
El Said agreed to a three-year contract extension with Ismaily in May 2007.

In 2011 after various problems with his team and due to Ismaily's need for money and after long negotiations, El Said signed with Al Ahly despite earlier reports assuring that he is going to sign with Zamalek due to Ismaily's bitter rivalry with Ahly.

El Said made his debut with Al Ahly against ENPPI, he scored 4 goals in his first season before it was cancelled due to the Egyptian Revolution of 2011.

With Al Ahly, El Said won the Egyptian Premier League: 2013–14, 2015–16, 2016–17, 2017–18 Egypt Cup: 2016–17 Egyptian Super Cup: 2011, 2015, 2017 CAF Champions League: 2012, 2013 CAF Confederation Cup: 2014, CAF Super Cup: 2013 and 2014.

In his last season with Al Ahly, El Said enjoyed an outstanding league campaign, consistently making an impact even when he was not at his best. In 21 league appearances, he recorded 10 goals and 11 assists. His consistency was particularly impressive: across 17 consecutive matches between November 2017 and February 2018, he contributed to a goal in 16 games, playing an important role in Al Ahly's pursuit of a third consecutive league title.

On 10 April 2018, El Said joined Finish side KuPS on loan for two months. Following the conclusion of the loan, he joined Saudi Arabian side Al-Ahli Saudi. In January 2019, El Said joined the Egyptian side Pyramids.

El Said played over a hundred games with Pyramids and was the Egyptian Premier League top goalscorer: 2019–20.

In January 2024, El said joined Zamalek. With Zamalek, he won the Egyptian Premier League: 2025–26, Egypt Cup: 2024–25 and CAF Super Cup: 2024.

== International career ==
Abdallah El Said made his Egypt debut in 2008 against Malawi under Hassan Shehata and went on to earn 58 international appearances. He was not part of Egypt's squad for the 2010 Africa Cup of Nations and only became a regular national-team selection several years later. Under Héctor Cúper, El Said became an important part of Egypt's team, scoring crucial goals during their successful qualification campaign for the 2018 FIFA World Cup, which ended a 28-year absence from the tournament.

In May 2018 he was named in Egypt's squad for the 2018 FIFA World Cup in Russia. He started all three of Egypt's group-stage matches in Russia and assisted Mohamed Salah's goal against Saudi Arabia.

El Said also played a major role in Egypt's run to the 2017 Africa Cup of Nations final, starting five of their six matches before Egypt lost to Cameroon. He remained involved with the national team for the 2019 and 2021 AFCON tournaments, with his final appearance coming against Sudan in 2021, when he assisted the winning goal. After 14 years representing Egypt, El Said announced his retirement from international football.

== Career statistics ==
=== Club ===
As of match played January 2025

Appearances and goals by club, season and competition
Club	Season	League			National cup (Note: Includes Egypt Cup)		Continental		Other		Total	
Club	Season	Division	Apps	Goals	Apps	Goals	Apps	Goals	Apps	Goals	Apps	Goals
Ismaily	2003–04	Egyptian Premier League	2	0	1	0	0	0	0	0	3	0
Ismaily	2004–05	Egyptian Premier League	3	0	0	0	0	0	—		2	0
Ismaily	2005–06	Egyptian Premier League	14	4	3	0	0	0	0	0	17	4
Ismaily	2006–07	Egyptian Premier League	24	7	3	0	0	0	0	0	27	7
Ismaily	2007–08	Egyptian Premier League	27	5	0	0	0	0	1	0	28	5
Ismaily	2008–09	Egyptian Premier League	29	9	0	0	1	0	0	0	30	9
Ismaily	2009–10	Egyptian Premier League	15	3	0	0	4 (Note: Appearances in CAF Champions League)	0	—		19	3
Ismaily	2010–11	Egyptian Premier League	26	8	1	0	0	0	—		27	8
Ismaily	Total		140	36	8	0	20	2	7	5	180	44
Al Ahly	2010–11	Egyptian Premier League	0	0	1	0	0	0	—		1	0
Al Ahly	2011–12	Egyptian Premier League	15	4	0	0	10	1	4 (Note: One appearance and one goal in Egyptian Super Cup, three appearances in FIFA Club World Cup)	1	29	6
Al Ahly	2012–13	Egyptian Premier League	14	0	0	0	10	2	3 (Note: One appearance in CAF Super Cup, two appearances in FIFA Club World Cup)	0	27	2
Al Ahly	2013–14	Egyptian Premier League	17	9	0	0	8	1	—		25	10
Al Ahly	2014–15	Egyptian Premier League	29	6	5	4	12	3	1 (Note: Appearance(s) in Egyptian Super Cup)	2	47	15
Al Ahly	2015–16	Egyptian Premier League	30	11	3	1	5	1	1 (Note: Appearance in CAF Super Cup)	0	39	13
Al Ahly	2016–17	Egyptian Premier League	28	10	2	0	11	2	1 (Note: Appearance in FIFA Club World Cup)	0	42	12
Al Ahly	2017–18	Egyptian Premier League	21	10	0	0	1	2	—		22	12
Al Ahly	Total		154	50	11	5	57	12	10	3	232	70
KuPS (loan)	2018	Veikkausliiga	7	0	0	0	—				7	0
Al-Ahli	2018–19	Saudi Pro League	14	2	0	0	0	0	0	0	14	2
Pyramids	2018–19	Egyptian Premier League	18	4	3	0	—		—		21	4
Pyramids	2019–20	Egyptian Premier League	25	17	1	0	12 (Note: Appearances in CAF Confederation Cup)	4	—		38	21
Pyramids	2020–21	Egyptian Premier League	26	6	2	1	9	3	—		37	10
Pyramids	2021–22	Egyptian Premier League	31	6	5	0	10	0	—		46	6
Pyramids	2022–23	Egyptian Premier League	18	1	1	0	9	3	0	0	28	4
Pyramids	2023–24	Egyptian Premier League	8	2	0	0	4	0	2	0	16	2
Pyramids	Total		126	36	12	1	44	10	2	0	184	47
Zamalek	2023–24	Egyptian Premier League	19	5	1	1	—		—		22	6
Zamalek	2024–25	Egyptian Premier League	9	2	0	0	7	1	3 (Note: Two appearances in Egyptian Super Cup, one appearance run CAF Super Cup)	0	19	3
Zamalek	Total		28	7	1	1	7	1	3	0	41	9
Career total			469	132	32	7	128	25	22	8	658	172

=== International ===
Appearances and goals by national team and year
National team	Year	Apps	Goals
Egypt	2008	1	0
Egypt	2009	1	0
Egypt	2010	0	0
Egypt	2011	2	0
Egypt	2012	1	0
Egypt	2013	6	0
Egypt	2014	0	0
Egypt	2015	2	1
Egypt	2016	10	4
Egypt	2017	10	1
Egypt	2018	8	0
Egypt	2019	7	0
Egypt	2020	2	0
Egypt	2021	6	0
Egypt	2022	2	0
Total		58	6

Scores and results list Egypt's goal tally first.

List of international goals scored by Abdallah El Said
No.	Date	Venue	Opponent	Score	Result	Competition
1	17 November 2015	Borg El Arab Stadium, Alexandria, Egypt	Chad	2–0	4–0	2018 FIFA World Cup qualification
2	27 February 2016	Borg El Arab Stadium, Alexandria, Egypt	Burkina Faso	1–0	2–0	Friendly
3	27 February 2016	Borg El Arab Stadium, Alexandria, Egypt	Burkina Faso	2–0	2–0	Friendly
4	9 October 2016	Stade Municipal de Kintélé, Brazzaville, Congo	Congo	2–1	2–1	2018 FIFA World Cup qualification
5	13 November 2016	Borg El Arab Stadium, Alexandria, Egypt	Ghana	2–0	2–0	2018 FIFA World Cup qualification
6	21 January 2017	Stade de Port-Gentil, Port-Gentil, Gabon	Uganda	1–0	1–0	2017 Africa Cup of Nations

== Honours ==
Al Ahly

- Egyptian Premier League: 2013–14, 2015–16, 2016–17, 2017–18
- Egypt Cup: 2016–17
- Egyptian Super Cup: 2011, 2015, 2017
- CAF Champions League: 2012, 2013
- CAF Confederation Cup: 2014
- CAF Super Cup: 2013, 2014

Zamalek

- Egyptian Premier League: 2025–26
- Egypt Cup: 2024–25
- CAF Super Cup: 2024

Individual

- Egyptian Premier League top goalscorer: 2019–20
