= Ramadan Sobhi =

Egyptian footballer (born 1997)

Ramadan Sobhi رمضان صبحي
Personal information
- Full name: Ramadan Sobhi Ramadan Ahmed
- Date of birth: 23 January 1997 (age 29)
- Place of birth: Ard El Lewa, Giza, Egypt
- Height: 1.83 m (6 ft 0 in)
- Position: Forward

Youth career
- 2005–2014: Al Ahly

Senior career*
Years	Team	Apps	(Gls)
2014–2016	Al Ahly	55	(11)
2016–2018	Stoke City	41	(2)
2018–2019	Huddersfield Town	4	(0)
2019–2020	Al Ahly	24	(6)
2020–2026	Pyramids	81	(26)

International career
2013–2014	Egypt U17	19	(10)
2015	Egypt U20	2	(0)
2015–2021	Egypt U23	20	(7)
2015–2022	Egypt	37	(2)
Medal record
Men's football
Representing Egypt
Africa Cup of Nations
Runner-up	2017 Gabon
Runner-up	2021 Cameroon
Africa U-23 Cup of Nations
Winner	Egypt 2019	Egypt U23
- * Club domestic league appearances and goals as of 26 October 2024

Ramadan Sobhi Ramadan Ahmed (Egyptian Arabic: رمضان صبحي رمضان أحمد; born 23 January 1997) is an Egyptian professional footballer who plays as a forward. In November 2025, he received a four-year ban for doping.

Sobhi began his career with the leading Egyptian club Ahly SC of Cairo, making his professional debut in February 2014. He established himself in the first team at the Cairo International Stadium and helped Al Ahly to win the Egyptian Premier League title in the 2013–14 and 2015–16 campaigns. His performances attracted the attention of European clubs, and in July 2016, he joined English side Stoke City for a fee of £5 million. He spent two seasons with Stoke before joining Huddersfield Town in June 2018. He failed to establish himself at Huddersfield and returned to Al Ahly in January 2019. In September 2020, Sobhi moved to Pyramids FC.

== Club career ==
=== Al Ahly ===
After progressing through the youth ranks at Cairo club Al Ahly, Sobhi made his professional debut at the age of 17 on 6 February 2014, in a 2013–14 Egyptian Premier League match against Ghazl El Mahalla under the management of Mohamed Youssef. In April 2014 he took part in the Sheikh Zayed friendly tournament in the UAE with Al Ahly-U17s, and attracted the attentions of Spanish club Atlético Madrid. On 16 June 2014, he scored his first goal for Al Ahly in a 3–0 win over Misr Lel-Makkasa. On 28 June 2014 he started the decisive championship play-off match against city rivals, Zamalek and helped his team to a 1–0 victory. On 2 July he scored twice against Petrojet to secure a 4–0 win and Al Ahly went on to claim the league title. In March 2015, Sobhi signed a long-term contract with Al Ahly.

Sobhi helped Al Ahly win the 2014 Egyptian Super Cup against Zamalek. He became a regular under Juan Garrido and his performances in 2014–15 attracted the attentions of European clubs, including Arsenal, RB Leipzig, Roma, Sampdoria and Udinese. He scored a late equalizer against Al-Masry on 10 January 2015, in what was the first meeting between the clubs since the 2012 Port Said Stadium riot. Sobhi attracted international attention after he stood on the ball in a 2–0 win against Zamalek on 21 July 2015, which caused Hazem Emam to kick out at Sobhi and was sent off. Al Ahly ended the 2014–15 campaign in second place behind their arch rivals Zamalek.

Sobhi caused controversy in the 2015 Egyptian Super Cup against Zamalek as he repeated his stand on the ball trick, which enraged the Zamalek players. Al Ahly went on to win the match 3–2, and he later apologized for his showboating. He was sent off for the first time in his career on 15 April 2016 in a match against ENPPI, for an argument with an ENNPI player at half time. Sobhi played in 28 league matches for Al Ahly in 2015–16 under Martin Jol as the side claimed another league title.

=== Stoke City ===
Sobhi signed for Premier League club Stoke City on 25 July 2016 for a fee of £5 million. He made his Premier League debut for Stoke on 20 August 2016 against Manchester City. He made his first assist for Stoke on 31 October 2016 in a 3–1 win against Swansea City as his cross was deflected in by Alfie Mawson for an own goal. He made his first Premier League start in the next match against West Ham United, becoming the first teenager to start a league game for Stoke in nine years. After returning from the 2017 Africa Cup of Nations, Sobhi impressed in home wins over Crystal Palace and Middlesbrough. Sobhi played 19 times in 2016–17, as Stoke finished in 13th position.

Before the start of the 2017–18 season, Sobhi signed a new five-year contract with the Potters. He scored his first goal for Stoke on 23 August 2017 in a 4–0 EFL Cup win over Rochdale. He scored his first Premier League goal on 23 December 2017, scoring the last kick of the match in a 3–1 win against West Bromwich Albion, but was booked by referee Neil Swarbrick afterwards for excessive celebration. He followed this up with a goal against Huddersfield Town in a 1–1 on boxing day. Sobhi made 27 appearances in 2017–18 as Stoke suffered relegation to the EFL Championship.

=== Huddersfield Town ===
Sobhi joined Huddersfield Town on 12 June 2018, signing a three-year deal for a fee of £5.7 million. He struggled to impress David Wagner and only made four appearances for the Terriers before returning in Egyptian football in January 2019.

=== Return to Egypt ===
On 28 December 2018, Sobhi came back to his old club Al Ahly as a loan from Huddersfield for six months for a fee of £800,000. He extended his loan with Al Ahly for the 2019–20 season.

Sobhi made a move to the newly founded Pyramids FC on 7 September 2020.

In March 2024, it was reported that Sobhi tested positive for doping for samples taken in August 2023. It was reported in November 2025 that he had been banned for four years by the Court of Arbitration for Sport.

== International career ==
Sobhi made his national team debut against Tanzania on 14 June 2015 in the first round of 2017 Africa Cup of Nations qualifier at the age of 17 years, 11 months and 18 days, to become the second youngest player to ever play for the Egyptian national team after Mido. On 29 March, he scored his first international goal at the top level in a 2017 Africa Cup of Nations qualification game against Nigeria. In January Sobhi was selected by Héctor Cúper in the Egyptian squad that competed in the 2017 Africa Cup of Nations. Sobhi was mainly used as a substitute in the competition, featuring in four games out of the six as Egypt lost in the final to Cameroon. In May 2018 he was named in Egypt's preliminary squad for the 2018 FIFA World Cup in Russia.

In November 2019, he was the captain of the Egypt national under-23 football team in 2019 Africa U-23 Cup of Nations hosted by Egypt. Egypt won their first title by defeating Ivory Coast 2–1 in the final, with Ramadan scoring the second goal in the 114th minute. Ramadan was also selected as the best player of the tournament.

== Style of play ==
Sobhi is mostly used upfront on either wing. However, he also can be used as an attacking midfielder or a secondary striker. His style of play combines dribbling, clinical passing, vision.

== Personal life ==
Speaking in February 2016, Sobhi stated that he supports Spanish side Real Madrid. He is married to Habiba Ekramy, sister of Pyramids teammate and national teammate Sherif Ekramy, and daughter of Ahly player Ekramy El-Shahat.

It was reported by Reuters in November 2025 that Sobhi was being held in detention in Egypt for "allegations of academic fraud". In late December of the same year, he was sentenced to one year in prison with hard labour after being convicted in the case.

== Career statistics ==
=== Club ===
As of 5 December 2023

Appearances and goals by club, season and competition
Club	Season	League			National cup		League cup		Other		Total	
Club	Season	Division	Apps	Goals	Apps	Goals	Apps	Goals	Apps	Goals	Apps	Goals
Al Ahly	2013–14	Egyptian Premier League	3	1	3	0	—		3 (Note: Appearances and goals in the Egyptian Premier League Championship play-offs)	2	9	3
Al Ahly	2014–15	Egyptian Premier League	24	5	4	3	—		3 (Note: One appearance in Egyptian Super Cup, two in CAF Champions League)	0	31	8
Al Ahly	2015–16	Egyptian Premier League	28	5	0	0	—		6 (Note: One appearance in Egyptian Super Cup, five and one goal in CAF Champions League)	1	34	6
Al Ahly	Total		55	11	7	3	0	0	12	3	74	17
Stoke City	2016–17	Premier League	17	0	0	0	2	0	—		19	0
Stoke City	2017–18	Premier League	24	2	1	0	2	1	—		27	3
Stoke City	Total		41	2	1	0	4	1	0	0	46	3
Huddersfield Town	2018–19	Premier League	4	0	0	0	0	0	—		4	0
Al Ahly (loan)	2018–19	Egyptian Premier League	18	2	1	0	—		8 (Note: One appearance in Egyptian Super Cup, Seven in CAF Champions League)	0	27	2
Al Ahly (loan)	2019–20	Egyptian Premier League	6	4	0	0	—		3	1	9	5
Al Ahly (loan)	Total		24	6	1	0	0	0	10	1	36	7
Pyramids	2020–21	Egyptian Premier League	22	7	2	2	—		13 (Note: Appearances in the CAF Confederation Cup)	3	37	12
Pyramids	2021–22	Egyptian Premier League	23	7	3	1	—		8	0	34	8
Pyramids	2022–23	Egyptian Premier League	18	6	0	0	—		7	1	25	7
Pyramids	2023–24	Egyptian Premier League	6	1	0	0	—		3	0	9	1
Pyramids	Total		67	21	5	3	0	0	31	4	103	28
Career total			191	42	15	6	4	1	53	8	263	57

=== International ===
As of match played 3 February 2022

Appearances and goals by national team and year
National team	Year	Apps	Goals
Egypt
Egypt	2015	2	0
Egypt	2016	8	1
Egypt	2017	11	0
Egypt	2018	7	0
Egypt	2019	0	0
Egypt	2020	2	0
Egypt	2021	4	1
Egypt	2022	3	0
Total		37	2

Scores and results list Egypt's goal tally first, score column indicates score after each Sobhi goal.

List of international goals scored by Ramadan Sobhi
No.	Date	Venue	Cap	Opponent	Score	Result	Competition	Ref.
1	29 March 2016	Borg El Arab Stadium, Alexandria, Egypt	6	Nigeria	1–0	1–0	2017 Africa Cup of Nations qualification	
2	11 October 2021	Martyrs of February Stadium, Benghazi, Libya	34	Libya	3–0	3–0	2022 FIFA World Cup qualification	

== Honours ==
Al Ahly

- Egyptian Premier League: 2013–14, 2015–16, 2018–19, 2019–20
- Egyptian Super Cup: 2014, 2015, 2018
- CAF Champions League: 2019–20
- CAF Confederation Cup: 2014

Pyramids

- Egypt Cup: 2023–24
- CAF Champions League: 2024–25
- FIFA African–Asian–Pacific Cup: 2025

Egypt U23

- Africa U-23 Cup of Nations: 2019

Individual

- Africa U-23 Cup of Nations final Man of the Match: 2019
- Africa U-23 Cup of Nations Best Player: 2019
- Africa U-23 Cup of Nations Team of the tournament: 2019
