= Islam Serry =

Egyptian footballer (born 1992)

Personal information
- Date of birth: 16 January 1992 (age 34)
- Place of birth: Ismailia, Egypt
- Height: 1.77 m (5 ft 10 in)
- Position: Right back

Team information
- Current team: Tala'ea El Gaish
- Number: 2

Senior career*
Years	Team	Apps	(Gls)
2013–2014	Sohag		
2015	Al Ahly	0	(0)
2015	→ Petrojet (loan)		
2016	Baladeyet El Mahalla		
2016	Al Nasr Lel Taa'den		
2017–2018	Smouha		
2018	Al Masry (loan)		
2018–	Tala'ea El Gaish		
- * Club domestic league appearances and goals

Islam Serry (Arabic: اسلام سرى; born 16 January 1992) is an Egyptian footballer who played as a defender.
