= 2020–21 Pyramids FC season =

Pyramids FC
2020–21 season
- Manager: Rodolfo Arruabarrena (until 29 June); Takis Gonias (from 29 June)
- Stadium: 30 June Stadium
- Egyptian Premier League: 3rd
- Egypt Cup: Pre-season
Home colours	Away colours	Third colours

The 2020–21 season was the third season in the history of the Pyramids FC, and the club's third consecutive season in the Egyptian Premier League. In addition to the domestic league, the team participated in the Egypt Cup.

== Kits ==
Supplier: Puma / Main sponsor: none

Home	Away	Away alternate	Third

== Competitions ==
=== Overall record ===
Competition	First match	Last match	Starting round	Final position	Record							
Competition	First match	Last match	Starting round	Final position	Pld	W	D	L	GF	GA	GD	Win %
Egyptian Premier League	12 December 2020		Matchday 1	3rd	34	13	16	5	57	37	+20	38.24
Egypt Cup					0	0	0	0	0	0	+0	—
Total					34	13	16	5	57	37	+20	38.24

Source: Competitions

=== Egyptian Premier League ===
==== League table ====
Pos	Team	Pld	W	D	L	GF	GA	GD	Pts	Qualification or relegation
1	Zamalek (Note: The 2020–21 Egyptian Premier League was not finished by the CAF deadline. As a result, the Egyptian Football Association announced that Zamalek and Al Ahly, who were at first and second place after 29 rounds respectively, will represent Egypt in the 2021–22 CAF Champions League. Meanwhile, Al Masry and Pyramids FC, who were at third and fourth place after 29 rounds respectively, will represent Egypt in the 2021–22 CAF Confederation Cup.) (C)	34	24	8	2	61	21	+40	80	Qualification for the Champions League
2	Al Ahly	34	22	10	2	72	29	+43	76	Qualification for the Champions League
3	Pyramids	34	13	16	5	51	37	+14	55	Qualification for the Confederation Cup
4	Smouha	34	12	18	4	54	41	+13	54	
5	Al Masry	34	13	11	10	44	38	+6	50	Qualification for the Confederation Cup

Source: Soccerway
Rules for classification: 1) Points; 2) Head-to-Head points; 3) Head-to-Head goal difference; 4) Head-to-Head goals scored; 5) Head-to-Head away goals scored; 6) Goal difference; 7) Goals scored.
(Note: Head-to-head record is used only after all the matches between the teams in question have been played).
(C) Champions

==== Results summary ====
Overall								Home						Away					
Pld	W	D	L	GF	GA	GD	Pts	W	D	L	GF	GA	GD	W	D	L	GF	GA	GD
34	13	16	5	57	37	+20	55	5	8	4	26	21	+5	8	8	1	31	16	+15

==== Results by round ====
Round	1	2	3	4	5	6	7	8	9	10	11	12
Ground	H	H	H	A	H	A	H	A	A	H	A	H
Result	L	D	D	W	W	D	W	D	D	D	L	W
Position												

A = Away; H = Home; W = Win; D = Draw; L = Loss

==== Matches ====
The match schedule was released on 23 November 2020.

12 December 2020 1	Pyramids	1–2	Al Ittihad	Cairo
				Stadium: 30 June Stadium

17 December 2020 2	Pyramids	1–1	Zamalek	Cairo
19:30 UTC+2				Stadium: 30 June Stadium

27 December 2020 4	Ceramica Cleopatra	0–1	Pyramids	Suez
				Stadium: Suez Stadium

1 January 2021 5	Pyramids	3–2	El Entag El Harby	Cairo
				Stadium: 30 June Stadium

8 January 2021 6	National Bank	0–0	Pyramids	Cairo
				Stadium: Police Academy Stadium

11 January 2021 3	Pyramids	1–1	Wadi Degla	Cairo
				Stadium: 30 June Stadium

15 January 2021 7	Pyramids	3–1	Al Mokawloon Al Arab	Cairo
				Stadium: 30 June Stadium

22 January 2021 9	Smouha	1–1	Pyramids	Alexandria
				Stadium: Alexandria Stadium

26 January 2021 9	Pyramids	0–0	Al Ahly	Cairo
				Stadium: 30 June Stadium

30 January 2021 8	Ismaily	1–1	Pyramids	Ismailia
				Stadium: Ismailia Stadium

3 February 2021 11	ENPPI	3–2	Pyramids	Cairo
				Stadium: Petrosport Stadium

6 February 2021 12	Pyramids	1–0	Tala'ea El Gaish	Cairo
	Rolán 77' (pen.)			Stadium: 30 June Stadium

=== Egypt Cup ===
13 March 2021 Round of 32	Pyramids	4–1	El Obour

24 September 2021 Round of 16	Smouha	1–3	Pyramids
