= Juan Carlos Garrido =

Spanish football manager (born 1969)

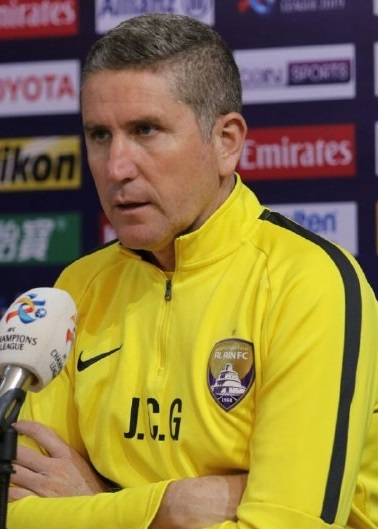
- Garrido as manager of Al Ain in 2019

Personal information
- Full name: Juan Carlos Garrido Fernández
- Date of birth: 29 March 1969 (age 57)
- Place of birth: Valencia, Spain
- Height: 1.80 m (5 ft 11 in)

Team information
- Current team: Volos (manager)

Managerial career
- Years: Team
- 1993–1998: El Puig
- 1998–1999: Onda
- 2003: Villarreal B
- 2004: Villarreal B
- 2004–2005: Villarreal B
- 2008–2010: Villarreal B
- 2010–2011: Villarreal
- 2012–2013: Club Brugge
- 2013–2014: Betis
- 2014–2015: Al Ahly
- 2016–2017: Ettifaq
- 2017–2019: Raja
- 2019: Al Ain
- 2019–2020: Étoile du Sahel
- 2020: Wydad
- 2021: Castellón
- 2022: Ismaily
- 2023: Wydad
- 2023–2024: USM Alger
- 2024: Persepolis
- 2025: Al Ittihad Tripoli
- 2025–2026: MC Oran
- 2026–: Volos

Juan Carlos Garrido Fernández (born 29 March 1969) is a Spanish football manager. He is the current manager of Super League Greece club Volos.

== Football career ==
=== Villarreal ===
Born in Valencia, Garrido started managing at only 24, his first club being local amateurs El Puig Club de Fútbol. In the 1998–99 season he coached CD Onda in Tercera División as the side was Villarreal CF's farm team, a club to which he would be closely associated in the following years.

In 2003, Garrido led the reserves– Onda was now an independent team – to a fourth-division promotion, then was in charge of them for a couple of months in 2004 also in that tier. In October 2004, he was again named manager of the B side in the place of José del Solar, and narrowly missed out another promotion after finishing fifth.

After the appointment of Luis García as manager in May 2005, Garrido returned to his previous duties in the backroom staff. On 18 January 2008, he replaced sacked Juan Carlos Oliva at the helm of Villarreal B, eventually leading them to the 11th position in Segunda División B and achieving a first-ever Segunda División promotion the following campaign.

On 1 February 2010, Garrido was appointed first-team manager following the dismissal of Ernesto Valverde after a 0–2 home loss against CA Osasuna. On 26 April, before the season in La Liga was over, he was handed a contract set to expire in June 2011; the side finished in seventh position but, after RCD Mallorca were deemed ineligible for participation in the UEFA Europa League by UEFA due to financial irregularities, the Valencians took their place.

In his first full season, Garrido led the club to the fourth place in the league, with the subsequent qualification to the UEFA Champions League. The team also reached the semi-finals in the Europa League, being ousted by eventual winners FC Porto.

Garrido and Villarreal could not manage one single point in the Champions League in 2011–12, and the latter ranked dangerously close to the relegation zone in the league in that period. On 21 December 2011, following a 0–2 home loss against CD Mirandés in the round of 32 of the Copa del Rey (1–3 on aggregate), he was sacked.

=== Club Brugge and Betis ===
On 15 November 2012, Garrido replaced fired Georges Leekens at Club Brugge KV. He was relieved of his duties in September of the following year, replacing fired Pepe Mel at the helm of Real Betis two months later; on 19 January 2014, after only nine official matches and only one win, he was himself sacked after three consecutive defeats – the last one in the league 5–0 at home to Real Madrid – and with the Andalusians finishing dead last.

=== Africa and Arabia ===
On 8 July 2014, Garrido was appointed at Al Ahly SC in the Egyptian Premier League. Late into the month, he led his new team to a 1–0 win against Séwé FC for the CAF Confederation Cup which the club eventually won, also conquering the Egyptian Super Cup; on 3 May 2015, however, he was dismissed.

On 6 November 2016, Garrido was appointed manager of Ettifaq FC in the Saudi Professional League, signing a seven-month deal with an option for another season according to result and team performance. He was relieved of his duties the following February, with the side in eighth place after 22 matches.

Garrido switched clubs and countries again in June 2017, joining Raja CA from Morocco. His first game in charge of the latter took place on 10 September, in a 1–1 away draw against Olympique Club de Khouribga. He won the year's Throne Cup with a penalty shootout victory over Difaâ Hassani El Jadidi on 18 November, and a year later the CAF Confederation Cup with a 4–3 aggregate win over AS Vita Club from the Democratic Republic of the Congo.

A month after being sacked by Raja, in February 2019 Garrido replaced Zoran Mamić at UAE Pro League club Al Ain FC for the rest of the season. At its closure, he was succeeded by another Croat, Ivan Leko.

Garrido was hired by Tunisia's Étoile Sportive du Sahel on 20 November 2019, on a deal until June 2021. Less than three months later, however, he was dismissed due to poor results.

On 25 February 2020, Garrido returned to Casablanca, joining Raja's rivals Wydad AC. He was fired in September despite taking the team to the Champions League semi-finals, as they were trailing Raja by four points on the domestic front.

Garrido returned to Spain on 12 January 2021 after nearly seven years, being appointed manager of CD Castellón in the second division. He was dismissed on 21 May, as the club faced relegation with two games remaining.

On 20 September 2022, Garrido went back to Egypt's top flight, taking over at last-placed Ismaily SC. He was shown the door on 9 December, after taking two points from five games.

Garrido was hired again by Wydad on 26 February 2023, replacing Mehdi Nafti who had performed poorly at the recent edition of the FIFA Club World Cup. He was dismissed by club chairman Said Naciri on 5 May with the club one point behind AS FAR in the league and awaiting the Champions League semi-finals.

=== USM Alger ===
On 17 October 2023 Juan Carlos Garrido was appointed new coach in USM Alger for one season. The Usmist management set its sights on Garrido for his experience, particularly in North Africa. In the case of Tumisang Orebonye, Garrido accused him for his lack of commitment and enthusiasm in the job. The Spaniard accused his player of cheating, by faking fictitious injuries in order not to take part in matches.

=== Persepolis ===
On 25 June 2024 it was announced that Garrido would take over as manager of Persian Gulf Pro League club Persepolis on a two-year contract. He was expelled from Persepolis club after the defeat against [Mes Rafsanjan] on 22 December 2024.

=== MC Oran ===
On 8 September 2025, he was appointed manager of Algerian club MC Oran. On 5 February 2026, he was sacked due to bad results.

== Managerial statistics ==
As of match played 22 November 2026

Managerial record by team and tenure
Team	Nat	From	To	Record				
Team	Nat	From	To	G	W	D	L	Win %
El Puig	(Spain)	10 June 1993	30 June 1998	188	75	45	68	39.89
Onda	(Spain)	30 June 1998	25 May 1999	38	15	8	15	39.47
Villarreal B	(Spain)	21 January 2003	28 June 2003	19	17	2	0	89.47
Villarreal B	(Spain)	22 February 2004	30 June 2004	18	9	5	4	50.00
Villarreal B	(Spain)	5 October 2004	30 May 2005	32	15	12	5	46.88
Villarreal B	(Spain)	18 January 2008	31 January 2010	84	43	17	24	51.19
Villarreal	(Spain)	31 January 2010	21 December 2011	106	45	23	38	42.45
Club Brugge	(Belgium)	15 November 2012	19 September 2013	37	20	9	8	54.05
Betis	(Spain)	2 December 2013	19 January 2014	10	2	3	5	20.00
Al Ahly	(Egypt)	8 July 2014	4 May 2015	40	22	10	8	55.00
Ettifaq	(Saudi Arabia)	6 November 2016	18 February 2017	12	3	3	6	25.00
Raja	(Morocco)	20 June 2017	28 January 2019	81	39	28	14	48.15
Al Ain	(United Arab Emirates)	18 February 2019	2 June 2019	17	4	4	9	23.53
Étoile du Sahel	(Tunisia)	18 November 2019	8 February 2020	13	5	3	5	38.46
Wydad	(Morocco)	25 February 2020	10 September 2020	7	3	2	2	42.86
Castellón	(Spain)	13 January 2021	21 May 2021	19	6	4	9	31.58
Ismaily	(Egypt)	20 September 2022	9 December 2022	8	1	3	4	12.50
Wydad	(Morocco)	26 February 2023	5 May 2023	14	8	5	1	57.14
USM Alger	(Algeria)	17 October 2023	24 June 2024	42	23	6	13	54.76
Persepolis	(Iran)	6 July 2024	22 December 2024	20	9	5	6	45.00
Al Ittihad Tripoli	(Libya)	8 January 2025	15 June 2025	21	12	5	4	57.14
MC Oran	(Algeria)	8 September 2025	5 February 2026	15	5	4	6	33.33
Volos	(Greece)	26 October 2026		3	0	0	3	0.00
Total				824	372	201	251	45.15

== Honours ==
Al Ahly

- Egyptian Super Cup: 2014
- CAF Confederation Cup: 2014

Raja Casablanca

- Moroccan Throne Cup: 2017
- CAF Confederation Cup: 2018

Individual

- Persian Gulf Pro League Coach of the Month: November 2024
