= 2014 Egyptian Super Cup =

2014–15 Egyptian Super Cup
Al Ahly	Zamalek
0	0
- Al Ahly won 5–4 on penalties
- Date: 14 September 2014
- Venue: Cairo International Stadium, Cairo
- Referee: Mohamed Farouk (Egypt)
- Attendance: 200
- Weather: Clear; 28 °C (82 °F); 52% humidity

The 2014–15 Egyptian Super Cup was the 12th Egyptian Super Cup, an annual football match contested by the winners of the previous season's Egyptian Premier League and Egypt Cup competition, Ahly defeated Zamalek 5–4 on penalties to claim its 8th Super Cup title.

== Match details ==
14 September 2014
20:00 UTC+3

Al Ahly	0 – 0	Zamalek
	[[[Category:All articles with unsourced statements]] Report]
Penalties
Abd El-Zaher (penalty missed); Soliman (penalty missed); Nagieb (penalty scored); Ali (penalty scored); Samir (penalty scored); Raheel (penalty scored); Rizk (penalty scored)	5–4	(penalty scored) Abdel-Shafy; (penalty scored) Kamar; (penalty missed) Samir; (penalty scored) Gaber; (penalty missed) Koffi; (penalty scored) Tawfik; (penalty missed) Salah

Cairo International Stadium
Attendance: 200
Referee: Mohamed Farouk

Al Ahly	Zamalek

Man of the Match:
Sherif Ekramy

Assistant referees:
Tahseen Al-Sadat
Ahmed Hossam
Fourth official:
Mohamed El-Hanafy

Match rules

- 90 minutes.
- Penalty shoot-out if scores level after 90 minutes.
- Three named substitutes.
- Maximum of six substitutions.
