= Ahmed Adel Abdel Moneam =

Egyptian footballer (born 1987)

Ahmed Adel
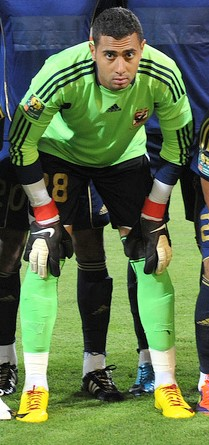
- Ahmed Adel with Al Ahly in 2011

Personal information
- Full name: Ahmed Adel Abdel Moneam
- Date of birth: 10 April 1987 (age 39)
- Place of birth: Port Said, Egypt
- Height: 1.90 m (6 ft 3 in)
- Position: Goalkeeper

Youth career
- 1996–2007: Al Ahly

Senior career*
Years	Team	Apps	(Gls)
2007–2017	Al Ahly	70	(0)
2017–2020	Misr Lel-Makkasa	42	(0)
2020–2021	El Gouna FC	9	(0)
2021–2026	Ismaily SC	60	(0)
- * Club domestic league appearances and goals as of 18 July 2026

Ahmed Adel Abdel Moneam (Arabic: احمد عادل عبد المنعم; born 10 April 1987) is an Egyptian professional footballer who plays as a goalkeeper.

Ahmed made his competitive debut for Al Ahly against Ismaily in season 2007–08 and it was 1–1 draw after Essam El-Hadary departure to FC Sion and Amir Abdelhamid's injury.

Ahmed Adel was selected to play for Egypt at the 2005 FIFA World Youth Championship in the Netherlands.

== 2009–10 Season ==
In the 2009–10 season, under new coach Hossam El Badry, Ahmed Adel was chosen as the regular keeper for the team. Ahmed Adel made great performances and managed to keep many clean sheets. Prior to that Ahmed Adel was chosen for the preliminary 2010 Africa Cup of Nations squad for Egypt but was left out of the final 23-man squad. When Al Ahly signed Sherif Ekramy halfway through the 2009–10 season, and he no longer became part of the starting eleven.

== 2011–12 Season ==
He made some appearances due to Sherif Ekramy's injury - but is no longer a regular starter.

== Honours ==
Al Ahly

- Egyptian Premier League: 2006–07, 2007–08, 2009–10, 2010–11, 2013–14, 2015–16, 2016–17, 2017–18
- Egypt Cup: 2016–17
- Egyptian Super Cup: 2014, 2015
- CAF Champions League: 2012, 2013
- CAF Confederation Cup: 2014
- CAF Super Cup: 2013, 2014
