= Basem Ali =

Egyptian footballer (born 1988)

Personal information
- Date of birth: 27 October 1988 (age 38)
- Place of birth: Cairo, Egypt
- Height: 1.84 m (6 ft 0 in)
- Position: Right back

Team information
- Current team: Modern Sport FC
- Number: 2

Senior career*
Years	Team	Apps	(Gls)
–2008	Manshiyat El Shohada		
2008–2009	Asyut Petroleum		
2009–2014	Al Mokawloon Al Arab	100	(3)
2014–2020	Al Ahly	45	(1)
2019–2020	→ El Gouna (loan)	24	(0)
2020–2022	Al Mokawloon Al Arab	39	(1)
2022–	Modern Sport FC	53	(2)

International career
2012–2013	Egypt	13	(0)
- * Club domestic league appearances and goals

Basem Ali (Arabic: باسم على; born 27 October 1988) is an Egyptian international footballer who plays as a right back for Egyptian club Modern Future.

== Career statistics ==
=== Club ===
As of 9 March 2020

Club	Season	League			Cup (Note: All appearances in the Egypt Cup)		Continental		Other		Total	
Club	Season	Division	Apps	Goals	Apps	Goals	Apps	Goals	Apps	Goals	Apps	Goals
Al Mokawloon Al Arab	2009–10	Egyptian Premier League	22	1	1	1	—		—		23	2
Al Mokawloon Al Arab	2010–11	Egyptian Premier League	29	1	4	0	—		—		32	1
Al Mokawloon Al Arab	2011–12	Egyptian Premier League	15	1	—		—		—		15	1
Al Mokawloon Al Arab	2012–13	Egyptian Premier League	15	0	0	0	—		—		15	0
Al Mokawloon Al Arab	2013–14	Egyptian Premier League	19	0	2	0	—		—		21	0
Al Mokawloon Al Arab	Total		100	3	7	1	0	0	0	0	107	4
Al Ahly	2014–15	Egyptian Premier League	26	0	2	0	17 (Note: Four appearances in the CAF Champions League, 13 in the CAF Confederation Cup)	0	2 (Note: One appearance in the Egyptian Super Cup, one in the CAF Super Cup)	0	47	0
Al Ahly	2015–16	Egyptian Premier League	2	0	2	0	2 (Note: Appearances in the CAF Champions League)	0	0	0	6	0
Al Ahly	2016–17	Egyptian Premier League	3	0	2	0	0	0	3 (Note: Appearances in the Arab Club Champions Cup)	0	8	0
Al Ahly	2017–18	Egyptian Premier League	8	1	1	0	0	0	0	0	9	1
Al Ahly	2018–19	Egyptian Premier League	6	0	0	0	0	0	0	0	6	0
Al Ahly	2019–20	Egyptian Premier League	0	0	0	0	0	0	0	0	0	0
Al Ahly	Total		45	1	7	0	19	0	5	0	78	1
El Gouna (loan)	2019–20	Egyptian Premier League	17	0	1	0	—		—		18	0
Career total			162	4	15	1	19	0	5	0	203	5
