= Emad Moteab =

Egyptian footballer (born 1983)

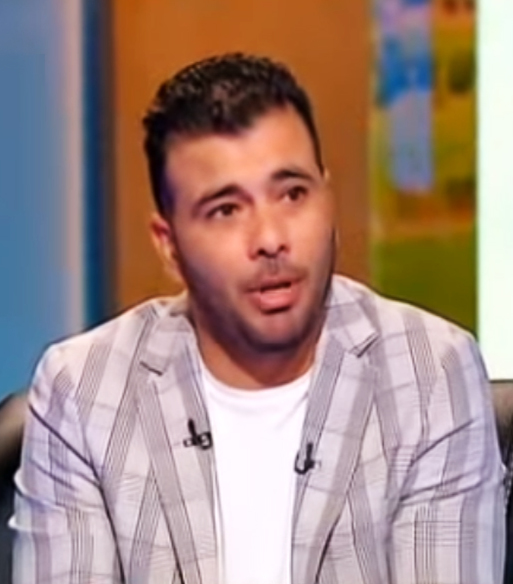
- Moteab in 2019

Personal information
- Full name: Emad Mohamed Abdelnaby Ibrahim Moteab
- Date of birth: 20 February 1983 (age 43)
- Place of birth: Sharkia, Egypt
- Height: 1.76 m (5 ft 9 in)
- Position: Striker

Youth career
- 1993–2003: Al Ahly

Senior career*
Years	Team	Apps	(Gls)
2003–2018	Al Ahly	187	(75)
2008–2009	→ Al Ittihad (loan)	16	(10)
2018	→ Al Taawoun (loan)	9	(0)
Total		215	(85)

International career
2003	Egypt U20	17	(9)
2012	Egypt Olympic (O.P.)	4	(0)
2004–2015	Egypt	70	(28)
Medal record
Men's football
Representing Egypt
Africa Cup of Nations
Winner	2006 Egypt
Winner	2008 Ghana
Winner	2010 Angola
African Youth Championship
Winner	2003 Burkina Faso
- * Club domestic league appearances and goals

Emad Mohamed Abdelnaby Ibrahim Moteab (Arabic: عِمَاد مُحَمَّد عَبْد النَّبِيّ إِبْرَاهِيم مُتْعِب; born 20 February 1983) is an Egyptian former professional footballer who played as a striker.

== International career ==
Moteab played for the youth team in 2003 in Burkina Faso under the leadership of Hassan Shehata, scoring five goals and winning the championship with the team. Then he participated in the 2003 Youth World Cup in the Emirates and scored a historic goal against England, which FIFA chose as the best goal in the tournament.

He joined the first team after that, also under the leadership of Hassan Shehata, and was able to win three consecutive African Nations titles in 2006, 2008, and 2010.

He also won the gold medal in the Arab Games in Cairo 2007, where he was the top scorer with 5 goals. He has three other friendly tournaments: the Lausanne tournament, the Nelson Mandela tournament, and the LG tournament. The number of his participations with the first team reached 70 matches, scoring 28 goals, and he is the sixth top scorer in the history of the Egyptian national team.

Meteb's goal against the Algerian national team at Cairo International Stadium in the 2010 World Cup qualifiers is considered his most prominent goal after he scored a goal in the fatal time with a header that shook the entire Cairo Stadium.

== Career statistics ==
=== International ===
Appearances and goals by national team and year
National team	Year	Apps	Goals
Egypt	2004	1	1
Egypt	2005	11	6
Egypt	2006	11	4
Egypt	2007	8	1
Egypt	2008	16	8
Egypt	2009	6	3
Egypt	2010	8	2
Egypt	2011	1	0
Egypt	2012	5	2
Egypt	2013	0	0
Egypt	2014	2	0
Egypt	2015	1	0
Total		70	28

Scores and results list Egypt's goal tally first, score column indicates score after each Moteab goal.

List of international goals scored by Emad Moteab
No.	Date	Venue	Opponent	Score	Result	Competition
1	29 November 2004	Osman Ahmed Osman Stadium, Cairo, Egypt	Bulgaria	1–0	1–1	Friendly
2	4 February 2005	Seoul World Cup Stadium, Seoul, South Korea	South Korea	1–0	1–0	Friendly
3	9 February 2005	Cairo Military Academy Stadium, Cairo, Egypt	Belgium	1–0	4–0	Friendly
4	9 February 2005	Cairo Military Academy Stadium, Cairo, Egypt	Belgium	2–0	4–0	Friendly
5	14 March 2005	Prince Mohamed bin Fahd Stadium, Dammam, Saudi Arabia	Saudi Arabia	1–0	1–0	Friendly
6	27 March 2005	Osman Ahmed Osman Stadium, Cairo, Egypt	Libya	2–1	4–1	2006 FIFA World Cup qualification
7	27 March 2005	Osman Ahmed Osman Stadium, Cairo, Egypt	Libya	4–1	4–1	2006 FIFA World Cup qualification
8	28 January 2006	Cairo International Stadium, Cairo, Egypt	Ivory Coast	1–0	3–1	2006 Africa Cup of Nations
9	28 January 2006	Cairo International Stadium, Cairo, Egypt	Ivory Coast	3–1	3–1	2006 Africa Cup of Nations
10	3 February 2006	Cairo International Stadium, Cairo, Egypt	DR Congo	3–1	4–1	2006 Africa Cup of Nations
11	15 November 2006	Griffin Park, Brentford, England	South Africa	3–1	4–1	Friendly
12	25 November 2007	Cairo International Stadium, Cairo, Egypt	Saudi Arabia	2–0	2–1	2007 Pan Arab Games
13	13 January 2008	Complexo Desportivo FC Alverca, Alverca do Ribatejo, Portugal	Angola	1–0	3–3	Friendly
14	13 January 2008	Complexo Desportivo FC Alverca, Alverca do Ribatejo, Portugal	Angola	2–1	3–3	Friendly
15	13 January 2008	Complexo Desportivo FC Alverca, Alverca do Ribatejo, Portugal	Angola	3–3	3–3	Friendly
16	22 June 2008	Cairo International Stadium, Cairo, Egypt	Malawi	1–0	2–0	2010 FIFA World Cup qualification
17	22 June 2008	Cairo International Stadium, Cairo, Egypt	Malawi	2–0	2–0	2010 FIFA World Cup qualification
18	12 October 2008	Cairo Military Academy Stadium, Cairo, Egypt	Djibouti	1–0	4–0	2010 FIFA World Cup qualification
19	19 November 2008	Cairo International Stadium, Cairo, Egypt	Benin	2–0	5–1	Friendly
20	19 November 2008	Cairo International Stadium, Cairo, Egypt	Benin	3–0	5–1	Friendly
21	11 February 2009	Cairo International Stadium, Cairo, Egypt	Ghana	2–2	2–2	Friendly
22	5 November 2009	Aswan Stadium, Aswan, Egypt	Tanzania	1–0	5–1	Friendly
23	5 November 2009	Aswan Stadium, Aswan, Egypt	Tanzania	3–0	5–1	Friendly
24	14 November 2009	Cairo International Stadium, Cairo, Egypt	Algeria	2–0	2–0	2010 FIFA World Cup qualification
25	12 January 2010	Estádio Nacional de Ombaka, Benguela, Angola	Nigeria	1–1	3–1	2010 Africa Cup of Nations
26	20 January 2010	Estádio Nacional de Ombaka, Benguela, Angola	Benin	2–0	2–0	2010 Africa Cup of Nations
27	15 April 2012	Rashid Stadium, Dubai, United Arab Emirates	Mauritania	3–0	3–0	Friendly
28	30 June 2012	Barthélemy Boganda Stadium, Bangui, Central African Republic	Central African Republic	1–1	1–1	2013 Africa Cup of Nations qualification

== Honours and achievements ==
Al Ahly

- Egyptian Premier League: 2004–05, 2005–06, 2006–07, 2007–08, 2009–10, 2010–11, 2013–14, 2015–16, 2016–17
- Egypt Cup: 2005-06, 2006-07, 2016–17
- Egyptian Super Cup: 2005, 2006, 2007, 2008, 2010, 2012, 2014, 2015
- CAF Champions League: 2005, 2006, 2012, 2013
- CAF Confederation Cup: 2014
- CAF Super Cup: 2006, 2007, 2013, 2014

Al-Ittihad

- Saudi Professional League: 2008–09

Egypt U20

- African Youth Championship: 2003

Egypt

- African Cup of Nations: 2006, 2008, 2010

Sporting positions
Preceded by Hossam Ghaly	Al Ahly SC captain 2017–2018	Succeeded by Hossam Ashour
