= Saleh Gomaa =

Egyptian footballer (born 1993)

Personal information
- Full name: Saleh Gomaa
- Date of birth: 1 August 1993 (age 33)
- Place of birth: Arish, North Sinai, Egypt
- Height: 1.75 m (5 ft 9 in)
- Position: Attacking midfielder

Senior career*
Years	Team	Apps	(Gls)
2010–2015	ENPPI	21	(1)
2014–2015	→ Nacional (loan)	36	(2)
2015–2020	Al Ahly	53	(8)
2018	→ Al Faisaly (loan)	8	(0)
2020–2022	Ceramica Cleopatra	0	(0)
2022–2024	Ismaily SC	13	(0)
2024	Al-Karkh SC	0	(0)

International career
2011–2014	Egypt U20	8	(1)
2012–2014	Egypt U23	25	(3)
2011–2017	Egypt	15	(0)
- * Club domestic league appearances and goals as of 4 September 2020

Saleh Gomaa (Arabic: صالح جمعة; born 1 August 1993) is an Egyptian professional footballer who formerly played for Al Ahly and currently plays for Ismailia-based club, Ismaily SC, and the Egyptian national team. He competed at the 2012 Summer Olympics and the 2013 African U-20 Championship. As a 19-year-old, he played at the 2013 African U-20 championship in Algeria and won "The Player of the Tournament" award, when the Egyptians won their trophy. He is the elder brother of the Egyptian footballer Abdallah Gomaa.

== Career ==
Gomaa has played for the Egypt national team and was the youngest player in the squad when he represented Egypt at the 2012 London Olympics. In just one year, Gomaa represented Egypt for the U20, U23, and the first team squads.

=== With clubs ===
team	season	League		Cup		Continental tournaments		Total	
team	season	APP	Goals	APP	Goals	APP	Goals	APP	Goals
ENPPI SC	2010–2011	10	0	4	0	—		14	0
ENPPI SC	2011–2012	8	0			3	0	11	0
ENPPI SC	2012–2013	1	0			1	0	2	0
ENPPI SC	2013–2014	2	1			—		2	1
ENPPI SC	Total	21	1	4	0	4	0	29	1
Nacional Madeira (loan)	2013–2014	13	1	1	0	—		14	1
Nacional Madeira (loan)	2014–2015	23	1	7	0	2	0	32	1
Nacional Madeira (loan)	Total	36	2	8	0	2	0	46	2
Al Ahly	2014–2015	0	0	0	0	2	0	2	0
Al Ahly	2015–2016	18	2	1	0	4	0	23	0
Al Ahly	2016–2017	6	0	1	0	0	0	7	0
Al Ahly	Total	24	2	2	0	6	0	32	2

== International career ==
Gomaa was a member of the Egypt national under-20 football team that won the 2013 African U-20 Championship in Algeria. He scored two goals in the competition, including a penalty in the final against Ghana. He was selected as the best player of the tournament.

Gomaa was a key player for the Egyptian team at the CAF U23 Championship in Morocco.

== Career statistics ==
=== International ===
Appearances and goals by national team and year
National team	Year	Apps	Goals
Egypt	2011	1	0
Egypt	2012	5	0
Egypt	2013	2	0
Egypt	2014	1	0
Egypt	2015	2	0
Egypt	2016	1	0
Egypt	2017	3	0
Total		15	0

== Honours ==
Al Ahly

- Egyptian Premier League: 2015–16, 2016–17, 2017–18, 2018–19
- Egypt Cup: 2017

Enppi

- Egypt Cup: 2010–11

Egypt

- 2013 African U-20 Championship
