= Mosaad Awad =

Egyptian footballer (born 1993)

Personal information
- Full name: Mosaad Awad Salama
- Date of birth: January 15, 1993 (age 33)
- Place of birth: Ismailia, Egypt
- Height: 1.91 m (6 ft 3 in)
- Position: Goalkeeper

Team information
- Current team: Wadi Degla

Youth career
- –2013: Ismaily
- 2013: Al-Ahly

Senior career*
| Years | Team | Apps | (Gls) |
| 2013–2017 | Al-Ahly | 3 | (0) |
| 2017–2018 | Smouha | | |
| 2018–2018 | → Tala'ea El Gaish (loan) | | |
| 2018–2019 | Haras El Hodoud | | |
| 2019–2020 | Aswan | | |
| 2020–2022 | Wadi Degla | | |
| 2022–2023 | El-Sharqiya Lel-Dokhan | | |
| 2023–3 | El Gouna FC | | |
| 2020–2022 | Aswan | | |

International career^{‡}
| 2010–2013 | Egypt U-20 | | |
| 2014–2016 | Egypt U-23 | | |
| 2013– | Egypt | 1 | (0) |
- * Club domestic league appearances and goals as of August 14, 2013 ‡ National team caps and goals as of August 14, 2013

Mosaad Awad Salama (Arabic: مسعد عوض سلامة) (born January 15, 1993, in Ismailia) is a football goalkeeper from Egypt plays for Wadi Degla of Egypt.

He was a member of Egypt U-20 national team participating in 2013 FIFA U-20 World Cup.

== Club career ==
Awad started his career playing for Ismaily and Al-Ahly. Later on, he played for Smouha, Tala'ea El Gaish, Haras El Hodoud and Aswan. In October 2020, he signed for Wadi Degla.

== International career ==
Awad made his debut with Egypt in a friendly against Uganda on 14 August 2013 under Bob Bradley. He made the bench on the 2014 World Cup qualifier match against Guinea on 15 September 2013.
