= Shawky El Said =

Egyptian footballer (born 1987)

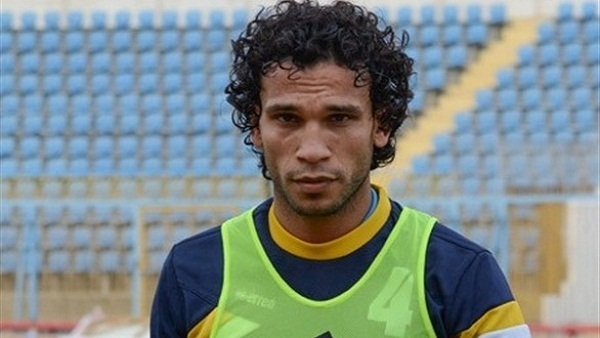

Personal information
- Full name: Shawky El Said
- Date of birth: January 1, 1987 (age 39)
- Place of birth: Cairo, Egypt
- Height: 1.80 m (5 ft 11 in)
- Position: Centre back

Youth career
- El Shams

Senior career*
Years	Team	Apps	(Gls)
2006–2009	El Shams		
2009–2013	El Gouna	71	(2)
2013–2016	Ismaily	64	(7)
2016–2017	Zamalek SC	7	(1)
2017–2018	Al-Arabi SC	13	(0)
2018-2019	Al-Ittihad Alexandria	8	(1)
2019-2019	El Raja SC		
2019-2021	Tanta SC		

International career
2014	Egypt	3	(0)
- * Club domestic league appearances and goals

Shawky El Said, sometimes addressed by his nickname 'Kaboo', is an Egyptian football player. He has made his debut under Shawky Gharib on 5 March 2014 in a friendly game against Bosnia.

== Honours ==
=== Club ===
Zamalek

- Egypt Cup: 2016
- Egyptian Super Cup: 2016
