= Hussein El Sayed =

Egyptian footballer (born 1991)

Hussein El Sayed حُسَيْن السَّيِّد
Personal information
- Full name: Hussein El Sayed Hussein Ali
- Date of birth: 18 September 1991 (age 35)
- Place of birth: Minya, Egypt
- Height: 1.71 m (5 ft 7 in)
- Position: Left-back

Team information
- Current team: Ceramica Cleopatra FC
- Number: 27

Youth career
- Al-Ahly

Senior career*
Years	Team	Apps	(Gls)
2009–2011	Al-Ahly	1	(0)
2012–2014	Misr El-Makasa	26	(3)
2014–2020	Al-Ahly	46	(4)
2018–2019	→ Al-Ettifaq (loan)	35	(3)
2020	→ CS Sfaxien (loan)	5	(0)
2020–2021	Tala'ea El Gaish	4	(0)
2021	Ismaily (loan)	14	(1)
2021–2022	Pyramids	25	(1)
2022–2024	Al Masry	51	(0)
2024–	Ceramica Cleopatra FC	26	(0)

International career
2014–2015	Egypt	2	(0)
- * Club domestic league appearances and goals

Hussein El Sayed Hussein Ali (Arabic: حُسَيْن السَّيِّد حُسَيْن عَلِيّ; 18 September 1991) is an Egyptian football player currently playing for Egyptian Premier League club Ceramica Cleopatra FC.

== Club career ==
El Sayed started his career with Al-Ahly, then he played for Misr El-Makasa, before returning to Al-Ahly where he was loaned out to Saudi club Al-Ettifaq and Tunisian club CS Sfaxien. In October 2020, he decided to join Tala'ea El Gaish.

== International career ==
El Sayed has made his debut for the Egyptian national team under Shawky Gharib on 4 June 2014 in a friendly game against Jamaica.

== Statistics ==
Last update 21 July 2017

=== With Clubs ===
Club	Season	League		Cup		Continental		Others		Total	
Club	Season	Apps	Goals	Apps	Goals	Apps	Goals	Apps	Goals	Apps	Goals
Al-Ahly	2010–11	1	0	0	0	0	0	0	0	1	0
Al-Ahly	Total	1	0	0	0	0	0	0	0	1	0
Misr El-Makasa	2011–12 (Loan)	4	0	0	0	—				4	0
Misr El-Makasa	2012–13	9	0	0	0	—				9	0
Misr El-Makasa	2013–14	12	2	1	0	—				13	2
Misr El-Makasa	Total	25	2	1	0	—				26	2
Al-Ahly	2014–15	15	1	4	2	5	0	1	0	25	3
Al-Ahly	2015–16	7	0	2	0	1	0	1	0	11	0
Al-Ahly	2016–17	4	0	0	0	1	0	0	0	5	0
Al-Ahly	2017–18	0	0	0	0	0	0	0	0	0	0
Al-Ahly	Total	26	1	6	2	7	0	2	0	41	3
