= Saad Samir =

Egyptian footballer (born 1989)

Personal information
- Full name: Saad El-Din Samir Saad Ali
- Date of birth: 1 April 1989 (age 37)
- Place of birth: Benha, Qalyubia, Egypt
- Height: 1.85 m (6 ft 1 in)
- Position: Centre back

Youth career
- Al Ahly

Senior career*
| Years | Team | Apps | (Gls) |
| 2009–2023 | Al Ahly | 134 | (13) |
| 2010–2011 | → El Mokawloon (loan) | 14 | (0) |
| 2011–2012 | → Al-Masry (loan) | 12 | (0) |
| 2021–2023 | → Modern Sport FC (loan) | 37 | (1) |
| 2023–2026 | Ceramica Cleopatra FC | 32 | (2) |

International career^{‡}
| 2009–2011 | Egypt U20 | 6 | (0) |
| 2012 | Egypt U23 | 20 | (0) |
| 2014–2018 | Egypt | 13 | (0) |
- * Club domestic league appearances and goals as of 18 ِAugust 2024 ‡ National team caps and goals as of 18 ِAugust 2024

Saad El-Din Samir Saad Ali (Arabic: سَعْد الدِّين سَمِير سَعْد عَلِيّ; born 1 April 1989), simply known as Saad Samir, is an Egyptian former footballer who played as a defender. He has competed at the 2012 Summer Olympics.

== Career ==
Samir began playing football in the Al Ahly youth system. However, he left the club for Ittihad El Shorta SC and Al-Nasr SC (Benghazi) before returning to Al Ahly in 2009. After a couple of loan spells with El Mokawloon SC and Al-Masry SC, Samir became a key part of Al Ahly's defense.

In May 2018 he was named in Egypt's preliminary squad for the 2018 FIFA World Cup in Russia.

== Honours and achievements ==
=== Club ===
==== Al Ahly ====
- Egyptian Premier League: 2009–10, 2013–14, 2015–16, 2016–17, 2017–18, 2018–19, 2019-20
- Egypt Cup: 2017, 2019–20
- Egyptian Super Cup: 2011, 2014, 2015, 2017, 2018
- CAF Champions League: 2012, 2013, 2019–20, 2020-21
- CAF Confederation Cup: 2014
- CAF Super Cup: 2013, 2014
- FIFA Club World Cup: Third-Place 2020

==== Modern Sport ====
- Egyptian League Cup: 2021-2022

==== Ceramica Cleopatra ====
- Egyptian League Cup: 2023-2024
