= Sabri Raheel =

Egyptian footballer (born 1987)

Personal information
- Full name: Sabri El-Sayed Abdalmotteleb Mayhoub Raheel
- Date of birth: 2 October 1987 (age 39)
- Place of birth: Sanhour El Beheira, Faiyum, Egypt
- Height: 1.71 m (5 ft 7 in)
- Position: Left-back

Team information
- Current team: El Gouna FC
- Number: 6

Youth career
- Misr El Makasa

Senior career*
Years	Team	Apps	(Gls)
2007–2009	Misr El Makasa		
2009–2013	Zamalek	47	(1)
2013–2019	Al Ahly	79	(0)
2019–2023	Al Ittihad Alexandria	92	(0)
2019–2019	Pyramids FC (loan)	4	(0)
2023-	El Gouna FC (loan)	18	(1)

International career
2014–	Egypt	6	(0)
- * Club domestic league appearances and goals

Sabri El-Sayed Abdalmonteleb Mayhoub Raheel (Arabic: صبري السيد عبدالمطلب ميهوب رحيل; born on 2 October 1987) is an Egyptian professional footballer who plays as a left-back for Egyptian Premier League side Al Ittihad Alexandria. He also played for Al Ahly Zamalek.

== Honours ==
Zamalek

- Egypt Cup: 2013

Al Ahly

- Egyptian Premier League: 2013–14, 2015–16, 2016–17, 2017–18, 2018–19
- Egypt Cup: 2017
- Egyptian Super Cup: 2014, 2015, 2017
- CAF Champions League: 2013
- CAF Super Cup: 2014
- CAF Confederation Cup: 2014
