= Ahmed Abd El-Zaher =

Egyptian footballer (born 1985)

Personal information
- Date of birth: 15 January 1985 (age 41)
- Place of birth: Gharbia, Egypt
- Height: 1.82 m (6 ft 0 in)
- Position: Forward

Senior career*
Years	Team	Apps	(Gls)
2005–2013	ENPPI	77	(25)
2013–2016	Al-Ahly	34	(8)
2014	→ Al-Ittihad Tripoli (loan)		
2016	→ ENPPI (loan)	13	(3)
2016–2018	El Makkasa	50	(7)
2018–2019	Haras El Hodoud	2	(0)
2019–2021	Aswan	12	(2)

International career
2005	Egypt U20	3	(0)
2010–2011	Egypt	10	(2)
- * Club domestic league appearances and goals

Ahmed Abd El-Zaher (Arabic: أحمد عبد الظاهر; born 15 January 1985) is an Egyptian former professional footballer who played as a forward. He was part of the Egypt U20 national team which participated in the 2005 FIFA World Youth Championship.

== Club career ==
Abd El-Zaher had a modest showing during the beginning of the 2009–10 Egyptian Premier League. That completely changed when head coach Stoycho Mladenov took control at ENPPI. Abd El-Zaher saw more regular first team football and repaid his manager faith by scoring 5 league goals by the end of that season. Mladenov then left to Bulgarian CSKA Sofia and Mokhtar Mokhtar then took over the team in the 2011–12 season. Abd El-Zaher finished that season as top scorer of the league tied with Zamalek's Shikabala. They both had 13 goals. Early in 2012, Mladenov made a request to ENPPI to move Abd El-Zaher to his club CSKA Sofia in the 2012 summer transfer window. The move was possible but ENPPI were somewhat reluctant to lose one of their top strikers. In January 2013, he moved to league rivals Al-Ahly on a four-year deal. In November 2013, Abd El-Zaher was deprived of his Champions League win bonus, suspended and put up for sale in the January transfer window for doing a Rabia sign in support of recently deposed President Mohamed Morsi after scoring a goal. On 5 December 2013, the Egyptian Football Association took sanctions a step further, announcing that Abd El-Zaher has been banned from representing Egypt for one year in addition to a three-month local ban. He moved to Al-Ittihad Club (Tripoli) on loan from Al-Ahly in December 2013 as punishment for the Rabia sign.

He ruptured his anterior cruciate ligament in 2019.

== International career ==
Abd El-Zaher was part of the Egypt U20 national team which participated in the 2005 FIFA World Youth Championship. He participated in all of Egypt's three group matches, but did not score any goals.

== Career statistics ==
Correct as of 27 November 2012

#	Date	Venue	Opponent	Score	Result	Competition
1.	17 November 2010	Cairo International Stadium, Cairo, Egypt	Australia	1 – 0	3 – 0	Friendly
2.	27 November 2012	Al-Gharafa Stadium, Dubai, Qatar	Kenya	5 – 0	5 – 0	Friendly
