= Mohamed Rizk =

Egyptian footballer (born 1988)

Personal information
- Full name: Mohamed Rizk
- Date of birth: 25 January 1988 (age 38)
- Place of birth: Cairo, Egypt
- Height: 1.77 m (5 ft 10 in)
- Position: Attacking midfielder

Team information
- Current team: Asoan

Youth career
- El Shams

Senior career*
Years	Team	Apps	(Gls)
2012–2014	Arab Contractors SC	31	(3)
2014–	Al Ahly	25	(1)
2015–	→ El-Geish (loan)	31	(4)

International career
- Egypt
- * Club domestic league appearances and goals

Mohamed Rizk (Arabic: مُحَمَّد رِزْق; born 25 January 1988) is an Egyptian footballer who plays as an attacking midfielder for El-Geish in the Egyptian Premier League on loan from Al Ahly. In 2013, he played for Al Mokawloon Al Arab SC.
