= Mohamed Naguib (footballer) =

Egyptian footballer (born 1983)

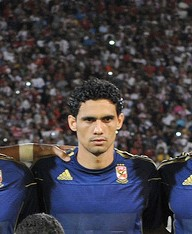
- Naguib with Al Ahly in 2011

Personal information
- Full name: Mohamed Nasser Naguib
- Date of birth: January 31, 1983 (age 43)
- Place of birth: Mansoura, Egypt
- Height: 1.84 m (6 ft 0 in)
- Position: Centre back

Senior career*
Years	Team	Apps	(Gls)
2003–2009	Baladeyet El-Mahalla	6	(0)
2009–2011	Ittihad El-Shorta	64	(3)
2011–2017	Al-Ahly	108	(1)
2019–2022	El Gouna	16	(0)
2022–2024	El Dakhleya	31	(0)

International career
2010–2014	Egypt	16	(0)
- * Club domestic league appearances and goals as of 30 Aug 19

Mohamed Nasser Naguib (Arabic: محمد ناصر نجيب) is an Egyptian footballer. He currently plays as a centre back for El Dakhleya.

== Club career ==
Naguib started his career with Baladeyet El-Mahalla, then he played for Ittihad El-Shorta, Al-Ahly and El Gouna.

== International career ==
He has been called up for Egyptian national team for the CAN 2012 qualifier against Niger on October 10, 2010.
