= 2015 Egyptian Super Cup =

2015–16 Egyptian Super Cup
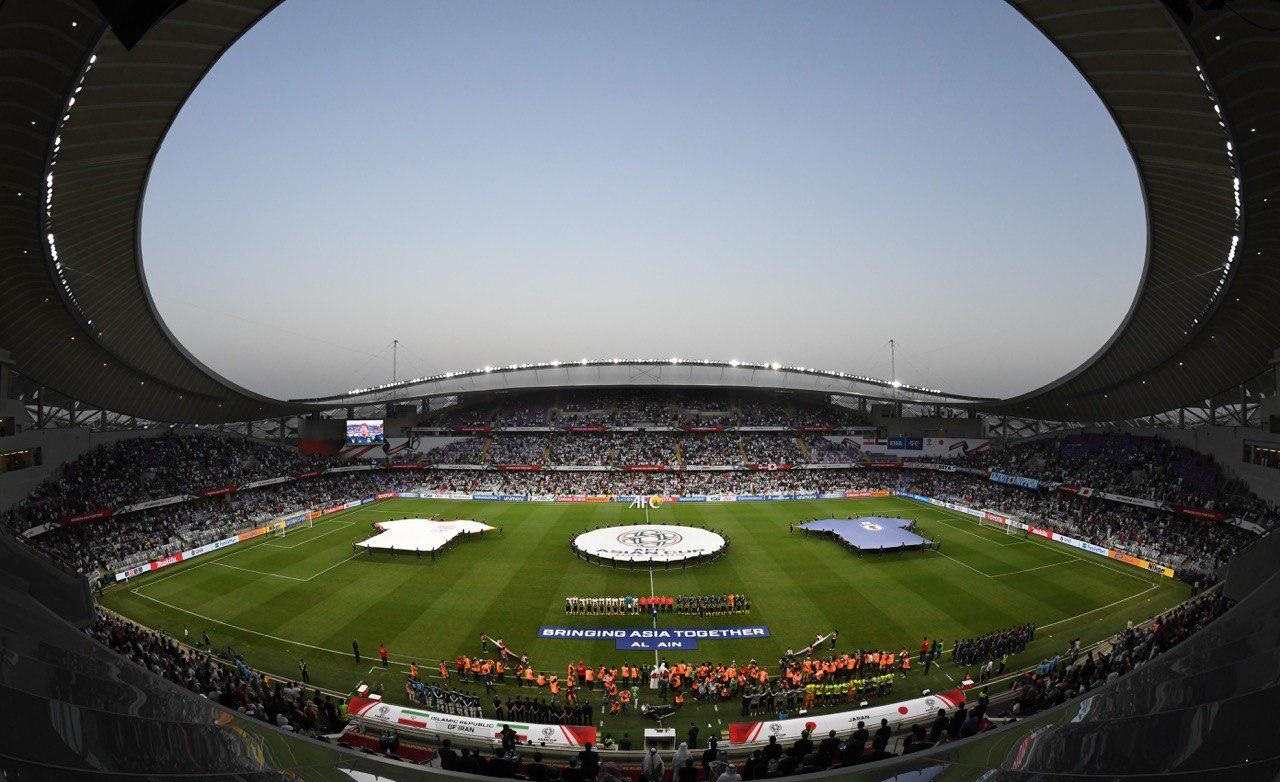
- Hazza Bin Zayed stadium hosted the match
Zamalek	Al Ahly
2	3
- Date: 15 October 2015
- Venue: Hazza bin Zayed Stadium, Al Ain
- Referee: Carlos Carballo (Spain)
- Attendance: 25,000
- Weather: Partly cloudy 33 °C (91 °F); 46% humidity

The 2015 Egyptian Super Cup was the 13th edition of the Egyptian Super Cup, an annual football match between the winners of the previous season's Egyptian Premier League and Egypt Cup. The match is usually contested by the winners of the Premier League and the Egypt Cup, but since Zamalek won the double (2014–15 Egyptian Premier League and 2015 Egypt Cup), Al Ahly qualified by default as the runners-up in both occasions. The match was played for the first time on international soil at the Hazza Bin Zayed Stadium in Al Ain, United Arab Emirates, making it the first African super cup to be staged outside its home country and continent.

== Match details ==
15 October 2015
20:00 (UTC+4)

Zamalek	2–3	Al Ahly
Gaber 26'; Kahraba 90+1'	Report	Said 45+5' (pen.), 54' (pen.); M. Zakaria 69'

Hazza Bin Zayed Stadium, Al Ain
Attendance: 25,000
Referee: Carlos Carballo (Spain)
