= 2017–18 Al Ahly SC season =

Al Ahly
2017–18 season
- Chairman: (Egypt) Mahmoud Taher (until 1 December) (Egypt) Mahmoud El Khatib (from 1 December)
- Manager: (Egypt) Hossam El-Badry (until 15 May 2018) (Egypt) Ahmed Ayoub (interim manager as from 15 May 2018)
- Stadium: Cairo Stadium
- Egyptian Premier League: Champion
- Egyptian Super Cup: Champion
- Egypt Cup: Quarter final
- 2017 CAF Champions League: Runner-up
- 2018 CAF Champions League: Group Stage (on-going)
Home colours colours	Away colours colours	Third colours colours

The 2017–18 Al Ahly SC season was the 59th edition in the Egyptian Premier League. The club participated in the Egyptian Premier League, Egypt Cup, 2017-18 Champions Golden Cup, Egyptian Super Cup and finish the 2017 CAF Champions League campaign and start the 2018 campaign.

== Squad ==
=== Current squad ===
Squad No.	Name	Nationality	Position(s)	Date of Birth (Age)
Goalkeepers
1	Sherif Ekramy (third-captain)	(Egypt)	GK	1 July 1983 (age 43)
16	Mohamed El Shenawy	(Egypt)	GK	18 December 1988 (age 37)
13	Ali Lotfi	(Egypt)	GK	14 October 1989 (age 37)
Centerbacks
3	Ramy Rabia	(Egypt)	CB	20 May 1993 (age 33)
20	Saad Samir	(Egypt)	CB	1 April 1989 (age 37)
23	Mohamed Naguib	(Egypt)	CB	13 January 1983 (age 43)
Fullbacks
6	Sabry Raheel	(Egypt)	LB	2 October 1987 (age 39)
26	Basem Ali	(Egypt)	RB	27 October 1988 (age 38)
21	Ali Maâloul	(Tunisia)	LB	1 January 1990 (age 36)
24	Ahmed Fathy	(Egypt)	RB / DM	10 November 1984 (age 42)
12	Ayman Ashraf	(Egypt)	LB	9 April 1991 (age 35)
30	Mohamed Hany	(Egypt)	RB	25 January 1996 (age 30)
Defensive midfielders
4	Hesham Mohamed	(Egypt)	DM	3 January 1990 (age 36)
17	Amr El Soleya	(Egypt)	DM	4 February 1990 (age 36)
25	Hossam Ashour (vice-captain)	(Egypt)	DM	9 March 1986 (age 40)
38	Akram Tawfik	(Egypt)	DM	8 November 1997 (age 29)
14	Hossam Ghaly(captain)	(Egypt)	MF	15 December 1981 (age 44)
Attacking midfielders
34	Ahmed Hamdy	(Egypt)	AM	10 February 1998 (age 28)
35	Karim Nedvěd	(Egypt)	AM	8 August 1998 (age 28)
33	Moahmed Fakhri	(Egypt)	AM	4 March 1999 (age 27)
Wingers
11	Walid Soliman	(Egypt)	RW	1 December 1984 (age 41)
7	Ahmed Hamoudi	(Egypt)	RW	30 July 1990 (age 36)
5	Islam Mohareb	(Egypt)	RW	1 January 1992 (age 34)
27	Mido Gaber	(Egypt)	RW	9 May 1995 (age 31)
15	Mohamed Sheref	(Egypt)	RW/LW	4 February 1996 (age 30)
28	Junior Ajayi	(Nigeria)	LW	29 January 1996 (age 30)
32	Phakamani Mahlambi	(South Africa)	LW	12 September 1997 (age 29)
Strikers
9	Walid Azaro	(Morocco)	ST	11 June 1995 (age 31)
18	Marwan Mohsen	(Egypt)	ST	26 February 1989 (age 37)
39	Ahmed Yasser Rayyan	(Egypt)	ST	1 January 1998 (age 28)
37	Salah Mohsen	(Egypt)	ST	1 September 1998 (age 28)

== Transfers ==
=== Transfers in ===
Date from	Position	Nationality	Name	From	Fee
July 2017	AM	(Egypt)	Islam Mohareb	Smouha	9M EGP
July 2017	DM	(Egypt)	Hesham Mohamed	Misr Lel Makassa	8M EGP
July 2017	LB	(Egypt)	Ayman Ashraf	Smouha	Free
July 2017	ST	(Morocco)	Walid Azaro	Difaâ El Jadidi	23M EGP
July 2017	LW	(South Africa)	Phakamani Mahlambi	Bidvest Wits	23M EGP
July 2017	CB	(Syria)	Abdullah Al Shami	Al-Safa'	Free
January 2018	AM	(Egypt)	Moahmed Fakhri	Ghazl El Mahalla	1.8M EGP
January 2018	GK	(Egypt)	Ali Lotfi	Enppi	2.5M EGP
January 2018	ST	(Egypt)	Salah Mohsen	Enppi	30M EGP
January 2018	RW/LW	(Egypt)	Mohamed Sheref	Wadi Degla FC	10M EGP
January 2018	MF	(Egypt)	Hossam Ghaly	Al-Nassr FC	Free

=== Transfers out ===
Date from	Position	Nationality	Name	To	Fee
July 2017	ST	(Egypt)	Mohamed Hamdy Zaky	Smouha	1M EGP
July 2017	GK	(Egypt)	Mossad Awad	Smouha	Free
July 2017	DM	(Egypt)	Hossam Ghaly	Al-Nassr FC	Free
July 2017	AM	(Egypt)	Islam El Far	Tanta SC	Free
December 2017	CB	(Egypt)	Ahmed Hegazy	West Bromwich Albion	£4.5m
January 2018	CB	(Syria)	Abdullah Al Shami	Al-Masry SC	Free
January 2018	GK	(Egypt)	Ahmed Adel	Misr Lel Makkasa	1M EGP

=== Loans out ===
Date from	Position	Nationality	Name	To	Date until
July 2017	ST	(Egypt)	Amr Gamal	Bidvest Wits	July 2018
July 2017	ST	(Ghana)	John Antwi	Misr Lel-Makkasa SC	July 2018
July 2017	LW	(Egypt)	Nasser Maher	Smouha SC	July 2018
January 2018	ST	(Egypt)	Emad Moteab	Al-Taawoun FC	July 2018
January 2018	MF	(Egypt)	Ahmed El Sheikh	Ettifaq FC	July 2018
January 2018	LW	(Egypt)	Moamen Zakaria	Al-Ahli Saudi FC	July 2018
January 2018	LB	(Egypt)	Hussein El Sayed	Ettifaq FC	July 2019
January 2018	AM	(Egypt)	Amr Barakat	Al Shabab FC	July 2019
January 2018	AM	(Egypt)	Saleh Gomaa	Al-Faisaly FC	July 2019
April 2018	AM	(Egypt)	Abdallah Said	KuPs	July 2018

=== Suspensions ===
Date from	Position	Nationality	Name	Date until	Reason
July 2017	ST	(Ivory Coast)	Souleymane Coulibaly	unknown	leave without permission, case reported to FIFA

== Statistics ==
=== Squad appearances and goals ===
Last updated on 24 May 2018

No.	Pos	Nat	Player	Total		Egyptian Premier league		Champions League		Egypt Cup	
No.	Pos	Nat	Player	Apps	Goals	Apps	Goals	Apps	Goals	Apps	Goals
Goalkeepers
1	GK	(Egypt) EGY	Sherif Ekramy	7	0	7	0	0	0	0	0
16	GK	(Egypt) EGY	Mohamed El-Shenawy	30	0	23	0	4	0	3	0
13	GK	(Egypt) EGY	Ali Lotfi	2	0	2	0	0	0	0	0
Defenders
3	DF	(Egypt) EGY	Ramy Rabia	6	0	6	0	0	0	0	0
6	DF	(Egypt) EGY	Sabri Raheel	21	0	17	0	2	0	2	0
12	DF	(Egypt) EGY	Ayman Ashraf	35	2	29	2	3	0	3	0
20	DF	(Egypt) EGY	Saad Samir	19	4	15	4	3	0	1	0
21	DF	(Tunisia) TUN	Ali Maâloul	15	0	13	0	2	0	0	0
24	DF	(Egypt) EGY	Ahmed Fathy	28	1	24	1	3	0	1	0
23	DF	(Egypt) EGY	Mohamed Nagieb	19	0	15	0	2	0	2	0
25	DF	(Egypt) EGY	Mohamed Hany	24	1	19	1	3	0	2	0
26	DF	(Egypt) EGY	Basem Ali	9	1	8	1	0	0	1	0
Midfielders
4	MF	(Egypt) EGY	Hesham Mohamed	15	1	12	0	1	0	2	1
14	MF	(Egypt) EGY	Hossam Ghaly	5	0	4	0	0	0	1	0
17	MF	(Egypt) EGY	Amr Elsolia	37	4	30	2	4	0	3	2
19	MF	(Egypt) EGY	Abdallah Said	22	12	21	10	1	2	0	0
25	MF	(Egypt) EGY	Hossam Ashour	28	0	22	0	4	0	2	0
34	MF	(Egypt) EGY	Ahmed Hamdi	9	2	7	1	1	0	1	1
35	MF	(Egypt) EGY	Karim Nedved	10	1	9	1	1	0	0	0
38	MF	(Egypt) EGY	Akram Tawfik	4	0	4	0	0	0	0	0
Forwards
5	FW	(Egypt) EGY	Islam Mohareb	31	5	24	4	4	0	3	1
7	FW	(Egypt) EGY	Ahmed Hamoudi	11	1	10	1	0	0	1	0
8	FW	(Egypt) EGY	Mohamed Sheref	3	0	3	0	0	0	0	0
9	FW	(Morocco) MAR	Walid Azaro	33	21	30	18	2	2	1	1
11	FW	(Egypt) EGY	Walid Soliman	26	9	20	8	4	1	2	0
18	FW	(Egypt) EGY	Marwan Mohsen	11	4	7	3	3	1	1	0
27	FW	(Egypt) EGY	Mohamed Gaber	10	2	6	1	3	1	1	0
28	FW	(Nigeria) NGR	Junior Ajayi	31	9	27	9	1	0	3	0
32	FW	(South Africa) RSA	Phakamani Mahlambi	15	1	12	1	2	0	1	0
37	FW	(Egypt) EGY	Salah Mohsen	10	2	7	2	3	0	0	0
39	FW	(Egypt) EGY	Ahmed Yasser Rayyan	5	0	4	0	0	0	1	0

=== Squad statistics ===
	League	Africa	Cup	Total Stats
Games played	34	3	4	41
Games won	28	2	2	32
Games drawn	4	0	1	4
Games lost	2	1	1	4
Goals scored	75	7	7	89
Goals conceded	19	1	3	23
Goal difference	56	6	4	66
Clean sheets	19	1	2	22

== Friendlies ==
30 Dec 2017	Al Ahly (Egypt)	2–3	(Spain) Atlético Madrid	Borg El Arab Stadium, Alexandria, Egypt
	Moamen Zakaria 40'; Ahmed El Sheikh 52'		Kevin Gameiro 64' 73' 81'	Attendance: 50,000

2 February 2018	Al-Shabab FC (Saudi Arabia)	0–1	(Egypt) Al Ahly	Prince Faisal bin Fahd Stadium, Riyadh, Saudi Arabia
			Phakamani Mahlambi 34'	Attendance: 15,000

27 March 2018	Al-Fujairah SC (United Arab Emirates)	1–4	(Egypt) Al Ahly	Fujairah Club Stadium, Fujairah, UAE
	Danilo 63'		Mohareb 17' 61' 68'; Ghaly 56'	Attendance: 5,000

11 May 2018 Champions Golden Cup	Al Ahly (Egypt)	1–0	(Netherlands) Ajax	Hazza bin Zayed Stadium, Al Ain, UAE
	Mohsen 83'	Report		Attendance: 10,000

== 2017 Egyptian Super Cup ==
12 January 2018
20:00 GST

Al Ahly	1–0 (a.e.t.)	Al Masry
Azaro 101'	Report

Hazza Bin Zayed Stadium, Al Ain
Attendance: 18,000
Referee: Ammar Al Junaibi (United Arab Emirates)

Al-Ahly	Al Masry

GK	16	(Egypt) Mohamed El Shenawy
LB	21	(Tunisia) Ali Maâloul
CB	12	(Egypt) Ayman Ashraf
CB	20	(Egypt) Saad Samir	(yellow card) 54'
RB	24	(Egypt) Ahmed Fathy	(yellow card) 21'
CM	25	(Egypt) Hossam Ashour (c)	(yellow card) 107'
CM	14	(Egypt) Amr El Solia	(yellow card) 120'
AM	19	(Egypt) Abdallah Said		(substituted off) 120+2'
LW	28	(Nigeria) Junior Ajayi		(substituted off) 97'
RW	11	(Egypt) Walid Soliman		(substituted off) 83'
CF	9	(Morocco) Walid Azaro	(yellow card) 57'
Substitutes:
GK	1	(Egypt) Sherif Ekramy
DF	30	(Egypt) Mohamed Hany
MF	8	(Egypt) Moamen Zakaria		(substituted on) 83'
MF	35	(Egypt) Karim Nedvěd		(substituted on) 120+2'
FW	5	(Egypt) Islam Mohareb		(substituted on) 97'
FW	17	(Egypt) Ahmed Hamoudi
FW	18	(Egypt) Marwan Mohsen
Manager:
(Egypt) Hossam El Badry

GK	26	(Egypt) Ahmed Buska
LB	19	(Egypt) Mohamed Hamdy	(yellow card) 15'
CB	4	(Burkina Faso) Mohamed Koffi
CB	24	(Egypt) Ahmed Gouda
RB	32	(Egypt) Karim El Iraqi
CM	5	(Egypt) Farid Shawky		(substituted off) 115'
CM	7	(Egypt) Islam Issa
AM	10	(Egypt) Walid Hassan		(substituted off) 108'
LW	21	(Egypt) Mohamed Grendo
RW	25	(Egypt) Ahmed Shoukry		(substituted off) 72'
CF	15	(Egypt) Ahmed Gomaa (c)
Substitutes:
GK	16	(Egypt) Mahmoud El Sayed
DF	13	(Egypt) Islam Saleh		(substituted on) 115'
DF	35	(Syria) Abdullah Al Shami
MF	8	(Egypt) Amr Moussa		(substituted on) 72'
MF	12	(Egypt) Mostafa Ali
MF	28	(Egypt) Mohamed Abou Shaeshaa
FW	20	(Burkina Faso) Issouf Ouattara		(substituted on) 108'
Manager:
(Egypt) Hossam Hassan

Match officials:

- Assistant referees:
  - Ahmed Al Rashdi (United Arab Emirates)
  - Jassim Abdullah (United Arab Emirates)
- Fourth official: Hamad Ali Youssef (United Arab Emirates)

Match rules

- 90 minutes.
- 30 minutes of extra time if necessary.
- Penalty shoot-out if scores still level.
- Seven named substitutes, of which up to three may be used.

== 2017–18 Egyptian Premier League ==
=== Position ===
Pos	Team	Pld	W	D	L	GF	GA	GD	Pts	Qualification or relegation
1	Al Ahly (C)	34	28	4	2	75	19	+56	88	Qualification for the Champions League
2	Ismaily	34	19	11	4	50	27	+23	68	Qualification for the Champions League
3	Al Masry	34	18	9	7	52	34	+18	63	Qualification for the Confederation Cup (Note: Zamalek qualified for the Confederation Cup by winning the 2017–18 Egypt Cup.)
4	Zamalek	34	18	7	9	45	30	+15	61	Qualification for the Confederation Cup
5	Smouha	34	14	9	11	37	26	+11	51	

Source: Soccerway
Rules for classification: 1) Points; 2) Head-to-Head points; 3) Head-to-Head goal difference; 4) Head-to-Head goal scored; 5) Head-to-Head away goal scored; 6) Goal difference; 7) Goal scored.
(C) Champions

=== Results ===
==== Results by round ====
Round	1	2	3	4	5	6	7	8	9	10	11	12	13	14	15	16	17	18	19	20	21	22	23	24	25	26	27	28	29	30	31	32	33	34
Ground	H	A	H	A	H	A	H	A	A	H	A	H	A	H	A	H	A	A	H	A	H	A	H	A	H	H	A	H	A	H	A	H	A	H
Result	D	L	W	W	W	W	W	W	W	W	W	W	D	W	D	W	W	W	W	W	W	W	W	W	W	W	W	W	W	W	D	W	W	L
Position	10	12	14	16	7	1	13	14	6	4	3	2	2	2	2	2	2	1	1	1	1	1	1	1	1	1	1	1	1	1	1	1	1	1

Updated to match(es) played on 16 January 2018. Source:
A = Away; H = Home; W = Win; D = Draw; L = Loss

==== Match details ====
10 September 2017 1	Al Ahly	1–1	Tala'ea Al Geish	Al Salam Stadium, Cairo
20:15 UTC+2	El Sheikh 57'		Asem 35' (pen.)

10 December 2017 2	Misr Lel Makassa	3–2	Al Ahly	Suez Stadium, Suez
19:00 UTC+2	El Shahat 24'; Voavy 64'; Antwi 73'		Abdallah 45+1' (pen.); Azaro 74'

16 October 2017 3	Al Ahly	4–1	Al Raga'	Al Salam Stadium, Cairo
19:00 UTC+2	Fathy 7'; Mo'men 20'; Ajayi 44'; Saad 59'		Oka 54'

20 November 2017 4	Ismaily	0–2	Al Ahly	Borg El Arab Stadium, Alexandria
19:00 UTC+2			El Soleya 74'; Abdallah 82'

12 October 2017 5	Al Ahly	2–0	Al Ittihad	Al Salam Stadium, Cairo
20:00 UTC+2	Ajayi 44'; Hussein 79'

8 February 2018 6	Al Mokawloon	0–3	Al Ahly	Petro Sport Stadium, Cairo
19:00 UTC+2			Mahlambi 8'; Azaro 25'; Abdallah 90'

6 December 2017 7	Al Ahly	1–0	Al Assiouty	Cairo Stadium, Cairo
19:00 UTC+2	Abdallah 53'

2 January 2018 8	Al Nasr	0–4	Al Ahly	Cairo Stadium, Cairo
19:00 UTC+2	Ashraf 12'; Soliman 37' (pen.); Azaro 87' (pen.); Mohareb 90'

16 November 2017 9	Al Intag Al Harby	1–2	Al Ahly	Al Salam Stadium, Cairo
20:00 UTC+2	El Said 45+2' (pen.)		Azaro 14' 77'

24 November 2017 10	Al Ahly	2–0	Al Dakhelya	Cairo Stadium, Cairo
20:00 UTC+2	Azaro 16'; Saad 86'

28 November 2017 11	Al Masry	0–2	Al Ahly	Borg El Arab Stadium, Alexandria
20:00 UTC+2			Azaro 34'; Soliman 70'

2 December 2017 12	Al Ahly	4–1	Enppi	Cairo Stadium, Cairo
20:00 UTC+2	Saad 28'; Ajayi 39'; Azaro 54'; El Sheikh 90+3'		Mohsen 43'

15 December 2017 13	Tanta	1–1	Al Ahly	El Mahalla Stadium, Mahalla
17:00 UTC+2	Ashraf 60' (o.g.)		Azaro 42'

20 December 2017 14	Al Ahly	2–1	Smouha	Cairo Stadium, Cairo
20:00 UTC+2	Abdallah 42'; Mohareb 65'		Diawara 50'

26 December 2017 15	Wadi Degla	1–1	Al Ahly	Petro Sport Stadium, Cairo
19:00 UTC+2	Ahmed El Shenawy 62'		Abdallah 61' (pen.)

29 December 2017 16	Al Ahly	3–0	Petrojet	Cairo Stadium, Cairo
19:00 UTC+2	Soliman 61'; Abdallah 77' 81' (pen.)

8 January 2018 17	Zamalek	0–3	Al Ahly	Cairo Stadium, Cairo
19:00 UTC+2			Mo'men 3'; Abdallah 42' (pen.); Azaro 53'

16 January 2018 18	Tala'ea Al Geish	0–2	Al Ahly	30 June Stadium, Cairo
20:00 UTC+2			Gaber 38'; El Soleya 78'

20 January 2018 19	Al Ahly	2–1	Misr Lel Makassa	Cairo Stadium, Cairo
20:00 UTC+2	Ajayi 65'; Soliman 84'		Antwi 27' (pen.)

25 January 2018 20	Al Raga'	1–3	Al Ahly	Alexandria Stadium, Alexandria
14:30 UTC+2	Nasser 40'		Azaro 51'; Basem 60'; Mohareb 73'

30 January 2018 21	Al Ahly	1–0	Ismaily	Borg El Arab Stadium, Alexandria
20:00 UTC+2	Soliman 90+1'

3 February 2018 22	Al Ittihad	0–3	Al Ahly	Borg El Arab Stadium, Alexandria
19:30 UTC+2			Azaro 40'; Abdallah 77'; Ajayi 82'

12 February 2018 23	Al Ahly	5–2	Al Mokawloon	Cairo Stadium, Cairo
18:00 UTC+2	Azaro 7' 90+4'; Ajayi 16' 84'; Mohareb 90+2'		Farouk 45+2'; Kamel 55' (pen.)

15 February 2018 24	Al Assiouty	0–1	Al Ahly	Borg El Arab Stadium, Alexandria
14:30 UTC+2			Soliman 70' (pen.)

19 February 2018 25	Al Ahly	5–0	Al Nasr	Cairo Stadium, Cairo
20:00 UTC+2	Azaro 16' (pen.) 33'; Hany 43'; Mohsen 49'; Karim Nedvěd 90+1'

24 February 2018 26	Al Ahly	2–1	Al Intag Al Harby	Cairo Stadium, Cairo
20:00 UTC+2	Hamoudi 10'; Ajayi 77'		Kamar 13'

28 February 2018 27	Al Dakhelya	0–3	Al Ahly	Petro Sport Stadium, Cairo
18:00 UTC+2			Mohsen 65'; Soliman 76'; Azaro 86'

22 April 2018 28	Al Ahly	2–0	Al Masry	Borg El Arab Stadium, Alexandria
22:00 UTC+2	Hamdy 18'; Mohsen 74'

11 March 2018 29	Enppi	0–1	Al Ahly	Petro Sport Stadium, Cairo
19:00 UTC+2			Ashraf 3'

2 April 2018 30	Al Ahly	2–1	Tanta	Cairo Stadium, Cairo
20:30 UTC+2	Ajayi 61'; Mohsen 86'		Gaber 90+1'

8 April 2018 31	Smouha	0–0	Al Ahly	Borg El Arab Stadium, Alexandria
19:30 UTC+2

17 April 2018 32	Al Ahly	1–0	Wadi Degla	Cairo Stadium, Cairo
17:30 UTC+2	Azaro 24'

22 April 2018 33	Petrojet	1–2	Al Ahly	Suez Stadium, Suez
18:00 UTC+2	Omar 78'		Saad 22'; Mohsen 55'

26 April 2018 34	Al Ahly	1–2	Zamalek	Cairo Stadium, Cairo
20:00 UTC+2	Soliman 71' (pen.)		Kasongo 6'; Hefny 21'

== 2018 Egypt Cup ==
=== First round ===
10 November 2017	Telephonat Beni Suef SC	0–5	Al Ahly	Petro Sport Stadium, Cairo
19:30 UTC+2			Hesham 20'; El Soleya 23'; Azaro 44'; Meteab 57' (pen.); Hamdy 82'

=== Round of 16 ===
13 April 2018	Al Ahly	2–0	Al Dakhleya	Al Salam Stadium, Cairo
20:00 UTC+2	El Soleya 71'; Mohareb 84'

=== Quarter final ===
30 April 2018	Al Ahly	0–1	Al Assiouty Sport	Al Salam Stadium, Cairo
20:00 UTC+2			Kamal

== 2017 CAF Champions League ==
=== Quarter-finals ===
Team 1	Agg.	Team 2	1st leg	2nd leg
Al Ahly (Egypt)	4–3	(Tunisia) Espérance de Tunis	2–2	2–1

16 September 2017	Al Ahly (Egypt)	2–2	(Tunisia) Espérance de Tunis	Borg El Arab Stadium, Alexandria
19:00 UTC+2	Abdallah 11' (pen.); Azaro 67'	Report	Khenissi 21'; Chaalali 48'	Attendance: 25,000; Referee: Malang Diedhiou (Senegal)

23 September 2017	Espérance de Tunis (Tunisia)	1–2	(Egypt) Al Ahly	Stade Olympique de Radès, Radès
19:00 UTC+1	Khenissi 40' (pen.)	Report	Maâloul 50'; Ajayi 62'	Attendance: 40,000; Referee: Sidi Alioum (Cameroon)

=== Semi-finals ===
Team 1	Agg.	Team 2	1st leg	2nd leg
Étoile du Sahel (Tunisia)	4–7	(Egypt) Al Ahly	2–1	2–6

1 October 2017	Étoile du Sahel (Tunisia)	2–1	(Egypt) Al Ahly	Stade Olympique de Sousse, Sousse
18:30 UTC+1	Brigui 16'; Ben Amor 73'	Report	Saleh 66'	Attendance: 22,000; Referee: Eric Otogo-Castane (Gabon)

22 October 2017	Al Ahly (Egypt)	6–2	(Tunisia) Étoile du Sahel	Borg El Arab Stadium, Alexandria
19:00 UTC+2	Maâloul 2'; Azaro 23', 39', 48'; Nagguez 58' (o.g.); Ramy 63'	Report	Bedoui 51'; Msakni 90'	Attendance: 50,000; Referee: Victor Gomes (South Africa)

=== Final ===
Team 1	Agg.	Team 2	1st leg	2nd leg
Al Ahly (Egypt)	1–2	(Morocco) Wydad Casablanca	1–1	0–1

28 October 2017	Al Ahly (Egypt)	1–1	(Morocco) Wydad Casablanca	Borg El Arab Stadium, Alexandria
19:00 UTC+2	Mo'men 3'	Report	Bencharki 16'	Attendance: 60,000; Referee: Bamlak Tessema Weyesa (Ethiopia)

4 November 2017	Wydad Casablanca (Morocco)	1–0	(Egypt) Al Ahly	Stade Mohamed V, Casablanca
20:00 UTC+0	El Karti 69'	Report		Attendance: 65,000; Referee: Bakary Gassama (Gambia)

Wydad Casablanca won 2–1 on aggregate.

== 2018 CAF Champions League ==
=== First round ===
Team 1	Agg.	Team 2	1st leg	2nd leg
Al-Ahly (Egypt)	7–1	(Gabon) CF Mounana	4–0	3–1

6 March 2018	Al-Ahly (Egypt)	4–0	(Gabon) CF Mounana	Cairo International Stadium, Cairo
20:00 UTC+2	Mohsen 14'; Azaro 22'; Said 65', 69' (pen.)	Report		Attendance: 15,000; Referee: Boubou Traoré (Mali)

17 March 2018	CF Mounana (Gabon)	1–3	(Egypt) Al-Ahly	Stade d'Angondjé, Libreville
15:30 UTC+1	Massamba 43'	Report	Gaber 8'; Azaro 30'; Soliman 83'	Attendance: 1,000; Referee: Bamlak Tessema Weyesa (Ethiopia)

Al-Ahly won 7–1 on aggregate.

=== Group A ===
Pos	Team	Pld	W	D	L	GF	GA	GD	Pts	Qualification	AHL	EST	KCC	ROL
1	(Egypt) Al Ahly	6	4	1	1	9	5	+4	13	Quarter-finals	—	0–0	4–3	3–0
2	(Tunisia) Espérance de Tunis	6	3	2	1	8	4	+4	11	Quarter-finals	0–1	—	3–2	4–1
3	(Uganda) KCCA	6	2	0	4	8	9	−1	6		2–0	0–1	—	1–0
4	(Botswana) Township Rollers	6	1	1	4	2	9	−7	4		0–1	0–0	1–0	—

Source: CAF
Rules for classification: Group stage tiebreakers

4 May 2018	Al-Ahly (Egypt)	0–0	(Tunisia) Espérance de Tunis	Borg El Arab Stadium, Alexandria
21:00 UTC+2		Report		Attendance: 15,000; Referee: Malang Diedhiou (Senegal)

15 May 2018	KCCA (Uganda)	2–0	(Egypt) Al-Ahly	Mandela National Stadium, Kira
16:00 UTC+3	Juma 74'; Awany 89' (pen.)	Report		Referee: Victor Gomes (South Africa)

Note:Rest of the group stage matches were held in next season
