= 2018–19 Al Ahly SC season =

Al Ahly
2018–19 season
- President: Mahmoud El Khatib
- Manager: Patrice Carteron (until 22 November); Mohamed Youssef (caretaker, until 29 December); Martín Lasarte (until 18 August); Mohamed Youssef (caretaker, until 31 August); René Weiler (from 31 August)
- Stadium: Al Salam Stadium; Borg El Arab Stadium; Petro Sport Stadium
- Egyptian Premier League: Winners
- Egypt Cup: Round of 16
- Egyptian Super Cup: Winners
- 2018 CAF Champions League: Runners-up
- 2018–19 CAF Champions League: Quarter-finals
- Arab Club Champions Cup: Second round
- Top goalscorer: League: Ali Maâloul (8 goals); All: Walid Azaro (13 goals)
Home colours	Away colours

The 2018–19 Al Ahly SC season was the 111th edition in the football club's history and 60th consecutive and overall season in the topflight of Egyptian football, the Egyptian Premier League. In addition to the domestic league, Al Ahly also competed in this season's editions of the domestic cup, the Egypt Cup, the Egyptian Super Cup, the first-tier African cup, the CAF Champions League, and the first-tier Arab cup, the Arab Club Champions Cup. The season covered a period from 1 July 2018 to 30 June 2019; however Al Ahly played their first match of the season in March 2018 and played their last match in September 2019.

== Kit information ==
Supplier: Umbro
Sponsors: Lava, WE, GLC Paints, Uber, Tiger Chips, Royal Dutch Shell

Home	Home alt.	Away	Away alt.

== Players ==
=== Current squad ===
As of 1 February 2019

Note: Flags indicate national team as defined under FIFA eligibility rules; some limited exceptions apply. Players may hold more than one non-FIFA nationality.

No.	Pos.	Nation	Player
1	GK	EGY	Sherif Ekramy (3rd captain)
2	DF	EGY	Mahmoud Wahid
3	MF	EGY	Hamdy Fathy
4	MF	EGY	Hesham Mohamed (4th captain)
5	MF	EGY	Islam Mohareb
6	DF	EGY	Yasser Ibrahim
7	MF	EGY	Ahmed Hamoudi
9	FW	MAR	Walid Azaro
10	MF	EGY	Saleh Gomaa
11	MF	EGY	Walid Soliman
12	DF	EGY	Ayman Ashraf
13	GK	EGY	Ali Lotfi
14	MF	EGY	Hussein El Shahat
15	DF	EGY	Ahmed Alaa
16	GK	EGY	Mohamed El Shenawy (5th captain)
17	MF	EGY	Amr El Solia
18	FW	EGY	Marwan Mohsen
19	MF	EGY	Mohamed Sherif

No.	Pos.	Nation	Player
20	DF	EGY	Saad Samir
21	DF	TUN	Ali Maâloul
22	MF	EGY	Ahmed El Sheikh
23	DF	EGY	Mohamed Naguib
24	DF	EGY	Ahmed Fathy (Vice-captain)
25	MF	EGY	Hossam Ashour (Captain)
26	DF	EGY	Basem Ali
27	DF	EGY	Ramy Rabia
28	FW	NGR	Junior Ajayi
29	FW	ANG	Geraldo
30	DF	EGY	Mohamed Hany
32	FW	EGY	Ramadan Sobhi (on loan from Huddersfield Town)
33	MF	EGY	Nasser Maher
35	MF	EGY	Karim Walid
36	MF	EGY	Mohamed Mahmoud
37	FW	EGY	Salah Mohsen
-	FW	EGY	Amr Gamal
-	MF	EGY	Moamen Zakaria

=== Out on loan ===
Note: Flags indicate national team as defined under FIFA eligibility rules; some limited exceptions apply. Players may hold more than one non-FIFA nationality.

No.	Pos.	Nation	Player
—	DF	EGY	Mahmoud El Gazzar (at El Gouna until 30 June 2019)
—	DF	EGY	Hussein El Sayed (at Al Ettifaq until 30 June 2019)
—	MF	EGY	Amr Barakat (at Smouha until 30 June 2019)
—	MF	EGY	Ahmed Hamdy (at El Gouna until 30 June 2019)

No.	Pos.	Nation	Player
—	MF	EGY	Akram Tawfik (at El Gouna until 30 June 2019)
—	FW	EGY	Amar Hamdy (at Al Ittihad until 30 June 2019)
—	FW	EGY	Fawzy El Henawy (at Al Ittihad until 30 June 2019)
—	FW	EGY	Ahmed Yasser Rayyan (at El Gouna until 30 June 2019)

== Transfers ==
=== Transfers in ===
#	Position	Player	Transferred from	Fee	Date	Source
15	DF	(Egypt) Ahmed Alaa	(Egypt) El Dakhleya	Undisclosed	10 May 2018	
8	MF	(Egypt) Moamen Zakaria	(Saudi Arabia) Al Ahli	End of loan	30 June 2018	
10	FW	(Egypt) Emad Moteab	(Saudi Arabia) Al Taawoun	End of loan	30 June 2018	
22	MF	(Egypt) Ahmed El Sheikh	(Saudi Arabia) Al Ettifaq	End of loan	30 June 2018	
10	MF	(Egypt) Saleh Gomaa	(Saudi Arabia) Al Faisaly	End of loan	30 June 2018	
19	FW	(Egypt) Abdallah El Said	(Finland) KuPS	End of loan	30 June 2018	
3	DF	(Mali) Salif Coulibaly	(Democratic Republic of the Congo) TP Mazembe	Free transfer	9 July 2018	
	FW	(Egypt) Amar Hamdy	(Egypt) Al Nasr	E£3.5m	16 July 2018	
	FW	(Egypt) Amr Gamal	(Finland) HJK Helsinki	End of loan	1 August 2018	
36	MF	(Egypt) Mohamed Mahmoud	(Egypt) Wadi Degla	E£20m	2 December 2018	
2	DF	(Egypt) Mahmoud Wahid	(Egypt) Misr Lel Makkasa	E£15m	7 December 2018	
29	FW	(Angola) Geraldo	(Angola) 1º de Agosto	16 December 2018		
14	MF	(Egypt) Hussein El Shahat	(United Arab Emirates) Al Ain	E£108m	6 January 2019	
6	DF	(Egypt) Yasser Ibrahim	(Egypt) Smouha	E£30m	7 January 2019	
3	MF	(Egypt) Hamdy Fathy	(Egypt) ENPPI	E£25m	13 January 2019	

==== Loans in ====
#	Position	Player	Loaned from	Date	Loan expires	Source
32	FW	(Egypt) Ramadan Sobhi	(England) Huddersfield Town	28 December 2018	30 June 2019	

=== Transfers out ===
Position	Player	Transferred to	Fee	Date	Source
MF	(Egypt) Hossam Ghaly	Retired		30 June 2018	
FW	(Egypt) Emad Moteab	Retired		30 June 2018	
FW	(Egypt) Abdallah El Said	(Saudi Arabia) Al Ahli	E£40m	30 June 2018	
FW	(South Africa) Phakamani Mahlambi	(South Africa) Mamelodi Sundowns	E£16m	31 August 2018	
DF	(Egypt) Sabry Raheel	(Egypt) Al Ittihad	E£3m	7 January 2019	
DF	(Mali) Salif Coulibaly	(Iraq) Al Shorta	Undisclosed	14 January 2019	
MF	(Egypt) Mido Gaber	(Egypt) Misr Lel Makkasa	E£4m	27 January 2019	

==== Loans out ====
Position	Player	Loaned to	Date	Loan expires	Source
FW	(Egypt) Fawzy El Henawy	(Egypt) Al Ittihad	6 May 2018	30 June 2019	
GK	(Egypt) Omar Radwan	(Egypt) El Gouna	9 July 2018	30 June 2019	
DF	(Egypt) Amr Saadawy	(Egypt) El Gouna	9 July 2018	30 June 2019	
MF	(Egypt) Ahmed Hamdy	(Egypt) El Gouna	2 January 2019	30 June 2019	
FW	(Egypt) Ahmed Yasser Rayyan	(Egypt) El Gouna	2 January 2019	30 June 2019	
FW	(Egypt) Amar Hamdy	(Egypt) Al Ittihad	5 January 2019	30 June 2019	
MF	(Egypt) Amr Barakat	(Egypt) Smouha	7 January 2019	30 June 2019	
DF	(Egypt) Mahmoud El Gazzar	(Egypt) El Gouna	14 January 2019	30 June 2019	
MF	(Egypt) Moamen Zakaria	(Saudi Arabia) Ohod	23 January 2019	25 February 2019	
MF	(Egypt) Akram Tawfik	(Egypt) El Gouna	28 January 2019	30 June 2019	
DF	(Egypt) Islam Gaber	(Egypt) El Gouna	28 January 2019	30 June 2019	

== Friendly matches ==
Win Draw Loss

26 June 2018	Pharco (Egypt)	1–3	(Egypt) Al Ahly	Alexandria, Egypt
15:00 CAT (UTC+2)	El Doky 81'	Report	S. Mohsen 8'; Mohareb 32'; Soliman 83'	Stadium: Tolip Stadium

30 June 2018	El Shams (Egypt)	1–1	(Egypt) Al Ahly	Cairo, Egypt
15:00 CAT (UTC+2)	Youssef 90+1'	Report	Hamoudi 75'	Stadium: Dream Stadium

6 July 2018	Olimpija Ljubljana (Slovenia)	1–1	(Egypt) Al Ahly	Ljubljana, Slovenia
16:00 CEST (UTC+2)	Brkić 50' (pen.)	Report	Soliman 71'	Stadium: ŽŠD Ljubljana Stadium

9 July 2018	Krasnodar (Russia)	1–5	(Egypt) Al Ahly	Gornja Radgona, Slovenia
16:00 CEST (UTC+2)	Ignatyev 10'	Report	Soliman 22' (pen.), 47'; Gaber 77', 80'; Mohareb 90'	Stadium: Gornja Radgona Stadium

12 July 2018	Al Ahly (Egypt)	2–0	(Egypt) Nogoom El Mostakbal	Cairo, Egypt
15:30 CAT (UTC+2)	Azaro 62'; Hesham 82' (pen.)	Report		Stadium: Mokhtar El Tetsh Stadium

19 July 2018	Al Ahly (Egypt)	0–0	(Egypt) El Gouna	Cairo, Egypt
15:30 CAT (UTC+2)		Report		Stadium: Mokhtar El Tetsh Stadium

16 October 2018	Al Ahly (Egypt)	6–0	Telecom Egypt	Cairo, Egypt
15:45 CAT (UTC+2)	Soliman 7'; Hamoudi 9'; El Solia 27'; El Sheikh 71'; Nosaier 83'; Gaber 90+2'	Report		Stadium: Mokhtar El Tetsh Stadium

10 December 2018	Al Ahly (Egypt)	7–0	(Egypt) Nogoom El Sadat	Cairo, Egypt
13:00 CAT (UTC+2)	Hamoudi 18', 35'; Rayyan 30', 45+1'; Barakat 66'; Gamal 75'; Fakhri 85'	Report		Stadium: Mokhtar El Tetsh Stadium

5 January 2019	Al Ahly (Egypt)	3–0	(Egypt) Gomhoriat Shebin	Cairo, Egypt
15:30 CAT (UTC+2)	Ajayi 45+2'; Gaber 54'; Gomaa 88'	Report		Stadium: Mokhtar El Tetsh Stadium

22 March 2019	Al Ahly (Egypt)	2–0	(Egypt) Gomhoriat Shebin	Cairo, Egypt
15:00 CAT (UTC+2)	Gomaa 33' (pen.); Sherif 78'	Report		Stadium: Mokhtar El Tetsh Stadium

=== Saudi-Egyptian Super Cup ===
27 November 2018	Al Ahly (Egypt)	Cancelled	(Saudi Arabia) Al Ittihad	Cairo, Egypt
20:00 CAT (UTC+2)				Stadium: Al Salam Stadium
Note: The 2018 Saudi-Egyptian Super Cup match between Al Ahly and Al Ittihad was cancelled on 15 November 2018 due to scheduling conflicts with both sides' matches until the end of the season.

== Competitions ==
Win Draw Loss

=== Overview ===
Competition	First match	Last match	Starting round	Final position	Record							
Competition	First match	Last match	Starting round	Final position	Pld	W	D	L	GF	GA	GD	Win %
Egyptian Premier League	2 August 2018	28 July 2019	Matchday 1	Winners	34	25	5	4	56	20	+36	73.53
Egypt Cup	10 October 2018	17 August 2019	Round of 32	Round of 16	2	1	0	1	3	3	+0	50.00
Egyptian Super Cup	20 September 2019		Final	Winners	1	1	0	0	3	2	+1	100.00
2018 CAF Champions League	6 March 2018	9 November 2018	First round	Runners-up	14	9	2	3	26	12	+14	64.29
2018–19 CAF Champions League	14 December 2018	13 April 2019	First round	Quarter-finals	10	5	1	4	14	9	+5	50.00
Arab Club Champions Cup	13 August 2018	22 November 2018	First round	Second round	4	1	3	0	7	4	+3	25.00
Total					65	42	11	12	109	50	+59	64.62

Source: Competitions

=== Egyptian Premier League ===
==== League table ====
Pos	Team	Pld	W	D	L	GF	GA	GD	Pts	Qualification or relegation
1	Al Ahly (C)	34	25	5	4	56	20	+36	80	Qualification for the Champions League
2	Zamalek	34	21	9	4	65	31	+34	72	Qualification for the Champions League
3	Pyramids	34	19	13	2	61	31	+30	70	Qualification for the Confederation Cup (Note: Since the 2018–19 Egypt Cup wouldn't finish by the CAF deadline, the spot awarded to the Egypt Cup winners (Confederation Cup preliminary or first round) was passed to the fourth-placed team, Al Masry.)
4	Al Masry	34	12	16	6	45	38	+7	52	Qualification for the Confederation Cup
5	Al Mokawloon Al Arab	34	13	9	12	45	38	+7	48	

Source: Soccerway
Rules for classification: 1) Points; 2) Head-to-Head points; 3) Head-to-Head goal difference; 4) Head-to-Head goals scored; 5) Head-to-Head away goals scored; 6) Goal difference; 7) Goals scored (Note: Head-to-head record is used only after all the matches between the teams in question have been played).
(C) Champions

==== Results summary ====
Overall								Home						Away					
Pld	W	D	L	GF	GA	GD	Pts	W	D	L	GF	GA	GD	W	D	L	GF	GA	GD
34	25	5	4	56	20	+36	80	12	2	3	27	10	+17	13	3	1	29	10	+19

Source: Soccerway

==== Results by round ====
Round	1	2	3	4	5	6	7	8	9	10	11	12	13	14	15	16	17	18	19	20	21	22	23	24	25	26	27	28	29	30	31	32	33	34
Ground	H	A	H	A	H	A	H	A	A	H	A	H	A	H	A	H	A	A	H	A	H	A	H	A	H	H	A	H	A	H	A	H	A	H
Result	D	W	W	W	D	D	W	L	W	L	W	W	W	W	W	L	D	D	W	W	W	W	W	W	L	W	W	W	W	W	W	W	W	W
Position	8	3	2	1	1	4	4	7	7	9	12	12	14	17	18	5	6	7	4	3	3	3	3	3	3	2	2	1	3	2	1	1	1	1

Source: Soccerway
A = Away; H = Home; W = Win; D = Draw; L = Loss

==== Matches ====
2 August 2018 1	Al Ahly	1–1	Ismaily	Cairo
21:00 CAT (UTC+2)	Sherif 90+4'	Report	Jaziri 54'	Stadium: Al Salam Stadium; Referee: Gehad Grisha

7 August 2018 2	Al Masry	0–2	Al Ahly	Alexandria (Note: Al Masry v Al Ahly match was played at Borg El Arab Stadium in Alexandria instead of Al Masry Club Stadium in Port Said due to security concerns.)
20:30 CAT (UTC+2)		Report	Coulibaly 11'; Azaro 73'	Stadium: Borg El Arab Stadium; Referee: Mahmoud El Banna

21 August 2018 3	Al Ahly	1–0	Wadi Degla	Cairo
20:00 CAT (UTC+2)	S. Mohsen 80'	Report		Stadium: Al Salam Stadium; Referee: Mohamed El Hanafy

24 August 2018 4	Haras El Hodoud	0–2	Al Ahly	Alexandria
21:00 CAT (UTC+2)		Report	S. Mohsen 63'; Maâloul 68' (pen.)	Stadium: Haras El Hodoud Stadium; Referee: Tarek Magdy

2 September 2018 5	Al Ahly	0–0	El Entag El Harby	Cairo
21:00 CAT (UTC+2)		Report		Stadium: Al Salam Stadium; Referee: Ibrahim Nour El Din

7 October 2018 10	Al Ahly	3–4	Al Ittihad	Cairo
21:00 CAT (UTC+2)	M. Mohsen 30'; Soliman 61'; Sherif 90+1'	Report	Ashraf 19' (o.g.); Kamar 40'; Koré 54' (pen.); El Alfi 88'	Stadium: Al Salam Stadium; Referee: Mohamed Maarouf

27 November 2018 16	Al Ahly	0–1	Al Mokawloon Al Arab	Cairo
19:00 CAT (UTC+2)		Report	Ali 82'	Stadium: Al Salam Stadium; Referee: Gehad Grisha

1 December 2018 (Note: Petrojet v Al Ahly match, originally scheduled to be played on 2 October 2018, was postponed due to conflicting with Al Ahly v ES Sétif match in the CAF Champions League, which was set to be played on the same day. The match was later rescheduled to be played on 1 December 2018.) 9	Petrojet	0–1	Al Ahly	Suez
18:15 CAT (UTC+2)		Report	El Sheikh 8'	Stadium: Egyptian Army Stadium; Referee: Mahmoud El Banna

5 December 2018 (Note: Al Ahly v El Gouna match, originally scheduled to be played on 17 September 2018, was postponed due to conflicting with Horoya v Al Ahly match in the CAF Champions League, which was set to be played on 14 September 2018. The match was later rescheduled to be played on 5 December 2018.) 7	Al Ahly	2–1	El Gouna	Cairo
20:00 CAT (UTC+2)	El Sheikh 68'; Ali 79' (o.g.)	Report	Nadi 13'	Stadium: Al Salam Stadium; Referee: Mohamed Adel

9 December 2018 (Note: Al Ahly v Tala'ea El Gaish match, originally scheduled to be played on 11 November 2018, was postponed due to conflicting with Espérance de Tunis v Al Ahly match in the CAF Champions League, which was set to be played on 9 November 2018. The match was later rescheduled to be played on 9 December 2018.) 14	Al Ahly	2–0	Tala'ea El Gaish	Cairo
19:00 CAT (UTC+2)	M. Mohsen 29', 31'	Report		Stadium: Al Salam Stadium; Referee: Mohamed El Hanafy

17 December 2018 (Note: Al Ahly v Nogoom match, originally scheduled to be played on 1 November 2018, was postponed due to conflicting with Al Ahly v Espérance de Tunis match in the CAF Champions League, which was set to be played on 2 November 2018. The match was later rescheduled to be played on 17 December 2018.) 12	Al Ahly	2–0	Nogoom	Cairo
19:00 CAT (UTC+2)	M. Mohsen 31'; Zakaria 90+3'	Report		Stadium: Al Salam Stadium; Referee: Mahmoud Ashour

29 December 2018 (Note: El Dakhleya v Al Ahly match, originally scheduled to be played on 11 September 2018, was postponed due to conflicting with Horoya v Al Ahly match in the CAF Champions League, which was set to be played on 14 September 2018. The match was later rescheduled to be played on 29 December 2018.) 6	El Dakhleya	2–2	Al Ahly	Cairo
18:00 CAT (UTC+2)	Salama 56'; Ragab 81'	Report	El Sheikh 49'; Ashraf 90+5'	Stadium: Petro Sport Stadium (Note: El Dakhleya v Al Ahly match was played at Petro Sport Stadium instead of Police Academy Stadium due t security concerns.); Referee: Amin Omar

4 January 2019 (Note: Pyramids v Al Ahly match, originally scheduled to be played on 22 September 2018, was postponed due to conflicting with Al Ahly v Horoya match in the CAF Champions League, which was set to be played on the same day. The match was later rescheduled to be played on 4 January 2019.) 8	Pyramids	2–1	Al Ahly	Cairo
18:00 CAT (UTC+2)	Farouk 47'; El Said 57'	Report	Azaro 33'	Stadium: 30 June Stadium; Referee: Danilo Grujić (Serbia)

8 January 2019 (Note: Smouha v Al Ahly match, originally scheduled to be played on 22 November 2018, was postponed due to conflicting with Al Wasl v Al Ahly match in the Arab Club Champions Cup, which was set to be played on the same day. The match was later rescheduled to be played on 8 January 2019.) 15	Smouha	0–1	Al Ahly	Alexandria
17:00 CAT (UTC+2)		Report	Maâloul 20' (pen.)	Stadium: Borg El Arab Stadium; Referee: Mohamed Adel

24 January 2019 (Note: Misr Lel Makkasa v Al Ahly match, originally scheduled to be played on 20 October 2018, was postponed due to conflicting with ES Sétif v Al Ahly match in the CAF Champions League, which was set to be played on 23 October 2018. The match was later rescheduled to be played on 24 January 2019.) 11	Misr Lel Makkasa	0–3	Al Ahly	Alexandria (Note: Misr Lel Makkasa v Al Ahly match was played at Borg El Arab Stadium in Alexandria instead of Faiyum Stadium in Faiyum due to pitch status.)
17:00 CAT (UTC+2)		Report	El Shahat 4'; Ajayi 30'; Ramadan 76'	Stadium: Borg El Arab Stadium; Referee: Mahmoud Ashour

28 January 2019 20	Wadi Degla	1–2	Al Ahly	Cairo
20:00 CAT (UTC+2)	Helal 86' (pen.)	Report	El Solia 17'; Maâloul 65'	Stadium: Petro Sport Stadium; Referee: Ahmed El Ghandour

5 February 2019 (Note: ENPPI v Al Ahly match, originally scheduled to be played on 7 November 2018, was postponed due to conflicting with Espérance de Tunis v Al Ahly match in the CAF Champions League, which was set to be played on 9 November 2018. The match was later rescheduled to be played on 5 February 2019.) 13	ENPPI	1–2	Al Ahly	Cairo
18:00 CAT (UTC+2)	Kaoud 80'	Report	Ashraf 38'; Ajayi 54'	Stadium: Petro Sport Stadium; Referee: Mohamed El Sabahy

8 February 2019 21	Al Ahly	1–0	Haras El Hodoud	Cairo
18:00 CAT (UTC+2)	H. Fathy 45+4'	Report		Stadium: Al Salam Stadium; Referee: Mohamed Maarouf

16 February 2019 22	El Entag El Harby	0–1	Al Ahly	Cairo
19:00 CAT (UTC+2)		Report	El Solia 49'	Stadium: Petro Sport Stadium (Note: El Entag El Harby v Al Ahly match was played at Petro Sport Stadium instead of Al Salam Stadium due to maintenance.); Referee: Mohamed El Hanafy

20 February 2019 23	Al Ahly	3–1	El Dakhleya	Cairo
20:00 CAT (UTC+2)	Hany 20'; Ajayi 38'; Geraldo 90'	Report	Ouka 73' (pen.)	Stadium: Petro Sport Stadium; Referee: Mahmoud El Banna

24 February 2019 24	El Gouna	1–2	Al Ahly	El Gouna
16:00 CAT (UTC+2)	Gedo 53'	Report	Nedvěd 79'; Maher 87'	Stadium: El Gouna Stadium; Referee: Gehad Grisha

4 March 2019 (Note: Al Ahly v Petrojet match, originally scheduled to be played on 11 March 2019, was played on 4 March 2019 to avoid scheduling conflicts.) 26	Al Ahly	4–0	Petrojet	Cairo
19:00 CAT (UTC+2)	Ajayi 9'; M. Mohsen 31'; Geraldo 69'; Nedvěd 75'	Report		Stadium: Petro Sport Stadium; Referee: Amin Omar

30 March 2019 (Note: Zamalek v Al Ahly match, originally scheduled to be played on 13 December 2018, was postponed due to conflicting with Zamalek v AS CotonTchad match in the CAF Confederation Cup and with Al Ahly v Jimma Aba Jifar match in the CAF Champions League, which were set to be played on 15 and 14 December 2018 respectively. The match was later rescheduled to be played on 30 March 2019.) 17	Zamalek	0–0	Al Ahly	Alexandria
19:00 CAT (UTC+2)		Report		Stadium: Borg El Arab Stadium; Referee: István Kovács (Romania)

2 April 2019 27	Al Ittihad	0–2	Al Ahly	Alexandria
19:30 CAT (UTC+2)		Report	Maâloul 90+2'; Gomaa 90+8'	Stadium: Borg El Arab Stadium; Referee: Gehad Grisha

10 April 2019 28	Al Ahly	2–1	Misr Lel Makkasa	Cairo
20:00 CAT (UTC+2)	H. Fathy 25'; Azaro 82'	Report	Antwi 90+4'	Stadium: Petro Sport Stadium; Referee: Mohamed Maarouf

18 April 2019 (Note: Al Ahly v Pyramids match, originally scheduled to be played on 28 February 2019, was postponed due to conflicting with both sides' match in the Egypt Cup, which was set to be played on the same day. The match was later rescheduled to be played on 18 April 2019. Despite both sides' match in the Egypt Cup was however later postponed too, the Egyptian Football Association refused to change the date for this match again.) 25	Al Ahly	0–1	Pyramids	Cairo
20:00 CAT (UTC+2)		Report	Keno 14'	Stadium: Petro Sport Stadium; Referee: Ivan Bebek (Croatia)

25 April 2019 (Note: Al Ahly v Al Masry match, originally scheduled to be played on 13 January 2019, was postponed due to conflicting with Al Ahly v AS Vita Club match in the CAF Champions League, which was set to be played on 12 January 2019. The match was later rescheduled to be played on 25 April 2019.) 19	Al Ahly	2–0	Al Masry	Alexandria (Note: Al Ahly v Al Masry match was played at Haras El Hodoud Stadium in Alexandria instead of Petro Sport Stadium in Cairo due to security concerns.)
20:00 CAT (UTC+2)	Gomaa 31'; Maâloul 73' (pen.)	Report		Stadium: Haras El Hodoud Stadium; Referee: Roberto García Orozco (Mexico)

1 May 2019 31	Tala'ea El Gaish	1–2	Al Ahly	Alexandria (Note: Tala'ea El Gaish v Al Ahly match was played at Haras El Hodoud Stadium in Alexandria instead of Gehaz El Reyada Stadium in Cairo due to security concerns.)
18:45 CAT (UTC+2)	Gamal I 55' (pen.)	Report	Azaro 45+1'; Maâloul 89'	Stadium: Haras El Hodoud Stadium; Referee: Mahmoud Ashour

5 May 2019 (Note: Nogoom v Al Ahly match, originally scheduled to be played on 13 April 2019, was postponed due to conflicting with Al Ahly v Mamelodi Sundowns match in the CAF Champions League, which was set to be played on the same day. The match was later rescheduled to be player on 5 May 2019) 29	Nogoom	0–2	Al Ahly	Cairo
19:00 CAT (UTC+2)		Report	Azaro 7'; Ramadan 85'	Stadium: Petro Sport Stadium; Referee: Mohamed El Hanafy

11 May 2019 32	Al Ahly	1–0	Smouha	Cairo
22:00 CAT (UTC+2)	Geraldo 90+8'	Report		Stadium: Petro Sport Stadium; Referee: Amin Omar

16 May 2019 (Note: Al Ahly v ENPPI match, originally scheduled to be played on 25 April 2019, was postponed due to security concerns. The match was later rescheduled to be played on 16 May 2019.) 30	Al Ahly	2–0	ENPPI	Cairo
22:00 CAT (UTC+2)	El Shahat 4'; M. Mohsen 90+4'	Report		Stadium: Petro Sport Stadium; Referee: Mohamed Adel

22 May 2019 (Note: Ismaily v Al Ahly match, originally scheduled to be played on 23 December 2018, was postponed due to conflicting with Coton Sport v Ismaily match in the CAF Champions League and with Jimma Aba Jifar vs Al Ahly match in the CAF Champions League, which were set to be played on 22 and 23 December 2018 respectively. The match was later rescheduled to be played on 22 May 2019.) 18	Ismaily	1–1	Al Ahly	Alexandria (Note: Ismaily v Al Ahly match was played at Borg El Arab Stadium in Alexandria instead of Ismailia Stadium in Ismailia due to maintenance.)
22:00 CAT (UTC+2)	Bambo 84'	Report	Azaro 73'	Stadium: Borg El Arab Stadium; Referee: Mohamed Maarouf

24 July 2019 (Note: Al Mokawloon Al Arab v Al Ahly match, originally scheduled to be played on 23 May 2019, was postponed due to security concerns. The match was later rescheduled to be played on 24 July 2019.) 33	Al Mokawloon Al Arab	1–3	Al Ahly	Alexandria (Note: Al Mokawloon Al Arab v Al Ahly match was played at Borg El Arab Stadium in Alexandria instead of Osman Ahmed Osman Stadium in Cairo due to security concerns.)
20:00 CAT (UTC+2)	Jaziri 90+1'	Report	Maâloul 26'; El Shahat 63', 71'	Stadium: Borg El Arab Stadium; Referee: Mohamed Adel

28 July 2019 (Note: Al Ahly v Zamalek match, originally scheduled to be played on 27 May 2019, was postponed due to conflicting with Zamalek v RS Berkane match in the CAF Confederation Cup, which was set to be played on 26 May 2019. The match was later rescheduled to be played on 28 July 2019.) 34	Al Ahly	1–0	Zamalek	Alexandria
20:00 CAT (UTC+2)	Maâloul 59'	Report		Stadium: Borg El Arab Stadium; Referee: Ferenc Karako (Hungary)

=== Egypt Cup ===
10 October 2018 Round of 32	Al Ahly	3–2	Tersana	Cairo
17:00 CAT (UTC+2)	Sherif 37', 71'; El Sheikh 89'	Report	Ragab 4'; Tarek 64'	Stadium: Al Salam Stadium; Referee: Mahmoud Ashour

17 August 2019 (Note: Al Ahly v Pyramids match, originally scheduled to be played on 25 October 2018, was postponed due to conflicting with Al Ahly v ES Sétif match in the CAF Champions League, which was set to be played on 23 October 2018. The match was later rescheduled to be played on 28 February 2019. However the match was postponed again on 26 February 2019 due to security concerns. The match was later once again rescheduled to be played on 17 August 2019.) Round of 16	Al Ahly	0–1	Pyramids	Alexandria (Note: Starting from round of 16, all matches were played on stadiums selected by the Egyptian Football Association.)
20:00 CAT (UTC+2)		Report	Traoré 55'	Stadium: Borg El Arab Stadium; Referee: Gehad Grisha

=== Egyptian Super Cup ===
20 September 2019	Al Ahly	3–2	Zamalek	Alexandria, Egypt
19:00 CAT (UTC+2)	Ajayi 19', 49'; El Shahat 45+3'	Report	Alaa 64' (pen.), 76' (pen.)	Stadium: Borg El Arab Stadium; Attendance: 15,000; Referee: Felix Brych (Germany)

=== CAF Champions League ===
==== 2018 CAF Champions League ====
===== First round =====
6 March 2018 First leg	Al Ahly (Egypt)	4–0	(Gabon) CF Mounana	Cairo, Egypt
20:00 CAT (UTC+2)	M. Mohsen 13'; Azaro 21'; El Said 65', 69' (pen.)	Report		Stadium: Cairo International Stadium; Referee: Boubou Traoré (Mali)

17 March 2018 Second leg	CF Mounana (Gabon)	1–3 (1–7 agg.)	(Egypt) Al Ahly	Libreville, Gabon
15:30 WAT (UTC+1)	Massamba 44'	Report	Gaber 8'; Azaro 30'; Soliman 82'	Stadium: Stade d'Angondjé; Referee: Bamlak Tessema Weyesa (Ethiopia)

===== Group A =====
Pos	Team	Pld	W	D	L	GF	GA	GD	Pts	Qualification
1	(Egypt) Al Ahly	6	4	1	1	9	5	+4	13	Quarter-finals
2	(Tunisia) Espérance de Tunis	6	3	2	1	8	4	+4	11	Quarter-finals
3	(Uganda) KCCA	6	2	0	4	8	9	−1	6	
4	(Botswana) Township Rollers	6	1	1	4	2	9	−7	4	

Source: CAF
Rules for classification: Group stage tiebreakers

4 May 2018 1	Al Ahly (Egypt)	0–0	(Tunisia) Espérance de Tunis	Alexandria, Egypt
21:00 CAT (UTC+2)		Report		Stadium: Borg El Arab Stadium; Referee: Malang Diedhiou (Senegal)

15 May 2018 2	KCCA (Uganda)	2–0	(Egypt) Al Ahly	Kira, Uganda
16:00 EAT (UTC+3)	Juma 74'; Awany 89' (pen.)	Report		Stadium: Mandela National Stadium; Referee: Victor Gomes (South Africa)

17 July 2018 3	Al Ahly (Egypt)	3–0	(Botswana) Township Rollers	Alexandria, Egypt
21:00 CAT (UTC+2)	Azaro 36'; Maâloul 75' (pen.); Mohareb 79'	Report		Stadium: Borg El Arab Stadium; Referee: Mustapha Ghorbal (Algeria)

28 July 2018 4	Township Rollers (Botswana)	0–1	(Egypt) Al Ahly	Gaborone, Botswana
18:00 CAT (UTC+2)		Report	Coulibaly 81'	Stadium: Botswana National Stadium; Referee: Davies Omweno (Kenya)

17 August 2018 5	Espérance de Tunis (Tunisia)	0–1	(Egypt) Al Ahly	Radès, Tunisia
20:00 WAT (UTC+1)		Report	Azaro 32'	Stadium: Stade Olympique de Radès; Referee: Eric Otogo-Castane (Gabon)

28 August 2018 6	Al Ahly (Egypt)	4–3	(Uganda) KCCA	Alexandria, Egypt
21:00 CAT (UTC+2)	Azaro 23', 62'; Coulibaly 50'; S. Mohsen 70'	Report	Nunda 40'; Magambo 54'; Okello 82'	Stadium: Borg El Arab Stadium; Referee: Redouane Jiyed (Morocco)

===== Quarter-finals =====
14 September 2018 First leg	Horoya (Guinea)	0–0	(Egypt) Al Ahly	Conakry, Guinea
16:00 GMT (UTC±0)		Report		Stadium: Stade du 28 Septembre; Referee: Youssef Essrayri (Tunisia)

22 September 2018 Second leg	Al Ahly (Egypt)	4–0 (4–0 agg.)	(Guinea) Horoya	Cairo, Egypt
21:00 CAT (UTC+2)	Soliman 32'; Mohareb 53'; S. Mohsen 69'; A. Fathy 90+1'	Report		Stadium: Al Salam Stadium; Referee: Bakary Gassama (Gambia)

===== Semi-finals =====
2 October 2018 First leg	Al Ahly (Egypt)	2–0	(Algeria) ES Sétif	Cairo, Egypt
21:00 CAT (UTC+2)	Soliman 23'; Mohareb 41'	Report		Stadium: Al Salam Stadium; Referee: Bamlak Tessema Weyesa (Ethiopia)

23 October 2018 Second leg	ES Sétif (Algeria)	2–1 (2–3 agg.)	(Egypt) Al Ahly	Sétif, Algeria
20:00 WAT (UTC+1)	Bakir 67'; Ghacha 72'	Report	Soliman 61'	Stadium: Stade 8 Mai 1945; Referee: Victor Gomes (South Africa)

===== Final =====
2 November 2018 First leg	Al Ahly (Egypt)	3–1	(Tunisia) Espérance de Tunis	Alexandria, Egypt
21:00 CAT (UTC+2)	Soliman 34' (pen.), 77' (pen.); El Solia 58'	Report	Belaïli 64' (pen.)	Stadium: Borg El Arab Stadium; Referee: Mehdi Abid Charef (Algeria)

9 November 2018 Second leg	Espérance de Tunis (Tunisia)	3–0 (4–3 agg.)	(Egypt) Al Ahly	Radès, Tunisia
20:00 WAT (UTC+1)	Bguir 45+1', 54'; Badri 86'	Report		Stadium: Stade Olympique de Radès; Referee: Bamlak Tessema Weyesa (Ethiopia)

==== 2018–19 CAF Champions League ====
===== First round =====
14 December 2018 First leg	Al Ahly (Egypt)	2–0	(Ethiopia) Jimma Aba Jifar	Alexandria, Egypt
18:00 CAT (UTC+2)	Maher 8'; M. Mohsen 38'	Report		Stadium: Borg El Arab Stadium; Attendance: 10,000; Referee: Sadok Selmi (Tunisia)

23 December 2018 Second leg	Jimma Aba Jifar (Ethiopia)	1–0 (1–2 agg.)	(Egypt) Al Ahly	Addis Ababa, Ethiopia
16:00 EAT (UTC+3)	Lebri 45+3'	Report		Stadium: Addis Ababa Stadium; Referee: Hassan Mohamed Hagi (Somalia)

===== Group D =====
Pos	Team	Pld	W	D	L	GF	GA	GD	Pts	Qualification
1	(Egypt) Al-Ahly	6	3	1	2	11	3	+8	10	Quarter-finals
2	(Tanzania) Simba	6	3	0	3	6	13	−7	9	Quarter-finals
3	(Algeria) JS Saoura	6	2	2	2	6	9	−3	8	
4	(Democratic Republic of the Congo) AS Vita Club	6	2	1	3	9	7	+2	7	

Source: CAF
Rules for classification: Group stage tiebreakers

12 January 2019 1	Al Ahly (Egypt)	2–0	(Democratic Republic of the Congo) AS Vita Club	Alexandria, Egypt
21:00 CAT (UTC+2)	Maher 65'; Maâloul 79' (pen.)	Report		Stadium: Borg El Arab Stadium; Attendance: 15,000; Referee: Sadok Selmi (Tunisia)

18 January 2019 2	JS Saoura (Algeria)	1–1	(Egypt) Al Ahly	Béchar, Algeria
20:00 WAT (UTC+1)	Yahia-Chérif 59'	Report	Nedvěd 85'	Stadium: Stade 20 Août 1955; Attendance: 20,000; Referee: Eric Otogo-Castane (Gabon)

2 February 2019 3	Al Ahly (Egypt)	5–0	(Tanzania) Simba	Alexandria, Egypt
21:00 CAT (UTC+2)	El Solia 3'; Maâloul 23'; Ajayi 31'; Nedvěd 33', 40'	Report		Stadium: Borg El Arab Stadium; Attendance: 12,000; Referee: Maguette N'Diaye (Senegal)

12 February 2019 4	Simba (Tanzania)	1–0	(Egypt) Al Ahly	Dar es Salaam, Tanzania
16:00 EAT (UTC+3)	Kagere 65'	Report		Stadium: National Stadium; Referee: Mahmoud Ismail (Sudan)

9 March 2019 5	AS Vita Club (Democratic Republic of the Congo)	1–0	(Egypt) Al Ahly	Kinshasa, DR Congo
17:00 WAT (UTC+1)	Kisinda 84'	Report		Stadium: Stade des Martyrs; Referee: Victor Gomes (South Africa)

16 March 2019 6	Al Ahly (Egypt)	3–0	(Algeria) JS Saoura	Alexandria, Egypt
18:00 CAT (UTC+2)	Talah 30' (o.g.); M. Mohsen 45+2'; El Shahat 81'	Report		Stadium: Borg El Arab Stadium; Attendance: 20,000; Referee: Sadok Selmi (Tunisia)

===== Quarter-finals =====
6 April 2019 First leg	Mamelodi Sundowns (South Africa)	5–0	(Egypt) Al Ahly	Pretoria, South Africa
15:00 CAT (UTC+2)	Zwane 14'; Arendse 24'; Nascimento 47' (pen.); Sirino 62'; Mahlambi 83'	Report		Stadium: Lucas Masterpieces Moripe Stadium; Referee: Maguette N'Diaye (Senegal)

13 April 2019 Second leg	Al Ahly (Egypt)	1–0 (1–5 agg.)	(South Africa) Mamelodi Sundowns	Alexandria, Egypt
18:00 CAT (UTC+2)	Azaro 68'	Report		Stadium: Borg El Arab Stadium; Referee: Bakary Gassama (Gambia)

=== Arab Club Champions Cup ===
==== First round ====
13 August 2018 First leg	Al Ahly (Egypt)	0–0	(Lebanon) Al Nejmeh	Alexandria, Egypt
20:00 CAT (UTC+2)		Report		Stadium: Borg El Arab Stadium; Referee: Noureddine El Jaafari (Morocco)

27 September 2018 Second leg	Al Nejmeh (Lebanon)	1–4 (1–4 agg.)	(Egypt) Al Ahly	Beirut, Lebanon
19:30 EEST (UTC+3)	Al Mohamed 89'	Report	Maâloul 25'; Zakaria 36'; Soliman 63'; Sherif 76'	Stadium: Camille Chamoun Sports City Stadium; Referee: Turki Al Khudair (Saudi Arabia)

==== Second round ====
28 October 2018 First leg	Al Ahly (Egypt)	2–2	(United Arab Emirates) Al Wasl	Alexandria, Egypt
20:00 CAT (UTC+2)	A. Fathy 45'; M. Mohsen 90+4'	Report	Caio 82'; F. Lima 86'	Stadium: Borg El Arab Stadium; Referee: Adham Makhadmeh (Jordan)

22 November 2018 Second leg	Al Wasl (United Arab Emirates)	1–1 (3–3 (a) agg.)	(Egypt) Al Ahly	Dubai, United Arab Emirates
19:30 GST (UTC+4)	Oh Ban-suk 82'	Report	Soliman 58'	Stadium: Zabeel Stadium; Referee: Noureddine El Jaafari (Morocco)

== Statistics ==
=== Appearances and goals ===
No.	Pos	Player	Egyptian Premier League		Egypt Cup		Egyptian Super Cup		2018 CAF Champions League		2018–19 CAF Champions League		Arab Club Champions Cup		Total	
No.	Pos	Player	Apps	Goals	Apps	Goals	Apps	Goals	Apps	Goals	Apps	Goals	Apps	Goals	Apps	Goals
1	GK	(Egypt) Sherif Ekramy	8	0	0	0	0	0	0	0	2	0	1+1	0	12	0
2	DF	(Egypt) Mahmoud Wahid	1	0	0	0	0	0	0	0	0+1	0	0	0	2	0
3	MF	(Egypt) Hamdy Fathy	11+2	2	1	0	1	0	0	0	1	0	0	0	16	2
4	MF	(Egypt) Hesham Mohamed	14+3	0	1	0	0	0	4+3	0	3+1	0	1+1	0	31	0
5	MF	(Egypt) Islam Mohareb	4+5	0	0+1	0	0	0	7+6	3	2	0	1	0	26	3
6	DF	(Egypt) Yasser Ibrahim	13	0	0	0	1	0	0	0	3+2	0	0	0	19	0
7	MF	(Egypt) Ahmed Hamoudi	3+1	0	0	0	0	0	5+1	0	2+2	0	1+1	0	16	0
9	FW	(Morocco) Walid Azaro	20+3	6	1	0	0	0	11	6	1+4	1	0+2	0	42	13
10	MF	(Egypt) Saleh Gomaa	7+6	2	1	0	0	0	0	0	0	0	0	0	14	2
11	MF	(Egypt) Walid Soliman	9+6	1	0	0	0	0	12+1	6	2+1	0	3	2	34	9
12	DF	(Egypt) Ayman Ashraf	28+2	2	1	0	0	0	8+4	0	10	0	4	0	57	2
13	GK	(Egypt) Ali Lotfi	3	0	1	0	0	0	0	0	0+1	0	0	0	5	0
14	DF	(Egypt) Hussein El Shahat	15+2	4	1	0	1	1	0	0	5+2	1	0	0	26	6
15	DF	(Egypt) Ahmed Alaa	4+1	0	1	0	0	0	0	0	0	0	1	0	7	0
16	GK	(Egypt) Mohamed El Shenawy	23	0	1	0	1	0	14	0	8	0	3	0	50	0
17	MF	(Egypt) Amr El Solia	26+2	2	1+1	0	1	0	11	1	10	1	1	0	53	4
18	FW	(Egypt) Marwan Mohsen	5+11	6	0	0	0+1	0	4	1	6+1	2	3	1	31	10
19	MF	(Egypt) Mohamed Sherif	2+4	2	1	2	0	0	0+2	0	1+1	0	2+1	1	14	5
20	DF	(Egypt) Saad Samir	12+1	0	0	0	0	0	11	0	4	0	2	0	30	0
21	DF	(Tunisia) Ali Maâloul	25+1	8	1	0	1	0	9	1	8	2	1	1	46	12
22	MF	(Egypt) Ahmed El Sheikh	7+1	3	0+2	1	0	0	0	0	0	0	0+2	0	12	4
23	DF	(Egypt) Mohamed Naguib	2	0	0	0	0	0	2+1	0	0	0	1	0	6	0
24	DF	(Egypt) Ahmed Fathy	12+3	0	0	0	1	0	11	1	2	0	2	1	31	2
25	MF	(Egypt) Hossam Ashour	9+2	0	0	0	0+1	0	13	0	2+1	0	4	0	32	0
26	DF	(Egypt) Basem Ali	2+4	0	0	0	0	0	0	0	0	0	0	0	6	0
27	DF	(Egypt) Ramy Rabia	4+2	0	1	0	0	0	0	0	0+1	0	0	0	8	0
28	FW	(Nigeria) Junior Ajayi	11+4	4	0+1	0	1	2	3	0	6+1	1	0	0	27	7
29	FW	(Angola) Geraldo	9+8	3	0	0	0	0	0	0	0	0	0	0	17	3
30	DF	(Egypt) Mohamed Hany	19+1	1	1	0	0+1	0	4+3	0	9	0	2	0	40	1
32	FW	(Egypt) Ramadan Sobhi	15+3	2	1	0	1	0	0	0	7	0	0	0	27	2
33	MF	(Egypt) Nasser Maher	21+2	1	0	0	0	0	3	0	5+5	2	0	0	36	3
35	MF	(Egypt) Karim Walid	11+6	2	1	0	0	0	0+2	0	8+1	3	1	0	30	5
36	MF	(Egypt) Mohamed Mahmoud	1+1	0	0	0	0	0	0	0	0	0	0	0	2	0
37	FW	(Egypt) Salah Mohsen	2+8	2	0	0	0	0	0+8	2	0+2	0	2+2	0	24	4
Players joined during the 2019 summer transfer window
4	DF	(Egypt) Mahmoud Metwalli	0	0	0	0	1	0	0	0	0	0	0	0	1	0
19	MF	(Egypt) Mohamed Magdy	0	0	0+1	0	1	0	0	0	0	0	0	0	2	0
Players transferred out during the season
3	DF	(Mali) Salif Coulibaly	9	1	0	0	0	0	10	2	3	0	3	0	25	3
6	DF	(Egypt) Sabry Raheel	1	0	1	0	0	0	2	0	0	0	0	0	4	0
7	FW	(South Africa) Phakamani Mahlambi	0	0	0	0	0	0	2	0	0	0	0	0	2	0
8	MF	(Egypt) Moamen Zakaria	1+4	1	1	0	0	0	2+1	0	0	0	2	1	11	2
19	FW	(Egypt) Abdallah El Said	0	0	0	0	0	0	1	2	0	0	0	0	1	2
27	MF	(Egypt) Mido Gaber	3+1	0	0	0	0	0	5+3	1	0+2	0	1+1	0	16	1
34	MF	(Egypt) Ahmed Hamdy	0	0	1	0	0	0	0+1	0	0	0	1+1	0	4	0
38	MF	(Egypt) Akram Tawfik	2+1	0	1	0	0	0	0+4	0	0	0	1	0	9	0
39	FW	(Egypt) Ahmed Yasser Rayyan	0	0	1	0	0	0	0	0	0	0	0	0	1	0
42	DF	(Egypt) Mahmoud El Gazzar	0	0	1	0	0	0	0	0	0	0	0	0	1	0

=== Goalscorers ===
Rank	Position	Name	Egyptian Premier League	Egypt Cup	Egyptian Super Cup	2018 CAF Champions League	2018–19 CAF Champions League	Arab Club Champions Cup	Total
1	FW	(Morocco) Walid Azaro	6	0	0	6	1	0	13
2	DF	(Tunisia) Ali Maâloul	8	0	0	1	2	1	12
3	FW	(Egypt) Marwan Mohsen	6	0	0	1	2	1	10
4	FW	(Egypt) Walid Soliman	1	0	0	6	0	2	9
5	FW	(Nigeria) Junior Ajayi	4	0	2	0	1	0	7
6	FW	(Egypt) Hussein El Shahat	4	0	1	0	1	0	6
7	MF	(Egypt) Mohamed Sherif	2	2	0	0	0	1	5
7	MF	(Egypt) Karim Walid	2	0	0	0	3	0	5
9	FW	(Egypt) Salah Mohsen	2	0	0	2	0	0	4
9	MF	(Egypt) Ahmed El Sheikh	3	1	0	0	0	0	4
9	MF	(Egypt) Amr El Solia	2	0	0	1	1	0	4
12	DF	(Mali) Salif Coulibaly	1	0	0	2	0	0	3
12	FW	(Angola) Geraldo	3	0	0	0	0	0	3
12	MF	(Egypt) Nasser Maher	1	0	0	0	2	0	3
12	MF	(Egypt) Islam Mohareb	0	0	0	3	0	0	3
16	DF	(Egypt) Ayman Ashraf	2	0	0	0	0	0	2
16	DF	(Egypt) Ahmed Fathy	0	0	0	1	0	1	2
16	MF	(Egypt) Hamdy Fathy	2	0	0	0	0	0	2
16	MF	(Egypt) Saleh Gomaa	2	0	0	0	0	0	2
16	FW	(Egypt) Abdallah El Said	0	0	0	2	0	0	2
16	FW	(Egypt) Ramadan Sobhi	2	0	0	0	0	0	2
16	MF	(Egypt) Moamen Zakaria	1	0	0	0	0	1	2
23	MF	(Egypt) Mido Gaber	0	0	0	1	0	0	1
23	DF	(Egypt) Mohamed Hany	1	0	0	0	0	0	1
Own goal			1	0	0	0	1	0	2
Total			56	3	3	26	14	7	109

=== Clean sheets ===
Rank	Name	Egyptian Premier League	Egypt Cup	Egyptian Super Cup	2018 CAF Champions League	2018–19 CAF Champions League	Arab Club Champions Cup	Total
1	(Egypt) Mohamed El Shenawy	13	0	0	8	4	0	25
2	(Egypt) Sherif Ekramy	4	0	0	0	1	1	6
3	(Egypt) Ali Lotfi	2	0	0	0	0	0	2
Total		19	0	0	8	5	1	33
