= Salah Mohsen =

Egyptian footballer (born 1998)

Personal information
- Full name: Salah Mohsen Mohamed Shalaby
- Date of birth: 1 September 1998 (age 28)
- Place of birth: Zagazig, Egypt
- Height: 1.81 m (5 ft 11 in)
- Position: Striker

Team information
- Current team: Al Masry
- Number: 9

Youth career
- Enppi

Senior career*
Years	Team	Apps	(Gls)
2016–2018	Enppi	34	(10)
2018–2024	Al Ahly	59	(10)
2019–2020	→ Smouha (loan)	14	(5)
2022–2023	→ Ceramica Cleopatra (loan)	20	(4)
2024–	Al Masry	51	(15)

International career
2017–	Egypt	5	(1)
- * Club domestic league appearances and goals

Salah Mohsen Mohamed Shalaby (Arabic: صلاح محسن محمد شلبي; born 1 September 1998) is an Egyptian professional footballer who plays as a forward for the Egypt national team and the Egyptian Premier League side Al Masry.

== Club career ==
Mohsen started his career at Enppi, before joining Al Ahly in 2018. In late January 2024, he signed for Al Masry, following the termination of his contract with Al Ahly by mutual consent.

== International career ==
On 2 July 2021, Mohsen was named in the 22-man squad for the 2020 Summer Olympics.

On 2 December 2025, Mohsen was called up to the Egypt squad for the 2025 Africa Cup of Nations.

== Career statistics ==
As of 1 June 2021

=== Club ===
Appearances and goals by club, season and competition
team	season	League		Cup		Continental		Other		Total	
team	season	APP	Goals	APP	Goals	APP	Goals	APP	Goals	APP	Goals
ENPPI	2016–17	16	3	2	0	—		—		18	3
ENPPI	2017–18	18	7	1	0	—		—		19	7
ENPPI	Total	34	10	3	0	0	0	0	0	37	10
Al Ahly	2017–18	7	2	1	0	8	2	0	0	16	4
Al Ahly	2018–19	10	2	0	0	2	0	0	0	12	2
Al Ahly	2019–20	1	0	0	0	2	2	0	0	3	2
Al Ahly	2020–21	23	5	1	0	6	1	3	1	33	7
Al Ahly	2021–22	15	1	1	0	2	0	0	0	18	1
Al Ahly	Total	59	10	3	0	20	5	3	1	92	16
Smouha (loan)	2019–20	14	5	1	1	—		—		15	6
Ceramica Cleopatra (loan)	2022–23	11	2	0	0	—		—		11	2

=== International ===
Scores and results list Egypt's goal tally first.

No.	Date	Venue	Opponent	Score	Result	Competition
1.	8 September 2018	Borg El Arab Stadium, Alexandria, Egypt	Niger	4–0	6–0	2019 Africa Cup of Nations qualification

== Honours ==
Al Ahly

- Egyptian Premier League:2017–18, 2018–19, 2019-20
- Egypt Cup: 2019–20, 2021–22
- Egyptian Super Cup: 2018
- CAF Champions League: 2019-20, 2020-21
- FIFA Club World Cup: Third-Place 2020
- CAF Super Cup: 2021

Egypt U23

- Africa U-23 Cup of Nations Champions: 2019
