= 2019 Africa Cup of Nations qualification Group J =

Group J of the 2019 Africa Cup of Nations qualification tournament was one of the twelve groups to decide the teams which qualified for the 2019 Africa Cup of Nations finals tournament. The group consisted of four teams: Tunisia, Egypt, Niger, and Eswatini (formerly Swaziland).

The teams played against each other in home-and-away round-robin format between June 2017 and March 2019.

Tunisia and Egypt, the group winners and runners-up respectively, qualified for the 2019 Africa Cup of Nations.

== Standings ==
Pos	Team	Pld	W	D	L	GF	GA	GD	Pts	Qualification	Tunisia national football team	Egypt national football team	Niger national football team	Eswatini national football team
1	Tunisia	6	5	0	1	12	4	+8	15	Final tournament	—	1–0	1–0	4–0
2	Egypt (Note: Egypt were named as hosts of the final tournament replacing Cameroon on 8 January 2019. At that time, they had already clinched a top two place in Group J and assured of qualification to the final tournament.)	6	4	1	1	16	5	+11	13	Final tournament	3–2	—	6–0	4–1
3	Niger	6	1	2	3	4	11	−7	5		1–2	1–1	—	0–0
4	Eswatini (Note: The official name of Swaziland was changed to Eswatini in 2018 after they had played their first qualifying match, and since then both FIFA and CAF have used the name Eswatini for official use.)	6	0	1	5	2	14	−12	1		0–2	0–2	1–2	—

Source: CAF
Rules for classification: Qualification tiebreakers

== Matches ==
10 June 2017
16:00 UTC+1

Niger	0–0	Swaziland
	Report

Stade Général Seyni Kountché, Niamey
Referee: Thierry Nkurunziza (Burundi)
11 June 2017
23:00 UTC+1

Tunisia	1–0	Egypt
Khenissi 47'	Report

Stade Olympique de Radès, Tunis
Attendance: 45,000
Referee: Bouchaïb El Ahrach (Morocco)

8 September 2018
20:00 UTC+2

Egypt	6–0	Niger
M. Mohsen 13'; Ashraf 20'; Salah 29', 86'; S. Mohsen 73'; Elneny 90+2'	Report

Borg El Arab Stadium, Alexandria
Attendance: 20,000
Referee: Maguette N'Diaye (Senegal)
9 September 2018
15:00 UTC+2

Eswatini	0–2	Tunisia
	Report	Khenissi 18'; Sliti 37'

Mavuso Sports Centre, Manzini
Referee: Bamlak Tessema Weyesa (Ethiopia)

12 October 2018
19:00 UTC+2

Egypt	4–1	Eswatini
A. El Mohamady 7'; Warda 10'; Trézéguet 29'; Salah 44'	Report	Gamedze 85'

Al Salam Stadium, Cairo
Attendance: 15,000
Referee: Louis Hakizimana (Rwanda)
13 October 2018
19:15 UTC+1

Tunisia	1–0	Niger
Meriah 17'	Report

Stade Olympique de Radès, Tunis
Referee: Eric Otogo-Castane (Gabon)

16 October 2018
15:00 UTC+2

Eswatini	0–2	Egypt
	Report	Hegazi 19'; M. Mohsen 53'

Mavuso Sports Centre, Manzini
Referee: Mahmood Ali Mahmood Ismail (Sudan)
16 October 2018
16:00 UTC+1

Niger	1–2	Tunisia
Oumarou 36'	Report	Chaouat 28', 32'

Stade Général Seyni Kountché, Niamey
Referee: Noureddine El Jaafari (Morocco)

16 November 2018
18:00 UTC+2

Egypt	3–2	Tunisia
Trézéguet 32'; B. El Mohamady 60'; Salah 90'	Report	Sliti 13', 72'

Borg El Arab Stadium, Alexandria
Attendance: 25,000
Referee: Victor Gomes (South Africa)
18 November 2018
15:30 UTC+2

Eswatini	1–2	Niger
Nkambule 19'	Report	Adebayor 55', 77'

Mavuso Sports Centre, Manzini
Referee: Ahmad Imtehaz Heeralall (Mauritius)

22 March 2019
19:15 UTC+1

Tunisia	4–0	Eswatini
Ben Youssef 21'; Badri 34'; Sliti 53'; Meriah 62'	Report

Stade Olympique de Radès, Tunis
Referee: Georges Gatogato (Burundi)
23 March 2019
16:30 UTC+1

Niger	1–1	Egypt
Moutari 82'	Report	Trézéguet 47'

Stade Général Seyni Kountché, Niamey
Referee: Ring Nyier Akech Malong (South Sudan)

== Goalscorers ==
There were 34 goals scored in 12 matches, for an average of 2.83 goals per match.

4 goals

- (Egypt) Mohamed Salah
- (Tunisia) Naïm Sliti

3 goals

- (Egypt) Trézéguet

2 goals

- (Egypt) Marwan Mohsen
- (Niger) Victorien Adebayor
- (Tunisia) Firas Chaouat
- (Tunisia) Taha Yassine Khenissi
- (Tunisia) Yassine Meriah

1 goal

- (Egypt) Ayman Ashraf
- (Egypt) Ahmed El Mohamady
- (Egypt) Baher El Mohamady
- (Egypt) Mohamed Elneny
- (Egypt) Ahmed Hegazi
- (Egypt) Salah Mohsen
- (Egypt) Amr Warda
- (Eswatini) Sibonginkosi Gamedze
- (Eswatini) Sifiso Nkambule
- (Niger) Amadou Moutari
- (Niger) Youssouf Oumarou
- (Tunisia) Anice Badri
- (Tunisia) Syam Ben Youssef
