= 2018 Egyptian Super Cup =

2017–18 Egyptian Super Cup
Al Ahly	Al Masry
1	0
- After extra time
- Date: 12 January 2018
- Venue: Hazza Bin Zayed Stadium, Al Ain
- Referee: Ammar Al Jeneibi (United Arab Emirates)
- Attendance: 18,000
- Weather: Clear; 19 °C (66 °F); 43% humidity

The 2018 Egyptian Super Cup (also known as the 2017–18 SAIB Egyptian Super Cup for sponsorship reasons) was the 15th edition of the Egyptian Super Cup, an annual football match between the winners of the previous season's Egyptian Premier League and Egypt Cup. The match is usually contested by the winners of the Premier League and the Egypt Cup, but since Al Ahly won the double (2016–17 Egyptian Premier League and 2016–17 Egypt Cup), Al Masry qualified by default as the runners-up of the cup. The match was played for the third consecutive time in the United Arab Emirates at the Hazza Bin Zayed Stadium in Al Ain, Abu Dhabi. Al Ahly won the match 1–0 at extra time, after the match finished 0–0 after 90 minutes.

== Details ==
12 January 2018
20:00 GST

Al Ahly	1–0 (a.e.t.)	Al Masry
Azaro 101'	Report

Hazza Bin Zayed Stadium, Al Ain
Attendance: 18,000
Referee: Ammar Al Jeneibi (United Arab Emirates)

Al Ahly	Al Masry

GK	16	(Egypt) Mohamed El Shenawy
LB	21	(Tunisia) Ali Maâloul
CB	12	(Egypt) Ayman Ashraf
CB	20	(Egypt) Saad Samir	(yellow card) 54'
RB	24	(Egypt) Ahmed Fathy	(yellow card) 21'
CM	25	(Egypt) Hossam Ashour (c)	(yellow card) 107'
CM	14	(Egypt) Amr El Solia	(yellow card) 120'
AM	19	(Egypt) Abdallah El Said		(substituted off) 120+2'
LW	28	(Nigeria) Junior Ajayi		(substituted off) 97'
RW	11	(Egypt) Walid Soliman		(substituted off) 83'
CF	9	(Morocco) Walid Azaro	(yellow card) 57'
Substitutes:
GK	1	(Egypt) Sherif Ekramy
DF	30	(Egypt) Mohamed Hany
MF	8	(Egypt) Moamen Zakaria		(substituted on) 83'
MF	35	(Egypt) Karim Nedvěd		(substituted on) 120+2'
FW	5	(Egypt) Islam Mohareb		(substituted on) 97'
FW	17	(Egypt) Ahmed Hamoudi
FW	18	(Egypt) Marwan Mohsen
Manager:
(Egypt) Hossam El Badry

GK	26	(Egypt) Ahmed Masoud
LB	19	(Egypt) Mohamed Hamdy	(yellow card) 15'
CB	4	(Burkina Faso) Mohamed Koffi
CB	24	(Egypt) Ahmed Gouda
RB	32	(Egypt) Karim El Iraqi
CM	5	(Egypt) Farid Shawky		(substituted off) 115'
CM	7	(Egypt) Islam Issa
AM	10	(Egypt) Walid Hassan		(substituted off) 108'
LW	21	(Egypt) Mohamed Grendo
RW	25	(Egypt) Ahmed Shoukry		(substituted off) 72'
CF	15	(Egypt) Ahmed Gomaa (c)
Substitutes:
GK	16	(Egypt) Mahmoud El Sayed
DF	13	(Egypt) Islam Salah		(substituted on) 115'
DF	35	(Syria) Abdullah Al Shami
MF	8	(Egypt) Amr Moussa		(substituted on) 72'
MF	12	(Egypt) Mostafa Ali
MF	28	(Egypt) Mohamed Abou Shaeshaa
FW	20	(Burkina Faso) Issouf Ouattara		(substituted on) 108'
Manager:
(Egypt) Hossam Hassan

Match officials:

- Assistant referees:
  - Ahmed Al Rashdi (United Arab Emirates)
  - Jassim Abdullah (United Arab Emirates)
- Fourth official: Hamad Ali Youssef (United Arab Emirates)

Match rules

- 90 minutes.
- 30 minutes of extra time if necessary.
- Penalty shoot-out if scores still level.
- Seven named substitutes, of which up to three may be used.
