= Karim Walid =

Egyptian footballer (born 1997)

Karim Nedvěd
Personal information
- Full name: Karim Walid Sayed Saleh Hassan
- Date of birth: 8 August 1997 (age 29)
- Place of birth: Cairo, Egypt
- Height: 1.83 m (6 ft 0 in)
- Positions: Center midfielder; winger

Team information
- Current team: Ceramica Cleopatra FC
- Number: 4

Youth career
- 2005–2014: Al Ahly

Senior career*
| Years | Team | Apps | (Gls) |
| 2014–2025 | Al Ahly | 95 | (7) |
| 2014–2015 | → Haras El Hodood (loan) | 17 | (2) |
| 2015–2016 | → Wadi Degla (loan) | 20 | (1) |
| 2021–2023 | → Future (loan) | 49 | (5) |
| 2025- | Ceramica Cleopatra FC | 12 | (0) |

International career
| 2013–2014 | Egypt U-17 | | |
| 2014–2015 | Egypt U-20 | 6 | (2) |
| 2015–2020 | Egypt U-23 | 0 | (0) |
- * Club domestic league appearances and goals

Karim Walid Sayed Saleh Hassan (Arabic: كريم وليد; born 8 August 1997) commonly known as Nedvěd is an Egyptian professional footballer who plays as a winger for Al Ahly and the Egypt U-20. He is a product of Al Ahly youth academy. He got his nickname in the youth team as his position and looks were similar to the Czech legend Pavel Nedvěd.

== Career statistics ==
As of match played 13 November 2025

| Club | Season | League | | | Egypt Cup | | Continental | | Other | | Total | |
| Club | Season | Division | Apps | Goals | Apps | Goals | Apps | Goals | Apps | Goals | Apps | Goals |
|---|---|---|---|---|---|---|---|---|---|---|---|---|
| Haras El Hodoud (loan) | 2014–15 | Egyptian Premier League | 17 | 2 | 0 | 0 | — | | — | | 17 | 2 |
| Wadi Degla (loan) | 2015–16 | Egyptian Premier League | 20 | 1 | 0 | 0 | — | | — | | 20 | 1 |
| Al Ahly SC | 2015–16 | Egyptian Premier League | 0 | 0 | 1 | 0 | 2 (Note: Appearance(s) in CAF Champions League) | 0 | 0 | 0 | 3 | 0 |
| Al Ahly SC | 2016–17 | Egyptian Premier League | 19 | 1 | 1 | 0 | 4 | 0 | 1 | 0 | 25 | 1 |
| Al Ahly SC | 2017–18 | Egyptian Premier League | 9 | 1 | 0 | 0 | 1 | 0 | 3 (Note: One appearance in Egyptian Super Cup, two appearances in Arab Club Champions Cup) | 0 | 13 | 1 |
| Al Ahly SC | 2018–19 | Egyptian Premier League | 17 | 2 | 2 | 0 | 7 | 3 | 0 | 0 | 27 | 5 |
| Al Ahly SC | 2023–24 | Egyptian Premier League | 13 | 0 | 0 | 0 | 1 | 0 | — | | 14 | 0 |
| Al Ahly SC | 2024–25 | Egyptian Premier League | 0 | 0 | 0 | 0 | 1 | 0 | 1 (Note: Appearance in Egyptian Super Cup) | 0 | 2 | 0 |
| Al Ahly SC | Total | | 58 | 4 | 4 | 0 | 16 | 3 | 5 | 0 | 79 | 7 |
| Future (loan) | 2021–22 | Egyptian Premier League | 31 | 4 | 2 | 0 | — | | — | | 33 | 4 |
| Future (loan) | 2022–23 | Egyptian Premier League | 18 | 1 | 2 | 0 | 10 (Note: Appearances in CAF Confederation Cup) | 0 | — | | 20 | 1 |
| Future (loan) | Total | | 49 | 5 | 4 | 0 | 10 | 0 | — | | 53 | 5 |
| Career total | | | 144 | 12 | 8 | 0 | 26 | 3 | 5 | 0 | 169 | 15 |

== Honours ==
Al Ahly

- Egyptian Premier League: 2016–17, 2017–18, 2018–19, 2023–24
- Egypt Cup: 2017, 2022–23
- Egyptian Super Cup: 2018, 2019, 2023, 2024
- CAF Champions League: 2023–24
- FIFA African–Asian–Pacific Cup: 2024
