= Akram Tawfik =

Egyptian footballer (born 1997)

Akram Tawfik أكرم توفيق
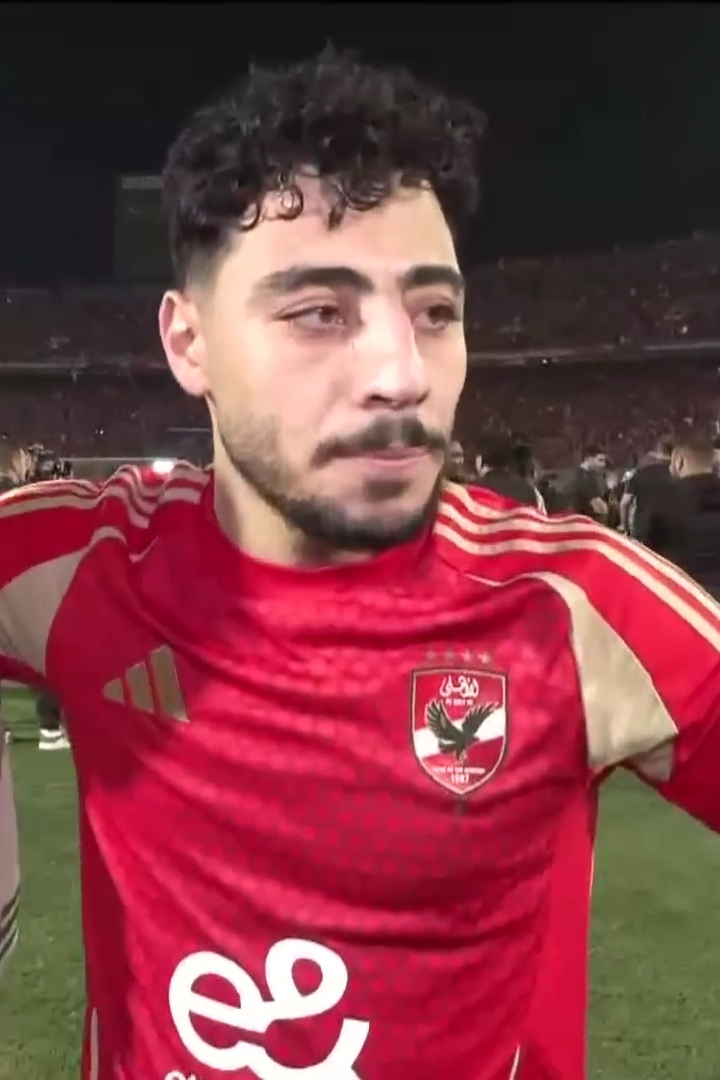
- Akram with Al Ahly SC at 2024 FIFA Intercontinental Cup

Personal information
- Full name: Akram Tawfik Mohamed Hassan Elhagrasi
- Date of birth: 8 November 1997 (age 28)
- Place of birth: Kafr Saqr, Egypt
- Height: 1.83 m (6 ft 0 in)
- Positions: Right-back; defensive midfielder

Team information
- Current team: Al Ahly
- Number: 12

Youth career
- 2005–2014: ENPPI

Senior career*
Years	Team	Apps	(Gls)
2015–2016	ENPPI	18	(0)
2016–2025	Al Ahly	88	(2)
2019–2020	→ El Gouna (loan)	40	(3)
2025–2026	Al-Shamal	18	(0)
2026–	Al Ahly	0	(0)

International career
2013–2014	Egypt U-17		
2015–2017	Egypt U-20	6	(0)
2018–2021	Egypt U-23	12	(0)
2021–	Egypt	12	(1)
Medal record
Men's football
Representing Egypt
Africa Cup of Nations
Runner-up	2021 Cameroon
Africa U-23 Cup of Nations
Winner	Egypt 2019	Egypt U23
- * Club domestic league appearances and goals

Akram Tawfik Mohamed Hassan Elhagrasi (Arabic: أكرم توفيق محمد حسن الهجرسي; born 8 November 1997) is an Egyptian professional footballer who plays as a right-back or a defensive midfielder for Al Ahly and the Egypt national team.

He is a product of the ENPPI youth system. Akram is the younger brother of Abdelaziz Tawfik and Ahmed Tawfik, Egyptian international footballers.

== Personal life ==
His brothers Abdelaziz and Ahmed are also professional footballers.

== Career statistics ==
=== Club ===
As of match played 12 March 2024

Appearances and goals by club, season and competition
Club	Season	League			Cup		Continental		Other		Total	
Club	Season	Division	Apps	Goals	Apps	Goals	Apps	Goals	Apps	Goals	Apps	Goals
ENPPI	2015–16	Egyptian Premier League	18	0	2	0	—				20	0
Al Ahly	2016–17	Egyptian Premier League	5	0	2	0	0	0	0	0	7	0
Al Ahly	2017–18	Egyptian Premier League	4	0	0	0	4	0	0	0	8	0
Al Ahly	2018–19	Egyptian Premier League	3	0	1	0	0	0	0	0	4	0
Al Ahly	Total		12	0	3	0	4	0	0	0	19	0
El Gouna	2018–19	Egyptian Premier League	10	1	0	0	—				10	1
El Gouna	2019–20	Egyptian Premier League	30	2	1	0	—				31	2
El Gouna	Total		40	3	1	0	—				41	3
Al Ahly SC	2019–20	Egyptian Premier League	0	0	1	0	0	0	0	0	1	0
Al Ahly SC	2020–21	Egyptian Premier League	21	1	2	0	8	0	3	0	34	1
Al Ahly SC	2021–22	Egyptian Premier League	7	0	0	0	2	0	2	0	11	0
Al Ahly SC	2022-23	Egyptian Premier League	8	1	1	0	2	0	0	0	11	1
Al Ahly SC	2023-24	Egyptian Premier League	4	0	0	0	3	0	4	0	11	0
Al Ahly SC	Total		40	2	4	0	15	0	9	0	68	2
Career Total			110	5	10	0	19	0	9	0	148	5

=== International ===
National Team	Year	Apps	Goals
Egypt U-20	2017	2	0
Egypt U-23	2018	2	0
Egypt U-23	2019	12	0
Egypt U-23	2020	2	0
Egypt U-23	2021	6	0
Egypt	2021	8 (Note: Four appearances in FIFA Arab Cup)	0
Egypt	2022	2 (Note: One appearance in Africa Cup of Nations)	1
Egypt	2024	2 (Note: Two appearances in FIFA Series)	0
Total		36	1

Scores and results list Turkey's goal tally first.

List of international goals scored by Akram Tawkif
No.	Date	Venue	Opponent	Score	Result	Competition
1.	12 November 2021	Estádio 11 de Novembro, Luanda, Angola	Angola	2–2	2–2	2022 FIFA World Cup qualification

== Honours ==
Al Ahly

- Egyptian Premier League: 2016–17, 2017–18, 2018–19, 2022–23, 2023–24
- Egypt Cup: 2016–17, 2019–20, 2022–23
- Egyptian Super Cup: 2021–22, 2022–23, 2023–24
- CAF Champions League: 2020–21, 2022–23, 2023-24
- CAF Super Cup: 2021
- FIFA African–Asian–Pacific Cup: 2024

Egypt U23

- Africa U-23 Cup of Nations: 2019
