= Ahmed El Sheikh (footballer, born 1992) =

Egyptian footballer

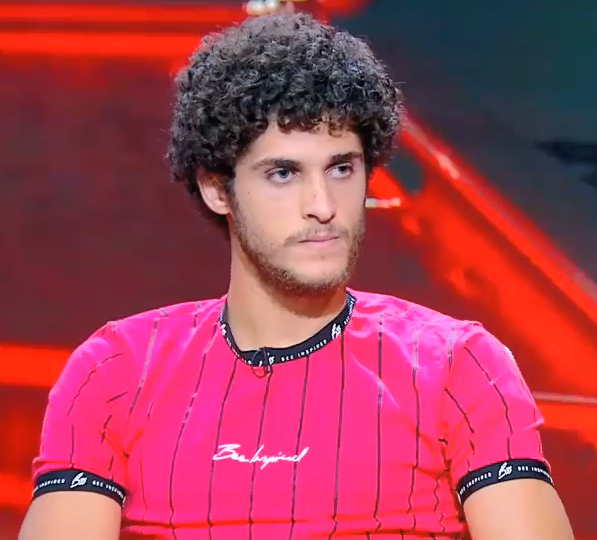
- El Sheikh in 2020

Personal information
- Full name: Ahmed El Sheikh
- Date of birth: 11 September 1992 (age 34)
- Place of birth: Beni Suef, Egypt
- Height: 1.84 m (6 ft 0 in)
- Position: Winger

Youth career
- Telephonat Beni Suef

Senior career*
Years	Team	Apps	(Gls)
2012–2014	Telephonat Beni Suef	9	(0)
2014–2015	Misr Lel Makkasa	20	(8)
2015–2020	Al Ahly	28	(9)
2016–2017	→ Misr Lel Makkasa (loan)	27	(17)
2017–2018	→ Al-Ettifaq (loan)	9	(1)
2020–2021	Pyramids	6	(1)
2021–2023	Al Masry	33	(3)
2023	FK Příbram	0	(0)
2023-2024	Al Ittihad Alexandria	25	(0)
2024-2025	Ismaily SC	11	(2)

International career
2017	Egypt	3	(2)
- * Club domestic league appearances and goals as of 1 July 2024

Ahmed El Sheikh (Arabic: أحمد الشيخ; born 11 September 1992) is an Egyptian professional footballer who plays as a winger for Egypt national team.

== International goals ==
Scores and results list Egypt's goal tally first.

No.	Date	Venue	Opponent	Score	Result	Competition
1.	28 March 2017	Borg El Arab Stadium, Alexandria, Egypt	Togo	2–0	3–0	Friendly
2.	13 August 2017	Alexandria Stadium, Alexandria, Egypt	Morocco	1–0	1–1	2018 African Nations Championship qualification

== Titles ==
Al Ahly

- Egyptian Premier League (4): 2015–16, 2017–18, 2018–19, 2019-20
- Egypt Cup (1): 2019–20
- Egyptian Super Cup (3): 2015, 2018, 2019
- CAF Champions League (1): 2019–20

Individual

- Egyptian Premier League Top scorer: 2016–17
