= Phakamani Mahlambi =

South African footballer (born 1997)

Personal information
- Full name: Phakamani Lungisani Mahlambi
- Date of birth: 12 September 1997 (age 29)
- Place of birth: Johannesburg, South Africa
- Height: 1.73 m (5 ft 8 in)
- Position: Attacking midfielder

Youth career
- 2011–2013: Transnet School of Excellence
- 2013–2015: Bidvest Wits

Senior career*
| Years | Team | Apps | (Gls) |
| 2015–2017 | Bidvest Wits | 27 | (9) |
| 2017–2018 | Al Ahly | 12 | (1) |
| 2018–2022 | Mamelodi Sundowns | 26 | (4) |
| 2020–2021 | → AmaZulu (loan) | 2 | (0) |
| 2021 | → Chippa United (loan) | 3 | (1) |

International career^{‡}
| 2015–2017 | South Africa U23 | 7 | (1) |
| 2017–2020 | South Africa | 2 | (0) |
- * Club domestic league appearances and goals as of 11:44, 1 October 2020 (UTC) ‡ National team caps and goals as of 9 October 2018

Phakamani Lungisani Mahlambi (born 12 September 1997) is a South African professional soccer player.

== Career ==
=== Bidvest Wits ===
Mahlambi started his professional career at Bidvest Wits. He made his debut for the side under manager Gavin Hunt during the 2014–15 season in a 2–1 win over Ajax Cape Town. He became a regular for the Premier Soccer League scoring crucial goals for the side. He scored a brace against Platinum Stars in a 4–0 win. He continued his rich vein of form by scoring another goal against Chippa United.

In February 2016, Mahlambi suffered a torn medial collateral ligament in a 2–1 win over Maritzburg United. He was ruled out for 10 months and as a result missed the remainder of the season and the chance to represent South Africa at the 2016 Olympic Games. Following the injury, Mahlambi required surgery to reattach the ligament in the knee. Doctors revealed that a strand from his hamstring would be removed to do so but indicated that such a procedure would likely have a negative effect his career. In order to avoid such a scenario, Mahlambi's brother, a trialist with Wits himself at the time, provided his own hamstring for the operation. He made his return from injury in December and scored a brace a league win over Free State Stars.

The following year, he was invited to trial with Portuguese side Vitória de Guimarães, but a permanent move failed to materialize.

=== Al Ahly ===
Mahalmbi signed a four-year contract with Al Ahly SC on 7 September 2017 for a reported fee of €R1.3 million. Upon joining the club, he became the first South African footballer ever to play in Egypt. Four days later, he scored a brace on his non-competitive debut for the club in a 6–0 friendly win over El Gouna. On 20 November Mahalambi made his first official debut in Egyptian Premier League against Ismaily SC in 2–0 win. Phakamani scored his first goal with Al Ahly against El Mokawloon on 8 February 2018.

=== Mamelodi Sundowns ===
Mahlambi moved from Al Ahly to Mamelodi Sundowns, but after several loan moves he would become a free agent in 2022.

== International career ==
=== Under-23 ===
He started his international career playing for the South African Under-23. He assisted the team to qualify for the Rio Olympics for the first time in 15 years. For South Africa to earn this achievement, Mahlambi scored a goal and assisted a further three. He scored the winning penalty in the third place playoff against the hosts Senegal.

== Honours ==
Egyptian Premier League

- Winner: 2017-2018

South African Premier league

- Winner:2016-2017, 2018-2019, 2019–20

MTN 8 Cup

- Winner: 2016

Nedbank Cup

- Winner:2019–20

Telkom Knockout

- Winner: 2019
