= Hesham Mohamed =

Egyptian footballer (born 1990)

Personal information
- Full name: Hesham Mohamed Hussien Mohamed Hassan
- Date of birth: January 3, 1990 (age 36)
- Place of birth: Cairo, Egypt
- Height: 1.70 m (5 ft 7 in)
- Position: Midfielder

Team information
- Current team: Ismaily SC
- Number: 17

Youth career
- Al Ahly

Senior career*
Years	Team	Apps	(Gls)
2007–2012	Al Ahly	3	(0)
2011	→ Smouha (loan)	3	(0)
2011–2012	→ Ittihad El Shorta (loan)	3	(0)
2012–2017	Misr Lel Makkasa	99	(7)
2017–2019	Al Ahly	29	(0)
2019–2020	Al Ittihad Alexandria	20	
2020–21	Misr El-Makasa	23	(0)
2021–23	Pyramids FC	16	(0)
2023-	Ismaily SC	39	(0)

International career^{‡}
2008–2009	Egypt U20	2	(0)
2011– 2012	Egypt U23	13	(1)
2017–	Egypt	1	(0)
- * Club domestic league appearances and goals as of 1 April 2021 ‡ National team caps and goals as of 1 April 2021

Hesham Mohamed Hussien Mohamed Hassan (Arabic: هشام محمد حسين محمد حسن; born 3 January 1990) is an Egyptian professional footballer. He plays as a midfielder for Egyptian Premier League club Pyramids, as well as the Egypt U20 and U23 national team.

Hesham Mohamed He is the brother of the player Hosam Mohamed.

== International career ==
=== International goals ===
Scores and results list Egypt's goal tally first.

No	Date	Venue	Opponent	Score	Result	Competition
-	13 May 2017	30 June Stadium, Cairo, Egypt	Yemen	1–0	1–0	Unofficial friendly
