= Ahmed Fathy =

Egyptian footballer (born 1984)

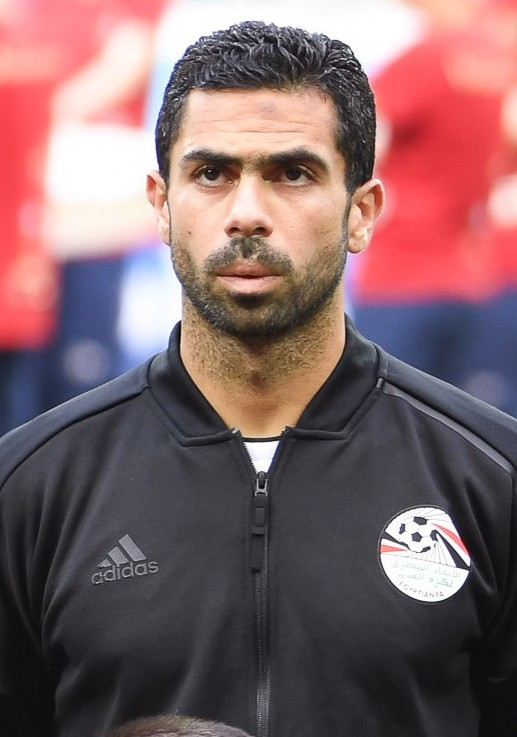
- Fathy with Egypt at the 2018 FIFA World Cup

Personal information
- Full name: Ahmed Fathy Abdelmonem Ahmed Ibrahim
- Date of birth: 10 November 1984 (age 42)
- Place of birth: Benha, Egypt
- Height: 1.76 m (5 ft 9 in)
- Position: Full-back

Youth career
- Ismaily

Senior career*
Years	Team	Apps	(Gls)
2001–2007	Ismaily	73	(7)
2007	Sheffield United	3	(0)
2007–2014	Al Ahly	106	(12)
2007–2008	→ Kazma (loan)	21	(4)
2013	→ Hull City (loan)	7	(0)
2014–2015	Umm Salal	17	(1)
2015–2020	Al Ahly	114	(4)
2020–2024	Pyramids	62	(0)
Total		403	(28)

International career^{‡}
2012	Egypt Olympic (O.P.)	?	(?)
2002–2021	Egypt	136	(3)
Medal record
Representing Egypt
Africa Cup of Nations
Winner	2006 Egypt
Winner	2008 Ghana
Winner	2010 Angola
Pan Arab Games
Gold medal – first place	2007 Cairo
African Youth Championship
Winner	2003 Burkina Faso
- * Club domestic league appearances and goals as of 16 August 2024 ‡ National team caps and goals as of 16 August 2024

Ahmed Fathy Abdelmonem Ahmed Ibrahim (Egyptian Arabic: أحمد فتحى عبد المنعم أحمد إبراهيم; born 10 November 1984) is an Egyptian former professional footballer who played as a full-back.

Considered by some as one of Africa's best-ever full-backs, Fathy started his career with Egyptian side Ismaily SC before moving to England to play in the Premier League with Sheffield United in 2007. Fathy returned to Egypt after only a few months however, signing for Al Ahly where he remained until April 2020 when he signed for Pyramids FC, whilst also spending some time on loan at both the Kuwait side Kazma and Hull City back in England. Alongside his club career, Fathy represented Egypt from 2002, playing over one hundred games and scoring nine goals for his country.

== Club career ==
=== Early career: Ismaily and Sheffield United ===
Fathy was born in Banha, He played as a midfielder and right-back for Ismaily in Egypt, where he won the 2001–02 Egyptian Premier League. In early 2007, Egyptian newspaper Al-Ahram reported that Fathy's club had accepted Sheffield United's £700,000 offer for the player, and after a number of weeks of protracted negotiations, Fathy signed a three-and-a-half-year contract on 24 January 2007. Fathy made his Premier League debut for United as a substitute in the closing minutes of a 2–1 victory over Tottenham Hotspur at Bramall Lane on 10 February 2007, and made his full first team debut at Anfield against Liverpool on 24 February 2007, but failed to hold down a regular spot for the Blades.

=== Al Ahly ===
Fathy had been linked with a move to the Egyptian club El Zamalek for €2 million after discussions with Sheffield United's management, but the player refused the transfer even though the clubs had agreed a fee – with Fathy insisting he wanted to continue his career as a professional player outside of Egypt. However, El Zamalek's Egyptian rivals Al Ahly succeeded in gaining Fathy's consent for a move and Sheffield United's agreement to a deal. On 10 September 2007 Fathy joined El-Ahly for a fee of £675,000 after making just three senior appearances for United in the eight months he had spent with the club.

Fathy had been signed after the transfer window in Egypt had closed however, and with Al-Ahly being unable to register him to play until the following January, they looked to place Fathy on loan outside of the country to help to regain match fitness. Al Ahly managed to broker a deal with Kuwaiti side Kazma to accept the player on a loan, where Fathy played regularly for the first team, scoring four goals. Fathy finally made his Al Ahly debut in an away game against Arab Contractors on 10 March 2008, and went on to become Ahly's first choice in central midfield alongside Hossam Ashour. Following the departure of Ahmed Sedik in 2009, Fathy was moved to right back where he once again became a regular for the team.

==== Loan to Hull City ====
In January 2013, English Championship side Hull City expressed an interest in signing Fathy, along with his teammate Gedo, on loan until the end of the 2012–13 season. On 31 January 2013, Hull City had finalized a six-month loan deal for Fathy and Gedo, with Hull paying £500,000 for each player's services. Fathy made his debut on 16 February 2013 at home in a 1–0 win against Charlton Athletic, appearing as a second-half substitute for Paul McShane.

=== Umm Salal ===
Fathy left Al Ahly after his contract expired in June 2014 and joined Umm Salal in Qatar in August 2014 after an unsuccessful trial with English giants Arsenal.

=== Return to Al Ahly ===
Fathy rejoined Al Ahly in 2015. In April 2020, he decided to leave the club by the end of the season.

=== Pyramids FC and retirement ===
On 11 April 2020, Pyramids FC announced that Fathy would be joining their side at the end of the season on a free transfer after Al Ahly's failure of securing a contract renewal with the 35 year old defender. On 21 September 2024, he announced his retirement from football.

== International career ==
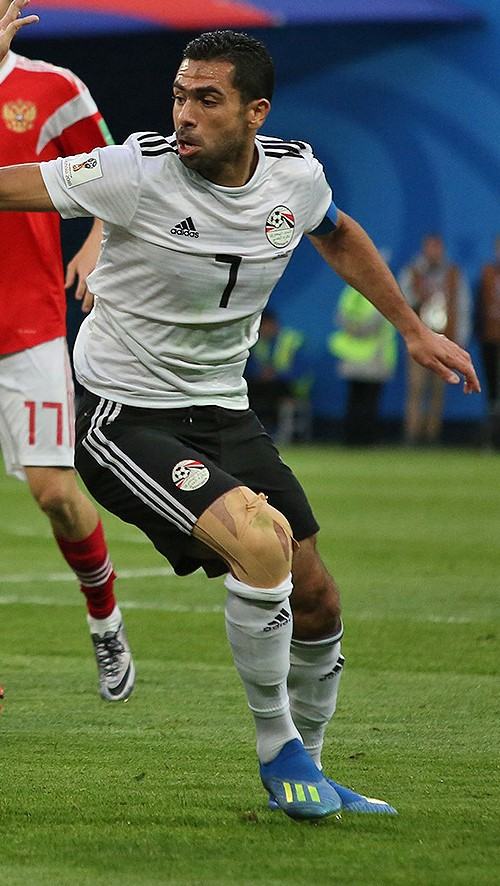
Fathy playing for Egypt at the 2018 FIFA World Cup.

Fathy became the Egypt national team's youngest ever international when he was capped at 17 years old in 2001 against South Africa. Fathy was picked for the National team by Egyptian Coach Mohsen Saleh even before playing in his club's first team Ismaily SC, although this followed soon after, and was then called up for the Egyptian youth team. Fathy was a member of the Egyptian youth team that won the African Youth Cup 2003 in Burkina Faso, and was part of the Egypt squad at the FIFA U-20 World Cup in the United Arab Emirates in 2003, and at one point Fathy was part of Egypt's U-20, U-23 and senior squads at the same time. Fathy was also part of the Egypt squad that won the Africa Cup of Nations at the Cairo International Stadium in 2006, when they beat Ivory Coast on penalties in the final.

In the 2010 Africa Cup of Nations, Fathy was named as the fair player of the tournament and he was named in the team of the tournament.

In May 2018, he was named in Egypt's squad for the 2018 FIFA World Cup in Russia. He scored an own goal in the match against Russia.

== Career statistics ==
As of match played 16 November 2021

Appearances and goals by national team and year
National team	Year	Apps	Goals
Egypt	2002	1	0
Egypt	2003	3	0
Egypt	2004	10	0
Egypt	2005	12	0
Egypt	2006	9	0
Egypt	2007	3	1
Egypt	2008	10	1
Egypt	2009	15	0
Egypt	2010	12	1
Egypt	2011	8	0
Egypt	2012	5	0
Egypt	2013	11	0
Egypt	2014	9	0
Egypt	2015	1	0
Egypt	2016	4	0
Egypt	2017	11	0
Egypt	2018	6	0
Egypt	2019	2	0
Egypt	2020	0	0
Egypt	2021	2	0
Total		134	3

Scores and results list Egypt's goal tally first, score column indicates score after each Fathy goal.

List of international goals scored by Ahmed Fathy
No.	Date	Venue	Opponent	Score	Result	Competition
1	7 February 2007	Cairo International Stadium, Cairo, Egypt	Sweden	2–0	2–0	Friendly
2	7 February 2008	Baba Yara Stadium, Kumasi, Ghana	Ivory Coast	1–0	4–1	2008 Africa Cup of Nations
3	11 August 2010	Cairo International Stadium, Cairo, Egypt	DR Congo	3–1	6–3	Friendly

== Honours ==
Ismaily

- Egyptian Premier League: 2001–02

Al Ahly

- Egyptian Premier League: 2007–08, 2008–09, 2009–10, 2010–11, 2013–14, 2015–16, 2016–17, 2017–18, 2018–19, 2019–20
- Egypt Cup: 2016–17, 2019–20
- Egyptian Super Cup: 2008, 2010, 2012, 2015, 2018, 2019
- CAF Champions League: 2008, 2012, 2013, 2019–20
- CAF Super Cup: 2009, 2014

Pyramids

- Egypt Cup: 2023–24

Egypt

- Africa Cup of Nations: 2006, 2008, 2010
- Pan Arab Games: 2007

Egypt U20

- African Youth Championship: 2003

Individual

- CAF Team of the Year: 2012, 2013, 2017
- IFFHS CAF Men's Team of the Decade 2011–2020

== See also ==
- List of men's footballers with 100 or more international caps

Sporting positions
Preceded by Hossam Ashour	Al Ahly SC captain 2020	Succeeded by Mohamed El Shenawy
