= Abdullah Al Shami =

Syrian footballer (born 1994)

Personal information
- Date of birth: 2 March 1994 (age 32)
- Place of birth: Hamah, Syria
- Height: 1.82 m (6 ft 0 in)
- Positions: Centre-back; right back

Team information
- Current team: Al-Yarmouk

Youth career
- Al-Taliya

Senior career*
Years	Team	Apps	(Gls)
2011–2017	Al-Taliya		
2017	Al-Ahly	0	(0)
2018	Al-Masry	2	(0)
2018–2019	Al-Taliya		
2019–2023	Al-Fahaheel		
2023–2024	Al-Nasr		
2024–2025	Al-Karamah		
2025	→ Al-Salt (loan)	11	(0)
2025–	→ Al-Yarmouk		

International career^{‡}
2012–2014	Syria U-20		
2015–2016	Syria U-23		
2019–	Syria	26	(0)
- * Club domestic league appearances and goals ‡ National team caps and goals as of 17 November 2026

Abdullah Al Shami (Arabic: عبدالله الشامي; born 2 March 1994) is a Syrian professional footballer who plays as a defender for Kuwaiti club Al-Yarmouk and the Syria national team.
