= Junior Ajayi =

Nigerian footballer (born 1996)

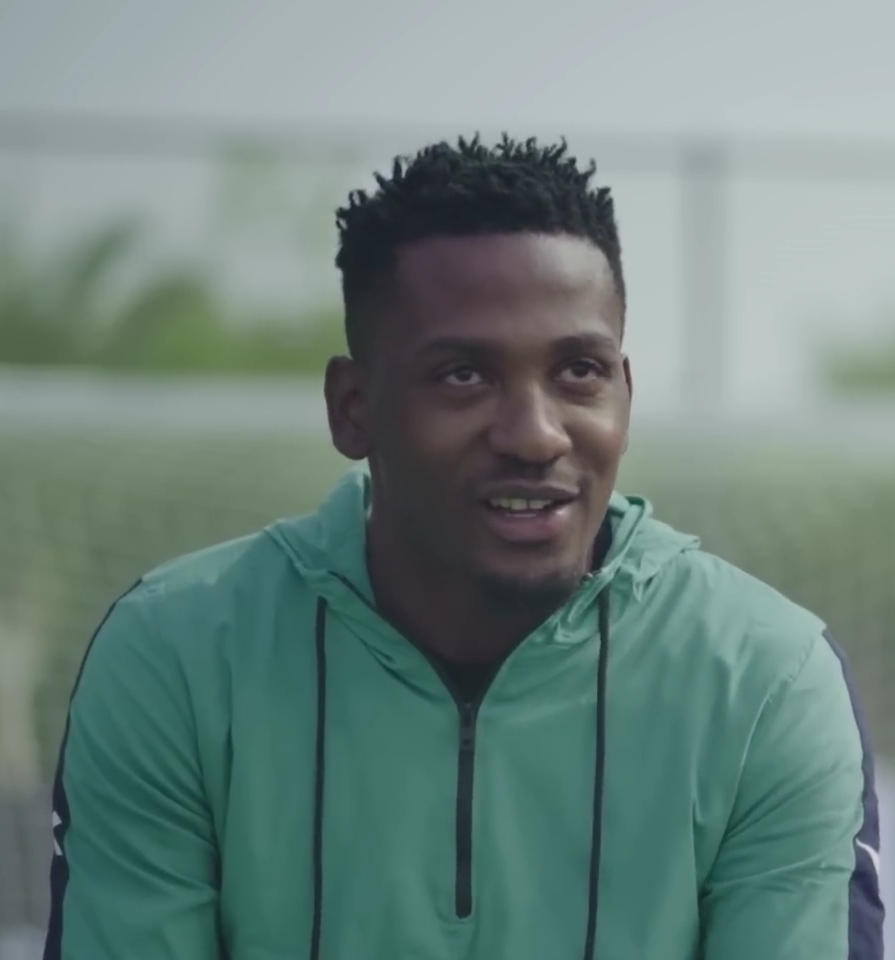

Personal information
- Full name: Oluwafemi Junior Ajayi
- Date of birth: 29 January 1996 (age 30)
- Place of birth: Lagos, Nigeria
- Height: 1.85 m (6 ft 1 in)
- Position: Striker

Senior career*
Years	Team	Apps	(Gls)
2015–2016	CS Sfaxien	28	(10)
2016–2021	Al Ahly	103	(30)
2022	Al-Nasr		
2022–2025	Smouha	8	(4)
2025	Al Hilal	15	(1)
2025–2026	Al-Wehdat	1	(0)

International career
2018	Nigeria	1	(0)
Medal record
Men's Football
Representing Nigeria
Summer Olympics
Bronze medal – third place	2016 Rio de Janeiro	Team
- * Club domestic league appearances and goals as of 15:17, 17 March 2026 (UTC)

Oluwafemi Junior Ajayi (born 29 January 1996), commonly known as Junior Ajayi, is a Nigerian professional footballer who plays as a striker.

He was selected in Nigeria's 18-man squad for the 2016 Summer Olympics, after helping them qualify for Rio with his decisive goals. With Nigeria, he won the Olympic bronze medal. Junior Ajayi helped Egyptian giants Al Ahly secure 2 CAF Champion Leagues, 2019–20 and 2020–21. However, following the arrival of Percy Tau and Luís Miquissone, he was never selected by Pitso Mosimane for matches and demanded Al Ahly to terminate his contract. He eventually found himself in Libyan side Al Nasr-Benghazi. On 30 July 2022, Junior Ajayi returned to Egypt by signing for Alexandria-based Smouha.

== Career statistics ==
=== International ===
Appearances and goals by national team and year
National team	Year	Apps	Goals
Nigeria	2018	1	0
Total		1	0

== Honours ==
Al Ahly

- Egyptian Premier League: 2016–17, 2017–18, 2018–19, 2019–20
- Egypt Cup: 2016–17, 2019–20
- Egyptian Super Cup: 2018, 2019; runner-up: 2017, 2020
- CAF Champions League: 2019–20, 2020–21; runner-up: 2017, 2018
- FIFA Club World Cup third place: 2020

Nigeria U23

- Summer Olympics third place: 2016
