= Issouf Ouattara =

Burkinabé footballer

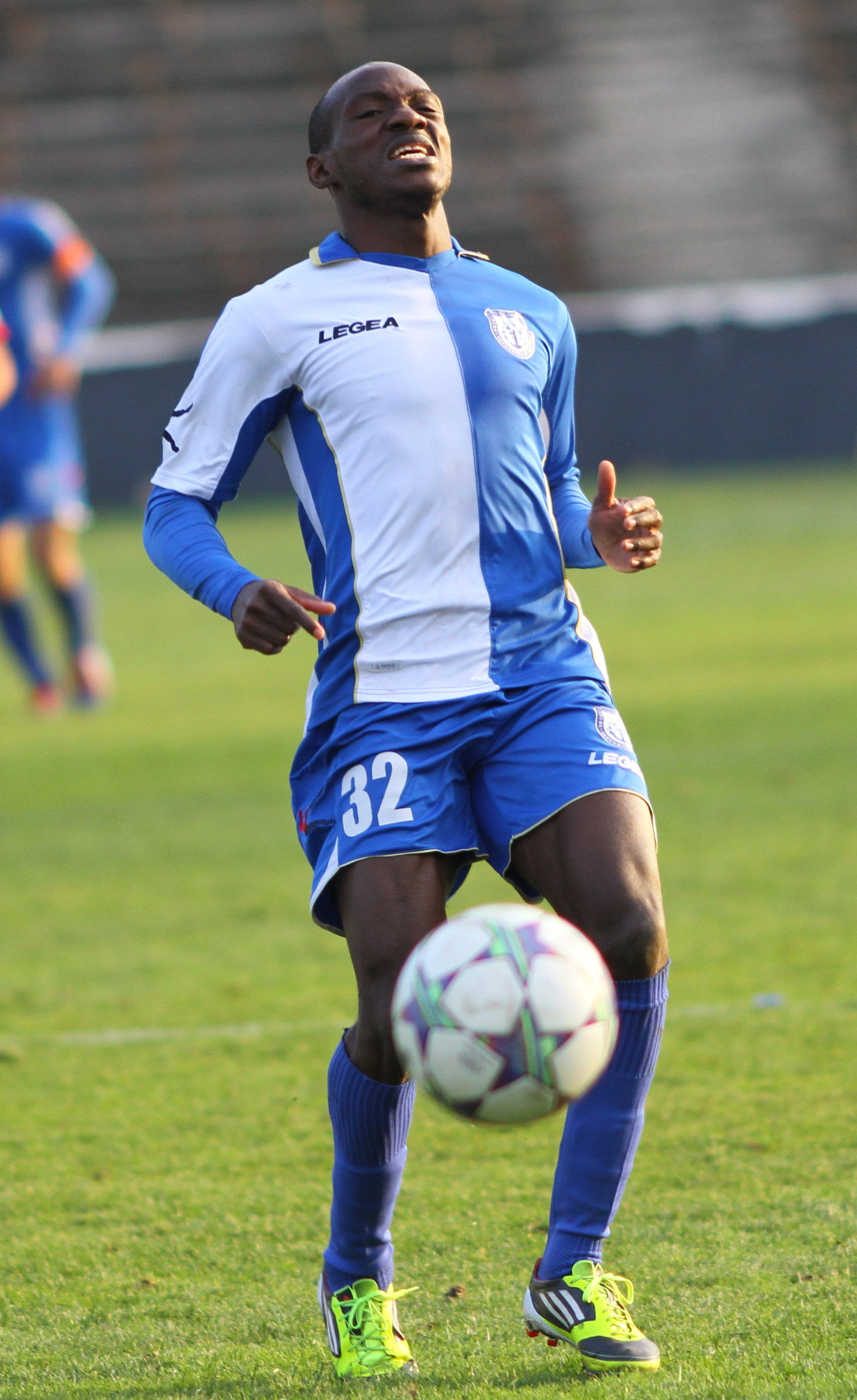
- Ouattara playing for Chernomorets Burgas in 2012

Personal information
- Date of birth: 7 October 1988 (age 38)
- Place of birth: Ouagadougou, Burkina Faso
- Height: 1.83 m (6 ft 0 in)
- Position: Forward

Senior career*
Years	Team	Apps	(Gls)
2007–2008	Etoile Filante	26	(2)
2008–2011	União Leiria	37	(1)
2010–2011	→ Trofense (loan)	8	(0)
2011–2012	Nîmes	16	(1)
2012–2013	Chernomorets Burgas	25	(4)
2014	Al Akhdar		
2015	Al-Nasr		
2015	Ermis	7	(0)
2016–2017	ASEC Mimosas		
2017–2018	Wadi Degla	15	(5)
2018	Al Masry	13	(0)
2018–2019	Al-Talaba SC		(0)
2019	Wej		
2020	Al-Sharq		

International career
2007–2013	Burkina Faso	11	(2)
Medal record
Representing Burkina Faso
Africa Cup of Nations
Runner-up	2013 South Africa
- * Club domestic league appearances and goals

Issouf Ouattara (born 7 October 1988) is a Burkinabé professional footballer who plays as a forward.

== Club career ==
Born in Ouagadougou, Ouattara began his career in Etoile Filante Ouagadougou. In July 2008 he signed with Portugal's U.D. Leiria in the Segunda Liga, and played his first game on 30 August in a 1–0 home loss against Portimonense where he came on as a second-half substitute. He contributed with 26 matches (one goal) as the club promoted back to the Primeira Liga, but appeared significantly less in the following year.

In September 2011, after spending the 2010–11 season on loan to Trofense– second level, less than one third of the matches played – Ouattara left Leiria and signed for Nïmes in the French division three. In the following campaign he moved teams and countries again, joining Bulgaria's Chernomorets Burgas after a period of trial.

In his only full season in the country, Ouattara was voted his club's Best Foreign Player in a poll conducted in its official website, earning over 1,000 votes. He was released in late 2013.

== International career ==
Ouattara made his debut for Burkina Faso not yet aged 19, helping to a 1–1 home draw against Mozambique on 24 March 2007 for the 2008 Africa Cup of Nations qualifiers. He was selected for the 2013 edition of the tournament on 8 January, playing against Togo in the quarter-finals in an eventual runner-up finish for the nation.

== Career statistics ==
Scores and results list Burkina Faso's goal tally first, score column indicates score after each Ouattara goal.

List of international goals scored by Issouf Ouattara
No.	Date	Venue	Opponent	Score	Result	Competition
1	21 June 2008	Stade du 4-Août, Burkina Faso	Seychelles	3–1	4–1	2010 World Cup qualification
