= David Massamba =

Gabonese footballer

Personal information
- Date of birth: 4 June 1992 (age 34)
- Place of birth: Kinshasa, Zaïre
- Height: 1.75 m (5 ft 9 in)
- Position: Midfielder

Team information
- Current team: CS Hammam-Lif

Senior career*
Years	Team	Apps	(Gls)
2012–2014	US Bitam		
2015–2018	CF Mounana		
2018–	CS Hammam-Lif	28	(1)

International career^{‡}
2015	Gabon	4	(0)
- * Club domestic league appearances and goals as of 13 July 2020 ‡ National team caps and goals as of 13 June 2021

David Massamba (born 4 June 1992) is a Gabonese football midfielder who plays for CS Hammam-Lif.
