= Amr Barakat =

Egyptian footballer (born 1991)

Personal information
- Full name: Amr Barakat Elbolasy
- Date of birth: 1 October 1991 (age 35)
- Place of birth: Cairo, Egypt
- Height: 1.87 m (6 ft 2 in)
- Position: Midfielder

Team information
- Current team: El Gouna
- Number: 17

Youth career
- 1996–2006: Al Ahly
- 2007–2012: Zamalek

Senior career*
Years	Team	Apps	(Gls)
2013–2016	Misr Lel-Makkasa	48	(9)
2016	Lierse	2	(0)
2017–2019	Al Ahly	1	(0)
2018	→ Al-Shabab (loan)	8	(0)
2019	→ Smouha (loan)	7	(0)
2019–	El Gouna	2	(0)
- * Club domestic league appearances and goals as of 13:06, 17 December 2019 (UTC)

Amr Barakat (born 1 October 1991) is an Egyptian footballer currently playing for Egyptian club El Gouna.

== Youth ==
Entering the Al Ahly S.C. youth academy at age 5 as a left-winger, he left them at aged 15 to Zamalek SC.

== Career ==
=== Lierse ===
Playing for Lierse S.K., Amr scored a hat-trick in an 8–2 victory over Royal Stade Waremmien F.C. in the Belgian Cup in June 2016.

=== Return to Al Ahly ===
He signed a contract for the duration of three years to transfer back to Al Ahly S.C. He was included in the Al Ahly S.C. 22-man squad versus Ismaily SC, he has not scored a goal yet for Al Ahly S.C.

== Career statistics ==
Club	Season	League		Cup		League Cup		Other		Total	
Club	Season	Apps	Goals	Apps	Goals	Apps	Goals	Apps	Goals	Apps	Goals
Misr Lel Makasa	2013–2014	4	0	0	0	—				4	0
Misr Lel Makasa	2014–2015	20	3	3	0	—				23	3
Misr Lel Makasa	2015–2016	24	6	1	0	6	3	—		31	9
Misr Lel Makasa	Total	48	9	4	0	6	3	—		58	12
Lierse	2016–2017	2	0	1	3	—				3	3
Lierse	Total	2	0	1	3	—				3	3
Al Ahly	2016–2017	1	0	0	0	0	0	3	2	4	2
Al Ahly	Total	1	0	0	0	0	0	3	2	4	2
Al Shabab	2017–2018	8	0	1	0	—				9	0
Al Shabab	Total	8	0	1	0	—				9	0
