= Marwan Mohsen =

Egyptian footballer (born 1989)

Marwan Mohsen مَرْوَان مُحْسِن
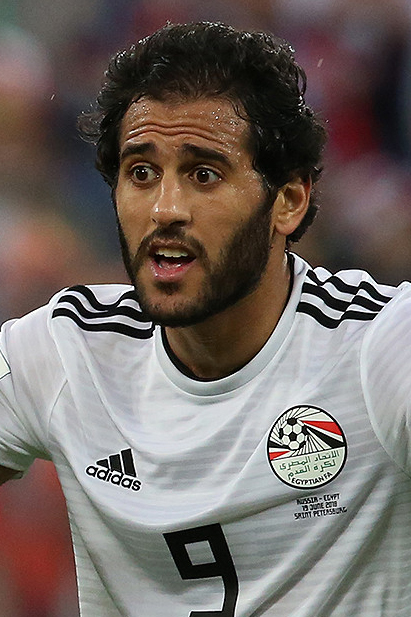
- Mohsen with Egypt at the 2018 FIFA World Cup

Personal information
- Full name: Marwan Mohsen Fahmy Tharwat Gameldin Mahmoud Fahmy
- Date of birth: 26 February 1989 (age 37)
- Place of birth: Cairo, Egypt
- Height: 1.87 m (6 ft 2 in)
- Position: Striker

Team information
- Current team: El Gouna
- Number: 9

Senior career*
Years	Team	Apps	(Gls)
2009–2014	Petrojet	61	(11)
2014–2015	Gil Vicente	20	(0)
2015–2016	Ismaily	32	(14)
2016–2021	Al Ahly	73	(17)
2021–2024	Future	49	(12)
2025-	El Gouna	3	(0)

International career^{‡}
2012	Egypt U20	3	(1)
2012	Egypt U23	4	(1)
2011–2019	Egypt	35	(7)
Medal record
Representing Egypt
Men's football
Africa Cup of Nations
Runner-up	2017 Gabon
- * Club domestic league appearances and goals as of 23 April 2024 ‡ National team caps and goals as of 26 March 2021

Marwan Mohsen Fahmy Tharwat Gameldin Mahmoud Fahmy (Arabic: مَرْوَان مُحْسِن فَهْمِيّ ثَرْوَت جَمَال الدِّين مَحْمُود فَهْمِيّ; born 26 February 1989) is an Egyptian professional footballer who plays as a striker for El Gouna.

Mohsen made his debut with Egypt on 3 September 2011 against Sierra Leone in a 2012 Africa Cup of Nations qualifier, where he also scored his first international goal.

== Club career ==
=== Petrojet ===
After the impressive performance in the Egyptian Second division side in the first half of the 2009–2010 season, Egyptian Premier League side Petrojet signed him for the rest of the season in the winter transfer window. He made his debut on 13 May 2010 against El Gaish. He earned a spot on Hany Ramzy's Egypt U-23 squad, who were trying to qualify for the 2011 All-Africa Games and the 2012 Summer Olympics, after finishing with a good 2010–11 season with 4 goals. He finished with 2 goals in the unfinished 2011–12 Egyptian Premier League season due to the Port Said Stadium disaster.

In early June 2012, Mohsen's Petrojet coach told the media that “He will move to Europe and the board is studying offers from a number of big clubs,” and continued on to say “Marwan Mohsen is one of the best forwards in Egypt and his place is in the big European leagues.” Interest from Egyptian giants Al Ahly and Zamalek as well as European teams grew exponentially as he succeeded with the Egypt U-23 team leading up to the 2012 Summer Olympics.

After performing extraordinarily well in the 2012 Toulon Tournament and playing well in 2012 Summer Olympics finishing with incredible goal scoring record (21 goals in 31 matches), Mohsen had the interest from Egyptian, Gulf, and European clubs. In the end of August, he demanded a transfer away from the club (preferably outside Egypt) so that he can "solidify his place in Egypt's first team." Unfortunately, Mohsen got Virus C in September which would see him out of action for 2–3 months. He made his return late October in a friendly match against El Gouna after being 2 months out. He played a part in the match scoring a goal in a 3–1 win for Petrojet. On the first of November, Petrojet assistant coach, Samir Sabry, said that Mohsen had officially been cured from Virus C and had also been carrying Hepatitis C ever since the end of the 2012 London Olympics but he had also cured from that as well. He had later played friendly matches in a 3–1 loss to Wadi Degla, Mohsen scoring his club's only goal, and a 3–0 loss to Haras El-Hodood. Later on, in a friendly match against Egyptian giants Al Ahly, he assisted his side's goal in an entertaining 1–2 loss in front of a large audience. A few weeks later, Petrojet played yet another friendly match with the other Egyptian giants, Ahly rivals Zamalek. Mohsen scored two goals in Petrojet's surprise 2–1 win. After his return from injury, he had scored 4 goals and assisted 2 others in 5 friendlies.

As soon the 2012–13 season finally kicked off, Mohsen was at loggerheads with the coaching staff and the board due to his persistence on leaving the club to help ensure his spot on the national team. Mohsen was benched the first game of the season and was subbed off for the next 2 matches. On 23 February 2013, a loan offer from Russian Premier League side Amkar Perm. Mohsen said that he felt like he was being "persecuted" at the club lately and he had accepted the offer and was waiting for the clubs approval. After travelling to their winter training camp in Bulgaria for a week-long trial before open talks with club and player, Petrojet and Amkar Perm couldn't agree on a suitable fee for the player and Mohsen didn't leave the club. Mohsen finished the 2012–13 campaign with 2 goals in 10 games. However, Amkar Perm had restarted talks with Petrojet for a loan or permanent transfer move after the end of the season.

=== Gil Vicente ===
On 10 July 2014, Mohsen and fellow Egyptian Hossam Hassan signed for Gil Vicente on a 3-year contract that would keep him at the club until 2017.

=== Ismaily ===
On 15 July 2015, Mohsen signed a 3-year contract with Ismaily Sc as a free transfer after revoking his contract with Gil Vicente. He scored 14 goals and made 10 assists in 32 appearances in the Egyptian Premier League.

=== Al Ahly ===
On 21 July 2016, it was officially announced by Al Ahly that Mohsen signed a 5-year contract.

== International career ==
He was part of Egypt's squad for the 2018 FIFA World Cup in Russia., playing in all three matches as the team were eliminated in the group stage.

== Career statistics ==
=== Club ===
As of match played 31 August 2021

Appearances and goals by club, season and competition
Club	Season	League			Cup		Continental		Other		Total	
Club	Season	Division	Apps	Goals	Apps	Goals	Apps	Goals	Apps	Goals	Apps	Goals
Petrojet	2009–10	Egyptian Premier League	1	0	3	1	—		—		4	1
Petrojet	2010–11	Egyptian Premier League	24	4	2	2	—		—		26	6
Petrojet	2011–12	Egyptian Premier League	11	3	—		—		—		11	3
Petrojet	2012–13	Egyptian Premier League	11	2	2	1	—		—		13	3
Petrojet	2013–14	Egyptian Premier League	15	4	1	0	—		3	1	19	2
Petrojet	Total		62	13	8	3	—		3	1	73	17
Gil Vicente	2014–15	Primeira Liga	20	0	3	2	—		3	0	26	2
Ismaily	2015–16	Egyptian Premier League	32	14	1	0	—		—		33	14
Ismaily	Total		52	14	4	2	—		3	0	59	16
Al Ahly	2016–17	Egyptian Premier League	9	1	0	0	0	0	0	0	9	1
Al Ahly	2017–18	Egyptian Premier League	7	3	2	0	4	1	0	0	13	4
Al Ahly	2018–19	Egyptian Premier League	16	6	0	0	7	2	0	0	23	8
Al Ahly	2019–20	Egyptian Premier League	24	7	5	0	9	2	0	0	38	9
Al Ahly	2020–21	Egyptian Premier League	16	0	1	0	5	1	2	0	24	1
Al Ahly	Total		72	17	3	0	16	4	2	0	107	23

=== International ===
As of match played 14 May 2020

Appearances and goals by national team and year
National team	Year	Apps	Goals
Egypt	2011	2	3
Egypt	2012	3	0
Egypt	2013	2	0
Egypt	2014	0	0
Egypt	2015	0	0
Egypt	2016	5	0
Egypt	2017	5	1
Egypt	2018	12	2
Egypt	2019	6	1
Total		35	7

As of 14 May 2020

Scores and results list Egypt's goal tally first, score column indicates score after each Mohsen goal.

List of international goals scored by Marwan Mohsen
No.	Date	Venue	Opponent	Score	Result	Competition
1.	3 September 2011	National Stadium, Freetown, Sierra Leone	Sierra Leone	1–1	1–2	2012 Africa Cup of Nations qualification
2.	8 October 2011	Cairo International Stadium, Cairo, Egypt	Niger	1–0	3–0	2012 Africa Cup of Nations qualification
3.	8 October 2011	Cairo International Stadium, Cairo, Egypt	Niger	3–0	3–0	2012 Africa Cup of Nations qualification
4.	8 January 2017	Cairo International Stadium, Cairo, Egypt	Tunisia	1–0	1–0	Friendly
5.	8 September 2018	Borg El Arab Stadium, Alexandria, Egypt	Niger	1–0	6–0	2019 Africa Cup of Nations qualification
6.	16 October 2018	Mavuso Sports Centre, Manzini, Swaziland	Eswatini	2–0	2–0	2019 Africa Cup of Nations qualification
7.	16 June 2019	Borg El Arab Stadium, Alexandria, Egypt	Guinea	1–0	3–1	Friendly

== Honours and achievements ==
=== Club ===
Al Ahly

- Egyptian Premier League: 2016–17, 2017–18, 2018–19, 2019-20
- Egypt Cup: 2016–17, 2019–20
- Egyptian Super Cup: 2017, 2018
- CAF Champions League: 2019–20, 2020-21
- CAF Super Cup: 2021
- FIFA Club World Cup: Third-Place 2020 FIFA Club World Cup

Future

- EFA League Cup: 2022

Egypt

- Africa Cup of Nations runner-up: 2017
- Nile Basin Tournament: 2011
