= Ayman Ashraf =

Egyptian footballer (born 1991)

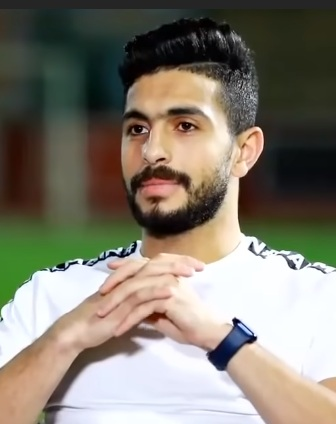
- Ayman Ashraf talks to Al Ahly TV, 7 May 2021

Personal information
- Full name: Ayman Ashraf Elsayed Elsembeskany
- Date of birth: 9 April 1991 (age 35)
- Place of birth: Cairo, Egypt
- Height: 1.82 m (6 ft 0 in)
- Positions: Centre-back; left-back; defensive midfielder

Youth career
- 2005–2009: Al Ahly

Senior career*
Years	Team	Apps	(Gls)
2009–2014	Al Ahly	13	(0)
2012–2013	→ Telephonat Beni Suef (loan)	4	(0)
2013–2014	→ Smouha (loan)	18	(1)
2014–2017	Smouha	70	(2)
2017–2023	Al Ahly	127	(5)
2023–2025	National Bank of Egypt	22	(0)

International career
2009–2011	Egypt U-20	9	(0)
2015–2022	Egypt	33	(2)
- * Club domestic league appearances and goals

Ayman Ashraf Elsayed Elsembeskany (Arabic: أَيْمَن أَشرَف السَّيِّد السَّمبَسكَانِيّ; born 9 April 1991) is an Egyptian retired footballer who played as a centre-back, a left-back or a defensive midfielder.

== International career ==
In May 2018, he was named in Egypt's preliminary squad for the 2018 FIFA World Cup in Russia. He scored his first international goal on 25 May 2018 against Kuwait that ended in a 1–1 draw. He was also named in Egypt's preliminary squad for the 2021 Africa Cup of Nations.

== Personal life ==
On 16 September 2016, he lost his mother and sister in a car accident in Alexandria.

== Career statistics ==
=== International ===
Statistics accurate as of match played 15 June 2018.

Egypt
Year	Apps	Goals
2016	1	0
2017	0	0
2018	6	2
2019	8	0
2020	1	0
Total	16	2

=== International goals ===
Scores and results list Egypt's goal tally first.

#	Date	Venue	Opponent	Score	Result	Competition
1.	25 May 2018	Jaber Al-Ahmad International Stadium, Kuwait City, Kuwait	Kuwait	1–1	1–1	Friendly
2.	8 September 2018	Borg El Arab Stadium, Alexandria, Egypt	Niger	2–0	6–0	2019 Africa Cup of Nations qualification

== Honours and achievements ==
=== Club ===
Al Ahly

- Egyptian Premier League: 2009–10, 2010–11, 2017–18, 2018–19, 2019–20, 2022–23
- Egypt Cup: 2019–20, 2021–22
- Egyptian Super Cup: 2017–18, 2018–19
- CAF Champions League: 2019–20, 2020-21, 2022–23
- CAF Super Cup: 2021 (May), 2021 (December)
- FIFA Club World Cup: Third-Place 2020 FIFA Club World Cup, Third-Place 2021 FIFA Club World Cup
