= Islam Mohareb =

Egyptian footballer (born 1992)

Eslam Mohareb
Personal information
- Date of birth: January 1, 1992 (age 34)
- Place of birth: Cairo, Egypt
- Height: 1.75 m (5 ft 9 in)
- Position: Right winger

Team information
- Current team: Tala'ea El Gaish

Youth career
- 2005–2010: Al Ahly

Senior career*
Years	Team	Apps	(Gls)
2010–2013	Al Ahly	0	(0)
2013–2015	El Gouna	54	(10)
2015–2017	→ Smouha	55	(15)
2017–2019	Al Ahly	33	(13)
2019–2020	El Gouna	23	(0)
2020–2021	Tala'ea El Gaish	23	(4)
2021–2022	El Gouna	31	(0)
2022–	Tala'ea El Gaish	55	(5)

International career
2009–2012	Egypt U20	8	(4)
- * Club domestic league appearances and goals

Eslam Mohareb (Arabic: اسلام محارب) (born January 1, 1992) is an Egyptian professional footballer who plays as a right-winger for Egyptian Premier League club Tala'ea El Gaish.
