= 2011–12 Al Ahly SC season =

2011–12 season
- Chairman: Hassan Hamdy
- Manager: Hossam El-Badry
- Egyptian Premier League: Not completed
- Egypt Cup: Canceled
- Egyptian Super Cup 2011: Winner
- CAF Champions League: Winners
| Home colours | Away colours |

The 2011–12 Al Ahly SC season was the 55th edition in the Egyptian Premier League. Al Ahly were defending champions for an eighth consecutive year.

== Matches ==
=== Egyptian Super Cup 2011 ===
The match was played behind closed doors in Alexandria on 9 September 2012. Al-Ahly were 2–1 victors via a 65th-minute goal from Abdullah-Said and 90+2 minute winner from 'Gedo'.

=== Egyptian Premier League ===
==== Standings ====
| Pos | Team | Pld | W | D | L | GF | GA | GD | Pts |
|---|---|---|---|---|---|---|---|---|---|
| 1 | Haras El Hodoud | 14 | 12 | 1 | 1 | 25 | 9 | +16 | 37 |
| 2 | Al Ahly | 15 | 11 | 3 | 1 | 28 | 12 | +16 | 36 |
| 3 | Zamalek | 14 | 10 | 2 | 2 | 27 | 11 | +16 | 32 |
| 4 | Al Masry | 15 | 7 | 5 | 3 | 17 | 10 | +7 | 26 |
| 5 | Ittihad El Shorta | 15 | 7 | 5 | 3 | 16 | 10 | +6 | 26 |

Updated to match(es) played on 1 February 2012. Source: Egyptian League Standings
Rules for classification: 1) points; 2) goal difference; 3) number of goals scored.
Qualifications/regulations based on rules agreed to preseason; an official decision about whether these rules still apply now that the season has been cancelled has not been made.

==== First round ====
| Game | Date | Tournament | Round | Ground | Opponent | Score^{1} | Report |
|---|---|---|---|---|---|---|---|
| 1 | 14 Oct. 2011 | Egyptian Premier League | 1 | H | Haras El Hodoud | 1–0 | |
| 2 | 18 Oct. 2011 | Egyptian Premier League | 2 | A | Petrojet | 2–2 | |
| 3 | 23 Oct. 2011 | Egyptian Premier League | 3 | H | El Gouna | 1–1 | |
| 4 | 28 Oct. 2011 | Egyptian Premier League | 4 | A | Al Ittihad | 2–0 | |
| 5 | 2 Nov. 2011 | Egyptian Premier League | 5 | H | El Dakhleya | 3–1 | |
| 6 | 7 Nov. 2011 | Egyptian Premier League | 6 | A | ENPPI | 3–2 | |
| 7 | 27 Dec. 2011 | Egyptian Premier League | 10 | H | Ismaily | 1–0 | |
| 8 | 23 Dec. 2011 | Egyptian Premier League | 9 | A | Misr Lel Makkasa | 2–1 | |
| 9 | Postponed | Egyptian Premier League | 10 | H | Wadi Degla | | |
| 10 | 31 Dec. 2011 | Egyptian Premier League | 11 | A | Ghazl El Mahalla | 2–0 | |
| 10 | 5 Jan 2012 | Egyptian Premier League | 12 | H | Tala'ea El Gaish | 3–0 | |
| 11 | 10 Jan. 2012 | Egyptian Premier League | 13 | A | El Entag El Harby | 1–1 | |
| 12 | 14 Jan. 2012 | Egyptian Premier League | 14 | H | Smouha | 3–1 | |
| 14 | 18 Jan. 2012 | Egyptian Premier League | 15 | A | Ittihad El Shorta | 1–0 | |
| 15 | 24 Jan. 2012 | Egyptian Premier League | 16 | H | Al Mokawloon | 2–0 | |
| 16 | 29 Jan. 2012 | Egyptian Premier League | 17 | A | Al Masry | | |

Last updated: 7 Nov. 2011
Source: EFA
^{1}Al-Ahly goals come first.
National flags for Ground and Opponent columns are only shown when different from that of Al-Ahly.
M = Match; Ground: H = Home, A = Away, N = Neutral, HR = Home replacement, AR = Away replacement.

===== Results summary =====
| Overall | | | | | | | | Home | | | | | | Away | | | | | |
| Pld | W | D | L | GF | GA | GD | Pts | W | D | L | GF | GA | GD | W | D | L | GF | GA | GD |
|---|---|---|---|---|---|---|---|---|---|---|---|---|---|---|---|---|---|---|---|
| 10 | 8 | 2 | 0 | 20 | 7 | +13 | 26 | 4 | 1 | 0 | 9 | 2 | +7 | 4 | 1 | 0 | 11 | 5 | +6 |

Last updated: 7 Nov. 2011.
Source: 2011–12 Egyptian Premier League

===== Top goalscorers =====
5 Goals : Emad Moteab

3 Goals : Abdallah Said

2 Goals : Walid Soliman; Hossam Ghaly; Wael Gomaa; Mohamed Nagy "Geddo"; Mohamed Aboutrika

1 Goal : Ahmed Fathi

== Squad ==
=== First team squad ===
Note: Flags indicate national team as defined under FIFA eligibility rules; some limited exceptions apply. Players may hold more than one non-FIFA nationality.

| No. | Pos. | Nation | Player |
|---|---|---|---|
| 1 | GK | EGY | Sherif Ekramy |
| 4 | DF | EGY | Sherif Abdel-Fadil |
| 5 | DF | EGY | Ahmad El-Sayed |
| 6 | DF | EGY | Wael Gomaa (Vice-captain) |
| 7 | FW | EGY | Mohamed Fadl |
| 8 | MF | EGY | Mohamed Barakat |
| 9 | FW | EGY | Emad Moteab |
| 10 | MF | EGY | Moataz Eno |
| 11 | MF | EGY | Walid Soliman |
| 12 | DF | EGY | Ahmad Shedid Qinawi |
| 13 | GK | EGY | Ahmed Adel Abd El-Moneam |
| 14 | MF | EGY | Hossam Ghaly (Captain) |
| 15 | FW | EGY | Mohamed Nagy "Geddo" |
| 16 | GK | EGY | Mahmoud Abou El-Saoud |
| 17 | FW | BRA | Fábio Junior dos Santos |

| No. | Pos. | Nation | Player |
|---|---|---|---|
| 18 | FW | EGY | Al-Sayed Hamdy |
| 19 | FW | EGY | Abdallah Said |
| 20 | MF | EGY | Mohamed Shawky |
| 21 | DF | EGY | Sayed Moawad |
| 22 | MF | EGY | Mohamed Aboutrika |
| 23 | DF | EGY | Mohamed Nagieb |
| 24 | MF | EGY | Ahmed Fathy |
| 25 | MF | EGY | Hossam Ashour |
| 26 | FW | MTN | Dominique Da Silva |
| 30 | MF | EGY | Shehab El-Din Ahmed |
| 34 | DF | EGY | Mohamed Abdel Fattah |
| 37 | MF | EGY | Ramy Rabia |
| 38 | MF | EGY | Amr Warda |
| 39 | DF | EGY | Ayman Ashraf |

=== Youth academy squad ===
Note: Flags indicate national team as defined under FIFA eligibility rules; some limited exceptions apply. Players may hold more than one non-FIFA nationality.

| No. | Pos. | Nation | Player |
|---|---|---|---|
| — | GK | EGY | Mohamed Mokhtar |
| — | DF | EGY | Adel Bekhit |
| — | DF | EGY | Moaz El-Henawy |
| — | DF | EGY | Ahmed Said Mido |
| — | DF | EGY | Saad El-Din Samir |
| — | DF | EGY | Mohamed Abo Saif |
| — | DF | EGY | El-Sayed El-Araby |
| — | DF | EGY | Ayman Ashraf |
| — | DF | EGY | Abdullah Abdul-Azim |
| — | MF | EGY | Shehab El-Din Ahmed |
| — | MF | EGY | Ahmed Mamdouh "Toota" |
| — | MF | EGY | Ahmed Abdel-Aziz |
| — | MF | EGY | Mohamed El-Sayed |
| — | MF | EGY | Reda Shehata |
| — | MF | EGY | Abdel-Rahman Ahmed |
| — | MF | EGY | Ahmed Nasser |
| — | MF | EGY | Salah El-Din Farouq |
| — | MF | EGY | Mahmoud Mohamed |

| No. | Pos. | Nation | Player |
|---|---|---|---|
| — | MF | EGY | Osama Abdel-Mageed |
| — | MF | EGY | Mohamed Gamal |
| — | MF | EGY | Mahmoud Tobah |
| — | MF | EGY | Hesham Mohamed |
| — | MF | EGY | Ahmed Shoukry |
| — | MF | EGY | Mostafa Mahmoud "Afroto" |
| — | FW | EGY | Reda Bakhit |
| — | FW | EGY | Mahran Megahed |
| — | FW | EGY | Marwan Hesham |
| — | FW | EGY | Alaa Shaaban |
| — | FW | EGY | Islam Abdel-Latif |
| — | FW | EGY | Ahmed Mamdouh Mabrouk |
| — | FW | EGY | Mohamed Mostafa Zidan |
| — | FW | EGY | Ahmed Nabil "Manga" |
| — | FW | EGY | Mohamed Talaat |
| — | FW | EGY | Islam Magdy |

== Transfers made in last season ==
Players in / out

=== In ===
| Date | Pos. | Name | From | Fee / Note |
|---|---|---|---|---|
| 12 January 2011 | FW | (Mauritania) Dominique Da Silva | (Tunisia) CS Sfaxien | $0.6m |
| 17 May 2011 | FW | (Egypt) Amr Warda | (Egypt) Sporting | |
| 12 July 2011 | FW | (Egypt) Al-Sayed Hamdy | (Egypt) Petrojet FC | 6.0m EGP |
| 27 July 2011 | MF | (Egypt) Ahmad Shedid Qinawi | (Egypt) Al-Masry | Free agent |
| 29 July 2011 | FW | (Brazil) Fábio Junior dos Santos | (Portugal) Naval | €0.35m |
| 1 August 2011 | DF | (Egypt) Mohamed Nagieb | (Egypt) Al-Shorta | 4.2m EGP |
| 2 August 2011 | DF | (Egypt) Walid Soliman | (Egypt) ENPPI Club | 8.0m EGP |
| 14 September 2011 | FW | (Egypt) Abdallah Said | (Egypt) Ismaily | 7.75m EGP |

=== Out ===
| Date | Pos. | Name | To | Fee / Note |
|---|---|---|---|---|
| | DF | (Egypt) Mohamed Samir | (Egypt) Smouha | Loan |
| | DF | (Egypt) Saad Samir | (Egypt) Al-Masry | Loan |
| | MF | (Egypt) Ahmed Ali | (Egypt) Al-Masry | Loan |
| | MF | (Egypt) Ahmed Shoukry | (Egypt) Telephonat Bani Sweif | Loan |
| | MF | (Egypt) Hussein El-Sayed | (Egypt) Misr El Makasa | Loan |
| 16 June 2009 | MF | (Egypt) Mostafa Afroto | (Egypt) Al-Ittihad | Loan |
| | MF | (Egypt) Hesham Mohamed | (Egypt) Ittihad El-Shorta | Loan |
| | MF | (Algeria) Amir Sayoud | (Egypt) Ismaily | Loan |
| | MF | (Egypt) Ahmed Hassan | (Egypt) Zamalek | Free agent |
| 27 January 2010 | FW | (Egypt) Mohamed Talaat | (Egypt) Al-Ittihad | Loan |
| | FW | (Egypt) Abdul Hameid Shabana | (Egypt) Telephonat Bani Sweif | Loan |

== Coaching staff ==
| Position | Staff |
|---|---|
| Manager | (Portugal) Manuel José |
| Football Director | (Egypt) Sayed Abdel Hafiz |
| Assistant Manager | (Portugal) Pedro Barney |
| Coach | (Egypt) Mohamed Youssef |
| Goalkeeper Coach | (Egypt) Ahmed Nagi |
| Fitness, Strength & Conditioning Coach | (Portugal) Fidalgo Antunes |
| Administrative Director | (Egypt) Ehab Ali |
| Club Doctor | (Egypt) Dr. Adel Abdel Bakki |
| Doctor | (Egypt) Dr. Tarek Abdel-Aziz |
| Dietitian | (Egypt) Dr. Hany Wahba |
| Masseur | (Egypt) Attia Bassiuny |
| Masseur | (Egypt) Sameh Mohamed |
| Masseur | (Egypt) Tarek Hussien |
| Masseur | (Egypt) Ahmed Mahmoud |
