= 2010–11 Al Ahly SC season =

2010–11 season
- Chairman: Hassan Hamdy
- Manager: Manuel José
- Egyptian Premier League: 1st
- Egypt Cup: Round of 16
- Egyptian Super Cup 2010: Champion
- CAF Champions League: Group stage
Home colours	Away colours

The 2010–11 Al-Ahly SC season is the 54th edition in the Egyptian Premier League. Al-Ahly won its seventh consecutive title. The third week of September was one of the most disappointing weeks for Al-Ahly where the club was eliminated from both CAF Champions League and The Egyptian Cup.

== Squad ==
=== First team squad ===
Note: Flags indicate national team as defined under FIFA eligibility rules; some limited exceptions apply. Players may hold more than one non-FIFA nationality.

No.	Pos.	Nation	Player
1	GK	EGY	Sherif Ekramy
4	DF	EGY	Sherif Abdel-Fadil
5	DF	EGY	Ahmad El-Sayed
6	DF	EGY	Wael Gomaa (Vice-captain)
7	FW	EGY	Mohamed Fadl
8	MF	EGY	Mohamed Barakat
9	FW	EGY	Emad Moteab
10	MF	EGY	Moataz Eno
11	MF	EGY	Walid Soliman
12	DF	EGY	Ahmad Shedid Qinawi
13	GK	EGY	Ahmed Adel Abd El-Moneam
14	MF	EGY	Hossam Ghaly (Captain)
15	FW	EGY	Mohamed Nagy "Geddo"
16	GK	EGY	Mahmoud Abou El-Saoud
17	FW	BRA	Fábio Junior dos Santos

No.	Pos.	Nation	Player
18	FW	EGY	Al-Sayed Hamdy
19	FW	EGY	Abdallah Said
20	MF	EGY	Mohamed Shawky
21	DF	EGY	Sayed Moawad
22	MF	EGY	Mohamed Aboutrika
23	DF	EGY	Mohamed Nagieb
24	MF	EGY	Ahmed Fathy
25	MF	EGY	Hossam Ashour
26	FW	MTN	Dominique Da Silva
30	MF	EGY	Shehab El-Din Ahmed
34	DF	EGY	Mohamed Abdel Fattah
37	MF	EGY	Ramy Rabia
38	MF	EGY	Amr Warda
39	DF	EGY	Ayman Ashraf

== Transfers ==
- Players in / out

=== In ===
Date	Pos.	Name	From	Fee / Note
12 January 2011	FW	(Mauritania) Dominique Da Silva	(Tunisia) CS Sfaxien	$ 0.6 m
17 May 2011	FW	(Egypt) Amr Warda	(Egypt) Sporting	
12 July 2011	FW	(Egypt) Al-Sayed Hamdy	(Egypt) Petrojet FC	6.0 m EGP
27 July 2011	MF	(Egypt) Ahmad Shedid Qinawi	(Egypt) Al-Masry	Free agent
29 July 2011	FW	(Brazil) Fábio Junior dos Santos	(Portugal) Naval	€ 0.35 m
1 August 2011	DF	(Egypt) Mohamed Nagieb	(Egypt) Al-Shorta	4.2 m EGP
2 August 2011	DF	(Egypt) Walid Soliman	(Egypt) ENPPI Club	8.0 m EGP
14 September 2011	FW	(Egypt) Abdallah Said	(Egypt) Ismaily	7.75 m EGP

=== Out ===
Date	Pos.	Name	To	Fee / Note
	DF	(Egypt) Mohamed Samir	(Egypt) Smouha	Loan
	DF	(Egypt) Saad Samir	(Egypt) Al-Masry	Loan
	MF	(Egypt) Ahmed Ali	(Egypt) Al-Masry	Loan
	MF	(Egypt) Ahmed Shoukry	(Egypt) Telephonat Bani Sweif	Loan
	MF	(Egypt) Hussein El-Sayed	(Egypt) Misr El Makasa	Loan
16 June 2009	MF	(Egypt) Mostafa Afroto	(Egypt) Al-Ittihad	Loan
	MF	(Egypt) Hesham Mohamed	(Egypt) Ittihad El-Shorta	Loan
	MF	(Algeria) Amir Sayoud	(Egypt) Ismaily	Loan
	MF	(Egypt) Ahmed Hassan	(Egypt) Zamalek	Free agent
27 January 2010	FW	(Egypt) Mohamed Talaat	(Egypt) Al-Ittihad	Loan
	FW	(Egypt) Abdul Hameid Shabana	(Egypt) Telephonat Bani Sweif	Loan

=== Youth academy squad ===
Note: Flags indicate national team as defined under FIFA eligibility rules; some limited exceptions apply. Players may hold more than one non-FIFA nationality.

No.	Pos.	Nation	Player
—	GK	EGY	Mohamed Mokhtar
—	DF	EGY	Adel Bekhit
—	DF	EGY	Moaz El-Henawy
—	DF	EGY	Ahmed Said Mido
—	DF	EGY	Saad El-Din Samir
—	DF	EGY	Mohamed Abo Saif
—	DF	EGY	El-Sayed El-Araby
—	DF	EGY	Ayman Ashraf
—	DF	EGY	Abdullah Abdul-Azim
—	MF	EGY	Shehab El-Din Ahmed
—	MF	EGY	Ahmed Mamdouh "Toota"
—	MF	EGY	Ahmed Abdel-Aziz
—	MF	EGY	Mohamed El-Sayed
—	MF	EGY	Reda Shehata
—	MF	EGY	Abdel-Rahman Ahmed
—	MF	EGY	Ahmed Nasser
—	MF	EGY	Salah El-Din Farouq
—	MF	EGY	Mahmoud Mohamed

No.	Pos.	Nation	Player
—	MF	EGY	Osama Abdel-Mageed
—	MF	EGY	Mohamed Gamal
—	MF	EGY	Mahmoud Tobah
—	MF	EGY	Hesham Mohamed
—	MF	EGY	Ahmed Shoukry
—	MF	EGY	Mostafa Mahmoud "Afroto"
—	FW	EGY	Reda Bakhit
—	FW	EGY	Mahran Megahed
—	FW	EGY	Marwan Hesham
—	FW	EGY	Alaa Shaaban
—	FW	EGY	Islam Abdel-Latif
—	FW	EGY	Ahmed Mamdouh Mabrouk
—	FW	EGY	Mohamed Mostafa Zidan
—	FW	EGY	Ahmed Nabil "Manga"
—	FW	EGY	Mohamed Talaat
—	FW	EGY	Islam Magdy

== Coaching staff ==
Position	Staff
Manager	(Portugal) Manuel José
Football Director	(Egypt) Sayed Abdel Hafiz
Assistant Manager	(Portugal) Pedro Barney
Coach	(Egypt) Mohamed Youssef
Goalkeeper Coach	(Egypt) Ahmed Nagi
Fitness, Strength & Conditioning Coach	(Portugal) Fidalgo Antunes
Administrative Director	(Egypt) Ehab Ali
Club Doctor	(Egypt) Dr. Adel Abdel Bakki
Doctor	(Egypt) Dr. Tarek Abdel-Aziz
Dietitian	(Egypt) Dr. Hany Wahba
Masseur	(Egypt) Attia Bassiuny
Masseur	(Egypt) Sameh Mohamed
Masseur	(Egypt) Tarek Hussien
Masseur	(Egypt) Ahmed Mahmoud

== Matches ==
=== Egyptian Super Cup 2010 ===
As the 2009–10 Egyptian Premier League champions, Al-ahly kicked off the 2009–10 season with the traditional match in the Egyptian Super Cup against 2010 Egypt Cup champion Haras El Hodood on 25 July 2010

Game	Date	Tournament	Round	Ground	Opponent	Score^{1}	Report
1	25 July 2010	Egyptian Super Cup	-	H	Haras El Hodoud	1–0	

Last updated: 30 July 2010
Source: Yallakora
^{1}Al-Ahly goals come first.
National flags for Ground and Opponent columns are only shown when different from that of Al-Ahly.
M = Match; Ground: H = Home, A = Away, N = Neutral, HR = Home replacement, AR = Away replacement.

== Egyptian Premier League ==
=== First round ===
Game	Date	Tournament	Round	Ground	Opponent	Score^{1}	Report
1	6 August 2010	Egyptian Premier League	1	H	Ittihad El Shorta	0–0	
2	20 August 2010	Egyptian Premier League	2	A	Tala'ea El Gaish	1–0	
3	24 August 2010	Egyptian Premier League	3	H	Al Masry	1–1	
4	23 September 2010	Egyptian Premier League	6	H	Wadi Degla	1–0	
5	27 September 2010	Egyptian Premier League	7	A	El Entag El Harby	2–1	
6	27 October 2010	Egyptian Premier League	9	A	Petrojet	1–0	
7	4 November 2010	Egyptian Premier League	10	H	ENPPI	3–2	
8	9 November 2010	Egyptian Premier League	4	A	El Gouna	1–1	
9	21 November 2010	Egyptian Premier League	11	A	Ismaily	1–3	
10	2 December 2010	Egyptian Premier League	13	A	Smouha	1–1	
11	10 December 2010	Egyptian Premier League	5	A	Al Ittihad	2–2	
12	21 December 2010	Egyptian Premier League	8	H	Haras El Hodoud	2–1	
13	25 December 2010	Egyptian Premier League	14	H	Al Mokawloon	1–1	
14	30 December 2010	Egyptian Premier League	12	H	Zamalek	0–0	
15	22 January 2011	Egyptian Premier League	15	A	Misr Lel Makkasa	1–1	

Last updated: 25 January 2011
Source: Yallakora
^{1}Al-Ahly goals come first.
National flags for Ground and Opponent columns are only shown when different from that of Al-Ahly.
M = Match; Ground: H = Home, A = Away, N = Neutral, HR = Home replacement, AR = Away replacement.

==== Results summary ====
Overall								Home						Away					
Pld	W	D	L	GF	GA	GD	Pts	W	D	L	GF	GA	GD	W	D	L	GF	GA	GD
15	7	7	1	17	13	+4	28	3	3	0	7	4	+3	4	4	1	10	9	+1

Last updated: 25 January 2011.
Source: Yallakora

=== Second round ===
Game	Date	Tournament	Round	Ground	Opponent	Score^{1}	Report
1	13 April 2011	Egyptian Premier League	16	A	Ittihad El Shorta	2–1	
2	17 April 2011	Egyptian Premier League	17	H	Tala'ea El Gaish	1–0	
3	29 April 2011	Egyptian Premier League	18	A	Al Masry	0–0	
4	3 May 2011	Egyptian Premier League	19	H	El Gouna	1–0	
5	12 May 2011	Egyptian Premier League	20	H	Al Ittihad	1–0	
6	16 May 2011	Egyptian Premier League	21	A	Wadi Degla	2–1	
7	3 May 2011	Egyptian Premier League	22	H	El Entag El Harby	2–2	
8	25 May 2011	Egyptian Premier League	23	H	Haras El Hodoud	3–0	
9	10 June 2011	Egyptian Premier League	24	H	Petrojet	2–0	
10	21 June 2011	Egyptian Premier League	25	A	ENPPI	2–0	
11	25 June 2011	Egyptian Premier League	26	H	Ismaily	2–1	
12	29 June 2011	Egyptian Premier League	27	A	Zamalek	2–2	
13	3 July 2011	Egyptian Premier League	28	H	Smouha	2–2	
14	7 July 2011	Egyptian Premier League	29	H	Al Mokawloon	5–1	
15	10 July 2011	Egyptian Premier League	30	H	Misr Lel Makkasa	2–2	

Last updated: 12 July 2011
^{1}Al-Ahly goals come first.
National flags for Ground and Opponent columns are only shown when different from that of Al-Ahly.
M = Match; Ground: H = Home, A = Away, N = Neutral, HR = Home replacement, AR = Away replacement.

==== Results summary ====
Overall								Home						Away					
Pld	W	D	L	GF	GA	GD	Pts	W	D	L	GF	GA	GD	W	D	L	GF	GA	GD
15	10	5	0	29	12	+17	35	5	3	0	13	5	+8	5	2	0	16	7	+9

Last updated: 12 July 2011.

== 2011 CAF Champions League ==
=== Group B ===
Pos	Team	Pld	W	D	L	GF	GA	GD	Pts	Qualification
1	(Tunisia) Espérance ST	6	2	4	0	9	4	+5	10	Advance to knockout stage
2	(Morocco) Wydad AC	6	1	4	1	11	9	+2	7 (Note: Wydad AC and Al-Ahly are ranked by their head-to-head records (decided by away goals).)	Advance to knockout stage
3	(Egypt) Al-Ahly	6	1	4	1	7	6	+1	7	
4	(Algeria) MC Alger	6	1	2	3	4	12	−8	5	

Source: CAF
Notes:
16 July 2011
18:30 UTC+01:00

MC Alger (Algeria)	1 – 1	(Tunisia) Espérance ST
Mohamed Megherbi 17'	Report	Oussama Darragi 7'

Stade 5 Juillet 1962, Algiers
Referee: Daniel Bennett (South Africa)
17 July 2011
21:00 UTC+02:00

Al-Ahly (Egypt)	3 – 3	(Morocco) Wydad Casablanca
Emad Moteab 2'; Wael Gomaa 21'; Dominique Da Silva 75'	Report	Sherif Abdel-Fadil 1' (o.g.); Mouhcine Iajour 66', 88'

Cairo Military Academy Stadium, Cairo
Referee: Gassama Bakary (Gambia)

30 July 2011
19:00 UTC+01:00

Wydad Casablanca (Morocco)	4 – 0	(Algeria) MC Alger
Fabrice N'Guessi 1'; Ahmed Ajeddou 30' (pen.); Ayoub El Khaliki 74'; Jean Louis Pascal Angan 90'	Report

Stade Mohamed V, Casablanca
Attendance: 50,000
30 July 2011
21:30 UTC+01:00

Espérance ST (Tunisia)	1 – 0	(Egypt) Al-Ahly
Yannick N'Djeng 14'	Report

Olympic Stadium, Radès

12 August 2011
22:00 UTC+02:00

Al-Ahly (Egypt)	2 – 0	(Algeria) MC Alger
Emad Moteab 10', 31'	Report

Cairo International Stadium, Cairo
14 August 2011
22:00 UTC±00:00

Wydad Casablanca (Morocco)	2 – 2	(Tunisia) Espérance ST
Fabrice N'Guessi 65'; Youssef Kaddioui 78' (pen.)	Report	Wajdi Bouazzi 22'; Walid Hichri 37'

Stade Mohamed V, Casablanca
Attendance: 67,000

27 August 2011
22:00 UTC+01:00

Espérance ST (Tunisia)	0 – 0	(Morocco) Wydad Casablanca
	Report

Stade El Menzah, Tunis
28 August 2011
22:00 UTC+01:00

MC Alger (Algeria)	0 – 0	(Egypt) Al-Ahly
	Report

Stade 5 Juillet 1962, Algiers

10 September 2011
19:10 UTC+01:00

Espérance ST (Tunisia)	4 – 0	(Algeria) MC Alger
Mejdi Traoui 8'; Yannick N'Djeng 21', 43', 55'	Report

Stade El Menzah, Tunis
11 September 2011
19:30 UTC±00:00

Wydad Casablanca (Morocco)	1 – 1	(Egypt) Al-Ahly
Abderahim Benkhajjan 48'	Report	Mohamed Nagy 36'

Stade Mohamed V, Casablanca

16 September 2011
19:00 UTC+01:00

MC Alger (Algeria)	3 – 1	(Morocco) Wydad Casablanca
Réda Babouche 32', 36'; Hervé Oussalé 61'	Report	Ahmed Ajeddou 79' (pen.)

Stade 5 Juillet 1962, Algiers
16 September 2011
20:00 UTC+02:00

Al-Ahly (Egypt)	1 – 1	(Tunisia) Espérance ST
Mohamed Aboutrika 54'	Report	Banana Yaya 17'

Cairo International Stadium, Cairo

== Egypt Cup ==
=== First round ===
5 September 2011
18:00 GMT

Al-Ahly	4 – 0	KIMA Aswan SC
W.Soliman 9'; Shehab 42'; M.Nagieb 72'; A.Hamdy 76'

Cairo International Stadium, Cairo

=== Round of 16 ===
21 September 2011
18:30 GMT

Al-Ahly	0 – 1	ENPPI
Gomaa (yellow card)		Sakka (yellow card); Rabia 67' (o.g.)

Cairo International Stadium, Cairo
Attendance: ~20,000
Referee: Mohammed Farouk
