= 2011–12 Egyptian Premier League =

Egyptian Premier League
- Season: 2011–12
- Matches: 78
- Goals: 191 (2.45 per match)
- Average goals/game: 2.448
- Top goalscorer: Hosny Abd Rabo (7 goals)
- Biggest home win: Zamalek 6–1 Ghazl El Mahalla
- Biggest away win: Ghazl El Mahalla 0–3 Al Masry; Ghazl El Mahalla 0–3 Telephonat Bani Sweif
- Highest scoring: Zamalek 6–1 Ghazl El Mahalla; Misr El Makasa 5–2 Al Ittihad Al Sakandary
- Longest winning run: 7 games Haras El Hodood
- Longest unbeaten run: 9 games El Gouna
- Longest winless run: 8 games Al Mokawloon Al Arab; El Dakhleya; Ghazl El Mahalla; Smouha
- Longest losing run: 4 games Al Mokawloon Al Arab; El Dakhleya; Ghazl El Mahalla

The 2011–12 Egyptian Premier League was the fifty-fifth season of the Egyptian Premier League since its establishment in 1948. The season began on 14 October 2011, with a total of 19 teams contesting the league. Al Ahly won the last seven league titles.

This season, the league increased from 16 to 19 teams due to no relegation in the 2010–11 season as a result of the 2011 Egyptian revolution. Three teams were promoted from the second division.

Following the Port Said Stadium disaster on 1 February 2012, the season was suspended. At that time, teams had played between 14 and 17 games out of 30. Haras El-Hodood was in first place with a 12–1–1 record. This result was considered a significant surprise by Al Ahram. On 10 March 2012, a decision was reached to cancel the remainder of the season.

== Teams ==
Al Ittihad Al Sakandary, Smouha and Al Mokawloon Al Arab were the worst three teams in 2010–11 but were not relegated to the 2011–12 Egyptian Second Division. Three teams were promoted from the 2010–11 Egyptian Second Division – El Dakhleya, Ghazl El Mahalla, and Telephonat Bani Sweif – bringing the league up to 19 teams total.

=== Stadiums and locations ===
}

Club	Location	Venue	Capacity
Al Ahly	Cairo	Cairo International Stadium	74,100
Al Ittihad Al Sakandary	Alexandria	Alexandria Stadium	13,660
Al Masry	Port Said	Port Said Stadium	17,988
Al Mokawloon Al Arab	Cairo	Osman Ahmed Osman Stadium	35,000
El Dakhleya	Cairo	El Sekka El Hadeed Stadium	20,000
El Entag El Harby	Cairo	Al-Salam Stadium	30,000
El Gouna	Hurghada	El Gouna Stadium	30,000
Enppi	Cairo	Petro Sport Stadium	25,000
Ghazl El Mahalla	El Mahalla El Kubra	El Mahalla Stadium	29,000
Haras El Hodood	Alexandria	Haras El Hedood Stadium	22,000
Ismaily	Ismailia	Ismailia Stadium	18,525
Ittihad El Shorta	Cairo	Police Academy Stadium	22,000
Misr El Makasa	Fayoum	Fayoum Stadium	10,000
Petrojet	Suez	Suez Stadium	25,000
Smouha	Alexandria	Alexandria Stadium	13,660
Tala'ea El Gaish	Cairo	Gehaz El Reyada Stadium	22,000
Telephonat Bani Sweif	Bani Sweif	Bani Sweif Stadium	10,000
Wadi Degla	Cairo	Cairo Military Academy Stadium	22,000
Zamalek	Giza	Cairo International Stadium	74,100

=== Personnel and kits ===
Team	Chairman	Manager	Captain	Kit manufacturer	Shirt sponsor
Al Ahly	(Egypt) Hassan Hamdy	(Egypt) Hossam El Badry	(Egypt) Hossam Ghaly	Adidas	Etisalat
Al Ittihad Al Sakandary	(Egypt) Effat El Sadat	(Spain) José Maceda	(Egypt) Ibrahim El Shayeb	Diadora	McDonald's
Al Masry	(Egypt) Kamel Abou Aly	(Egypt) Talaat Youssef	(Egypt) Ahmed Fawzi	Umbro	MTS Egypt
Al Mokawloon Al Arab	(Egypt) Ibrahim Mahlab	(Egypt) Mohammed Radwan	(Egypt) Mohammed El Akabawy	Diadora	McDonald's
El Dakhleya	(Egypt) Magdy Altohamy	(Egypt) Alaa Abdelaal	(Egypt) Mostafa Nasr	Diadora	McDonald's
El Entag El Harby	(Egypt) Abdelmonem Hassan	(Egypt) Osama Orabi	(Egypt) Hazem Fathi	Diadora	McDonald's
El Gouna	(Egypt) Samih Sawiris	(Egypt) Anwar Salama	(Egypt) Nour El-Sayed	Umbro	Mobinil
Enppi	(Egypt) Maged Nagaty	(Egypt) Mokhtar Mokhtar	(Egypt) Adel Moustafa	Nike	McDonald's
Ghazl El Mahalla	(Egypt) Ahmed Maher	(Egypt) Salah El Nahi	(Egypt) Ibrahim Farag	Diadora	McDonald's
Haras El Hodood	(Egypt) Abdel Rehim Mohamed	(Egypt) Tarek El Ashry	(Egypt) Mohamed Halim	Diadora	McDonald's
Ismaily	(Egypt) Yehia Al-Komi	(Egypt) Mahmoud Gaber	(Egypt) Mohamed Homos	BURRDA	
Ittihad El Shorta	(Egypt) Mahmoud Sharaf	(Egypt) Helmy Toulan	(Egypt) Mohamad Hanafy	Nike	McDonald's
Misr El Makasa	(Egypt) Mohammed Abdelsalam	(Egypt) Tarek Yehia	(Egypt) Hassan Kondi	Legea	McDonald's
Petrojet	(Egypt) Mohamed Abdul Hafez	(Egypt) Taha Basry	(Egypt) Amr Hassan	Umbro	McDonald's
Smouha	(Egypt) Mohammad Farag Amer	(Egypt) Shawky Gharib	(Egypt) Ahmed Hamodi	Diadora	McDonald's
Tala'ea El Gaish	(Egypt) Mostafa Kamel	(Egypt) Farouk Gaafar	(Ghana) Ernest Papa Arko	Diadora	McDonald's
Telephonat Bani Sweif	(Egypt) Mohamed Abdul Rahim	(Egypt) Hamza El-Gamal	(Egypt) Saber Hussein	Diadora	McDonald's
Wadi Degla	(Egypt) Maged Samy	(Belgium) Walter Meeuws	(Egypt) Mohamed Kawarshy	Jako	WADI DEGLA
Zamalek	(Egypt) Mamdouh Abbas	(Egypt) Hassan Shehata	(Egypt) Abdelwahed El-Sayed	Adidas	York ACs

== League table ==
Pos	Team	Pld	W	D	L	GF	GA	GD	Pts
1	Haras El Hodoud	14	12	1	1	25	9	+16	37
2	Al Ahly	15	11	3	1	28	12	+16	36
3	Zamalek	14	10	2	2	27	11	+16	32
4	Al Masry	15	7	5	3	17	10	+7	26
5	Ittihad El Shorta	15	7	5	3	16	10	+6	26
6	Ismaily	14	7	4	3	17	13	+4	25
7	Misr El Makasa	15	6	6	3	29	19	+10	24
8	Enppi	16	7	3	6	28	25	+3	24
9	El Gouna	16	5	7	4	22	18	+4	22
10	Wadi Degla	14	4	7	3	17	15	+2	19
11	Telephonat Bani Sweif	16	6	1	9	16	21	−5	19
12	Tala'ea El Gaish	16	3	8	5	19	21	−2	17
13	Al Ittihad Al Sakandary	16	3	6	7	14	21	−7	15
14	Smouha	15	3	4	8	15	23	−8	13
15	Petrojet	14	1	8	5	12	21	−9	11
16	Ghazl El Mahalla	14	2	5	7	11	29	−18	11
17	Al Mokawloon Al Arab	15	2	4	9	17	24	−7	10
18	El Entag El Harby	17	1	6	10	8	26	−18	9
19	El Dakhleya	15	1	5	9	12	22	−10	8

Updated to match(es) played on 1 February 2012. Source: Egyptian League Standings
Rules for classification: 1) points; 2) goal difference; 3) number of goals scored.
Qualifications/regulations based on rules agreed to preseason; an official decision about whether these rules still apply now that the season has been cancelled has not been made.

== Results ==
Home \ Away	AHL	ITH	MAS	MOK	DKH	ENT	GOU	ENP	GMH	HRS	ISM	ITS	MMK	PET	SMO	TGS	TBS	WDG	ZAM
Al Ahly	—			2–0	3–1		1–1			1–0	1–0				3–1	3–0			a
Al Ittihad	0–2	—						3–0		0–1					3–3	1–0		0–0	0–2
Al Masry	3–1	2–0	—	1–0				1–0							1–1	1–1	1–0		
Al Mokawloon	0–2			—	4–1	0–0	4–1			2–3	0–1	2–2							1–3
El Dakhleya		1–1	2–0		—	0–0			1–1		1–2		0–1				0–1		
El Entag El Harby	1–1	0–0	1–1			—		0–2				1–2		0–0		1–2	1–0	2–3	
El Gouna						3–0	—		2–2		4–1	0–0	1–1	3–1			2–1		
ENPPI	2–3			3–0	3–2		3–3	—								2–2		3–3	2–1
Ghazl El Mahalla	0–2	0–0	0–3			2–0		2–1	—					2–2			0–3	0–0	
Haras El Hodoud			2–1			3–0	1–0		1–0	—		2–0	1–1						
Ismaily		1–1	0–0					2–1			—	1–1	0–0	3–1					
Ittihad El Shorta	0–1	1–0	0–0					0–1				—		2–0	2–0		2–0		
Misr Lel Makkasa	1–2	5–2				2–0		2–1	5–1			1–1	—	2–3			3–0		
Petrojet	2–2			1–1						0–3				—	0–0	1–1		0–1	
Smouha				1–1	2–1		0–1			1–2	2–1		3–1		—				0–1
Tala'ea El Gaish				2–1	1–1		1–1		3–0	0–1	1–2		1–1			—			1–1
Telephonat Beni Suef		2–1		1–0				1–2						0–0	2–1	2–1	—	1–2	0–2
Wadi Degla					0–0		0–0			1–2	0–1		3–3		2–0	2–2		—	
Zamalek	a		2–1		2–1	3–1	1–0		6–1			1–2							—

Updated to match(es) played on 1 February 2012. Source: Egyptian League
Legend: Blue = home team win; Yellow = draw; Red = away team win.

== Season statistics ==
=== Top goalscorers ===
Rank	Player	Club	Goals
1	(Egypt) Hosni Abd Rabo	Ismaily	7
2	(Egypt) Ahmed Hassan	Zamalek	6
2	(Nigeria) Minusu Buba	El Gouna	6
2	(Ivory Coast) Oussou Konan	Misr El Makasa	6
5	(Egypt) Ahmed Hassan Mekky	Haras El Hodood	5
5	(Egypt) Emad Moteb	Al Ahly	5
5	(Egypt) Khaled Kamar	El-Shorta	5
8	(Burkina Faso) Abdoulaye Cissé	Al Masry	4
8	(Egypt) Ahmed Abd El-Zaher	Enppi	4
8	(Ghana) Ernest Papa Arko	Tala'ea El Gaish	4
8	(Egypt) Fouad Salama	Misr El Makasa	4
8	(Burkina Faso) Mohamed Koffi	Petrojet	4
8	(Egypt) Salah Ashour	El-Shorta	4

3 goals ( 6 players )

- (Egypt) Ahmed Shoukry (Telephonat Bani Sweif)
- (Egypt) Amr Zaki (Zamalek)
- (Egypt) Ashour El Takky (Wadi Degla)
- (Egypt) Hamada Yehia (El Dakhleya)
- (Egypt) Mostafa Mhana (Telephonat Bani Sweif)
- (Ghana) Samuel Owusu (Ghazl El Mahalla)

2 goals ( 17 players )

- (Egypt) Adel Mostafa (Enppi)
- (Egypt) Ahmed Eid (Haras El Hodood)
- (Egypt) Ahmed Raouf (Enppi)
- (Egypt) Ayman Abdelaziz (Misr El Makasa)
- (Egypt) Hossam Ghaly (Al Ahly)
- (Cameroon) Marc Mboua (Smouha)
- (Egypt) Marwan Mohsen (Petrojet)
- (Egypt) Mohamed Abd Rabo Felix (El Entag El Harby)
- (Egypt) Mohamed Abdullah (Ghazl El Mahalla)
- (Egypt) Mohamed El Morsy (Al Ittihad Al Sakandary)
- (Egypt) Mohamed Salah (Al Mokawloon Al Arab)
- (Egypt) Mohamed Shaarawy (Haras El Hodood)
- (Egypt) Salah Amin (Tala'ea El Gaish)
- (Egypt) Sameh Aidrous (Misr El Makasa)
- (Ghana) Samuel Kyere (Al Ittihad Al Sakandary)
- (Ivory Coast) Vincent Die Foneye (Enppi)
- (Egypt) Walid Soliman (Al Ahly)

1 goal ( 72 players )

- (Egypt) Abd Al Aziz Mousa (El Dakhleya)
- (Egypt) Abdallah El Said (Al Ahly)
- (Ivory Coast) Abou Kone (Tala'ea El Gaish)
- (Egypt) Ahmed Abdel-Ghani (Haras El Hodood)
- (Egypt) Ahmed Adel (El Gouna)
- (Egypt) Ahmed Ali (Ismaily)
- (Egypt) Ahmed Gaafar (Zamalek)
- (Egypt) Ahmed Hassan Farag (El Gouna)
- (Egypt) Ahmed Magdy (Ghazl El Mahalla)
- (Egypt) Ahmed Moksha (Haras El Hodood)
- (Egypt) Ahmed Osman (El Gouna)
- (Egypt) Ahmed Said Ouka (Haras El Hodood)
- (Egypt) Ahmed Salama (Haras El Hodood)
- (Egypt) Ahmed Salem Safi (Haras El Hodood)
- (Egypt) Ahmed Samir (Zamalek)
- (Egypt) Ahmed Samir Farag (Ismaily)
- (Egypt) Ahmed Shroyda (Al Masry)
- (Egypt) Ahmed Sobhi (Enppi)
- (Egypt) Ahmed Zahran (Al Masry)
- (Egypt) Alaa Kamal (Al Mokawloon Al Arab)
- (Egypt) Ali Fathy (Al Mokawloon Al Arab)
- (Egypt) Amer Sabry (Tala'ea El Gaish)
- (Egypt) Ashour El Adham (El Gouna)
- (Ivory Coast) Bamba Assmanou Drissa (Telephonat Bani Sweif)
- (Egypt) Basem Ali (Al Mokawloon Al Arab)
- (Egypt) Emad El Nemr (El Entag El Harby)
- (Egypt) Essam Abdel Aaty (Al Masry)
- (Ivory Coast) Falie Arman (El Dakhleya)
- (Ghana) Francis Boateng (Al Ittihad Al Sakandary)
- (Egypt) Gedo (Al Ahly)
- (Ghana) Godwin Attram (Smouha)
- (Egypt) Hassan Gomaa (El Gouna)
- (Egypt) Hassan Mostafa (Wadi Degla)
- (Egypt) Hassan Mousa (Telephonat Bani Sweif)
- (Egypt) Hussein Hamdy (Zamalek)
- (Egypt) Ibrahim Al Hilali (El Gouna)
- (Egypt) Kamal Ali (Petrojet)
- (Guinea) Lama Koné (El Dakhleya)
- (Burkina Faso) Maarouf Youssef (El-Shorta)
- (Egypt) Mahmoud Fathallah (Zamalek)
- (Egypt) Mahmoud Samna (Petrojet)
- (Egypt) Mahmoud Samir (Al Ittihad Al Sakandary)
- (Egypt) Mahmoud Tobah (Al Masry)
- (Mozambique) Mano (Enppi)
- (Egypt) Medhat Ramadan (El Entag El Harby)
- (Egypt) Mido (Zamalek)
- (Egypt) Mohamed Aboutrika (Al Ahly)
- (Egypt) Mohamed Al Fayomi (El-Shorta)
- (Egypt) Mohamed El Hosary (Wadi Degla)
- (Egypt) Mohamed Halim (Haras El Hodood)
- (Egypt) Mohamed Ibrahim (Misr El Makasa)
- (Egypt) Mohamed Shaaban (Enppi)
- (Egypt) Mostafa Afroto (Al Ittihad Al Sakandary)
- (Egypt) Mostafa Hegab (Ghazl El Mahalla)
- (Egypt) Mostafa Shebeita (Wadi Degla)
- (Nigeria) Musa Kabiru (Al Mokawloon Al Arab)
- (Burkina Faso) Nouhan Tayam (Ghazl El Mahalla)
- (Egypt) Omar Gamal (Ismaily)
- (Morocco) Omar Najdi (Misr El Makasa)
- (Egypt) Ramy Rabie (Al Ittihad Al Sakandary)
- (Egypt) Ramy Sabry (Enppi)
- (Egypt) Said Kamal (El-Shorta)
- (Ghana) Samuel Afoum (Smouha)
- (Ghana) Samuel Ocran (El Gouna)
- (Egypt) Shady Mohamed (Telephonat Bani Sweif)
- (Nigeria) Shams Aldeen Tigany (Al Mokawloon Al Arab)
- (Egypt) Sherif Ashraf (El Gouna)
- (Egypt) Shikabala (Zamalek)
- (Egypt) Talaat Moharem (Petrojet)
- (Egypt) Wael Gomaa (Al Ahly)
- (Egypt) Walid El Hosary (El Dakhleya)
- (Egypt) Walid Mohamed Abdel Monaem (El Gouna)

=== Own goals ===
Player	Club	Scored For	Result	Own Goals	Date
(Egypt) Moatasem Salem	Ismaily	El Gouna	1–4	1	19 October 2011
(Egypt) Ahmed Said Ouka	Haras El Hodood	Wadi Degla	2–1	1	23 October 2011
(Egypt) Mohamed Ibrahim	Misr El Makasa	Al Ahly	1–2	1	23 December 2011

=== Hat-tricks ===
Player	For	Against	Result	Date
(Ivory Coast) Oussou Konan	Misr El Makasa	Al Ittihad Al Sakandary	5–2	3 November 2011

=== Scoring ===
- First goal of the season: Hosni Abd Rabo for Ismaily against Petrojet (14 October 2011)
- Fastest goal of the season: 38 seconds – Ashour El Takky for Wadi Degla against Telephonat Bani Sweif (19 October 2011)
- Widest winning margin: 5 goals
  - Zamalek 6–1 Ghazl El Mahalla (19 October 2011)
- Highest scoring game: 7 goals
  - Zamalek 6–1 Ghazl El Mahalla (19 October 2011)
  - Misr El Makasa 5–2 Al Ittihad Al Sakandary (3 November 2011)
- Most goals scored in a match by a single team: 6 goals
  - Zamalek 6–1 Ghazl El Mahalla (19 October 2011)
- Most goals scored in a match by a losing team: 2 goals
  - Misr El Makasa 2–3 Petrojet (23 October 2011)
  - Enppi 3–2 El Dakhleya (24 October 2011)
  - Misr El Makasa 5–2 Al Ittihad Al Sakandary (3 November 2011)
  - Enppi 2–3 Al Ahly (7 November 2011)
  - Al Mokawloon Al Arab 2–3 Haras El Hodood (22 December 2011)
- Most goals scored in a match by a single player: 3 goals
  - Oussou Konan for Misr El Makasa against Al Ittihad Al Sakandary (3 November 2011)

=== Clean sheets ===
- Most clean sheets: 5
  - Al Ittihad Al Sakandary
- Fewest clean sheets: 0
  - Enppi
  - Tala'ea El Gaish

== Cancellation ==
On 10 March 2012, a decision was reached to cancel the remainder of the season. A spokesperson for the Egyptian Football Association said the decision was made because there was insufficient time to play the remaining games before the national team was scheduled to compete in the 2012 Olympics and qualifiers for the 2013 Africa Cup of Nations. Farouk Ga’afar, coach of El-Gaish strongly criticized the decision saying the decision would cost the country a lot of money and that "people sitting in coffee shops could make a better decision." It was the fifth time that Egypt has cancelled a season of football; previously 1954–55, 1970–71, 1973–74, and 1989–90 were cancelled for a variety of reasons.

At the same time, it was announced that 18 teams would compete in a friendly tournament "Martyrs Cup" to raise money for families of those killed in Port Said incident. Al Masry, the home team whose fans rioted in Port Said, leaving 72 people dead and 150 injured, was barred from the tournament. Al Ahly, the visiting team during the attack, has been invited but has not confirmed whether they will participate or not. The tournament is scheduled to commence on 29 March with round robin play. The league will be divided into two groups, and the games will take place in empty stadiums owned by the Egyptian Army. The top two teams from each group will advance to the semi-finals for a single elimination event. The final is scheduled for 18 May. The Egypt Cup is expected to take place as normal, with Al Masry barred from competition.

Under normal circumstances, the league's top two teams get to participate in the African Champions League. It was not immediately clear if league leaders El-Hodood and Al-Ahly would be declared as the league's top two teams and invited to participate in the Champions League. "I am not against the league cancellation but I want to know: Will we be considered as the league champions?" asked El-Hodoud coach Tarek El-Ashry. In the end, Al-Ahly and Zamalek, who were the 2010-11 League Champions and runners-up, were selected to represent Egypt. Al-Ahly went on to win the tournament.
