= 2009 FIFA U-20 World Cup =

FIFA U-20 World Cup Egypt 2009 كأس العالم للشباب تحت 20 سنة 2009
- 2009 FIFA U-20 World Cup official logo

Tournament details
- Host country: Egypt
- Dates: 24 September – 16 October
- Teams: 24 (from 6 confederations)
- Venues: 7 (in 5 host cities)

Final positions
- Champions: Ghana (1st title)
- Runners-up: Brazil
- Third place: Hungary
- Fourth place: Costa Rica

Tournament statistics
- Matches played: 52
- Goals scored: 167 (3.21 per match)
- Attendance: 1,292,720 (24,860 per match)
- Top scorer(s): (Ghana) Dominic Adiyiah (8 goals)
- Best player: (Ghana) Dominic Adiyiah
- Best goalkeeper: (Costa Rica) Esteban Alvarado
- Fair play award: Brazil

The 2009 FIFA U-20 World Cup was the 17th edition of the FIFA U-20 World Cup, which was hosted by Egypt from 24 September to 16 October 2009. The tournament was initially going to take place between 10 and 31 July. However, the 2009 FIFA Confederations Cup was played mid-year, resulting in both that year's U-20 and U-17 World Cups being played at the end of the year. The tournament was won by Ghana after they defeated Brazil on penalties in the final, becoming the first African team to win the tournament.

== Player eligibility ==
Only players born on or after 1 January 1989 were eligible to compete.

== Venues ==
Cairo		Alexandria	
Cairo International Stadium; Capacity: 75,000	Al Salam Stadium; Capacity: 30,000	Borg El Arab Stadium; Capacity: 86,000	
30°04′09″N 31°18′44″E	30°10′28″N 31°26′06″E	30°59′58″N 29°43′46″E	
2009 FIFA U-20 World Cup is located in Egypt
Alexandria	Suez	Port Said	Ismailia
Alexandria Stadium; Capacity: 13,660	Mubarak International Stadium; Capacity: 45,000	Port Said Stadium; Capacity: 17,988	Ismailia Stadium; Capacity: 18,525
31°11′50″N 29°54′48″E	29°57′45″N 32°34′07″E	31°16′17″N 32°17′29″E	30°36′04″N 32°16′26″E

== Qualification ==
Twenty-three teams qualified for the 2009 FIFA U-20 World Cup. As the host team, Egypt received automatic entry to the cup, bringing the total number of teams to twenty-four for the tournament.

Confederation	Qualifying tournament	Qualifier(s)
AFC (Asia)	2008 AFC U-19 Championship	Australia; South Korea; United Arab Emirates; Uzbekistan
CAF (Africa)	Host nation	Egypt
CAF (Africa)	2009 African Youth Championship	Cameroon; Ghana; Nigeria; South Africa
CONCACAF (North, Central America & Caribbean)	2009 CONCACAF U-20 Championship	Costa Rica; Honduras; Trinidad and Tobago; United States
CONMEBOL (South America)	2009 South American U-20 Championship	Brazil; Paraguay; Uruguay; Venezuela^{1}
OFC (Oceania)	2008 OFC U-20 Championship	Tahiti^{1}
UEFA (Europe)	2008 UEFA European Under-19 Championship	Czech Republic; England; Germany; Hungary; Italy; Spain

1.Teams that made their debut.

== Match officials ==
Confederation	Referee	Assistants
AFC	Yuichi Nishimura (Japan)	Toru Sagara (Japan); Jeong Hae-Sang (South Korea)
AFC	Subkhiddin Salleh (Malaysia)	Mu Yuxin (China); Thanom Borikut (Thailand)
CAF	Mohamed Benouza (Algeria)	Nasser Abdel Nabi (Egypt); Angesom Ogbamariam (Eritrea)
CAF	Coffi Codjia (Benin)	Alexis Fassinau (Benin); Desire Gahungu (Burundi)
CAF	Koman Coulibaly (Mali)	Ayuba Haruna (Ghana); Redouane Achik (Morocco)
CAF	Eddy Maillet (Seychelles)	Bechir Hassani (Tunisia); Evarist Menkouande (Cameroon)
CONCACAF	Joel Aguilar (El Salvador)	William Torres (El Salvador); Juan Zumba (El Salvador)
CONCACAF	Marco Rodríguez (Mexico)	José Luis Camargo (Mexico); Alberto Morín (Mexico)
CONMEBOL	Héctor Baldassi (Argentina)	Ricardo Casas (Argentina); Hernán Maidana (Argentina)
CONMEBOL	Óscar Ruiz (Colombia)	Abraham González (Colombia); Humberto Clavijo (Colombia)
CONMEBOL	Jorge Larrionda (Uruguay)	Pablo Fandiño (Uruguay); Mauricio Espinosa (Uruguay)
OFC	Peter O'Leary (New Zealand)	Brent Best (New Zealand); Matthew Taro (Solomon Islands)
UEFA	Thomas Einwaller (Austria)	Roland Heim (Austria); Norbert Schwab (Austria)
UEFA	Frank De Bleeckere (Belgium)	Peter Hermans (Belgium); Walter Vromans (Belgium)
UEFA	Ivan Bebek (Croatia)	Tomislav Petrović (Croatia); Tomislav Setka (Croatia)
UEFA	Roberto Rosetti (Italy)	Paolo Calcagno (Italy); Stefano Ayroldi (Italy)
UEFA	Olegário Benquerença (Portugal)	José Cardinal (Portugal); Bertino Miranda (Portugal)
UEFA	Alberto Undiano Mallenco (Spain)	Fermín Martínez Ibánez (Spain); Juan Carlos Yuste Jiménez (Spain)

== Allocation of teams to groups ==
Teams were allocated to groups on the basis of geographical spread. Teams were placed in four pots, and one team was drawn from each pot for each group. Pot 1 contained the five African teams plus one from CONMEBOL; Pot 2 contained the remaining teams from the Americas excluding one CONCACAF team; Pot 3 consisted of teams from Asia and Oceania plus the remaining CONCACAF team; Pot 4 consisted of teams from the European confederation.

Pot 1	Pot 2	Pot 3	Pot 4
Egypt (seeded); Ghana; Cameroon; Nigeria; South Africa; Brazil (seeded)	Paraguay; Uruguay; Venezuela; Costa Rica; United States; Honduras	United Arab Emirates; South Korea; Uzbekistan; Australia; Trinidad and Tobago; Tahiti	Germany (seeded); Italy; Czech Republic; Hungary; Spain; England

== Group stage ==
The draw for the group stages was held on 5 April 2009 at Luxor Temple. Each group winner and runner-up teams, as well as the best four third-placed teams, qualified for the first round of the knockout stage (round of 16).

=== Group A ===
Pos	Team	Pld	W	D	L	GF	GA	GD	Pts	Group stage result
1	Egypt (H)	3	2	0	1	9	5	+4	6	Advance to knockout stage
2	Paraguay	3	1	2	0	2	1	+1	5	Advance to knockout stage
3	Italy	3	1	1	1	4	5	−1	4	Advance to knockout stage
4	Trinidad and Tobago	3	0	1	2	2	6	−4	1	

(H) Hosts
24 September 2009
20:00 UTC+2

Egypt	4–1	Trinidad and Tobago
Afroto 30'; Arafat 51', 90+3'; Talaat 59'	Report	Rochford 36'

Borg El Arab Stadium, Alexandria
Attendance: 74,000
Referee: Frank De Bleeckere (Belgium)

25 September 2009
16:00 UTC+2

Paraguay	0–0	Italy
	Report

Cairo International Stadium, Cairo
Attendance: 4,628
Referee: Subkhiddin Mohd Salleh (Malaysia)

28 September 2009
18:45 UTC+2

Italy	2–1	Trinidad and Tobago
Albertazzi 39'; Raggio Garibaldi 78'	Report	Clarence 67'

Cairo International Stadium, Cairo
Attendance: 57,164
Referee: Peter O'Leary (New Zealand)

28 September 2009
21:30 UTC+2

Egypt	1–2	Paraguay
Afroto 38'	Report	Santander 27'; Paniagua 90+4'

Cairo International Stadium, Cairo
Attendance: 57,164
Referee: Ivan Bebek (Croatia)

1 October 2009
21:30 UTC+2

Trinidad and Tobago	0–0	Paraguay
	Report

Al Salam Stadium, Cairo
Attendance: 7,220
Referee: Eddy Maillet (Seychelles)

1 October 2009
21:30 UTC+2

Italy	2–4	Egypt
Eusepi 29'; Albertazzi 53'	Report	Shoukry 23', 45+1'; Bogy 70', 80'

Cairo International Stadium, Cairo
Attendance: 63,674
Referee: Marco Rodríguez (Mexico)

=== Group B ===
Pos	Team	Pld	W	D	L	GF	GA	GD	Pts	Group stage result
1	Spain	3	3	0	0	13	0	+13	9	Advance to knockout stage
2	Venezuela	3	2	0	1	9	3	+6	6	Advance to knockout stage
3	Nigeria	3	1	0	2	5	3	+2	3	Advance to knockout stage
4	Tahiti	3	0	0	3	0	21	−21	0	

25 September 2009
18:45 UTC+2

Nigeria	0–1	Venezuela
	Report	Del Valle 45'

Al Salam Stadium, Cairo
Attendance: 10,540
Referee: Roberto Rosetti (Italy)

25 September 2009
21:30 UTC+2

Spain	8–0	Tahiti
Aarón 11', 15'; Nsue 17', 32'; Mérida 74'; Kike 79', 86'; Herrera 89'	Report

Al Salam Stadium, Cairo
Attendance: 10,540
Referee: Mohamed Benouza (Algeria)

28 September 2009
16:00 UTC+2

Nigeria	0–2	Spain
	Report	Mérida 33', 83' (pen.)

Al Salam Stadium, Cairo
Attendance: 7,955
Referee: Frank De Bleeckere (Belgium)

28 September 2009
18:45 UTC+2

Tahiti	0–8	Venezuela
	Report	Rondón 4', 27' (pen.), 90+2'; Velázquez 19'; Rojas 72'; Del Valle 78', 88', 90+1'

Al Salam Stadium, Cairo
Attendance: 7,955
Referee: Subkhiddin Mohd Salleh (Malaysia)

1 October 2009
18:45 UTC+2

Venezuela	0–3	Spain
	Report	Parejo 12'; Aarón 26' (pen.); Herrera 77'

Al Salam Stadium, Cairo
Attendance: 7,220
Referee: Joel Aguilar (El Salvador)

1 October 2009
18:45 UTC+2

Tahiti	0–5	Nigeria
	Report	Obiorah 15'; Edet 24'; Fatai 34'; Orelesi 45+1'; Adejo 90'

Cairo International Stadium, Cairo
Attendance: 63,674
Referee: Thomas Einwaller (Austria)

=== Group C ===
Pos	Team	Pld	W	D	L	GF	GA	GD	Pts	Group stage result
1	Germany	3	2	1	0	7	1	+6	7	Advance to knockout stage
2	South Korea	3	1	1	1	4	3	+1	4	Advance to knockout stage
3	United States	3	1	0	2	4	7	−3	3	
4	Cameroon	3	1	0	2	3	7	−4	3	

26 September 2009
16:00 UTC+2

United States	0–3	Germany
	Report	Aydilek 30' (pen.); Jungwirth 32'; Schäffler 72'

Mubarak Stadium, Suez
Attendance: 25,000
Referee: Yuichi Nishimura (Japan)

26 September 2009
18:45 UTC+2

Cameroon	2–0	South Korea
Effa 19'; Tiko 64'	Report

Mubarak Stadium, Suez
Attendance: 25,000
Referee: Héctor Baldassi (Argentina)

29 September 2009
16:00 UTC+2

South Korea	1–1	Germany
Kim Min-woo 71'	Report	Sukuta-Pasu 32'

Mubarak Stadium, Suez
Attendance: 28,000
Referee: Óscar Ruiz (Colombia)

29 September 2009
18:45 UTC+2

United States	4–1	Cameroon
Arguez 45+1'; Taylor 47'; Duka 66'; Ownby 90+1'	Report	Yaya 75' (pen.)

Mubarak Stadium, Suez
Attendance: 28,000
Referee: Jorge Larrionda (Uruguay)

2 October 2009
18:45 UTC+2

Germany	3–0	Cameroon
Sukuta-Pasu 41'; Aydilek 58'; Holtby 70'	Report

Ismailia Stadium, Ismailia
Attendance: 11,000
Referee: Yuichi Nishimura (Japan)

2 October 2009
18:45 UTC+2

South Korea	3–0	United States
Kim Young-gwon 23'; Kim Bo-kyung 42'; Koo Ja-cheol 75' (pen.)	Report

Mubarak Stadium, Suez
Attendance: 27,000
Referee: Roberto Rosetti (Italy)

=== Group D ===
Pos	Team	Pld	W	D	L	GF	GA	GD	Pts	Group stage result
1	Ghana	3	2	1	0	8	3	+5	7	Advance to knockout stage
2	Uruguay	3	2	1	0	6	2	+4	7	Advance to knockout stage
3	Uzbekistan	3	0	1	2	2	6	−4	1	
4	England	3	0	1	2	1	6	−5	1	

26 September 2009
18:45 UTC+2

Ghana	2–1	Uzbekistan
Osei 60'; Adiyiah 75'	Report	Karimov 47'

Ismailia Stadium, Ismailia
Attendance: 12,500
Referee: Alberto Undiano Mallenco (Spain)

26 September 2009
21:30 UTC+2

England	0–1	Uruguay
	Report	Viudez 84'

Ismailia Stadium, Ismailia
Attendance: 10,000
Referee: Olegario Benquerenca (Portugal)

29 September 2009
18:45 UTC+2

Uruguay	3–0	Uzbekistan
Lodeiro 28'; Urretavizcaya 62'; García 83'	Report

Ismailia Stadium, Ismailia
Attendance: 13,000
Referee: Roberto Rosetti (Italy)

29 September 2009
21:30 UTC+2

Ghana	4–0	England
Adiyiah 38', 88'; Ayew 57'; Osei 82'	Report

Ismailia Stadium, Ismailia
Attendance: 13,000
Referee: Yuichi Nishimura (Japan)

2 October 2009
21:30 UTC+2

Uruguay	2–2	Ghana
Lodeiro 74'; Hernández 90+1'	Report	Rabiu 54'; Osei 70'

Ismailia Stadium, Ismailia
Attendance: 11,000
Referee: Ivan Bebek (Croatia)

2 October 2009
21:30 UTC+2

Uzbekistan	1–1	England
Nagaev 77'	Report	Nimely 88'

Mubarak Stadium, Suez
Attendance: 27,000
Referee: Óscar Ruiz (Colombia)

=== Group E ===
Pos	Team	Pld	W	D	L	GF	GA	GD	Pts	Group stage result
1	Brazil	3	2	1	0	8	1	+7	7	Advance to knockout stage
2	Czech Republic	3	2	1	0	5	3	+2	7	Advance to knockout stage
3	Costa Rica	3	1	0	2	5	8	−3	3	Advance to knockout stage
4	Australia	3	0	0	3	2	8	−6	0	

27 September 2009
16:00 UTC+2

Brazil	5–0	Costa Rica
Alan Kardec 24', 44'; Giuliano 35'; Teixeira 75'; Boquita 89'	Report

Port Said Stadium, Port Said
Attendance: 16,000
Referee: Thomas Einwaller (Austria)

27 September 2009
18:45 UTC+2

Czech Republic	2–1	Australia
Rabušic 50'; Pekhart 89' (pen.)	Report	Holland 90+4' (pen.)

Port Said Stadium, Port Said
Attendance: 15,634
Referee: Marco Rodríguez (Mexico)

30 September 2009
16:00 UTC+2

Australia	0–3	Costa Rica
	Report	Madrigal 35'; DeVere 82' (o.g.); Guzmán 90+3'

Port Said Stadium, Port Said
Attendance: 17,200
Referee: Mohamed Benouza (Algeria)

30 September 2009
18:45 UTC+2

Brazil	0–0	Czech Republic
	Report

Port Said Stadium, Port Said
Attendance: 17,200
Referee: Alberto Undiano Mallenco (Spain)

3 October 2009
21:30 UTC+2

Costa Rica	2–3	Czech Republic
Estrada 49' (pen.); J. Martínez 61'	Report	Chramosta 11', 86'; Vošahlík 77'

Alexandria Stadium, Alexandria
Attendance: 9,000
Referee: Olegario Benquerenca (Portugal)

3 October 2009
21:30 UTC+2

Australia	1–3	Brazil
Mooy 14'	Report	Ciro 34'; Douglas Costa 62'; Ganso 81'

Port Said Stadium, Port Said
Attendance: 16,200
Referee: Frank De Bleeckere (Belgium)

=== Group F ===
Pos	Team	Pld	W	D	L	GF	GA	GD	Pts	Group stage result
1	Hungary	3	2	0	1	6	3	+3	6	Advance to knockout stage
2	United Arab Emirates	3	1	1	1	3	4	−1	4	Advance to knockout stage
3	South Africa	3	1	1	1	4	6	−2	4	Advance to knockout stage
4	Honduras	3	1	0	2	3	3	0	3	

27 September 2009
18:45 UTC+2

United Arab Emirates	2–2	South Africa
Al Kamali 90+1' (pen.); Awana 90+3'	Report	Erasmus 54', 72'

Alexandria Stadium, Alexandria
Attendance: 14,000
Referee: Joel Aguilar (El Salvador)

27 September 2009
21:30 UTC+2

Honduras	3–0	Hungary
M. Martínez 35', 70'; Peralta 84'	Report

Alexandria Stadium, Alexandria
Attendance: 14,000
Referee: Eddy Maillet (Seychelles)

30 September 2009
18:45 UTC+2

Hungary	4–0	South Africa
Korcsmár 49'; Koman 55' (pen.); Debreceni 71'; Présinger 90'	Report

Alexandria Stadium, Alexandria
Attendance: 12,000
Referee: Héctor Baldassi (Argentina)

30 September 2009
21:30 UTC+2

United Arab Emirates	1–0	Honduras
Khalil 41'	Report

Alexandria Stadium, Alexandria
Attendance: 12,000
Referee: Olegario Benquerenca (Portugal)

3 October 2009
18:45 UTC+2

Hungary	2–0	United Arab Emirates
Németh 19'; Koman 23'	Report

Alexandria Stadium, Alexandria
Attendance: 9,000
Referee: Peter O'Leary (New Zealand)

3 October 2009
18:45 UTC+2

South Africa	2–0	Honduras
Jali 31'; Khumalo 46'	Report

Port Said Stadium, Port Said
Attendance: 16,200
Referee: Jorge Larrionda (Uruguay)

=== Ranking of third-placed teams ===
Pos	Grp	Team	Pld	W	D	L	GF	GA	GD	Pts	Result
1	A	Italy	3	1	1	1	4	5	−1	4	Advance to knockout stage
2	F	South Africa	3	1	1	1	4	6	−2	4	Advance to knockout stage
3	B	Nigeria	3	1	0	2	5	3	+2	3	Advance to knockout stage
4	E	Costa Rica	3	1	0	2	5	8	−3	3	Advance to knockout stage
5	C	United States	3	1	0	2	4	7	−3	3	
6	D	Uzbekistan	3	0	1	2	2	6	−4	1	

== Knockout stage ==
Round of 16
5 October 2009 — Cairo
Paraguay	0
South Korea	3
6 October 2009 — Ismailia
Ghana (a.e.t.)	2
South Africa	1
5 October 2009 — Cairo
Spain	1
Italy	3
6 October 2009 — Alexandria
Hungary (p)	2 (4)
Czech Republic	2 (3)
7 October 2009 — Port Said
Brazil	3
Uruguay	1
7 October 2009 — Suez
Germany	3
Nigeria	2
7 October 2009 — Suez
Venezuela	1
United Arab Emirates	2
6 October 2009 — Cairo
Egypt	0
Costa Rica	2

Quarter-finals
9 October 2009 — Suez
South Korea	2
Ghana	3
9 October 2009 — Suez
Italy	2
Hungary (a.e.t.)	3
10 October 2009 — Cairo
Brazil (a.e.t.)	2
Germany	1
10 October 2009 — Cairo
United Arab Emirates	1
Costa Rica (a.e.t.)	2

Semi-finals
13 October 2009 — Cairo
Ghana	3
Hungary	2
13 October 2009 — Cairo
Brazil	1
Costa Rica	0

Final
16 October 2009 — Cairo
Ghana (p)	0 (4)
Brazil	0 (3)
Third place
16 October 2009 — Cairo
Hungary (p)	1 (2)
Costa Rica	1 (0)

=== Round of 16 ===
5 October 2009
16:30

Spain	1 – 3	Italy
Aarón 66' (pen.)	Report	Mustacchio 55', 87'; Mazzarani 61'

Al Salam Stadium, Cairo
Attendance: 6,150
Referee: Héctor Baldassi (Argentina)

5 October 2009
20:00

Paraguay	0 – 3	South Korea
	Report	Kim Bo-kyung 55'; Kim Min-woo 60', 70'

Cairo International Stadium, Cairo
Attendance: 10,720
Referee: Mohamed Benouza (Algeria)

6 October 2009
16:30

Ghana	2 – 1 (a.e.t.)	South Africa
Ayew 66'; Adiyiah 99'	Report	Erasmus 58'

Ismailia Stadium, Ismailia
Attendance: 10,000
Referee: Peter O'Leary (New Zealand)

6 October 2009
20:00

Egypt	0 – 2	Costa Rica
	Report	Mena 21'; Ureña 88'

Cairo International Stadium, Cairo
Attendance: 81,860
Referee: Thomas Einwaller (Austria)

6 October 2009
20:00

Hungary	2 – 2 (a.e.t.)	Czech Republic
Kiss 15'; Koman 99'	Report	Vošahlík 26'; Rabušic 92'
Penalties
Présinger (penalty scored); Koman (penalty scored); Szabó (penalty missed); Gosztonyi (penalty scored); Németh (penalty missed); Balajti (penalty scored)	4 – 3	(penalty missed) Mareček; (penalty scored) Rabušic; (penalty scored) Čelůstka; (penalty scored) Vošahlík; (penalty missed) Morávek; (penalty missed) Řezník

Alexandria Stadium, Alexandria
Attendance: 7,000
Referee: Subkhiddin Mohd Salleh (Malaysia)

7 October 2009
16:30

Brazil	3 – 1	Uruguay
Alan Kardec 22'; Teixeira 24', 31'	Report	Urretavizcaya 36'

Port Said Stadium, Port Said
Attendance: 11,200
Referee: Marco Rodríguez (Mexico)

7 October 2009
16:30

Venezuela	1 – 2	United Arab Emirates
Rondón 12'	Report	Ahmed 22'; Khalil 83'

Mubarak International Stadium, Suez
Attendance: 26,000
Referee: Eddy Maillet (Seychelles)

7 October 2009
20:00

Germany	3 – 2	Nigeria
Kopplin 52', 90+3'; Vrančić 75'	Report	Uchechi 51'; Ibrahim 68'

Mubarak International Stadium, Suez
Attendance: 26,000
Referee: Jorge Larrionda (Uruguay)

=== Quarter-finals ===
9 October 2009
16:30

South Korea	2 – 3	Ghana
Park Hee-seong 31'; Kim Dong-sub 82'	Report	Adiyiah 8', 78'; Osei 28'

Mubarak International Stadium, Suez
Attendance: 31,000
Referee: Joel Aguilar (El Salvador)

9 October 2009
20:00

Italy	2 – 3 (a.e.t.)	Hungary
Mazzotta 82'; Bonaventura 113'	Report	Koman 2' (pen.); Németh 112', 117'

Mubarak International Stadium, Suez
Attendance: 31,000
Referee: Óscar Ruiz (Colombia)

10 October 2009
16:30

Brazil	2 – 1 (a.e.t.)	Germany
Maicon 88', 91'	Report	Holtby 73'

Cairo International Stadium, Cairo
Attendance: 32,935
Referee: Roberto Rosetti (Italy)

10 October 2009
20:00

United Arab Emirates	1 – 2 (a.e.t.)	Costa Rica
Ali 33'	Report	J. Martínez 37'; Ureña 120+2'

Cairo International Stadium, Cairo
Attendance: 32,935
Referee: Ivan Bebek (Croatia)

=== Semi-finals ===
13 October 2009
16:30

Ghana	3 – 2	Hungary
Adiyiah 10', 31'; Quansah 81'	Report	Futács 73'; Balajti 84'

Cairo International Stadium, Cairo
Attendance: 39,812
Referee: Jorge Larrionda (Uruguay)

13 October 2009
20:00

Brazil	1 – 0	Costa Rica
Alan Kardec 67'	Report

Cairo International Stadium, Cairo
Attendance: 39,812
Referee: Alberto Undiano Mallenco (Spain)

=== Third place match ===
16 October 2009
17:00

Hungary	1 – 1	Costa Rica
Koman 90+1' (pen.)	Report	Ureña 81'
Penalties
Németh (penalty scored); Koman (penalty missed); Varga (penalty scored)	2 – 0	(penalty missed) Estrada; (penalty missed) Gamboa; (penalty missed) Luna; (penalty missed) Hernández

Cairo International Stadium, Cairo
Attendance: 67,814
Referee: Yuichi Nishimura (Japan)

=== Final ===
16 October 2009
20:00

Ghana	0 – 0 (a.e.t.)	Brazil
	Report
Penalties
Ayew (penalty scored); Inkoom (penalty scored); Mensah (penalty missed); Addae (penalty missed); Adiyiah (penalty scored); Badu (penalty scored)	4 – 3	(penalty scored) Alan Kardec; (penalty scored) Giuliano; (penalty scored) Douglas Costa; (penalty missed) Souza; (penalty missed) Maicon; (penalty missed) Teixeira

Cairo International Stadium, Cairo
Attendance: 67,814
Referee: Frank De Bleeckere (Belgium)

== Winner ==
2009 FIFA U-20 World Cup winners

Ghana
First title

2nd place	3rd place	4th place
Brazil	Hungary	Costa Rica

== Awards ==
Golden Ball	Silver Ball	Bronze Ball
(Ghana) Dominic Adiyiah	(Brazil) Alex Teixeira	(Brazil) Giuliano
Golden Shoe	Silver Shoe	Bronze Shoe
(Ghana) Dominic Adiyiah	(Hungary) Vladimir Koman	(Spain) Aarón
8 goals	5 goals	4 goals
Golden Glove
(Costa Rica) Esteban Alvarado
FIFA Fair Play Award
Brazil

== Goalscorers ==
With eight goals, Ghana's Dominic Adiyiah was the top scorer. In total, 167 goals were scored by 105 different players, with one of them credited as own goals.

8 goals

- (Ghana) Dominic Adiyiah

5 goals

- (Hungary) Vladimir Koman

4 goals

- (Brazil) Alan Kardec
- (Ghana) Ransford Osei
- (Spain) Aarón Ñíguez
- (Venezuela) Yonathan del Valle
- (Venezuela) Salomón Rondón

3 goals

- (Brazil) Alex Teixeira
- (Costa Rica) Marco Ureña
- (Hungary) Krisztián Németh
- (South Africa) Kermit Erasmus
- (South Korea) Kim Min-woo
- (Spain) Fran Mérida

2 goals

- (Brazil) Maicon
- (Costa Rica) Josué Martínez
- (Czech Republic) Jan Chramosta
- (Czech Republic) Michael Rabušic
- (Czech Republic) Jan Vošahlík
- (Egypt) Afroto
- (Egypt) Hossam Arafat
- (Egypt) Bogy
- (Egypt) Ahmed Shoukry
- (Germany) Semih Aydilek
- (Germany) Lewis Holtby
- (Germany) Björn Kopplin
- (Germany) Richard Sukuta-Pasu
- (Ghana) André Ayew
- (Honduras) Mario Martínez
- (Italy) Michelangelo Albertazzi
- (Italy) Mattia Mustacchio
- (South Korea) Kim Bo-kyung
- (Spain) Ander Herrera
- (Spain) Kike
- (Spain) Emilio Nsue
- (United Arab Emirates) Ahmed Khalil
- (Uruguay) Nicolás Lodeiro
- (Uruguay) Jonathan Urretavizcaya

1 goal

- (Australia) James Holland
- (Australia) Aaron Mooy
- (Brazil) Boquita
- (Brazil) Ciro
- (Brazil) Douglas Costa
- (Brazil) Giuliano
- (Brazil) Ganso
- (Cameroon) Andre Akono Effa
- (Cameroon) Germain Tiko
- (Cameroon) Banana Yaya
- (Costa Rica) Diego Estrada
- (Costa Rica) David Guzmán
- (Costa Rica) Diego Madrigal
- (Costa Rica) José Mena
- (Czech Republic) Tomáš Pekhart
- (Egypt) Mohamed Talaat
- (England) Alex Nimely
- (Germany) Florian Jungwirth
- (Germany) Manuel Schäffler
- (Germany) Mario Vrančić
- (Ghana) Abeiku Quansah
- (Ghana) Mohammed Rabiu
- (Honduras) Arnold Peralta
- (Hungary) Ádám Balajti
- (Hungary) András Debreceni
- (Hungary) Márkó Futács
- (Hungary) Máté Kiss
- (Hungary) Zsolt Korcsmár
- (Hungary) Ádám Présinger
- (Italy) Giacomo Bonaventura
- (Italy) Umberto Eusepi
- (Italy) Andrea Mazzarani
- (Italy) Antonio Mazzotta
- (Italy) Silvano Raggio Garibaldi
- (Nigeria) Daniel Adejo
- (Nigeria) Ibok Edet
- (Nigeria) Kehinde Fatai
- (Nigeria) Rabiu Ibrahim
- (Nigeria) Nwankwo Obiorah
- (Nigeria) Nurudeen Orelesi
- (Nigeria) Danny Uchechi
- (Paraguay) Aldo Paniagua
- (Paraguay) Federico Santander
- (South Africa) Andile Jali
- (South Africa) Sibusiso Khumalo
- (South Korea) Kim Dong-sub
- (South Korea) Kim Young-gwon
- (South Korea) Koo Ja-cheol
- (South Korea) Park Hee-seong
- (Spain) Dani Parejo
- (Trinidad and Tobago) Juma Clarence
- (Trinidad and Tobago) Jean Luc Rochford
- (United Arab Emirates) Mohamed Ahmed
- (United Arab Emirates) Ahmed Ali
- (United Arab Emirates) Hamdan Al Kamali
- (United Arab Emirates) Theyab Awana
- (United States) Bryan Arguez
- (United States) Dilly Duka
- (United States) Brian Ownby
- (United States) Tony Taylor
- (Uruguay) Santiago García
- (Uruguay) Abel Hernández
- (Uruguay) Tabaré Viudez
- (Uzbekistan) Sherzod Karimov
- (Uzbekistan) Ivan Nagaev
- (Venezuela) Óscar Rojas
- (Venezuela) José Manuel Velázquez

1 own goal

- (Australia) Luke DeVere (playing against Costa Rica)

== Final ranking ==
Pos	Team	Pld	W	D	L	GF	GA	GD	Pts	Final result
1	Ghana	7	5	2	0	16	8	+8	17	Champions
2	Brazil	7	5	2	0	14	3	+11	17	Runners-up
3	Hungary	7	3	2	2	14	11	+3	11	Third place
4	Costa Rica	7	3	1	3	10	11	−1	10	Fourth place
5	Germany	5	3	1	1	11	5	+6	10	Eliminated in Quarter-finals
6	South Korea	5	2	1	2	9	6	+3	7	Eliminated in Quarter-finals
7	Italy	5	2	1	2	9	9	0	7	Eliminated in Quarter-finals
8	United Arab Emirates	5	2	1	2	6	7	−1	7	Eliminated in Quarter-finals
9	Spain	4	3	0	1	14	3	+11	9	Eliminated in Round of 16
10	Czech Republic	4	2	2	0	7	5	+2	8	Eliminated in Round of 16
11	Uruguay	4	2	1	1	7	5	+2	7	Eliminated in Round of 16
12	Venezuela	4	2	0	2	10	5	+5	6	Eliminated in Round of 16
13	Egypt (H)	4	2	0	2	9	7	+2	6	Eliminated in Round of 16
14	Paraguay	4	1	2	1	2	4	−2	5	Eliminated in Round of 16
15	South Africa	4	1	1	2	5	8	−3	4	Eliminated in Round of 16
16	Nigeria	4	1	0	3	7	6	+1	3	Eliminated in Round of 16
17	Honduras	3	1	0	2	3	3	0	3	Eliminated in Group stage
18	United States	3	1	0	2	4	7	−3	3	Eliminated in Group stage
19	Cameroon	3	1	0	2	3	7	−4	3	Eliminated in Group stage
20	Uzbekistan	3	0	1	2	2	6	−4	1	Eliminated in Group stage
20	Trinidad and Tobago	3	0	1	2	2	6	−4	1	Eliminated in Group stage
22	England	3	0	1	2	1	6	−5	1	Eliminated in Group stage
23	Australia	3	0	0	3	2	8	−6	0	Eliminated in Group stage
24	Tahiti	3	0	0	3	0	21	−21	0	Eliminated in Group stage

(H) Hosts
