= Ekramy El-Shahat =

Egyptian footballer (born 1955)

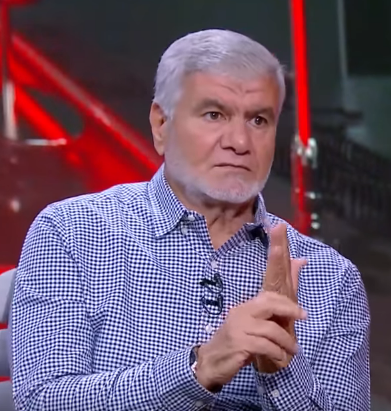
- Ekramy El-Shahat in 2020

Personal information
- Full name: Ekramy Ahmad El-Shahat
- Date of birth: 26 October 1955 (age 71)
- Place of birth: Suez, Egypt
- Height: 1.82 m (6 ft 0 in)
- Position: Goalkeeper

Youth career
- 1969–1971: Al Ahly

Senior career*
Years	Team	Apps	(Gls)
1971–1987	Al Ahly	332	(0)

International career
1974–1985	Egypt	46	(0)
- * Club domestic league appearances and goals

Ekramy Ahmad El-Shahat (Arabic: إكرامي أحمد الشحات; born 26 October 1955) is an Egyptian former footballer who played as a goalkeeper for Al Ahly as well as the Egypt national team in between 1971 and 1987.

== Biography ==
Ekramy known as "Africa Monster", as some fans called him, was born in the city of Suez in October 1955. He joined Al Ahly's youth in 1969. After less than two years, he was promoted to the first team in 1971, and played his first match in a friendly against Suez SC, in a period in which sports activities were dormant, due to the War of Attrition; however, Al Ahly managed to win 5–1.

The official debut of the Ekramy was difficult with Al Ahly, as he played against Al Ittihad in the 1972–73 season, in which Al Ahly were defeated 1–0 at home. Hence, people predicted that he would be dropped as the first choice goalkeeper, but coach Abdu Saleh El-Wahsh had faith in him, and gave him an opportunity against Ismaily, when Al Ahly won 1–0, which helped Ekramy to commence his career.

Later on, Ekramy participated in more than 300 games with Al Ahly, to break the previous record of Adel Hekal, who played in 14 consecutive years.

Ekramy decided to retire from the game in 1987, having spent with Al Ahly more than 18 years, that helped him to win the Egyptian League 10 times, Egyptian Soccer Cup five times, the African Cup Winners' Cup three times, and the CAF Champions League once.

He played for the Egypt national team in FIFA World Cup qualifying matches, in addition to three African Cup of Nations, and the 1975 Mediterranean Games.

== Personal life ==
Two of his sons, Ahmad Ekramy (1980–2006) and Sherif Ekramy also played as goalkeepers for Al Ahly.
