= Sherif Ekramy =

Egyptian footballer (born 1983)

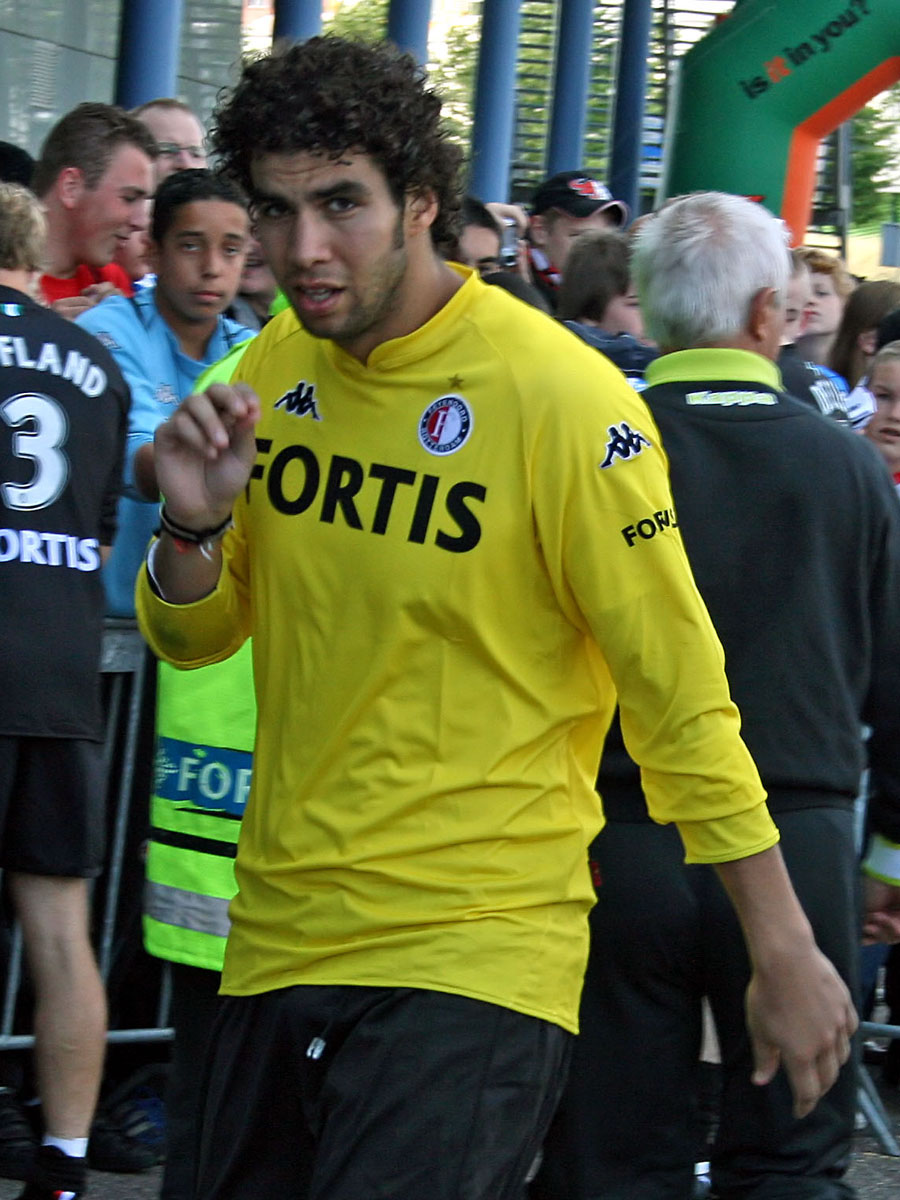
- Ekramy with Feyenoord in 2007

Personal information
- Full name: Sherif Ekramy Ahmed Ahmed El-Shahat
- Date of birth: 10 July 1983 (age 43)
- Place of birth: Cairo, Egypt
- Height: 1.92 m (6 ft 4 in)
- Position: Goalkeeper

Youth career
- 1992–2003: Al Ahly

Senior career*
Years	Team	Apps	(Gls)
2003–2005	Al Ahly	2	(0)
2005–2009	Feyenoord	7	(0)
2008–2009	→ MKE Ankaragücü (loan)	0	(0)
2009	El Gouna	9	(0)
2010–2020	Al Ahly	151	(0)
2020–2026	Pyramids	51	(0)

International career
2001–2003	Egypt U20	5	(0)
2006–2018	Egypt	22	(0)
- * Club domestic league appearances and goals as of 27 May 2024

Sherif Ekramy Ahmed Ahmed El-Shahat (Egyptian Arabic: شريف إكرامي أحمد أحمد الشحات; born 10 July 1983) is an Egyptian former professional footballer who played as a goalkeeper.

An Al Ahly youth product, Ekramy moved to Dutch club Feyenoord in 2005. At Feyenoord he received little playing time and was loaned to Ankaragücü in 2008. After four years at Feyenoord he returned to Egypt signing with El Gouna FC, whom he helped win promotion to the top flight for the 2009–10 season. He returned to Al Ahly in 2010, where he stayed for ten years. In 2020, he joined his last club Pyramids FC.

Ekramy participated in two successive World Youth cups, the 2001 in Argentina, where he was part of the bronze-medal team, and the 2003 instalment in the United Arab Emirates. He is the son of Ekramy El-Shahat.

== Club career ==
=== Al Ahly ===
Ekramy was one of the most promising youngster in Al Ahly youth department so he was promoted for the first team in 2002 at the age of 19. Although he never played for the first team until 2004, his amazing performance as a captain with Egypt U-20 in 2003 African Youth Championship helped The Young Pharaohs to win the title. He received a lot of offers but he decided finally to join Feyenoord to be alongside his former teammate Hossam Ghaly

=== Feyenoord ===
Ekramy's spell in the Netherlands was not very successful. Although signed as a great talent, he was usually a reserve keeper.

On 11 February 2007, he played his first Eredivisie match for Feyenoord against FC Twente. With the club he only played seven matches in three years helping them to win the 2007–08 KNVB Cup in his last season.

=== Return to Al-Ahly ===
Ekramy rejoined Al-Ahly in 2010 until 2020, where he managed to win 21 domestic and continental titles.

=== Pyramids and retirement ===
In June 2020, Ekramy joined Egyptian Premier League club Pyramids FC. He announced his retirement from professional football on 16 July 2026.

== International career ==
In May 2018, he was named in Egypt's preliminary squad for the 2018 FIFA World Cup in Russia.

== Career statistics ==
=== Club ===
Appearances and goals by club, season and competition
Club	Season	League		Cup		Continental		Other		Total	
Club	Season	App	Goals	App	Goals	App	Goals	App	Goals	App	Goals
Al Ahly	2003–04	2	0	0	0	0	0	—		2	0
Feyenoord	2005–06	3	0	0	0	0	0	—		3	0
Feyenoord	2006–07	3	0	0	0	0	0	—		3	0
Feyenoord	2007–08	1	0	0	0	0	0	—		1	0
Feyenoord	Total	7	0	0	0	0	0	—		7	0
El Gouna	2009–10	9	0	0	0	—		—		9	0
Al Ahly	2009–10	7	0	5	0	9	0	0	0	21	0
Al Ahly	2010–11	7	0	2	0	0	0	1	0	10	0
Al Ahly	2011–12	14	0	0	0	14	0	0	0	28	0
Al Ahly	2012–13	15	0	0	0	17	0	1	0	33	0
Al Ahly	2013–14	22	0	3	0	7	0	1	0	33	0
Al Ahly	2014–15	18	0	4	0	5	0	1	0	28	0
Al Ahly	2015–16	26	0	0	0	4	0	1	0	31	0
Al Ahly	2016–17	30	0	2	0	14	0	1	0	47	0
Al Ahly	2017–18	7	0	0	0	0	0	0	0	7	0
Al Ahly	2018–19	8	0	0	0	2	0	0	0	10	0
Al Ahly	Total	154	0	16	0	72	0	6	0	248	0

=== International ===
As of match played 15 June 2018

Appearances and goals by national team and year
National team	Year	Apps	Goals
Egypt	2006	1	0
Egypt	2012	2	0
Egypt	2013	9	0
Egypt	2014	4	0
Egypt	2015	1	0
Egypt	2016	1	0
Egypt	2017	4	0
Egypt	2018	1	0
Egypt	Total	23	0

== Honours and achievements ==
Feyenoord

- KNVB Cup: 2007–08

Al Ahly

- Egyptian Premier League: 2009–10, 2010–11, 2013–14, 2015–16, 2016–17, 2017–18, 2018–19, 2019–20
- Egypt Cup: 2016–17, 2019–20
- Egyptian Super Cup: 2010, 2014, 2015, 2017, 2018
- CAF Champions League: 2012, 2013, 2019–20
- CAF Confederation Cup: 2014
- CAF Super Cup: 2013, 2014

Pyramids

- Egypt Cup: 2023–24
- CAF Champions League: 2024–25
