= Ahmed Sobhi =

Egyptian footballer (born 1991)

Personal information
- Date of birth: March 4, 1991 (age 35)
- Height: 1.83 m (6 ft 0 in)
- Position: Right-back

Team information
- Current team: Enppi
- Number: 2

Youth career
- –2012: ENPPI

Senior career*
Years	Team	Apps	(Gls)
2012–2017	ENPPI	52	(1)
2017–2018	Al Mokawloon	14	(0)
2018	Petrojet	12	(0)
2019	Smouha	10	(0)
2019–	El Gouna	0	(0)

International career^{‡}
	Egypt U20	9	(0)
	Egypt U23	1	(0)
2011	Egypt	1	(0)
- * Club domestic league appearances and goals as of 10 July 2017 ‡ National team caps and goals as of 10 July 2017

Ahmed Sobhi (Arabic: أحمد صبحي; born March 4, 1991) is an Egyptian professional footballer who plays as a right-back for Egyptian Premier League club El Gouna FC.

He also played with Egyptian National Teams U20, U23 and the first team, his international debut was during a 2–1 away loss against Sierra Leone in 2013 African Cup on Nations qualifications on September 3, 2011. In 2015, he renewed his contract with Enppi by signing a 5-year contract.
