= Francis Akwaffo-Boateng =

Ghanaian footballer

Francis Akwaffo
Personal information
- Full name: Francis Akwaffo-Boateng
- Date of birth: September 7, 1991 (age 35)
- Place of birth: Anum, Ghana
- Height: 1.87 m (6 ft 1 1/2 in)
- Position: Midfielder

Team information
- Current team: Al Nasr Benghazi

Youth career
- Larteh United FC

Senior career*
Years	Team	Apps	(Gls)
2004–2006	Ba United		
2007–2011	Asante Kotoko		
2011–	Al Ittihad Alexandria	16	(1)
2013–15	→ Al Nasr Benghazi (loan)		

International career
2007	Ghana U-23		
- * Club domestic league appearances and goals

Francis Akwaffo-Boateng (born September 7, 1991, in Anum) is a Ghanaian footballer who plays for Al Nasr Benghazi.

== Club career ==
He began his career in the youth from Larteh United and joined than in 2004 to Ba United. After two big seasons with Ba United, he was transferred on 24 October 2007 to Asante Kotoko. The right winger started on 15 July 2009 a one-week trial with Germany-based club FSV Frankfurt and turned later back to Asante Kotoko.

== International career ==
Akwaffo is former member of the Black Meteors.
