= Samuel Ocran =

Ghanaian footballer

Personal information
- Date of birth: 16 September 1986 (age 40)
- Place of birth: Ghana
- Height: 1.84 m (6 ft 0 in)
- Position: Midfielder

Senior career*
Years	Team	Apps	(Gls)
2010–2012	El Gouna FC		
2012–2013	Dibba Al Fujairah	1	(0)
- * Club domestic league appearances and goals

Samuel Ocran (born 16 September 1986) is a Ghanaian former professional footballer who played as a midfielder.
