= Sibusiso Khumalo (soccer, born 1989) =

South African footballer

Personal information
- Full name: Sibusiso Phiwa Blessing Khumalo
- Date of birth: 8 September 1989 (age 37)
- Place of birth: KwaMashu, South Africa
- Position: Left back

Team information
- Current team: Black Leopards
- Number: 33

Youth career
- Stars of Africa Academy

Senior career*
Years	Team	Apps	(Gls)
2008–2010	Moroka Swallows	23	(4)
2010–2013	Mamelodi Sundowns	16	(0)
2013–2016	SuperSport United	52	(3)
2016–2018	Kaizer Chiefs	12	(0)
2018–2019	Ajax Cape Town	6	(0)
2019–2020	TS Sporting	15	(1)
2020–	Black Leopards	14	(0)

International career^{‡}
2009	South Africa U20	4	(1)
2013–	South Africa	10	(0)
- * Club domestic league appearances and goals as of 09:08, 21 March 2021 (UTC) ‡ National team caps and goals as of 09:08, 21 March 2021 (UTC)

Sibusiso Khumalo (born 8 September 1989) is a South African professional soccer player who plays as a defender for Black Leopards.
