= Walid Soliman (footballer) =

Egyptian footballer (born 1984)

Personal information
- Full name: Walid Soliman Said Ebid
- Date of birth: 1 December 1984 (age 41)
- Place of birth: Beni Mazar, Minya, Egypt
- Height: 1.74 m (5 ft 9 in)
- Positions: Winger; attacking midfielder

Youth career
- 2002–2004: Beni Mazar

Senior career*
Years	Team	Apps	(Gls)
2004–2005	Haras El Hodoud		
2005–2006	El Gouna		
2006–2010	Petrojet	50	(11)
2009	→ Al-Ahli (loan)		
2010–2011	ENPPI	26	(4)
2011–2022	Al Ahly	178	(44)
Total		374	(84)

International career
2007–2019	Egypt	29	(1)
- * Club domestic league appearances and goals

Walid Soliman Said Ebid (Arabic: وَلِيد سُلَيْمَان سَعِيد عُبَيْد; born 1 December 1984) is an Egyptian former professional footballer who last played as a winger and an attacking midfielder for Egyptian Premier League club Al Ahly SC. Soliman made 29 appearances and scored one goal for the Egypt national team from 2007 to 2019.

== Club career ==
=== Early career ===
Soliman, who was born in Minya, played for his home town youth team; Beni Mazar Sports Centre. In 2004, he moved to Haras El-Hodoud and played for its U-20 youth team. However, he managed to appear for the club's first team in few matches under the coaching of Helmi Tolan. He was also among the Haras El-Hodoud squad that finished third in the 2004–05 Egyptian Premier League.

=== Gouna FC ===
In 2005 and under the coaching of Kamal Etman, Soliman moved to Gouna FC, which at that time was competing in the Egyptian Second Division. Although, he helped the team to finish top of its group, it failed to achieve promotion to Egyptian Premier League in the play-offs. Gouna FC finished third in the play-offs group which included Beni Suef telephones, Sohag Nile and Asyut Petroleum in addition to Gouna. It was Asyut Petroleum that eventually won promotion that season.

=== Petrojet ===
Mokhtar Mokhtar, PetroJet manager, was convinced by Soliman skills. The newly promoted team signed him in the summer transfer window in preparation for the 2006–07 Egyptian Premier League. Soliman began a new life of shining as he scored his first goal in Petrojet's first Premier League match leading the team to beat Geish 3–2. Soliman firmly established himself in the Egyptian League and as a result earned his first call-up by the Egypt national football team manager Hassan Shehata.

=== Ahli Jeddah ===
In January 2009, Soliman preferred to move abroad. He agreed to a six-months loan deal from the Saudi side Ahli Jeddah as PertoJet accepted the Saudi $500,000 offer to complete the deal. Soliman was able to leave a good imprint as he scored the first goal for his team 3–2 win against Al-Raed. He helped the team finish third place in the 2008-09 Saudi Professional League. However, Soliman's performance did not live up to the expectations with Saudi club that decided not to enter talks with Soliman to extend his contract. Soliman declared that playing out of position was the reason for his less shiny performances.

Soliman returned to PetroJet at the end of the 2008–09 season. He would only play one more season with the team before transferring to Enppi. He scored a total of 19 goals for PetroJet; 17 goals in the Egyptian Premier League, one goal in the 2010 CAF Confederation Cup, and another one in the Egypt Cup.

=== ENPPI ===
In June 2010, Soliman eventually accepted to join ENPPI, which also belongs to the Egyptian petroleum companies sector as well as PetroJet. Although Egyptian giant Al Ahly had expressed interest in acquiring his services for several times and in return Soliman repeatedly declared his acceptance, Petrojet was reluctant to allow the transfer to materialize. Soliman later explained the reason behind eventually favoring ENPPI instead as he said, "I preferred ENPPI because I felt that Ahli were not serious in their interest, the same goes for Zamalek".

=== Al Ahly ===
In August 2011, Soliman eventually accepted to join Al Ahly.

== International career ==
As of August 2013, Soliman played with Egypt only 28 caps. He appeared for the first time in the Pan Arab Games 2007, he played two matches from Egypt's four matches in the tournament. He helped the Pharaohs to win both Sudan and Saudi Arabia in the two matches that he played. Egypt eventually won the championship.

== Career statistics ==
=== Club ===
Appearances and goals by club, season and competition
Club	Season	League			National Cup		Continental		Other		Total	
Club	Season	Division	Apps	Goals	Apps	Goals	Apps	Goals	Apps	Goals	Apps	Goals
Al Ahly	2010–11	Egyptian Premier League	0	0	2	1	2	0	0	0	4	1
Al Ahly	2011–12	Egyptian Premier League	12	2	0	0	10	3	0	0	22	5
Al Ahly	2012–13	Egyptian Premier League	4	3	0	0	11	3	4	0	19	6
Al Ahly	2013–14	Egyptian Premier League	0	0	1	0	0	0	2	0	3	0
Al Ahly	2014–15	Egyptian Premier League	26	7	2	1	4	1	2	0	34	9
Al Ahly	2015–16	Egyptian Premier League	24	1	4	0	8	0	1	0	37	1
Al Ahly	2016–17	Egyptian Premier League	30	9	3	2	13	0	1	0	47	11
Al Ahly	2017–18	Egyptian Premier League	20	8	2	0	13	6	1	0	36	14
Al Ahly	2018–19	Egyptian Premier League	15	1	0	0	3	0	0	0	18	1
Al Ahly	2019–20	Egyptian Premier League	29	9	2	2	9	3	0	0	40	14
Al Ahly	2020–21	Egyptian Premier League	11	3	5	1	4	1	0	0	20	5
Al Ahly	2021–22	Egyptian Premier League	7	1	0	0	5	0	3	0	15	1
Al Ahly	Career total (Al Ahly)		178	44	21	7	82	17	14	0	295	68

^{1}Includes appearances in the Egypt Cup
^{2}Continental only Includes appearances in the CAF Champions League
^{3}Includes appearances in the Championship Playoff, Egyptian Super Cup, CAF Super Cup and FIFA Club World Cup

=== International goals ===
Scores and results list Egypt's goal tally first.

No	Date	Venue	Opponent	Score	Result	Competition
1	16 December 2010	Khalifa International Stadium, Doha, Qatar	Qatar	1–2	1–2	Friendly

== Honours and achievements ==
=== Club ===
Al Ahly

- Egyptian Premier League: 2013–14, 2015–16, 2016–17, 2017–18, 2018–19, 2019–20
- Egypt Cup: 2016–17, 2019–20
- Egyptian Super Cup: 2011, 2014, 2015, 2017, 2018
- CAF Champions League: 2012, 2013, 2019–20, 2020–21
- CAF Confederation Cup: 2014
- CAF Super Cup: 2013, 2014, 2021 (May), 2021 (December)

=== International ===
Egypt

- Pan Arab Games: 2007
- Nile Basin Tournament: 2011
