= Mahmoud Samna =

Egyptian footballer (born 1983)

Personal information
- Birth name: Mahmoud Abdel-Aati
- Date of birth: November 1, 1983 (age 42)
- Place of birth: Ismailia, Egypt
- Height: 1.83 m (6 ft 0 in)
- Positions: Centre-back; defensive midfielder; sweeper

Team information
- Current team: Petrojet

Youth career
- Al-Qanah

Senior career*
Years	Team	Apps	(Gls)
	Tersana	??	
2004–2007	Al-Ittihad Al-Iskandary	??	(1)
2008–2009	Asyut Petroleum	24	(3)
2009–pres.	Petrojet		

International career
??	Egypt U-18	10	(0)
	Egypt U-20	1	(0)
- * Club domestic league appearances and goals

Mahmoud "Samna" Abdel-Aati (Arabic: محمود سمنة عبد العاطي; born November 1, 1983) is an Egyptian football defender who currently plays for Petrojet.

== Career ==
Samna is one of the famous defenders in the Egyptian Premier League, known for his style of play. A defender, who also has good attacking headers.

At the start of the 2007–2008 season, when the manager Mohamed Amer was under pressure from fans after losing a number of matches, Samna was caught on camera going to the away stand of the Cairo International Stadium to calm the Al-Ittihad Al-Iskandary fans down himself, and asking them to stop chanting against his manager.

His headed goal for Al-Ittihad Al-Iskandary at Petrojet in the final days of the 2007–2008 season is one of the most famous in the Alexandrian club's history, as it kept them from being relegated for the first time from the Egyptian Premier League.

He joined Asyut Petroleum from Al-Ittihad Al-Iskandary in 2008 for a record club salary fee. In summer 2009, he rejected offers from El Zamalek and Ismaily and signed for Petrojet for around €100,000.

== Transfer speculation ==
It has been reported that he was going to sign for Turkish Super Lig club Galatasaray in summer 2009 and prior to this, African champions Al-Ahly, in January 2009.

In March 2010, he received an offer from Finnish Veikkausliiga club FC Lahti, which Petrojet rejected.

== International career ==
He has been a regular international for the Under-18 Egypt and played for the Under-20 Egypt as well.
