= Al Masry Club Stadium =

Football stadium in Port Said, Egypt

Coordinates: 31°16′16″N 32°17′29″E

- ستاد النادي المصري
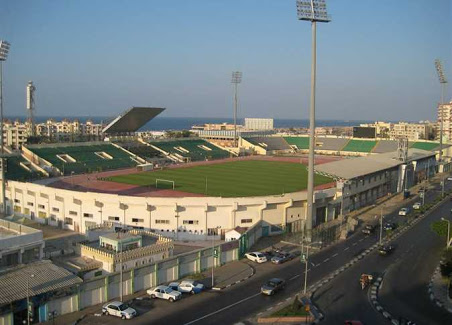
- Interactive map of Al Masry Club Stadium
- Former names: Port Said Stadium
- Location: Al Manakh, Port Said, Egypt
- Owner: Al Masry Sporting Club
- Operator: Al Masry
- Capacity: 18,000
- Surface: Grass

Construction
- Opened: 16 October 1955; 70 years ago
- Closed: 2019
- Demolished: 4 July 2021
- Architect: Vasilios Trivoulides

Tenant
- Al Masry (1955–2012; 2018)

Al Masry Club Stadium (Arabic: ستاد النادي المصري), formerly known as Port Said Stadium (Arabic: ستاد بور سعيد), was a multi-use all-seated stadium in Al Manakh, Port Said, Egypt, which was mostly used for football and was the home of Al Masry since 1958 and until the Port Said Stadium riot in 2012. In 2021, the stadium was closed to prepare for the demolition process, which was completed in mid-2022.

The stadium, which had a seating capacity of 18,000, was opened on 16 October 1955, and was the main sports venue in Port Said. It was completely demolished in 2021, and a new sports complex is currently being built in the same area that will include a new stadium.

The stadium also hosted some matches in tournaments held in Egypt, including 1997 FIFA U-17 World Championship, 2006 Africa Cup of Nations, 2007 Pan Arab Games Football Tournament and 2009 FIFA U-20 World Cup.

== Port Said Stadium riot ==
On 1 February 2012, following a league match between Al Masry and Al Ahly, a riot broke out, resulting in the deaths of 72 Al Ahly fans, alongside an Al Masry supporter and a police officer, making it the deadliest tragedy in Egyptian sporting history. Some were stabbed and clubbed, while others were thrown off the stands or died in a crowd crush as they were trying to escape through a closed stadium gate in the back of the stands. Hisham Sheha, an official in the Egyptian health ministry, said the deaths were caused by stab wounds, brain hemorrhages, and concussions. Over 500 were injured.

== Later history ==
Al Masry continued to use the stadium as a training ground, and hosted friendly matches on the ground; usually against the youth team or other local clubs.

On 5 January 2016, Port Said governor Adel El Ghadban agreed to transfer the stadium's ownership to Al Masry and changing its name to Al Masry Club Stadium as a result.

The stadium was banned from hosting any official football matches following the 2012 incident, with an exception made in 2018 when the stadium hosted all Al Masry home fixtures in their CAF Confederation Cup campaigns during the 2018 and 2018–19 seasons. The last official match hosted by the stadium was played on 15 December 2018; a 2–0 defeat against Salitas from Burkina Faso.

On 17 February 2019, the stadium was announced as one of the venues to host the 2019 Africa Cup of Nations, however, on 13 March, the stadium was replaced by Al Salam Stadium in Cairo after discovering a major problem with one of the stadium's main stands. The stand's infrastructure was severely damaged and irreparable, and had to be completely demolished. Later, a decision was made to completely demolish the whole stadium and build a new one on the same location.

In late 2019, the stadium was closed to prepare for the demolition process, which was originally scheduled to take place in 2020, but was postponed due to the COVID-19 pandemic in Egypt. More than one year later, demolition work finally began on 4 July 2021, and was completed in June 2022.
