= Mahmoud Tobah =

Egyptian footballer (born 1989)

Mahmoud Toba
Personal information
- Full name: Mahmoud Toba Shaban Osman
- Date of birth: 1 October 1989 (age 37)
- Place of birth: Cairo, Egypt
- Height: 1.79 m (5 ft 10 in)
- Position: Midfielder

Team information
- Current team: ENPPI Club

Youth career
- 2007–2010: Al-Ahly

Senior career*
| Years | Team | Apps | (Gls) |
| 2010–2011 | → Misr El Makasa (loan) | 26 | (1) |
| 2010–2011 | Al-Ahly | 2 | (0) |
| 2011– | Petrojet | | |
| 2011–2012 | → Al-Masry (loan) | 13 | (1) |
| 2013– | ENNPI Club | | |

International career
| 2009 | Egypt U-20 | 4 | (0) |
- * Club domestic league appearances and goals

Mahmoud Toba Shaban Osman (Arabic: محمود توبة شعبان عثمان), is an Egyptian footballer who plays as a midfielder. He plays for ENPPI Club and the Egyptian U-23 national team.

== International career ==
Afroto was a part of the Egypt U-20 national team squad which participated in the 2009 FIFA U-20 World Cup played on home soil.
