= Shehab El-Din Ahmed =

Egyptian footballer (born 1990)

Personal information
- Full name: Shehab El-Din Ahmed Saad Ahmed Saad
- Date of birth: 22 August 1990 (age 36)
- Place of birth: Egypt
- Height: 1.70 m (5 ft 7 in)
- Position: Midfielder

Youth career
- Al Ahly

Senior career*
Years	Team	Apps	(Gls)
2008–2014	Al Ahly	48	(3)
2014–2015	El-Gaish	10	(0)
2015	Petrojet	10	(1)
2015–2018	El Entag El Harby	49	(1)
2018	Al Assiouty	6	(0)
2018–2019	Al-Bukayriyah		
2020	Al-Taqadom		

International career
2009–2010	Egypt U-20	12	(2)
2010–2012	Egypt U-23	26	(1)
- * Club domestic league appearances and goals

Shehab El-Din Ahmed Saad Ahmed Saad (Arabic: شهاب الدين أحمد سعد أحمد سعد) (born on 22 August 1990, Cairo) is an Egyptian footballer who plays as a midfielder. He made his debut with Al Ahly in a Premier League match on 20 May 2009 against Tersana. He scored 3 premier league goals and a famous winning goal against Ettihad Libya in the quarter-final of the Champions league 2010 from a long-distance shot.

Despite a promising start with Al-Ahly, Ahmed left the club in 2014 for Tala'ea El Gaish SC. Spells at Petrojet SC, El Entag El Harby SC and Al Assiouty Sport followed.

He competed in the 2012 Summer Olympics for Egypt.
