= Fábio Júnior (footballer, born 1982) =

Brazilian footballer

Personal information
- Full name: Fábio Júnior dos Santos
- Date of birth: 6 October 1982 (age 44)
- Place of birth: Nossa Senhora da Glória, Sergipe, Brazil
- Height: 1.75 m (5 ft 9 in)
- Position: Forward

Senior career*
Years	Team	Apps	(Gls)
2000	Campinense		
2001	Americano (MA)		
2002	Flamengo (PI)		
2002–2003	Real Madrid Castilla		
2003	Ceará		
2003	Internacional		
2004	Sport Recife		
2004–2005	Campinense		
2005	Chunnam Dragons		
2005	Flamengo		
2006	Madureira		
2006–2008	Vasco da Gama		
2009	Campinense	16	(5)
2010–2011	Naval 1º de Maio	36	(7)
2011–2012	Al Ahly	7	(1)
- * Club domestic league appearances and goals as of 14 June 2011

Fábio Júnior dos Santos (born 6 October 1982), commonly known as Fábio Júnior, is a Brazilian footballer who plays as a forward. He is a physically built striker who is good in the air and has a powerful left foot.

== Club career ==
2011

Egyptian club Al Ahly signed the forward from Portuguese side Naval, on 19 July 2011, on a three-year contract worth $1.2 million ($400,000 per season).

Fábio Júnior was signed in order to strengthen the forward line, which consisted of the already formidable duo of Mohamed Nagy "Geddo" and Dominique Da Silva. However, Junior found games hard to come by often being relegated to the bench (or not even featuring in the match line-up) by then coach Manuel José.

His first appearance would come in the CAF Champions League against MC Alger, replacing Emad Moteab in the 80th minute. Despite finding himself in a few scoring opportunities he was unable to grab a goal. It would be nearly two months before he made his long-awaited début in the Egyptian Premier League, coming on as a substitute against Haras El Hodood.

Fábio would finish the year having played four games for Ahly, but was unable to score a goal.

2012

The turn of the year represented a new beginning for Júnior, as he would feature in three consecutive games against: El Gounah, El Daklyeh and El Geish. He finally scored his debut goal on the 1 February 2012, against Al-Masry. However, the celebrations were short lived as the match was marred by riots after the final whistle. During the post-match clashes, he was not injured.

Fábio Júnior would mark his return to continental football by scoring the opening goal of the tie against Ethiopian Coffee, in the Round of 32 in the CAF Champions League. He later featured in the squad for both legs of the Round of 16 tie with Stade Malien, but was an unused substitute in both matches, with Ahly winning 3-2 on aggregate, to reach the Quarter-finals.

== Honours ==
Nacional Futebol Clube

- Campeonato Amazonense: 2000

Ceará Sporting Club

- Campeonato Cearense: 2002

Sport Club do Recife

- Campeonato Pernambucano: 2003

Madureira Esporte Clube

- Taça Rio: 2006

Al Ahly

- Egyptian Super Cup: 2012
