= Mahmoud Abou El Saoud =

Egyptian footballer (born 1987)

Mahmoud Abou El-Saoud
Personal information
- Full name: Mahmoud Abou El-Saoud Zaki Mohamed Kassem
- Date of birth: November 30, 1987 (age 38)
- Place of birth: Mansoura, Egypt
- Height: 1.90 m (6 ft 3 in)
- Position: Goalkeeper

Team information
- Current team: El Mokawloon El Arab
- Number: 1

Senior career*
Years	Team	Apps	(Gls)
2007–2010	El Mansoura	25	(0)
2008–2009	Smouha (loan)	15	(0)
2010–2014	Al Ahly	7	(0)
2012-2012	→ El Mokawloon El Arab (loan)	1	(0)
2014-2014	→ El Qanah (loan)	8	(0)
2014–	El Mokawloon El Arab	188	(0)

International career
2009–2010	Egypt	1	(0)
- * Club domestic league appearances and goals

Mahmoud Abou El-Saoud Zaki Mohamed Kassem (Arabic: مَحْمُود أَبُو السُّعُود زَكِيّ مُحَمَّد قَاسِم; born November 30, 1987) is an Egyptian footballer who plays as a goalkeeper for Egyptian Premier League side El Mokawloon El Arab and a former member of the Egypt national football team.

== Club career ==
=== Mansoura ===
Although he was still playing for the Egyptian Second Division side Mansoura, Mahmoud Abou El-Saoud greatly shined. After a long and intense race with Smouha in 2008–09, Abou El-Saoud led his club to promote from the second division to the Premier League. He continued to put strong performances with his side in the Premier League and as a result he was called by Hassan Shehata to the Egypt national football team for his first time ever. Even with his effort, Mansoura was eventually relegated to the second division by the end of the 2009–10 season.

=== Al Ahly ===
On 22 June 2010, Mansoura chairman, Ibrahim Megahed, announced the transfer of Mahmoud Abou El-Saoud to the Cairo giant Al Ahly. The transfer was estimated for LE 5 million. He made a few appearances in the league, and despite two goalkeeping mistakes in Al Ahly's match against Ismaily that cost them the game, he started the next game, against Semouha, under new coach Zizo.

== International career ==
Although Mahmoud Abou El-Saoud was part of the Egyptian squad that won the 2010 Africa Cup of Nations, he did not participate in any of the matches.

== Honours ==
Al Ahly

- Egyptian Premier League: 2010–11

Egypt

- Africa Cup of Nations: 2010
