= Mohamed Talaat =

Egyptian footballer (born 1989)

Personal information
- Full name: Mohamed Talaat; Abdelrahman Abdou
- Date of birth: May 14, 1989 (age 37)
- Place of birth: Port Said, Egypt
- Height: 1.80 m (5 ft 11 in)
- Position: Forward

Team information
- Current team: Nogoom FC

Youth career
- Porfouad

Senior career*
Years	Team	Apps	(Gls)
2008–2009	Ahli Dubai	5	(5)
2009–2012	Al Ahly	21	(3)
2011–2012	→ Al-Ittihad Alexandria (loan)	3	(0)
2012–2014	Al Tadamon		
2014–2014	That Ras	2	(2)
2014–2015	Al-Khaburah		
2015	Ghazl El Mahalla		
2015-2016	Misr Lel Taamen		
2017	Petaling Jaya City		
2017–2018	That Ras		
2018–2020	Al Mokawloon Al Arab	39	(4)
2020–2021	Smouha		
2021	→ El Entag El Harby (loan)		
2021–2022	Al Mokawloon Al Arab		
2022–2023	ZED		
2023–	Nogoom FC		

International career
2008–2009	Egypt U-20	10	(6)
- * Club domestic league appearances and goals as of 12 September 2023

Mohamed Talaat Abdelrahman Abdou (Arabic: محمد طلعت عبد الرحمن عبده; born May 14, 1989) is an Egyptian professional footballer who plays as a striker for Egyptian club Nogoom FC.

== Career ==
Talaat began his career at a local team in Port Said called Porfouad. He was chosen to play for the Egypt Under 20 national team in Youth African Cup of Nations. When he managed to become the top goalscorer of the team he was spotted by a number of clubs in Egypt and the Persian Gulf, and later it was announced that he joined UAE side Ahli Dubai.

In January 2009 transfer window, Talaat joined Egyptian Premier League top club Al Ahly, He made his debut with the club in a Premier League match against Tersana.

Talaat has scored his first goal with Al-Ahly in his second appearance with the club at the final game of the 2008–09 season against El-Geish.
