= Mostafa Afroto =

Retired Egyptian footballer (born 1989)

Personal information
- Full name: Mostafa Mahmoud Mohamed Selim
- Date of birth: 17 March 1989 (age 37)
- Place of birth: Cairo, Egypt
- Height: 1.68 m (5 ft 6 in)
- Positions: Attacking midfielder; second striker

Team information
- Current team: Ala'ab Damanhour

Youth career
- 2007–2010: Al-Ahly
- 2008: → Smouha (loan)

Senior career*
Years	Team	Apps	(Gls)
2009–2012	Al-Ahly	10	(2)
2011-2012	→ Al-Ittihad (loan)	8	(1)
2012–2013	FK Qarabağ	4	(0)
2013-2013	Misr El-Makasa	5	(0)
2013–2014	ACS Poli Timișoara	0	(0)
2014–2015	Ala'ab Damanhour	32	(5)
2015–2016	Ismaily	16	(1)
2016–2017	El Sharkia	24	(0)
2017–2018	Entag El Harby	1	(0)
2018–2018	→ Saham Club (loan)	?	(?)
2018–2021	Ala'ab Damanhour		
2021–2022	Al Aluminium SC		
2022–2024	Diamond SC		

International career
2008-2009	Egypt U-20	8	(3)
- * Club domestic league appearances and goals as of 19 March 2019

Mostafa Mahmoud Mohamed Selim (born 17 March 1989), known as Mostafa Afroto (Arabic: مصطفى عفروتو), is an Egyptian footballer who played as an attacking midfielder or a second striker.He retired in 2024. Mostafa is nicknamed "Afroto" (or Little Genie) for his speed, pace and unpredictable moves on the pitch.

== Career ==
On 12 February 2010, Afroto made his club debut during Al-Ahly's match against Ittihad El-Shorta, wherein he came in at the 63rd minute mark as a substitute for Al-Ahly's then Forward, Osama Hosny, wherein they were trailing 0–1. In the same match, Afroto scored his first goal for the club via a long distance free kick, equalizing the match, 1-1. Afroto further contributed on the final minutes of the match by gaining a penalty, in which his teammate, Mohamed Samir converted as the final goal of the match. Al-Ahly eventually won, 4–2. Due to these sequence of events, spectators of Al-Ahly were chanting his name until the match concluded.

Afroto concluded his career with Al-Ahly after the 2012 season and finished with a total of 10 appearances, and 2 goals.

On 21 August 2012, it was announced that he had officially signed for Azerbaijani giants Qarabağ. After only four games for Qarabağ joined Misr El Makasa on a two-and-a-half-year contract.
