= Ahmed Shoukry =

Egyptian footballer (born 1989)

Personal information
- Full name: Ahmed Shoukry Abdelraouf Aly Khalifa
- Date of birth: July 21, 1989 (age 37)
- Place of birth: Cairo, Egypt
- Height: 1.74 m (5 ft 9 in)
- Position: Attacking midfielder

Team information
- Current team: Al Mokawloon Al Arab

Youth career
- 2004–2009: Al Ahly

Senior career*
Years	Team	Apps	(Gls)
2009–2014	Al Ahly	36	(6)
2011–2012	→ TE Bani Sweif (loan)	15	(4)
2014–2016	Smouha	48	(13)
2016–2019	Al Masry	62	(14)
2019–2020	ENPPI	19	(2)
2020–2021	Al Mokawloon Al Arab	12	(1)
2021–	Al Tersana		

International career
2008–2009	Egypt U20	12	(6)
2009–2010	Egypt U23	21	(7)
- * Club domestic league appearances and goals as of 19:26, 10 May 2019 (UTC)

Ahmed Shoukry Abdelraouf Aly Khalifa (Arabic: أحمد شكري عبد الرؤوف علي خليفة; born July 7, 1989) is an Egyptian footballer who plays as an attacking midfielder for Al Mokawloon Al Arab. He has been dubbed as the new Raúl for his technical skill, speed and left foot.

== Career ==
Shoukry has made his debut with Al Ahly in 2009–10 Egyptian Premier League on 19 October 2009 Against Petrojet. Due to the absences of many stars like Mohamed Abo-Treika, Shoukry played in very important matches against Ismaily and Zamalek and he proved he is a great player and can fill in the role of Abo-Treika. Shoukry scored his first goal against Ittihad El-Shorta after coming on as a substitute to help Al Ahly win the game 4–2. Shoukry scored his second goal on the CAF Champions league 2010 in the second leg against Gunners in Cairo to help Al Ahly win the game 2–0. In July 2011, he moved to Telephonat Bani Sweif on a loan deal, scoring 4 goals in 15 games, in the uncompleted 2011–12 Egyptian League.

Shoukry started 2013 with Al Ahly as a substitute, but after the arrival of Mohamed Youssef the new coach Shoukry was put in the starting line up against Telephonat Beni Suef and scored his first goal this season with Al Ahly from a shot the match after Shoukry was in the starting line up against ENPPI and scored from a volley and played a match against Ghazl El Mahalla but couldn't score and had chance in the post.

Shoukry later played for Smouha, Al Masry, and ENPPI, before joining Al Mokawloon Al Arab in November 2020.

== International career ==
Shoukry was a regular member of Egypt U-20 National team and participate in 2009 FIFA U-20 World Cup in Egypt scoring 2 goals in the tournament and against Italy U-20 leading Egypt to a 4–2 win. After arriving late to France to join the Under-23 squad in their preparations for the 2012 Toulon Tournament, Shoukry ended up being benched for the entire tournament. After returning from France, he insulted the coaching staff and head coach Hany Ramzy in public television. He criticized his techniques and accused him of being unfair. Ramzy later omitted him from the squad stating that Shoukry would never play in the 2012 Olympics.
