= Mohamed Samir (footballer) =

Egyptian footballer (born 1987)

Personal information
- Full name: Mohamed Samir Thabet Abdel Rehim
- Date of birth: November 5, 1987 (age 38)
- Place of birth: Kafr El Sheikh, Egypt
- Height: 1.87 m (6 ft 2 in)
- Position: Defender

Team information
- Current team: ZED
- Number: 44

Youth career
- –2006: Al Ahly

Senior career*
Years	Team	Apps	(Gls)
2007–2012	Al Ahly	40	(1)
2011–2012	→ Smouha (loan)	14	(0)
2012–2013	Smouha	0	(0)
2013–2014	Al-Ittihad Al-Sakndary	52	(3)
2015–2022	Al Mokawloon Al Arab	187	(20)
2022–	ZED	30	(5)
- * Club domestic league appearances and goals as of 16 June 2023

Mohamed Samir Thabet Abdel Rehim (Arabic: محمد سمير ثابت عبد الرحيم; born November 5, 1987) is an Egyptian Defender footballer who currently plays for ZED FC.

== Club career ==
Mohamed Samir made his debut for Al Ahly against Enppi in the 2007/2008 season, he was sent off in that game. Samir was one of the few youngsters to play under former coach Manuel Jose. Samir scored his first Al Ahly goal from the penalty spot in a pre-season match against Wydad Casablanca of Morocco which Al Ahly won 2–0. His second goal came against Ittihad El Shorta also from the spot, which Al Ahly won 4–2.
