= 2013 CAF Confederation Cup final =

- Event: 2013 CAF Confederation Cup
| CS Sfaxien | TP Mazembe |
| (Tunisia) | (Democratic Republic of the Congo) |
| 3 | 2 |
- on aggregate

First leg
| CS Sfaxien | TP Mazembe |
| 2 | 0 |
- Date: 23 November 2013
- Venue: Stade Olympique de Radès, Radès
- Referee: Eric Otogo-Castane (Gabon)

Second leg
| TP Mazembe | CS Sfaxien |
| 2 | 1 |
- Date: 30 November 2013
- Venue: Stade TP Mazembe, Lubumbashi
- Referee: Daniel Bennett (South Africa)

The 2013 CAF Confederation Cup final was the final of the 2013 CAF Confederation Cup, the 10th edition of the CAF Confederation Cup, Africa's secondary club football competition organised by the Confederation of African Football (CAF).

The final was contested in two-legged home-and-away format between CS Sfaxien of Tunisia and TP Mazembe of the Democratic Republic of the Congo. The first leg was hosted by CS Sfaxien at the Stade Olympique de Radès in Radès on 23 November 2013, while the second leg was hosted by TP Mazembe at the Stade TP Mazembe in Lubumbashi on 30 November 2013. The winners earned the right to play in the 2014 CAF Super Cup against the winners of the 2013 CAF Champions League.

CS Sfaxien won the first leg 2–0 and despite losing the second leg 2–1, they were crowned CAF Confederation Cup champions for a record third time.

== Background ==
CS Sfaxien had previously reached three CAF Confederation Cup finals, winning twice (2007, 2008) and losing once (2010), while this was the first CAF Confederation Cup final for TP Mazembe.

== Road to the final ==
Note: In all results below, the score of the finalists is given first.

| (Tunisia) CS Sfaxien | | | | Round | (Democratic Republic of the Congo) TP Mazembe | | | |
|---|---|---|---|---|---|---|---|---|
| Confederation Cup | | | | | Champions League | | | |
| Opponent | Agg. | 1st leg | 2nd leg | Qualifying rounds | Opponent | Agg. | 1st leg | 2nd leg |
| Bye | | | | Preliminary round | Bye | | | |
| (The Gambia) Gamtel | 7–3 | 4–2 (H) | 3–1 (A) | First round | (Botswana) Mochudi Centre Chiefs | 7–0 | 1–0 (A) | 6–0 (H) |
| (Republic of the Congo) Diables Noirs | 4–2 | 3–1 (H) | 1–1 (A) | Second round | (South Africa) Orlando Pirates | 2–3 | 1–3 (A) | 1–0 (H) |
Confederation Cup
| (Nigeria) Enugu Rangers | w/o | 0–1 (A) | 0–0 (H) | Play-off round | (Mozambique) Liga Muçulmana | 5–2 | 4–0 (H) | 1–2 (A) |
| Opponent | Result | | | Group stage | Opponent | Result | | |
| (Tunisia) Étoile du Sahel | 1–0 (H) | | | Matchday 1 | (Algeria) ES Sétif | 1–1 (A) | | |
| (Mali) Stade Malien | 2–1 (A) | | | Matchday 2 | (Morocco) FUS Rabat | 3–0 (H) | | |
| (Ethiopia) Saint George | 3–1 (A) | | | Matchday 3 | (Tunisia) CA Bizertin | 0–1 (A) | | |
| (Ethiopia) Saint George | 1–0 (H) | | | Matchday 4 | (Tunisia) CA Bizertin | 1–0 (H) | | |
| (Tunisia) Étoile du Sahel | 1–1 (A) | | | Matchday 5 | (Algeria) ES Sétif | 4–2 (H) | | |
| (Mali) Stade Malien | 0–0 (H) | | | Matchday 6 | (Morocco) FUS Rabat | 0–2 (A) | | |
| Group A winner: Team / Pld / W / D / L / GF / GA / GD / Pts; (Tunisia) CS Sfaxien / 6 / 4 / 2 / 0 / 8 / 3 / +5 / 14; (Mali) Stade Malien / 6 / 2 / 2 / 2 / 3 / 4 / −1 / 8; (Tunisia) Étoile du Sahel / 6 / 1 / 3 / 2 / 3 / 4 / −1 / 6; (Ethiopia) Saint George / 6 / 1 / 1 / 4 / 4 / 7 / −3 / 4; Source: | | | | Final standings | Group B winner: Team / Pld / W / D / L / GF / GA / GD / Pts; (Democratic Republic of the Congo) TP Mazembe / 6 / 3 / 1 / 2 / 9 / 6 / +3 / 10; (Tunisia) CA Bizertin / 6 / 2 / 2 / 2 / 3 / 3 / 0 / 8; (Morocco) FUS Rabat / 6 / 2 / 2 / 2 / 5 / 6 / −1 / 8; (Algeria) ES Sétif / 6 / 1 / 3 / 2 / 5 / 7 / −2 / 6; Source: | | | |
| Opponent | Agg. | 1st leg | 2nd leg | Knock-out stage | Opponent | Agg. | 1st leg | 2nd leg |
| (Tunisia) CA Bizertin | 1–0 | 0–0 (A) | 1–0 (H) | Semifinals | (Mali) Stade Malien | 3–1 | 2–1 (A) | 1–0 (H) |

Notes

1. CS Sfaxien advanced to the group stage after the Enugu Rangers, which had originally won 1–0 on aggregate, were ruled by the CAF to have fielded an ineligible player in the second leg and thus disqualified.

== Rules ==
The final was played on a home-and-away two-legged basis. If the sides were level on aggregate after the second leg, the away goals rule was applied, and if still level, the tie proceeded directly to a penalty shoot-out (no extra time was played).

== Matches ==
=== First leg ===
23 November 2013
18:00 UTC+1

| CS Sfaxien (Tunisia) | 2–0 | (Democratic Republic of the Congo) TP Mazembe |
|---|---|---|
| Ndong 16'; Khenissi 90+1' | Report |

Stade Olympique de Radès, Radès
Referee: Eric Otogo-Castane (Gabon)

| CS Sfaxien | TP Mazembe |

| GK | 28 | (Tunisia) Rami Jridi |
| RB | 8 | (Ghana) Maman Youssoufou |
| CB | 26 | (Tunisia) Bassem Boulaabi |
| CB | 25 | (Tunisia) Mahmoud Ben Salah |
| LB | 10 | (Tunisia) Ali Maâloul (c) |
| RM | 19 | (Tunisia) Maher Hannachi | | (substituted off) 85' |
| CM | 22 | (Gabon) Didier Ndong | (yellow card) 62' |
| CM | 13 | (Tunisia) Ferjani Sassi |
| LM | 15 | (Ivory Coast) Didier Lebri | | (substituted off) 88' |
| SS | 29 | (Tunisia) Fakhreddine Ben Youssef |
| CF | 17 | (Ivory Coast) Idrissa Kouyaté | | (substituted off) 77' |
Substitutions:
| FW | 11 | (Tunisia) Taha Yassine Khenissi | | (substituted on) 77' |
| MF | 7 | (Tunisia) Rebai Wassim Kamoun | | (substituted on) 85' |
| MF | 14 | (Tunisia) Ghazi Challouf | | (substituted on) 88' |
Manager:
(Netherlands) Ruud Krol

| GK | 1 | (Democratic Republic of the Congo) Robert Kidiaba |
| CB | 4 | (Democratic Republic of the Congo) Eric Nkulukuta | (yellow card) 54' |
| CB | 2 | (Democratic Republic of the Congo) Joël Kimwaki |
| CB | 3 | (Democratic Republic of the Congo) Jean Kasusula |
| DM | 14 | (Zambia) Nathan Sinkala | (yellow card) 21' |
| RM | 8 | (Democratic Republic of the Congo) Trésor Mputu (c) |
| LM | 18 | (Zambia) Rainford Kalaba | | (substituted off) 57' |
| AM | 23 | (Ghana) Gladson Awako | | (substituted off) 46' |
| RF | 6 | (Zambia) Felix Sunzu |
| CF | 15 | (Tanzania) Mbwana Samatta |
| LF | 28 | (Tanzania) Thomas Ulimwengu | | (substituted off) 84' |
Substitutions:
| MF | 10 | (Zambia) Given Singuluma | | (substituted on) 46' |
| MF | 29 | (Mali) Boubacar Diarra | | (substituted on) 57' |
| FW | 20 | (Ghana) Solomon Asante | (yellow card) 85' | (substituted on) 84' |
Manager:
(France) Patrice Carteron

Assistant referees:
Théophile Vinga (Gabon)
Jean Engone (Gabon)
Fourth official:
Yves Roponat (Gabon)

=== Second leg ===
30 November 2013
15:30 UTC+2

| TP Mazembe (Democratic Republic of the Congo) | 2–1 | (Tunisia) CS Sfaxien |
|---|---|---|
| Traoré 10'; Samatta 24' | Report | Ben Youssef 88' |

Stade TP Mazembe, Lubumbashi
Attendance: 18 000
Referee: Daniel Bennett (South Africa)

| TP Mazembe | CS Sfaxien |

| GK | 1 | (Democratic Republic of the Congo) Robert Kidiaba |
| CB | 24 | (Ghana) Yaw Frimpong |
| CB | 2 | (Democratic Republic of the Congo) Joël Kimwaki |
| CB | 3 | (Democratic Republic of the Congo) Jean Kasusula | (yellow card) 47' |
| DM | 14 | (Zambia) Nathan Sinkala | (yellow card) 32' |
| RM | 20 | (Ghana) Solomon Asante | | (substituted off) 74' |
| LM | 8 | (Democratic Republic of the Congo) Trésor Mputu (c) |
| AM | 10 | (Zambia) Given Singuluma | | (substituted off) 46' |
| RF | 6 | (Zambia) Felix Sunzu |
| CF | 15 | (Tanzania) Mbwana Samatta | | (substituted off) 70' |
| LF | 25 | (Mali) Cheibane Traoré |
Substitutions:
| FW | 18 | (Zambia) Rainford Kalaba | | (substituted on) 46' |
| MF | 29 | (Mali) Boubacar Diarra | | (substituted on) 70' |
| FW | 28 | (Tanzania) Thomas Ulimwengu | | (substituted on) 74' |
Manager:
(France) Patrice Carteron

| GK | 28 | (Tunisia) Rami Jridi |
| RB | 8 | (Ghana) Maman Youssoufou |
| CB | 26 | (Tunisia) Bassem Boulaabi |
| CB | 25 | (Tunisia) Mahmoud Ben Salah |
| LB | 10 | (Tunisia) Ali Maâloul (c) |
| RM | 19 | (Tunisia) Maher Hannachi | | (substituted off) 77' |
| CM | 22 | (Gabon) Didier Ndong | (yellow card) 62' |
| CM | 13 | (Tunisia) Ferjani Sassi |
| LM | 15 | (Ivory Coast) Didier Lebri | | (substituted off) 60' |
| SS | 29 | (Tunisia) Fakhreddine Ben Youssef |
| CF | 17 | (Ivory Coast) Idrissa Kouyaté | | (substituted off) 87' |
Substitutions:
| MF | 7 | (Tunisia) Rebai Wassim Kamoun | | (substituted on) 60' |
| MF | 14 | (Tunisia) Ghazi Challouf | | (substituted on) 77' |
| FW | 11 | (Tunisia) Taha Yassine Khenissi | | (substituted on) 87' |
Manager:
(Netherlands) Ruud Krol

Assistant referees:
Zakhele Siwela (South Africa)
Marwa Range (Kenya)
Fourth official:
Victor Gomes (South Africa)
