= 2014 CAF Super Cup =

2014 Orange CAF Super Cup
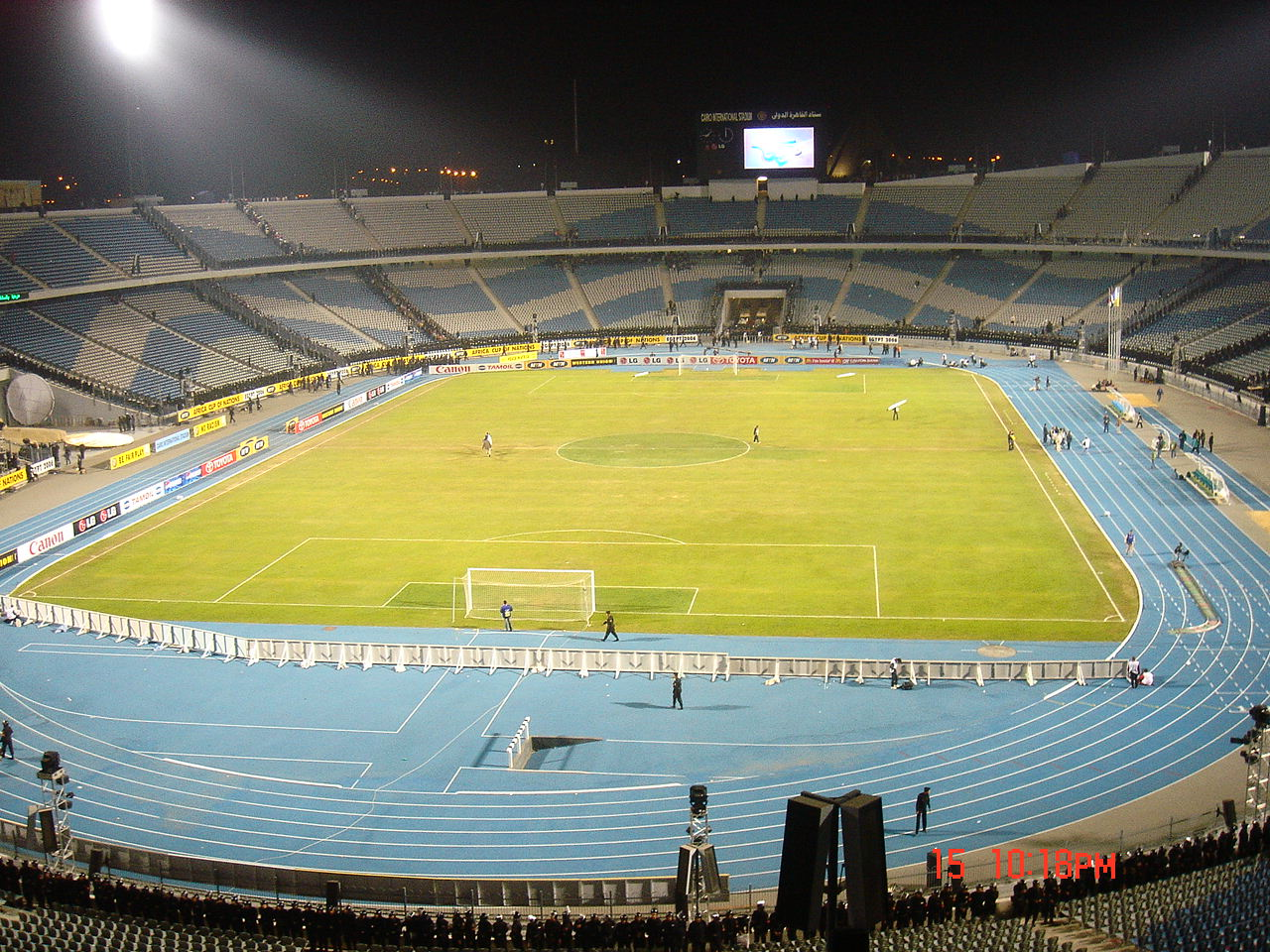
Al-Ahly	CS Sfaxien
(Egypt)	(Tunisia)
3	2
- Date: 20 February 2014
- Venue: Cairo International Stadium, Cairo
- Referee: Noumandiez Doué (Ivory Coast)
- Attendance: 45,000

The 2014 CAF Super Cup (also known as the 2014 Orange CAF Super Cup for sponsorship reasons) was the 22nd CAF Super Cup, an annual football match in Africa organized by the Confederation of African Football (CAF), between the winners of the previous season's two CAF club competitions, the CAF Champions League and the CAF Confederation Cup.

The match was played between Al-Ahly of Egypt, the 2013 CAF Champions League winner, and CS Sfaxien of Tunisia, the 2013 CAF Confederation Cup winner. It was hosted by Al-Ahly at the Cairo International Stadium in Cairo on 20 February 2014. The match was initially scheduled to be played at the Cairo International Stadium on 22 February 2014. Later, the CAF announced a change of venue and date, with the match scheduled to be played at the 30 June Stadium in Cairo on 20 February 2014. After the rejection of the 30 June Stadium to host the match, the CAF announced that the venue was moved back to the Cairo International Stadium.

Al-Ahly won the match 3–2 to claim their 6th CAF Super Cup.

== Teams ==
Team	Qualification	Previous participation (bold indicates winners)
(Egypt) Al-Ahly	2013 CAF Champions League winner	1994, **2002**, **2006**, **2007**, **2009**, **2013**
(Tunisia) CS Sfaxien	2013 CAF Confederation Cup winner	2008, 2009

== Rules ==
The CAF Super Cup was played as a single match, with the CAF Champions League winner hosting the match. If the score was tied at the end of regulation, a penalty shoot-out was used to determine the winner (no extra time was played).

== Match ==
20 February 2014
19:00 UTC+2

Al-Ahly (Egypt)	3–2	(Tunisia) CS Sfaxien
Gedo 23'; Gamal 55', 67'	Report	Maâloul 63' (pen.); Ben Youssef 77'

Cairo International Stadium, Cairo
Attendance: 45,000
Referee: Noumandiez Doué (Ivory Coast)

**Al-Ahly**	**CS Sfaxien**

GK	1	(Egypt) Sherif Ekramy
CB	3	(Egypt) Ramy Rabia
CB	6	(Egypt) Wael Gomaa (c)	(yellow card) 79'
CB	23	(Egypt) Mohamed Nagieb
RM	24	(Egypt) Ahmed Fathy
CM	25	(Egypt) Hossam Ashour	(yellow card) 87'
CM	8	(Egypt) Shehab El-Din Ahmed
LM	14	(Egypt) Sayed Moawad	(yellow card) 62'
AM	19	(Egypt) Abdallah El Said		(substituted off) 66'
CF	15	(Egypt) Gedo		(substituted off) 89'
CF	17	(Egypt) Amr Gamal	(yellow card) 27'	(substituted off) 80'
Substitutes:
GK	13	(Egypt) Ahmed Adel Abd El-Moneam
DF	12	(Egypt) Ahmad Shedid Qinawi
DF	20	(Egypt) Saad Samir		(substituted on) 73'
MF	28	(Burkina Faso) Moussa Yedan		(substituted on) 66'
FW	9	(Egypt) Emad Moteab
FW	27	(Egypt) Trézéguet		(substituted on) 80'
FW	30	(Egypt) Ahmed Raouf
Manager:
(Egypt) Mohamed Youssef

GK	28	(Tunisia) Rami Jridi
RB	19	(Tunisia) Maher Hannachi
CB	26	(Tunisia) Bassem Boulaabi
CB	25	(Tunisia) Mahmoud Ben Salah
LB	10	(Tunisia) Ali Maâloul (c)
DM	7	(Tunisia) Rebai Wassim Kamoun	(substituted off) 82'
RM	15	(Tunisia) Hamza Chotbri	(substituted off) 60'
LM	13	(Tunisia) Ferjani Sassi
AM	12	(Tunisia) Mohamed Ali Moncer	(substituted off) 64'
CF	29	(Tunisia) Fakhreddine Ben Youssef
CF	17	(Ivory Coast) Idrissa Kouyaté
Substitutions:
GK	1	(Tunisia) Mohamed Hedi Gaaloul
DF	5	(Tunisia) Oussama Elhasini
DF	21	(Tunisia) Zied Derbali
MF	14	(Tunisia) Ghazi Challouf	(substituted on) 60'
MF	18	(Tunisia) Wajdi Bouazzi	(substituted on) 82'
FW	11	(Tunisia) Taha Yassine Khenissi	(substituted on) 64'
FW	30	(Tunisia) Imed Louati
Manager:
(Tunisia) Hamadi Daw

Assistant referees:
Songuifolo Yeo (Ivory Coast)
Jean-Claude Birumushahu (Burundi)
Fourth official:
Bienvenue Sinko (Ivory Coast)
