= 2013–14 Al Ahly SC season =

2013–14 season
- Chairman: Hassan Hamdy succeeded by Mahmoud Taher
- Manager: Mohamed Youssef succeeded by Fathi Mabrouk, as an interim manager
- 2013/14 Egyptian League: Champion
- 2013 Egypt Cup: withdrew
- 2014 Egypt Cup: Semi-final
- 2013 Egyptian Super Cup: Not Held
- 2013 CAF Champions League: Champion
- 2013 FIFA Club World Cup: 6th
- 2014 CAF Super Cup: Champion
- 2014 CAF Champions League: Round of 16 (eliminated to participate in 2014 CAF Confederation Cup)
- 2014 CAF Confederation Cup: Leading Group B (ongoing in next season)
Home colours	Away colours	Home (alt) colours

The 2013-2014 season of the Al Ahly football club.

== 2013 CAF Champions league ==
=== Group stage ===
==== Group A ====
Pos	Team	Pld	W	D	L	GF	GA	GD	Pts	Qualification
1	(Egypt) Al-Ahly	6	3	2	1	8	7	+1	11	Advance to knockout stage
2	(South Africa) Orlando Pirates	6	2	2	2	8	4	+4	8	Advance to knockout stage
3	(Egypt) Zamalek	6	2	1	3	10	12	−2	7 (Note: Zamalek are ranked ahead of AC Léopards on head-to-head record).)	
4	(Republic of the Congo) AC Léopards	6	2	1	3	4	7	−3	7	

Source: CAF
Notes:

24 July 2013	Zamalek (Egypt)	1–1	(Egypt) Al-Ahly	El Gouna Stadium, El Gouna
16:30 UTC+2	Gaafar 8'	Report	Aboutrika 54' (pen.)	Referee: Djamel Haimoudi (Algeria)
Note: The Zamalek v Al-Ahly match was postponed due to security concerns in Egypt.

4 August 2013	Al-Ahly (Egypt)	0–3	(South Africa) Orlando Pirates	El Gouna Stadium, El Gouna
16:30 UTC+2		Report	Ntshumayelo 12'; Jali 73' (pen.); Myeni 76'	Referee: Mohamed Benouza (Algeria)

17 August 2013	AC Léopards (Republic of the Congo)	0–1	(Egypt) Al-Ahly	Stade Denis Sassou Nguesso, Dolisie
14:30 UTC+1		Report	Soliman 41'	Referee: Bernard Camille (Seychelles)

31 August 2013	Al-Ahly (Egypt)	2–1	(Republic of the Congo) AC Léopards	El Gouna Stadium, El Gouna
16:00 UTC+2	El-Said 37'; Soliman 68'	Report	Beaullia 84'	Referee: Badara Diatta (Senegal)

15 September 2013	Al-Ahly (Egypt)	4–2	(Egypt) Zamalek	El Gouna Stadium, El Gouna
15:00 UTC+2	Soliman 9'; Abd El-Zaher 15'; Aboutrika 52'; Ahmed Fathy 71'	Report	Gaber 4'; Hassan 82'	Attendance: 0 Referee: Néant Alioum (Cameroon)
Note: No fans attended the match for CAF decision against Al-Ahly, the Home Team.

22 September 2013	Orlando Pirates (South Africa)	0–0	(Egypt) Al-Ahly	Orlando Stadium, Johannesburg
15:00 UTC+2		Report		Referee: Koman Coulibaly (Mali)

=== Semifinals ===
Team 1	Agg.	Team 2	1st leg	2nd leg
Coton Sport (Cameroon)	2–2 (6–7p)	(Egypt) Al-Ahly	1–1	1–1

6 October 2013	Coton Sport (Cameroon)	1–1	(Egypt) Al-Ahly	Roumdé Adjia Stadium, Garoua
15:00 UTC+1	Mbongo 33'	Report	Aboutrika 45+3'	Referee: Janny Sikazwe (Zambia)
Note: The first leg was originally played on 5 October 2013, 15:00 UTC+1, but was abandoned with the score 0–0 in the 65th minute due to a waterlogged pitch. The match was replayed the next day in its entirety according to the competition regulations.

20 October 2013	Al-Ahly (Egypt)	1–1 (7–6 p)	(Cameroon) Coton Sport	El Gouna Stadium, El Gouna
14:30 UTC+2	El-Said 3'	Report	Yougouda 65'	Attendance: 0 Referee: Rajindraparsad Seechurn (Mauritius)
	Penalties
	Aboutrika (penalty missed); Soliman (penalty scored); Gomaa (penalty scored); Ahmed (penalty scored); Moawad (penalty scored); Trzeguet (penalty scored); Nagieb (penalty scored); Fathy (penalty scored)		(penalty scored) Oyongo; (penalty scored) Bouba; (penalty missed) Yougouda; (penalty scored) Manga Mbah; (penalty scored) Kingue Mpondo; (penalty scored) Ngamaleu; (penalty scored) Zimbori; (penalty missed) Haman
Note: No fans attended the match for CAF decision against Al-Ahly, the Home Team.

2–2 on aggregate. Al-Ahly won the penalty shoot-out and advanced to the final.

=== Final ===
Team 1	Agg.	Team 2	1st leg	2nd leg
Orlando Pirates (South Africa)	1–3	(Egypt) Al-Ahly	1–1	0–2

2 November 2013	Orlando Pirates (South Africa)	1–1	(Egypt) Al-Ahly	Orlando Stadium, Johannesburg
20:30 UTC+2	Matlaba 90+3'	Report	Aboutrika 14'	Referee: Djamel Haimoudi (Algeria)

10 November 2013	Al-Ahly (Egypt)	2–0	(South Africa) Orlando Pirates	Arab Contractors Stadium, Cairo
18:00 UTC+2	Aboutrika 54'; Abd El-Zaher 78'	Report		Referee: Bakary Gassama (Gambia)

2013 CAF Champions League winners
(Egypt)
Al-Ahly
Eighth title

== FIFA Club World Cup ==
Play-off for quarter-finals
11 December – Agadir
(Morocco) Raja Casablanca	2
(New Zealand) Auckland City	1

Quarter-finals
14 December – Agadir
(China) Guangzhou Evergrande	2
(Egypt) Al Ahly	0
14 December – Agadir
(Morocco) Raja Casablanca (a.e.t.)	2
(Mexico) Monterrey	1

Semi-finals
17 December – Agadir
(China) Guangzhou Evergrande	0
(Germany) Bayern Munich	3
18 December – Marrakesh
(Morocco) Raja Casablanca	3
(Brazil) Atlético Mineiro	1
Match for fifth place
18 December – Marrakesh
(Egypt) Al Ahly	1
(Mexico) Monterrey	5

Final
21 December – Marrakesh
(Germany) Bayern Munich	2
(Morocco) Raja Casablanca	0
Match for third place
21 December – Marrakesh
(China) Guangzhou Evergrande	2
(Brazil) Atlético Mineiro	3

All times Western European Time (UTC±0).

=== Quarter-finals ===
14 December 2013	Guangzhou Evergrande (China)	2–0	(Egypt) Al-Ahly	Stade Adrar, Agadir
16:00	Elkeson 49'; Conca 67'	Report		Attendance: 34,579; Referee: Sandro Ricci (Brazil)

=== Fifth-place match ===
18 December 2013	Al-Ahly (Egypt)	1–5	(Mexico) Monterrey	Stade de Marrakech, Marrakesh
16:30	Moteab 8'	Report	Cardozo 3'; Delgado 22', 65'; López 27'; Suazo 45' (pen.)	Attendance: 35,219; Referee: Mark Geiger (United States)

== Egyptian Premier League ==
=== Group 1 ===
Pos	Team	Pld	W	D	L	GF	GA	GD	Pts	Qualification or relegation
1	Al Ahly (Q)	20	12	4	4	30	10	+20	40	Qualification to Championship play-off
2	Smouha (Q)	20	10	5	5	24	20	+4	35	Qualification to Championship play-off
3	Al Ittihad	20	7	10	3	20	17	+3	31	
4	Al Mokawloon	20	7	9	4	27	17	+10	30	
5	El Gouna	20	7	5	8	17	16	+1	26	

Source: Soccerway
Rules for classification: 1) Points; 2) Goal difference; 3) Goals scored.
(Q) Qualified to the phase indicated

26 December 2013	El Entag El Harby	0 – 2	Al-Ahly	El Salam Stadium, Cairo
17:00 UTC+02:00		Report	Abdallah 69' (p); Gamal 83'	Attendance: 0

4 January 2014	Smouha	0 – 2	Al-Ahly	El Max Stadium, Alexandria
17:00 UTC+02:00		Report	Abdallah 13' 52'	Attendance: 0

9 January 2014	Al-Ahly	1 – 0	Enppi	Cairo International Stadium, Cairo
17:00 UTC+02:00	Mano 67' (o.g.)	Report		Attendance: 0

18 January 2014	El Ragaa	0 – 3	Al-Ahly	El Max Stadium, Alexandria
17:00 UTC+02:00		Report	Fathy 37'; Gamal 60'; Hamdy 70'	Attendance: 0

30 January 2014	Al Mokawloon Al Arab	2 – 1	Al-Ahly	Othman Ahmed Othman Stadium, Cairo
17:00 UTC+02:00	Farouk 4'; Adel 57'	Report	Gamal 16'	Attendance: 0

3 February 2014	Al-Ahly	0 – 1	El Dakhleya	Cairo International Stadium, Cairo
17:00 UTC+02:00		Report	Temsah 19'	Attendance: 0

6 February 2014	Al-Ahly	1 – 0	Ghazl El Mahalla	Cairo International Stadium, Cairo
17:00 UTC+02:00	Abdallah 66' (p)	Report		Attendance: 0

11 February 2014	Al-Ahly	0 – 0	Al Ittihad Al Sakandary	Cairo International Stadium, Cairo
17:00 UTC+02:00		Report		Attendance: 0

15 February 2014	El Gouna	1 – 0	Al-Ahly	El Gouna Stadium, El-Gouna
14:30 UTC+02:00	Sherif 52'	Report		Attendance: 0

13 March 2014	Al-Ahly	3 – 1	El Entag El Harby	Cairo International Stadium, Cairo
17:30 UTC+02:00	Gamal 25'; Yedan 52'; Hamdy 78'	Report	Bassem 7'	Attendance: 0

17 March 2014	El Dakhleya	1 – 0	Al-Ahly	30 June Stadium, Cairo
19:00 UTC+02:00	Koné 32'	Report		Attendance: 0

2 April 2014	Enppi	1 – 1	Al-Ahly	30 June Stadium, Cairo
18:00 UTC+02:00	Die Foneye 23'	Report	Abdallah 28' (p)	Attendance: 0

6 April 2014	Al-Ahly	4 – 1	Misr El Makasa	Cairo International Stadium, Cairo
18:00 UTC+02:00	Gamal 46'; Abdallah 66' 67'; Trezeguet 89'	Report	Hussein 89'	Attendance: 0

10 April 2014	Al-Ahly	3 – 0	El Ragaa	Cairo International Stadium, Cairo
18:00 UTC+02:00	Abdallah 76'; Gamal 83'; Fathy 93'	Report		Attendance: 0

15 April 2014	Al-Ahly	1 – 0	Al Mokawloon Al Arab	Cairo International Stadium, Cairo
18:00 UTC+02:00	Rabia 87'	Report		Attendance: 0

3 May 2014	Al-Ahly	1 – 1	Smouha	Cairo International Stadium, Cairo
19:00 UTC+02:00	Abdallah 72'	Report	Hamoudy 36'	Attendance: 0

7 May 2014	Al Ittihad Al Sakandary	0 – 2	Al-Ahly	Alexandria Stadium, Alexandria
19:00 UTC+02:00	Gamal 11' 74'	Report		Attendance: 0

11 May 2014	Ghazl El Mahalla	1 – 1	Al-Ahly	Alexandria Stadium, Alexandria
16:00 UTC+02:00	Arafat 30'	Report	Trezeguet 74'	Attendance: 0

12 June 2014	Al-Ahly	1 – 0	El Gouna	Cairo International Stadium, Cairo
18:00 UTC+03:00	Hamdy 49'	Report		Attendance: 0

16 June 2014	Misr El Makasa	0 – 3	Al-Ahly	30 June Stadium, Cairo
16:15 UTC+03:00	Saad 24' (p); Raouf 36' (p); Ramadan 58'	Report		Attendance: 0

=== Championship play-off ===
Pos	Team	Pld	W	D	L	GF	GA	GD	Pts	Qualification or relegation
1	Al Ahly (C)	3	2	1	0	5	0	+5	7	Qualification to Champions League
2	Smouha	3	2	1	0	6	2	+4	7	Qualification to Champions League
3	Zamalek	3	1	0	2	3	3	0	3	Qualification to Confederation Cup (Note: Since the winners of the 2014 Egypt Cup, Zamalek, qualified for African competition based on league position, the spot awarded to the Cup winner (Confederation Cup) was passed to the fourth-placed team which were the next best teams in the table not already qualified for any African competition.)
4	Petrojet	3	0	0	3	1	10	−9	0	Qualification to Confederation Cup

Source: Soccerway
Rules for classification: 1) Points; 2) Goal difference; 3) Goals scored.
(C) Champion
Notes:

28 June 2014	Al-Ahly	1 – 0	Zamalek	Cairo International Stadium, Cairo
20:30 UTC+03:00	Tawfik 21' (o.g.)	Report		Attendance: 0

2 July 2014	Petrojet	0 – 4	Al-Ahly	Alexandria Stadium, Alexandria
21:30 UTC+03:00		Report	Ramadan 53' 68'; Gamal 58'; Raouf 84'	Attendance: 0

7 July 2014	Al-Ahly	0 – 0	Smouha	Cairo International Stadium, Cairo
21:30 UTC+03:00		Report		Attendance: 0

2013–14 Egyptian Premier League
(Egypt)
Al-Ahly
Thirty Seventh title

== 2014 CAF Super Cup ==
20 February 2014	Al-Ahly (Egypt)	3–2	(Tunisia) CS Sfaxien	Cairo International Stadium, Cairo
19:00 UTC+2	Gedo 23'; Gamal 55', 67'	Report	Maâloul 63' (pen.); Ben Youssef 77'	Attendance: 30,000; Referee: Noumandiez Doué (Ivory Coast)

2014 CAF Super Cup winners
(Egypt)
Al-Ahly
Sixth title

== 2014 CAF Champions League ==
=== Round of 32 ===
Team 1	Agg.	Team 2	1st leg	2nd leg
Young Africans (Tanzania)	1–1 (3–4p)	(Egypt) Al-Ahly	1–0	0–1

1 March 2014	Young Africans (Tanzania)	1–0	(Egypt) Al-Ahly	Benjamin Mkapa National Stadium, Dar-es-Salaam
16:00 UTC+3	Haroub 83'			Referee: Bazezew Belete (Ethiopia)

9 March 2014	Al-Ahly (Egypt)	1–0 (4–3 p)	(Tanzania) Young Africans	El Max Stadium, Alexandria
19:00 UTC+2	Moawad 71'			Attendance: 0 Referee: Badara Diatta (Senegal)

1–1 on aggregate. Al-Ahly won the penalty shoot-out and advanced to the second round.

=== Round of 16 ===
Team 1	Agg.	Team 2	1st leg	2nd leg
Al-Ahly SC (Benghazi) (Libya)	4–2	(Egypt) Al-Ahly	1–0	3–2

21 March 2014	Al-Ahly Benghazi (Libya)	1–0	(Egypt) Al-Ahly	Stade Chedli Zouiten, Tunis (Tunisia)
14:00 UTC+1	Sadomba 68'			Referee: Bouchaïb El Ahrach (Morocco)
Note: The first leg was played outside of Libya due to security concerns.

29 March 2014	Al-Ahly (Egypt)	2–3	(Libya) Al-Ahly Benghazi	30 June Stadium, Cairo
19:00 UTC+2	Nagieb 38'; Gamal 75'		Fetori 40' (pen.); Farag 52'; Al Mehdi 60'	Attendance: 0 Referee: Daniel Bennett (South Africa)

Al-Ahly Benghazi won 4–2 on aggregate and advanced to the group stage. Al-Ahly entered the play-off round.

== 2014 CAF Confederation Cup ==
=== Play-off Round ===
Team 1	Agg.	Team 2	1st leg	2nd leg
Al-Ahly (Egypt)	2–2 (a)	(Morocco) Difaâ El Jadidi	1–0	2–1

20 April 2014	Al-Ahly (Egypt)	1–0	(Morocco) Difaâ El Jadidi	30 June Stadium, Cairo
19:00 UTC+2	Abdallah 21'			Attendance: 0 Referee: Eric Otogo-Castane (Gabon)

26 April 2014	Difaâ El Jadidi (Morocco)	2–1	(Egypt) Al-Ahly	Stade El Abdi, El Jadida
16:00 UTC+1	Chagou 62' (pen.); Lengoualama 78'		Raouf 90+5'	Referee: Med Said Kordi (Tunisia)

2–2 on aggregate. Al-Ahly won on the away goals rule and advanced to the group stage.

=== Group stage ===
==== Group B ====
Team	Pld	W	D	L	GF	GA	GD	Pts	AHL	SEW	NKA	ESS
(Egypt) Al-Ahly	6	2	3	1	5	3	+2	9 (Note: Tiebreakers: Al-Ahly and Séwé Sport are ranked on head-to-head record.)		1–0	2–0	0–0
(Ivory Coast) Séwé Sport	6	2	3	1	7	4	+3	9	1–1		3–0	1–1
(Zambia) Nkana	6	2	1	3	9	13	−4	7	1–0	1–1		4–3
(Tunisia) Étoile du Sahel	6	1	3	2	9	10	−1	6	1–1	0–1	4–3	

Legend: Blue = home team win; Yellow = draw; Red = away team win.
Notes:

17 May 2014	Al-Ahly (Egypt)	2–0	(Zambia) Nkana	Petro Sport Stadium, Cairo
20:00 UTC+3	Gamal 46'; Gedo 56'	Report		Attendance: 0 Referee: Djamel Haimoudi (Algeria)

25 May 2014	Étoile du Sahel (Tunisia)	1–1	(Egypt) Al-Ahly	Stade Olympique de Sousse, Sousse
18:00 UTC+1	Bounedjah 39'	Report	Gamal 59'	Referee: Sylvester Kirwa (Kenya)

8 June 2014	Séwé Sport (Ivory Coast)	1–1	(Egypt) Al-Ahly	Stade Robert Champroux, Abidjan
15:30 UTC±0	Akrofi 78'		Yedan 45'	Referee: Juste Ephrem Zio (Burkina Faso)

Note: Al Ahly's season end in beginning of July, so the rest of the 2014 CAF Confederation Cup group stage matches will be included in the next season, as the competition will be resumed by the end of July, after the end of 2014 FIFA World Cup

== 2014 Egypt Cup ==
=== Round of 16 ===
22 June 2014	Al Ahly	4 – 3	El Menia	Cairo International Stadium, Cairo
17:00 UTC+03:00	Hamdy 26'; Gamal 55' 90+2'; Bambo 63'		Atef 31'; Qaoud 82' 90'	Attendance: 0

=== Quarter-final ===
11 July 2014	Al Ahly	1 – 0	El Ragaa	Cairo International Stadium, Cairo
21:30 UTC+03:00	Moteab 60'			Attendance: 0

=== Semi-final ===
11 July 2014	Al Ahly	1 – 2	Smouha	Cairo International Stadium, Cairo
21:30 UTC+03:00	Moteab 81'		Hamoudi 25' 34'	Attendance: 0
