= 2013 CAF Confederation Cup group stage =

- Dates: 19 July – 22 September 2013

Tournament statistics
- Matches played: 24
- Goals scored: 40 (1.67 per match)

The group stage of the 2013 CAF Confederation Cup was played from 19 July to 22 September 2013. A total of eight teams competed in the group stage.

== Draw ==
The draw for the group stage was held on 14 May 2013, 14:00 UTC+2, at the CAF Headquarters in Cairo, Egypt. The eight winners of the play-off round were drawn into two groups of four. There were no seeding.

The following eight teams were entered into the draw (their identity was not known at the time of the draw as it was held before the play-off round was played):

- (Democratic Republic of the Congo) TP Mazembe
- (Tunisia) CS Sfaxien
- (Mali) Stade Malien
- (Morocco) FUS Rabat
- (Tunisia) CA Bizertin
- (Algeria) ES Sétif
- (Tunisia) Étoile du Sahel
- (Ethiopia) Saint George

== Format ==
In the group stage, each group was played on a home-and-away round-robin basis. The winners and runners-up of each group advanced to the semi-finals.

=== Tiebreakers ===
The teams are ranked according to points (3 points for a win, 1 point for a tie, 0 points for a loss). If tied on points, tiebreakers are applied in the following order:

1. Number of points obtained in games between the teams concerned
2. Goal difference in games between the teams concerned
3. Away goals scored in games between the teams concerned
4. Goal difference in all games
5. Goals scored in all games

== Groups ==
The matchdays were 19–21 July, 2–4 August, 16–18 August, 30 August–1 September, 13–15 September, and 20–22 September 2013.

=== Group A ===
Team	Pld	W	D	L	GF	GA	GD	Pts	CSS	SM	ESS	SG
(Tunisia) CS Sfaxien	6	4	2	0	8	3	+5	14		0–0	1–0	1–0
(Mali) Stade Malien	6	2	2	2	3	4	−1	8	1–2		0–0	1–0
(Tunisia) Étoile du Sahel	6	1	3	2	3	4	−1	6	1–1	0–1		2–1
(Ethiopia) Saint George	6	1	1	4	4	7	−3	4	1–3	2–0	0–0	

Legend: Blue = home team win; Yellow = draw; Red = away team win.
21 July 2013
16:00 UTC+3

Saint George (Ethiopia)	2–0	(Mali) Stade Malien
Oumed 16'; Fitsum 84'	Report

Addis Ababa Stadium, Addis Ababa
Referee: Badara Diatta (Senegal)
21 July 2013
22:00 UTC+1

CS Sfaxien (Tunisia)	1–0	(Tunisia) Étoile du Sahel
Kouyaté 18'	Report

Stade Taïeb Mhiri, Sfax
Referee: Noumandiez Doué (Ivory Coast)

3 August 2013
22:00 UTC+1

Étoile du Sahel (Tunisia)	2–1	(Ethiopia) Saint George
Jebali 27'; Bounedjah 71'	Report	Nafkha 17' (o.g.)

Stade Olympique de Sousse, Sousse
Referee: Davies Omweno (Kenya)
4 August 2013
16:30 UTC±0

Stade Malien (Mali)	1–2	(Tunisia) CS Sfaxien
Cissoko 45+1'	Report	Kouyaté 47'; Ben Youssef 78'

Stade Modibo Kéïta, Bamako
Referee: Daniel Bennett (South Africa)

17 August 2013
16:00 UTC±0

Stade Malien (Mali)	0–0	(Tunisia) Étoile du Sahel
	Report

Stade Modibo Kéïta, Bamako
Referee: Sylvester Kirwa (Kenya)
18 August 2013
16:00 UTC+3

Saint George (Ethiopia)	1–3	(Tunisia) CS Sfaxien
Oumed 66'	Report	Kouyaté 10'; Maâloul 24' (pen.); Hannachi 28'

Addis Ababa Stadium, Addis Ababa
Referee: Rédouane Jiyed (Morocco)

31 August 2013
19:00 UTC+1

Étoile du Sahel (Tunisia)	0–1	(Mali) Stade Malien
	Report	Diawara 81'

Stade Olympique de Sousse, Sousse
Referee: Janny Sikazwe (Zambia)
1 September 2013
16:00 UTC+1

CS Sfaxien (Tunisia)	1–0	(Ethiopia) Saint George
Ben Youssef 68'	Report

Stade El Menzah, Tunis
Referee: Eric Otogo-Castane (Gabon)

14 September 2013
19:00 UTC+1

Étoile du Sahel (Tunisia)	1–1	(Tunisia) CS Sfaxien
Jebali 40'	Report	Ben Youssef 45+2'

Stade Olympique de Sousse, Sousse
Referee: Mehdi Abid Charef (Algeria)
15 September 2013
16:00 UTC±0

Stade Malien (Mali)	1–0	(Ethiopia) Saint George
Diawara 82'	Report

Stade Modibo Kéïta, Bamako
Referee: Mohamed Farouk Mahmoud (Egypt)

22 September 2013
14:00 UTC+1

CS Sfaxien (Tunisia)	0–0	(Mali) Stade Malien
	Report

Stade El Menzah, Tunis
Referee: Bouchaïb El Ahrach (Morocco)
22 September 2013
16:00 UTC+3

Saint George (Ethiopia)	0–0	(Tunisia) Étoile du Sahel
	Report

Addis Ababa Stadium, Addis Ababa
Referee: Juste Ephrem Zio (Burkina Faso)

=== Group B ===
Team	Pld	W	D	L	GF	GA	GD	Pts	TPM	CAB	FUS	ESS
(Democratic Republic of the Congo) TP Mazembe	6	3	1	2	9	6	+3	10		1–0	3–0	4–2
(Tunisia) CA Bizertin	6	2	2	2	3	3	0	8 (Note: Tiebreakers: CA Bizertin are ranked ahead of FUS Rabat on head-to-head record.)	1–0		1–0	0–0
(Morocco) FUS Rabat	6	2	2	2	5	6	−1	8	2–0	1–1		1–0
(Algeria) ES Sétif	6	1	3	2	5	7	−2	6	1–1	1–0	1–1	

Legend: Blue = home team win; Yellow = draw; Red = away team win.
Notes:

Tiebreakers
Team	Pld	W	D	L	GF	GA	GD	Pts
(Tunisia) CA Bizertin	2	1	1	0	2	1	+1	4
(Morocco) FUS Rabat	2	0	1	1	1	2	−1	1

19 July 2013
22:00 UTC+1

ES Sétif (Algeria)	1–1	(Democratic Republic of the Congo) TP Mazembe
Delhoum 82'	Report	Samatta 81'

Stade 8 Mai 1945, Sétif
Referee: Bakary Gassama (Gambia)
20 July 2013
22:00 UTC±0

FUS Rabat (Morocco)	1–1	(Tunisia) CA Bizertin
Feddal 84'	Report	Rjaïbi 74'

Prince Moulay Abdellah Stadium, Rabat
Referee: Eric Otogo-Castane (Gabon)

3 August 2013
15:00 UTC+2

TP Mazembe (Democratic Republic of the Congo)	3–0	(Morocco) FUS Rabat
Asante 6'; Samatta 12'; Traoré 55'	Report

Stade TP Mazembe, Lubumbashi
Referee: Koman Coulibaly (Mali)
4 August 2013
22:00 UTC+1

CA Bizertin (Tunisia)	0–0	(Algeria) ES Sétif
	Report

Stade Chedli Zouiten, Tunis
Referee: Ali Lemghaifry (Mauritania)

16 August 2013
19:00 UTC+1

CA Bizertin (Tunisia)	1–0	(Democratic Republic of the Congo) TP Mazembe
Salhi 87'	Report

Stade 15 Octobre, Bizerte
Referee: Aboubacar Mario Bangoura (Guinea)
18 August 2013
19:00 UTC+1

FUS Rabat (Morocco)	1–0	(Algeria) ES Sétif
Batna 34'	Report

Prince Moulay Abdellah Stadium, Rabat
Referee: Hudu Munyemana (Rwanda)

30 August 2013
20:30 UTC+1

ES Sétif (Algeria)	1–1	(Morocco) FUS Rabat
Gourmi 14' (pen.)	Report	El Bahri 77'

Stade 8 Mai 1945, Sétif
Referee: Néant Alioum (Cameroon)
1 September 2013
15:30 UTC+2

TP Mazembe (Democratic Republic of the Congo)	1–0	(Tunisia) CA Bizertin
Kalaba 85'	Report

Stade TP Mazembe, Lubumbashi
Referee: Rajindraparsad Seechurn (Mauritius)

14 September 2013
15:30 UTC+2

TP Mazembe (Democratic Republic of the Congo)	4–2	(Algeria) ES Sétif
Ulimwengu 4', 27'; Mputu 16'; Samatta 63'	Report	Ziti 5'; Gourmi 72'

Stade TP Mazembe, Lubumbashi
Referee: Gehad Grisha (Egypt)
15 September 2013
16:00 UTC+1

CA Bizertin (Tunisia)	1–0	(Morocco) FUS Rabat
Machani 90'	Report

Stade 15 Octobre, Bizerte
Referee: Rainhold Shikongo (Namibia)

21 September 2013
19:00 UTC+1

ES Sétif (Algeria)	1–0	(Tunisia) CA Bizertin
Boukria 85'	Report

Stade 8 Mai 1945, Sétif
Referee: Khalid Abdel Rahman (Sudan)
21 September 2013
19:00 UTC+1

FUS Rabat (Morocco)	2–0	(Democratic Republic of the Congo) TP Mazembe
Halfi 38'; El Araoui 53'	Report

Prince Moulay Abdellah Stadium, Rabat
Referee: William Agbovi (Ghana)
