= 2014 CAF Confederation Cup final =

- Event: 2014 CAF Confederation Cup
Séwé Sport	Al-Ahly
(Ivory Coast)	(Egypt)
2	2
- on aggregate Al-Ahly won on away goals.

First leg
Séwé Sport	Al-Ahly
2	1
- Date: 29 November 2014
- Venue: Stade Robert Champroux, Abidjan
- Referee: Eric Otogo-Castane (Gabon)
- Attendance: 5,000

Second leg
Al-Ahly	Séwé Sport
1	0
- Date: 6 December 2014
- Venue: Cairo International Stadium, Cairo
- Referee: Rajindraparsad Seechurn (Mauritius)
- Attendance: 55,000

The 2014 CAF Confederation Cup final was the final of the 2014 CAF Confederation Cup, the 11th edition of the CAF Confederation Cup, Africa's secondary club football competition organized by the Confederation of African Football (CAF).

The final was contested in two-legged home-and-away format between Séwé Sport of Côte d'Ivoire and Al-Ahly of Egypt. The first leg was hosted by Séwé Sport at the Stade Robert Champroux in Abidjan on 29 November 2014, while the second leg was hosted by Al-Ahly at the Cairo International Stadium in Cairo on 6 December 2014. The winner earned the right to play in the 2015 CAF Super Cup against the winner of the 2014 CAF Champions League.

After losing the first leg 2–1, Al-Ahly won the second leg 1–0 on Emad Moteab's second half injury-time goal, giving them the title on the away goals rule (2–2 on aggregate).

== Background ==
This was the first African final for Séwé Sport. They were also the first Ivorian side to reach a CAF Confederation Cup final, and the first Ivorian side to reach the final of a major African club championship since 1995.

While Al-Ahly had reached the finals of the African Champions Cup/CAF Champions League ten times and the African Cup Winners' Cup four times respectively, this was their first final in the CAF Confederation Cup. They were also the first Egyptian side to reach a CAF Confederation Cup final and the second after Ismaily in overall CAF cup finals, and had the chance to become the first club to win the CAF Champions League and the CAF Confederation Cup titles in consecutive years after winning the 2013 CAF Champions League Final.

After both teams lost in the 2014 CAF Champions League second round, they entered the Confederation Cup play-off round, and advanced to the group stage, where they were both drawn into Group B. In their head-to-head meetings, the home match of Séwé Sport finished in a 1–1 draw, while Al-Ahly won their home match 1–0. Both teams finished with nine points, and Al-Ahly won the group over Séwé Sport on head-to-head record.

== Road to final ==
Note: In all results below, the score of the finalist is given first (H: home; A: away).

(Ivory Coast) Séwé Sport				Round	(Egypt) Al-Ahly			
Champions League
Opponent	Agg.	1st leg	2nd leg	Qualifying rounds	Opponent	Agg.	1st leg	2nd leg
(Guinea-Bissau) Os Balantas	w/o	— (H)	— (A)	Preliminary round	Bye			
(Liberia) Barrack Young Controllers	4–3	3–3 (A)	1–0 (H)	First round	(Tanzania) Young Africans	1–1 (4–3 p)	0–1 (A)	1–0 (H)
(Democratic Republic of the Congo) TP Mazembe	2–2 (a)	2–1 (H)	0–1 (A)	Second round	(Libya) Al-Ahly Benghazi	2–4	0–1 (A)	2–3 (H)
Confederation Cup
(Nigeria) Bayelsa United	3–0	2–0 (H)	1–0 (A)	Play-off round	(Morocco) Difaâ El Jadidi	2–2 (a)	1–0 (H)	1–2 (A)
Opponent	Result			Group stage	Opponent	Result		
(Tunisia) Étoile du Sahel	1–1 (H)			Matchday 1	(Zambia) Nkana	2–0 (H)		
(Zambia) Nkana	1–1 (A)			Matchday 2	(Tunisia) Étoile du Sahel	1–1 (A)		
(Egypt) Al-Ahly	1–1 (H)			Matchday 3	(Ivory Coast) Séwé Sport	1–1 (A)		
(Egypt) Al-Ahly	0–1 (A)			Matchday 4	(Ivory Coast) Séwé Sport	1–0 (H)		
(Tunisia) Étoile du Sahel	1–0 (A)			Matchday 5	(Zambia) Nkana	0–1 (A)		
(Zambia) Nkana	3–0 (H)			Matchday 6	(Tunisia) Étoile du Sahel	0–0 (H)		
Group B runner-up: Team / Pld / W / D / L / GF / GA / GD / Pts; (Egypt) Al-Ahly / 6 / 2 / 3 / 1 / 5 / 3 / +2 / 9; (Ivory Coast) Séwé Sport / 6 / 2 / 3 / 1 / 7 / 4 / +3 / 9; (Zambia) Nkana / 6 / 2 / 1 / 3 / 9 / 13 / −4 / 7; (Tunisia) Étoile du Sahel / 6 / 1 / 3 / 2 / 9 / 10 / −1 / 6; Source:				Final standings	Group B winner: Team / Pld / W / D / L / GF / GA / GD / Pts; (Egypt) Al-Ahly / 6 / 2 / 3 / 1 / 5 / 3 / +2 / 9; (Ivory Coast) Séwé Sport / 6 / 2 / 3 / 1 / 7 / 4 / +3 / 9; (Zambia) Nkana / 6 / 2 / 1 / 3 / 9 / 13 / −4 / 7; (Tunisia) Étoile du Sahel / 6 / 1 / 3 / 2 / 9 / 10 / −1 / 6; Source:			
Opponent	Agg.	1st leg	2nd leg	Knock-out stage	Opponent	Agg.	1st leg	2nd leg
(Republic of the Congo) AC Léopards	1–0	1–0 (H)	0–0 (A)	Semifinals	(Cameroon) Coton Sport	3–1	1–0 (A)	2–1 (H)

== Rules ==
The final was played on a home-and-away two-legged basis. If the sides were level on aggregate after the second leg, the away goals rule was applied, and if still level, the tie proceeded directly to a penalty shoot-out (no extra time was played).

== Matches ==
=== First leg ===
29 November 2014
15:00 UTC±0

Séwé Sport (Ivory Coast)	2–1	(Egypt) Al-Ahly
Kouamé 25' (pen.); Assalé 82'	Report	Trezeguet 59'

Stade Robert Champroux, Abidjan
Attendance: 5,000
Referee: Eric Otogo-Castane (Gabon)

Séwé Sport	Al-Ahly

Assistant referees:
Theophile Vinga (Gabon)
Sylvain Alain Mouala (Gabon)
Fourth official:
Yves Roponat Mbourou (Gabon)

=== Second leg ===
6 December 2014
18:00 UTC+2

Al-Ahly (Egypt)	1–0	(Ivory Coast) Séwé Sport
Moteab 90+6'	Report

Cairo International Stadium, Cairo
Attendance: 55,000
Referee: Rajindraparsad Seechurn (Mauritius)

Al-Ahly	Séwé Sport

Assistant referees:
Balkrishna Bootun (Mauritius)
Vivian Vally (Mauritius)
Fourth official:
