= 2013 CAF Confederation Cup =

International football competition in Africa

2013 Orange CAF Confederation Cup

Tournament details
- Dates: 16 February – 30 November 2013
- Teams: 51+8 (from 41 associations)

Final positions
- Champions: (Tunisia) CS Sfaxien (3rd title)
- Runners-up: (Democratic Republic of the Congo) TP Mazembe

Tournament statistics
- Matches played: 129
- Goals scored: 300 (2.33 per match)
- Top scorer(s): (Ivory Coast) Vincent Die Foneye (Tanzania) Mbwana Samatta (Mozambique) Sonito (6 goals)

The 2013 CAF Confederation Cup (also known as the 2013 Orange CAF Confederation Cup for sponsorship reasons) was the 10th edition of the CAF Confederation Cup, Africa's secondary club football competition organized by the Confederation of African Football (CAF). The winner earned the right to play in the 2014 CAF Super Cup. The defending champions AC Léopards did not enter the tournament as they qualified for the 2013 CAF Champions League and reached the group stage.

In the final, CS Sfaxien of Tunisia defeated TP Mazembe of the Democratic Republic of the Congo, and were crowned CAF Confederation Cup champions for a record third time.

== Association team allocation ==
All 56 CAF member associations may enter the CAF Confederation Cup, with the 12 highest ranked associations according to their CAF 5-year ranking eligible to enter two teams in the competition. The title holders could also enter if they had not already qualified for the CAF Champions League or CAF Confederation Cup. As a result, theoretically a maximum of 69 teams could enter the tournament (plus eight teams eliminated from the CAF Champions League which entered the play-off round) – although this level has never been reached.

For the 2013 CAF Confederation Cup, the CAF used the 2007–2011 CAF 5-year ranking, which calculated points for each association based on their clubs’ performance over those 5 years in the CAF Champions League and CAF Confederation Cup. The criteria for points were the following:

	CAF Champions League	CAF Confederation Cup
Winner	5 points	4 points
Runner-up	4 points	3 points
Losing semi-finalists	3 points	2 points
3rd place in groups	2 points	1 point
4th place in groups	1 point	1 point

The points were multiplied by a coefficient according to the year as follows:

- 2011 – 5
- 2010 – 4
- 2009 – 3
- 2008 – 2
- 2007 – 1

== Teams ==
The following teams entered the competition. Teams in bold received a bye to the first round. The other teams entered the preliminary round.

Associations are shown according to their 2007–2011 CAF 5-year ranking – those with a ranking score have their rank and score indicated.

Association	Team	Qualifying method
Associations eligible to enter two teams (Ranked 1–12)
Tunisia (1st – 100 pts)	**CS Sfaxien**	2011–12 Tunisian Ligue Professionnelle 1 third place
Tunisia (1st – 100 pts)	**Étoile du Sahel**	2011–12 Tunisian Ligue Professionnelle 1 fourth place
Nigeria (2nd – 70 pts)	**Lobi Stars**	2012 Nigeria Premier League third place
Nigeria (2nd – 70 pts)	**Heartland**	2012 Nigerian FA Cup winner
Egypt (3rd – 64 pts)	**Ismaily**	2010–11 Egyptian Premier League third place
Egypt (3rd – 64 pts)	**ENPPI**	2011 Egypt Cup winner
Morocco (4th – 62 pts)	**Wydad AC**	2011–12 Botola third place
Morocco (4th – 62 pts)	**FAR Rabat**	2012 Coupe du Trône runner-up
(Democratic Republic of the Congo) Congo DR (5th – 49 pts)	**DC Motema Pembe**	2012 Linafoot third place
(Democratic Republic of the Congo) Congo DR (5th – 49 pts)	CS Don Bosco	2012 Coupe du Congo winner
Sudan (6th – 47 pts)	**Al-Ahly Shendi**	2012 Sudan Premier League third place
Sudan (6th – 47 pts)	Al-Khartoum	2012 Sudan Premier League fourth place
Algeria (7th – 43 pts)	**USM Alger** (one entrant only)	2011–12 Algerian Ligue Professionnelle 1 third place
Cameroon (8th – 19 pts)	Panthère du Ndé	2012 Cameroonian Premier League third place
Cameroon (8th – 19 pts)	Unisport Bafang	2012 Cameroonian Cup winner
Angola (9th – 18 pts)	**Petro de Luanda**	2012 Taça de Angola winner
Angola (9th – 18 pts)	Recreativo da Caála	2012 Taça de Angola runner-up
Mali (10th – 16 pts)	US Bougouni	2012 Malian Cup winner
Mali (10th – 16 pts)	Onze Créateurs	2012 Malian Cup runner-up
Ivory Coast (T-12th – 11 pts)	**ASEC Mimosas**	2012 Côte d'Ivoire Premier Division third place
Ivory Coast (T-12th – 11 pts)	Stella Club d'Adjamé	2012 Coupe de Côte d'Ivoire de football winner
Associations eligible to enter one team
Libya (T-12th – 11 pts)	Al-Nasr	2009–10 Libyan Cup winner
Zambia (14th – 10 pts)	Power Dynamos	2012 Zambian Premier League runner-up
Niger (15th – 4 pts)	Sahel	2012 Niger Cup winner
Ghana (16th – 2 pts)	New Edubiase United	2011–12 Ghanaian FA Cup winner
South Africa (17th – 1 pt)	SuperSport United	2012 Nedbank Cup winner
Benin	Mogas 90	2012 Benin Cup winner
Botswana	Gaborone United	2012 Botswana FA Challenge Cup winner
Burkina Faso	Rail Club du Kadiogo	2012 Coupe du Faso winner
Burundi	LLB Académic	2012 Burundian Cup winner
Central African Republic	Anges de Fatima	2012 Central African Republic Coupe Nationale finalist
Chad	Elect-Sport	2012 Coupe de Ligue de N'Djaména winner
(Republic of the Congo) Congo	Diables Noirs	2012 Coupe du Congo winner
Equatorial Guinea	The Panthers	2012 Equatoguinean Cup winner
Ethiopia	Dedebit	2011–12 Ethiopian Premier League runner-up
Gabon	US Bitam	2011–12 Gabon Championnat National D1 runner-up
(The Gambia) Gambia	Gamtel	2012 Gambian Cup winner
Guinea	Séquence	2012 Guinée Coupe Nationale winner
Kenya	Gor Mahia	2012 FKF President's Cup winner
Liberia	Barrack Young Controllers II	2012 Liberian Cup winner
Madagascar	TCO Boeny	2012 Coupe de Madagascar winner
Mozambique	Liga Muçulmana	2012 Taça de Moçambique winner
Rwanda	Police	2011–12 Primus National Football League runner-up
São Tomé and Príncipe	Desportivo de Guadalupe	2012 Taça Nacional de São Tomé e Príncipe runner-up
Senegal	HLM	2012 Senegal FA Cup winner
Seychelles	Anse Réunion	2012 Seychelles FA Cup winner
Sierra Leone	Johansen	2011–12 Sierra Leone National Premier League fourth place
South Sudan	El Nasir	2012 South Sudan National Cup winner
(Eswatini) Swaziland	Mbabane Highlanders	2012 Swazi Cup runner-up
Tanzania	Azam	2011–12 Tanzanian Premier League runner-up
Togo	AS Douanes Lomé	2011–12 Togolese Championnat National runner-up

Notes

1. Egypt (EGY): The 2011–12 Egyptian Premier League third place and the 2012 Egypt Cup winner would originally represent Egypt in this tournament, but due to their cancellation, the 2010–11 Egyptian Premier League third place and the 2011 Egypt Cup winner were selected to represent Egypt.
2. Libya (LBY): As there were no club football in Libya in 2012, the 2009–10 Libyan Cup winner (last completed season) was selected to represent Libya.

The following associations did not enter a team: Zimbabwe (11th – 13 pts), Cape Verde, Comoros, Djibouti, Eritrea, Guinea-Bissau, Lesotho, Malawi, Mauritania, Mauritius, Namibia, Réunion, Somalia, Uganda, Zanzibar.

Moreover, the eight losers of the 2013 CAF Champions League second round entered the play-off round.

- (Ethiopia) Saint George
- (Tunisia) CA Bizertin
- (Democratic Republic of the Congo) TP Mazembe
- (Nigeria) Enugu Rangers
- (Algeria) JSM Béjaïa
- (Morocco) FUS Rabat
- (Mali) Stade Malien
- (Algeria) ES Sétif

== Schedule ==
The schedule of the competition was as follows (all draws held at CAF headquarters in Cairo, Egypt).

Phase	Round	Draw date	First leg	Second leg
Qualifying	Preliminary round	9 December 2012	15–17 February 2013	1–3 March 2013
Qualifying	First round	9 December 2012	15–17 March 2013	5–7 April 2013
Qualifying	Second round	9 December 2012	19–21 April 2013	3–5 May 2013
Qualifying	Play-off round	7 May 2013	17–19 May 2013	31 May–2 June 2013
Group stage	Matchday 1	14 May 2013	19–21 July 2013	
Group stage	Matchday 2	14 May 2013	2–4 August 2013	
Group stage	Matchday 3	14 May 2013	16–18 August 2013	
Group stage	Matchday 4	14 May 2013	30 August–1 September 2013	
Group stage	Matchday 5	14 May 2013	13–15 September 2013	
Group stage	Matchday 6	14 May 2013	20–22 September 2013	
Knock-out stage	Semi-finals	14 May 2013	4–6 October 2013	18–20 October 2013
Knock-out stage	Final	14 May 2013	22–24 November 2013	29 November–1 December 2013

== Qualifying rounds ==
The draw for the preliminary, first and second qualifying rounds was held on 9 December 2012, and the fixtures were announced by the CAF on 10 December 2012.

Qualification ties were played on a home-and-away two-legged basis. If the sides were level on aggregate after the second leg, the away goals rule was applied, and if still level, the tie proceeded directly to a penalty shoot-out (no extra time was played).

=== Preliminary round ===
Team 1	Agg.	Team 2	1st leg	2nd leg
Gor Mahia (Kenya)	5–0	(Seychelles) Anse Réunion	0–0	5–0
CS Don Bosco (Democratic Republic of the Congo)	3–4	(South Africa) SuperSport United	0–1	3–3
Gaborone United (Botswana)	2–3	(Mozambique) Liga Muçulmana	2–2	0–1
Mogas 90 (Benin)	w/o	(Togo) AS Douanes Lomé	—	—
Rail Club du Kadiogo (Burkina Faso)	2–1	(Niger) Sahel	1–1	1–0
LLB Académic (Burundi)	2–1	(Rwanda) Police	1–0	1–1
Panthère du Ndé (Cameroon)	3–1	(Chad) Elect-Sport	2–0	1–1
Desportivo de Guadalupe (São Tomé and Príncipe)	1–17	(Gabon) US Bitam	0–5	1–12
Anges de Fatima (Central African Republic)	2–5	(Ethiopia) Dedebit	0–4	2–1
TCO Boeny (Madagascar)	3–3 (5–3 p)	(Eswatini) Mbabane Highlanders	1–2	2–1
Gamtel (The Gambia)	5–2	(Senegal) HLM	2–1	3–1
New Edubiase United (Ghana)	1–1 (4–5 p)	(Republic of the Congo) Diables Noirs	1–0	0–1
The Panthers (Equatorial Guinea)	3–0	(Guinea) Séquence	1–0	2–0
Power Dynamos (Zambia)	1–2	(Angola) Recreativo da Caála	1–0	0–2
Unisport Bafang (Cameroon)	0–3	(Mali) US Bougouni	0–1	0–2
Stella Club d'Adjamé (Ivory Coast)	1–4	(Mali) Onze Créateurs	1–1	0–3
Barrack Young Controllers II (Liberia)	1–0	(Sierra Leone) Johansen	1–0	0–0
Azam (Tanzania)	8–1	(South Sudan) El Nasir	3–1	5–0
Al-Nasr (Libya)	1–0	(Sudan) Al-Khartoum	0–0	1–0

Notes

1. AS Douanes advanced to the first round after Mogas 90 withdrew.

=== First round ===
Team 1	Agg.	Team 2	1st leg	2nd leg
ENPPI (Egypt)	3–0	(Kenya) Gor Mahia	3–0	0–0
Petro Luanda (Angola)	0–2	(South Africa) SuperSport United	0–0	0–2
Lobi Stars (Nigeria)	4–8	(Mozambique) Liga Muçulmana	3–1	1–7
Wydad AC (Morocco)	4–1	(Togo) AS Douanes Lomé	3–0	1–1
Rail Club du Kadiogo (Burkina Faso)	2–3	(Ivory Coast) ASEC Mimosas	1–2	1–1
DC Motema Pembe (Democratic Republic of the Congo)	1–2	(Burundi) LLB Académic	1–0	0–2
USM Alger (Algeria)	4–2	(Cameroon) Panthère du Ndé	1–0	3–2
Heartland (Nigeria)	w/o	(Gabon) US Bitam	2–1	—
Al-Ahly Shendi (Sudan)	1–0	(Ethiopia) Dedebit	1–0	0–0
Ismaily (Egypt)	4–2	(Madagascar) TCO Boeny	2–0	2–2
CS Sfaxien (Tunisia)	7–3	(The Gambia) Gamtel	4–2	3–1
Diables Noirs (Republic of the Congo)	6–1	(Equatorial Guinea) The Panthers	6–1	0–0
Recreativo da Caála (Angola)	6–0	(Mali) US Bougouni	4–0	2–0
Étoile du Sahel (Tunisia)	5–3	(Mali) Onze Créateurs	2–1	3–2
Barrack Young Controllers II (Liberia)	1–2	(Tanzania) Azam	1–2	0–0
FAR Rabat (Morocco)	2–1	(Libya) Al-Nasr	1–0	1–1

Notes

2. Order of legs reversed after original draw.
3. US Bitam advanced to the second round after Heartland arrived late for the second leg, as per ruling made by the CAF.

=== Second round ===
Team 1	Agg.	Team 2	1st leg	2nd leg
ENPPI (Egypt)	3–1	(South Africa) SuperSport United	0–0	3–1
Liga Muçulmana (Mozambique)	3–3 (a)	(Morocco) Wydad AC	2–0	1–3
ASEC Mimosas (Ivory Coast)	1–1 (2–4 p)	(Burundi) LLB Académic	1–0	0–1
USM Alger (Algeria)	0–3	(Gabon) US Bitam	0–0	0–3
Al-Ahly Shendi (Sudan)	0–0 (3–4 p)	(Egypt) Ismaily	0–0	0–0
CS Sfaxien (Tunisia)	4–2	(Republic of the Congo) Diables Noirs	3–1	1–1
Recreativo da Caála (Angola)	2–7	(Tunisia) Étoile du Sahel	1–1	1–6
Azam (Tanzania)	1–2	(Morocco) FAR Rabat	0–0	1–2

=== Play-off round ===
The draw for the play-off round was held on 7 May 2013. The winners of the Confederation Cup second round were drawn against the losers of the Champions League second round, with the former hosting the second leg.

Team 1	Agg.	Team 2	1st leg	2nd leg
Stade Malien (Mali)	6–0	(Burundi) LLB Académic	5–0	1–0
Enugu Rangers (Nigeria)	w/o	(Tunisia) CS Sfaxien	1–0	0–0
FUS Rabat (Morocco)	4–3	(Morocco) FAR Rabat	1–0	3–3
CA Bizertin (Tunisia)	3–1	(Egypt) Ismaily	3–0	0–1
ES Sétif (Algeria)	2–2 (5–3 p)	(Gabon) US Bitam	2–0	0–2
JSM Béjaïa (Algeria)	3–4	(Tunisia) Étoile du Sahel	2–2	1–2
TP Mazembe (Democratic Republic of the Congo)	5–2	(Mozambique) Liga Muçulmana	4–0	1–2
Saint George (Ethiopia)	3–3 (a)	(Egypt) ENPPI	2–0	1–3

Notes

4. CS Sfaxien advanced to the group stage after Enugu Rangers, which had originally won 1–0 on aggregate, was ruled by the CAF to have fielded an ineligible player in the second leg and thus disqualified.

== Group stage ==
The draw for the group stage was held on 14 May 2013. The eight teams were drawn into two groups of four. Each group was played on a home-and-away round-robin basis. The winners and runners-up of each group advanced to the semi-finals.

Tiebreakers

The teams are ranked according to points (3 points for a win, 1 point for a tie, 0 points for a loss). If tied on points, tiebreakers are applied in the following order:

1. Number of points obtained in games between the teams concerned
2. Goal difference in games between the teams concerned
3. Away goals scored in games between the teams concerned
4. Goal difference in all games
5. Goals scored in all games

=== Group A ===
Team	Pld	W	D	L	GF	GA	GD	Pts	CSS	SM	ESS	SG
(Tunisia) CS Sfaxien	6	4	2	0	8	3	+5	14		0–0	1–0	1–0
(Mali) Stade Malien	6	2	2	2	3	4	−1	8	1–2		0–0	1–0
(Tunisia) Étoile du Sahel	6	1	3	2	3	4	−1	6	1–1	0–1		2–1
(Ethiopia) Saint George	6	1	1	4	4	7	−3	4	1–3	2–0	0–0	

Legend: Blue = home team win; Yellow = draw; Red = away team win.

=== Group B ===
Team	Pld	W	D	L	GF	GA	GD	Pts	TPM	CAB	FUS	ESS
(Democratic Republic of the Congo) TP Mazembe	6	3	1	2	9	6	+3	10		1–0	3–0	4–2
(Tunisia) CA Bizertin	6	2	2	2	3	3	0	8 (Note: Tiebreakers: CA Bizertin are ranked ahead of FUS Rabat on head-to-head record.)	1–0		1–0	0–0
(Morocco) FUS Rabat	6	2	2	2	5	6	−1	8	2–0	1–1		1–0
(Algeria) ES Sétif	6	1	3	2	5	7	−2	6	1–1	1–0	1–1	

Legend: Blue = home team win; Yellow = draw; Red = away team win.

== Knockout stage ==
Knock-out ties were played on a home-and-away two-legged basis. If the sides were level on aggregate after the second leg, the away goals rule was applied, and if still level, the tie proceeded directly to a penalty shoot-out (no extra time was played).

=== Bracket ===
Semi-finals
1	(Tunisia) CA Bizertin	0	0	0
4	(Tunisia) CS Sfaxien	0	1	1
3	(Mali) Stade Malien	1	0	1
2	(Democratic Republic of the Congo) TP Mazembe	2	1	3

Final
(Tunisia) CS Sfaxien	2	1	3
(Democratic Republic of the Congo) TP Mazembe	0	2	2

=== Semi-finals ===
In the semi-finals, the group A winners played the group B runners-up and the group B winners played the group A runners-up, with the group winners hosting the second leg.

Team 1	Agg.	Team 2	1st leg	2nd leg
CA Bizertin (Tunisia)	0–1	(Tunisia) CS Sfaxien	0–0	0–1
Stade Malien (Mali)	1–3	(Democratic Republic of the Congo) TP Mazembe	1–2	0–1

=== Final ===
In the final, the order of the legs was decided by a draw.

23 November 2013
18:00 UTC+1

CS Sfaxien (Tunisia)	2–0	(Democratic Republic of the Congo) TP Mazembe
Ndong 16'; Khenissi 90+1'	Report

Stade Olympique de Radès, Radès
Referee: Eric Otogo-Castane (Gabon)
30 November 2013
15:30 UTC+2

TP Mazembe (Democratic Republic of the Congo)	2–1	(Tunisia) CS Sfaxien
Traoré 10'; Samatta 24'	Report	Ben Youssef 88'

Stade TP Mazembe, Lubumbashi
Referee: Daniel Bennett (South Africa)

CS Sfaxien won 3–2 on aggregate.

== Top scorers ==
Rank	Player	Team	Goals
1	(Ivory Coast) Vincent Die Foneye	(Egypt) ENPPI	6
1	(Tanzania) Mbwana Samatta	(Democratic Republic of the Congo) TP Mazembe	6
1	(Mozambique) Sonito	(Mozambique) Liga Muçulmana	6
4	(Ivory Coast) Franck Guedegbe	(Gabon) US Bitam	5
4	(Ivory Coast) Idrissa Kouyaté	(Tunisia) CS Sfaxien	5
4	(Tunisia) Mossaâb Sassi	(Tunisia) Étoile du Sahel	5
7	(Tunisia) Fakhreddine Ben Youssef	(Tunisia) CS Sfaxien	4
7	(Gabon) Étienne Alain Djissikadié	(Gabon) US Bitam	4
7	(Tunisia) Taha Yassine Khenissi	(Tunisia) CS Sfaxien	4
7	(Ivory Coast) Losseni Komara	(Republic of the Congo) Diables Noirs	4

== See also ==
- 2013 CAF Champions League
- 2014 CAF Super Cup
