= 2014 CAF Confederation Cup knockout stage =

The knock-out stage of the 2014 CAF Confederation Cup was played from 20 September to 6 December 2014. A total of four teams competed in the knock-out stage.

== Qualified teams ==
The winners and runners-up of each of the two groups in the group stage qualified for the knock-out stage.

| Group | Winners | Runners-up |
|---|---|---|
| A | (Republic of the Congo) AC Léopards | (Cameroon) Coton Sport |
| B | (Egypt) Al-Ahly | (Ivory Coast) Séwé Sport |

== Format ==
Knock-out ties were played on a home-and-away two-legged basis. If the sides were level on aggregate after the second leg, the away goals rule was applied, and if still level, the tie proceeded directly to a penalty shoot-out (no extra time was played).

== Schedule ==
The schedule of each round was as follows.

| Round | First leg | Second leg |
|---|---|---|
| Semi-finals | 19–21 September 2014 | 26–28 September 2014 |
| Final | 28–30 November 2014 | 5–7 December 2014 |

== Semi-finals ==
In the semi-finals, the group A winners played the group B runners-up, and the group B winners played the group A runners-up, with the group winners hosting the second leg.

| Team 1 | Agg. | Team 2 | 1st leg | 2nd leg |
|---|---|---|---|---|
| Séwé Sport (Ivory Coast) | 1–0 | (Republic of the Congo) AC Léopards | 1–0 | 0–0 |
| Coton Sport (Cameroon) | 1–3 | (Egypt) Al-Ahly | 0–1 | 1–2 |

21 September 2014
15:30 UTC±0

| Séwé Sport (Ivory Coast) | 1–0 | (Republic of the Congo) AC Léopards |
|---|---|---|
| Kouamé 57' | Report |

Stade Robert Champroux, Abidjan
Referee: Bernard Camille (Seychelles)
27 September 2014
15:30 UTC+1

| AC Léopards (Republic of the Congo) | 0–0 | (Ivory Coast) Séwé Sport |
|---|---|---|
| | Report |

Stade Denis Sassou Nguesso, Dolisie
Referee: Bakary Gassama (Gambia)

Séwé Sport won 1–0 on aggregate and advanced to the final.

20 September 2014
16:00 UTC+1

| Coton Sport (Cameroon) | 0–1 | (Egypt) Al-Ahly |
|---|---|---|
| | Report | Soliman 72' |

Roumdé Adjia Stadium, Garoua
Referee: Juste Ephrem Zio (Burkina Faso)
28 September 2014
19:00 UTC+2

| Al-Ahly (Egypt) | 2–1 | (Cameroon) Coton Sport |
|---|---|---|
| Yedan 41'; Gamal 78' | Report | Kombous 14' |

Cairo International Stadium, Cairo
Referee: Janny Sikazwe (Zambia)

Al-Ahly won 3–1 on aggregate and advanced to the final.

== Final ==
In the final, the order of legs was decided by a draw, held after the group stage draw (29 April 2014, 11:00 UTC+2, at the CAF Headquarters in Cairo, Egypt).

| Team 1 | Agg. | Team 2 | 1st leg | 2nd leg |
|---|---|---|---|---|
| Séwé Sport (Ivory Coast) | 2–2 (a) | (Egypt) Al-Ahly | 2–1 | 0–1 |

29 November 2014
15:00 UTC±0

| Séwé Sport (Ivory Coast) | 2–1 | (Egypt) Al-Ahly |
|---|---|---|
| Kouamé 24' (pen.); Assalé 81' | Report | Trezeguet 59' |

Stade Robert Champroux, Abidjan
Attendance: 5,000
Referee: Eric Otogo-Castane (Gabon)
6 December 2014
18:00 UTC+2

| Al-Ahly (Egypt) | 1–0 | (Ivory Coast) Séwé Sport |
|---|---|---|
| Moteab 90+6' | Report |

Cairo International Stadium, Cairo
Attendance: 50,000
Referee: Rajindraparsad Seechurn (Mauritius)

2–2 on aggregate. Al-Ahly won on the away goals rule.
