= 2013 Confederation Cup =

2013 Confederation Cup may refer to two football competitions:

- 2013 FIFA Confederations Cup between nations
- 2013 CAF Confederation Cup between African clubs
