= 2013 CAF Confederation Cup knockout stage =

The knock-out stage of the 2013 CAF Confederation Cup was played from 6 October to 30 November 2013. A total of four teams competed in the knock-out stage.

== Qualified teams ==
The winners and runners-up of each of the two groups in the group stage qualified for the knock-out stage.

Group	Winners	Runners-up
A	(Tunisia) CS Sfaxien	(Mali) Stade Malien
B	(Democratic Republic of the Congo) TP Mazembe	(Tunisia) CA Bizertin

== Format ==
Knock-out ties were played on a home-and-away two-legged basis. If the sides were level on aggregate after the second leg, the away goals rule was applied, and if still level, the tie proceeded directly to a penalty shoot-out (no extra time was played).

== Schedule ==
The schedule of each round was as follows.

Round	First leg	Second leg
Semi-finals	4–6 October 2013	18–20 October 2013
Final	22–24 November 2013	29 November–1 December 2013

== Semi-finals ==
In the semi-finals, the group A winners played the group B runners-up, and the group B winners played the group A runners-up, with the group winners hosting the second leg.

Team 1	Agg.	Team 2	1st leg	2nd leg
CA Bizertin (Tunisia)	0–1	(Tunisia) CS Sfaxien	0–0	0–1
Stade Malien (Mali)	1–3	(Democratic Republic of the Congo) TP Mazembe	1–2	0–1

6 October 2013
15:00 UTC+1

CA Bizertin (Tunisia)	0–0	(Tunisia) CS Sfaxien
	Report

Stade 15 Octobre, Bizerte
Referee: Mohamed Benouza (Algeria)
20 October 2013
15:00 UTC+1

CS Sfaxien (Tunisia)	1–0	(Tunisia) CA Bizertin
Kouyaté 44'	Report

Stade El Menzah, Tunis
Referee: Gehad Grisha (Egypt)

CS Sfaxien won 1–0 on aggregate and advanced to the final.

6 October 2013
16:00 UTC±0

Stade Malien (Mali)	1–2	(Democratic Republic of the Congo) TP Mazembe
Koïta 27'	Report	Kalaba 14'; Mputu 23'

Stade Modibo Kéïta, Bamako
Referee: Néant Alioum (Cameroon)
19 October 2013
15:30 UTC+2

TP Mazembe (Democratic Republic of the Congo)	1–0	(Mali) Stade Malien
Mputu 7' (pen.)	Report

Stade TP Mazembe, Lubumbashi
Referee: Djamel Haimoudi (Algeria)

TP Mazembe won 3–1 on aggregate and advanced to the final.

== Final ==
In the final, the order of legs was decided by a draw. The draw was held on 14 May 2013, 14:00 UTC+2, at the CAF Headquarters in Cairo, Egypt.

Team 1	Agg.	Team 2	1st leg	2nd leg
CS Sfaxien (Tunisia)	3–2	(Democratic Republic of the Congo) TP Mazembe	2–0	1–2

23 November 2013
18:00 UTC+1

CS Sfaxien (Tunisia)	2–0	(Democratic Republic of the Congo) TP Mazembe
N'Dong 16'; Khenissi 90+1'	Report

Stade Olympique de Radès, Radès
Referee: Eric Otogo-Castane (Gabon)
30 November 2013
15:30 UTC+2

TP Mazembe (Democratic Republic of the Congo)	2–1	(Tunisia) CS Sfaxien
Traoré 10'; Samatta 24'	Report	Ben Youssef 88'

Stade TP Mazembe, Lubumbashi
Referee: Daniel Bennett (South Africa)

CS Sfaxien won 3–2 on aggregate.
