= 2014 CAF Confederation Cup group stage =

- Dates: 17 May – 24 August 2014

Tournament statistics
- Matches played: 24
- Goals scored: 60 (2.5 per match)

The group stage of the 2014 CAF Confederation Cup was played from 17 May to 24 August 2014. A total of eight teams competed in the group stage.

== Draw ==
The draw for the group stage was held on 29 April 2014, 11:00 UTC+2, at the CAF Headquarters in Cairo, Egypt. The eight winners of the play-off round were drawn into two groups of four. Each group contained one team from each of the four seeding pots. The seeding of each team was determined by their ranking points calculated based on performances in continental club championships for the period 2009–2013.

The following eight teams were entered into the draw:

Pot 1	Pot 2	Pot 3	Pot 4
(Egypt) Al-Ahly (57 pts); (Cameroon) Coton Sport (21 pts)	(Republic of the Congo) AC Léopards (21 pts); (Ivory Coast) Séwé Sport (10 pts)	(Tunisia) Étoile du Sahel (7 pts); (Ivory Coast) ASEC Mimosas (3 pts)	(Mali) AS Real Bamako (0 pts); (Zambia) Nkana (0 pts)

== Format ==
In the group stage, each group was played on a home-and-away round-robin basis. The winners and runners-up of each group advanced to the semi-finals.

=== Tiebreakers ===
The teams are ranked according to points (3 points for a win, 1 point for a draw, 0 points for a loss). If tied on points, tiebreakers are applied in the following order:

1. Number of points obtained in games between the teams concerned
2. Goal difference in games between the teams concerned
3. Away goals scored in games between the teams concerned
4. Goal difference in all games
5. Goals scored in all games

== Groups ==
The matchdays were 16–18 May, 23–25 May, 6–8 June, 25–27 July, 8–10 August, and 22–24 August 2014.

=== Group A ===
Team	Pld	W	D	L	GF	GA	GD	Pts	LEO	COT	RBA	MIM
(Republic of the Congo) AC Léopards	6	3	2	1	11	4	+7	11 (Note: Tiebreakers: AC Léopards and Coton Sport are ranked on head-to-head record.)		0–0	1–2	4–1
(Cameroon) Coton Sport	6	3	2	1	8	9	−1	11	0–4		2–1	2–1
(Mali) AS Real Bamako	6	1	3	2	6	7	−1	6	1–2	1–1		1–1
(Ivory Coast) ASEC Mimosas	6	0	3	3	5	10	−5	3	0–0	2–3	0–0	

Notes:
17 May 2014
16:00 UTC±0

AS Real Bamako (Mali)	1–1	(Ivory Coast) ASEC Mimosas
Koné 86'	Report	Mvondo 63'

Stade Modibo Kéïta, Bamako
Referee: Slim Jedidi (Tunisia)

24 May 2014
15:30 UTC±0

ASEC Mimosas (Ivory Coast)	0–0	(Republic of the Congo) AC Léopards
	Report

Stade Félix Houphouët-Boigny, Abidjan
Referee: Hamada Nampiandraza (Madagascar)
25 May 2014
15:30 UTC+1

Coton Sport (Cameroon)	2–1	(Mali) AS Real Bamako
Daouda 32'; Yossanguim 79'	Report	Sylla 57'

Roumdé Adjia Stadium, Garoua
Referee: Noumandiez Doué (Ivory Coast)

6 June 2014
15:00 UTC±0

ASEC Mimosas (Ivory Coast)	2–3	(Cameroon) Coton Sport
Zagbayou 33'; Fofana 44'	Report	Daouda 21', 90'; Zimbori-Auzingoni 59' (pen.)

Stade Félix Houphouët-Boigny, Abidjan
Referee: Mohamed Benouza (Algeria)
7 June 2014
15:30 UTC±0

AS Real Bamako (Mali)	1–2	(Republic of the Congo) AC Léopards
Sylla 64'	Report	Gandzé 36'; Bidimbou 88'

Stade Modibo Kéïta, Bamako
Referee: El Fadil Mohamed (Sudan)

15 July 2014
15:30 UTC+1

AC Léopards (Republic of the Congo)	0–0	(Cameroon) Coton Sport
	Report

Stade Denis Sassou Nguesso, Dolisie
Referee: Gehad Grisha (Egypt)

Note: The AC Léopards v Coton Sport match of Matchday 1 was postponed due to the 2015 Africa Cup of Nations qualification match between Namibia and Congo on the same weekend.

26 July 2014
15:30 UTC+1

Coton Sport (Cameroon)	2–1	(Ivory Coast) ASEC Mimosas
Mpondo 5'; Daouda 6'	Report	Foba 28'

Roumdé Adjia Stadium, Garoua
Referee: Joshua Bondo (Botswana)
27 July 2014
15:30 UTC+1

AC Léopards (Republic of the Congo)	1–2	(Mali) AS Real Bamako
Gandzé 40'	Report	Sylla 33'; Diarra 60'

Stade Denis Sassou Nguesso, Dolisie
Referee: Rédouane Jiyed (Morocco)

9 August 2014
15:30 UTC+1

Coton Sport (Cameroon)	0–4	(Republic of the Congo) AC Léopards
	Report	Bidimbou 54', 75', 83'; Gandzé 72'

Roumdé Adjia Stadium, Garoua
Referee: Mohamed Said Kordi (Tunisia)
10 August 2014
15:30 UTC±0

ASEC Mimosas (Ivory Coast)	0–0	(Mali) AS Real Bamako
	Report

Stade Félix Houphouët-Boigny, Abidjan
Referee: Aboubacar Mario Bangoura (Guinea)

24 August 2014
15:30 UTC+1

AC Léopards (Republic of the Congo)	4–1	(Ivory Coast) ASEC Mimosas
Bidimbou 43', 67'; Gandzé 45+1', 47'	Report	Dao 40'

Stade Denis Sassou Nguesso, Dolisie
Referee: Victor Gomes (South Africa)
24 August 2014
14:30 UTC±0

AS Real Bamako (Mali)	1–1	(Cameroon) Coton Sport
Sylla 43'	Report	Kombous 90+3'

Stade Modibo Kéïta, Bamako
Referee: Joseph Lamptey (Ghana)

=== Group B ===
Team	Pld	W	D	L	GF	GA	GD	Pts	AHL	SEW	NKA	ESS
(Egypt) Al-Ahly	6	2	3	1	5	3	+2	9 (Note: Tiebreakers: Al-Ahly and Séwé Sport are ranked on head-to-head record.)		1–0	2–0	0–0
(Ivory Coast) Séwé Sport	6	2	3	1	7	4	+3	9	1–1		3–0	1–1
(Zambia) Nkana	6	2	1	3	9	13	−4	7	1–0	1–1		4–3
(Tunisia) Étoile du Sahel	6	1	3	2	9	10	−1	6	1–1	0–1	4–3	

Notes:
17 May 2014
20:00 UTC+3

Al-Ahly (Egypt)	2–0	(Zambia) Nkana
Gamal 46'; Gedo 56'	Report

Petro Sport Stadium, Cairo
Referee: Djamel Haimoudi (Algeria)
18 May 2014
15:30 UTC±0

Séwé Sport (Ivory Coast)	1–1	(Tunisia) Étoile du Sahel
Kouao 32'	Report	Bounedjah 79'

Stade Robert Champroux, Abidjan
Referee: Daniel Bennett (South Africa)

24 May 2014
15:00 UTC+2

Nkana (Zambia)	1–1	(Ivory Coast) Séwé Sport
Kampamba 54'	Report	Assalé 20'

Nkana Stadium, Kitwe
Referee: Bouchaïb El Ahrach (Morocco)
25 May 2014
18:00 UTC+1

Étoile du Sahel (Tunisia)	1–1	(Egypt) Al-Ahly
Bounedjah 40'	Report	Gamal 60'

Stade Olympique de Sousse, Sousse
Referee: Sylvester Kirwa (Kenya)

7 June 2014
19:00 UTC+1

Étoile du Sahel (Tunisia)	4–3	(Zambia) Nkana
Bounedjah 20' (pen.); Bangoura 53', 85'; Jaziri 80'	Report	Abderrazak 8' (o.g.); Kangwa 30'; Mwansa 79' (pen.)

Stade Olympique de Sousse, Sousse
Referee: Maguette N'Diaye (Senegal)
8 June 2014
15:30 UTC±0

Séwé Sport (Ivory Coast)	1–1	(Egypt) Al-Ahly
Akrofi 78'	Report	Yedan 45'

Stade Robert Champroux, Abidjan
Referee: Juste Ephrem Zio (Burkina Faso)

26 July 2014
15:00 UTC+2

Nkana (Zambia)	4–3	(Tunisia) Étoile du Sahel
Kampamba 11'; Mbewe 27'; S. Bwalya 49'; Munthali 57'	Report	Mouihbi 5' (pen.), 90+5' (pen.); Moussa 31'

Nkana Stadium, Kitwe
Referee: Tessema Bamlak (Ethiopia)
26 July 2014
21:30 UTC+2

Al-Ahly (Egypt)	1–0	(Ivory Coast) Séwé Sport
Soliman 4' (pen.)	Report

30 June Stadium, Cairo
Referee: Mahamadou Keita (Mali)

9 August 2014
15:00 UTC+2

Nkana (Zambia)	1–0	(Egypt) Al-Ahly
Mwanza 51' (pen.)	Report

Nkana Stadium, Kitwe
Referee: Bernard Camille (Seychelles)
9 August 2014
18:30 UTC+1

Étoile du Sahel (Tunisia)	0–1	(Ivory Coast) Séwé Sport
	Report	Aka 51'

Stade Olympique de Sousse, Sousse
Referee: Mohamed Benouza (Algeria)

23 August 2014
18:00 UTC+3

Al-Ahly (Egypt)	0–0	(Tunisia) Étoile du Sahel
	Report

Cairo International Stadium, Cairo
Referee: Koman Coulibaly (Mali)
23 August 2014
15:00 UTC±0

Séwé Sport (Ivory Coast)	3–0	(Zambia) Nkana
Kouao 10'; Kameni 48'; Assalé 73'	Report

Stade Robert Champroux, Abidjan
Referee: Ali Lemghaifry (Mauritania)
