= Mohamed Hedi Gaaloul =

Tunisian association football player

Mohamed Gaaloul
Personal information
- Full name: Mohamed Hedi Gaaloul
- Date of birth: 30 April 1989 (age 37)
- Place of birth: Tunisia
- Position: Goalkeeper

Team information
- Current team: CS Sfaxien
- Number: 1

Senior career*
Years	Team	Apps	(Gls)
2013–	CS Sfaxien	46	(0)
- * Club domestic league appearances and goals as of 13 April 2022 ‡ National team caps and goals as of 19:28, 11 December 2021 (UTC)

Mohamed Hedi Gaaloul (born 30 April 1989) is a Tunisian footballer who plays as a goalkeeper for CS Sfaxien.
