= Bassem Boulaâbi =

Tunisian footballer

Bassem Boulaâbi بسام البولعابي
Personal information
- Full name: Bassem Boulaâbi
- Date of birth: 11 January 1984 (age 42)
- Place of birth: Tunis, Tunisia
- Height: 1.92 m (6 ft 4 in)
- Position: Centre back

Team information
- Current team: AS Marsa

Youth career
- 1999–2005: Stade Tunisien

Senior career*
Years	Team	Apps	(Gls)
2005–2008	Stade Tunisien		
2009–2011	ÉS Sahel	21	(1)
2010	→ AS Kasserine (loan)		
2011–2012	AS Marsa	19	(1)
2012–2015	CS Sfaxien	59	(3)
2015	Hangzhou Greentown	16	(1)
2016–2018	Stade Tunisien	21	(0)
2018–2019	Hammam-Lif	24	(0)
2019–	AS Marsa		

International career
2012–2013	Tunisia	3	(0)
- * Club domestic league appearances and goals as of 22:18, 18 January 2020 (UTC)

Bassem Boulaâbi (Arabic: بسام البولعابي; born 11 January 1984 in Tunis) is a Tunisian footballer who currently plays for Stade Tunisien.

== Club career ==
On 15 January 2015, Boulaâbi had his contract with CS Sfaxien terminated by mutual consent. On 18 January, he moved abroad for the first time in his career, joining Chinese Super League side Hangzhou Greentown. He was sent to reserved squad in July 2015 after team manager Philippe Troussier was sacked by the club.

== International career ==
On 27 May 2012, Boulaâbi made his debut for Tunisia national football team in a 5–1 victory against Rwanda.

== Honours ==
CS Sfaxien

- CAF Confederation Cup: 2013
- Tunisian Ligue Professionnelle 1: 2012–13
