= Ghazi Challouf =

Tunisian footballer

Personal information
- Date of birth: 15 June 1990 (age 36)
- Position: Midfielder

Senior career*
Years	Team	Apps	(Gls)
2010–2015	CS Sfaxien		
2015–2016	EGS Gafsa		
2016–2017	JS Kairouan		
2017–2018	Stade Tunisien		
2018–2019	El Raja SC		
- * Club domestic league appearances and goals

Ghazi Challouf (born 15 June 1990) is a Tunisian football midfielder.
