= Mahmoud Ben Salah =

Tunisian footballer

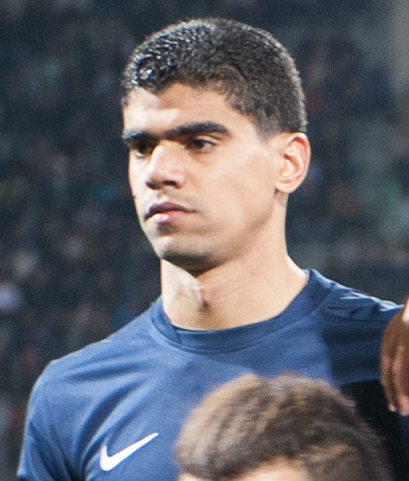

Personal information
- Full name: Mahmoud Ben Salah
- Date of birth: 6 May 1988 (age 38)
- Place of birth: Sfax, Tunisia
- Height: 1.90 m (6 ft 3 in)
- Position: Defender

Team information
- Current team: Al-Rayyan
- Number: 25

Youth career
- Sfaxien

Senior career*
Years	Team	Apps	(Gls)
2009–2018	Sfaxien	109	(4)
2018–2019	Damac	35	(2)
2019–2020	Al-Bukayriyah	33	(2)
2020–2021	Al-Diriyah	34	(2)
2021–2022	Al-Riyadh		
2022–2023	Al-Taraji		
2024–	Al-Rayyan		

International career
2011	Tunisia	1	(0)
- * Club domestic league appearances and goals

Mahmoud Ben Salah (born 6 May 1988) is a Tunisian footballer who currently plays as a defender for Saudi club Al-Rayyan.
