= Cheibane Traoré =

Malian footballer

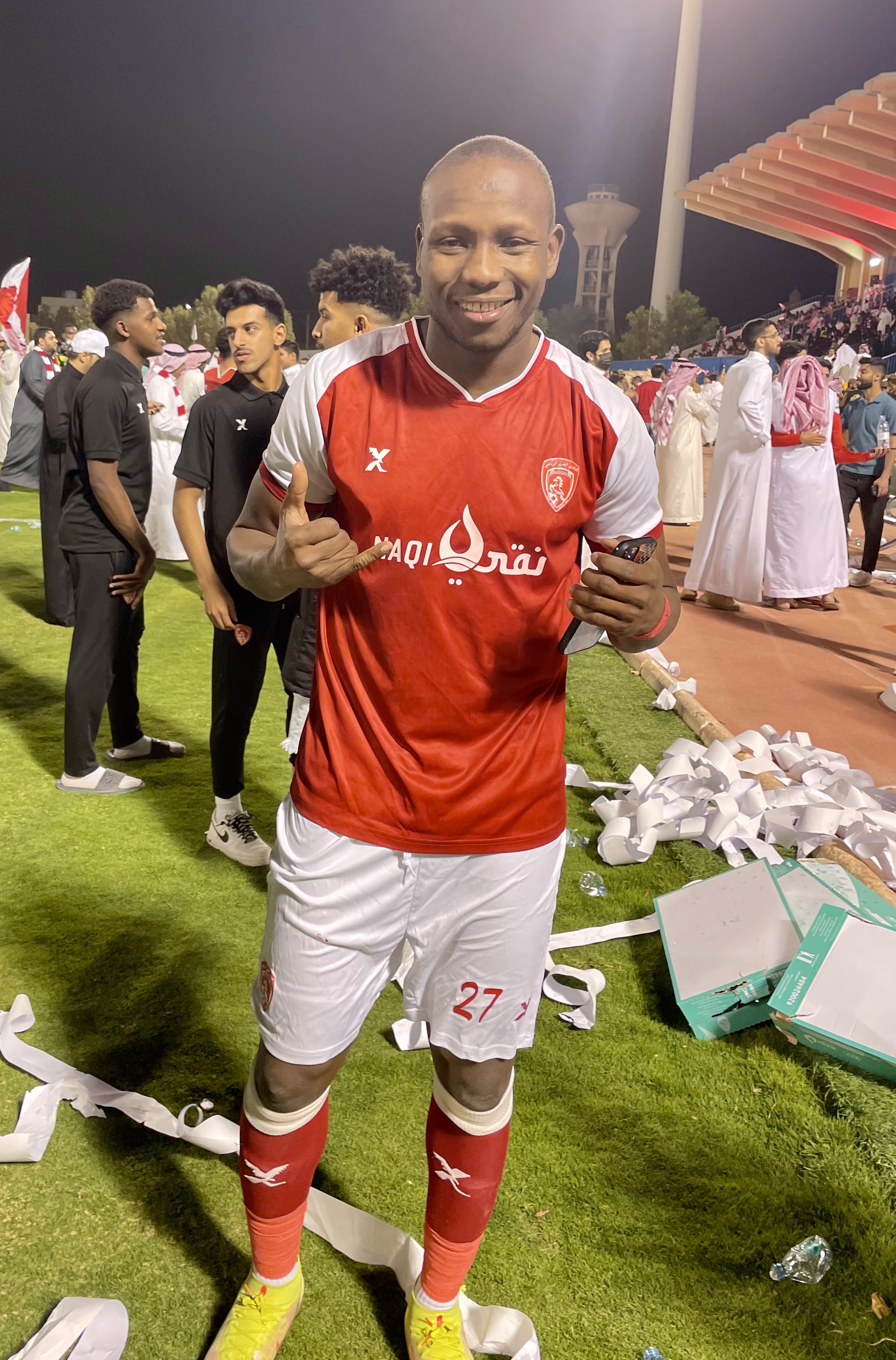
- 2022

Personal information
- Full name: Cheibane Traoré
- Date of birth: 14 December 1990 (age 35)
- Place of birth: Bamako, Mali
- Height: 1.84 m (6 ft 0 in)
- Position: Forward

Senior career*
Years	Team	Apps	(Gls)
2008–2010	Duguwolofila		
2010–2012	Stade Malien		
2012–2015	Mazembe	55	(18)
2015–2017	RS Berkane	23	(2)
2016–2017	→ Kénitra (loan)	12	(1)
2017–2018	ENPPI	7	(0)
2018–2021	Al-Nahda	?	(42)
2021–2022	Al-Arabi	?	(4)

International career
2009	Mali	3	(0)
- * Club domestic league appearances and goals

Cheibane Traoré (born 14 December 1990) is a Malian footballer who plays as a forward.
