= Maher Hannachi =

Tunisian footballer (born 1984)

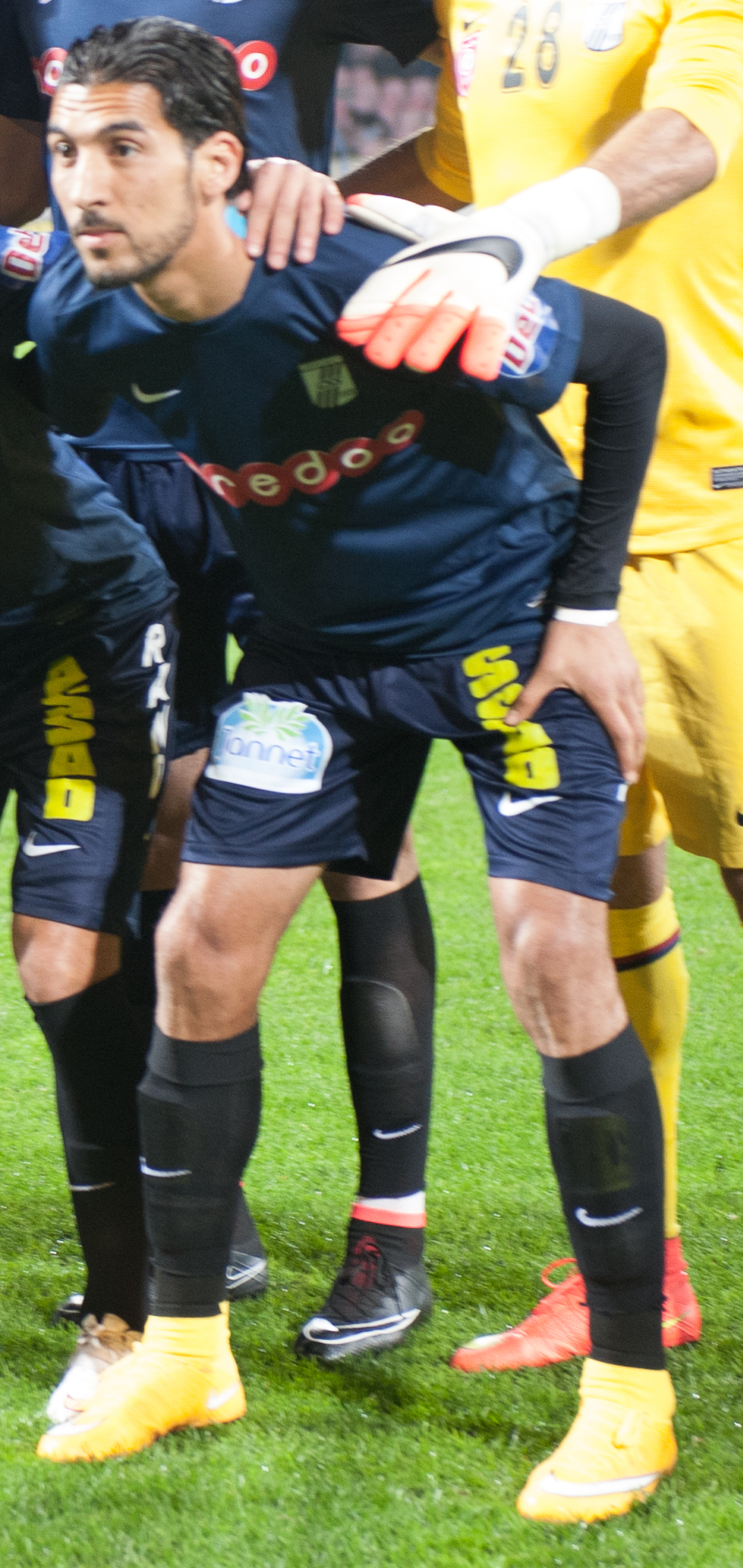

Personal information
- Full name: Maher Ben Omar Hannachi
- Date of birth: 31 August 1984 (age 42)
- Place of birth: Monastir, Tunisia
- Height: 1.75 m (5 ft 9 in)
- Position: Winger

Senior career*
Years	Team	Apps	(Gls)
2007–2010	US Monastir	23	(5)
2010–2011	Ittihad Tripoli	1	(0)
2011–2013	US Monastir	40	(4)
2013–2018	CS Sfaxien	126	(15)
2018–2020	Étoile du Sahel	36	(6)
2020–2021	Ohod	15	(0)

International career^{‡}
2009–2019	Tunisia	7	(1)
- * Club domestic league appearances and goals as of 19 July 2018 ‡ National team caps and goals as of 21 March 2017

Maher Ben Omar Hannachi (Arabic: ماهر بن عمر الحناشي, born 31 August 1984) is a Tunisian footballer who plays as a winger.

== Club career ==
Hannachi moved to Libyan Premier League club Ittihad Tripoli S.C. from US Monastir in the 2009–10 season. After spending two seasons at the Tripoli-based club, he returned to Monastir.

After a 5-year spell at CS Sfaxien, he joined Étoile du Sahel in July 2018.

== International career ==
=== International goals ===
Scores and results list Tunisia's goal tally first.

No	Date	Venue	Opponent	Score	Result	Competition
1.	12 June 2015	Stade Olympique de Radès, Radès, Tunisia	Djibouti	7–1	8–1	2017 Africa Cup of Nations qualification
