= Amr Gamal =

Egyptian footballer (born 1991)

Amr Gamal عَمْرو جَمَال
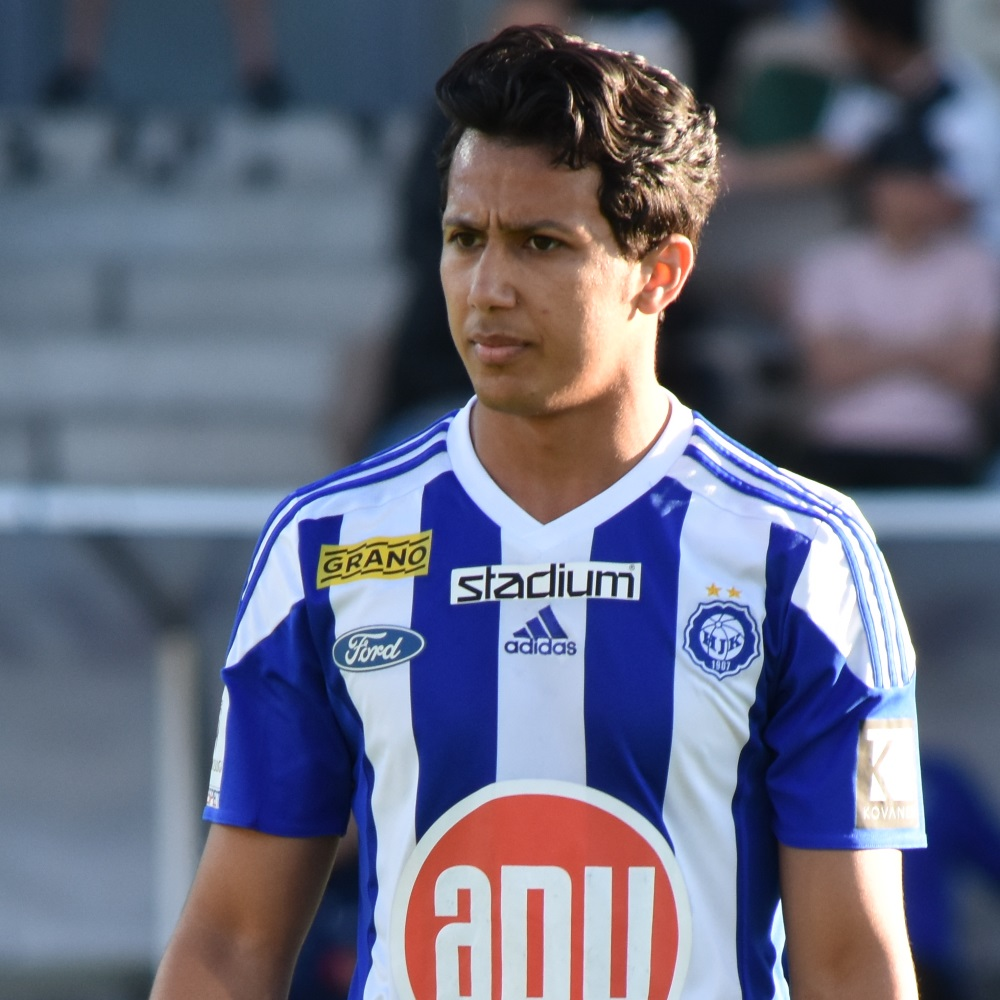
- Gamal with HJK Helsinki in 2018

Personal information
- Full name: Amr Gamal Sayed Ahmed
- Date of birth: 3 August 1991 (age 35)
- Place of birth: Nag Hammadi, Qena, Egypt
- Height: 1.81 m (5 ft 11 in)
- Position: Striker

Team information
- Current team: Haras El Hodoud

Youth career
- Al Ahly

Senior career*
Years	Team	Apps	(Gls)
2013–2021	Al Ahly	68	(18)
2017–2018	→ Bidvest Wits (loan)	13	(2)
2018	→ HJK (loan)	12	(1)
2019–2021	→ Tala'ea El Gaish (loan)	59	(13)
2021–2024	Pharco	66	(7)
2024–	Haras El Hodoud	12	(2)

International career^{‡}
2014–	Egypt	19	(3)
- * Club domestic league appearances and goals as of 27 November 2024 ‡ National team caps and goals as of 12 November 2017

Amr Gamal Sayed Ahmed (Egyptian Arabic: عَمْرو جَمَال سَيِّد أَحْمَد; born 3 August 1991) is an Egyptian footballer who plays for Egyptian Premier League club Haras El Hodoud as a striker.

== Club career ==
On 28 May 2013, Gamal made his debut with Al-Ahly senior team in 2012–13 Egyptian Premier League match against Ghazl El Mahalla SC. He came off the bench to score the winner in the 90th minute. On 26 December 2013, Gamal played his second league game with Al-Ahly against El-Entag El-Harby in a win 2–0. He came off the bench in the first half and scored a goal.

Gamal was a member of the Al-Ahly squad that won the 2013 CAF Champions League and was included in the squad for 2013 FIFA Club World Cup. He participated against C.F. Monterrey in the second half.

On 27 October 2014, he suffered an injury to his cruciate ligament during the game against Alassiouty Sport in the season of 2014–15 Egyptian Premier League, five minutes after the beginning of the game. After eight months, Gamal returned to football, scoring his first after reappearance on 3 July 2015 against Wadi Degla SC in the same season in a match Al-Ahly won 3–1.

Amr Gamal became the first Egyptian to play in South Africa after Al Ahly agreed a loan deal with Bidvest Wits on 12 August 2017.

On 22 March 2018, HJK Helsinki announced the signing of Gamal on loan until the end of August 2018.

== International career ==
On 5 March 2014, he made his international debut with the Egyptian national team vs Republic of Bosnia and Herzegovina national team

== Career statistics ==
As of 27 November 2024.

Appearances and goals by club, season and competition
Club	Season	League			National cup (Note: Includes Egypt Cup and Suomen Cup)		Continental		Other		Total	
Club	Season	Division	Apps	Goals	Apps	Goals	Apps	Goals	Apps	Goals	Apps	Goals
Al Ahly	2012–13	Egyptian Premier League	1	1	0	0	1 (Note: Includes CAF Champions League)	0	–		2	1
Al Ahly	2013–14	Egyptian Premier League	21	9	3	2	5 (Note: Includes CAF Super Cup and CAF Champions League)	3	1 (Note: Includes FIFA Club World Cup)	0	30	14
Al Ahly	2014–15	Egyptian Premier League	11	3	2	0	–		1 (Note: Includes Egyptian Super Cup)	0	14	3
Al Ahly	2015–16	Egyptian Premier League	19	4	5	0	8	1	0	0	32	5
Al Ahly	2016–17	Egyptian Premier League	16	1	4	4	4	2	0	0	24	7
Al Ahly	Total		68	18	14	6	18	6	2	0	102	30
Bidvest Wits (loan)	2017–18	South African Premier Division	13	2	0	0	–		6 (Note: Includes MTN 8 and Carling Knockout Cup)	3	19	5
HJK (loan)	2018	Veikkausliiga	12	1	3	0	0	0	–		15	1
Tala'ea El Gaish (loan)	2019–20	Egyptian Premier League	27	3	5	0	–		–		32	3
Tala'ea El Gaish (loan)	2020–21	Egyptian Premier League	32	10	1	1	–		–		33	11
Tala'ea El Gaish (loan)	Total		59	13	6	1	–	–	–	–	65	14
Pharco	2021–22	Egyptian Premier League	11	2	0	0	–		1 (Note: Includes Egyptian League Cup)	0	12	2
Pharco	2022–23	Egyptian Premier League	24	3	1	1	–		–		25	4
Pharco	2023–24	Egyptian Premier League	30	2	1	0	–		2	1	33	3
Pharco	Total		65	7	2	1	–	–	3	1	70	9
Haras El Hodoud	2024–25	Egyptian Premier League	2	0	0	0	–		–		2	0
Career total			219	41	25	8	18	6	11	4	273	59

=== International goals ===
Scores and results list Egypt's goal tally first.

#	Date	Venue	Opponent	Score	Result	Competition
1	15 October 2014	Cairo International Stadium, Cairo, Egypt	Botswana	1–0	2–0	2015 Africa Cup of Nations qualification
2	11 October 2015	Mohammed Bin Zayed Stadium, Abu Dhabi, United Arab Emirates	Zambia	3–0	3–0	Friendly

== Honours ==
=== Club ===
Al Ahly

- Egyptian Premier League: 2013–14, 2015–16, 2016–17
- Egypt Cup: 2017
- Egyptian Super Cup: 2014
- CAF Champions League: 2013
- CAF Confederation Cup: 2014
- CAF Super Cup: 2014

Bidvest Wits

- Telkom Knockout: 2017

HJK Helsinki

- Veikkausliiga: 2018
