= Moussa Yedan =

Burkinabé footballer (born 1989)

Personal information
- Date of birth: 20 July 1989 (age 37)
- Place of birth: Bobo-Dioulasso, Burkina Faso
- Height: 1.72 m (5 ft 8 in)
- Positions: Attacking midfielder; left winger

Team information
- Current team: Majestic

Youth career
- –2009: Étoile Filante

Senior career*
Years	Team	Apps	(Gls)
2009–2012	Étoile Filante		
2013	Coton Sport		
2014–2015	Al-Ahly	18	(1)
2015	Al-Orobah	6	(0)
2015–2016	Haras El-Hodood	17	(0)
2017–2018	AS Tanda		
2018	Étoile Filante		
2018–2019	AS Otohô		
2019–2020	Majestic	15	(2)
2020–2021	Rahimo FC Bama	16	(3)
2021–	RC Bobo-Dioulasso		

International career^{‡}
2012–	Burkina Faso	8	(0)
- * Club domestic league appearances and goals as of 20:59, 1 November 2021 (UTC) ‡ National team caps and goals as of 20:59, 1 November 2021 (UTC)

Moussa Yedan (born 20 July 1989) is a Burkinabé footballer who currently plays for Majestic FC. Yedan played for Egyptian Premier League side Al-Ahly as well as Burkina Faso national football team.

Former star player of Étoile Filante, the Burkinabé joined Coton Sport ahead of the 2013 season, breaking into the first team after the half-way break. Moussa Yedan played for the various youth teams of Burkina Faso and was approached by Romanian and Belgium clubs before making his move to Garoua. The left winger competed in the 2013 CAF Champions League, securing a regular starting spot in the squad, before losing in the semi-finals to the title holders Al-Ahly of Egypt. After the competition, he made a move to Al-Ahly. Yedan signed a contract for 3 years and half starting from January 2014.

Yedan made his debut with Burkina Faso in 2012. In November 2013, he was called up for the 2014 World Cup qualification match against Algeria on 19 November 2013.
