= Idrissa Kouyaté =

Ivorian footballer

Personal information
- Full name: Idrissa Kouyaté
- Date of birth: 27 April 1991 (age 35)
- Place of birth: Abidjan, Ivory Coast
- Height: 1.82 m (6 ft 0 in)
- Position: Forward

Senior career*
Years	Team	Apps	(Gls)
2008–2010	Africa Sports	14	(15)
2010–2016	CS Sfaxien	55	(16)
2016–2017	Dinamo Brest	16	(5)
2017–2018	Al-Ahed	22	(9)
2018	Akzhayik	3	(0)
2018	Monastir	9	(1)
2019	Al-Nahda	10	(6)
2019-2020	Pharco FC	5	(3)

International career
2010	Ivory Coast U20		
- * Club domestic league appearances and goals as of 31 December 2018

Idrissa Kouyaté (born 27 April 1991) is an Ivorian former professional footballer who played as a forward.
