= Fakhreddine Ben Youssef =

Tunisian footballer (born 1991)

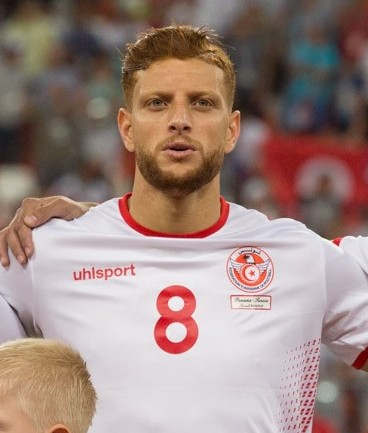
- Ben Youssef lining up with Tunisia at the 2018 FIFA World Cup

Personal information
- Full name: Fakhreddine Ben Youssef
- Date of birth: 23 June 1991 (age 35)
- Place of birth: Tunis, Tunisia
- Height: 1.89 m (6 ft 2 in)
- Position: Striker

Team information
- Current team: Stade Tunisien
- Number: 11

Senior career*
Years	Team	Apps	(Gls)
2011–2015	CS Sfaxien	73	(13)
2015	→ Metz (loan)	6	(0)
2015	→ Metz B (loan)	2	(0)
2015–2018	ES Tunis	41	(17)
2018–2020	Al-Ettifaq	27	(5)
2020–2021	Al-Ismaily	34	(13)
2021–2023	Pyramids	45	(7)
2023–2025	Al-Masry	43	(8)
2025–2026	US Monastir	19	(5)
2026-	Stade Tunisien	0	(0)

International career
2012–2019	Tunisia	47	(6)
Medal record
Representing Tunisia
Men's football
FIFA Arab Cup
Runner-up	2021 Qatar
- * Club domestic league appearances and goals as of 30 July 2026

Fakhreddine Ben Youssef (Arabic: فَخْر الدِّين بْن يُوسُف; born 23 June 1991) is a Tunisian footballer who plays as a striker for Stade Tunisien.

== Club career ==
Ben Youssef started his career playing for CS Sfaxien, in which he was loaned out to Metz. He then played for ES Tunis, before joining Saudi club Al-Ettifaq. He later had chosen to terminate his contract with his team Al-Ettifaq. In January 2020, he joined Egyptian club Al-Ismaily, then he rejoined them in November after being a free agent since summer, before moving to the newly founded Pyramids FC in 2021.

== International career ==
Ben Youssef was a member of the Tunisian squad at the 2013 Africa Cup of Nations.

In June 2018, he was named in Tunisia's 23-man squad for the 2018 FIFA World Cup in Russia. He scored an equalizer in Tunisia's last group stage match against Panama. This goal was the 2,500th goal in FIFA World Cup history.

== Career statistics ==
=== Club ===
As of match played on 17 July 2019

Appearances and goals by club, season and competition
Club	Season	League			Cup		League Cup		Other		Total	
Club	Season	Division	Apps	Goals	Apps	Goals	Apps	Goals	Apps	Goals	Apps	Goals
CS Sfaxien	2011–12	Tunisian Ligue Professionnelle 1	14	3	0	0	—				14	3
CS Sfaxien	2012–13	Tunisian Ligue Professionnelle 1	20	1	1	1	—				21	2
CS Sfaxien	2013–14	Tunisian Ligue Professionnelle 1	26	4	0	0	—		4	4	30	8
CS Sfaxien	2014–15	Tunisian Ligue Professionnelle 1	13	5	0	0	—		8	5	21	10
CS Sfaxien	Total		73	13	1	1	0	0	12	9	86	23
Metz	2014–15	Ligue 1	6	0	0	0	—				6	0
Metz B	2014–15	CFA	2	0	—						2	0
ES Tunis	2015–16	Tunisian Ligue Professionnelle 1	19	8	1	1	—		1	1	21	10
ES Tunis	2016–17	Tunisian Ligue Professionnelle 1	10	5	0	0	—				10	5
ES Tunis	2017–18	Tunisian Ligue Professionnelle 1	12	4	0	0	—		12	1	24	5
ES Tunis	Total		41	17	1	1	0	0	13	2	55	20
Al-Ettifaq	2017–18	Saudi Professional League	8	4	0	0	—				8	4
Al-Ettifaq	2018–19	Saudi Professional League	19	1	1	2	—				20	3
Al-Ettifaq	Total		27	5	1	2	0	0	0	0	28	7
Career totals			149	35	3	4	0	0	25	11	177	50

=== International ===
As of 17 July 2019

Appearances and goals by national team and year
National team	Year	Apps	Goals
Tunisia	2012	3	1
Tunisia	2013	10	1
Tunisia	2014	8	1
Tunisia	2015	6	1
Tunisia	2016	0	0
Tunisia	2017	7	0
Tunisia	2018	12	2
Tunisia	2019	1	0
Total		47	6

Scores and results list Tunisia's goal tally first, score column indicates score after each Ben Youssef goal.

List of international goals scored by Fakhreddine Ben Youssef
No.	Date	Venue	Opponent	Score	Result	Competition
1	30 December 2012	Sharjah Stadium, Sharjah, United Arab Emirates	Iraq	2–0	2–1	Friendly
2	8 June 2013	National Stadium, Freetown, Sierra Leone	Sierra Leone	2–2	2–2	2014 FIFA World Cup qualification
3	10 September 2014	30 June Stadium, Cairo, Egypt	Egypt	1–0	1–0	2015 Africa Cup of Nations qualification
4	12 June 2015	Stade Olympique de Radès, Radès, Tunisia	Djibouti	6–1	8–1	2017 Africa Cup of Nations qualification
5	28 May 2018	Estádio Municipal, Braga, Portugal	Portugal	2–2	2–2	Friendly
6	28 June 2018	Mordovia Arena, Saransk, Russia	Panama	1–1	2–1	2018 FIFA World Cup
