= List of football clubs in Rwanda =

The following is an incomplete list of association football clubs based in Rwanda. For a complete list see Category:Football clubs in Rwanda

== A ==
- Amagaju (Nyamagabe)
- APR FC (Kigali)
- AS Kigali (Kigali)
- ATRACO FC (Kigali)

== E ==
- Electrogaz FC
- Espérance F.C. (Kigali)
- Espoir FC (Rusizi)
- Etincelles FC (Rubavu)

== G ==
- Gicumbi F.C.
- Gorilla F.C. (Rwanda)

== I ==
- Isonga FC (Kigali)

== L ==
- La Jeunesse FC (Kigali)

== M ==
- Marines FC (Rubavu)
- Muhanga FC (Muhanga)
- Mukura Victory Sports FC (Huye)
- Musanze FC

== N ==
- Nyanza F.C.

== P ==
- Panthères Noires
- Police FC (Kigali)

== R ==
- Rayon Sport (Nyanza)
- Rutsiro FC (Rutsiro)

== S ==
- SC Kiyovu Sport (Kigali)
