= 2018 Rwandan Cup =

Tournament details
- Country: Rwanda

he 2017–18 Rwandan Cup is the 36th season of the football cup competition of Rwanda. The competition is organized by the Rwandese Association Football Federation (RAF) and open to all clubs in Rwanda.

== Preliminary round ==
The preliminary round are played on 30 January 2018.

30 January 2018	Aspor FC	0–1	Unity FC	Mumena

30 January 2018	Kirehe FC	1–0	Interforce FC	Rwamagana

30 January 2018	Etoile de l' Est	3–0	SEC FC	Rwamagana

30 January 2018	Hope FC	3–1	Nyagatare FC	Mumena

30 January 2018	Heroes FC	1–0	Gitikinyoni FC	Kicukiro

30 January 2018	Pepiniere FC	3–2	Gasabo United	Amahoro Stadium, Kigali

30 January 2018	Vision FC	3–0	Rugende FC

30 January 2018	United Stars	4–0	Akagera FC	Kigali

30 January 2018	Intare FC	0–0 (5–3 p)	Vision JN FC	Ubworoherane

30 January 2018	Rwamagana City FC	0–1	Espérance	Kicukiro

== Play-off round ==
The Play-off round are played on 3 February 2018.

3 February 2018	Vision JN	0–2	Sorwathe FC	Musanze

3 February 2018	Gasabo United	3–0	Akagera FC	Rwamagana

3 February 2018	Aspor FC	2–0	SEC FC

3 February 2018	Interforce FC	2–1	Rugende FC	Kicukiro

3 February 2018	Giticyinyoni FC	2–1	UR FC	Muhanga

3 February 2018	Rwamagana City FC	3–0	Nyagatare FC	Rwamagana

== Round of 32 ==
The Round of 32 are played on 6 & 7 February 2018 first legs and 21 & 22 February 2018 second legs.

First leg

6 February 2018	Giticyinyoni FC	1–4	APR	Kigali

6 February 2018	Rwamagana City FC	1–1	Amagaju	Rwamagana

6 February 2018	Gasabo United	0–2	AS Kigali

6 February 2018	Unity FC	0–0	Bugesera FC	Indera

6 February 2018	Heroes FC	0–4	Musanze	Kicukiro

6 February 2018	Espérance	2–6	Kiyovu Sports	Mumena

7 February 2018	Sorwathe FC	0–1	Espoir	Kinihira

7 February 2018	Aspor FC	0–5	Rayon Sports	Kigali

7 February 2018	Intare FC	1–2	Marines	Kicukiro

7 February 2018	Pepiniere FC	2–1	Gicumbi	Ruyenzi

7 February 2018	Hope FC	0–0	Mukura Victory Sports	Rutsiro

7 February 2018	Vision FC	1–1	AS Muhanga	Mumena

7 February 2018	Etoile de l’est FC	0–1	Etincelles	Ngoma

7 February 2018	Miroplast FC	0–0	Sunrise FC	Stade Mironko

7 February 2018	United Stars	0–0	La Jeunesse FC	Kabagali

Second legs

21 February 2018	Espoir	Cancelled	Sorwathe FC	Rusizi

1–0 on aggregate. Sorwathe FC failed to turn up for the game.

21 February 2018	Amagaju	3–0	Rwamagana FC	Nyagisenyi

Amagaju won with 4–1 on aggregate.

21 February 2018	AS Kigali	4–1	Gasabo United	Kigali

AS Kigali won with 6–1 on aggregate.

21 February 2018	Marines	0–1	Intare FC	Stade Umuganda, Gisenyi

2–2 on aggregate. Marines qualifies on Away goal rule.

21 February 2018	Police	1–0	Kirehe FC	Kicukiro

Police won with 3–1 on aggregate.

21 February 2018	Bugesera FC	2–0	Unity FC	Bugesera

Bugesera won with 2–0 on aggregate.

21 February 2018	Musanze	4–1	Heroes FC	Stade Ubworoherane, Musanze

Musanze won with 8–1 on aggregate.

21 February 2018	Kiyovu Sports	5–1	Espérance	Mumena

Kiyovu Sports won with 11–3 on aggregate.

21 February 2018	Mukura Victory Sports	3–0	Hope FC	Stade Huye, Butare

Mukura Victory Sports won with 3–0 on aggregate.

22 February 2018	Gicumbi	0–2	Pepiniere FC	Gicumbi

Pepiniere won with 4–1 on aggregate.

22 February 2018	AS Muhanga	1–0	Vision FC	Stade Muhanga, Muhanga

AS Muhanga won with 2–1 on aggregate.

22 February 2018	Etincelles	3–0	Etoile de l’est FC	Umuganda Stadium, Gisenyi

Etincelles won with 4–0 on aggregate.

22 February 2018	Sunrise FC	3–0	Miroplast FC	Nyagatare

Sunrise won with 3–0 on aggregate, after Miroplast failed to turn up for the game.

22 February 2018	La Jeunesse FC	0–0 (5–4 p)	United Stars FC	Stade Mumena, Kigali

0–0 on aggregate. La Jeunesse won 5–4, after penalties.

== Round of 16 ==
First Legs

[Apr 2]

Mukura 3-2 AS Kigali

Pepinière 0-1 Marines

Espoir 2-1 Sunrise

[Apr 3]

La Jeunesse 0-3 APR

AS Muhanga 2-1 Amagaju

Musanze 2-1 Police

[Apr 4]

Kiyovu Sports 1-1 Bugesera

[Apr 25]

Etincelles 1-1 Rayon Sports

Second Legs

[Apr 5]

AS Kigali 1-2 Mukura

Sunrise 2-0 Espoir

Marines 1-0 Pepinière

[Apr 6]

Police 3-0 Musanze

Bugesera 0-0 Kiyovu Sports

APR 0-0 La Jeunesse

Amagaju 1-0 AS Muhanga

[May 23]

Rayon Sports 2-0 Etincelles

== Quarter-finals ==
First Legs

[Jul 20]

Sunrise 2-0 Bugesera

Mukura 1-0 Amagaju

Police 0-0 APR

[Jul 21]

Marines 0-1 Rayon Sports

Second Legs

[Jul 23]

Amagaju 0-0 Mukura

Bugesera 1-0 Sunrise

[Jul 24]

Rayon Sports 3-1 Marines

[Jul 26]

APR 3-0 Police

== Semi-finals ==
First Legs

[Aug 3]

Mukura 0-0 APR

[Aug 6]

Sunrise 2-1 Rayon Sports

Second Legs

[Aug 8]

APR 1-1 Mukura

[Aug 9]

Rayon Sports 2-0 Sunrise

== Third place match ==
[Aug 12]

Sunrise 0-1 APR

== Final ==
[Aug 12]

Mukura Victory Sports 0-0 (aet, 3-1 pen) Rayon Sport
