= 2015–16 Rwanda National Football League =

Rwanda National Football League
- Season: 2015–16
- Champions: APR
- Relegated: Muhanga; Rwamagana City
- 2017 CAF Champions League: APR
- 2017 CAF Confederation Cup: Rayon Sports
- Matches: 240
- Goals: 502 (2.09 per match)
- Biggest home win: Rayon Sports 6-0 Amagaju (15 June 2016)
- Biggest away win: 3 matches: Muhanga 1-5 Police (4 November 2015); APR 0-4 Rayon Sports (3 May 2016); Bugesera 0-4 Rayon Sports (11 May 2016)
- Highest scoring: Kiyovu Sports 4-3 Gicumbi (2 March 2016)
- Longest winning run: Kiyovu Sports; Mukura (7)
- Longest unbeaten run: Rayon Sports (24)
- Longest winless run: Muhanga; Rwamagana City (16)
- Longest losing run: Etincelles; Muhanga (5)
- All statistics correct as of 17 July 2016.

The 2015–16 Rwanda National Football League, known as the Azam Rwanda Premier League for sponsorship reasons, is the 39th season of top-tier football in Rwanda. The season started on 18 September 2015 and concluded on 17 July 2016 with APR winning their third consecutive title and 16th overall, all in a span of 22 years.

Rayon Sports finished second to qualify for the 2017 CAF Confederation Cup while Rwamagana City and Muhanga finished 15th and 16th, respectively, and will be relegated to the Rwandan Second Division for the 2016–17 season.

== Teams ==
A total of 16 teams will contest the league after it expanded from 14 teams in 2014–15. Isonga were relegated to the Second Division after finishing 14th. Bugesera, Muhanga and Rwamagana City are all new additions to the competition this year.

=== Stadiums and locations ===
Locations of the 2015-16 Rwanda National Football League teams

Team	Home city	Stadium	Capacity
Amagaju F.C.	Gikongoro	Stade ya Nyamagabe	1,000
Armée Patriotique Rwandaise F.C.	Kigali	Stade Régional de Nyamirambo	22,000
AS Kigali	Kigali	Stade Régional de Nyamirambo	22,000
Bugesera FC	Nyamata	ETO Nyamata Ground	1,000
Espoir F.C.	Cyangugu	Cyangugu Regional Stadium	3,000
Etincelles F.C.	Gisenyi	Stade Umuganda	5,000
Gicumbi F.C.	Byumba	Gicumbi Stadium	6,000
S.C. Kiyovu Sports	Kigali	Stade Mumena	1,200
Marines	Gisenyi	Stade Umuganda	5,000
AS Muhanga	Gitarama	Muhanga Regional Stadium	5,000
Mukura Victory Sports F.C.	Butare	Kamena Stadium	2,000
Musanze F.C.	Musanze	Ubworoherane Football Stadium	4,000
Police F.C.	Kigali	Stade Kicukiro	1,000
Rayon Sports F.C.	Kigali	Stade Régional de Nyamirambo	22,000
Rwamagana City FC	Rwamagana	Rwamagana Playground	1,000
Sunrise FC Rwamagana	Rwamagana	Rwamagana Playground	1,000

== League table ==
Pos	Team	Pld	W	D	L	GF	GA	GD	Pts	Qualification or relegation
1	APR (C, Q)	30	21	4	5	43	18	+25	67	2017 CAF Champions League
2	Rayon Sports (Q)	30	17	10	3	50	12	+38	61	2017 CAF Confederation Cup
3	Mukura	30	19	3	8	44	25	+19	60	
4	AS Kigali	30	16	8	6	44	20	+24	56	
5	Police	30	14	10	6	47	26	+21	52	
6	Kiyovu Sports	30	14	6	10	37	32	+5	48	
7	Bugesera	30	10	7	13	23	35	−12	37	
8	Sunrise	30	8	10	12	28	34	−6	34	
9	Gicumbi	30	8	10	12	26	38	−12	34	
10	Marines	30	7	12	11	19	28	−9	33	
11	Espoir	30	7	12	11	20	33	−13	33	
12	Etincelles	30	8	8	14	29	41	−12	32	
13	Amagaju	30	6	12	12	20	38	−18	30	
14	Musanze	30	7	8	15	28	40	−12	29	
15	Rwamagana City (R)	30	6	7	17	20	32	−12	25	Relegation to Rwandan Second Division
16	Muhanga (R)	30	5	7	18	24	50	−26	22	Relegation to Rwandan Second Division

Updated to match(es) played on 17 July 2016. Source: Soccerway.com
Rules for classification: 1) points; 2) goal difference; 3) total goals; 4) head-to-head points; 5) head-to-head goal difference; 6) head-to-head goals scored; 7) playoff
(C) Champions; (Q) Qualified for the phase indicated; (R) Relegated

== Results ==
All teams play in a double round robin system (home and away).

Home \ Away	AMA	APR	ASK	BUG	ESP	ETI	GIC	KIY	MAR	MUH	MUK	MUS	POL	RAY	RWA	SUN
Amagaju		0–1	1–1	1–0	2–1	0–0	0–0	0–2	0–0	1–0	1–2	1–0	1–1	0–2	1–1	0–0
APR	2–1		1–2	2–0	2–0	0–1	3–0	2–0	0–0	3–1	0–2	2–0	2–1	0–4	1–0	1–0
AS Kigali	2–0	1–3		4–0	2–0	3–2	1–1	0–0	1–0	1–0	0–2	4–0	0–2	1–1	0–0	4–1
Bugesera	0–0	0–1	1–1		2–0	2–1	3–0	0–0	1–0	2–1	1–0	1–1	2–0	0–4	1–0	2–1
Espoir	0–0	1–0	0–3	1–0		0–1	1–0	1–1	1–1	0–0	0–0	1–0	0–0	0–0	0–0	2–1
Etincelles	2–0	0–1	2–4	3–0	1–1		0–2	2–0	1–1	1–0	1–1	0–3	1–1	0–0	2–1	2–1
Gicumbi	0–0	0–0	1–0	0–1	2–1	1–0		0–3	1–0	4–1	1–1	1–1	0–3	0–2	1–2	2–1
Kiyovu Sports	2–0	0–2	0–1	3–2	1–0	3–1	4–3		2–0	2–2	0–1	3–1	2–1	0–2	0–1	3–2
Marines	1–1	0–1	0–3	0–0	0–0	1–0	1–1	1–2		0–0	2–0	0–0	2–1	0–2	2–1	1–0
Muhanga	4–1	0–3	0–2	0–0	1–2	3–1	2–1	1–2	0–2		1–3	0–2	1–5	1–0	1–1	1–1
Mukura	3–2	1–2	1–0	1–0	5–1	1–0	3–0	2–0	2–1	3–1		3–2	1–2	0–1	2–1	2–1
Musanze	1–2	0–3	0–1	3–1	2–1	1–1	1–0	0–0	1–1	1–2	0–1		2–2	2–0	0–0	0–1
Police	3–1	1–1	1–0	3–0	3–1	4–0	1–1	1–1	2–0	2–0	1–0	2–1		1–1	0–0	0–1
Rayon Sports	6–0	0–0	1–2	1–0	1–1	1–1	1–1	2–0	3–0	0–0	2–0	3–0	3–1		4–1	2–0
Rwamagana City	0–2	1–2	0–0	2–0	1–2	2–0	0–1	0–1	1–2	1–0	0–1	1–2	0–1	0–1		1–0
Sunrise	1–1	1–2	0–0	1–1	1–1	2–2	1–1	1–0	0–0	3–0	1–0	2–1	1–1	0–0	2–1	

Updated to match(es) played on 17 July 2016. Source: soccerway.com
Legend: Blue = home team win; Yellow = draw; Red = away team win.

=== Results by round ===
Team ╲ Round	1	2	3	4	5	6	7	8	9	10	11	12	13	14	15	16	17	18	19	20	21	22	23	24	25	26	27	28	29	30
Amagaju	D	W	L	W	D	W	D	L	D	L	D	L	W	L	D	D	L	L	D	W	W	D	D	L	L	L	L	D	L	D
APR	W	L	D	W	W	D	W	D	W	W	W	W	W	D	W	L	W	W	W	W	L	W	W	W	W	L	W	W	W	L
AS Kigali	D	W	W	D	W	D	W	W	W	W	D	W	L	L	L	D	D	D	L	W	W	W	D	W	W	W	W	L	L	W
Bugesera	D	L	W	L	D	L	D	L	W	D	D	W	W	D	W	L	W	L	L	L	W	L	L	D	W	L	W	L	W	L
Espoir	W	D	L	L	W	D	L	D	D	L	L	D	D	W	L	D	L	W	D	L	D	L	L	L	D	W	W	D	D	W
Etincelles	L	L	D	D	L	W	L	D	D	L	L	L	L	L	D	W	W	D	W	L	L	W	W	W	D	D	L	W	D	L
Gicumbi	D	L	W	D	W	D	D	D	W	L	D	L	W	L	W	D	D	D	W	W	L	L	L	L	D	W	L	L	L	L
Kiyovu Sports	D	D	W	D	W	D	W	L	D	L	W	L	L	W	W	W	W	W	W	W	L	L	L	W	L	L	L	W	W	D
Marines	L	W	L	D	L	D	D	D	L	L	W	L	W	D	W	L	D	D	W	L	D	D	D	D	L	D	W	L	L	W
Muhanga	L	L	L	D	L	L	L	L	L	D	D	L	L	D	L	D	W	W	L	L	W	L	L	L	L	W	D	W	L	D
Mukura	L	W	W	L	W	D	W	W	D	W	W	W	W	W	L	L	L	W	L	L	W	W	W	W	W	W	L	W	D	W
Musanze	L	W	W	D	L	L	D	D	L	W	L	L	L	W	L	L	D	L	L	W	L	W	D	L	D	L	D	L	D	W
Police	W	W	D	W	D	D	D	W	D	W	D	W	L	W	D	W	L	L	D	L	L	W	W	L	D	W	D	W	W	W
Rayon Sports	W	L	D	W	D	D	W	W	W	W	D	W	D	W	W	W	D	D	W	W	W	W	W	D	D	L	W	D	W	L
Rwamagana City	D	W	L	L	L	W	L	L	L	D	L	D	L	L	L	D	L	L	D	L	L	L	W	W	W	W	L	D	D	L
Sunrise	W	L	L	D	L	D	L	W	L	D	D	W	W	L	D	W	D	D	L	W	W	L	L	D	L	L	D	L	D	D

Updated to match(es) played on 17 July 2016. Source: Soccerway
W = Win; D = Draw; L = Lose

== Positions by round ==
Team ╲ Round	1	2	3	4	5	6	7	8	9	10	11	12	13	14	15	16	17	18	19	20	21	22	23	24	25	26	27	28	29	30
APR	5	10	10	5	3	3	2	5	3	4	5	4	4	3	1	2	1	1	1	1	1	1	1	1	1	1	1	1	1	1
Rayon Sports	1	6	6	3	6	7	6	4	2	2	3	3	3	4	2	1	2	2	2	2	2	2	2	2	2	2	2	3	2	2
Mukura	12	6	3	8	5	6	5	3	5	3	2	2	1	1	3	3	3	3	4	4	3	3	3	3	3	3	3	2	3	3
AS Kigali	6	4	1	2	1	1	1	1	1	1	1	1	2	2	4	5	5	5	6	5	5	4	4	4	4	4	4	4	4	4
Police	2	1	1	1	2	2	4	2	4	5	4	5	5	5	5	4	4	6	5	6	6	6	5	6	6	5	5	6	6	5
Kiyovu Sports	6	12	5	7	4	5	3	6	6	6	6	6	7	6	6	6	6	4	3	3	4	5	6	5	5	6	6	5	5	6
Bugesera	6	14	10	14	11	15	13	15	11	12	11	9	8	9	8	9	7	9	9	9	9	9	10	10	9	9	8	8	7	7
Sunrise	2	8	14	13	13	12	14	11	12	10	10	8	9	8	9	8	9	8	8	8	8	8	7	7	7	8	9	9	9	8
Gicumbi	6	13	8	9	7	8	8	8	7	7	7	7	6	7	7	7	8	7	7	7	7	7	8	8	8	7	7	7	8	9
Marines	16	10	13	12	14	14	12	13	14	14	12	13	12	13	13	13	11	10	10	11	11	11	11	11	11	12	13	13	13	10
Espoir	2	3	9	11	10	9	10	10	9	11	13	12	13	12	12	11	13	12	12	12	12	13	14	14	14	13	12	12	11	11
Etincelles	15	16	15	15	15	13	15	14	15	15	15	15	15	15	15	15	14	14	14	14	14	14	13	12	12	10	10	11	10	12
Amagaju	6	5	12	6	8	4	7	7	8	8	8	10	10	10	10	10	10	11	11	10	10	10	9	9	10	11	11	10	12	13
Musanze	12	9	4	4	9	11	9	9	10	9	9	11	11	11	11	12	12	13	13	13	13	12	12	13	13	14	14	14	14	14
Rwamagana City	6	2	6	10	12	10	11	12	13	13	14	14	14	14	14	14	15	16	15	15	16	16	15	15	15	15	15	15	15	15
Muhanga	12	15	16	16	16	16	16	16	16	16	16	16	16	16	16	16	16	15	16	16	15	15	16	16	16	16	16	16	16	16

Leader and 2017 CAF Champions League
2017 CAF Confederation Cup
Relegation to Rwandan Second Division

Updated to match(es) played on 17 July 2016. Source: Soccerway
