= 2019–20 Rwanda Premier League =

Rwanda Premier League
- Season: 2019–20
- Champions: APR
- Relegated: Heroes; Gicumbi

The 2019–20 Rwanda Premier League was the 43rd season of the Rwanda Premier League, the top-tier football league in Rwanda. The season started on 4 October 2019.

The season was disrupted by the COVID-19 pandemic which forced games of round 24 to be played behind closed doors but before the round could be completed the league was abandoned on May 22. The standings after round 23 are considered final.

== Teams ==
A total of 16 teams compete in the 2019–20 season with the top team qualifying for the CAF Champions League, the runner-ups qualifying for the CAF Confederation Cup and the bottom two relegated to the Rwandan Second Division.

Locations of the 2019–20 Rwanda Premier League teams

== League table ==
| Pos | Team | Pld | W | D | L | GF | GA | GD | Pts | Qualification or relegation |
|---|---|---|---|---|---|---|---|---|---|---|
| 1 | APR | 23 | 17 | 6 | 0 | 44 | 11 | +33 | 57 | Qualification for Champions League |
| 2 | Rayon Sports | 23 | 15 | 5 | 3 | 37 | 15 | +22 | 50 | Qualification for Confederation Cup |
| 3 | Police | 23 | 12 | 7 | 4 | 33 | 21 | +12 | 43 | |
| 4 | Mukura | 23 | 11 | 5 | 7 | 35 | 28 | +7 | 38 | |
| 5 | Kiyovu Sports | 23 | 10 | 5 | 8 | 30 | 20 | +10 | 35 | |
| 6 | AS Kigali | 23 | 7 | 12 | 4 | 21 | 20 | +1 | 33 | |
| 7 | Sunrise | 23 | 7 | 9 | 7 | 37 | 33 | +4 | 30 | |
| 8 | Bugesera | 23 | 8 | 6 | 9 | 30 | 30 | 0 | 30 | |
| 9 | Gasogi United | 23 | 7 | 8 | 8 | 22 | 23 | −1 | 29 | |
| 10 | Marines | 23 | 7 | 7 | 9 | 18 | 24 | −6 | 28 | |
| 11 | Musanze | 23 | 5 | 11 | 7 | 22 | 28 | −6 | 26 | |
| 12 | Muhanga | 23 | 7 | 6 | 10 | 15 | 21 | −6 | 27 | |
| 13 | Etincelles | 23 | 5 | 9 | 9 | 19 | 25 | −6 | 24 | |
| 14 | Espoir | 23 | 4 | 5 | 14 | 20 | 40 | −20 | 17 | |
| 15 | Heroes | 23 | 4 | 4 | 15 | 17 | 41 | −24 | 16 | Relegation to Rwandan Second Division |
| 16 | Gicumbi | 23 | 4 | 3 | 16 | 18 | 38 | −20 | 15 | Relegation to Rwandan Second Division |

Updated to match(es) played on 21 April 2021. Source: Soccerway
Rules for classification: 1) Points; 2) Goal difference; 3) Goals scored; 4) Head-to-head points; 5) Head-to-head goal difference; 6) Head-to-head goals scored; 7) Play-off

== Results ==
| Home \ Away | APR | ASK | BUG | ESP | ETI | GAS | GIC | HER | KIY | MAR | MUH | MUK | MUS | POL | RAY | SUN |
|---|---|---|---|---|---|---|---|---|---|---|---|---|---|---|---|---|
| APR | — | 0–0 | 2–1 | 3–1 | 3–0 | 3–2 | | | 1–0 | 3–0 | 2–0 | 1–0 | 5–0 | 1–0 | 2–0 | |
| AS Kigali | 1–1 | — | 2–2 | | 2–0 | | 1–2 | 1–0 | 0–0 | 1–0 | 1–0 | 2–2 | | 0–3 | 0–0 | 2–2 |
| Bugesera | 0–1 | 0–0 | — | 2–0 | 0–2 | 1–1 | | 2–0 | | 0–1 | 5–4 | 1–0 | 0–0 | 3–1 | 0–1 | |
| Espoir | | 0–1 | | — | 2–3 | 3–2 | 0–1 | 1–1 | 0–1 | | 0–0 | 1–2 | 2–1 | | 1–2 | 0–5 |
| Etincelles | 1–1 | 0–0 | 1–3 | | — | 2–1 | 2–2 | 0–1 | 2–1 | 0–1 | 0–0 | | | 0–1 | 1–2 | 0–0 |
| Gasogi United | | 1–1 | | 1–0 | | — | 1–0 | | 1–1 | 1–0 | 2–0 | 0–1 | 1–1 | 0–0 | 0–0 | 4–2 |
| Gicumbi | 1–1 | | 1–2 | 2–1 | | | — | 2–2 | 1–3 | 1–2 | 0–1 | 1–3 | 0–3 | 0–1 | 0–1 | 0–1 |
| Heroes | 0–1 | | 0–1 | 2–3 | 0–3 | 0–1 | | — | 0–5 | 0–0 | 2–1 | 0–1 | 3–2 | 1–3 | 1–4 | 2–2 |
| Kiyovu Sports | 0–0 | | 5–2 | 0–1 | 0–0 | 0–1 | 1–0 | 2–1 | — | 1–2 | | | 1–0 | 1–3 | 0–1 | 1–0 |
| Marines | 1–2 | 1–2 | 1–1 | 0–0 | 1–1 | 2–0 | 2–0 | 1–1 | | — | 0–1 | 0–0 | 1–0 | | 0–1 | |
| Muhanga | 0–2 | 0–0 | 1–0 | | 1–0 | 0–0 | 0–1 | 0–1 | 1–0 | | — | | 1–1 | 1–0 | | 0–0 |
| Mukura | 0–4 | 3–1 | 2–1 | 1–1 | 3–1 | 2–1 | 3–0 | 1–0 | 2–4 | | 0–1 | — | 4–0 | | | 4–1 |
| Musanze | | 1–1 | | 1–1 | 0–0 | 0–0 | 2–0 | | 1–1 | | 2–1 | 1–0 | — | 0–0 | 1–1 | 1–1 |
| Police | 1–1 | 0–2 | 2–1 | 2–1 | | 2–0 | 3–2 | 2–0 | | 1–0 | | 2–2 | 1–1 | — | | 3–2 |
| Rayon Sports | | 2–0 | 2–1 | 3–0 | 0–0 | 1–0 | 1–1 | | | 6–1 | 2–1 | 5–1 | 2–1 | 0–0 | — | 0–2 |
| Sunrise | 2–4 | | 2–2 | 4–0 | | 1–1 | 2–1 | 4–1 | 0–2 | 1–1 | | | 1–2 | 2–2 | 2–1 | — |

Updated to match(es) played on 14 March 2020. Source: soccerway.com
Legend: Blue = home team win; Yellow = draw; Red = away team win.

== Stadiums ==
| Team | Location | Stadium | Capacity |
|---|---|---|---|
| APR F.C. | Kigali | Nyamirambo Regional Stadium | 22,000 |
| Rayon Sports F.C. | Kigali | Nyamirambo Regional Stadium | 22,000 |
| Police F.C. (Rwanda) | Kigali | Nyamirambo Regional Stadium | 22,000 |
| Mukura Victory Sports F.C. | Butare | Stade Huye | 10,000 |
| S.C. Kiyovu Sports | Kigali | Mumena Stadium | 5,000 |
| AS Kigali FC | Kigali | Nyamirambo Regional Stadium | 22,000 |
| Sunrise F.C. | | | |
| Bugesera F.C. | | | |
| Gasogi United F.C. | | | |
| Marines F.C. | Gisenyi | Umuganda Stadium | 5,000 |
| Musanze F.C. | Musanze | Ubworoherane Football Stadium | 4,000 |
| A.S. Muhanga | Muhanga | Muhanga Regional Stadium | 5,000 |
| Etincelles F.C. | Gisenyi | Umuganda Stadium | 5,000 |
| Espoir F.C. (Rwanda) | Cyangugu | Rusizi Stadium | 4,000 |
| Heroes F.C. | | | |
| Gicumbi F.C. | Byumba | Gicumbi Stadium | 6,000 |
