= 2013–14 Rwanda National Football League =

Rwanda National Football League
- Season: 2013–14
- Champions: A.P.R.
- Relegated: Espérance; Muhanga
- Champions League: A.P.R.
- Confederation Cup: Police (cup runners-up)
- Matches: 182
- Goals: 423 (2.32 per match)
- Biggest home win: 4 matches: Police 6–0 Etincelles (30 October 2013); Kiyovu Sports 6–0 Musanze (19 January 2014); Police 6–0 Marines (4 May 2014)
- Biggest away win: Marines 0–5 Police (29 December 2013)
- Highest scoring: A.P.R. 6–2 Marines (29 September 2013)
- All statistics correct as of 4 May 2014.

The 2013–14 Rwanda National Football League (known as the Turbo King National Football League for sponsorship reasons) was the 37th season of the Rwanda National Football League since it began play in 1975. The season began on 28 September 2013 and concluded on 4 May 2014. Rayon Sports were the defending champions, having won their 7th title the previous season against the Greely team.

Armée Patriotique Rwandaise (A.P.R.) won a record 14th title, having finished at the top of the table with 64 points, and represented Rwanda in the 2015 CAF Champions League.

== Participating teams ==
Locations of the 2013–14 Rwanda National Football League teams in Rwanda.

Team	Location
Amagaju	Gikongoro
AS Kigali	Kigali
A.P.R.	Kigali
Espoir	Cyangugu
Espérance	Kigali
Etincelles	Gisenyi
Gicumbi	Byumba
Kiyovu Sports	Kigali
Marines	Gisenyi
Muhanga	Gitarama
Mukura Victory	Butare
Musanze	Ruhengeri
Police	Kibungo
Rayon Sports	Butare

== League table ==
Pos	Team	Pld	W	D	L	GF	GA	GD	Pts	Qualification or relegation
1	A.P.R. (C, Q)	26	20	4	2	46	12	+34	64	Qualification for 2015 CAF Champions League
2	Rayon Sports	26	20	2	4	56	22	+34	62	
3	AS Kigali	26	13	9	4	31	18	+13	48	
4	Police	26	14	5	7	53	27	+26	47	Qualification for 2015 CAF Confederation Cup (Note: Police qualified for the 2015 CAF Confederation Cup as runners-up of the 2014 Rwandan Cup, having lost to league champions A.P.R. in the final.)
5	Kiyovu Sports	26	11	8	7	33	24	+9	41	
6	Espoir	26	10	9	7	27	23	+4	39	
7	Musanze	26	10	8	8	30	30	0	38	
8	Mukura Victory	26	8	5	13	29	32	−3	29	
9	Gicumbi	26	6	7	13	20	30	−10	25	
10	Etincelles	26	4	11	11	20	34	−14	23	
11	Amagaju	26	6	5	15	19	35	−16	23	
12	Marines	26	6	5	15	19	43	−24	23	
13	Espérance (R)	26	5	6	15	20	42	−22	21	Relegation to 2014–15 Rwandan Second Division
14	Muhanga (R)	26	4	6	16	20	51	−31	18	Relegation to 2014–15 Rwandan Second Division

Updated to match(es) played on 4 May 2014. Source: Rwanda National Football League
Rules for classification: 1) points; 2) goal difference; 3) number of goals scored.
(C) Champions; (Q) Qualified for the phase indicated; (R) Relegated

== Results ==
Home \ Away	AGJ	APR	ASK	ESP	EFC	ETC	GCB	KVS	MRN	MHG	MKV	MSZ	POL	RYS
Amagaju		1–2	0–1	1–2	2–0	2–2	1–0	0–1	0–0	0–2	4–1	0–2	3–1	0–4
A.P.R.	3–0		0–1	3–1	0–0	1–0	1–0	2–1	6–2	3–0	1–0	1–0	1–0	1–0
AS Kigali	2–0	0–0		2–0	1–1	2–1	2–1	1–1	1–0	1–0	1–2	2–2	1–1	1–2
Espérance	0–1	0–2	1–1		2–1	0–2	0–1	0–1	1–0	2–1	1–1	2–3	1–2	0–4
Espoir	1–0	1–2	2–1	0–0		1–0	1–2	1–0	1–0	0–1	1–0	0–1	0–0	1–2
Etincelles	1–2	0–0	0–0	1–3	0–0		1–1	2–2	1–1	0–0	3–0	2–2	0–2	2–1
Gicumbi	0–0	0–4	0–1	0–0	0–3	2–0		0–2	0–0	3–0	0–1	2–1	1–1	1–2
Kiyovu Sports	3–0	0–2	1–2	0–0	1–1	2–1	1–1		1–1	2–0	1–0	6–0	2–0	0–0
Marines	2–1	0–3	0–1	2–0	1–2	1–0	2–1	0–1		2–0	1–0	0–2	0–5	1–2
Muhanga	1–1	1–3	0–1	1–1	2–2	0–0	1–0	1–2	1–0		0–4	0–3	2–5	2–4
Mukura Victory	0–0	0–1	1–0	3–2	2–2	0–1	1–1	3–0	1–1	3–1		1–2	1–2	1–3
Musanze	1–0	0–1	1–1	2–0	0–0	0–0	0–1	1–1	2–1	2–2	0–3		0–0	1–2
Police	1–0	2–2	0–3	2–1	2–3	6–0	2–1	2–0	6–0	6–1	2–0	0–1		1–2
Rayon Sports	2–0	2–1	1–1	5–0	1–2	3–0	2–1	3–1	4–1	1–0	1–0	2–1	1–2	

Updated to match(es) played on 4 May 2014. Source: Rwanda National Football League
Legend: Blue = home team win; Yellow = draw; Red = away team win.
