= 2018–19 Rwanda Premier League =

Rwanda Premier League
- Season: 2018–19
- Champions: Rayon Sports

The 2018–19 Rwanda Premier League is the 42nd season of the Rwanda Premier League, the top-tier football league in Rwanda. The season started on 19 October 2018.

== League table ==
| Pos | Team | Pld | W | D | L | GF | GA | GD | Pts | Qualification or relegation |
|---|---|---|---|---|---|---|---|---|---|---|
| 1 | Rayon Sports (C) | 30 | 23 | 3 | 4 | 53 | 14 | +39 | 72 | Qualification for Champions League |
| 2 | APR | 30 | 20 | 5 | 5 | 47 | 17 | +30 | 65 | |
| 3 | Mukura Victory Sports | 30 | 17 | 8 | 5 | 38 | 22 | +16 | 59 | |
| 4 | Police | 30 | 15 | 5 | 10 | 45 | 33 | +12 | 50 | |
| 5 | Kiyovu Sports | 30 | 12 | 7 | 11 | 31 | 21 | +10 | 43 | |
| 6 | Espoir | 30 | 11 | 7 | 12 | 33 | 41 | −8 | 40 | |
| 7 | Kigali (Q) | 30 | 9 | 12 | 9 | 38 | 30 | +8 | 39 | Qualification for Confederation Cup (Note: Kigali are Rwandan Cup winners.) |
| 8 | Etincelles | 30 | 11 | 4 | 15 | 25 | 29 | −4 | 37 | |
| 9 | Muhanga | 30 | 9 | 9 | 12 | 41 | 41 | 0 | 36 | |
| 10 | Musanze | 30 | 10 | 6 | 14 | 26 | 38 | −12 | 36 | |
| 11 | Marines | 30 | 8 | 11 | 11 | 20 | 24 | −4 | 35 | |
| 12 | Bugesera | 30 | 8 | 11 | 11 | 30 | 42 | −12 | 35 | |
| 13 | Sunrise | 30 | 8 | 10 | 12 | 28 | 35 | −7 | 34 | |
| 14 | Gicumbi | 30 | 8 | 7 | 15 | 20 | 43 | −23 | 31 | |
| 15 | Kirehe | 30 | 6 | 9 | 15 | 17 | 38 | −21 | 27 | Relegation |
| 16 | Amagaju | 30 | 5 | 6 | 19 | 22 | 46 | −24 | 21 | Relegation |

Source: Soccerway
Rules for classification: 1) Points; 2) Goal difference; 5) Goals scored
(C) Champions; (Q) Qualified for the phase indicated
