= 2014–15 Rwanda National Football League =

Rwanda Premier League
- Season: 2014–15
- Champions: APR
- Matches: 182
- Goals: 337 (1.85 per match)

The 2014–15 Rwanda National Football League was the 38th season of top-flight football in Rwanda.

APR F.C. won their second title in a row and record 15th title with one game to spare, in spite of being held 2–2 by relegated Isonga in the clinching match.

Only one team was relegated as the league expanded to 16 teams for the 2015–16 season.

== League Table ==
Pos	Team	Pld	W	D	L	GF	GA	GD	Pts	Qualification or relegation
1	APR (C)	26	15	7	4	43	18	+25	52	Champions, Qualification to the 2016 CAF Champions League
2	AS Kigali	26	14	7	5	35	17	+18	49	
3	Police	26	12	10	4	30	16	+14	46	Qualification to the 2016 CAF Confederation Cup
4	Sunrise	26	10	10	6	25	17	+8	40	
5	Rayon Sports	26	10	11	5	36	25	+11	41	
6	Gicumbi	26	8	12	6	17	16	+1	36	
7	Espoir	26	9	7	10	14	20	−6	34	
8	Amagaju	26	8	8	10	27	27	0	32	
9	Kiyovu Sports	26	8	8	10	26	37	−11	32	
10	Mukura Victory	26	6	11	9	22	27	−5	29	
11	Marines	26	7	8	11	21	28	−7	29	
12	Musanze	26	7	7	12	14	19	−5	28	
13	Etincelles	26	3	9	14	13	32	−19	18	
14	Isonga (R)	26	3	9	14	14	38	−24	18	Relegation

Source: soccerway.com
Rules for classification: 1) points; 2) goal difference; 3) number of goals scored.
(C) Champions; (R) Relegated
