= 2021–22 Rwanda Premier League =

Rwanda Premier League
- Season: 2021–22
- Champions: APR
- Champions League: APR
- Confederation Cup: AS Kigali
- Matches: 240
- Goals: 510 (2.13 per match)
- Top goalscorer: Shabani Hussein (AS Kigali, 15 goals)

The 2021–22 Rwanda Premier League was a season of the Rwanda Premier League, the top-tier football league in Rwanda.

APR FC won their third consecutive league title on the last day of the season, defeating Police 2–0 with two second half goals to claim the top spot over Kiyovu Sports.

== League Changes ==
Etoile de l'Est and Gicumbi FC were promoted after qualifying to the second division play-off final, replacing Sunrise and AS Muhanga. Etoile de L'Est returned to the top flight after a 24-year absence.

== League Table ==
Pos	Team	Pld	W	D	L	GF	GA	GD	Pts	Qualification or relegation
1	APR (C)	30	20	6	4	42	18	+24	66	Champions, Qualification to the 2023–24 CAF Champions League
2	Kiyovu Sports	30	19	8	3	40	16	+24	65	
3	AS Kigali	30	12	13	5	43	27	+16	49	Qualification to the 2023–24 CAF Confederation Cup
4	Rayon Sports	30	12	12	6	33	28	+5	48	
5	Mukura Victory	30	12	11	7	32	23	+9	47	
6	Musanze	30	10	10	10	32	28	+4	40	
7	Police	30	10	10	10	36	33	+3	40	
8	Bugesera	30	9	10	11	33	33	0	37	
9	Marines	30	10	7	13	34	42	−8	37	
10	Espoir	30	8	11	11	27	35	−8	35	
11	Gasogi United	30	9	7	14	31	35	−4	34	
12	Etincelles	30	9	7	14	29	38	−9	34	
13	Gorilla	30	8	9	13	33	33	0	33	
14	Rutsiro	30	7	11	12	24	34	−10	32	
15	Etoile de l'Est (R)	30	6	10	14	25	44	−19	28	Relegation
16	Gicumbi (R)	30	2	12	16	16	43	−27	18	Relegation

Source: soccerway.com
Rules for classification: 1) points; 2) goal difference; 3) number of goals scored.
(C) Champions; (R) Relegated
