= 2020–21 Rwanda Premier League =

Rwanda Premier League
- Season: 2020–21
- Champions: APR
- Relegated: Sunrise; AS Muhanga
- Champions League: APR
- Confederation Cup: AS Kigali

The 2020–21 Rwanda Premier League is the 44th season of the Rwanda Premier League, the top-tier football league in Rwanda. The season started on 4 December 2020 with all games taking place behind closed doors before being suspended on 12 December due to the COVID-19 pandemic.

While the season originally started with a full round robin format, due to the pandemic the league switched to four groups of four teams, with the top two teams in each group qualifying to the champions round. APR won the title on goal difference over AS Kigali as both teams finished with 19 points out of a possible 21, with both teams drawing each other 1–1 on the second match day. Title celebrations were muted because of the pandemic.

Five teams were at risk of the last relegation spot on the final day of the season. Muhanga lost every single game in the relegation group and were relegated with matches to spare. Sunrise lost 2–1 to Gorilla FC on the final match day to be the final team relegated.

== Teams ==
A total of 16 teams competed in the 2020–21 season with the top team qualifying for the CAF Champions League, the runner-ups qualifying for the CAF Confederation Cup and the bottom two relegated to the Rwandan Second Division.

- AS Kigali
- A.P.R.
- Bugesera
- Espoir
- Etincelles
- Gasogi United
- Gorilla
- Kiyovu Sports
- Marines
- Muhanga
- Mukura Victory
- Musanze
- Police
- Rayon Sports
- Rutsiro
- Sunrise

== League Changes ==
Rutsiro and Gorilla FC were promoted to the league after making the second division play-off final.

== League table ==
=== Championship Round ===
Pos	Team	Pld	W	D	L	GF	GA	GD	Pts	Qualification or relegation
1	APR (C)	7	6	1	0	21	1	+20	19	Champions, Qualification to the 2021–22 CAF Champions League
2	AS Kigali	7	6	1	0	14	2	+12	19	Qualification to the 2021–22 CAF Confederation Cup
3	Espoir	7	3	1	3	9	11	−2	10	
4	Police	7	2	2	3	7	11	−4	8	
5	Marines	7	2	1	4	5	12	−7	7	
6	Rutsiro	7	1	3	3	5	12	−7	6	
7	Rayon Sports	7	1	2	4	7	12	−5	5	
8	Bugesera	7	1	1	5	5	12	−7	4	

Source: soccerway.com
Rules for classification: 1) points; 2) goal difference; 3) number of goals scored.
(C) Champions

=== Relegation Round ===
Pos	Team	Pld	W	D	L	GF	GA	GD	Pts	Qualification or relegation
1	Kiyovu Sports	7	4	1	2	8	3	+5	13	
2	Gasogi United	7	3	3	1	13	7	+6	12	
3	Etincelles	7	4	0	3	13	8	+5	12	
4	Musanze	7	4	0	3	11	14	−3	12	
5	Mukura	7	3	2	2	8	7	+1	11	
6	Gorilla	7	3	1	3	10	9	+1	10	
7	Sunrise (R)	7	2	3	2	13	8	+5	9	Relegated
8	AS Muhanga (R)	7	0	0	7	3	23	−20	0	Relegated

Source: soccerway.com
Rules for classification: 1) points; 2) goal difference; 3) number of goals scored.
(R) Relegated
