= 2022–23 Rwanda Premier League =

Rwanda Premier League
- Season: 2022–23
- Champions: APR
- Matches: 240
- Goals: 571 (2.38 per match)

The 2022–23 Rwanda Premier League was a season of the Rwanda Premier League, the top-tier football league in Rwanda.

APR FC won their fourth consecutive league title on the last day of the season. Kiyovu Sports led the table by three points with four matches to play in search of their first title since 1993. However a 2–1 victory over Gorilla FC on the final day was enough for APR to clinch the title on goal difference. Kiyovu relegated 15th-placed Rutsiro 3–1 on the final match day while Rayon Sports won the cup to qualify for the Confederation Cup.

== Changes ==
Nyagatari-based Sunrise and Rwamagawa City were promoted from the 2021–22 Rwanda Second Division. They replaced relegated Etoile de l'Est and Gicumbi.

Rwamagawa City also changed their name to Muhazi United following the season.

== League Table ==
Pos	Team	Pld	W	D	L	GF	GA	GD	Pts	Qualification or relegation
1	APR (C)	30	18	9	3	52	26	+26	63	Champions, Qualification to the 2023–24 CAF Champions League
2	Kiyovu Sports	30	19	6	5	46	29	+17	63	
3	Rayon Sports	30	19	4	7	45	27	+18	61	Qualification to the 2023–24 CAF Confederation Cup
4	AS Kigali	30	13	8	9	35	22	+13	47	
5	Police FC	30	14	5	11	38	30	+8	47	
6	Mukura Victory	30	13	6	11	42	32	+10	45	
7	Etincelles	30	12	8	10	41	45	−4	44	
8	Gasogi United	30	11	10	9	37	33	+4	43	
9	Gorilla FC	30	11	6	13	32	33	−1	39	
10	Musanze	30	10	7	13	33	44	−11	37	
11	Sunrise FC	30	9	7	14	35	37	−2	34	
12	Marines FC	30	10	4	16	38	47	−9	34	
13	Bugesera	30	8	8	14	28	33	−5	32	
14	Rwamagawa City	30	9	4	17	27	44	−17	31	
15	Rutsiro (R)	30	7	9	14	28	40	−12	30	Relegation
16	Espoir (R)	30	4	5	21	14	49	−35	17	Relegation

Source: soccerway.com
Rules for classification: 1) points; 2) goal difference; 3) number of goals scored.
(C) Champions; (R) Relegated

== Attendances ==
#	Football club	Average attendance
1	APR FC	2,665
2	Rayon Sports	2,574
3	Sunrise FC	2,392
4	Mukura Victory	1,646
5	Musanze FC	1,488
6	Marines FC	1,362
7	Rwamagana City FC	459
8	Espoir FC	448
9	Etincelles FC	412
10	Police FC	256
11	Kiyovu Sports	251
12	Rutsiro FC	250
13	Gasogi United	242
14	Bugesera FC	205
15	AS Kigali	148
16	Gorilla FC	128
