= 2017–18 Rwanda Premier League =

Rwanda Premier League
- Season: 2017–18
- Champions: APR

The 2017–18 Rwanda Premier League, known as the Azam Rwanda Premier League for sponsorship reasons, was the 41st season of top-tier football in Rwanda. The season started on 30 September 2017 and concluded on 27 June 2018.

== Standings ==
Final table.

Pos	Team	Pld	W	D	L	GF	GA	GD	Pts	Qualification or relegation
1	APR FC	30	19	9	2	51	15	+36	66	Champions
2	AS Kigali	30	18	7	5	54	25	+29	61	
3	Rayon Sports	30	14	10	6	47	22	+25	52	
4	Etincelles FC	30	14	9	7	37	23	+14	51	
5	Kiyovu Sports	30	14	7	9	37	30	+7	49	
6	Police FC	30	13	9	8	38	28	+10	48	
7	Sunrise FC	30	10	8	12	30	37	−7	38	
8	Espoir FC	30	8	13	9	28	32	−4	37	
9	Musanze FC	30	8	11	11	34	34	0	35	
10	Kirehe FC	30	9	7	14	25	38	−13	34	
11	Bugesera FC	30	8	9	13	18	33	−15	33	
12	Marines FC	30	6	14	10	32	40	−8	32	
13	Mukura VS	30	5	16	9	18	21	−3	31	
14	Amagaju FC	30	8	7	15	28	41	−13	31	
15	Gicumbi FC	30	7	6	17	16	40	−24	27	Relegation to lower division
16	Miroplast FC	30	3	10	17	18	52	−34	19	Relegation to lower division

Updated to match(es) played on unknown. Source:
