= 2016–17 Rwanda National Football League =

Rwanda National Football League
- Season: 2016–17
- Champions: Rayon Sports F.C.

The 2016–17 Rwanda National Football League, known as the Azam Rwanda Premier League for sponsorship reasons, is the 40th season of top-tier football in Rwanda. The season started on 14 October 2016 and concluded on 15 June 2017.

== Standings ==
Pos	Team	Pld	W	D	L	GF	GA	GD	Pts	Qualification or relegation
1	Rayon Sports (C)	30	22	7	1	63	20	+43	73	Champions
2	Police FC	30	17	10	3	50	26	+24	61	
3	APR	30	15	12	3	39	20	+19	57	
4	AS Kigali	30	15	8	7	36	23	+13	53	
5	Bugesera	30	13	11	6	35	22	+13	50	
6	Musanze	30	12	9	9	36	34	+2	45	
7	Etincelles	30	10	10	10	25	29	−4	40	
8	Espoir	30	9	12	9	22	20	+2	39	
9	Sunrise	30	8	9	13	26	31	−5	33	
10	Amagaju	30	9	6	15	25	33	−8	33	
11	Kirehe	30	8	8	14	26	32	−6	32	
12	Mukura Victory	30	8	8	14	28	42	−14	32	
13	Marines FC	30	8	6	16	25	40	−15	30	
14	Gicumbi	30	7	7	16	27	48	−21	28	
15	Kiyovu Sports (R)	30	6	9	15	29	45	−16	27	Relegation
16	Pepinières (R)	30	3	8	19	21	48	−27	17	Relegation

Source: RSSSF
(C) Champions; (R) Relegated
