= 2012–13 Rwanda National Football League =

Rwanda National Football League
- Season: 2012–13
- Champions: Rayon Sports (7th title)
- Champions League: Rayon Sports
- Confederation Cup: AS Kigali (cup winner)
- Matches: 182
- Goals: 354 (1.95 per match)
- Biggest home win: Police 6–0 Marines (29 January 2013)
- Biggest away win: Etincelles 0–5 Police (21 April 2013); Etincelles 0–5 Rayon Sports (4 May 2013)
- Highest scoring: Rayon Sports 6–1 Muhanga (12 May 2013)
- All statistics correct as of 25 May 2013.

The 2012–13 Rwanda National Football League (known as the Primus National Football League for sponsorship reasons) was the 36th season of the Rwanda National Football League since it began in 1975. The season began on 22 September 2012 and ended on 25 May 2013. Armée Patriotique Rwandaise were the defending champions, having won their record 13th title the previous season.

Rayon Sports won their 7th title, finishing at the top of the table with 57 points, and represented Rwanda in the 2014 CAF Champions League.

== Clubs ==
=== Changes from last season ===
The number of teams in the league increased from 13 last season to 14 this season after Nyanza's withdrawal and their replacement by Espoir in the league.

Relegated from National Football League

- Nyanza

Promoted from Second Division

- Muhanga
- Musanze
Locations of the 2012–13 Rwanda National Football League teams in Rwanda.

=== Participating teams ===
Team	Location
Amagaju	Nyamagabe
A.P.R.	Kigali
AS Kigali	Kigali
Etincelles	Rubavu
Espoir	Rusizi
Isonga	Kigali
Kiyovu Sports	Kigali
La Jeunesse	Kigali
Marines	Rubavu
Muhanga	Gitarama
Mukura Victory	Huye
Musanze	Ruhengeri
Police	Kigali
Rayon Sports	Nyanza

== League table ==
Pos	Team	Pld	W	D	L	GF	GA	GD	Pts	Qualification or relegation
1	Rayon Sports (C, Q)	26	18	3	5	58	25	+33	57	Qualification for 2014 CAF Champions League
2	Police	26	14	10	2	40	13	+27	52	
3	A.P.R.	26	12	10	4	31	20	+11	46	
4	Mukura Victory	26	12	6	8	25	19	+6	42	
5	La Jeunesse	26	11	7	8	27	24	+3	40	
6	AS Kigali (Q)	26	10	9	7	24	18	+6	39	Qualification for 2014 CAF Confederation Cup (Note: AS Kigali qualified for the 2014 CAF Confederation Cup as winners of the 2013 Rwandan Cup.)
7	Musanze	26	9	9	8	24	21	+3	36	
8	Kiyovu Sports	26	9	7	10	21	26	−5	34	
9	Amagaju	26	7	10	9	18	21	−3	31	
10	Espoir	26	8	6	12	20	28	−8	30	
11	Muhanga	26	6	9	11	14	29	−15	27	
12	Marines	26	6	6	14	16	38	−22	24	
13	Etincelles	26	3	8	15	15	37	−22	17	Relegation to 2013–14 Rwandan Second Division
14	Isonga (R)	26	2	10	14	21	35	−14	16	Relegation to 2013–14 Rwandan Second Division

Updated to match(es) played on 25 May 2013. Source: Primus National Football League
Rules for classification: 1) points; 2) goal difference; 3) number of goals scored.
(C) Champions; (Q) Qualified for the phase indicated; (R) Relegated

== Results ==
Home \ Away	AGJ	APR	ASK	EFC	ETC	ISG	KVS	LJN	MRN	MHG	MKV	MSZ	POL	RYS
Amagaju		0–0	0–0	2–0	2–0	0–0	0–1	0–1	3–0	0–0	0–1	1–0	0–3	1–1
A.P.R.	1–1		0–1	1–0	1–1	3–1	1–0	2–0	2–1	1–0	3–1	1–0	1–1	0–4
AS Kigali	0–0	0–3		2–0	1–1	1–1	0–0	0–1	2–0	2–0	0–1	0–1	0–1	3–1
Espoir	1–0	1–1	0–0		1–0	1–0	1–0	1–0	1–1	0–1	2–3	2–1		0–3
Etincelles	1–1	0–0	0–1	1–2		1–0	0–1	0–1	0–0	0–0	1–0	1–2	0–5	0–5
Isonga	3–1	1–2	2–3	2–2	1–2		1–3	1–2	0–0	2–2	2–1	1–1	1–1	0–2
Kiyovu Sports	0–0	1–2	1–0	1–0	1–1	0–0		1–1	1–0	2–1	1–0	0–2	0–2	1–2
La Jeunesse	3–2	1–0	2–2	1–0	2–0	1–0	1–2		1–2	0–1	1–1	2–2	2–2	1–2
Marines	0–1	1–1	0–2	2–1	2–1	1–0	2–1	0–0		0–0	1–4	2–0	0–1	0–1
Muhanga	1–0	0–2	0–0	1–0	0–0	1–0	1–1	0–1	2–1		0–1	0–2	0–2	1–3
Mukura Victory	0–0	1–0	1–2	0–0	1–0	1–1	2–0	1–0	1–0	2–0		0–1	0–0	2–1
Musanze	0–1	0–0	0–0	2–1	1–0	0–0	1–1	2–1	2–0	1–1	0–0		0–1	0–1
Police	3–0	1–1	0–1	0–0	3–2	2–1	2–0	0–0	6–0	0–0	1–0	1–1		
Rayon Sports	1–2	2–2	2–1	2–3	3–2	1–0	3–1	0–1	4–0	6–1	2–1	3–2	2–0	

Updated to match(es) played on 25 May 2013. Source: Primus National Football League
Legend: Blue = home team win; Yellow = draw; Red = away team win.
