= 2024–25 Rwanda Premier League =

Rwanda Premier League
- Season: 2024–25
- Dates: 15 August 2024 – 28 May 2025
- Champions: APR FC
- Relegated: Muhazi United, Vision FC
- Highest attendance: 45,000; Rayon Sports 0–0 APR FC (7 December 2024)

The 2024–25 Rwanda Premier League is the 48th season of the Rwanda Premier League, the top-tier football league in Rwanda. The season started on 15 August 2024 and concluded on 28 May 2025. APR FC were crowned the champions, winning their sixth title in a row, with Rayon Sports in second place. Muhazi United and Vision FC were the two clubs relegated from the Premier League.

== Season summary ==
The early part of the season, up to the end of 2024, was dominated by Rayon Sports, who were chasing their first title since the 2018–19 campaign. After ten games, the club led the table by six points ahead of AS Kigali, with Senegalese striker Ngagne Fall leading the goal-scoring with six. APR FC, winners of the previous five titles, were in fifth place at the beginning of December, but had played several games fewer than their rivals.

The league took a mid-season break in January, Rayon Sports having a five-point lead at the time after both they and second-placed APR lost their final games before the intermission, both at the Huye Stadium to Mukura Victory Sports and Amagaju respectively. The top two were considerably ahead of the rest of the teams in the division, third-placed AS Kigali being six points behind APR at the time of the break.

The season resumed in February, with APR reducing Rayon's lead to two points by the time the two sides met for their second match of the season on 9 March at Amahoro Stadium. This match finished 0–0 with neither side having many clear-cut chances.

In April, Rayon Sports sacked their coach Robertinho after a 2–2 draw with Marine FC. The club had recorded only three matches out of ten prior to that point, and lost the top spot in the table to APR. This was the first time Rayon had not led the table since the start of the 2025 calendar year. Claude Rwaka, the title-winning Ryon women's coach, took over to replace Robertinho.

On 17 May, a match between Bugesera and Rayon Sports had to be postponed after 57 minutes when Rayon supporters began protesting and throwing projectiles on to the field. Bugesera were leading 2–0 at the time, with Umar Abba having just scored their second goal through a controversial penalty, shortly after Rayon had been denied a penalty of their own to potentially level the match. APR won their game on the same day, a 1–0 win over Gorilla FC – the lone goal also coming through a disputed penalty – and moved two points clear at the top of the table. The Bugesera–Rayon match was resumed four days later, from the point where it had been abandoned, and despite scoring in the 84th minute, they still lost the game 2–1.

Vision FC became the first club to be relegated on 13 May after one season in the top flight, following a 2–1 defeat to Marines FC. APR FC then sealed the Premier League title on 24 May when they beat Muhazi United 1–0, while Rayon Sports were held to a goalless draw by Vision FC. This win gave APR a four-point lead over Rayon with only one game left to play. The battle to avoid the second relegation place went to the final day, as Amagaju faced Muhazi United, holding a three point advantage over their rivals. Amagaju won the match 2–1, consigning Muhazi to a drop to the second tier.

== Aftermath ==
APR's title was their 23rd overall in the Rwandan Premier League – extending their record – and also their 6th consecutive title in a run beginning in 2020. They also completed a League and Cup double, having also won the 2024–25 Rwandan Cup.

An awards ceremony was held at the Kigali Convention Centre on 30 May 2025, to honour the most significant contributors to the 2024–25 season. Clement Niyigena of APR won the award for best player, with APR's Djibirl Ouattara and Bugesera's Umar Abba also in contention for the award. Niyigena had also won the player of the tournament for the 2024 Kagame Interclub Cup at the beginning of the season.

== League table ==
Pos	Team	Pld	W	D	L	GF	GA	GD	Pts	Qualification or relegation
1	APR (C)	30	20	7	3	46	17	+29	67	Qualification for Champions League
2	Rayon Sports	30	18	9	3	42	17	+25	63	Qualification for Confederation Cup
3	Kigali	30	14	7	9	32	27	+5	49	
4	Police	30	11	12	7	38	24	+14	45	
5	Mukura Victory Sports	30	10	11	9	23	27	−4	41	
6	Bugesera	30	10	10	10	37	29	+8	40	
7	Gorilla	30	11	7	12	27	25	+2	40	
8	Gasogi United	30	10	10	10	29	29	0	40	
9	Rutsiro	30	9	11	10	30	35	−5	38	
10	Kiyovu Sports	30	11	4	15	32	51	−19	37	
11	Amagaju	30	10	6	14	29	38	−9	36	
12	Etincelles	30	7	13	10	25	27	−2	34	
13	Musanze	30	7	13	10	26	31	−5	34	
14	Marines	30	9	7	14	37	46	−9	34	
15	Muhazi United (R)	30	7	9	14	22	29	−7	30	Relegation
16	Vision FC (R)	30	5	6	19	23	46	−23	21	Relegation

Rules for classification: 1) Points; 2) Goal difference; 5) Goals scored
(C) Champions; (R) Relegated
