= Mohamed Mushimiyimana =

Rwandan footballer

Personal information
- Full name: Mohamed Mushimiyimana
- Date of birth: 28 January 1996 (age 30)
- Place of birth: Kigali, Rwanda
- Height: 1.80 m (5 ft 11 in)
- Position: Midfielder

Team information
- Current team: APR
- Number: 13

Youth career
- –2012: SEC Academy

Senior career*
Years	Team	Apps	(Gls)
2012–2015	AS Kigali		
2015	Győri ETO	0	(0)
2015–2019	Police		
2019–	APR		

International career
- Rwanda U-17
- Rwanda U-20
2013–	Rwanda	8	(0)
- * Club domestic league appearances and goals

Mohamed "Meddy" Mushimiyimana (born 28 January 1996) is a Rwandan footballer who currently plays for APR in the Rwanda Premier League and the Rwanda national team as a midfielder.

== Career ==
Mushimiyimana started his career in a local club called AS Kigali, and after denying other local clubs, in 2015 he signed for Győri ETO .

== International career ==
Mushimiyimana made his senior international debut for Rwanda as a substitute in a second leg 2014 African Nations Championship qualification match defeat by penalties against Ethiopia on 27 July 2013.

== Honours ==
AS Kigali

- Rwandan Cup: Winner (2013)
- Rwanda National Football League: Third place (2013–14)
- CAF Confederation Cup: Second Round (2014)

Rwanda

- 2013 CECAFA Cup: Quarter-finals
