= Jean-Claude Ndoli =

Rwandan footballer

Personal information
- Full name: Jean-Claude Ndoli
- Date of birth: 7 September 1986 (age 40)
- Place of birth: Kibungo, Rwanda
- Position: Goalkeeper

Youth career
- 2001–2004: Police FC

Senior career*
Years	Team	Apps	(Gls)
2005	Police FC	19	(0)
2006–2016	APR FC	85	(0)

International career
2006–2016	Rwanda	19	(0)
- * Club domestic league appearances and goals

Jean Claude Ndoli (born 7 September 1986 in Kibungo) is a Rwandan-born footballer.

== Career ==
He signed for APR FC in 2006, from Rwanda Police FC. He made his debut for APR FC in the first game of the 2006 Rwandan Premier League season against SC Kiyovu Sport.

Playing with APR FC from 2005 to 2016, Ndoli has won 10 Rwandan Premier League titles and 7 Rwandan Cups. He split duties and play and goalkeeping coach at the end of his time with APR FC.

== International career ==
Ndoli is a regular starter as the #1 Goalkeeper for the Rwanda national football team and has played 16 times for the "Wasps". He started in goal as Rwanda lost the 2009 CECAFA Cup final 2–0 to Uganda. Ndoli last received a call-up in 2016.
