= Gilbert Kanyankore =

Rwandan football manager (1954–2026)

Personal information
- Full name: Jean Gilbert Kanyankore
- Date of birth: 1954
- Place of birth: Butare, Ruanda-Urundi
- Date of death: c. 25 July 2026 (aged 72)

Senior career*
Years	Team	Apps	(Gls)
- Vital'O

Managerial career
- 1999: Rwanda B
- AS Kigali
- 2006: Rayon Sports
- 2006–2013: Vital'O
- 2013–2014: Kiyovu Sports
- Vital'O
- 2016: APR
- 2016: Rwanda
- * Club domestic league appearances and goals

Jean Gilbert Kanyankore (1954 – c. 25 July 2026) was a Rwandan football manager.

== Background ==
Kanyankore was born in Butare, Ruanda-Urundi in 1954. As a child, he fled to Burundi with his family. Growing up in Burundi, he attended St Albert Secondary School. After that, he attended the Université Pédagogique Nationale, where he studied physical education. Altogether, he could speak six languages including - French, Lingala, Kirundi, Kiswahili, and Kinyarwanda.

On 25 July 2026, it was announced that Kanyankore had died. He was 72.

== Career ==
During the 1970s and 1980s, Kanyankore played for Burundian side Vital'O. In 1999, he was appointed manager of the Rwanda B national team, helping the team win the 1999 CECAFA Cup. Following this stint, he was appointed manager of Rwandan side AS Kigali, helping the club win the 2001 Rwandan Cup. In 2006, he was appointed manager of Rwandan side Rayon Sports, helping the club reach the quarter-finals of the 2006 Kagame Interclub Cup, before returning to Burundian side Vital'O shortly thereafter.

In 2013, he was appointed manager of Rwandan side Kiyovu Sports. However, citing unfavorable working conditions, he soon returned to Burundian side Vital'O for the second time. While managing the club, he was described by Burundian journalist Patrick Sota as "the most successful coach in Burundi". In 2016, he was appointed manager of Rwandan side APR. The same year, he was appointed manager of the Rwanda national team.
