= André Cassa Mbungo =

Rwandan football manager (born 1968)

Personal information
- Date of birth: 18 January 1968 (age 58)
- Place of birth: Kampala, Uganda
- Height: 1.94 m (6 ft 4 in)
- Position: Goalkeeper

Team information
- Current team: Jamus FC (manager)

Managerial career
- Years: Team
- 1998–2002: APR Youth team
- 2002–2004: Rwandatel
- 2004–2006: AS Kigali FC
- 2006: Kiyovu SC
- 2007–2009: Police FC
- 2009–2012: SEC Academy
- 2012–2014: AS Kigali FC
- 2014: Rwanda (caretaker)
- 2014–2016: Police FC
- 2017: Sunrise FC
- 2017–18: Kiyovu SC
- 2019: AFC Leopards
- 2020: Rayon Sports F.C.
- 2020: Gasogi United F.C.
- 2021–2022: Bandari FC
- 2022-23: AS Kigali FC
- 2024-: Jamus FC

André Cassa Mbungo is a former Rwandan goalkeeper currently serving as the head coach of South Sudanese side Jamus FC. He holds a CAF 'A' License and is a FIFA international recognized physical trainer.

== Career ==
Mbungo played club football in Burundi as a goalkeeper for ten years before calling it a day at age 26. He turned out for three clubs; Dynamo (1984-1990), Atletico (1990-1992), and Flamengo (1992-1994) before returning to Rwanda to take up coaching.

His coaching journey began at APR's junior team between 1998 and 2002. He then moved to Rwandatel until the year 2004 before joining Kiyovu SC. A move to Police F.C. (Rwanda), SEC Academy, and Sunrise kept him in Rwanda till the year 2018.

In early 2019, Mbungo took up his first coaching role outside the Rwanda borders by joining Kenyan Premier League side AFC Leopards on an initial one-and-a-half-year deal as a replacement to Marko Vasiljević. After a short four months he extended his contract by another year to mid-2021. However, he left the club after four months of that extension, in mid-December 2019.

He returned to Rwanda and joined Rayon Sports as head coach on a six-month's deal before moving to Gasogi United F.C., swapping places with DR Congo-born Guy Bukasa.

In January 2021 he was back in Kenya to join Kenyan Premier League side Bandari F.C. to replace Kennedy Odhiambo. While at the club he was named the coach of the month in February, and August 2021. Slightly over a year later he left the club.

He returned to Rwanda for a third time after 2004 and 2014, in April 2022, to take up a role at AS Kigali. He replaced Ugandan Mike Mutebi and within two months the club won the Rwanda Peace Cup, and Rwandan Super Cup with wins over APR.

He left AS Kigali in November 2023, and had been in between jobs till his appointment at Juba-based Jamus FC.

== Rwanda National team ==
In May 2014, the Rwanda Football Federation (Ferwafa) appointed Mbungo as the assistant coach of the Rwanda National team Amavubi ahead of 2015 Africa Cup of Nations qualification.

== Honours ==
=== Club ===
Flamengo (Burundi)

- 2nd Division Champions: 1993/94

AS Kigali (Rwanda)

- Rwanda Peace Cup Champions: 2013, 2022
- Rwanda Super Cup Champions: 2022

Police F.C. (Rwanda)

- Rwanda Peace Cup Champions: 2014
- 2014 Kagame Interclub Cup Second runner-up: 2014

=== Individual ===
Bandari (Kenya)

- Kenyan Premier League Coach of the Week (3): 2020–21 Match day 12, 13, 14 (February 2021)
- Kenyan Premier League Coach of the Month (2): March 2021, August 2021
