= Emery Bayisenge =

Rwandan footballer (born 1994)

Personal information
- Date of birth: 2 November 1994 (age 31)
- Place of birth: Huye, Rwanda
- Height: 1.83 m (6 ft 0 in)
- Position: Central defender

Team information
- Current team: Gor Mahia

Senior career*
Years	Team	Apps	(Gls)
2010–2011	Amagaju		
2011–2012	Isonga		
2012–2016	APR		
2016–2017	KAC Kénitra	26	(1)
2017–2018	JS Massira		
2018–2019	USM Alger	0	(0)
2019–2020	Saif	13	(3)
2020–2021	AS Kigali		
2021–2022	Saif		
2023–	Gor Mahia		

International career^{‡}
- Rwanda U20
2011–	Rwanda	43	(1)
- * Club domestic league appearances and goals as of 18:38, 24 August 2023 (UTC) ‡ National team caps and goals as of 10:55, 20 September 2021 (UTC)

Emery Bayisenge (born 2 November 1994) is a Rwandan international footballer who plays as a central defender for Kenyan club Gor Mahia.

== Club career ==
Born in Huye, Bayisenge has played club football for Amagaju, Isonga, APR, KAC Kénitra, JS Massira, and USM Alger. In July 2015 he was close to a move to Austrian club LASK Linz.

In January 2019 he signed for Bangladeshi club Saif. He returned to Rwanda with AS Kigali in September 2020.

He rejoined Saif in November 2021.

In February 2023 he agreed to sign for Kenyan club Gor Mahia, completing the move in March 2023. He played as a second choice right back for the club in his first season, but said he wanted to renew his contract. He won the league championship with the club that season.

== International career ==
He captained under-20 team of Rwanda.

He made his senior international debut for Rwanda in 2011, and has appeared in FIFA World Cup qualifying matches.

=== International goals ===
Scores and results list Rwanda's goal tally first.

Goal	Date	Venue	Opponent	Score	Result	Competition
1.	16 January 2016	Amahoro Stadium, Kigali, Rwanda	Ivory Coast	1–0	1–0	2016 African Nations Championship
