= Jean-Luc Ndayishimiye =

Rwandan footballer

Personal information
- Full name: Jean-Luc Ndayishimiye
- Date of birth: 12 January 1991 (age 35)
- Place of birth: Kigali, Rwanda
- Position: Goalkeeper

Senior career*
Years	Team	Apps	(Gls)
2008–2009	ATRACO FC		
2009–2013	APR FC		
2013–	Rayon Sports		

International career
2007–2021	Rwanda	74	(0)
- * Club domestic league appearances and goals

Jean-Luc Eric Bakame Ndayishimiye (born 25 May 1991) is a Rwanda international footballer who plays as a goalkeeper. As of February 2010, he plays for APR FC and has won six caps for his country. Jean Luc signed for Rayons Sport since 2013 and he signed recently an extension of contract that will make him stay in Rayon for another 2 years.

== Achievements ==
- Champion of Rwanda in 2010, 2011, and 2012 with APR FC
- Winner of the Rwandan Cup in 2009 with ATRACO FC, in 2010, 2011, and 2012 with APR FC
- Winner of the Kagame Interclub Cup in 2009 with ATRACO FC, in 2010 with APR FC
