= Ljupko Petrović =

Serbian footballer

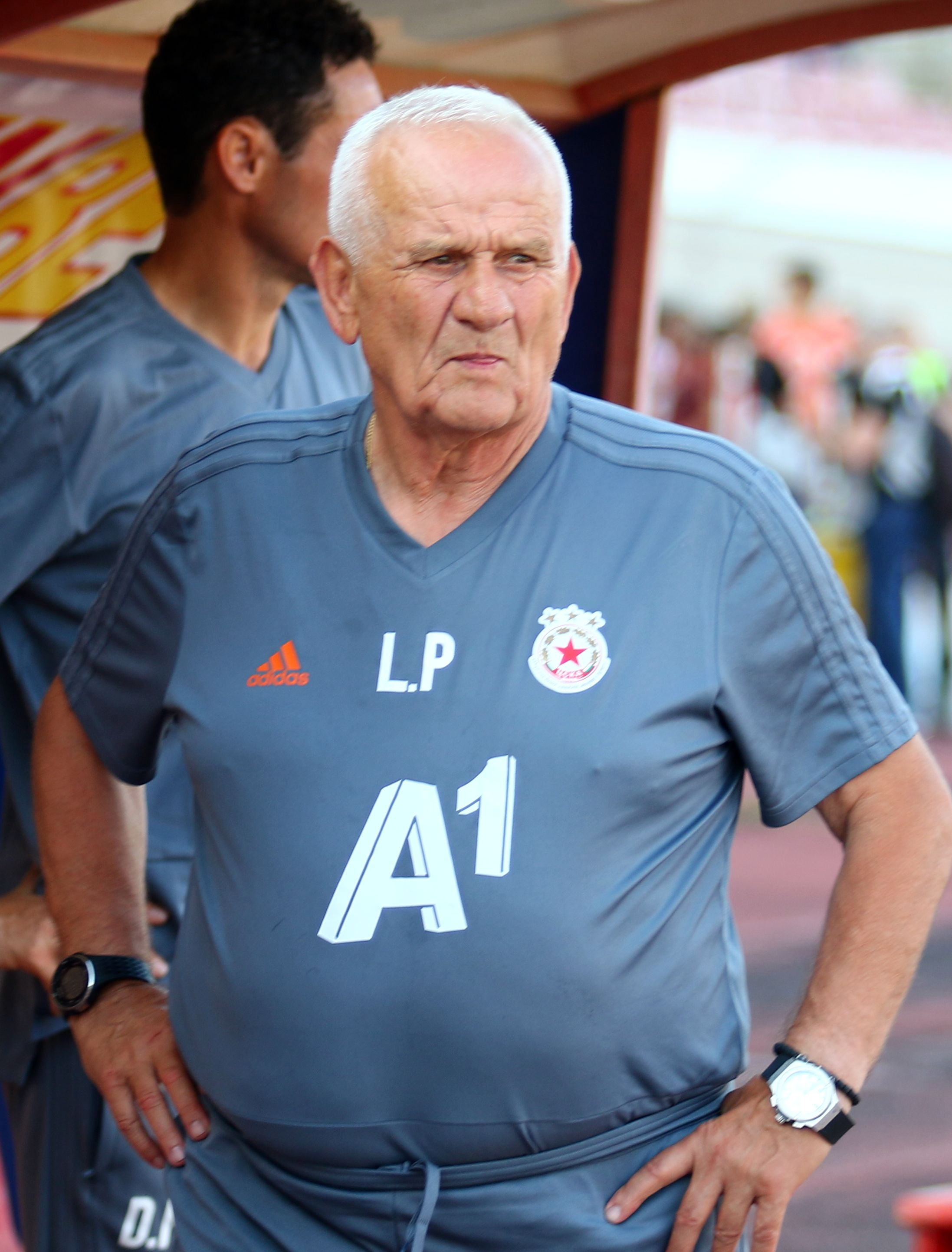
- Petrović as CSKA Sofia manager in 2019

Personal information
- Full name: Ljubomir Petrović
- Date of birth: 15 May 1947 (age 79)
- Place of birth: Bosanski Brod, PR Bosnia and Herzegovina, FPR Yugoslavia
- Position: Forward

Senior career*
Years	Team	Apps	(Gls)
1967–1979	Osijek	318	(134)
1979–1981	Buffalo Stallions (indoor)	70	(79)
1981–1982	Kansas City Comets (indoor)	25	(15)
1982	Phoenix Inferno (indoor)	15	(8)
Total		428	(236)

Managerial career
- 1982–1984: Osijek (youth)
- 1984: Espanyol (assistant)
- 1985–1987: Osijek
- 1987–1988: Spartak Subotica
- 1987: Yugoslavia U18 (assistant)
- 1988: Yugoslavia U21
- 1988–1989: Vojvodina
- 1990: Rad
- 1990–1991: Red Star Belgrade
- 1991: Espanyol
- 1992: Peñarol
- 1992–1993: PAOK
- 1993: Olympiacos
- 1994–1996: Red Star Belgrade
- 1996: Grazer AK
- 1996–1997: Vojvodina
- 1998–1999: Al-Ahli Dubai
- 1999–2000: Shanghai Shenhua
- 2000–2001: Levski Sofia
- 2002–2003: Beijing Guoan
- 2003–2004: Litex Lovech
- 2004: Red Star Belgrade
- 2005–2007: Litex Lovech
- 2008: OFK Beograd
- 2008: Croatia Sesvete
- 2008–2009: Vojvodina
- 2010–2011: Lokomotiva Zagreb
- 2011–2013: Taraz
- 2013: Akzhayik
- 2015: APR FC
- 2015: Litex Lovech
- 2016: Levski Sofia
- 2017: Thanh Hóa
- 2018: APR FC
- 2018–2019: CSKA Sofia (consultant)
- 2019: CSKA Sofia
- 2020–2022: Thanh Hóa
- 2023: Litex Lovech (consultant)
- 2023: Litex Lovech
- * Club domestic league appearances and goals

Ljubomir "Ljupko" Petrović (Serbian Cyrillic: Љубомир "Љупко" Петровић; born 15 May 1947) is a Serbian professional football manager and former player. He also holds a Bosnian passport.

As a manager, Petrović's biggest success was winning the European Cup in the 1990–91 season with Red Star Belgrade.

== Playing career ==
Born in Brusnica Velika (a village near Bosanski Brod) in Bosnia and Herzegovina, Yugoslavia, Petrović, Started playing for NK Darda and then moved to NK Osijek during most of his career. After his career at Osijek he also spent some time in the United States.

== Managerial career ==
As a manager, he has been in charge of NK Osijek, FK Spartak Subotica, FK Rad, FK Vojvodina, and finally Red Star Belgrade, with whom he won the 1991 European Cup.

He has also managed Spanish side RCD Espanyol, Uruguayan C.A. Peñarol, Austrian Grazer AK (where he was dismissed after slapping Boban Dmitrović) and Chinese Shanghai Shenhua and Beijing Guoan.

He had another two spells at Red Star before moving to Bulgaria in the 2000s to coach PFC Levski Sofia and later PFC Litex Lovech. He came back to Serbia in March 2008 to become the manager of OFK Beograd, but he resigned from this position one month later.

On 2 July 2008, Petrović became the head coach of Croatian First League team Croatia Sesvete, thus becoming the first Serbian head coach of a Croatian first division team after the Yugoslav wars.

On 23 December 2008, he was appointed for the head coach of his former team FK Vojvodina from Novi Sad, title challengers in the Serbian Superliga for the 2008–09 season. Yet, after gaining only one point in the first two matches of the second part of the season, he resigned from this position on 8 March 2009. In 2010 he coached Croatian side NK Lokomotiva Zagreb a feeding club of Croatian football giant GNK Dinamo Zagreb.

In the summer of 2015 Petrović managed Litex Lovech for three matches, leading them to first place in the 2015–16 A PFG standings, but left the team in early August for family reasons. In early December he returned to the team from Lovech once again after the position of manager was vacated by Laurențiu Reghecampf. Petrović guided them to the 1/2 finals of the Bulgarian Cup. However, it eventually turned out to be another short-lived appointment for the Serbian head coach, as Litex were expelled from the A PFG by the Bulgarian Football Union after their players were ordered off the pitch in a heated derby match against Levski Sofia held on 12 December.

In May 2016, he was unveiled as the new manager of Levski Sofia, replacing Stoycho Stoev. He left Levski on 22 October 2016.

After Levski he also managed Vietnemese club Thanh Hoa FC and Rwandan club APR FC.

In December 2018, Petrović became a consultant at PFC CSKA Sofia.

Since 21 July 2019 he is officially the head coach of PFC CSKA Sofia, replacing Dobromir Mitov who was demoted to assistant.

In 2020, he returned to Vietnam to manage FLC Thanh Hóa, currently Đông Á Thanh Hóa once again for the 2021 V.League 1 season.

== FK Sarajevo controversy ==
On 8 April 2014, Petrović was announced as the successor of the recently sacked Croatian manager Robert Jarni as the head of the FK Sarajevo team.

However, only two days after, a picture of the manager and deceased Serbian paramilitary commander Arkan erupted in the Bosnian media depicting Petrović holding a weapon while instructed by the war criminal. This resulted in a hurried press conference where the FK Sarajevo board of members announced that no contract would be signed with Petrović.

The manager himself agreed to the decision, citing the possibility of strained working conditions after the unexpected publication. He however claimed no involvement in the Yugoslav wars nor the paramilitary activities of Arkan. Petrović managed FK Sarajevo for only one day, conducting a single training with the players. The authenticity of the photo has later been brought to doubt.

== Personal life ==
Petrović is married to Snežana with whom he has two children: son Srđan and daughter Svetlana. He also has three grandchildren: Nikola, Anastasija and Viktor.

== Politician ==
Petrović appeared in the ninth position on the electoral list of the Socialist Party of Serbia (SPS) in the 2020 Serbian parliamentary election and was elected to the Serbian parliament when the list won thirty-two seats. During his time in the legislature, he was a member of Serbia's parliamentary friendship groups with Bulgaria, Cyprus, Greece, Japan, Kazakhstan, and Rwanda. He resigned from the legislature on 13 May 2021.

== Managerial statistics ==
As of 16 December 2023

Team	From	To	Record				
Team	From	To	G	W	D	L	Win %
NK Osijek	1985	1987	76	32	13	31	42.11
FK Spartak Subotica	1987	1988	37	21	9	7	56.76
FK Vojvodina	1988	1989	45	23	8	14	51.11
FK Rad	1990	1990	17	8	3	6	47.06
Red Star Belgrade	1990	1991	53	35	11	7	66.04
RCD Espanyol	1991	1991	18	6	4	8	33.33
Club Atlético Peñarol	1992	1992	18	5	7	6	27.78
PAOK	1992	1993	39	19	9	11	48.72
Olympiacos F.C.	1993	1994	24	15	7	2	62.50
Red Star Belgrade	1994	1996	81	54	16	11	66.67
Grazer AK	1996	1996	22	9	6	7	40.91
FK Vojvodina	1996	1997	20	9	6	5	45.00
Shabab Al-Ahli	1998	1999	33	15	7	11	45.45
Shanghai Shenhua F.C.	1999	2000	26	14	8	4	53.85
Levski Sofia	2000	2001	54	37	11	6	68.52
Beijing Guoan F.C.	2002	2003	52	24	12	16	46.15
PFC Litex Lovech	2003	2004	42	26	13	3	61.90
Red Star Belgrade	2004	2004	8	3	2	3	37.50
PFC Litex Lovech	2005	2007	72	46	12	14	63.89
OFK Beograd	2008	2008	6	0	2	4	0.00
Croatia Sesvete	2008	2008	18	5	4	9	27.78
FK Vojvodina	2008	2009	2	0	1	1	0.00
NK Lokomotiva Zagreb	2010	2011	11	3	3	5	27.27
FC Taraz	2011	2012	29	15	5	9	51.72
FC Akzhayik	2013	2013	35	8	11	16	22.86
APR F.C.	2014	2014	30	20	6	4	66.67
PFC Litex Lovech	2015	2015	4	3	1	0	75.00
Levski Sofia	2016	2016	13	8	5	0	61.54
Dong A Thanh Hoa	2017	2017	27	13	9	5	48.15
APR F.C.	2018	2018	18	12	4	2	66.67
CSKA Sofia	2019	2019	14	6	5	3	42.86
Dong A Thanh Hoa	2020	2022	38	17	6	15	44.74
PFC Litex Lovech	2023	2023	12	5	5	2	41.67
Total			975	504	227	244	51.69

== Honours ==
=== Player ===
Osijek

- Yugoslav Second League: 1969–70 (West), 1972–73 (West), 1976–77 (West)

=== Manager ===
Spartak Subotica

- Yugoslav Second League: 1987–88 (West)

Vojvodina

- Yugoslav First League: 1988–89

Red Star Belgrade

- Yugoslav First League: 1990–91
- First League of FR Yugoslavia: 1994–95
- FR Yugoslavia Cup: 1994–95
- European Cup: 1990–91

Levski Sofia

- Bulgarian Championship: 2000–01

Beijing Guoan

- Chinese FA Cup: 2003

Litex Lovech

- Bulgarian Cup: 2003–04

APR FC

- Rwanda National Football League: 2013–14, 2017–18
