= Isaïe Songa =

Rwandan footballer

Personal information
- Date of birth: August 5, 1994 (age 32)
- Place of birth: Kigali, Rwanda
- Height: 1.78 m (5 ft 10 in)
- Position: Forward

Team information
- Current team: Étincelles

Senior career*
| Years | Team | Apps | (Gls) |
| 2011–2012 | SEC Academy | | |
| 2012–2013 | Isonga | | |
| 2013–2015 | APR | | |
| 2015–2020 | Police | | |
| 2020– | Étincelles | | |

International career
| 2015–2016 | Rwanda | 8 | (0) |
- * Club domestic league appearances and goals

Isaïe Songa (born 5 August 1994) is a Rwandan football striker who currently plays for Étincelles.
