= Andre Lomami =

Rwandan footballer

André Lomami
Personal information
- Date of birth: 6 August 1987 (age 39)
- Place of birth: Kigali, Rwanda
- Position: Forward

Senior career*
Years	Team	Apps	(Gls)
2004	Police Kibungo		
2005–2007	APR FC		
2007–2010	ATRACO FC		
2010	FK Škendija	5	(1)
2011–	Police Kibungo		

International career^{‡}
2006	Rwanda	1	(0)
- * Club domestic league appearances and goals as of 8 October 2011 ‡ National team caps and goals as of 8 October 2011

André Lomami (born 6 August 1987) is a Rwandan international football forward who plays with Police FC Kibungo.

== Career ==
He had previously represented Rwandan clubs Police FC Kibungo, APR FC and ATRACO FC, and during the first half of the 2010–11 season he played with FK Škendija in the Macedonian First League.

Between 2005 and 2008 he won 4 consecutive Rwandan championships and was the league top scorer in 2006.

== National team ==
He played one match in 2006 for the Rwanda national football team.

== Honours ==
Club:

APR Kigali

- Rwandan Premier League: 2005, 2006, 2007
- Rwandan Cup: 2006, 2007
- CECAFA Clubs Cup: 2007

ATRACO

- Rwandan Premier League: 2008
- Rwandan Cup: 2009
- CECAFA Club Cup: 2009

Shkëndija 79

- Macedonian First League: 2010-11

Personal:

- Rwandan Premier League top scorer: 2006 (13 goals)

== External sources ==
- Andre Lomami at Soccerway (archived)
