= Didier Gomes Da Rosa =

French football manager (born 1969)

Personal information
- Date of birth: 1 October 1969 (age 57)
- Place of birth: Charenton-le-Pont, France
- Height: 1.81 m (5 ft 11 in)

Team information
- Current team: Sierra Leone

Managerial career
- Years: Team
- 2008–2010: AS Roquebrune Cap Martin
- 2010–2010: ES Fos sur Mer
- 2010–2011: Cagnes-le-Cros
- 2012–2013: AS Cannes B
- 2013–2014: Rayon Sports
- 2014–2015: Coton Sport
- 2015–2016: CS Constantine
- 2016–2017: JSM Skikda
- 2017–2018: Ethiopian Coffee
- 2019: Horoya AC
- 2019–2020: Ismaily
- 2020–2021: Al-Merrikh SC
- 2021: Simba SC
- 2021–2022: Mauritania
- 2022: Al-Wehdat
- 2022–2023: Al-Ain FC
- 2023: Al-Taraji
- 2023–2024: Botswana
- 2024–2025: Al Ahli SC (Tripoli)
- 2025: Al-Khor
- 2025–2026: Al-Adalah
- 2026–: Sierra Leone

Didier Gomes Da Rosa (born 10 October 1969) is a French football manager and former player.

He was the manager of the Botswana national football team. He is famous for making an impressive impact in all the clubs he has managed in his early years in the African continent winning the league titles with Rayon Sports F.C. (2013), Coton Sport FC de Garoua (2014 and 2015) and also the Cameroonian Cup at the Garoua-based club.

== Managerial career ==
=== France ===
Didier Gomes Da Rosa began his managerial career in 2008 in his home country France and managed AS Roquebrune Cap Martin, ES Fos sur Mer and AS Cannes in the League of the Mediterranean until 2011.

=== Rayon Sports ===
He first moved out of France in 2012 to Africa and more accurately to Rwanda where he was appointed as the manager of Rwandan giants, Rayon Sports F.C. on a three-year contract. The club, nicknamed "Gikundiro" (the well-beloved), because of its popularity was in the relegation zone of the Rwanda National Football League after a disastrous start in the championship falling ten points short of league leaders and the club's arch rivals, Armée Patriotique Rwandaise F.C. Under the Frenchman's leadership, the Nyanza-based side made a spectacular comeback in the season which will be remembered by Rwandan football fans for the years to come. Seven months later, the Gikundiro thrashed rivals APR 4–0 in a historic win and were crowned the champions of the 2012–13 Rwanda National Football League. He also helped his side win the Genocide Memorial Tournament in 2013 where his side faced La Jeunesse Football Club in the finals. His side also participated 2013 Kagame Interclub Cup but unfortunately lost 1–0 to Burundi's Vital'O FC in the semi-finals. The club after facing serious financial deficits parted ways with the French manager on a mutual consent.

=== Coton Sport ===
He then moved to Cameroon in December 2013 where he signed a two-year contract with Cameroonian giants, Coton Sport FC de Garoua. Appointed as the General Manager as well as the head coach, his task was to prepare the team for the Elite One, Cameroonian Cup and also the CAF Confederation Cup. Soon the Frenchman led his side to championship glory as his side led the league table with more than a ten points. He also helped his young side win the 2014 Cameroonian Cup. He led his team to the semi-finals of the 2014 CAF Confederation Cup where they bowed out to African giants and the eventual champions of the tournament, Al Ahly SC of Egypt. In the following season, despite a six-point penalty, he managed to lead his young side to win the 2015 Elite One.

=== CS Constantine ===
Declining the proposal of renewing his contract with the Cameroonian champions, the Frenchman decided to move to Algeria where he committed himself to a contract for two-years with Constantine-based, CS Constantine when the side was in the relegation zone just twelve days into the championship. He rescued the Algerian side from relegation in the 2015–16 Algerian Ligue Professionnelle 1 and his side was also adjudged the third best side in the second round of the championship.

=== Horoya ===
Didier Gomes became Horoya AC manager in March 2019 and lead the Guinea giant to win the Guinean league and won the Guinean cup. Meantime, Gomes reached the CAF Confederation group stage after knocking out Bandari FC from Kenya . On 10 November 2019, following some misunderstanding between Gomes and Horoya president they mutually parted ways.

=== Ismaily SC ===
He became Ismaily SC manager on 8 January 2020, Didier Gomes lead Ismaily to reach the semi-final of the Arab Champions league and won the first leg match against al raja club 1-0 and then the Arab federation stop the cup cause of COVID-19 pandemic. On 25 August 2020 Didier Gomes was sacked by Ismaily. Ismaily stated the reasons of dismissal due to poor results after draw two matches after the resuming of the Egyptian league.

=== Al-Merrikh SC ===
On 14 November 2020, Didier Gomes was appointed as new head coach for the Sudanese giant Al-Al-Merrikh SC. On 24 November he took charge of the first match in the preliminary round of CAF champions league 2020–21 against the Congolese side Otoho. He achieved a draw 1–1 in Congo, and win against Otoho 2–0 in the second leg match to qualify to round 32. In round 32 he knocked out the giant enyimba Nigerian side after won 3–0 in first leg match and lose 2–1 in second leg match to lead the Al-Al-Merrikh to qualify to the CAF champions league for the first time in 4 seasons. Meantime, Gomes lead Al-Merrikh to lead the Sudanese premier league table with 6 points difference from the second position. on 22 January 2021 Gomes resigned as the head coach of Al-Merrikh to take charge of Simba SC The Tanzanian Giant.

=== Simba S.C. ===
On 24 January 2021, the Tanzanian giant Simba SC appoint Didier Gomes as the new head coach, after terminated his contract with Al-Merrikh SC. the club announce the main target this season is to reach the quarter-final of the African champions league and win the Tanzanian league. in 6 matches in the African champions league group, Simba achieved 13 points after won 4 matches, draw 1 and lost 1 match to take lead of the group and qualify to the quarter-final. Didier Gomes created a new record by his name with Simba after achieved 13 points in the group stage to be the first Tanzanian club to reach this number of points. Also, won the first match ever for any Tanzanian club in away match in any African trophies in the group stage; as they won 1–0 against the Congolese side vita club.

After leading Simba in 37 games, in which he won 27, draw 5 and lose 5 and won two titles, on 26 October 2021, Simba announced that Didier Gomes has resigned in a mutual agreement.

This came just few days after Simba was knocked out of CAF Champions League after they threw away a 2–0 lead from the first leg to lose 3–1 at home against Botswana debutants Jwaneng Galaxy and crush out of the competition.

Simba were eliminated on the away goal rule after a 3-3 aggregate result and are now have to contend in the CAF Confederation Cup play-off round.

=== Al-Wehdat SC ===
On 1 June 2022, Didier Gomes was appointed as the new head coach of the Jordan giant Al wehdat, he take charge of the team when the team was in the 6th position. However, he achieved the 2nd position in the Jordan league with one point less than the champions. Meanwhile, he won the Jordan cup with Al Wehdat for the first time since 2013 to lead them to the AFC Champions league 2023

=== Saudi Arabia ===
On 17 November 2022, Gomes was appointed as the manager of Saudi Arabian clubAl-Ain FC. Gomes took charge of the team in the last position of the league, but he succeed to save the team from relegation to the second division after won 9 games.

On 7 June 2023, Gomes was appointed as the manager of Al-Taraji. Gomes took charge of Al-Taraji the promoted team from the Second Division. In three months in charge, he managed the team to be in the top 10 positions. On 26 November, Gomes decided to resign due to financial crises in the club.

=== Botswana National Team ===
On the 3rd of November 2023 Didier Gomes was Appointed as the new Head coach For Botswana National Team, Preparing for the World Cup 2026 Qualifications. After lead the team to Qualify to AFCON 2025, he decided to resigned due to his dissatisfaction with the lack of support from the Botswana Football Association for the senior national team.

=== Al Ahli SC (Tripoli) ===
On 16th of October 2024 Didier Appointed as the new head coach of Al Ahli SC (Tripoli) after the club failed to reach the group stage of the CAF Confederation Cup. The club Signed Dider gomes because of his big experience in Africa to bring the club back to win the trophies.

=== Al-Adalah ===
On 18 November 2025, Didier was appointed as manager of Saudi FDL club Al-Adalah. He was sacked on 18 March 2026.

== Personal life ==
Born in France, Gomes Da Rosa has one daughter.

== Managerial statistics ==
As of match played 19 November 2024

Managerial record by team and tenure
Team	From	To	Record					Ref.
Team	From	To	P	W	D	L	Win %	Ref.
Rayon Sports	1 February 2013	30 June 2014	45	31	6	8	68.9	
Coton Sport	1 July 2014	30 October 2015	62	33	18	11	53.2	
CS Constantine	9 November 2015	11 September 2016	27	10	8	9	37.0	
JSM Skikda	18 September 2016	10 December 2017	42	19	8	15	45.2	
Ethiopian Coffee	26 December 2017	30 June 2018	20	10	5	5	50.0	
Horoya AC	20 March 2019	10 November 2019	25	16	4	5	64.0	
Ismaily	8 January 2020	25 August 2020	13	5	5	3	38.5	
Al-Merrikh SC	19 November 2020	22 January 2021	10	6	3	1	60.0	
Simba S.C.	24 January 2021	24 October 2021	40	30	5	5	75.0	
Mauritania	18 November 2021	3 March 2022	8	1	2	5	12.5	
Al-Wehdat	1 June 2022	20 November 2022	22	16	4	2	72.7	
Al-Ain FC	21 November 2022	31 May 2023	23	9	4	10	39.1	
Al-Taraji Club	1 July 2023	26 October 2023	8	3	1	4	37.5	
Botswana	3 November 2023	16 October 2024	16	6	6	4	37.5	
Al Ahli SC (Tripoli)	16 October 2024	20 March 2025	14	11	3	0	78.6	
Al-Adalah	18 November 2025	18 March 2026	18	2	6	10	11.1	
Total			369	191	85	93	51.8	—

== Honours ==
Rayon Sports F.C.

- Kagame Interclub Cup: 2013
- Rwanda Premier League: 2012–13

Coton Sport FC de Garoua

- Elite One: 2014, 2015
- Cameroonian Cup: Cameroonian Cup

Ethiopian Coffee S.C.

- Addis Ababa City Cup: 2018

Horoya AC

- Guinée Championnat National: 2018–19
- Guinée Coupe Nationale: 2019

Ismaily SC

- Arab Club Champions Cup: Semi-finals 2019-20

Simba S.C.

- Tanzanian Premier League: 2020-21
- Tanzania FA Cup: 2020-21

Al-Wehdat SC

- Jordan FA Cup: Winner 2022
- Jordanian Pro League: Runner up 2022

== Personal achievements ==
- Award Best Coach in Tanzania 2020-2021
- Award 4th Best Coach in Africa 2020-2021 "Ghana Sports Magazine"
- Award Best Coach in Sudan November and December 2020
- Award Best Coach in Cameroon 2014
- 3rd Best French Coach in Africa – Zarpa Awards 2015
