= Football in Rwanda =

- Governing body: Rwandese Association Football Federation
- National team: men's national team

Club competitions
- Rwandan Premier League

International competitions
- Champions League; CAF Confederation Cup; Super Cup; FIFA Club World Cup; FIFA World Cup (National Team); African Cup of Nations (National Team)

The sport of football in the country of Rwanda is run by the Rwandese Association Football Federation. The association administers the national football team, as well as the Rwandan Premier League. With approximately 30% of the people in Rwanda considered association football fans, football is the most popular sport in Rwanda.

== National team ==
The Rwanda national team has traditionally been among the weaker sides in African football. They have attempted to qualify for the Africa Cup of Nations on a number of occasions but managed this only once, in 2004. Although eliminated in the first round Rwanda did manage to defeat former champions Congo DR and draw with Guinea.

They also participate in the CECAFA Cup, a regional tournament involving east and central African national teams only. Rwanda's sole international success came in this competition when the country's 'B' team defeated Kenya in the final. Rwanda's full national team, which also took part in the competition, actually finished third with the second string winning.

As of December 2014, the Rwandan national team had attained its historic record ranking on FIFA rankings that were released on Thursday, Dec 18, 2014. Rwanda was ranked 68th globally, 19th in Africa, and 1st in East Africa. The Amavubi are the biggest mover on the world rankings, 22 places from 90th position in November 2014 following a goalless draw in Marrakesh versus the Morocco national team.

== Club football ==
The Rwandan Premier League is the country's top competition, with APR FC its most successful club. The Rwandan Cup is the main knock-out competition, with Rayon Sports FC the leading side in the cup. On the international stage Rwandan sides have enjoyed some success in the regional Kagame Inter-Club Cup, with Rayon Sport taking the title in 1998, APR FC winning in 2005 and 2007 and ATRACO FC successful in 2009.

As of 2013 they are the only country in East Africa to have an established women's football league, the Rwanda Women's Football League.

== Football stadiums in Rwanda ==
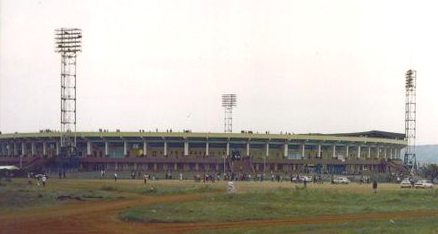
The Amahoro Stadium before the renovation works started.

This is a list with football stadiums in Rwanda with a capacity of at least 5,000. The largest non-football stadium by capacity in Rwanda is the 10,000-capacity indoor stadium named BK Arena.

Stadium	Capacity	City	Tenants	Image
Amahoro Stadium	45,000	Kigali	Rwanda national football team	
Kigali Pelé Stadium	22,000	Kigali	APR FC, Rayon Sports	
Stade Huye	10,000	Butare		

== Attendances ==
The average attendance per top-flight football league season and the club with the highest average attendance:

Season	League average	Best club	Best club average
2022-23	933	APR FC	2,665

Source: League page on Wikipedia

== See also ==
- Lists of stadiums
