= Dany Usengimana =

Rwandan international footballer

Personal information
- Date of birth: 10 March 1996 (age 30)
- Place of birth: Kigali, Rwanda
- Height: 1.87 m (6 ft 2 in)
- Position: Forward

Team information
- Current team: AS Laval

Senior career*
Years	Team	Apps	(Gls)
2014–2015	Isonga		(7)
2015–2017	Police		(35)
2017–2018	Singida United		(6)
2018–2019	Tersana SC		(2)
2019–2021	APR		(12)
2021–2023	Police F.C.		(11)
2023–	Rwanda		

International career
2016–	Rwanda	15	(1)
- * Club domestic league appearances and goals

Dany Usengimana (born 10 March 1996), commonly known as Usengimana, is a Rwandan international footballer who plays as centre-forward for AS Laval

== Club career ==
In August 2017, Usengimana joined Tanzanian club Singida United F.C., on a two-year contract for a fee of $80,000 and $30,000 per year. He played various teams in Rwanda including APR F.C. and Police F.C. He was a squad member for the 2016 and 2020 African Nations Championships. He was the winner of the Rwanda Premier League with APR F.C. and the top scorer in the team with 11 goals. Usengimana was the top scorer of the Rwandan Premier League's first division in two consecutive seasons with Police F.C.. He had 16 goals in the 2015–2016 season and 19 goals in the 2016–2017 season.
