= Ivan Minnaert =

Belgian football coach

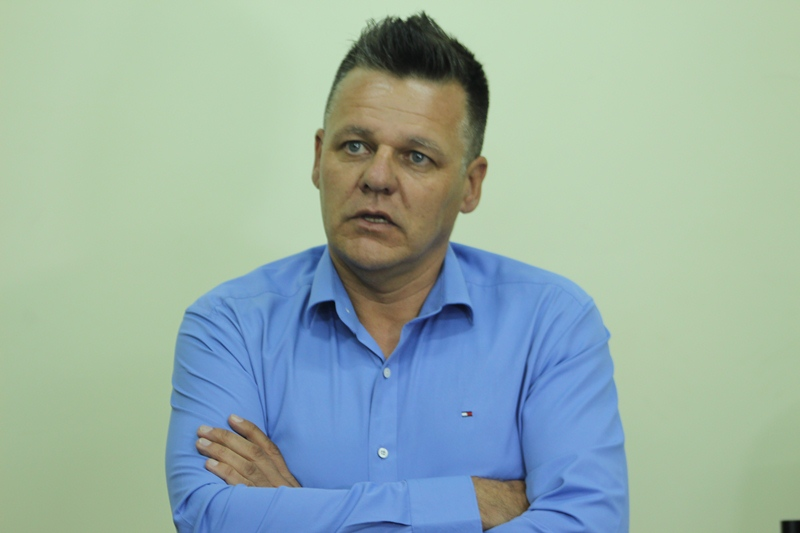
- Ivan Minnaert press conference

Personal information
- Full name: Ivan Jacky Minnaert
- Place of birth: Belgium

Managerial career
- Years: Team
- 2002–2005: CD Guadiaro (youth)
- 2007–2009: Atlético Zabal
- 2009–2011: Unión Estepona CF
- 2011–2012: UD Testorillo
- 2012–2013: CD San Roque
- 2013: VB Addu FC
- 2014: Al-Ittihad (youth)
- 2014–2015: Djoliba AC
- 2015–2016: Rayon Sports F.C.
- 2016: AFC Leopards
- 2017: Mukura Victory Sports F.C.
- 2017: AS Kaloum Star
- 2017: Black Leopards F.C.
- 2018: Rayon Sports F.C.
- 2018–2020: Al-Ittihad Tripoli
- 18th July 2025- 7th June 2025: Vipers SC

Ivan Jacky Minnaert is a Belgian football coach who was assigned to Vipers SC of the Startimes Uganda Premier League and they parted their ways on mutual ground after his contract expired. He holds a Union of European Football Associations (UEFA) Professional Licence, the highest football coaching qualification. He received the UEFA Pro Licence in 2012 from the Football Association of Spain.

== Career ==
=== Mali ===
Presented the head coach of Djoliba AC in autumn 2014, Minnaert set his sights on staying at the club for ten years and earning at least one trophy for them but stepped down from his position in 2015 when Djoliba games were invalidated, causing relegation to the second division before visiting Mali again in 2017.

=== Kenya ===
Negotiating a contract with AFC Leopards of the Kenyan Premier League in early 2016, the Belgian signed a two-year deal with Ingwe in late February, ending the unbeaten run of 35 games in the KPL of Gor Mahia, voted KPL coach of the month March but was fired by August for poor results, including a six-game winless run, despite being second early on, with some urging him to step down beforehand. In the end, he decided to sue AFC Leopards for salaries owed, which amounted to 24000 US dollars.

=== Guinea ===
Replacing Adda Benamar at AS Kaloum Star in mid 2017, Minnaert made the quarterfinals of the Guinée Coupe Nationale, his task was to escape relegation what he did.

=== South Africa ===
Assisting fellow Belgian Jean-François Losciuto at Black Leopards of the South African National First Division in late autumn 2017, the former director became caretaker of the team a few days later, making it the objective to achieve promotion and applied an offensive system in the team. However, when directing them to 10th place in 15 matches, he was slated to be fired.

=== Rwanda ===
Accepting a six-month contract with Mukura Victory at the start of 2017, the former Rayon Sport coach pledged to improve results and turn around the season, beating Pepiniere FC 1–0 in his debut at the end of his contract arranging a deal with AS Kaloum Star of Guinea that summer.

Head coach of Rayon Sports of the Rwanda National Football League from November 2015 to February 2016, he was awarded another contract with Gikundiro in spring 2018, taking them to the 2018 CAF Confederation Cup, historic qualification of a Rwandian team, where they were pooled with USM Alger, Young Africans, and Gor Mahia in Group D and stated that reaching the quarterfinals would be an onerous task.

=== Libya ===
Appointed as technical director of the academy and head coach of the U20, the 3 teams under his supervision win all the games of the league (U15 : 9 wins; U17 : 9 wins; U20 : 9 wins) In a friendly game against the first team, the team he coached (the U20) impress everybody. A few weeks later he take over the first team and started with a 2–0 win against AlIttihad Misrata, after a 3–0 win against Rafeeq the league stopped in April due to the circumstances in the country. After a break of 4 months he started a short preparation of 2 weeks to classify Al Ittihad for the 1/16 finals of the CAF Confederation cup against USGN of Niger (1–1 away game and 2–0 win home game) Stats : First division Libyan league : 2 Games 2 Wins (goals 5–0) Caf Confederation Cup : 2 Games 1 draw 1 win (goals 3–1)

=== Uganda ===
On 18 July 2025, he was appointed as the head coach of Vipers SC. He took a managerial role in this great Ugandan club led by Lawrence Mulindwa. He led the team to their eighth Uganda Premier League title as well as the Uganda Cup semi-finals, though they were eliminated by Kitara FC. Minnaert earned the 2025/26 Uganda Premier League Coach of the Season award for outstanding achievements. Later, he departed on 7 June 2026 following expiry of his contract.

=== CAF Competitions ===
CAF CHAMPIONS LEAGUE : WINS 5 DRAW 2 LOST 2 CAF CONFEDERATION CUP : WINS 4 DRAW 2 LOST 2 CAF GROUP STAGE : WINS 2 DRAW 3 LOST 1

== See also ==
- Vipers SC
- UEFA Pro Licence
- Lawrence Mulindwa.
