= Clement Niyigena =

Rwandan footballer

Personal information
- Date of birth: February 17, 2001 (age 25)
- Place of birth: Muhanga District
- Height: 1.82 m (6 ft 0 in)
- Positions: Central defender; center-back

Team information
- Current team: APR FC
- Number: 17

Youth career
- 2017: APR FC Academy
- 2017-2018: Intare FC
- 2018-2020: Marine FC
- 2020-2022: Rayon Sports F.C.
- 2022-: APR F.C.

International career^{‡}
| Years | Team | Apps | (Gls) |
| 2022– | Rwanda | 12 | (0) |
- ‡ National team caps and goals as of 12:49, 3 April 2025 (UTC)

Clement Niyigena, born on February 17, 2001, is a Rwandan footballer who plays as a central defender and center-back for APR FC and Rwanda National Football Team.

== Club career ==
Clement Niyigena was born in Muhanga District in Rwanda, and began his football career in the second division, signing with APR's academy called Intare FC. After he joined in APR FC, he won 5 goals from 2022 to 2024. He played for various teams in Rwanda including Rayon Sports and APR FC. He arrived at Rayon Sports in September 2020. After proving himself for the past two years, APR FC had sold him at the time, bringing him back; he was previously from Marines FC. In Rayon Sport, he got award as Young Player of the season 2021–2022.
