= Abubaker Lawal =

Nigerian footballer

Abubakar Lawal
Personal information
- Full name: Abubakar Lawal
- Date of birth: 3 September 1995 (age 31)
- Place of birth: Sokoto Nigeria
- Date of death: 23 February 2025
- Place of death: Kajjansi Uganda
- Height: 1.78 m (5 ft 10 in)
- Position: Forward

Team information
- Current team: Vipers SC
- Number: 11

Senior career*
Years	Team	Apps	(Gls)
2019	Wikki Tourists F.C.		
2020	Nasarawa United		
2022	AS Kigali		
2022-2025	Vipers SC		
- * Club domestic league appearances and goals as of 19:29, 26 February 2025 (UTC)

Abubakar Lawal or sometimes spelt as "Abubaker Lawal" (born 5 September 1995) was a Nigerian professional footballer who played as a forward for Vipers SC in the Uganda Premier League.

== Career ==
Lawal started his professional career with Wikki Tourists in January 2019, where he played for one season before moving to Nasarawa United in November 2020. In July 2022, he joined AS Kigali before eventually signing with Vipers SC.

One of his most notable accomplishments was scoring Vipers SC’s first-ever group-stage goal in the CAF Champions League, securing a 1–1 draw against Raja Casablanca.

== Death ==
On 23 February 2025, it was reported that Lawal had fallen from a third-floor balcony at the Voicemall Shopping Arcade, Kajjansi, where he had gone to visit a Tanzanian friend according to the Uganda Police Force.

== External References ==
- https://www.flashscore.com/player/lawal-abubakar/hCBrkOSi/
- https://www.sofascore.com/player/abubakar-lawal/1024100
- https://kawowo.com/2025/02/24/abubaker-lawal-vipers-nigerian-footballer-dies/
- https://businessday.ng/sports/article/who-was-abubakar-lawal-the-nigerian-footballer-who-died-in-uganda/
