= Marines F.C. =

Marines F.C. may refer to:

- Marines F.C. (Rwanda)
- Marines F.C. (Thailand)

== See also ==
- Marine A.F.C., England
