= Rutsiro FC =

Football team in the Rwandan Premier League

Rutsiro F.C.
- Full name: Rutsiro Football Club
- Ground: Umuganda Stadium; Gisenyi, Rwanda
- Capacity: 5,000
- Manager: Niyonkuru Gustave
- League: Rwanda Premier League
- 2025–26: 18th (relegated)
| Home colours | Away colours | Third colours |

Rutsiro Football Club is an association football club based in Rutsiro District, Rwanda. The team currently competes in the Rwanda Premier League. The club previously played their home games in the Mukebera Stadium, until the stadium failed to meet the standards required by the local football governing body (FERWAFA) and the club played their home matches in the Umuganda Stadium during the 2024–25 season.

== Seasonal placement ==
| Season | League | Level | Place |
|---|---|---|---|
| 2019–20 | Rwandan Second Division | 2 | 2. |
| 2020–21 | Rwanda Premier League | 1 | 6. |
| 2021–22 | Rwanda Premier League | 1 | 14. |
| 2022–23 | Rwanda Premier League | 1 | ▼15th |
| 2023–24 | Rwandan Second Division | 2 | 1. |
| 2024–25 | Rwanda Premier League | 1 | 9. |
| 2025–26 | Rwanda Premier League | 1 | ▼18th |

Source: rsssf.org
