= Mukungwa F.C. =

Rwandan football club

Mukungwa
- Full name: Mukungwa
- Ground: Stade Regional de Kigali; Kigali, Rwanda
- Capacity: 12,000
- League: Rwandan Premier League

Mukungwa Ruhengeri is a football club from Ruhengeri in Rwanda.

In 1988 the team has won the Rwandan Premier League.

== Stadium ==
The team plays at the Stade Regional de Kigali.

== Performance in CAF competitions ==
- CAF Champions League:

1989 African Cup of Champions Clubs – First Round

== Honours ==
- Rwandan Premier League: 2

1988, 1989
