= Electrogaz F.C. =

Rwandan association football club

Electrogaz FC
- Full name: Établissement Rwandais de Distribution de l’Eau, de l’Electricité et de Gaz
- Founded: 2008; 17 years ago
- Dissolved: 2010; 15 years ago
- League: Rwanda Premier League

Electrogaz FC is a football club in the Rwanda National Football League. The team was founded in 2008. It is named after Rwanda's electricity and water utility company Electrogaz. In 2010 they were expelled from the Premier League because the players were not being paid.
