= Panthères Noires =

Rwandan football club

- Full name: Panthères Noires Kigali
- Founded: 1965
- Dissolved: 1989
- Ground: Stade Regional de Kigali; Kigali, Rwanda
- Capacity: 12,000
- League: Rwandan Premier League

Panthères Noires Kigali was a football club from Kigali in Rwanda.

In 1980 the team has won the Rwandan Premier League.

Panthères Noirs were an army side and as such probably a forerunner of APR FC (Kigali).

== Stadium ==
The team plays at the Stade Regional de Kigali.

== Performance in CAF competitions ==
- CAF Champions League: 1 appearance

1986 African Cup of Champions Clubs – First Round

== Achievements ==
- Rwandan Premier League
  - Winners (5): 1980, 1984, 1985, 1986, 1987
- Rwandan Cup
  - Winners (4): 1981, 1983, 1984, 1987
