= Juma Masudi =

Burundian footballer

Personal information
- Date of birth: 30 August 1977 (age 49)
- Place of birth: Bujumbura, Burundi
- Position: Striker

Team information
- Current team: Inter Star

Senior career*
Years	Team	Apps	(Gls)
2002	Prince Louis		
2003–2009	Rayon Sport		
2010−	Inter Star		

International career^{‡}
1995	Rwanda	2	(0)
1998–2003	Burundi	10	(1)
- * Club domestic league appearances and goals as of 9 November 2007 ‡ National team caps and goals as of 9 November 2007

Juma Masudi (born 30 August 1977 in Bujumbura) is a Burundian footballer who plays for Inter Star as a striker.

== International career ==
He was member of both the Rwanda and Burundi national teams and played 3 games in the 1995 FIFA World Youth Championship in Qatar.
