= Espérance F.C. (Rwanda) =

Rwandan football club

Espérance
- Full name: Espérance Football Club
- Ground: Stade Mumena; Kigali, Rwanda
- Capacity: 1,250
- League: Rwandan Second Division
- 2013–14: 13th (relegated)

Espérance Football Club is an association football club based in Kigali, Rwanda. They currently compete in the Rwanda National Football League, and play their home games at the Stade Mumena.
