= Umuganda Stadium =

Multi-use stadium in Gisenyi, Rwanda

Stade Umuganda
- Interactive map of Stade Umuganda
- Full name: Stade Umuganda
- Location: Gisenyi, Rwanda
- Coordinates: 1.6755°S 29.2626°E
- Capacity: 5,000

Tenant
- Etincelles FC Marines F.C.

The Stade Umuganda is a multi-use stadium in Gisenyi, Rwanda. It is currently used mostly for football matches, on club level by Etincelles FC and Marines F.C. of the Rwandan Premier League. The stadium has a capacity of 5,000 spectators. The Stade Umuganda has an artificial turf field and a training field as well. There are also four team dressing rooms as well as VIP and media sections. This stadium hosted the Pool D matches of the 2016 African nations championship. Floodlights and a scoreboard are expected to be added by November 2016.
