= Isonga F.C. =

Rwandan football club

Isonga FC
- Full name: Isonga Football Club
- Founded: 2011
- Ground: Stade Mumena, Kigali
- Capacity: 1200

Isonga FC is a Rwandan football club, based in Kigali.

== History ==
The club was founded in 2011.

In June 2013, the club released their entire playing staff after being relegated from the Primus National Football League.
