= Rwanda Premier League =

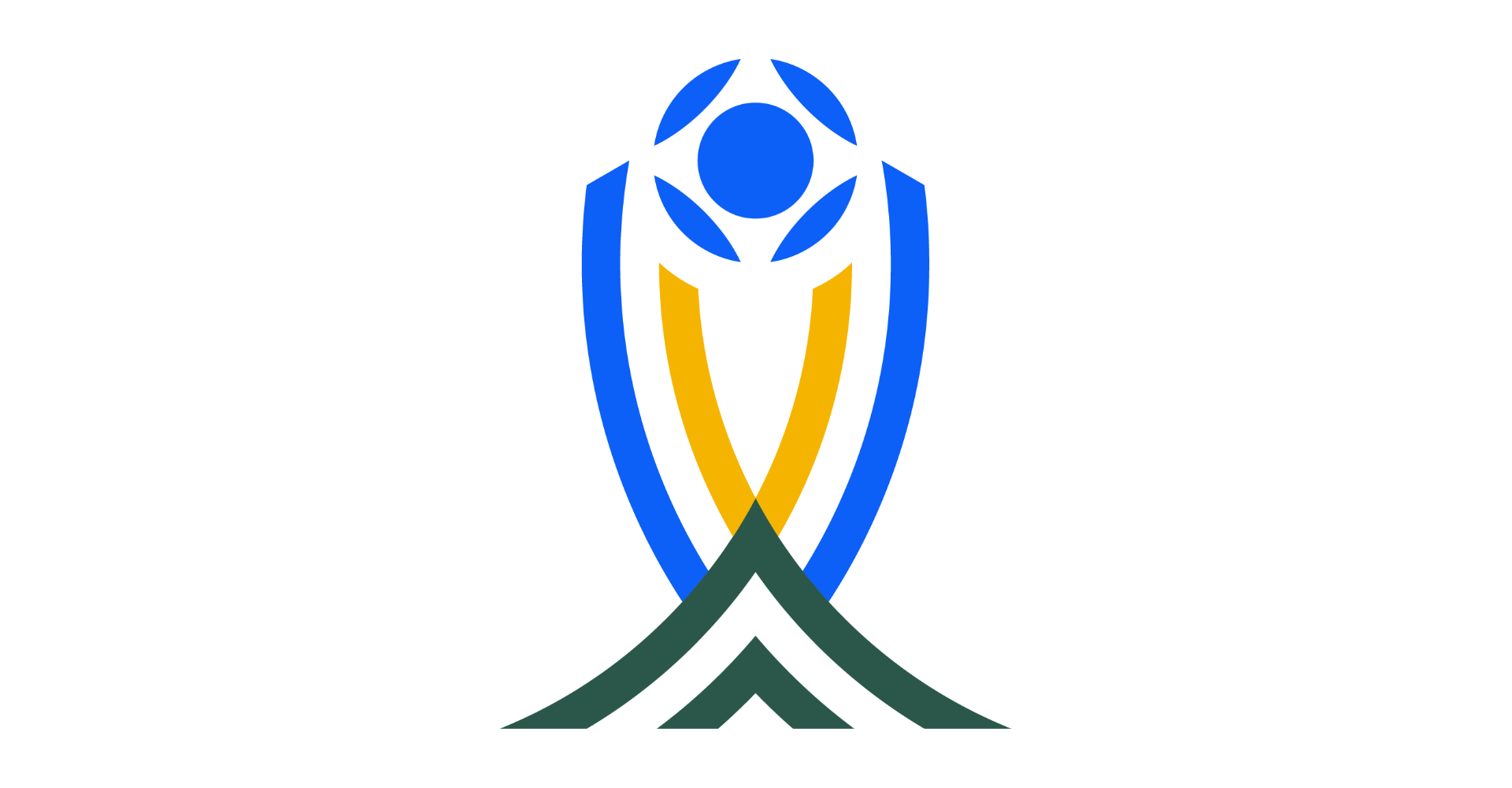
- Organising body: Rwanda Football Federation (FERWAFA)
- Founded: 1968; 58 years ago
- Country: Rwanda
- Confederation: CECAFA
- Number of clubs: 18
- Level on pyramid: 1
- Relegation to: Rwandan Second Division
- Domestic cup(s): Rwandan Cup; Rwandan Super Cup
- International cup(s): CAF Champions League; CAF Confederation Cup
- Current champions: Al-Hilal (1st title) (2025–26)
- Most championships: APR (23 titles)
- Broadcaster(s): RTV; Magic Sports TV; StarTimes
- Website: rwandapremierleague.rw
- Current: 2026–27 Rwanda Premier League

The Rwanda Premier League (RPL) is the highest division of football in Rwanda. The league was formed in 1975. It was known as the Primus National Football League in 2004 and from 2009–10 to 2012–13, after which sponsorship was taken over by Turbo King. The league was renamed the Azam Rwanda Premier League for the 2015–16 season after Tanzanian television broadcasters Azam TV were announced as sponsors in a deal worth US$2.35 million covering five years. From 2019 to 2020 season Azam TV announced the termination of its contract with Rwanda FA.

The Rwanda Football Federation announced in October 2025 that two Sudanese clubs, Al Hilal and Al Merrikh, would compete in the Rwanda Premier League due to the ongoing civil war. They had been playing in the top-flight Mauritania league and returned to Sudan for a shortened season tournament to determine continental qualification. The Confederation of African Football approved the temporary transfers on 19 November after the season had already begun. Both teams returned to the RPL for the 2026-27 season.

== Clubs ==
As of the 2025–26 season

Team	Location
Amagaju	Nyamagabe District
APR	Kigali
AS Kigali	Kigali
AS Muhanga	Muhanga
Bugesera	Nyamata
Etincelles	Gisenyi
Gasogi United	Kigali
Gorilla	Kigali
Gicumbi	Byumba
Kiyovu Sports	Kigali
Marines	Gisenyi
Mukura Victory	Butare
Musanze	Ruhengeri
Police	Kigali
Rayon Sports	Nyanza
Rutsiro	Rutsiro

== Previous champions ==
- 1968 : Kiyovu Sports (Kigali)
- 1970 : Kiyovu Sports (Kigali)
- 1973 : Kiyovu Sports (Kigali)
- 1975 : Rayon Sports (Nyanza)
- 1976–79 : unknown
- 1980 : Panthères Noires (Kigali)
- 1981 : Rayon Sports (Nyanza)
- 1982 : no championship
- 1983 : Kiyovu Sports (Kigali)
- 1984 : Panthères Noires (Kigali)
- 1985 : Panthères Noires (Kigali)
- 1986 : Panthères Noires (Kigali)
- 1987 : Panthères Noires (Kigali)
- 1988 : Mukungwa (Ruhengeri)
- 1989 : Mukungwa (Ruhengeri)
- 1990 : Kiyovu Sports (Kigali)
- 1992 : Kiyovu Sports (Kigali)
- 1993 : Kiyovu Sports (Kigali)
- 1994–95 : APR (Kigali)
- 1996 : APR (Kigali)
- 1997 : Rayon Sports (Nyanza)
- 1998 : Rayon Sports (Nyanza)
- 1999 : APR (Kigali)
- 2000 : APR (Kigali)
- 2001 : APR (Kigali)
- 2002 : Rayon Sports (Nyanza)
- 2003 : APR (Kigali)
- 2004 : Rayon Sports (Nyanza)
- 2005 : APR (Kigali)
- 2006 : APR (Kigali)
- 2006–07 : APR (Kigali)
- 2007–08 : ATRACO (Kigali)
- 2008–09 : APR (Kigali)
- 2009–10 : APR (Kigali)
- 2010–11 : APR (Kigali)
- 2011–12 : APR (Kigali)
- 2012–13 : Rayon Sports (Nyanza)
- 2013–14 : APR (Kigali)
- 2014–15 : APR (Kigali)
- 2015–16 : APR (Kigali)
- 2016–17 : Rayon Sports (Nyanza)
- 2017–18 : APR (Kigali)
- 2018–19 : Rayon Sports (Nyanza)
- 2019–20 : APR (Kigali)
- 2020–21 : APR (Kigali)
- 2021–22 : APR (Kigali)
- 2022–23 : APR (Kigali)
- 2023–24 : APR (Kigali)
- 2024–25 : APR (Kigali)
- 2025–26 : Al-Hilal

== Performances ==
=== Performances by club ===
Club	City	Titles	Winning Years
APR	Kigali	24	1994–95, 1996, 1999, 2000, 2001, 2003, 2005, 2006, 2006–07, 2008–09, 2009–10, 2010–11, 2011–12, 2013–14, 2014–15, 2015–16, 2017–18, 2019–20, 2020–21, 2021–22, 2022–23, 2023–24, 2024–25, 2025–26
Rayon Sports	Nyanza	9	1975, 1981, 1997, 1998, 2002, 2004, 2012–13, 2016–17, 2018–19
Kiyovu Sports	Kigali	7	1968, 1970, 1973, 1983, 1990, 1992, 1993
Panthères Noires	Kigali	5	1980, 1984, 1985, 1986, 1987
Mukungwa	Ruhengeri	2	1988, 1989
ATRACO	Kigali	1	2008

== Top goalscorers ==
Season	Player	Club	Goals
2001	Luleuti Kyayuna	APR	9
2002	n/a	n/a	n/a
2003	Milly	APR	12
2004	(Rwanda) Abed Mulenda	Rayon Sports	14
2004	(Rwanda) Olivier Karekezi	APR	14
2005	(Rwanda) Jimmy Gatete	APR	13
2006	(Rwanda) André Lomami	APR	13
2006–07	(Democratic Republic of the Congo) Labama Bokota	Rayon Sports	14
2007–08	n/a	n/a	n/a
2008–09	(Rwanda) Jean Lomami	ATRACO	12
2010–11	(Rwanda) Meddie Kagere	Police	16
2011–12	(Rwanda) Olivier Karekezi	APR	14
2014–15	(Rwanda) Isaie Songa	APR	14
2016–17	(Rwanda) Dany Usengimana	Police	19
2019–20	(Rwanda) Samson Babua	Sunrise	15
2022–23	(Burundi) Hussein Shabani	Kigali	14
2023–24	(Nigeria) Ani Elijah	Bugesera	15
2023–24	(Nigeria) Victor Mbaoma	APR	15
