= A.S. Muhanga =

Rwandan football club

AS Muhanga
- Full name: Association Sportive Muhanga
- Ground: Muhanga Regional Stadium; Muhanga
- Capacity: 5,000
- League: Rwanda Premier League
- 2025–26: 17th (relegated)

Association Sportive Muhanga is an association football club based in Muhanga, Rwanda. The team currently competes in the Rwanda National Football League, and plays its home games at the Muhanga Regional Stadium.
