= Amagaju F.C. =

Rwandan football club

Amagaju Fc
- Full name: Amagaju Football Club
- Nickname: AMAGAJU FC " Inkuba Zesa"
- Founded: 1935
- Ground: Stade ya Nyamagabe (Nyagisenyi); Gikongoro, Nyamagabe District, Gasaka Sector Rwanda
- Capacity: 1,000
- Chairman: Paul Nshimiyumuremyi
- Manager: Amars Niyongabo
- League: Rwanda National Football League Division 1
- 2025–2026: 16th

Amagaju Football Club is an association football club from Nyamagabe District Southern Province, Rwanda. The team currently competes in the Rwanda National Football League, and plays its home games at the Stade de Nyamagabe known as Nyagisenyi.professional football club based in Nyamagabe District. Formed in 1935, the club plays its home games at the Nyagisenyi Stadium. Their home colors are yellow and blue. Amagaju is one of the old clubs in Rwanda, with 5 old trophies.
