= Rwandan Cup =

Rwanda Peace Cup
- Organiser(s): FERWAFA
- Founded: 1975; 51 years ago
- Region: Rwanda
- Teams: 32 (2022–23)
- Qualifier for: CAF Confederations Cup
- Domestic cup: FERWAFA Super Cup
- Current champions: APR FC (14th title)
- Most championships: APR FC (14 titles)
- 2025 Rwandan Cup

The Rwanda Peace Cup previously known as The Rwanda Cup is the top knockout tournament of the Rwandan football. It was created and first played in 1975, with the inaugural edition being won by Kiyovu Sports.

The competition is open to all clubs in Rwanda's first and second divisions. The winners qualify for the CAF Confederation Cup and a place in the FERWAFA Super Cup, an upcoming season curtain raiser match against the winners of the Rwanda Premier League. APR FC are the most successful club with fourteen titles.

== Winners ==
List of Rwandan Cup Winners
Year	Winner
1975	Kiyovu Sports
1976	Rayon Sport
1977	—N/a
1978	Mukura Victory Sports
1979	Rayon Sport
1980	Rayon Sport
1981	Panthères Noires
1982	Rayon Sport
1983	Panthères Noires
1984	Panthères Noires
1985	Kiyovu Sports
1986	Mukura Victory Sports
1987	Panthères Noires
1988	Etincelles FC
1989	Rayon Sport
1990	Mukura Victory Sports
1991	—N/a
1992	Mukura Victory Sports
1993	Rayon Sport
1994–95	APR FC
1996	APR FC
1997	Rwanda FC
1998	Rayon Sport
1999	APR FC
2000	APR FC
2001	Les Citadins FC
2002	APR FC
2003	Rayon Sport
2004	—N/a
2005	Rayon Sport
2006	APR FC
2007	APR FC
2008	APR FC
2009	ATRACO FC
2010	APR FC
2011	APR FC
2012	APR FC
2013	AS Kigali
2014	APR FC
2015	Police FC
2016	Rayon Sport
2017	APR FC
2018	Mukura Victory Sports
2019	AS Kigali
2020 to 2021	Not held due to COVID-19 pandemic
2022	AS Kigali
2023	Rayon Sports FC
2024	Police FC
2025	APR FC
2026	APR FC

== Records and statistics ==
=== Performances by club ===
Club	Winners	Years won
APR FC	14	1994, 1996, 1999, 2000, 2002, 2006, 2007, 2008, 2010, 2011, 2012, 2014, 2017, 2026
Rayon Sport	10	1976, 1979, 1980, 1982, 1989, 1993, 1998, 2003, 2005, 2016, 2023
Mukura Victory Sports	5	1978, 1986, 1990, 1992, 2018
Panthères Noires	4	1981, 1983, 1984, 1987
AS Kigali	3	2013, 2019, 2022
Kiyovu Sports	2	1975, 1985
Police FC	2	2015, 2024
ATRACO FC	1	2009
Etincelles FC	1	1988
Les Citadins	1	2001
Rwanda FC	1	1997

=== Performance by province ===
Province	Won
Kigali	26
Southern	14
Western	1
Eastern	1
Northern	0

=== Performance by city ===
Cities	Won
Kigali	26
Nyanza	9
Butare	5
Gisenyi	1
Kibungo	1
