= Espoir F.C. (Rwanda) =

Rwandan football club

Espoir FC
- Full name: Espoir Football Club
- Nickname: The Blessed
- Founded: 1972
- Ground: Rusizi Stadium, Rwanda
- Capacity: 4,000
- Chairman: KAMUZINZI Godefroid
- Manager: Jean Pierre
- League: Rwanda Premier League
- 2021–22: 10th

Espoir Football Club is an association football club based in Rusizi, Rwanda. The team currently competes in the Rwanda Premier League, and plays its home games at the Rusizi Stadium.
