= Gicumbi F.C. =

Rwandan football club

Gicumbi
- Full name: Gicumbi Football Club
- Ground: Gicumbi Stadium; Byumba, Rwanda
- Capacity: 6,000
- League: Rwandan Second Division
- 2025–26: 12th

Gicumbi Football Club is an association football club from Byumba, Rwanda. They currently compete in the Rwandan Second Division, and play their home games at the Gicumbi Stadium.

After finishing last and suffering relegation from the top division in 2022, Gicumbi barely missed out on promotion to the 2023/24 Rwanda Premier League.
