= Musanze F.C. =

Rwandan football club

Musanze
- Full name: Musanze Football Club
- Ground: Ubworoherane Football Stadium; Musanze, Rwanda
- Capacity: 4,000
- Chairman: Tuyishime Placide
- Manager: Sosthene Habimana
- League: Rwanda Premier League
- 2025–26: 10th
Home colours

Musanze Football Club is an association football club based in Musanze, Rwanda. The team currently competes in the Rwanda National Football League, and plays its home games at the Ubworoherane Football Stadium.
