= Etincelles F.C. =

Rwandan football club

Etincelles
- Full name: Etincelles Football Club
- Ground: Umuganda Stadium; Gisenyi, Rwanda
- Capacity: 5,000
- League: Rwanda National Football League
- 2025–26: 13th
Home colours

Etincelles Football Club is an association football club based in Gisenyi, Rwanda. They currently compete in the Rwanda National Football League and play their home games at the 5,000-capacity Umuganda Stadium.

== Achievements ==
- Rwandan Cup: 1

1988

== Performance in CAF competitions ==
As of 17 September 2013

Competition	Matches	W	D	L	GF	GA
CAF Confederation Cup	2	0	1	1	1	3
African Cup Winners' Cup	4	1	2	1	2	2
Total	6	1	3	2	3	5

Season	Competition	Round	Country	Club	Home	Away	Aggregate
1989	African Cup Winners' Cup	PR	(Burundi)	Vital'O	1–1	1–0	2–1
1989	African Cup Winners' Cup	PR	(Zaire)	AS Kalamu	0–0	0–1	0–1
2011	CAF Confederation Cup	PR	(Republic of the Congo)	AC Léopards	0–2	1–1	1–3
