= Mukura Victory Sports F.C. =

Association football club in Rwanda

Mukura Victory Sports et Loisirs
- Full name: Mukura Victory Sports et Loisirs Football Club
- Founded: 1963; 63 years ago
- Ground: Stade Huye; Butare, Rwanda
- Capacity: 10,000
- Chairman: Jean Damascène Maniraguha
- Manager: Sébastien Ndayishimiye
- League: Rwanda Premier League
- 2025–26: Rwanda Premier League, 7th
- Website: http://www.mukuravictorysport.rw
Home colours	Away colours

Mukura Victory Sports et Loisirs Football Club, commonly known as Mukura Victory Sports or simply Mukura, is a professional association football club from Butare, Rwanda. Founded in May 1963, the club currently competes in the Rwanda Premier League and plays its home games at Stade Huye.

Mukura victory sports et Loisirs football club in February had stopped APR FC 51 unbeaten games in Rwanda premier league.

== History ==
They won the Rwandan Cup on August 12, 2018, after beating Rayon Sports (3–1) on penalty shootout. The regular time had ended on 0–0 draw.

== Honours ==
=== Domestic competitions ===
- Rwanda National Football League:
  - Winners (5): 1978, 1986, 1990, 1992, 2018
  - Runners-up (3): 1992, 1998, 1999
- Rwandan Cup:
  - Winners (5): 1978, 1986, 1990, 1992, 2018
  - Runners-up (4): 1987, 1999, 2005, 2009

== Performance in CAF & CECAFA competitions ==
=== CAF competitions ===
As of 27 March 2021

Competition	Matches	W	D	L	GF	GA
African Cup Winners' Cup	12	3	1	8	9	25
CAF Cup	4	1	1	2	2	4
CAF Confederation Cup	6	2	3	1	2	3
Total	22	6	5	11	13	32

Season	Competition	Round	Club	Home	Away	Aggregate
1982	African Cup Winners' Cup	First round	(Tanzania) Pan African	0-4	0-4	0-8
1987	African Cup Winners' Cup	First round	(Egypt) Tersana	1-1	0-5	1-6
1988	African Cup Winners' Cup	Preliminary round	(Eswatini) Mbabane Highlanders	5-1	0-3	5-4
1988	African Cup Winners' Cup	First round	(Kenya) Gor Mahia	0-1	0-1	0-2
1993	African Cup Winners' Cup	Preliminary round	(Tanzania) Pamba	1-2	1-0	2-2 (a)
1994	CAF Cup	First round	(Zaire) AS Bantous	0-0	1-2	1-2
2000	CAF Cup	First round	(Ethiopia) Awassa Kenema	1-0	0-2	1-2
2001	African Cup Winners' Cup	First round	(Burundi) Atlético Olympic	1-0	0-3	1-3
2018/19	CAF Confederation Cup	Preliminary round	(South Africa) Free State Stars	1-0	0-0	1-0
2018/19	CAF Confederation Cup	First round	(Sudan) El Hilal SC El Obeid	0-0	0-0	0-0 (5-4 p)
2018/19	CAF Confederation Cup	Play-off round	(Sudan) Al-Hilal Club Omdurman	1-0	0-3	1-3

=== CECAFA competitions ===
Season	Round	Club	Score	Aggregate
2019 Kagame Interclub Cup	Group round	(Tanzania) Azam	0-1	4th place
2019 Kagame Interclub Cup	Group round	(Kenya) Bandari	2-2	4th place
2019 Kagame Interclub Cup	Group round	(Uganda) KCCA	1-2	4th place

== Current squad ==
Note: Flags indicate national team as defined under FIFA eligibility rules; some limited exceptions apply. Players may hold more than one non-FIFA nationality.

No.	Pos.	Nation	Player
1	DF	RWA	Mutijima Janvier
2	FW	RWA	Ndizeye Innocent
3	FW	RWA	Munezero Dieudonné
4	GK	RWA	Ingabire Aimé Regis
5	DF	RWA	Umwungeri Patrick
6	MF	RWA	Niyonkuru Ramadhan
7	FW	RWA	Iradukunda Jean Bertrand
8	FW	NGA	Lucky Emmanuel
9	MF	BDI	Iradukunda Barthelemy
10	GK	RWA	Bikorimana Gérard
11	DF	RWA	Rugirayabo Hassan
12	DF	RWA	Manzi Aimable

No.	Pos.	Nation	Player
13	FW	GHA	Muniru Abdul Rahman
14	FW	NGA	Nwosu Samuel Chukwudi
15	DF	RWA	Biraboneye Aphrodis
16	MF	RWA	Mbazumutima Mamadou
17	DF	RWA	Senzira Mansour
18	DF	RWA	Ngirimana Alex
19	DF	CMR	Olih Jacques
20	DF	RWA	Uwihoreye Jean Paul
21	MF	RWA	Mutabazi Hakim
22	FW	RWA	Ndayisenga Ramadhan
23	MF	RWA	Nwatli Evode
24	DF	RWA	Tuyishimire Eric

== Management ==
Name	Position
(Rwanda) Yves Nyirigira	President
(Rwanda) Mutuyimana Jean Paul	Vice President
(Rwanda) Musoni Protais	Managing Director
(Rwanda) Umuhoza Delphine	Treasurer

== Youth academy squad ==
Mukura have been helping a number of young players of the region to become known in the country. Among them the former Captain Nshimiyimana Canisius who is the Assistant Coach in the club. Mukura Youth System is made of more than 45 players from the age of 11 to 18. Gashugi Abdul Kareem,(brother of Mukura former midfielder Djuma Munyaneza) currently playing for Kiyovu SC is another product of Mukura Youth System.

== Stadium ==
The Home of Mukura V.S, Stade Huye, is located near the office of Huye District next the national road 1. The 10,000 all-seater stadium hosted the Group B matches of the 2016 Chan. It was constructed in collaboration with the Rwanda Ministry of Sports and Culture and Huye District. It comprises offices, dressing rooms and sports museum.
