= Marines F.C. (Rwanda) =

Rwandan football club

Marines
- Full name: Marines Football Club
- Ground: Umuganda Stadium; Gisenyi, Rwanda
- Capacity: 5,000
- League: Rwanda Premier League
- 2024–25: 14th

Marines Football Club is an association football club from Gisenyi, Rwanda. The team currently competes in the Rwanda National Football League, and plays its home games at the Umuganda Stadium.

They also had a basketball section, that won the National Basketball League (NBL) in 2007.
