= S.C. Kiyovu Sports =

Rwandan football club

Kiyovu Sports
- Full name: Kiyovu Sports Association
- Nickname: Urucaca
- Founded: 1964
- Ground: Mumena Stadium; Kigali, Rwanda
- Capacity: 15,000
- Chairman: David Nkurunziza
- Manager: Joslin Bipfubusa
- League: Rwanda Premier League
- 2025–26: 5th
- Website: http://www.kiyovusport.co.rw/

Kiyovu Sports Association, more commonly known as S.C. Kiyovu Sports, Kiyovu Sports or Kiyovu, is an association football club based in Kigali, Rwanda. The team currently competes in the Rwanda National Football League, and plays its home games at Mumena Stadium or Amahoro Stadium. The club's reserve team currently competes in the Rwandan Third Division. The club has won seven league titles and two national cups, and was the only Rwandan club to go a whole season unbeaten in 1990.

Kiyovu Sport Club was the first Rwanda football team to join the Football League, between 1948 and 1957. They started in the first division and were relegated only once, in 2017.

== Honours ==
- Rwanda National Football League: 7

1968, 1970, 1973, 1983, 1990, 1992, 1993

- Rwandan Cup: 2

1975, 1985

- Rwandan Super Cup: 1

2026
