= Rayon Sports F.C. =

Rwandan football club

Rayon Sports
- Full name: Rayon Sports Football Club
- Nickname: Gikundiro (The Adorable One)
- Founded: 1968
- Ground: Kigali Pelé Stadium
- Capacity: 7,000
- Manager: Haringingo Francis
- League: Rwanda Premier League
- 2025–26: RPL, 4th
- Website: www.rayonsports.rw
Home colours	Away colours

Rayon Sports Football Club is a professional football club from Nyanza, Southern province, Rwanda. It iscurrently based in Kigali. They compete in the Rwanda National Football League, and play home games at the Kigali Pele Stadium. The Amahoro Stadium is used for selected matches. For some years, its offices were located in the southern province in Nyanza District. They've won 9 league titles, 9 league cups, 2 CECAFA Kagame Cups, 9 Peace Cups, 3 Agaciro Cups, 2 Intwali Cups, 1 Kigali 100 Years' Cup and 1 Father Fraipont Memorial Tournament. The club is nicknamed Gikundiro. It boasts the largest fanbase in the country, with more than 80% of Rwandans, over 8 million people supporting Rayon Sports.

== History ==
The club was founded in May 1968 in Nyanza, but moved to the nation's capital, Kigali, in 1986, before moving back in 2012, following an agreement with the Nyanza District authorities. Gikundiro spent few months in Nyanza and returned to Kigali where it is based currently. In 2012, the club also absorbed Nyanza Football Club, which was relegated from the National Football League after the 2011–12 season.

== Honours ==
=== Domestic competitions ===
- Rwanda National Football League: 9

1975, 1981, 1997, 1998, 2002, 2004, 2012–13, 2016–17, 2018–19

- Rwandan Cup: 11

1976, 1979, 1980, 1982, 1989, 1993, 1998, 2003, 2005, 2016, 2023

- Rwandan Super Cup: 3

2017, 2019, 2023

=== International ===
- CECAFA Clubs Cup: 2

1998, 2026

== Performance in CAF competitions ==
- CAF Champions League / African Cup of Champions Clubs : 9 appearances

1982 – Preliminary Round
1998 – First Round
1999 – Second Round
2001 – Preliminary Round
2003 – First Round
2005 – Preliminary Round
2014 – Preliminary Round
2018 – First Round
2020 – Preliminary Round

- CAF Confederation Cup: 4 appearances

2006 – First Round
2008 – First Round
2017 – Second Round
2018 – Quarter-finals

- CAF Cup: 2 appearances

1993 – Preliminary Round
2002 – Quarter-finals

- CAF Cup Winners' Cup: 4 appearances

1990 – First Round
1994 – Second Round
1996 – First Round
2000 – Second Round

== Current squad ==
Note: Flags indicate national team as defined under FIFA eligibility rules; some limited exceptions apply. Players may hold more than one non-FIFA nationality.

No.	Pos.	Nation	Player
2	DF	RWA	Alexandre Bikorimana
3	DF	RWA	Obed Uwumukiza
4	MF	BDI	Akbar Muderi
5	DF	RWA	Emmanuel Nshimiyimana
6	MF	RWA	Christian Nisingizwe
7	FW	TOG	Atisso Kodjo
8	MF	NIG	Ibrahim Djingarey
10	MF	MLI	Issa Djiguiba
11	FW	CAF	Boris Gbenou
12	FW	RWA	Mubaraka Nizeyimana
13	FW	RWA	Didier Ndayishimiye
16	DF	RWA	Elie Ganijuru
18	DF	CHA	Charles Tchouplaou
19	DF	COD	Abbel Matumona

No.	Pos.	Nation	Player
20	MF	RWA	Fabio Nkudimana
21	FW	RWA	Daniel Muhoza
22	DF	RWA	Didier Nshuti
24	MF	COD	Tony Kitoga
25	FW	CMR	Junior Kameni
26	MF	COD	Gloire Tambwe
27	MF	RWA	Ami Uwimana
28	DF	RWA	Fabrice Nshimimana
29	DF	RWA	Alpha Niyonzakrera
32	GK	RWA	Yves Mugisha
33	GK	RWA	Christian Muvunyi
35	GK	CMR	Dande Junior
39	DF	RWA	Zuberi Hakizimana
40	FW	RWA	Elie Iradukunda

== Notable coaches ==
- (Rwanda) Longin Rudasingwa (1995–2000)
- (Rwanda) René Kalimunda (2007–2008)
- (Democratic Republic of the Congo) Raoul Shungu (2009)
- (Rwanda) Tierry Hitimana
- (Rwanda) Baptiste Kayiranga
- (Rwanda) Fatikaramu
- (Rwanda) Kanyankore Gilbert Youndé
- (France) Didier Gomes Da Rosa (2012–2013)
- (Rwanda) Jean Marie Ntagwabira
- (Belgium) Luc Eymael
- (France) David Donadei
- (Belgium) Ivan Minnaert (2015-2016)
- (Burkina Faso) Juma Masudi (2016–2017)
- (Rwanda) Karekezi Olivier (2017–2018)
- (Belgium) Ivan Minnaert (2018)
- (Brazil) Roberto Oliveira Goncalves do Carmo (2018–)
- (Mexico) Javier Martinez Espinosa (September 2019 – December 2019)
- (Rwanda) Casa Bungo André (December 2019 – May 2020)
- (Democratic Republic of the Congo) Guy Bukasa (May 2020 – 2022)
- (Burkina Faso) Haringingo Francis (2022–2023)
