= AS Kigali F.C. =

Rwandan football club

A.S. Kigali
- Full name: Association Sportive de Kigali
- Nickname: The Citizens (Abanyamujyi)
- Founded: 1999
- Ground: Kigali Stadium; Kigali, Rwanda
- Capacity: 22,000
- Chairman: Shema Ngoga Fabrice
- Manager: Mbungo Casa André
- League: Rwanda Premier League
- 2025–26: RPL, 14th of 16

A.S. Kigali Football Club is a Rwandan professional football club from Kigali. They play their home games at Kigali Stadium located in Nyamirambo. Established in 1999, the team plays in the Rwandan Premier League. AS Kigali has won the Rwandan Cup two times and the Rwandan Super Cup two times.

== Achievements (men) ==
- Rwandan Cup: 3
  - 2013, 2019, 2022
- Rwandan Super Cup: 2
  - 2013, 2022

== Achievements (women) ==
- Rwanda Women's Football League: 6
  - 2009, 2010, 2011, 2012, 2013, 2014
