= Police F.C. (Rwanda) =

Rwandan football club

Police FC
- Founded: 2000
- Ground: Nyamirambo Stadium; Kigali, Rwanda
- Capacity: 22,000
- League: Rwanda Premier League
- 2025–26: 6th
Home colours	Away colours

Police Football Club, also referred to as Rwandan Police, is an association football club based in Kigali, Rwanda and currently competes the Rwanda Premier League. They are the official representative team of the Rwanda National Police.

== Honours ==
- Rwandan Cup: 2
  - 2015, 2024
- Rwandan Super Cup: 1
  - 2024

== History ==
Police FC was founded 2000 by the Rwanda National Police (RNP). The club was founded as a result of officers in Rwamagana District, Eastern Province conceiving the club as a way to promote sporting outreach. They recruited local players to play for them and entered the Rwandan second division. The club won 2003 the Championnat National de 2e Division and was promoted in the Rwanda National Football League. Despite being the police representative team, the club is only supported by the Rwanda National Police and all players are civilian professionals.

In 2011 and 2012, Police FC were runners up of the Rwanda National Football League. Their first win followed 2015 with winning of the Rwandan Cup and 2016 lost in the final of the cup, In 2024, they defeated APR to win the Rwanda Heroes Cup. Police also beat them again in the final of the 2025 Rwanda Super Cup. APR and Police share a rivalry due to both clubs representing Rwanda's uniformed forces, with APR representing the Rwandan Defence Force.

Police F.C. also engage in international community outreach as seen in 2016 when they supplied medical supplies to a children's hospital in Juba, South Sudan personally. They have also played friendly matches against the Rwanda national under-20 football team.
