= APR F.C. =

Association football club in Rwanda

APR FC (Umurava - Intsinzi)
- Full name: Armée Patriotique Rwandaise Football Club
- Nickname: Intare (The Lions)
- Founded: 1 June 1993; 33 years ago
- Ground: Kigali Pelé Stadium
- Capacity: 22,000
- Chairman: Brig Gen Deo Rusanganwa
- Manager: Taleb Abderrahim
- League: Rwanda Premier League
- 2024–2025: Rwanda Premier League, 1st of 16 (champions)
- Website: www.aprfc.rw
Home colours

Armée Patriotique Rwandaise Football Club (APR FC or APR) is a professional football club from Kigali in Rwanda. The club plays their home games at Kigali Pelé Stadium. The club was founded in June 1993 as the team of the Rwandese Patriotic Front.

== History ==
Despite their short history, they become one of the most successful club in the Rwandan football league winning twenty-two Rwandan league titles and thirteen Rwandan Cups. APR FC also won the CECAFA Clubs Cup in 2004, 2007, and 2010 after ending up as losing finalists in that competition in 1996 and 2000.

In 2022, the club reached the Second Round of the CAF Champions League for the first time in club history.

== Honours ==
=== Domestic competitions ===
- Rwandan Premier League: 23

1995, 1996, 1999, 2000, 2001, 2003, 2005, 2006, 2007, 2009, 2010, 2011, 2012, 2014, 2015, 2016, 2018, 2020, 2021, 2022, 2023, 2024, 2025, 2026

- Rwandan Cup: 14

1994, 1996, 1999, 2000, 2002, 2006, 2007, 2008, 2010, 2011, 2012, 2014, 2017, 2025, 2026

- Rwandan Super Cup: 3

1994, 1996, 1999, 2000, 2002, 2006, 2007, 2008, 2010, 2011, 2012, 2014, 2017, 2025

- HEROES Cup: 2

2022, 2025.

=== International ===
- Kagame Interclub Cup: 3

2004, 2007, 2010.

== Performance in CAF competitions ==
- CAF Champions League: 18 appearances

1997 – First Round
2000 – withdrew in First Round
2002 – First Round
2004 – Third Round
2006 – First Round
2007 – First Round

2008 – Preliminary Round
2010 – First Round
2011 – Preliminary Round
2012 – First Round
2013 – Preliminary Round
2015 – First Round

2016 – First Round
2017 – Preliminary Round
2019 – Preliminary Round
2021 – Preliminary Round
2022 – Second Round
2023 – Second Round

- African Cup of Champions Clubs: 1 appearance

1996 – Second Round

- CAF Confederation Cup: 3 appearances

2004 – Intermediate Round
2005 – Second Round
2009 – First Round

- CAF Cup Winners' Cup: 1 appearance

2003 – Semi-finals

- CAF Cup: 2 appearances

1998 – First Round
1999 – First Round
