= 2021–22 Olimpia Milano season =

Italian basketball season

Olimpia Milano
2021–22 season
- Owner: Giorgio Armani
- President: Pantaleo Dell’Orco
- Head coach: Ettore Messina
- Arena: Mediolanum Forum
- LBA: Regular season
- EuroLeague: Regular season
- Supercup: Runner-up

== Kit ==
Supplier: Armani / Sponsor: Armani Exchange

== Team ==
=== Players ===
Two captains have been chosen for the 2021–22 LBA season, Melli and Rodríguez.

AX Armani Exchange Olimpia Milano roster
Players
Coaches

Pos.	No.	Nat.	Name	Ht.	Wt.	Age
SG	3	(Syria) (United States)	Kell, Trey	1.94 m (6 ft 4 in)	90 kg (198 lb)	30 – 5 April 1996
F/C	9	(Italy)	Melli, Nicolò (C)	2.05 m (6 ft 9 in)	110 kg (243 lb)	35 – 26 January 1991
G	10	(United States)	Grant, Jerian	1.96 m (6 ft 5 in)	90 kg (198 lb)	33 – 9 October 1992
PG	13	(Spain)	Rodríguez, Sergio	1.91 m (6 ft 3 in)	84 kg (185 lb)	40 – 12 June 1986
C	15	(United States)	Tarczewski, Kaleb	2.13 m (7 ft 0 in)	111 kg (245 lb)	33 – 26 February 1993
PF	17	(Italy)	Ricci, Giampaolo	2.02 m (6 ft 8 in)	100 kg (220 lb)	34 – 27 September 1991
C	19	(Italy)	Biligha, Paul	2.00 m (6 ft 7 in)	100 kg (220 lb)	36 – 31 May 1990
G/F	21	(Italy)	Moraschini, Riccardo (Suspended)	1.94 m (6 ft 4 in)	103 kg (227 lb)	35 – 8 January 1991
SG	22	(United States)	Hall, Devon	1.96 m (6 ft 5 in)	86 kg (190 lb)	31 – 7 July 1995
G	23	(United States)	Delaney, Malcolm	1.91 m (6 ft 3 in)	86 kg (190 lb)	37 – 11 March 1989
F/C	24	(Greece)	Mitoglou, Dinos (Suspended)	2.10 m (6 ft 11 in)	100 kg (220 lb)	30 – 11 June 1996
SG	25	(Italy)	Baldasso, Tommaso	1.92 m (6 ft 4 in)	80 kg (176 lb)	28 – 29 January 1998
SG	30	(United States)	Daniels, Troy	1.93 m (6 ft 4 in)	85 kg (187 lb)	35 – 15 July 1991
SF	31	(United States) (Denmark)	Shields, Shavon	2.01 m (6 ft 7 in)	100 kg (220 lb)	32 – 5 June 1994
SF	40	(Italy)	Alviti, Davide	2.00 m (6 ft 7 in)	88 kg (194 lb)	29 – 5 November 1996
C	42	(United States)	Hines, Kyle	1.98 m (6 ft 6 in)	115 kg (254 lb)	40 – 2 September 1986
PF	50	(Ghana) (United States)	Bentil, Ben	2.04 m (6 ft 8 in)	110 kg (243 lb)	31 – 29 March 1995
F	70	(Italy)	Datome, Luigi	2.03 m (6 ft 8 in)	101 kg (223 lb)	38 – 27 November 1987

Head coach

- (Italy) Ettore Messina

Assistant coach(es)

- (Italy) Mario Fioretti
- (Italy) Gianmarco Pozzecco
- (Italy) Stefano Bizzozero

Legend

- (C) Team captain
- Injured

- Roster
Updated: 4 December 2021

Note: Flags indicate national team eligibility at FIBA-sanctioned events. Players may hold other non-FIBA nationalities not displayed.

=== Depth chart ===
Pos.	Starting 5	Bench 1	Bench 2	Bench 3	Inactive
C	Kyle Hines	Kaleb Tarczewski	Paul Biligha
PF	Nicolò Melli	Ben Bentil	Giampaolo Ricci		Dinos Mitoglou (S)
SF	Shavon Shields	Luigi Datome	Davide Alviti
SG	Devon Hall	Troy Daniels	Tommaso Baldasso	Trey Kell	Riccardo Moraschini (S)
PG	Sergio Rodríguez	Malcolm Delaney	Jerian Grant

6+6 format (colours: Italian or homegrown players; foreign players; young players; injured or inactive players)

=== Squad changes ===
==== In ====
No.	Pos.	Nat.	Name	Age	Moving from		Type	Ends	Transfer fee	Date	Source
40	F	(Italy)	Davide Alviti	24	Pallacanestro Trieste	(Italy)	3 years	June 2024	50.000 €	19 June 2020	
22	SG	(United States)	Devon Hall	25	Brose Bamberg	(Germany)	2 years	June 2023	Free	20 June 2020	
24	PF	(Greece)	Dinos Mitoglou	25	Panathinaikos	(Greece)	2 years	June 2023	Free	25 June 2020	
10	G	(United States)	Jerian Grant	28	Promitheas Patras	(Greece)	2 years	June 2023	Free	1 July 2020	
17	PF	(Italy)	Giampaolo Ricci	29	Virtus Bologna	(Italy)	2 years	June 2023	Free	6 July 2021	
9	F/C	(Italy)	Nicolò Melli	30	Dallas Mavericks	(United States)	3 years	June 2024	Free	9 July 2021	
30	SG	(United States)	Troy Daniels	29	Denver Nuggets	(United States)	1 year	June 2022	Free	12 July 2021	
25	PG	(Italy)	Tommaso Baldasso	23	Fortitudo Bologna	(Italy)	2 years	June 2023	Undisclosed	22 November 2021	
50	F/C	(Ghana)	Ben Bentil	26	Bahçeşehir Koleji	(Turkey)	1 year	June 2022	Undisclosed	1 December 2021	
3	G	(United States)	Trey Kell	25	Pallacanestro Varese	(Italy)	End of the season	June 2022	Undisclosed	4 January 2022	

1. In players: Players that signed after the beginning of the season

==== Out ====
No.	Pos.	Nat.	Name	Age	Moving to		Type	Transfer fee	Date	Source
40	F/C	(United States)	Jeremy Evans	33	Panathinaikos	(Greece)	End of contract	Free	31 May 2021	
10	G/F	(Tunisia) (United States)	Michael Roll	34	Karşıyaka Basket	(Turkey)	End of contract	Free	23 June 2021	
5	SF	(Serbia)	Vladimir Micov	36	Budućnost	(Montenegro)	End of contract	Free	26 June 2021	
0	SG	(United States) (Serbia)	Kevin Punter	28	Partizan Belgrade	(Serbia)	End of contract	Free	1 July 2021	
32	PF	(Italy) (United States)	Jeff Brooks	32	Reyer Venezia	(Italy)	End of contract	Free	1 July 2021	
81	C	(Poland) (Italy)	Jakub Wojciechowski	31	Stal Ostrów Wielkopolski	(Poland)	End of contract	Free	1 July 2021	
2	F/C	(United States)	Zach LeDay	27	Partizan Belgrade	(Serbia)	Mutual consent	€150,000	6 July 2021	
20	PG	(Italy)	Andrea Cinciarini	35	Reggio Emilia	(Italy)	Transfer	Undisclosed	10 August 2021	
3	G	(Italy)	Davide Moretti	23	V.L. Pesaro	(Italy)	Loan contract	Undisclosed	14 August 2021	

==== Confirmed ====
No.	Pos.	Nat.	Name	Age	Moving from		Type	Ends	Transfer fee	Date	Source
15	C	(United States)	Kaleb Tarczewski	28	Oklahoma City Blue	(United States)	3 + 3 years	June 2023	Free	14 March 2017	
21	G/F	(Italy)	Riccardo Moraschini	30	New Basket Brindisi	(Italy)	3 years	June 2022	Free	16 July 2019	
19	C	(Italy)	Paul Biligha	31	Reyer Venezia	(Italy)	3 years	June 2022	Free	22 July 2019	
13	PG	(Spain)	Sergio Rodríguez	35	CSKA Moscow	(Russia)	3 years	June 2022	Free	30 July 2019	
23	G	(United States)	Malcolm Delaney	32	Barcelona	(Spain)	2 years	June 2022	Free	2 June 2020	
42	C	(United States)	Kyle Hines	34	CSKA Moscow	(Russia)	2 years	June 2022	Undisclosed	3 June 2020	
70	F	(Italy)	Luigi Datome	33	Fenerbahçe	(Turkey)	3 years	June 2023	Undisclosed	30 June 2020	
31	SF	(Denmark) (United States)	Shavon Shields	27	Baskonia	(Spain)	1 + 2 years	June 2023	Free	9 July 2020	

=== Coach ===
Nat.	Name	Age.	Previous team		Type	Ends	Date	Source
(Italy)	Ettore Messina	61	San Antonio Spurs (assistant)	(United States)	3 years	2022	11 June 2019	

=== On loan ===
Pos.	Nat.	Name	Age	Moving from		Moving to		Date	Contract	Ends
SG	(Italy)	Giordano Bortolani	20	Brescia Leonessa	(Italy)	Universo Treviso	(Italy)	8 July 2021	5 years	June 2025
G	(Italy)	Davide Moretti	23	Olimpia Milano	(Italy)	V.L. Pesaro	(Italy)	14 August 2021	3+2 years	June 2023 + 2025

=== Staff and management ===
Team Staff
Coaches
Ettore Messina	Head Coach
Mario Fioretti	Coach Assistant
Gianmarco Pozzecco	Coach Assistant
Marco Esposito	Coach Assistant
Stefano Bizzozero	Coach Assistant
Performance team
Giustino Danesi	Athletic trainer
Federico Conti	Athletic trainer
Francesco Cuzzolin	Athletic trainer
Alessandro Colombo	Physioterapist
Claudio Lomma	Physioterapist
Marco Monzoni	Physioterapist
Andrea Amalto	Osteopath
Medical staff
Matteo Acquati	Physician
Ezio Giani	Physician
Michele Ronchi	Physician
Daniele Casalini	Physician
Fabrizio Spataro	Nutritionist
Giulia Baroncini	Nutritionist

Management
Pantaleo Dell'Orco	President of Board of Directors
Ettore Messina	President of Basketball Operations
Christos Stavropoulos	General Manager
Team Management
Alberto Rossini	Head of team management
Filippo Leoni	Team manager
Andrea Colombo	Assistant team manager
Alessandro Barenghi	Equipment manager
Gianluca Solani	Referee officer

== Pre-season: Paris European Games ==
11 September 2021 Game 1	Paris Basketball (France)	64–95	(Italy) AX Armani Exchange Milan	Paris
16:30 (CET)	Scoring by quarter: 14-23, 19-25, 16-27, 15-20
Facebook	Pts: Barbitch 15	Boxscore	Pts: Daniels 19	Arena: Halle Georges Carpentier

12 September 2021 Game 2	ASVEL Basket (France)	76–63	(Italy) AX Armani Exchange Milan	Paris
16:30 (CET)	Scoring by quarter: 19-18, 21-12, 22-23, 14-10
Facebook	Pts: Okobo 18	Boxscore	Pts: Delaney 15	Arena: Halle Georges Carpentier

== Competitions ==
=== Overview ===
Competition	First match	Last match	Starting round	Final position	Record							
Competition	First match	Last match	Starting round	Final position	Pld	W	D	L	PF	PA	PD	Win %
Supercup	18 September 2021	21 September 2021	Quarterfinals	Runner-up	3	2	0	1	264	217	+47	66.67
Serie A	25 September 2021	5 January 2022	Regular season	Regular season	13	12	1	0	1,093	907	+186	92.31
EuroLeague	30 September 2021	16 December 2021	Regular season	Regular season	16	10	0	6	1,200	1,150	+50	62.50
Total					32	24	1	7	2,557	2,274	+283	75.00

Source: Competitions

=== Supercup ===
18 September 2021 Quarterfinals	AX Armani Exchange Milano	108–60	NutriBullet Treviso Basket	Casalecchio di Reno (Bologna)
18:00 (CET)	Scoring by quarter: 36-20, 33-14, 17-13, 22-13
Discovery+, Eurosport, DMAX	Pts: Alviti 18; Rebs: Mitoglou 11; Asts: Delaney 4 PIR: Mitoglou 31	Boxscore	Pts: Bortolani 16; Rebs: Poser 5 Asts: Jones 3 PIR: Bortolani 10	Arena: Unipol Arena; Referees: Tolga Sahin, Guido Giovannetti, Fabrizio Paglialunga

20 September 2021 Semifinals	Happy Casa Brindisi	67–72	AX Armani Exchange Milano	Casalecchio di Reno (Bologna)
18:00 (CET)	Scoring by quarter: 15-21, 12-20, 29-10, 11-21
Discovery+, Eurosport, DMAX	Pts: J.Perkins, N.Perkins 16; Rebs: J.Perkins, N.Perkins 7 Asts: J.Perkins 4 PIR: N.Perkins 17	Boxscore	Pts: Mitoglou 11; Rebs: Hines 8 Asts: Rodríguez, Shields 3 PIR: Hines 23	Arena: Unipol Arena; Referees: Tolga Sahin, Guido Giovannetti, Fabrizio Paglialunga

21 September 2021 Final	AX Armani Exchange Milano	84–90	Virtus Segafredo Bologna	Casalecchio di Reno (Bologna)
21:00 (CET)	Scoring by quarter: 20-23, 15-21, 20-23, 29-23
Discovery+, Eurosport, DMAX	Pts: Shields 19; Rebs: Melli 10; Asts: Rodríguez, Delaney 5 PIR: Hall 23	Boxscore	Pts: Jaiteh 18; Rebs: Jaiteh 9 Asts: Pajola 7 PIR: Pajola 27	Arena: Unipol Arena; Referees: Saverio Lanzarini, Michele Rossi, Guido Giovannetti

=== Serie A Regular Season ===
==== League table ====
Pos	Team	Pld	W	L	PF	PA	PD	Pts	Qualification
1	Virtus Segafredo Bologna	30	26	4	2666	2364	+302	52	Qualification to Playoffs
2	AX Armani Exchange Milano	30	24	6	2465	2155	+310	48	Qualification to Playoffs
3	Germani Basket Brescia	30	21	9	2524	2310	+214	42	Qualification to Playoffs
4	Bertram Derthona Basket	30	17	13	2418	2412	+6	34	Qualification to Playoffs
5	Umana Reyer Venezia	30	17	13	2331	2297	+34	34	Qualification to Playoffs

Source: LBA

==== Results summary ====
Overall						Home					Away				
Pld	W	L	PF	PA	PD	W	L	PF	PA	PD	W	L	PF	PA	PD
13	12	1	1093	907	+186	7	0	612	480	+132	5	1	481	427	+54

Source: Competitive matches

==== Results by round ====
Round	1	2	3	4	5	6	7	8	9	10	11	12	13
Ground	A	H	A	H	A	H	A	H	H	A	H	A	H
Result	W	W	W	W	W	W	W	W	W	W	W	L	W
Position	4	2	2	2	1	1	1	1	1	1	1	1	1

Source: Competitive matches
A = Away; H = Home; W = Win; L = Loss; V = Void

==== Matches ====
25 September 2021 1	GeVi Napoli	63–73	AX Armani Exchange Milano	Naples
20:00 (CET)	Scoring by quarter: 18-21, 13-21, 13-18, 19-13
Discovery+, Eurosport	Pts: Parks 17; Rebs: Parks 9 Asts: Velička 4 PIR: Parks 20	Boxscore	Pts: Shields, Datome 13; Rebs: Mitoglou 10; Asts: Delaney 7 PIR: Mitoglou 17	Arena: PalaBarbuto; Referees: Guido Federico Di Francesco, Tolga Sahin, Fabio Catani

3 October 2021 2	AX Armani Exchange Milano	93–72	Dolomiti Energia Trentino	Assago (Milan)
17:30 (CET)	Scoring by quarter: 28-21, 19-11, 19-19, 27-21
Discovery+, Eurosport	Pts: Shields 19; Rebs: Moraschini 7 Asts: Grant 4 PIR: Shields 19	Boxscore	Pts: Reynolds 15; Rebs: Saunders, Saunders 10; Asts: Bradford, Saunders 7 PIR: Mezzanotte 11	Arena: Mediolanum Forum; Referees: Lorenzo Baldini, Alessandro Nicolini, Federico Brindisi

10 October 2021 3	Openjobmetis Varese	79–82	AX Armani Exchange Milano	Varese
17:00 (CET)	Scoring by quarter: 19-21, 21-19, 24-20, 15-22
Discovery+, Eurosport	Pts: Gentile 25; Rebs: Egbunu 14; Asts: Kell, De Nicolao 4 PIR: Gentile 20	Boxscore	Pts: Hall 16; Rebs: Melli 9 Asts: Rodríguez 7 PIR: Melli 28	Arena: Enerxenia Arena; Referees: Saverio Lanzarini, Beniamino Manuel Attard, Martino Galasso

17 October 2021 4	AX Armani Exchange Milano	93–68	Umana Reyer Venezia	Assago (Milan)
20:45 (CET)	Scoring by quarter: 20-10, 26-15, 27-20, 20-23
Discovery+, Rai Sport	Pts: Mitoglou 18; Rebs: Mitoglou 7 Asts: Rodríguez 7 PIR: Mitoglou 26	Boxscore	Pts: Sanders 14; Rebs: Watt 5 Asts: De Nicolao 7 PIR: Daye 12	Arena: Mediolanum Forum; Referees: Roberto Begnis, Valerio Grigioni, Sergio Noce

23 October 2021 5	Fortitudo Kigili Bologna	75–86	AX Armani Exchange Milano	PalaDozza
18:00 (CET)	Scoring by quarter: 16-17, 19-22, 15-17, 25-30
Discovery+, Eurosport	Pts: Aradori 18; Rebs: Ashley 5 Asts: Durham 10; PIR: Procida 17	Boxscore	Pts: Rodríguez 16; Rebs: Shields 8 Asts: Rodríguez 8 PIR: Rodríguez, Shields 18	Arena: PalaDozza; Referees: Carmelo Lo Guzzo, Christian Borgo, Alessandro Perciavalle

31 October 2021 6	AX Armani Exchange Milano	79–50	Banco di Sardegna Sassari	Assago (Milan)
17:00 (CET)	Scoring by quarter: 22-15, 20-15, 18-6, 19-14
Discovery+	Pts: Mitoglou, Daniels 16; Rebs: Mitoglou 13; Asts: Rodríguez 7 PIR: Mitoglou 30	Boxscore	Pts: Logan, Burnell, Bendžius 10; Rebs: Bendžius 8 Asts: Logan 5 PIR: Bendžius 15	Arena: Mediolanum Forum; Referees: Saverio Lanzarini, Denny Borgioni, Edoardo Gonella

7 November 2021 7	Vanoli Basket Cremona	86–93	AX Armani Exchange Milano	Cremona
17:30 (CET)	Scoring by quarter: 20-24, 25-21, 12-28, 29-20
Discovery+, Eurosport 1	Pts: Harris 21; Rebs: McNeace, Pecchia 6 Asts: Poeta 7 PIR: Miller 16	Boxscore	Pts: Melli 20; Rebs: Rodríguez 6 Asts: Rodríguez 7 PIR: Melli 25	Arena: PalaRadi; Referees: Alessandro Martolini, Fabrizio Paglialunga, Marco Vita

14 November 2021 8	AX Armani Exchange Milano	84–74	UNAHOTELS Reggio Emilia	Assago (Milan)
18:30 (CET)	Scoring by quarter: 17-24, 32-21, 18-18, 17-11
Discovery+	Pts: Rodríguez 22; Rebs: Hines 9 Asts: Melli 4 PIR: Rodríguez 22	Boxscore	Pts: Hopkins 21; Rebs: Hopkins 12; Asts: Crawford, Cinciarini 7 PIR: Hopkins 25	Arena: Mediolanum Forum; Referees: Tolga Ozge Sahin, Alessandro Vicino, Martino Galasso

21 November 2021 9	AX Armani Exchange Milano	85–55	NutriBullet Treviso	Assago (Milan)
17:30 (CET)	Scoring by quarter: 24-12, 19-13, 21-17, 21-13
Discovery+, Eurosport 2	Pts: Shields 15; Rebs: Ricci 8 Asts: Grant 5 PIR: Ricci 21	Boxscore	Pts: Sims 16; Rebs: Sims 11; Asts: Russell 3 PIR: Sims 26	Arena: Mediolanum Forum; Referees: Carmelo Paternicò, Denis Quarta, Silvia Marziali

5 December 2021 10	Happy Casa Brindisi	53–79	AX Armani Exchange Milano	Brindisi
17:00 (CET)	Scoring by quarter: 21-9, 6-18, 13-22, 13-30
Discovery+	Pts: Chappell 13; Rebs: Gaspardo, Chappell 5 Asts: Perkins 4 PIR: Chappell 16	Boxscore	Pts: Hall 16; Rebs: Bentil 7 Asts: Delaney 3 PIR: Hall 20	Arena: PalaPentassuglia; Referees: Manuel Mazzoni, Beniamino Manuel Attard, Giacomo Dori

12 December 2021 11	AX Armani Exchange Milano	76–62	Germani Basket Brescia	Assago (Milan)
17:30 (CET)	Scoring by quarter: 15-12, 17-20, 20-17, 24-13
Eurosport 2, Discovery+	Pts: Ricci, Bentil 14; Rebs: Melli 14; Asts: Delaney 4 PIR: Ricci 19	Boxscore	Pts: Della Valle 17; Rebs: Cobbins 5 Asts: Mitrou-Long 2 PIR: Della Valle 17	Arena: Mediolanum Forum; Referees: Michele Rossi, Andrea Bongiorni, Giulio Pepponi

19 December 2021 12	Allianz Pallacanestro Trieste	71–68	AX Armani Exchange Milano	Trieste
12:00 (CET)	Scoring by quarter: 16-14, 22-24, 15-21, 18-9
Discovery+	Pts: Banks 19; Rebs: Mian, Delía 7 Asts: Davis 5 PIR: Banks 23	Boxscore	Pts: Daniels 16; Rebs: Melli, Alviti 8 Asts: Hall 8 PIR: Bentil 18	Arena: Allianz Dome; Referees: Tolga Ozge Sahin, Guido Giovannetti, Valerio Grigioni

5 January 2022 13	AX Armani Exchange Milano	102–99(OT)	Virtus Segafredo Bologna	Assago (Milan)
16:00 (CET)	Scoring by quarter: 24-21, 30-24, 21-20, 20-30, Overtime: 7-4
Rai 2, Discovery+	Pts: Grant 20; Rebs: Melli, Hines, Bentil 5 Asts: Rodríguez 9 PIR: Grant 27	Boxscore	Pts: Belinelli 34; Rebs: Jaiteh 10; Asts: Teodosić 10; PIR: Belinelli 33	Arena: Mediolanum Forum; Referees: Roberto Begnis, Lorenzo Baldini, Alessandro Perciavalle

=== EuroLeague Regular Season ===
==== League table ====
Pos	Team	Pld	W	L	PF	PA	PD	Qualification
1	(Spanish Basketball Federation) Barcelona	28	21	7	2275	2101	+174	Qualification to playoffs
2	(Hellenic Basketball Federation) Olympiacos	28	19	9	2222	2045	+177	Qualification to playoffs
3	(Italian Basketball Federation) A|X Armani Exchange Milan	28	19	9	2069	1992	+77	Qualification to playoffs
4	(Spanish Basketball Federation) Real Madrid	28	18	10	2181	2079	+102	Qualification to playoffs
5	(Israeli Basketball Association) Maccabi Tel Aviv	28	17	11	2272	2209	+63	Qualification to playoffs

Source: EuroLeague
Rules for classification: All points scored in extra period(s) were not counted in the standings, nor for any tie-break situation.

==== Results summary ====
Overall						Home					Away				
Pld	W	L	PF	PA	PD	W	L	PF	PA	PD	W	L	PF	PA	PD
16	10	6	1200	1150	+50	7	2	689	643	+46	3	4	511	507	+4

Source: Competitive matches

==== Results by round ====
Round	1	2	3	4	5	6	7	8	9	10	11	12	13	14	15	16
Ground	H	A	H	H	H	A	H	H	A	A	A	H	A	A	H	H
Result	W	W	W	W	W	L	W	W	W	L	L	L	L	W	W	L
Position	6	3	2	2	2	3	1	1	1	3	3	4	4	4	4	5

Source: Competitive matches
A = Away; H = Home; W = Win; L = Loss; P = Postponed

==== Matches ====
30 September 2021 1	AX Armani Exchange Milano (Italy)	84–74	(Russia) CSKA Moscow	Assago (Milan)
20:30 (CET)	Scoring by quarter: 21-29, 23-16, 18-14, 22-25
EuroLeague TV, Sky Sport Arena, MATCH!STRANA	Pts: Rodríguez, Shields 17; Rebs: Shields 7 Asts: Shields 5 PIR: Melli 19	Boxscore	Pts: Lundberg 13; Rebs: Lundberg, Voigtmann 7 Asts: Lundberg 6 PIR: Lundberg 23	Arena: Mediolanum Forum; Referees: Miguel Ángel Pérez Pérez, Damir Javor, Mehdi Difallah

8 October 2021 2	Baskonia Vitoria-Gasteiz (Spain)	64–78	(Italy) AX Armani Exchange Milano	Vitoria-Gasteiz
20:30 (CET)	Scoring by quarter: 17-19, 13-19, 17-19, 17-21
EuroLeague TV, Sky Sport Uno, DAZN	Pts: Fontecchio 16; Rebs: Fontecchio, Enoch, Nnoko 6 Asts: Baldwin 4 PIR: Giedraitis 20	Boxscore	Pts: Delaney 13; Rebs: Shields 10; Asts: Rodríguez 6 PIR: Melli 16	Arena: Fernando Buesa Arena; Referees: Robert Lottermoser, Mario Majkić, Luka Kardum

12 October 2021 3	AX Armani Exchange Milano (Italy)	83–72	(Israel) Maccabi Tel Aviv	Assago (Milan)
20:30 (CET)	Scoring by quarter: 26-15, 26-15, 11-19, 20-23
EuroLeague TV, Sky Sport Arena, 5SPORT	Pts: Hall 17; Rebs: Mitoglou 6 Asts: Rodríguez 5 PIR: Mitoglou 20	Boxscore	Pts: Williams 19; Rebs: Nunnally 7 Asts: Nunnally 5 PIR: Nunnally 20	Arena: Mediolanum Forum; Referees: Saša Pukl, Emilio Pérez Pizarro, Tomislav Hordov

15 October 2021 4	AX Armani Exchange Milano (Italy)	75–71	(Turkey) Anadolu Efes Istanbul	Assago (Milan)
20:30 (CET)	Scoring by quarter: 16-21, 26-15, 21-13, 12-22
EuroLeague TV, Sky Sport Arena, BeIN Sports	Pts: Delaney 16; Rebs: Mitoglou 7 Asts: Mitoglou 5 PIR: Mitoglou, Hines 20	Boxscore	Pts: Micić 17; Rebs: Larkin 9 Asts: Micić 5 PIR: Larkin 20	Arena: Mediolanum Forum; Referees: Borys Ryzhyk, Ilija Belošević, Leandro Leczano

21 October 2021 5	AX Armani Exchange Milano (Italy)	73–72	(France) LDLC ASVEL Villeurbanne	Assago (Milan)
20:30 (CET)	Scoring by quarter: 14-17, 12-23, 25-11, 22-21
EuroLeague TV, Eleven Sports	Pts: Shields 15; Rebs: Hines 8 Asts: Shields 5 PIR: Melli 18	Boxscore	Pts: Okobo 25; Rebs: Kahudi 6 Asts: Okobo 3 PIR: Okobo 19	Arena: Mediolanum Forum; Referees: Benjamín Jiménez, Uroš Nikolić, Sašo Petek

26 October 2021 6	Bayern Munich (Germany)	83–77	(Italy) AX Armani Exchange Milano	Munich
20:45 (CET)	Scoring by quarter: 21-24, 18-15, 20-15, 24-23
EuroLeague TV, Eleven Sports, Magenta Sport	Pts: Lučić 20; Rebs: Hunter 10; Asts: Walden, Lučić 3 PIR: Hunter 20	Boxscore	Pts: Melli 16; Rebs: Melli, Mitoglou 8 Asts: Hall 6 PIR: Mitoglou 8	Arena: Audi Dome; Referees: Sreten Radović, Juan Carlos García González, Saulius Račys

28 October 2021 7	AX Armani Exchange Milano (Italy)	79–62	(Serbia) Crvena zvezda	Assago (Milan)
20:30 (CET)	Scoring by quarter: 24-6, 19-21, 19-23, 17-12
EuroLeague TV, Eleven Sports, Sport Klub	Pts: Shields 18; Rebs: Hines 9 Asts: Rodríguez 8 PIR: Shields 16	Boxscore	Pts: Mitrović 17; Rebs: Mitrović 7 Asts: Wolters, Uskoković 5 PIR: Mitrović 27	Arena: Mediolanum Forum; Referees: Damir Javor, Mehdi Difallah, Vasileios Pitsilkas

4 November 2021 8	AX Armani Exchange Milano (Italy)	75–70	(Spain) Barcelona	Assago (Milan)
20:30 (CET)	Scoring by quarter: 28-21, 19-13, 19-15, 14-21
EuroLeague TV, Sky Sport Arena, DAZN	Pts: Datome 17; Rebs: Melli 8 Asts: Shields 5 PIR: Datome 16	Boxscore	Pts: Davies 12; Rebs: Calathes 7 Asts: Calathes 5 PIR: Davies, Calathes 14	Arena: Mediolanum Forum; Referees: Ilija Belošević, Milan Nedović, Tomasz Trawicki

12 November 2021 9	Fenerbahçe Beko (Turkey)	43–68	(Italy) AX Armani Exchange Milano	Istanbul
18:45 (CET)	Scoring by quarter: 3-22, 17-15, 9-25, 14-6
EuroLeague TV, Eleven Sports, Sky Sport, beIN Sports	Pts: Henry 12; Rebs: Düverioğlu 8 Asts: De Colo, Pierre 3 PIR: Veselý 21	Boxscore	Pts: Shields 13; Rebs: Melli, Mitoglou, Hines 6 Asts: Rodríguez 7 PIR: Melli, Shields 17	Arena: Ülker Sports and Event Hall; Referees: Saša Pukl, Fernando Rocha, Jakub Zamojski

17 November 2021 10	UNICS Kazan (Russia)	97–71	(Italy) AX Armani Exchange Milano	Kazan
18:00 (CET)	Scoring by quarter: 19-17, 25-16, 27-16, 26-22
EuroLeague TV, Sky Sport Arena, Match! Igra	Pts: Canaan 22; Rebs: Jekiri 7 Asts: Spissu 6 PIR: Brown 27	Boxscore	Pts: Melli, Shields, Datome 10; Rebs: Melli 3 Asts: Rodríguez, Ricci 3 PIR: Melli 18	Arena: Basket-Hall Kazan; Referees: Borys Ryzhyk, Milivoje Jovčić, Miloš Koljenšić

19 November 2021 11	Zenit Saint Petersburg (Russia)	74–70	(Italy) AX Armani Exchange Milano	Saint Petersburg
18:45 (CET)	Scoring by quarter: 19-19, 16-20, 25-21, 14-10
EuroLeague TV, Sky Sport Arena, Match! Strana	Pts: Mickey 17; Rebs: Ponitka 9 Asts: Loyd 7 PIR: Gudaitis 19	Boxscore	Pts: Rodríguez 20; Rebs: Hines 8 Asts: Rodríguez 6 PIR: Rodríguez 22	Arena: Sibur Arena; Referees: Robert Lottermoser, Juan Carlos García González, Robert Vyklický

26 November 2021 12	AX Armani Exchange Milano (Italy)	72–93	(Greece) Olympiacos Piraeus	Assago (Milan)
20:30 (CET)	Scoring by quarter: 25-30, 20-30, 12-12, 15-21
EuroLeague TV, Eleven Sports, Nova Sports	Pts: Shields 26; Rebs: Melli 6 Asts: Rodríguez, Shields 5 PIR: Shields 28	Boxscore	Pts: Larentzakis 18; Rebs: Vezenkov, Jean-Charles 5 Asts: Dorsey, Sloukas 4 PIR: Sloukas 15	Arena: Mediolanum Forum; Referees: Ilija Belošević, Damir Javor, Tomasz Trawicki

3 December 2021 13	Alba Berlin (Germany)	81–76	(Italy) AX Armani Exchange Milano	Berlin
20:00 (CET)	Scoring by quarter: 19-15, 24-18, 24-23, 14-20
EuroLeague TV, Sky Sport Arena, Magenta Sport	Pts: Eriksson 21; Rebs: Olinde 8 Asts: Sikma 7 PIR: Eriksson 24	Boxscore	Pts: Delaney 12; Rebs: Melli 7 Asts: Rodríguez 6 PIR: Rodríguez, Shields 22	Arena: Mercedes-Benz Arena; Referees: Saša Pukl, Fernando Rocha, Amit Balak

10 December 2021 14	AS Monaco (France)	65–71	(Italy) AX Armani Exchange Milano	Monaco
20:00 (CET)	Scoring by quarter: 14-26, 13-13, 17-18, 21-14
EuroLeague TV, Eleven Sports	Pts: Lee 19; Rebs: Motiejūnas 9 Asts: Lee 6 PIR: Lee 26	Boxscore	Pts: Rodríguez 13; Rebs: Rodríguez, Shields, Hines 6 Asts: Rodríguez 4 PIR: Hines 20	Arena: Salle Gaston Médecin; Referees: Borys Ryzhyk, Oļegs Latiševs, Aare Halliko

14 December 2021 15	AX Armani Exchange Milano (Italy)	75–54	(Greece) Panathinaikos OPAP	Assago (Milan)
20:30 (CET)	Scoring by quarter: 15-19, 18-10, 24-13, 18-12
EuroLeague TV	Pts: Hall 19; Rebs: Ricci, Delaney 6 Asts: Rodríguez 9 PIR: Hall 19	Boxscore	Pts: Macon 14; Rebs: Papagiannis 7 Asts: Sant-Roos 3 PIR: White 10	Arena: Mediolanum Forum; Referees: Sreten Radović, Juan Carlos García, Saulius Račys

16 December 2021 16	AX Armani Exchange Milano (Italy)	75–75	(Spain) Real Madrid	Assago (Milan)
20:30 (CET)	Scoring by quarter: 19-18, 8-17, 21-20, 25-20
EuroLeague TV	Pts: Shields 18; Rebs: Melli, Hines 9 Asts: Rodríguez 5 PIR: Shields 19	Boxscore	Pts: Causeur 17; Rebs: Tavares 8 Asts: Llull 5 PIR: Yabusele 22	Arena: Mediolanum Forum; Referees: Ilija Belošević, Elias Koromilas, Tomasz Trawicki

== Statistics ==
As of 19 December 2021.

=== Individual game highs ===
	Total	Player	Opponent
Points	26	Shavon Shields	vs (Greece) Olympiacos (26 Nov.)
Total Rebounds	14	Nicolò Melli	vs (Italy) Brescia (12 Dec.)
Assists	9	Sergio Rodríguez	vs (Greece) Panathinaikos (14 Dec.)
Assists	9	Sergio Rodríguez	vs (Italy) V.Bologna^{OT} (5 Jan.)
Blocks	3	Nicolò Melli	@ (Italy) Varese (10 Oct.)
Blocks	3	Kyle Hines	vs (Greece) Olympiacos (26 Nov.)
Steals	6	Nicolò Melli	@ (Turkey) Fenerbahçe (12 Nov.)
Efficiency	31	Dinos Mitoglou	vs (Italy) Treviso (19 Sept.)
2-point field goal percentage^{5}	100% (6/6)	Dinos Mitoglou	vs (Italy) Venezia (17 Oct.)
3-point field goal percentage	100% (4/4)	Troy Daniels	vs (Italy) R.Emilia (14 Nov.)
Free throw percentage	100% (8/8)	Sergio Rodríguez	vs (Italy) R.Emilia (14 Nov.)
Turnovers	5	Sergio Rodríguez	@ (Turkey) Fenerbahçe (12 Nov.)
Minutes	37	Jerian Grant	vs (Italy) V.Bologna^{OT} (5 Jan.)

Notes

- ^5 at least 5 attempts
- ^OT match ended in overtime

	Total	Player	Opponent
2-point field goals made	7	Dinos Mitoglou	vs (Italy) Sassari (31 Oct.)
2-point field goals made	7	Kyle Hines	vs (Italy) V.Bologna^{OT} (5 Jan.)
2-point field goals attempted	13	Shavon Shields	vs (Greece) Olympiacos (26 Nov.)
3-point field goals made	5	Sergio Rodríguez	vs (Italy) Cremona (7 Nov.)
3-point field goals attempted	11	Troy Daniels	@ (Italy) Trieste (19 Dec.)
Free throws made	8	Nicolò Melli	vs (Russia) CSKA (30 Sept.)
Free throws attempted	11	Nicolò Melli	vs (Russia) CSKA (30 Sept.)
Offensive Rebounds	6	Nicolò Melli	vs (Italy) Brescia (12 Dec.)
Offensive Rebounds	6	Kyle Hines	vs (Spain) Real Madrid (16 Dec.)
Defensive Rebounds	10	Dinos Mitoglou	vs (Italy) Sassari (31 Oct.)

=== Team game highs ===
Statistic	Total	Opponent
Points	108	vs (Italy) Treviso (19 Sept.)
Total Rebounds	49	vs (Italy) Sassari (31 Oct.)
Assists	29	vs (Italy) V.Bologna^{OT} (5 Jan.)
Blocks	7	vs (Italy) Treviso (19 Sept.)
Steals	12	vs (Italy) Sassari (31 Oct.)
Efficiency	162	vs (Italy) Treviso (19 Sept.)
2-point field goal percentage	73.5% (25/34)	@ (Germany) B.Munich (26 Oct.)
3-point field goal percentage	56.5% (13/23)	vs (Italy) Venezia (17 Oct.)
Free throw percentage	100% (17/17)	@ (Italy) Varese (10 Oct.)
Turnovers	4	@ (Italy) Varese (10 Oct.)

Notes

- ^OT match ended in overtime

Statistic	Total	Opponent
2-point field goals made	28	vs (Italy) Treviso (19 Sept.)
2-point field goals attempted	46	vs (Italy) V.Bologna^{OT} (5 Jan.)
3-point field goals made	15	vs (Italy) V.Bologna^{OT} (5 Jan.)
3-point field goals attempted	34	vs (Italy) V.Bologna^{OT} (5 Jan.)
Free throws made	22	vs (Italy) R.Emilia (14 Nov.)
Free throws attempted	25	@ (Germany) B.Munich (26 Oct.) vs (Italy) R.Emilia (14 Nov.)
Offensive Rebounds	17	@ (Italy) Napoli (25 Sept.) @ (Spain) Baskonia (8 Oct.)
Defensive Rebounds	35	vs (Italy) Sassari (31 Oct.)
