= Sanogo =

Sanogo is a surname.

It may refer to:

- Abou Sanogo (born 1994), Ivorian cyclist
- Adama Sanogo (born 2002), Malian basketball player
- Ali Sanogo (born 1998), Ivorian footballer
- Amadou Sanogo (born 1972 or 1973), Malian military officer
- Barou Sanogo (born 1995), Malian footballer
- Boubacar Sanogo (born 1982), Ivorian footballer
- Emmanuel Sanogo (born 1997), Malian footballer
- Ismael Sanogo (born 1996), Ivorian basketball player
- Issa Sanogo (born 1971), Burkinabé footballer
- Malick Sanogo (born 2004), American soccer player
- Mohammed Sanogo (born 1974), Ivorian pastor, author and missionary
- Moussa Sanogo (born 1983), Ivorian footballer
- Sekou Sanogo (1921–1962), Ivorian politician
- Sekou Sanogo Junior (born 1989), Ivorian footballer
- Siriki Sanogo (born 2001), Ivorian footballer
- Vamara Sanogo (born 1995), French footballer
- Yaya Sanogo (born 1993), French footballer
- Zakaria Sanogo (born 1996), Burkinabé footballer
