= National Association of Charismatic and Christian Churches =

Church association in Ghana

- Founded at: Accra, Ghana
- Purpose: Supervision of Charismatic churches
- Region served: Ghana
- Official language: English
- Website: naccc.org.gh

The National Association of Charismatic and Christian Churches (NACCC) is an association of charismatic Christian churches in Ghana.

== Origin ==
The NACCC plays a supervisory role to ensure that ministers maintain high moral standards. Protestant churches in Ghana belonged to The Christian Council of Ghana or The Ghana Pentecostal and Charismatic Council (GPCC) until the NACCC was founded. The NACCC was founded on 1 December 1999 by Dag Heward-Mills who was also elected twice as Chairman. It had existed informally before that date. The word "Christian" was included in the name to show that the organization was open to churches that shared its vision even if they did not consider themselves charismatic. The NACCC defined one of its objectives as fostering close cooperation between its members and with other umbrella church organizations including the CCG, GPCC and the Council of Charismatic Churches. The NACCC is also related and cooperating with other regional West-African networks and ministries like David Oyedepo in Nigeria or Mohammed Sanogo in Ivory Coast.

== History ==
The NACCC and the GPCC came to play an important role in the transmission of gospel teaching in Ghana. The older classical Pentecostals belong to the GPCC, while the younger, independent Charismatic ministries are NACCC members. The majority of charismatic churches now belong to the NACCC, but some are associated with the GPCC including the Perez Chapel International, Royal House Chapel International, Full Gospel Church International and the Christian Action Faith Ministry. By May 2006 the NACCC had registered 119 member churches, each of whom agreed with the query, "Would you be faithful to ministry by upholding the highest standards of ministerial ethics, moral and financial rectitude, self-sacrifice, living a godly life and cherishing the call of God on your life?" Most of the members are Neo-Pentecostal.

In August 2003 Steve Mensah of Christian Evangelistic Ministry (CEM) was elected Chairman of the NACCC for a two-year term at the end of its four-day annual conference, replacing Dag Heward-Mills of Lighthouse Cathedral. As of 2015 Archbishop Nicholas Duncan-Williams was chairman of the NACCC.

Since 2004 the NACCC has organized all Christians all night prayer vigils.

== Members ==
As of 2024 the NACCC board members included representatives of the following churches or organizations:

- Action Chapel International
- Alabaster House Chapel
- Believers On Fire Int. Ministries
- Breakthrough Family Ministries International
- Breakthrough Prayer Chapel
- Charismatic Evangelistic Ministry (CEM)
- Charity House Chapel
- Christ Foundation Family Church
- Christ Home of Fellowship Ministry
- Christ Oil Fields Authority Church
- Compelling Power Chapel
- Covenant Family Community Chapel
- Cross Over Chapel
- Eternal Love Ministry (EWC)
- Faith Alive Chapel International
- Faith Missionary Church
- Family Chapel International
- Fruitfull Hill Chapel
- Global Revival Ministry
- Golden Street Chapel
- Gospel Light Int. Church
- Grace Gospel Church
- Grace Outreach Church
- Great Vision Ministry International
- Hall Of Strength Ministry
- Hallowed Temple International Church
- Harvest Chapel International
- Holy Fire Revival Ministry International
- International Charismatic Church
- International Full Bible Church
- International Revival Bible Church
- Kingdom Gate Chapel (Worldwide)
- Latter Rain Family Chapel International
- Liberation Bible Church
- Light of Life Gospel Mission
- Lighthouse Chapel International
- Living Grace Ministries
- Positive Faith International Ministry
- Power House Chapel
- Revival Flames Evangelistic Missions
- Sheepfold Chapel
- Solid Rock Chapel
- Greater Missions of God
- Springs of Life Chapel International.
- Triumph Bible Church International
- Triumphant Global Ministry
- World Missionary Church International (COCEM)
- World Outreach Gospel Mission
