= 2021–22 Vanoli Cremona season =

Italian basketball season

Vanoli Cremona
2021-22 season
- Owner: Guerino Vanoli Basket srl
- President: Aldo Vanoli
- Head coach: Paolo Galbiati
- Arena: Palasport Mario Radi
- LBA: Regular season
- Supercup: Group stage (2nd of 3)

The 2020–21 season is Vanoli Cremona's 23rd in existence and the club's 11th consecutive season in the top tier Italian basketball.

== Kit ==
Supplier: Errea / Sponsor: Vanoli

=== Current roster ===
Vanoli Basket Cremona roster
Players
Coaches

Pos.	No.	Nat.	Name	Ht.	Wt.	Age
F/C	0	(Nigeria)	Agbamu, Destiny	2.03 m (6 ft 8 in)	92 kg (203 lb)	23 – 2 June 2003
C	1	(Senegal)	Dime, Malik	2.06 m (6 ft 9 in)	100 kg (220 lb)	33 – 6 October 1992
PF	3	(Ivory Coast)	Sanogo, Ismael	2.03 m (6 ft 8 in)	95 kg (209 lb)	30 – 16 July 1996
C	4	(United States)	McNeace, Jamuni	2.08 m (6 ft 10 in)	101 kg (223 lb)	30 – 25 March 1996
G/F	6	(Italy)	Pecchia, Andrea	1.97 m (6 ft 6 in)	90 kg (198 lb)	28 – 16 November 1997
PG	8	(Italy)	Poeta, Giuseppe (C)	1.90 m (6 ft 3 in)	82 kg (181 lb)	41 – 12 September 1985
SG	9	(Italy)	Spagnolo, Matteo	1.94 m (6 ft 4 in)	88 kg (194 lb)	23 – 10 January 2003
PF	12	(Latvia)	Kohs, Verners	2.06 m (6 ft 9 in)	94 kg (207 lb)	27 – 21 May 1999
F	13	(United States)	Tinkle, Tres	2.03 m (6 ft 8 in)	102 kg (225 lb)	30 – 3 June 1996
G	25	(Italy)	Cournooh, David	1.87 m (6 ft 2 in)	88 kg (194 lb)	36 – 28 July 1990
G	33	(Lithuania)	Juškevičius, Adas	1.94 m (6 ft 4 in)	90 kg (198 lb)	37 – 3 January 1989

Head coach

- (Italy) Paolo Galbiati

Assistant coach(es)

- (Italy) Pierluigi Brotto
- (Italy) Federico Perego
- (Italy) Roberto Spoto

Legend

- (C) Team captain
- Injured

- Roster
Updated: 16 March 2022

Note: Flags indicate national team eligibility at FIBA-sanctioned events. Players may hold other non-FIBA nationalities not displayed.

=== Depth chart ===
Pos.	Starting 5	Bench 1	Bench 2
C	Jamuni McNeace	Malik Dime	Destiny Agbamu
PF	Ismael Sanogo	Verners Kohs
SF	Andrea Pecchia	Tres Tinkle
SG	David Cournooh	Matteo Spagnolo
PG	Adas Juškevičius	Giuseppe Poeta

(colours: Italian or homegrown players; foreign players; young players)

=== Squad changes ===
==== In ====
No.	Pos.	Nat.	Name	Age	Moving from		Type	Ends	Transfer fee	Date	Source
3	PF	(Ivory Coast) (United States)	Ismael Sanogo	24	Long Island Nets	(United States)	1+1 years	June 2022 + 2023	Free	6 June 2021	
6	SF	(Italy)	Andrea Pecchia	23	Pallacanestro Cantù	(Italy)	1+1 years	June 2022 + 2023	Free	7 July 2021	
24	C	(United States)	Jamuni McNeace	25	Crailsheim Merlins	(Germany)	1 year	June 2022	Free	17 July 2021	
10	SG	(Italy)	Matteo Spagnolo	18	Real Madrid B	(Spain)	Loan contract	June 2022	Undisclosed	24 July 2021	
0	F/C	(Nigeria)	Destiny Agbamy	18	Orange1 Basket Bassano	(Italy)	Loan contract	June 2022	Free	6 August 2021	
2	SG	(United States)	Jalen Harris	23	Toronto Raptors	(Canada)	1 year	June 2022	Free	14 August 2021	
13	F	(United States)	Tres Tinkle	25	Raptors 905	(Canada)	1 year	June 2022	Free	18 August 2021	
31	SF	(United States)	Malcolm Miller	28	Salt Lake City Stars	(United States)	1 year	June 2022	Free	29 August 2021	
41	F/C	(Croatia)	Ivica Radić	31	Pallacanestro Forlì	(Italy)	1 year	June 2022	Free	17 September 2021	
1	C	(Senegal)	Malik Dime	29	Maccabi Rishon LeZion	(Israel)	1 year	June 2022	Free	2 December 2021	
12	PF	(Latvia)	Verners Kohs	24	BK Liepāja	(Latvia)	6 months	June 2022	Free	25 January 2022	
33	G	(Lithuania)	Adas Juškevičius	33	Parma	(Russia)	4 months	June 2022	Free	7 March 2022	

1. In players: Players who signed after the beginning of the season

==== Out ====
No.	Pos.	Nat.	Name	Age	Moving to		Type	Transfer fee	Date	Source
9	SG	(Italy)	Fabio Mian	29	Amici Pallacanestro Udinese	(Italy)	Exit option	Free	21 May 2021	
6	PF	(United States)	Jarvis Williams	28	Rytas Vilnius	(Lithuania)	End of contract	Free	1 July 2021	
4	SG	(Serbia)	Lazar Trunic	20	Casale Monferrato	(Italy)	End of contract	Free	1 July 2021	
73	C	(Italy)	Andrea Donda	21	Círculo Gijón	(Spain)	End of contract	Free	1 July 2021	
24	F/C	(United States)	Marcus Lee	26	Yalovaspor	(Turkey)	End of contract	Free	1 July 2021	
3	PG	(United States)	T. J. Williams	26	Maccabi Rishon LeZion	(Israel)	End of contract	Free	1 July 2021	
34	SF	(United States)	Daulton Hommes	24	New Orleans Pelicans	(United States)	End of contract	Free	1 July 2021	
0	SG	(United States)	Jaylen Barford	25	Astana	(Kazakhstan)	End of contract	Free	1 July 2021	
41	F/C	(Croatia)	Ivica Radić	31	Levski Sofia	(Bulgaria)	Termination	Free	15 October 2021	
31	SF	(United States)	Malcolm Miller	28			Mutual consent	Free	24 January 2022	
2	SG	(United States)	Jalen Harris	23			Mutual consent	Free	16 March 2022	

1. Out players: Players who left before the end of the season

==== Confirmed ====
No.	Pos.	Nat.	Name	Age	Moving from		Type	Ends	Transfer fee	Date	Source
25	G	(Italy)	David Cournooh	30	Virtus Bologna	(Italy)	1 + 2 years	June 2023	Free	4 August 2020	
8	PG	(Italy)	Giuseppe Poeta	35	Reggio Emilia	(Italy)	1 + 1+1 years	June 2022 + 2023	Undisclosed	5 August 2020	

==== Coach ====
Nat.	Name	Age.	Previous team		Type	Ends	Date	Source
(Italy)	Paolo Galbiati	37	(Italy)	Pallacanestro Biella	1 + 2 years	June 2023	30 July 2020	

==== Unsuccessful deals ====
The following deal never activated and the player's contract was withdrawn before the beginning of the season.

Signing date	Withdrawal date	Pos.	Nat.	Name	Age	Moving from		Type	Moved to	
27 July 2021	24 August 2021	SF	(United States)	Haywood Highsmith	24	Crailsheim Merlins	(Germany)	1 year	Philadelphia 76ers	(United States)

== Competitions ==
=== Supercup ===
Pos	Team	Pld	W	L	PF	PA	PD	Qualification
1	Banco di Sardegna Sassari	4	4	0	350	304	+46	Advance to Final Eight
2	Vanoli Cremona	4	1	3	319	337	−18	
3	Openjobmetis Varese	4	1	3	299	327	−28	

Source: LegaBasket Serie A
Rules for classification: All points scored in extra period(s) were not counted in the standings, nor for any tie-break situation.

=== Serie A ===
Pos	Team	Pld	W	L	PF	PA	PD	Pts	Qualification
12	Openjobmetis Varese	30	12	18	2470	2655	−185	24	
13	Dolomiti Energia Trento	30	11	19	2345	2447	−102	22	
14	GeVi Napoli	30	11	19	2393	2455	−62	22	
15	Fortitudo Kigili Bologna	30	9	21	2429	2511	−82	18	Relegation to Serie A2
16	Vanoli Cremona	30	8	22	2386	2535	−149	16	Relegation to Serie A2

Source: LBA
