= 2011–12 Rwanda National Football League =

Rwanda National Football League
- Season: 2011–12
- Champions: A.P.R. (13th title)
- Relegated: Nyanza
- Champions League: A.P.R.
- Confederation Cup: Police
- Matches: 156
- Goals: 353 (2.26 per match)
- Biggest home win: A.P.R. 7–1 Marines (14 March 2012)
- Biggest away win: 6 matches: AS Kigali 0–3 Mukura Victory (25 September 2011); Espoir 0–3 Marines (28 December 2011); Espoir 1–4 Rayon Sports (14 April 2012); La Jeunesse 0–3 A.P.R. (15 April 2012); Kiyovu Sports 0–3 A.P.R. (6 May 2012); Isonga 0–3 Police (18 May 2012)
- Highest scoring: A.P.R. 7–1 Marines (14 March 2012)
- All statistics correct as of 18 May 2012.

The 2011–12 Rwanda National Football League (known as the Primus National Football League for sponsorship reasons) was the 35th season of the Rwanda National Football League since it began in 1975. The league is the highest division in football in Rwanda, and the season began on 17 September 2011 and ended on 18 May 2012. Armée Patriotique Rwandaise, who began the season as the defending champions, extended their record number of titles to 13, stretching the gap between Rayon Sports' titles to 7. Nyanza and Espoir were both to be relegated at the end of the season, but due to the former's sponsors moving to Rayon Sports, they had to withdraw from the league and therefore the latter took their place.

== Clubs ==
Locations of the 2011–12 Rwanda National Football League teams in Rwanda.

A total of 13 teams competed for the title in this season.

Team	Location
Amagaju	Gikongoro
A.P.R.	Kigali
AS Kigali	Kigali
Etincelles	Gisenyi
Espoir	Cyangugu
Isonga	Kigali
Kiyovu Sports	Kigali
La Jeunesse	Kigali
Marines	Gisenyi
Mukura Victory	Butare
Nyanza	Butare
Police	Kibungo
Rayon Sports	Kigali

== League table ==
Pos	Team	Pld	W	D	L	GF	GA	GD	Pts	Qualification or relegation
1	A.P.R. (C, Q)	24	16	4	4	51	21	+30	52	Qualification for 2013 CAF Champions League
2	Police (Q)	24	15	5	4	37	15	+22	50	Qualification for 2013 CAF Confederation Cup
3	Mukura Victory	24	14	7	3	34	14	+20	49	
4	Rayon Sports	24	13	7	4	41	20	+21	46	
5	Kiyovu Sports	24	11	5	8	27	27	0	38	
6	Isonga	24	8	8	8	23	27	−4	32	
7	Etincelles	24	7	7	10	21	25	−4	28	
8	Marines	24	7	7	10	23	33	−10	28	
9	AS Kigali	24	7	5	12	22	31	−9	26	
10	La Jeunesse	24	7	4	13	22	33	−11	25	
11	Amagaju	24	6	7	11	17	28	−11	25	
12	Nyanza (R)	24	6	5	13	17	31	−14	23	Relegation to 2012–13 Rwandan Second Division (Note: Nyanza withdrew from the league after their sponsors moved to Rayon Sports, who relocated from Kigali to Nyanza as a result. Espoir therefore took Nyanza's place in the league.)
13	Espoir	24	1	5	18	18	42	−24	8	

Updated to match(es) played on 18 May 2012. Source: Primus National Football League
Rules for classification: 1) points; 2) goal difference; 3) number of goals scored.
(C) Champions; (Q) Qualified for the phase indicated; (R) Relegated

== Results ==
Home \ Away	AGJ	APR	ASK	ETC	EFC	ISG	KVS	LJN	MRN	MKV	NYZ	POL	RYS
Amagaju		1–1	1–1	2–0	0–0	1–0	1–0	1–0	2–1	0–0	0–2	0–1	0–1
A.P.R.	2–0		2–0	1–1	1–0	2–1	4–1	3–1	7–1	0–1	4–2	2–3	3–2
AS Kigali	1–2	0–2		1–1	2–1	1–1	1–0	3–1	1–0	0–2	0–1	1–2	0–1
Etincelles	1–0	1–3	1–2		1–0	2–2	0–0	1–2	2–0	1–2	1–0	0–1	1–1
Espoir	4–3	1–2	1–1	1–3		0–0	1–2	1–2	0–3	0–2	0–1	1–2	1–4
Isonga	1–1	2–1	3–2	1–0	2–1		0–0	1–1	0–1	1–0	3–1	0–3	0–2
Kiyovu Sports	3–1	0–3	1–0	1–2	2–1	1–1		3–2	1–2	1–0	2–1	0–0	1–1
La Jeunesse	1–1	0–3	3–1	3–1	2–0	0–1	0–1		2–0	0–1	0–2	0–2	2–1
Marines	0–0	1–2	1–0	0–2	3–0	1–1	0–2	0–0		1–1	2–0	1–0	1–1
Mukura Victory	1–0	1–0	1–1	0–0	2–1	2–1	3–0	2–1	2–2		5–0	0–0	0–0
Nyanza	0–0	0–1	0–1	1–0	1–1	0–1	1–3	0–0	1–1	1–2		2–0	1–1
Police	4–0	0–0	3–0	1–1	3–0	2–0	2–1	3–0	1–0	0–1	1–0		2–2
Rayon Sports	2–0	2–2	4–1	3–0	1–0	1–3	0–1	1–0	2–0	3–1	2–0	3–1	

Updated to match(es) played on 18 May 2012. Source: Primus National Football League
Legend: Blue = home team win; Yellow = draw; Red = away team win.
