= Whitaker scandal =

Uganda corruption scandal involving Whitaker Group lobbying firm surfaces

The Whitaker scandal is a corruption scandal in Uganda that surfaced in 2005. The scandal revolves around the Whitaker Group, the lobbying firm of Rosa Whitaker, a former assistant U.S. trade representative for Africa in the Bush administration and payments she received from the Ugandan government. Supporters of the work done on behalf of Uganda by the Whitaker Group, however, have pointed out that the criticisms are politically motivated and not based on an understanding of the full spectrum of work undertaken in the United States by the Whitaker Group
