= NACCC =

NACCC may refer to:

- National Association of Charismatic and Christian Churches, a supervisory association in Ghana
- National Association of Congregational Christian Churches, an association of Congregationalist churches based in the US
- North American Computer Chess Championship, a computer chess championship held from 1970 to 1994
