= Rwandan Second Division =

Championnat National de 2ème Division
- Country: Rwanda
- Confederation: CAF
- Number of clubs: 26
- Level on pyramid: 2
- Promotion to: Rwanda National Football League
- Relegation to: Rwandan Third Division
- Domestic cup: Rwandan Cup
- International cup: Confederation Cup
- Current champions: Rutsiro FC (2023-24)
- Website: http://www.ferwafa.rw/competitions/fixtures
- Current: 2025–26

The Championnat National de 2ème Division (or Rwandan Second Division) is the second tier of Rwandan football, organized by the Rwandese Association Football Federation.

== Clubs ==
The 2024–25 season of the Rwandan Second Division consists of twenty-six teams, divided equally into two groups of thirteen.

=== Group A ===
- Addax FC
- Akagera FC
- Alpha FC
- Aspor FC
- City Boys
- Espérance FC
- Etoile de l'Est
- Impeesa FC
- Intare FC
- Ivoire Olympic
- La Jeunesse FC
- Nyagatare FC
- Unity FC

=== Group B ===
- AS Muhanga
- Gicumbi FC
- Interforce FC
- Kamonyi FC
- Miroplast FC
- Motar FC
- Nyanza FC
- Sina Gerard SC
- Sunrise FC
- Tsinda Batsinde
- UR FC
- United Stars
- Vision JN

== Previous seasons ==
Season	Play-off winners	Group A	Group B
2011–12	Musanze FC	AS Muhanga	Musanze FC
2011–12	Promoted teams via play-offs: Musanze FC and AS Muhanga		
2012–13	Espérance FC		
2012–13	Promoted teams via play-offs: Espérance FC and Gicumbi FC		
2013–14	Sunrise FC	Sunrise FC	SEC Academy
2013–14	Promoted teams via play-offs: Sunrise FC and Isonga FC		
2014–15	Bugesera FC		
2014–15	Promoted teams via play-offs: AS Muhanga, Bugesera FC and Rwamagana City		
2015–16	Pepinières FC		
2015–16	Promoted teams via play-offs: Pepinières FC and Kirehe FC		
2016–17	Miroplast FC	AS Muhanga	Miroplast FC
2016–17	Promoted teams via play-offs: Miroplast FC and Isonga FC		
2017–18	Intare FC		
2017–18	Promoted teams via play-offs: Intare FC and AS Muhanga		
2018–19	Gasogi United	Gasogi United	Etoile de l'Est
2018–19	Promoted teams via play-offs: Gasogi United and Heroes FC		
2019–20	Gorilla FC		
2019–20	Promoted teams via play-offs: Gorilla FC and Rutsiro FC		
2020–21	Gicumbi FC		
2020–21	Promoted teams via play-offs: Gicumbi FC and Etoile de l'Est		
2021–22	Sunrise FC	Sunrise FC	Muhanga Heroes
2021–22	Promoted teams via play-offs: Sunrise FC and Rwamagana City		
2022–23	Etoile de l'Est	Etoile de l'Est	Amagaju FC
2022–23	Promoted teams via play-offs: Etoile de l'Est and Amagaju FC		
2023–24	Rutsiro FC	Rutsiro FC	Vision FC
2023–24	Promoted teams via play-offs: Rutsiro FC and Vision FC		
