= Action Chapel International =

Charismatic church in Accra, Ghana

- 5.625520°N 0.164715°W
- Location: Spintex Road, Accra
- Country: Ghana
- Denomination: Pentecostal–Charismatic
- Website: actionchapel.net

History
- Status: Active
- Founded: 1979
- Founder: Nicholas Duncan-Williams

Architecture
- Groundbreaking: 1992

Specifications
- Capacity: 8,000

Action Chapel International (ACI) is a Charismatic Christian church based in Accra, Ghana. The church was founded by Nicholas Duncan-Williams in 1979 and is credited as the first indigenous Charismatic church in Ghana. Its headquarters is the "Prayer Cathedral" on Spintex Road, near Accra airport. It is the headquarters of Christian Action Faith Ministries (CAFM), the original name of the church, which later became an umbrella organisation for the church and related institutions. The church's network of congregations is known as the United Denominations of Action Chapel International.

== History ==
=== Founding ===
Nicholas Duncan-Williams became a born-again Christian while he was being treated at Korle-Bu Teaching Hospital, and afterwards joined the Church of Pentecost. He met the Nigerian evangelist Benson Idahosa at a crusade in Ghana in 1977 and then studied at Idahosa's Christ for All Nations Bible School in Benin City, Nigeria, returning to Ghana in 1978.

Nicholas Duncan-Williams, a disciple of Idahosa, founded the Christian Action Faith Ministries (CAFM) and the Action Chapel International (ACI) church in 1979. The church grew out of a small prayer fellowship that he started in his father's house in August 1979. The CAFM was the first Charismatic church in Ghana. It was followed by the International Central Gospel Church (ICGC) in 1984. Some writers give that distinction to the Redemption Hour church, which Idahosa planted in Accra after a 1978 crusade; ACI is nonetheless credited as the first Charismatic church established as an indigenous Ghanaian initiative.

=== Growth ===
By 1984 the church reported Sunday attendance of more than 3,000. In July 1988 it hosted the American evangelist Oral Roberts together with Idahosa at an event that filled a stadium in Accra with a capacity of more than 20,000. Also in 1984, the church established Action International Bible College (also known as Dominion Theological Seminary), the first Bible college founded by a Charismatic church in Ghana.

The first branch churches were planted in Dansoman, Madina and Tema between 1986 and 1987, making ACI the first Charismatic church in Ghana to have branches. By 1989 Nicholas Duncan-Williams had released these branches to the pastors in charge, and they later became financially and administratively independent. By 1996 the church had moved its headquarters to its permanent site on Spintex Road. The Christian Action Faith Ministries has its headquarters at Action Chapel International, which is one of Accra's largest mega-churches.

=== 1990s and 2000s ===
In 1995 there were about 8,000 members of the church. The church held just one service on Sunday morning in English, with translation into Ewe and French. The exuberant "praise and worship" part of the service was musical. Choirs and soloists performed, but in most songs the whole congregation participated, with a 10-piece band as backup. A single hymn might last for twenty minutes, with much repetition, creating an exhilarating experience. The music would be followed by the sermon.

By 1998 Nicholas Duncan-Williams was mainly resident in the US. Bishop James Saah and pastor Clive Mold were running the church in Ghana. Nicholas Duncan-Williams divorced his wife Francisca in March 2001, but later remarried her. Francisca Duncan-Williams was active in the church, organizing all the women's activities, and was founder of the Pastors' Wives and Women in Ministry Association. The couple's personal problems may have affected church attendance. About 3,000 people were attending the Sunday services in 2003, many of them middle-class professionals and business people. At this time the church held two services on Sunday, as well as other sessions throughout the week. This was down from about 6,000 attendees five years earlier.

As of 2015 Nicholas Duncan-Williams was still head of Action Chapel International, and was also chairman of the National Association of Charismatic and Christian Churches (NACCC).

== Prayer Cathedral ==
Construction of the Prayer Cathedral, on a six-acre plot on Spintex Road allocated to the church by the Ghana Lands Commission, began with a groundbreaking by Benson Idahosa in 1992. Action Chapel International has met in the building since 1992, although it was not opened officially until 2002 and as of 2003 was still under construction. It was formally inaugurated and dedicated in December 2002 by the then President of Ghana, John Kufuor. The 8,000-seat Prayer Cathedral of Action Chapel International on Spintex Road is the largest church building in Accra.

== Beliefs and worship ==
Action Chapel International belongs to the Pentecostal–Charismatic tradition. Nicholas Duncan-Williams drew from Idahosa an emphasis on faith and prosperity, and a 2022 doctoral study of his ministry concludes that it contributed, directly or indirectly, to an emphasis on the preaching of prosperity and to the "charismatisation" of Ghanaian Christianity. Prayer is central to the church's identity: Nicholas Duncan-Williams is widely known as the "Apostle of Strategic Prayer", and the church's warfare prayers retain influences from the Church of Pentecost.

The church's weekly gatherings are its Sunday services, a Wednesday teaching and communion service, and a Thursday prayer meeting known as "Dominion Hour" (formerly "Jericho Hour").

== IMPACT Convention ==
The IMPACT Convention is the church's annual gathering of members from all its branches. It is held over a week from the last Sunday of November to the first Sunday of December, and ministers are consecrated, ordained and licensed during it. Speakers have included T. D. Jakes, Jerry Savelle and Paula White. The 2025 convention, its 45th edition, was held at the Prayer Cathedral from 30 November to 7 December 2025; previous editions had drawn more than 30,000 attendees. The church also holds an annual Easter convention.

== Institutions ==
=== Education ===
The Bible college, founded in 1984 to train the church's clergy, initially offered devotional-level courses; by 1990 it awarded non-accredited certificates and diplomas in theology. In 2009 the church established Dominion University College as a separate institution from the seminary. It was accredited by Ghana's National Accreditation Board in 2012, with the University of Cape Coast as its degree-awarding institution. ACI sponsored the university college until 2018, when ownership passed from the church to the African Leadership Institute. In January 2026 the university college was rebranded as Southshore University College.

=== Media ===
Nicholas Duncan-Williams's television and radio programme is known as Voice of Inspiration; it was aired on Sunday mornings on Ghana Television. Nicholas Duncan-Williams and ACI also owned a satellite channel, Dominion Television. Launched by Nicholas Duncan-Williams and his wife Rosa Whitaker, Dominion TV became available across Africa on DStv and GOtv in January 2020. The channel ended its broadcasts on 31 October 2025 and relaunched as Dominion Studios, a production company making content for digital and streaming platforms.

== See also ==
- Christianity in Ghana

== Sources ==
- Essamuah, Casely B.; Ngaruiya, David K. (2014-01-13). Communities of Faith in Africa and the African Diaspora: In Honor of Dr. Tite Tienou with Additional Essays on World Christianity. Wipf and Stock Publishers. ISBN 978-1-63087-307-3.
- Gifford, Paul (1998). African Christianity: Its Public Role. Indiana University Press. ISBN 978-0-253-21204-7.
- Gifford, Paul (2004). Ghana's New Christianity: Pentecostalism in a Globalizing African Economy. Indiana University Press. ISBN 978-0-253-21723-3.
- Lindhardt, Martin (2014-10-29). Pentecostalism in Africa: Presence and Impact of Pneumatic Christianity in Postcolonial Societies. BRILL. ISBN 978-90-04-28187-5.
- Ntiamoah Duah, Eric MacLean (2012-12-01). Accra City Guide: The Indispensable Companion. AuthorHouse. ISBN 978-1-4772-5890-3.
- Sackey, Brigid M. (2006). New Directions in Gender and Religion: The Changing Status of Women in African Independent Churches. Lexington Books. ISBN 978-0-7391-1058-4.
- Sallah, Bernard (2022). Nicholas Duncan-Williams and the Charismatic Ministries in Ghana (PhD thesis). University of Birmingham.
- Soothill, Jane E. (2007). Gender, Social Change and Spiritual Power: Charismatic Christianity in Ghana. BRILL. ISBN 978-90-04-15789-7.
- "Welcome to National Association of Chrismatic & Christian Churches (NACCC)". NACCC. Archived from the original on 2015-05-18.
