= Sandra Appiah =

Ghanaian entrepreneur

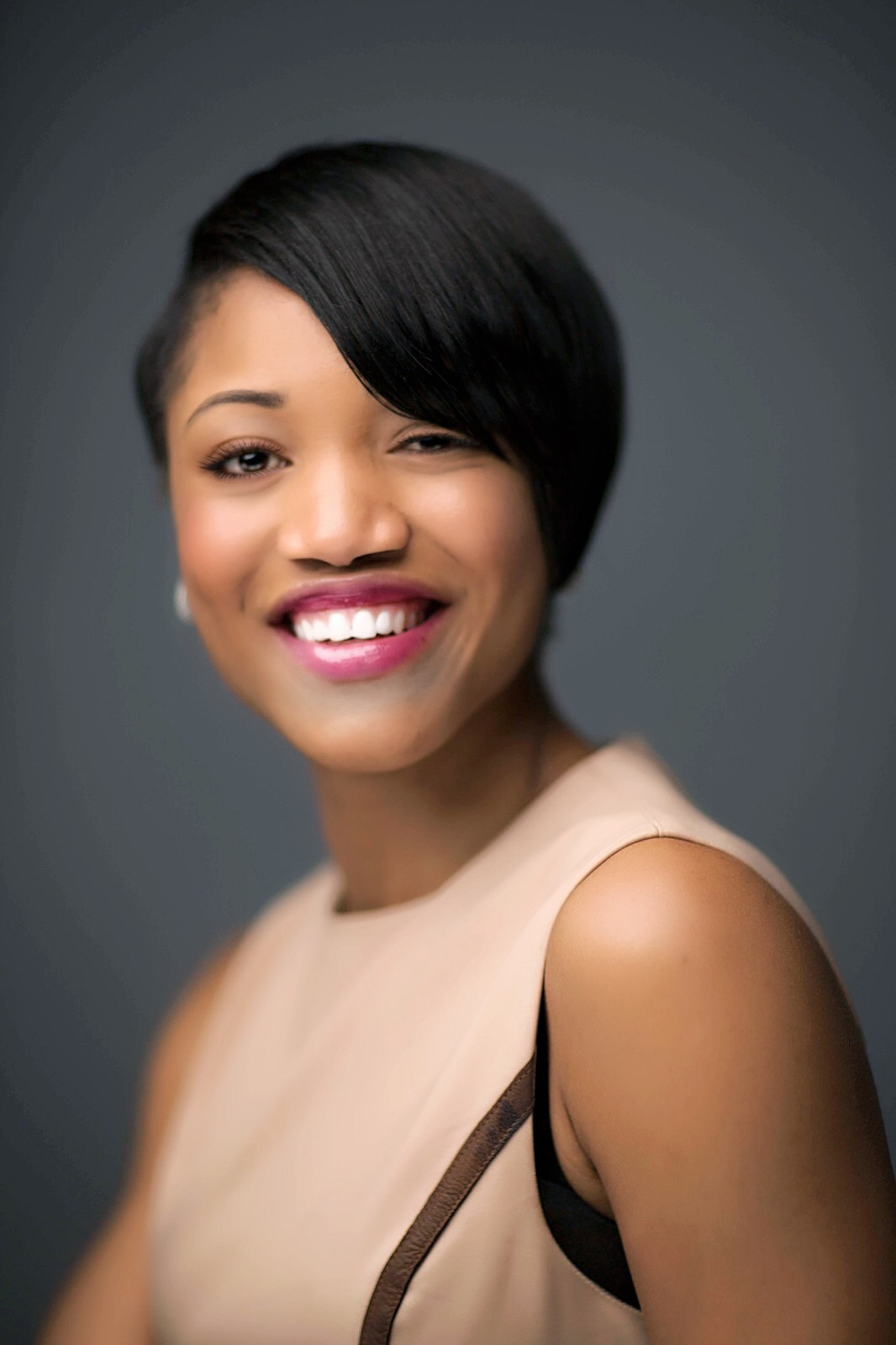
- Born: March 30, 1989 (age 37); Ghana
- Occupations: Media Entrepreneur Co-Founder & CEO, Face2Face Africa Co-Founder, PanaGenius Inc.

Sandra Appiah (born March 30, 1989) is the co-founder of media company Face2face Africa, and its CEO from 2016 to 2020. In 2019, she launched PanaGenius Inc. With Face2face Africa as its flagship brand, PanaGenius reaches over 2 million users each month via its online platforms and engages thousands more via events such as the Pan-African Weekend Conference in New York City and the national 30 Black Stars Conference & Awards.

== Early life and education ==
Appiah was born in eastern Ghana in a small town in 1989, immigrated to Italy at the age of 8, and lived in Milan. At the age of 12, her family immigrated again to New York City. Appiah attended high school in the Bronx, where she graduated as valedictorian and received a scholarship to the S. I. Newhouse School of Public Communications at Syracuse University. She majored in television, radio, and film with a minor in acting, and graduated magna cum laude, supported by the New York Times College Scholarship and the Jonathan Levin(Time Warner)Scholarship. She experienced racism and misinformed beliefs about Africans in Italy and in the US, from African-Americans as well as from other ethnicities. As a result, she felt ashamed of her heritage, until a return visit to Ghana during her second year at university.

== Career ==
After graduation, Appiah worked for The New York Times, HBO, and MTV. She was also a filmmaker of several award-winning documentaries. In 2011, Appiah and partner Isaac O. Babu-Boateng launched Face2Face Africa, a pan-African media company. Drawing from their experiences growing up as African immigrants in the United States, the two created an online platform and a print magazine in order to help rebrand the image of Africa within the global community. Appiah is the editor-in-chief of Face2face Africa's print magazine. In 2020, they launched PanaGenius Inc, which will be parent company to Face2face Africa and other digital platforms.

Appiah has also hosted an online talk show, interviewing among others Jesse Jackson, Alek Wek, Femi Kuti, Serge Ibaka, and Lira. She has spoken at conferences and forums on Africa, women empowerment, and other pertinent social issues.
