= United Denomination: Lighthouse Group of Churches =

Pentecostal Christian denomination headquartered in Ghana

Coordinates: 5.587981°N 0.230065°W

United Denominations Originating from the Lighthouse Group of Churches
- Theology: Pentecostal
- Language: Multilingual
- Headquarters: Qodesh, Accra, Ghana
- Founder: Dag Heward-Mills
- Origin: 1987
- Official website: daghewardmills.org

Location of the Qodesh in Ghana (Ghana)

The United Denominations Originating from the Lighthouse Group of Churches (formerly "Lighthouse Chapel International") is a Pentecostal Christian denomination founded in 1987 by Dag Heward-Mills and headquartered in Accra, Ghana.

== Structure ==
UD-OLGC is made up of several denominations, over 7,500 churches, two archbishops and over 250 bishops across three continents. Heward-Mills is the presiding Bishop of UD-OLGC. The current convener of the UD-OLGC is Bishop Ishmael Sam of the Loyalty House International denomination.

=== Denominations ===
The denominations include:

- Anagkazo Assemblies: Ghana, Burkina Faso and Ivory Coast
- Catch the Anointing Centre: Ghana, Liberia, Sierra Leone and Guinea
- Greater Love Church Ghana: Ghana and Equatorial Guinea
- Healing Jesus Mission International: Ghana, Democratic Republic of Congo (DRC), Gabon and Central African Republic (CAR)
- Jesus is the Answer Church: Ghana and Mali
- Lighthouse Chapel International: Ghana, DRC, Gabon, Kenya, Uganda, UAE, Qatar, Eswatini, Namibia, and CAR
- Loyalty House International: Ghana, DRC, Gabon and CAR
- The Machaneh Church International: Ghana, Zambia, Zimbabwe and Tanzania
- The Makarios Church: Ghana, Senegal, Gambia and Guinea Bissau
- Mekadesh Church International: Ethiopia
- Mustard Seed Chapel International: United Kingdom
- Living Waters International: Switzerland, Liechtenstein, Austria
- Qodesh Family Church: Ghana
- Revelation Church of Asia: Asia
- Revival International, American Missionary Church, Laikos International Church: United States and Canada
- Shepherd House International: Jamaica, Caribbean
- Strong Christian Church, Serious Christian Church: South Africa, Lesotho
- Jesus Gefunden Gemeinde: Germany
- Go Church: Belgium

== Beliefs ==
The church opposes prosperity theology.

UD-OLGC's work includes building churches and hospitals, training pastors, helping people living in poverty and with disability, and holding evangelistic campaigns in many nations.

UD-OLDC is a member of the National Association of Charismatic and Christian Churches (NACCC) and the Pentecostal World Fellowship.

== Controversies ==
In 2018, Dag Heward-Mills and Lighthouse Chapel International came into legal conflict with residents of Akuapim-Mampong after blocking major access roads during the construction of a church project. Lighthouse was cited for contempt of court.

In 2021, The Fourth Estate, a journalism project related to the Media Foundation for West Africa (MFWA), documented the alleged abuse of former pastors by Lighthouse. The abusive practices included the non-payment of SSNIT contributions. Subsequently, Lighthouse filed multiple suits against the media platform.

In 2022, a high court in Accra fined investigative journalist Manasseh Azure and three others after Lighthouse filed a contempt application against them.

In 2026, Belgian investigative journalism program Pano (linked to public broadcaster VRT 1) and De Morgen jointly uncovered various instances of financial exploitation, harassment, and sexual assault of minors in Belgian churches belonging to the Lighthouse network. The investigation also found that the churches systematically targeted a vulnerable and underage public with the goal of putting pressure to raise money from them. This led to the shutting down of these churches in a number of cities.

== See also ==
- Church service
- List of the largest evangelical churches
- List of the largest evangelical church auditoriums
