= Emmanuel Sanogo =

Malian footballer

Personal information
- Full name: Emmanuel Sanogo
- Date of birth: 7 April 1997 (age 29)
- Place of birth: Bamako, Mali
- Height: 1.85 m (6 ft 1 in)
- Position: Forward

Team information
- Current team: Yangon United
- Number: 10

Senior career*
Years	Team	Apps	(Gls)
2015–2016	Kawkab Marrakesh	17	(5)
2016–2017	Widad Témara	23	(8)
2017–2018	Ethiopian Coffee F.C.	12	(3)
2018-2020	CSK Bamako	22	(6)
2020-2021	Futuro Kings	14	(4)
2021-2022	Gorilla F.C. (Rwanda)	10	(2)
2022-2023	Al-Najma Benghazi	19	(4)
2023	Kenkre FC	7	(0)
2024-present	Yangon United	5	(2)
- * Club domestic league appearances and goals

Emmanuel Sanogo (born 7 April 1997) is a Malian footballer who plays as a forward for Myanmar National League club Yangon United.

== Career ==
Born in Bamako, Sanogo began his career with CSK Bamako in his home country in 2013, later moving to Moroccan club Kawkab Marrakesh where he spent his late teenage years and a loan at Olympique Safi Reserve.

=== Club moves ===
Sanogo made a move to Moroccan side Widad Témara in 2016. On 8 July 2017, he signed a one-year contract with Ethiopian Coffee F.C. On 4 September 2018, Sanogo joined Malian side CSK Bamako on a two-year deal. Later in 2020, Futuro Kings of the Equatorial Guinea completed the signing of Sanogo.

He joined Rwandan club Gorilla F.C. (Rwanda) ahead of the 2020–21 season, signing a two-year contract. On January 1, 2022, Sanogo signed a two-and-a-half-year contract with Libyan club Al-Najma Benghazi.

After a two-week trial, Sanogo signed with Kenkre FC on 3 September 2023.

=== Yangon United ===
In September 2023, Sanogo moved to the Myanmar National League and signed with Yangon United on a two-year deal.
