= Nicholas Duncan-Williams =

Ghanaian pastor (born 1957)

Archbishop Nicholas Duncan-Williams
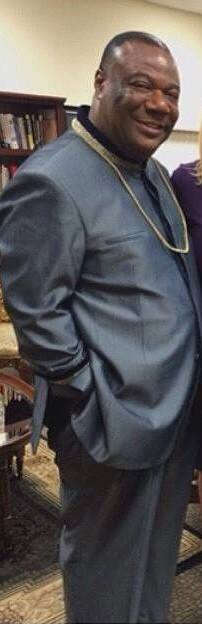
- The Archbishop Nicholas Duncan-Williams
- Born: 12 May 1957 (age 69); Kumasi, Ghana
- Education: ANFCBII
- Spouse(s): Francisca Osei Williams (m. 2007, divorced) Rosa Whitaker (m. 2008)
- Children: 4 Elsie, Ella, Joel, Daniel
- Parent(s): Florence Taiwo Nana Akweley Bruce; E.K. Duncan-Williams
- Religion: Christianity
- Church: Action Chapel International
- Congregations served: Prayer Cathedral, Spintex Road, Accra
- Offices held: Head Pastor, Prayer Cathedral; Chancellor (Dominion Theological Seminary)
- Title: Founder, ACI; Head Pastor, ACI Prayer Cathedral
- Website: actionchapel.net

Nicholas Duncan-Williams (born 12 May 1957) is a Ghanaian religious leader and Independent Charismatic preacher, serving as the presiding Archbishop and General Overseer of the Action Chapel International (ACI) Ministry. Headquartered in Accra, Ghana, ACI operates globally with affiliates and branch churches in North America, Europe, and Africa. In 2017, he led the prayer for the United States President-elect and Vice President-elect ahead of the inauguration. Duncan-Williams is a proponent of spiritual warfare prayer and is the spiritual father of American apostolic leader and preacher Paula White.

== Career ==
Duncan-Williams is the founder and President of Prayer Summit International (PSI). In 2012, he became the spiritual father of Paula White, an American televangelist and apostolic leader and spiritual advisor to American president Donald Trump. Duncan-Williams notably led the prayer for the incoming President and Vice President of the United States during the 2017 inauguration, becoming the first non-American to do so. He is known for his ties to several presidents of Ghana and the United States.

He is married to Rosa Whitaker. As Deputy U.S. Trade Representative for Africa under Presidents Bill Clinton and George W. Bush, she was one of the architects of the African Growth and Opportunity Act (AGOA) in 2000, a trade agreement allowing African countries to export products to the United States without paying taxes. Having switched to business, Rosa Whitaker created a consulting firm, the Whitaker Group, which works with African countries, including Ghana. In 2017, Rosa Whitaker took control of Dominion TV, the leading pan-African media outlet dedicated to Christianity, which broadcasts in 48 countries, providing a major platform for her husband, who has since become a key figure in Ghana and along the Gulf of Guinea.

In 2017, Duncan-Williams was recognized by the New African Magazine as one of “The 100 Most Influential Africans". Additionally, Duncan-Williams and his wife, Rosa Whitaker of The Whitaker Group have been acknowledged a notable couple in Africa.

He lives in the United States.

=== Dominion University ===
Duncan-Williams is the founder of Dominion University, based in Ghana. The university's mission is to train a new generation in excellence and ethical leadership for ministry, government, and business.

== Publications ==
Books self published by Duncan-Williams include:

- Nicholas Duncan-Williams (1999). Born with a Destiny. Bishop House.
- Nicholas Duncan-Williams (1999). Birthing the Promises of God in Travail. Bishop House.
- Nicholas Duncan-Williams (2009). The Incredible Power of a Praying Woman. XULON Press.
- Archbishop Nicholas Duncan-Williams (2012). Divine Timing. Xulon Press, Incorporated.
- Archbishop Nicholas Duncan-Williams (2012). The Supernatural Powers of a Praying Man. Salem Publishing Solutions, Incorporated.
- Archbishop Nicholas Duncan-Williams (2012). The Price of Greatness. Salem Publishing Solutions, Incorporated.
- Archbishop Nicholas Duncan-Williams (2012). Destined to Make an Impact. Xulon Press, Incorporated.
- Archbishop Nicholas Duncan-Williams (2012). Binding the Strong Man. Xulon Press, Incorporated.
- Archbishop Nicholas Duncan-Williams (2013). Praying Through the Promises of God. Xulon Press, Incorporated.
- Archbishop Nicholas Duncan-Williams (2015). Prayer Moves God. Prayer Summit Publishing.
- Archbishop Nicholas Duncan-Williams. Building a Memorial. Bishop House.
- Archbishop Nicholas Duncan-Williams (2015). Enforcing Prophetic Decrees Vol. 1. Prayer Summit Publishing.
- Archbishop Nicholas Duncan-Williams (2016). Enforcing Prophetic Decrees Vol. 2: Prayer Watch for Community Transformation. Prayer Summit Publishing.
- Archbishop Nicholas Duncan-Williams (2014). Powers Behind the Scene. Prayer Summit Publishing.
- Archbishop Nicholas Duncan-Williams (2015). Understanding the Father Factor. Prayer Summit Publishing.
- Archbishop Nicholas Duncan-Williams (2012). When Mothers Pray. Prayer Summit Publishing.
- Archbishop Nicholas Duncan-Williams. Divine Timing. Prayer Summit Publishing.
- Archbishop Nicholas Duncan-Williams. Worship a Secret Weapon. Prayer Summit Publishing.
- Archbishop Nicholas Duncan-Williams (2012). Turning Pain to Power. Prayer Summit Publishing.

=== Filmography ===
- 2023: A Taste Of Sin - As himself

== See also ==
- Benson Idahosa
- Charismatic Movement

== Sources ==
- "About ARCHBISHOP NICHOLAS DUNCAN WILLIAMS". Facebook.
- "Archbishop Nicholas Duncan-Williams". Action Worship Center. Archived from the original on 18 May 2015.
- ""Demonic" Ebola targeting Ghana by November – Archbishop Duncan Williams". Joy Online. 13 October 2014. Archived from the original on 18 May 2015.
- Online, Peace FM (3 November 2014). "Divorce Is Not Easy And Simple As You Think - Duncan-Williams". Peace FM Online. Archived from the original on 18 May 2015.
- "Don't divorce because I did – Duncan-Williams". myjoyonline. 3 November 2014. Archived from the original on 18 May 2015.
- Gifford, Paul (1998). African Christianity: Its Public Role. Indiana University Press. ISBN 978-0-253-21204-7.
- Jane E. Soothill (2007). Gender, Social Change and Spiritual Power: Charismatic Christianity in Ghana. BRILL. ISBN 978-90-04-15789-7.
- Korieh, Chima Jacob; Nwokeji, G. Ugo; Nnaemeka, Obioma (2005). Religion, History, and Politics in Nigeria: Essays in Honor of Ogbu U. Kalu. University Press of America. ISBN 978-0-7618-3140-2.
- "Marriage is a privilege - Duncan-Williams tells women". Graphic Online. 29 October 2014. Archived from the original on 31 October 2014.
- Martin Lindhardt (29 October 2014). Pentecostalism in Africa: Presence and Impact of Pneumatic Christianity in Postcolonial Societies. BRILL. ISBN 978-90-04-28187-5.
- Paul Gifford (2004). Ghana's New Christianity: Pentecostalism in a Globalizing African Economy. Indiana University Press. ISBN 978-0-253-21723-3.
- Sackey, Brigid M. (2006). New Directions in Gender and Religion: The Changing Status of Women in African Independent Churches. Lexington Books. ISBN 978-0-7391-1058-4.
- "Welcome to National Association of Chrismatic & Christian Churches (NACCC)". NACCC. Archived from the original on 18 May 2015.
- Yolaan Begbie (29 August 2013). "Africa's Top Power Couples". Afritorial. Archived from the original on 24 May 2015.
