= Face2Face Africa =

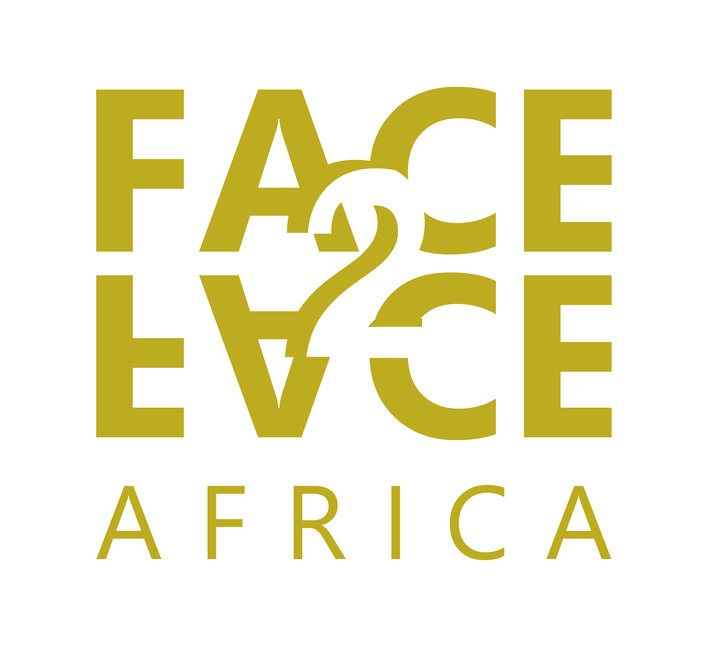
- Founded: 2011; 15 years ago
- Founders: Isaac O. Babu-Boateng and Sandra Appiah
- Website: www.face2faceafrica.com

Face2Face Africa is a media company based in New York, U.S. The company's online portal reports on Global Black news and current affairs covering topics such as politics, entertainment, and culture. Face2Face Africa holds events, such as the 30 Black Stars Conference & Awards, the Pan-African Weekend, the FACE List Awards Gala, the IAAPA Networking Mixer Series and the Pan-African Women Forum.

== History ==
Face2Face Africa was launched in 2011 in New York City by two Ghanaian-Americans, Isaac O. Babu-Boateng and Sandra Appiah, to address the lack of racial representation in the digital media industry. In the same year they were featured in Forbes "30 Under 30: Africa’s Best Young Entrepreneurs".

Face2Face Africa primarily serves and reaches a global audience of people of African descent, which includes Africans, Black-Americans, Caribbean-Americans, and Afro-Europeans.

== Events ==
Face2Face Africa hosts several events throughout the year. The company's networking mixer IAAPA is the longest running quarterly networking mixer series for pan-African professionals in New York City. Notable personalities such as Dr. Mo Ibrahim, Mimi Alemayehou, Alek Wek, Boris Kodjoe, Rev. Al Sharpton, Masai Ujiri, Wyclef Jean, Femi Kuti, Jimmy Jean-Louis, Rosa Whitaker, Vanessa De Luca, Marcus Samuelsson, Serge Ibaka, and others have been honored at the FACE List Awards, the company’s annual pan-African achievement awards.
