= Match! Arena =

Russian pay sport television channel

Match! Arena Матч! Арена
- Country: Russia
- Network: Gazprom-Media
- Headquarters: Moscow, Russia

Programming
- Picture format: 576i (SDTV) 16:9; 1080i (HDTV) 16:9

Ownership
- Owner: Gazprom-Media
- Sister channels: Russia-1, Russia-2, Bibigon, Russia-K, Russia-24, Sport, RTR-Planeta

History
- Launched: 10 August 2010; 10 years ago (as Sport-1), 25 January 2016; 4 years ago (as Match! Arena)

Links
- Website: http://sportodin.ru/

Availability

Terrestrial
- Analogue: -

Match! Arena (Russian: Матч! Арена), formerly Sport-1 (Russian: Спорт-1) until January 25, 2016, is a Russian pay sport television channel that broadcasts in SD & HDTV 16:9 format.

It was launched on August 10, 2010 by the All-Russia State Television and Radio Broadcasting Company under the name Sport-1 (Russian: Спорт-1). In October 2015, Sport-1 was acquired by Gazprom-Media and subsequently re-branded as Match! Arena.

== Broadcast ==
- Football:
  - FIFA: 2014 FIFA World Cup (qualifiers matches), FIFA Confederations Cup.
  - European national tournaments: Ligue 1, FA Cup, DFB-Pokal.
  - UEFA: UEFA Europa League (qualification rounds, matches with the participation of Russian clubs).
  - Conmebol: Copa Libertadores, Copa Sudamericana.
- Hockey: KHL (The Finals), IIHF World Championships
- Autosport: Formula 1 (including all practices), Porsche Supercup, Formula Renault, DTM, IndyCar
- Biathlon: World Cup, World Championships
- Boxing: professional boxing
- Olympics: 2014 Winter Olympics
