= Mario Fioretti =

American basketball player and coach

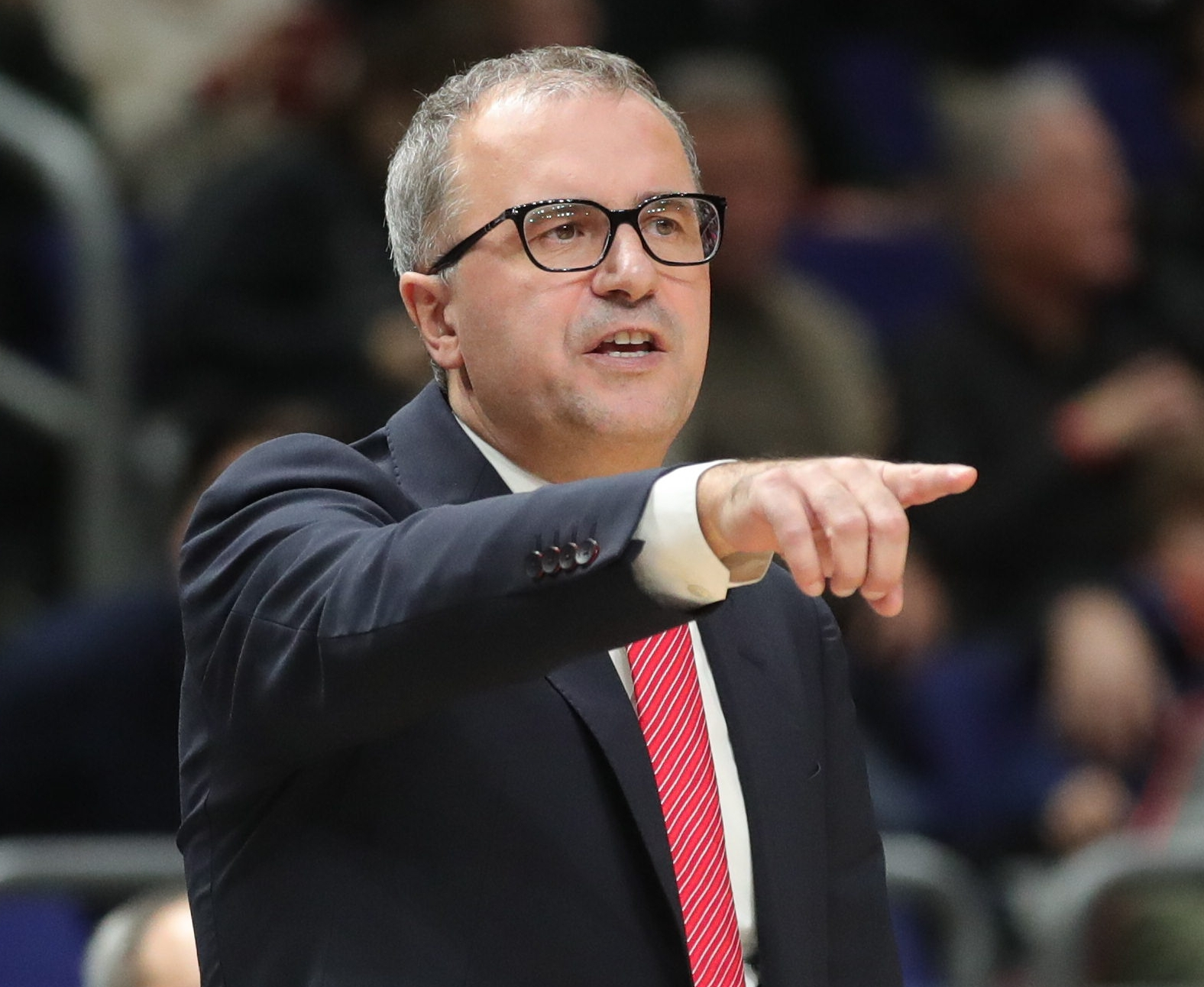
- Fioretti in 2023

Derthona Basket
- Position: Head coach
- League: LBA

Personal information
- Born: 11 September 1973 (age 53) Bergamo, Italy
- Coaching career: 1999–present

Career history

Coaching
- 1999–2000: Indiana Hoosiers (assistant)
- 2004–2025: Olimpia Milano (assistant)
- 2025–present: Derthona Basket

Career highlights
- As assistant coach: 5× Italian League champion (2014, 2016, 2018, 2022, 2023); 4× Italian Cup champion (2016, 2017, 2021, 2022); 4× Italian Supercup champion (2016–2018, 2020); 3× Torneo Castelletto Ticino winner (2009, 2018–2019)

Mario Fioretti (born 11 September 1973 ) is an Italian professional basketball coach, who currently serves as head coach for Derthona Basket of the Lega Basket Serie A (LBA). Prior, he was an assistant coach for 22 season at Olimpia Milano of the LBA and the EuroLeague.

== Coaching career ==
After graduating, he traveled to America wherein he became an assistant coach to Bobby Knight, the head coach of the Indiana Hoosiers. He stayed there for a year. After that, he went back to Italy and became an assistant coach for the Olimpia Milano in 2004 under head coach Attilio Caja. Since then, he has become a vital part of the team's coaching staff.

On June 16, 2025, he signed with Derthona of the Italian Lega Basket Serie A (LBA).

=== Youth coaching career ===
Fioretti is also an assistant coach for several youth teams in Bergamo since 2003.

== Personal life ==
Mario Fioretti was born in Bergamo, in the Lombardy Region of Northern Italy. He graduated with a degree in Economics at University of Bergamo in 1999.
