= Match! Game =

Russian pay TV channel

Match! Game Матч! Игра
- Country: Russia
- Headquarters: Moscow, Russia

Programming
- Picture format: 4:3 (576i, SDTV)

Ownership
- Owner: Gazprom-Media
- Sister channels: Russia-1, Russia-2, Bibigon, Russia-K, Russia-24, Sport-1, RTR-Planeta

History
- Launched: 4 April 2011 (as Sport-2), 13 August 2012 (as Sport), 25 January 2016 (as Match! Game)
- Former names: Sport 2 (4 April 2011-12 August 2012); Sport (12 August 2012-25 January 2016)

Links
- Website: https://matchtv.ru/channels

Match! Game (Russian: Матч! Игра) is a Russian pay TV channel. The channel broadcasts in SD 4:3 format. It was founded April 4, 2011 by the All-Russia State Television and Radio Broadcasting Company under the name "Sport-2" (Russian: Спорт-2). From August 13, 2012 to January 25, 2016 the channel was known as "Sport" (Russian: Спорт). In October 2015, Gazprom-Media acquired the channel. January 25, 2016 changed its name to "Match! Game".

== Programmes ==
- Vsyo Vklyucheno (Everything Included): a program from Russia 2

== Sports events broadcast by Sport TV ==
- Football: Football Championship of the National League
- Biathlon: Russian Championship 2011
- Volleyball: Russian (Men's and women's) championships
- Figure skating: 2011 European Figure Skating Championships
- Athletics: 2011 European Athletics Indoor Championships
- Bandy: Russian Bandy Super League
- Autosport: RCRS, SMP F4 Championship
