= DMAX (Italian TV channel) =

Italian television channel

- Country: Italy
- Broadcast area: Italy, reaching bordering regions via overspill of the Italian terrestrial network

Programming
- Languages: Italian; English
- Picture format: 1080i HDTV

Ownership
- Owner: Warner Bros. Discovery EMEA
- Sister channels: Nove; Discovery; Discovery Turbo; Food Network; Frisbee; Giallo; HGTV; K2; Real Time

History
- Launched: 10 November 2011; 15 years ago

Links
- Website: dmax.it

Availability

Terrestrial
- Digital terrestrial television: Channel 52 (HD)

Streaming media
- Discovery+: DMAX HD

DMAX is an Italian free-to-air television channel owned by Skydance Corporation, launched in 2011 as Discovery Communications' second free-to-air channel, after Real Time. Since its launch, Laura Carafoli has overseen the channel; she also directed Real Time since 2010.

It is Italy's first factual-entertainment channel aimed at a male audience. Its programming consists largely of factual and reality television, as well as some sports.

== History ==
The Italian version of the channel began broadcasting at 6:45 pm on 10 November 2011 with the show Destroyed in Seconds; before its launch, the channel aired a loop of promotional material on its LCN (52).

On 13 September 2012, DMAX unveiled its autumn 2012 programming season, introducing a new slogan (Lo guardi, lo vivi; "You watch, you live"), a reface designed by Harriman Steel in London and the first two Italian productions, Football Hooligans and Milano City Tattoo. DMAX also unveiled a new website featuring catch-up services and previews of upcoming programs. On 17 December 2012, DMAX launched on Tivùsat channel 28. By then, the channel's share had stabilised at 1%.

The channel's success was attributed to Discovery's efforts to attract men aged 20-49 male demographic. In 2013, DMAX was the fastest-growing television channel in Italy; its growth also coincided with the acquisition of television rights to the 2014 Six Nations Championship in order to attract more viewers. The mix of reality shows, featuring an "ironic and slightly exaggerated tone", as well as its "rhythmic and modern language", captured a predominantly young demographic. The channel also helped make Gabriele Rubini, known as Chef Rubio, famous through the on-the-road cooking show Unti e bisunti. By March 2014, its Facebook account had over 500,000 followers. On 9 April, DMAX moved to channel 136 on Sky, launching the +1 timeshift on channel 137.

On 6 February 2015, DMAX added the Discovery symbol to its screen bug in an attempt to unify its portfolio of free-to-air channels.

On 4 January 2016, it aired Z Nation, its first scripted television series, marking its premiere on free-to-air television. The series aired on Monday nights.

On 2 May 2016, DMAX unveiled a new identity and the slogan "In ogni uomo, c'è un maschio DMAX" (in each man, there's a DMAX male). During the summer, it held a promotional campaign to find the "real DMAX male" in Monza, and on the beaches of Romagna, Salento and Naples.

On 1 March 2019, DMAX HD and DMAX +1 became available on Tivùsat at LCNs 28 and 128, respectively, replacing the SD version. On 13 March 2019, the SD version closed on Sky Italia, ending SD broadcasts of the channel on satellite. From 9 April, DMAX, together with the other free-to-air channels of the group, became available in high-definition streaming on Dplay.

On 1 December 2020, DMAX +1 was shut down. It covered all Six Nations matches until 2021.

On 8 March 2022, DMAX closed its SD feed, which was replaced by the HD feed, as part of an Italian decision to convert most national channels (RAI, Mediaset, La7, and Discovery Italia) to high definition, while switching its encoding from MPEG-2 to MPEG-4.

On 26 March 2024, WWE's official commentators for the network, Michele Posa and Luca Franchini, announced that for the first time in 30 years, Wrestlemania would be available on a free-to-pay channel in Italy in prime time on 13 April and 14 April.

In December 2025, the channel was added to DAZN Italia, as part of an agreement with Warner Bros. Discovery.

The channel is expected to move soon to LCN 37, with the former slot being used for a possible CNN Italia with Antenna Group.
