= Nyanza F.C. =

Rwandan football club

Nyanza Football Club
- Full name: Nyanza Football Club
- Dissolved: 2012 (absorbed by Rayon Sports)
- Ground: Nyanza Stadium; Nyanza, Rwanda
- Capacity: 1,000
- League: Rwanda National Football League
- 2011–12: 12th (relegated)

Nyanza Football Club was an association football club based in Nyanza, Rwanda. The team played its home games at the Nyanza Stadium.

In 2012, the club was acquired by Rayon Sports, who are also based in the town of Nyanza.
