= Dag Heward-Mills =

Ghanaian religious leader (born 1963)

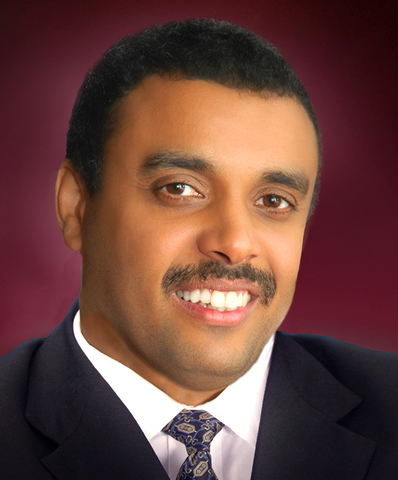
- Heward-Mills in 2006

Personal life
- Born: Dag Heward-Mills; 1963 (age 62–63) London, United Kingdom
- Spouse: Adelaide Mills (m. 1990)
- Children: 4
- Occupation: evangelist, author
- Website: www.daghewardmills.org

Religious life
- Religion: Christianity

Dag Heward-Mills (born 1963) is a Ghanaian Charismatic Christian evangelist, megachurch pastor, author, and international conference speaker based in Accra. He is the founder and presiding Bishop of the Lighthouse Group of Churches. He is also the founder and chancellor of the Anagkazo Bible and Ministry Training Center in the Eastern Region of Ghana.

Heward-Mills's church network has become the object of controversy in both Ghana and Belgium due to allegations of abuse and exploitation.

== Biography ==
Dag Heward-Mills was born on 1963, in London. In 1988, Heward-Mills started Lighthouse Chapel International. By 1991, the church had bought a local cinema hall in Korle-Gonno, where they built their first cathedral.

Heward-Mills founded the Anagkazo Bible and Ministry Training Center (ABMTC). In 2011, Heward-Mills became pastor of First Love Church, which was renamed in 2020 to the United Organization of First Love Churches (UO-FLC 190). In January 2023, he was listed among the "100 Most Reputable Africans" by Reputation Poll International.

== Controversies ==
In 2018, Heward-Mills came into legal conflict with residents of Akuapim-Mampong after blocking major access roads during the construction of a church project. Lighthouse Chapel International was cited for contempt of court.

In 2021, The Fourth Estate, a journalism project related to the Media Foundation for West Africa (MFWA), documented the alleged abuse of former pastors by Lighthouse Chapel International. The abusive practices included the non-payment of SSNIT contributions. Subsequently, Lighthouse filed multiple suits against the media platform.

In 2022, a high court in Accra fined investigative journalist Manasseh Azure and three others after Lighthouse filed a contempt application against them.

In 2026, Belgian investigative journalism program Pano (linked to public broadcaster VRT 1) and De Morgen jointly uncovered various instances of financial exploitation, harassment, and sexual assault of minors in Belgian churches belonging to the Lighthouse network. The investigation also found that the churches systematically targeted a vulnerable and underage public with the goal of putting pressure to raise money from them. This led to the shutting down of these churches in a number of cities.

== Books ==
- The Loyalty and Disloyalty series of ten titles
- Amplify Your Ministry: With Miracles & Manifestations of The Holy Spirit
