= Jamuni McNeace =

American basketball player (born 1996)

No. 8 – Tofaş
- Position: Center
- League: Basketbol Süper Ligi / EuroCup

Personal information
- Born: March 25, 1996 (age 30) Decatur, Illinois, U.S.
- Listed height: 6 ft 10 in (2.08 m)
- Listed weight: 222 lb (101 kg)

Career information
- High school: Allen (Allen, Texas)
- College: Oklahoma (2014–2019)
- NBA draft: 2019: undrafted
- Playing career: 2019–present

Career history
- 2019–2020: Salon Vilpas
- 2020–2021: Crailsheim Merlins
- 2021–2022: Vanoli Cremona
- 2022–2023: Yalovaspor
- 2023–2024: PAOK
- 2024–2026: Cholet Basket
- 2026–present: Tofaş

Jamuni McNeace (born March 25, 1996) is an American professional basketball player for Tofaş of the Basketbol Süper Ligi (BSL) and the EuroCup. He plays the center position. McNeace played college basketball for the Oklahoma Sooners before beginning his professional career in Europe in 2019.

== Early life and high school career ==
McNeace was born in Decatur, Illinois, and attended Allen High School in Allen, Texas. He began playing organized basketball during his sophomore year of high school, having previously played American football. As a senior, he averaged 9.7 points, 10.1 rebounds and 2.3 blocks per game, helping Allen reach the Texas Class 5A state semifinals. He was ranked as the 25th-best center in his recruiting class by 247Sports.

== College career ==
McNeace attended the University of Oklahoma, where he played for the Sooners from 2014 to 2019. After redshirting his first season, he appeared in 27 games during the 2015–16 campaign, when Oklahoma reached the NCAA Final Four.

During the 2016–17 season, McNeace averaged 4.4 points, 3.7 rebounds and 1.2 blocks per game. He improved his production as a junior in 2017–18, averaging 6.8 points and 5.4 rebounds while shooting 67.1 percent from the field.

In his senior season, McNeace averaged 4.7 points and 3.5 rebounds in 30 appearances. His season was affected by a right ankle injury sustained in December 2018. He concluded his college career with 528 points, 431 rebounds and 117 blocked shots in 120 games. At the time of his graduation, he ranked sixth in Oklahoma program history in career blocks. He was also a three-time Academic All-Big 12 First Team selection.

=== College statistics ===
| Season | Team | GP | PPG | RPG | BPG | FG% |
|---|---|---|---|---|---|---|
| 2015–16 | Oklahoma | 27 | 1.2 | 1.4 | 0.3 | .545 |
| 2016–17 | Oklahoma | 31 | 4.4 | 3.7 | 1.2 | .553 |
| 2017–18 | Oklahoma | 32 | 6.8 | 5.4 | 1.4 | .671 |
| 2018–19 | Oklahoma | 30 | 4.7 | 3.5 | 0.8 | .500 |
| Career | | 120 | 4.4 | 3.6 | 1.0 | .579 |

== Professional career ==
=== Salon Vilpas (2019–2020) ===
After going undrafted in the 2019 NBA draft, McNeace began his professional career with Salon Vilpas of the Finnish Korisliiga. During the 2019–20 season, he appeared in 34 league games and averaged approximately 11.9 points, 6.8 rebounds and 1.2 blocks per game. He was selected to the league's season-ending first team.

=== Crailsheim Merlins (2020–2021) ===
In August 2020, McNeace joined the Crailsheim Merlins of the German Basketball Bundesliga. He played in 33 games during the 2020–21 season, averaging 8.9 points and 4.5 rebounds per game.

=== Vanoli Cremona (2021–2022) ===
McNeace moved to Italy for the 2021–22 season, signing with Vanoli Cremona of the Lega Basket Serie A. He averaged approximately 7.1 points and 5.5 rebounds across 26 league appearances.

=== Yalovaspor (2022–2023) ===
For the 2022–23 season, McNeace joined Yalovaspor of the Turkish second division. He appeared in 39 games, averaging 11.7 points, 7.1 rebounds and 1.5 blocks per game. The club reached the league's playoff final during his tenure.

=== PAOK (2023–2024) ===
On July 27, 2023, McNeace signed with PAOK of the Greek Basket League for the 2023–24 season.

During his season in Greece, he averaged approximately 9.6 points and 6.3 rebounds per game in domestic league competition. He also made his debut in the Basketball Champions League, averaging 10.0 points and 6.2 rebounds in five appearances.

=== Cholet Basket (2024–2026) ===
On July 2, 2024, McNeace signed with Cholet Basket of the French LNB Élite.

During the 2024–25 season, he helped Cholet reach the semifinals of the 2024–25 FIBA Europe Cup. He averaged 10.7 points and 5.7 rebounds in 13 games in the competition. Cholet was eliminated in the semifinals by McNeace's former club PAOK, losing the two-legged series by an aggregate score of 178–177.

McNeace remained with Cholet for the 2025–26 season, averaging 10.3 points and 5.2 rebounds in 34 French league games. In the 2025–26 Basketball Champions League, he averaged 11.1 points and 4.4 rebounds across eight appearances.

=== Tofaş (2026–present) ===
In June 2026, McNeace agreed to join Tofaş of the Turkish Basketbol Süper Ligi for the 2026–27 season. He also joined the club for its participation in the EuroCup.

== Career statistics ==
Statistics are per-game averages. Professional figures below combine recorded competitions for each season rather than representing domestic league play exclusively.

| Season | Club | GP | MPG | PPG | RPG | APG | BPG |
|---|---|---|---|---|---|---|---|
| 2019–20 | Salon Vilpas | 34 | 25.4 | 11.9 | 6.8 | 1.6 | 1.2 |
| 2020–21 | Crailsheim | 33 | 17.9 | 8.9 | 4.5 | 0.2 | 0.6 |
| 2021–22 | Cremona | 26 | 19.6 | 7.1 | 5.5 | 0.6 | 0.9 |
| 2022–23 | Yalovaspor | 39 | 25.7 | 11.7 | 7.1 | 1.1 | 1.5 |
| 2023–24 | PAOK | 26 | 22.3 | 9.9 | 6.5 | 0.6 | 1.0 |
| 2024–25 | Cholet | 43 | 18.6 | 9.0 | 4.5 | 0.7 | 0.6 |
| 2025–26 | Cholet | 45 | 21.4 | 10.5 | 5.0 | 0.8 | 0.6 |

2026–27 statistics are excluded because the season is ongoing.
