= Mohammed Sanogo =

Ivorian pastor, author and missionary

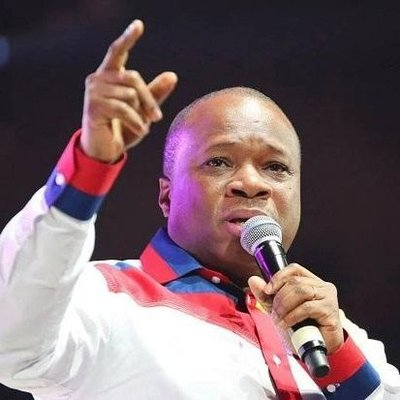
Mohammed Sanogo

Mohammed Yeregnan Sanogo (born 30 April 1974, Nogent-sur-Marne) is an Ivorian pastor, author and missionary from Ivory Coast. Married to Lilliane Sanogo since in 2000, he is the founder and general overseer of the Messages De Vie (Messages of Life) Ministry and of Vases d'honneur Church, based in Abidjan. He is considered as a "prototype of the modern Pentecostal prophet".

== Megachurch in Abidjan ==
After growing up in a Muslim family, Mohammed Sanogo converted to Christianity at the age of 15. He completed his graduate studies in order to be a surveyor. Then he turned to full-time ministry within Ivorian Pentecostalism. He is among the main promoters of an Evangelical revival that started in Ivory Coast in the 1990s. At the opposite of politicized prophecies which compromised many Evangelical and Charismatic leaders during the violent post-election crisis of 2010–2011, Sanogo remained away from politics, focusing instead on making converts, teaching, and writing books. His main church, Vases d'Honneur (Abidjan, Cocody), became a megachurch, and developed a large network of branches. He has been interviewed as a pastor in 2014 by the major French-speaking radio network RFI (Radio France Internationale) as an advocate of religious balance, pleading against authoritarian and "guru-like" leadership.

== Missions in Africa ==
Since the 2010s, Vases d'Honneur became one of the main flagships of revivalism in French-speaking Ivory Coast. Since 2014, through the "Impact Nation" initiative, Sanogo leads regularly evangelism actions in West and Central Africa, combined with social actions to assist the needy (distribution of food, household materials, free medical care programs, etc.). From 10 to 27 November 2021, he developed a spectacular campaign in Liberia, including preaching in Ganta, Kakata, Monrovia, Tubmanburg, but also donating a consignment of medical supplies and equipment "worth about US$196,867 to the Government of Liberia (GOL), through the Ministry of Health".
