= Ismael Sanogo =

Ivorian-American basketball player (born 1997)

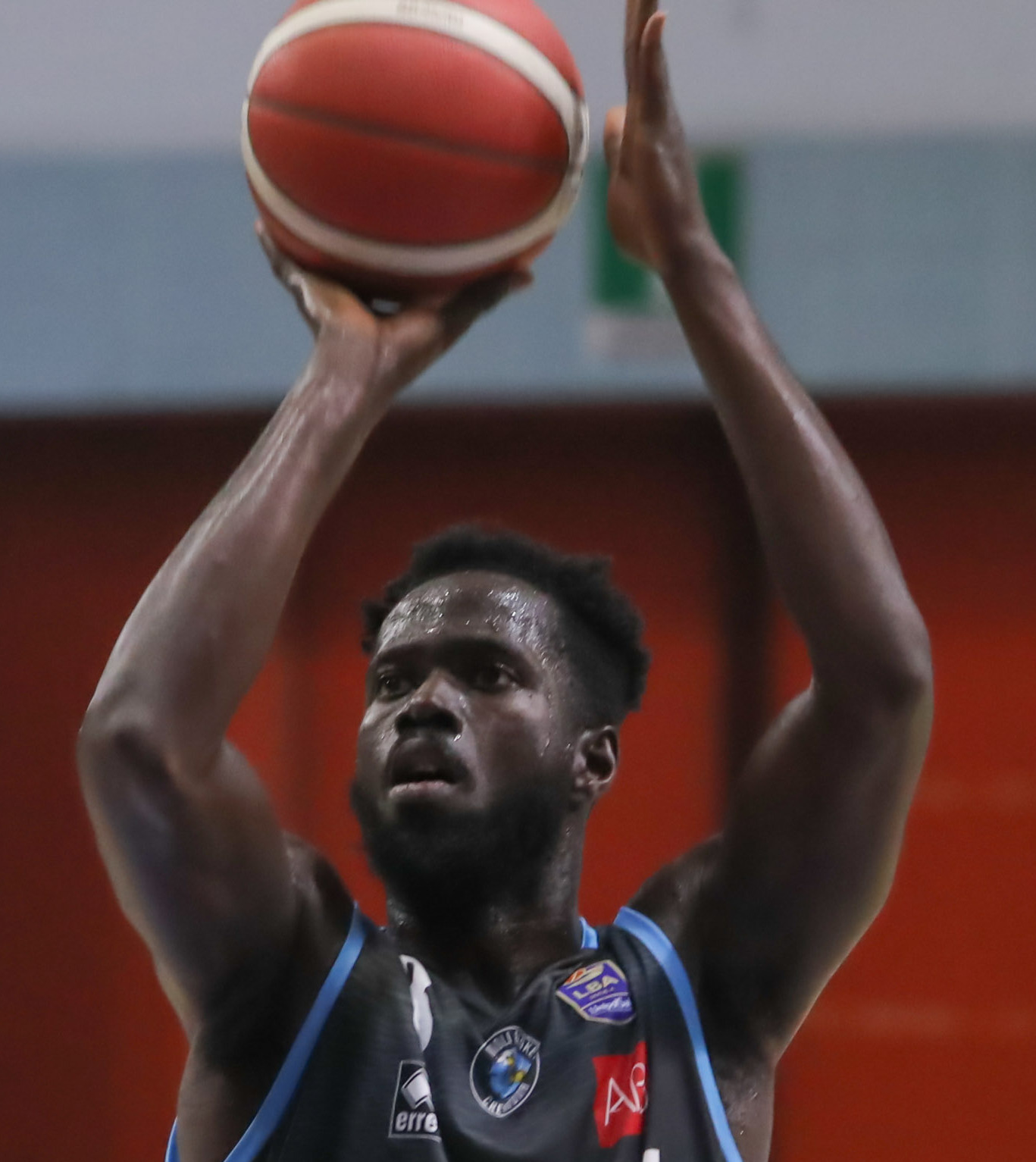
- Sanogo in action with Vanoli Cremona

Free agent
- Position: Power forward / center

Personal information
- Born: July 16, 1996 (age 30) Ivory Coast
- Listed height: 6 ft 7 in (2.01 m)
- Listed weight: 209 lb (95 kg)

Career information
- High school: East Side (Newark, New Jersey)
- College: Seton Hall (2014–2018)
- NBA draft: 2018: undrafted
- Playing career: 2018–present

Career history
- 2018–2020: Long Island Nets
- 2021–2022: Vanoli Cremona
- 2022–2024: Aris Thessaloniki
- 2024–2025: Maroussi

Ismael Sanogo (born July 16, 1996) is an Ivorian professional basketball player who last played for Maroussi of the Greek Basketball League. He plays at the power forward and center positions. He played college basketball for Seton Hall.

== High school and college career ==
Sanogo played for East Side High School in Newark, New Jersey. From 2014 until 2018, he played college basketball for Seton Hall. On 22 December 2017, Sanogo was suspended from Seton Hall for violating team and school rules.

== Professional career ==
After failing to be drafted in the 2018 NBA draft, Sanogo joined Long Island Nets. After his first year with the Nets, Sanogo was waived on November 5, 2019. He was reacquired by the Nets on December 12, 2019.

On June 6, 2021, Sanogo joined Vanoli Cremona in Italy.

On August 21, 2022, Sanogo joined Aris of the Greek Basket League. He stayed with the team for two years. During his tenure with the team, he was regarded as one of the best defenders of the team.

After his two-year stint with Aris, Sanogo joined Maroussi of the Greek Basket League, signing a two-year deal.
