= Gorilla F.C. (Rwanda) =

Football team in the Rwandan Premier League

- Full name: Gorilla Football Club
- Ground: Kigali Pelé Stadium; Kigali, Rwanda
- Capacity: 22,000
- Manager: Alain Kirasa
- League: Rwanda Premier League
- 2025–26: 11th
Home colours

Gorilla Football Club is an association football club based in Kigali, Rwanda. The team currently competes in the Rwanda Premier League, and plays its home games at the Kigali Pele Stadium.
