= Rosa Whitaker =

American business woman

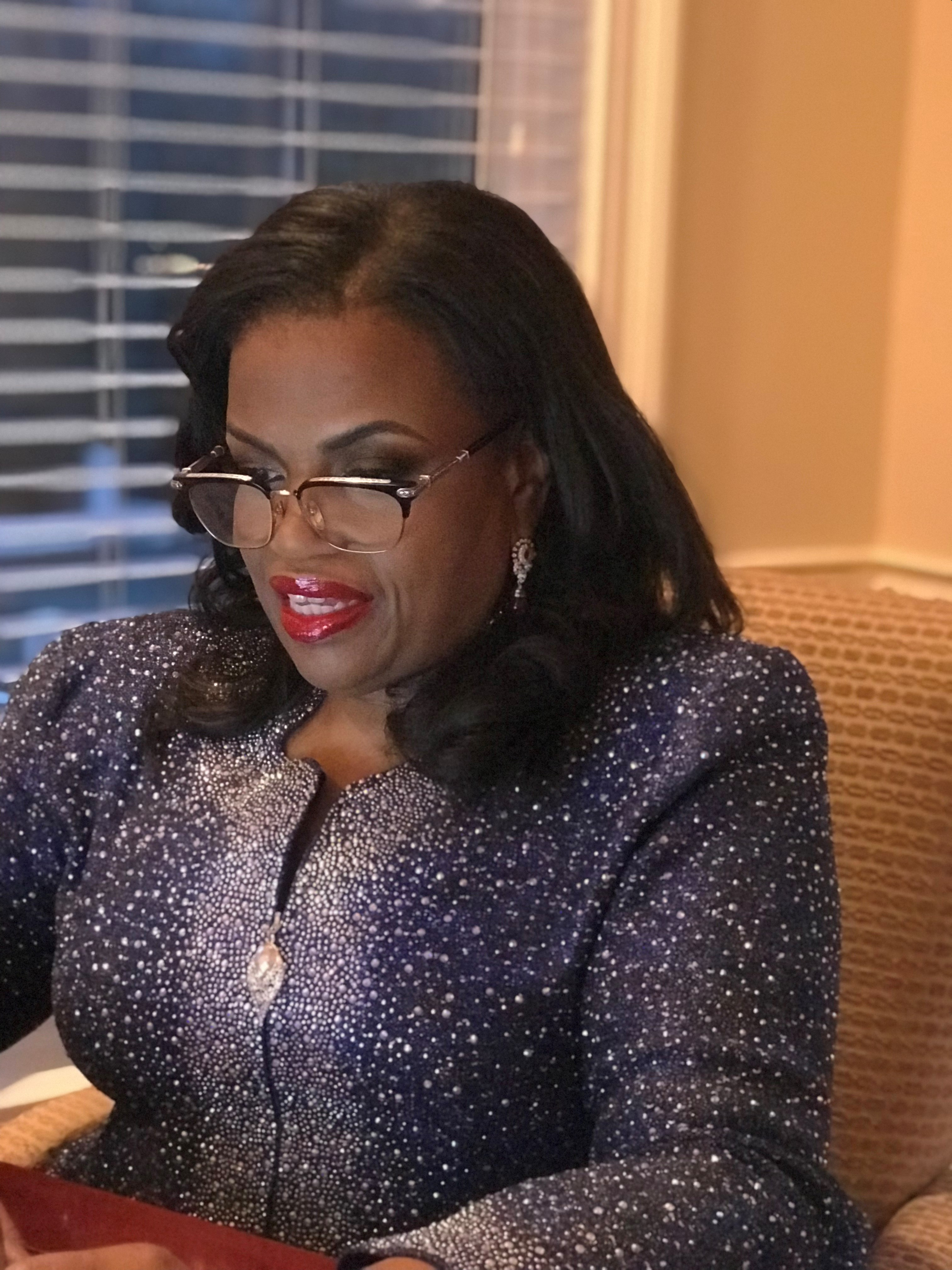
- Whitaker in 2019
- Education: American University, Washington, D.C.
- Occupations: CEO and President of the Whitaker Group
- Spouse: Archbishop Nicholas Duncan-Williams (m. 2008)

Rosa Whitaker Duncan-Williams is an American lobbyist and former trade negotiator who served as the first Assistant US Trade Representative for Africa in the administrations of Presidents Bill Clinton and George W. Bush. She now runs a consulting firm, The Whitaker Group.

== Early life ==
Whitaker was born in Washington, D.C., and holds Master's and bachelor's degrees from American University in Washington, D.C., and studied in the United Kingdom and Italy as well at the Foreign Service Institute.

== Government career ==
While serving as a Senior Trade Advisor to Congressman Charlie Rangel, Whitaker helped write the African Growth and Opportunity Act (AGOA), which was enacted in 2000. AGOA, America’s first comprehensive trade law towards Africa, remains the basis of US economic policy towards Africa. It has delivered billions of dollars in duty-free products from Africa into the US market annually while also generating jobs and investments across the continent.

Whitaker also co-founded and co-chaired the bipartisan advocacy group, AGOA Action Coalition, with Jack Kemp.

== The Whitaker Group ==
Whitaker launched The Whitaker Group after leaving USTR in 2003. The Whitaker Group, based in Northern Virginia and Accra, Ghana, advises clients on transactions and strategy for trade, investment, and project development across Africa. Founded in 2003, TWG has attracted clients from among Fortune 500 companies interested in both commercial and human development in Africa.

In 2017, Whitaker led TWG into its first direct investment in Africa, acquiring shares and management control of Dominion TV – a Pan-African television, entertainment and multimedia company that broadcast in 48 African countries on DStv, Africa’s largest satellite platform.

The firm has worked for the authoritarian Faure Gnassingbé regime in Togo.

== Awards and recognition ==
- Whitaker is a recipient of numerous awards and honors, including the 2021 Women in International Trade’s Business Legacy Award and Foreign Policy magazine’s Top 100 Global Thinkers in 2010. Other awards and honors include:
- GUBA 2019 “Excellence in Africa Advancement” Award
- The Africa Report Magazine’s “20 Most Influential Africa Lobbyists” in 2014
- Face2Face Africa Africa Trailblazer Award (2016)
- "Rosa Whitaker Day" proclaimed by Rep. Charles Rangel, July 9, 2016
- Africa Economic Builders Award (2014)
- In 2025, Whitaker was recognized as an innovator in global business promoting African excellence by Reputable Poll International (RPI)
