= 2012 Kagame Interclub Cup =

CECAFA Club Cup

Tournament details
- Host country: Tanzania
- Dates: 14–28 July 2012
- Teams: 11 (from 9 associations)

Final positions
- Champions: (Tanzania) Young Africans (5th title)
- Runners-up: (Tanzania) Azam
- Third place: (Democratic Republic of the Congo) Vita Club
- Fourth place: (Rwanda) A.P.R.

Tournament statistics
- Matches played: 23
- Goals scored: 77 (3.35 per match)
- Top scorer(s): (Tanzania) Said Bahanunzi (7 goals)

The 2012 Kagame Interclub Cup was the 37th edition of the Kagame Interclub Cup, which is organised by CECAFA. It began on 14 July and ended on 28 July 2012. Tanzania hosted the tournament for their eleventh time since it officially began in 1974, when they were also hosts. The tournament made Wau Salaam the first South Sudanese club to take part in an international club tournament.

Defending champions Young Africans picked up their fifth title of the competition after beating fellow Tanzanians Azam in the final.

== Broadcasting ==
SuperSport secured official rights to broadcast all games played in the tournament. They used their SS9 (SuperSport 9) and SS9E (SuperSport 9 East) channels.

== Participants ==
On 29 June 2012, the draw for clubs to participate in the tournament was released. Young Africans, the winning team, received a cash prize of US$ 30,000, while the runners-up and third-placed teams, Azam and Vita Club respectively, received cash prizes US$ 20,000 and US$ 10,000 respectively. The budget of the tournament is said to be around US$ 600,000. Matches are being played at the Benjamin Mkapa National Stadium in Dar es Salaam and the Azam Stadium in Chamazi.

The following 11 clubs took part in the competition:

Group A

- (Djibouti) Port
- (Tanzania) Simba
- (Uganda) U.R.A.
- (Democratic Republic of the Congo) Vita Club (invited guests)

Group B

- (Tanzania) Azam
- (Zanzibar) Mafunzo
- (Kenya) Tusker

Group C

- (Rwanda) A.P.R.
- (Burundi) Atlético Olympic
- (South Sudan) Wau Salaam
- (Tanzania) Young Africans

== Match officials ==
CECAFA appointed 15 officials to participate in the tournament.

Referees

- (Burundi) Thierry Nkurunziza
- (Djibouti) Farah Aden
- (Kenya) Anthony Ogwayo
- (Rwanda) Issa Kagabo
- (Tanzania) Israel Mujuni
- (Uganda) Dennis Batte
- (Zanzibar) Waziri Sheha

Assistant referees

- (Djibouti) Abdulahi Mahamoud
- (Kenya) Elias Kuloba
- (Kenya) Peter Sabatia
- (Rwanda) Simba Honore
- (Tanzania) Hamis Changwalu
- (Tanzania) Jesse Erasmo
- (Uganda) Musa Balikoowa
- (Zanzibar) Josephat Bulali

== Group stage ==
The group stage featured 11 teams, with 4 teams in Group A and Group C and 3 in Group B. The matchdays were 14–15, 17–18, 19, 20 and 21 July.

If two or more teams are equal on points on completion of the group matches, the following criteria are applied to determine the rankings (in descending order):

1. Number of points obtained in games between the teams involved;
2. Goal difference in games between the teams involved;
3. Goals scored in games between the teams involved;
4. Away goals scored in games between the teams involved;
5. Goal difference in all games;
6. Goals scored in all games;
7. Drawing of lots.

Nine CECAFA associations were represented in the group stage: Tanzania by three clubs and Burundi, Congo DR, Djibouti, Kenya, Rwanda, South Sudan, Uganda and Zanzibar.

=== Group A ===
Team	Pld	W	D	L	GF	GA	GD	Pts
(Uganda) U.R.A.	3	3	0	0	8	2	+6	9
(Democratic Republic of the Congo) Vita Club	3	1	1	1	9	4	+5	4
(Tanzania) Simba	3	1	1	1	4	3	+1	4
(Djibouti) Port	3	0	0	3	1	13	−12	0

15 July 2012
14:00 UTC+3

Vita Club (Democratic Republic of the Congo)	7–0	(Djibouti) Port
Rogombe 21'; Etekiama 24', 30', 74', 84' (pen.); Ngudikama 34'; Makola 69'	Report

Azam Stadium
Referee: Israel Mujuni (Tanzania)

15 July 2012
16:00 UTC+3

Simba (Tanzania)	0–2	(Uganda) U.R.A.
	Report	Ali 12', 90+2'

Benjamin Mkapa National Stadium
Referee: Issa Kagabo (Rwanda)

18 July 2012
14:00 UTC+3

Vita Club (Democratic Republic of the Congo)	1–3	(Uganda) U.R.A.
Mutombo 60'	Report	Bagala 66'; Ssekisambu 79'; Ssentongo 89'

Benjamin Mkapa National Stadium
Referee: Waziri Sheha (Zanzibar)

18 July 2012
16:00 UTC+3

Port (Djibouti)	0–3	(Tanzania) Simba
	Report	Juma 62', 73'; Sunzu 65' (pen.)

Benjamin Mkapa National Stadium
Referee: Dennis Batte (Uganda)

20 July 2012
14:00 UTC+3

Port (Djibouti)	1–3	(Uganda) U.R.A.
Agbor 70'	Report	Nsumba 24'; Mubiru 39'; Ssentongo 57'

Benjamin Mkapa National Stadium
Referee: Ibada Kibo (Zanzibar)

21 July 2012
16:00 UTC+3

Simba (Tanzania)	1–1	(Democratic Republic of the Congo) Vita Club
Moshi	Report 1 Report 2	Etekiama 34'

Benjamin Mkapa National Stadium
Referee: Anthony Ogwayo (Kenya)

=== Group B ===
Team	Pld	W	D	L	GF	GA	GD	Pts
(Tanzania) Azam	2	0	2	0	1	1	0	2 (Note: Tiebreakers: Azam, Mafunzo and Tusker are all tied on points as shown above, but Azam and Mafunzo are ranked ahead of Tusker because of having more goals scored in the group, and Azam is ranked higher than Mafunzo because, since all of their criteria are the same, the first letter on their team name (A) is higher in the alphabet.)
(Zanzibar) Mafunzo	2	0	2	0	1	1	0	2
(Kenya) Tusker	2	0	2	0	0	0	0	2

Notes:

15 July 2012
16:00 UTC+3

Azam (Tanzania)	1–1	(Zanzibar) Mafunzo
Bocco 27'	Report	Hassan 46'

Azam Stadium
Referee: Thierry Nkurunziza (Burundi)

19 July 2012
16:00 UTC+3

Mafunzo (Zanzibar)	0–0	(Kenya) Tusker
	Report

Benjamin Mkapa National Stadium
Referee: Thierry Nkurunziza (Burundi)

21 July 2012
14:00 UTC+3

Azam (Tanzania)	0–0	(Kenya) Tusker
	Report

Benjamin Mkapa National Stadium
Referee: Issa Kagabo (Rwanda)

=== Group C ===
Team	Pld	W	D	L	GF	GA	GD	Pts
(Burundi) Atlético Olympic	3	2	1	0	7	0	+7	7
(Tanzania) Young Africans	3	2	0	1	9	3	+6	6
(Rwanda) A.P.R.	3	1	1	1	7	2	+5	4
(South Sudan) Wau Salaam	3	0	0	3	1	19	−18	0

14 July 2012
14:00 UTC+3

A.P.R. (Rwanda)	7–0	(South Sudan) Wau Salaam
Saint-Preux 15' (pen.), 53'; Ndikumana 24'; Karekezi 40'; Mugiraneza 48', 77'; Mubumbyi 57'	Report 1 Report 2

Benjamin Mkapa National Stadium
Referee: Anthony Ogwayo (Kenya)

14 July 2012
16:00 UTC+3

Young Africans (Tanzania)	0–2	(Burundi) Atlético Olympic
	Report 1 Report 2 (in Swahili)	Kavumbagu 82'; Ndikumana 90'

Benjamin Mkapa National Stadium
Referee: Dennis Batte (Uganda)

17 July 2012
14:00 UTC+3

Atlético Olympic (Burundi)	0–0	(Rwanda) A.P.R.
	Report

Benjamin Mkapa National Stadium
Referee: Ibada Kibo (Zanzibar)

17 July 2012
16:00 UTC+3

Wau Salaam (South Sudan)	1–7	(Tanzania) Young Africans
Ulama 90+2'	Report	Bahanunzi 12', 17'; Kizza 18', 27', 30', 35'; Khalfan 72'

Benjamin Mkapa National Stadium
Referee: Issa Kagabo (Rwanda)

19 July 2012
14:00 UTC+3

Atlético Olympic (Burundi)	5–0	(South Sudan) Wau Salaam
Gateretse 2'; Ciza 38'; Nsabiyumwa 48'; Nimubona 55'; Ndayisenga 57'	Report

Benjamin Mkapa National Stadium
Referee: Israel Mujuni (Tanzania)

20 July 2012
16:00 UTC+3

Young Africans (Tanzania)	2–0	(Rwanda) A.P.R.
Bahanunzi 23', 68'	Report

Benjamin Mkapa National Stadium
Referee: Dennis Batte (Uganda)

== Knockout stage ==
The knockout stage involved the eight teams which advanced from the group stage: the top three teams from Group A and Group C and the top two from Group B.

In this stage, teams play against each other once. The losers of the semi-finals play against each other in the third place playoff where the winners are placed third overall in the entire competition and receive US$ 10,000. The winners of the final receive US$30,000 and the runners-up US$20,000.

=== Bracket ===
Quarter-finals
23 July
(Uganda) U.R.A.	1
(Rwanda) A.P.R.	2
23 July
(Zanzibar) Mafunzo	1 (3)
(Tanzania) Young Africans	1 (5)
24 July
(Burundi) Atlético Olympic	1
(Democratic Republic of the Congo) Vita Club	2
24 July
(Tanzania) Azam	3
(Tanzania) Simba	1

Semi-finals
26 July
(Rwanda) A.P.R.	0
(Tanzania) Young Africans	1
26 July
(Democratic Republic of the Congo) Vita Club	1
(Tanzania) Azam	2

Final
28 July
(Tanzania) Young Africans	2
(Tanzania) Azam	0
Third place
28 July
(Rwanda) A.P.R.	1
(Democratic Republic of the Congo) Vita Club	2

=== Quarter-finals ===
The quarter-finals were played on 23–24 July 2012.

Team 1	Score	Team 2
Uganda Revenue Authority	1–2	(Rwanda) Armée Patriotique Rwandaise
Mafunzo (Zanzibar)	1–1 (3–5 p)	(Tanzania) Young Africans
Atlético Olympic (Burundi)	1–2	(Democratic Republic of the Congo) Association Sportive Vita Club
Azam (Tanzania)	3–1	(Tanzania) Simba

In the first quarter-final, Uganda Revenue Authority, who had lost the 2008 final in to Tusker, faced Armée Patriotique Rwandaise, who had already beaten them 2–1 five years earlier to clinch the title in 2007. The latter won the match 2–1. Mafunzo, in the second quarter-final, were beaten 5–3 on penalties by Young Africans, who are seeking their fifth title in the competition, after the match ended in a 1–1 stalemate after 90 minutes.

Atlético Olympic, making their first appearance at the tournament as only the second Burundian club ever to participate, were edged out 2–1 in the third quarter-final by Vita Club, also competing for their first time. Azam completed a surprise upset in the fourth quarter-final over six-time champions and fellow Tanzanians Simba, beating them 3–1 to advance to the semi-finals.

23 July 2012
14:00 UTC+3

U.R.A. (Uganda)	1–2	(Rwanda) A.P.R.
Ssentongo 57'	Report	Iranzi 10'; Ndikumana 34'

Benjamin Mkapa National Stadium
Referee: Israel Mujuni (Tanzania)

23 July 2012
16:00 UTC+3

Mafunzo (Zanzibar)	1–1 (90 min.)	(Tanzania) Young Africans
Mbanga 34'	Report	Bahanunzi 46'
Penalties
Shebe (penalty scored); Shabaan (penalty missed); Abdulrahim (penalty scored); Jaku (penalty scored)	3–5	Bahanunzi (penalty scored); Haroub (penalty scored); Kizza (penalty scored); Niyonzima (penalty scored); Idd (penalty scored)

Benjamin Mkapa National Stadium
Referee: Thierry Nkurunziza (Burundi)

24 July 2012
14:00 UTC+3

Atlético Olympic (Burundi)	1–2	(Democratic Republic of the Congo) Vita Club
Kwizera 47'	Report	Etekiama 6'; Makola 90'

Benjamin Mkapa National Stadium
Referee: Dennis Batte (Uganda)

24 July 2012
16:00 UTC+3

Azam (Tanzania)	3–1	(Tanzania) Simba
Bocco 17', 46', 73'	Report 1 Report 2	Kapombe 53'

Benjamin Mkapa National Stadium
Referee: Issa Kagabo (Rwanda)

=== Semi-finals ===
The semi-finals will be played on 26 July 2012.

Team 1	Score	Team 2
Association Sportive Vita Club (Democratic Republic of the Congo)	1–2	(Tanzania) Azam
Armée Patriotique Rwandaise (Rwanda)	0–1	(Tanzania) Young Africans

In the first semi-final Vita Club will be up against Azam, both of whom have performed impressively for newcomers in this year's competition, having reached the semi-finals ahead of more experienced clubs.

Armée Patriotique Rwandaise will face Young Africans for a second time in the tournament, having lost 2–0 to them in the group stage.

26 July 2012
14:00 UTC+3

Vita Club (Democratic Republic of the Congo)	1–2	(Tanzania) Azam
Mfongang 35'	Report	Bocco 68'; Ngassa 88'

Benjamin Mkapa National Stadium
Referee: Dennis Batte (Uganda)

26 July 2012
16:00 UTC+3

A.P.R. (Rwanda)	0–1	(Tanzania) Young Africans
	Report	Kizza 90+10'

Benjamin Mkapa National Stadium
Referee: Anthony Ogwayo (Kenya)

=== Third place playoff ===
The third place playoff was played on 28 July 2012, right before the final.

28 July 2012
14:00 UTC+3

A.P.R. (Rwanda)	1–2	(Democratic Republic of the Congo) Vita Club
Mugiraneza 89'	Report	Mapanda 19'; Mutombo 69'

Benjamin Mkapa National Stadium
Referee: Anthony Ogwayo (Kenya)

=== Final ===
The final was played on 28 July 2012, right after the third place playoff. To reach the final, in the knockout stage Azam defeated six-time champions Simba and Vita Club, while Young Africans eliminated Mafunzo and Armée Patriotique Rwandaise, whom they had already beaten in the group stage.

Azam, making their first ever appearance at the tournament, were the fifth team from Tanzania to reach the final and the fourth to reach the final with Tanzania as the hosts, the last being defending champions Young Africans in 1986. The match was also the third final in which both finalists were from Tanzania, and the second final hosted by Tanzania in which both finalists were from Tanzania.

28 July 2012
16:00 UTC+3

Young Africans (Tanzania)	2–0	(Tanzania) Azam
Kizza 44'; Bahanunzi 90+3'	Report 1 Report 2

Benjamin Mkapa National Stadium
Referee: Thierry Nkurunziza (Burundi)

Young Africans	Azam

GK	1	(Tanzania) Ally Mustapha
RB	3	(Tanzania) Stephano Mwasika
CB	4	(Tanzania) Oscar Joshua
CB	23	(Tanzania) Nadir Haroub (c)
LB	5	(Tanzania) Kelvin Yondan
CM	24	(Tanzania) Athuman Idd
CM	16	(Tanzania) Rashid Gumbo	(substituted off) 74'
CM	8	(Rwanda) Haruna Niyonzima
SS	29	(Tanzania) David Luhende
CF	11	(Tanzania) Said Bahanunzi
CF	20	(Uganda) Hamis Kizza
Substitutions:
MF	13	(Tanzania) Juma Seif	(substituted on) 74'
Manager:
(Belgium) Tom Saintfiet

GK	27	(Tanzania) Deogratius Munishi
RB	21	(Kenya) Ibrahim Shikanda	(substituted off) 69'
CB	6	(Tanzania) Erasto Nyoni
CB	13	(Tanzania) Aggrey Morris (c)
LB	15	(Tanzania) Said Moradi
DM	30	(Tanzania) Ramadhani Chombo
CM	4	(Tanzania) Ibrahim Mwaipopo
CM	25	(Tanzania) Jabir Stima
SS	8	(Tanzania) Salum Salum
CF	10	(Ivory Coast) Kipre Tchetche	(substituted off) 67'
CF	19	(Tanzania) John Bocco
Substitutions:
FW	16	(Tanzania) Mrisho Ngassa	(substituted on) 67'
DF	11	(Tanzania) Samir Nuhu	(substituted on) 69'
Manager:
(England) Stewart Hall

Match rules

- 90 minutes.
- Penalty shoot-out if scores still level.
- Seven named substitutes.
- Maximum of three substitutions.

== Top scorers ==
A total of 77 goals was scored by 46 different players in the entire tournament.

Rank	Name	Team	Goals
1	(Tanzania) Said Bahanunzi	(Tanzania) Young Africans	7
2	(Rwanda) Tady Etekiama	(Democratic Republic of the Congo) Association Sportive Vita Club	6
2	(Uganda) Hamis Kizza	(Tanzania) Young Africans	6
4	(Tanzania) John Bocco	(Tanzania) Azam	5
5	(Rwanda) Jean-Baptiste Mugiraneza	(Rwanda) Armée Patriotique Rwandaise	3
5	(Uganda) Robert Ssentongo	Uganda Revenue Authority	3
7	(Burundi) Selemani Ndikumana	(Rwanda) Armée Patriotique Rwandaise	2
7	(Haiti) Leonel Saint-Preux	(Rwanda) Armée Patriotique Rwandaise	2
7	(Democratic Republic of the Congo) Basilua Makola	(Democratic Republic of the Congo) Association Sportive Vita Club	2
7	(Democratic Republic of the Congo) Kazadi Mutombo	(Democratic Republic of the Congo) Association Sportive Vita Club	2
7	(Tanzania) Abdalla Juma	(Tanzania) Simba	2
7	(Uganda) Feni Ali	Uganda Revenue Authority	2
13	(Rwanda) Jean-Claude Iranzi	(Rwanda) Armée Patriotique Rwandaise	1
13	(Rwanda) Olivier Karekezi	(Rwanda) Armée Patriotique Rwandaise	1
13	(Rwanda) Barnabe Mubumbyi	(Rwanda) Armée Patriotique Rwandaise	1
13	(Cameroon) Ayuk Roland Agbor	(Djibouti) Association Sportive du Port	1
13	(Democratic Republic of the Congo) Magola Mapanda	(Democratic Republic of the Congo) Association Sportive Vita Club	1
13	(Cameroon) Alfred Mfongang	(Democratic Republic of the Congo) Association Sportive Vita Club	1
13	(Democratic Republic of the Congo) Emmanuel Ngudikama	(Democratic Republic of the Congo) Association Sportive Vita Club	1
13	(Gabon) Romaric Rogombé	(Democratic Republic of the Congo) Association Sportive Vita Club	1
13	(Burundi) Hussein Ciza	(Burundi) Atlético Olympic	1
13	(Burundi) Divin Gateretse	(Burundi) Atlético Olympic	1
13	(Burundi) Didier Kavumbagu	(Burundi) Atlético Olympic	1
13	(Burundi) Pierre Kwizera	(Burundi) Atlético Olympic	1
13	(Burundi) Kevin Ndayisenga	(Burundi) Atlético Olympic	1
13	(Burundi) Olivier Ndikumana	(Burundi) Atlético Olympic	1
13	(Burundi) Emery Nimubona	(Burundi) Atlético Olympic	1
13	(Burundi) Frederick Nsabiyumwa	(Burundi) Atlético Olympic	1
13	(Tanzania) Mrisho Ngassa	(Tanzania) Azam	1
13	(Zanzibar) Mohamed Abdulrahim	(Zanzibar) Mafunzo	1
13	(Zanzibar) Ali Juma Hassan	(Zanzibar) Mafunzo	1
13	(Zanzibar) Juma Jaku	(Zanzibar) Mafunzo	1
13	(Zanzibar) Ally Othman Mbanga	(Zanzibar) Mafunzo	1
13	(Zanzibar) Salum Said Shebe	(Zanzibar) Mafunzo	1
13	(Tanzania) Shomari Kapombe	(Tanzania) Simba	1
13	(Tanzania) Haruna Moshi	(Tanzania) Simba	1
13	(Zambia) Felix Sunzu	(Tanzania) Simba	1
13	(Uganda) Sula Bagala	Uganda Revenue Authority	1
13	(Uganda) Samuel Mubiru	Uganda Revenue Authority	1
13	(Uganda) Augustine Nsumba	Uganda Revenue Authority	1
13	(Uganda) Erias Ssekisambu	Uganda Revenue Authority	1
13	(South Sudan) Khamis Deshama Ulama	(South Sudan) Wau Salaam	1
13	(Tanzania) Nadir Haroub	(Tanzania) Young Africans	1
13	(Tanzania) Athuman Idd	(Tanzania) Young Africans	1
13	(Tanzania) Nizar Khalfan	(Tanzania) Young Africans	1
13	(Rwanda) Haruna Niyonzima	(Tanzania) Young Africans	1

== See also ==
- 2012 CECAFA Cup
