= 2021 Kagame Interclub Cup =

CECAFA Kagame Cup

Tournament details
- Host country: Tanzania
- Dates: 1–14 August 2021
- Teams: 8 (from 12 associations)
- Venues: 2 (in 1 host city)

Final positions
- Champions: (Uganda) Express FC (1st title)
- Runners-up: (Malawi) Big Bullets FC
- Third place: (Zanzibar) KMKM FC
- Fourth place: (Tanzania) Azam FC

Tournament statistics
- Matches played: 16
- Goals scored: 32 (2 per match)
- Top scorer(s): (Tanzania) Paul Peter (Azam FC) (Uganda) Muzamiru Mutyaba (Express FC) (Uganda) Eric Kambale (Express FC) (3 goals each)
- All statistics correct as of 3 July 2024.

The 2021 CECAFA Kagame Interclub Cup was 43rd edition of the Kagame Interclub Cup, a football competition for clubs in East and Central Africa, which is organised by CECAFA. It took place in Tanzania from 1 to 14 August 2021.

== Participants clubs ==
The following eight teams will contest in the tournament.

Team	Appearances	Previous best performance
(Tanzania) Azam FC	7th	Champions (2015, 2018)
(South Sudan) Atlabara FC	4th	Quarter-finals (2014)
(Malawi) Big Bullets FC	Debut	n/a
(Uganda) Express FC	13th	Runner-up (1994, 1995)
(Uganda) KCCA FC	10th	Champions (1997, 2019)
(Zanzibar) KMKM FC	11th	Third place (1983)
(Burundi) Messager FC Ngozi	Debut	n/a
(Tanzania) Young Africans FC	20th	Champions (1997, 1993, 1999, 2011, 2012)

== Venues ==
The following two venues hosted for the matches of the tournament.

Dar es Salam	Dar es Salam is located in Tanzania	Dar es Salam
B. Mkapa Stadium	Dar es Salam is located in Tanzania	Azam Complex Stadium
Capacity: 60,000	Dar es Salam is located in Tanzania	Capacity: 10,000

== Draw ==
The draw ceremony of the tournament were held on 28 July 2021 at Dar es Salam, Tanzania. Total eight team were divided into two groups.

== Group summary ==
Group A	Group B
(Tanzania) Young Africans SC (Malawi) Big Bullets FC (Uganda) Express FC (South Sudan) Atlabara FC	(Uganda) KCCA FC (Tanzania) Azam FC (Burundi) Messager Ngozi FC (Zanzibar) KMKM FC

== Match officials ==
Referees

- Georges Gatogato (Burundi)
- Thierry Nkurunziza (Burundi)
- Mfaume Nassoro (Zanzibar)
- Elly Ally Sasii (Tanzania)
- William Oloya (Uganda)
- (South Sudan) Ring Malong (South Sudan)

Assistant Referees

- Mohamed Mkono (Tanzania)
- Frank Komba (Tanzania)
- Soud Iddi Lila (Tanzania)
- Willy Habimana (Burundi)
- Désiré Nkurunziza (Burundi)
- (South Sudan) Gasim Muder Dehiya (South Sudan)
- (South Sudan) Duwuki Robert Henry (South Sudan)
- Ronald Katenya (Uganda)

== Group stage ==
Tie-breaking criteria for group play
The ranking of teams in each group was based on the following criteria:
1. Number of points obtained in games between the teams involved
2. Goal difference in games between the teams involved
3. Goals scored in games between the teams involved
4. Away goals scored in games between the teams involved
5. Goal difference in all games
6. Goals scored in all games
7. Drawing of lots

Key to colour in group tables
The top finisher in each group will qualify for the Knockout-stage

=== Group A ===
Pos	Team	Pld	W	D	L	GF	GA	GD	Pts	Qualification
1	(Uganda) Express FC	3	2	1	0	5	2	+3	7	Advanced to Knockout stage
2	(Malawi) Big Bullets FC	3	1	2	0	4	2	+2	5	Advanced to Knockout stage
3	(Tanzania) Young Africans SC (H)	3	0	2	1	2	4	−2	2	
4	(South Sudan) Atlabara FC	3	0	1	2	0	3	−3	1	

Source: Soccerway
(H) Hosts
1 August 2021
13:00 UTC+3

Young Africans SC (Tanzania)	1–1	(Malawi) Big Bullets FC
J. Waziri 7'	Report	C. Msowoya 29'

B. Mkapa Stadium, Dar es Salam
Referee: Georges Gatogato (Burundi)
2 August 2021
13:00 UTC+3

Express FC (Uganda)	1–0	(South Sudan) Atlabara FC
E. Kambale 4' (pen.)	Report

Azam Complex Stadium, Dar es Salam
Referee: Mfaume Nassoro (Zanzibar)

4 August 2021
13:00 UTC+3

Big Bullets FC (Malawi)	1–1	(Uganda) Express FC
C. Msowoya 65'	Report	M. Mutyaba 4'

B. Mkapa Stadium, Dar es Salam
Referee: Elly Ally Sasii (Tanzania)
4 August 2021
16:00 UTC+3

Atlabara FC (South Sudan)	0–0	(Tanzania) Young Africans SC
	Report

B. Mkapa Stadium, Dar es Salam
Referee: William Oloya (Uganda)

7 August 2021
13:00 UTC+3

Big Bullets FC (Malawi)	2–0	(South Sudan) Atlabara FC
N. Nyasulu 2'; H. Kajoke 34'	Report

Azam Complex Stadium, Dar es Salam
Referee: Mfaume Nassoro (Zanzibar)
7 August 2021
13:00 UTC+3

Young Africans SC (Tanzania)	1–3	(Uganda) Express FC
G. Paul 70'	Report	G. Lwesibawa 14'; M. Mutyaba 34'; E. Kambale 53'

B. Mkapa Stadium, Dar es Salam
Referee: Thierry Nkurunziza (Burundi)

=== Group B ===
Pos	Team	Pld	W	D	L	GF	GA	GD	Pts	Qualification
1	(Tanzania) Azam FC (H)	3	2	0	1	5	3	+2	6	Advanced to Knockout stage
2	(Zanzibar) KMKM FC	3	1	1	1	4	4	0	4	Advanced to Knockout stage
3	(Burundi) Messager Ngozi FC	3	1	1	1	2	2	0	4	
4	(Uganda) KCCA FC	3	1	0	2	1	3	−2	3	

Source: Soccerway
(H) Hosts
2 August 2021
15:30 UTC+3

Messager FC Ngozi (Burundi)	1–1	(Zanzibar) KMKM FC
A. Muderi 18'	Report	M. Mess 40'

Azam Complex Stadium, Dar es Salam
Referee: William Oloya (Uganda)
2 August 2021
18:00 UTC+3

KCCA FC (Uganda)	0–2	(Tanzania) Azam FC
	Report	P. Peter 47' 63'

Azam Complex Stadium, Dar es Salam
Referee: Ring Malong (South Sudan)

5 August 2021
13:00 UTC+3

Azam FC (Tanzania)	1–0	(Burundi) Messager FC Ngozi
I. Kipagwile 22'	Report

Azam Complex Stadium, Dar es Salam
Referee: Ring Malong (South Sudan)
5 August 2021
16:00 UTC+3

KMKM FC (Zanzibar)	0–1	(Uganda) KCCA FC
	Report	H. Achai 20'

Azam Complex Stadium, Dar es Salam
Referee: Thierry Nkurunziza (Burundi)

7 August 2021
16:00 UTC+3

Azam FC (Tanzania)	2–3	(Zanzibar) KMKM FC
I. Kipagwile 43'; P. Peter 83'	Report	H. Salim 54'; H. Ali 67'; A. Ibrahim 73'

Azam Complex Stadium, Dar es Salam
Referee: Georges Gatogato (Burundi)
7 July 2021
16:00 UTC+3

KCCA FC (Uganda)	0–1	(Burundi) Messager FC Ngozi
	Report	E. Mbirizi 35'

B. Mkapa Stadium, Dar es Salam
Referee: Elly Ally Sasii (Tanzania)

== Knockout stage ==
- In the knockout stage, extra-time and a penalty shoot-out will be used to decide the winner if necessary.

=== Bracket ===
Semi-finals
10 August—Dar es Salam
(Uganda) Express FC	2
(Zanzibar) KMKM FC	1
11 August—Dar es Salam
(Tanzania) Azam FC	2 (2)
(Malawi) Big Bullets FC(p)	2 (4)

Final
14 August—Dar es Salam
(Uganda) Express FC	1
(Malawi) Big Bullets FC	0
Third place match
14 August—Dar es Salam
(Zanzibar) KMKM FC	1
(Tanzania) Azam FC	0

=== Semi-finals ===
10 August 2021
19:00 UTC+3

Express FC (Uganda)	2–1	(Zanzibar) KMKM FC
M. Mutyaba 56'; E. Kambale 90+3'	Report	I. Abdallah 45+2'

Azam Complex Stadium, Dar es Salam
Referee: Ring Malong (South Sudan)
11 August 2021
19:00 UTC+3

Azam FC (Tanzania)	2–2	(Malawi) Big Bullets FC
N. Nyasulu 67' (o.g.); T. Evancy 74'	Report	B. Munthali 2', 78'
Penalties
	2–4

Azam Complex Stadium, Dar es Salam
Referee: Thierry Nkurunziza (Burundi)

=== Third place match ===
14 August 2021
14:00 UTC+3

KMKM FC (Zanzibar)	1–0	(Tanzania) Azam FC
I. Mohamed 3'	Report

B. Mkapa Stadium, Dar es Salam
Referee: William Oloya (Uganda)

=== Final ===
14 August 2021
18:00 UTC+3

Express FC (Uganda)	1–0	(Malawi) Big Bullets FC
M. Kizza 22'	Report

B. Mkapa Stadium, Dar es Salam
Referee: Georges Gatogato (Burundi)

== Statistics ==
=== Goalscorers ===
There have been 32 goals scored in 16 matches, for an average of 2 goals per match.

3 goals

- (Uganda) Muzamiru Mutyaba (Express FC)
- (Uganda) Eric Kambale (Express FC)
- (Tanzania) Paul Peter (Azam FC)

2 goals

- (Malawi) Bright Munthali (Big Bullets FC)
- (Malawi) Chiukepo Msowoya (Big Bullets FC)
- (Tanzania) Idd Kipagwile (Azam FC)
- (Zanzibar) Abdallah Ibrahim (KMKM FC)

1 goal

- (Tanzania) Junior Waziri (Azam FC)
- (Burundi) Akbar Muderi (Messager FC Ngozi)
- (Zanzibar) Muhammed Mess (KMKM FC)
- (Uganda) Herbert Achai (KCCA FC)
- (Tanzania) Godfrey Paul (Young Africans FC)
- (Uganda) Godfrey Lwesibawa (Express FC)
- (Malawi) Nikson Nyasulu (Big Bullets FC)
- (Malawi) Hassan Kajoke (Big Bullets FC)
- (Burundi) Eric Mbirizi (Messager FC Ngozi)
- (Zanzibar) Haji Simba Salim (KMKM FC)
- (Zanzibar) Hasim Ramadhan Ali (KMKM FC)
- (Tanzania) Tepsi Evancy (Azam FC)
- (Zanzibar) Iliyasa Mohamed (KMKM FC)
- (Uganda) Martin Kizza (Express FC)

1 own goal

- (Malawi) Nikson Nyasulu (against Azam FC)
