= Lukuli Hearts United Football Club =

Ugandan football club

Lukuli Hearts United FC
- Full name: Lukuli Hearts United Football Club
- Nickname: The minners
- Founded: 1958,68 years ago.
- Ground: Lukuli Playground
- Chairman: Nkugwa Isa
- Manager: Sawoamaso Julius
- Coach: Mutebi Musa
- League: Kampala Regional League

Lukuli Hearts United Football Club, also nicknamed The Minners is a Ugandan football club established in 1958. It is located in Makindye Division. The team currently competes in the Kampala Region League, which is the 3rd Division league in the Ugandan football pyramid.

== History ==
In 1958, Ssekabaka Sir Edward Mutesa visited his friend Mr. Kayunga George for lunch in Lukuli Makindye division, and the two had a friendly match with the villagers. After the match, Ssekabaka Sir Edward Mutesa donated 5 acres of land to the local team to continue nurturing football. The local football team was named Lukuli football club at time,this was later charged Lukuli United Football club and in 2002 it was named Lukuli Hearts United Football Club.

In the 2022-2023 session, Lukuli Hearts United FC emerged sixth out of 13 after accumulating 16 points and Catida FC was in the lead with 27 points.

In 2026,the club registered an academy called Toronto City Soccer Academy,the children under this academy get to go to school through their bursary program.

== Club kits ==
- Home Kit: Blue with white and orange strips on the Tshirts
- Away Kit: Green with white strips on both the short and Tshirt
- Stockings: Blue and or Green

== Ground ==
Lukuli Ssabadu playground, it accommodates around 500 people per match.

== Ownership and finance ==
The club survives on donations and contributions from managers, well wishers and the general community.

It also received 8 million shillings from FUFA since it is among Kampala Regional Football Association 3rd Division Clubs.

on an away match.

== Players ==
In 1962, Bukenya George who was playing for Lukuli football club, present day Lukuli Hearts united was invited to play for the Uganda Cranes as a second goalkeeper.

Footballers who played for Lukuli Hearts united football club include; Phillip Ssozi, Nestroy Kizito, Hassan Mubiru, Augustine Nsumba, Nicolaus Wadada, Habibi Kavuma, Ronald Muganga, David Owori.

=== First team squad ===
Note: Flags indicate national team as defined under FIFA eligibility rules; some limited exceptions apply. Players may hold more than one non-FIFA nationality.

No.	Pos.	Player	Nationality
01	Goal Keeper	Kalule Mustapha	Uganda
02	Defender	Wamono Noel	Uganda
03	Defender	Wasswa Abdul	Uganda
04	Defender/Team Captain	Kalule Trevor	Uganda
05	Midfielder	Ssessanga Medi	Uganda
06	Midfielder	Ssebandeke Ramadhan	Uganda
07	Midfielder	Kaye Peter	Uganda
08	Midfielder	Musoke Aniirzak	Uganda
09	Striker	Ssekandi Hassan	Uganda
10	Midfielder	Mvule Geofrey	Uganda
11	Winger	Ssebunya Sharif	Uganda
12	Striker	Abdulrahman Juma	Uganda
13	Midfielder	Shafik Ssekinemye	Uganda
14	Winger	Ssebuliba Ibrahim Brian	Uganda
15	Midfielder	Lubega Isihaaq	Uganda
16	Defender	Sempa Hudson	Uganda
17	Winger	Owen Mwanje	Uganda
18	Defender	Katabalwa Mathias	Uganda
19	Striker	Kamegeri Jonathan	Uganda
20	Defender	Lubega Kenny Musa	Uganda
21	GoalKeeper	Kakooza Joseph	Uganda
22	Winger	Mubiru Sharifu	Uganda
23	Defender	Makoba Eddy	Uganda
24	GoalKeeper	Ahmed Abdul	Uganda

== Management and staff ==
This is the clubs executive committee as of 2025–2026.

Top Management
Name	Position
Nkugwa Isa	Chairman
Lutwama Steven Kigongo	CEO
Kizito Rashid	Assistant CEO
Sensasi Boney	Assistant CEO

Below is the technical team as of 2025–2026.

Lukuli hearts United FC technical team consists of its former players.

Technical Team
Name	Position
Wasswa Richard Sseruyange	Head Technical /Finance
Kabanda Iginitius	Stadium Manager
Mutebi Musa	Head Coach
Phillip Ssozi	Assistant coach for main team; head coach for the academy.
Magambo Andrew	Goalkeeping Coach
Kakembo Fred	First aid

== See also ==
- Buganda Masaza Cup
- David Owiri
- Uganda National Football team
