= Tom Saintfiet =

Belgian football coach and former player

Personal information
- Full name: Tom Julianus Saintfiet
- Date of birth: 29 March 1973 (age 53)
- Place of birth: Mol, Belgium
- Position: Midfielder

Senior career*
Years	Team	Apps	(Gls)
1991–1992	Stade Leuven		
1992–1993	Zwarte Duivels		
1993–1996	Oude God Sport		
1996–1997	FC Boom		

Managerial career
- 1997–1998: FC Zammel
- 1998–2000: Dessel Sport (youth)
- 2000: Satelitte Abidjan
- 2002–2003: B71 Sandur
- 2002–2003: Stormvogels Telstar
- 2003–2004: Al-Gharafa
- 2004: Qatar U17
- 2005–2006: BV Cloppenburg
- 2006–2007: FC Emmen (Technical Director)
- 2008: RoPS
- 2008–2010: Namibia
- 2010: Zimbabwe
- 2010–2011: Shabab Al-Ordon
- 2011: Ethiopia
- 2012: Young Africans
- 2012–2013: Yemen
- 2013: Malawi
- 2014: Free State Stars
- 2015–2016: Togo
- 2016: Bangladesh
- 2016–2017: Trinidad and Tobago
- 2017–2018: Malta
- 2018–2024: Gambia
- 2024: Philippines
- 2024–2026: Mali
Medal record
Representing Qatar (as manager)
AFC U-17 Championship
Third place	2004
- * Club domestic league appearances and goals

Tom Saintfiet (born 29 March 1973) is a Belgian football coach and former player. Most recently he was the head coach of the Mali national team.

He managed the Gambian national team from 2018 to 2024, earning a place in the top five list of best coaches of the year in the African continent in 2022 and 2023, voted by Confédération Africaine de Football. In 2022, he was second runner-up for the Royal Belgian Football Association's "Coach of the Year" award. By April 2026, Saintfiet has already achieved 124 FIFA official matches as coach of national teams.

== Coaching career ==
Saintfiet has coached in several countries, including Belgium, Qatar, Germany, Faroe Islands, Finland, Jordan and the Netherlands. He has also worked in Africa, having been the head coach of the national teams of Namibia, Zimbabwe, Ethiopia, Malawi and Togo, among others. Saintfiet was manager of Finnish Premier League club RoPS Rovaniemi. In 2002, he coached Faroese team B71 and finished second in the Faroe Islands First Division. He then became coach at Al-Ittihad Sports Club in Qatar (now called Al-Gharafa Sports Club). In 2004, he coached the Qatar national under-17 football team to third place in the AFC U-17 Championship, qualifying for the FIFA U-17 World Cup in the process. Prior to the 2010 FIFA World Cup, Saintfiet was one of the candidates to lead the Nigerian national team for the World Cup campaign in South Africa. He would be named as the team's technical director in 2012 and became a candidate for the head coach position again in 2016.

=== Namibia ===
Saintfiet started off successfully with Namibia by beating Comoros and Malawi and playing a draw against Lesotho in the COSAFA Senior Challenge Cup in South Africa in July 2008. Namibia were eliminated in the quarter-final at the hands of eventual champion and host South Africa. Saintfiet's achievements with Namibia include defeating Zimbabwe 4–2 in a 2010 FIFA World Cup qualifier and DR Congo 4–0 in a friendly. Three days after a 1–1 away draw against Lebanon in April 2009, Namibia once again got an impressive result with a 0–0 draw away to Angola. However, perhaps his most impressive result came in Durban, when Namibia drew 1–1 with South Africa after leading for much of the game. Namibia had only won 1 game out of 12 in the months before Saintfiet's arrival. Under his leadership, Namibia rose 34 places in the FIFA World Rankings to the highest position they had achieved in the past 10 years. After these performances, the Namibian press nicknamed Saintfiet "The Saint" and one newspaper even called him "The Messiah".

=== Zimbabwe ===
After being heavily linked with the job, Sainfiet emerged successful through a shortlist of 15 candidates and signed a four-year contract with the Zimbabwe Football Association on 1 October 2010. In November, Zimbabwean immigration authorities refused to issue a work permit to the "Warriors" coach and Saintfiet was requested to leave. The Zimbabwe Football Association (ZIFA) then appealed the decision taken by the department of immigration to turn down Saintfiet's work permit application for national team coach. On 10 October, Zimbabwe played Cape Verde in Harare in a 2012 Africa Cup of Nations qualification match, with the game resulting in a 1–1 draw. Saintfiet had trained the squad prior to the match although he was made to leave the camp due to the issues regarding work permits. From his base in Namibia, Saintfiet put in place the tactics and selected the national team squad that beat Mozambique 3–1 in the following match. After being refused a work permit by the immigration department for a second time, he was forced to leave his role as head coach of Zimbabwe in October 2010. Former Manchester City player Benjani Mwaruwari announced his international retirement immediately after Saintfiet was forced out of the country.

=== Shabab Al Ordon ===
In late December 2010, Saintfiet signed a four-month contract with 2007 AFC Cup winners Shabab Al Ordon. Saintfiet displayed again a well-organized defense, with his team only conceding one goal in the first five matches with him in charge. He never lost a match with the club and guided them to second position in the national championship.

=== Ethiopia ===
Saintfiet was named head coach of Ethiopia in late May 2011. Within 10 days of taking over, he guided the Ethiopia national football team, composed of local players, to a 2–2 draw against Nigeria in the 2012 AFCON qualifiers. In a full Addis Ababa Stadium, fans watched Ethiopia take the lead for most of the game, only for Nigeria captain Joseph Yobo to score in the 86th minute to rescue a point. After beating Madagascar 4–2 Saintfiet voluntarily resigned his position as head coach on 28 October 2011 citing disagreements with the FA.

=== Nigeria ===
In March 2012, Saintfiet was appointed as the technical director of Nigeria by the Nigeria Football Federation (NFF). However, the Nigerian ministry of sports hinted three months later that there were many competent Nigerians and preferred a Nigerian instead of a foreign technical director. Therefore, he could not obtain a work visa to enter Nigeria.

=== Young Africans SC ===
In July 2012, Saintfiet took charge of Tanzania club Young Africans SC. He immediately guided the club to win the 2012 CECAFA Club Cup/Kagame Interclub Cup, the club's fifth Champions League of East and Central Africa. It was also the first time the club won the trophy two consecutive times. He was however let go in September after two league games because of a disagreement with the club board. Saintfiet guided the team in 16 matches, with 13 wins, 1 draw and 2 losses before he left.

=== Yemen, Malawi and Free State Stars ===
Between 2012 and 2013, Saintfiet was in charge of the Yemen national football team. On 3 July 2013, he took over as the head coach of the Malawi national football team on a three-month deal. The goal was to qualify Malawi for the first time in history for the World Cup but he did not succeed. A lack of budget stopped both parties to extend the three-month deal into a long-term contract. Two years later the FAM President stated in a BBC interview that their poor performances of the last two years (2014–2015) were a result of not signing Saintfiet earlier.

On 2 July 2014, he was named the head coach of South African side Free State Stars. The club had ended the previous season in fourteenth place in the national league. After ten league matches into the 2014–2015 season, Saintfiet got fired after a dispute with the technical director and son of the owner, Kootso Mokoena. At that moment the team was in eleventh place in the league, three points behind champion favorites Orlando Pirates and Bidvest Wits. In the months after his sacking the team dropped to relegation zone (16th place) only to be rescued in the last games.

=== Togo ===
Saintfiet signed a contract as the head coach of Togo in May 2015. His first match at the helm of the Togo national team, however, had been three months earlier against Mauritius (28 March), as interim. Saintfiet guided Togo towards qualification for the 2017 Africa Cup of Nations. He left Togo in April 2016. In the 14 months in charge of the "Sparrow Hawks" he worked under 3 different FA Presidents (and boards) and 2 different Ministers of Sport.

=== Bangladesh ===
Saintfiet signed a short three-month contract with Bangladesh in June 2016. The start of his tenure did not go well as Bangladesh lost 0–5 to Maldives in an international friendly, the biggest defeat in Saintfiet's career so far. But the team bounced back with a 0–0 home draw against the Bhutan in a 2019 AFC Asian Cup qualification match. Saintfiet cited the lack of strikers in the team as a major concern.

=== Trinidad and Tobago ===
Saintfiet, who took up the position of head coach of Trinidad and Tobago on 7 December 2016 following the dismissal of Stephen Hart, tendered his resignation to the Trinidad and Tobago Football Association (TTFA) only 35 days later. In the four matches Trinidad and Tobago played with Saintfiet at the helm, the team lost 2–1 to Nicaragua and then defeated them 3–1. Trinidad and Tobago lost in extra-time to both Suriname and Haiti in a Caribbean playoff for the 2017 CONCACAF Gold Cup qualifiers. Saintfiet cited a lack of support as the reason for his departure in a statement he released. He could never use his best team, the games were played on non-FIFA dates and about 15 major players weren't available for different reasons. He was forced to use mostly local based players but TTFA and the league did not accept his request to postpone the league for 2 weeks during the preparation and the play-offs. For this reason, Saintfiet could not even select his best local based players. This combined with TTFA ignoring his request for a professional qualified capable staff were the reason he resigned.

=== Malta ===
On 11 October 2017, Saintfiet was appointed head coach of the Malta national team, his first appointment to a European national side. His first game in charge was on 12 November 2017, a 3–0 defeat to Estonia. After just three games in charge and with reports that Saintfiet was one of the coaches who applied for the post as Cameroon head coach, the Malta Football Association terminated his contract.

=== Gambia ===
Saintfiet was appointed manager of the Gambian national team on 18 July 2018. He made his debut in a 1–1 draw against Algeria valid for the 2019 Africa Cup of Nations qualification. On 25 March 2021, Saintfiet made history with Gambia by qualifying the country for the Africa Cup of Nations for the first with a 1–0 victory over Angola in Bakau while also finishing as the top team in Group D.

Gambia joined the 2021 Africa Cup of Nations as the lowest-ranked team of the tournament as well as the lowest-ranked team ever to participate in AFCON. They debuted with a 1–0 win over Mauritania followed by a 1–1 draw to Mali. Gambia qualified for the round of 16 with a game to spare and on 20 January defeated Tunisia 1–0 in their final group match. They finished with the same points as Mali, which, however, won the group due to a better overall goal difference.

Gambia continued to impress in the round of 16, defeating Guinea 1–0 to advance to the quarter-finals of the tournament. After a goalless first half, Gambia lost 2–0 to host Cameroon in the quarter-final in Douala.

On 23 January 2024, Saintfiet resigned from his position after the 2023 Africa Cup of Nations group stage exit.

=== Philippines ===
On 26 February 2024, Saintfiet was appointed as head coach of the Philippines national team.

On 29 August 2024, PFF announced Saintfiet has resigned as Philippines head coach ahead of the 2024 Merdeka Tournament. He invoked a clause in his contract allowing him to move back to Africa.

=== Mali ===
On the same day Saintfiet's resignation from the Philippines job was announced, he was also named the new Mali national team head coach.

The belgian tactician, since his arrival in the beginning of September 2024, managed the Mali national team to qualify for the African Cup 2025 as first in the Group I, with the stunning achievement of 4 wins and 2 draws, with 10 goals scored and just one conceded, resulting the best defense in Africa.

Under his leadership Mali achieved the record of most goals scored in a single match, a record that stood since 1972, reached against Eswatini on 19 November 2024, a match that finished 6-0 for Mali.

In the AFCON of 2025 Mali defeated Tunisia on penalties, reaching the quarter finals against Senegal, without losing a single match in the whole tournament.

== Managerial statistics ==
As of match played 31 March 2026

Managerial record by team and tenure
Team	From	To	Record				
Team	From	To	G	W	D	L	Win %
Satellite FC	1 February 2002	30 June 2002	5	3	1	1	60.00
Al-Ittihad	1 January 2004	30 June 2004	6	4	1	1	66.67
Cloppenburg	1 July 2005	24 October 2005	12	6	3	3	50.00
Namibia	1 July 2008	8 September 2010	16	4	8	4	25.00
Zimbabwe	25 September 2010	18 November 2010	1	1	0	0	100.00
Shabab Al-Qordon	3 January 2011	19 May 2011	6	3	3	0	50.00
Ethiopia	20 May 2011	28 October 2011	4	1	1	2	25.00
Yemen	12 October 2012	23 March 2013	5	0	0	5	0.00
Malawi	3 July 2013	9 September 2013	3	1	0	2	33.33
Turnhout	20 January 2014	30 June 2014	13	8	2	3	61.54
Free State Stars	1 July 2014	6 November 2014	11	3	2	6	27.27
Togo (caretaker)	26 March 2015	18 May 2015	1	0	1	0	0.00
Togo	19 May 2015	6 April 2016	7	2	1	4	28.57
Bangladesh	22 August 2016	16 October 2016	3	0	1	2	0.00
Trinidad and Tobago	7 December 2016	11 January 2017	4	1	0	3	25.00
Malta	11 October 2017	25 April 2018	3	0	0	3	0.00
Gambia	18 July 2018	23 January 2024	44	18	10	16	40.91
Philippines	26 February 2024	28 August 2024	4	0	0	4	0.00
Mali	29 August 2024	27 April 2026	21	9	9	3	42.86
Career Total			169	64	43	62	37.87

== Honours ==
Mali

- Qualified for AFCON (Africa Cup of Nations) 2025, as first in the Qualification Group I

Gambia

- Qualified for AFCON (Africa Cup of Nations) 2021, first appearance of Gambia in the most important Tournament of the continent
- Reached Quarter finals in AFCON (Africa Cup of Nations) 2021
- Qualified for AFCON (Africa Cup of Nations) 2023

KV Turnhout

- Qualified for the promotion play-offs: 2014

Young Africans

- CECAFA Club Cup/Kagame Interclub Cup: 2012

Qatar U17

- AFC U-17 Championship third place: 2004
- Qualification for the 2005 FIFA U-17 World Championship

B71 Sandur

- Faroe Islands First Division Vice Champion: 2002

Individual

- Top 5 best coaches of the year in the African continent, voted by CAF - Confédération Africaine de Football: 2023
- Second Runner-up for coach of the year in Belgium, voted by The Royal Belgian Football Association: 2022
- Top 5 best coaches of the year of the African continent, voted by CAF - Confédération Africaine de Football: 2022
- Namibia Sport Commission Sports Awards Coach of the Year runner-up: 2009
- Most Famous Sport Celebrity (Informanté): 2008
- The Namibian Coach of the Year: 2008

== See also ==
- National team managers with 100 or more matches
