= Kagame Interclub Cup =

- Founded: 1974
- Region: CECAFA
- Current champions: (Rwanda) Rayon Sports (2nd title)
- Most championships: (Tanzania) Simba (6 titles)
- Broadcaster: Azam TV

The CECAFA Club Cup is a football club tournament organised by CECAFA. It has been known as the Kagame Interclub Cup since 2002, when Rwandan president Paul Kagame began sponsoring the competition. It is contested by clubs from East and Central Africa.

== History ==
The tournament began in 1967, in which Lamba Lamba came out champions, but was not officially recognised. The competition was halted until 1974, where Mikia became the first official champions of the tournament.

== Previous winners ==
=== Finals ===
Key
*	Match was won on a penalty shootout
†	Tournament not held or not officially recognised

List of CECAFA Club Cup and Kagame Interclub Cup winners
Year	Countryside	Winners	Score	Runners-up	Countryside	Hosts
1967	Kenya	Abaluhya	5–0^{†}^{[A]}	Sunderland	Tanzania	
1968–1973	Halted^{†}^{[B]}					
1974	Tanzania	Simba	–	Abaluhya	Kenya	Tanzania
1975	Tanzania	Young Africans	2–0	Simba	Tanzania	Zanzibar
1976	Kenya	Luo Union	2–1	Young Africans	Tanzania	Uganda
1977	Kenya	Luo Union	2–1	Horsed	Somalia	Tanzania
1978	Uganda	Kampala City Council	0–0^{*}^{[C]}	Simba	Tanzania	Uganda
1979	Kenya	Abaluhya	1–0	Kampala City Council	Uganda	Somalia
1980	Kenya	Gor Mahia	3–2	Abaluhya	Kenya	Malawi
1981	Kenya	Gor Mahia	1–0	Simba	Tanzania	Kenya
1982	Kenya	A.F.C. Leopards	1–0	Rio Tinto	Zimbabwe	Kenya
1983	Kenya	A.F.C. Leopards	2–1	ADMARC Tigers	Malawi	Zanzibar
1984	Kenya	A.F.C. Leopards	2–1	Gor Mahia	Kenya	Kenya
1985	Kenya	Gor Mahia	2–0	A.F.C. Leopards	Kenya	Sudan
1986	Sudan	Al-Merrikh	2–2^{*}^{[D]}	Young Africans	Tanzania	Tanzania
1987	Uganda	Villa	1–0	Al-Merrikh	Sudan	Uganda
1988	Kenya	Kenya Breweries	2–0	Al-Merrikh	Sudan	Sudan
1989	Kenya	Kenya Breweries	3–0	Coastal Union	Tanzania	Kenya
1990	Not held^{†}^{[E]}					
1991	Tanzania	Simba	3–0	Villa	Uganda	Tanzania
1992	Tanzania	Simba	1–1^{*}^{[F]}	Young Africans	Tanzania	Zanzibar
1993	Tanzania	Young Africans	2–1	Villa	Uganda	Uganda
1994	Sudan	Al-Merrikh	2–1	Express	Uganda	Sudan
1995	Tanzania	Simba	1–1^{*}^{[G]}	Express	Uganda	Tanzania
1996	Tanzania	Simba	1–0	Armée Patriotique Rwandaise	Rwanda	Tanzania
1997	Kenya	A.F.C. Leopards	1–0	Kenya Breweries	Kenya	Kenya
1998	Rwanda	Rayon Sports	2–1	Mlandege	Zanzibar	Zanzibar
1999	Tanzania	Young Africans	1–1^{*}^{[H]}	Villa	Uganda	Uganda
2000	Kenya	Tusker	3–1	Armée Patriotique Rwandaise	Rwanda	Rwanda
2001	Kenya	Tusker	0–0^{*}^{[I]}	Oserian	Kenya	Kenya
2002	Tanzania	Simba	1–0	Prince Louis	Burundi	Zanzibar
2003	Uganda	Villa	1–0	Simba	Tanzania	Uganda
2004	Rwanda	Armée Patriotique Rwandaise	3–1	Ulinzi Stars	Kenya	Rwanda
2005	Uganda	Villa	3–0	Armée Patriotique Rwandaise	Rwanda	Tanzania
2006	Uganda	Police	2–1	Moro United	Tanzania	Tanzania
2007	Rwanda	Armée Patriotique Rwandaise	2–1	Uganda Revenue Authority	Uganda	Rwanda
2008	Kenya	Tusker	2–1	Uganda Revenue Authority	Uganda	Tanzania
2009	Rwanda	ATRACO	1–0	Al-Merrikh	Sudan	Sudan
2010	Rwanda	A.P.R.	2–0	St. George	Ethiopia	Rwanda
2011	Tanzania	Young Africans	1–0	Simba	Tanzania	Tanzania
2012	Tanzania	Young Africans	2–0	Azam	Tanzania	Tanzania
2013	Burundi	Vital'O	2–0	A.P.R.	Rwanda	Sudan
2014	Sudan	Al-Merrikh	1–0	A.P.R.	Rwanda	Rwanda
2015	Tanzania	Azam	2–0	Gor Mahia	Kenya	Tanzania
2016–2017	Not held					
2018	Tanzania	Azam	2–1	Simba	Uganda	Tanzania
2019	Uganda	Kampala City Council	1–0	Azam	Tanzania	Rwanda
2020	Not held					
2021	Uganda	Express FC	1–0	Nyasa Big Bullets	Malawi	Tanzania
2022–2023	Not held					
2024	Zambia	Red Arrows	1–1^{*}^{[J]}	APR FC	Rwanda	Tanzania
2025	Tanzania	Singida Black Stars	2–1	Al-Hilal	Sudan	Tanzania
2026	Rwanda	Rayon Sports	2–1	Gor Mahia FC	Kenya	Rwanda

Notes

A. The tournament was not officially recognised.

B. The tournament was halted.

C. Score was 0−0 after 90 minutes and extra time. Kampala won the shootout 3−2.

D. Score was 2−2 after 90 minutes and extra time. Al-Merreikh won the shootout 4−2.

E. The tournament was not held.

F. Score was 1−1 after 90 minutes and extra time. Simba won the shootout 5−4.

G. Score was 1−1 after 90 minutes and extra time. Simba won the shootout 5−3.

H. Score was 1−1 after 90 minutes and extra time. Young Africans won the shootout 4−1.

I. Score was 0−0 after 90 minutes and extra time. Tusker won the shootout 3−0.

J. Score was 1–1 after 90 minutes and extra time. Red Arrows won the shootout 10–9.

=== Winners and runners-up ===
Club	Winners	Runners-up	Years won	Years runners-up
(Tanzania) Simba	6	7	1974, 1991, 1992, 1995, 1996, 2002	1967, 1975, 1978, 1981, 2003, 2011, 2018
(Kenya) A.F.C. Leopards^{1}	6	3	1967, 1979, 1982, 1983, 1984, 1997	1974, 1980, 1985
(Tanzania) Young Africans	5	3	1975, 1993, 1999, 2011, 2012	1976, 1986, 1992
(Kenya) Tusker	5	1	1988, 1989, 2000, 2001, 2008	1997
(Rwanda) Armée Patriotique Rwandaise	3	6	2004, 2007, 2010	1996, 2000, 2005, 2013, 2014, 2024
(Sudan) Al-Merrikh	3	3	1986, 1994, 2014	1987, 1988, 2009
(Uganda) Villa	3	3	1987, 2003, 2005	1991, 1993, 1999
(Kenya) Gor Mahia	3	2	1980, 1981, 1985	1984, 2015
(Tanzania) Azam	2	2	2015, 2018	2012, 2019
(Uganda) Kampala City Council	2	1	1978, 2019	1979
(Kenya) Re-Union^{2}	2	0	1976, 1977	
(Rwanda) ATRACO	1	0	2009	None
(Uganda) Police	1	0	2006	None
(Rwanda) Rayon Sports	1	0	1998	None
(Burundi) Vital'O	1	0	2013	None
(Zambia) Red Arrows	1	0	2024	None
(Tanzania) Singida Black Stars	1	0	2025	None
(Uganda) Express FC	0	2	None	1994, 1995
Uganda Revenue Authority	0	2	None	2007, 2008
(Malawi) ADMARC Tigers	0	1	None	1983
(Tanzania) Coastal Union	0	1	None	1989
(Somalia) Horseed	0	1	None	1977
(Ethiopia) St George	0	1	None	2010
(Zanzibar) Mlandege FC	0	1	None	1998
(Tanzania) Moro United	0	1	None	2006
(Kenya) Oserian	0	1	None	2001
(Burundi) Prince Louis	0	1	None	2002
(Zimbabwe) Rio Tinto	0	1	None	1982
(Kenya) Ulinzi Stars	0	1	None	2004
(Sudan) Al Hilal	0	1	None	2025

^{1} Includes titles as Abaluhya
^{2} Includes titles as Luo Union.

=== By nation ===
Performance by nation
Nation	Winners	Runners-up	Winning Clubs
Kenya	16	7	3
Tanzania	14	13	4
Uganda	6	8	4
Rwanda	5	5	3
Sudan	3	4	1
Burundi	1	1	1
Malawi	0	1	0
Somalia	0	1	0
Zimbabwe	0	1	0

== See also ==
- CECAFA Cup
- CECAFA Nile Basin Cup
