= Martin Muwanga =

Ugandan footballer (born 1983)

Personal information
- Date of birth: October 20, 1983 (age 43)
- Place of birth: Uganda
- Height: 1.80 m (5 ft 11 in)
- Position: Forward

Team information
- Current team: Uganda Revenue Authority SC
- Number: 9

Youth career
- –2003: Police Jinja

Senior career*
Years	Team	Apps	(Gls)
2004–2006	Police Jinja		
2006–2008	ATRACO FC		
2008–present	Uganda Revenue Authority SC		

International career
2004–2005	Uganda	2	(0)
- * Club domestic league appearances and goals as of August 31, 2007

Martin Muwanga (born October 20, 1983) is a Ugandan football striker. He currently plays for the Ugandan Premier League club FC Galaxia.

== Career ==
Muwanga began his career with Police Jinja in the Ugandan Premier League, before moving to ATRACO FC in 2006 and then to Uganda Revenue Authority SC in 2008.

== International career ==
He played from 2004 to 2005 two games for the Uganda national football team.
