= 2013 Kagame Interclub Cup =

CECAFA Club Cup

Tournament details
- Host country: Sudan
- Dates: 18 June–1 July
- Teams: 13 (from 10 associations)
- Venues: 2 (in 2 host cities)

Final positions
- Champions: (Burundi) Vital'O (1st title)
- Runners-up: (Rwanda) A.P.R.
- Third place: (Sudan) Al-Merreikh Al-Fasher
- Fourth place: (Rwanda) Rayon Sports

Tournament statistics
- Matches played: 23
- Goals scored: 57 (2.48 per match)

The 2013 Kagame Interclub Cup was the 38th edition of the Kagame Interclub Cup, which is organised by CECAFA. It began on 18 June and ended on 1 July 2013. Sudan hosted the tournament for the fifth time since it officially began in 1974. Vital'O, who have won the Burundi Premier League a record 18 times, beat Primus National Football League side Armée Patriotique Rwandaise to win the tournament for the first time in their history. Prior to the beginning of the competition, clubs from Kenya, South Sudan and Tanzania withdrew from the tournament due to security concerns.

== Participants ==
On 22 May 2013, the draw for clubs to participate in the tournament was released. Due to dropouts the fixtures and group draws were amended only on 15 July, three days before the tournament.

Group A

- (Sudan) Al-Merreikh Al-Fasher
- (Rwanda) Armée Patriotique Rwandaise
- (Somalia) Elman
- (Burundi) Vital'O

Group B

- (Rwanda) Rayon Sports
- (Uganda) Express
- (Djibouti) Port
- (Chad) Elect-Sport (invitee)

Group C

- (Sudan) Al-Ahly Shendi
- (Sudan) Al-Hilal Kaduqli
- Uganda Revenue Authority

== Group stage ==
The group stage featured eleven teams, with 4 teams in Group A and B and only three in Group C. Three teams advanced from Group A and B and two from Group C.

If two or more teams are equal on points on completion of the group matches, the following criteria are applied to determine the rankings (in descending order):

1. Number of points obtained in games between the teams involved;
2. Goal difference in games between the teams involved;
3. Goals scored in games between the teams involved;
4. Away goals scored in games between the teams involved;
5. Goal difference in all games;
6. Goals scored in all games;
7. Drawing of lots.

=== Group A ===
Results:

Team	Pld	W	D	L	GF	GA	GD	Pts
(Burundi) Vital'O	3	1	2	0	3	2	+1	5
(Rwanda) A.P.R.	3	1	2	0	3	2	+1	5
(Sudan) Al-Merreikh Al-Fasher	3	1	1	1	3	2	+1	4
(Somalia) Elman	3	0	1	2	1	4	−3	1

19 June 2013
Al-Merreikh Al-Fasher (Sudan)	0–1	(Burundi) Vital'O
Elman (Somalia)	0–1	(Rwanda) A.P.R.
21 June 2013
A.P.R. (Rwanda)	1–1	(Sudan) Al-Merreikh Al-Fasher
Vital'O (Burundi)	1–1	(Somalia) Elman
23 June 2013
Al-Merreikh Al-Fasher (Sudan)	2–0	(Somalia) Elman
Vital'O (Burundi)	1–1	(Rwanda) A.P.R.

=== Group B ===
Results:

Team	Pld	W	D	L	GF	GA	GD	Pts
(Uganda) Express	3	1	2	0	3	2	+1	5
(Rwanda) Rayon Sports	3	1	1	1	8	6	+2	4
(Djibouti) Port	3	1	1	1	4	5	−1	4
(Chad) Elect-Sport	3	0	2	1	5	7	−2	2

20 June 2013
Port (Djibouti)	0–0	(Uganda) Express
Elect-Sport (Chad)	3–3	(Rwanda) Rayon Sports
22 June 2013
Express (Uganda)	2–1	(Rwanda) Rayon Sports
Elect-Sport (Chad)	1–3	(Djibouti) Port
24 June 2013
Express (Uganda)	1–1	(Chad) Elect-Sport
Rayon Sports (Rwanda)	4–1	(Djibouti) Port

=== Group C ===
Results:

Team	Pld	W	D	L	GF	GA	GD	Pts
(Sudan) Al-Ahly Shendi	2	1	1	0	2	1	+1	4
(Uganda) U.R.A.	2	1	0	1	1	1	0	3
(Sudan) Al-Hilal Kaduqli	2	0	1	1	1	2	−1	1

18 June 2013
Al-Hilal Kaduqli (Sudan)	0–1	(Uganda) U.R.A.
20 June 2013
U.R.A. (Uganda)	0–1	(Sudan) Al-Ahly Shendi
22 June 2013
Al-Ahly Shendi (Sudan)	1–1	(Sudan) Al-Hilal Kaduqli

== Knockout stage ==
In the knockout stage, teams play against each other once. The losers of the semi-finals played against each other in a third place playoff where the winner was placed third overall in the entire competition.

Quarter-finals
26 June
(Uganda) Express	0
(Rwanda) A.P.R.	2
26 June
(Sudan) Al-Merreikh (a.e.t.)	2
(Sudan) Al-Ahly Shendi	1
27 June
(Uganda) U.R.A.	2
(Rwanda) Rayon Sports	3
27 June
(Burundi) Vital'O	6
(Djibouti) Port	0

Semi-finals
28 June
(Rwanda) A.P.R.	2
(Sudan) Al-Merreikh	1
29 June
(Rwanda) Rayon Sports	0
(Burundi) Vital'O	1

Final
1 July
(Rwanda) A.P.R.	0
(Burundi) Vital'O	2
Third place
1 July
(Sudan) Al-Merreikh	1
(Rwanda) Rayon Sports	0
