= 2024 Kagame Interclub Cup =

CECAFA Kagame Cup

Tournament details
- Host country: Tanzania
- Dates: 9–21 July 2024
- Teams: 12 (from 10 associations)
- Venues: 2 (in 1 host city)

Final positions
- Champions: (Zambia) Red Arrows (1st title)
- Runners-up: (Rwanda) APR FC
- Third place: (Sudan) Al-Hilal
- Fourth place: (Sudan) Al-Wadi

Tournament statistics
- Matches played: 22
- Goals scored: 43 (1.95 per match)
- All statistics correct as of 22 July 2024.

The 2024 CECAFA Kagame Interclub Cup was the 46th edition of the Kagame Interclub Cup, a football competition for clubs in East and Central Africa, which is organized by CECAFA. The competition was held in Tanzania from 9 to 21 July.

== Format ==
Twelve teams from 10 associations (including one from COSAFA) are placed in three groups of four teams each. The top teams in each group and the best runners up will automatically qualify for the semi-final stage.

== Participating clubs ==
The following twelve teams will contest in the tournament.

- (Sudan) Al-Hilal
- (South Sudan) Al-Merreikh Bentiu
- (Sudan) Al-Wadi
- (Rwanda) APR FC
- (Djibouti) AS Ali Sabieh
- (Tanzania) Coastal Union F.C.
- (Somalia) Dekedaha
- (Kenya) Gor Mahia
- (Zanzibar) JKU
- (Zambia) Red Arrows
- (Tanzania) Singida Black Stars
- (Uganda) SC Villa

== Venues ==
The following two venues will host the matches of the tournament.

Dar es Salaam	Dar es Salaam is located in Tanzania	Dar es Salaam
Chamazi Stadium	Dar es Salaam is located in Tanzania	KMC Stadium
Capacity: 10,000	Dar es Salaam is located in Tanzania	Capacity: 23,000

== Draw ==
The draw ceremony of the tournament were held on 3 July at Dar es Salaam. The twelve teams were divided into three groups.

== Group stage ==
Tie-breaking criteria for group play
The ranking of teams in each group was based on the following criteria:
1. Number of points obtained in games between the teams involved
2. Goal difference in games between the teams involved
3. Goals scored in games between the teams involved
4. Away goals scored in games between the teams involved
5. Goal difference in all games
6. Goals scored in all games
7. Drawing of lots

Key to colour in group tables
The top finisher in each group will qualify for the Knockout-stage

=== Group A ===
Pos	Team	Pld	W	D	L	GF	GA	GD	Pts	Qualification
1	(Sudan) Al-Wadi	3	2	1	0	4	2	+2	7	Advanced to Knockout stage
2	(Tanzania) Coastal Union	3	1	1	1	2	3	−1	4	
3	(Zanzibar) JKU	3	1	0	2	3	3	0	3	
4	(Somalia) Dekedaha	3	1	0	2	3	4	−1	3	

9 July 2024
13:00 UTC+3

Al-Wadi (Sudan)	1–0	(Zanzibar) JKU
Mohammed 4'

KMC Stadium, Dar es Salaam
9 July 2024
16:00 UTC+3

Coastal Union (Tanzania)	1–0	(Somalia) Dekedaha
Ramadhani 45+1'

KMC Stadium, Dar es Salaam

12 July 2024
13:00 UTC+3

Coastal Union (Tanzania)	0–2	(Zanzibar) JKU
		Matta 28'; Neva 86'

KMC Stadium, Dar es Salaam
12 July 2024
16:00 UTC+3

Al-Wadi (Sudan)	2–1	(Somalia) Dekedaha
Esmat 11'; Zidan 19'		Nur Irad 78'

KMC Stadium, Dar es Salaam

15 July 2024
16:00 UTC+3

Coastal Union (Tanzania)	1–1	(Sudan) Al-Wadi
Hasoon 48'		Abdallah 53'

Chamazi Stadium, Dar es Salaam
15 July 2024
16:00 UTC+3

JKU (Zanzibar)	1–2	(Somalia) Dekedaha
Hamis 4'		Abdalie 61' Oluwaseun 71'

KMC Stadium, Dar es Salaam

=== Group B ===
Pos	Team	Pld	W	D	L	GF	GA	GD	Pts	Qualification
1	(Sudan) Al-Hilal	3	3	0	0	9	0	+9	9	Advanced to Knockout stage
2	(Zambia) Red Arrows	3	2	0	1	2	5	−3	6	Advanced to Knockout stage
3	(Kenya) Gor Mahia	3	0	1	2	1	4	−3	1	
4	(Djibouti) AS Ali Sabieh	3	0	1	2	1	4	−3	1	

Updated to match(es) played on 13 July 2024. Source:
10 July 2024
18:00 UTC+3

Al-Hilal (Sudan)	2–0	(Djibouti) AS Ali Sabieh
Abdelrahman 24' (pen.), 27'

Chamazi Stadium, Dar es Salaam
10 July 2024
21:00 UTC+3

Gor Mahia (Kenya)	0–1	(Zambia) Red Arrows
		Chamanga 73'

Chamazi Stadium, Dar es Salaam

13 July 2024
18:00 UTC+3

Al-Hilal (Sudan)	5–0	(Zambia) Red Arrows
Coulibaly 9', 55', 63' Abdelrahman 14', 24'

Chamazi Stadium, Dar es Salaam
13 July 2024
21:00 UTC+3

Gor Mahia (Kenya)	1–1	(Djibouti) AS Ali Sabieh
Odhiambo 39'		Said 41'

Chamazi Stadium, Dar es Salaam
16 July 2024
--:-- UTC+3

Al-Hilal (Sudan)	2–0	(Kenya) Gor Mahia
Salah Adel 56' Abdelrahman 89'

Chamazi Stadium, Dar es Salaam
16 July 2024
--:-- UTC+3

AS Ali Sabieh (Djibouti)	0–1	(Zambia) Red Arrows
		Shipanuka 21'

KMC Stadium, Dar es Salaam

=== Group C ===
Pos	Team	Pld	W	D	L	GF	GA	GD	Pts	Qualification
1	(Rwanda) APR FC	3	2	1	0	3	1	+2	7	Advanced to Knockout stage
2	(Uganda) SC Villa	3	1	2	0	4	2	+2	5	
3	(Tanzania) Singida Black Stars	3	1	0	2	4	5	−1	3	
4	(South Sudan) Al-Merreikh Bentiu	3	0	1	2	1	4	−3	1	

9 July 2024
18:00 UTC+3

SC Villa (Uganda)	0–0	(South Sudan) Al-Merreikh Bentiu

Chamazi Stadium, Dar es Salaam
9 July 2024
21:00 UTC+3

APR FC (Rwanda)	1–0	(Tanzania) Singida Black Stars
Mbaoma 22'

Chamazi Stadium, Dar es Salaam

12 July 2024
18:00 UTC+3

SC Villa (Uganda)	3–1	(Tanzania) Singida Black Stars
Yiga 45'; Kakande 52' (pen.); Mpande 56'		Tchakeh 60'

Chamazi Stadium, Dar es Salaam
12 July 2024
21:00 UTC+3

APR FC (Rwanda)	1–0	(South Sudan) Al-Merreikh Bentiu
Sy 69'

Chamazi Stadium, Dar es Salaam

15 July 2024
13:00 UTC+3

Singida Black Stars (Tanzania)	3–1	(South Sudan) Al-Merreikh Bentiu
Tchakeh 18' John 43' Lyanga 76'		James 49'

Chamazi Stadium, Dar es Salaam
15 July 2024
13:00 UTC+3

SC Villa (Uganda)	1–1	(Rwanda) APR FC
Dushimimana 30'		Yiga 45+2'

KMC Stadium, Dar es Salaam

== Knockout stage ==
- In the knockout stage, extra-time and a penalty shoot-out will be used to decide the winner if necessary.

=== Bracket ===
Semi-finals
19 July—Dar es Salaam
(Rwanda) APR FC (a.e.t.) (p)	0 (5)
(Sudan) Al Hilal	0 (4)
19 July—Dar es Salaam
(Sudan) Al Wadi	0
(Zambia) Red Arrows (a.e.t.)	2

Final
21 July—Dar es Salaam
(Rwanda) APR FC	1 (9)
(Zambia) Red Arrows (a.e.t.) (p)	1 (10)
Third place match
21 July—Dar es Salaam
(Sudan) Al-Hilal (p)	1 (1)
(Sudan) Al Wadi	1 (0)

=== Semi-finals ===
19 July 2024
15:00 UTC+3

APR FC (Rwanda)	0–0 (a.e.t.)	(Sudan) Al-Hilal
Penalties
	5–4

KMC Stadium, Dar es Salaam
19 July 2024
19:00 UTC+3

Al-Wadi (Sudan)	0–2 (a.e.t.)	(Zambia) Red Arrows
		Ketema 117'; Diarra 119'

Chamazi Stadium, Dar es Salaam

=== Third place match ===
21 July 2024
12:00 UTC+3

Al-Hilal (Sudan)	1–1	(Sudan) Al-Wadi
Altayeb 36'		Adam 40'
Penalties
	1–0

Chamazi Stadium, Dar es Salaam

=== Final ===
21 July 2024
15:00 UTC+3

APR FC (Rwanda)	1–1 (a.e.t.)	(Zambia) Red Arrows
Sy 90+1'		Banda 62'
Penalties
	9–10

Chamazi Stadium, Dar es Salaam
