= Kartileh FC =

Djibouti football club

Kartileh
- Full name: Kartileh Al-Gamil Football Club
- Ground: El Hadj Hassan Gouled Aptidon Stadium, Djibouti City, Djibouti
- Capacity: 40,000

Kartileh-Al Gamil is a football club based in Djibouti City, Djibouti.

== History ==
The club was founded in 1992 in the city of Kartileh under the name DjibSat until 2011 when it was changed to its current name.

At the international level, their main achievement was playing in the 2009 CECAFA Club Cup, in which they were eliminated in the group stage.
