= Haruna Moshi =

Tanzanian footballer (born 1987)

Personal information
- Full name: Haruna Moshi Shabani
- Date of birth: 31 May 1987 (age 39)
- Place of birth: Tabora, Tanzania
- Height: 1.79 m (5 ft 10 in)
- Position: Attacking midfielder

Team information
- Current team: Young Africans

Senior career*
Years	Team	Apps	(Gls)
2003–2004	Moro United		
2004–2009	Simba SC		
2010–2011	Gefle IF	5	(0)
2011–2013	Simba SC		
2013–2015	Coastal Union		
2015–2017	Mbeya City		
2017–2018	Friends Rangers		
2018	African Lyon		
2018–	Young Africans		

International career
2007–	Tanzania	24	
- * Club domestic league appearances and goals as of 17:43, 28 June 2010 (UTC)

Haruna Moshi Shabani (born 31 May 1987) is a Tanzanian professional footballer who plays as an attacking midfielder for Young Africans.

== Club career ==
Moshi was born in Tabora, Tanzania. He has played most of his career with local club Simba SC. However, he played one season with Muscat Club in Oman.

On 27 October 2009, it was announced that Moshi would have a trial at Swedish 2008 champions, Kalmar FF, together with fellow Tanzanian Joseph Kaniki. On 19 November 2009, Gefle IF reported that they had signed. Moshi.

On 15 July 2010, Moshi returned home to doubts and questions after failing to impress in the Swedish first division, and rejoined Simba SC with undisclosed deal. After completing his contract with Simba SC he joined Coastal Union of Tanga, Tanzania.

== International career ==
Moshi has played 24 games for the Tanzania national team, but has not been called up since the 2009 African Nations Championship finals.
