= David Owori =

Ugandan footballer (1998–2026)

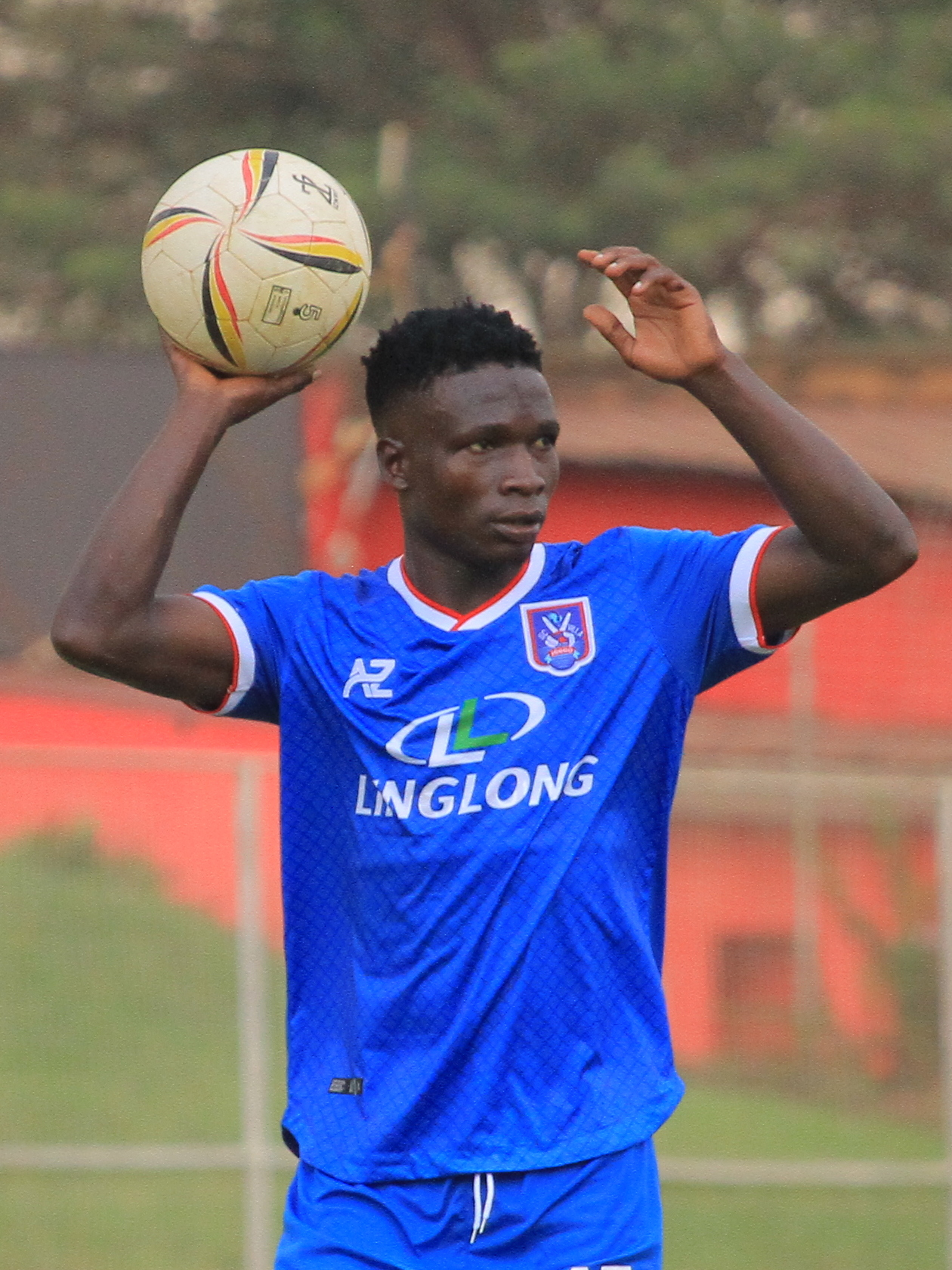
- Owori in 2024

Personal information
- Date of birth: 23 September 1998
- Place of birth: Tororo, Uganda
- Date of death: 5 August 2026 (aged 27)
- Place of death: Kampala, Uganda
- Height: 1.73 m (5 ft 8 in)
- Positions: Midfielder; right-back

Youth career
- 2014: Nsambya Young Stars Academy
- 2014–2015: Wembley Soccer Academy
- 2015–2016: Lukuli United

Senior career*
Years	Team	Apps	(Gls)
2016–2018	Vipers SC		
2018–2021	SC Villa		
2021–2022	Vélez CF		
2022–2023	Utsiktens BK	1	(0)
2023–2026	SC Villa	53+	(2+)

International career
- Uganda
- * Club domestic league appearances and goals

David Owori (23 September 1998 – 5 August 2026) was a Ugandan footballer who played as a midfielder.

== Early life and education ==
Owori was born in Tororo, Uganda, to Eriasaf Osinde and Bena Nyadio. He attended Christ the King Primary School (Nsambya), Mackey Memorial Nateete, Masaka Town College, Star SS Jeza, East High School Ntinda, and Lubiri SS before joining St. Lawrence University.

== Club career ==
=== Early career (2014–2016) ===
Owori began his football career with Nsambya Young Stars Academy before joining Wembley Soccer Academy and later Lukuli United, a Kampala-based regional side.

=== Vipers SC (2016–2018) ===
He was recruited by Vipers SC in 2016, where he featured in youth and senior squads, before moving to SC Villa in 2018.

=== SC Villa (2018–2021) ===
Owori joined SC Villa in 2018, and established himself as a versatile squad member, capable of playing across midfield and defence.

=== Move to Europe (2021–2023) ===
In 2021, Owori signed for Spanish side Vélez CF and was an unused substitute during the Copa del Rey. The following year, he moved to Sweden to join Utsiktens BK in the Superettan, making one league appearance.

=== Return to SC Villa (2023–2026) ===
Owori rejoined SC Villa in February 2023. In February 2025, he extended his contract for two years until January 2027. He was instrumental in helping the club win the Uganda Premier League title, their first in 20 years.

== International career ==
Owori represented Uganda at youth level, but never made his senior debut for the Uganda national team. He was an unused substitute during 2021 Africa Cup of Nations qualification.

== Style of play ==
Owori was primarily a central midfielder but could also operate as a right back or wide midfielder. He was known for his work ethic, tactical discipline, and versatility.

== Death ==
On 5 August 2026, Owori died at a clinic from injuries sustained during an attack near his home in Makindye, Kampala, at the age of 27, after resisting an attempt to steal his mobile phone and other belongings. Witnesses said a group of suspected robbers hit him with paving stones before robbing Owori of his belongings and fleeing, leaving him unconscious.

== Career statistics ==
Club

- SC Villa (2024–25): 27 appearances, 2 goals
- SC Villa (2025–26): 26 appearances, 0 goals
- CAF Champions League: 2 appearances
- Utsiktens BK (Superettan, 2022): 1 appearance, 0 goals
