= Eric Mbirizi =

Burundian association football player

Personal information
- Date of birth: 20 April 1998 (age 28)
- Position: Midfielder

Team information
- Current team: Al Merreikh Juba

Senior career*
Years	Team	Apps	(Gls)
2015–2016	Atlético Olympic		
2016–2018	Bujumbura City		
2018–2019	Stand United		
2019–2021	Inter Star		
2021–2022	Le Messager		
2022–2023	Rayon Sports		
2023–2024	Gosogi United		
2024	Kiyovu Sports		
2025	Rukinzo		
2025–	Al Merreikh Juba		

International career^{‡}
2019	Burundi U20	2	(0)
2017–2022	Burundi	2	(0)
- * Club domestic league appearances and goals as of 21:11, 11 February 2026 (UTC) ‡ National team caps and goals as of 21:11, 11 February 2026 (UTC)

Eric Mbirizi (born 20 April 1998) is a Burundian international footballer who plays as a midfielder for South Sudan Premier League club Al Merreikh Juba.

== Club career ==
Mbirizi moved from Le Messager in his native Burundi to Rwandan club Rayon Sports for 15 million Rwandan Franc. However, after just a year with the club, he was released in August 2023. After a spell with Gosogi United, he joined Kiyovu Sports in August 2024, and after impressive performances, he was linked with a move to Sudanese club Al Merrikh, who were playing in the Mauritanian Super D1 at the time.

== International career ==
Mbirizi was first called up to the Burundi senior squad in 2016 in preparation for the 2016 CECAFA Cup. After the competition was cancelled, he was called up once more in January 2017, but would have to wait until March to make his debut, which came in a 1–0 friendly win over Djibouti. His next call-up came ahead of 2022 African Nations Championship qualification games, but his appearance in Burundi's 2–1 defeat to Djibouti would prove to be his last.

== International statistics ==
As of 2026.

National team	Year	Apps	Goals
Burundi	2017	1	0
Burundi	2022	1	0
Total		2	0
