= Athuman Idd =

Tanzanian footballer

Personal information
- Full name: Athuman Idd Chuji
- Date of birth: 18 February 1988 (age 38)
- Place of birth: Dar es Salaam, Tanzania
- Height: 1.75 m (5 ft 9 in)
- Position: Midfielder

Senior career*
Years	Team	Apps	(Gls)
2004–2006	Simba SC		
2006–?	Young Africans FC		

International career
2004–2013	Tanzania	36	(2)
- * Club domestic league appearances and goals

Athuman Idd Chuji (born 18 February 1988) is a Tanzanian former footballer who played as a midfielder.
