= Kevin Ndayisenga =

Burundian footballer

Personal information
- Date of birth: 30 January 1995 (age 31)
- Place of birth: Bujumbura, Burundi
- Height: 1.82 m (6 ft 0 in)
- Position: Striker

Team information
- Current team: Jomo Cosmos F.C.
- Number: 12

Senior career*
Years	Team	Apps	(Gls)
2011–2014	Atlético Olympic FC		
2014–2016	Bujumbura City		
2016–	Jomo Cosmos F.C.	9	(2)

International career
2011–	Burundi	2	(0)
- * Club domestic league appearances and goals

Kevin 'Dambo' Ndayisenga (born 30 January 1995 in Bujumbura) is a Burundian professional footballer who operates as striker for Jomo Cosmos F.C.

== Club career ==
In 2015, he was on the verge of signing for Simba S.C.

Vowing to assist Jomo Cosmos F.C. in their promotion objective just after his arrival, he is seen by some as a replacement for scorer Charlton Mashumba.

Returning to Burundi for a few months to resolve a work permit problem, he went back to South Africa, playing his first game fronting AmaZulu F.C. where he scored. Severely injured for a month, Kevin was fully recovered by March 2017 and returned to play.

== Personal life ==
For his delectation, Ndayisenga plays PlayStation and listens to music.
