= Jérémie Basilua =

Congolese footballer

Personal information
- Full name: Jérémie Basilua Makola
- Date of birth: 22 April 1993 (age 33)

Senior career*
Years	Team	Apps	(Gls)
- AS Vita Club

International career^{‡}
2012–	DR Congo	1	(1)
- * Club domestic league appearances and goals ‡ National team caps and goals as of 21 April 2017

Jérémie Basilua is a Congolese international football player.

He scored against the Seychelles on 29 February 2012.

He was named in the Congolese squad for the 2013 African Youth Championship.

== International career ==
=== International goals ===
Scores and results list DR Congo's goal tally first.

No	Date	Venue	Opponent	Score	Result	Competition
1.	29 February 2012	Stade Linité, Victoria, Seychelles	Seychelles	4–0	4–0	2013 Africa Cup of Nations qualification
