= 2009 Kagame Interclub Cup =

2009 Kagame Inter-Club Cup
CECAFA Club Cup
- CECAFA Club Cup 2009 Logo

Tournament details
- Host country: Sudan
- Cities: Khartoum and Port Sudan
- Dates: 30 June - 12 July 2009
- Teams: 12 (from 1 confederation)
- Venues: 3 (in 2 host cities)

Final positions
- Champions: (Rwanda) Atraco (1st title)
- Runners-up: (Sudan) Al-Merreikh
- Third place: (Democratic Republic of the Congo) TP Mazembe

Tournament statistics
- Matches played: 26
- Goals scored: 99 (3.81 per match)
- Top scorer(s): (Nigeria) Endurance Idahor (Democratic Republic of the Congo) Mulota Kabangu (6 goals)
- All statistics correct as of 13 July 2009.

The CECAFA organised Kagame inter club cup is an association football competition that is contested between the champions of the CECAFA affiliated countries plus one guest team.

The 2009 contest will take place between 30 June and 12 July 2009. The Tournament was originally scheduled to be held in Uganda, however the Ugandan authorities did not have the necessary money to host the event and it was handed to Sudan.

== Participants ==
- (Tanzania) Prisons FC (Note: Prisons FC take the place of Yanga Sports, who were banned for three years for not turning up to play in the third place play off in 2008.)
- (Uganda) Kampala City Council
- (Somalia) Banaadir Telecom FC
- (Burundi) AS Inter Star
- (Zanzibar) Miembeni
- (Rwanda) Atraco
- (Djibouti) Kartileh (Note: Kartileh were invited despite being narrowly avoiding relegation in the Djibouti league.)
- (Kenya) Tusker
- (Kenya) Mathare United
- (Democratic Republic of the Congo) TP Mazembe (Note: TP Mazember were invited guests.)
- (Sudan) Al-Merreikh
- (Sudan) Hay Al-Arab

== Officials ==
Referees

- (Rwanda) Munyemana Hudu
- (Burkina Faso) Aime Ndayisenga
- (Djibouti) Ali Farah
- (Kenya) Caleb Amwayi
- (Sudan) Hussein El Fadil
- (Sudan) Rassa Librato
- (Tanzania) Charles Mbaga
- (Uganda) Mufta Ngobi

Assistant Referees

- (Burkina Faso) Charles Nimpagaritse
- (Djibouti) Egueh Yacin Hassan
- (Kenya) Rage Aden Marwa
- (Somalia) Hassan Fido
- (Sudan) Khalafala Abdel Aziz
- (Sudan) Mohammed Aarif
- (Uganda) Samuel Kayondo
- (Zanzibar) Ali Kombo

== Group stage ==
=== Group A ===
Team	Pld	W	D	L	GF	GA	GD	Pts
(Sudan) Al-Merreikh	3	3	0	0	13	2	+11	9
(Kenya) Mathare United	3	2	0	1	5	2	+3	6
(Rwanda) Atraco	3	1	0	2	8	8	0	3
(Djibouti) Kartileh	3	0	0	3	1	15	−14	0

30 June 2009
17:00

Mathare United (Kenya)	3 – 0	(Djibouti) Kartileh
Crispine Ochieng 32'; Jafar Gichuki 52'; Anthony Kimani Wanjohi 70'

Port Sudan

30 June 2009
20:30

Al-Merreikh (Sudan)	6 – 1	(Rwanda) Atraco
Idahor 31' 44'; Nasreldin Alshigail 38'; Galag 45'; Agab 85'; Tambal 89'	BBC Sport	Joseph Kabagambe 50'

Port Sudan

2 July 2009
18:00

Mathare United (Kenya)	2 – 1	(Rwanda) Atraco
Crispine Ochieng 78'; Kevin Oliech 90'		Mike Ssebalinga 12'

Port Sudan

2 July 2009
20:00

Kartileh (Djibouti)	1 – 6	(Sudan) Al-Merreikh
Souleyman Ahmed 37'		Idahor 10'; Ammari 38' 48'; Galag 47'; Osunwa 88' 89'

Port Sudan

4 July 2009
18:00

Atraco (Rwanda)	6 – 0	(Djibouti) Kartileh
Jean Shyaka 42' 45'; Hamisi Kitagenda 47' 50'; Abedi Mulenda 48'; 90+3'

Port Sudan

4 July 2009
20:00

Mathare United (Kenya)	0 – 1	(Sudan) Al-Merreikh
		Agab

Port Sudan

=== Group B ===
Team	Pld	W	D	L	GF	GA	GD	Pts
(Uganda) Kampala City Council	3	3	0	0	11	4	+7	9
(Democratic Republic of the Congo) TP Mazembe	3	2	0	1	13	4	+9	6
(Tanzania) Prisons FC	3	0	1	2	3	8	−5	1
(Somalia) Banaadir Telecom FC	3	0	1	2	4	15	−11	1

1 July 2009
18:00

Prisons FC (Tanzania)	2 – 2	(Somalia) Banaadir Telecom FC
John Matei 18'; Said Mtupa 49'		Nur Hussein 38'; Kevin Kimani 43'

Khartoum

1 July 2009
20:00

TP Mazembe (Democratic Republic of the Congo)	2 – 3	(Uganda) Kampala City Council

Khartoum

3 July 2009
18:00

Kampala City Council (Uganda)	3 – 1	(Tanzania) Prisons FC

Khartoum

3 July 2009
20:00

Banaadir Telecom FC (Somalia)	1 – 8	(Democratic Republic of the Congo) TP Mazembe

Khartoum

5 July 2009
18:00

Kampala City Council (Uganda)	5 – 1	(Somalia) Banaadir Telecom FC

Khartoum

5 July 2009
20:00

TP Mazembe (Democratic Republic of the Congo)	3 – 0	(Tanzania) Prisons FC

Khartoum

=== Group C ===
Team	Pld	W	D	L	GF	GA	GD	Pts
(Sudan) Hay Al-Arab	3	1	2	0	4	2	+2	5
(Kenya) Tusker	3	1	1	1	8	2	+6	4
(Burundi) AS Inter Star	3	1	1	1	4	4	0	4
(Zanzibar) Miembeni	3	1	0	2	2	9	−7	3

1 July 2009
18:00

AS Inter Star (Burundi)	1 – 2 (Note: After the second Inter Star goal, five Miembeni players left the pitch pretending to be injured in order to force a replay. The result stood, and Miembeni were banned by CECAFA for five years.)	(Zanzibar) Miembeni

Port Sudan

1 July 2009
20:00

Hay al-Arab (Sudan)	1 – 1	(Kenya) Tusker

Port Sudan

3 July 2009
18:00

Miembeni (Zanzibar)	0 – 6	(Kenya) Tusker

Port Sudan

3 July 2009
20:00

AS Inter Star (Burundi)	1 – 1	(Sudan) Hay al-Arab

Port Sudan

5 July 2009
18:00

Tusker (Kenya)	1 – 2	(Burundi) AS Inter Star

Port Sudan

5 July 2009
20:00

Hay al-Arab (Sudan)	2 – 0	(Zanzibar) Miembeni
Ahmed Saad 6' (2H)

Port Sudan

== Knockout stage ==
All times are East Africa Time (UTC+3)

The teams finishing the group stage in first and second position qualify for the quarter final stage. In addition, the best two third placed teams will also qualify.

Quarter-finals
7 July
(Sudan) Al-Merreikh	2
(Burundi) AS Inter Star	0
7 July
(Sudan) Hay Al-Arab	1
(Democratic Republic of the Congo) TP Mazembe	6
8 July
(Uganda) Kampala City Council	0
(Rwanda) Atraco	4
8 July
(Kenya) Tusker	1(2)
(Kenya) Mathare United (pen.)	1(3)

Semi-finals
9 July
(Sudan) Al-Merreikh (a.e.t.)	2
(Democratic Republic of the Congo) TP Mazembe	1
10 July
(Rwanda) Atraco (a.e.t.)	2
(Kenya) Mathare United	1

Final
12 July
(Sudan) Al-Merreikh	0
(Rwanda) Atraco	1
Third place
12 July
(Democratic Republic of the Congo) TP Mazembe	2
(Kenya) Mathare United	0

=== Quarter-finals ===
7 July 2009

Al-Merreikh (Sudan)	2 – 0	(Burundi) AS Inter Star

St Merreikh

7 July 2009

Hay Al-Arab (Sudan)	1 – 6	(Democratic Republic of the Congo) TP Mazembe

St Merreikh

8 July 2009

Kampala City Council (Uganda)	0 – 4	(Rwanda) Atraco

St Merreikh

8 July 2009

Tusker (Kenya)	1 – 1 (2–3p)	(Kenya) Mathare United

St Merreikh

=== Semi-finals ===
9 July 2009

Al-Merreikh (Sudan)	2 – 1 (a.e.t.)	(Democratic Republic of the Congo) TP Mazembe

St Merreikh

10 July 2009

Atraco (Rwanda)	2 – 1 (a.e.t.)	(Kenya) Mathare United

St Merreikh

=== Third Place Play off ===
12 July 2009

Mathare United (Kenya)	0 – 2	(Democratic Republic of the Congo) TP Mazembe
	Report

=== Final ===
12 July 2009

Al-Merreikh (Sudan)	0 – 1	(Rwanda) Atraco
	Report	Hamisi Gitagenda 15'

Kagame Inter-Club Cup
2009 winners

== Leading goal scorers ==
Player	Club	Goals
(Nigeria) Endurance Idahor	(Sudan) Al-Merreikh	6
(Democratic Republic of the Congo) Mulota Kabangu	(Democratic Republic of the Congo) TP Mazembe	6
