= 2018 Kagame Interclub Cup =

CECAFA Kagame Cup

Tournament details
- Host country: Tanzania
- Dates: June 29–July 13
- Teams: 12
- Venues: 2 (in 1 host city)

Final positions
- Champions: (Tanzania) Azam
- Runners-up: (Tanzania) Simba
- Third place: (Kenya) Gor Mahia
- Fourth place: (Zanzibar) JKU

Tournament statistics
- Matches played: 26
- Goals scored: 70 (2.69 per match)

The 2018 Kagame Interclub Cup was the 41st edition of the Kagame Interclub Cup, a football competition for clubs in East and Central Africa, which is organised by CECAFA. It took place in Tanzania from 29 June to 13 July 2018.

All times shown are in East Africa Time (UTC+3).

== Participants ==
The following 12 clubs took part in the competition:

Group A

- (Tanzania) Azam
- (Uganda) Vipers
- (Zanzibar) JKU
- (South Sudan) Kator

Group B

- (Rwanda) Rayon Sports
- (Kenya) Gor Mahia
- (Djibouti) AS Port
- (Burundi) LLB Académic

Group C

- (Tanzania) Simba
- (Rwanda) A.P.R.
- (Somalia) Dekedaha
- (Tanzania) Singida United

== Officials ==
Referees

- Omar Abdulkadir Artan (Somalia)
- Louis Hakizimana (Rwanda)
- Peter Waweru (Kenya)
- Ssali Mashood (Uganda)
- Emmanuel Mwandembwa (Tanzania)
- Saddam Houssein Mansour (Djibouti)
- (Burkina Faso) Thierry Nkurunziza (Burundi)
- Ring Nyier Akech Malong (South Sudan)
- Ali Mfaume Nassoro (Zanzibar)

Assistant Referees

- Hamza Haji Abdi (Somalia)
- Theogene Ndagijimana (Rwanda)
- Gilbert Cheruiyot (Kenya)
- Tony Kidiya (Kenya)
- Dick Okello (Uganda)
- Salah Abdi Mohamed (Djibouti)
- (Burkina Faso) Willy Habimana (Burundi)
- Gasim Madir Dehiya (South Sudan)
- Mohamed Mkono (Tanzania)

== Group stage ==
Tie-breaking criteria for group play
The ranking of teams in each group was based on the following criteria:
1. Number of points obtained in games between the teams involved
2. Goal difference in games between the teams involved
3. Goals scored in games between the teams involved
4. Away goals scored in games between the teams involved
5. Goal difference in all games
6. Goals scored in all games
7. Drawing of lots

The group stage featured twelve teams, with 4 teams in Group A, Group B and C. Two teams from Group A and B and Group C advanced to the knockout stage.

=== Group A ===
Team	Pld	W	D	L	GF	GA	GD	Pts
(Tanzania) Azam	3	2	1	0	5	3	+2	7
(Uganda) Vipers	3	1	2	0	5	2	+3	5
(Zanzibar) JKU	3	1	1	1	4	3	+1	4
(South Sudan) Kator	3	0	0	3	1	7	−6	0

29 June 2018
13:00

JKU (Zanzibar)	1–1	(Uganda) Vipers
Musa 16'		Sserunkuma 55'

Chamazi Stadium, Dar es Salaam
Referee: Louis Hakizimana (Rwanda)
29 June 2018
16:00

Azam (Tanzania)	2–1	(South Sudan) Kator

Chamazi Stadium, Dar es Salaam
Referee: Omar Abdulkadir Artan (Somalia)

1 July 2018
16:00

JKU (Zanzibar)	2–0	(South Sudan) Kator

Chamazi Stadium, Dar es Salaam
Referee: Saddam Houssein Mansour (Djibouti)
1 July 2018
19:00

Azam (Tanzania)	1–1	(Uganda) Vipers

Chamazi Stadium, Dar es Salaam
Referee: Thierry Nkurunziza (Burundi)

4 July 2018
19:00

Vipers (Uganda)	3–0	(South Sudan) Kator

National Stadium, Dar es Salaam
Referee: Louis Hakizimana (Rwanda)
4 July 2018
19:00

Azam (Tanzania)	2–1	(Zanzibar) JKU

Chamazi Stadium, Dar es Salaam
Referee: Peter Waweru (Kenya)

=== Group B ===
Team	Pld	W	D	L	GF	GA	GD	Pts
(Kenya) Gor Mahia	3	1	2	0	4	2	+2	5
(Rwanda) Rayon Sports	3	1	2	0	5	3	+2	5
(Djibouti) AS Port	3	1	1	1	2	3	−1	4
(Burundi) LLB Académic	3	0	1	2	2	5	−3	1

30 June 2018
16:00

LLB Académic (Burundi)	1–2	(Djibouti) AS Port

Chamazi Stadium, Dar es Salaam
Referee: Emmanuel Mwandembwa (Tanzania)
1 July 2018
14:00

Rayon Sports (Rwanda)	2–2	(Kenya) Gor Mahia
		Tuyisenge 33'; Mieno 40'

National Stadium, Dar es Salaam
Referee: Ali Mfaume Nassoro (Zanzibar)

3 July 2018
14:00

Rayon Sports (Rwanda)	1–1	(Djibouti) AS Port

Chamazi Stadium, Dar es Salaam
Referee: Emmanuel Mwandembwa (Tanzania)
3 July 2018
16:00

LLB Académic (Burundi)	2–2	(Kenya) Gor Mahia

Chamazi Stadium, Dar es Salaam
Referee: Omar Abdulkadir Artan (Somalia)

5 July 2018
18:00

Gor Mahia (Kenya)	2–0	(Djibouti) AS Port

National Stadium, Dar es Salaam
Referee: Ssali Mashood (Uganda)
5 July 2018
18:00

Rayon Sports (Rwanda)	3–1	(Burundi) LLB Académic

Chamazi Stadium, Dar es Salaam
Referee: Omar Abdulkadir Artan (Somalia)

=== Group C ===
Team	Pld	W	D	L	GF	GA	GD	Pts
(Tanzania) Simba	3	2	1	0	7	2	+5	7
(Tanzania) Singida United	3	2	1	0	4	2	+2	7
(Rwanda) A.P.R.	3	1	0	2	6	5	+1	3
(Somalia) Dekedaha	3	0	0	3	1	9	−8	0

29 June 2018
19:00

Singida United (Tanzania)	2–1	(Rwanda) A.P.R.

National Stadium, Dar es Salaam
Referee: Peter Waweru (Kenya)
30 June 2018
14:00

Simba (Tanzania)	4–0	(Somalia) Dekedaha

National Stadium, Dar es Salaam
Referee: Ssali Mashood (Uganda)

2 July 2018
14:00

Singida United (Tanzania)	1–0	(Somalia) Dekedaha

Chamazi Stadium, Dar es Salaam
Referee: Ring Nyier Akech Malong (South Sudan)
2 July 2018
16:00

Simba (Tanzania)	2–1	(Rwanda) A.P.R.

National Stadium, Dar es Salaam
Referee: Ssali Mashood (Uganda)

4 July 2018
16:00

Simba (Tanzania)	1–1	(Tanzania) Singida United

National Stadium, Dar es Salaam
Referee: Ring Nyier Akech Malong (South Sudan)
4 July 2018
16:00

A.P.R. (Rwanda)	4–1	(Somalia) Dekedaha

Chamazi Stadium, Dar es Salaam
Referee: Ali Mfaume Nassoro (Zanzibar)

== Knockout stage ==
=== Quarter-finals ===
8 July 2018
16:00

Gor Mahia (Kenya)	2–1	(Uganda) Vipers

National Stadium, Dar es Salaam
Referee: Emmanuel Mwandembwa (Tanzania)

8 July 2018
19:00

Simba (Tanzania)	1–0	(Djibouti) AS Port
Mohamed Rashid 64'

National Stadium, Dar es Salaam
Referee: Peter Waweru (Kenya)

9 July 2018
16:00

Azam (Tanzania)	4–2	(Rwanda) Rayon Sports
Shabani Iddi 18' 33' 39' 64'		Rwatubyaye Abdul 42', Manishimwe Djabel 81'

National Stadium, Dar es Salaam
Referee: Saddam Houssein Mansour (Djibouti)

9 July 2018
19:00

Singida United (Tanzania)	0–0	(Zanzibar) JKU
	(shootout:3-4)

National Stadium, Dar es Salaam
Referee: Thierry Nkurunziza (Burundi)

=== Semi-finals ===
11 July 2018
16:00

Gor Mahia (Kenya)	0–2 (aet)	(Tanzania) Azam
		Nchimbi 92', Bruce Kangwa 100'

National Stadium, Dar es Salaam
Referee: Louis Hakizimana (Rwanda)

11 July 2018
19:00

Simba (Tanzania)	1–0	(Zanzibar) JKU
Kagere Meddie 44'

National Stadium, Dar es Salaam
Referee: Omar Abdulkadir Artan (Somalia)

=== Third place play-off ===
13 July 2018
14:00

Gor Mahia (Kenya)	2–0	(Zanzibar) JKU
Francis Mustapha 32', Samuel Onyango 89'

National Stadium, Dar es Salaam
Referee: Ring Nyier Akech Malong (South Sudan)

=== Final ===
13 July 2018
16:00

Simba (Tanzania)	1–2	(Tanzania) Azam
Kagere Meddie 63'		Shabani Iddi 33', Aggrey Moris 69'

National Stadium, Dar es Salaam
Referee: Thierry Nkurunziza (Burundi)

2018 Kagame Interclub Cup champions

2nd title
