= Stephano Mwasika =

Tanzanian footballer

Personal information
- Full name: Stephano Asangalwisye Mwasika
- Date of birth: 1 September 1987 (age 39)
- Place of birth: Mbeya, Tanzania
- Height: 1.80 m (5 ft 11 in)
- Position: Defender

Senior career*
Years	Team	Apps	(Gls)
2007–2008	Prisons		
2008–2010	Moro United		
2010–2013	Young Africans		
2013–2015	Ruvu Shooting		
2015–2017	Friends Rangers		
2007–2008	KMC FC		
2018	Namungo		
2019	African Lyon		

International career^{‡}
2007–2012	Tanzania	18	(0)
- * Club domestic league appearances and goals as of 1 August 2020 ‡ National team caps and goals as of 1 August 2020

Stephano Mwasika (born 1 September 1987) is a retired Tanzanian football defender.
