= ATRACO F.C. =

Rwandan football club

ATRACO FC
- Full name: Association of Transport Companies
- Dissolved: 2010
- Ground: Kigali, Rwanda
- Manager: Sam Timbe
- League: Primus National Soccer League

ATRACO FC was a football club from Kigali in Rwanda. It won the Rwandan Premier League in 2008. It was the club of the Association of Transport Companies, which had been dissolved in 2011. The 2009–10 season was the last played by the team, which finished in second place.

== Honours ==
=== Domestic competitions ===
- Rwandan Premier League: 1

2008

- Rwandan Cup: 1

2009

=== International ===
- Kagame Interclub Cup: 1

2009

== Performance in CAF competitions ==
- CAF Champions League: 1 appearance

2009 – Preliminary Round

- CAF Confederation Cup: 2 appearances

2007 – First Round of 16
2010 – Preliminary Round
