= 2008 Kagame Interclub Cup =

The CECAFA Club Cup is a football club tournament organised by CECAFA. It has been known as the Kagame Interclub Cup since 2002, when Rwandan President Paul Kagame began sponsoring the competition. It is contested by clubs from East and Central Africa.

== Participants ==
- (Rwanda) APR
- (Ethiopia) Awassa Kenema
- (Somalia) Banaadir Telecom FC
- (Zanzibar) Miembeni
- (Rwanda) Rayon Sport
- (Tanzania) Simba
- (Kenya) Tusker FC
- Uganda Revenue Authority SC
- (Burundi) Vital'ô
- (Tanzania) Young Africans

== Group stage ==
=== Group A ===
Team	Pld	W	D	L	GF	GA	GD	Pts
(Tanzania) Simba	3	2	0	1	8	4	+4	6
(Kenya) Tusker FC	3	2	0	1	9	5	+4	6
(Burundi) Vital'ô	3	1	0	2	4	4	0	3
(Somalia) Banaadir Telecom FC	3	1	0	2	3	11	−8	3

12 July 2008
20:00

Simba (Tanzania)	2 – 3	(Kenya) Tusker FC
Ulimboka Mwakingwe 21'; Adan Kingwande 31'		Simon Mburu 9'; Oscar Kadenge 45'; John Keo 53'

Dar es Salaam

14 July 2008
19:00

Vital'ô (Burundi)	1 – 2	(Somalia) Banaadir Telecom FC
Kabungulu Nimubona 89'		Ivan Edward 59'; Nune Abdi 90+1'

Dar es Salaam

16 July 2008
17:30

Tusker FC (Kenya)	1 – 3	(Burundi) Vital'ô
Kenneth Wendo 69'		Eric Catoto 16'; Kabungulu Nimubona 30'; Stanley Minzi 67'

Dar es Salaam

17 July 2008
20:00

Simba (Tanzania)	5 – 1	(Somalia) Banaadir Telecom FC
Mussa Hassan 45+2' 71'; Adan Kingwande 60'; Ulimboka Mwakingwe 67'; Emeh Izechukwu 87'		Nune Abdi 38'

Dar es Salaam

20 July 2008
18:30

Banaadir Telecom FC (Somalia)	0 – 5	(Kenya) Tusker FC
		John Njoroge 14'; Joseph Shikokoti 22'; Jeff Oyando 73'; Kenneth Wendo 76'; Osborne Monday 83' (pen.)

Dar es Salaam

20 July 2008
20:30

Vital'ô (Burundi)	0 – 1	(Tanzania) Simba
		Kevin Yondan 43'

Dar es Salaam

== Group B ==
Team	Pld	W	D	L	GF	GA	GD	Pts
Uganda Revenue Authority	2	1	1	0	5	2	+3	4
(Rwanda) Rayon Sport	2	1	0	1	3	4	−1	3
(Ethiopia) Awassa Kenema	2	0	1	1	1	3	−2	1

13 July 2008
20:00

Uganda Revenue Authority	4 – 1	(Rwanda) Rayon Sport
Johnson Bagole 31' 48'; Robert Okello 69'; John Obua 85'		Jimmy Gatete 90'

Morogoro

16 July 2008
19:00

Awassa Kenema (Ethiopia)	1 – 1	Uganda Revenue Authority
Fitsum Tsegazab 86'		Johnson Bagole 26'

Morogoro

19 July 2008
19:00

Rayon Sport (Rwanda)	2 – 0	(Ethiopia) Awassa Kenema
Jean Lomani 15'; Kalissa Kasse 83'

Morogoro

== Group C ==
Team	Pld	W	D	L	GF	GA	GD	Pts
(Tanzania) Young Africans	2	1	1	0	3	2	+1	4
(Zanzibar) Miembeni	2	1	0	1	2	2	0	3
(Rwanda) APR	2	0	1	1	3	4	−1	1

13 July 2008
17:30

Young Africans (Tanzania)	2 – 2	(Rwanda) APR
Mrisho Ngassa 65'; Jerry Tegete 69'		Mbuyu Twite 15' 79'

Morogoro

15 July 2008
18:30

APR (Rwanda)	1 – 2	(Zanzibar) Miembeni
Baptiste Mugiraneza 87'		Amri Kiemba 42'; Maulid Ibrahim 72'

Morogoro

19 July 2008
17:00

Miembeni (Zanzibar)	0 – 1	(Tanzania) Young Africans
		Kigi Makasi 22' (pen.)

Morogoro

== Third Place Playoff ==
27 July

(Tanzania) Simba	w/o	(Tanzania) Young Africans

Tanzania National Stadium, Dar es Salaam

== Final ==
27 July

Uganda Revenue Authority SC	1 – 2	(Kenya) Tusker FC
Martin Muwanga 23'		Joseph Shikokoti 71'; Oscar Kadenge 88'

Tanzania National Stadium, Dar es Salaam
