= Augustine Nsumba =

Ugandan footballer (born 1987)

Personal information
- Date of birth: 7 December 1987 (age 38)
- Place of birth: Mukono District, Uganda
- Height: 1.61 m (5 ft 3 in)
- Position: Midfielder

Senior career*
| Years | Team | Apps | (Gls) |
| 2004–2006 | Villa | | |
| 2007–2009 | ÍBV | | |
| 2010–2014 | URA | | |
| 2015 | Villa | | |
| 2015–2017 | BUL | | |

International career^{‡}
| 2006–2007 | Uganda | 8 | (0) |
- * Club domestic league appearances and goals as of 13 August 2024 ‡ National team caps and goals as of 13 August 2024

Augustine Nsumba (born 7 December 1987) is an Ugandan former footballer who played as a midfielder.

== Early life ==
Nsumba was born on 7 December 1987 in Mukono District, Uganda. He attended primary school in Mukono District, Uganda. After that, he attended Old Kampala Senior Secondary school in Uganda. He was regarded as an Uganda prospect. He received comparisons to Argentina international Lionel Messi.

== Club career ==
Nsumba started his career with Ugandan side Villa. He was regarded as one of the club's most important players. He helped the club win the league. In 2007, he signed for Icelandic side ÍBV. He helped the club win the league. In 2010, he signed for Ugandan side URA. He helped the club win the league. In 2015, he returned to Ugandan side Villa. After that, he signed for Ugandan side BUL. He captained the club.

== International career ==
Nsumba was a Uganda international. On 26 July 2006, he debuted for the Uganda national football team during a 1–1 draw with Rwanda. He played for the Uganda national football team at the 2006 CECAFA Cup.

== Style of play ==
Nsumba mainly operated as a midfielder. He specifically operated as an attacking midfielder. He could also operate as a forward. He was known for his versatility.

== Personal life ==
After retiring from professional football, Nsumba worked as a football manager. His playing career was regarded to have been affected by injuries and weight gain.
