= 1982 in association football =

The following are the worldwide association football events of the year 1982.

== Events ==
- February 7 – The first ever Arab Club Champions Cup is completed, with Al-Shorta of Iraq winning the title with a 4–2 aggregate win over Al-Nejmeh of Lebanon.
- March 14 – Johannes Atlason makes his debut as the manager of Iceland, when the team draws (0-0) against Kuwait.
- May 26 – European Cup won by Aston Villa after defeating Bayern Munich 1-0 in Rotterdam, Netherlands.
- June 13 – The 1982 FIFA World Cup kicks off in Spain. For the first time, 24 teams compete in the final tournament, with the competition eventually won by Italy.
- June 30 – Dutch club SC Amersfoort is disestablished due to financial problems.
- September 15 – HFC Haarlem makes a winning European debut with by defeating Belgium's AA Gent (2-1) in the first round of the UEFA Cup. The goals for the Dutch side are scored by Gerrie Kleton and Martin Haar.
- October 20 – 66 fans lost their life in the Luzhniki disaster during the UEFA Cup second round match between FC Spartak Moscow and HFC Haarlem in Moscow.
- November 30 – Copa Libertadores won by Peñarol after defeating Cobreloa on an aggregate score of 1-0.

== Winners club national championship ==
=== Asia ===
- Qatar – Al-Rayyan

=== Europe ===
- Belgium – Standard Liège
- Bulgaria – CSKA Sofia
- Czechoslovakia – Dukla Prague
- Denmark – Odense Boldklub
- East Germany – Berliner FC Dynamo
- England – Liverpool
- Finland – FC Kuusysi
- France – AS Monaco
- Greece – Olympiacos
- Italy – Juventus
- Netherlands – Ajax Amsterdam
- Poland – Widzew Łódź
- Portugal – Sporting CP
- Scotland – Celtic
- Soviet Union – Dinamo Minsk
- Spain – Real Sociedad
- Switzerland – Grasshopper Club Zürich
- Turkey – Beşiktaş
- West Germany – Hamburger SV
- Yugoslavia – Dinamo Zagreb

=== North America ===
- Mexico – UNAL
- United States / Canada:
  - New York Cosmos (NASL)

=== Oceania ===
- Australia – Sydney City

=== South America ===
- Argentina
  - Metropolitano – Estudiantes
  - Nacional – Ferro Carril Oeste
- Bolivia – Bolívar
- Brazil – Flamengo
- Colombia – América de Cali
- Paraguay – Olimpia Asunción

== International Tournaments ==
- British Home Championship (February 23 – May 29)

England

- African Cup of Nations in Libya (March 5–19)
  - (gold) Ghana
  - (silver) Libya
  - (bronze) Zambia
- FIFA World Cup in Spain (June 13 – July 11)
  - (gold) Italy
  - (silver) West Germany
  - (bronze) Poland
- UEFA U-16 European Championship in Italy (May 5–7)
  - (gold) Italy
  - (silver) West Germany
  - (bronze) Yugoslavia
- UEFA U-18 European Championship in Finland
  - (gold) Scotland
  - (silver) Czechoslovakia
- UEFA U-21 European Championship
  1. England
  2. West Germany

== National Teams ==
=== Netherlands ===
Date	Opponent	Final Score	Result	Competition	Venue
March 23	Scotland	2 – 1	L	Friendly	Hampden Park, Glasgow
April 14	Greece	1 – 0	W	Friendly	Philips Stadion, Eindhoven
May 25	England	2 – 0	L	Friendly	Wembley Stadium, London
September 1	Iceland	1 – 1	D	Euro 1984 Qualifier	Laugardalsvöllur, Reykjavík
September 22	Republic of Ireland	2 – 1	W	Euro 1984 Qualifier	De Kuip, Rotterdam
November 10	France	1 – 2	L	Friendly	De Kuip, Rotterdam
December 19	Malta	0 – 6	W	Euro 1984 Qualifier	Tivoli, Aachen

== Births ==
=== January ===
- January 4 – Richard Logan, English club footballer
- January 7 – Luis Abel Peña, Paraguayan footballer
- January 8 – Emanuele Calaiò, Italian youth international
- January 13 – Olivier Fontenette, French footballer
- January 22 – Fabricio Coloccini, Argentine international footballer
- January 26 – Nabil Dafi, French footballer
- January 31
  - Andreas Görlitz, German international
  - Salvatore Masiello, Italian club footballer
  - Allan McGregor, Scottish international footballer

=== February ===
- February 2 – Rodrigo Palacio, Argentine international footballer
- February 5 – Alimansi Kadogo, Ugandan retired footballer
- February 10 – Jacek Gabrusewicz, Polish footballer
- February 12 – Julius Aghahowa, Nigerian footballer
- February 14 – Daniel Robert, Brazilian professional footballer
- February 16 – Vasilios Genitsaridis, Greek former professional footballer
- February 22 – Matt Woolley, English former professional footballer

=== March ===
- March 18 – Romell Brathwaite, Barbadian international footballer
- March 20 – Carmine Giordano, Italian footballer
- March 23 – Mohammed Einas, Senegalese retired footballer
- March 24 – Tshitenge Mukandila, Congolese footballer (died 2010)

=== April ===
- April 1 – Róbert Vittek, Slovak international footballer
- April 2 – Marco Amelia, Italian international footballer
- April 6 – Nelson Geingob, Namibian former footballer
- April 13 – James Curtis, English former footballer
- April 16 – Fabricio Brandão, retired Brazilian footballer
- April 28 – Álvaro Ricaldi, Bolivian international footballer

=== May ===
- May 5
  - Przemysław Kaźmierczak, Polish international footballer
  - Luka Spetič, Slovenian footballer
- May 17 – Dylan Macallister, Australian soccer player
- May 20 – Petr Čech, Czech international footballer
- May 23 – Anton Khromykh, professional Ukrainian former footballer
- May 29 – Ahmed Tangeaoui, French-Moroccan footballer

=== June ===
- June 4 – Pablo Darío López, Argentine footballer
- June 15 – Katie Chapman, English footballer

=== July ===
- July 2 – Alvito Rodrigues, Indian footballer
- July 4 – Biko Brazil, Dutch former professional footballer
- July 5
  - Fabrício de Souza, Brazilian footballer
  - Julien Féret, French footballer
  - Alberto Gilardino, Italian international footballer
  - Paíto, Mozambican footballer
  - Javier Paredes, Spanish footballer
  - Szabolcs Perenyi, Romanian-Hungarian footballer
- July 7
  - Jan Laštůvka, Czech footballer
  - Brendan McElholm, Northern Irish footballer
- July 8
  - David Kenga, Kenyan footballer
  - Agustín Villar, Spanish footballer
- July 10 – Sebastian Mila, Polish footballer
- July 12
  - Antonio Cassano, Italian international footballer
  - Gerardo Hernández, professional Mexican footballer
- July 14 – Hermán Solíz, Bolivian footballer
- July 15 – Cristian Dănălache, Romanian footballer
- July 16 – Charles Kokougan, French former professional footballer
- July 25 – Ivan Len, Ukrainian professional footballer

=== August ===
- August 2 – Susanna Hansen, Faroese footballer
- August 9 – Nando, Mozambican footballer (d. 2007)
- August 14 – Adrian Woźniczka, Polish former professional footballer
- August 21 – Jayson Trommel, Dutch footballer
- August 24
  - José Bosingwa, Portuguese international
  - Kim Källström, Swedish international
  - Glen Atle Larsen, Norwegian club footballer
- August 28
  - Lee Ayres, professional English footballer
  - Thiago Motta, Brazilian-born Italian international and manager

=== September ===
- September 2 – Alan Tate, English club footballer
- September 12 – Kiran Bechan, Dutch footballer
- September 13 – Andrei Makhayev,former Russian footballer
- September 23 – Alain Yomby, Cameroonian former professional footballer
- September 25 – Szymon Sawala, Polish footballer
- September 26 – František Okoličáni, Slovak footballer
- September 28 – Ahmad Alan, Palestinian former national footballer

=== October ===
- October 6 – Igor Pešić, Serbian footballer
- October 7 – Jermain Defoe, English international footballer
- October 9 – Antonio Manuel Viana Mendonça, Angolan footballer
- October 10 – Sipho Mngomezulu, South African footballer
- October 14 – Hubert Charpentier, French professional footballer
- October 29 – Gerald Gansterer, Austrian footballer

=== November ===
- November 2 – Moreno Esseboom, Dutch footballer
- November 5 – Juan Pablo, Spanish former footballer
- November 14 – Martin Eisl, Austrian professional footballer
- November 17 – Otacílio Mariano Neto, Brazilian footballer

=== December ===
- December 1 – Lloyd Doyley, English-Jamaican footballer and manager
- December 3 – Michael Essien, Ghanaian footballer
- December 8
  - Halil Altıntop, Turkish international footballer
  - Hamit Altıntop, Turkish international footballer
- December 10 – Tomáš Hájovský, Slovak footballer
- December 18 – Stijn Francis, Belgian former footballer
- December 25 – Wencho Farrell, Netherlands Antilles international footballer
- December 27 – Dmitri Rybakin, former Russian professional footballer

== Deaths ==
=== January ===
- January 3 – Fritz Laband, West-German defender, winner of the 1954 FIFA World Cup. (56)

=== August ===
- August 30 - Theodor Reimann (61), Slovak footballer (born 1921)

=== September ===
- September 3 - Hércules de Miranda, Brazilian forward, semi-finalist at the 1938 FIFA World Cup. (70)
- September 14 - Vladislao Cap (48), Argentine footballer and manager (born 1934)

=== November ===
- November 8 - Jimmy Dickinson, English midfielder, England Squad member at the 1950 FIFA World Cup and the 1954 FIFA World Cup. (57, heart attack)
- November 17 - Felix von Heijden (92), Dutch footballer (born 1890)

=== December ===
- December 2 - Giovanni Ferrari, Italian midfielder, winner of the 1934 FIFA World Cup and 1938 FIFA World Cup and winner of the Serie A for a record 8 times as a player. (74)
