= James Curtis =

James Curtis may refer to:

- James Curtis (British writer) (1907–1977), British author
- James Curtis (biographer), American biographer
- James Curtis (journalist) (fl. 1828–1835), British eccentric and journalist
- James Curtis (politician) (died 1819), merchant and political figure in Prince Edward Island
- James C. Curtis (1797–1881), New York politician
- James F. Curtis (1825–1914), vigilante leader in San Francisco and its first Chief of Police
- James F. Curtis (lawyer), U.S. Treasury official
- James L. Curtis (1870–1917), American ambassador
- James O. Curtis (1804–1890), shipbuilder from Medford Massachusetts
- James Waltham Curtis (1839–1901), English-born artist in Australia
- Diego Cortez (born James Curtis, 1946–2021), American filmmaker and art curator
- Kasey James (born 1982), also known as James Curtis, American wrestler
- James Curtis (footballer), English footballer

== See also ==
- James Curtis Hepburn (1815–1911), Christian missionary known for the transliteration of the Japanese language into the Latin alphabet
- James Curtiss (1806–1859), mayor of Chicago
- Jim Curtiss (1861–1945), 19th-century baseball player
