= Sipho (given name) =

Sipho is a South African given name. Notable people with the surname include:

- Sipho Binda (1952–2006), South African military commander
- Sipho Burns-Ncamashe (1920–1996), South African poet, short story writer, and Xhosa imbongi (praise poet)
- Sipho Chaine (born 1996), South African soccer player
- Sipho Dlamini, Swazi Olympic middle-distance runner
- Sipho Gcabashe, South African politician and businessman
- Sipho Gumede (1952–2004), South African jazz musician and composer
- Sipho Hlomuka (born 1980), South African politician
- Sipho Jele, member of the banned Swazi political party
- Sipho Mabona, Swiss origami master
- Sipho Mabuse (born 1951), South African singer-songwriter
- Sipho Mashele (born 1987), South African cricketer
- Sipho Mbatha, South African politician
- Sipho Mbule (born 1998), South African professional soccer player
- Sipho Mchunu (born 1951), South African musician
- Sipho Mfundisi (born 1948), South African politician
- Sipho Mngomezulu (born 1982), South African footballer
- Sipho Moyo, Zimbabwean economist
- Sipho Mumbi (born 1983), Zambian retired footballer
- Sipo Mzimela (1935–2013), South African politician, anti-apartheid activist, and Christian minister
- Sipho Ndlovu (born 1994), Zimbabwean footballer
- Sipho Ngema (1972–2020), South African actor
- Sipho Ngwenya, the first democratically elected mayor of the Greater City of Durban
- Sipho Nkosi, South African politician
- Sipho Philip Mutsi (1967–1985), regional organiser for the Congress of South African Students (COSAS)
- Sipho Sepamla (1932–2007), South African contemporary poet and novelist
- Sipho Sibiya (born 1971), South African retired soccer player
- Sipho Siboza (born 1964), South African politician
- Sipho Thwala, South African rapist and serial killer
- Sipho William Lubisi, South African politician

== Middle name ==
- Baldwin Sipho Ngubane (1941–2021), South African politician
- Cleopas Sipho Dlamini (born 1952), Liswati business executive
- Clint Sipho Sephadi (born 1973), South African retired professional footballer
- Zakhele Sipho Mkhize (born 1950), South African politician
