= 2002–03 Real Valladolid season =

Real Valladolid
2002–03 season
- Manager: José Moré Bonet
- Stadium: Estadio Jose Zorrilla
- La Liga: 14th
- Copa del Rey: Fourth round
- Top goalscorer: David Aganzo (9)

During the 2002–03 Spanish football season, Real Valladolid competed in the La Liga.

== Season summary ==
Valladolid finished the season in 14th position in the La Liga table. In other competitions, Valladolid reached the fourth round of the Copa del Rey.

David Aganzo was the top scorer for Valladolid with 9 goals in all competitions.

== Kit ==
Valladolid's kit was manufactured by British sports retailer Umbro and sponsored by Agroinnova.

== Squad ==
=== Goalkeepers ===
- (Argentina) Albano Bizzarri
- (Spain) Jon Ander
- (Spain) Julio Iglesias

=== Defenders ===
- (Spain) Gaspar
- (Spain) Jonathan
- (Spain) Alberto Marcos Rey
- (Spain) Mario
- (Argentina) Javier Muñoz Mustafá
- (Spain) Óscar Sánchez
- (Bolivia) Juan Manuel Peña
- (Spain) José Luis Santamaría
- (Spain) Javier Torres Gómez

=== Midfielders ===
- (Spain) Abel
- (Spain) Agustín
- (Spain) Antonio López Álvarez
- (Spain) José Luis Caminero
- (Spain) Chema
- (Serbia and Montenegro) Dragan Ćirić
- (Spain) Gonzalo Colsa
- (Spain) Fernando Sales
- (Spain) Javi Jimenez
- (Spain) Jésus
- (Spain) Jorge Manrique
- (Argentina) Pablo Richetti
- (Spain) Xavi Moré

=== Attackers ===
- (Spain) David Aganzo
- (Uruguay) Nicolás Olivera
- (Spain) Óscar González
- (Spain) Pachon
- (Spain) David Sousa
