= Khromykh =

Khromykh (Russian: Хромых, Ukrainian: Хромих) is a surname. It comes from Proto-Slavic *xromъ and means lame, limping. Cognates of Khromykh include Polish Chromy and Czech Chromý.

Khromykh may refer to:

- Anton Khromykh (born 1982), Ukrainian football midfielder
- Maiia Khromykh (born 2006), Russian figure skater
