= Kadogo =

Kadogo is a surname. Notable people with the surname include:

- Aku Kadogo, American choreographer
- Alimansi Kadogo (born 1982), Ugandan footballer
- Veronica Kadogo, (born 1977), Ugandan politician
