= Chromy =

Chromy (feminine: Chroma) is a Polish surname. Chromý (feminine: Chromá) is a Czech surname. They mean 'lame' (unable to walk properly) in West Slavic languages. They are cognates of Khromykh, a surname found in Russia and Ukraine. Notable people with the surname include:

- Adam Chromý (born 1988), Czech orienteering competitor
- Anna Chromy (1940–2021), Czech-German painter and sculptor
- Bronisław Chromy (1925–2017), Polish sculptor
