= Jonathan Martín (footballer) =

Spanish footballer

Personal information
- Full name: Jonathan Martín Carabias
- Date of birth: 6 March 1981 (age 45)
- Place of birth: Salamanca, Spain
- Height: 1.71 m (5 ft 7 1/2 in)
- Position: Centre back

Team information
- Current team: Guijuelo (sporting director)

Senior career*
Years	Team	Apps	(Gls)
1999–2002	Valladolid B		
2002–2005	Valladolid	73	(3)
2005	Cultural Leonesa	6	(0)
2006–2010	Racing Ferrol	132	(16)
2010–2021	Guijuelo	296	(34)

Managerial career
- 2021–: Guijuelo (sporting director)
- * Club domestic league appearances and goals

Jonathan Martín Carabias (born 6 March 1981) is a Spanish football official and a former defender. He is the sporting director for Guijuelo.

== Career statistics ==
=== Club ===
As of match played 14 February 2021

Appearances and goals by club, season and competition
Club	Season	League			National Cup		Other		Total	
Club	Season	Division	Apps	Goals	Apps	Goals	Apps	Goals	Apps	Goals
Valladolid	2002–03	La Liga	16	1	3	0	—		19	1
Valladolid	2003–04	La Liga	31	2	3	0	—		34	2
Valladolid	2004–05	Segunda División	26	0	6	0	—		32	0
Valladolid	Total		73	3	12	0	0	0	85	3
Cultural Leonesa	2005–06	Segunda División B	6	0	0	0	—		6	0
Racing Ferrol	2005–06	Segunda División	18	0	0	0	—		18	0
Racing Ferrol	2006–07	Segunda División B	31	4	1	0	4 (Note: Appearance(s) in Promotion Playoffs)	0	36	4
Racing Ferrol	2007–08	Segunda División	22	3	0	0	—		22	3
Racing Ferrol	2008–09	Segunda División B	29	4	1	0	—		30	4
Racing Ferrol	2009–10	Segunda División B	32	5	0	0	—		32	5
Racing Ferrol	Total		132	16	2	0	4	0	138	16
Guijuelo	2010–11	Segunda División B	34	2	0	0	—		34	2
Guijuelo	2011–12	Segunda División B	33	3	0	0	—		33	3
Guijuelo	2012–13	Segunda División B	12	0	0	0	—		12	0
Guijuelo	2013–14	Segunda División B	35	4	0	0	2	0	37	4
Guijuelo	2014–15	Segunda División B	33	3	1	0	—		34	3
Guijuelo	2015–16	Segunda División B	35	4	2	0	—		37	4
Guijuelo	2016–17	Segunda División B	29	9	4	0	—		33	9
Guijuelo	2017–18	Segunda División B	30	5	0	0	—		30	5
Guijuelo	2018–19	Segunda División B	25	1	0	0	—		25	1
Guijuelo	2019–20	Segunda División B	20	2	0	0	—		20	2
Guijuelo	2020–21	Segunda División B	10	1	0	0	—		10	1
Guijuelo	Total		296	34	7	0	2	0	305	34
Career total			507	53	21	0	6	0	534	53
