= Vasilios Genitsaridis =

Greek footballer

Personal information
- Date of birth: 16 February 1982 (age 44)
- Place of birth: Greece
- Height: 1.82 m (5 ft 11 1/2 in)
- Positions: Defender; midfielder

Senior career*
Years	Team	Apps	(Gls)
2001–2003	Agios Nikolaos		
2003–2005	Apollon Kalamarias	19	(0)
2005–2007	Kalamata	49	(0)
2007–2008	Olympiacos Volos	7	(0)
2008–2009	Kalamata	44	(0)
2009–2010	Atsalenios	25	(4)
2010–2011	Panachaiki	7	(0)
2011	Olympiakos Chersonissos	12	(0)
- * Club domestic league appearances and goals as of 1 July 2011

Vasilios Genitsaridis (Greek: Βασίλειος Γενιτσαρίδης; born 16 February 1982) is a former professional footballer who played as a centre back and defensive midfielder for several clubs in Greece, including a stint with Apollon Kalamarias F.C. in the Alpha Ethniki.

== Career ==
Born in Heraklion, Genitsaridis began playing football with local side Agios Nikolaos F.C. in the Beta Ethniki. In 2003, he signed with Apollon Kalamarias and helped the club gain promotion to the top flight, where he would make eight appearances during the following season.

In June 2010, Genitsaridis signed a two-year contract with Football League 2 side Panachaiki. He left the club six months later, and would finish his career with Olympiakos Chersonissos F.C. in 2011.
