= Ahmad Alan =

Palestinian footballer (born 1982)

Ahmad Alan al-Iwisat (born 28 September 1982) is a Palestinian former national football team player. He is a striker and has 2 caps for the national team.

== See also ==
- Football in Palestine
