= Fabricio Brandão =

Brazilian footballer (born 1982)

Personal information
- Full name: Fabricio Brandão Santos
- Date of birth: 16 April 1982 (age 44)
- Place of birth: Rio de Janeiro, Brazil
- Height: 1.93 m (6 ft 4 in)
- Position: Centre-back

Senior career*
Years	Team	Apps	(Gls)
2003–2004	Botafogo	0	(0)
2005	Grêmio	0	(0)
2006	Boca Júnior		
2007–2008	Benfica Luanda		
2009–2010	Blooming		
2011	San José		
2012–2013	America-RJ		
2013	Petrolero		
2014	Ceres		
2014	Duque de Caxias		
- * Club domestic league appearances and goals

Fabricio Brandão Santos (born 16 April 1982) is a Brazilian former professional footballer who played as a centre-back.
