= Alvito Rodrigues =

Indian footballer

Personal information
- Full name: Alvito Rodrigues
- Date of birth: 2 July 1982 (age 44)
- Place of birth: Goa, India
- Height: 1.71 m (5 ft 7 1/2 in)
- Position: Midfielder

Team information
- Current team: Salgaocar

Senior career*
Years	Team	Apps	(Gls)
2005–present	Salgaocar	63	(0)
- * Club domestic league appearances and goals

Alvito Rodrigues (born 2 July 1982) is an Indian footballer who plays for Salgaocar S.C. as a midfielder in I-League.
