= Daniel Robert (footballer) =

Brazilian footballer (1982-2010)

Personal information
- Full name: Daniel Robert de Jesus
- Date of birth: 14 February 1982
- Place of birth: São Paulo, Brazil
- Date of death: 9 April 2010 (aged 28)
- Place of death: Pavlodar, Kazakhstan
- Height: 1.81 m (5 ft 11 in)
- Position: Forward

Youth career
- Santos

Senior career*
| Years | Team | Apps | (Gls) |
- Guarani
- AD São Caetano
- Fortaleza
- San Vicente
- Bahia
- Horizonte
- Atlético de Alagoinhas
| 2008 | Portuguesa Santista | | |
- U.N.A.M.
| 2010 | Irtysh | 1 | (0) |
- * Club domestic league appearances and goals as of 2 October 2015

Daniel Robert de Jesus (14 February 1982 – 9 April 2010) was a Brazilian professional footballer.

== Career ==
Robert spent the majority of his career playing in his native Brazil, with a short stint with Mexican side U.N.A.M. in 2009.

== Death ==
During the pre-match warm up before FC Irtysh Pavlodar's Kazakhstan Premier League fixture against FC Kairat on 9 April 2010, Robert collapsed, and died after suffering a heart attack.
