= Moreno Esseboom =

Dutch footballer

Personal information
- Full name: Moreno Esseboom
- Date of birth: 2 November 1982 (age 43)
- Place of birth: Amsterdam, Netherlands
- Position: Forward

Senior career*
Years	Team	Apps	(Gls)
2000–2001	Telstar	0	(0)
2001–2002	Volendam	1	(0)
- * Club domestic league appearances and goals

Moreno Esseboom (born 2 November 1982 in Amsterdam) is a Dutch retired footballer who played for Eerste Divisie club FC Volendam during the 2001–02 football season.

== Career ==
Esseboom later played for amateur sides De Wherevogels, Purmersteijn, Oosthuizen and FC Purmerend.
