= Matt Woolley =

English footballer

Personal information
- Full name: Matthew David Woolley
- Date of birth: 22 February 1982 (age 44)
- Place of birth: Manchester, England
- Height: 5 ft 10 in (1.78 m)
- Position: Midfielder

Youth career
- Manchester City
- 199?–1999: Stockport County
- 1999–2000: Macclesfield Town

Senior career*
Years	Team	Apps	(Gls)
2000–2003	Macclesfield Town	5	(0)
- Congleton Town
- * Club domestic league appearances and goals

Matthew David Woolley (born 22 February 1982) is an English former professional footballer who played as a midfielder in the Football League for Macclesfield Town. He was associated with Manchester City as a schoolboy, and began a youth traineeship with Stockport County before joining Macclesfield, and also played non-league football for clubs including Congleton Town.
