= Dmitri Rybakin =

Russian footballer

Personal information
- Full name: Dmitri Vladimirovich Rybakin
- Date of birth: 27 December 1982 (age 43)
- Height: 1.90 m (6 ft 3 in)
- Positions: Defender; midfielder

Youth career
- FC Dynamo Bryansk

Senior career*
Years	Team	Apps	(Gls)
2001–2002	FC Dynamo Bryansk	13	(1)
2004	FC Dynamo-D Bryansk		
2005	FC Lokomotiv Kaluga	7	(0)
2005–2006	FC Dynamo Bryansk	10	(0)
2007	FC Trud Voronezh		
2008	FC Spartak Tambov	33	(0)
2009	FC Dynamo Bryansk	23	(0)
2010	DYuSSh-Dynamo Bryansk		
2014	FC Zenit Zhukovka		
2014–2015	FC Sokol Seltso		
- * Club domestic league appearances and goals

Dmitri Vladimirovich Rybakin (Russian: Дмитрий Владимирович Рыбакин; born 27 December 1982) is a former Russian professional football player.

== Club career ==
He played seasons in the Russian Football National League for FC Dynamo Bryansk in 2006.

== See also ==
- Football in Russia
