= Susanna Hansen =

Faroese footballer

Personal information
- Date of birth: 2 August 1982 (age 44)
- Position: Defender

International career^{‡}
Years	Team	Apps	(Gls)
- Faroe Islands
- ‡ National team caps and goals as of 19:38, 30 August 2019 (UTC)

Susanna Hansen (born 2 August 1982) is a Faroese footballer who plays as a defender and has appeared for the Faroe Islands women's national team.

== Career ==
Hansen has been capped for the Faroe Islands national team, appearing for the team during the 2019 FIFA Women's World Cup qualifying cycle.
