= Mohammed Einas =

Senegalese footballer (born 1982)

Mohammed Enyass
Personal information
- Full name: Mohammed Abdullah Enyass
- Date of birth: 23 March 1982 (age 44)
- Place of birth: Senegal
- Position: Goalkeeper

Senior career*
Years	Team	Apps	(Gls)
2001–2009	Al-Wakra		
2009–2011	Al-Sailiya		
2011–2015	Umm Salal		
2015–2018	Al-Wakra		
- * Club domestic league appearances and goals

Mohammed Enyass (Arabic: محمد إنياس; born 23 March 1982) is a Senegalese former footballer.
