= Andrei Makhayev =

Russian footballer

Personal information
- Full name: Andrei Sergeyevich Makhayev
- Date of birth: 13 September 1982 (age 44)
- Place of birth: Moscow, Russian SFSR
- Height: 1.77 m (5 ft 9 1/2 in)
- Position: Forward

Youth career
- Chertanovo Education Center

Senior career*
Years	Team	Apps	(Gls)
1999	FC Chertanovo Moscow (amateur)		
2000–2001	FC Saturn Ramenskoye	4	(0)
2000	→ FC Saturn-d Ramenskoye (loan)	35	(4)
2002–2003	FC Khimki	28	(1)
2004	FC Volga Tver	20	(1)
2005	FC Boyevoye Bratstvo Moscow Oblast		
- * Club domestic league appearances and goals

Andrei Sergeyevich Makhayev (Russian: Андрей Сергеевич Махаев; born 13 September 1982) is a former Russian football player.
