= Nando (Mozambican footballer) =

Mozambican footballer

Personal information
- Full name: Fernando Paulo Matola
- Date of birth: 9 August 1982
- Date of death: 2 September 2007 (aged 25)
- Place of death: near Modjadjiskloof, South Africa
- Position: Defender

Senior career*
Years	Team	Apps	(Gls)
1998–2002	Costa do Sol	61	(5)
2003–2007	Black Leopards	128	(2)
Total		189	(7)

International career
2002–2007	Mozambique	15	(1)
- * Club domestic league appearances and goals

Fernando Paulo "Nando" Matola (9 August 1982 – 2 September 2007) was a Mozambican footballer who played as a defender. He represented two clubs in a nine-year career and earned 15 caps for his country.

== Career ==
Matola played for Costa do Sol in his homeland and Black Leopards in South Africa, both of which he captained.

== Death ==
Matola was driving from Johannesburg to Maputo for an African Nations Cup qualifier against Tanzania when his car veered off the road and went up in flames. He, his wife and their children were burnt beyond recognition and the bodies were discovered four days later in South Africa's mountainous Limpopo province.
