= James Waltham Curtis =

English painter (c.1839–1901)

James Waltham Curtis (c. 1839 – 18 September 1901), possibly born Charles James Waltham Curtis, was an English-born painter, illustrator, and photographic colourist who became an early practitioner of a distinctively Australian style of art.

== Early life ==
Details of the early life of James Waltham Curtis are sketchy. His death record in Melbourne in 1901, indicating he was born in 1839, states his father’s name as James Curtis and his mother's only as Sarah. Early 21st Century family trees published online by some of his direct descendants name his father as farm labourer James Curtis and his mother as Sarah Elizabeth Crouch. They cite UK census information to show that he was born in Andover, Hampshire, and was the second eldest son among six children. The child in question was named Charles, whose birth is recorded in Andover in February 1839. No other supporting evidence is offered, and there is no reference to the name ‘Waltham’.

The Melbourne journalist James Smith (1820-1910), who had known James Waltham Curtis quite well, gave some details of his early life in a posthumously written booklet. Presumably some details must have been based on what Curtis told him, and at least in part, they contradict the family historians. According to Smith, Curtis came from "an old family in Devonshire" who had been "sea-faring people" until after the end of the Napoleonic wars in 1815. "The artist’s father found himself obliged to take up with mercantile pursuits, which were as uncongenial to him, as they afterwards proved to be to his son, who inherited from his mother a marked fondness for the use of the pencil and the brush," wrote Smith. "This she encouraged, so that it became his solace and delight. He spent much time in such picture galleries as were accessible to him, and also became an omnivorous reader." Some of Curtis’ early art works, Smith recorded, attracted the attention of the wife of an eminent London barrister, who discerned in them "the promise of genius". The unidentified woman commissioned a series of water-colour paintings from Curtis, and was so pleased with them she employed him as a painter. It was after the death of his benefactor a number of years later, Smith wrote, that Curtis decided to migrate to Australia.

Death records in Victoria confirm that Curtis married Maria Farrant, the daughter of a William Farrant, and his wife Emma (nee Lascelles). However, no record has been found of any marriage between a Maria Farrant and a Charles or a James Curtis. The family trees published by descendants seem unanimous in accepting that the marriage took place in December 1866 in St. Mary’s Anglican church in Bryanston Square, London. Some details of the marriage do fit, including the names of the bride and her parents. But if indeed this was the correct marriage, for some reason Curtis in the register gave his name as ‘Charles James Brown’. He stated that his own occupation was a clerk, while his father was a naval officer.

In any event, one ‘James W. Curtis’, described as a merchant, is recorded as arriving in Melbourne aboard the ‘Norfolk’ from Gravesend in July 1868. If this was the artist, it is unclear when Maria arrived, though apparently not on the same ship. Curtis would travel widely through other parts of Australia, but Melbourne would be his home base for the rest of his life.

== Career in Australia ==
=== Photographic colourist ===
Whatever the truth of his early years, it is clear Curtis had already gained considerable experience in artistic work before he arrived in Australia. It was enough to land him a job as a colourist with Melbourne’s leading firm of portrait photographers, Johnstone, O’Shannessy & Co. Around the time he joined the firm, it advertised it had gained "the additional assistance of a highly competent operator of extensive London and Parisian experience", though it’s unknown whether this was a reference to Curtis. He later described this period of his life as his "business probation in Melbourne". Smith recorded that Curtis worked for the studio for eight or nine years and developed a friendship with co-owner Henry James Johnstone (1835-1907), an accomplished landscape artist as well as a portrait photographer. Certainly, Curtis and Johnstone would later often exhibit their work together, and served alongside each other for some years as council members of the Victorian Academy of Arts.

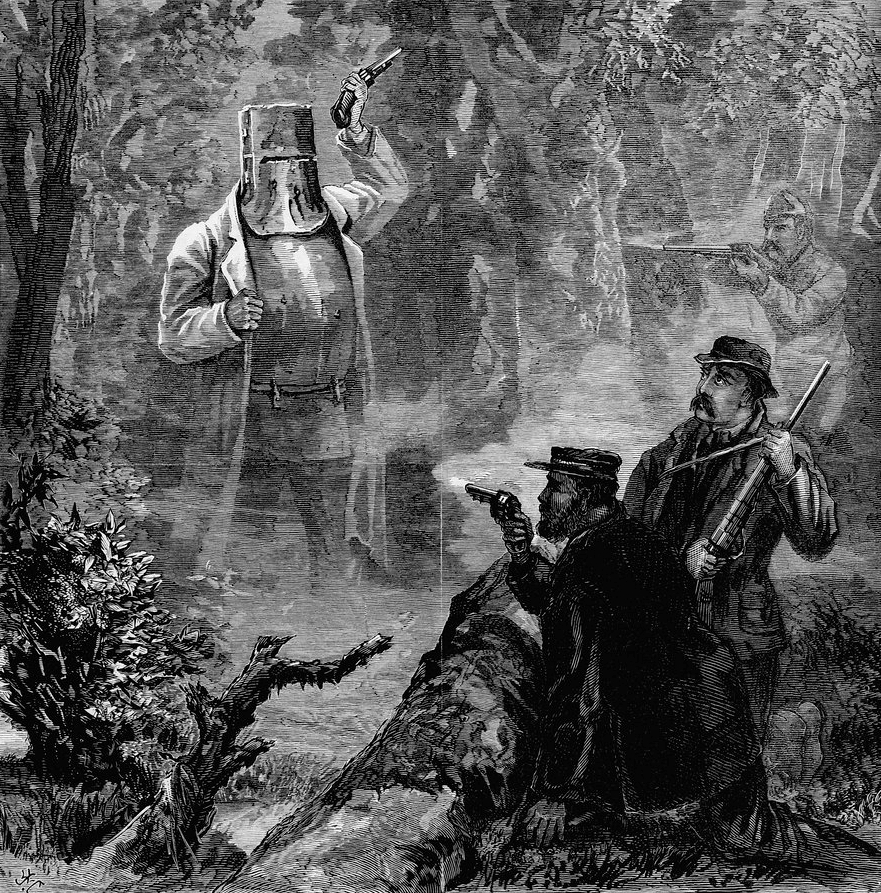
"A strange apparition: Ned Kelly's Fight and Capture", by J. W. Curtis, Illustrated Australian News, 17 July 1880.

=== Illustrator ===
For many years from the early 1870s, Curtis worked as an illustrator. The State Library of Victoria has published an online collection of more than 100 examples of Curtis’ drawings for the Illustrated Australian News, to which he contributed from 1874 until at least 1891. None carry his actual signature, only his monogram engraved in the image. Many of the drawings depict bush scenes, mainly in Victoria. Examples are ‘Clearing Timber, Mount Macedon’ (1880); ‘The Wannon Falls’ (1880), and ‘On the Goulburn, near Shepparton’ (1886). However, news of the day often shaped his choice of subjects. Some events allowed Curtis to use his own eyewitness sketchings. ‘Football match by electric light’, depicting an experimental match at the MCG between Melbourne and Carlton in August, 1879, could be an example. Clearly there were other times when Curtis had to use his imagination after reading newspaper reports, like when he was depicting bushfires or shipwrecks, or when he drew ‘A strange apparition: Ned Kelly’s fight and capture’ (1880) There is no evidence of him travelling outside Australia, so for South Pacific and South American scenes he presumably copied photographs. Curtis also drew illustrations for books published in Australia, as well as for The Age, The Australasian Sketcher with Pen and Pencil, the Illustrated Sydney News, and for several British publications, including the Illustrated London News, the Graphic and the Sketcher.

=== Painter ===
Dating from the period when was working as an illustrator, Curtis produced many paintings in Australia. Working in both oils and watercolours, the majority of his works were landscapes. An article by Curtis in the Illustrated Australian News in January 1881 gives insights into his inspiration. It describes his excitement at having made his first Cobb and Co coach trip out of Melbourne on an unspecified date. Curtis admits he used to be envious watching the arrival and departure of coaches from the Melbourne post office, just around the corner from the photographic studio where he’d first worked. "Many a time have I watched in Melbourne these phases of the locomotive public, and formed many glorious ideas of distant explorations when fate should have relieved me of business shackles," he wrote. To appreciate the natural landscape around Melbourne, Curtis suggested, the observer must be prepared "to admire the gaunt, the grey and the dim – nature in fact in an iron-like frame of mind without the charms of the brightness and glory of colour, but exulting in a fierce and sturdy opposition to climatic conditions; having foliage that can repel the scorching rays of midsummer; roots than can extract nourishment from a soil burnt hard as stone; gnarled trunk and knotted boughs that defy lightning, drought and tempest". The artist expressed particular admiration for gum trees, which featured so often in his work. "Some of these much slandered gum trees, viewed when detached by mist or fog from the confusion of the outline of their fellows, appear as one of nature’s most perfect studies of balance. Bold and erratic as may be the sweep of stem and branch, or irregular the masses of foliage, yet every accidental abrasion of bark by bird or insect, damage by fire or storm, is so unerringly renewed and compensated from Nature’s great storehouse that the result as a whole has an untamed harmony and rugged beauty that dwarfs the pine of Europe to a plaything, and reduces the oak, elm and chestnut to cabbage-headed commonplaces by comparison."

The art historian Tim Bonyhady remarked that the subjects of Curtis’ works were "quite removed" from the "domesticated landscapes" of Swiss-born Abram-Louis Buvelot (1814-1888), regarded around the 1870s as the leading landscape painter in Victoria. Yet Bonyhady observed that "in his depiction of rugged, storm-blown gum-trees", Curtis emulated Buvelot more than any of his contemporaries. It was a similarity of style noted at the time, with one Victorian magazine reviewer commenting that of all artists in the colony, Curtis was the one who came closest to Buvelot "in his delineation of Australian foliage". According to Bonyhady, both Buvelot and Curtis could be seen to be influenced by the 17th Century Dutch master Jacob Isaackszoon van Ruisdael (c. 1629-1682). Curtis’ works could be viewed as keeping within "the great traditions" of European painting, the historian suggested, with aged gum trees "seen as Australian counterparts to the conventional storm-blasted oaks in northern European landscapes".

Paintings by Curtis were on public display at least from the second exhibition in Melbourne of the Victorian Academy of Arts in 1872, to which he contributed eight works, all watercolours, including ‘The Yarra, from Princes Bridge’; ‘Bush Track, near Nunawading’; ‘Swamp near Dromana’; and ‘Dry Creek at Sunbury’. His work was soon winning praise in other Australian colonies as well. An oil painting by Curtis entitled ‘An Autumn Morning’, offered as a Melbourne Art Union prize in 1874, was "a perfect representation of the wild romantic Australian scenery which is the characteristic of the mountain ranges", reported the South Australian Register. In 1878, a Curtis painting, ‘Woodcutters’ Track through the Ranges’, was included in the South Australian display at the International Exhibition in Paris. Curtis was a regular contributor to the black and white exhibitions of the Victorian Academy of Arts, from its first in 1882. In 1886, he took part in the inaugural exhibition of the Australian Artists’ Association, soon to amalgamate with the Academy to form the Victorian Artists’ Society. That same year, the Illustrated Australian News published a coloured illustration, taken from a Curtis painting called ‘The Kingfisher’. Curtis’ sketches of Australian scenery, the paper told its readers, "place him in the front rank of colonial artists". A decade later, Curtis was a founding member of the Melbourne Art Club. A report on its inaugural landscapes exhibition in The Herald highlighted Curtis as one of the artists who were managing to catch "the true spirit and poetry of Australian landscape". Three pictures in the exhibition by him "could not be other than Australian", it remarked.

Like any artist, Curtis was not without his critics. Perhaps most unfortunate for his early career as a painter were the official catalogue mentions he received when one of his works was displayed at the 1875 Intercolonial Exhibition in Melbourne, and then at the 1876 Centennial International Exhibition in Philadelphia. The identically-worded catalogue entries drew parallels between aspects of Curtis’ style and that of the leading French Romanticist painter, Théodore Géricault (1791-1824). Curtis’ paintings had considerable merit, although they were "generally too sombre to find many admirers", the catalogues said. "He is the Australian Jericault (sic), and although his pictures do not present the horrors of ‘Death on the Raft’ (sic), they are tinged with a melancholy and uniform tint of coldness and desolation that are sometimes worked up with really artistic effect." Newspaper reviewers could also be critical of Curtis’ work. “He has many of the qualifications for success; and not least of these is a lively imagination, combined with a quick eye for the picture aspects of nature, and a nice sense of colour," observed one Argus writer in 1875. “But the artist’s ambition is greater than his executive power; and he falls into the too common mistake of supposing that ad captandum passages of colour will suffice for these deficiencies.”

Around 1890, Curtis was commissioned by Joseph Cowen Syme (1852-1916), part-owner of The Age, to paint a series of oil and monochrome paintings to decorate his new St Kilda Rd residence. Far more important to Curtis’ survival as a professional artist, however, was the interest in his work shown by the eccentric American businessman, Thomas Welton Stanford (1832-1918), who had arrived in Australia in 1860 to become a successful merchant dealing in miners’ supplies and sewing machines. Stanford, who had settled for life in Melbourne, had developed two strong passions following the death of his new wife, Minnie, and only child in 1870 – spiritualism, and Australian landscape art. Stanford had works by many of the leading Australian landscape painters of the last half of the 1800s in his private collection at his East Melbourne home, which he opened for public viewing for two hours every Sunday for 13 years until 1904. But clearly Curtis was his favourite, and he ended up owning 119 oils and watercolours by the artist, many of them commissioned by himself. Stanford and Curtis travelled together on horseback through Victoria, neighbouring colonies, and Queensland, as the artist drew sketches and painted. In 1897, after several years’ work, Curtis completed 60 watercolours commissioned by Stanford. Without being exhibited in Australia, these were immediately donated by the owner to Stanford University in California, founded a few years earlier by his brother, Leland, and his wife, Jane. The journalist James Smith recorded that later payments from Stanford, freeing Curtis from having to paint for a livelihood, enabled him to spend “five happy and fruitful years”, up to the time of his death in 1901. In this final stage of his career, Smith wrote, “his interpretations of Australian landscape scenery gained steadily in power, fidelity, sweetness and poetry”.

After Curtis’ death in 1901, The Argus newspaper said of Curtis: “It may be said with truth that no painter, with the exception, perhaps, of Buvelot, has brought to the rendering of Australian landscape such a comprehensive sympathy, poetic feeling, and high technical ability as Curtis, while in the precise and delicate expression of Australian colouring even the Swiss painter cannot be allowed to go unchallenged ... Curtis’s pictures breathe the very atmosphere of the bush. They are thoroughly characteristic of Australian scenery, from the foreground, which is always strongly and sharply brought out, through all the gradations of distance until the vapour on some-off hill melts into the sky.”

== Personal life ==
Victorian birth records show that Curtis and his wife Maria had at least six children between 1869 and 1878 – four daughters and two sons, all born in Melbourne. He died, intestate, at the age of 62 in Melbourne in September 1901. The cause of death was reportedly stomach cancer. A death notice in The Australasian stated that the couple had been living in New Street, Brighton, when Maria lost her “dearly beloved” husband. He was buried at the Brighton Cemetery.

== Legacy of work ==
It’s not known how many of the 60 Curtis works donated by T. W. Stanford in 1897 were publicly displayed at Stanford University, though a report announcing their arrival said there were plans to show them in the museum. All the works survived the Great Earthquake of 1906, in which the museum was severely damaged. The university received another 56 of Curtis’ landscape paintings in oil and watercolours as a bequest from T. W. Stanford following his death in Australia in 1918. Before being made part of the museum collection, these works were shown in their entirety in 1921, and possibly a few subsequent years, in a new art gallery building at the university built with funds from T. W. Stanford’s estate. By 1986, however, a Curtis work called ‘Horseman Fording a Stream’ was the only one of almost 150 Australian landscapes formerly held by Stanford University’s museum (including by other leading artists) still in its possession. "The others were either lost, sold, or given away, primarily during the period from 1917 to 1952, when the building lay in ruins and local collectors and dealers could wander through it at will," said a 1986 book published by the university. By 2018, even this final Curtis work had apparently been sold, none being listed in Stanford’s Cantor Arts Center online database.

In Australia, Curtis’ works are in the collections of numerous public galleries and libraries, including the National Gallery of Australia; the National Gallery of Victoria; the State Library of Victoria; the State Library of NSW; and the Art Gallery of NSW. In May 2018, three oils by Curtis were auctioned by Sotheby’s in Australia, including one originally in the Stanford collection, titled ‘Above Nellies Glen, Katoomba, NSW’. It sold for $A31,720. Another work, ‘Cathedral Stillness’, sold for $A67,100 – at the time, a record price for the artist.

== Gallery ==
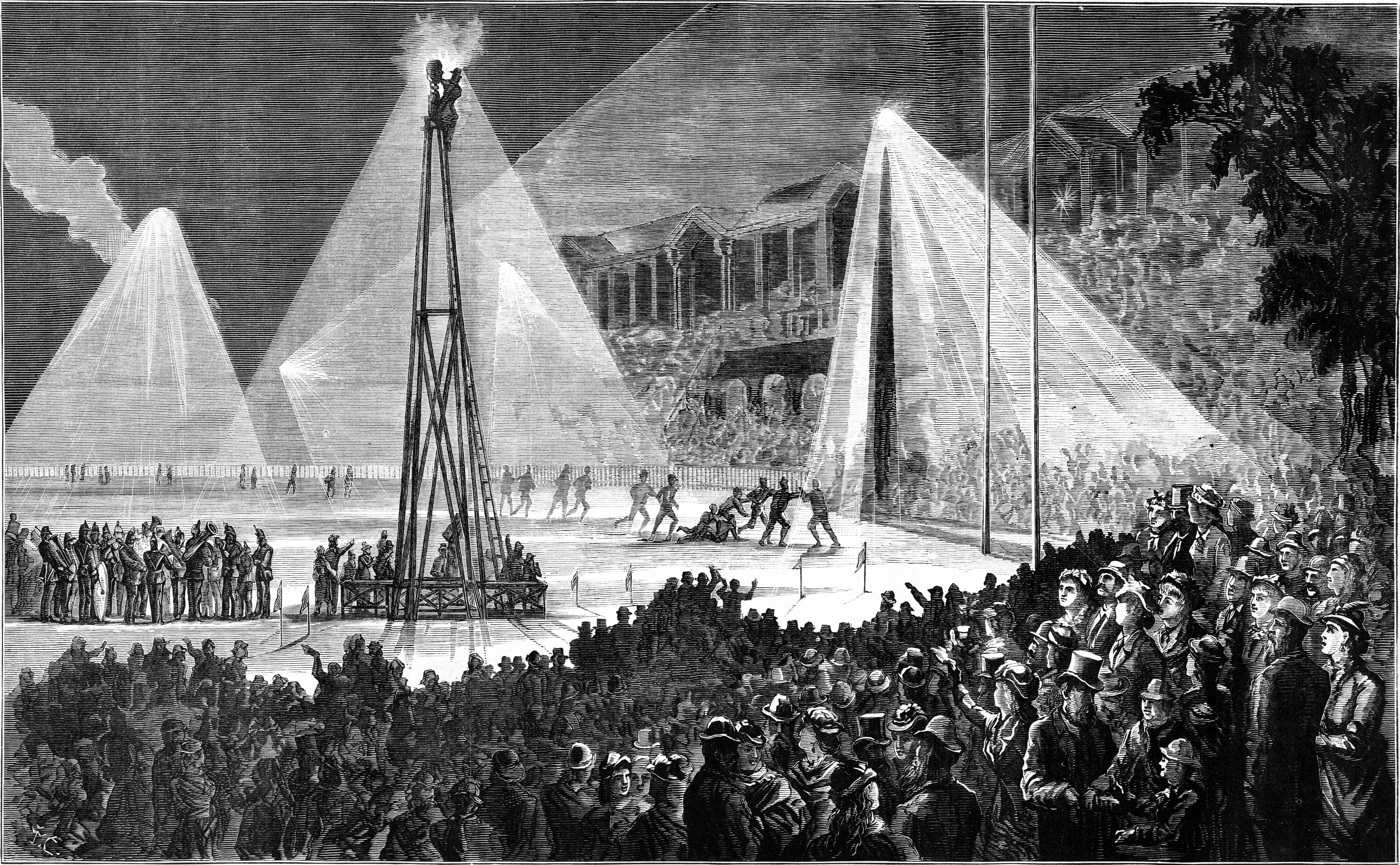
Football under electric lights at the MCG (1879); drawing by J. W. Curtis (Courtesy: State Library of Victoria)

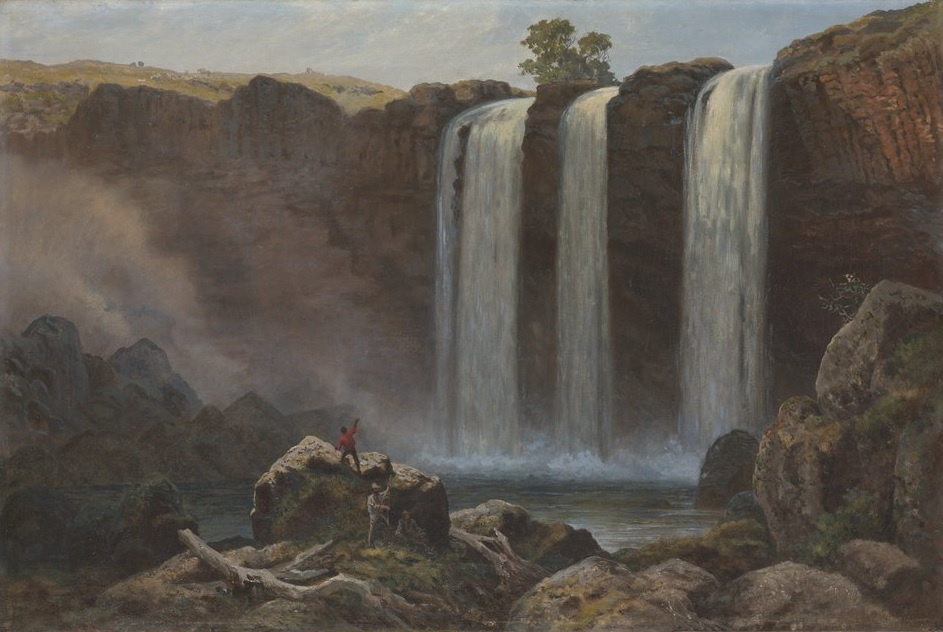
Falls of Wannon (circa 1870); oil painting by J. W. Curtis, (Courtesy: State Library of Victoria)

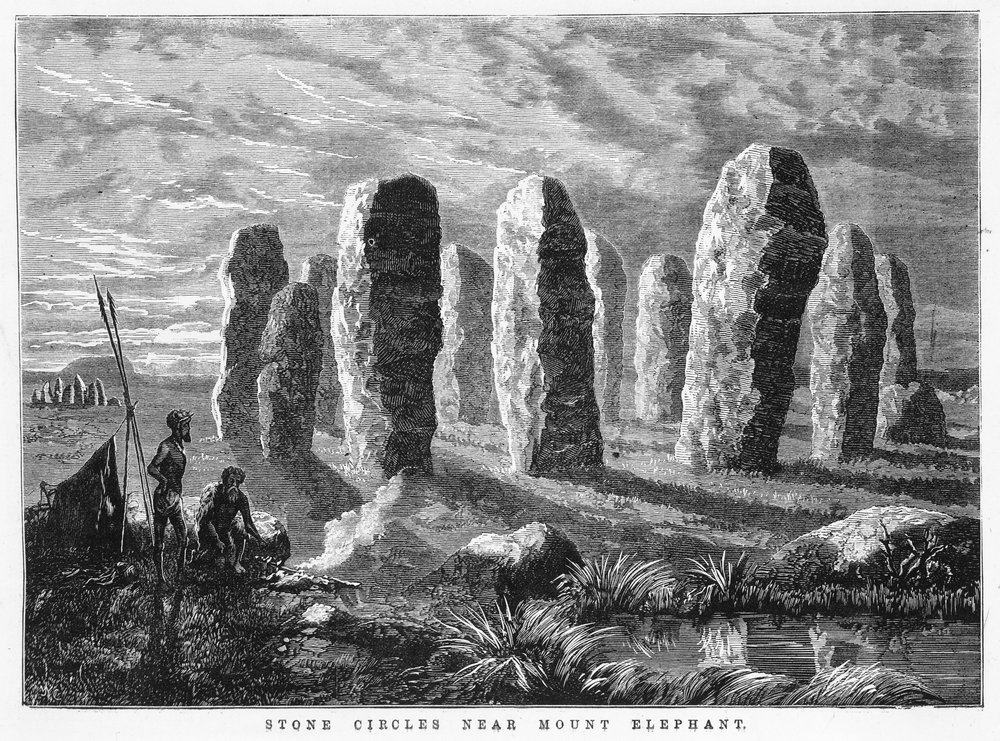
Stone circles near Mount Elephant (1877), illustration by J. W. Curtis (Courtesy: State Library of Victoria)

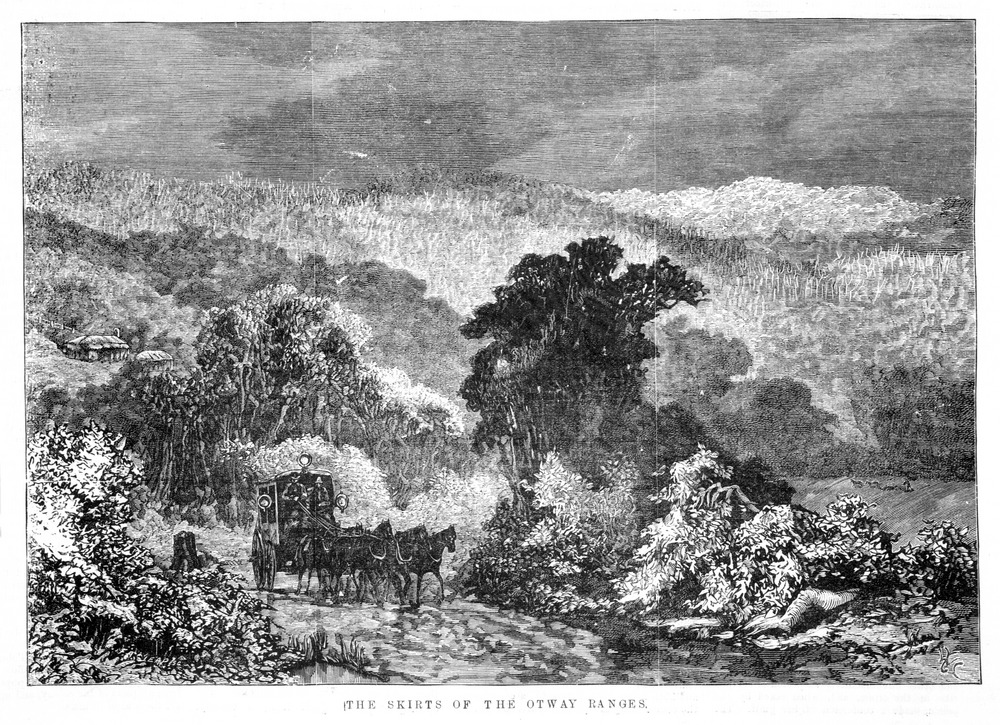
Skirts of the Otway Ranges (1886), illustration by J. W. Curtis (Courtesy: State Library of Victoria)

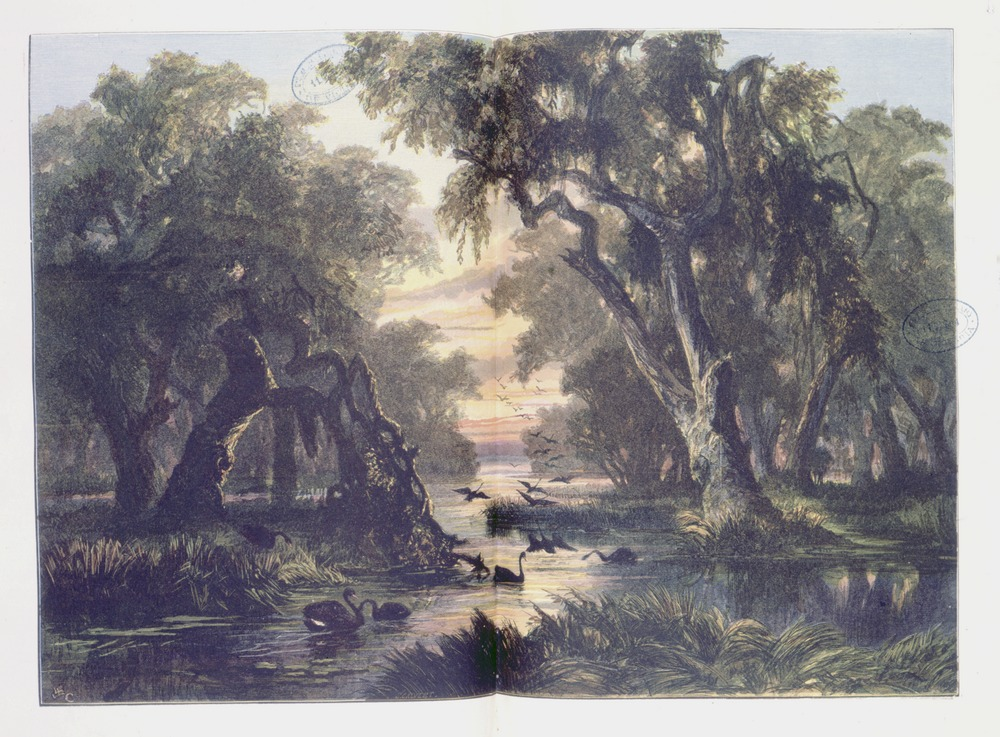
An Australian lake scene, at sunset (1881), drawing by J. W. Curtis (Courtesy: State Library of Victoria)

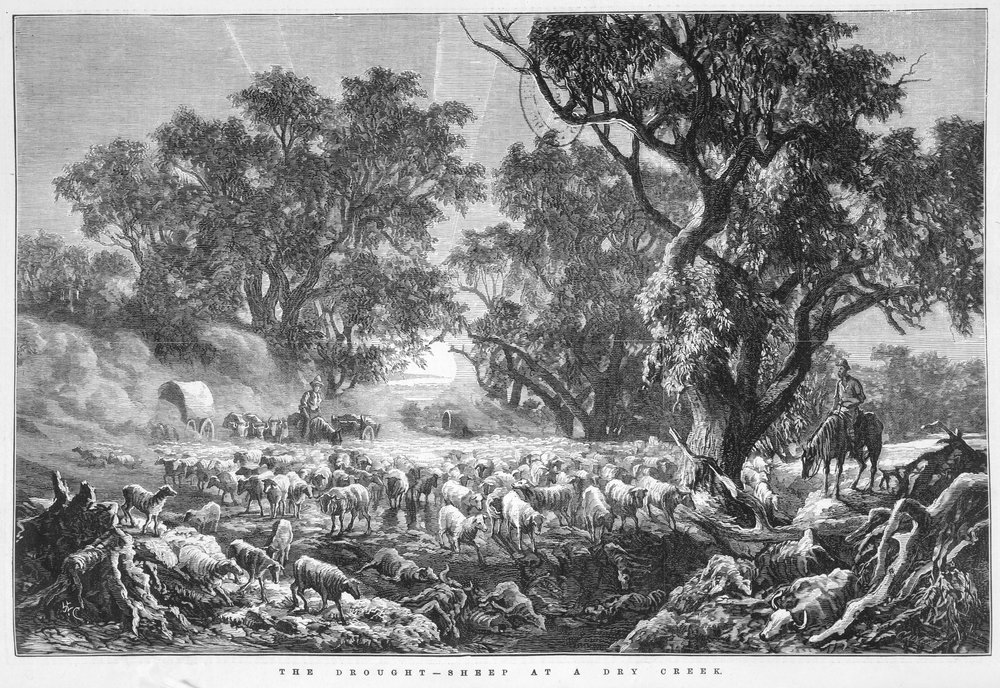
The drought, sheep at a dry creek (1878), illustration by J. W. Curtis (Courtesy: State Library of Victoria)
