= Nabil Dafi =

French footballer (born 1982)

Personal information
- Date of birth: 26 January 1982 (age 44)
- Place of birth: Strasbourg, France
- Height: 1.80 m (5 ft 11 in)
- Position: Defensive midfielder

Senior career*
Years	Team	Apps	(Gls)
–2007	FSV Oggersheim		
2007–2008	Borussia Neunkirchen	21	(2)
2008–2011	1. FC Saarbrücken	55	(0)
2012–2017	Borussia Neunkirchen	18	(1)
- * Club domestic league appearances and goals as of 8 November 2012

Nabil Dafi (born 26 January 1982) is a French footballer who last played for Borussia Neunkirchen. Dafi, who plays as a defensive midfielder, has spent much of career in Germany. After spells with FSV Oggersheim and Borussia Neunkirchen, he joined 1. FC Saarbrücken in 2008, and helped the club achieve consecutive promotions, from the Oberliga Südwest to the Regionalliga West and onward to the 3. Liga. He made his first appearance at this level in the penultimate game of the 2010–11 season, replacing Nico Zimmermann in a win against SV Babelsberg 03. He was released at the end of the season and returned to Borussia Neunkirchen.
