= Biko Brazil =

Dutch professional footballer

Personal information
- Full name: Brazil Nombeko
- Date of birth: 4 July 1984 (age 42)
- Place of birth: Utrecht, Netherlands
- Position: Striker

Youth career
- PSV
- FC Utrecht
- USV Elinkwijk
- FC Den Bosch

Senior career*
Years	Team	Apps	(Gls)
2002–2003	FC Den Bosch	17	(0)
2003–2005	RKC	0	(0)
2005–2006	Omniworld	25	(2)
2006–2007	APEP Pitsilia	18	(9)
2007–2008	Dessel Sport	19	(2)
2008–2009	WHC		
2009–2010	Be Quick '28		
2010–2011	Sparta Nijkerk		
2011–2014	Hercules		
2014–2016	Echteld		
2016–2017	Benschop		
- * Club domestic league appearances and goals as of 19:30, 12 November 2016 (UTC)

Brazil Nombeko (born 4 July 1982), also known as Biko Brazil, is a Dutch retired footballer who played as a striker.

== Club career ==
Born in Utrecht of Surinamese descent, Brazil played youth football with PSV, FC Utrecht, USV Elinkwijk and FC Den Bosch.

After playing Dutch league football for FC Den Bosch, RKC Waalwijk and FC Omniworld, Brazil later played in Cyprus for APEP Pitsilia and in Belgium for Dessel Sport.

Brazil later returned to Dutch amateur football, playing with WHC Wezep, Be Quick '28, Sparta Nijkerk, Hercules, Echteld and Benschop.
