= Adrian Woźniczka =

Polish footballer (born 1982)

Personal information
- Full name: Adrian Woźniczka
- Date of birth: 14 August 1982 (age 44)
- Place of birth: Tarnów, Poland
- Height: 1.83 m (6 ft 0 in)
- Position: Defender

Youth career
- Unia Tarnów
- MSP Szamotuły

Senior career*
Years	Team	Apps	(Gls)
2001	Tasmania 73 Neukölln		
2001	GKS Bełchatów		
2002	LKS Gomunice		
2002–2003	Stomil Olsztyn	17	(0)
2003–2004	Aluminium Konin	18	(0)
2004–2005	MKS Mława	31	(1)
2005–2006	Zawisza Bydgoszcz (2)	23	(0)
2006	Polonia Warsaw	7	(0)
2007	KSZO Ostrowiec	15	(0)
2007–2011	ŁKS Łódź	74	(1)
2011–2015	Miedź Legnica	117	(3)
2015–2017	Miedź Legnica II	65	(9)
2017–2023	Apis Jędrzychowice	160	(8)
- * Club domestic league appearances and goals

Adrian Woźniczka (born 14 August 1982) is a Polish former professional footballer who played as a defender.

== Career ==
=== Club ===
In June 2005, he joined Kujawiak Włocławek (from spring 2006 Zawisza Bydgoszcz (2)) on a one-year deal.

In Summer 2006, he moved to Polonia Warsaw.

In March 2007, he signed a contract with KSZO Ostrowiec.

In July 2007, he moved to ŁKS Łódź.

In June 2011, he joined Miedź Legnica.

== Honours ==
ŁKS Łódź

- I liga: 2010–11

Miedź Legnica

- II liga West: 2011–12

Apis Jędrzychowice

- IV liga Lower Silesia West: 2017–18, 2019–20
