= Charles Kokougan =

French-born Togolese footballer (born 1982)

Charles Kokougan (born 16 July 1982 in Paris, France) is a former professional footballer who played as a defender.

== International career ==
Born in France, he played for the Togo national team internationally. His single cap came in a 2006 friendly match against Guinea, in which Togo lost 1-0.
