= Gerald Gansterer =

Austrian footballer

Personal information
- Date of birth: 29 October 1982 (age 44)
- Place of birth: Wiener Neustadt, Austria
- Height: 1.76 m (5 ft 9 in)
- Position: Defender

Team information
- Current team: FC Pasching
- Number: 4

Youth career
- 1989–1997: ASK Ternitz
- 1997–2001: Rapid Wien

Senior career*
Years	Team	Apps	(Gls)
2001–2006	FK Austria Wien Amateurs	52	(1)
2006–2009	LASK Linz	89	(4)
2009–2010	Kapfenberg	22	(1)
2011–	FC Pasching		
- * Club domestic league appearances and goals

Gerald Gansterer (born 29 October 1982) is an Austrian footballer who currently plays for Austrian team FC Pasching.
