= Wencho Farrell =

Dutch footballer

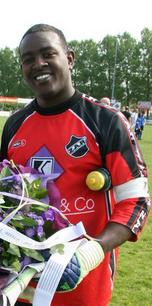
- Farrell in 2011

Personal information
- Date of birth: 25 December 1982 (age 43)
- Position: Goalkeeper

Team information
- Current team: HCSC

Senior career*
Years	Team	Apps	(Gls)
2002–2008	HCSC	?	(?)
2008–2009	Türkiyemspor	?	(?)
2009–	HCSC	?	(?)

International career
2008	Netherlands Antilles	5	(0)
2011–	Curaçao	2	(0)
- * Club domestic league appearances and goals

Wencho Farrell (born 25 December 1982) is an international footballer from the Netherlands Antilles who plays amateur club football with HCSC.

== Club career ==
Farrell began his career in 2002 with HCSC, and has also had a season-long spell with Türkiyemspor.
