= Igor Pešić =

Serbian footballer

Personal information
- Date of birth: 6 October 1982 (age 44)
- Place of birth: Leskovac, SFR Yugoslavia
- Height: 1.77 m (5 ft 10 in)
- Position: Defender

Senior career*
Years	Team	Apps	(Gls)
2001–2004	Zemun	28	(1)
2004	Borac Čačak	4	(0)
2005–2006	ÍA	23	(2)
2007	Fram	9	(0)
2009–2010	ÍA	10	(0)
2010–2011	Sinđelić Niš	1	(0)
2011	→ Moravac Mrštane (loan)		
2011–2012	Žitorađa	13	(0)
2012	→ Radnik Surdulica (loan)	11	(1)
2012	Radnik Surdulica	13	(1)
2013	Vlasina		
2013	Radnički Svilajnac	10	(1)
2014	Dubočica	12	(1)
- * Club domestic league appearances and goals as of 25 October 2014

Igor Pešić (Serbian Cyrillic: Игор Пешић; born 6 October 1982) is a Serbian retired football defender.
