= David Kenga =

Kenyan footballer (born 1982)

Personal information
- Full name: David Kenga
- Date of birth: July 8, 1982 (age 44)
- Place of birth: Kilifi, Kenya
- Height: 5 ft 9 in (1.75 m)
- Position: Midfielder

Team information
- Current team: SC United Bantams

Youth career
- 2001–2002: Moi University Eldoret
- 2003–2006: Winthrop Eagles

Senior career*
Years	Team	Apps	(Gls)
2006	Indiana Invaders	11	(0)
2008	Charleston Battery	17	(1)
2009	Indiana Invaders	6	(0)
2013–	SC United Bantams	0	(0)

International career^{‡}
2011	Kenya	1	(0)

Managerial career
- 2003–2005: UMass Lowell (assistant)
- 2010–: Fuhaha Academy
- * Club domestic league appearances and goals as of March 21, 2011 ‡ National team caps and goals as of March 21, 2011

David Kenga (born July 8, 1982) is a Kenyan footballer who played for SC United Bantams in the USL Premier Development League.

== Career ==
=== College and amateur ===
Kenga was born in Kilifi. He moved from his native Kenya to the United States in 2003 to attend and play college soccer at Winthrop University in Rock Hill, South Carolina. In the summer of 2006, he also played for the Indiana Invaders of the fourth division Premier Development League.

=== Professional ===
On April 10, 2008, the Charleston Battery of the USL First Division signed Kenga. He made his professional debut on April 12, 2008, as a substitute in Charleston's opening day fixture against Miami FC, and went on to make 17 appearances and score one goal before being released at the end of the year.

Having been unable to sign on with a professional club elsewhere, he returned to the amateur Indiana Invaders in 2009, playing 6 games for the South Bend side in the USL Premier Development League.

== Coaching ==
In addition to his playing career, Kenga worked as an assistant coach at UMass Lowell between 2003 and 2005.

== Personal life ==
With his cousin Robert Mambo, he founded with his cousin the Fuhaha Academy, a youth soccer academy for boys and girls. The academy is based in the Kenyan coastal town of Kilifi. Kenga is a cousin of the famous Kenian midfielder Robert Mambo Mumba.
