= Brendan McElholm =

Northern Irish footballer

Personal information
- Full name: Brendan Anthony McElholm
- Date of birth: 7 July 1982 (age 44)
- Place of birth: Omagh, Northern Ireland
- Height: 1.80 m (5 ft 11 in)
- Position: Central defender

Youth career
- Leyton Orient

Senior career*
| Years | Team | Apps | (Gls) |
| 2000–2002 | Leyton Orient | 17 | (0) |
| 2001 | → Chelmsford City (loan) | 3 | (0) |
| 2002–2005 | Omagh Town | | |
- Strathroy Harps
- Tummery Athletic

International career
| 1998 | Northern Ireland U16 | 3 | (0) |
| 2000 | Northern Ireland U18 | 5 | (0) |

Managerial career
- Tummery Athletic
- * Club domestic league appearances and goals

Brendan Anthony McElholm (born 7 July 1982) is a Northern Irish footballer who plays as a central defender.

== Club career ==
Born in Omagh, Northern Ireland, McElholm began his senior career at Leyton Orient, after playing in the club's academy. In August 2001, McElholm joined Chelmsford City on loan for a month. On 18 January 2002, McElholm was released from his contract at Leyton Orient, after making 17 Football League appearances. Following his release from Leyton Orient, McElholm signed for Omagh Town. McElholm has also played for local Omagh clubs Strathroy Harps and Tummery Athletic.

== International career ==
McElholm has represented Northern Ireland at under-16 and under-18 levels.
