= Hubert Charpentier =

French professional football player (born 1982)

Personal information
- Date of birth: October 14, 1982 (age 44)
- Place of birth: Laon, France
- Height: 1.76 m (5 ft 9 1/2 in)
- Position: Goalkeeper

Team information
- Current team: Jura Sud

Senior career*
Years	Team	Apps	(Gls)
2001–2004	Stade Reims	9	(0)
2004–2005	Calais RUFC		
2005–2006	did not play		
2006–2007	Olympique Saint-Quentin		
2007–2008	SC Feignies		
2008	FU Narbonne		
2009–	Jura Sud		
- * Club domestic league appearances and goals as of 15:20, 25 November 2009 (UTC)

Hubert Charpentier (born October 14, 1982) is a French professional football player. Currently, he plays in the Championnat de France amateur for Jura Sud Lavans.

He played on the professional level in Ligue 2 for Stade Reims.
