= Lee Ayres =

English footballer

Personal information
- Full name: Lee Terence Ayres
- Date of birth: 28 August 1982 (age 44)
- Place of birth: Birmingham, England
- Height: 6 ft 1 in (1.85 m)
- Position: Defender

Senior career*
Years	Team	Apps	(Gls)
2000–2001	Walsall	0	(0)
2001–2003	Kidderminster Harriers	35	(2)
2003	→ Tamworth (loan)	7	(0)
2003–2004	Tamworth	16	(0)
2004–2006	Burton Albion	26	(0)
2006–2007	Moor Green	27	(2)
2007–2008	Solihull Moors	0	(0)
2008	Redditch United	0	(0)
2008–2010	Forest Green Rovers	28	(2)
2010	Halesowen Town	10	(0)
2010–2011	Redditch United	15	(0)
2011	Solihull Moors	8	(0)
2011–2013	Worcester City	45	(1)
Total		217	(7)
- * Club domestic league appearances and goals

Lee Terence Ayres (born 28 August 1982) is a professional English footballer who last played for Worcester City. He previously spent time at Kidderminster Harriers, Burton Albion and Forest Green Rovers.

== Playing career ==
Ayres started his career with Walsall in their youth academy; although not making the first team, he impressed enough to earn a move to Kidderminster Harriers in the Football League Third Division.

Upon joining Harriers, Ayres became a permanent fixture in the first team setup. During two seasons Ayres made a total of 35 appearances and scored two goals. Towards the end of his second season, Ayres lost his place in the first team and subsequently joined Tamworth in the Football Conference, initially on loan.

After a successful spell, Tamworth made an approach to sign Ayres, but Ayres himself rejected the move as he wanted to stay and force a way back into the first team.

On 23 November 2003, Jan Molby released Ayres, as he believed the club had enough centre-backs.

Ayres, now a free agent, rejoined Tamworth on a permanent basis. Ayres was only with The Lambs for a brief time making just 16 appearances; these impressive performances earned Ayres a trial with Notts County, but Ayres was unsuccessful and returned to Tamworth.

Ayres then went on to join local rivals Burton Albion.

After an impressive first season with The Brewers, when he made 26 appearances, a persistent pelvic injury prevented Ayres making a single appearance in his second season at the club. Ayres was eventually released at the end of the 2005–06 season.

In search of a new club, Ayres received a trial from Bristol Rovers manager Paul Trollope. He played against Swansea City in a reserve game. Unfortunately for Ayres, the trial was unsuccessful and the defender eventually joined Conference North side Moor Green. Following the merger of Moor Green with Solihull Borough in the summer of 2007, Ayres began the 2007–08 campaign with Solihull Moors.

Ayres then moved on to Redditch United; however he left the club in December 2008, to sign for Forest Green Rovers. Ayres impressed in his spell with Forest Green and was offered a new one-year contract in June 2009, following his impressive performances in Rovers relegation battle. Ayres suffered an injury in the opening game of the 2009–10 season and missed the majority of the season; however he made a return on 5 April as a late substitute in the 3–4 loss to his former club Tamworth.

Ayres spent the summer of 2010 in pre season with Forest Green but both parties failed to agree a new contract and Ayres left the club.

Ayres signed for Halesowen Town shortly after. Before moving back to Redditch United on Saturday 2 October. Ayres joined Solihull Moors on 1 March 2011.

In July 2011 Ayres linked up with Worcester City.
