= Tshitenge Mukandila =

Congolese footballer

Personal information
- Date of birth: 24 March 1982
- Date of death: 25 September 2010 (aged 28)
- Position: Midfielder

Senior career*
Years	Team	Apps	(Gls)
–1999	JS Diulu		
2000–2004	AS Saint-Luc		
2005–2006	TP Mazembe		
2005	→ SC Cilu		
2006–2008	APR FC		
2009	TP Mazembe		
2010	DC Motema Pembe		

International career
2005	DR Congo	3	(0)
- * Club domestic league appearances and goals

Tshitenge Mukandila (24 March 1982 – 25 September 2010) was a Congolese football midfielder.
