= Stijn Francis =

Belgian football agent and former player

Personal information
- Date of birth: 18 December 1982 (age 43)
- Height: 1.86 m (6 ft 1 in)
- Position: Midfielder

Youth career
- Lierse
- KTH Diest
- Westerlo

Senior career*
| Years | Team | Apps | (Gls) |
| 2001–2002 | Westerlo | 1 | (0) |
| 2002–2004 | Geel | | |
| 2005–2008 | OH Leuven | 56 | (6) |
| 2008–2012 | Overijse | | |
| 2012–2013 | Lubbeek | | |
- * Club domestic league appearances and goals

Stijn Francis (born 18 December 1982) is a Belgian former football player who played for Westerlo, Oud-Heverlee Leuven and Verbroedering Geel. He is now active as a football agent.

== Players' career ==
Francis started his career with Westerlo at the highest level of Belgian football but played only one match in the Belgian 1st division with the first team when he was a late substitute in a 1–4 win away to Beveren on the penultimate matchday of the 2000–01 Belgian First Division. He also played European football with Westerlo in the so-called Intertoto Cup. At the end of that season, he moved to Belgian Second Division team Verbroedering Geel, where he stayed two seasons. In the winter of the 2004–2005 season, he signed for Oud-Heverlee Leuven and played three more season in the Second Division. Thereafter he moved to lower divisions, playing for Tempo Overijse from 2008 to 2012, before he moved to SMS Lubbeek as he could no longer combine football with his main profession as a lawyer.

== Professional career ==
After a career as a business lawyer at the law firms of Clifford Chance and Nelissen Grade, Francis founded Stirr Associates in 2014. Stirr Associates is a football agency and has been involved in transfers of players such as Dries Mertens, Toby Alderweireld and Zinho Vanheusden. Francis is considered to be one of the leading football agents in Belgium. Francis is also active as arbitrator in the Belgian Court of Arbitration of Sports and lectures at the International Football Business Institute.

Francis is also the author of the Bankrupt Footballer, a book on the business side of a footballer's career.
