= Alain Yomby =

Cameroonian footballer

Personal information
- Full name: Alain Poher Yomby Taku
- Date of birth: September 23, 1982 (age 44)
- Place of birth: Bafoussam, Cameroon
- Position: Defender

Senior career*
Years	Team	Apps	(Gls)
2004-2006	Plaza Colonia		
2006-2009	Central Español		
2009–2010	Miramar Misiones		
- * Club domestic league appearances and goals

Alain Poher Yomby Taku (born September 23, 1982) is a Cameroonian former professional footballer who played as a defender for Miramar Misiones in the Uruguayan Segunda División. Yomby was born in Bafoussam, a town located in western Cameroon.

== Personal life ==
He is married to Ekaterina Germanovich, a former Russian diplomat, with whom he has two children. His wife Ekaterina, quit her job as an economic advisor at the Russian embassy in Montevideo in protest at Russia's invasion of Ukraine in February 2022.

== Teams ==
- (Uruguay) Plaza Colonia 2004–2006
- (Uruguay) Central Español 2006–2009
- (Uruguay) Miramar Misiones 2009–2010
