= Juan Pablo (footballer, born 1982) =

Spanish footballer

Personal information
- Full name: Juan Pablo Ruiz Pérez
- Date of birth: 5 November 1982 (age 44)
- Place of birth: La Puebla del Río, Spain
- Height: 1.90 m (6 ft 3 in)
- Position: Centre-forward

Youth career
- Betis

Senior career*
Years	Team	Apps	(Gls)
2001	Betis B	1	(0)
2001	Portuense	4	(1)
2002	Hellín		
2002–2003	Dos Hermanas	17	(5)
2003–2004	Écija	5	(0)
2004	Lucentino	12	(4)
2004–2005	Sporting Mahonés	38	(23)
2005–2006	Algeciras	36	(14)
2006–2008	Sevilla B	63	(12)
2008–2009	Cartagena	31	(9)
2010	Valencia B	13	(2)
2010–2012	Écija	66	(16)
Total		286	(86)
- * Club domestic league appearances and goals

Juan Pablo Ruiz Pérez (born 5 November 1982), known as Juan Pablo, is a Spanish former professional footballer who played as a centre-forward.

== Career ==
Juan Pablo was born in La Puebla del Río, Province of Seville. During his early career, spent mainly in the lower leagues, he – an unsuccessful Real Betis youth graduate – represented Betis B, Racing Club Portuense, Hellín Deportivo, Dos Hermanas CF, Écija Balompié, Atlético Lucentino, CF Sporting Mahonés, Algeciras CF and Sevilla Atlético. With the latter, he made his Segunda División debut in the 2007–08 season, scoring four goals in 30 games as the Andalusians retained their status in their debut campaign in the competition.

In the summer of 2008, Juan Pablo joined FC Cartagena of Segunda División B. On 24 May 2009, he netted the deciding goal at CD Alcoyano (2–2, 4–3 aggregate win) as the Murcian side, under their new denomination, promoted to the second division for the first time ever.

After initially refusing to renew his link and wanting a buyout, which eventually led to his demotion to reserves Cartagena La Unión (only for training), Juan Pablo finally accepted, and was reinstated by Cartagena in January 2010. On the 29th, however, he was released, joining Valencia CF's reserves shortly after.

In August 2010, after his last team's relegation, Juan Pablo continued his career in the third tier, returning to former club Écija. He retired at the age of only 30 after becoming despondent with the sport, later working as manager and personal driver of bullfighter Morante de la Puebla.
