= Martin Eisl =

Austrian professional footballer

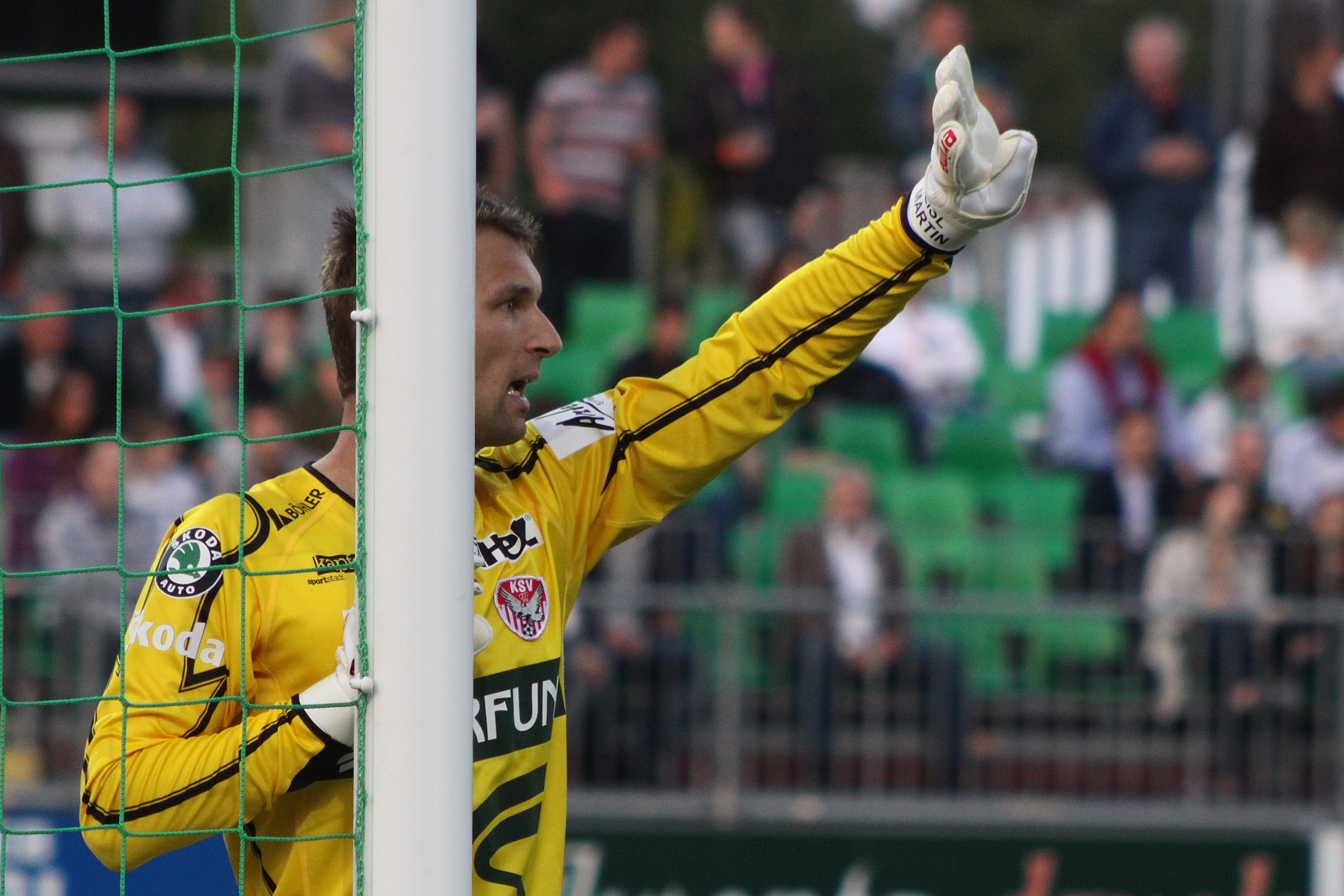

Personal information
- Full name: Martin Eisl
- Date of birth: 14 November 1982 (age 44)
- Place of birth: Salzburg, Austria
- Height: 1.87 m (6 ft 1 1/2 in)
- Position: Goalkeeper

Team information
- Current team: SVA Kindberg

Senior career*
Years	Team	Apps	(Gls)
2002–2007	Red Bull Salzburg		
2007–2010	Kapfenberger SV	48	(0)
2010–2011	SV Grödig	23	(0)
2011–2012	SV Austria Salzburg	15	(0)
2012	FC Liefering	0	(0)
2013	SV Wildon		
2013–	SVA Kindberg		
- * Club domestic league appearances and goals as of 12:21, 22 December 2013 (UTC)

Martin Eisl (born 14 November 1982) is an Austrian professional footballer currently playing for Austrian side SVA Kindberg. He plays as a goalkeeper.
