= Luis Abel Peña =

Paraguayan footballer (born 1982)

Personal information
- Full name: Luis Abel Peña
- Date of birth: 7 January 1982 (age 44)
- Place of birth: Asunción, Paraguay
- Height: 1.70 m (5 ft 7 in)
- Position: Midfielder

Youth career
- Almagro

Senior career*
Years	Team	Apps	(Gls)
2000–2002	Almagro	5	(0)
2002–2003	Deportivo Colonia		
2003–2004	San Martín SJ	34	(2)
2005	Correcaminos UAT	11	(1)
2005–2007	Almirante Brown	72	(6)
2007–2008	Unión San Felipe	39	(9)
2008	Deportes La Serena	15	(3)
2009	Deportivo Laferrere	22	(4)
2010	San Miguel	4	(0)
2011–2018	Tristán Suárez	81	(9)
2013–2014	→ San Telmo (loan)	25	(2)
2014	→ General Lamadrid (loan)	13	(1)
Total		321	(37)
- * Club domestic league appearances and goals

Luis Abel Peña (born 7 January 1982 in Asunción, Paraguay) is a Paraguayan former association football midfielder.

== Career ==
Born in Paraguay, Peña started his career with Argentine club Almagro and made his senior debut in the 2001 Clausura match against Rosario Central on 11 February 2001.

Besides Argentina, Peña played in Uruguay, Mexico and Chile for Deportivo Colonia, Correcaminos UAT, Unión San Felipe and Deportes La Serena.
