= Olivier Fontenette =

French footballer (born 1982)

Personal information
- Date of birth: 13 January 1982 (age 44)
- Height: 1.74 m (5 ft 9 in)
- Position: Defender

Youth career
- Paris Saint-Germain FC

Senior career*
Years	Team	Apps	(Gls)
2001–2002	Paris Saint-Germain FC B		
2002–2003	FC Gueugnon	24	(0)
2003–2005	AS Cherbourg		
2005–2006	K.S.K. Beveren	27	(1)
2006–2008	Stade Reims	47	(1)
2008–2009	K.V. Kortrijk	22	(0)
- * Club domestic league appearances and goals as of 17 July 2009

Olivier Fontenette (born 13 January 1982) is a French footballer who played for clubs including K.V. Kortrijk.

== See also ==
- Football in France
- List of football clubs in France
