= Ivan Len =

Ukrainian footballer

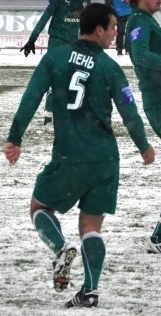

Personal information
- Full name: Ivan Anatoliyovych Len
- Date of birth: 25 July 1982 (age 44)
- Place of birth: Berezhany, Ternopil Oblast, Ukrainian SSR, Soviet Union
- Height: 1.82 m (5 ft 11 1/2 in)
- Position: Midfielder

Senior career*
Years	Team	Apps	(Gls)
2001	Sokil Berezhany	1	(0)
2003–2005	Rava Rava-Ruska	63	(5)
2006–2010	FC Obolon Kyiv	121	(9)
2010–2011	FC Zakarpattia Uzhhorod	15	(0)
- * Club domestic league appearances and goals as of 22 November 2011

Ivan Anatoliyovych Len (Ukrainian: Іван Анатолійович Лень; born 25 July 1982) is a Ukrainian professional football player who played in FC Obolon Kyiv.
