= Tomáš Hájovský =

Slovak footballer

Personal information
- Full name: Tomáš Hájovský
- Date of birth: 10 December 1982 (age 43)
- Place of birth: Lehota pod Vtáčnikom, Czechoslovakia
- Height: 1.96 m (6 ft 5 in)
- Position: Centre back

Youth career
- 1991–2001: OFK Baník Lehota pod Vtáčnikom
- 2001–2003: ŠK Vegum Dolné Vestenice

Senior career*
Years	Team	Apps	(Gls)
2003–2004	Tatran Poštorná		
2004	Raith Rovers	6	(0)
2005	Tatran Prachatice	12	(0)
2006–2008	Baník Sokolov	52	(2)
2009–2012	Viktoria Plzeň	33	(4)
2011–2012	→ Baník Sokolov (loan)	16	(0)
2012–2016	FK Příbram	79	(2)
2015–2016	→ Dynamo České Budějovice (loan)	20	(2)
2016–2017	Tachov		
2017–2019	Jiskra Domažlice	42	(3)
2019	Union Sparta Plzeň		
- * Club domestic league appearances and goals as of 21:23, 13 June 2019 (UTC)

Tomáš Hájovský (born 10 December 1982) is a Slovak footballer who played as a defender. In the 2018–19 season he played for Union Sparta Plzeň.
