= Jacek Gabrusewicz =

Polish footballer

Personal information
- Full name: Jacek Gabrusewicz
- Date of birth: 10 February 1982 (age 44)
- Place of birth: Poland
- Height: 1.78 m (5 ft 10 in)
- Position: Defender

Senior career*
Years	Team	Apps	(Gls)
- MKS Korsze
2000	Stomil Olsztyn	3	(0)
2001–2002	Stomil Olsztyn II		
2002–2004	Warmia i Mazury Olsztyn		
2004–2008	OKS 1945 Olsztyn		
2008–2010	Dolcan Ząbki	36	(1)
2012–2013	OKS 1945 Olsztyn	0	(0)
2012–2013	Pisa Barczewo		
2013–2014	MKS Jeziorany		
2014–2015	SKF Kunki		
2015–2017	MKS Korsze		
2017	Olimpia Olsztynek	14	(3)
2018	MKS Jeziorany	5	(2)
- * Club domestic league appearances and goals

Jacek Gabrusewicz (born 10 February 1982) is a Polish former professional footballer who played as a defender.

== Career ==
=== Club ===
In the summer 2008, he joined Dolcan Ząbki.

In January 2011, he returned to OKS 1945 Olsztyn.
