= Luka Spetič =

Slovenian footballer

Personal information
- Full name: Luka Spetič
- Date of birth: 5 May 1982 (age 44)
- Height: 1.88 m (6 ft 2 in)
- Position: Midfielder

Team information
- Current team: Sistiana

Senior career*
Years	Team	Apps	(Gls)
2001–2004	Tabor Sežana	64	(12)
2004–2006	Primorje	10	(0)
2006–2008	UFM Monfalcone		
2008–2012	Tamai	137	(20)
2012–2013	Delta Porto Tolle	22	(1)
2013–2017	Kras Repen	10	(1)
2017–2022	Cjarlins Muzane	115	(17)
2022–	Sistiana		
- * Club domestic league appearances and goals

Luka Spetič (born 5 May 1982) is a Slovenian footballer who played as midfielder for Sistiana. Since 2017 he played in Serie D for Cjarlins Muzane and in 2022, at the age og 40, he's thinking about retirement.

But in July 2022 he signed for ASD AŠD Sistiana Sesljan, a club from Eccellenza Friuli-Venezia Giulia.
