= Sipho Philip Mutsi =

South African political activist (1967–1985)

Sipho Mutsi
- Born: Sipho Philip Mutsi; 22 December 1967; Kutlwanong, Republic of South Africa
- Died: 5 May 1985 (aged 17); Odendaalsrus, Republic of South Africa
- Occupation: Political activist
- Organization: Congress of South African Students

Sipho Mutsi (22 December 1967 – 5 May 1985) was a South African political activist. A regional organiser for the Congress of South African Students (COSAS), he was arrested at a bus stop in Odendaalsrus, Free State on 4 May 1985. He died in detention the following day, having been severely beaten by some members of the South African Police in Odendaalsrus. He was the first COSAS member to die in police custody.

== Early life ==
Sipho Philip Mutsi was born on 22 December 1967, at King Edward Hospital in Durban. He then went to live in Odendaalsrus in the Free State; and not long after that, his mother – Pulane Irene Mutsi - moved him to live in Mokhalinyana village in Lesotho. Mutsi was a teenager at a time that South Africa had an exceedingly large participation from young people (particularly students) during apartheid, on matters pertaining to politics and unrests thereof.

== Political life ==
Mutsi became one of the leaders of the Congress of South African Students (COSAS) in his township of Kutlwanong. He became even more involved after the Maseru Massacre of December 1982, when South African Defence Force commandos attacked a cluster of houses in Maseru which they believed was where African National Congress exiles were hiding. The Lesotho parliamentary forces were no match for the SADF and by the morning 42 people had died, 30 of them were believed to be African National Congress members; the rest were Lesotho residents including five women and two children. He was particularly affected by this because his parents were born in Lesotho and Sipho spent some early years of his childhood in the country. His political insight was also nurtured by the interaction that he had with South Africans who were exiled in Lesotho during the apartheid era. On 14 December 1984, Mutsi was one of the delegates who attended the COSAS congress which was held at the University of Natal in the Wentworth Campus. Upon return, Mutsi and his comrade Sello Dithebe started influencing learners from school such as Rearabetswe and Phello Secondary School to be more politically active and thus established a COSAS branch.

== Detention and death ==
Mutsi was last seen when he was arrested at a bus stop on 4 May 1985 in Kutlwanong. He was taken into custody at the Odendaalsrus police station, in terms of the Criminal Procedure Act of 1977, for questioning in connection with charges of rioting in the Kutlwanong area. He was pronounced dead on arrival at Pelonomi Hospital in Bloemfontein the next day. His mother maintained that he was already dead when he was taken to hospital.

A police spokesperson said that Mutsi had experienced convulsion while his personal particulars were being recorded and had subsequently fallen during that time, tumbling over a chair he was seated on. The police maintained that during cross examination of Mutsi on 4 May 1985, he had an epileptic seizure. The police stated that Mutsi lost consciousness and was admitted to hospital. Later he was transferred to Pelonomi Hospital in Bloemfontein. However, on admission he was found to be dead. The family of Mutsi maintained that he did not die of an epileptic seizure; although his mother confirmed that he did have some episodes of epileptic seizures sometimes. Thus an Inquest was held. The Truth and Reconciliation Commission of South Africa report states that:

A post mortem on 9 May 1985, attended by an independent physician representing the Mutsi family, found the cause of death to be severe brain haemorrhage.

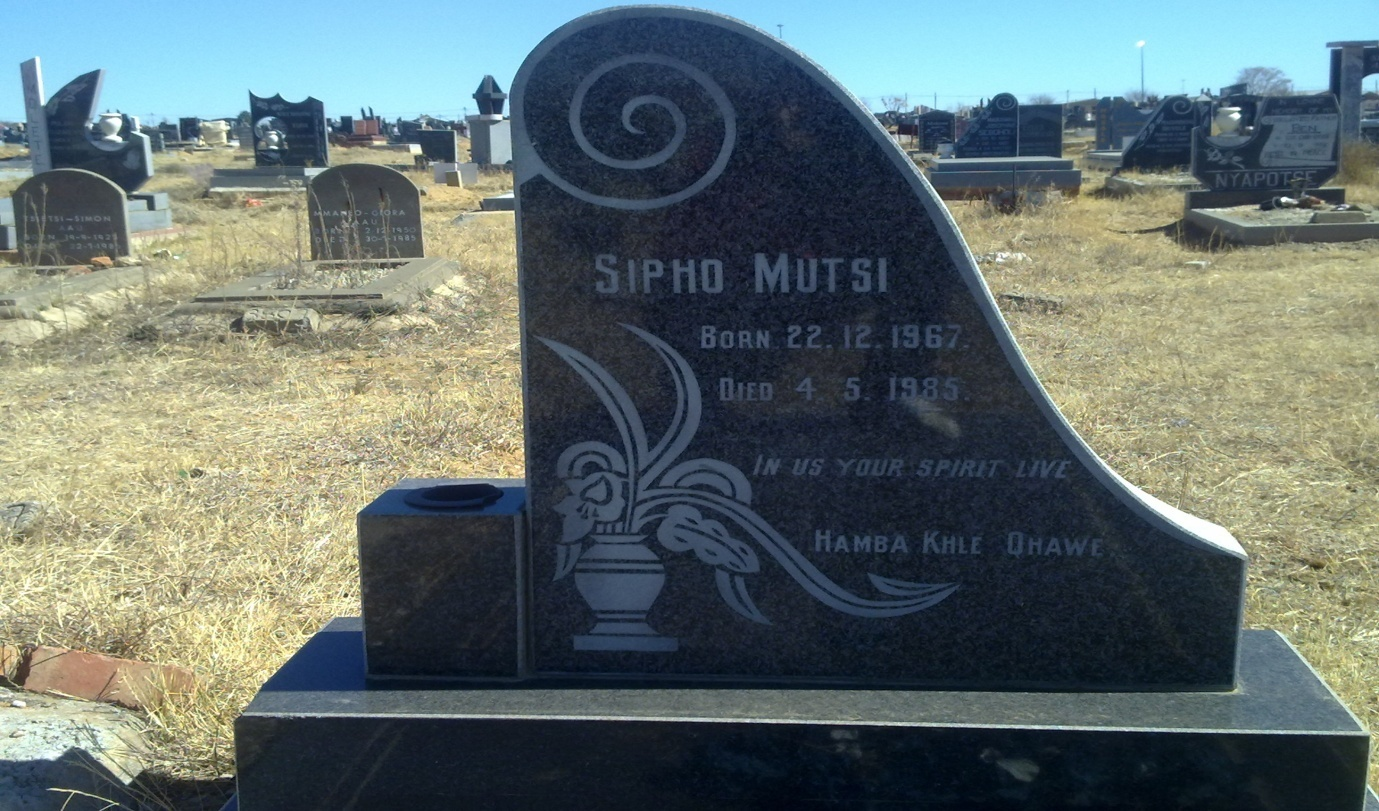
Grave of Sipho Muts Kutlwanong.

During an inquest held in December 1985 at the Welkom Magistrate's Court, Warrant Officer Maxwell Sithole and Detective Constable Magwesa Moya, who had interrogated Sipho Mutsi at the Odendaalsrus police station stated that Mutsi had sat handcuffed on a chair in front of an iron table while he was being interrogated. They further confirmed the previous version by a police spokesperson that he had had an epileptic seizure and had fallen backwards – striking his head on the cemented floor in the process. The couple admitted that Sipho had been in good health and shape when he was admitted into police custody and that whatever injuries he had at the time of his death, must have been sustained during the interrogation. The police could not confirm how Mutsi had incurred injuries to his arms, legs and body which were alleged to be consistent with sjambok marks. In April 1988, a further hearing took place at the Welkom Magistrate's Court. Counsel for the family maintained that the deceased could not have died of an epileptic seizure as the police had alleged. They put it forward that his death was caused by the brutal assault by Warrant Officer Sithole and Constables Samuel Mashabe, and Moya (including two others who have been unnamed). During the inquest, a former detainee, Sello Dithebe (who was also close friends with Mutsi), said that he witnessed a police officer kick Mutsi in the face and that Warrant Officer Sithole had placed a wet canvas bag over his head. At the TRC victim hearings held in Welkom, Dithebe again explained how Mutsi was kicked by police and that when he tried to intervene, he was also assaulted. Dithebe said police influenced some of Mutsi's teachers at his school to testify at the inquest that he was epileptic and thus that being the course of his death.

The circumstances relating to his death were not fully explained, nor understood. According to Dr Jonathan Gluckman (a pathologist who was also appointed by the family of Steve Biko to look into the death of Biko), "state pathologist at the inquest in April 1989, confirmed the cause of death as head injuries with subdural haematoma, and raised intracranial pressure and midbrain haemorrhage".
