= Carmine Giordano =

Italian footballer (born 1982)

Personal information
- Date of birth: 20 March 1982 (age 44)
- Place of birth: Naples, Italy
- Height: 1.75 m (5 ft 9 in)
- Position: Midfielder

Team information
- Current team: Siracusa

Youth career
- –2000: Viribus Unitis

Senior career*
| Years | Team | Apps | (Gls) |
| 2000–2001 | Viribus Unitis | 24 | (1) |
| 2001–2005 | Nocerina | 65 | (7) |
| 2001–2002 | → Battipagliese (loan) | 19 | (2) |
| 2005–2007 | Legnano | 42 | (1) |
| 2007–2010 | Valle del Giovenco | 69 | (2) |
| 2010–2012 | Siracusa | 56 | (1) |
| 2012–2013 | Trapani | 7 | (0) |
| 2013–2014 | Cosenza | 24 | (0) |
| 2014–2015 | Gavorrano | 32 | (0) |
| 2015–2018 | Siracusa | 85 | (1) |
| 2018–2020 | Palazzolo | 0 | (0) |
| 2020–2023 | Siracusa | 50 | (0) |
- * Club domestic league appearances and goals as of 6 May 2018

Carmine Giordano (born 20 March 1982) is an Italian football player. He plays in the role of midfielder for Siracusa.

== Club career ==
He played most of his career in Serie C2, with teams such as Nocerina, Legnano and Pescina.

He joined Palazzolo on 28 August 2018.

On 18 June 2023 he played his last match for Siracusa in the Eccellenza final against Enna and he announced his retirement from football.

== See also ==
- Football in Italy
- List of football clubs in Italy
