= Anton Khromykh =

Ukrainian footballer

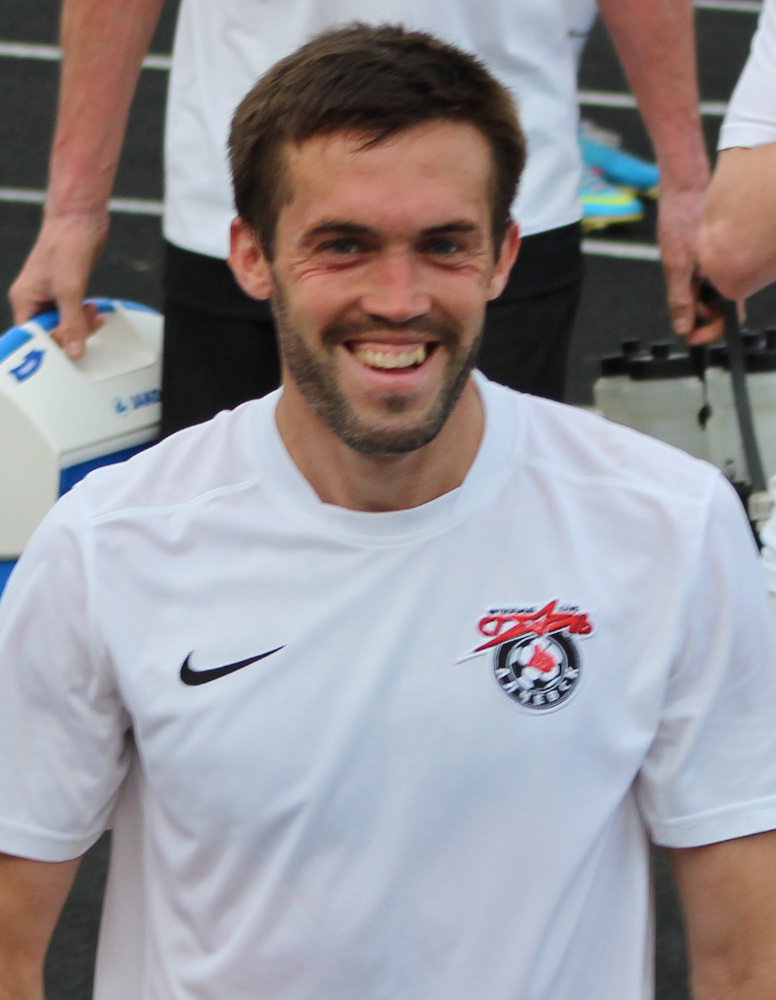

Personal information
- Date of birth: 23 May 1982 (age 44)
- Place of birth: Voroshilovgrad, Ukrainian SSR
- Height: 1.82 m (5 ft 11 1/2 in)
- Position: Midfielder

Youth career
- 1998–2000: Krystal Oleksandria

Senior career*
Years	Team	Apps	(Gls)
2000–2001	Arsenal Kharkiv	4	(1)
2001–2003	Dnepr-Transmash Mogilev	38	(2)
2004–2005	Chornomorets Odesa	17	(0)
2004	→ Chornomorets-2 Odesa	1	(0)
2005–2007	Mykolaiv	43	(4)
2007–2009	Dniester Ovdiopol	111	(8)
2009–2010	Odesa	48	(7)
2010–2013	Helios Kharkiv	57	(5)
2013–2015	Stal Alchevsk	49	(1)
2015	Naftan Novopolotsk	10	(0)
2015–2017	Real Pharma Odesa	47	(8)
2017	Zhemchuzhyna Odesa	6	(0)
- * Club domestic league appearances and goals as of 31 December 2017

Anton Khromykh (Ukrainian: Антон Хромих; born 23 May 1982) is a professional Ukrainian former football midfielder.
