= James Curtis (footballer) =

English footballer

Personal information
- Full name: James Andrew Curtis
- Date of birth: 13 April 1982 (age 44)
- Place of birth: Sunderland, England
- Height: 1.96 m (6 ft 5 in)
- Position: Centre back

Senior career*
Years	Team	Apps	(Gls)
- Kennek Ryhope
- Washington
2003–2016	Gateshead		
2016–2024	Spennymoor Town		
- * Club domestic league appearances and goals

James Andrew Curtis (born 13 April 1982) is an English former footballer who played as a centre back.

== Career ==
Born in Sunderland, Curtis spent his early career with Kennek Ryhope and Washington.

Curtis joined Gateshead in 2003. He turned professional with the club in 2010, aged 28, having previously worked for the local council. He made his 500th appearance for the club in April 2014, becoming the sixth player in the club's history to achieve that feat. He appeared for the club in the National League play-off final later that season. He was released by the club at the end of the 2015–16 season, having made 596 appearances.

Curtis then signed for Spennymoor Town, where he remained until retirement at the end of the 2023–24 season, after 274 appearances for the club.
