= Sipho Mngomezulu =

South African soccer player

Personal information
- Date of birth: 10 October 1982 (age 44)
- Place of birth: Soweto, South Africa
- Height: 1.70 m (5 ft 7 in)
- Position: Right-back

Youth career
- Wits University

Senior career*
Years	Team	Apps	(Gls)
2001–2005	Wits University		
2005–2006	SuperSport United		
2006–2007	FC AK		
2007–2009	Maritzburg United		
2009–2014	Bidvest Wits	58	(0)
2014	Chippa United	3	(0)
2015	Moroka Swallows	5	(0)
2015–2017	Jomo Cosmos	36	(1)
- * Club domestic league appearances and goals as of 8 April 2024

Sipho Mngomezulu (born 10 October 1982) is a South African football (soccer) defender who played for several Premier Soccer League clubs, spending the longest time with Bidvest Wits.
