= Agustín Villar =

Spanish footballer

Agustín
Personal information
- Full name: Agustín Villar Hernando
- Date of birth: 8 July 1982
- Place of birth: Zamora, Spain
- Date of death: 26 July 2013 (aged 31)
- Place of death: Salamanca, Spain
- Height: 1.76 m (5 ft 9 in)
- Position: Midfielder

Senior career*
Years	Team	Apps	(Gls)
2001–2004	Valladolid B		
2003	Valladolid	1	(0)
2004–2005	Vecindario	8	(0)
2005–2007	Guijuelo	34	(1)
2007–2012	Zamora	138	(5)
Total		181+	(6+)
- * Club domestic league appearances and goals

Agustín Villar Hernando (8 July 1982 – 26 July 2013), known simply as Agustín, was a Spanish footballer who played as a midfielder.

== Football career ==
Born in Zamora, Castile and León, Villar began his career at regional club Real Valladolid. He spent the vast majority of his spell associated to the reserves, his only official game with the main squad occurring on 21 June 2003 as he played 24 minutes of a 1–1 draw at Deportivo Alavés after coming on as a substitute for Álvaro Antón, who also made his debut that day.

In 2004, Villar transferred to UD Vecindario, featuring sparingly for the team from the Canary Islands in Segunda División B before returning two years later to his native region and CD Guijuelo, with whom he achieved promotion from Tercera División in his first season.

Villar signed for his hometown's Zamora CF in 2007. In five third-tier campaigns, he played 145 games across all competitions as they contested the promotion play-offs in 2008 and 2009; in his last years, he served as team captain.

== Illness and death ==
Villar received a diagnosis of testicular cancer in late 2011 which curtailed his season, but returned to pre-season training with Zamora in the summer of 2012. He died in hospital in Salamanca on 26 July 2013, at the age of 31, and was buried in his hometown.
