= Alimansi Kadogo =

Ugandan footballer (born 1982)

Personal information
- Date of birth: February 5, 1982 (age 44)
- Place of birth: Uganda
- Position: Midfielder

Youth career
- APR FC

Senior career*
Years	Team	Apps	(Gls)
2000–01	SC Villa	?	(?)
2004–06	Kampala City Council FC	?	(?)
2006–2008	APR FC	?	(?)
2008–present	ATRACO FC		

International career
2004–2007	Uganda		
- * Club domestic league appearances and goals as of January 27, 2007

Alimansi Kadogo (born February 5, 1982) is a Ugandan retired football midfielder who played for ATRACO FC and the Uganda national football team.

Kadogo played for Police F.C. of Rwanda, helping the club to a second-place finish in the 2011–12 Rwanda National Football League and qualification to the 2013 CAF Confederation Cup.
