= 2011 CECAFA Cup squads =

2011 CECAFA Cup squads are the squads that competed in the 2011 CECAFA Cup.

== Group A ==
=== Rwanda ===
No.	Pos.	Player	Date of birth (age)	Caps	Goals	Club
18		Jean Claude Ndori				
11		Olivier Karekezi				
4		Frederick Ndaka				
16		Eric Gasana				
13		Ismail Nshutiyamagara				
12		Jean Claude Iranzi				
3		Albert Ngabo				
7		Jean Baptist Mugiraneza				
8		Haruna Niyonzima				
15		Emery Bayisenge				
5		Meddie Kagere				
1		Jean Luc Ndayishimiye				
9		Tumaini Ntamuhanga				
17		Charles Tibingana				
2		Peter Kagabo				
6		Andrew Butera				
10		Kamana Bokota				
14		Jerome Sina				

=== Tanzania ===
No.	Pos.	Player	Date of birth (age)	Caps	Goals	Club
1	GK	Juma Kaseja				
12		Erasto Nyoni				
14		Hussein Javu				
20		Shomari Kapombe				
4		Juma Nyoso				
19		Shaban Nditi				
5		Bakari Nurdin				
6		Mwinyi Kazimoto				
8		Mrisho Ngasa Khalifan				
16		Ramadhan Chombo				
3		Jabu Juma				
18		Shaban Hassan				
9		Thomas Ulimwengu				
11		Musa Mgosi				
7		Said Maulid				
15		Murad Said				
13		Ibrahim Mwaipopo				

=== Zimbabwe ===
No.	Pos.	Player	Date of birth (age)	Caps	Goals	Club
16		Chigova George				
2		Daniel Veremu				
3		Amin Qadir				
11		Benjamin Marere				
5		Rahman Kutsanzira				
4		James Jam				
7		Tapiwa Khumbuyani				
8		Timire Mavura				
17		Charles Sibanda				
10		Donald Ngoma				
18		Joel Ngodzo				
1		Ariel Sibanda				
19		Honest Moyo				
9		Leonard Fiyado				
12		Tinashe Masika				
13		Thokozo Tshuma				
14		Cliffe Sekete				
15		Magwendere Tongai				
6		Mudzingwa Eric				

== Group B ==
=== Burundi ===
No.	Pos.	Player	Date of birth (age)	Caps	Goals	Club
1	GK	Niyonkuru Vladimr				
14		Floribert Ndayisaba				
15		Gilbert Kaze				
18		Ndayisenga Kevin				
6		Karim Nizigiyimana				
16		Kwizera Pierre				
8		Faty Papy				
7		Kavumbagu Didier				
3		Fwady Ndayisenga				
10		Cedric Amissi				
5		Hassan Hakizimana				
2		Said Nduwimana				
17		Emery Nimubona				
20		Selemani Saidi				
9		Laudy Mavugo				
4		Frederic Nsabiyumva				
13		Steve Nzigimasabo				
12		Gael Duhayindavyi				

=== Somalia ===
No.	Pos.	Player	Date of birth (age)	Caps	Goals	Club
1	GK	Khalid Ali Mursal				
2	DF	Dayib Ahmed				
3	DF	Yassin Ali Egal				
4	DF	Abukar Abdikarim				
5	DF	Sadad Anwar				
6	MF	Mohamed Hassan Ali				
7	MF	Abdinur Mahmoud				
8	FW	Mohamed Abdiaziz				
9	FW	Mohamed Said				
10	FW	Khalid Ali Hassan				
11	MF	Osman Mohamed				
12	DF	Sa'ad Salah Hussein				
13	DF	Hussein Adan				
14	MF	Ikar Amin				
15	MF	Abdullahi Dek				
16	GK	Kamal Ali Omar				
19	FW	Ali Abdulkadir				

=== Uganda ===
No.	Pos.	Player	Date of birth (age)	Caps	Goals	Club
1	GK	Abby Dhaira				
14		Andrew Mweisigwa				
15		Godfrey Walusimbi				
6		Tonny Mawejje				
5		Isaan Isinde				
17		Simon Masaba				
11		Sula Matovu				
2		Musa Mudde				
12		Dan Wagaluka				
8		Mike Sserumaga				
16		Hamis Kiiza				
18	GK	Robert Odongokara				
7		Emanuel Okwi				
13		Moses Oloya				
9		Robert Ssentogo				
3		Habib Kavuma				
20		Patrick Ochan				
4		Henry Kalungi				
10		Mike Mutyaba				
19		Ali Kimera				

=== Zanzibar ===
No.	Pos.	Player	Date of birth (age)	Caps	Goals	Club
18		Mwadini Ali Mwadini				
13		Nadin Haroub				
20		Juma Othuman				
6		Wazir Salum				
14		Abdulham Gulam				
7		Suleiman Kassim				
15		Aggrey Morris				
10		Abdul Halim Humoud				
11		Amir Hamad Omar				
19		Khamis Mcha Khamis				
8		Abdallah Seif Ali				
1		Abbas Nassor				
4		Isamel Khamis				
12		Makame Mbwana				
2		Abdulrahamn Mohamed				
5		Ali Hamza Omar				
9		Jaku Juma Jaku				
17		Ali Mmkanga				

== Group C ==
=== Ethiopia ===
No.	Pos.	Player	Date of birth (age)	Caps	Goals	Club
1		Binyam Habetamu				
2		Degu Debebe				
6		Alula Girma				
5		Ayenalem Hailu				
19		Adane Girma Gebreyes				
8		Tesfaye Gerbe				
16		Tafesse Solomon				
10		Birhanu Bogale				
11		Omod Okwury				
9		Getaneh Kebede				
4		Abebaw Butako				
18		Yedenekachew Kidane				
15		Michael Gari Kena				
3		Tesfaye Bekele				
12		Mengestu Assefa				
20		Yared Zenabu				
17		Dawit Fekadu				
7		Shemeles Bekele Godo				

=== Kenya ===
No.	Pos.	Player	Date of birth (age)	Caps	Goals	Club
1	GK	Duncan Ochieng				
5		Pascal Ochieng				
6		Juma Yusuf				
8		James Mulinge				
13		Collins Okoth				
16		Humphrey Mieno				
17		Stephen Waruru				
7		Titus Mulama				
9		Bob Mugalia				
4		Brian Mandela				
20		Victor Ochieng				
18		Jactone Odhiambo				
12		Stephen Ochola				
3		Dennis Odhiambo				
14		James Situma				
15		Eric Masika				
10		Kevin Kimani				
19		Jockins Atudo				

=== Malawi ===
No.	Pos.	Player	Date of birth (age)	Caps	Goals	Club
1		Charles Swini				
10		Josephy Kambwendo				
3		Steve Chagoma				
19		Ismail Thindwa				
5		James Sangala				
2		John Banda				
7		Pilirani Makupe				
12		Philip Masiye				
13		Chimango Kayira				
15		Loti Chawinga				
18		Ndaziona Chatsalira				
8		Naffe Masasa				
17		Kabichi Henery				
9		Diverson Chilemba				
20		Frank Banda				
11		Gastin Simkonda				
14		Oscar Chapita Oansi				
16		Macdonald Harwa				
4		Maxwell Masiyano				
6		Emanuel Siyeni Zoya				

=== Sudan ===
No.	Pos.	Player	Date of birth (age)	Caps	Goals	Club
16	GK	El Muez Mahgoub				(Sudan Football Association) Al-Hilal Club
17	DF	Mowaia Fadasi				(Sudan Football Association) Al-Ittihad SC (Wad Madani)
7	MF	Ramadan Agab				(Sudan Football Association) Al-Mourada SC
5	DF	Jumaa Ali Kujour				(Sudan Football Association) Al Ahli SC (Khartoum)
19	DF	Amir Kamal				(Sudan Football Association) Al-Mourada SC
20	DF	Abdelrahman Korongo				(Sudan Football Association) Al Khartoum SC
9	MF	Saif Eldin Ali Idris Farah				(Sudan Football Association) Al-Hilal Club
15	MF	Khalefa Ahmed Mohamed				(Sudan Football Association) Al-Hilal Club
14	DF	Najm Eldin Abdallah Abdelgabar				(Sudan Football Association) Al-Merrikh SC
3	DF	Amir Rabea Abdelnabi				(Sudan Football Association) Al-Hilal Club
13	MF	Nizar Hamid				(Sudan Football Association) Alamal SC Atbara
12	MF	Mohamed Musa Mohamed				(Sudan Football Association) Al-Nesoor SC
1	GK	Bahaeddine Rihan				(Sudan Football Association) Jazeerat Al-Feel
10	MF	Muhannad El Tahir				(Sudan Football Association) Al-Hilal Club
4	MF	Mohamed Ahmed Bashir				(Sudan Football Association) Al-Hilal Club
18	FW	Abuelgasim Saeed				(Sudan Football Association) Alamal SC Atbara
8	FW	Mohamed Sheikheldin				(Sudan Football Association) Al Neel SC (Al-Hasahisa)
6	DF	Musaab Omer				(Sudan Football Association) Al-Merrikh SC
2	MF	Omer Mohamed Bakhit				(Sudan Football Association) Al-Hilal Club
11	MF	Majdeldin Abdallah				(Sudan Football Association) Alamal SC Atbara
