= 2014 Kagame Interclub Cup =

CECAFA Club Cup

Tournament details
- Host country: Rwanda
- Dates: 8–24 August
- Teams: 14 (from 11 associations)
- Venues: 2 (in 1 host city)

Final positions
- Champions: (Sudan) Al-Merrikh (3rd title)
- Runners-up: (Rwanda) A.P.R.
- Third place: (Rwanda) Police
- Fourth place: (Uganda) Kampala C.C.A.

Tournament statistics
- Matches played: 34
- Goals scored: 128 (3.76 per match)
- Top scorer: (Uganda) Brian Umony (6 goals)

The 2014 Kagame Interclub Cup was the 39th edition of the Kagame Interclub Cup, which is organised by CECAFA. It is taking place in Kigali, Rwanda from 8–24 August. Rwanda is hosting the tournament for the fourth time since its inception in 1974.

All times shown are in Central Africa Time (UTC+2).

== Broadcasting ==
South African sports channel SuperSport secured official rights to broadcast all matches played at the tournament.

== Participants ==
On 11 July 2014, the draw for clubs to participate in the tournament was released at the Amahoro Stadium, one of the two host venues. Rwandan President Paul Kagame, the sponsor of the tournament, committed a total of US$60,000 for prize money, while an additional US$15,000 was committed to the organisation of the event. Yanga was scheduled as the Tanzanian representative but was removed by CECAFA because the club decided to field a second string side in the tournament which is against the tournament regulation and were replaced by Azam. Just like the reigning Burundi champion Flambeau de l'Est who was replaced by Atlético Olympic and the Ethiopian side Ethiopian Coffee who was replaced by Adama City.

The following 14 clubs took part in the competition:

Group A

- (Rwanda) Rayon Sports
- (Tanzania) Azam
- (Ethiopia) Adama City
- (South Sudan) Atlabara
- (Zanzibar) KMKM

Group B

- (Rwanda) Armée Patriotique Rwandaise
- (Uganda) Kampala Capital City Authority
- (Burundi) Atlético Olympic
- (Kenya) Gor Mahia
- Djibouti Télécom

Group C

- (Burundi) Vital'O
- (Sudan) Al-Merrikh
- (Rwanda) Police
- (Somalia) Benadir

== Group stage ==
The group stage featured fourteen teams, with 5 teams in Group A and B and 4 team in Group C. Three teams from Group A and B and two teams from Group C advanced to the knockout stage.

Tie-breaking criteria for group play
The ranking of teams in each group was based on the following criteria:
1. Number of points obtained in games between the teams involved
2. Goal difference in games between the teams involved
3. Goals scored in games between the teams involved
4. Away goals scored in games between the teams involved
5. Goal difference in all games
6. Goals scored in all games
7. Drawing of lots

The group stage began on 8 August and is scheduled to conclude on 17 August.

=== Group A ===
Team	Pld	W	D	L	GF	GA	GD	Pts
(Rwanda) Rayon Sports	4	3	1	0	4	1	+3	10
(Tanzania) Azam	4	2	2	0	10	3	+7	8
(South Sudan) Atlabara	4	0	3	1	4	5	−1	3
(Ethiopia) Adama City	4	0	2	2	4	8	−4	2
(Zanzibar) KMKM	4	0	2	2	2	7	−5	2

8 August 2014
13:00

Atlabara (South Sudan)	1–1	(Zanzibar) KMKM
Mngwali 45' (o.g.)	Report	Mutawakkil 30' (o.g.)

Amahoro Stadium
Referee: Louis Hakizimana (Rwanda)

8 August 2014
17:00

Rayon Sports (Rwanda)	0–0	(Tanzania) Azam
	Report

Amahoro Stadium
Referee: Alex Muhabi (Uganda)

10 August 2014
15:00

KMKM (Zanzibar)	0–4	(Tanzania) Azam
	Report	Bocco 1'; Saint-Preux 18'; Saint-Preux 29'; Bocco 52'

Amahoro Stadium
Referee: Alex Muhabi (Uganda)

10 August 2014
17:00

Adama City (Ethiopia)	1–2	(Rwanda) Rayon Sports
Mishindo 76'	Report	Kambale 45'; Kambale 65'

Amahoro Stadium
Referee: Andrew Otieno (Kenya)

12 August 2014
15:00

KMKM (Zanzibar)	1–1	(Ethiopia) Adama City
Faki 90'	Report	Mishindo 60'

Stade Régional Nyamirambo
Referee: Andrew Otieno (Kenya)

12 August 2014
17:00

Azam (Tanzania)	2–2	(South Sudan) Atlabara
Bolou 43'; Kavumbagu 86'	Report	Batista 48'; Bony 56'

Stade Régional Nyamirambo
Referee: Alex Muhabi (Uganda)

14 August 2014
13:00

Adama City (Ethiopia)	1–1	(South Sudan) Atlabara
Ibsa 82'	Report	Ajak 22'

Stade Régional Nyamirambo
Referee: Louis Hakizimana (Rwanda)

14 August 2014
17:00

Rayon Sports (Rwanda)	1–0	(Zanzibar) KMKM
Sibomana 22'	Report

Stade Régional Nyamirambo
Referee: Alex Muhabi (Uganda)

16 August 2014
15:00

Adama City (Ethiopia)	1–4	(Tanzania) Azam
Debesh 39'	Report	Bocco 29'; Kavumbagu 55'; Khamis 60'; Tchetche 74'

Stade Régional Nyamirambo
Referee: Hassan Mohamed Hagi (Sudan)

16 August 2014
17:00

Rayon Sports (Rwanda)	1–0	(South Sudan) Atlabara
Motombo 85'	Report

Stade Régional Nyamirambo
Referee: Alex Muhabi (Uganda)

=== Group B ===
Team	Pld	W	D	L	GF	GA	GD	Pts
(Uganda) Kampala C.C.A.	4	3	0	1	5	3	+2	9
(Rwanda) A.P.R.	4	2	1	1	4	3	+1	7
(Burundi) Atlético Olympic	4	2	0	2	3	3	0	6
Djibouti Télécom	4	1	1	2	5	6	−1	4
(Kenya) Gor Mahia	4	0	2	2	5	7	−2	2

8 August 2014
15:00

Gor Mahia (Kenya)	1–2	(Uganda) Kampala C.C.A.
Sserunkuma 27'	Report	Majwega 53'; Umony 88'

Amahoro Stadium
Referee: Gervais Munyanziza (Rwanda)

9 August 2014
17:00

A.P.R. (Rwanda)	1–0	(Burundi) Atlético Olympic
Nshutiyamagara 90'	Report

Amahoro Stadium
Referee: Anthony Ogwayo (Kenya)

10 August 2014
13:00

Djibouti Télécom	2–1	(Uganda) Kampala C.C.A.
Mustapha 43'; Djama 89'	Report	Wadri 60'

Stade Régional Nyamirambo
Referee: Gervais Munyanziza (Rwanda)

11 August 2014
15:00

Gor Mahia (Kenya)	0–1	(Burundi) Atlético Olympic
	Report	Hakizimana 72'

Stade Régional Nyamirambo
Referee: Israel Mujuni (Tanzania)

13 August 2014
15:00

Kampala C.C.A. (Uganda)	1–0	(Burundi) Atlético Olympic
Umony 22' (pen.)	Report

Stade Régional Nyamirambo
Referee: Hassan Mohamed Hagi (Somalia)

13 August 2014
17:00

A.P.R. (Rwanda)	1–0	Djibouti Télécom
Bayisenge 41'	Report

Stade Régional Nyamirambo
Referee: Israel Mujuni (Tanzania)

15 August 2014
13:00

Atlético Olympic (Burundi)	2–1	Djibouti Télécom
Ramadhan 10'; Fiston 85'	Report	Mohamed 28'

Stade Régional Nyamirambo
Referee: Hassan Mohamed Hagi (Somalia)

15 August 2014
17:00

A.P.R. (Rwanda)	2–2	(Kenya) Gor Mahia
Mugiraneza 22'; Mubumbvi 90'	Report	Kizito 60'; Walusimbi 81'

Stade Régional Nyamirambo
Referee: Israel Mujuni (Tanzania)

17 August 2014
15:00

Djibouti Télécom	2–2	(Kenya) Gor Mahia
Djama 38'; Andasanco 74' (pen.)	Report	Otieno 57'; Mohammed 90'

Stade Régional Nyamirambo
Referee: Gervais Munyanziza (Rwanda)

17 August 2014
17:00

Kampala C.C.A. (Uganda)	1–0	(Rwanda) A.P.R.
Bengo 70'	Report

Stade Régional Nyamirambo
Referee: Anthony Ogwayo (Kenya)

=== Group C ===
Team	Pld	W	D	L	GF	GA	GD	Pts
(Rwanda) Police	3	3	0	0	7	2	+5	9
(Sudan) Al-Merrikh	3	1	1	1	5	2	+3	4
(Burundi) Vital'O	3	1	1	1	7	5	+2	4
(Somalia) Benadir	3	0	0	3	2	12	−10	0

9 August 2014
13:00

Vital'O (Burundi)	5–1	(Somalia) Benadir
Ndikumana 15'; Moussa 45' (pen.); Mavugo 71'; Shabani 87'; Osman 90' (o.g.)	Report	Ali 83'

Amahoro Stadium
Referee: Abdul Karim Twagirumukiza (Rwanda)

9 August 2014
15:00

Police (Rwanda)	1–0	(Sudan) Al-Merrikh
Atuhire 16'	Report

Amahoro Stadium
Referee: Israel Mujuni (Tanzania)

11 August 2014
13:00

Benadir (Somalia)	0–4	(Sudan) Al-Merrikh
	Report	Wanga 18'; El-Basha 33'; Traoré 61'; Wawa 85'

Stade Régional Nyamirambo
Referee: Louis Hakizimana (Rwanda)

11 August 2014
17:00

Vital'O (Burundi)	1–3	(Rwanda) Police
Shabani 38'	Report	Sina 30'; Tuyisenge 44'; Mbaraga 69'

Stade Régional Nyamirambo
Referee: Anthony Ogwayo (Kenya)

14 August 2014
15:00

Police (Rwanda)	3–1	(Somalia) Benadir
Atuhire 1'; Habimana 10'; Tuyisenge 70'	Report	Garba 67'

Stade Régional Nyamirambo
Referee: Andrew Otieno (Kenya)

15 August 2014
15:00

Al-Merrikh (Sudan)	1–1	(Burundi) Vital'O
Traoré 63'	Report	Mavugo 34'

Stade Régional Nyamirambo
Referee: Anthony Ogwayo (Kenya)

== Knockout stage ==
In the knockout stage, teams play against each other once. The losers of the semi-finals played against each other in a third place playoff where the winner was placed third overall in the entire competition.

=== Bracket ===
Quarter-finals
19 August
(Rwanda) Police	0 (9)
(Burundi) Atlético Olympic	0 (8)
19 August
(Rwanda) Rayon Sports	2 (3)
(Rwanda) A.P.R.	2 (4)
20 August
(Tanzania) Azam	0 (3)
(Sudan) Al-Merrikh	0 (4)
20 August
(Uganda) Kampala C.C.A.	3
(South Sudan) Atlabara	1

Semi-finals
22 August
(Rwanda) Police	0 (2)
(Rwanda) A.P.R.	0 (4)
22 August
(Sudan) Al-Merrikh	2 (3)
(Uganda) Kampala C.C.A.	2 (0)

Final
24 August
(Rwanda) A.P.R.	0
(Sudan) Al-Merrikh	1
Third place
24 August
(Rwanda) Police	1 (4)
(Uganda) Kampala C.C.A.	1 (2)

=== Quarter-finals ===
19 August 2014
14:30

Police (Rwanda)	0–0 (90 min.)	(Burundi) Atlético Olympic
	Report
Penalties
Ndaka (penalty missed); Mbaraga (penalty missed); Tuyisenge (penalty scored); Sina (penalty scored); Habimana (penalty scored); Ngendahimana (penalty scored); Twagizimana (penalty scored); Kagabo (penalty scored); Mugabo (penalty scored); Mutuyimana (penalty scored); Nzarora (penalty scored)	9–8	Fiston (penalty missed); Unidentified (penalty missed); Akimana (penalty scored); Muhuza (penalty scored); Ramadhan (penalty scored); Hakizimana (penalty scored); Bukuru (penalty scored); Hakizimana (penalty scored); Hakizimana (penalty scored); Dieduonne (penalty scored); Akimana (penalty missed)

Stade Régional Nyamirambo
Referee: Anthony Ogwayo (Kenya)

19 August 2014
17:00

Rayon Sports (Rwanda)	2–2 (90 min.)	(Rwanda) A.P.R.
Bertrand 43'; Ndayisenga 45'	Report	Ndahinduka 11'; Rugwiro 55'
Penalties
Tubane (penalty missed); Motombo (penalty scored); Sibomana (penalty scored); Kambale (penalty scored); Ndayisenga (penalty missed)	3–4	Nshutimayagara (penalty missed); Mukunzi (penalty scored); Tibingana (penalty scored); Rutanga (penalty scored); Mugiraneza (penalty scored)

Stade Régional Nyamirambo
Referee: Alex Muhabi (Uganda)

20 August 2014
14:30

Azam (Tanzania)	0–0 (90 min.)	(Sudan) Al-Merrikh
	Report
Penalties
Nyoni (penalty scored); Kavumbagu (penalty scored); Morris (penalty scored); Kapombe (penalty missed); Saint-Preux (penalty missed)	3–4	El-Basha (penalty missed); Said (penalty scored); Gafer (penalty scored); Wanga (penalty scored); Magdi (penalty scored)

Stade Régional Nyamirambo
Referee: Andrew Otieno (Kenya)

20 August 2014
17:00

Kampala C.C.A. (Uganda)	3–1	(South Sudan) Atlabara
Majwega 4'; Umony 32'; Senkumba 74'	Report	Oliver 88' (pen.)

Stade Régional Nyamirambo
Referee: Hassan Mohamed Hagi (Sudan)

=== Semi-finals ===
22 August 2014
18:00

Police (Rwanda)	0–0 (90 min.) 0–0 (120 min.)	(Rwanda) A.P.R.
	Report
Penalties
Sina (penalty scored); Mutuyimana (penalty scored); Tuyisenge (penalty missed); Mbaraga (penalty missed)	2–4	Rutanga (penalty missed); Nshutimayagara (penalty scored); Mukunzi (penalty scored); Sibomana (penalty scored); Mugiraneza (penalty scored)

Amahoro Stadium
Referee: Anthony Ogwayo (Kenya)

22 August 2014
15:00

Al-Merrikh (Sudan)	2–2 (120 min.)	(Uganda) Kampala C.C.A.
Mugabi 28' (o.g.); Abdel-Aati 46'	Report	Masiko 45'; Umony 57'
Penalties
Wanga (penalty missed); Bala (penalty scored); Agab (penalty scored); Magonda (penalty scored)	3–0	Umony (penalty missed); Masiko (penalty missed); Majwega (penalty missed)

Amahoro Stadium
Referee: Israel Mujuni (Tanzania)

=== Third place playoff ===
24 August 2014
15:00

Police (Rwanda)	1–1 (120 min.)	(Uganda) Kampala C.C.A.
Mbaraga 34'	Report	Umony 49'
Penalties
Tuyisenge (penalty scored); Ndaka (penalty scored); Uwimana (penalty scored); Ngendahimana (penalty scored)	4–2	Kavuma (penalty missed); Umony (penalty scored); Masiko (penalty scored); Kasagga (penalty missed)

Amahoro Stadium
Referee: Hassan Mohamed Hagi (Sudan)

=== Final ===
24 August 2014
18:00

Al-Merrikh (Sudan)	1–0	(Rwanda) A.P.R.
Wanga 24'	Report

Amahoro Stadium
Referee: Andrew Otieno (Kenya)

2014 Kagame Interclub Cup champions

3rd title

== Top scorers ==
Rank	Name	Team	Goals
1	(Tanzania) John Bocco	(Tanzania) Azam	3
2	(Ethiopia) Wendosen Mishindo	(Ethiopia) Adama City	2
2	(Mali) Mohamed Traoré	(Sudan) Al-Merrikh	2
2	(Haiti) Leonel Saint-Preux	(Tanzania) Azam	2
2	(Burundi) Didier Kavumbagu	(Tanzania) Azam	2
2	(Djibouti) Mustapha Mohamed	Djibouti Télécom	2
2	(Djibouti) Aboubaker Djama	Djibouti Télécom	2
2	(Uganda) Brian Umony	(Uganda) Kampala C.C.A.	2
2	(Uganda) Atuheire Kipson	(Rwanda) Police	2
2	(Rwanda) Jacques Tuyisenge	(Rwanda) Police	2
2	(Democratic Republic of the Congo) Salita Gentil Kambale	(Rwanda) Rayon Sports	2
2	(Burundi) Hussein Shabani	(Burundi) Vital'O	2
2	(Burundi) Laudit Mavugo	(Burundi) Vital'O	2
14	(Ethiopia) Desaleny Debesh	(Ethiopia) Adama City	1
14	(Ethiopia) Ibsa	(Ethiopia) Adama City	1
14	(Ivory Coast) Serge Wawa	(Sudan) Al-Merrikh	1
14	(Sudan) Ahmed El-Basha	(Sudan) Al-Merrikh	1
14	(Kenya) Allan Wanga	(Sudan) Al-Merrikh	1
14	(Rwanda) Ismail Nshutiyamagara	(Rwanda) A.P.R.	1
14	(Rwanda) Emery Bayisenge	(Rwanda) A.P.R.	1
14	(Rwanda) Jean-Baptiste Mugiraneza	(Rwanda) A.P.R.	1
14	(Rwanda) Barnabe Mubumbyi	(Rwanda) A.P.R.	1
14	(South Sudan) Sebit Ajak	(South Sudan) Atlabara	1
14	(South Sudan) Martin Bony	(South Sudan) Atlabara	1
14	(South Sudan) Thomas Batista	(South Sudan) Atlabara	1
14	(Burundi) Nzomukunda Fiston	(Burundi) Atlético Olympic	1
14	(Burundi) Niragira Ramadhan	(Burundi) Atlético Olympic	1
14	(Burundi) Alexis Hakizimana	(Burundi) Atlético Olympic	1
14	(Tanzania) Wilfred Bolou	(Tanzania) Azam	1
14	(Zanzibar) Khamis Mcha Khamis	(Tanzania) Azam	1
14	(Ivory Coast) Kipre Tchetche	(Tanzania) Azam	1
14	(Somalia) Abdi Rizak Ali	(Somalia) Benadir	1
14	(Somalia) Mustapha Garba	(Somalia) Benadir	1
14	(Djibouti) Fred Andasanco	Djibouti Télécom	1
14	(Uganda) Dan Sserunkuma	(Kenya) Gor Mahia	1
14	(Uganda) Geoffrey Kizito	(Kenya) Gor Mahia	1
14	(Uganda) Godfrey Walusimbi	(Kenya) Gor Mahia	1
14	(Kenya) Timothy Otieno	(Kenya) Gor Mahia	1
14	(Kenya) Musa Mohammed (footballer)	(Kenya) Gor Mahia	1
14	(Uganda) Brian Majwega	(Uganda) Kampala C.C.A.	1
14	(Uganda) William Wadri	(Uganda) Kampala C.C.A.	1
14	(Uganda) Stephen Bengo	(Uganda) Kampala C.C.A.	1
14	(Tanzania) Juma Faki	(Zanzibar) KMKM	1
14	(Rwanda) Mousa Habimana	(Rwanda) Police	1
14	(Rwanda) Jimmy Mbaraga	(Rwanda) Police	1
14	(Rwanda) Jerome Sina	(Rwanda) Police	1
14	(Rwanda) Abouba Sibomana	(Rwanda) Rayon Sports	1
14	(Rwanda) Govin Motombo	(Rwanda) Rayon Sports	1
14	(Burundi) Mossi Moussa	(Burundi) Vital'O	1
14	(Rwanda) Hamad Ndikumana	(Burundi) Vital'O	1

=== Own goals ===
Rank	Name	Team	Opponent(s)	Own goals
1	(Somalia) Mustafa Hassan Osman	(Somalia) Benadir	(Burundi) Vital'O	1
1	(Zanzibar) Mwinyi Haji Mngwali	(Zanzibar) KMKM	(South Sudan) Atlabara	1
1	(South Sudan) Karim Mutawakkil	(South Sudan) Atlabara	(Zanzibar) KMKM	1
