= 2012 Africa Cup of Nations Group B =

Football tournament group stage

Group B of the 2012 Africa Cup of Nations ran from 22 January until 30 January. It consisted of Angola, Burkina Faso, Ivory Coast and Sudan. The matches were held in Equatorial Guinea. Ivory Coast and Sudan progressed to the quarterfinals.

== Standings ==
Pos	Team	Pld	W	D	L	GF	GA	GD	Pts	Qualification
1	Ivory Coast	3	3	0	0	5	0	+5	9	Advance to knockout stage
2	Sudan	3	1	1	1	4	4	0	4	Advance to knockout stage
3	Angola	3	1	1	1	4	5	−1	4	
4	Burkina Faso	3	0	0	3	2	6	−4	0	

Source: CAF

All times are West Africa Time (UTC+1).

== Ivory Coast vs. Sudan ==
22 January 2012
17:00

Ivory Coast	1–0	Sudan
Drogba 39'	Report

Estadio de Malabo, Malabo
Attendance: 5,000
Referee: Rajindraparsad Seechurn (Mauritius)

Ivory Coast	Sudan

GK	1	Boubacar Barry
DF	4	Kolo Touré
DF	17	Siaka Tiéné
DF	20	Igor Lolo
DF	22	Sol Bamba
MF	19	Yaya Touré
MF	9	Cheick Tioté		(substituted off) 80'
MF	6	Jean-Jacques Gosso	(yellow card) 83'
MF	11	Didier Drogba (c)
FW	8	Salomon Kalou		(substituted off) 63'
FW	10	Gervinho
Substitutions:
MF	15	Max Gradel		(substituted on) 63'
MF	18	Abdul Kader Keïta		(substituted on) 80'
Manager:
François Zahoui

GK	16	El Muez Mahgoub
DF	4	Najm Eldin Abdullah	(yellow card) 15'
DF	3	Mowaia Bashir
DF	13	Amir Kamal		(substituted off) 62'
DF	5	Ala'a Eldin Yousif	(yellow card) 83'
MF	8	Haitham Mustafa (c)
MF	9	Saif Eldin Ali Idris Farah
MF	14	Balla Jabir
MF	19	Mohamed Ahmed Bashir		(substituted off) 74'
MF	23	Nizar Hamid
FW	17	Mudather Karika
Substitutions:
MF	12	Bader Eldin Abdalla Galag		(substituted on) 62'
MF	10	Muhannad El Tahir		(substituted on) 74'
Manager:
Mohamed Abdallah

Assistant referees:
Balkrishna Bootun (Mauritius)
Angessom Ogbamariam (Eritrea)
Fourth official:
Hamada Nampiandraza (Madagascar)

== Burkina Faso vs. Angola ==
22 January 2012
20:00

Burkina Faso	1–2	Angola
A. Traoré 58'	Report	Mateus Galiano 48'; Manucho 68'

Estadio de Malabo, Malabo
Attendance: 17,000
Referee: Mohamed Benouza (Algeria)

Burkina Faso	Angola

GK	1	Daouda Diakité
DF	6	Bakary Koné
DF	4	Mamadou Tall	(yellow card) 90+1'
DF	17	Paul Koulibaly		(substituted off) 50'
DF	10	Alain Traoré
MF	18	Charles Kaboré
MF	7	Florent Rouamba		(substituted off) 59'
MF	5	Mohamed Koffi	(yellow card) 7'
MF	3	Djakaridja Koné
MF	11	Jonathan Pitroipa
FW	9	Moumouni Dagano (c)
Substitutions:
DF	22	Saïdou Panandétiguiri		(substituted on) 50'
FW	13	Aristide Bancé		(substituted on) 59'
Manager:
(Portugal) Paulo Duarte

GK	13	Carlos	(yellow card) 90+6'
DF	2	Marco Airosa
DF	10	Zuela
DF	4	Dani Massunguna
DF	8	André Macanga (c)		(substituted off) 90+5'
MF	11	Gilberto
MF	15	Miguel
MF	16	Flávio		(substituted off) 62'
MF	17	Mateus Galiano	(yellow card) 19'
FW	7	Djalma		(substituted off) 90+4'
FW	9	Manucho
Substitutions:
MF	6	Dedé		(substituted on) 62'
MF	12	Jaime		(substituted on) 90+4'
FW	23	Vunguidica		(substituted on) 90+5'
Manager:
Lito Vidigal

Assistant referees:
Abdelhak Etchiali (Algeria)
Jean-Claude Birumushahu (Burundi)
Fourth official:
Gehad Grisha (Egypt)

== Sudan vs. Angola ==
26 January 2012
17:00

Sudan	2–2	Angola
Bashir 32', 74'	Report	Manucho 4', 50' (pen.)

Estadio de Malabo, Malabo
Attendance: 2,500
Referee: Ali Lemghaifry (Mauritania)

Sudan	Angola

GK	21	Akram El Hadi Salim
DF	4	Najm Eldin Abdullah
DF	3	Mowaia Bashir	(yellow card) 9'
DF	5	Ala'a Eldin Yousif
DF	14	Balla Jabir	(yellow card) 86'
MF	8	Haitham Mustafa (c)		(substituted off) 64'
MF	9	Saif Eldin Ali Idris Farah
MF	19	Mohamed Ahmed Bashir
MF	23	Nizar Hamid
FW	10	Muhannad El Tahir
FW	17	Mudathir Karika		(substituted off) 89'
Substitutions:
MF	12	Bader Eldin Abdalla Galag		(substituted on) 64'
FW	7	Ramadan Agab		(substituted on) 89'
Manager:
Mohamed Abdalla Ahmed

GK	13	Carlos	(yellow card) 70'
DF	2	Marco Airosa
DF	10	Zuela
DF	4	Dani Massunguna
DF	8	André Macanga (c)
MF	11	Gilberto	(yellow card) 23'
MF	15	Miguel
MF	16	Flávio		(substituted off) 46'
MF	17	Mateus Galiano
FW	7	Djalma		(substituted off) 82'
FW	9	Manucho
Substitutions:
FW	19	Nando Rafael	(yellow card) 60'	(substituted on) 46' (substituted off) 73'
FW	23	Vunguidica		(substituted on) 73'
FW	20	Manucho Barros		(substituted on) 82'
Manager:
Lito Vidigal

Assistant referees:
Jason Damoo (Seychelles)
David Shaanika (Namibia)
Fourth official:
Eric Otogo-Castane (Gabon)

== Ivory Coast vs. Burkina Faso ==
26 January 2012
20:00

Ivory Coast	2–0	Burkina Faso
Kalou 16'; B. Koné 82' (o.g.)	Report

Estadio de Malabo, Malabo
Attendance: 4,000
Referee: Gehad Grisha (Egypt)

Ivory Coast	Burkina Faso

GK	1	Boubacar Barry
DF	4	Kolo Touré
DF	17	Siaka Tiéné	(yellow card) 28'	(substituted off) 72'
DF	22	Sol Bamba
MF	5	Didier Zokora	(yellow card) 57'
MF	19	Yaya Touré		(substituted off) 80'
MF	9	Cheick Tioté	(yellow card) 77'
MF	6	Jean-Jacques Gosso
FW	11	Didier Drogba (c)
FW	8	Salomon Kalou	(yellow card) 40'	(substituted off) 63'
FW	10	Gervinho
Substitutions:
MF	15	Max Gradel		(substituted on) 63'
DF	3	Arthur Boka		(substituted on) 72'
FW	12	Wilfried Bony		(substituted on) 80'
Manager:
François Zahoui

GK	1	Daouda Diakité
DF	22	Saïdou Panandétiguiri
DF	6	Bakary Koné
DF	4	Mamadou Tall
MF	8	Mahamoudou Kéré (c)		(substituted off) 73'
MF	10	Alain Traoré		(substituted off) 87'
MF	18	Charles Kaboré	(yellow card) 32'
MF	5	Mohamed Koffi
MF	11	Jonathan Pitroipa
FW	12	Prejuce Nakoulma		(substituted off) 75'
FW	9	Moumouni Dagano
Substitutions:
MF	7	Florent Rouamba		(substituted on) 73'
FW	13	Aristide Bancé		(substituted on) 75'
FW	15	Narcisse Yaméogo		(substituted on) 87'
Manager:
(Portugal) Paulo Duarte

Assistant referees:
Evarist Menkouande (Cameroon)
Marwa Range (Kenya)
Fourth official:
Slim Jedidi (Tunisia)

== Sudan vs. Burkina Faso ==
30 January 2012
19:00

Sudan	2–1	Burkina Faso
Karika 33', 79'	Report	Ouédraogo 90+5'

Estadio de Bata, Bata
Attendance: 132
Referee: Eric Otogo-Castane (Gabon)

Sudan	Burkina Faso

GK	21	Akram Salim
DF	4	Najm Eldin Abdullah		(substituted off) 6'
DF	3	Mowaia Bashir
DF	5	Ala'a Eldin Yousif
MF	8	Haitham Mustafa (c)
MF	9	Saif Eldin Ali Idris Farah	(yellow card) 67'
MF	19	Mohamed Ahmed Bashir		(substituted off) 90+3'
MF	15	Khalefa Ahmed Mohamed
MF	23	Nizar Hamid
FW	10	Muhannad El Tahir		(substituted off) 90+4'
FW	17	Mudather Karika
Substitutions:
DF	6	Musaab Omer		(substituted on) 6'
FW	7	Ramadan Agab		(substituted on) 90+3'
DF	13	Amir Kamal		(substituted on) 90+4'
Manager:
Mohamed Abdallah

GK	1	Daouda Diakité
DF	22	Saïdou Panandétiguiri	(yellow card) 35'
DF	2	Ibrahim Gnanou
DF	4	Mamadou Tall
MF	18	Charles Kaboré
MF	5	Mohamed Koffi
MF	3	Djakaridja Koné		(substituted off) 78'
MF	11	Jonathan Pitroipa
FW	12	Prejuce Nakoulma		(substituted off) 55'
FW	9	Moumouni Dagano (c)
FW	15	Narcisse Yaméogo		(substituted off) 65'
Substitutions:
FW	20	Issiaka Ouédraogo		(substituted on) 55'
MF	19	Bertrand Traoré		(substituted on) 65'
MF	14	Benjamin Balima		(substituted on) 78'
Manager:
(Portugal) Paulo Duarte

Assistant referees:
Djibril Camara (Senegal)
Jean-Claude Birumushahu (Burundi)
Fourth official:
Badara Diatta (Senegal)

== Ivory Coast vs. Angola ==
30 January 2012
19:00

Ivory Coast	2–0	Angola
Eboué 33'; Bony 64'	Report

Estadio de Malabo, Malabo
Attendance: 1,500
Referee: Slim Jedidi (Tunisia)

Ivory Coast	Angola

GK	16	Daniel Yeboah
DF	4	Kolo Touré (c)
DF	3	Arthur Boka
DF	20	Igor Lolo	(yellow card) 57'	(substituted off) 87'
DF	22	Sol Bamba
DF	21	Emmanuel Eboué		(substituted off) 60'
MF	14	Kafoumba Coulibaly
MF	15	Max Gradel
FW	7	Seydou Doumbia		(substituted off) 79'
FW	13	Didier Ya Konan
FW	12	Wilfried Bony
Substitutions:
MF	18	Abdul Kader Keïta	(yellow card) 90+3'	(substituted on) 60'
FW	11	Didier Drogba		(substituted on) 79'
DF	2	Benjamin Angoua		(substituted on) 87'
Manager:
François Zahoui

GK	1	Wilson
DF	2	Marco Airosa
DF	10	Zuela
DF	4	Dani Massunguna	(yellow card) 70'
MF	8	André Macanga (c)	(yellow card) 22'	(substituted off) 66'
MF	6	Dedé
MF	11	Gilberto
MF	15	Miguel		(substituted off) 83'
FW	17	Mateus Galiano
FW	7	Djalma		(substituted off) 80'
FW	9	Manucho
Substitutions:
FW	19	Nando Rafael		(substituted on) 66'
FW	23	Vunguidica		(substituted on) 80'
FW	18	Love		(substituted on) 83'
Manager:
Lito Vidigal

Assistant referees:
Balla Diarra (Mali)
Felicien Kabanda (Rwanda)
Fourth official:
Koman Coulibaly (Mali)
