= 2010 Bani Yas International Tournament =

Tournament details
- Host country: United Arab Emirates
- Dates: 8 February – 13 February
- Teams: 4 (from 2 confederations)
- Venue: 1 (in 1 host city)

Final positions
- Champions: (Sudan) Al-Hilal (1st title)
- Runners-up: (United Arab Emirates) Bani Yas
- Third place: (Jordan) Al-Wehdat
- Fourth place: (Bahrain) Al-Muharraq

Tournament statistics
- Matches played: 4
- Goals scored: 9 (2.25 per match)

The Bani Yas International Tournament is a yearly football tournament that takes place in Abu Dhabi in the United Arab Emirates that began in 2010.

The champion of the 2010 edition was Al-Hilal.

== Participant teams ==
(Jordan) Al-Wehdat
(Sudan) Al-Hilal
(United Arab Emirates) Bani Yas
(Bahrain) Al-Muharraq SC

== Fixtures ==
Monday 8 Feb 2010

(United Arab Emirates) Bani Yas	2 – 1	(Jordan) Al-Wehdat SC
Modibo Diara 16' (pen.) Andre Senghor 24'	Report	Raf'at Ali 35' (pen.)

Bani Yas Stadium
Wednesday 10 Feb 2010

(Bahrain) Al-Muharraq SC	0 – 2 (a.e.t.)	(Sudan) Al-Hilal
	Report	Muhannad 24', 91'

Bani Yas Stadium

== Final ==
Saturday 13 Feb 2010

(United Arab Emirates) Bani Yas	2 – 2	(Sudan) Al-Hilal
Andre Senghor 18' Rasheed Abdullah 58'	Report	78' (own goal) Khalifa 90'
Penalties
	4 - 5

Bani Yas Stadium

== Champion ==
Bani Yas International Tournament
2010 Winners
Al-Hilal

== See also ==
Bani Yas International Tournament
