= 2011 Bani Yas International Tournament =

Tournament details
- Host country: United Arab Emirates
- Dates: 16 August – 23 August
- Teams: 4 (from 2 confederations)
- Venue: 1 (in 1 host city)

Final positions
- Champions: (Saudi Arabia) Al-Nassr (1st title)
- Runners-up: (Tunisia) Sportif Sfaxien
- Third place: (United Arab Emirates) Bani Yas
- Fourth place: (Syria) Al-Jaish

Tournament statistics
- Matches played: 6
- Goals scored: 20 (3.33 per match)

The Bani Yas International Tournament is a yearly football tournament that takes place in Abu Dhabi in the United Arab Emirates that began in 2010.

The champion of the 2011 edition was Al-Nassr.

== Participant teams ==
(Tunisia) Sportif Sfaxien
(Syria) Al-Jaish
(United Arab Emirates) Bani Yas
(Saudi Arabia) Al-Nassr

== Fixtures ==
Tuesday 16 Aug 2011

(United Arab Emirates) Bani Yas	2 – 1	(Saudi Arabia) Al-Nassr
Nawaf Mubarak 5' Fareed Ismaeel 47'	Report	Al-Sahlawi 61'

Bani Yas Stadium
Wednesday 17 Aug 2011

(Tunisia) Club Sportif Sfaxien	4 – 1 (a.e.t.)	(Syria) Al-Jaish
Ibrahim Khalil Sylla 8', 28', 33', 55'	Report	Mutaz Kailouni 11'

Bani Yas Stadium
Friday 19 August 2011

(Saudi Arabia) Al-Nassr	2 – 1	(Tunisia) Club Sportif Sfaxien
Ahmad Aljaizani 66' Khaled Al-Zylaeei 80'	Report	Rabie WERGHEMI 71'

Bani Yas Stadium
Friday 20 August 2011

(United Arab Emirates) Bani Yas	1 – 0	(Syria) Al-Jaish
Andre Senghor 4'	Report

Bani Yas Stadium
Friday 22 August 2011

(Saudi Arabia) Al-Nassr	4 – 1	(Syria) Al-Jaish
Khaled Al-Zylaeei 15' Abdulrahman Al-Qahtani 58' Ahmad Aljaizani 63' Saad Al-Harthi 93'	Report	75'

Bani Yas Stadium
Friday 23 August 2011

(United Arab Emirates) Bani Yas	1 – 2	(Tunisia) Club Sportif Sfaxien
Andre Senghor 13'	Report	Naby Soumah 77' Hamdi Rouid 88'

Bani Yas Stadium

== Final League Table ==
Pos	Team	Pld	W	D	L	GF	GA	GD	Pts
1	Al-Nassr	3	2	0	1	7	4	+3	3
2	Sportif Sfaxien	3	2	0	1	7	4	+3	3
3	Bani Yas SC	3	2	0	1	4	3	+1	6
4	Al-Jaish	3	0	0	3	2	9	-7	0

== Champion ==
Bani Yas International Tournament
2011 Winners
Al Nassr

== See also ==
Bani Yas International Tournament
