= 2013 Bani Yas International Tournament =

Tournament details
- Host country: United Arab Emirates
- Dates: 31 July – 4 August
- Teams: 4 (from 2 confederations)
- Venue: 1 (in 1 host city)

Final positions
- Champions: (Saudi Arabia) Al-Nassr (2nd title)
- Runners-up: (United Arab Emirates) Bani Yas
- Third place: (Kuwait) Al-Arabi
- Fourth place: (Oman) Dhofar

Tournament statistics
- Matches played: 4
- Goals scored: 9 (2.25 per match)

The Bani Yas International Tournament is a yearly football tournament that takes place in Abu Dhabi in the United Arab Emirates that began in 2010.

The champion of the 2013 edition was Al-Nassr.

== Participant teams ==
(Kuwait) Al-Arabi
(Saudi Arabia) Al-Nassr
(United Arab Emirates) Bani Yas
(Oman) Dhofar

== Fixtures ==
Wednesday 31 July 2013

(United Arab Emirates) Bani Yas	0 – 0	(Oman) Dhofar
	Report
Penalties
	3 - 2

Bani Yas Stadium
Thursday 1 Aug 2011

(Kuwait) Al-Arabi	1 – 3	(Saudi Arabia) Al-Nassr
Hussein Al-Musawi 71'	Report	Rafael Bastos 62' (pen.) Hassan Al-Raheb 72' Awad Khamees 78'

Bani Yas Stadium

=== Third-place match ===
Saturday 3 Aug 2011

(Kuwait) Al-Arabi	3 – 2	(Oman) Dhofar
	Report

Bani Yas Stadium

== Final ==
Sunday 4 Aug 2011

(United Arab Emirates) Bani Yas	0 – 1	(Saudi Arabia) Al-Nassr
	Report	Omar Hawsawi 65'

Bani Yas Stadium

== Champion ==
Bani Yas International Tournament
2013 Winners
Al-Nassr

== See also ==
Bani Yas International Tournament
