= 2025 Bani Yas International Tournament =

Tournament details
- Host country: United Arab Emirates
- Dates: 6 August – 10 August
- Teams: 3 (from 2 confederations)
- Venue: 1 (in 1 host city)

Final positions
- Champions: (United Arab Emirates) Al Wanda (1st title)

Tournament statistics
- Matches played: 3
- Goals scored: 7 (2.33 per match)

The Bani Yas International Tournament Makes its return with its 6th edition of the football tournament that takes place in Abu Dhabi in the United Arab Emirates.

== Participating clubs ==
| Club | Confederation | Previous appearances in tournament |
|---|---|---|
| (United Arab Emirates) Baniyas (host) | AFC | 6th |
| (Kuwait) Al-Arabi | AFC | 2nd |
| (United Arab Emirates) Al Wanda | AFC | 1st |

== Matches ==
| 6 August 2025 | Al-Arabi (Kuwait Football Association) | 0–1 | (United Arab Emirates Football Association) Baniyas | Abu Dhabi, United Arab Emirates |
| 18:30 AST | | | Suhail Al-Noubi 83' | Stadium: Baniyas Stadium; Referee: Mohammed Abdulla Hassan |

| 8 August 2025 | Al-Arabi (Kuwait Football Association) | 0–2 | (United Arab Emirates Football Association) Al-Wahda | Abu Dhabi, United Arab Emirates |
| 18:30 AST | | | Rivera 36', 85' | Stadium: Baniyas Stadium; Referee: Mohammed Abdulla Hassan |

| 10 August 2025 | Baniyas (United Arab Emirates Football Association) | 1–3 | (United Arab Emirates Football Association) Al-Wahda | Abu Dhabi, United Arab Emirates |
| 18:30 AST | | | Pimenta 3'; Ghorbani 60'; Lucas Vera 83' | Stadium: Baniyas Stadium; Referee: Mohammed Abdulla Hassan |

== Table ==
| Pos | Team | Pld | W | D | L | GF | GA | GD | Pts | Champions |
|---|---|---|---|---|---|---|---|---|---|---|
| 1 | (United Arab Emirates Football Association) Al-Wahda | 2 | 2 | 0 | 0 | 5 | 1 | +4 | 6 | Champions |
| 2 | (United Arab Emirates Football Association) Baniyas | 2 | 1 | 0 | 1 | 2 | 3 | −1 | 3 | |
| 3 | (Kuwait Football Association) Al-Arabi | 2 | 0 | 0 | 2 | 0 | 3 | −3 | 0 | |

== See also ==
Bani Yas International Tournament
