= Mohammad Musa (disambiguation) =

Mohammad Musa may refer to:

- Mohammad Musa, Bangladesh Navy officer
- Muhammad Musa, Pakistani cricketer
- Mohammed Musa, Qatari footballer
- Mohammed Musa (footballer, born 1990), Sudanese footballer
- Mohamed Musa Gadou, Sudanese sprinter
