= Bahaeddine Rihan =

Sudanese footballer

Baha Eldin Mohamed Abdallah
Personal information
- Full name: Baha Eldin Mohamed Abdallah Rihan
- Date of birth: 1 January 1979 (age 47)
- Place of birth: Sudan
- Height: 1.81 m (5 ft 11 1/2 in)
- Position: Goalkeeper

Team information
- Current team: Dabarousa SC (Halfa Al-Jadida)
- Number: 16

Senior career*
Years	Team	Apps	(Gls)
1998-1999	Al-Merrikh SC (Al-Hasahisa)		
2000-2007	Al-Merrikh SC		
2008-2009	Al Neel SC (Al-Hasahisa)		
2010-2011	Jazeerat Al-Feel SC		
2012-2013	Al-Hilal Club		
2014-2015	Al Ahli SC (Khartoum)		
2015-2016	Hay Al Wadi SC (Nyala)		
2017-2019	Wad Hashim SC (sennar)		
2019-2020	Al Rabita Kosti		
2020-2022	Haidoub SC (Al-Nuhud)		
2022–2022	Al Rabita Kosti		
2022-2023	Dabarousa SC (Halfa Al-Jadida)		

International career
2002-2012	Sudan	20	(0)
Medal record
Men's football
Representing Sudan
African Nations Championship
Third place	2011 Sudan
CECAFA Cup
Winner	2006 Ethiopia
Third place	2011 Tanzania
- * Club domestic league appearances and goals

Baha Edin Mohamed Abdallah Rihan (born 1 January 1979) is a Sudanese football goalkeeper who plays for Al Rabita Kosti and the Sudan national football team.

== Houners ==
Al-Merrikh SC

- Sudan Premier League: 2000, 2001, 2002
- Sudan Cup: 2001, 2005, 2006, 2007

'Al-Hilal Club

- Sudan Premier League: 2012

Sudan

- African Nations Championship: 3rd place, 2011
- CECAFA Cup: 2006; 3rd place, 2011
