= Jean-François Losciuto =

Belgian football coach and former player

Personal information
- Place of birth: Belgium
- Position: Defender

Youth career
- La Prévale

Senior career*
Years	Team	Apps	(Gls)
- Fexhe-Slins

Managerial career
- RFC Liège (youth)
- 20xx–2008: RRC Hamoir (U19)
- 2008–2010: RCS Verviérs
- 2010–2011: Royal Etoile FC Wegnez
- 2011–20xx: US Halthier
- 2014: Anges FC
- 2014: Rayon Sports F.C.
- 2014–2015: ASFA Yennenga
- 2015–2016: Nigeria (assistant)
- 2016–2017: Black Leopards F.C.
- 2017–2018: Richards Bay F.C.
- 2018–2019: Cano Sport
- 2019–2020: Futuro Kings
- * Club domestic league appearances and goals

Jean-François Losciuto is a Belgian football coach who presently manages Richards Bay of the South African National First Division as of 2017.

== Career ==
=== Togo ===
Becoming manager of 2013 Togolese champions Anges in early 2014, Losciuto targeted a second league title but missed out on the 2014 CAF Champions League, getting knocked out by Nigeria's Enyimba in the second leg despite being them 3–1 in the first leg before being replaced by a Ghanaian that March and becoming their technical director.

Comparing African football to the sport in Europe, the former footballer states that it is much less organized but they have youth training institutes which Europe does not have and has said that the league level in Togo is between the Belgian second and third divisions.

=== Rwanda ===
Picked to lead Rayon Sports of the Rwanda National Football League owing to his experience in 2014, the Belgian took Gikundiro to a quarter-final exit to APR at the 2014 Kagame Interclub Cup, going on to say that his squad lacked the potential to contend for silverware ahead of the season. Later, in September, he left the club and claimed it was to resolve family matters in Belgium, when he was actually installed as head coach of ASFA Yennega in Burkina Faso with Rayon Sports on the verge of reporting the incident to FIFA. Despite originally dismissing it as a rumor, he eventually ended up at ASFA.

=== Burkina Faso ===
Concluding a four-year deal with ASFA Yennenga of the Burkinabé Premier League in September 2014, the football director was discharged from his duties in 2015 but claimed that they still owed him money and had to take the case to court.

=== Nigeria ===
Assisting Sunday Oliseh at the Nigeria national team in 2015, Losciuto was compared to French tactician Claude Le Roy for his exploits in Africa. However, he had to undergo surgery to remove a small piece of metal from his stomach but became ill shortly after and went to Belgium to get help. Purportedly, the Nigeria Football Federation owed him five months' worth of salaries in 2016 but it is unknown whether it was actually paid or not.

=== South Africa ===
Taking over Black Leopards of the South African National First Division in 2016 and arriving on 11 November, Losciuto directed Lidoda Duvha from 13th place to the promotion playoffs but was not ostentatious about his achievements. In the end, they did not achieve promotion and he resigned in winter 2017, giving "unbearable working conditions" as his reason coupled with a poor start to the 2017-18 National First Division. Immediately, he was handed the coaching job for Richards Bay of the National First Division but was shown the door by April 2018 with three rounds left of the season.

=== Egypt ===
In 2018–2019, Jean-François appointed as assistant coach of Luc Eymale in elgeish Egyptian side. They led the team in 20 matches and achieved the club objective after won 6 matches and draw in 6 matches and lose in 5 matches.

=== Equatorial Guinea ===
In 2019–2020, Jean-François took charge of the Champions of Equatorial Guinea, Cano Sport. He led them in to eliminate Mekele FC the Ethiopian champions, then he was eliminated by the giant Al Ahly of Egypt.
