= Abdelrahman Isaac Karongo =

Sudanese footballer

Abdelrahman Kurongo
Personal information
- Full name: Abdelrahman Ishag Hasan Abaker
- Date of birth: 28 November 1988 (age 37)
- Place of birth: Sudan
- Height: 1.78 m (5 ft 10 in)
- Position: Right back

Team information
- Current team: Al-Ittihad SC (Wad Madani)
- Number: 15

Senior career*
Years	Team	Apps	(Gls)
2006–2007	Al-Omal SC (Wad Madani)		
2008–2010	Al-Ahli (Wad Medani)	45	(6)
2011	Al Khartoum SC	14	(3)
2012	Al-Merrikh SC	0	(0)
2012	Al Ahli SC (Khartoum)		
2013	Jazeerat Al-Feel SC		
2014–2015	Al-Merreikh SC (Al-Fasher)		
2016	Al-Merreikh SC (Nyala)		
2017–2020	El-Hilal SC El-Obeid		
2020–2021	Al-Merrikh SC		
2021–2022	Al Ahli SC (Khartoum)		
2022-2026	Al-Ahli SC (Wad Madani)		
2026-	Al-Ittihad SC (Wad Madani)		

International career^{‡}
2010–2017	Sudan	15	(0)
Medal record
Men's football
Representing Sudan
CECAFA Cup
Third place	2011 Tanzania
- * Club domestic league appearances and goals as of 16:26, 1 August 2026 (UTC) ‡ National team caps and goals as of 16:26, 20 January 2012 (UTC)

Abdelrahman Ishag Hasan Abaker (born 29 July 1985) is a Sudanese international footballer who plays for Al-Ahli SC (Wad Madani), as a right back. He is the younger brother of Hasan Karongo.

== Honours ==
Sudan

- CECAFA Cup: 3rd place, 2011
