= Mohamed Ahmed Bashir =

Sudanese footballer (born 1983)

Personal information
- Full name: Mohamed Ahmed Bashir Abdalla
- Date of birth: 22 July 1983 (age 43)
- Place of birth: Khartoum Bahri, Sudan
- Height: 1.87 m (6 ft 2 in)
- Position: Attacking midfielder

Senior career*
Years	Team	Apps	(Gls)
2003–2004	Al-Hurya SC (Omdurman)		
2005–2009	Al-Mourada SC		
2010–2019	Al-Hilal Club		(62)
2012–2013	→ Al-Wehda Club (Mecca) (loan)	12	(2)

International career
2007–2018	Sudan	47	(5)

Managerial career
- 2019: Al-Ahly Shendi (assistant)
- 2019: Sudan (assistant)
- 2020–2021: Al-Hilal Club (assistant)
- 2021–2021: Zambia (assistant)
- 2021–2022: Sudan (assistant)
- 2024-: Al-Sailiya SC (assistant)
Medal record
Men's football
Representing Sudan
African Nations Championship
Third place	2018 Morocco
Third place	2011 Sudan
CECAFA Cup
Third place	2011 Tanzania
- * Club domestic league appearances and goals

Mohamed Ahmed Bashir (born 22 July 1983), also known as Muhamed Besha, is a Sudanese football coach and former player. He played as an attacking midfielder .

== Career statistics ==
=== International ===
Appearances and goals by national team and year
National team	Year	Apps	Goals
Sudan	2007	2	0
Sudan	2008	–	
Sudan	2009	5	0
Sudan	2010	2	0
Sudan	2011	11	2
Sudan	2012	9	3
Sudan	2013	1	0
Sudan	2014	5	0
Sudan	2015	1	0
Sudan	2016	5	0
Sudan	2017	–	
Sudan	2018	7	0
Total		48	5

Scores and results list Sudan's goal tally first, score column indicates score after each Bashir goal.

List of international goals scored by Mohamed Ahmed Bashir
No.	Date	Venue	Opponent	Score	Result	Competition
1	27 March 2011	Al-Merrikh Stadium, Omdurman, Sudan	Swaziland	1–0	3–0	2012 Africa Cup of Nations qualification
2	27 March 2011	Al-Merrikh Stadium, Omdurman, Sudan	Swaziland	2–0	3–0	2012 Africa Cup of Nations qualification
3	26 January 2012	Estadio de Malabo, Malabo, Equatorial Guinea	Angola	1–1	2–2	2012 Africa Cup of Nations
4	26 January 2012	Estadio de Malabo, Malabo, Equatorial Guinea	Angola	2–2	2–2	2012 Africa Cup of Nations
5	8 September 2012	Al-Merrikh Stadium, Omdurman, Sudan	Ethiopia	2–1	5–3	2013 Africa Cup of Nations qualification

== Honours ==
Sudan

- African Nations Championship: 3rd place, 2018, 2011
- CECAFA Cup: 3rd place, 2011
