= Balla Jabir =

Sudanese footballer

Personal information
- Full name: Balla Jabir Kortokaila
- Date of birth: September 12, 1985 (age 41)
- Place of birth: Port Sudan, Red Sea State, Sudan
- Height: 1.72 m (5 ft 7 1/2 in)
- Position: Right back

Senior career*
Years	Team	Apps	(Gls)
2001-2005	Al-Merreikh Al-Thagher		
2006-2007	Hay Al-Arab SC		
2008-2016	Al-Merrikh SC		
2016	Al-Amir SC (Bahri)		
2017	Al Ahli SC (Khartoum)		
2018	Hay Al-Arab SC		
2019	Al Rabita Kosti		
2019-2020	Al-Ahli Club (Merowe)		
2020-2021	Tuti SC		

International career
2006-2017	Sudan	35	(0)
Medal record
Men's football
Representing Sudan
African Nations Championship
Third place	2011 Sudan
CECAFA Cup
Winner	2007 Tanzania
- * Club domestic league appearances and goals

Balla Gabir Kortokaila (born 12 September 1985, in Umm Dawm) is a Sudanese footballer, who currently plays for Sudanese side El-Merreikh.

== Career ==
He plays as a left back or a winger. He was brought from Hay al-Arab in December 2007 to El-Merreikh. The first goal he scored for the club was against Amal Atbara when his side won 3:0 in Omdurman. He is known for his speed, rough tackling and sliding tackling.

== International career ==
He is a member of the Sudan national football team.

== Honours ==
Sudan

- African Nations Championship: 3rd place, 2011
- CECAFA Cup: 2007
