= Bani Yas International Tournament =

- Founded: 2010; 16 years ago
- Country: United Arab Emirates
- Number of clubs: 3-4
- Current champions: (United Arab Emirates) Al Wahda (1st title)
- Most championships: (Saudi Arabia) Al-Nassr (2 titles)
- Current: 2025 Bani Yas international Tournament

The Bani Yas International Tournament is a yearly football tournament that takes place in Abu Dhabi in the United Arab Emirates. It was founded in 2010.

== Winners ==
Year	Champions
2010	(Sudan) Al-Hilal
2011	(Saudi Arabia) Al-Nassr
2012	Al Kuwait
2013	(Saudi Arabia) Al-Nassr
2014	(Oman) Dhofar
2025	(United Arab Emirates) Al Wahda

== See also ==
2010 Bani Yas International Tournament
