= Hussein Javu =

Tanzanian footballer

Personal information
- Date of birth: 10 August 1991 (age 35)
- Place of birth: Morogoro, Tanzania
- Height: 1.72 m (5 ft 8 in)
- Position: Forward

Team information
- Current team: Ndanda

Senior career*
Years	Team	Apps	(Gls)
2009–2010	JKT Ruvu Stars		
2010–2013	Mtibwa Sugar		
2013–2015	Young Africans		
2015–2018	Mtibwa Sugar		
2019	Alliance Academy		
2019–	Ndanda		

International career^{‡}
2011–2012	Tanzania	5	(1)
- * Club domestic league appearances and goals as of 22 April 2021 ‡ National team caps and goals as of 22 April 2021

Hussein Javu (born 10 August 1991) is a Tanzanian football striker who plays for Ndanda. He was a squad member at the 2011 CECAFA Cup.
