= Al-Nesoor SC =

Sudanese football club

- Full name: Al-Nesoor Sports Club
- Ground: Khartoum Stadium; Omdurman Capital, Sudan
- Capacity: 23,000
- League: Sudan Premier League
- 2011: 8th

Al-Nesoor Sports Club (Arabic: نادي النسور الرياضي) is a Sudanese football club based in Omdurman Capital. They play in the top division in Sudanese football, Sudan Premier League. Their home stadium is Khartoum Stadium.

== National ==
- Sudan Premier League

Champion (0):
Runners-up (0):
Third Place (0):
Fourth Place (0):
8 Place (1):2011
18 Place (1):2016

- Sudan Cup

Champion (0):
Runners-up (0):
Semi-finals (0):
Quarter-Finals (1):2016
Round 16 (0):
Round 32 (0):
Preliminary Round (0):

- Khartoum League

Champion (0):
Runners-up(0):

== Current squad ==
Note: Flags indicate national team as defined under FIFA eligibility rules; some limited exceptions apply. Players may hold more than one non-FIFA nationality.

No.	Pos.	Nation	Player
-	DF	SDN	Mohammed Sulaiman
-	DF	SDN	Amjed
-	DF	SDN	Ashoul
-	MF	SDN	Mohammed Musa
-	MF	SDN	Omer Taban
-	MF	SDN	Mohamed Zakaria
-	MF	SDN	Atif

No.	Pos.	Nation	Player
-	FW	GHA	Dominic
-	FW	SDN	Kwaliba
-	FW	SDN	Fadlallah Adam
-	FW	NGR	Steven Damali
-	FW	SDN	Amir Mousa
-	FW	SDN	Mohammed Musa
-	FW	NGR	Samual
