= Brian Majwega =

Ugandan footballer

Personal information
- Place of birth: Uganda
- Position: Midfielder

Team information
- Current team: KASUKALI AD FC

Brian Majwega is a Ugandan professional footballer, who plays as a midfielder for KCCA FC.

== International career ==
In January 2014, coach Milutin Sedrojevic, invited him to be included in the Uganda national football team for the 2014 African Nations Championship. The team placed third in the group stage of the competition after beating Burkina Faso, drawing with Zimbabwe and losing to Morocco.
