= Pascal Ochieng =

Kenyan footballer (born 1986)

Personal information
- Full name: Pascal Ochieng
- Date of birth: 15 May 1986 (age 40)
- Place of birth: Mathare, Kenya
- Position: Centre back

Team information
- Current team: Simba

Senior career*
Years	Team	Apps	(Gls)
2000–2001	Mathare United		
2001–2002	Mazarea Dina		
2003–2004	World Hope FC		
2004–2005	Re-Union Nairobi		
2005	Young Africans S.C.		
2005–2006	Brabrand IF		
2006–2008	Young Africans S.C.		
2008–2009	Kenya Commercial Bank FC		
2010	Posta Rangers F.C.		
2012	Johor FC		
2013	Simba		

International career
2001–2012	Kenya	26	(3)
- * Club domestic league appearances and goals

Pascal Ochieng (born 15 May 1986 in Kenya) is a Kenyan international footballer, currently playing for Simba.

Pascal Ochieng had a short stint at Gor Mahia FC in 2005 and AFC Leopards 2011 mid season before joining Simba in 2012. He plays for Posta Rangers and is captain of the Division one team that the chance to join the KPL league after drawing 2–2 with promoted KRA before losing 6–5 on penalty shoot outs. Ochieng converted the first for his team.

On 13 August, Simba have settled for a signature of Kenya's Harambee Stars Vice captain and defender Pascal Ochieng.

== International career ==
=== International goals ===
Scores and results list Kenya's goal tally first.

No	Date	Venue	Opponent	Score	Result	Competition
1.	26 August 2009	Bahrain National Stadium, Manama, Bahrain	Bahrain	1–1	1–2	Friendly
2.	11 November 2011	Stade Linité, Victoria, Seychelles	Seychelles	1–0	3–0	2014 FIFA World Cup qualification
3.	30 November 2011	National Stadium, Dar es Salaam, Tanzania	Ethiopia	2–0	2–0	2011 CECAFA Cup
