= Eric Masika =

Kenyan professional footballer

Eric Chemiati Masika (born 2 June 1985) is a retired Kenyan footballer who turned out for two famous Kenyan Premier League clubs Gor Mahia F.C. and A.F.C. Leopards between 2009 and 2016 and Kenya as defender. Masika's protracted move from Gor Mahia to Leopards in late 2011 made headline news.

== Career ==
In 2015 he had a stint at another Kenyan club KRA then later signed for Sofapaka for 'two weeks' in June 2015 before returning to Leopards. He later sampled Ugandan football by joining Express.

Masika later acquired his coaching badges in 2021 and went on to coach lower-tier side Kona Rangers.
