= Ali Kimera =

Ugandan footballer (born 1991)

Personal information
- Date of birth: 4 July 1991 (age 35)
- Place of birth: Uganda
- Position: Goalkeeper

Team information
- Current team: Busoga United

Ali Kimera (born on 7 April 1991) is a Ugandan professional footballer who plays as a goalkeeper for Busoga United FC.

== International career ==
In January 2014, coach Milutin Sedrojevic, invited him to be included in the Uganda national football team for the 2014 African Nations Championship. The team placed third in the group stage of the competition after beating Burkina Faso, drawing with Zimbabwe and losing to Morocco.
