= Ramadhan Chombo =

Tanzanian footballer

Personal information
- Full name: Ramadhan Seleman Chombo
- Date of birth: 9 December 1987 (age 38)
- Place of birth: Tanga, Tanzania
- Height: 1.74 m (5 ft 9 in)
- Position: Midfielder

Team information
- Current team: Biashara United

Senior career*
Years	Team	Apps	(Gls)
–2010	Simba		
2010–2012	Azam		
2012–2014	Simba		
2014–2016	Villa Squad		
2016–2017	Mbeya City		
2017–2018	Friends Rangers		
2018–2019	African Lyon		
2019–	Biashara United		

International career^{‡}
2011	Tanzania	8	(0)
- * Club domestic league appearances and goals as of 1 August 2020 ‡ National team caps and goals as of 1 August 2020

Ramadhan Chombo (born 9 December 1987) is a Tanzanian football midfielder who plays for Biashara United.
