= Mossi Moussa =

Burundian footballer

Personal information
- Full name: Mossi Hadji Moussa
- Date of birth: 15 September 1992 (age 34)
- Position: Midfielder

Team information
- Current team: Le Messager FC

Mossi Moussa is a Burundian professional footballer, who plays as a midfielder for Le Messager FC in the Burundi Football League.

== International career ==
He was invited by Lofty Naseem, the national team coach, to represent Burundi in the 2014 African Nations Championship, held in South Africa.
