= Tom Masiko =

Ugandan footballer (born 1996)

Personal information
- Date of birth: 17 February 1996 (age 30)
- Position: Forward

Team information
- Current team: Wakiso Giants

Senior career*
Years	Team	Apps	(Gls)
2011–2017	KCCA FC		
2017–2019	Vipers		
2019–	Wakiso Giants		

International career^{‡}
2013–	Uganda	7	(0)
- * Club domestic league appearances and goals as of 15:50, 26 December 2019 (UTC) ‡ National team caps and goals as of 15:23, 9 March 2018 (UTC)

Tom Masiko (born 17 February 1996) is an Ugandan international footballer who plays for Wakiso Giants, as a forward.

== Career ==
He has played club football for Kampala Capital City Authority, Vipers and Wakiso Giants.

He made his international debut for Uganda in 2013.
