= Jean-Claude Iranzi =

Rwandan footballer (born 1990)

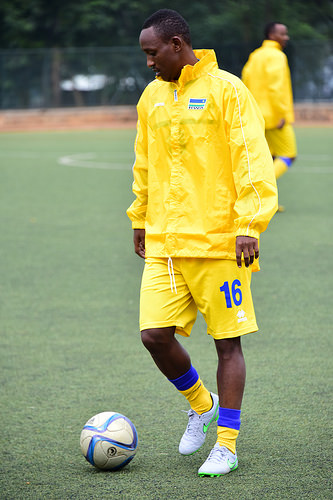
- Iranzi in Rwanda training in 2016

Personal information
- Date of birth: 5 October 1990 (age 36)
- Place of birth: Kigali, Rwanda
- Height: 1.81 m (5 ft 11 in)
- Position: Midfielder

Youth career
- 2004–2005: Kiyovu Sport

Senior career*
Years	Team	Apps	(Gls)
2006–2008	Kiyovu Sport	36	(2)
2009–2016	APR		
2016–2017	Topvar Topoľčany	26	(6)
2017–2018	ZESCO United		
2018–2019	APR		
2019–2022	Rayon Sports		
2020	→ Aswan (loan)	0	(0)

International career
2007–2010	Rwanda U-20	11	(0)
2008–2019	Rwanda	64	(3)
- * Club domestic league appearances and goals

Jean-Claude Iranzi (born 5 October 1990) is a former Rwandan professional footballer who last played for Rwanda Premier League club Rayon Sports.

== Club career ==
=== Kiyovu Sport ===
Iranzi was born in Kigali. He began his career in 2004 with SC Kiyovu Sport and was promoted in the 2006 Rwandan Premier League team. He made his debut for Kiyovu Sport in June 2006.

=== APR FC ===
In December 2008, Iranzi signed with APR FC, the previous winners of the Rwandan Premier League. He made his APR FC debut in an organised friendly match against fellow league members Police FC. With APR, Iranzi won the 2009–10 Rwandan Premier League, thus earning a spot in the 2011 CAF Champions League, where APR was eliminated in the Preliminary round to Club Africain of Tunisia on an aggregate score of 2–6. APR repeated as Premier League champions in 2010–11, and therefore played in the 2012 CAF Champions League.

== International career ==
Iranzi played the African U-20 Youth Championship in Rwanda. He played his debut for the "Wasps" on 21 June 2008 in the 2010 FIFA World Cup qualification match against Morocco national football team. Iranzi's first international goal came on 26 March 2011 as part of Rwanda's 2012 Africa Cup of Nations qualification campaign. The goal, scored in the 44th minute, gave Rwanda a 1–0 lead over regional rival Burundi. Rwanda went on to win the match 3–1.

== Career statistics ==
Appearances and goals by national team and year
National team	Year	Apps	Goals
Rwanda	2009	1	0
Rwanda	2010	3	0
Rwanda	2010	5	0
Rwanda	2011	8	3
Rwanda	2012	9	0
Rwanda	2013	8	0
Rwanda	2014	4	0
Rwanda	2015	11	0
Rwanda	2016	8	0
Rwanda	2017	1	0
Rwanda	2018	3	0
Rwanda	2019	3	0
Total		64	3

Scores and results list Rwanda's goal tally first, score column indicates score after each Iranzi goal.

List of international goals scored by Jean-Claude Iranzi
No.	Date	Venue	Opponent	Score	Result	Competition
1	26 March 2011	Stade Régional Nyamirambo, Kigali, Rwanda	Burundi	1–0	3–1	2012 Africa Cup of Nations qualification
2	15 November 2011	Amahoro Stadium, Kigali, Rwanda	Eritrea	2–0	3–1	2014 FIFA World Cup qualification
3	8 December 2011	National Stadium, Dar es Salaam, Tanzania	Sudan	1–0	2–1	2011 CECAFA Cup

== Honours ==
APR FC

- Rwandan Premier League: 2009–10, 2010–11
- Rwandan Cup: 2010
