= Didier Kavumbagu =

Burundian footballer

Didier Kavumbangu
Personal information
- Full name: Didier Kavumbangu
- Date of birth: 2 May 1988 (age 38)
- Place of birth: Bujumbura, Burundi
- Position: Striker

Team information
- Current team: Kwik Eine
- Number: 11

Youth career
- 2009–2010: Lydia Ludic Burundi Académic

Senior career*
Years	Team	Apps	(Gls)
2009–2012	Atlético Olympic		
2012–2014	Young Africans		
2014–2016	Azam FC		
2016–2017	EEPCO		
2017–2018	Viktoria Otrokovice		
2018–2020	KVC Nokere-Kruishoutem (Belgium)		
2020–	Kwik Eine (Belgium)		

International career
2004–	Burundi	9	(2)
Medal record
Men's football
Representing Burundi
CECAFA Cup
Runner-up	2004 Ethiopia
- * Club domestic league appearances and goals as of 9 November 2017

Didier Kavumbangu (born 2 May 1988) is a Burundian professional international footballer. He plays for Viktoria Otrokovice which playing in the MSFL as a striker.

Young Africans yesterday unveiled Burundian striker, Didier Kavumbangu who has joined the Jangwani-based club for the coming season.

He was called to Burundi national football team at the 2012 Africa Cup of Nations qualification and scored two goals for his team.

== Honours ==
Burundi

- CECAFA Cup: Runner-up, 2004
