= Najm Eldin Abdullah =

Sudanese defender

Najm Eldin Abdallah Abdeljabar
Personal information
- Date of birth: 17 November 1987 (age 38)
- Place of birth: Sudan
- Height: 1.76 m (5 ft 9 1/2 in)
- Position: Defender

Senior career*
Years	Team	Apps	(Gls)
2007-2009	Al Khartoum SC		
2010-2013	Al-Merrikh SC		
2013-2017	Khartoum NC		
2018-2019	El-Hilal SC El-Obeid		
2019-2020	Hay Al-Arab SC		
2020-2021	Tuti SC		

International career
2010-	Sudan	12	(0)
Medal record
Men's football
Representing Sudan
African Nations Championship
Third place	2011 Sudan
CECAFA Cup
Third place	2011 Tanzania
- * Club domestic league appearances and goals

Najm Eldin Abdullah (born 17 November 1987), also known as Najm Eldin Abdallah Abdeljabar, is a Sudanese defender who played for Al-Merreikh in the Sudan Premier League. He is a member of the Sudan national football team. He was brought from Khartoum-3 in December 2009 to Al-Merreikh. He plays as a center back.

== Honours ==
Sudan

- African Nations Championship: 3rd place, 2011
- CECAFA Cup: 3rd place, 2011
