= Abouba Sibomana =

Rwandan footballer

Personal information
- Full name: Abouba Sibomana
- Date of birth: January 24, 1989 (age 37)
- Place of birth: Butare, Rwanda
- Height: 1.89 m (6 ft 2 in)
- Position: Defender

Team information
- Current team: Gor Mahia FC
- Number: 3

Senior career*
Years	Team	Apps	(Gls)
–2009	Rayon Sports F.C.		(0)
2009–	Gor Mahia FC		

International career
2009–	Rwanda	26	(0)
- * Club domestic league appearances and goals

Abouba Sibomana (born 24 January 1989) is a Rwandan footballer who currently plays for Gor Mahia FC in the Kenyan Premier League as a defender.
