= Serge Wawa =

Ivorian footballer

Personal information
- Full name: Serges Pascal Wawa Sfondo
- Date of birth: 1 January 1986 (age 40)
- Place of birth: Bingerville, Ivory Coast
- Height: 1.80 m (5 ft 11 in)
- Positions: Defender; defensive midfielder

Team information
- Current team: Simba SC
- Number: 6

Youth career
- Académie de Sol Beni

Senior career*
Years	Team	Apps	(Gls)
2003–2010	ASEC Mimosas		
2010–2014	Al-Merrikh		
2014–2016	Azam F.C.		
2016–2017	Al-Merrikh		
2017–2022	Simba SC		
2022-	Singida Fountain Gate		

International career
2008	Ivory Coast U23	4	(0)
- * Club domestic league appearances and goals as of 9 September 2016

Serges Pascal Wawa Sfondo (born 1 January 1986 in Bingerville) is an Ivorian footballer who currently plays as a defender for Singida Fountain Gate FC in the Tanzanian Premier League.

== Career ==
He began his career in 2003 at ASEC Mimosas. On 19 January 2009, he was on trial at FC Lorient. In December 2010, he joined the Sudanese club, Al-Merrikh, on a 3-year deal. In November 2014, he signed with Azam F.C., a football club in Tanzanian Premier League.

== International career ==
He represented his country at the 2008 Olympic Games and played 4 games. He played in the Toulon Tournament of 2008 for the Ivory Coast U23.
