= Hamad Ndikumana =

Rwandan footballer

Personal information
- Full name: Hamad Ndikumana
- Date of birth: 5 October 1978
- Place of birth: Bujumbura, Burundi
- Date of death: 15 November 2017 (aged 39)
- Place of death: Kigali, Rwanda
- Height: 1.81 m (5 ft 11 in)
- Positions: Left back; right back

Senior career*
Years	Team	Apps	(Gls)
1998–1999	Rayon Sport	?	(?)
2000–2001	KV Turnhout	?	(?)
2001–2002	RSC Anderlecht	0	(0)
2002–2003	KV Mechelen	14	(0)
2003–2005	KAA Gent	39	(3)
2005–2006	APOP Kinyras Peyias FC	23	(3)
2006–2007	Nea Salamina	12	(1)
2007–2008	Anorthosis Famagusta FC	22	(0)
2008–2009	AC Omonia	21	(1)
2009–2010	AEL Limassol	36	(0)
2011	APOP Kinyras Peyias FC	6	(0)
Total		173	(8)

International career
1998–2011	Rwanda	51	(0)
- * Club domestic league appearances and goals

Hamad Ndikumana (5 October 1978 – 15 November 2017) also known as Katauti by the Rwandan fans, was a Rwandan football defender who was released from APOP Kinyras Peyias FC in Cyprus. His main attribute was his excellent tackling. He died on 15 November 2017.

== Career ==
He played also for Anorthosis, KV Mechelen, APOP Kinyras Peyias, Nea Salamina and KAA Gent. After several rows with Temuri Ketsbaia broke his contract with Anorthosis and signed for AC Omonia. On July 18 he signed a contract with AEL Limassol.

== International career ==
He helped Rwanda reach the African Cup of Nations 2004 for the first time in its history.
