= Hervé Rugwiro =

Rwandan footballer

Personal information
- Date of birth: 21 December 1992 (age 33)
- Position: Defender

Team information
- Current team: RAYON SPORT
- Number: 4

Senior career*
Years	Team	Apps	(Gls)
2013–	APR FC		

International career^{‡}
2016–	Rwanda	2	(0)
- * Club domestic league appearances and goals ‡ National team caps and goals as of 5 November 2019

Hervé Rugwiro (born 21 December 1992) is a Rwandan football defender for APR FC.
