= Mohamed Traoré (footballer, born 1988) =

Malian footballer

Personal information
- Date of birth: 18 November 1988 (age 37)
- Place of birth: Bamako, Mali
- Height: 1.83 m (6 ft 0 in)
- Position: Forward

Youth career
- 2007–2008: Real Bamako

Senior career*
Years	Team	Apps	(Gls)
2008–2009	Real Bamako		
2009–2011	Club Africain	?	(6)
2011	→ Al-Nasr Benghazi (loan)	17	(12)
2011	Sion	0	(0)
2012	Ismaily	1	(0)
2013	Al-Hilal Omdurman		
2014–2016	Al-Merrikh		
2017	Real Bamako		

International career
2010–2015	Mali	5	(1)
- * Club domestic league appearances and goals

Mohamed Traoré (born 18 November 1988) is a Malian former professional footballer who played as a forward.

== Career ==
In January 2011 it was announced Traoré would join Swiss Super League side FC Sion from Tunisian club Club Africain for the 2011–12 season. Traoré agreed a four-year contract until June 2015.

== Personal life ==
Traoré was nicknamed "Zorro de Bamako" by Tunisian newspaper "Tunis Hebdo".
