= Honest Moyo =

Zimbabwean footballer (born 1991)

Personal information
- Date of birth: 29 October 1991 (age 35)
- Place of birth: Zimbabwe
- Position: Defender

Team information
- Current team: TS Sporting
- Number: 47

Senior career*
Years	Team	Apps	(Gls)
2011–2019	Highlanders	?	(?)
2019–	TS Sporting	15	(0)

International career^{‡}
2017–	Zimbabwe	5	(0)
- * Club domestic league appearances and goals as of 22 July 2020 ‡ National team caps and goals as of 17 March 2019

Honest Moyo (born 29 October 1991) is a Zimbabwe Bulawayoan footballer who plays as a defender for TS Sporting and the Zimbabwean national football team.

== Career ==
In March 2019, Moyo joined TS Sporting in South Africa.
