= Al Rabita Kosti =

Sudanese football club

Al-Rabita Kosti
- Full name: Al-Rabita Sports Club
- Founded: 1947
- Ground: Kosti Stadium, Kosti (city), White Nile State, Sudan
- Capacity: 3,000
- Chairman: Yousef Abdelghafour
- Manager: Ibrahim Abujameel
- League: Sudan Premier League

Al-Rabita Sports Club (Arabic: نادي الرابطة الرياضي) also known as Al-Rabita Kosti is a Sudanese football club based in Kosti. They play in the second division in Sudanese football, Sudan Second Division.

== National ==
- Kosti League

Champion ( ):
