= Mohammed Musa (footballer, born 1990) =

Sudanese footballer

Mohamed Musa
Personal information
- Full name: Mohamed Musa Mohamed Abdallah
- Date of birth: August 7, 1990 (age 36)
- Place of birth: Sudan
- Height: 1.80 m (5 ft 11 in)
- Position: Midfielder

Senior career*
Years	Team	Apps	(Gls)
2007-2013	Al-Nesoor SC		
2014-2015	Al-Merreikh SC (Al-Fasher)		
2015-2016	Al-Mourada SC		

International career
2011-2012	Sudan	8	(2)
Medal record
Men's football
Representing Sudan
CECAFA Cup
Third place	2011 Tanzania
- * Club domestic league appearances and goals

Mohamed Musa is a Sudanese footballer who plays for Al-Nsoor in the Sudan Premier League. He is a member of the Sudan National Football Team.

== Honours ==
Sudan

- CECAFA Cup: 3rd place, 2011
