= Khalefa Ahmed Mohamed =

Sudanese footballer

Khalefa Ahmed
Personal information
- Full name: Khalefa Ahmed Mohamed
- Date of birth: November 23, 1983 (age 42)
- Place of birth: Khartoum, Khartoum State, Sudan
- Height: 1.75 m (5 ft 9 in)
- Position: Right back

Senior career*
Years	Team	Apps	(Gls)
2005–2009	Al-Mourada SC		
2010–2014	Al-Hilal Club		
2015–2017	Al Ahli SC (Khartoum)		
2018	Al-Ahli SC (Merawe)		
2018–2021	Al-Merreikh SC (Al-Fasher)		
2021-2022	Al-Nahda SC Rabak		

International career
2010–2012	Sudan	19	(0)
Medal record
Men's football
Representing Sudan
African Nations Championship
Third place	2011 Sudan
CECAFA Cup
Third place	2011 Tanzania
- * Club domestic league appearances and goals

Khalefa Ahmed Mohamed is a Sudanese defender playing for the Sudanese club Al-Hilal Omdurman in the Sudan Premier League. He is also a member of the Sudan national football team. He was brought from Ahli Madani in June 2009 on a free transfer. He scored his first goal for Al-Hilal in the Bani Yas International Tournament against the Emirates club Bani Yas when he scored in the last minute of stoppage time, after that Al-Hilal won penalty shootout.

== Honours ==
Sudan

- African Nations Championship: 3rd place, 2011
- CECAFA Cup: 3rd place, 2011
