= Fuadi Ndayisenga =

Burundian footballer (born 1989)

Personal information
- Full name: Fuad Ndayisenga
- Date of birth: 15 June 1989 (age 37)
- Place of birth: Bujumbura, Burundi
- Position: Midfielder

Team information
- Current team: Sofapaka

Youth career
- 2003–2005: Vital'O F.C.

Senior career*
Years	Team	Apps	(Gls)
2006–2007	Vital'O	29	(7)
2008–2009	A.P.R.	14	(5)
2009–2011	Kiyovu Sports	7	(0)
2011–2015	Rayon Sports		
2015–	Sofapaka		

International career^{‡}
2008–	Burundi	26	(0)
- * Club domestic league appearances and goals as of 24 June 2015 ‡ National team caps and goals as of 25 March 2015

Fuadi Ndayisenga (born 15 June 1989 in Bujumbura) is a Burundian footballer who currently plays for Sofapaka in the Kenyan Premier League and the Burundi national team as a midfielder.

== Club career ==
On 24 June 2015, it was announced that Ndayisenga joined Kenyan side Sofapaka, after spending ten years in Burundi and Rwanda with Vital'O, A.P.R., Kiyovu Sports and Rayon Sports. On 27 June 2015, he made his debut for the club in 1–0 league win over Western Stima, playing 82 minutes before being substituted by Erastus Mwaniki at the Kenyatta Stadium in Machakos.

== International career ==
Ndayisenga made his debut for the Burundi national team on 1 June 2008 against Seychelles.
