= Said Maulid =

Tanzanian-Congolese footballer

Personal information
- Full name: Said Maulidi Kalukula
- Date of birth: September 3, 1984 (age 42)
- Place of birth: Namageni, Tanzania
- Height: 1.56 m (5 ft 1 in)
- Position: Striker

Youth career
- 1995–2000: Simba SC

Senior career*
Years	Team	Apps	(Gls)
2001–2007	Young Africans FC	196	(50)
2008–2012	Onze Bravos	52	(32)

International career
2000–2007	Tanzania	14	(0)
- * Club domestic league appearances and goals as of December 29, 2007

Said Maulidi Kalukula (born 3 September 1984 in Namageni, Tanzania) is a Tanzanian-Congolese football striker.

== Career ==
Kalukula began 1995 his career with Simba SC and signed 2001 for League rival Young Africans FC. after 196 games and 50 goals for Yanga FC signed in January 2008 for Angolan club Futebol Clube Onze Bravos do Maquis.

=== Attributes ===
Kalukula is a player with pace and ball controlling ability, when playing, he is very threat to the opponents.

== International career ==
He is a member of the Tanzania national football team.

== Personal life ==
Kalukula immigrated 2002 to the Republic of the Congo and lost his nationality in 2004 he obtained the Tanzanian passport.
