= Jérôme Sina =

Rwandan footballer

Personal information
- Date of birth: 18 February 1989 (age 37)
- Place of birth: Uvira, Zaïre
- Height: 1.65 m (5 ft 5 in)
- Position: Midfielder

Team information
- Current team: Bugesera

Senior career*
Years	Team	Apps	(Gls)
2009–2013	Rayon Sports		
2013	FC Saint-Éloi		
2013–2014	Police		
2014–2016	Rayon Sports		
2016	Villa		
2017	Addis Ababa City		
2017–2018	DC Motema Pembe		
2018–2019	Vital'O		
2019	Namungo		
2019–	Bugesera		

International career^{‡}
2010–2014	Rwanda	12	(0)
- * Club domestic league appearances and goals as of 1 August 2020 ‡ National team caps and goals as of 1 August 2020

Jérôme Sina (born 18 February 1989) is a Zaïre-born, Rwandan football midfielder who plays for Bugesera.
