= Baniyas Stadium =

Stadium in the Bani Yas area of Abu Dhabi, United Arab Emirates

Bani Yas Stadium
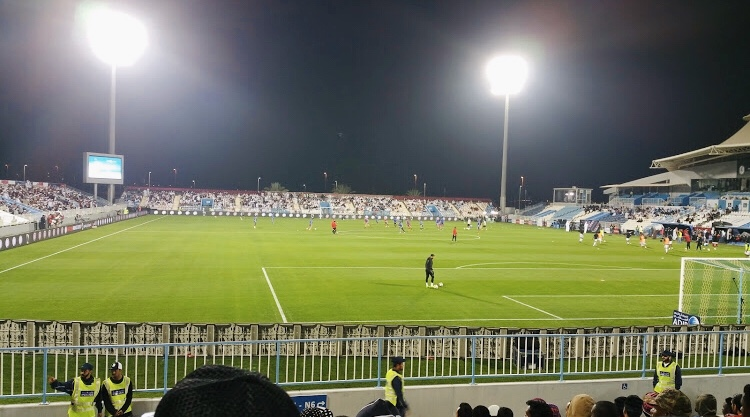
- Interactive map of Bani Yas Stadium
- Full name: Bani Yas Stadium
- Location: Abu Dhabi, United Arab Emirates
- Coordinates: 24.34986°N 54.68571°E
- Capacity: 6,927
- Surface: Grass

Construction
- Groundbreaking: 2009; 17 years ago
- Built: 2025; 1 year ago
- Opened: 2010; 16 years ago
- Renovated: 2026; 0 years ago

Tenant
- Baniyas SC

Baniyas Stadium is a stadium in the Bani Yas area of Abu Dhabi, United Arab Emirates.

It is the home stadium of Baniyas Club of the UAE Pro-League. The stadium holds 6,927 spectators.

== History ==
Construction of the stadium began on August 4, 2009 and was completed in February 2010. Baniyas Stadium was designed by the architect Roger Taillibert.
