= 2011 CECAFA Cup =

CECAFA Tusker Challenge Cup 2011

Tournament details
- Host country: Tanzania
- Dates: 25 November – 10 December
- Teams: 12 (from 1 confederation)
- Venues: 2 (in 1 host city)

Final positions
- Champions: Uganda (12th title)
- Runners-up: Rwanda
- Third place: Sudan
- Fourth place: Tanzania

Tournament statistics
- Matches played: 26
- Goals scored: 62 (2.38 per match)
- Top scorer(s): (Rwanda) Meddie Kagere (Rwanda) Olivier Karekezi (Uganda) Emmanuel Okwi (5 goals each)
- Best player: (Rwanda) Haruna Niyonzima

The 2011 CECAFA Cup was an international football competition consisting of East and Central African national teams. It was the 35th edition of the annual CECAFA Cup. The tournament was hosted by Tanzania for the second consecutive year and seventh time overall.

The tournament received Sh823 million (approximately $450,000) sponsorship from Serengeti Breweries Limited which covered the fees of the tournament such as the air tickets of all delegates, accommodations and prize money to name a few. The competition was therefore known as the CECAFA Tusker Challenge Cup 2011.

== Participants ==
- Burundi
- Djibouti
- Ethiopia
- Kenya
- Malawi (invitees)
- Rwanda
- Somalia
- Sudan
- Tanzania
- Uganda
- Zanzibar
- Zimbabwe (invitees)

The Council for East and Central Africa Football Associations (CECAFA) General Secretary Nicholas Musonye said that over 10 football associations applied to play as a guest team in the tournament. Out of all the applicants, the final shortlist was trimmed to four; Côte d'Ivoire, Malawi, South Africa and Zambia. However the Confederation of African Football (CAF) stated that Côte d'Ivoire and Zambia were not eligible to play in the competition as they had qualified for the 2012 Africa Cup of Nations. Teams are not able to compete in another competition within a two-month period of the Africa Cup of Nations.

The invitation was eventually extended to Malawi. However, it was then reported that they withdrew, citing financial constraints and lack of preparation time due to the late invitation. Zimbabwe had then been invited to replace them but the Malawian government told the Football Association of Malawi to reconsider their participation in the tournament as they along with CECAFA will shoulder their expenses.

Eritrea were initially scheduled to participate but withdrew due to lack of funds and were replaced with Namibia. It was suggested by some media outlets that Eritrean authorities were mindful of players attempting to seek political asylum whilst in Tanzania. Namibia eventually turned down the invitation, stating that it would disrupt the Namibia Premier League schedule. They were replaced by Zimbabwe.

== Group stage ==
All times are East Africa Time (EAT) – UTC+3

Key to colours in group tables
Group winners, runners-up and two best third-placed teams advanced to the quarter-finals

=== Group A ===
Team	Pld	W	D	L	GF	GA	GD	Pts
Rwanda	3	3	0	0	8	2	+6	9
Zimbabwe	3	2	0	1	4	3	+1	6
Tanzania	3	1	0	2	4	3	+1	3
Djibouti	3	0	0	3	2	10	−8	0

26 November 2011
16:00

Tanzania	0–1	Rwanda
	Report	Karekezi 22'

Benjamin Mkapa National Stadium, Dar es Salaam
Referee: Bamlak Tessema Weyesa (Ethiopia)
27 November 2011
14:00

Zimbabwe	2–0	Djibouti
Ngoma 9'; Amini 73'	Report

Benjamin Mkapa National Stadium, Dar es Salaam

29 November 2011
14:00

Rwanda	2–0	Zimbabwe
Kagere 24', 82'	Report

Benjamin Mkapa National Stadium, Dar es Salaam
Referee: Davies Ogenche Omweno (Kenya)
29 November 2011
16:00

Tanzania	3–0	Djibouti
Ulimwengu 2'; Kazimoto 37'; Rashid 85'	Report

Benjamin Mkapa National Stadium, Dar es Salaam

2 December 2011
14:00

Rwanda	5–2	Djibouti
Bokota 3'; Mugiraneza 57'; Karekezi 78', 80', 86'	Report	Daoud 25', 34'

Benjamin Mkapa National Stadium, Dar es Salaam
Referee: Wiish Yabarow (Somalia)
3 December 2011
16:00

Tanzania	1–2	Zimbabwe
Kazimoto 88'	Report	Ngoma 1'; Maulid 11' (o.g.)

Benjamin Mkapa National Stadium, Dar es Salaam
Referee: Davies Ogenche Omweno (Kenya)

=== Group B ===
Team	Pld	W	D	L	GF	GA	GD	Pts
Burundi	3	2	1	0	5	1	+4	7
Uganda	3	2	0	1	6	2	+4	6
Zanzibar	3	1	1	1	4	2	+2	4
Somalia	3	0	0	3	1	11	−10	0

25 November 2011
14:00

Burundi	4–1	Somalia
Ndayisaba 30'; Papy 45'; Amissi 54'; Ndayisenga 86'	Report	Ali 90+2' (pen.)

Benjamin Mkapa National Stadium, Dar es Salaam
25 November 2011
16:00

Uganda	2–1	Zanzibar
Wagaluka 40'; Sserumaga 77'	Report	Ali 47'

Benjamin Mkapa National Stadium, Dar es Salaam
Referee: Davies Ogenche Omweno (Kenya)

27 November 2011
16:00

Zanzibar	0–0	Burundi
	Report

Benjamin Mkapa National Stadium, Dar es Salaam
28 November 2011
16:00

Somalia	0–4	Uganda
	Report	Wagaluka 48'; Okwi 61', 76', 90'

Chamazi Stadium, Chamazi

1 December 2011
14:00

Somalia	0–3	Zanzibar
	Report	Selemba 8'; Omar 51'; Morris 87'

Benjamin Mkapa National Stadium, Dar es Salaam
Referee: Hudu Munyemana (Rwanda)
1 December 2011
16:00

Burundi	1–0	Uganda
Amissi 40'	Report

Benjamin Mkapa National Stadium, Dar es Salaam
Referee: Bamlak Tessema Weyesa (Ethiopia)

=== Group C ===
Team	Pld	W	D	L	GF	GA	GD	Pts
Malawi	3	1	2	0	3	1	+2	5
Sudan	3	1	2	0	2	1	+1	5
Kenya	3	1	0	2	2	3	−1	3
Ethiopia	3	0	2	1	2	4	−2	2

28 November 2011
14:00

Sudan	1–1	Ethiopia
Muhannad 8'	Report	Kebede 34'

Benjamin Mkapa National Stadium, Dar es Salaam
Referee: Eric Gasinzigwa (Burundi)
28 November 2011
16:00

Kenya	0–2	Malawi
	Report	Banda 23'; Kamwendo 66' (pen.)

Benjamin Mkapa National Stadium, Dar es Salaam
Referee: Wiish Yabarow (Somalia)

30 November 2011
14:00

Ethiopia	0–2	Kenya
	Report	Mugalia 13'; P. Ochieng 44'

Benjamin Mkapa National Stadium, Dar es Salaam
Referee: Gervais Munyanziza (Rwanda)
30 November 2011
16:00

Malawi	0–0	Sudan
	Report

Benjamin Mkapa National Stadium, Dar es Salaam
Referee: Hudu Munyemana (Rwanda)

2 December 2011
16:00

Ethiopia	1–1	Malawi
Girma 16' (pen.)	Report	Kabichi 27'

Benjamin Mkapa National Stadium, Dar es Salaam
Referee: Israel Mujuni (Tanzania)
3 December 2011
14:00

Kenya	0–1	Sudan
	Report	Mowaia Fadasi 25'

Benjamin Mkapa National Stadium, Dar es Salaam
Referee: Wiish Yabarow (Somalia)

=== Ranking of third-placed teams ===
At the end of the first stage, a comparison was made between the third-placed teams of each group. The two best third-placed teams advanced to the quarter-finals.

Pos	Grp	Team	Pld	W	D	L	GF	GA	GD	Pts
1	B	Zanzibar	3	1	1	1	4	2	+2	4
2	A	Tanzania	3	1	0	2	4	3	+1	3
3	C	Kenya	3	1	0	2	2	3	−1	3

== Knockout stage ==
Quarter-finals
5 December – Dar es Salaam
Burundi	0
Sudan	2
5 December – Dar es Salaam
Rwanda	2
Zanzibar	1
6 December – Dar es Salaam
Uganda	1
Zimbabwe	0
6 December – Dar es Salaam
Malawi	0
Tanzania	1

Semi-finals
8 December – Dar es Salaam
Sudan	1
Rwanda	2
8 December – Dar es Salaam
Uganda (a.e.t.)	3
Tanzania	1

Final
10 December – Dar es Salaam
Rwanda	2 (2)
Uganda (pen.)	2 (3)
Third place
10 December – Dar es Salaam
Sudan	1
Tanzania	0

=== Quarter-finals ===
5 December 2011
14:00

Burundi	0–2	Sudan
	Report	Amir Rabea 41'; Musa 60'

Benjamin Mkapa National Stadium, Dar es Salaam
Referee: Ronnie Kalema (Uganda)
5 December 2011
16:00

Rwanda	2–1	Zanzibar
Mugiraneza 39'; Kagere 88'	Report	Mohammed 46'

Benjamin Mkapa National Stadium, Dar es Salaam
Referee: Bamlak Tessema Weyesa (Ethiopie)

6 December 2011
14:00

Uganda	1–0	Zimbabwe
Kizza 15'	Report

Benjamin Mkapa National Stadium, Dar es Salaam
Referee: Wiish Yabarow (Somalia)
6 December 2011
16:00

Malawi	0–1	Tanzania
	Report	Bakari 37'

Benjamin Mkapa National Stadium, Dar es Salaam
Referee: Hudu Munyemana (Rwanda)

=== Semi-finals ===
8 December 2011
14:00

Sudan	1–2	Rwanda
Ramadan 68'	Report	Iranzi 6'; Karekezi 78'

Benjamin Mkapa National Stadium, Dar es Salaam
Referee: Wiish Yabarow (Somalia)

8 December 2011
16:00

Uganda	3–1 (a.e.t.)	Tanzania
Mwesigwa 56'; Okwi 102'; Isinde 111' (pen.)	Report	Ngassa 18'

Benjamin Mkapa National Stadium, Dar es Salaam
Referee: Bamlak Tessema Weyesa (Ethiopia)

=== Third place play-off ===
10 December 2011
13:00

Sudan	1–0	Tanzania
Mohamed Sheikeldin 84'	Report

Benjamin Mkapa National Stadium, Dar es Salaam

=== Final ===
10 December 2011
15:15

Rwanda	2–2 (a.e.t.)	Uganda
Kagere 51', 79'	Report	Isinde 77'; Okwi 80' (Note: Olivier Karekezi headed the ball into his own net when he tried to brush off a corner from Emmanuel Okwi. However the referee awarded the goal to Emmanuel Okwi.)
Penalties
Kagere (penalty scored); Niyonzima (penalty scored); Mugiraneza (penalty missed); Gasana (penalty missed); Kagabo (penalty missed)	2–3	(penalty scored) Isinde; (penalty missed) Oloya; (penalty missed) Kavuma; (penalty scored) Kizza; (penalty scored) Mwesigwa

Benjamin Mkapa National Stadium, Dar es Salaam
Referee: Wiish Yabarow (Somalia)

2011 CECAFA Cup winners

Uganda
Twelfth title

== Awards ==
The following were the awards of the tournament:

Individual awards

- Best coach: Milutin Sredojević (Rwanda)
- Best goalkeeper: Elmoiz Mahgoug (Sudan)
- Best player: Haruna Niyonzima (Rwanda)
- Best referee: Wiish Yabarow (Somalia)
- Top scorers: Olivier Karekezi (Rwanda), Meddie Kagere (Rwanda), Emmanuel Okwi (Uganda)

Prize Money

- Champions: Uganda – $30,000
- Runner-up: Rwanda – $20,000
- Third place: Sudan – $10,000

== Goalscorers ==
5 goals

- (Rwanda) Meddie Kagere
- (Rwanda) Olivier Karekezi
- (Uganda) Emmanuel Okwi

2 goals

- (Burundi) Cédric Amissi
- (Djibouti) Ahmed Hassan Daoud
- (Rwanda) Jean-Baptiste Mugiraneza
- (Tanzania) Mwinyi Kazimoto
- (Uganda) Isaac Isinde
- (Uganda) Dan Wagaluka
- (Zimbabwe) Donald Ngoma

1 goal

- (Burundi) Floribert Ndayisaba
- (Burundi) Fuadi Ndayisenga
- (Burundi) Faty Papy
- (Ethiopia) Adane Girma
- (Ethiopia) Getaneh Kebede
- (Kenya) Bob Mugalia
- (Kenya) Pascal Ochieng
- (Malawi) John Banda
- (Malawi) Henry Kabichi
- (Malawi) Joseph Kamwendo
- (Rwanda) Labama Bokota
- (Rwanda) Jean-Claude Iranzi
- (Somalia) Khalid Ali
- (Sudan) Ramadan Agab
- (Sudan) Mohamed Shaikh Eldin
- (Sudan) Mowaia Fadasi
- (Sudan) Mohammed Musa
- (Sudan) Amir Rabea
- (Sudan) Muhannad El Tahir
- (Tanzania) Nurdin Bakari
- (Tanzania) Mrisho Ngassa
- (Tanzania) Yusuf Rashid
- (Tanzania) Thomas Ulimwengu
- (Uganda) Hamis Kizza
- (Uganda) Andrew Mwesigwa
- (Uganda) Mike Sserumaga
- (Zanzibar) Ali Badru Ali
- (Zanzibar) Abdulrahaman Mohammed
- (Zanzibar) Aggrey Morris
- (Zanzibar) Hamad Omar
- (Zanzibar) Kassim Suleiman Selembe
- (Zimbabwe) Qadr Amini

Own goal

- (Tanzania) Said Maulid (playing against Zimbabwe)
- (Uganda) Robert Odongkara (playing against Burundi)
