= Burkina Faso national football team results (2000–2019) =

This article provides details of international football games played by the Burkina Faso national football team from 2000 to 2019.

== Results ==
Key
Win
Draw
Defeat

=== 2000 ===
9 January 2000 Friendly	Burkina Faso	1–1	Gabon

11 January 2000 Friendly	Burkina Faso	2–2	Cameroon

20 January 2000 Friendly	Burkina Faso	1–0	Algeria

25 January 2000 2000 Africa Cup of Nations	Burkina Faso	1–3	Senegal

29 January 2000 2000 Africa Cup of Nations	Zambia	1–1	Burkina Faso

1 February 2000 2000 Africa Cup of Nations	Egypt	4–2	Burkina Faso

9 April 2000 2002 World Cup qualification	Ethiopia	2–1	Burkina Faso

19 April 2000 Friendly	Mali	2–1	Burkina Faso

23 April 2000 2002 World Cup qualification	Burkina Faso	3–0	Ethiopia

26 May 2000 Friendly	Algeria	2–0	Burkina Faso

14 June 2000 Friendly	Kenya	0–1	Burkina Faso

17 June 2000 2002 World Cup qualification	Malawi	1–1	Burkina Faso

30 June 2000 2002 Africa Cup of Nations qualification	Mauritania	0–0	Burkina Faso

16 July 2000 2002 Africa Cup of Nations qualification	Burkina Faso	3–0	Mauritania

3 September 2000 2002 Africa Cup of Nations qualification	Algeria	1–1	Burkina Faso

7 October 2000 2002 Africa Cup of Nations qualification	Burkina Faso	1–0	Burundi

=== 2001 ===
7 January 2001 Friendly	Togo	1–1	Burkina Faso

13 January 2001 2002 Africa Cup of Nations qualification	Burkina Faso	1–0	Angola

23 January 2001 Friendly	Burkina Faso	0–2	Mali

27 January 2001 2002 World Cup qualification	South Africa	1–0	Burkina Faso

24 February 2001 2002 World Cup qualification	Burkina Faso	1–2	Zimbabwe

25 March 2001 2002 Africa Cup of Nations qualification	Angola	2–0	Burkina Faso

21 April 2001 2002 World Cup qualification	Burkina Faso	4–2	Malawi

3 June 2001 2002 Africa Cup of Nations qualification	Burundi	0–0	Burkina Faso

17 June 2001 2002 Africa Cup of Nations qualification	Burkina Faso	1–0	Algeria

1 July 2001 2002 World Cup qualification	Burkina Faso	1–1	South Africa

15 July 2001 2002 World Cup qualification	Zimbabwe	1–0	Burkina Faso

16 October 2001 Friendly	Algeria	2–0	Burkina Faso

16 December 2001 Friendly	Burkina Faso	1–2	Togo

22 December 2001 Friendly	Togo	1–0	Burkina Faso

26 December 2001 Friendly	Senegal	2–4	Burkina Faso

28 December 2001 Friendly	Mali	2–1	Burkina Faso

=== 2002 ===
7 January 2002 Friendly	Burkina Faso	1–3	Cameroon

11 January 2002 Friendly	Egypt	2–2	Burkina Faso

15 January 2002 Friendly	Burkina Faso	2–1	Zambia

20 January 2002 2002 Africa Cup of Nations	South Africa	0–0	Burkina Faso

24 January 2002 2002 Africa Cup of Nations	Burkina Faso	1–2	Morocco

28 January 2002 2002 Africa Cup of Nations	Burkina Faso	1–2	Ghana

8 September 2002 2004 Africa Cup of Nations qualification	Congo	0–0	Burkina Faso

13 October 2002 2004 Africa Cup of Nations qualification	Burkina Faso	2–1	Central African Republic

27 December 2002 Friendly	Niger	1–1	Burkina Faso

=== 2003 ===
26 March 2003 Friendly	Burundi	0–0	Burkina Faso

30 March 2003 2004 Africa Cup of Nations qualification	Mozambique	1–0	Burkina Faso

29 May 2003 Friendly	Burkina Faso	1–0	Algeria

7 June 2003 2004 Africa Cup of Nations qualification	Burkina Faso	4–0	Mozambique

21 June 2003 2004 Africa Cup of Nations qualification	Burkina Faso	3–0	Congo

6 July 2003 2004 Africa Cup of Nations qualification	Central African Republic	0–3	Burkina Faso

24 September 2003 Friendly	Burkina Faso	1–0	Benin

26 September 2003 Friendly	Algeria	0–0	Burkina Faso

23 October 2003 Afro-Asian Games	Zimbabwe	4–1	Burkina Faso
	Prince Vusumuzi Nyoni 3', 74'; Albert Mbano 26', 82'		Barro Samba Seydou 16'

8 November 2003 Friendly	Gabon	0–0	Burkina Faso

15 November 2003 Friendly	Morocco	1–0	Burkina Faso

=== 2004 ===
17 January 2004 Friendly	Egypt	1–1	Burkina Faso

20 January 2004 Friendly	Guinea	1–0	Burkina Faso

26 January 2004 2004 Africa Cup of Nations	Senegal	0–0	Burkina Faso

30 January 2004 2004 Africa Cup of Nations	Burkina Faso	1–3	Mali

2 February 2004 2004 Africa Cup of Nations	Burkina Faso	0–3	Kenya

26 May 2004 Friendly	Benin	1–0	Burkina Faso

30 May 2004 Friendly	Burkina Faso	3–2	Libya

5 June 2004 2006 World Cup qualification	Burkina Faso	1–0	Ghana

12 June 2004 Friendly	Burkina Faso	4–2	Benin

20 June 2004 2006 World Cup qualification	DR Congo	3–2	Burkina Faso

3 July 2004 2006 World Cup qualification	South Africa	2–0	Burkina Faso

17 August 2004 Friendly	Algeria	2–2	Burkina Faso

4 September 2004 2006 World Cup qualification	Burkina Faso	2–0	Uganda

9 October 2004 2006 World Cup qualification	Cape Verde	1–0	Burkina Faso

17 November 2004 Friendly	Morocco	4–0	Burkina Faso

=== 2005 ===
9 February 2005 Friendly	Algeria	3–0	Burkina Faso

20 March 2005 Friendly	South Korea	1–0	Burkina Faso

26 March 2005 2006 World Cup qualification	Burkina Faso	1–2	Cape Verde

29 May 2005 Friendly	Togo	1–0	Burkina Faso

5 June 2005 2006 World Cup qualification	Ghana	2–1	Burkina Faso

18 June 2005 2006 World Cup qualification	Burkina Faso	2–0	DR Congo

3 September 2005 2006 World Cup qualification	Burkina Faso	3–1	South Africa

8 October 2005 2006 World Cup qualification	Uganda	2–2	Burkina Faso

=== 2006 ===
28 February 2006 Friendly	Algeria	0–0	Burkina Faso

16 August 2006 Friendly	Morocco	1–0	Burkina Faso

29 August 2006 Friendly	Uganda	0–0	Burkina Faso

2 September 2006 2008 Africa Cup of Nations qualification	Tanzania	2–1	Burkina Faso

7 October 2006 2008 Africa Cup of Nations qualification	Burkina Faso	1–0	Senegal

15 November 2006 Friendly	Burkina Faso	2–1	Algeria

=== 2007 ===
24 March 2007 2008 Africa Cup of Nations qualification	Burkina Faso	1–1	Mozambique

29 May 2007 Friendly	Zimbabwe	1–1	Burkina Faso

3 June 2007 2008 Africa Cup of Nations qualification	Mozambique	3–1	Burkina Faso

9 June 2007 Friendly	Burkina Faso	0–1	Mali

16 June 2007 2008 Africa Cup of Nations qualification	Burkina Faso	0–1	Tanzania

22 August 2007 Friendly	Mali	3–2	Burkina Faso

8 September 2007 2008 Africa Cup of Nations qualification	Senegal	5–1	Burkina Faso

=== 2008 ===
24 May 2008 Friendly	Cape Verde	1–0	Burkina Faso

1 June 2008 2010 World Cup qualification	Tunisia	1–2	Burkina Faso

7 June 2008 2010 World Cup qualification	Burkina Faso	2–0	Burundi

14 June 2008 2010 World Cup qualification	Seychelles	2–3	Burkina Faso

21 June 2008 2010 World Cup qualification	Burkina Faso	4–1	Seychelles

20 August 2008 Friendly	Bahrain	3–1	Burkina Faso

6 September 2008 2010 World Cup qualification	Burkina Faso	0–0	Tunisia

12 October 2008 2010 World Cup qualification	Burundi	1–3	Burkina Faso

=== 2009 ===
11 February 2009 Friendly	Burkina Faso	1–1	Togo

28 March 2009 2010 World Cup qualification	Burkina Faso	4–2	Guinea

6 June 2009 2010 World Cup qualification	Malawi	0–1	Burkina Faso

20 June 2009 2010 World Cup qualification	Burkina Faso	2–3	Ivory Coast

12 August 2009 Friendly	Mali	3–0	Burkina Faso

5 September 2009 2010 World Cup qualification	Ivory Coast	5–0	Burkina Faso

11 October 2009 2010 World Cup qualification	Guinea	1–2	Burkina Faso

14 November 2009 2010 World Cup qualification	Burkina Faso	1–0	Malawi

=== 2010 ===
11 January 2010 2010 Africa Cup of Nations	Ivory Coast	0–0	Burkina Faso

19 January 2010 2010 Africa Cup of Nations	Burkina Faso	0–1	Ghana

20 May 2010 Friendly	Yemen	2–2	Burkina Faso

22 May 2010 Friendly	Oman	2–0	Burkina Faso

11 August 2010 Friendly	Burkina Faso	3–0	Congo

5 September 2010 Friendly	Burkina Faso	1–1	Gabon

9 October 2010 2012 Africa Cup of Nations qualification	Burkina Faso	3–1	Gambia

17 November 2010 Friendly	Burkina Faso	2–1	Guinea

=== 2011 ===
9 February 2011 Friendly	Cape Verde	1–0	Burkina Faso

26 March 2011 2012 Africa Cup of Nations qualification	Burkina Faso	4–0	Namibia

4 June 2011 2012 Africa Cup of Nations qualification	Namibia	1–4	Burkina Faso

10 August 2011 Friendly	South Africa	3–0	Burkina Faso

3 September 2011 Friendly	Burkina Faso	1–0	Equatorial Guinea

8 October 2011 2012 Africa Cup of Nations qualification	Gambia	1–1	Burkina Faso

11 November 2011 Friendly	Burkina Faso	1–1	Mali

15 November 2011 Friendly	Burkina Faso	1–1	Guinea

=== 2012 ===
9 January 2012 Friendly	Gabon	0–0	Burkina Faso

22 January 2012 2012 Africa Cup of Nations	Burkina Faso	1–2	Angola

26 January 2012 2012 Africa Cup of Nations	Ivory Coast	2–0	Burkina Faso

30 January 2012 2012 Africa Cup of Nations	Sudan	2–1	Burkina Faso

29 February 2012 Friendly	Morocco	2–0	Burkina Faso

26 May 2012 Friendly	Burkina Faso	2–2	Benin

2 June 2012 2014 World Cup qualification	Burkina Faso	0–3	Congo

9 June 2012 2014 World Cup qualification	Gabon	1–0	Burkina Faso

14 August 2012 Friendly	Burkina Faso	3–0	Togo

8 September 2012 2013 Africa Cup of Nations qualification	Central African Republic	1–0	Burkina Faso

14 October 2012 2013 Africa Cup of Nations qualification	Burkina Faso	3–1	Central African Republic

14 November 2012 Friendly	Burkina Faso	1–0	DR Congo

26 December 2012 Friendly	Bahrain	0–0	Burkina Faso

=== 2013 ===
10 January 2013 Friendly	Burkina Faso	0–0	Niger

17 January 2013 Friendly	Burkina Faso	3–0	Eswatini

21 January 2013 2013 Africa Cup of Nations	Nigeria	1–1	Burkina Faso

25 January 2013 2013 Africa Cup of Nations	Burkina Faso	4–0	Ethiopia

29 January 2013 2013 Africa Cup of Nations	Burkina Faso	0–0	Zambia

3 February 2013 2013 Africa Cup of Nations	Burkina Faso	1–0 (a.e.t.)	Togo

6 February 2013 2013 Africa Cup of Nations	Burkina Faso	1–1 (a.e.t.) (3–2 p)	Ghana

10 February 2013 2013 Africa Cup of Nations	Nigeria	1–0	Burkina Faso

23 March 2013 2014 World Cup qualification	Burkina Faso	4–0	Niger

2 June 2013 Friendly	Algeria	2–0	Burkina Faso

9 June 2013 2014 World Cup qualification	Niger	0–1	Burkina Faso

15 June 2013 2014 World Cup qualification	Congo	0–1	Burkina Faso

14 August 2013 Friendly	Morocco	1–2	Burkina Faso

17 August 2013 Friendly	South Africa	2–0	Burkina Faso

7 September 2013 2014 World Cup qualification	Burkina Faso	1–0	Gabon

10 September 2013 Friendly	Nigeria	4–1	Burkina Faso

30 September 2013 Friendly	Botswana	1–0	Burkina Faso

12 October 2013 2014 World Cup qualification	Burkina Faso	3–2	Algeria

19 November 2013 2014 World Cup qualification	Algeria	1–0	Burkina Faso

=== 2014 ===
5 March 2014 Friendly	Burkina Faso	1–1	Comoros

21 May 2014 Friendly	Burkina Faso	1–1	Senegal

6 September 2014 2015 Africa Cup of Nations qualification	Burkina Faso	2–0	Lesotho

10 September 2014 2015 Africa Cup of Nations qualification	Angola	0–3	Burkina Faso

11 October 2014 2015 Africa Cup of Nations qualification	Gabon	2–0	Burkina Faso

15 October 2014 2015 Africa Cup of Nations qualification	Burkina Faso	1–1	Gabon

15 November 2014 2015 Africa Cup of Nations qualification	Lesotho	0–1	Burkina Faso

19 November 2014 2015 Africa Cup of Nations qualification	Burkina Faso	1–1	Angola

=== 2015 ===
10 January 2015 Friendly	Burkina Faso	5–1	Eswatini

17 January 2015 2015 Africa Cup of Nations	Burkina Faso	0–2	Gabon

21 January 2015 2015 Africa Cup of Nations	Equatorial Guinea	0–0	Burkina Faso

25 January 2015 2015 Africa Cup of Nations	Congo	2–1	Burkina Faso

12 May 2015 Friendly	Kazakhstan	0–0	Burkina Faso

6 June 2015 Friendly	Cameroon	3–2	Burkina Faso

13 June 2015 2017 Africa Cup of Nations qualification	Burkina Faso	2–0	Comoros

5 September 2015 2017 Africa Cup of Nations qualification	Botswana	1–0	Burkina Faso

9 October 2015 Friendly	Mali	4–1	Burkina Faso

17 October 2015 2016 African Nations Championship qualification	Nigeria	2–0	Burkina Faso

25 October 2015 2016 African Nations Championship qualification	Burkina Faso	0–0	Nigeria

12 November 2015 2018 World Cup qualification	Benin	2–1	Burkina Faso

17 November 2015 2018 World Cup qualification	Burkina Faso	2–0	Benin

=== 2016 ===
26 March 2016 2017 Africa Cup of Nations qualification	Burkina Faso	1–0	Uganda

29 March 2016 2017 Africa Cup of Nations qualification	Uganda	0–0	Burkina Faso

5 June 2016 2017 Africa Cup of Nations qualification	Comoros	0–1	Burkina Faso

24 August 2016 Friendly	Uzbekistan	1–0	Burkina Faso

4 September 2016 2017 Africa Cup of Nations qualification	Burkina Faso	2–1	Botswana

8 October 2016 2018 World Cup qualification	Burkina Faso	1–1	South Africa

12 November 2016 2018 World Cup qualification	Cape Verde	0–2	Burkina Faso

=== 2017 ===
7 January 2017 Friendly	Burkina Faso	2–1	Mali

14 January 2017 2017 Africa Cup of Nations	Burkina Faso	1–1	Cameroon

18 January 2017 2017 Africa Cup of Nations	Gabon	1–1	Burkina Faso

22 January 2017 2017 Africa Cup of Nations	Guinea-Bissau	0–2	Burkina Faso

28 January 2017 2017 Africa Cup of Nations	Burkina Faso	2–0	Tunisia

1 February 2017 2017 Africa Cup of Nations	Burkina Faso	1–1 (a.e.t.) (3–4 p)	Egypt

24 March 2017 Friendly	Morocco	2–0	Burkina Faso

2 June 2017 Friendly	Chile	3–0	Burkina Faso

10 June 2017 2019 Africa Cup of Nations qualification	Burkina Faso	3–1	Angola

2 September 2017 2018 World Cup qualification	Senegal	0–0	Burkina Faso

5 September 2017 2018 World Cup qualification	Burkina Faso	2–2	Senegal

7 October 2017 2018 World Cup qualification	South Africa	3–1	Burkina Faso

14 November 2017 2018 World Cup qualification	Burkina Faso	4–0	Cape Verde

12 August 2017 2018 African Nations Championship qualification	Burkina Faso	2–2	Ghana

20 August 2017 2018 African Nations Championship qualification	Ghana	1–2	Burkina Faso

=== 2018 ===
16 January 2018 2018 African Nations Championship	Angola	0–0	Burkina Faso

20 January 2018 2018 African Nations Championship	Congo	2–0	Burkina Faso

24 January 2018 2018 African Nations Championship	Burkina Faso	1–1	Cameroon

22 March 2018 Friendly	Burkina Faso	2–0	Guinea-Bissau	France

27 March 2018 Friendly	Kosovo	2–0	Burkina Faso	France

27 May 2018 Friendly	Burkina Faso	1–0	Cameroon	France

8 September 2018 2019 Africa Cup of Nations qualification	Mauritania	2–0	Burkina Faso	Nouakchott, Mauritania

13 October 2018 2019 Africa Cup of Nations qualification	Burkina Faso	3–0	Botswana	Ouagadougou, Burkina Faso

16 October 2018 2019 Africa Cup of Nations qualification	Botswana	0–0	Burkina Faso	Francistown, Botswana

18 November 2018 2019 Africa Cup of Nations qualification	Angola	2–1	Burkina Faso	Luanda, Angola

=== 2019 ===
22 March 2019 2019 Africa Cup of Nations qualification	Burkina Faso	1–0	Mauritania	Ouagadougou, Burkina Faso

9 June 2019 Friendly	Burkina Faso	0–0	DR Congo	Spain

4 September 2019 Friendly	Burkina Faso	1–0	Libya	Morocco

6 September 2019 Friendly	Morocco	1–1	Burkina Faso	Morocco

22 September 2019 2020 African Nations Championship qualification	Ghana	0–1	Burkina Faso	Kumasi, Ghana
				Stadium: Baba Yara Stadium

20 October 2019 2020 African Nations Championship qualification	Burkina Faso	0–0	Ghana	Ouagadougou, Burkina Faso

13 November 2019 2021 AFCONQ	Burkina Faso	0–0	Uganda	Ouagadougou, Burkina Faso

17 November 2019 2021 AFCONQ	South Sudan	1–2	Burkina Faso	Khartoum, Sudan
