= 2014 FIFA World Cup qualification – CAF second round =

Football tournament qualification stage

This page provides the summaries of the CAF second round matches for 2014 FIFA World Cup qualification.

== Format ==
The second round saw the top 28 ranked CAF teams joined by the 12 winners from the first round. These teams were drawn into ten groups of four teams, at the World Cup Preliminary Draw at the Marina da Glória in Rio de Janeiro, Brazil on 30 July 2011.

The matches were played from 1 June 2012 to 10 September 2013. The winners of each group advanced to the third round.

== Seeding ==
The July 2011 FIFA World Ranking was used to seed the teams.

Pot 1	Pot 2	Pot 3	Pot 4
Ivory Coast; Egypt; Ghana; Burkina Faso; Nigeria; Senegal; South Africa; Cameroon; Algeria; Tunisia	Gabon; Libya; Morocco; Guinea; Botswana; Malawi; Zambia; Uganda; Mali; Cape Verde	Benin; Zimbabwe; Central African Republic; Sierra Leone; Sudan; Niger; Gambia; Angola; Kenya^{†} Togo^{†}	Namibia^{†} Liberia^{†} Mozambique^{†} Equatorial Guinea^{†} Ethiopia^{†} Lesotho^{†} Rwanda^{†} DR Congo^{†} Congo^{†} Tanzania^{†}

^{†} First round winners whose identity was not known at the time of the draw

== Groups ==
=== Group A ===
Pos	Team	Pld	W	D	L	GF	GA	GD	Pts	Qualification	Ethiopia national football team	South Africa national soccer team	Botswana national football team	Central African Republic national football team
1	Ethiopia	6	4	1	1	8	6	+2	13	Third round	—	2–1	1–0	2–0
2	South Africa	6	3	2	1	12	5	+7	11		1–1	—	4–1	2–0
3	Botswana	6	2	1	3	8	10	−2	7		3–0 (Note: Awarded)	1–1	—	3–2
4	Central African Republic	6	1	0	5	5	12	−7	3		1–2	0–3	2–0	—

Notes:
2 June 2012
15:00 UTC+1

Central African Republic	2–0	Botswana
Kéthévoama 19', 49'	Report

Barthelemy Boganda Stadium, Bangui
Attendance: 20,000
Referee: Bernard Camille (Seychelles)
3 June 2012
15:00 UTC+2

South Africa	1–1	Ethiopia
Mphela 77'	Report	Saladin 28'

Royal Bafokeng Stadium, Rustenburg
Attendance: 13,611
Referee: Hamada Nampiandraza (Madagascar)

9 June 2012
15:00 UTC+2

Botswana	1–1	South Africa
Nato 38'	Report	Gould 14'

University of Botswana Stadium, Gaborone
Attendance: 7,500
Referee: Mahamadou Keita (Mali)
10 June 2012
16:00 UTC+3

Ethiopia	2–0	Central African Republic
Saladin 36', 88'	Report

Addis Ababa Stadium, Addis Ababa
Attendance: 25,000
Referee: Anthony Ramsy Raphael (Malawi)

23 March 2013
20:15 UTC+2

South Africa	2–0	Central African Republic
Matlaba 33'; Parker 71'	Report

Cape Town Stadium, Cape Town
Attendance: 36,740
Referee: Ali Kalyango (Uganda)
24 March 2013
16:00 UTC+3

Ethiopia	1–0	Botswana
Getaneh 89'	Report

Addis Ababa Stadium, Addis Ababa
Attendance: 22,000
Referee: Rédouane Jiyed (Morocco)

8 June 2013
15:00 UTC+2

Botswana	3–0 Awarded (Note: FIFA awarded Botswana a 3–0 win as a result of Ethiopia fielding the ineligible player Minyahile Beyene. The match originally ended 2–1 to Ethiopia.)	Ethiopia
Sembowa 76'	Report	Getaneh 34'; Saladin 45'

Lobatse Stadium, Lobatse
Attendance: 5,000
Referee: Dennis Batte (Uganda)
8 June 2013
15:00 UTC+1

Central African Republic	0–3	South Africa
	Report	Parker 26'; Tshabalala 41'; Mashego 90'

Stade Ahmadou Ahidjo, Yaoundé (Cameroon) (Note: Central African Republic's second and third home matches in the World Cup qualifiers against South Africa and Ethiopia were played at a neutral venue due to continued political instability in the Central African Republic.)
Attendance: 7,000
Referee: William Agbovi (Ghana)

15 June 2013
15:00 UTC+2

Botswana	3–2	Central African Republic
Ramatlhakwane 37' (pen.); Ngele 74'; Nato 86'	Report	Zimbori-Auzingoni 29', 50'

Lobatse Stadium, Lobatse
Attendance: 2,500
Referee: Juste Ephrem Zio (Burkina Faso)
16 June 2013
16:00 UTC+3

Ethiopia	2–1	South Africa
Getaneh 43'; Parker 70' (o.g.)	Report	Parker 34'

Addis Ababa Stadium, Addis Ababa
Attendance: 22,000
Referee: Mohamed Farouk Mahmoud (Egypt)

7 September 2013
15:30 UTC+2

South Africa	4–1	Botswana
Erasmus 28'; Furman 45'; Parker 84', 89' (pen.)	Report	Ramatlhakwane 73'

Moses Mabhida Stadium, Durban
Attendance: 28,712
Referee: Badara Diatta (Senegal)
7 September 2013
14:30 UTC+1

Central African Republic	1–2	Ethiopia
Kéïta 22'	Report	Saladin 48'; Teshome 61'

Stade Alphonse Massemba-Débat, Brazzaville (Congo)
Attendance: 1,500
Referee: Mohamed Benouza (Algeria)

=== Group B ===
Pos	Team	Pld	W	D	L	GF	GA	GD	Pts	Qualification	Tunisia national football team	Cape Verde national football team	Sierra Leone national football team	Equatorial Guinea national football team
1	Tunisia	6	4	2	0	13	6	+7	14	Third round	—	3–0 (Note: Awarded)	2–1	3–1
2	Cape Verde	6	3	0	3	9	7	+2	9		1–2	—	1–0	3–0
3	Sierra Leone	6	2	2	2	10	10	0	8		2–2	2–1	—	3–2
4	Equatorial Guinea	6	0	2	4	6	15	−9	2		1–1	0–3	2–2	—

Notes:
2 June 2012
16:30 UTC±0

Sierra Leone	2–1	Cape Verde
M. Kamara 11'; Suma 26'	Report	Soares 90+3'

National Stadium, Freetown
Attendance: 25,000
Referee: William Agbovi (Ghana)
2 June 2012
18:00 UTC+1

Tunisia	3–1	Equatorial Guinea
Jemâa 51'; Hammami 56', 86'	Report	Randy 34'

Stade Mustapha Ben Jannet, Monastir
Attendance: 10,000
Referee: Mehdi Abid Charef (Algeria)

9 June 2012
18:00 UTC+1

Equatorial Guinea	2–2	Sierra Leone
Juvenal 14', 40'	Report	Barlay 22'; T. Bangura 25'

Estadio de Malabo, Malabo
Attendance: 4,000
Referee: Adam Cordier (Chad)
9 June 2012
16:30 UTC−1

Cape Verde	1–2	Tunisia
Odaïr Fortes 26'	Report	Khelifa 14'; Jemâa 46'

Estádio da Várzea, Praia
Attendance: 3,600
Referee: Rédouane Jiyed (Morocco)

23 March 2013
19:10 UTC+1

Tunisia	2–1	Sierra Leone
Darragi 57'; Khazri 72'	Report	A. Kamara 74'

Stade Olympique de Radès, Tunis
Attendance: 10,000
Referee: Mal Mohamadou (Cameroon)
24 March 2013
17:00 UTC+1

Equatorial Guinea	0–3 Awarded (Note: FIFA awarded Cape Verde a 3–0 win as a result of Equatorial Guinea fielding the ineligible player Emilio Nsue. The match originally ended 4–3 to Equatorial Guinea.)	Cape Verde
Nsue 3', 16' (pen.), 78'; Rincón 87'	Report	Djaniny 5', 84'; Platini 18'

Estadio de Malabo, Malabo
Attendance: 8,000
Referee: Mahamadou Keita (Mali)

8 June 2013
16:30 UTC±0

Sierra Leone	2–2	Tunisia
K. Kamara 38'; Suma 70'	Report	Darragi 55' (pen.); Ben Youssef 89'

National Stadium, Freetown
Attendance: 20,000
Referee: Eric Otogo-Castane (Gabon)
8 June 2013
16:30 UTC−1

Cape Verde	3–0 Awarded (Note: FIFA awarded Cape Verde a 3–0 win as a result of Equatorial Guinea fielding the ineligible player Emilio Nsue. The match originally ended 2–1 to Cape Verde.)	Equatorial Guinea
Babanco 17'; Djaniny 52'	Report	Jônatas Obina 54'

Estádio da Várzea, Praia
Attendance: 3,500
Referee: Hélder Martins de Carvalho (Angola)

15 June 2013
16:30 UTC−1

Cape Verde	1–0	Sierra Leone
Héldon 13'	Report

Estádio da Várzea, Praia
Attendance: 3,500
Referee: Anthony Ramsy Raphael (Malawi)
16 June 2013
17:00 UTC+1

Equatorial Guinea	1–1	Tunisia
Juvenal 36' (pen.)	Report	Darragi 64' (pen.)

Estadio de Malabo, Malabo
Attendance: 8,000
Referee: Bernard Camille (Seychelles)

7 September 2013
16:30 UTC±0

Sierra Leone	3–2	Equatorial Guinea
H. Bangura 20'; Kargbo 38' (pen.); A. Kamara 68'	Report	Bermúdez 85'; Juvenal 88'

National Stadium, Freetown
Attendance: 3,000
Referee: El Fadil Mohamed (Sudan)
7 September 2013
19:45 UTC+1

Tunisia	3–0 Awarded (Note: FIFA awarded Tunisia a 3–0 win as a result of Cape Verde fielding the player Fernando Varela, who had been sent off in the match against Equatorial Guinea on 24 March 2013. As a result of his sending off for unsporting conduct towards a match official, Varela had been given a four match suspension and would miss the rest of the qualifying campaign plus one further FIFA game. Varela did not participate in the games against Equatorial Guinea on 8 June 2013 or the game against Sierra Leone on 16 June 2013. Complicating matters, Varela's red card against Equatorial Guinea was removed from the FIFA.com website. The match originally ended 2–0 to Cape Verde.)	Cape Verde
	Report	Platini 28'; Héldon 42'

Stade Olympique de Radès, Tunis
Attendance: 9,000
Referee: Bakary Gassama (Gambia)

=== Group C ===
Pos	Team	Pld	W	D	L	GF	GA	GD	Pts	Qualification	Ivory Coast national football team	Morocco national football team	Tanzania national football team	Gambia national football team
1	Ivory Coast	6	4	2	0	15	5	+10	14	Third round	—	1–1	2–0	3–0
2	Morocco	6	2	3	1	9	8	+1	9		2–2	—	2–1	2–0
3	Tanzania	6	2	0	4	8	12	−4	6		2–4	3–1	—	2–1
4	Gambia	6	1	1	4	4	11	−7	4		0–3	1–1	2–0	—

2 June 2012
16:30 UTC±0

Gambia	1–1	Morocco
Jammeh 15'	Report	Kharja 76'

Independence Stadium, Bakau
Attendance: 15,000
Referee: Néant Alioum (Cameroon)
2 June 2012
17:00 UTC±0

Ivory Coast	2–0	Tanzania
Kalou 10'; Drogba 71'	Report

Stade Félix Houphouët-Boigny, Abidjan
Attendance: 15,000
Referee: Slim Jedidi (Tunisia)

9 June 2012
21:00 UTC+1

Morocco	2–2	Ivory Coast
Kharja 42' (pen.); Abourazzouk 89'	Report	Kalou 8'; K. Touré 60'

Stade de Marrakech, Marrakesh
Attendance: 36,000
Referee: Gehad Grisha (Egypt)
10 June 2012
16:00 UTC+3

Tanzania	2–1	Gambia
Kapombe 61'; Nyoni 85' (pen.)	Report	M. Ceesay 8'

Benjamin Mkapa National Stadium, Dar es Salaam
Attendance: 20,000
Referee: Ruzive Ruzive (Zimbabwe)

23 March 2013
17:00 UTC±0

Ivory Coast	3–0	Gambia
Bony 51' (pen.); Y. Touré 57'; Kalou 70'	Report

Stade Félix Houphouët-Boigny, Abidjan
Attendance: 20,000
Referee: Eric Otogo-Castane (Gabon)
24 March 2013
15:00 UTC+3

Tanzania	3–1	Morocco
Ulimwengu 46'; Samata 67', 79'	Report	El-Arabi 90+3'

Benjamin Mkapa National Stadium, Dar es Salaam
Attendance: 40,000
Referee: Hélder Martins de Carvalho (Angola)

8 June 2013
16:30 UTC±0

Gambia	0–3	Ivory Coast
	Report	L. Traoré 12'; Bony 61'; Y. Touré 89'

Independence Stadium, Bakau
Attendance: 24,000
Referee: Janny Sikazwe (Zambia)
8 June 2013
21:00 UTC+1

Morocco	2–1	Tanzania
Hamdallah 39' (pen.); El-Arabi 51'	Report	Kiemba 26'

Stade de Marrakech, Marrakesh
Attendance: 15,000
Referee: Daniel Bennett (South Africa)

15 June 2013
21:00 UTC+1

Morocco	2–0	Gambia
Barrada 3'; Belhanda 51'	Report

Stade de Marrakech, Marrakesh
Attendance: 15,000
Referee: El Fadil Mohamed (Sudan)
16 June 2013
15:00 UTC+3

Tanzania	2–4	Ivory Coast
Kiemba 2'; Ulimwengu 34'	Report	Traoré 13'; Touré 23', 43' (pen.); Bony 90+3'

Benjamin Mkapa National Stadium, Dar es Salaam
Attendance: 60,000
Referee: Mehdi Abid Charef (Algeria)

7 September 2013
16:30 UTC±0

Gambia	2–0	Tanzania
Jarju 44', 51'	Report

Independence Stadium, Bakau
Attendance: 10,000
Referee: Hudu Munyemana (Rwanda)
7 September 2013
17:00 UTC±0

Ivory Coast	1–1	Morocco
Drogba 83' (pen.)	Report	El-Arabi 52'

Stade Félix Houphouët-Boigny, Abidjan
Attendance: 20,000
Referee: Bernard Camille (Seychelles)

=== Group D ===
Pos	Team	Pld	W	D	L	GF	GA	GD	Pts	Qualification	Ghana national football team	Zambia national football team	Lesotho national football team	Sudan national football team
1	Ghana	6	5	0	1	18	3	+15	15	Third round	—	2–1	7–0	4–0
2	Zambia	6	3	2	1	11	4	+7	11		1–0	—	4–0	1–1
3	Lesotho	6	1	2	3	4	15	−11	5		0–2	1–1	—	0–0
4	Sudan	6	0	2	4	3	14	−11	2		1–3	0–3 (Note: Awarded)	1–3	—

Notes:
1 June 2012
17:00 UTC±0

Ghana	7–0	Lesotho
Muntari 15'; Adiyiah 24', 49'; J. Ayew 45', 89'; Atsu 86'; Akaminko 90+1'	Report

Baba Yara Stadium, Kumasi
Attendance: 38,000
Referee: Badara Diatta (Senegal)
2 June 2012
20:00 UTC+3

Sudan	0–3 Awarded (Note: FIFA awarded Zambia a 3–0 win as a result of Sudan fielding the ineligible player Saif Eldin. The match originally ended 2–0 to Sudan.)	Zambia
Muhannad 50'; Saif Eldin 73'	Report

Al-Hilal Stadium, Omdurman
Attendance: 18,000
Referee: Aboubacar Mario Bangoura (Guinea)

9 June 2012
15:00 UTC+2

Zambia	1–0	Ghana
C. Katongo 15'	Report

Levy Mwanawasa Stadium, Ndola
Attendance: 40,000
Referee: Med Said Kordi (Tunisia)
10 June 2012
15:00 UTC+2

Lesotho	0–0	Sudan
	Report

Setsoto Stadium, Maseru
Attendance: 4,000
Referee: Rainhold Shikongo (Namibia)

24 March 2013
15:00 UTC+2

Lesotho	1–1	Zambia
Marabe 88'	Report	Mbesuma 74'

Setsoto Stadium, Maseru
Attendance: 15,000
Referee: Malang Diedhiou (Senegal)
24 March 2013
16:00 UTC±0

Ghana	4–0	Sudan
Gyan 19'; Wakaso 38'; Waris 80'; Agyemang-Badu 83'	Report

Baba Yara Stadium, Kumasi
Attendance: 38,000
Referee: Anthony Ramsy Raphael (Malawi)

7 June 2013
20:00 UTC+3

Sudan	1–3	Ghana
Mudather El Tahir 26' (pen.)	Report	Gyan 20', 57'; Muntari 83'

Al-Merrikh Stadium, Omdurman
Attendance: 3,211
Referee: Ousmane Fall (Senegal)
8 June 2013
15:00 UTC+2

Zambia	4–0	Lesotho
Mulenga 36', 63'; C. Katongo 61'; Mbesuma 83'	Report

Levy Mwanawasa Stadium, Ndola
Attendance: 36,000
Referee: Ali Lemghaifry (Mauritania)

15 June 2013
15:00 UTC+2

Zambia	1–1	Sudan
Mulenga 69'	Report	Salah 70'

Levy Mwanawasa Stadium, Ndola
Attendance: 37,200
Referee: Eric Otogo-Castane (Gabon)
16 June 2013
15:00 UTC+2

Lesotho	0–2	Ghana
	Report	Boye 45'; Gyan 82'

Setsoto Stadium, Maseru
Attendance: 1,961
Referee: Thierry Nkurunziza (Burundi)

6 September 2013
16:00 UTC±0

Ghana	2–1	Zambia
Waris 17'; Asamoah 60'	Report	Sinkala 71'

Baba Yara Stadium, Kumasi
Attendance: 40,000
Referee: Djamel Haimoudi (Algeria)
8 September 2013
20:00 UTC+3

Sudan	1–3	Lesotho
Bakri 2'	Report	Seturumane 45'; Lekhoana 75'; Koetle 77'

Al-Hilal Stadium, Omdurman
Attendance: 5,000
Referee: Sylvester Kirwa (Kenya)

=== Group E ===
Pos	Team	Pld	W	D	L	GF	GA	GD	Pts	Qualification	Burkina Faso national football team	Congo national football team	Gabon national football team	Niger national football team
1	Burkina Faso	6	4	0	2	7	4	+3	12	Third round	—	0–3 (Note: Awarded)	1–0	4–0
2	Congo	6	3	2	1	7	3	+4	11		0–1	—	1–0	1–0
3	Gabon	6	2	1	3	5	6	−1	7		1–0	0–0	—	4–1
4	Niger	6	1	1	4	6	12	−6	4		0–1	2–2	3–0	—

Notes:
2 June 2012
18:00 UTC±0

Burkina Faso	0–3 Awarded (Note: FIFA awarded Congo a 3–0 win as a result of Burkina Faso fielding the ineligible player Herve Xavier Zengue. The match originally ended 0–0.)	Congo
	Report

Stade du 4-Août, Ouagadougou
Attendance: 23,904
Referee: Bouchaïb El Ahrach (Morocco)
3 June 2012
16:00 UTC+1

Niger	3–0 Awarded (Note: FIFA awarded Niger a 3–0 win as a result of Gabon fielding the ineligible player Charly Moussono. The match originally ended 0–0.)	Gabon
	Report

Stade Général Seyni Kountché, Niamey
Attendance: 20,000
Referee: Djamel Haimoudi (Algeria)

9 June 2012
15:30 UTC+1

Congo	1–0	Niger
Malonga 89'	Report

Stade Municipal, Pointe-Noire
Attendance: 10,500
Referee: Hudu Munyemana (Rwanda)
9 June 2012
15:30 UTC+1

Gabon	1–0	Burkina Faso
Ebanega 57'	Report

Stade d'Angondjé, Libreville
Attendance: 23,000
Referee: Ousmane Fall (Senegal)

23 March 2013
15:30 UTC+1

Congo	1–0	Gabon
Samba 61'	Report

Stade Municipal, Pointe-Noire
Attendance: 13,000
Referee: Bakary Gassama (Gambia)
23 March 2013
18:00 UTC±0

Burkina Faso	4–0	Niger
Pitroipa 3'; Bancé 34'; Kaboré 77'; Nakoulma 86'	Report

Stade du 4-Août, Ouagadougou
Attendance: 35,000
Referee: Noumandiez Doué (Ivory Coast)

8 June 2013
15:30 UTC+1

Gabon	0–0	Congo
	Report

Stade de Franceville, Franceville
Attendance: 27,500
Referee: Gehad Grisha (Egypt)
9 June 2013
16:00 UTC+1

Niger	0–1	Burkina Faso
	Report	Pitroipa 80'

Stade Général Seyni Kountché, Niamey
Attendance: 18,000
Referee: Tessema Bamlak (Ethiopia)

15 June 2013
15:30 UTC+1

Congo	0–1	Burkina Faso
	Report	Bancé 38'

Stade Municipal, Pointe-Noire
Attendance: 13,497
Referee: Rainhold Shikongo (Namibia)
15 June 2013
16:00 UTC+1

Gabon	4–1	Niger
P. Aubameyang 42' (pen.), 87' (pen.), 90+7' (pen.); Manga 90+6'	Report	Ali 14'

Stade de Franceville, Franceville
Attendance: 12,000
Referee: Samuel Chirindza (Mozambique)

7 September 2013
15:30 UTC±0

Burkina Faso	1–0	Gabon
Nakoulma 53'	Report

Stade du 4-Août, Ouagadougou
Attendance: 30,000
Referee: Rajindraparsad Seechurn (Mauritius)
7 September 2013
16:30 UTC+1

Niger	2–2	Congo
Cissé 35'; Daouda 70'	Report	N'Guessi 66'; Kapolongo 76'

Stade Général Seyni Kountché, Niamey
Attendance: 20,000
Referee: Koman Coulibaly (Mali)

=== Group F ===
Pos	Team	Pld	W	D	L	GF	GA	GD	Pts	Qualification	Nigeria national football team	Malawi national football team	Kenya national football team	Namibia national football team
1	Nigeria	6	3	3	0	7	3	+4	12	Third round	—	2–0	1–1	1–0
2	Malawi	6	1	4	1	4	5	−1	7		1–1	—	2–2	0–0
3	Kenya	6	1	3	2	4	5	−1	6		0–1	0–0	—	1–0
4	Namibia	6	1	2	3	2	4	−2	5		1–1	0–1	1–0	—

2 June 2012
16:00 UTC+3

Kenya	0–0	Malawi
	Report

Moi International Sports Centre, Nairobi
Attendance: 14,000
Referee: Eric Otogo-Castane (Gabon)
3 June 2012
16:00 UTC+1

Nigeria	1–0	Namibia
I. Uche 80'	Report

U. J. Esuene Stadium, Calabar
Attendance: 10,000
Referee: Khalid Abdel Rahman (Sudan)

9 June 2012
14:30 UTC+2

Malawi	1–1	Nigeria
Banda 90+3'	Report	Egwuekwe 89'

Kamuzu Stadium, Blantyre
Attendance: 25,000
Referee: Rajindraparsad Seechurn (Mauritius)
9 June 2012
18:00 UTC+1

Namibia	1–0	Kenya
Botes 75'	Report

Sam Nujoma Stadium, Windhoek
Attendance: 12,000
Referee: Joshua Bondo (Botswana)

23 March 2013
16:00 UTC+1

Nigeria	1–1	Kenya
Oduamadi 90+4'	Report	Kahata 35'

U. J. Esuene Stadium, Calabar
Attendance: 7,475
Referee: Joshua Bondo (Botswana)
23 March 2013
17:00 UTC+2

Namibia	0–1	Malawi
	Report	Mhango 71'

Sam Nujoma Stadium, Windhoek
Attendance: 5,000
Referee: Med Said Kordi (Tunisia)

5 June 2013 (Note: The Group F fixtures on matchday four and five were moved to 5 June and 12 June respectively to allow Nigeria to participate in the 2013 FIFA Confederations Cup.)
14:30 UTC+2

Malawi	0–0	Namibia
	Report

Kamuzu Stadium, Blantyre
Attendance: 17,000
Referee: Koman Coulibaly (Mali)
5 June 2013
16:00 UTC+3

Kenya	0–1	Nigeria
	Report	Musa 80'

Moi International Sports Centre, Nairobi
Attendance: 30,000
Referee: Noumandiez Doué (Ivory Coast)

12 June 2013
14:30 UTC+2

Malawi	2–2	Kenya
Ngalande 47'; Ng'ambi 81'	Report	Murunga 53'; Chavula 88' (o.g.)

Kamuzu Stadium, Blantyre
Attendance: 13,000
Referee: Ali Adelaïd (Comoros)
12 June 2013
20:00 UTC+1

Namibia	1–1	Nigeria
Kavendji 77'	Report	Oboabona 82'

Sam Nujoma Stadium, Windhoek
Attendance: 9,000
Referee: Mensur Maeruf (Eritrea)

7 September 2013
16:00 UTC+1

Nigeria	2–0	Malawi
Emenike 45+1'; Moses 50' (pen.)	Report

U. J. Esuene Stadium, Calabar
Attendance: 8,000
Referee: Hamada Nampiandraza (Madagascar)
8 September 2013
16:00 UTC+3

Kenya	1–0	Namibia
Owino 6'	Report

Moi International Sports Centre, Nairobi
Attendance: 20,000
Referee: Gehad Grisha (Egypt)

=== Group G ===
Pos	Team	Pld	W	D	L	GF	GA	GD	Pts	Qualification	Egypt national football team	Guinea national football team	Mozambique national football team	Zimbabwe national football team
1	Egypt	6	6	0	0	16	7	+9	18	Third round	—	4–2	2–0	2–1
2	Guinea	6	3	1	2	12	8	+4	10		2–3	—	6–1	1–0
3	Mozambique	6	0	3	3	2	10	−8	3		0–1	0–0	—	0–0
4	Zimbabwe	6	0	2	4	4	9	−5	2		2–4	0–1	1–1	—

1 June 2012
20:00 UTC+2

Egypt	2–0	Mozambique
Fathalla 55'; Zidan 62'	Report

Borg El Arab Stadium, Alexandria
Attendance: 0
Referee: Sylvester Kirwa (Kenya)
3 June 2012
15:00 UTC+2

Zimbabwe	0–1	Guinea
	Report	I. Traoré 27'

National Sports Stadium, Harare
Attendance: 30,000
Referee: Rajindraparsad Seechurn (Mauritius)

10 June 2012
15:00 UTC+2

Mozambique	0–0	Zimbabwe
	Report

Estádio do Zimpeto, Maputo
Attendance: 26,000
Referee: Ali Kalyango (Uganda)
10 June 2012
17:00 UTC±0

Guinea	2–3	Egypt
A. Camara 20' (pen.); A. Bangoura 88'	Report	Aboutrika 58', 66' (pen.); Salah 90+3'

Stade du 28 Septembre, Conakry
Attendance: 14,000
Referee: Néant Alioum (Cameroon)

24 March 2013
15:00 UTC+2

Mozambique	0–0	Guinea
	Report

Estádio do Zimpeto, Maputo
Attendance: 25,000
Referee: El Fadil Mohamed (Sudan)
26 March 2013
19:00 UTC+2

Egypt	2–1	Zimbabwe
Abd Rabo 64'; Aboutrika 88' (pen.)	Report	Musona 74'

Borg El Arab Stadium, Alexandria
Attendance: 10,000
Referee: Badara Diatta (Senegal)

9 June 2013
15:00 UTC+2

Zimbabwe	2–4	Egypt
Musona 21'; Zvasiya 81'	Report	Aboutrika 5'; Salah 40', 76', 83'

National Sports Stadium, Harare
Attendance: 40,000
Referee: Bakary Gassama (Gambia)
9 June 2013
17:00 UTC±0

Guinea	6–1	Mozambique
M. Yattara 15', 90'; S. Diallo 33', 45' (pen.); I. Traoré 76'; Diarra 81'	Report	Domingues 44' (pen.)

Stade du 28 Septembre, Conakry
Attendance: 14,000
Referee: Kouamé N'Dri (Ivory Coast)

16 June 2013
15:00 UTC+2

Mozambique	0–1	Egypt
	Report	Salah 40'

Estádio da Machava, Maputo
Attendance: 25,000
Referee: Janny Sikazwe (Zambia)
16 June 2013
17:00 UTC±0

Guinea	1–0	Zimbabwe
M. Yattara 37'	Report

Stade du 28 Septembre, Conakry
Attendance: 14,000
Referee: Hamada Nampiandraza (Madagascar)

8 September 2013
15:00 UTC+2

Zimbabwe	1–1	Mozambique
Mambare 42'	Report	Maninho 69'

Rufaro Stadium, Harare
Attendance: 7,000
Referee: Mahamadou Keita (Mali)
10 September 2013
16:00 UTC+2

Egypt	4–2	Guinea
Ghaly 38'; Aboutrika 51' (pen.); Salah 83'; Zaki 86'	Report	El-Abd 4' (o.g.); Soumah 57'

El Gouna Stadium, El Gouna
Attendance: 0
Referee: Tessema Bamlak (Ethiopia)

=== Group H ===
Pos	Team	Pld	W	D	L	GF	GA	GD	Pts	Qualification	Algeria national football team	Mali national football team	Benin national football team	Rwanda national football team
1	Algeria	6	5	0	1	13	4	+9	15	Third round	—	1–0	3–1	4–0
2	Mali	6	2	2	2	7	7	0	8		2–1	—	2–2	1–1
3	Benin	6	2	2	2	8	9	−1	8		1–3	1–0	—	2–0
4	Rwanda	6	0	2	4	3	11	−8	2		0–1	1–2	1–1	—

2 June 2012
20:30 UTC+1

Algeria	4–0	Rwanda
Feghouli 26'; Soudani 31', 82'; Slimani 79'	Report

Stade Mustapha Tchaker, Blida
Attendance: 30,000
Referee: Bakary Gassama (Gambia)
3 June 2012
16:00 UTC+1

Benin	1–0	Mali
Omotoyossi 18'	Report

Stade de l'Amitié, Cotonou
Attendance: 20,000
Referee: Janny Sikazwe (Zambia)

10 June 2012
15:30 UTC+2

Rwanda	1–1	Benin
Bokota 86' (pen.)	Report	Omotoyossi 74'

Stade Amahoro, Kigali
Attendance: 15,000
Referee: Tessema Bamlak (Ethiopia)
10 June 2012
19:00 UTC±0

Mali	2–1	Algeria
N'Diaye 30'; Maïga 81'	Report	Slimani 6'

Stade du 4-Août, Ouagadougou (Burkina Faso) (Note: Mali's opening home match in the World Cup qualifiers against Algeria was played at a neutral venue due to continued political instability in Mali.)
Attendance: 5,847
Referee: Daniel Bennett (South Africa)

24 March 2013
15:30 UTC+2

Rwanda	1–2	Mali
Kagere 36'	Report	Samassa 49'; A. Traoré 54'

Stade Amahoro, Kigali
Attendance: 10,000
Referee: Hamada Nampiandraza (Madagascar)
26 March 2013
20:30 UTC+1

Algeria	3–1	Benin
Feghouli 10'; Taïder 59'; Slimani 90+2'	Report	Gestede 26'

Stade Mustapha Tchaker, Blida
Attendance: 32,000
Referee: Rajindraparsad Seechurn (Mauritius)

9 June 2013
16:00 UTC+1

Benin	1–3	Algeria
Gestede 31'	Report	Slimani 38', 42'; Ghilas 78'

Stade Charles de Gaulle, Porto-Novo
Attendance: 8,000
Referee: Néant Alioum (Cameroon)
9 June 2013
18:00 UTC±0

Mali	1–1	Rwanda
N'Diaye 78'	Report	Kagere 33'

Stade 26 mars, Bamako
Attendance: 30,000
Referee: Med Said Kordi (Tunisia)

16 June 2013
15:30 UTC+2

Rwanda	0–1	Algeria
	Report	Taïder 51'

Stade Amahoro, Kigali
Attendance: 15,000
Referee: Yakhouba Keita (Guinea)
16 June 2013
18:00 UTC±0

Mali	2–2	Benin
Samassa 14' (pen.); Diabaté 69'	Report	Sessègnon 7'; Omotoyossi 31'

Stade 26 mars, Bamako
Attendance: 30,000
Referee: Bouchaïb El Ahrach (Morocco)

8 September 2013
16:00 UTC+1

Benin	2–0	Rwanda
Poté 36'; Babatounde 53'	Report

Stade Charles de Gaulle, Porto-Novo
Attendance: 16,872
Referee: Aboubacar Mario Bangoura (Guinea)
10 September 2013
20:30 UTC+1

Algeria	1–0	Mali
Soudani 50'	Report

Stade Mustapha Tchaker, Blida
Attendance: 23,500
Referee: Eric Otogo-Castane (Gabon)

=== Group I ===
Pos	Team	Pld	W	D	L	GF	GA	GD	Pts	Qualification	Cameroon national football team	Libya national football team	DR Congo national football team	Togo national football team
1	Cameroon	6	4	1	1	8	3	+5	13	Third round	—	1–0	1–0	2–1
2	Libya	6	2	3	1	5	3	+2	9		2–1	—	0–0	2–0
3	DR Congo	6	1	3	2	3	3	0	6		0–0	0–0	—	2–0
4	Togo	6	1	1	4	4	11	−7	4		0–3 (Note: Awarded)	1–1	2–1	—

Notes:
2 June 2012
15:30 UTC+1

Cameroon	1–0	DR Congo
Choupo-Moting 54' (pen.)	Report

Ahmadou Ahidjo Stadium, Yaoundé
Attendance: 10,000
Referee: Daniel Bennett (South Africa)
3 June 2012
15:30 UTC±0

Togo	1–1	Libya
Damessi 8'	Report	Zuway 16'

Stade de Kégué, Lomé
Attendance: 15,000
Referee: Koman Coulibaly (Mali)

10 June 2012
15:30 UTC+1

DR Congo	2–0	Togo
Mputu 23'; Mbokani 81' (pen.)	Report

Stade des Martyrs, Kinshasa
Attendance: 50,000
Referee: Mohamed Farouk Mahmoud (Egypt)
10 June 2012
17:00 UTC+1

Libya	2–1	Cameroon
Zuway 6'; Ahniash 90+3'	Report	Choupo-Moting 15'

Stade Taïeb Mhiri, Sfax (Tunisia) (Note: Libya's opening home match in the World Cup qualifiers against Cameroon was played at a neutral venue. The match was ordered to be played behind closed doors due to security concerns, but the official match report indicates a small crowd was present.)
Attendance: 1,000
Referee: Mensur Maeruf (Eritrea)

23 March 2013
15:30 UTC+1

Cameroon	2–1	Togo
Eto'o 41' (pen.), 82'	Report	Womé 45+1'

Ahmadou Ahidjo Stadium, Yaoundé
Attendance: 30,000
Referee: Djamel Haimoudi (Algeria)
24 March 2013
15:30 UTC+1

DR Congo	0–0	Libya
	Report

Stade des Martyrs, Kinshasa
Attendance: 53,500
Referee: William Agbovi (Ghana)

7 June 2013
17:30 UTC+2

Libya	0–0	DR Congo
	Report

June 11 Stadium, Tripoli
Attendance: 35,000
Referee: Joshua Bondo (Botswana)
9 June 2013
15:30 UTC±0

Togo	0–3 Awarded (Note: FIFA awarded Cameroon a 3–0 win as a result of Togo fielding the ineligible player Alaixys Romao. The match originally ended 2–0 to Togo.)	Cameroon
Amewou 31'; Atakora 71'	Report

Stade de Kégué, Lomé
Attendance: 20,000
Referee: Rajindraparsad Seechurn (Mauritius)

14 June 2013
18:00 UTC+2

Libya	2–0	Togo
Al Badri 7' (pen.); Amewou 17' (o.g.)	Report

June 11 Stadium, Tripoli (Note: The venue of Libya's home match against Togo was changed from Martyrs of February Stadium, Benina to June 11 Stadium, Tripoli following security incidents in Benghazi.)
Attendance: 40,000
Referee: Mohamed Benouza (Algeria)
16 June 2013
15:30 UTC+1

DR Congo	0–0	Cameroon
	Report

Stade des Martyrs, Kinshasa
Attendance: 80,000
Referee: Badara Diatta (Senegal)

8 September 2013
15:30 UTC+1

Cameroon	1–0	Libya
Chedjou 41'	Report

Ahmadou Ahidjo Stadium, Yaoundé
Attendance: 35,000
Referee: Noumandiez Doué (Ivory Coast)
8 September 2013
15:30 UTC±0

Togo	2–1	DR Congo
Atakora 35'; Aloenouvo 90+3'	Report	Simbi 81'

Stade de Kégué, Lomé
Attendance: 16,000
Referee: Bouchaïb El Ahrach (Morocco)

=== Group J ===
Pos	Team	Pld	W	D	L	GF	GA	GD	Pts	Qualification	Senegal national football team	Uganda national football team	Angola national football team	Liberia national football team
1	Senegal	6	3	3	0	9	4	+5	12	Third round	—	1–0	1–1	3–1
2	Uganda	6	2	2	2	5	6	−1	8		1–1	—	2–1	1–0
3	Angola	6	1	4	1	7	5	+2	7		1–1	1–1	—	3–0 (Note: Awarded)
4	Liberia	6	1	1	4	3	9	−6	4		0–2	2–0	0–0	—

Notes:
2 June 2012
18:00 UTC±0

Senegal	3–1	Liberia
Baldé 33'; N'Doye 71'; Mané 83'	Report	Doe 15'

Stade Léopold Sédar Senghor, Dakar
Attendance: 15,000
Referee: Noumandiez Doué (Ivory Coast)
3 June 2012
16:00 UTC+1

Angola	1–1	Uganda
Djalma 7'	Report	Okwi 88'

Estádio 11 de Novembro, Luanda
Attendance: 48,000
Referee: Gehad Grisha (Egypt)

9 June 2012
16:00 UTC+3

Uganda	1–1	Senegal
Walusimbi 87' (pen.)	Report	Cissé 37'

Nelson Mandela National Stadium, Kampala
Attendance: 30,000
Referee: Mohamed Benouza (Algeria)
10 June 2012
16:00 UTC±0

Liberia	0–0	Angola
	Report

Antoinette Tubman Stadium, Monrovia
Attendance: 15,000
Referee: Ali Lemghaifry (Mauritania)

23 March 2013
17:00 UTC±0

Senegal	1–1	Angola
Sow 40'	Report	Amaro 75'

Stade du 28 Septembre, Conakry (Guinea) (Note: Senegal had to play their last two home matches in the World Cup qualifiers against Angola and Uganda at a neutral venue, due to a one-year ban from playing at their home stadium imposed by the CAF following riots in their 2013 Africa Cup of Nations qualification match against Ivory Coast.)
Attendance: 13,500
Referee: Néant Alioum (Cameroon)
24 March 2013
16:00 UTC±0

Liberia	2–0	Uganda
Wleh 32'; Laffor 50'	Report

Samuel Kanyon Doe Sports Complex, Paynesville
Attendance: 25,000
Referee: Mohamed Farouk Mahmoud (Egypt)

8 June 2013
16:00 UTC+3

Uganda	1–0	Liberia
Mawejje 4'	Report

Nelson Mandela National Stadium, Kampala
Attendance: 8,400
Referee: Adam Cordier (Chad)
8 June 2013
16:00 UTC+1

Angola	1–1	Senegal
Guilherme 51'	Report	Cissé 23'

Estádio 11 de Novembro, Luanda
Attendance: 40,000
Referee: Bernard Camille (Seychelles)

15 June 2013
16:00 UTC+3

Uganda	2–1	Angola
Okwi 83'; Mawejje 89'	Report	Job 57'

Nelson Mandela National Stadium, Kampala
Attendance: 40,000
Referee: Rédouane Jiyed (Morocco)
16 June 2013
16:00 UTC±0

Liberia	0–2	Senegal
	Report	Cissé 18' (pen.), 53'

Samuel Kanyon Doe Sports Complex, Paynesville
Attendance: 35,000
Referee: Davies Omweno (Kenya)

7 September 2013
16:00 UTC+1

Angola	3–0 Awarded (Note: FIFA awarded Angola a 3–0 win as a result of Liberia fielding the ineligible player Nathaniel Sherman. The match originally ended 4–1 to Angola.)	Liberia
Guedes 2'; Mabululu 48'; Guilherme 61'; Abdul 64'	Report	Macauley 79'

Tundavala National Stadium, Lubango
Attendance: 3,000
Referee: Slim Jedidi (Tunisia)
7 September 2013
21:00 UTC+1

Senegal	1–0	Uganda
Mané 85'	Report

Stade de Marrakech, Marrakesh (Morocco)
Attendance: 2,000
Referee: Daniel Bennett (South Africa)

== Goalscorers ==
There were 291 goals scored in 120 matches, for an average of 2.42 goals per match.

6 goals

- (Egypt) Mohamed Salah

5 goals

- (Algeria) Islam Slimani
- (Egypt) Mohamed Aboutrika
- (Ethiopia) Saladin Said
- (South Africa) Bernard Parker

4 goals

- (Equatorial Guinea) Juvenal
- (Ghana) Asamoah Gyan
- (Ivory Coast) Yaya Touré
- (Senegal) Papiss Cissé

3 goals

- (Algeria) Hillal Soudani
- (Benin) Razak Omotoyossi
- (Cape Verde) Djaniny
- (Equatorial Guinea) Emilio Nsue
- (Ethiopia) Getaneh Kebede
- (Gabon) Pierre-Emerick Aubameyang
- (Guinea) Mohamed Yattara
- (Ivory Coast) Wilfried Bony
- (Ivory Coast) Salomon Kalou
- (Morocco) Youssef El-Arabi
- (Tunisia) Oussama Darragi
- (Zambia) Jacob Mulenga

2 goals

- (Algeria) Sofiane Feghouli
- (Algeria) Saphir Taïder
- (Angola) Guilherme
- (Benin) Rudy Gestede
- (Botswana) Ofentse Nato
- (Botswana) Jerome Ramatlhakwane
- (Burkina Faso) Aristide Bancé
- (Burkina Faso) Jonathan Pitroipa
- (Burkina Faso) Prejuce Nakoulma
- (Cameroon) Eric Choupo-Moting
- (Cameroon) Samuel Eto'o
- (Cape Verde) Héldon Ramos
- (Cape Verde) Platini
- (Central African Republic) Foxi Kéthévoama
- (Central African Republic) Nicaise Zimbori-Auzingoni
- (The Gambia) Mustapha Jarju
- (Ghana) Dominic Adiyiah
- (Ghana) Jordan Ayew
- (Ghana) Sulley Muntari
- (Ghana) Abdul Majeed Waris
- (Guinea) Sadio Diallo
- (Guinea) Ibrahima Traoré
- (Ivory Coast) Didier Drogba
- (Ivory Coast) Lacina Traoré
- (Libya) Ahmed Zuway
- (Mali) Mahamadou N'Diaye
- (Mali) Mahamadou Samassa
- (Morocco) Houssine Kharja
- (Rwanda) Meddie Kagere
- (Senegal) Sadio Mané
- (Sierra Leone) Alhassan Kamara
- (Sierra Leone) Sheriff Suma
- (Tanzania) Amri Kiemba
- (Tanzania) Mbwana Samata
- (Tanzania) Thomas Ulimwengu
- (Togo) Lalawélé Atakora
- (Tunisia) Chadi Hammami
- (Tunisia) Issam Jemâa
- (Uganda) Tony Mawejje
- (Uganda) Emmanuel Okwi
- (Zambia) Christopher Katongo
- (Zambia) Collins Mbesuma
- (Zimbabwe) Knowledge Musona

1 goal

- (Angola) Abdul
- (Angola) Amaro
- (Angola) Djalma
- (Angola) Guedes
- (Angola) Mabululu
- (Angola) Job
- (Algeria) Nabil Ghilas
- (Benin) Stéphane Sessègnon
- (Benin) Bello Babatounde
- (Benin) Mickaël Poté
- (Botswana) Mogakolodi Ngele
- (Botswana) Tebogo Sembowa
- (Burkina Faso) Charles Kaboré
- (Cameroon) Aurélien Chedjou
- (Cape Verde) Marco Soares
- (Cape Verde) Odaïr Fortes
- (Cape Verde) Babanco
- (Central African Republic) Salif Kéïta
- (Republic of the Congo) Chris Malonga
- (Republic of the Congo) Christopher Samba
- (Republic of the Congo) Fabrice N'Guessi
- (Republic of the Congo) Ulrich Kapolongo
- (Democratic Republic of the Congo) Dieumerci Mbokani
- (Democratic Republic of the Congo) Trésor Mputu
- (Democratic Republic of the Congo) Patou Ebunga-Simbi
- (Egypt) Amr Zaki
- (Egypt) Hosny Abd Rabo
- (Egypt) Mahmoud Fathallah
- (Egypt) Mohamed Zidan
- (Egypt) Hossam Ghaly
- (Equatorial Guinea) Jimmy Bermúdez
- (Equatorial Guinea) Randy
- (Equatorial Guinea) Rincón
- (Equatorial Guinea) Jônatas Obina
- (Ethiopia) Minyahil Teshome
- (Gabon) Rémy Ebanega
- (Gabon) Bruno Ecuele Manga
- (The Gambia) Momodou Ceesay
- (The Gambia) Abdou Jammeh
- (Ghana) Emmanuel Agyemang-Badu
- (Ghana) Jerry Akaminko
- (Ghana) Kwadwo Asamoah
- (Ghana) Christian Atsu
- (Ghana) John Boye
- (Ghana) Mubarak Wakaso
- (Guinea) Alhassane Bangoura
- (Guinea) Abdoul Camara
- (Guinea) Mohammed Diarra
- (Guinea) Seydouba Soumah
- (Ivory Coast) Kolo Touré
- (Kenya) Francis Kahata
- (Kenya) Andrew Murunga
- (Kenya) David Owino
- (Lesotho) Litsepe Marabe
- (Lesotho) Tsepo Lekhoana
- (Lesotho) Tsoanelo Koetle
- (Lesotho) Tsepo Seturumane
- (Liberia) Francis Doe
- (Liberia) Anthony Laffor
- (Liberia) Patrick Wleh
- (Liberia) Marcus Macauley
- (Libya) Hamed Snousi
- (Libya) Faisal Al Badri
- (Malawi) John Banda
- (Malawi) Gabadinho Mhango
- (Malawi) Robin Ngalande
- (Malawi) Robert Ng'ambi
- (Mali) Cheick Diabaté
- (Mali) Modibo Maïga
- (Mali) Abdou Traoré
- (Morocco) Hamza Abourazzouk
- (Morocco) Abdelaziz Barrada
- (Morocco) Younès Belhanda
- (Morocco) Abderrazak Hamdallah
- (Mozambique) Domingues
- (Mozambique) Maninho
- (Namibia) Henrico Botes
- (Namibia) Deon Kavendji
- (Niger) Kamilou Daouda
- (Niger) Mahamane Cissé
- (Niger) Yacouba Ali
- (Nigeria) Azubuike Egwuekwe
- (Nigeria) Ahmed Musa
- (Nigeria) Godfrey Oboabona
- (Nigeria) Nnamdi Oduamadi
- (Nigeria) Emmanuel Emenike
- (Nigeria) Victor Moses
- (Nigeria) Ikechukwu Uche
- (Rwanda) Labama Bokota
- (Senegal) Ibrahima Baldé
- (Senegal) Dame N'Doye
- (Senegal) Moussa Sow
- (Sierra Leone) Moustapha Bangura
- (Sierra Leone) Teteh Bangura
- (Sierra Leone) Samuel Barlay
- (Sierra Leone) Kei Kamara
- (Sierra Leone) Medo Kamara
- (Sierra Leone) Ibrahim Kargbo
- (South Africa) Morgan Gould
- (South Africa) Katlego Mashego
- (South Africa) Thabo Matlaba
- (South Africa) Katlego Mphela
- (South Africa) Siphiwe Tshabalala
- (South Africa) Kermit Erasmus
- (South Africa) Dean Furman
- (Sudan) Bakri Almadina
- (Sudan) Mudather El Tahir
- (Sudan) Salah Ibrahim
- (Sudan) Muhannad El Tahir
- (Sudan) Saif Eldin Ali Idris Farah
- (Tanzania) Shomari Kapombe
- (Tanzania) Erasto Nyoni
- (Togo) Kalen Damessi
- (Togo) Dové Womé
- (Togo) Komlan Amewou
- (Togo) Backer Aloenouvo
- (Tunisia) Fakhreddine Ben Youssef
- (Tunisia) Wahbi Khazri
- (Tunisia) Saber Khelifa
- (Uganda) Godfrey Walusimbi
- (Zambia) Nathan Sinkala
- (Zimbabwe) Lincoln Zvasiya
- (Zimbabwe) Masimba Mambare

1 own goal

- (Egypt) Adam El-Abd (against Guinea)
- (Malawi) Moses Chavula (against Kenya)
- (South Africa) Bernard Parker (against Ethiopia)
- (Togo) Komlan Amewou (against Libya)
