= Tsepo Seturumane =

Mosotho footballer (born 1992)

Personal information
- Full name: Tsepo Seturumane
- Date of birth: 6 July 1992 (age 34)
- Place of birth: Lesotho
- Position: Forward

Team information
- Current team: Lioli

Senior career*
Years	Team	Apps	(Gls)
- Lioli

International career^{‡}
2013–	Lesotho	33	(8)
- * Club domestic league appearances and goals ‡ National team caps and goals as of 8 September 2019

Tsepo Seturumane (born 6 July 1992) is a Mosotho international footballer who plays for Lioli as a striker. He played at the 2014 FIFA World Cup qualification.

== International career ==
=== International goals ===
Scores and results list Lesotho's goal tally first.

No	Date	Venue	Opponent	Score	Result	Competition
1.	11 July 2013	Nkoloma Stadium, Lusaka, Zambia	Swaziland	2–0	2–0	2013 CECAFA Cup
2.	8 September 2013	Al-Hilal Stadium, Omdurman, Sudan	Sudan	1–1	3–1	2014 FIFA World Cup qualification
3.	19 November 2014	Stade d'Angondjé, Libreville, Gabon	Gabon	1–2	2–4	2015 Africa Cup of Nations qualification
4.	19 November 2014	Stade d'Angondjé, Libreville, Gabon	Gabon	2–3	2–4	2015 Africa Cup of Nations qualification
5.	13 October 2015	Setsoto Stadium, Maseru, Lesotho	Comoros	1–0	1–1	2018 FIFA World Cup qualification
6.	18 October 2015	Barbourfields Stadium, Bulawayo, Zimbabwe	Zimbabwe	1–2	1–3	2016 African Nations Championship qualification
7.	28 July 2019	Setsoto Stadium, Maseru, Lesotho	South Africa	1–0	3–2	2020 African Nations Championship qualification
8. (Note: This is credited in certain sources as an own goal by Desta Demu)	8 September 2019	Setsoto Stadium, Maseru, Lesotho	Ethiopia	1–1	1–1	2022 FIFA World Cup qualification
