= Guedes Lupapa =

Angolan footballer

Guedes Lupapa (born 5 March 1988) is an Angolan international footballer who plays as a striker. He played at the 2014 FIFA World Cup qualification.

== International career ==
=== International goals ===
Scores and results list Angola's goal tally first.

No	Date	Venue	Opponent	Score	Result	Competition
1.	31 August 2013	Estádio Nacional de Ombaka, Benguela, Angola	Mozambique	1–0	1–1	2014 African Nations Championship qualification
2.	7 September 2013	Estádio Nacional da Tundavala, Lubango, Angola	Liberia	1–0	4–1	2014 FIFA World Cup qualification
