= Lévy Madinda =

Gabonese footballer

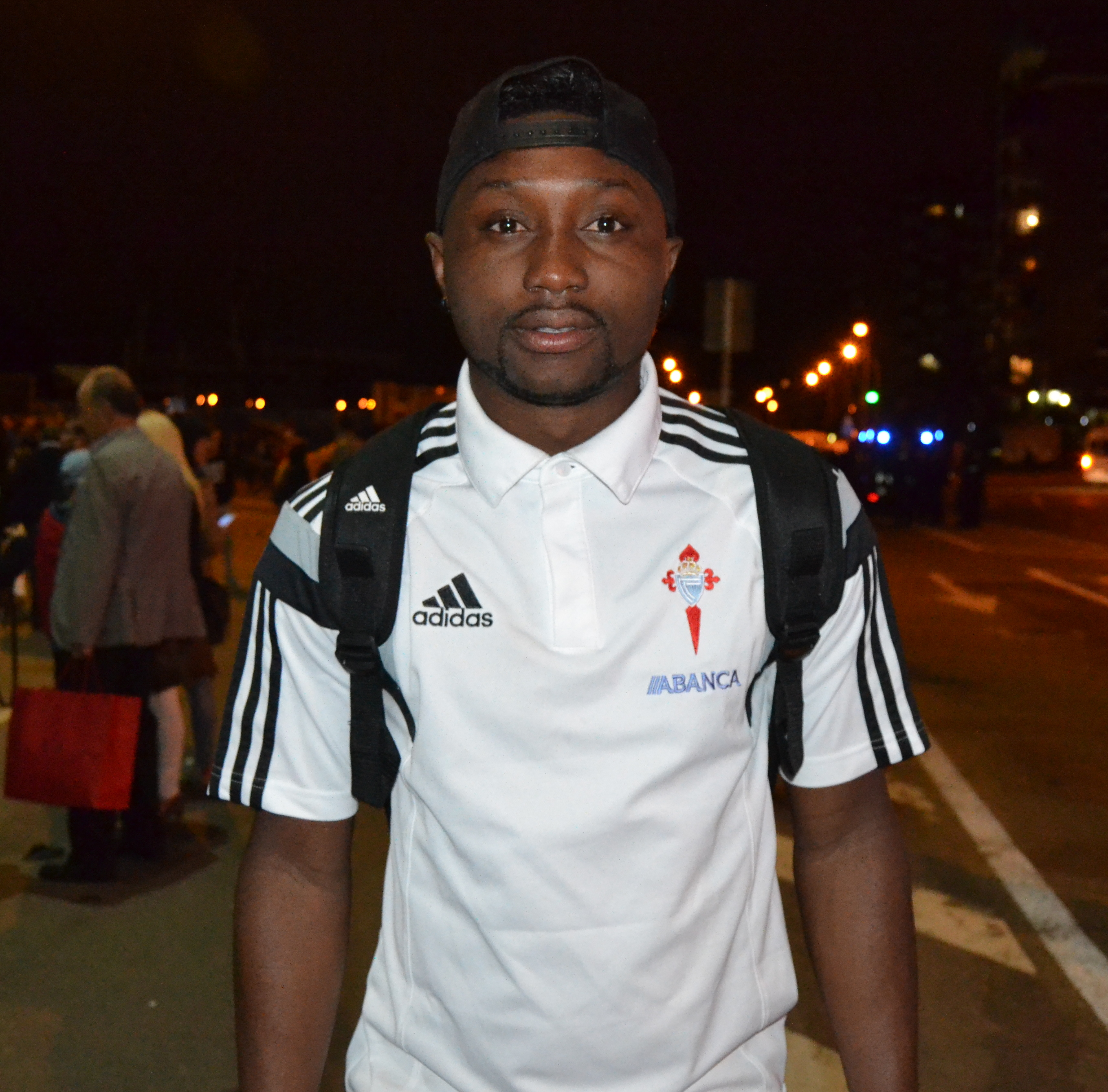
- Madinda in 2015

Personal information
- Full name: Lévy Clément Madinda
- Date of birth: 22 June 1992 (age 34)
- Place of birth: Libreville, Gabon
- Height: 1.82 m (6 ft 0 in)
- Position: Midfielder

Senior career*
Years	Team	Apps	(Gls)
2009–2010	Stade Mandji		
2010–2013	Celta B	55	(3)
2012–2017	Celta	29	(0)
2016–2017	→ Gimnàstic (loan)	49	(1)
2017–2018	Asteras Tripolis	19	(0)
2018–2019	Ümraniyespor	22	(5)
2019–2020	Keçiörengücü	27	(1)
2020–2021	Giresunspor	0	(0)
2021–2022	Sabah	19	(4)
2022–2024	Johor Darul Ta'zim	0	(0)
2022	Johor Darul Ta'zim II	16	(4)
2023	→ Negeri Sembilan (loan)	15	(1)
2023	→ Persib Bandung (loan)	15	(1)
2024–2025	Barito Putera	29	(3)

International career^{‡}
2011–2021	Gabon	56	(6)
- * Club domestic league appearances and goals as of 19:18, 24 May 2025 (UTC) ‡ National team caps and goals as of 16 November 2021

Lévy Clément Madinda (born 22 June 1992) is a Gabonese professional footballer who plays as a midfielder.

== Club career ==
=== Celta ===
Born in Libreville, Madinda started playing football for Stade Mandji. In October 2010, after having been spotted by the club during a youth tournament in Burkina Faso, the 18-year-old moved to Spain and signed a five-year contract with Celta de Vigo, going on to remain several seasons registered for the reserves.

Madinda made his official debut with the Galicians' first team on 31 October 2012, playing the full 90 minutes in a 0–2 away loss against Almería for the season's Copa del Rey. He first appeared in La Liga on 30 March of the following year, coming on as a late substitute in a 2–2 home draw to Barcelona.

On 19 January 2016, Madinda renewed his contract until 2018, being immediately loaned to Gimnàstic de Tarragona until June. On 12 July, his loan was extended for a further season, now with a buyout clause.

=== Asteras Tripoli ===
In June 2017, Madinda left Balaídos to join Greek side Asteras Tripolis.

=== Turkey ===
In September 2020, after leaving Keçiörengücü, he signed for Giresunspor.

=== Malaysia ===
In February 2021, he signed for Malaysian club Sabah. In July 2022, he signed for Malaysian club Johor Darul Ta'zim.

On 16 February 2023, he signed a one-year loan deal with Malaysian club Negeri Sembilan.

=== Indonesia ===
On 21 July 2023, Madinda signed on loan with Indonesian club Persib Bandung until December 2023.

On 28 July 2024, Madinda signed a deal with Barito Putera.

== International career ==
Madinda made his debut for Gabon in 2011, and was selected for the 2012 Africa Cup of Nations squad. On 14 November 2012 he scored his first goal as an international, netting the opener in a 2–2 friendly draw with Portugal played in his hometown, through a penalty kick.

In December 2014, Madinda was named as part of Gabon's provisional squad for the 2015 African Cup of Nations.

=== International goals ===
As of 25 March 2018 (Gabon score listed first, score column indicates score after each Madinda goal)

No	Date	Venue	Opponent	Score	Result	Competition
1.	7 October 2011	Stade Maurice Chevalier, Cannes, France	Equatorial Guinea	2–0	2–0	Friendly
2.	11 November 2012	Stade Omar Bongo, Libreville, Gabon	Portugal	1–0	2–2	Friendly
3.	10 September 2014	Setsoto Stadium, Maseru, Lesotho	Lesotho	1–1	1–1	2015 Africa Cup of Nations qualification
4.	19 November 2014	Stade d'Angondjé, Libreville, Gabon	Lesotho	1–0	4–2	2015 Africa Cup of Nations qualification
5.	12 October 2015	Stade de la Cité de l'Oie, Visé, Belgium	DR Congo	1–1	1–2	Friendly
6.	25 March 2018	Rajamangala National Stadium, Bangkok, Thailand	United Arab Emirates	1–0	1–0	2018 King's Cup

== Honours ==
Gabon

- King's Cup third place: 2018

Gabon U23

- CAF U-23 Championship: 2011
