= Jônatas Obina =

Association football player (born 1985)

Personal information
- Full name: Jônatas Paulino da Silva Inácio
- Date of birth: 18 December 1985 (age 40)
- Place of birth: Sete Lagoas, Brazil
- Height: 1.81 m (5 ft 11 in)
- Position: Forward

Team information
- Current team: Patrocinense
- Number: 19

Youth career
- 2005: Democrata de Sete Lagoas
- 2006: Vila Nova

Senior career*
Years	Team	Apps	(Gls)
2006–2007	→ Barra (loan)		
2008	Formiga		
2008	Tricordiano		
2009	Venda Nova		
2009	América-TO		(13)
2009–2010	Le Mans II		
2010	Caldense		
2010	Tricordiano		
2011	América-TO		
2011–2013	Atlético Mineiro	10	(2)
2012	→ Ipatinga (loan)		
2012	→ Boa (loan)	9	(0)
2013	→ Ferroviária (loan)		
2013	Mixto		
2014	Ferroviária		
2014	São Caetano	1	(0)
2014	Rio Branco-AC	2	(0)
2015	Matonense		
2015	Juventude	11	(1)
2016	Rio Preto		
2016	CSA	15	(4)
2017	Veranópolis		
2017	Rio Preto		
2017	Fluminense Feira	10	(3)
2018	Rio Preto		
2018	América-TO		
2018	Juventus Jaraguá		
2018	Montes Claros		
2019	Rio Preto		
2019	Leones Vegetarianos		
2019	Boston City Brasil	0	(0)
2020	Operário-MS	0	(0)
2021	E.C. Passo Fundo		

International career^{‡}
2013	Equatorial Guinea	4	(1)
- * Club domestic league appearances and goals as of 12 June 2013 ‡ National team caps and goals as of 16 June 2013

Jônatas Paulino da Silva Inácio (born 18 December 1985), known as Jônatas Obina, is a footballer who plays as a forward for Patrocinense. He earned his nickname after physical comparisons with fellow footballer Obina.

Born and raised in Brazil, he has been a member, as a naturalized citizen, of the Equatorial Guinea national team.

== Club career ==
Jônatas Obina started his career at Democrata de Sete Lagoas, where he was discouraged to pursue professional football. After competing in the Copa São Paulo de Futebol Júnior for Vila Nova in January 2006, Jônatas Obina became a professional footballer and played mostly for Minas Gerais based clubs, being Campeonato Mineiro Módulo II's top goalscorer with 13 goals in his first stint with América-TO, thus earning him a move to Le Mans where he played with the reserve team for less than a year.

On his return to América-TO, Jônatas Obina was América's top goalscorer in the 2011 Campeonato Mineiro with 10 goals. Immediately after, he was signed by Clube Atlético Mineiro for 2011 Campeonato Brasileiro Série A. Jônatas made his debut as a second-half substitute in a 0–4 home loss against Internacional on 30 June 2011, scoring his first goal on his second appearance for the club on 10 July against América Mineiro, also scoring on his next match against Santos. He ended the year with 11 appearances for Galo, one of them during 2011 Copa Sudamericana.

The following year, after manager Cuca declared he was not part of the club plans, he was loaned to Ipatinga and later to Boa for 2012 Campeonato Brasileiro Série B.

== International career ==
Jônatas Obina was naturalized Equatoguinean in 2012 and made his official debut in a 2014 FIFA World Cup qualifying match against Cape Verde coming off the bench in a 4–3 win. His second appearance was a lost friendly against Togo. On his next match, also against Cape Verde, he scored his first international goal in a 1–2 loss.

== Career statistics ==
Scores and results list Equatorial Guinea's goal tally first.

#	Date	Venue	Opponent	Score	Result	Competition
1.	8 June 2013	Estádio da Várzea, Praia, Cape Verde	Cape Verde	1–2	0–3; Awarded (Note: FIFA awarded Cape Verde a 3–0 win as a result of Equatorial Guinea fielding the ineligible player Emilio Nsue. The match originally ended 2–1 to Cape Verde.)	2014 FIFA World Cup qualifying match
