= Mamadou Samassa (footballer, born 1986) =

Malian footballer (born 1986)

Personal information
- Full name: Mamadou Samassa
- Date of birth: 1 May 1986 (age 40)
- Place of birth: Montfermeil, France
- Height: 1.88 m (6 ft 2 in)
- Position: Forward

Youth career
- 1996–2003: Red Star
- 2003–2006: Le Mans

Senior career*
Years	Team	Apps	(Gls)
2006–2008	Le Mans	43	(4)
2008–2010	Marseille	20	(3)
2009–2010	→ Valenciennes (loan)	17	(7)
2010–2012	Valenciennes	51	(12)
2012–2014	Chievo	9	(0)
2014	Pescara	1	(0)
2014–2016	Brest	11	(2)
2015	Brest II	2	(0)
2017	T–Team	14	(4)
2018	Madura United	13	(6)
2019	Persipura Jayapura	17	(3)
2020	Blue Boys Muhlenbach	1	(0)
Total		199	(41)

International career
2007–2009	France U21	6	(4)
2009–2013	Mali	20	(6)
- * Club domestic league appearances and goals

Mamadou Samassa (born 1 May 1986) is a former footballer who played as a forward. He primarily played in the lead striker role. Born in France, he is a former French under-21 international, but switched allegiance to Mali, his country of origin.

== Career ==
=== Early career ===
Born in Montfermeil, Seine-Saint-Denis, Samassa began his career as a youth with local amateur outfit Red Star Paris. After spending over seven years in the club's youth system, he joined Le Mans Union Club 72 in the next region over initially as an under-18 player. While in the club's academy, he helped the Le Mans youth side win the 2004 edition of the Coupe Gambardella. Following the 2005–06 season, he signed his first professional contract and was promoted the senior team being assigned the number 19 shirt.

=== Le Mans ===
Samassa made his league debut on the opening match day of the 2006–07 season against Nice starting in a 1–0 victory. In the just the third match of the season, he scored his first career goal as a professional nailing the equaliser in the 53rd minute against Valenciennes. Le Mans later won the match 3–2 with a late goal from another youngster Ismaël Bangoura. Samassa appeared as a starter regularly throughout the season, despite being only 20 years of age. He scored two goals in two matches against Sochaux and also scored against Sedan giving him a total tally of 5 goals for the season. Le Mans won all five matches he scored in.

The next season was projected to be a breakout year for the player, however, in just the fourth match of the season, Samassa was severely injured. He miss four and a half months and returned to the squad on 19 January 2008 in a 1–2 defeat to Bordeaux appearing as a substitute. He made only 16 appearances that season scoring only one goal.

=== Marseille ===
On 25 August 2008, Le Mans president Henri Legarda announced that the club had reached an agreement with Olympique de Marseille for the transfer of Samassa with Legarda stating the southern club had made a "suitable offer". Marseille, who viewed the player as a perfect replacement for Djibril Cissé, signed the player to a five-year deal. Mamadou made his debut for the club on 30 August 2008 in a league match against Sochaux appearing as a substitute in a 2–1 victory. It took him almost four months to score his first goal for the club, which he accomplished against Lille on 30 November in a 2–2 draw. Due to not living up to expectation by some, he was criticized by the local media and supporters alike for his low strike rate, appearing in a total of 32 matches, but scoring only 2 goals.

=== Valenciennes ===
On 4 August 2009, Marseille announced that Samassa would be loaned out to fellow Ligue 1 club Valenciennes for the entire 2009–10 season.

=== Persipura Jayapura ===
In May 2019, he joined Persipura Jayapura.

=== Blue Boys Muhlenbach ===
In January 2020 it was confirmed, that Samassa had moved to FC Blue Boys Muhlenbach in the Luxembourg National Division.

== International career ==
Despite being born to Malian parents, Samassa chose originally to represent France at international level. He made six appearances for the under-21 team scoring 3 goals. On 6 January 2009, he revealed that he will represent Mali at the senior level. He stating he made the decision after traveling to Bamako to meet with national team coach Stephen Keshi. He also stated that the encouragement from fellow Malian Mohammed Sissoko also influenced his decision.

Samassa waited until May before earning his first call up for joint World Cup-Africa Cup of Nations qualifiers against Ghana and Benin that was played on 7 and 21 June. Samassa appeared in neither match and also did not make the substitutes' bench for either.

Samassa made his debut for Mali in a 2010 World Cup qualifier against Benin, where he scored his side's only goal in a 1–1 draw. He scored twice during the 2013 African Cup of Nations, with his first goal coming against DR Congo in a crucial 1-1 draw during the group stage. He then opened the scoreline in the 3-1 third place play-off win against Ghana, which brought Mali bronze medals from the tournament.

=== International goals ===
Scores and results list Mali's goal tally first, score column indicates score after each Samassa goal.

List of international goals scored by Mamadou Samassa
No.	Date	Venue	Opponent	Score	Result	Competition
1.	6 September 2009	Stade de l'Amitié, Cotonou, Benin	Benin	1–0	1–1	2010 FIFA World Cup qualification
2.	13 October 2012	Lobatse Stadium, Lobatse, Botswana	Botswana	3–0	4–1	2013 Africa Cup of Nations qualification
3.	28 January 2013	Moses Mabhida Stadium, Durban, South Africa	DR Congo	1–1	1–1	2013 Africa Cup of Nations
4.	9 February 2013	Nelson Mandela Bay Stadium, Port Elizabeth, South Africa	Ghana	1–0	3–1	2013 Africa Cup of Nations
5.	24 March 2013	Stade Amahoro, Kigali, Rwanda	Rwanda	1–1	2–1	2014 FIFA World Cup qualification
6.	16 June 2013	Stade du 26 Mars, Bamako, Mali	Benin	1–1	2–2	2014 FIFA World Cup qualification

== Honours ==
=== Club ===
Marseille

- Trophée des Champions: 2010

=== International ===
Mali

- Africa Cup of Nations: Bronze medal (2013)
