= 2014 FIFA World Cup qualification (CAF) =

Tournament details
- Dates: 11 November 2011 – 19 November 2013
- Teams: 52 (from 1 confederation)

Tournament statistics
- Matches played: 152
- Goals scored: 389 (2.56 per match)
- Attendance: 2,887,430 (18,996 per match)
- Top scorer(s): (Egypt) Mohamed Aboutrika (Egypt) Mohamed Salah (Ghana) Asamoah Gyan (6 Goals)

The African section of the 2014 FIFA World Cup qualification acted as the qualifiers of the 2014 FIFA World Cup saw 52 teams from the Confederation of African Football (CAF) who competing for 5 spots of the 32 teams in the finals.

== Format ==
Fifty-two out of the 53 national associations affiliated to CAF entered the qualifying to determine the continent's five slots for the next World Cup.

The proposed format, announced on 16 May 2011, began in November 2011 with the first round of 12 two-legged knock-out ties. The ties, involving the 24 lowest-ranked teams according to FIFA World Rankings, were drawn in Brazil on 30 July 2011.

The 12 winners joined the remaining 28 CAF entrants in the second round, which consists of 10 groups of 4. The winners of each group – held between June 2012 and September 2013 – advanced to the third round of 5 two-legged knock-out ties. The 5 winners of these ties – held in October and November 2013 – advanced to the 2014 FIFA World Cup finals.

== Entrants ==
The July 2011 FIFA Ranking were used to seed the teams for the first two rounds, both of which were drawn in Brazil on 30 July 2011. (World rankings shown in brackets)

Bye to second round
(ranked 1st to 28th)
1. Ivory Coast (14)
2. Egypt (34)
3. Ghana (36)
4. Burkina Faso (39)
5. Nigeria (43)
6. Senegal (46)
7. South Africa (49)
8. Cameroon (50)
9. Algeria (52)
10. Tunisia (55)
11. Gabon (60)
12. Libya (63)
12. Morocco (63)
14. Guinea (68)
15. Botswana (71)
16. Malawi (72)
17. Zambia (74)
18. Uganda (76)
19. Mali (77)
20. Cape Verde (82)
21. Benin (86)
21. Zimbabwe (86)
23. Central African Republic (89)
24. Sierra Leone (93)
25. Sudan (97)
26. Niger (98)
27. Angola (100)
28. Gambia (102)
Competing in first round
(ranked 29th to 52nd)
29. Mozambique (103)
30. DR Congo (123)
30. Togo (123)
32. Liberia (125)
33. Tanzania (127)
34. Congo (129)
35. Kenya (130)
36. Rwanda (134)
37. Ethiopia (139)
38. Namibia (140)
39. Burundi (143)
40. Madagascar (149)
41. Guinea-Bissau (151)
42. Equatorial Guinea (155)
43. Chad (158)
44. Swaziland (169)
45. Comoros (175)
46. Lesotho (184)
47. Eritrea (188)
48. Somalia (191)
49. Djibouti (194)
50. Mauritius (195)
51. Seychelles (199)
52. São Tomé and Príncipe (unranked)

Notes

- Mauritania did not participate in the 2014 FIFA World Cup qualifiers.

== First round ==
The first round consisted of 12 home-and-away ties, featured the 24 lowest ranked teams in Africa. The ties were drawn at the World Cup Preliminary Draw at the Marina da Glória in Rio de Janeiro, Brazil, on 30 July 2011. The winners of these series proceeded to the second round.

=== Seeding ===
The July 2011 FIFA Ranking was used to seed the teams.

Pot 1	Pot 2
Mozambique; DR Congo; Togo; Liberia; Tanzania; Congo; Kenya; Rwanda; Ethiopia; Namibia; Burundi; Madagascar	Guinea-Bissau; Equatorial Guinea; Chad; Swaziland; Comoros; Lesotho; Eritrea; Somalia; Djibouti; Mauritius; Seychelles; São Tomé and Príncipe

=== Matches ===
The first legs were scheduled for 11–12 November 2011, with the second legs on 15–16 November 2011.

Team 1	Agg.	Team 2	1st leg	2nd leg
Seychelles	0–7	Kenya	0–3	0–4
Guinea-Bissau	1–2	Togo	1–1	0–1
Djibouti	0–8	Namibia	0–4	0–4
Mauritius	w/o	Liberia	—	—
Comoros	1–5	Mozambique	0–1	1–4
Equatorial Guinea	3–2	Madagascar	2–0	1–2
Somalia	0–5	Ethiopia	0–0	0–5
Lesotho	3–2	Burundi	1–0	2–2
Eritrea	2–4	Rwanda	1–1	1–3
Swaziland	2–8	DR Congo	1–3	1–5
São Tomé and Príncipe	1–6	Congo	0–5	1–1
Chad	2–2 (a)	Tanzania	1–2	1–0

- Note: Mauritius withdrew from the tournament on 31 October 2011. Liberia automatically advanced to the second round.

== Second round ==
The second round saw the top 28 ranked CAF teams joined by the 12 winners from the first round. These teams were drawn into ten groups of four teams at the World Cup Preliminary Draw at the Marina da Glória in Rio de Janeiro, Brazil, on 30 July 2011. The matches were played from 1 June 2012 to 7 September 2013. The top team from each group advanced to the third round.

=== Seeding ===
The July 2011 FIFA Ranking was used to seed the teams.

Pot 1	Pot 2	Pot 3	Pot 4
Ivory Coast; Egypt; Ghana; Burkina Faso; Nigeria; Senegal; South Africa; Cameroon; Algeria; Tunisia	Gabon; Libya; Morocco; Guinea; Botswana; Malawi; Zambia; Uganda; Mali; Cape Verde	Benin; Zimbabwe; Central African Republic; Sierra Leone; Sudan; Niger; Gambia; Angola; Kenya^{†} Togo^{†}	Namibia^{†} Liberia^{†} Mozambique^{†} Equatorial Guinea^{†} Ethiopia^{†} Lesotho^{†} Rwanda^{†} DR Congo^{†} Congo^{†} Tanzania^{†}

^{†} First round winners whose identity was not known at the time of the draw

=== Groups ===
Cameroon were suspended by FIFA on 4 July 2013 for government interference. The suspension was lifted on 22 July 2013.

==== Group A ====
Pos	Team	Pld	W	D	L	GF	GA	GD	Pts	Qualification	Ethiopia national football team	South Africa national soccer team	Botswana national football team	Central African Republic national football team
1	Ethiopia	6	4	1	1	8	6	+2	13	Third round	—	2–1	1–0	2–0
2	South Africa	6	3	2	1	12	5	+7	11		1–1	—	4–1	2–0
3	Botswana	6	2	1	3	8	10	−2	7		3–0 (Note: Awarded)	1–1	—	3–2
4	Central African Republic	6	1	0	5	5	12	−7	3		1–2	0–3	2–0	—

==== Group B ====
Pos	Team	Pld	W	D	L	GF	GA	GD	Pts	Qualification	Tunisia national football team	Cape Verde national football team	Sierra Leone national football team	Equatorial Guinea national football team
1	Tunisia	6	4	2	0	13	6	+7	14	Third round	—	3–0 (Note: Awarded)	2–1	3–1
2	Cape Verde	6	3	0	3	9	7	+2	9		1–2	—	1–0	3–0
3	Sierra Leone	6	2	2	2	10	10	0	8		2–2	2–1	—	3–2
4	Equatorial Guinea	6	0	2	4	6	15	−9	2		1–1	0–3	2–2	—

==== Group C ====
Pos	Team	Pld	W	D	L	GF	GA	GD	Pts	Qualification	Ivory Coast national football team	Morocco national football team	Tanzania national football team	Gambia national football team
1	Ivory Coast	6	4	2	0	15	5	+10	14	Third round	—	1–1	2–0	3–0
2	Morocco	6	2	3	1	9	8	+1	9		2–2	—	2–1	2–0
3	Tanzania	6	2	0	4	8	12	−4	6		2–4	3–1	—	2–1
4	Gambia	6	1	1	4	4	11	−7	4		0–3	1–1	2–0	—

==== Group D ====
Pos	Team	Pld	W	D	L	GF	GA	GD	Pts	Qualification	Ghana national football team	Zambia national football team	Lesotho national football team	Sudan national football team
1	Ghana	6	5	0	1	18	3	+15	15	Third round	—	2–1	7–0	4–0
2	Zambia	6	3	2	1	11	4	+7	11		1–0	—	4–0	1–1
3	Lesotho	6	1	2	3	4	15	−11	5		0–2	1–1	—	0–0
4	Sudan	6	0	2	4	3	14	−11	2		1–3	0–3 (Note: Awarded)	1–3	—

==== Group E ====
Pos	Team	Pld	W	D	L	GF	GA	GD	Pts	Qualification	Burkina Faso national football team	Congo national football team	Gabon national football team	Niger national football team
1	Burkina Faso	6	4	0	2	7	4	+3	12	Third round	—	0–3 (Note: Awarded)	1–0	4–0
2	Congo	6	3	2	1	7	3	+4	11		0–1	—	1–0	1–0
3	Gabon	6	2	1	3	5	6	−1	7		1–0	0–0	—	4–1
4	Niger	6	1	1	4	6	12	−6	4		0–1	2–2	3–0	—

==== Group F ====
Pos	Team	Pld	W	D	L	GF	GA	GD	Pts	Qualification	Nigeria national football team	Malawi national football team	Kenya national football team	Namibia national football team
1	Nigeria	6	3	3	0	7	3	+4	12	Third round	—	2–0	1–1	1–0
2	Malawi	6	1	4	1	4	5	−1	7		1–1	—	2–2	0–0
3	Kenya	6	1	3	2	4	5	−1	6		0–1	0–0	—	1–0
4	Namibia	6	1	2	3	2	4	−2	5		1–1	0–1	1–0	—

==== Group G ====
Pos	Team	Pld	W	D	L	GF	GA	GD	Pts	Qualification	Egypt national football team	Guinea national football team	Mozambique national football team	Zimbabwe national football team
1	Egypt	6	6	0	0	16	7	+9	18	Third round	—	4–2	2–0	2–1
2	Guinea	6	3	1	2	12	8	+4	10		2–3	—	6–1	1–0
3	Mozambique	6	0	3	3	2	10	−8	3		0–1	0–0	—	0–0
4	Zimbabwe	6	0	2	4	4	9	−5	2		2–4	0–1	1–1	—

==== Group H ====
Pos	Team	Pld	W	D	L	GF	GA	GD	Pts	Qualification	Algeria national football team	Mali national football team	Benin national football team	Rwanda national football team
1	Algeria	6	5	0	1	13	4	+9	15	Third round	—	1–0	3–1	4–0
2	Mali	6	2	2	2	7	7	0	8		2–1	—	2–2	1–1
3	Benin	6	2	2	2	8	9	−1	8		1–3	1–0	—	2–0
4	Rwanda	6	0	2	4	3	11	−8	2		0–1	1–2	1–1	—

==== Group I ====
Pos	Team	Pld	W	D	L	GF	GA	GD	Pts	Qualification	Cameroon national football team	Libya national football team	DR Congo national football team	Togo national football team
1	Cameroon	6	4	1	1	8	3	+5	13	Third round	—	1–0	1–0	2–1
2	Libya	6	2	3	1	5	3	+2	9		2–1	—	0–0	2–0
3	DR Congo	6	1	3	2	3	3	0	6		0–0	0–0	—	2–0
4	Togo	6	1	1	4	4	11	−7	4		0–3 (Note: Awarded)	1–1	2–1	—

==== Group J ====
Pos	Team	Pld	W	D	L	GF	GA	GD	Pts	Qualification	Senegal national football team	Uganda national football team	Angola national football team	Liberia national football team
1	Senegal	6	3	3	0	9	4	+5	12	Third round	—	1–0	1–1	3–1
2	Uganda	6	2	2	2	5	6	−1	8		1–1	—	2–1	1–0
3	Angola	6	1	4	1	7	5	+2	7		1–1	1–1	—	3–0 (Note: Awarded)
4	Liberia	6	1	1	4	3	9	−6	4		0–2	2–0	0–0	—

== Third round ==
The third round saw the 10 group winners from the second round drawn into five home and away ties. The winners of each tie advanced to the 2014 FIFA World Cup in Brazil.

=== Seeding ===
The draw of the play-offs was held on 16 September 2013 at the CAF headquarters in Cairo. The teams were seeded based on the September 2013 edition of the FIFA Ranking (shown below in brackets).

Pot 1	Pot 2
Ivory Coast (19); Ghana (24); Algeria (28); Nigeria (36); Tunisia (46)	Egypt (50); Burkina Faso (51); Cameroon (61); Senegal (66); Ethiopia (93)

=== Matches ===
The matches were played in the periods of 11–15 October and 16–19 November 2013.

Team 1	Agg.	Team 2	1st leg	2nd leg
Ivory Coast	4–2	Senegal	3–1	1–1
Ethiopia	1–4	Nigeria	1–2	0–2
Tunisia	1–4	Cameroon	0–0	1–4
Ghana	7–3	Egypt	6–1	1–2
Burkina Faso	3–3 (a)	Algeria	3–2	0–1

== Qualified teams ==
The following five teams from CAF qualified for the final tournament.

Team	Qualified as	Qualified on	Previous appearances in FIFA World Cup^{1}
Ivory Coast	third round winners	16 November 2013	2 (2006, 2010)
Nigeria	third round winners	16 November 2013	4 (1994, 1998, 2002, 2010)
Cameroon	third round winners	17 November 2013	6 (1982, 1990, 1994, 1998, 2002, 2010)
Ghana	third round winners	19 November 2013	2 (2006, 2010)
Algeria	third round winners	19 November 2013	3 (1982, 1986, 2010)

^{1} Bold indicates champions for that year. Italic indicates hosts for that year.

== Top goalscorers ==
There were 389 goals scored in 152 matches, for an average of 2.56 goals per match.

6 goals

- (Egypt) Mohamed Aboutrika
- (Egypt) Mohamed Salah
- (Ghana) Asamoah Gyan

5 goals

- (Algeria) Islam Slimani
- (Ivory Coast) Salomon Kalou
- (Equatorial Guinea) Juvenal
- (Ethiopia) Getaneh Kebede
- (Ethiopia) Saladin Said
- (Senegal) Papiss Cissé
- (South Africa) Bernard Parker

4 goals

- (Democratic Republic of the Congo) Trésor Mputu
- (Ivory Coast) Yaya Touré

Below are full goalscorer lists for each round:

- First round
- Second round
- Third round
