= Malick Evouna =

Gabonese footballer (born 1992)

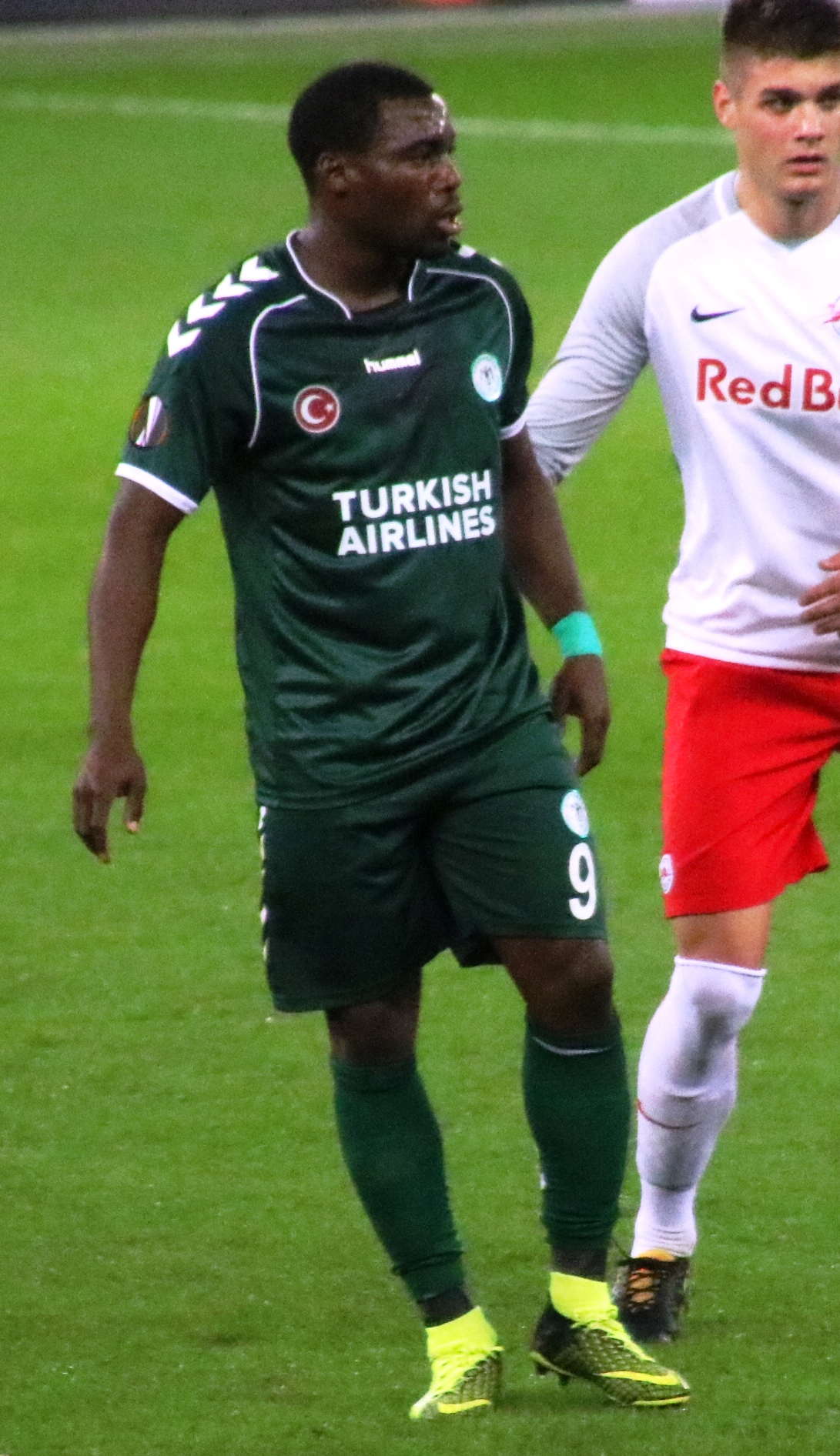
- Evouna with Konyaspor in 2017

Personal information
- Full name: Malick Evouna
- Date of birth: 28 November 1992 (age 33)
- Place of birth: Libreville, Gabon
- Height: 1.85 m (6 ft 1 in)
- Position: Striker

Senior career*
Years	Team	Apps	(Gls)
2009–2012	CMS Libreville		
2012–2013	Mounana	17	(12)
2013–2015	Wydad Casablanca	54	(24)
2015–2016	Al Ahly	24	(12)
2016–2018	Tianjin Teda	10	(3)
2017	→ Konyaspor (loan)	10	(0)
2019–2020	Santa Clara	7	(0)
2020	→ Nacional (loan)	2	(0)
2020–2021	CS Sfaxien	2	(0)
2022	AS Pélican		
2022–2023	Aswan SC	6	(2)
2024–2025	AS Pélican		
2025–	AS Mangasport		

International career^{‡}
2012–	Gabon	37	(12)
- * Club domestic league appearances and goals as of 2 August 2023 ‡ National team caps and goals as of 31 December 2025

Malick Evouna (born 28 November 1992) is a Gabonese professional footballer who plays as a striker.

== Career ==
After scoring twelve goals in 17 matches in the 2012–13 season for CF Mounana, Evouna joined Moroccan side Wydad Casablanca scoring eight goals in his debut season.

On 11 July 2015 it was announced that Evouna joined Al Ahly of Egypt.

On 11 July 2016 Evouna was transferred to Tianjin Teda F.C. of China.

On 26 November 2020 Evouna was transferred to CS Sfaxien of Tunisia.

On 4 July 2022 Evouna returned to Egypt by signing for Aswan SC from his homeland club AS Pélican.

== International career ==
On 9 November 2012, Evouna made his debut for the Gabon national football team against Saudi Arabia. He was included in Gabon's squad for the 2015 Africa Cup of Nations and scored in their opening match against Burkina Faso.

As of June 2016, Evouna has scored 12 goals for Gabon national football team.

== Career statistics ==
=== International ===
As of 31 December 2025

Appearances and goals by national team and year
National team	Year	Apps	Goals
Gabon	2012	1	1
Gabon	2013	1	0
Gabon	2014	7	4
Gabon	2015	12	5
Gabon	2016	6	2
Gabon	2017	6	0
Gabon	2018	0	0
Gabon	2019	1	0
Gabon	2025	3	0
Total		37	12

Scores and results list Gabon's goal tally first, score column indicates score after each Evouna goal.

List of international goals scored by Malick Evouna
No.	Date	Venue	Opponent	Score	Result	Competition
1	11 September 2012	Stade Pierre Brisson, Beauvais, France	Saudi Arabia	1–0	1–0	Friendly
2	5 March 2014	Marrakesh Stadium, Marrakesh, Morocco	Morocco	1–0	1–1	Friendly
3	15 October 2014	Stade du 4 Août, Ouagadougou, Burkina Faso	Burkina Faso	1–1	1–1	2015 Africa Cup of Nations qualification
4	19 November 2014	Stade d'Angondjé, Libreville, Gabon	Lesotho	2–0	4–2	2015 Africa Cup of Nations qualification
5	19 November 2014	Stade d'Angondjé, Libreville, Gabon	Lesotho	4–2	4–2	2015 Africa Cup of Nations qualification
6	17 January 2015	Estadio de Bata, Bata, Equatorial Guinea	Burkina Faso	2–0	2–0	2015 Africa Cup of Nations
7	25 March 2015	Stade Pierre Brisson, Beauvais, France	Mali	1–1	4–3	Friendly
8	5 September 2015	Stade d'Angondjé, Libreville, Gabon	Sudan	1–0	4–0	Friendly
9	5 September 2015	Stade d'Angondjé, Libreville, Gabon	Sudan	3–0	4–0	Friendly
10	14 November 2015	Stade d'Angondjé, Libreville, Gabon	Mozambique	1–0	1–0	2018 FIFA World Cup qualification
11	25 March 2016	Stade de Franceville, Franceville, Gabon	Sierra Leone	2–0	2–1	Friendly
12	4 June 2016	Stade de la Paix, Bouaké, Ivory Coast	Ivory Coast	1–2	1–2	Friendly
