= Mahamadou N'Diaye =

Malian footballer

Mahamadou Ndiaye
Personal information
- Full name: Mahamadou Bamba N'Diaye
- Date of birth: 21 July 1990 (age 36)
- Place of birth: Dakar, Senegal
- Height: 1.85 m (6 ft 1 in)
- Position: Centre back

Team information
- Current team: Éclaron

Youth career
- 2002–2008: Tontien Bamako
- 2009: Wydad Casablanca

Senior career*
Years	Team	Apps	(Gls)
2009–2010	Wydad Casablanca	15	(0)
2010–2013	Vitória S.C.	41	(4)
2013–2017	Troyes	33	(0)
2014–2017	→ Troyes B	11	(0)
2017–2018	Sriwijaya	18	(4)
2018–2019	Bali United	16	(0)
2019–2021	FUS	7	(0)
2021–2023	Créteil	4	(0)
2022	Créteil B	5	(0)
2023–2024	Schiltigheim	7	(1)
2024	Les Mureaux	3	(1)
2024–	Éclaron		

International career
2011–	Mali	20	(3)
- * Club domestic league appearances and goals as of 28 April 2024

Mahamadou Bamba N'Diaye (born 21 July 1990) is a Malian footballer who plays for French amateur side Éclaron.

== Career ==
Born in Dakar, Senegal, N'Diaye began his career with Tontien Bamako and signed in February 2009 for Wydad Casablanca.

In 2010, he signed with Vitória de Guimarães.

In November 2021, he joined Créteil in the French third-tier Championnat National.

== International goals ==
#	Date	Venue	Opponent	Score	Result	Competition
1.	10 June 2012	Stade du 4-Août, Ouagadougou, Burkina Faso	Algeria	1–1	2–1	2014 FIFA World Cup qualification
2.	8 September 2012	Stade du 26 Mars, Bamako, Mali	Botswana	2–0	3–0	2013 Africa Cup of Nations qualification
3.	9 June 2013	Stade du 26 Mars, Bamako, Mali	Rwanda	1–1	1–1	2014 FIFA World Cup qualification

== Honours ==
Wydad Casablanca

- Botola: 2009–10

Vitória Guimarães

- Portuguese Cup: 2012–13

Sriwijaya

- East Kalimantan Governor Cup: 2018

Mali

- Africa Cup of Nations bronze: 2012, 2013
