= James Akaminko =

Ghanaian footballer

Personal information
- Date of birth: 16 September 1995 (age 31)
- Place of birth: Accra, Ghana
- Position: Midfielder

Team information
- Current team: Azam FC

Senior career*
Years	Team	Apps	(Gls)
2011–2012	Pure Joy Stars		
2012–2015	Tema Youth		
2016	Medeama		
2017	Tema Youth	27	(2)
2018–2020	Ashanti Gold	36	(1)
2020–2022	Accra Great Olympics	44	(2)
2022–	Azam FC		

International career
2019	Ghana	1	(0)
- * Club domestic league appearances and goals

James Akaminko (born 16 September 1995) is a Ghanaian footballer who plays as a midfielder for Tanzanian club Azam FC.

== Career ==
Akaminko joined Tanzanian club Azam FC in July 2022.

== Personal life ==
Akaminko's brother Jerry has also played football professionally.

== See also ==
- Football in Ghana
