= Morgan Gould =

South African soccer player (born 1983)

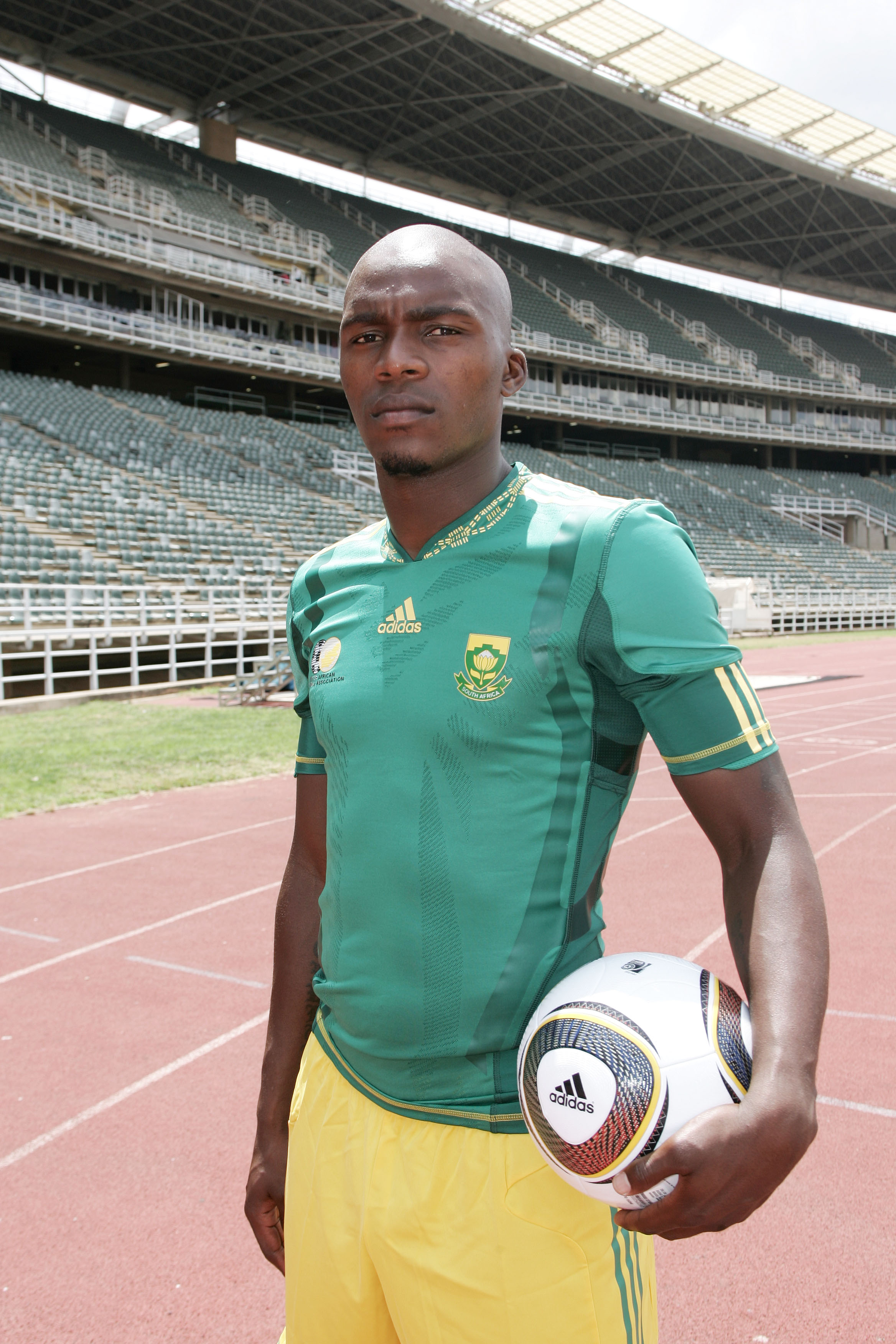
- Gould with South Africa in 2010

Personal information
- Full name: Morgan Leonard Gould
- Date of birth: 23 March 1983 (age 43)
- Place of birth: Soweto, South Africa
- Height: 1.86 m (6 ft 1 in)
- Position: Centre-back

Team information
- Current team: Sekhukhune United

Youth career
- Noordgesig Sundowns
- Wits juniors
- Bedfordview Country Club

Senior career*
Years	Team	Apps	(Gls)
2001–2008	Jomo Cosmos	81	(0)
2008–2012	Supersport United	99	(15)
2012–2016	Kaizer Chiefs	39	(0)
2016–2019	Supersport United	56	(4)
2019–2020	Stellenbosch	11	(0)
2020–	Sekhukhune United	15	(0)

International career
2008–2017	South Africa	31	(1)
- * Club domestic league appearances and goals as of 13:51, 26 September 2022 (UTC)

Morgan Leonard Gould (born 23 March 1983) is a South African professional soccer player who plays for Sekhukhune United as a centre-back. He made 31 appearances for the South Africa national team, scoring twice.

== Club career ==
Born in Soweto, Gould began his senior career with Jomo Cosmos in 2001, before moving to Supersport United in 2008. He signed for Kaizer Chiefs in May 2012.

=== Kaizer Chiefs ===
Gould was signed to Chiefs in July 2012 for R8.4million. He made his debut on 5 August 2012 against Mamelodi Sundowns losing 4–1. He scored his first goal against student outfit Bidvest Wits in the Nedbank Cup winning 3–0 with him scoring the second goal in 49th from a header from the near post. In the first half Siboniso Gaxa also scored his first goal for Chiefs. Earlier that day Orlando Pirates lost 4–1 to SAFA Second Division student outfit, Maluti FET College. He went to play only nine games and 721 minutes in the 2012–13 season due to an achilles tendon surgery and a knee injury only recovering in pre-season.

=== Supersport United ===
In July 2016, Gould made his return to Supersport United, to be reunited with his former Kaizer Chiefs coach Stuart Baxter. He made his first start in a league match of the PSL Absa Premiership 2016–2017 season, in a 1–0 loss to Platinum Stars.

== International career ==
Gould made his international debut for South Africa in 2008, and was a squad member at the 2009 FIFA Confederations Cup.

== Personal life ==
He is the son of late former Kaizer Chiefs and Penarol player Goodenough Nkomo.

== Career statistics ==
Scores and results list South Africa's goal tally first.

No	Date	Venue	Opponent	Score	Result	Competition
1.	9 June 2012	University of Botswana Stadium, Gaborone, Botswana	Botswana	1–0	1–1	2014 FIFA World Cup qualification
