= Jerry Akaminko =

Ghanaian footballer (born 1988)

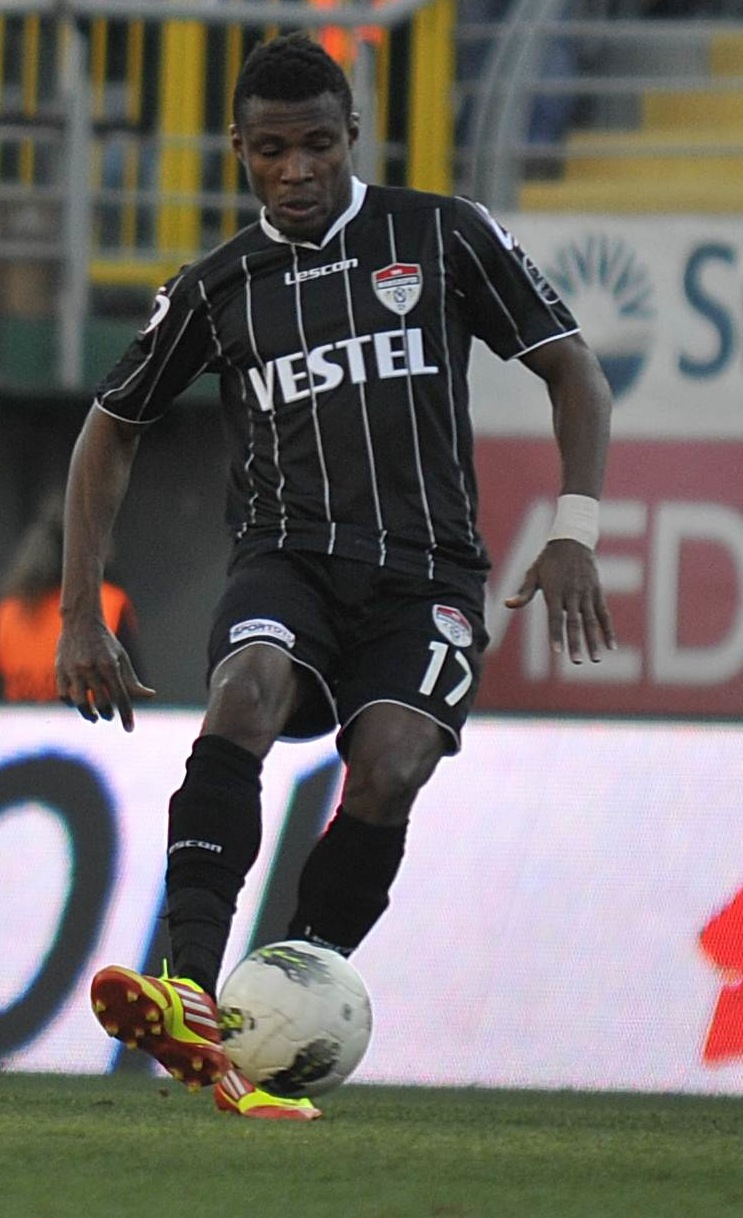

Personal information
- Full name: Jeremiah Akaminko
- Date of birth: 2 May 1988 (age 38)
- Place of birth: Accra, Greater Accra, Ghana
- Height: 1.83 m (6 ft 0 in)
- Position: Centre-back

Team information
- Current team: Persik Kediri
- Number: 17

Youth career
- –2004: Heart of Lions

Senior career*
Years	Team	Apps	(Gls)
2005–2008	Heart of Lions	53	(4)
2008–2011	Orduspor	81	(3)
2011–2012	Manisaspor	27	(0)
2012–2018	Eskişehirspor	106	(1)
2018–2019	İstanbulspor	6	(0)
2020–	Persik Kediri	0	(0)

International career^{‡}
2012–	Ghana	10	(1)
- * Club domestic league appearances and goals as of 21:46, 16 May 2019 (UTC) ‡ National team caps and goals as of 2 May 2017

Jeremiah Akaminko (born 2 May 1988) is a Ghanaian professional footballer who plays as a centre-back for the Ghana national team playing for Liga 1 Team Persik Kediri.

== Club career ==
On 25 August 2008, Akaminko signed with Süper Lig side Orduspor from Heart of Lions on a two-year contract with the side. He was nominated as Defender of the Year 2008 in Ghana. Akaminko's contract was subject to renewal after the initial two years and played his first match on 7 September 2008 against Boluspor. There had been reports that the Heart of Lions captain was on the verge of joining Israeli league club Maccabi Tel Aviv. He is noted for his aggressive style of play.

Akaminko left İstanbulspor on 31 January 2019.

== International career ==
Akaminko made his debut and scored his first goal with the Ghana national team on June 1, 2012, in a 2014 FIFA World Cup qualification at the Kumasi Sports Stadium.

== Personal life ==
Akaminko's brother James has also played football professionally.

== Career statistics ==
Appearances for Ghana
Year	Apps	Goals
2012	3	1
2013	2	0
Total	5	1
Correct as of 13 January 2013

Goals for Ghana
#	Date	Venue	Opponent	Score	Result	Competition
1.	1 June 2012	Kumasi Sports Stadium, Kumasi, Ghana	Lesotho	7–0	7–0	2014 FIFA World Cup qualification
Correct as of 1 June 2012

== See also ==
- Football in Ghana
