= Rincón (footballer, born 1980) =

Footballer (1980–2013)

Personal information
- Full name: Claudiney Ramos
- Date of birth: 15 March 1980
- Place of birth: Porecatu, Paraná, Brazil
- Date of death: 8 July 2013 (aged 33)
- Place of death: Sorocaba, São Paulo, Brazil
- Height: 1.81 m (5 ft 11 in)
- Position: Defensive midfielder

Senior career*
Years	Team	Apps	(Gls)
2004	Grêmio Barueri		
2004–2005	Taubaté		
2005	Ceilândia		
2006	Santo André	4	(0)
2007	Paulista	11	(0)
2008–2009	Guarani	26	(4)
2009–2010	São Bernardo		
2010	ASA	32	(4)
2011	Macaé	6	(0)
2012	União São João		
2012	Capivariano		
2012	Itabaiana	2	(0)
2013	Avenida		

International career^{‡}
2012–2013	Equatorial Guinea	2	(0)
- * Club domestic league appearances and goals ‡ National team caps and goals as of 16 June 2013

Claudiney Ramos (15 March 1980 – 8 July 2013) was a professional footballer who played as a defensive midfielder. He was nicknamed Rincón, because of his physical resemblance to former Corinthians player, Colombian Freddy Rincón. Born in Brazil, he capped for the Equatorial Guinea national team.

== International career ==
Rincón was part of a lot of Brazilian players that the Ministry of Sports of Equatorial Guinea had naturalized (purchased) in September 2012 to strengthen its national team and try to trace the tie 0–4 for the 2013 Africa Cup of Nations against Congo DR. Then, he made his debut for Equatorial Guinea on 14 October 2012 in the return match versus Congo DR. The game was won by 2–1, but it wasn't enough to qualify for the competition. In March the following year, Rincón scored the winning goal in a 2014 FIFA World Cup qualifying match against Cape Verde, being that his greatest moment of international notoriety, which lost all its value posthumously. Eleven days after his death, FIFA awarded the points of the match to Cape Verde, considering that his teammate Emilio Nsue was not regularized.

== Death ==
Rincón had represented Equatorial Guinea in June 2013, playing three matches (two FIFA World Cup qualifiers and one friendly) between days 5 and 16. During that trip, he contracted malaria but felt symptoms only three weeks later, in Brazil. He was hospitalized in Sorocaba Hospital, where he died on the morning of July 8. Rincón was 33 and at the time of his death, he was under contract with EC Avenida.
