= Tšepo Lekhoana =

Mosotho footballer

Personal information
- Place of birth: Lesotho
- Position: Striker

Team information
- Current team: Likhopo Maseru

Senior career*
Years	Team	Apps	(Gls)
2008–	Likhopo Maseru		

International career^{‡}
2008–	Lesotho	11	(2)
- * Club domestic league appearances and goals ‡ National team caps and goals as of 8 September 2013

Tšepo Lekhoana is a Mosotho footballer who currently plays as a striker for Likhopo Maseru. Since 2008, he has won five caps for the Lesotho national football team.
