= Kalen Damessi =

Togolese footballer (born 1990)

Personal information
- Date of birth: 28 March 1990 (age 36)
- Place of birth: Abidjan, Ivory Coast
- Height: 1.84 m (6 ft 0 in)
- Position: Forward

Team information
- Current team: Stade Poitevin FC

Senior career*
Years	Team	Apps	(Gls)
2007–2010	Toulouse B	12	(2)
2010–2011	Jura Sud	17	(8)
2011–2015	Lille B	74	(25)
2015	Quevilly-Rouen	5	(0)
2016–2019	Concarneau	72	(15)
2017–2018	Concarneau B	6	(1)
2019–2020	Sedan	6	(1)
2020–	Stade Poitevin FC	2	(0)

International career^{‡}
2012–	Togo	7	(1)
- * Club domestic league appearances and goals as of 20:56, 15 February 2021 (UTC) ‡ National team caps and goals as of 16:16, 24 October 2019 (UTC)

Kalen Damessi (born 28 March 1990) is a Togolese professional footballer who plays as a forward for Championnat National 3 club Stade Poitevin FC.

== Career ==
Born in Abidjan, Ivory Coast, Damessi has played for Toulouse B, Jura Sud, Lille B, Quevilly-Rouen, Concarneau, Concarneau B, Sedan and Stade Poitevin FC.

He made his international debut for Togo in 2012.
