= 2015 Africa Cup of Nations qualification Group C =

Football tournament qualification stage

Group C of the 2015 Africa Cup of Nations qualification tournament was one of the seven groups to decide the teams which qualified for the 2015 Africa Cup of Nations finals tournament. Group C consisted of four teams: Gabon, Burkina Faso, Angola, and Lesotho, who played against each other home-and-away in a round-robin format.

== Standings ==
Team	Pld	W	D	L	GF	GA	GD	Pts	GAB	BFA	ANG	LES
Gabon	6	3	3	0	9	4	+5	12		2–0	1–0	4–2
Burkina Faso	6	3	2	1	8	4	+4	11	1–1		1–1	2–0
Angola	6	1	3	2	5	5	0	6	0–0	0–3		4–0
Lesotho	6	0	2	4	3	12	−9	2	1–1	0–1	0–0	

== Matches ==
6 September 2014
16:00 UTC±0

Burkina Faso	2–0	Lesotho
Pitroipa 11'; Al. Traoré 49'	Report

Stade du 4-Août, Ouagadougou
Referee: Hudu Munyemana (Rwanda)
6 September 2014
17:00 UTC+1

Gabon	1–0	Angola
Mbingui 44'	Report

Stade d'Angondjé, Libreville
Referee: Mahamadou Keita (Mali)

10 September 2014
17:00 UTC+1

Angola	0–3	Burkina Faso
	Report	Bancé 43'; Pitroipa 49', 58'

Estádio 11 de Novembro, Luanda
Referee: Victor Gomes (South Africa)
10 September 2014
19:00 UTC+2

Lesotho	1–1	Gabon
Lekhanya 60'	Report	Madinda 79'

Setsoto Stadium, Maseru
Referee: Hamada Nampiandraza (Madagascar)

10 October 2014
19:30 UTC+2

Lesotho	0–0	Angola
	Report

Setsoto Stadium, Maseru
Referee: Kokou Fagla (Togo)
11 October 2014
18:30 UTC+1

Gabon	2–0	Burkina Faso
Aubameyang 68', 74'	Report

Stade d'Angondjé, Libreville
Referee: Joseph Lamptey (Ghana)

15 October 2014
17:00 UTC+1

Angola	4–0	Lesotho
Bastos 2'; Ary Papel 32'; Koetle 47' (o.g.); Love 68'	Report

Estádio 11 de Novembro, Luanda
Referee: Ali Adelaïd (Comoros)
15 October 2014
18:00 UTC±0

Burkina Faso	1–1	Gabon
Pitroipa 30'	Report	Evouna 77'

Stade du 4-Août, Ouagadougou
Referee: Joshua Bondo (Botswana)

15 November 2014
16:00 UTC+2

Lesotho	0–1	Burkina Faso
	Report	Pitroipa 1'

Setsoto Stadium, Maseru
Referee: Thierry Nkurunziza (Burundi)
15 November 2014
16:00 UTC+1

Angola	0–0	Gabon
	Report

Estádio 11 de Novembro, Luanda
Referee: Tessema Bamlak (Ethiopia)

19 November 2014
18:00 UTC±0

Burkina Faso	1–1	Angola
Pitroipa 45' (pen.)	Report	Djalma 28' (pen.)

Stade du 4-Août, Ouagadougou
Referee: Youssef Essrayri (Tunisia)
19 November 2014
19:00 UTC+1

Gabon	4–2	Lesotho
Madinda 41'; Evouna 52', 81'; Obiang 68'	Report	Seturumane 56', 75'

Stade d'Angondjé, Libreville
Referee: Denis Batte (Uganda)

== Goalscorers ==
6 goals

- (Burkina Faso) Jonathan Pitroipa

3 goals

- (Gabon) Malick Evouna
- (Gabon) Lévy Madinda

2 goals

- (Gabon) Pierre-Emerick Aubameyang
- (Lesotho) Tsepo Seturumane

1 goal

- (Angola) Ary Papel
- (Angola) Bastos
- (Angola) Djalma
- (Angola) Love
- (Burkina Faso) Aristide Bancé
- (Burkina Faso) Alain Traoré
- (Gabon) Samson Mbingui
- (Gabon) Johann Obiang
- (Lesotho) Emmanuel Lekhanya

1 own goal

- (Lesotho) Tšoanelo Koetle
