= 2014 FIFA World Cup qualification – CAF third round =

This page provides summaries of the CAF third round matches for the 2014 FIFA World Cup qualification. The ten group winners from the second round were drawn into five home-and-away ties.

Algeria, Cameroon, Ghana, Ivory Coast, and Nigeria won their respective ties and qualified for the 2014 FIFA World Cup; the same five African teams had also previously earned qualification for the 2010 World Cup.

== Seeding ==
The teams were seeded based on the 12 September 2013 edition of the FIFA World Rankings (shown below, with their second round groups in small brackets).

Note: Bolded teams qualified for the World Cup.

Pot 1	Pot 2
**Ivory Coast** (19) (Group C); **Ghana** (24) (Group D); **Algeria** (28) (Group H); **Nigeria** (36) (Group F); Tunisia (46) (Group B)	Egypt (50) (Group G); Burkina Faso (51) (Group E); **Cameroon** (61) (Group I); Senegal (66) (Group J); Ethiopia (93) (Group A)

== Matches ==
The draw of the play-offs was held on 16 September 2013 in Giza, Egypt. The matches were played from 11–15 October, and 15–19 November 2013.

Tie-break criteria

If teams were tied after the two-match series (on basis of results, goals scored, away goals), then a Cup System took effect.

Knockout format:

After the conclusion of the second match (i.e. 90 minutes of regulatory time), 30 minutes of extra time would be played (two halves of 15 minutes each).

- a) The team scoring the greater number of goals advanced.
- b) If both teams scored the same number of goals, then the team that scored more away goals advanced.

If no goals were scored in extra time, then the tie was decided by a penalty shoot-out, as described in the Laws of the Game.

Team 1	Agg.	Team 2	1st leg	2nd leg
**Ivory Coast**	4–2	Senegal	3–1	1–1
Ethiopia	1–4	**Nigeria**	1–2	0–2
Tunisia	1–4	**Cameroon**	0–0	1–4
**Ghana**	7–3	Egypt	6–1	1–2
Burkina Faso	3–3 (a)	**Algeria**	3–2	0–1

12 October 2013
17:00 UTC±0

Ivory Coast	3–1	Senegal
Drogba 3' (pen.); L. Sané 14' (o.g.); Kalou 49'	Report	P. Cissé 90+4'

Stade Félix Houphouët-Boigny, Abidjan
Attendance: 30,000
Referee: Rajindraparsad Seechurn (Mauritius)
16 November 2013
19:00 UTC±0

Senegal	1–1	Ivory Coast
Sow 72' (pen.)	Report	Kalou 90+4'

Stade Mohamed V, Casablanca (Morocco) (Note: Senegal had to play their home match in the third round at a neutral venue, due to a one-year ban from playing at their home stadium imposed by the CAF following riots in their 2013 Africa Cup of Nations qualification match against Ivory Coast.)
Attendance: 15,000
Referee: Djamel Haimoudi (Algeria)

Ivory Coast won 4–2 on aggregate and qualified for the 2014 FIFA World Cup.

13 October 2013
16:00 UTC+3

Ethiopia	1–2	Nigeria
Assefa 57'	Report	Emenike 67', 90' (pen.)

Addis Ababa Stadium, Addis Ababa
Attendance: 22,000
Referee: Néant Alioum (Cameroon)
16 November 2013
16:00 UTC+1

Nigeria	2–0	Ethiopia
Moses 20' (pen.); Obinna 81'	Report

U. J. Esuene Stadium, Calabar
Attendance: 8,000
Referee: Bakary Gassama (Gambia)

Nigeria won 4–1 on aggregate and qualified for the 2014 FIFA World Cup.

13 October 2013
18:00 UTC+1

Tunisia	0–0	Cameroon
	Report

Stade Olympique de Radès, Tunis
Attendance: 50,000
Referee: Koman Coulibaly (Mali)
17 November 2013
15:00 UTC+1

Cameroon	4–1	Tunisia
Webó 3'; Moukandjo 29'; Makoun 65', 85'	Report	Akaïchi 50'

Ahmadou Ahidjo Stadium, Yaoundé
Attendance: 35,570
Referee: Rajindraparsad Seechurn (Mauritius)

Cameroon won 4–1 on aggregate and qualified for the 2014 FIFA World Cup.

15 October 2013
16:00 UTC±0

Ghana	6–1	Egypt
Gyan 5', 53'; Gomaa 23' (o.g.); Waris 44'; Muntari 72' (pen.); Atsu 88'	Report	Aboutrika 41' (pen.)

Baba Yara Stadium, Kumasi
Attendance: 38,000
Referee: Bouchaïb El Ahrach (Morocco)
19 November 2013
18:00 UTC+2

Egypt	2–1	Ghana
Zaki 25'; Gedo 83'	Report	Boateng 88'

30 June Stadium, Cairo
Attendance: 25,000
Referee: Noumandiez Doué (Ivory Coast)

Ghana won 7–3 on aggregate and qualified for the 2014 FIFA World Cup.

12 October 2013
16:00 UTC±0

Burkina Faso	3–2	Algeria
Pitroipa 45+2'; D. Koné 65'; Bancé 86' (pen.)	Report	Feghouli 50'; Medjani 68'

Stade du 4-Août, Ouagadougou
Attendance: 31,000
Referee: Janny Sikazwe (Zambia)
19 November 2013
19:15 UTC+1

Algeria	1–0	Burkina Faso
Bougherra 49'	Report

Stade Mustapha Tchaker, Blida
Attendance: 35,000
Referee: Badara Diatta (Senegal)

3–3 on aggregate. Algeria won on the away goals rule and qualified for the 2014 FIFA World Cup.

Burkina Faso's protest that Algeria goalscorer Madjid Bougherra was ineligible to play in qualification was thrown out by FIFA.

== Goalscorers ==
There were 32 goals scored in 10 matches, for an average of 3.2 goals per match.

2 goals

- (Cameroon) Jean Makoun
- (Ghana) Asamoah Gyan
- (Ivory Coast) Salomon Kalou
- (Nigeria) Emmanuel Emenike

1 goal

- (Algeria) Madjid Bougherra
- (Algeria) Sofiane Feghouli
- (Algeria) Carl Medjani
- (Burkina Faso) Aristide Bancé
- (Burkina Faso) Djakaridja Koné
- (Burkina Faso) Jonathan Pitroipa
- (Cameroon) Pierre Webó
- (Cameroon) Benjamin Moukandjo
- (Egypt) Mohamed Aboutrika
- (Egypt) Mohamed Nagy Gedo
- (Egypt) Amr Zaki
- (Ethiopia) Behailu Assefa
- (Ghana) Kevin-Prince Boateng
- (Ghana) Abdul Majeed Waris
- (Ghana) Sulley Muntari
- (Ghana) Christian Atsu
- (Ivory Coast) Didier Drogba
- (Nigeria) Victor Moses
- (Nigeria) Victor Obinna
- (Senegal) Papiss Cissé
- (Senegal) Moussa Sow
- (Tunisia) Ahmed Akaïchi

1 own goal

- (Egypt) Wael Gomaa (against Ghana)
- (Senegal) Ludovic Sané (against Ivory Coast)
