= Juvenal Edjogo-Owono =

Equatoguinean football player and manager

Juvenal Edjogo Owono
Personal information
- Full name: Juvenal Edjogo Owono Montalbán
- Date of birth: 3 April 1979 (age 47)
- Place of birth: Sabadell, Spain
- Height: 1.77 m (5 ft 10 in)
- Position: Midfielder

Youth career
- Can Rull
- Sabadell
- Espanyol

Senior career*
| Years | Team | Apps | (Gls) |
| 1998–1999 | Vilassar Mar | | |
| 1999–2003 | Espanyol B | 85 | (15) |
| 2001–2002 | → Levante (loan) | 19 | (0) |
| 2003–2004 | Racing Santander | 0 | (0) |
| 2004 | Castellón | 17 | (5) |
| 2004–2005 | Alavés | 19 | (0) |
| 2005–2007 | Recreativo | 26 | (1) |
| 2007 | Tenerife | 13 | (2) |
| 2007–2008 | Cartagena | 29 | (2) |
| 2008–2013 | Sabadell | 157 | (19) |
| 2013–2014 | Cornellà | 15 | (1) |
| 2014–2016 | Santa Coloma | | |
| 2016–2017 | Joventut Ribetana | | |
| Total | | 380 | (45) |

International career
| 2003–2015 | Equatorial Guinea | 39 | (8) |

Managerial career
- 2023–2024: Porcinos FC (KL)
- * Club domestic league appearances and goals

Juvenal Edjogo Owono Montalbán (born 3 April 1979), known mononymously as Juvenal, is a football manager and former professional player who operated as a midfielder. Bor in Spain, he capped for the Equatorial Guinea national team.

== Club career ==
Born in Sabadell, Barcelona, Catalonia, to an Equatoguinean father and a Spanish mother, Edjogo Owono played in the lower leagues in four of his first five years as a senior, including three with RCD Espanyol's reserves, who loaned him to Levante UD in 2001 for his first professional experience (Segunda División). In the 2003–04 season he was part of Racing de Santander's La Liga roster, but did not appear in the competition for the Cantabrians, being released in the January transfer window.

In the following two seasons, Edjogo Owono played in the second level, achieving top-flight promotions with both Deportivo Alavés and Recreativo de Huelva. In the 2006–07 campaign he failed that objective with CD Tenerife, also appearing in less than one half of the league games.

In the summer of 2008, after one season in Segunda División B with FC Cartagena, the 29-year-old Edjogo Owono returned to his hometown and signed for CE Sabadell FC, contributing with 34 appearances and five goals in his third year as the Arlequinats returned to the second tier after an absence of 18 years.

== International career ==
Edjogo Owono qualified for Equatorial Guinea because of his father, born in Niefang – his mother hailed from Granada, Andalusia. He made his debut for the national team in 2003 and, between that year and 2008, appeared in eight FIFA World Cup qualification matches, scoring on 7 June 2008 in a 1–4 away defeat against South Africa for the 2010 edition.

In late 2007, Edjogo Owono played in unofficial games against the Region of Murcia and Extremadura. Two months before his 36th birthday, and immediately after the 2015 Africa Cup of Nations, he retired from international football.

== Personal life ==
Edjogo Owono's younger brothers, Alberto and José, are also former footballers. They competed exclusively in the Spanish lower leagues or amateur championships.

Edjogo Owono criticised voting system Ballon d'Or what was later etched by some media outles

== Career statistics ==
=== Club ===
Appearances and goals by club, season and competition
| Club | Season | League | | | Cup | | Other | | Total | |
| Club | Season | Division | Apps | Goals | Apps | Goals | Apps | Goals | Apps | Goals |
|---|---|---|---|---|---|---|---|---|---|---|
| Levante | 2001–02 | Segunda División | 19 | 0 | 1 | 0 | — | | 20 | 0 |
| Racing Santander | 2003–04 | Segunda División | 0 | 0 | 0 | 0 | 2 (Note: Appearances in UEFA Intertoto Cup) | 0 | 2 | 0 |
| Castellón | 2003–04 | Segunda División B | 13 | 4 | 0 | 0 | 4 (Note: Appearances in Promotion Play-offs) | 1 | 17 | 5 |
| Alavés | 2004–05 | Segunda División | 19 | 0 | 0 | 0 | — | | 19 | 0 |
| Recreativo | 2005–06 | Segunda División | 26 | 1 | 1 | 0 | — | | 27 | 1 |
| Recreativo | 2006–07 | La Liga | 0 | 0 | 0 | 0 | — | | 0 | 0 |
| Recreativo | Total | | 26 | 1 | 1 | 0 | — | | 27 | 1 |
| Tenerife | 2006–07 | Segunda División | 13 | 2 | 0 | 0 | — | | 13 | 2 |
| Cartagena | 2007–08 | Segunda División | 29 | 2 | 1 | 1 | — | | 30 | 3 |
| Sabadell | 2008–09 | Segunda División B | 36 | 5 | 0 | 0 | 3 | 0 | 39 | 5 |
| Sabadell | 2009–10 | Segunda División B | 32 | 5 | 2 | 0 | — | | 34 | 5 |
| Sabadell | 2010–11 | Segunda División B | 34 | 5 | 0 | 0 | 1 | 0 | 35 | 5 |
| Sabadell | 2011–12 | Segunda División | 27 | 4 | 1 | 0 | — | | 28 | 4 |
| Sabadell | 2012–13 | Segunda División | 24 | 0 | 0 | 0 | — | | 24 | 0 |
| Sabadell | Total | | 153 | 19 | 3 | 0 | 4 | 0 | 160 | 19 |
| Cornellà | 2013–14 | Tercera División | 15 | 1 | | | — | | 15 | 1 |
| Santa Coloma | 2014–15 | Primera Divisió | 16 | 0 | 3 | 1 | 4 (Note: Appearances in UEFA Champions League) | 0 | 23 | 1 |
| Career total | | | 303 | 29 | 9 | 2 | 14 | 1 | 330 | 32 |

=== International ===
Scores and results list Equatorial Guinea's goal tally first, score column indicates score after each Edjogo Owono's goal.

List of international goals scored by Juvenal Edjogo-Owono
| No. | Date | Venue | Opponent | Score | Result | Competition |
|---|---|---|---|---|---|---|
| 1 | 25 March 2007 | Estadio Internacional, Malabo, Equatorial Guinea | Rwanda | 2–0 | 3–1 | 2008 Africa Cup of Nations qualification |
| 2 | 9 September 2007 | Estadio de Malabo, Malabo, Equatorial Guinea | Cameroon | 1–0 | 1–0 | 2008 Africa Cup of Nations qualification |
| 3 | 7 June 2008 | Super Stadium, Pretoria, South Africa | South Africa | 1–4 | 1–4 | 2010 FIFA World Cup qualification |
| 4 | 11 November 2012 | Estadio de Malabo, Malabo, Equatorial Guinea | Madagascar | 1–0 | 2–0 | 2014 FIFA World Cup qualification |
| 5 | 9 June 2012 | Estadio de Malabo, Malabo, Equatorial Guinea | Sierra Leone | 1–0 | 2–2 | 2014 FIFA World Cup qualification |
| 6 | 9 June 2012 | Estadio de Malabo, Malabo, Equatorial Guinea | Sierra Leone | 2–2 | 2–2 | 2014 FIFA World Cup qualification |
| 7 | 16 June 2013 | Estadio de Malabo, Malabo, Equatorial Guinea | Tunisia | 1–0 | 1–1 | 2014 FIFA World Cup qualification |
| 8 | 7 September 2013 | National Stadium, Freetown, Sierra Leone | Sierra Leone | 1–3 | 2–3 | 2014 FIFA World Cup qualification |
