= Rajindraparsad Seechurn =

Association football referee from Mauritius

- Born: 3 June 1970 (age 56); Mauritius

Domestic
Years	League	Role
1996 -	Mauritius	Referee
2010 -	Africa Cup of Nations	Referee

Rajindraparsad Seechurn (born 3 June 1970) is a Mauritian football referee. He started his career in 1996 and reached the first grade for referees in 2001. He is an international referee and has taken charge of matches for the African Federation since 2004. He refereed at the 2010, 2012, 2013 and 2015 Africa Cup of Nations.

== African Cup of Nations incident ==
In January 2015, while refereeing the quarter-final match at the Africa Cup of Nations, between host nation Equatorial Guinea and Tunisia, he awarded a penalty to the host nation in injury time, which Javier Balboa converted to cancel out Ahmed Akaïchi's 70th-minute goal. Balboa then scored a free-kick in the 102nd minute for an unlikely host nation win.

As the hosts celebrated, fights started between the rival players and Seechurn was attacked by furious Tunisian players as he was sped from the field by security officials.

In February 2015, he was banned for six months for his "poor performance" at the tournament. CAF added that the referee's failings included an "unacceptable failure to maintain calm and ensure proper control of the players during the match". Tunisian federation was fined $50,000 (£33,000) and CAF seek an apology from Tunisia for accusations of bias.
