= Benin at the Africa Cup of Nations =

Benin is a weaker side in the Africa Cup of Nations, and only managed four appearances in the tournament. Benin first appeared in 2004, before qualifying again in 2008, 2010, 2019 and 2025. While Benin has never finished a group stage in the top two in AFCON history, nor even won a single match in the competition, the nation managed its best performance in the 2019 tournament, when they reached the quarter-finals, including a shock win over Morocco on penalties. This made Benin the first team to reach the quarter-finals of the Africa Cup of Nations without ever winning a single competitive match in regulation in their participation history.

== Overall record ==
Africa Cup of Nations record
Year	Round	Position	Pld	W	D*	L	GF	GA
(Sudan) 1957	Part of France							
(United Arab Republic) 1959	Part of France							
(Ethiopia) 1962	Not affiliated to CAF							
(Ghana) 1963	Not affiliated to CAF							
(Tunisia) 1965	Did not enter							
(Ethiopia) 1968	Did not enter							
(Sudan) 1970	Did not enter							
(Cameroon) 1972	Did not qualify							
(Egypt) 1974	Withdrew							
(Ethiopia) 1976	Withdrew							
(Ghana) 1978	Did not enter							
(Nigeria) 1980	Did not qualify							
(Libya) 1982	Did not enter							
(Ivory Coast) 1984	Did not qualify							
(Egypt) 1986	Did not qualify							
(Morocco) 1988	Did not qualify							
(Algeria) 1990	Did not qualify							
(Senegal) 1992	Did not qualify							
(Tunisia) 1994	Did not qualify							
(South Africa) 1996	Withdrew							
(Burkina Faso) 1998	Did not qualify							
(Ghana) (Nigeria) 2000	Did not qualify							
(Mali) 2002	Did not qualify							
(Tunisia) 2004	Group stage	16th	3	0	0	3	1	8
(Egypt) 2006	Did not qualify							
(Ghana) 2008	Group stage	15th	3	0	0	3	1	7
(Angola) 2010	Group stage	14th	3	0	1	2	2	5
(Gabon) (Equatorial Guinea) 2012	Did not qualify							
(South Africa) 2013	Did not qualify							
(Equatorial Guinea) 2015	Did not qualify							
(Gabon) 2017	Did not qualify							
(Egypt) 2019	Quarter-finals	8th	5	0	4	1	3	4
(Cameroon) 2021	Did not qualify							
(Ivory Coast) 2023	Did not qualify							
(Morocco) 2025	Qualified							
(Kenya) (Tanzania) (Uganda) 2027	To be determined							
Total	Quarter-finals	5/35	14	0	5	9	7	24

== Participation history ==
=== 2004 Tunisia ===
Group stage

Team	Pld	W	D	L	GF	GA	GD	Pts
Morocco	3	2	1	0	6	1	+5	7
Nigeria	3	2	0	1	6	2	+4	6
South Africa	3	1	1	1	3	5	−2	4
Benin	3	0	0	3	1	8	−7	0

27 January 2004
18:00

South Africa	2–0	Benin
Nomvethe 58', 76'

Stade Taïeb El Mhiri, Sfax
Attendance: 12,000
Referee: Koman Coulibaly (Mali)
31 January 2004
18:00

Morocco	4–0	Benin
Chamakh 17'; Mokhtari 73'; Ouaddou 75'; El Karkouri 80'

Stade Taïeb El Mhiri, Sfax
Attendance: 20,000
Referee: Eddy Maillet (Seychelles)
4 February 2004
18:00

Nigeria	2–1	Benin
Lawal 35'; Utaka 76'		Latoundji 90'

Stade Taïeb El Mhiri, Sfax
Attendance: 15,000
Referee: Essam Abd El Fatah (Egypt)

=== 2008 Ghana ===
Group stage

Team	Pld	W	D	L	GF	GA	GD	Pts
Ivory Coast	3	3	0	0	8	1	+7	9
Nigeria	3	1	1	1	2	1	+1	4
Mali	3	1	1	1	1	3	−2	4
Benin	3	0	0	3	1	7	−6	0

21 January 2008
19:45

Mali	1–0	Benin
Kanouté 49' (pen.)	Report

Sekondi Stadium, Sekondi-Takoradi
Attendance: 11,000
Referee: Jerome Damon (South Africa)
25 January 2008
17:00

Ivory Coast	4–1	Benin
Drogba 40'; Y. Touré 44'; Keïta 53'; Dindane 63'	Report	Omotoyossi 90'

Sekondi Stadium, Sekondi-Takoradi
Attendance: 13,000
Referee: Kenias Marange (Zimbabwe)
29 January 2008
17:00

Nigeria	2–0	Benin
Mikel 53'; Yakubu 86'	Report

Sekondi Stadium, Sekondi-Takoradi
Attendance: 4,000
Referee: Kacem Bennaceur (Tunisia)

=== 2010 Angola ===
Group stage

Team	Pld	W	D	L	GF	GA	GD	Pts
Egypt	3	3	0	0	7	1	+6	9
Nigeria	3	2	0	1	5	3	+2	6
Benin	3	0	1	2	2	5	−3	1
Mozambique	3	0	1	2	2	7	−5	1

12 January 2010
19:30

Mozambique	2–2	Benin
Miro 29'; Fumo 54'	Report	Omotoyossi 14' (pen.); Khan 20' (o.g.)

Estádio Nacional de Ombaka, Benguela
Attendance: 15,000
Referee: Khalid Abdel Rahman (Sudan)
16 January 2010
17:00

Nigeria	1–0	Benin
Yakubu 42' (pen.)	Report

Estádio Nacional de Ombaka, Benguela
Attendance: 8,000
Referee: Hélder Martins de Carvalho (Angola)
20 January 2010
17:00

Egypt	2–0	Benin
Elmohamady 7'; Moteab 23'	Report

Estádio Nacional de Ombaka, Benguela
Attendance: 12,500
Referee: Daniel Bennett (South Africa)

=== 2019 Egypt ===
Group stage

Pos	Team	Pld	W	D	L	GF	GA	GD	Pts	Qualification
1	Ghana	3	1	2	0	4	2	+2	5	Advance to knockout stage
2	Cameroon	3	1	2	0	2	0	+2	5	Advance to knockout stage
3	Benin	3	0	3	0	2	2	0	3	Advance to knockout stage
4	Guinea-Bissau	3	0	1	2	0	4	−4	1	

Source: CAF
25 June 2019
22:00

Ghana	2–2	Benin
A. Ayew 9'; J. Ayew 42'	Report	Poté 2', 63'

Ismailia Stadium, Ismailia
Attendance: 8,094
Referee: Youssef Essrayri (Tunisia)
29 June 2019
22:00

Benin	0–0	Guinea-Bissau
	Report

Ismailia Stadium, Ismailia
Attendance: 9,212
Referee: Pacifique Ndabihawenimana (Burundi)
2 July 2019
18:00

Benin	0–0	Cameroon
	Report

Ismailia Stadium, Ismailia
Attendance: 14,120
Referee: Sadok Selmi (Tunisia)

Round of sixteen

5 July 2019
18:00

Morocco	1–1 (a.e.t.)	Benin
En-Nesyri 76'	Report	Adilehou 53'
Penalties
Idrissi (penalty scored); Boufal (penalty missed); En-Nesyri (penalty missed)	1–4	(penalty scored) Verdon; (penalty scored) Djigla; (penalty scored) Anaane; (penalty scored) Séïbou

Al Salam Stadium, Cairo
Attendance: 7,500
Referee: Hélder Martins de Carvalho (Angola)

Quarter-finals

10 July 2019
18:00

Senegal	1–0	Benin
Gueye 70'	Report

30 June Stadium, Cairo
Attendance: 5,798
Referee: Mustapha Ghorbal (Algeria)
