= 2019 Africa Cup of Nations Group F =

Football tournament group stage

Group F of the 2019 Africa Cup of Nations took place from 25 June to 2 July 2019. The group consisted of Benin, defending champions Cameroon, Ghana and Guinea-Bissau.

Ghana and Cameroon as the top two teams, along with Benin as one of the four best third-placed teams, advanced to the round of 16.

== Teams ==
Draw position	Team	Zone	Method of qualification	Date of qualification	Finals appearance	Last appearance	Previous best performance	FIFA Rankings	
Draw position	Team	Zone	Method of qualification	Date of qualification	Finals appearance	Last appearance	Previous best performance	April 2019 (Note: The rankings of April 2019 were used for seeding for the final draw.)	June 2019
F1	Cameroon	UNIFFAC	Group B runners-up	23 March 2019	19th	2017	Winners (1984, 1988, 2000, 2002, 2017)	54	51
F2	Ghana	WAFU	Group F winners	30 November 2018	22nd	2017	Winners (1963, 1965, 1978, 1982)	49	50
F3	Benin	WAFU	Group D runners-up	24 March 2019	4th	2010	Group stage (2004, 2008, 2010)	91	88
F4	Guinea-Bissau	WAFU	Group K winners	23 March 2019	2nd	2017	Group stage (2017)	118	118

== Standings ==
Pos	Team	Pld	W	D	L	GF	GA	GD	Pts	Qualification
1	Ghana	3	1	2	0	4	2	+2	5	Advance to knockout stage
2	Cameroon	3	1	2	0	2	0	+2	5	Advance to knockout stage
3	Benin	3	0	3	0	2	2	0	3	Advance to knockout stage
4	Guinea-Bissau	3	0	1	2	0	4	−4	1	

Source: CAF
Rules for classification: Tiebreakers

In the round of 16:

- The winners of Group F, Ghana, advanced to play the runners-up of Group E, Tunisia.
- The runners-up of Group F, Cameroon, advanced to play the runners-up of Group B, Cameroon.
- The third-placed team of Group F, Benin, advanced to play the winners of Group D, Morocco.

== Matches ==
=== Cameroon vs Guinea-Bissau ===
25 June 2019
19:00

Cameroon	2–0	Guinea-Bissau
Yaya 66'; Bahoken 69'	Report

Ismailia Stadium, Ismailia
Attendance: 5,983
Referee: Noureddine El Jaafari (Morocco)

Cameroon	Guinea-Bissau

GK	1	André Onana
RB	12	Joyskim Dawa
CB	4	Banana Yaya
CB	5	Michael Ngadeu-Ngadjui	(yellow card) 78'
LB	6	Ambroise Oyongo
DM	14	Georges Mandjeck
DM	8	André-Frank Zambo Anguissa
CM	10	Arnaud Djoum		(substituted off) 67'
RF	11	Christian Bassogog
CF	13	Eric Maxim Choupo-Moting (c)		(substituted off) 79'
LF	17	Karl Toko Ekambi		(substituted off) 68'
Substitutions:
FW	9	Stéphane Bahoken		(substituted in) 67'
FW	7	Clinton N'Jie		(substituted in) 68'
FW	20	Olivier Boumal	(yellow card) 85'	(substituted in) 79'
Manager:
(Netherlands) Clarence Seedorf

GK	1	Jonas Mendes
RB	2	Nadjack
CB	14	Juary Soares
CB	5	Rudinilson Silva	(yellow card) 58'
LB	22	Mamadu Candé
DM	10	Pelé
RW	7	Zezinho (c)
AM	18	Piqueti		(substituted off) 76'
LW	20	Sori Mané
CF	13	Frédéric Mendy		(substituted off) 81'
CF	15	Toni Silva		(substituted off) 71'
Substitutions:
FW	17	Mama Baldé		(substituted in) 71'
FW	11	Jorginho		(substituted in) 76'
FW	19	Joseph Mendes		(substituted in) 81'
Manager:
Baciro Candé

Man of the Match:
André-Frank Zambo Anguissa (Cameroon)

Assistant referees:
Lahcen Azgaou (Morocco)
Mustapha Akarkad (Morocco)
Fourth official:
Redouane Jiyed (Morocco)

=== Ghana vs Benin ===
25 June 2019
22:00

Ghana	2–2	Benin
A. Ayew 9'; J. Ayew 42'	Report	Poté 2', 63'

Ismailia Stadium, Ismailia
Attendance: 8,094
Referee: Youssef Essrayri (Tunisia)

Ghana	Benin

GK	1	Richard Ofori
RB	22	Andy Yiadom
CB	21	John Boye	(yellow card) 37' (yellow-red card) 55'
CB	15	Kasim Nuhu	(yellow card) 77'
LB	14	Lumor Agbenyenu
CM	5	Thomas Partey
CM	11	Mubarak Wakaso
RW	7	Christian Atsu
AM	23	Thomas Agyepong		(substituted off) 36'
LW	10	André Ayew (c)		(substituted off) 89'
CF	9	Jordan Ayew
Substitutions:
MF	19	Samuel Owusu		(substituted in) 36' (substituted off) 59'
DF	4	Jonathan Mensah		(substituted in) 59'
MF	6	Afriyie Acquah		(substituted in) 89'
Manager:
James Kwesi Appiah

GK	1	Fabien Farnolle
RB	2	Séidou Barazé
CB	3	Khaled Adénon (c)
CB	6	Olivier Verdon
LB	13	Moise Adilehou		(substituted off) 62'
RM	14	Cebio Soukou		(substituted off) 83'
CM	8	Jordan Adéoti
CM	15	Sessi D'Almeida	(yellow card) 46'	(substituted off) 63'
LM	11	Emmanuel Imorou
CF	10	Mickaël Poté
CF	9	Steve Mounié	(yellow card) 90'
Substitutions:
MF	18	Mama Séïbou		(substituted in) 62'
FW	20	Jodel Dossou		(substituted in) 63'
FW	7	David Djigla		(substituted in) 83'
Manager:
(France) Michel Dussuyer

Man of the Match:
Jordan Ayew (Ghana)
Assistant referees:
Yamen Mellouchi (Tunisia)
Ahmed Taha (Egypt)
Fourth official:
Amin Omar (Egypt)

=== Cameroon vs Ghana ===
29 June 2019
19:00

Cameroon	0–0	Ghana
	Report

Ismailia Stadium, Ismailia
Attendance: 16,724
Referee: Bamlak Tessema Weyesa (Ethiopia)

Cameroon	Ghana

GK	1	André Onana
RB	2	Collins Fai
CB	22	Jean-Armel Kana-Biyik
CB	5	Michael Ngadeu-Ngadjui
LB	6	Ambroise Oyongo
RM	7	Clinton N'Jie
CM	8	André-Frank Zambo Anguissa	(substituted off) 82'
CM	14	Georges Mandjeck (c)
LM	3	Gaëtan Bong	(substituted off) 74'
CF	11	Christian Bassogog
CF	17	Karl Toko Ekambi	(substituted off) 74'
Substitutions:
FW	13	Eric Maxim Choupo-Moting	(substituted in) 74'
FW	9	Stéphane Bahoken	(substituted in) 74'
MF	15	Pierre Kunde	(substituted in) 82'
Manager:
(Netherlands) Clarence Seedorf

GK	1	Richard Ofori
RB	22	Andy Yiadom
CB	15	Kasim Nuhu	(yellow card) 64'
CB	4	Jonathan Mensah
LB	17	Baba Rahman
CM	5	Thomas Partey
CM	11	Mubarak Wakaso
RW	7	Christian Atsu		(substituted off) 15'
AM	20	Kwadwo Asamoah		(substituted off) 78'
LW	10	André Ayew (c)		(substituted off) 87'
CF	9	Jordan Ayew
Substitutions:
MF	19	Samuel Owusu		(substituted in) 15'
FW	3	Asamoah Gyan		(substituted in) 78'
FW	8	Owusu Kwabena		(substituted in) 87'
Manager:
James Kwesi Appiah

Man of the Match:
André-Frank Zambo Anguissa (Cameroon)

Assistant referees:
Mohammad Ibrahim (Sudan)
Gilbert Cheruiyot (Kenya)
Fourth official:
Mustapha Ghorbal (Algeria)

=== Benin vs Guinea-Bissau ===
29 June 2019
22:00

Benin	0–0	Guinea-Bissau
	Report

Ismailia Stadium, Ismailia
Attendance: 9,212
Referee: Pacifique Ndabihawenimana (Burundi)

Benin	Guinea-Bissau

GK	1	Fabien Farnolle
CB	2	Séidou Barazé
CB	3	Khaled Adénon
CB	6	Olivier Verdon
RM	14	Cebio Soukou	(yellow card) 60'	(substituted off) 64'
CM	8	Jordan Adéoti	(yellow card) 38'
CM	15	Sessi D'Almeida		(substituted off) 65'
LM	11	Emmanuel Imorou
AM	17	Stéphane Sessègnon (c)
CF	10	Mickaël Poté		(substituted off) 90'
CF	9	Steve Mounié
Substitutions:
FW	20	Jodel Dossou		(substituted in) 64'
MF	18	Mama Séïbou		(substituted in) 65'
FW	7	David Djigla		(substituted in) 90'
Manager:
(France) Michel Dussuyer

GK	1	Jonas Mendes
RB	21	Nanu	(yellow card) 10'
CB	4	Marcelo Djaló
CB	14	Juary Soares
LB	22	Mamadu Candé (c)
CM	3	Burá
CM	20	Sori Mané
CM	10	Pelé		(substituted off) 69'
RF	17	Mama Baldé		(substituted off) 86'
CF	13	Frédéric Mendy
LF	18	Piqueti		(substituted off) 90+2'
Substitutions:
MF	8	João Jaquité		(substituted in) 69'
FW	11	Jorginho		(substituted in) 86'
FW	9	Romário Baldé		(substituted in) 90+2'
Manager:
Baciro Candé

Man of the Match:
Piqueti (Guinea-Bissau)

Assistant referees:
Abouelregal Mahmoud (Egypt)
Lionel Andrianantenaiana (Madagascar)
Fourth official:
Eric Otogo-Castane (Gabon)

=== Benin vs Cameroon ===
2 July 2019
18:00

Benin	0–0	Cameroon
	Report

Ismailia Stadium, Ismailia
Attendance: 14,120
Referee: Sadok Selmi (Tunisia)

Benin	Cameroon

GK	16	Saturnin Allagbé
CB	2	Séidou Barazé	(yellow card) 54'
CB	3	Khaled Adénon
CB	6	Olivier Verdon
RM	20	Jodel Dossou		(substituted off) 69'
CM	8	Jordan Adéoti
CM	18	Mama Séïbou
LM	12	David Kiki
AM	17	Stéphane Sessègnon (c)
CF	7	David Djigla		(substituted off) 76'
CF	9	Steve Mounié	(yellow card) 45'
Substitutions:
FW	14	Cebio Soukou		(substituted in) 69'
FW	10	Mickaël Poté		(substituted in) 76'
Manager:
(France) Michel Dussuyer

GK	1	André Onana
RB	2	Collins Fai	(yellow card) 42'	(substituted off) 46'
CB	4	Banana Yaya
CB	5	Michael Ngadeu-Ngadjui
LB	6	Ambroise Oyongo	(yellow card) 90+1'
DM	8	André-Frank Zambo Anguissa	(yellow card) 77'
CM	15	Pierre Kunde
CM	10	Arnaud Djoum	(yellow card) 20'	(substituted off) 66'
AM	17	Karl Toko Ekambi		(substituted off) 83'
CF	9	Stéphane Bahoken
CF	13	Eric Maxim Choupo-Moting (c)
Substitutions:
FW	7	Clinton N'Jie		(substituted in) 46'
FW	20	Olivier Boumal		(substituted in) 66'
FW	11	Christian Bassogog		(substituted in) 83'
Manager:
(Netherlands) Clarence Seedorf

Man of the Match:
Pierre Kunde (Cameroon)

Assistant referees:
Attia Amsaaed (Libya)
Yamen Mellouchi (Tunisia)
Fourth official:
Haythem Guirat (Tunisia)

=== Guinea-Bissau vs Ghana ===
2 July 2019
18:00

Guinea-Bissau	0–2	Ghana
	Report	J. Ayew 46'; Partey 72'

Suez Stadium, Suez
Attendance: 6,905
Referee: Eric Otogo-Castane (Gabon)

Guinea-Bissau	Ghana

GK	1	Jonas Mendes
RB	21	Nanu
CB	14	Juary Soares
CB	4	Marcelo Djaló
LB	22	Mamadu Candé (c)	(yellow card) 65'
CM	3	Burá	(yellow card) 51'	(substituted off) 64'
CM	20	Sori Mané
CM	10	Pelé
RF	17	Mama Baldé
CF	19	Joseph Mendes		(substituted off) 79'
LF	18	Piqueti		(substituted off) 68'
Substitutions:
MF	16	Moreto Cassamá		(substituted in) 64'
FW	15	Toni Silva		(substituted in) 68'
FW	13	Frédéric Mendy		(substituted in) 79'
Manager:
Baciro Candé

GK	1	Richard Ofori
RB	22	Andy Yiadom
CB	18	Joseph Aidoo	(yellow card) 23'
CB	21	John Boye
LB	17	Baba Rahman
RM	19	Samuel Owusu		(substituted off) 86'
CM	5	Thomas Partey		(substituted off) 83'
CM	11	Mubarak Wakaso
LM	8	Owusu Kwabena		(substituted off) 66'
CF	9	Jordan Ayew
CF	10	André Ayew (c)
Substitutions:
MF	6	Afriyie Acquah		(substituted in) 66'
FW	13	Caleb Ekuban		(substituted in) 83'
MF	20	Kwadwo Asamoah		(substituted in) 86'
Manager:
James Kwesi Appiah

Man of the Match:
Mubarak Wakaso (Ghana)

Assistant referees:
Jerson dos Santos (Angola)
Issa Yaya (Chad)
Fourth official:
Beida Dahane (Mauritania)
