= Banana Yaya =

Cameroonian footballer (born 1991)

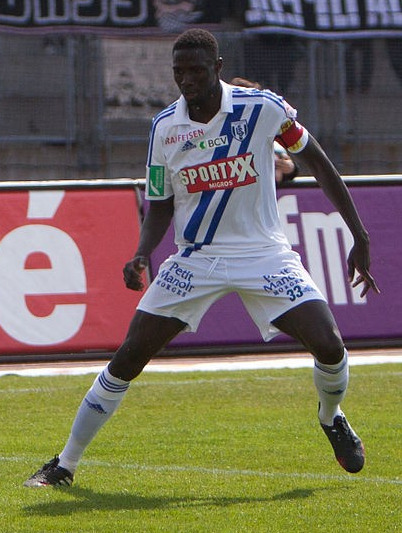
- Yaya in 2014

Personal information
- Full name: Banana Yaya
- Date of birth: 29 July 1991 (age 35)
- Place of birth: Maroua, Cameroon
- Height: 1.92 m (6 ft 4 in)
- Position: Centre-back

Youth career
- –2009: Achille FC Yaouande

Senior career*
Years	Team	Apps	(Gls)
2009–2012	ES Tunis	15	(1)
2012–2014	Sochaux	26	(0)
2013–2014	→ Lausanne-Sport (loan)	24	(1)
2014–2017	Platanias	79	(2)
2017–2019	Olympiacos	0	(0)
2017–2019	→ Panionios (loan)	49	(1)
2020–2021	Shabab Al-Ordon	21	(3)
2022	Bengaluru	5	(0)
2023–2025	AS Trouville-Deauville		

International career^{‡}
2009–2011	Cameroon U20	14	(1)
2015–2019	Cameroon	16	(2)
- * Club domestic league appearances and goals as of 16:49, 5 March 2022 (UTC) ‡ National team caps and goals as of 18:51, 12 July 2019 (UTC)

Banana Yaya (born 29 July 1991) is a Cameroonian professional footballer who plays as a Centre-back.

== Club career ==
In June 2009, Yaya signed with Tunisian club Espérance Sportive de Tunis where he started his professional playing career. After rumours linking him with English Championship giants Leeds United Banana signed for Sochaux from Espérance Tunis on 17 January 2012.

Yaya was sent on loan to Swiss club Lausanne-Sport for the 2013–14 season.

On 30 July 2014, he signed for Greek Super League club, Platanias for an undisclosed fee. He immediately became the undisputed leader of the club's defense.

On 23 June 2017, after the end of his contract with Platanias, he joined Olympiacos, remaining in the Super League. On the same day he was loaned to Panionios on a season-long loan, as he was not in the plans of Olympiacos coach. His loan was extended for another year.

On 4 December 2019, his contract with Olympiacos was terminated without making a single appearance for the club.

On 1 February 2022, it was announced that Bengaluru FC signed Yaya on a short-term deal for the remainder of the 2021–22 Indian Super League season.

In 2023 he signed for AS Trouville-Deauville

== International career ==
Yaya made his debut for Cameroon starting against Thailand in a friendly match in March 2015.

On 11 November 2017, Banana scored his first goal for Cameroon against Zambia.

In the 2019 Africa Cup of Nations in Egypt, Yaya was called up to his national team. In his first match against Guinea-Bissau, he scored in the 66th minute and the team won 2–0.

== Career statistics ==
As of matches played on 12 July 2019

Cameroon national team
Year	Apps	Goals
2015	2	0
2017	2	1
2018	6	0
2019	6	1
Total	16	2

Scores and results list Cameroon's goal tally first.

No	Date	Venue	Opponent	Score	Result	Competition
1.	11 November 2017	Levy Mwanawasa Stadium, Ndola, Zambia	Zambia	2–2	2–2	2018 FIFA World Cup qualification
2.	25 June 2019	Ismailia Stadium, Ismailia, Egypt	Guinea-Bissau	1–0	2–0	2019 Africa Cup of Nations

== Honours ==
Individual

- CAF Team of the Year: 2011
