= Ben Williams (referee) =

Australian soccer referee (born 1977)

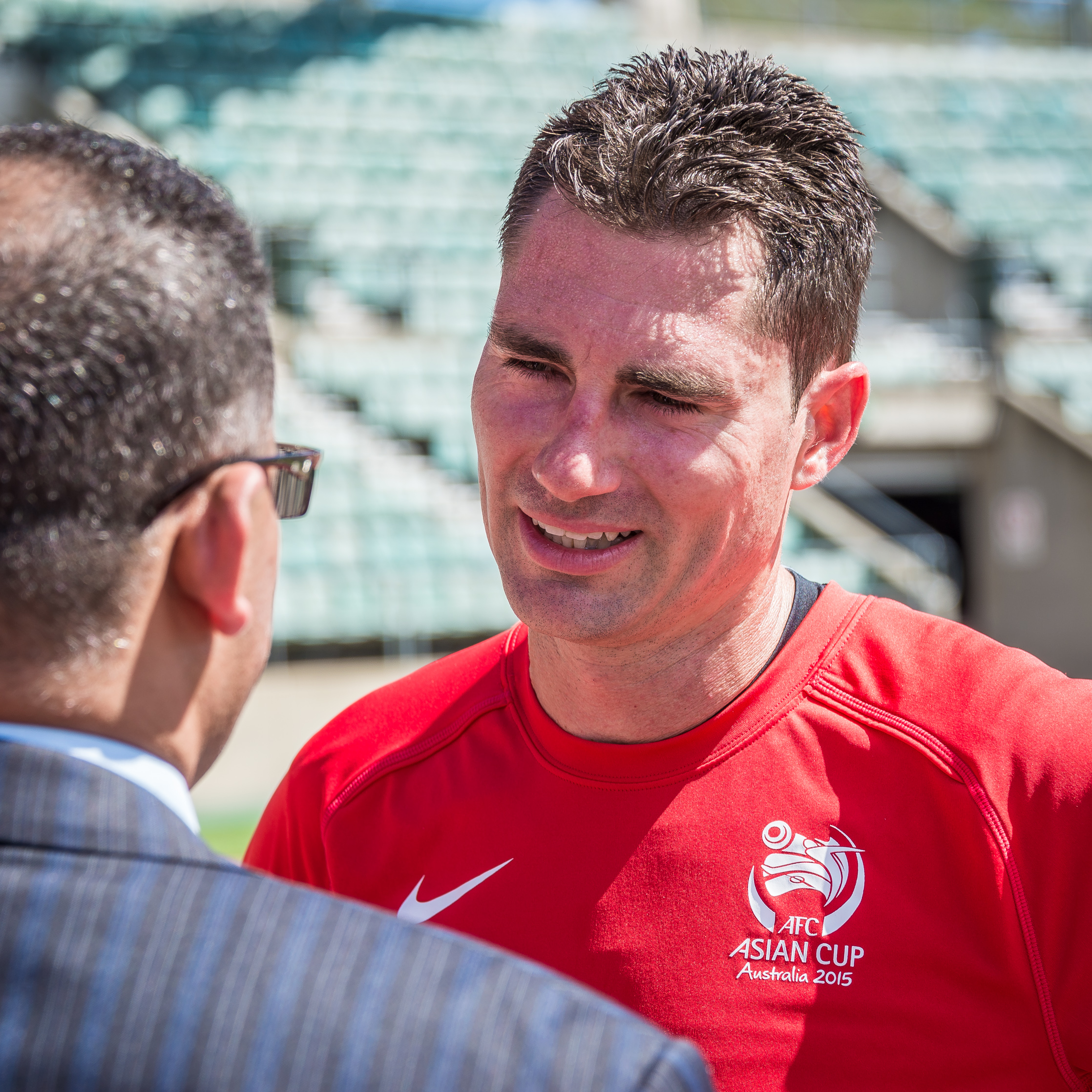
- Full name: Benjamin Jon Williams
- Born: 14 April 1977 (age 49); Canberra, Australia
- Other occupation: Physical & outdoor education teacher, health teacher, coach

Domestic
| Years | League | Role |
| 2005–2016 | A-League | Referee |

International
| Years | League | Role |
| 2005–2016 | FIFA listed | Referee |
| 2005–2016 | AFC Elite | Referee |

Benjamin Jon Williams (born 14 April 1977), better known as Ben Williams, is a retired Australian football referee.

== Refereeing career ==
Williams officiates in the Asian Champions League (ACL), AFC Cup and in the Australian A-League football competition. He has been a FIFA referee since 2005 and AFC Elite panel referee since 2006.

Williams has been selected to referee at the FIFA 2014 World Cup Brazil and is the only Australian referee to be selected.

He was selected to officiate at the 2012 Asian Champions League (ACL) final in Korea between Ulsan Hyundai and Al Ahli. He has officiated in the AFC Champions League since 2007.

In 2012, he was also selected to officiate 4 matches (2 as referee and 2 as 4th official) at the 2012 Summer Olympics. He officiated in the opening Great Britain match at Old Trafford against Senegal in front of approximately 75,000 spectators.

He officiated at the 2013 FIFA U20 World Cup Turkey, 2010 FIFA Club World Cup and 2011 AFC Asian Cup.

Williams debuted in the Hyundai A-League in Round 1, 26 August 2005 and at time of retirement, was the most experienced referee in the A-League. He refereed his 100th match, Central Coast Mariners vs Adelaide United, at Bluetongue Stadium in March 2012.

On 15 January 2014, FIFA announced that Ben Williams was selected as one of the 25 2014 FIFA World Cup officials. In preparation of the tournament Williams took six months off work to ensure he could focus on his training and preparation. He was the first Australian referee appointed as the referee to a second-round game of a World Cup. He was also one of officials in 2015 AFC Asian Cup.

On 22 July 2016, the Football Federation Australia announced that Williams would retire from refereeing after 22 years on the national panels and 12 years as a FIFA referee. Williams, in total, refereed 161 Hyundai A-League matches and 24 NSL matches throughout his career. He also refereed the 2015 Westfield FFA Cup final as well as international matches through the AFC and FIFA panels, including becoming the first Australian referee to officiate at a knockout match at a FIFA World Cup in 2014.

=== Matches ===
==== A-League matches ====
Williams is currently the most experienced A-League referee having refereed 130 matches by the end of the 2013/2014 season.

- 2005/2006 season: 16 matches (including: 2 pre-season; minor semi-final 1st leg)
- 2006/2007 season: 12 matches (including: 3 pre-season)
- 2007/2008 season: 16 matches (including: 3 pre-season; major semi-final 2nd leg)
- 2008/2009 season: 16 matches (including: 1 pre-season; minor semi-final 1st leg)
- 2009/2010 season: 21 matches
- 2010/2011 season: 15 matches
- 2011/2012 season: 12 matches (including: 100th match; grand final (4th official))
- 2012/2013 season: 12 matches (excluding: 1 pre-season)
- 2013/2014 season: 18 matches (including: 1 elimination final)
- 2014/2015 season: 11 matches (including: 2 finals matches - elimination final 2 and semi-final 2)

==== International matches ====
- 14-3-2007: Hong Kong – Syria (2nd Stage)
- 6-6-2007: Vietnam – Indonesia (2nd Stage)
- 22-8-2007: Korea Republic – Uzbekistan (final stage)
- 12-9-2007: Japan – Qatar (final Stage)

==== AFC Cup ====
- 10-4-2007: Pahang – Tampines Rovers (group stage)
- 9-5-2007: Victory SC – Sun Hei (group stage)

==== AFC Champions League ====
- 12-3-2008: Sepahan – Al Ittihad (group stage)
- 19-4-2008: Al Wahda – Al Sadd (group stage)
- 24-9-2008: Urawa Red Diamonds – Al Qadsia (quarter-final)
- 17-3-2009: Shandong Luneng – Sriwijaya (group stage)
- 07-4-2009: Al Jazira – Ittihad (group stage)
- 05-5-2009: Ettifaq – Bunyodkor (group stage)
- 24-5-2009: Kashima Antlers – FC Seoul (round of 16)
- 24-9-2009: Pakhtakor – Ittihad (quarter-final first leg)
- 30-1-2010: Singapore Armed Forces FC – Sriwijaya (qualifying play-off)
- 23-2-2010: Bunyodkor – Ittihad (group stage)
- 30-3-2010: Sanat Mes Kerman – Al Sadd (group stage)
- 13-4-2010: Singapore Armed Forces FC – Henan Jianye (group stage)
- 28-4-2010: Al-Ahli SC – Al-Gharafa (group stage)
- 12-5-2010: Al-Hilal – Bunyodkor (round of 16)
- 22-9-2010: Pohang Steelers – Zobahan (quarter-final second leg)
- 2-3-2011: Al-Wahda – Bunyodkor (group stage)
- 5-4-2011: Al-Hilal – Al Jazira (group stage)
- 3-5-2011: Al Sadd – Esteghlal (group stage)
- 14-9-2011: Sepahan – Al Sadd (quarter-final first leg)
- 6-3-2012: Al Rayyan – Esteghlal (group stage)
- 4-4-2012: Al Shabab – Al-Hilal (group stage)
- 10-11-2012: Ulsan Hyundai – Al-Ahli SC (final)
- 27-2-2013: Al Rayyan – Esteghlal (group stage)
- 12-3-2013: Urawa Red Diamonds – Muangthong United (group stage)
- 2-4-2013: Al Nasr – Al-Gharafa (group stage)
- 14-5-2013: Buriram United – Bunyodkor (Round 16 first leg)
- 25-9-2013: FC Seoul – Esteghlal (semi-final first leg)
- 14-4-2014: Al Hilal - Bunyodkor (Round 16 second leg)
- 25-9-2015: Al Hilal – Lekhwiya SC (quarter-final first leg)

==== 2008 AFC U-19 Championship ====
- 31-10-2008: Saudi Arabia – Iran (final round)
- 2-11-2008: United Arab Emirates – Korea Republic (final round)
- 8-11-2008: China – Uzbekistan (quarter-final)

==== 2010 FIFA World Cup qualification (AFC) ====
- 14-6-2008: Singapore – Saudi Arabia (3rd Stage)
- 22-6-2008: Jordan – Turkmenistan (3rd Stage)
- 11-2-2009: Iran – Korea Republic
- 10-6-2009: Korea Republic – Saudi Arabia

==== 2011 AFC Asian Cup qualification ====
- 21-1-2009: Malaysia – United Arab Emirates
- 14-11-2009: Vietnam – Syria
- 6-1-2010: Thailand – Jordan

==== 2010 Asian Games ====
Guangzhou, China (3–25 November 2010)

- 8-11-2010: North Korea - South Korea
- 10-11-2010: Iran - Bahrain
- 13-11-2010: China - Malaysia
  - In this game he gave 3 Red Cards and 7 Yellow Cards, all the cards were for Malaysia, some of the Red Cards was given for protesting referee's decision. The result was 8-man Malaysians being thrashed 3–0 by the Chinese football team at the Asian Games in Guangzhou.
- 15-11-2010: Qatar - Uzbekistan (1/8 final)
- 23-11-2010: South Korea - UAE (semi-final)

==== FIFA Club World Cup ====
Abu Dhabi, UAE (1–20 December 2010)

- 10-12-2012: TP Mazembe Congo - Pachuca Mexico (4th Official)
- 14-12-2012: TP Mazembe Congo - S.C. Internacional Brasil (semi-final) (4th Official)
- 15-12-2010: Pachuca Mexico - Al-Wahda UAE (4th Official)

==== 2011 AFC Asian Cup ====
Doha, Qatar (7–29 January 2011)

- 8-1-2011: Kuwait - China PR Al Gharafa Stadium, Doha (Attendance 7,423)
- 13-1-2012: Saudi Arabia - Jordan (4th Official) Ahmed bin Ali Stadium, Al Rayyan (Attendance 17,349)
- 17-1-2012: Japan - Saudi Arabia (4th Official) Ahmed bin Ali Stadium, Al Rayyan (Attendance 2,022)

==== 2014 FIFA World Cup qualification (AFC) ====
- 28-7-2011: Indonesia - Turkmenistan (2nd round)
- 11-10-2011: Japan - Tajikistan (3rd round)
- 11-11-2011: Jordan - Singapore (3rd round)
- 11-9-2012: Uzbekistan - South Korea (4th round)
- 10 September 2012: Uzbekistan – Jordan (Play-off 2nd leg)

==== 2012 Men's Football Olympics – Asian qualifiers ====
- 19 June 2011: China PR – Oman Hongkou Football Stadium, Shanghai, China (Attendance: 13,500)

==== 2012 Summer Olympics football tournament ====
- 26-7-2012: Great Britain - Senegal (first round Group A) Old Trafford, Manchester (4th Official)
- 29-7-2012: Mexico - Gabon (first round Group B) City of Coventry Stadium, Coventry
- 1-08-2012: Spain - Morocco (first round Group D) Old Trafford, Manchester
- 4-08-2012: Mexico - Senegal (quarter-final) Wembley Football Stadium, London (4th Official)

==== 2013 EAFF East Asian Cup ====
- 21-7-2013: Japan - China PR (final Tournament)

==== 2014 FIFA World Cup ====
- 20-6-2014: Honduras - Ecuador (group stage)
- 26-6-2014: Korea Republic - Belgium (group stage)
- 29-6-2014: Costa Rica - Greece (round of 16)
- 5-7-2014: Argentina - Belgium (4th Official) (quarter-final)

==== 2015 AFC Asian Cup ====
- 11-1-2015: Iran - Bahrain (group stage)
- 18-1-2015: Uzbekistan - Saudi Arabia (group stage)
- 23-1-2015: Iran – Iraq (quarter-final)

==== 2018 FIFA World Cup qualification (AFC) ====
- 24-5-2015: Thailand - Vietnam (2nd round)

==== 2016 Kirin Cup ====
- 3-6-2016: Denmark - Bosnia and Herzegovina (semi-finals)
  - This was Williams' third PSO in three years after refereeing in 2015 Asian Cup PSO between Iran - Iraq; and in 2014 FIFA World Cup between Costa Rica - Greece.

== Teaching career ==
During his refereeing career, Williams was a public high school teacher in the Australian Capital Territory, where he has taught at Melba High School, Belconnen High School, and Lyneham High School. In 2020 he was promoted to an executive position at the University of Canberra High School Kaleen where he continues to teach physical education. And from 2026 to now, he is teaching at Shirley Smith High School as a executive teacher and the head teacher of physical education.

== Honours ==
- 2013 AFC Referee of the Year
- National Soccer League (NSL) 2002 Assistant Referee of the Year
- 2008 ACT Sportstar Official of the Year
