= Sori Mané =

Bissau-Guinean footballer

Personal information
- Full name: Manconi Soriano Mané
- Date of birth: 3 April 1996 (age 30)
- Place of birth: Bissau, Guinea-Bissau
- Height: 1.87 m (6 ft 2 in)
- Positions: Defensive midfielder; centre-back

Team information
- Current team: Torpedo Kutaisi
- Number: 16

Youth career
- Fidjus di Bideras
- 2014–2015: Sampdoria

Senior career*
Years	Team	Apps	(Gls)
2015–2016	Sampdoria	0	(0)
2015–2016	→ Olhanense (loan)	6	(1)
2016–2017	Olhanense	31	(0)
2017–2019	Cova da Piedade	49	(1)
2019–2023	Moreirense	55	(2)
2023–2025	Académico Viseu	57	(0)
2025–	Torpedo Kutaisi	13	(0)

International career^{‡}
2017–	Guinea-Bissau	51	(0)
- * Club domestic league appearances and goals as of 15:51, 5 November 2025 (UTC) ‡ National team caps and goals as of 23:43, 31 March 2026 (UTC)

Manconi Soriano "Sori" Mané (born 3 April 1996) is a Bissau-Guinean professional footballer who plays as a defensive midfielder or a centre-back for Erovnuli Liga club Torpedo Kutaisi.

== Club career ==
=== Early career ===
Mané was born in Bissau. He finished his youth career in Italy, with UC Sampdoria.

In late 2015, Mané was loaned to Portuguese club S.C. Olhanense. He made his LigaPro debut on 31 January 2016, featuring the first half of the 1–0 away loss against Atlético Clube de Portugal. His first goal came also that season, in a 2–0 away victory over Leixões S.C. on 8 May.

Mané continued in the Portuguese second division the following years, with Olhanense and C.D. Cova da Piedade.

=== Moreirense ===
On 11 July 2019, Mané signed a four-year contract with Primeira Liga club Moreirense FC. He made his debut on the competition on 11 August, starting in a 3–1 defeat at S.C. Braga.

Mané spent the vast majority of the 2020–21 season on the sidelines, due to a knee injury. On 14 May 2022, he scored his first goal for his new team, opening a 4–1 home win over F.C. Vizela; in the subsequent promotion and relegation play-offs, they lost 2–1 on aggregate to G.D. Chaves.

In the 2022–23 campaign, Mané scored once in 27 games (31 in all competitions) to help Moreirense win the second division and subsequently promote.

=== Later career ===
Mané remained in division two in summer 2023, on a two-year deal at Académico de Viseu. On 1 July 2025, the free agent moved to the Georgian Erovnuli Liga with FC Torpedo Kutaisi.

== International career ==
Mané made his debut for the Guinea-Bissau national team on 25 March 2017, in a 3–1 friendly loss to South Africa where he came on as an injury-time substitute. He was part of the squad that participated in the 2019 Africa Cup of Nations.

== Honours ==
Moreirense

- Liga Portugal 2: 2022–23
