= PSL Referee of the Season =

The PSL Referee of the Season in South African football is awarded to the most outstanding referee of the season.

Season	Referee
2000–01	Daniel Bennett
2001–02	Simon Motau
2002–03	Andile Ncobo
2003–04	Andile Ncobo
2004–05	Jerome Damon
2005–06	A. Ncobo & Abdul Ebrahim
2006–07	Abdul Ebrahim
2007–08	Andile Ncobo
2008–09	Jerome Damon
2009–10	Buyile Gqubule
2010–11	Daniel Bennett
2011–12	Victor Hlungwani
2012–13	Victor Gomes
2013–14	Zolile Mthetho
2014–15	Phillip Tinyani
2015–16	Thando Ndzandzeka
2016–17	
2017–18	
2018–19	
2019–20	
2020–21	
2021–22	
2022–23	Masixole Bambiso
2023–24	Sikhumbuzo Gasa
2024–25	Masixole Bambiso
2025–26	Eugene Mdluli

== See also ==
- PSL Awards § Assistant Referee of the season
