= Victor Gomes =

South African football referee (born 1982)

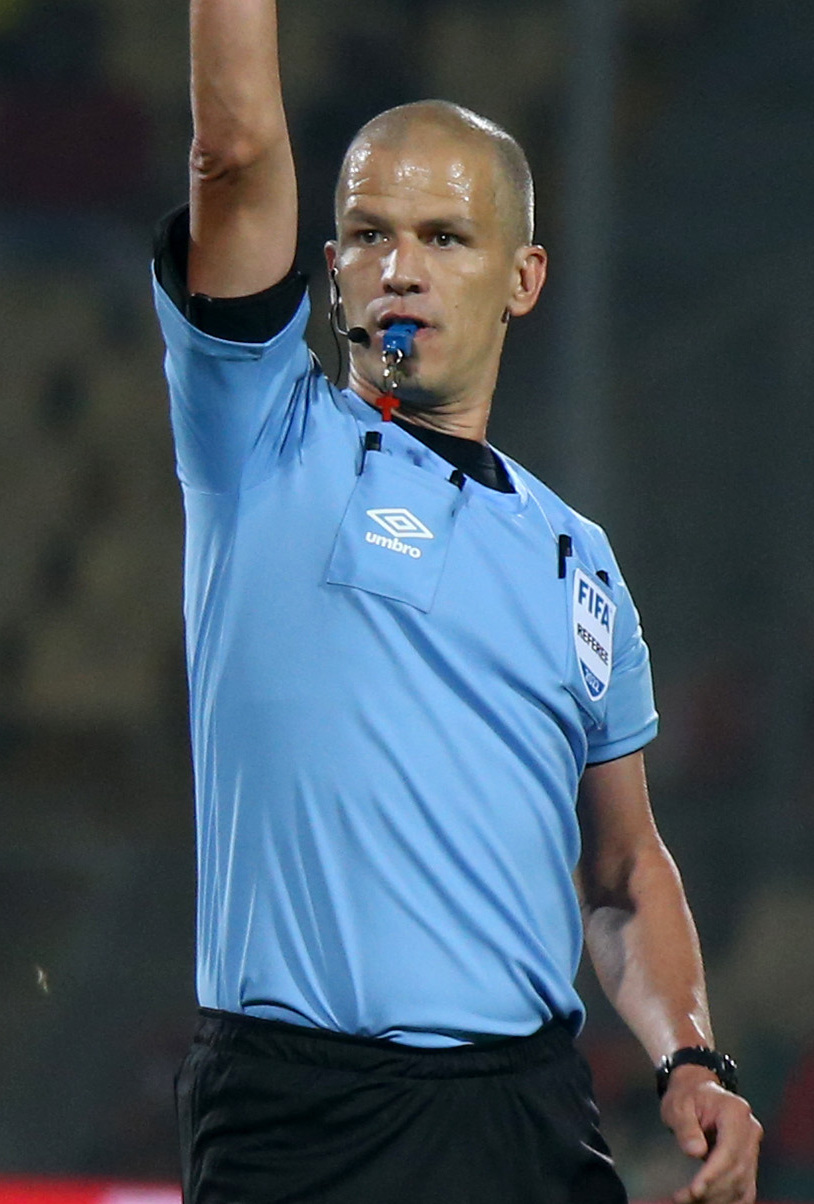
- Full name: Victor Miguel de Freitas Gomes
- Born: 15 December 1982 (age 43); Johannesburg, South Africa

Domestic
Years	League	Role
2008–2022	Premier Soccer League	Referee

International
Years	League	Role
2011–2022	FIFA	Referee
–2022	CAF	Referee

Victor Miguel de Freitas Gomes (born 15 December 1982) is a retired South African football referee. He is the current chairman of the SAFA Referees Committee.

A PSL referee since 2008, Gomes was voted PSL Referee of the Season in 2012–13 and 2017–18 and has been an international referee since 2011.

In 2018, he was hailed by the South African Football Association after he rejected and reported an attempted bribe of over R300 000. Gomes had been approached and offered the sum of money to fix a CAF Confederation Cup match between Nigerian side Plateau United and Algerian side USM Alger. He was again nominated for the PSL Referee of the Season award upon the conclusion of the domestic campaign.

He officiated the 2019 and 2021 edition of Africa Cup of Nations. He refereed the 2021 Africa Cup of Nations Final between Senegal and Egypt.

Gomes announced his retirement after the 2022 FIFA World Cup.

In February 2023 he was announced as the chair of the SAFA Referees Committee.
