= 2019 Africa Cup of Nations =

32nd edition of the Africa Cup of Nations

2019 كأس الأمم الأفريقية
- Official logo

Tournament details
- Host country: Egypt
- Dates: 21 June – 19 July
- Teams: 24
- Venues: 6 (in 4 host cities)

Final positions
- Champions: Algeria (2nd title)
- Runners-up: Senegal
- Third place: Nigeria
- Fourth place: Tunisia

Tournament statistics
- Matches played: 52
- Goals scored: 102 (1.96 per match)
- Attendance: 943,053 (18,136 per match)
- Top scorer: (Nigeria) Odion Ighalo (5 goals)
- Best player: (Algeria) Ismaël Bennacer
- Best young player: (Senegal) Krépin Diatta
- Best goalkeeper: (Algeria) Raïs M'Bolhi
- Fair play award: Senegal

The 2019 Africa Cup of Nations (abbreviated as AFCON 2019 or CAN 2019), known as the Total 2019 Africa Cup of Nations for sponsorship reasons, was the 32nd edition of the Africa Cup of Nations, the biennial international men's football championship of Africa organized by the Confederation of African Football (CAF). The tournament was hosted by Egypt. The competition was held from 21 June to 19 July 2019, following the decision of the CAF Executive Committee on 20 July 2017 to move the event from January/February to June/July for the first time. It was also the first Africa Cup of Nations expanded from 16 to 24 teams.

The tournament was initially scheduled to be hosted by Cameroon. Cameroon would have hosted the competition for the first time since 1972. They were also the title holders after winning the 2017 tournament. On 30 November 2018, Cameroon was stripped of hosting the 2019 tournament due to delays in the delivery of infrastructure, the Boko Haram insurgency and the Anglophone Crisis. Instead, the country was given the right to host the 2021 tournament. On 8 January 2019, Egypt was chosen by the CAF Executive Committee as the host nation of the competition. The tournament was also moved from the original dates of 15 June – 13 July to 21 June – 19 July due to Ramadan.

Cameroon, the defending champions, were eliminated in the round of 16 by Nigeria. Hosts Egypt were eliminated at the same stage after losing 0–1 to South Africa. Algeria defeated Senegal 1–0 in the final, winning their second title and first since 1990, while Nigeria came third after beating Tunisia 1–0 in the third-place play-off match.

== Host selection ==
After the CAF Executive Committee meeting on 24 January 2014, it was announced that there were six official candidates for the 2019 edition:

Bids:

- Algeria
- Cameroon
- Ivory Coast

Rejected Bids:

- Guinea / Guinea-Bissau / Liberia / Sierra Leone
- Kenya / Uganda
- Malawi / Zambia / Zimbabwe
- Nigeria
- Senegal

This list was different from the list of the host nation bids for both the 2019 and 2021 edition of the Cup of Nations as announced by CAF in November 2013, with Gabon also on the original list, but Cameroon not on it. Among the six official candidates, Algeria, Guinea and Ivory Coast also bid for hosting the 2021 Africa Cup of Nations.

Democratic Republic of the Congo had originally put themselves forward as host candidates but withdrew in July 2014. Security concerns and threats from various militant groups particularly in the eastern part of the country were an early issue with a Congolese bid. Before bidding solo Guinea was part of a four-way joint bid with Guinea-Bissau, Sierra Leone and Liberia, similarly Zambia was originally part of a joint bid with Malawi and Zimbabwe. Other nations who expressed early interest in hosting were 2013 champions Nigeria, Senegal, and a joint bid of Kenya and Uganda.

The decision of the host country was postponed from early 2014 to grant each bidding country adequate time to receive the inspection delegation. After the final vote at the CAF Executive Committee meeting, on 20 September 2014, the CAF announced the hosts for the 2019, 2021 and 2023 AFCON tournaments: 2019 to Cameroon, 2021 to Ivory Coast, and 2023 to Guinea.

=== New bid process ===
It was expected that Cameroon would host this edition but it was sidelined by the CAF on 30 November 2018 in Accra, Ghana for non-compliance with the specifications, CAF announced that they would be receiving applications for the new hosts until 14 December 2018.

Bids:

- Egypt
- South Africa

The organization of the competition was finally awarded to Egypt on 8 January 2019 by the CAF Executive Committee meeting in Dakar, Senegal. Voters had a choice between two countries after Morocco's sports minister confirmed that his country was not interested in hosting: Egypt and South Africa.

North Africa will host the tournament for the first time in 13 years after being hosted by Egypt also in 2006.

This is the fifth time that Egypt will host the African Cup after 1959, 1974, 1986 and the 2006 to become the country that has hosted it for the most times in the continent.

Results
Nation(s)	Votes
Egypt	16
South Africa	1
Abstention	1
Total votes	18

== Prize money ==
The CAF increased in 2019, the prize money to be shared among the teams participating in the Africa Cup of Nations.

Final position	Prize money
Champions	US$4.5 million
Runners-up	US$2.5 million
Semi-finalists	US$2.0 million
Quarter-finalists	US$1.0 million

== Marketing ==
=== Sponsorship ===
Tut, the official mascot of the 2019 Africa Cup of Nations

In July 2016, Total secured an eight-year sponsorship package from the Confederation of African Football (CAF) to support 10 of its principal competitions. Total started with the Africa Cup of Nations that was held in Gabon in 2017 therefore renaming it to Total Africa Cup of Nations.

Title sponsor	Official sponsors	Regional sponsors
Total	1XBET; Orange; Visa; Gilead; Continental	Yamaha; Temmy's

=== Mascot ===
The organizing board of the 2019 African Cup of Nations revealed the AFCON 2019 Mascot; "Tut", which was inspired by the Egyptian Pharaoh Tutankhamun. His kit bears resemblance to Egypt's home colors, with the map of Africa visible on his shirt as well as the tournament's logo.

=== Match ball ===
Umbro replaced Mitre as the Cup of Nations match ball provider and the official match ball for this tournament, named Neo Pro, was unveiled on 29 May 2019.

== Qualification ==
Qualified Failed to qualify Withdrew or did not enter Not part of CAF

Due to Morocco withdrawing from being hosts of the 2015 edition, CAF banned the national team of Morocco from entering the 2017 and 2019 Africa Cups of Nations. However, the ban was overturned by the Court of Arbitration for Sport, meaning Morocco, having qualified for this edition of the African Cup of Nations, could participate in the tournament.

Due to the withdrawal of Chad during 2017 Africa Cup of Nations qualification, they were banned from entering the 2019 Africa Cup of Nations.

=== Qualified teams ===
The following teams qualified for the tournament:

Team	Method of qualification	Date of qualification	Finals appearance	Last appearance	Previous best performance	FIFA ranking at start of event
Egypt	Hosts / Group J runners-up	16 October 2018	24th	2017	Winners (1957, 1959, 1986, 1998, 2006, 2008, 2010)	58
Madagascar	Group A runners-up	16 October 2018	1st	None	Debut	108
Tunisia	Group J winners	16 October 2018	19th	2017	Winners (2004)	25
Senegal	Group A winners	16 October 2018	15th	2017	Runners-up (2002)	22
Morocco	Group B winners	17 November 2018	17th	2017	Winners (1976)	47
Nigeria	Group E winners	17 November 2018	18th	2013	Winners (1980, 1994, 2013)	45
Uganda	Group L winners	17 November 2018	7th	2017	Runners-up (1978)	80
Mali	Group C winners	17 November 2018	11th	2017	Runners-up (1972)	62
Guinea	Group H winners	18 November 2018	12th	2015	Runners-up (1976)	71
Algeria	Group D winners	18 November 2018	18th	2017	Winners (1990)	68
Mauritania	Group I runners-up	18 November 2018	1st	None	Debut	103
Ivory Coast	Group H runners-up	18 November 2018	23rd	2017	Winners (1992, 2015)	62
Kenya	Group F runners-up	30 November 2018	6th	2004	Group stage (1972, 1988, 1990, 1992, 2004)	105
Ghana	Group F winners	30 November 2018	22nd	2017	Winners (1963, 1965, 1978, 1982)	50
Angola	Group I winners	22 March 2019	8th	2013	Quarter-finals (2008, 2010)	123
Burundi	Group C runners-up	23 March 2019	1st	None	Debut	134
Cameroon	Group B runners-up	23 March 2019	19th	2017	Winners (1984, 1988, 2000, 2002, 2017)	51
Guinea-Bissau	Group K winners	23 March 2019	2nd	2017	Group stage (2017)	118
Namibia	Group K runners-up	23 March 2019	3rd	2008	Group stage (1998, 2008)	113
Zimbabwe	Group G winners	24 March 2019	4th	2017	Group stage (2004, 2006, 2017)	109
DR Congo	Group G runners-up	24 March 2019	19th	2017	Winners (1968, 1974)	49
Benin	Group D runners-up	24 March 2019	4th	2010	Group stage (2004, 2008, 2010)	88
Tanzania	Group L runners-up	24 March 2019	2nd	1980	Group stage (1980)	131
South Africa	Group E runners-up	24 March 2019	10th	2015	Winners (1996)	72

== Venues ==
Location of the host cities of the 2019 Africa Cup of Nations
1 Cairo
2 Alexandria
3 Ismailia
4 Suez

With the Africa Cup of Nations expanded from 16 to 24 teams, at least six venues were expected to be used. After the 2017 Africa Cup of Nations, the CAF agreed to increase the number of teams from 16 to 24, following the UEFA Euro 2016.

After being awarded the bid, initially Egypt chose eight stadiums to host the tournament. The eight stadiums were Cairo International Stadium and Al Salam Stadium in Cairo, Alexandria Stadium and Haras El Hodoud Stadium in Alexandria, Egyptian Army Stadium and Suez Stadium in Suez, Ismailia Stadium in Ismailia and Al Masry Club Stadium in Port Said. Later, Al Salam Stadium was replaced with 30 June Stadium, which was another stadium located in Cairo. It was expected that the famous Borg El Arab Stadium in Alexandria and Osman Ahmed Osman Stadium in Cairo would be used in the tournament, but they weren't selected.

On 17 February 2019, it was confirmed that only six stadiums would be used. The six venues were Cairo International Stadium and 30 June Stadium in Cairo, Alexandria Stadium in Alexandria, Suez Stadium in Suez, Ismailia Stadium in Ismailia and Al Masry Club Stadium in Port Said.

However, on 13 March 2019, Al Masry Club Stadium in Port Said was replaced by Al Salam Stadium in Cairo after discovering a problem with one of the stadium's main stands.

List of candidate host cities
City	Stadium	Capacity
Cairo	Cairo International Stadium	75,000
Cairo	30 June Stadium	30,000
Cairo	Al Salam Stadium	30,000
Alexandria	Alexandria Stadium	19,676
Ismailia	Ismailia Stadium	18,525
Suez	Suez Stadium	27,000

== Match officials ==
The following referees were chosen for the 2019 Africa Cup of Nations.

=== Referees ===
- (Algeria) Mustapha Ghorbal
- (Angola) Hélder Martins Rodrigues de Carvalho
- (Botswana) Joshua Bondo
- (Burundi) Pacifique Ndabihawenimana
- (Cameroon) Sidi Alioum
- (Egypt) Gehad Grisha
- (Egypt) Amin Omar
- (Egypt) Ibrahim Nour El Din
- (Ethiopia) Bamlak Tessema Weyesa
- (Gabon) Eric Otogo-Castane
- (The Gambia) Bakary Gassama
- (Kenya) Peter Waweru
- (Madagascar) Andofetra Rakotojaona
- (Mali) Mahamadou Keita
- (Mauritania) Beida Dahane
- (Mauritius) Ahmad Imetehaz Heeralall
- (Morocco) Noureddine El Jaafari
- (Morocco) Rédouane Jiyed
- (Democratic Republic of the Congo) Jean-Jacques Ndala
- (Rwanda) Louis Hakizimana
- (Senegal) Maguette Ndiaye
- (Senegal) Issa Sy
- (Seychelles) Bernard Camille
- (South Africa) Victor Gomes
- (Tunisia) Sadok Selmi
- (Tunisia) Youssef Essrayri
- (Tunisia) Haythem Guirat
- (Zambia) Janny Sikazwe

=== Assistant referees ===
- (Algeria) Mokrane Gourari
- (Algeria) Abdelhak Etchiali
- (Angola) Jerson Emiliano Dos Santos
- (Burkina Faso) Seydou Tiama
- (Cameroon) Nguegoue Elvis Guy Noupue
- (Cameroon) Evarist Menkouande
- (Chad) Issa Yaya
- (Comoros) Soulaimane Almadine
- (Egypt) Tahssen Abo El Sadat
- (Egypt) Abouelregal Mahmoud
- (Egypt) Ahmed Hossam Taha
- (Kenya) Timothy Kiprono Kirui
- (Eritrea) Tesfagiorghis Berhe
- (Ethiopia) Samuel Temesgin
- (Guinea) Sidibe Sidiki
- (Kenya) Gilbert Cheruiyot
- (Lesotho) Souru Phatsoane
- (Libya) Attia Amsaaed
- (Madagascar) Lionel Andrianantenaina
- (Morocco) Azgaou Lahcen
- (Morocco) Mustapha Akarkad
- (Mozambique) Arsenio Maringule
- (Niger) Mahamadou Yahaya
- (Nigeria) Baba Adel
- (Democratic Republic of the Congo) Oliver Safari
- (Senegal) El Hadji Malick Samba
- (South Africa) Zakhele Thusi Siwela
- (Sudan) Mohammed Ibrahim
- (Sudan) Waleed Ahmed Ali
- (Tunisia) Yamen Mellouchi
- (Tunisia) Anouar Hmila
- (Uganda) Mark Ssonko

=== Video assistant referees ===
The EFA announced the video assistant referees (VARs) would be introduced during the 2019 Africa Cup of Nations, starting from the quarter-finals.

- (France) Benoît Millot (UEFA)
- (Netherlands) Pol van Boekel (UEFA)

== Squads ==
Each team had to register a squad of 23 players (Regulations Article 72).

== Format ==
Only the hosts received an automatic qualification spot, with the other 23 teams qualifying through a qualification tournament. At the finals, the 24 teams were drawn into six groups of four teams each. The teams in each group played a single round robin. After the group stage, the top two teams and the four best third-placed teams advanced to the round of 16. The winners advanced to the quarter-finals. The winners of the quarter-finals advanced to the semi-finals. The losers of the semi-finals played in a third place play-off, while winners of the semi-finals played in the final.

== Draw ==
The draw took place on 12 April 2019, 20:00 CAT (UTC+2), facing the Sphinx and the Pyramids in Giza, Egypt. The 24 teams were drawn into six groups of four teams.

The draw procedure was approved by the CAF Executive Committee on 11 April 2019. For the draw, the teams were allocated to four pots based on the FIFA World Rankings of April 2019 (shown in parentheses). Hosts Egypt were automatically assigned to position A1. Defending champions Cameroon were also automatically placed into Pot 1.

Pot 1	Pot 2	Pot 3	Pot 4
Egypt (57) (hosts); Cameroon (54) (title holders); Senegal (23); Tunisia (28); Nigeria (42); Morocco (45)	DR Congo (46); Ghana (49); Mali (65); Ivory Coast (65); Guinea (68); Algeria (70)	South Africa (73); Uganda (79); Benin (91); Mauritania (103); Madagascar (107); Kenya (108)	Zimbabwe (110); Namibia (113); Guinea-Bissau (118); Angola (122); Tanzania (131); Burundi (136)

== Group stage ==
The top two teams of each group, along with the best four third-placed teams, advanced to the round of 16.

All times are local, CAT (UTC+2).

=== Tiebreakers ===
Teams were ranked according to points (3 points for a win, 1 point for a draw, 0 points for a loss), and if tied on points, the following tiebreaking criteria were applied, in the order given, to determine the rankings (Regulations Article 74):

1. Points in head-to-head matches among tied teams;
2. Goal difference in head-to-head matches among tied teams;
3. Goals scored in head-to-head matches among tied teams;
4. If more than two teams were tied, and after applying all head-to-head criteria above, a subset of teams were still tied, all head-to-head criteria above were reapplied exclusively to this subset of teams;
5. Goal difference in all group matches;
6. Goals scored in all group matches;
7. Drawing of lots.

=== Group A ===
Pos	Team	Pld	W	D	L	GF	GA	GD	Pts	Qualification
1	Egypt (H)	3	3	0	0	5	0	+5	9	Advance to knockout stage
2	Uganda	3	1	1	1	3	3	0	4	Advance to knockout stage
3	DR Congo	3	1	0	2	4	4	0	3	Advance to knockout stage
4	Zimbabwe	3	0	1	2	1	6	−5	1	

Source: CAF
(H) Hosts
21 June 2019
22:00

Egypt	1–0	Zimbabwe
Trézéguet 41'	Report

Cairo International Stadium, Cairo
Attendance: 73,299
Referee: Sidi Alioum (Cameroon)
22 June 2019
16:30

DR Congo	0–2	Uganda
	Report	Kaddu 14'; Okwi 48'

Cairo International Stadium, Cairo
Attendance: 1,083
Referee: Rédouane Jiyed (Morocco)

26 June 2019
19:00

Uganda	1–1	Zimbabwe
Okwi 12'	Report	Billiat 40'

Cairo International Stadium, Cairo
Attendance: 73,589
Referee: Eric Otogo-Castane (Gabon)
26 June 2019
22:00

Egypt	2–0	DR Congo
A. Elmohamady 25'; Salah 43'	Report

Cairo International Stadium, Cairo
Attendance: 74,219
Referee: Victor Gomes (South Africa)

30 June 2019
21:00

Uganda	0–2	Egypt
	Report	Salah 36'; A. Elmohamady 45+1'

Cairo International Stadium, Cairo
Attendance: 74,566
Referee: Maguette Ndiaye (Senegal)
30 June 2019
21:00

Zimbabwe	0–4	DR Congo
	Report	Bolingi 4'; Bakambu 34', 65' (pen.); Assombalonga 78'

30 June Stadium, Cairo
Attendance: 4,364
Referee: Mustapha Ghorbal (Algeria)

=== Group B ===
Pos	Team	Pld	W	D	L	GF	GA	GD	Pts	Qualification
1	Madagascar	3	2	1	0	5	2	+3	7	Advance to knockout stage
2	Nigeria	3	2	0	1	2	2	0	6	Advance to knockout stage
3	Guinea	3	1	1	1	4	3	+1	4	Advance to knockout stage
4	Burundi	3	0	0	3	0	4	−4	0	

Source: CAF
22 June 2019
19:00

Nigeria	1–0	Burundi
Ighalo 77'	Report

Alexandria Stadium, Alexandria
Attendance: 3,192
Referee: Bernard Camille (Seychelles)
22 June 2019
22:00

Guinea	2–2	Madagascar
Kaba 34'; Kamano 66' (pen.)	Report	Abel 49'; Andriamatsinoro 55'

Alexandria Stadium, Alexandria
Attendance: 5,342
Referee: Amin Omar (Egypt)

26 June 2019
16:30

Nigeria	1–0	Guinea
Omeruo 73'	Report

Alexandria Stadium, Alexandria
Attendance: 10,388
Referee: Helder Martins de Carvalho (Angola)
27 June 2019
16:30

Madagascar	1–0	Burundi
Ilaimaharitra 76'	Report

Alexandria Stadium, Alexandria
Attendance: 4,900
Referee: Haythem Guirat (Tunisia)

30 June 2019
18:00

Madagascar	2–0	Nigeria
Nomenjanahary 13'; Andriamatsinoro 53'	Report

Alexandria Stadium, Alexandria
Attendance: 9,895
Referee: Bakary Gassama (Gambia)
30 June 2019
18:00

Burundi	0–2	Guinea
	Report	Yattara 25', 52'

Al Salam Stadium, Cairo
Attendance: 5,753
Referee: Noureddine El Jaafari (Morocco)

=== Group C ===
Pos	Team	Pld	W	D	L	GF	GA	GD	Pts	Qualification
1	Algeria	3	3	0	0	6	0	+6	9	Advance to knockout stage
2	Senegal	3	2	0	1	5	1	+4	6	Advance to knockout stage
3	Kenya	3	1	0	2	3	7	−4	3	
4	Tanzania	3	0	0	3	2	8	−6	0	

Source: CAF
23 June 2019
19:00

Senegal	2–0	Tanzania
Keita 28'; Diatta 64'	Report

30 June Stadium, Cairo
Attendance: 7,249
Referee: Sadok Selmi (Tunisia)
23 June 2019
22:00

Algeria	2–0	Kenya
Bounedjah 34' (pen.); Mahrez 43'	Report

30 June Stadium, Cairo
Attendance: 8,071
Referee: Mahamadou Keita (Mali)

27 June 2019
19:00

Senegal	0–1	Algeria
	Report	Belaïli 49'

30 June Stadium, Cairo
Attendance: 25,765
Referee: Janny Sikazwe (Zambia)
27 June 2019
22:00

Kenya	3–2	Tanzania
Olunga 39', 80'; Omolo 62'	Report	Msuva 6'; Samatta 40'

30 June Stadium, Cairo
Attendance: 7,233
Referee: Ahmad Heeralall (Mauritius)

1 July 2019
21:00

Kenya	0–3	Senegal
	Report	Sarr 63'; Mané 71', 78' (pen.)

30 June Stadium, Cairo
Attendance: 13,224
Referee: Gehad Grisha (Egypt)
1 July 2019
21:00

Tanzania	0–3	Algeria
	Report	Slimani 35'; Ounas 39', 45+1'

Al Salam Stadium, Cairo
Attendance: 8,921
Referee: Andofetra Rakotojaona (Madagascar)

=== Group D ===
Pos	Team	Pld	W	D	L	GF	GA	GD	Pts	Qualification
1	Morocco	3	3	0	0	3	0	+3	9	Advance to knockout stage
2	Ivory Coast	3	2	0	1	5	2	+3	6	Advance to knockout stage
3	South Africa	3	1	0	2	1	2	−1	3	Advance to knockout stage
4	Namibia	3	0	0	3	1	6	−5	0	

Source: CAF
23 June 2019
16:30

Morocco	1–0	Namibia
Keimuine 89' (o.g.)	Report

Al Salam Stadium, Cairo
Attendance: 6,857
Referee: Louis Hakizimana (Rwanda)
24 June 2019
16:30

Ivory Coast	1–0	South Africa
Kodjia 64'	Report

Al Salam Stadium, Cairo
Attendance: 4,961
Referee: Mustapha Ghorbal (Algeria)

28 June 2019
19:00

Morocco	1–0	Ivory Coast
En-Nesyri 23'	Report

Al Salam Stadium, Cairo
Attendance: 27,500
Referee: Sidi Alioum (Cameroon)
28 June 2019
22:00

South Africa	1–0	Namibia
Zungu 68'	Report

Al Salam Stadium, Cairo
Attendance: 16,090
Referee: Issa Sy (Senegal)

1 July 2019
18:00

South Africa	0–1	Morocco
	Report	Boussoufa 90'

Al Salam Stadium, Cairo
Attendance: 12,098
Referee: Jean-Jacques Ndala (DR Congo)
1 July 2019
18:00

Namibia	1–4	Ivory Coast
Kamatuka 71'	Report	Gradel 39'; Dié 58'; Zaha 84'; Cornet 89'

30 June Stadium, Cairo
Attendance: 7,530
Referee: Peter Waweru (Kenya)

=== Group E ===
Pos	Team	Pld	W	D	L	GF	GA	GD	Pts	Qualification
1	Mali	3	2	1	0	6	2	+4	7	Advance to knockout stage
2	Tunisia	3	0	3	0	2	2	0	3	Advance to knockout stage
3	Angola	3	0	2	1	1	2	−1	2	
4	Mauritania	3	0	2	1	1	4	−3	2	

Source: CAF
24 June 2019
19:00

Tunisia	1–1	Angola
Msakni 34' (pen.)	Report	Djalma 73'

Suez Stadium, Suez
Attendance: 7,345
Referee: Bamlak Tessema Weyesa (Ethiopia)
24 June 2019
22:00

Mali	4–1	Mauritania
Diaby 37'; Marega 45' (pen.); A. Traoré II 55'; A. Traoré I 74'	Report	El Hacen 72' (pen.)

Suez Stadium, Suez
Attendance: 6,202
Referee: Jean-Jacques Ndala (DR Congo)

28 June 2019
16:30

Tunisia	1–1	Mali
Khazri 70'	Report	Samassékou 60'

Suez Stadium, Suez
Attendance: 16,085
Referee: Joshua Bondo (Botswana)
29 June 2019
16:30

Mauritania	0–0	Angola
	Report

Suez Stadium, Suez
Attendance: 10,120
Referee: Ibrahim Nour El Din (Egypt)

2 July 2019
21:00

Mauritania	0–0	Tunisia
	Report

Suez Stadium, Suez
Attendance: 7,732
Referee: Louis Hakizimana (Rwanda)
2 July 2019
21:00

Angola	0–1	Mali
	Report	Haidara 37'

Ismailia Stadium, Ismailia
Attendance: 8,135
Referee: Redouane Jiyed (Morocco)

=== Group F ===
Pos	Team	Pld	W	D	L	GF	GA	GD	Pts	Qualification
1	Ghana	3	1	2	0	4	2	+2	5	Advance to knockout stage
2	Cameroon	3	1	2	0	2	0	+2	5	Advance to knockout stage
3	Benin	3	0	3	0	2	2	0	3	Advance to knockout stage
4	Guinea-Bissau	3	0	1	2	0	4	−4	1	

Source: CAF
25 June 2019
19:00

Cameroon	2–0	Guinea-Bissau
Yaya 66'; Bahoken 69'	Report

Ismailia Stadium, Ismailia
Attendance: 5,983
Referee: Noureddine El Jaafari (Morocco)
25 June 2019
22:00

Ghana	2–2	Benin
A. Ayew 9'; J. Ayew 42'	Report	Poté 2', 63'

Ismailia Stadium, Ismailia
Attendance: 8,094
Referee: Youssef Essrayri (Tunisia)

29 June 2019
19:00

Cameroon	0–0	Ghana
	Report

Ismailia Stadium, Ismailia
Attendance: 16,724
Referee: Bamlak Tessema Weyesa (Ethiopia)
29 June 2019
22:00

Benin	0–0	Guinea-Bissau
	Report

Ismailia Stadium, Ismailia
Attendance: 9,212
Referee: Pacifique Ndabihawenimana (Burundi)

2 July 2019
18:00

Benin	0–0	Cameroon
	Report

Ismailia Stadium, Ismailia
Attendance: 14,120
Referee: Sadok Selmi (Tunisia)
2 July 2019
18:00

Guinea-Bissau	0–2	Ghana
	Report	J. Ayew 46'; Partey 72'

Suez Stadium, Suez
Attendance: 6,905
Referee: Eric Otogo-Castane (Gabon)

=== Ranking of third-placed teams ===
Pos	Grp	Team	Pld	W	D	L	GF	GA	GD	Pts	Qualification
1	B	Guinea	3	1	1	1	4	3	+1	4	Advance to knockout stage
2	A	DR Congo	3	1	0	2	4	4	0	3	Advance to knockout stage
3	F	Benin	3	0	3	0	2	2	0	3	Advance to knockout stage
4	D	South Africa	3	1	0	2	1	2	−1	3	Advance to knockout stage
5	C	Kenya	3	1	0	2	3	7	−4	3	
6	E	Angola	3	0	2	1	1	2	−1	2	

Source: CAF
Rules for classification: 1) Points; 2) Goal difference; 3) Goals scored; 4) Disciplinary points; 5) Drawing of lots.

== Knockout stage ==
In the knockout stage, extra time and a penalty shoot-out were used to decide the winner if necessary, except for the third place match, where a direct penalty shoot-out, without any extra time, was used to decide the winner if necessary (Regulations Article 75).

=== Bracket ===
Round of 16
5 July – Cairo (International)
Uganda	0
Senegal	1
5 July – Cairo (Al Salam)
Morocco	1 (1)
Benin (p)	1 (4)
7 July – Alexandria
Madagascar (p)	2 (4)
DR Congo	2 (2)
8 July – Ismailia
Ghana	1 (4)
Tunisia (p)	1 (5)
8 July – Suez
Mali	0
Ivory Coast	1
7 July – Cairo (30 June)
Algeria	3
Guinea	0
6 July – Alexandria
Nigeria	3
Cameroon	2
6 July – Cairo (International)
Egypt	0
South Africa	1

Quarter-finals
10 July – Cairo (30 June)
Senegal	1
Benin	0
11 July – Cairo (Al Salam)
Madagascar	0
Tunisia	3
11 July – Suez
Ivory Coast	1 (3)
Algeria (p)	1 (4)
10 July – Cairo (International)
Nigeria	2
South Africa	1

Semi-finals
14 July – Cairo (30 June)
Senegal (a.e.t.)	1
Tunisia	0
14 July – Cairo (International)
Algeria	2
Nigeria	1

Final
19 July – Cairo (International)
Senegal	0
Algeria	1
Third place play-off
17 July – Cairo (Al Salam)
Tunisia	0
Nigeria	1

=== Round of 16 ===
5 July 2019
18:00

Morocco	1–1 (a.e.t.)	Benin
En-Nesyri 76'	Report	Adilehou 53'
Penalties
Idrissi (penalty scored); Boufal (penalty missed); En-Nesyri (penalty missed)	1–4	(penalty scored) Verdon; (penalty scored) Djigla; (penalty scored) Anaane; (penalty scored) Séïbou

Al Salam Stadium, Cairo
Attendance: 7,500
Referee: Hélder Martins de Carvalho (Angola)

5 July 2019
21:00

Uganda	0–1	Senegal
	Report	Mané 15'

Cairo International Stadium, Cairo
Attendance: 6,950
Referee: Mustapha Ghorbal (Algeria)

6 July 2019
18:00

Nigeria	3–2	Cameroon
Ighalo 19', 63'; Iwobi 66'	Report	Bahoken 41'; N'Jie 44'

Alexandria Stadium, Alexandria
Attendance: 10,000
Referee: Joshua Bondo (Botswana)

6 July 2019
21:00

Egypt	0–1	South Africa
	Report	Lorch 85'

Cairo International Stadium, Cairo
Attendance: 75,000
Referee: Eric Otogo-Castane (Gabon)

7 July 2019
18:00

Madagascar	2–2 (a.e.t.)	DR Congo
Amada 9'; Andriatsima 77'	Report	Bakambu 21'; Mbemba 90'
Penalties
Amada (penalty scored); Métanire (penalty scored); Fontaine (penalty scored); Mombris (penalty scored)	4–2	(penalty missed) Tisserand; (penalty scored) Bakambu; (penalty scored) M'Poku; (penalty missed) Bolasie

Alexandria Stadium, Alexandria
Attendance: 5,890
Referee: Noureddine El Jaafari (Morocco)

7 July 2019
21:00

Algeria	3–0	Guinea
Belaïli 24'; Mahrez 57'; Ounas 82'	Report

30 June Stadium, Cairo
Attendance: 8,205
Referee: Bernard Camille (Seychelles)

8 July 2019
18:00

Mali	0–1	Ivory Coast
	Report	Zaha 76'

Suez Stadium, Suez
Attendance: 7,672
Referee: Janny Sikazwe (Zambia)

8 July 2019
21:00

Ghana	1–1 (a.e.t.)	Tunisia
Bedoui 90+2' (o.g.)	Report	Khenissi 73'
Penalties
Wakaso (penalty scored); J. Ayew (penalty scored); Ekuban (penalty missed); Agbenyenu (penalty scored); Partey (penalty scored)	4–5	(penalty scored) Sliti; (penalty scored) Khazri; (penalty scored) Bronn; (penalty scored) Meriah; (penalty scored) Sassi

Ismailia Stadium, Ismailia
Attendance: 8,890
Referee: Victor Gomes (South Africa)

=== Quarter-finals ===
10 July 2019
18:00

Senegal	1–0	Benin
Gueye 70'	Report

30 June Stadium, Cairo
Attendance: 5,798
Referee: Mustapha Ghorbal (Algeria)

10 July 2019
21:00

Nigeria	2–1	South Africa
Chukwueze 27'; Troost-Ekong 89'	Report	Zungu 71'

Cairo International Stadium, Cairo
Attendance: 48,343
Referee: Rédouane Jiyed (Morocco)

11 July 2019
18:00

Ivory Coast	1–1 (a.e.t.)	Algeria
Kodjia 62'	Report	Feghouli 20'
Penalties
Kessié (penalty scored); Cornet (penalty scored); Bony (penalty missed); Gradel (penalty scored); Dié (penalty missed)	3–4	(penalty scored) Bensebaini; (penalty scored) Slimani; (penalty scored) Delort; (penalty scored) Ounas; (penalty missed) Belaïli

Suez Stadium, Suez
Attendance: 8,233
Referee: Bamlak Tessema Weyesa (Ethiopia)

11 July 2019
21:00

Madagascar	0–3	Tunisia
	Report	Sassi 52'; Msakni 60'; Sliti 90+3'

Al Salam Stadium, Cairo
Attendance: 7,568
Referee: Sidi Alioum (Cameroon)

=== Semi-finals ===
14 July 2019
18:00

Senegal	1–0 (a.e.t.)	Tunisia
Bronn 101' (o.g.)	Report

30 June Stadium, Cairo
Attendance: 9,143
Referee: Bamlak Tessema Weyesa (Ethiopia)

14 July 2019
21:00

Algeria	2–1	Nigeria
Troost-Ekong 40' (o.g.); Mahrez 90+5'	Report	Ighalo 72' (pen.)

Cairo International Stadium, Cairo
Attendance: 49,775
Referee: Bakary Gassama (Gambia)

=== Third place play-off ===
17 July 2019
21:00

Tunisia	0–1	Nigeria
	Report	Ighalo 3'

Al Salam Stadium, Cairo
Attendance: 6,340
Referee: Gehad Grisha (Egypt)

=== Final ===
19 July 2019
21:00

Senegal	0–1	Algeria
	Report	Bounedjah 2'

Cairo International Stadium, Cairo
Attendance: 75,000
Referee: Sidi Alioum (Cameroon)

== Statistics ==
=== Goalscorers ===
There were 102 goals scored in 52 matches, for an average of 1.96 goals per match.

5 goals

- (Nigeria) Odion Ighalo

3 goals

- (Algeria) Riyad Mahrez
- (Algeria) Adam Ounas
- (Democratic Republic of the Congo) Cédric Bakambu
- (Senegal) Sadio Mané

2 goals

- (Algeria) Youcef Belaïli
- (Algeria) Baghdad Bounedjah
- (Benin) Mickaël Poté
- (Cameroon) Stéphane Bahoken
- (Egypt) Ahmed El Mohamady
- (Egypt) Mohamed Salah
- (Ghana) Jordan Ayew
- (Guinea) Mohamed Yattara
- (Ivory Coast) Jonathan Kodjia
- (Ivory Coast) Wilfried Zaha
- (Kenya) Michael Olunga
- (Madagascar) Carolus Andriamatsinoro
- (Morocco) Youssef En-Nesyri
- (South Africa) Bongani Zungu
- (Tunisia) Youssef Msakni
- (Uganda) Emmanuel Okwi

1 goal

- (Algeria) Sofiane Feghouli
- (Algeria) Islam Slimani
- (Angola) Djalma
- (Benin) Moise Adilehou
- (Cameroon) Clinton N'Jie
- (Cameroon) Banana Yaya
- (Democratic Republic of the Congo) Britt Assombalonga
- (Democratic Republic of the Congo) Jonathan Bolingi
- (Democratic Republic of the Congo) Chancel Mbemba
- (Egypt) Trézéguet
- (Ghana) André Ayew
- (Ghana) Thomas Partey
- (Guinea) Sory Kaba
- (Guinea) François Kamano
- (Ivory Coast) Maxwel Cornet
- (Ivory Coast) Serey Dié
- (Ivory Coast) Max Gradel
- (Kenya) Johanna Omolo
- (Madagascar) Anicet Abel
- (Madagascar) Ibrahim Amada
- (Madagascar) Faneva Imà Andriatsima
- (Madagascar) Marco Ilaimaharitra
- (Madagascar) Lalaïna Nomenjanahary
- (Mali) Abdoulay Diaby
- (Mali) Amadou Haidara
- (Mali) Moussa Marega
- (Mali) Diadie Samassékou
- (Mali) Adama Traoré I
- (Mali) Adama Traoré II
- (Mauritania) Moctar Sidi El Hacen
- (Morocco) Mbark Boussoufa
- (Namibia) Joslin Kamatuka
- (Nigeria) Samuel Chukwueze
- (Nigeria) Alex Iwobi
- (Nigeria) Kenneth Omeruo
- (Nigeria) William Troost-Ekong
- (Senegal) Keita Baldé
- (Senegal) Krépin Diatta
- (Senegal) Idrissa Gueye
- (Senegal) Ismaïla Sarr
- (South Africa) Thembinkosi Lorch
- (Tanzania) Simon Msuva
- (Tanzania) Mbwana Samatta
- (Tunisia) Wahbi Khazri
- (Tunisia) Taha Yassine Khenissi
- (Tunisia) Ferjani Sassi
- (Tunisia) Naïm Sliti
- (Uganda) Patrick Kaddu
- (Zimbabwe) Khama Billiat

1 own goal

- (Namibia) Itamunua Keimuine (against Morocco)
- (Nigeria) William Troost-Ekong (against Algeria)
- (Tunisia) Rami Bedoui (against Ghana)
- (Tunisia) Dylan Bronn (against Senegal)

=== Discipline ===
A player was automatically suspended for the next match for the following offences:

- Receiving a red card (red card suspensions could be extended for serious offences)
- Receiving two yellow cards in two matches
- After the end of the group matches, all cautions received were cancelled for the rest of the competition. Nevertheless, a player having collected two yellow cards sustained the one match suspension.

The following suspensions occurred during the tournament:

Player(s)/Official(s)	Offence(s)	Suspension(s)
Group stage suspensions
(Ghana) John Boye	(yellow card) (yellow-red card) in Group F vs Benin (matchday 1; 25 June 2019)	Group F vs Cameroon (matchday 2; 29 June 2019)
(Democratic Republic of the Congo) Merveille Bokadi	(yellow card) in Group A vs Uganda (matchday 1; 22 June 2019); (yellow card) in Group A vs Egypt (matchday 2; 26 June 2019)	Group A vs Zimbabwe (matchday 3; 30 June 2019)
(Egypt) Mahmoud Alaa	(yellow card) in Group A vs Zimbabwe (matchday 1; 21 June 2019); (yellow card) in Group A vs DR Congo (matchday 2; 26 June 2019)	Group A vs Uganda (matchday 3; 30 June 2019)
(Tunisia) Ghailene Chaalali	(yellow card) in Group E vs Angola (matchday 1; 24 June 2019); (yellow card) in Group E vs Mali (matchday 2; 28 June 2019)	Group E vs Mauritania (matchday 3; 2 July 2019)
(Ghana) Kasim Nuhu	(yellow card) in Group F vs Benin (matchday 1; 25 June 2019); (yellow card) in Group F vs Cameroon (matchday 2; 29 June 2019)	Group F vs Guinea-Bissau (matchday 3; 2 July 2019)
(Burundi) Christophe Nduwarugira	(red card) in Group B vs Guinea (matchday 3; 30 June 2019)	Suspension served outside tournament
(Kenya) Philemon Otieno	(red card) in Group C vs Senegal (matchday 3; 1 July 2019)	Suspension served outside tournament
Knockout stage suspensions
(Madagascar) Marco Ilaimaharitra	(yellow card) in Group B vs Guinea (matchday 1; 22 June 2019); (yellow card) in Group B vs Nigeria (matchday 3; 30 June 2019)	Round of 16 vs DR Congo (7 July 2019)
(South Africa) Themba Zwane	(yellow card) in Group D vs Namibia (matchday 2; 28 June 2019); (yellow card) in Group D vs Morocco (matchday 3; 1 July 2019)	Round of 16 vs Egypt (6 July 2019)
(Benin) Steve Mounié	(yellow card) in Group F vs Ghana (matchday 1; 25 June 2019); (yellow card) in Group F vs Cameroon (matchday 3; 2 July 2019)	Round of 16 vs Morocco (5 July 2019)
(Benin) Khaled Adénon	(yellow card) (yellow-red card) in Round of 16 vs Morocco (5 July 2019)	Quarter-finals vs Senegal (10 July 2019)
(Benin) Olivier Verdon	(red card) in Quarter-finals vs Senegal (10 July 2019)	Suspension served outside tournament
(Senegal) Kalidou Koulibaly	(yellow card) in Round of 16 vs Uganda (5 July 2019); (yellow card) in Semi-finals vs Tunisia (14 July 2019)	Final vs Algeria (19 July 2019)
(Nigeria) Chidozie Awaziem	(yellow card) in Round of 16 vs Cameroon (6 July 2019); (yellow card) in Semi-finals vs Algeria (14 July 2019)	Third place play-off vs Tunisia (17 July 2019)

== Awards ==
The following awards were given at the conclusion of the tournament:

Total Man of the Competition
(Algeria) Ismaël Bennacer
Top scorer
(Nigeria) Odion Ighalo
(5 goals)
Best Goalkeeper
(Algeria) Raïs M'Bolhi
Best Young Player
(Senegal) Krépin Diatta
CAF Fair Play Team
Senegal

CAF AFCON Team of the Tournament

Goalkeeper	Defenders	Midfielders	Forwards	Coach
(Algeria) Raïs M'Bolhi	(Senegal) Kalidou Koulibaly (Tunisia) Yassine Meriah (Senegal) Lamine Gassama (Senegal) Youssouf Sabaly	(Senegal) Idrissa Gueye (Algeria) Adlène Guedioura (Algeria) Ismaël Bennacer	(Nigeria) Odion Ighalo (Senegal) Sadio Mané (Algeria) Riyad Mahrez	(Algeria) Djamel Belmadi

=== Tournament rankings ===
Ranking criteria
For teams eliminated in the same knockout round, the following criteria are applied, in the order given, to determine the final rankings:
1. Goal difference in round eliminated;
2. Goals scored in round eliminated;
3. If teams eliminated in the semi-finals or quarter-finals are tied, the above criteria are reapplied for the previous knockout round, with this process repeated once more should two semi-finalists remain tied;
4. Points in group stage;
5. Goal difference in group stage;
6. Goals scored in group stage;
7. Disciplinary points.

For teams eliminated in the group stage, the following criteria are applied, in the order given, to determine the final rankings:

1. Position in group;
2. Points;
3. Goal difference;
4. Goals scored;
5. Disciplinary points.

Pos.	Team	G	Pld	W	D	L	Pts	GF	GA	GD
1	Algeria	C	7	6	1	0	19	13	2	+11
2	Senegal	C	7	5	0	2	15	8	2	+6
3	Nigeria	B	7	5	0	2	15	9	7	+2
4	Tunisia	E	7	1	4	2	7	6	5	+1
Eliminated in the quarter-finals
5	Ivory Coast	D	5	3	1	1	10	7	3	+4
6	Madagascar	B	5	2	2	1	8	7	7	0
7	South Africa	D	5	2	0	3	6	3	4	−1
8	Benin	F	5	0	4	1	4	3	4	−1
Eliminated in the round of 16
9	Morocco	D	4	3	1	0	10	4	1	+3
10	Egypt	A	4	3	0	1	9	5	1	+4
11	Mali	E	4	2	1	1	7	6	3	+3
12	Ghana	F	4	1	3	0	6	5	3	+2
13	Cameroon	F	4	1	2	1	5	4	3	+1
14	DR Congo	A	4	1	1	2	4	6	6	0
15	Uganda	A	4	1	1	2	4	3	4	−1
16	Guinea	B	4	1	1	2	4	4	6	−2
Eliminated in the group stage
17	Kenya	C	3	1	0	2	3	3	7	−4
18	Angola	E	3	0	2	1	2	1	2	−1
19	Mauritania	E	3	0	2	1	2	1	4	−3
20	Zimbabwe	A	3	0	1	2	1	1	6	−5
21	Guinea-Bissau	F	3	0	1	2	1	0	4	−4
22	Burundi	B	3	0	0	3	0	0	4	−4
23	Namibia	D	3	0	0	3	0	1	6	−5
24	Tanzania	C	3	0	0	3	0	2	8	−6
