= 2014 FIFA World Cup officials =

In March 2013, FIFA published a list of 52 prospective referees, each paired, on the basis of nationality, with two assistant referees, from all six football confederations for the 2014 FIFA World Cup tournament. On 14 January 2014, the FIFA Referees Committee appointed 25 referee trios and eight support duos representing 43 countries for the tournament.

Confederation	Referee	Assistants		Support (referee/assist)
AFC	Ravshan Irmatov (Uzbekistan)	Abdukhamidullo Rasulov (Uzbekistan)	Bahadyr Kochkarov (Kyrgyzstan)	Alireza Faghani (Iran) / Hassan Kamranifar (Iran)
AFC	Yuichi Nishimura (Japan)	Toru Sagara (Japan)	Toshiyuki Nagi (Japan)	Alireza Faghani (Iran) / Hassan Kamranifar (Iran)
AFC	Nawaf Shukralla (Bahrain)	Yaser Tulefat (Bahrain)	Ebrahim Saleh (Bahrain)	Alireza Faghani (Iran) / Hassan Kamranifar (Iran)
AFC	Ben Williams (Australia)	Matthew Cream (Australia)	Hakan Anaz (Australia)	Alireza Faghani (Iran) / Hassan Kamranifar (Iran)
CAF	Noumandiez Doué (Ivory Coast)	Songuifolo Yeo (Ivory Coast)	Jean-Claude Birumushahu (Burundi)	Néant Alioum (Cameroon) / Djibril Camara (Senegal): ^{2}/ Aden Marwa (Kenya)
CAF	Bakary Gassama (Gambia)	Evarist Menkouande (Cameroon)	Félicien Kabanda (Rwanda)	Néant Alioum (Cameroon) / Djibril Camara (Senegal): ^{2}/ Aden Marwa (Kenya)
CAF	Djamel Haimoudi (Algeria)	Redouane Achik (Morocco)	Abdelhak Etchiali (Algeria)	Néant Alioum (Cameroon) / Djibril Camara (Senegal): ^{2}/ Aden Marwa (Kenya)
CONCACAF	Joel Aguilar (El Salvador)	William Torres (El Salvador)	Juan Zumba (El Salvador)	Roberto Moreno (Panama) / Eric Boria (United States); Walter López (Guatemala) / Leonel Leal (Costa Rica)
CONCACAF	Mark Geiger (United States)	Mark Hurd (United States)	Joe Fletcher (Canada)	Roberto Moreno (Panama) / Eric Boria (United States); Walter López (Guatemala) / Leonel Leal (Costa Rica)
CONCACAF	Marco Rodríguez (Mexico)	Marvin Torrentera (Mexico)	Marcos Quintero (Mexico)	Roberto Moreno (Panama) / Eric Boria (United States); Walter López (Guatemala) / Leonel Leal (Costa Rica)
CONMEBOL	Néstor Pitana (Argentina)	Hernán Maidana (Argentina)	Juan Pablo Belatti (Argentina)	Víctor Hugo Carrillo (Peru) / Rodney Aquino (Paraguay)
CONMEBOL	Sandro Ricci (Brazil)	Emerson de Carvalho (Brazil)	Marcelo Van Gasse (Brazil)	Víctor Hugo Carrillo (Peru) / Rodney Aquino (Paraguay)
CONMEBOL	Enrique Osses (Chile)	Carlos Astroza (Chile)	Sergio Román (Chile)	Víctor Hugo Carrillo (Peru) / Rodney Aquino (Paraguay)
CONMEBOL	Wilmar Roldán (Colombia)	Humberto Clavijo (Colombia)	Eduardo Díaz (Colombia)	Víctor Hugo Carrillo (Peru) / Rodney Aquino (Paraguay)
CONMEBOL	Carlos Vera (Ecuador)	Christian Lescano (Ecuador)	Byron Romero (Ecuador)	Víctor Hugo Carrillo (Peru) / Rodney Aquino (Paraguay)
OFC	Peter O'Leary (New Zealand)	Jan Hendrik Hintz (New Zealand)	Mark Rule (New Zealand)^{1}	Norbert Hauata (Tahiti) / -
UEFA	Felix Brych (Germany)	Mark Borsch (Germany)	Stefan Lupp (Germany)	Svein Oddvar Moen (Norway) / Kim Haglund (Norway)
UEFA	Cüneyt Çakır (Turkey)	Bahattin Duran (Turkey)	Tarık Ongun (Turkey)	Svein Oddvar Moen (Norway) / Kim Haglund (Norway)
UEFA	Jonas Eriksson (Sweden)	Mathias Klasenius (Sweden)	Daniel Wärnmark (Sweden)	Svein Oddvar Moen (Norway) / Kim Haglund (Norway)
UEFA	Björn Kuipers (Netherlands)	Sander van Roekel (Netherlands)	Erwin Zeinstra (Netherlands)	Svein Oddvar Moen (Norway) / Kim Haglund (Norway)
UEFA	Milorad Mažić (Serbia)	Milovan Ristić (Serbia)	Dalibor Đurđević (Serbia)	Svein Oddvar Moen (Norway) / Kim Haglund (Norway)
UEFA	Pedro Proença (Portugal)	Bertino Miranda (Portugal)	Tiago Trigo (Portugal)	Svein Oddvar Moen (Norway) / Kim Haglund (Norway)
UEFA	Nicola Rizzoli (Italy)	Renato Faverani (Italy)	Andrea Stefani (Italy)	Svein Oddvar Moen (Norway) / Kim Haglund (Norway)
UEFA	Carlos Velasco Carballo (Spain)	Roberto Alonso Fernández (Spain)	Juan Carlos Yuste Jiménez (Spain)	Svein Oddvar Moen (Norway) / Kim Haglund (Norway)
UEFA	Howard Webb (England)	Michael Mullarkey (England)	Darren Cann (England)	Svein Oddvar Moen (Norway) / Kim Haglund (Norway)

1. Replaced assistant Referee Ravinesh Kumar, who missed the World Cup due to an injury.
2. Daniel Bennett missed the World Cup due to an injury.

== Matches ==
Name	Match
Yuichi Nishimura	12 June 2014 17:00: Brazil / 3–1 / Croatia; / Report; Arena de São Paulo, São Paulo Attendance: 62,103
Ravshan Irmatov	15 June 2014 13:00: Switzerland / 2–1 / Ecuador; / Report; Estádio Nacional Mané Garrincha, Brasília Attendance: 68,351 23 June 2014 17:00: Croatia / 1–3 / Mexico; / Report; Arena Pernambuco, Recife Attendance: 41,212 26 June 2014 13:00: United States / 0–1 / Germany; / Report; Arena Pernambuco, Recife Attendance: 41,876 5 July 2014 17:00: Netherlands / 0–0 (a.e.t.) (4–3 pen.) (a.e.t.) / Costa Rica; / Report; Arena Fonte Nova, Salvador Attendance: 51,179
Nawaf Shukralla	23 June 2014 13:00: Australia / 0–3 / Spain; / Report; Arena da Baixada, Curitiba Attendance: 39,375 26 June 2014 13:00: Portugal / 2–1 / Ghana; / Report; Estádio Nacional Mané Garrincha, Brasília Attendance: 67,540
Ben Williams	20 June 2014 19:00: Honduras / 1–2 / Ecuador; / Report; Arena da Baixada, Curitiba Attendance: 39,224 26 June 2014 17:00: South Korea / 0–1 / Belgium; / Report; Arena de São Paulo, São Paulo Attendance: 61,397 29 June 2014 17:00: Costa Rica / 1–1 (a.e.t.) (5–3 pen.) (a.e.t.) / Greece; / Report; Arena Pernambuco, Recife Attendance: 41,242
Noumandiez Doué	13 June 2014 19:00: Chile / 3–1 / Australia; / Report; Arena Pantanal, Cuiabá Attendance: 40,275 25 June 2014 17:00: Ecuador / 0–0 / France; / Report; Estádio do Maracanã, Rio de Janeiro Attendance: 73,749
Bakary Gassama	23 June 2014 13:00: Netherlands / 2–0 / Chile; / Report; Arena de São Paulo, São Paulo Attendance: 62,996
Djamel Haimoudi	18 June 2014 13:00: Australia / 2–3 / Netherlands; / Report; Estádio Beira-Rio, Porto Alegre Attendance: 42,877 24 June 2014 13:00: Costa Rica / 0–0 / England; / Report; Estádio Mineirão, Belo Horizonte Attendance: 57,823 1 July 2014 17:00: Belgium / 2–1 (a.e.t.) / United States; / Report; Arena Fonte Nova, Salvador Attendance: 51,227 12 July 2014 17:00: Brazil / 0–3 / Netherlands; / Report; Estádio Nacional Mané Garrincha, Brasília Attendance: 68,034
Joel Aguilar	15 June 2014 19:00: Argentina / 2–1 / Bosnia and Herzegovina; / Report; Estádio do Maracanã, Rio de Janeiro Attendance: 74,738 19 June 2014 19:00: Japan / 0–0 / Greece; / Report; Arena das Dunas, Natal Attendance: 39,485
Mark Geiger	14 June 2014 13:00: Colombia / 3–0 / Greece; / Report; Estádio Mineirão, Belo Horizonte Attendance: 57,174 18 June 2014 16:00: Spain / 0–2 / Chile; / Report; Estádio do Maracanã, Rio de Janeiro Attendance: 74,101 30 June 2014 13:00: France / 2–0 / Nigeria; / Report; Estádio Nacional Mané Garrincha, Brasília Attendance: 67,882
Marco Rodríguez	17 June 2014 13:00: Belgium / 2–1 / Algeria; / Report; Estádio Mineirão, Belo Horizonte Attendance: 56,800 24 June 2014 13:00: Italy / 0–1 / Uruguay; / Report; Arena das Dunas, Natal Attendance: 39,706 8 July 2014 17:00: Brazil / 1–7 / Germany; / Report; Estádio Mineirão, Belo Horizonte Attendance: 58,141
Néstor Pitana	17 June 2014 19:00: Russia / 1–1 / South Korea; / Report; Arena Pantanal, Cuiabá Attendance: 37,603 22 June 2014 19:00: United States / 2–2 / Portugal; / Report; Arena da Amazônia, Manaus Attendance: 40,123 25 June 2014 17:00: Honduras / 0–3 / Switzerland; / Report; Arena da Amazônia, Manaus Attendance: 40,322 4 July 2014 13:00: France / 0–1 / Germany; / Report; Estádio do Maracanã, Rio de Janeiro Attendance: 74,240
Sandro Ricci	15 June 2014 16:00: France / 3–0 / Honduras; / Report; Estádio Beira-Rio, Porto Alegre Attendance: 43,012 21 June 2014 16:00: Germany / 2–2 / Ghana; / Report; Estádio Castelão, Fortaleza Attendance: 59,621 30 June 2014 17:00: Germany / 2–1 (a.e.t.) / Algeria; / Report; Estádio Beira-Rio, Porto Alegre Attendance: 43,063
Enrique Osses	14 June 2014 22:00: Ivory Coast / 2–1 / Japan; / Report; Arena Pernambuco, Recife Attendance: 40,267 20 June 2014 13:00: Italy / 0–1 / Costa Rica; / Report; Arena Pernambuco, Recife Attendance: 40,285
Wilmar Roldán	13 June 2014 13:00: Mexico / 1–0 / Cameroon; / Report; Arena das Dunas, Natal Attendance: 39,216 22 June 2014 16:00: South Korea / 2–4 / Algeria; / Report; Estádio Beira-Rio, Porto Alegre Attendance: 42,732
Carlos Vera	16 June 2014 16:00: Iran / 0–0 / Nigeria; / Report; Arena da Baixada, Curitiba Attendance: 39,081 24 June 2014 17:00: Greece / 2–1 / Ivory Coast; / Report; Estádio Castelão, Fortaleza Attendance: 59,095
Peter O'Leary	21 June 2014 19:00: Nigeria / 1–0 / Bosnia and Herzegovina; / Report; Arena Pantanal, Cuiabá Attendance: 40,499
Felix Brych	14 June 2014 16:00: Uruguay / 1–3 / Costa Rica; / Report; Estádio Castelão, Fortaleza Attendance: 58,679 22 June 2014 13:00: Belgium / 1–0 / Russia; / Report; Estádio do Maracanã, Rio de Janeiro Attendance: 73,819
Cüneyt Çakır	17 June 2014 16:00: Brazil / 0–0 / Mexico; / Report; Estádio Castelão, Fortaleza Attendance: 60,342 26 June 2014 17:00: Algeria / 1–1 / Russia; / Report; Arena da Baixada, Curitiba Attendance: 39,311 9 July 2014 17:00: Netherlands / 0–0 (a.e.t.) (2–4 pen.) (a.e.t.) / Argentina; / Report; Arena de São Paulo, São Paulo Attendance: 63,267
Jonas Eriksson	16 June 2014 19:00: Ghana / 1–2 / United States; / Report; Arena das Dunas, Natal Attendance: 39,760 23 June 2014 17:00: Cameroon / 1–4 / Brazil; / Report; Estádio Nacional Mané Garrincha, Brasília Attendance: 69,112 1 July 2014 13:00: Argentina / 1–0 (a.e.t.) / Switzerland; / Report; Arena de São Paulo, São Paulo Attendance: 63,255
Björn Kuipers	14 June 2014 19:00: England / 1–2 / Italy; / Report; Arena da Amazônia, Manaus Attendance: 39,800 20 June 2014 16:00: Switzerland / 2–5 / France; / Report; Arena Fonte Nova, Salvador Attendance: 51,003 28 June 2014 17:00: Colombia / 2–0 / Uruguay; / Report; Estádio do Maracanã, Rio de Janeiro Attendance: 73,804
Milorad Mažić	16 June 2014 13:00: Germany / 4–0 / Portugal; / Report; Arena Fonte Nova, Salvador Attendance: 51,081 21 June 2014 13:00: Argentina / 1–0 / Iran; / Report; Estádio Mineirão, Belo Horizonte Attendance: 57,698
Pedro Proença	18 June 2014 18:00: Cameroon / 0–4 / Croatia; / Report; Arena da Amazônia, Manaus Attendance: 39,982 24 June 2014 16:00: Japan / 1–4 / Colombia; / Report; Arena Pantanal, Cuiabá Attendance: 40,340 29 June 2014 13:00: Netherlands / 2–1 / Mexico; / Report; Estádio Castelão, Fortaleza Attendance: 58,817
Nicola Rizzoli	13 June 2014 16:00: Spain / 1–5 / Netherlands; / Report; Arena Fonte Nova, Salvador Attendance: 48,173 25 June 2014 13:00: Nigeria / 2–3 / Argentina; / Report; Estádio Beira-Rio, Porto Alegre Attendance: 43,285 5 July 2014 13:00: Argentina / 1–0 / Belgium; / Report; Estádio Nacional Mané Garrincha, Brasília Attendance: 68,551 13 July 2014 16:00: Germany / 1–0 (a.e.t.) / Argentina; / Report; Estádio do Maracanã, Rio de Janeiro Attendance: 74,738
Carlos Velasco Carballo	19 June 2014 16:00: Uruguay / 2–1 / England; / Report; Arena de São Paulo, São Paulo Attendance: 62,575 25 June 2014 13:00: Bosnia and Herzegovina / 3–1 / Iran; / Report; Arena Fonte Nova, Salvador Attendance: 48,011 4 July 2014 17:00: Brazil / 2–1 / Colombia; / Report; Estádio Castelão, Fortaleza Attendance: 60,342
Howard Webb	19 June 2014 13:00: Colombia / 2–1 / Ivory Coast; / Report; Estádio Nacional Mané Garrincha, Brasília Attendance: 68,748 28 June 2014 13:00: Brazil / 1–1 (a.e.t.) (3–2 pen.) (a.e.t.) / Chile; / Report; Estádio Mineirão, Belo Horizonte Attendance: 57,714
