= Mickaël Poté =

Beninese footballer (born 1984)

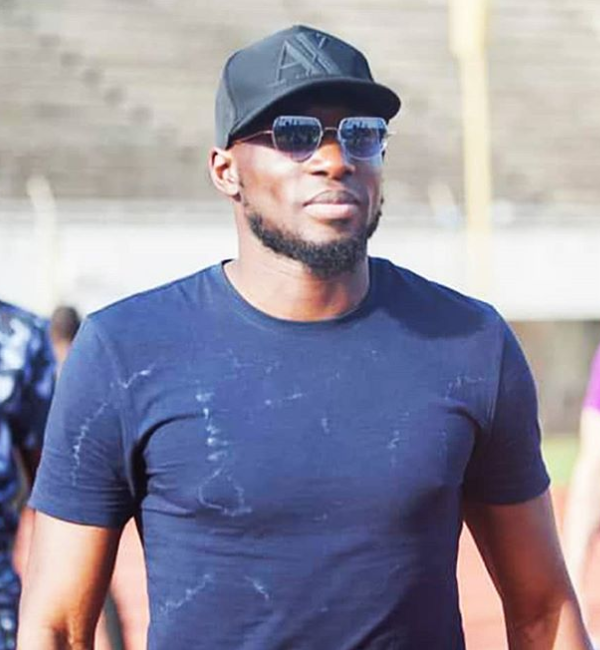
- Poté in 2019

Personal information
- Full name: Mickaël Franck Poté
- Date of birth: 24 September 1984 (age 42)
- Place of birth: Lyon, France
- Height: 1.79 m (5 ft 10 in)
- Position: Forward

Youth career
- 2002–2003: Grenoble

Senior career*
Years	Team	Apps	(Gls)
2003–2004	Grenoble	3	(0)
2004–2007	Cannes	52	(9)
2007–2009	Clermont	68	(12)
2009–2011	Nice	21	(2)
2011	Le Mans	19	(3)
2011–2014	Dynamo Dresden	83	(21)
2014–2015	Omonia	29	(17)
2015–2017	Adana Demirspor	68	(47)
2017–2018	APOEL	29	(11)
2018–2019	Adana Demirspor	35	(16)
2019–2020	BB Erzurumspor	27	(7)
2020–2021	Bandırmaspor	30	(8)
2021	Menemenspor	9	(0)
2022–2023	Mağusa Türk Gücü	43	(34)
2023–2024	Karsıyaka Anamur	12	(6)

International career
2008–2022	Benin	69	(10)
- * Club domestic league appearances and goals

Mickaël Franck Poté (born 24 September 1984) is a Beninese former professional footballer.

== Club career ==
Born in Lyon, Poté began his career in 2003 with Grenoble Foot, where he played only three games in his first season. After the season, he signed a contract with Cannes, where he stayed three years, playing fifty-one games and scoring nine goals. In the summer of 2007, he joined Clermont Foot, where he played thirty-six games in his first season, scoring five goals. In the spring of 2009, there were rumours that he might be transferred to Strasbourg or Havre, but neither transfer occurred. On 26 June 2009, he signed a three-year contract with Ligue 1 side Nice. On 2 January 2011, he joined Ligue 2 side Le Mans on a six-month loan deal. In August 2011, he left France and signed a three-year contract with 2. Bundesliga club Dynamo Dresden. In 2014, Poté moved to Omonia, where he was Cypriot's League top scorer with 17 goals in a season. In the 2015–16 season, he played for Adana Demirspor at Turkish 1st Division and won the top scorer title with his 20 goals.

== International career ==
Although Poté was born in France, he was eligible to represent the Ivory Coast, due to his father's roots. Instead, he chose to play for Benin, his mother's country. His debut game was on 7 September 2008, against Angola.

He played at 2019 Africa Cup of Nations where the team reached the quarter-finals.

== Career statistics ==
Appearances and goals by national team and year
National team	Year	Apps	Goals
Benin	2008	4	0
Benin	2009	6	0
Benin	2010	5	1
Benin	2011	3	0
Benin	2012	5	2
Benin	2013	1	1
Benin	2014	4	0
Benin	2015	5	0
Benin	2016	3	1
Benin	2017	6	2
Benin	2018	4	0
Benin	2019	12	3
Benin	2020	2	0
Benin	2021	8	0
Benin	2022	1	0
Total		69	10

Scores and results list Benin's goal tally first, score column indicates score after each Poté goal.

List of international goals scored by Mickaël Poté
No.	Date	Venue	Opponent	Score	Result	Competition
1	5 September 2010	Stade de l'Amitié, Cotonou, Benin	Burundi	1–0	1–1	2012 Africa Cup of Nations qualification
2	26 May 2012	Stade du 4-Août, Ouagadougou, Burkina Faso	Burkina Faso	2–1	2–2	Friendly
3	17 June 2012	Stade de l'Amitié, Cotonou, Benin	Ethiopia	1–0	1–1	2013 Africa Cup of Nations qualification
4	8 September 2013	Stade Charles de Gaulle, Porto-Novo, Benin	Rwanda	1–0	2–0	2014 FIFA World Cup qualification
5	27 March 2016	Stade de l'Amitié, Cotonou, Benin	South Sudan	2–0	4–1	2017 Africa Cup of Nations qualification
6	3 September 2017	Estadio de Malabo, Malabo, Equatorial Guinea	Equatorial Guinea	1–0	2–1	Friendly
7	10 October 2017	Stade d'Honneur Marcel Roustan, Salon-de-Provence, France	Gabon	1–0	1–0	Friendly
8	25 June 2019	Ismailia Stadium, Ismailia, Egypt	Ghana	1–0	2–2	2019 Africa Cup of Nations
9	25 June 2019	Ismailia Stadium, Ismailia, Egypt	Ghana	2–2	2–2	2019 Africa Cup of Nations
10	13 October 2019	Stade Charles de Gaulle, Porto-Novo, Benin	Zambia	2–2	2–2	Friendly
