= Daniel Bennett (referee) =

English-born South African football referee

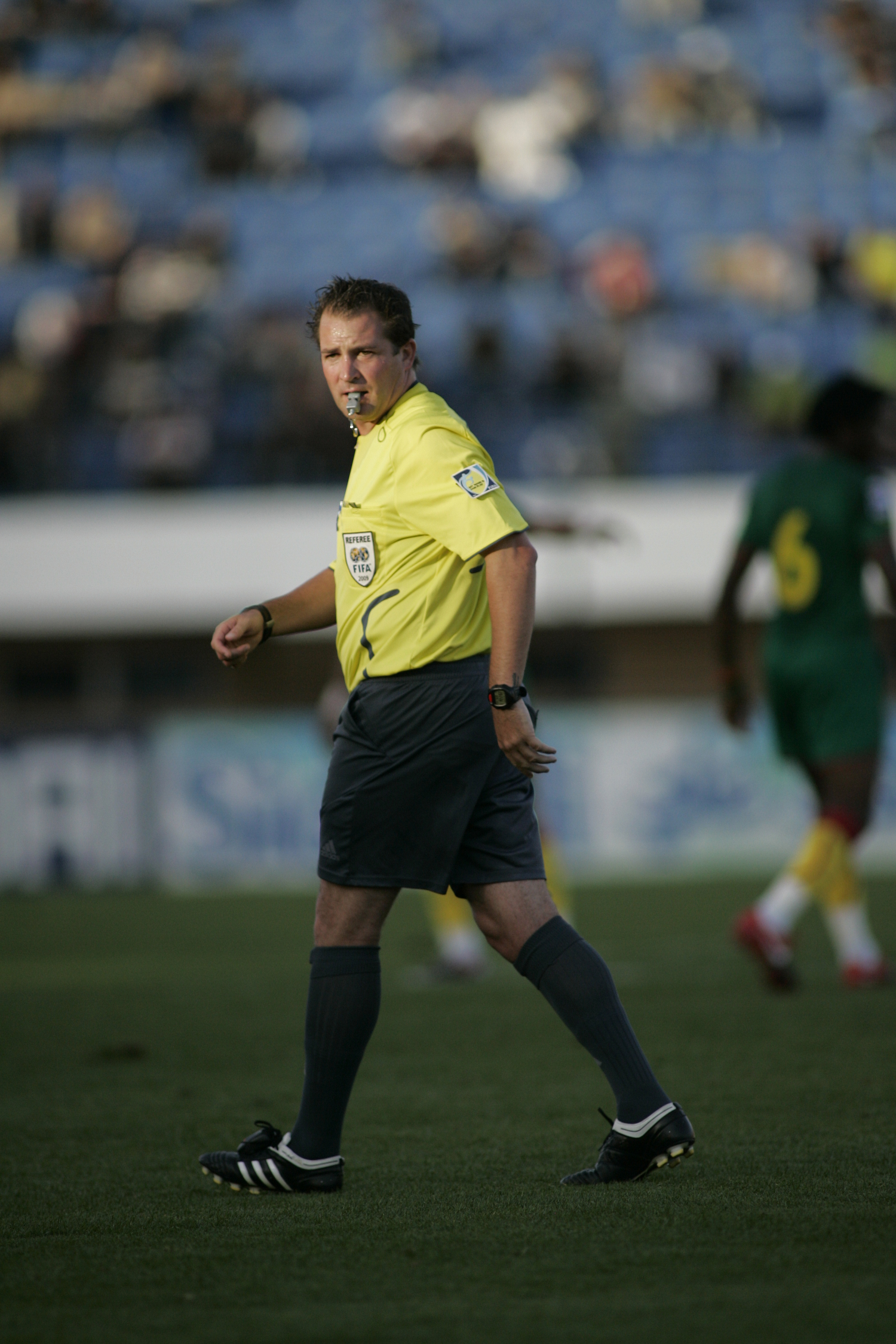
- Full name: Daniel Frazer Bennett
- Born: 22 August 1976 (age 50)

Domestic
| Years | League | Role |

International
| Years | League | Role |
| 2003–2019 | FIFA listed | Referee |

Daniel Frazer Bennett (born 22 August 1976 in Dewsbury, England) is a South African football referee. He was voted PSL Referee of the Season in 2000–01 and 2010–11 and has been an international referee since 2003.

== Career ==
=== International ===
Bennett missed the 2014 FIFA World Cup due to injury.

In June 2019, Bennett announced he would retire from international refereeing at the end of 2019.
