= Pacifique Ndabihawenimana =

Burundian football referee

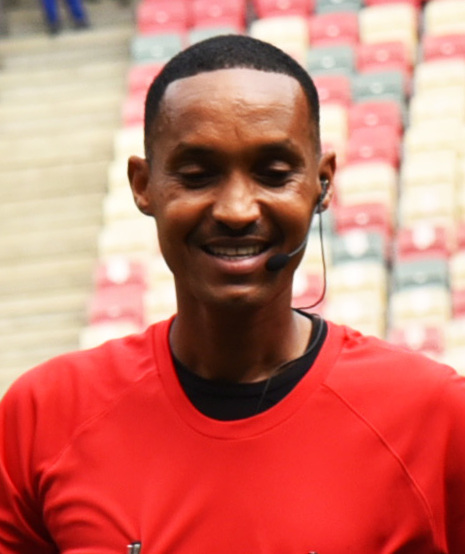
- Ndabihawenimana in 2022
- Born: 5 March 1985 (age 41); Burundi

International
Years	League	Role
2013–	FIFA listed	Referee; VAR official

Pacifique Ndabihawenimana (born 5 March 1985) is a Burundian football referee.

== Career ==
Born in Burundi, Ndabihawenimana has been a FIFA referee since 2013 and has officiated international football matches since then.

He refereed two matches at the 2019 U-20 Africa Cup of Nations: a group-stage game between Mali and Ghana, and a semi-final between Senegal and South Africa. That same year, Ndabihawenimana served as a support referee at the FIFA U-20 World Cup in Poland. He is active in the CAF qualification phases for the 2026 FIFA World Cup, and also officiated in qualification matches for the previous World Cup.

In CAF tournaments, Ndabihawenimana has overseen games in three Africa Cup of Nations. In the 2019 edition in Egypt, he led the goalless draw between Benin and Guinea-Bissau, which was his only match in the tournament. At the 2021 Cup in Cameroon, Ndabihawenimana officiated the game between Guinea-Bissau and Egypt for Group D, the round of 16 victory of Morocco over Malawi, and the quarter-finals match between the Gambia and the hosts Cameroon. His third AFCON appointment came for the 2023 edition in the Ivory Coast, leading a single match between Guinea and Senegal in Group C.

Other CAF competition for Ndabihawenimana was the 2020 African Nations Championship in Cameroon and the final match between South Africa team Kaizer Chiefs and Egypt's Al Ahly at the 2021 CAF Champions League in Morocco.

== Selected performances ==
Date	Match	Result	Round	Tournament
9 February 2019	Mali – Ghana	1–0	Group stage	2019 U-20 Africa Cup of Nations
13 February 2019	Senegal – South Africa	1–0	Semifinal	2019 U-20 Africa Cup of Nations
29 June 2019	Benin – Guinea-Bissau	0–0	Group stage	2019 Africa Cup of Nations
15 January 2022	Guinea-Bissau – Egypt	0–1	Group stage	2021 Africa Cup of Nations
25 January 2022	Morocco – Malawi	2–1	Round of 16	2021 Africa Cup of Nations
29 January 2022	Gambia – Cameroon	0–2	Quarterfinal	2021 Africa Cup of Nations
23 January 2024	Guinea – Senegal	0–2	Group stage	2023 Africa Cup of Nations
