= 2019 Africa Cup of Nations qualification Group D =

Group D of the 2019 Africa Cup of Nations qualification tournament was one of the twelve groups to decide the teams which qualified for the 2019 Africa Cup of Nations finals tournament. The group consisted of four teams: Algeria, Togo, Benin, and Gambia.

The teams played against each other in home-and-away round-robin format between June 2017 and March 2019.

Algeria and Benin, the group winners and runners-up respectively, qualified for the 2019 Africa Cup of Nations.

== Standings ==
Pos	Team	Pld	W	D	L	GF	GA	GD	Pts	Qualification	Algeria national football team	Benin national football team	Gambia national football team	Togo national football team
1	Algeria	6	3	2	1	9	4	+5	11	Final tournament	—	2–0	1–1	1–0
2	Benin	6	3	1	2	5	6	−1	10	Final tournament	1–0	—	1–0	2–1
3	Gambia	6	1	3	2	6	6	0	6		1–1	3–1	—	0–1
4	Togo	6	1	2	3	4	8	−4	5		1–4	0–0	1–1	—

Source: CAF
Rules for classification: Qualification tiebreakers

== Matches ==
11 June 2017
16:00 UTC+1

Benin	1–0	Gambia
Sessègnon 53'	Report

Stade de l'Amitié, Cotonou
Referee: Boubou Traoré (Mali)
11 June 2017
22:00 UTC+1

Algeria	1–0	Togo
Hanni 22'	Report

Stade Mustapha Tchaker, Blida
Referee: Joshua Bondo (Botswana)

8 September 2018
16:30 UTC+0

Gambia	1–1	Algeria
Ceesay 49'	Report	Bounedjah 47'

Independence Stadium, Bakau
Attendance: 40,000
Referee: Youssef Essrayri (Tunisia)
9 September 2018
16:00 UTC+0

Togo	0–0	Benin
	Report

Stade Municipal, Lomé
Referee: Noureddine El Jaafari (Morocco)

12 October 2018
16:00 UTC+0

Togo	1–1	Gambia
Denkey 84'	Report	Ceesay 7'

Stade Municipal, Lomé
Referee: Antoine Effa (Cameroon)
12 October 2018
20:45 UTC+1

Algeria	2–0	Benin
Bensebaini 20'; Bounedjah 73'	Report

Stade Mustapha Tchaker, Blida
Referee: Sékou Ahmed Touré (Guinea)

16 October 2018
16:05 UTC+1

Benin	1–0	Algeria
D'Almeida 16'	Report

Stade de l'Amitié, Cotonou
Referee: Jackson Pavaza (Namibia)
16 October 2018
16:30 UTC+0

Gambia	0–1	Togo
	Report	Ayité 90'

Independence Stadium, Bakau
Referee: Hélder Martins de Carvalho (Angola)

17 November 2018
16:30 UTC+0

Gambia	3–1	Benin
L. Jallow 70'; B. Jobe 78'; A. Jallow 90+4'	Report	Mounié 34'

Independence Stadium, Bakau
Referee: Sadok Selmi (Tunisia)
18 November 2018
16:00 UTC+0

Togo	1–4	Algeria
Fo-Doh Laba 55'	Report	Mahrez 13', 30'; Attal 28'; Bounedjah 90+2'

Stade Municipal, Lomé
Referee: Davies Omweno (Kenya)

22 March 2019
20:45 UTC+1

Algeria	1–1	Gambia
Abeid 42'	Report	Danso 90+2'

Stade Mustapha Tchaker, Blida
Referee: Sidi Alioum (Cameroon)
24 March 2019
16:00 UTC+1

Benin	2–1	Togo
Djigla 12'; Mounié 83'	Report	Adebayor 72'

Stade de l'Amitié, Cotonou
Referee: Bamlak Tessema Weyesa (Ethiopia)

== Goalscorers ==
There were 24 goals scored in 12 matches, for an average of 2 goals per match.

3 goals

- (Algeria) Baghdad Bounedjah

2 goals

- (Algeria) Riyad Mahrez
- (Benin) Steve Mounié
- (The Gambia) Assan Ceesay

1 goal

- (Algeria) Mehdi Abeid
- (Algeria) Youcef Attal
- (Algeria) Ramy Bensebaini
- (Algeria) Sofiane Hanni
- (Benin) Sessi D'Almeida
- (Benin) David Djigla
- (Benin) Stéphane Sessègnon
- (The Gambia) Mamadou Danso
- (The Gambia) Ablie Jallow
- (The Gambia) Lamin Jallow
- (The Gambia) Bubacarr Jobe
- (Togo) Emmanuel Adebayor
- (Togo) Floyd Ayité
- (Togo) Kévin Denkey
- (Togo) Kodjo Fo-Doh Laba
