= Séidou Barazé =

Beninese association football player

Personal information
- Full name: Séidou Barazé Guéro
- Date of birth: 20 October 1990 (age 36)
- Place of birth: Abomey, Benin
- Height: 1.82 m (6 ft 0 in)
- Position: Defender

Team information
- Current team: SC Schiltigheim

Youth career
- 2006–2008: Njala Quan Sports Academy
- 2008–2009: Kadji Sports Academy

Senior career*
Years	Team	Apps	(Gls)
2009–2012	Tonnerre d'Abomey		
2012–2013	Al-Nasr SC (Salalah)		
2013	Mogas 90 FC		
2013–2014	Hassania Agadir	16	(0)
2014–2015	Kawkab Marrakech	11	(0)
2015–2016	Al-Fahaheel		
2016	Al-Ittihad Tripoli		
2016–2017	Pharco		
2017	OPS	8	(0)
2017–2018	UMS Montélimar		
2018–2020	Moulins Yzeure Foot	27	(4)
2020–	SC Schiltigheim	10	(0)

International career^{‡}
2011–	Benin	22	(0)
- * Club domestic league appearances and goals as of 14:39, 17 November 2020 (UTC) ‡ National team caps and goals as of 21:46, 15 August 2020 (UTC)

Séidou Barazé Guéro (born 20 October 1990) is a Beninese professional footballer who plays for SC Schiltigheim and the Benin national football team.

== Career statistics ==
=== International ===
As of matches played on 15 August 2020

Benin national team
Year	Apps	Goals
2011	3	0
2012	1	0
2013	1	0
2014	4	0
2015	3	0
2016	0	0
2017	0	0
2018	3	0
2019	7	0
Total	22	0
