= Jerome Damon =

Association football referee from South Africa

- Full name: Jerome Kelvyn Damon
- Born: 4 April 1972 (age 54); Cape Town, Western Cape, South Africa
| Years | | Role |
| 1996–2014 | | Referee |

International
| Years | League | Role |
| 2000–2014 | FIFA-listed | Referee |

Jerome Kelvyn Damon (born 4 April 1972) is a retired South African football referee.

He was voted PSL Referee of the Season in 2004–05 and 2008–09.

An international referee since 2000, Damon was on stand-by for the 2006 FIFA World Cup, and was a referee at the 2004, 2006, 2008 and 2010 Africa Cup of Nations.

He was preselected as a referee for the 2010 FIFA World Cup.
