= Tidjani Anaane =

Beninese footballer (born 1997)

Personal information
- Full name: Tidjani Anaane
- Date of birth: 29 March 1997 (age 29)
- Place of birth: Gangban, Benin
- Height: 1.72 m (5 ft 8 in)
- Position: Midfielder

Senior career*
Years	Team	Apps	(Gls)
–2015	ASPAC		
2018–2020	ES Tunis	0	(0)
2017–2018	→ US Monastir (loan)	24	(2)
2018–2019	→ Ben Guerdane (loan)	12	(1)
2019–2020	→ Soliman (loan)	16	(4)
2020–2021	Menemenspor	24	(4)
2021–2023	Doxa Katokopias	64	(7)
2023	Košice	9	(1)
2024	Al-Rayyan		

International career^{‡}
2019–	Benin	11	(0)
- * Club domestic league appearances and goals as of 11:41, 7 January 2024 (UTC) ‡ National team caps and goals as of 11:41, 7 January 2024 (UTC)

Tidjani Anaane (born 29 March 1997) is a Beninese professional footballer who plays as a midfielder for the Benin national team.

== International career ==
Anaane made his debut for the Benin national football team in a 2019 Africa Cup of Nations qualification 2–1 win over Togo on 27 March 2019.
