= David Djigla =

Beninese footballer (born 1995)

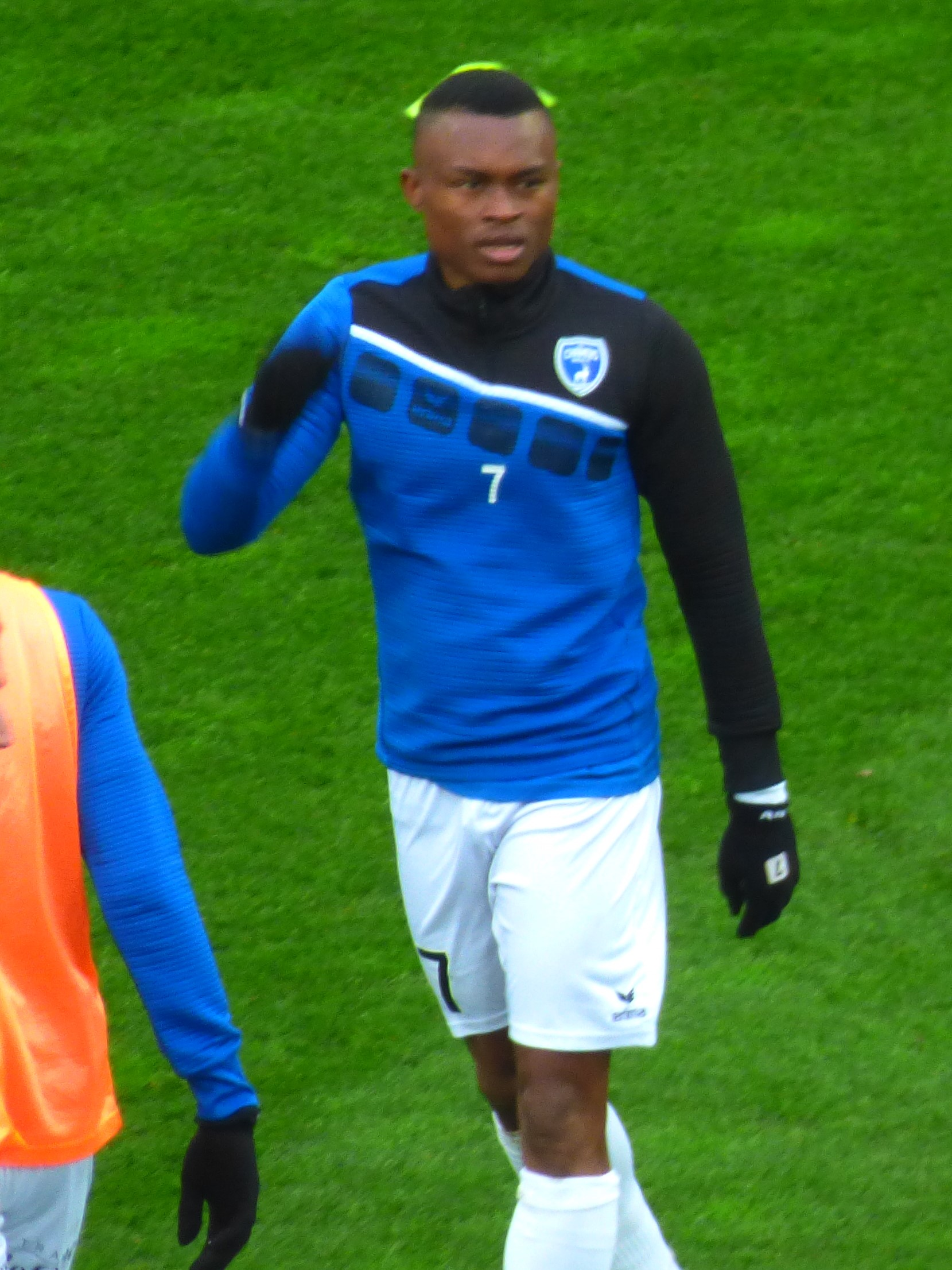
- Djigla with Niort in 2019

Personal information
- Full name: David Djigla
- Date of birth: 23 August 1995 (age 31)
- Place of birth: Akpakpa, Cotonou, Benin
- Height: 1.75 m (5 ft 9 in)
- Position: Striker

Team information
- Current team: Chauray
- Number: 23

Youth career
- –2013: AS Onze Créateurs de Cotonou
- 2013–2014: Bordeaux

Senior career*
Years	Team	Apps	(Gls)
2013–2015	Bordeaux B	28	(3)
2015	Bordeaux	1	(0)
2015–2021	Chamois Niortais	128	(8)
2016–2018	Chamois Niortais B	7	(0)
2022–2025	Les Herbiers	2	(0)
2026–	Chauray	0	(0)

International career
2012–2020	Benin	28	(4)
- * Club domestic league appearances and goals

David Djigla (born 23 August 1995) is a Beninese professional footballer who plays as a striker for Championnat National 1 club Chauray. Between 2012 and 2020, he scored four goals in 28 appearances for the Benin national team.

== Early life ==
Djigla was born and raised in the Akpakpa district of Cotonou, Benin. He began playing street football from the age of six and joined local club AS Onze Créateurs de Cotonou, where he developed until relocating to Europe in 2013.

== Club career ==
In September 2022, Djigla suffered a ruptured Achilles tendon, which significantly impacted his ability to return to his previous level of performance. He left Les Herbiers having only made two appearances for the club, and signed for Chauray in January 2026 having not played in a competitive match since his 2022 injury.

== International career ==
Djigla played at the 2019 Africa Cup of Nations when the team reached the quarter-finals.

== Career statistics ==
=== Club ===
As of 10 May 2026

Appearances and goals by club, season and competition
Club	Season	League			National cup		Other		Total	
Club	Season	Division	Apps	Goals	Apps	Goals	Apps	Goals	Apps	Goals
Bordeaux B	2013–14	CFA	11	2	—		—		11	2
Bordeaux B	2014–15	CFA	17	1	—		—		17	1
Bordeaux B	Total		28	3	—		—		28	3
Bordeaux	2014–15	Ligue 1	1	0	0	0	0	0	1	0
Chamois Niortais	2015–16	Ligue 2	31	1	2	0	1 (Note: Appearance(s) in Coupe de la Ligue)	0	34	1
Chamois Niortais	2016–17	Ligue 2	23	2	5	2	0	0	28	4
Chamois Niortais	2017–18	Ligue 2	22	4	2	0	1	0	25	4
Chamois Niortais	2018–19	Ligue 2	31	1	2	0	0	0	33	1
Chamois Niortais	2019–20	Ligue 2	10	0	2	0	0	0	12	0
Chamois Niortais	2020–21	Ligue 2	11	0	1	0	0	0	12	0
Chamois Niortais	Total		128	8	14	2	2	0	144	10
Chamois Niortais B	2015–16	CFA 2	1	0	—		—		1	0
Chamois Niortais B	2017–18	National 3	4	0	—		—		4	0
Chamois Niortais B	2018–19	National 3	2	0	—		—		2	0
Chamois Niortais B	Total		7	0	—		—		7	0
Les Herbiers	2022–23	National 2	2	0	0	0	—		2	0
Les Herbiers	2023–24	National 2	0	0	0	0	—		0	0
Les Herbiers	2024–25	National 2	0	0	0	0	—		0	0
Les Herbiers	Total		2	0	0	0	—		0	0
Chauray	2025–26	National 2	0	0	0	0	—		0	0
Career total			166	11	14	2	2	0	182	13

=== International ===
Appearances and goals by national team and year
National team	Year	Apps	Goals
Benin	2012	4	1
Benin	2013	0	0
Benin	2014	2	0
Benin	2015	3	0
Benin	2016	3	1
Benin	2017	3	1
Benin	2018	3	0
Benin	2019	7	1
Benin	2020	3	0
Total		28	4

As of match played 24 March 2019. Benin score listed first, score column indicates score after each Djigla goal.

International goals by date, venue, cap, opponent, score, result and competition
No.	Date	Venue	Cap	Opponent	Score	Result	Competition
1	26 May 2012	Stade du 4 Août, Ouagadougou, Burkina Faso	1	Burkina Faso	1–1	2–2	Friendly
2	12 June 2016	Stade de l'Amitié, Cotonou, Benin	10	Equatorial Guinea	2–1	2–1	2017 Africa Cup of Nations qualification
3	8 November 2017	Stade Municipal de Kintélé, Brazzaville, Congo	14	Congo	1–1	1–1	Friendly
4	24 March 2019	Stade de l'Amitié, Cotonou, Benin	19	Togo	1–0	2–1	2019 Africa Cup of Nations qualification
