= Séïbou Mama =

Beninese footballer

Personal information
- Full name: Séïbou Mama
- Date of birth: 28 December 1995 (age 30)
- Place of birth: Parakou, Benin
- Height: 1.72 m (5 ft 8 in)
- Position: Midfielder

Team information
- Current team: Saint-Nazaire AF

Senior career*
Years	Team	Apps	(Gls)
2012–2013	USS Kraké		
2013–2014	ASPAC		
2014–2015	Buffles du Borgou		
2016–2018	ASPAC		
2018–2021	Toulon	36	(1)
2021–	Vannes	33	(0)
2023–	Saint-Nazaire AF	7	(0)

International career^{‡}
- Benin U20
2014–2020	Benin	32	(2)
- * Club domestic league appearances and goals as of 1 July 2024 ‡ National team caps and goals as of 10:57, 24 May 2020 (UTC)

Séïbou Mama (born 28 December 1995) is a Beninese professional footballer who plays as a midfielder for French club Saint-Nazaire AF and the Benin national team.

== International career ==
At the youth level he played in the 2013 African U-20 Championship. He represented the senior national team at the 2019 Africa Cup of Nations, where the team reached the quarter-finals.

== Career statistics ==
Appearances and goals by national team and year
National team	Year	Apps	Goals
Benin	2014	6	0
Benin	2015	3	0
Benin	2016	0	0
Benin	2017	11	2
Benin	2018	0	0
Benin	2019	10	0
Benin	2020	2	0
Total		32	2

Scores and results list Benin's goal tally first, score column indicates score after each Mama goal.

List of international goals scored by Séïbou Mama
No.	Date	Venue	Opponent	Score	Result	Competition
1	21 May 2017	Stade de l'Amitié, Cotonou, Benin	Burkina Faso	2–2	2–2	Friendly
2	13 August 2017	Stade de l'Amitié, Cotonou, Benin	Nigeria	1–0	1–0	2018 African Nations Championship qualification
