= Moïse Adiléhou =

Footballer (born 1995)

Personal information
- Full name: Moïse Wilfrid Maoussé Adiléhou
- Date of birth: 1 November 1995 (age 31)
- Place of birth: Colombes, France
- Height: 1.90 m (6 ft 3 in)
- Position: Centre-back

Youth career
- 2011–2012: ES Nanterre
- 2012–2013: Valenciennes
- 2013: Porto

Senior career*
Years	Team	Apps	(Gls)
2013–2014	Valenciennes II	4	(0)
2014–2015	Pau	14	(0)
2015–2016	Vitré	9	(0)
2016	Slovan Bratislava	1	(0)
2016–2017	Kerkyra	4	(0)
2017–2019	Levadiakos	39	(1)
2020	Boluspor	5	(0)
2020–2022	NAC Breda	43	(2)
2022–2023	Zira	23	(1)
2023–2024	Maccabi Petah Tikva	22	(0)
2024–2026	Laval	13	(0)

International career^{‡}
2017–	Benin	14	(1)
- * Club domestic league appearances and goals as of 19 May 2026 ‡ National team caps and goals as of 4 May 2023

Moïse Wilfrid Maoussé Adiléhou (born 1 November 1995) is a professional footballer who plays as a centre-back. Born in France, he represents the Benin national team.

== Club career ==
Adiléhou made his professional debut for Slovan Bratislava against Spartak Myjava on 27 February 2016.

On 1 September 2020, Adiléhou joined Eerste Divisie club NAC Breda. His contract was not extended after the 2021–22 season, effectively making him a free agent.

Adiléhou signed a one-year contract with an option for an additional year with Azerbaijan Premier League club Zira on 4 August 2022.

On 20 June 2023, Adiléhou signed for the Israeli Premier League club Maccabi Petah Tikva. On 30 May 2024, he won his first title with the club, Israel State Cup, after beating Hapoel Be'er Sheva 1–0 in the final.

On 25 June 2024, Adiléhou signed a three-year contract with Laval.

== International career ==
Adiléhou was born in France and is Beninese by descent. He debuted for the Benin national team in a friendly 1–0 loss with Mauritania on 25 March 2017.

== Career statistics ==
=== Club ===
As of 20 August 2024

Appearances and goals by club, season and competition
Club	Season	League			National cup		Other		Total	
Club	Season	Division	Apps	Goals	Apps	Goals	Apps	Goals	Apps	Goals
Valenciennes B	2012–13	CFA	4	0	—		—		4	0
Pau	2014–15	CFA	14	1	—		—		14	1
Vitré	2015–16	CFA	9	0	—		—		9	0
Slovan Bratislava B	2015–16	Slovak 2. Liga	8	1	—		—		8	1
Slovan Bratislava	2015–16	Slovak 1. liga	1	0	0	0	—		1	0
Kerkyra	2016–17	Super League Greece	4	0	3	0	—		7	0
Levadiakos	2017–18	Super League Greece	17	0	5	0	—		22	0
Levadiakos	2018–19	Super League Greece	22	1	1	0	—		23	1
Levadiakos	Total		39	1	6	0	—		45	1
Boluspor	2019–20	TFF First League	5	0	—		—		5	0
NAC Breda	2020–21	Eerste Divisie	16	1	1	0	3 (Note: Appearance(s) in promotion/relegation play-off)	1	20	2
NAC Breda	2021–22	Eerste Divisie	27	1	3	0	2	0	32	1
NAC Breda	Total		43	2	4	0	5	1	52	3
Zira	2022–23	Azerbaijan Premier League	25	1	3	0	—		28	1
Maccabi Petah Tikva	2023–24	Israeli Premier League	22	0	4	0	5 (Note: Appearance(s) in Toto Cup)	0	31	0
Laval	2024–25	Ligue 2	1	0	—		—		1	0
Career total			175	6	20	0	10	1	205	7

=== International ===
As of matches played on 11 July 2019

Appearances and goals by national team and year
National team	Year	Apps	Goals
Benin	2017	1	0
Benin	2018	1	0
Benin	2019	6	0
Total		8	1

Scores and results list Benin's goal tally first, score column indicates score after each Adiléhou goal.

List of international goals scored by Moïse Adiléhou
No.	Date	Venue	Opponent	Score	Result	Competition
1	5 July 2019	Al Salam Stadium, Cairo, Egypt	Morocco	1–0	1–1 (4–1 p)	2019 Africa Cup of Nations

== Honours ==
Maccabi Petah Tikva

- Israel State Cup: 2023–24
