= Ismailia Stadium =

Football stadium in Ismailia, Egypt

Coordinates: 30°36′4″N 32°16′25″E

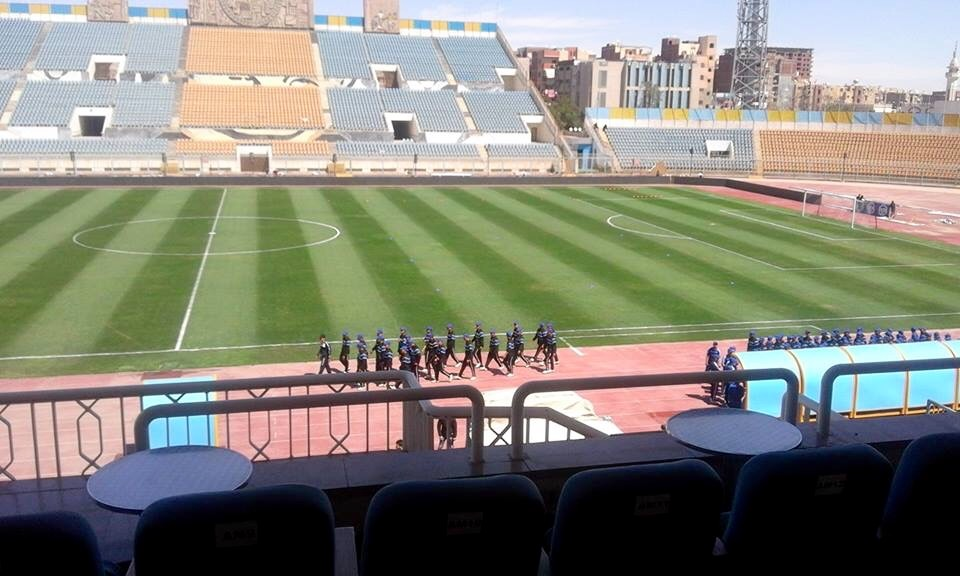
- Interactive map of Ismailia Stadium
- Location: Ismailia, Egypt
- Owner: Ismaily SC
- Capacity: 30,000 (all seated)
- Surface: Grass

Construction
- Renovated: 2009

The Ismailia Stadium (Arabic: ملعب الاسماعيلية) is located in Ismailia, Egypt, and has a total capacity of 18,525 after the remodelation in 2009, then it was upgraded to 30,000 seats after the remodelation in 2019 for the 2019 Africa Cup of Nations, It is used by Ismaily SC, and was one of six stadiums used in the 2006 African Cup of Nations and 2019 Africa Cup of Nations, held in Egypt.

== 2019 Africa Cup of Nations ==
The stadium is one of the venues for the 2019 Africa Cup of Nations.

The following games were played at the stadium during the 2019 Africa Cup of Nations:

Date	Time (CEST)	Team #1	Result	Team #2	Round	Attendance
25 June 2019	19:00	Cameroon	2–0	Guinea-Bissau	Group F	5,983
25 June 2019	22:00	Ghana	2–2	Benin	Group F	8,094
29 June 2019	19:00	Cameroon	0–0	Ghana	Group F	16,724
29 June 2019	22:00	Benin	0–0	Guinea-Bissau	Group F	9,212
2 July 2019	18:00	Benin	0–0	Cameroon	Group F	14,120
2 July 2019	21:00	Angola	0–1	Mali	Group E	8,135
8 July 2019	21:00	Ghana	2–2 (4–5 pen.)	Tunisia	Round of 16	8,890
