= 2019 Africa Cup of Nations Group D =

Football tournament group stage

Group D of the 2019 Africa Cup of Nations took place from 23 June to 1 July 2019. The group consisted of Ivory Coast, Morocco, Namibia and South Africa.

Morocco and Ivory Coast as the top two teams, along with South Africa as one of the four best third-placed teams, advanced to the round of 16.

== Teams ==
Draw position	Team	Zone	Method of qualification	Date of qualification	Finals appearance	Last appearance	Previous best performance	FIFA Rankings	
Draw position	Team	Zone	Method of qualification	Date of qualification	Finals appearance	Last appearance	Previous best performance	April 2019 (Note: The rankings of April 2019 were used for seeding for the final draw.)	June 2019
D1	Morocco	UNAF	Group B winners	17 November 2018	17th	2017	Winners (1976)	45	47
D2	Ivory Coast	WAFU	Group H runners-up	18 November 2018	23rd	2017	Winners (1992, 2015)	65	62
D3	South Africa	COSAFA	Group E runners-up	24 March 2019	10th	2015	Winners (1996)	73	72
D4	Namibia	COSAFA	Group K runners-up	23 March 2019	3rd	2008	Group stage (1998, 2008)	113	113

== Standings ==
Pos	Team	Pld	W	D	L	GF	GA	GD	Pts	Qualification
1	Morocco	3	3	0	0	3	0	+3	9	Advance to knockout stage
2	Ivory Coast	3	2	0	1	5	2	+3	6	Advance to knockout stage
3	South Africa	3	1	0	2	1	2	−1	3	Advance to knockout stage
4	Namibia	3	0	0	3	1	6	−5	0	

Source: CAF
Rules for classification: Tiebreakers

In the round of 16:

- The winners of Group D, Morocco, advanced to play the third-placed team of Group F, Benin.
- The runners-up of Group D, Ivory Coast, advanced to play the winners of Group E, Mali.
- The third-placed team of Group D, South Africa, advanced to play the winners of Group A, Egypt.

== Matches ==
=== Morocco vs Namibia ===
23 June 2019
16:30

Morocco	1–0	Namibia
Keimuine 89' (o.g.)	Report

Al Salam Stadium, Cairo
Attendance: 6,857
Referee: Louis Hakizimana (Rwanda)

Morocco	Namibia

GK	1	Yassine Bounou
RB	17	Nabil Dirar
CB	5	Mehdi Benatia (c)
CB	6	Romain Saïss
LB	2	Achraf Hakimi
CM	15	Youssef Aït Bennasser	(substituted off) 70'
CM	18	Mehdi Bourabia	(substituted off) 58'
RW	7	Hakim Ziyech
AM	14	Mbark Boussoufa
LW	16	Nordin Amrabat
CF	19	Youssef En-Nesyri	(substituted off) 78'
Substitutions:
FW	9	Sofiane Boufal	(substituted on) 58'
MF	8	Karim El Ahmadi	(substituted on) 70'
FW	13	Khalid Boutaïb	(substituted on) 78'
Manager:
(France) Hervé Renard

GK	23	Lloyd Kazapua
RB	6	Larry Horaeb
CB	22	Ryan Nyambe
CB	2	Denzil Hoaseb
LB	4	Riaan Hanamub
RM	19	Petrus Shitembi
CM	12	Ronald Ketjijere (c)
CM	10	Manfred Starke		(substituted off) 64'
LM	7	Deon Hotto		(substituted off) 87'
CF	13	Peter Shalulile
CF	11	Absalom Iimbondi		(substituted off) 80'
Substitutions:
MF	15	Marcel Papama		(substituted on) 64'
FW	17	Itamunua Keimuine	(yellow card) 90+3'	(substituted on) 80'
MF	8	Willy Stephanus		(substituted on) 87'
Manager:
Ricardo Mannetti

Man of the Match:
Mbark Boussoufa (Morocco)

Assistant referees:
Gilbert Cheruiyot (Kenya)
Mark Ssonko (Uganda)
Fourth official:
Issa Sy (Senegal)

=== Ivory Coast vs South Africa ===
24 June 2019
16:30

Ivory Coast	1–0	South Africa
Kodjia 64'	Report

Al Salam Stadium, Cairo
Attendance: 4,961
Referee: Mustapha Ghorbal (Algeria)

Ivory Coast	South Africa

GK	16	Sylvain Gbohouo
RB	17	Serge Aurier (c)
CB	6	Ismaël Traoré
CB	5	Wilfried Kanon	(yellow card) 61'
LB	2	Wonlo Coulibaly		(substituted off) 87'
DM	20	Serey Dié
CM	10	Jean Michaël Seri	(yellow card) 41'	(substituted off) 69'
CM	8	Franck Kessié
RW	19	Nicolas Pépé
LW	15	Max Gradel	(yellow card) 58'	(substituted off) 87'
CF	14	Jonathan Kodjia
Substitutions:
FW	9	Wilfried Zaha		(substituted on) 69'
DF	3	Souleyman Doumbia		(substituted on) 87'
FW	11	Maxwel Cornet		(substituted on) 87'
Manager:
Ibrahim Kamara

GK	22	Ronwen Williams
RB	5	Thamsanqa Mkhize
CB	18	Sifiso Hlanti
CB	2	Buhle Mkhwanazi
LB	14	Thulani Hlatshwayo (c)
CM	12	Kamohelo Mokotjo
RW	15	Dean Furman
AM	19	Percy Tau
LW	7	Lebohang Maboe		(substituted off) 75'
CF	9	Lebo Mothiba	(yellow card) 23'	(substituted off) 82'
CF	11	Themba Zwane
Substitutions:
MF	17	Sibusiso Vilakazi		(substituted on) 75'
FW	21	Lars Veldwijk		(substituted on) 82'
Manager:
(England) Stuart Baxter

Man of the Match:
Serge Aurier (Ivory Coast)

Assistant referees:
Abdelhak Etchiali (Algeria)
Mokrane Gourari (Algeria)
Fourth official:
Beida Dahane (Mauritania)

=== Morocco vs Ivory Coast ===
28 June 2019
19:00

Morocco	1–0	Ivory Coast
En-Nesyri 23'	Report

Al Salam Stadium, Cairo
Attendance: 27,500
Referee: Sidi Alioum (Cameroon)

Morocco	Ivory Coast

GK	1	Yassine Bounou
RB	17	Nabil Dirar
CB	5	Medhi Benatia (c)
CB	6	Romain Saïss
LB	2	Achraf Hakimi
DM	8	Karim El Ahmadi	(yellow card) 69'
RM	7	Hakim Ziyech		(substituted off) 75'
CM	14	Mbark Boussoufa		(substituted off) 90+3'
CM	10	Younès Belhanda
LM	16	Nordin Amrabat		(substituted off) 82'
CF	19	Youssef En-Nesyri
Substitutions:
FW	9	Sofiane Boufal		(substituted on) 75'
DF	3	Noussair Mazraoui		(substituted on) 82'
DF	4	Manuel da Costa		(substituted on) 90+3'
Manager:
(France) Hervé Renard

GK	16	Sylvain Gbohouo
RB	17	Serge Aurier (c)		(substituted off) 69'
CB	6	Ismaël Traoré
CB	5	Wilfried Kanon
LB	2	Wonlo Coulibaly	(yellow card) 59'
DM	20	Serey Dié
CM	10	Jean Michaël Seri		(substituted off) 63'
CM	8	Franck Kessié
RW	19	Nicolas Pépé
LW	15	Max Gradel		(substituted off) 55'
CF	14	Jonathan Kodjia
Substitutions:
FW	11	Maxwel Cornet		(substituted on) 55'
FW	12	Wilfried Bony		(substituted on) 63'
DF	22	Mamadou Bagayoko		(substituted on) 69'
Manager:
Ibrahim Kamara

Man of the Match:
Nordin Amrabat (Morocco)

Assistant referees:
Evarist Menkouande (Cameroon)
Elvis Nguegoue (Cameroon)
Fourth official:
Jean Ndala (DR Congo)

=== South Africa vs Namibia ===
28 June 2019
22:00

South Africa	1–0	Namibia
Zungu 68'	Report

Al Salam Stadium, Cairo
Attendance: 16,090
Referee: Issa Sy (Senegal)

South Africa	Namibia

GK	1	Darren Keet
RB	5	Thamsanqa Mkhize		(substituted off) 67'
CB	14	Thulani Hlatshwayo (c)
CB	2	Buhle Mkhwanazi
LB	18	Sifiso Hlanti
RM	20	Hlompho Kekana
CM	8	Bongani Zungu		(substituted off) 84'
CM	17	Sibusiso Vilakazi		(substituted off) 85'
LM	11	Themba Zwane	(yellow card) 79'
CF	9	Lebo Mothiba
CF	19	Percy Tau
Substitutions:
DF	6	Ramahlwe Mphahlele		(substituted on) 67'
MF	12	Kamohelo Mokotjo		(substituted on) 84'
FW	21	Lars Veldwijk		(substituted on) 85'
Manager:
(England) Stuart Baxter

GK	23	Lloyd Kazapua
RB	6	Larry Horaeb	(yellow card) 71'
CB	22	Ryan Nyambe
CB	2	Denzil Hoaseb
LB	4	Riaan Hanamub
RM	19	Petrus Shitembi
CM	12	Ronald Ketjijere (c)
CM	10	Manfred Starke	(yellow card) 46'	(substituted off) 76'
LM	7	Hotto Kavendji	(yellow card) 87'
CF	9	Benson Shilongo		(substituted off) 46'
CF	13	Peter Shalulile
Substitutions:
FW	18	Isaskar Gurirab		(substituted on) 46'
MF	14	Joslin Kamatuka		(substituted on) 76'
Manager:
Ricardo Mannetti

Man of the Match:
Percy Tau (South Africa)

Assistant referees:
El Hadji Malick Samba (Senegal)
Sidibe Sidiki (Guinea
Fourth official:
Beida Dahane (Mauritania)

=== South Africa vs Morocco ===
1 July 2019
18:00

South Africa	0–1	Morocco
	Report	Boussoufa 90'

Al Salam Stadium, Cairo
Attendance: 12,098
Referee: Jean-Jacques Ndala (DR Congo)

South Africa	Morocco

GK	22	Ronwen Williams
RB	5	Thamsanqa Mkhize
CB	14	Thulani Hlatshwayo (c)
CB	2	Buhle Mkhwanazi
LB	18	Sifiso Hlanti
CM	10	Thulani Serero
CM	12	Kamohelo Mokotjo
CM	8	Bongani Zungu	(yellow card) 31'	(substituted off) 81'
RF	19	Percy Tau
CF	9	Lebo Mothiba		(substituted off) 73'
LF	11	Themba Zwane	(yellow card) 18'	(substituted off) 75'
Substitutions:
FW	21	Lars Veldwijk		(substituted on) 73'
MF	17	Sibusiso Vilakazi		(substituted on) 75'
MF	20	Hlompho Kekana		(substituted on) 81'
Manager:
(England) Stuart Baxter

GK	12	Munir Mohand Mohamedi
RB	3	Noussair Mazraoui	(substituted off) 75'
CB	4	Manuel da Costa
CB	6	Romain Saïss
LB	2	Achraf Hakimi
CM	8	Karim El Ahmadi	(substituted off) 54'
CM	14	Mbark Boussoufa (c)
RW	7	Hakim Ziyech	(substituted off) 89'
AM	10	Younès Belhanda
LW	16	Nordin Amrabat
CF	19	Youssef En-Nesyri
Substitutions:
MF	17	Youssef Aït Bennasser	(substituted on) 54'
DF	17	Nabil Dirar	(substituted on) 75'
MF	11	Fayçal Fajr	(substituted on) 89'
Manager:
(France) Hervé Renard

Man of the Match:
Mbark Boussoufa (Morocco)

Assistant referees:
Oliver Safari (DR Congo)
Soulaimane Almadine (Comoros)
Fourth official:
Janny Sikazwe (Zambia)

=== Namibia vs Ivory Coast ===
1 July 2019
18:00

Namibia	1–4	Ivory Coast
Kamatuka 71'	Report	Gradel 39'; Dié 58'; Zaha 84'; Cornet 89'

30 June Stadium, Cairo
Attendance: 7,530
Referee: Peter Waweru (Kenya)

Namibia	Ivory Coast

GK	23	Lloyd Kazapua
RB	6	Larry Horaeb (c)
CB	4	Riaan Hanamub		(substituted off) 87'
CB	2	Denzil Hoaseb
LB	22	Ryan Nyambe
RM	19	Petrus Shitembi
CM	7	Hotto Kavendji	(yellow card) 78'
CM	15	Marcel Papama		(substituted off) 62'
LM	12	Ronald Ketjijere
CF	13	Peter Shalulile		(substituted off) 83'
CF	14	Joslin Kamatuka		(substituted off) 73'
Substitutions:
MF	8	Willy Stephanus		(substituted on) 62'
FW	18	Isaskar Gurirab		(substituted on) 73'
FW	9	Benson Shilongo		(substituted on) 83'
Manager:
Ricardo Mannetti

GK	16	Sylvain Gbohouo
RB	22	Mamadou Bagayoko (c)
CB	6	Ismaël Traoré
CB	5	Wilfried Kanon
LB	2	Wonlo Coulibaly
DM	20	Serey Dié
DM	4	Jean-Philippe Gbamin	(substituted off) 80'
CM	8	Franck Kessié
RF	9	Wilfried Zaha
CF	12	Wilfried Bony	(substituted off) 85'
LF	15	Max Gradel	(substituted off) 68'
Substitutions:
FW	11	Maxwel Cornet	(substituted on) 68'
MF	18	Ibrahim Sangaré	(substituted on) 80'
FW	14	Jonathan Kodjia	(substituted on) 85'
Manager:
Ibrahim Kamara

Man of the Match:
Serey Dié (Ivory Coast)

Assistant referees:
Souru Phatsoane (Lesotho)
Gilbert Cheruiyot (Kenya)
Fourth official:
Joshua Bondo (Botswana)
