= 2019 Africa Cup of Nations knockout stage =

Football tournament knockout stage

The knockout stage of the 2019 Africa Cup of Nations was the second and final stage of the competition, following the group stage. It began on 5 July with the round of 16 and ended on 19 July 2019 with the final, held at the Cairo International Stadium in Cairo. A total of 16 teams (the top two teams from each group, along with the four best third-placed teams) advanced to the knockout stage to compete in a single-elimination style tournament.

All match times are local, CAT (UTC+2).

== Format ==
In the knockout stage, except for the third place play-off, if a match was level at the end of 90 minutes of normal playing time, extra time was played (two periods of 15 minutes each). If still tied after extra time, the match was decided by a penalty shoot-out to determine the winner. In the third place play-off, if the scores remain level after 90 minutes the match would go directly to a penalty shoot-out, without any extra time being played.

CAF set out the following schedule for the round of 16:

- Match 37: Winner Group B v 3rd Group A/C/D
- Match 38: Runner-up Group A v Runner-up Group C
- Match 39: Winner Group A v 3rd Group C/D/E
- Match 40: Winner Group C v 3rd Group A/B/F
- Match 41: Winner Group D v 3rd Group B/E/F
- Match 42: Runner-up Group B v Runner-up Group F
- Match 43: Winner Group E v Runner-up Group D
- Match 44: Winner Group F v Runner-up Group E

=== Combinations of matches in the round of 16 ===
The specific match-ups involving the third-placed teams depended on which four third-placed teams qualified for the round of 16:

Combination according to the four qualified teams

Third-placed teams qualify from groups						1A vs	1B vs	1C vs	1D vs
A	B	C	D			3C	3D	3A	3B
A	B	C		E		3C	3A	3B	3E
A	B	C			F	3C	3A	3B	3F
A	B		D	E		3D	3A	3B	3E
A	B		D		F	3D	3A	3B	3F
A	B			E	F	3E	3A	3B	3F
A		C	D	E		3C	3D	3A	3E
A		C	D		F	3C	3D	3A	3F
A		C		E	F	3C	3A	3F	3E
A			D	E	F	3D	3A	3F	3E
	B	C	D	E		3C	3D	3B	3E
	B	C	D		F	3C	3D	3B	3F
	B	C		E	F	3E	3C	3B	3F
	B		D	E	F	3E	3D	3B	3F
		C	D	E	F	3C	3D	3F	3E

== Qualified teams ==
The top two placed teams from each of the six groups, plus the four best-placed third teams, qualified for the knockout stage.

Group	Winners	Runners-up	Third-placed teams (Best four qualified)
A	Egypt	Uganda	DR Congo
B	Madagascar	Nigeria	Guinea
C	Algeria	Senegal	—N/a
D	Morocco	Ivory Coast	South Africa
E	Mali	Tunisia	—N/a
F	Ghana	Cameroon	Benin

== Bracket ==
Round of 16
5 July – Cairo (International)
Uganda	0
Senegal	1
5 July – Cairo (Al Salam)
Morocco	1 (1)
Benin (p)	1 (4)
7 July – Alexandria
Madagascar (p)	2 (4)
DR Congo	2 (2)
8 July – Ismailia
Ghana	1 (4)
Tunisia (p)	1 (5)
8 July – Suez
Mali	0
Ivory Coast	1
7 July – Cairo (30 June)
Algeria	3
Guinea	0
6 July – Alexandria
Nigeria	3
Cameroon	2
6 July – Cairo (International)
Egypt	0
South Africa	1

Quarter-finals
10 July – Cairo (30 June)
Senegal	1
Benin	0
11 July – Cairo (Al Salam)
Madagascar	0
Tunisia	3
11 July – Suez
Ivory Coast	1 (3)
Algeria (p)	1 (4)
10 July – Cairo (International)
Nigeria	2
South Africa	1

Semi-finals
14 July – Cairo (30 June)
Senegal (a.e.t.)	1
Tunisia	0
14 July – Cairo (International)
Algeria	2
Nigeria	1

Final
19 July – Cairo (International)
Senegal	0
Algeria	1
Third place play-off
17 July – Cairo (Al Salam)
Tunisia	0
Nigeria	1

== Round of 16 ==
=== Morocco vs Benin ===
5 July 2019
18:00

Morocco	1–1 (a.e.t.)	Benin
En-Nesyri 76'	Report	Adilehou 53'
Penalties
Idrissi (penalty scored); Boufal (penalty missed); En-Nesyri (penalty missed)	1–4	(penalty scored) Verdon; (penalty scored) Djigla; (penalty scored) Anaane; (penalty scored) Séïbou

Al Salam Stadium, Cairo
Attendance: 7,500
Referee: Hélder Martins de Carvalho (Angola)

Morocco	Benin

GK	1	Yassine Bounou
RB	2	Achraf Hakimi
CB	6	Romain Saïss
CB	4	Manuel da Costa
LB	17	Nabil Dirar		(substituted off) 74'
DM	8	Karim El Ahmadi	(yellow card) 100'	(substituted off) 107'
RM	16	Nordin Amrabat		(substituted off) 88'
CM	10	Younès Belhanda		(substituted off) 59'
CM	14	Mbark Boussoufa (c)
LM	7	Hakim Ziyech
CF	19	Youssef En-Nesyri
Substitutions:
FW	9	Sofiane Boufal		(substituted on) 59'
DF	3	Noussair Mazraoui		(substituted on) 74'
FW	20	Oussama Idrissi	(yellow card) 90+1'	(substituted on) 88'
MF	11	Fayçal Fajr		(substituted on) 107'
Manager:
(France) Hervé Renard

GK	16	Saturnin Allagbé
CB	3	Khaled Adénon	(yellow card) 41' (yellow-red card) 97'
CB	6	Olivier Verdon
CB	13	Moise Adilehou
RM	14	Cebio Soukou	(yellow card) 51'	(substituted off) 69'
CM	8	Jordan Adéoti
CM	18	Mama Séïbou	(yellow card) 105+1'
LM	11	Emmanuel Imorou
RF	20	Jodel Dossou		(substituted off) 87'
CF	10	Mickaël Poté		(substituted off) 108'
LF	17	Stéphane Sessègnon (c)
Substitutions:
FW	7	David Djigla		(substituted on) 69'
MF	4	Tidjani Anaane	(yellow card) 106'	(substituted on) 87'
MF	15	Sessi D'Almeida		(substituted on) 108'
Manager:
(France) Michel Dussuyer

Man of the Match:
(Benin) Stéphane Sessègnon

Assistant referees:
Jerson dos Santos (Angola)
Tesfagiorghis Berhe (Eritrea)
Fourth official:
Maguette Ndiaye (Senegal)

=== Uganda vs Senegal ===
5 July 2019
21:00

Uganda	0–1	Senegal
	Report	Mané 15'

Cairo International Stadium, Cairo
Attendance: 6,950
Referee: Mustapha Ghorbal (Algeria)

Uganda	Senegal

GK	18	Denis Onyango (c)	(yellow card) 5'
RB	5	Bevis Mugabi
CB	15	Godfrey Walusimbi
CB	16	Hassan Wasswa		(substituted off) 18'
LB	4	Murushid Juuko
CM	23	Micheal Azira
CM	8	Khalid Aucho	(yellow card) 31'	(substituted off) 77'
RW	22	Lumala Abdu
AM	17	Farouk Miya
LW	7	Emmanuel Okwi	(yellow card) 8'
CF	9	Patrick Kaddu		(substituted off) 57'
Substitutions:
DF	3	Timothy Awany		(substituted on) 18'
FW	21	Allan Kyambadde		(substituted on) 57'
MF	13	Allan Kateregga		(substituted on) 77'
Manager:
(France) Sébastien Desabre

GK	23	Alfred Gomis
RB	21	Lamine Gassama
CB	3	Kalidou Koulibaly	(yellow card) 70'
CB	8	Cheikhou Kouyaté (c)
LB	12	Youssouf Sabaly
CM	5	Idrissa Gueye
CM	17	Badou Ndiaye	(yellow card) 11'
RW	18	Ismaïla Sarr		(substituted off) 81'
AM	14	Henri Saivet		(substituted off) 69'
LW	10	Sadio Mané
CF	9	M'Baye Niang		(substituted off) 85'
Substitutions:
FW	15	Krépin Diatta		(substituted on) 69'
FW	11	Keita Baldé		(substituted on) 81'
FW	19	Mbaye Diagne		(substituted on) 85'
Manager:
(Senegal) Aliou Cissé

Man of the Match:
(Senegal) Idrissa Gueye

Assistant referees:
Abdelhak Etchiali (Algeria)
Mokrane Gourari (Algeria)
Fourth official:
Amin Omar (Egypt)

=== Nigeria vs Cameroon ===
6 July 2019
18:00

Nigeria	3–2	Cameroon
Ighalo 19', 63'; Iwobi 66'	Report	Bahoken 41'; N'Jie 44'

Alexandria Stadium, Alexandria
Attendance: 10,000
Referee: Joshua Bondo (Botswana)

Nigeria	Cameroon

GK	16	Daniel Akpeyi
RB	22	Kenneth Omeruo
CB	5	William Troost-Ekong
CB	4	Wilfred Ndidi
LB	20	Chidozie Awaziem	(yellow card) 70'
RM	2	Ola Aina
CM	8	Peter Etebo
LM	15	Moses Simon		(substituted off) 61'
AM	18	Alex Iwobi		(substituted off) 90+1'
AM	7	Ahmed Musa (c)
CF	9	Odion Ighalo		(substituted off) 85'
Substitutions:
FW	13	Samuel Chukwueze		(substituted on) 61'
FW	14	Paul Onuachu		(substituted on) 85'
DF	6	Leon Balogun		(substituted on) 90+1'
Manager:
(Germany) Gernot Rohr

GK	1	André Onana
RB	2	Collins Fai
CB	4	Banana Yaya
CB	5	Michael Ngadeu-Ngadjui
LB	6	Ambroise Oyongo
DM	14	Georges Mandjeck	(yellow card) 52'	(substituted off) 62'
RM	11	Christian Bassogog
CM	15	Pierre Kunde	(yellow card) 28'	(substituted off) 87'
LM	9	Stéphane Bahoken
SS	7	Clinton N'Jie		(substituted off) 70'
CF	13	Eric Maxim Choupo-Moting (c)
Substitutions:
MF	8	André-Frank Zambo Anguissa		(substituted on) 62'
FW	17	Karl Toko Ekambi		(substituted on) 70'
FW	19	Jacques Zoua		(substituted on) 87'
Manager:
(Netherlands) Clarence Seedorf

Man of the Match:
(Nigeria) Odion Ighalo

Assistant referees:
Oliver Safari (DR Congo)
Arsenio Maringule (Mozambique)
Fourth official:
Youssef Essrayri (Tunisia)

=== Egypt vs South Africa ===
6 July 2019
21:00

Egypt	0–1	South Africa
	Report	Lorch 85'

Cairo International Stadium, Cairo
Attendance: 75,000
Referee: Eric Otogo-Castane (Gabon)

Egypt	South Africa

GK	16	Mohamed El Shenawy
CB	20	Mahmoud Alaa
CB	6	Ahmed Hegazi
CB	12	Ayman Ashraf	(yellow card) 69'
RM	3	Ahmed Elmohamady (c)
CM	17	Mohamed Elneny		(substituted off) 83'
CM	8	Tarek Hamed
LM	7	Trézéguet
RF	10	Mohamed Salah
CF	9	Marwan Mohsen		(substituted off) 46'
LF	19	Abdallah El Said		(substituted off) 64'
Substitutions:
FW	14	Ahmed Ali		(substituted on) 46'
FW	22	Amr Warda		(substituted on) 64'
FW	11	Walid Soliman		(substituted on) 83'
Manager:
(Mexico) Javier Aguirre

GK	22	Ronwen Williams
RB	5	Thamsanqa Mkhize
CB	14	Thulani Hlatshwayo (c)	(yellow card) 90+4'
CB	2	Buhle Mkhwanazi
LB	18	Sifiso Hlanti	(yellow card) 44'
DM	12	Kamohelo Mokotjo
CM	15	Dean Furman		(substituted off) 90+2'
CM	8	Bongani Zungu	(yellow card) 79'
RF	19	Percy Tau
CF	9	Lebo Mothiba
LF	23	Thembinkosi Lorch		(substituted off) 90+3'
Substitutions:
MF	20	Hlompho Kekana		(substituted on) 90+2'
FW	21	Lars Veldwijk		(substituted on) 90+3'
Manager:
(England) Stuart Baxter

Man of the Match:
(South Africa) Thembinkosi Lorch

Assistant referees:
Issa Yaya (Chad)
Lionel Andrianantenaiana (Madagascar)
Fourth official:
Sidi Alioum (Cameroon)

=== Madagascar vs DR Congo ===
7 July 2019
18:00

Madagascar	2–2 (a.e.t.)	DR Congo
Amada 9'; Andriatsima 77'	Report	Bakambu 21'; Mbemba 90'
Penalties
Amada (penalty scored); Métanire (penalty scored); Fontaine (penalty scored); Mombris (penalty scored)	4–2	(penalty missed) Tisserand; (penalty scored) Bakambu; (penalty scored) M'Poku; (penalty missed) Bolasie

Alexandria Stadium, Alexandria
Attendance: 5,890
Referee: Noureddine El Jaafari (Morocco)

Madagascar	DR Congo

GK	23	Melvin Adrien
RB	20	Romain Métanire
CB	21	Thomas Fontaine
CB	5	Pascal Razakanantenaina
LB	15	Ibrahim Amada
CM	13	Anicet Abel
CM	18	Rayan Raveloson		(substituted off) 58'
CM	12	Lalaïna Nomenjanahary		(substituted off) 88'
RF	2	Carolus Andriamatsinoro		(substituted off) 106'
CF	9	Faneva Imà Andriatsima (c)		(substituted off) 112'
LF	22	Jérôme Mombris
Substitutions:
MF	8	Arohasina Andrianarimanana		(substituted on) 58'
MF	7	Dimitry Caloin		(substituted on) 88'
DF	14	Jérémy Morel	(yellow card) 114'	(substituted on) 106'
FW	10	Njiva Rakotoharimalala		(substituted on) 112'
Manager:
(France) Nicolas Dupuis

GK	1	Ley Matampi
CB	12	Wilfred Moke		(substituted off) 46'
CB	22	Chancel Mbemba
CB	5	Marcel Tisserand
RWB	2	Issama Mpeko	(yellow card) 97'
LWB	3	Ngonda Muzinga
CM	6	Chadrac Akolo		(substituted off) 70'
CM	7	Youssouf Mulumbu (c)	(yellow card) 45+1'	(substituted off) 67'
CM	20	Jacques Maghoma
CF	19	Britt Assombalonga		(substituted off) 91'
CF	17	Cédric Bakambu
Substitutions:
FW	13	Meschak Elia		(substituted on) 46'
MF	18	Bokadi Bopé		(substituted on) 67'
FW	11	Yannick Bolasie		(substituted on) 70'
MF	10	Paul-José M'Poku		(substituted on) 91'
Manager:
(Democratic Republic of the Congo) Florent Ibengé

Man of the Match:
(Madagascar) Anicet Abel

Assistant referees:
Azgaou Lahcen (Morocco)
Mustapha Akarkad (Morocco)
Fourth official:
Redouane Jiyed (Morocco)

=== Algeria vs Guinea ===
7 July 2019
21:00

Algeria	3–0	Guinea
Belaïli 24'; Mahrez 57'; Ounas 82'	Report

30 June Stadium, Cairo
Attendance: 8,205
Referee: Bernard Camille (Seychelles)

Algeria	Guinea

GK	23	Raïs M'Bolhi
CB	2	Aïssa Mandi
CB	4	Djamel Benlamri
CB	21	Ramy Bensebaini
RM	20	Youcef Atal
CM	17	Adlène Guedioura	(yellow card) 14'	(substituted off) 81'
CM	22	Ismaël Bennacer
LM	8	Youcef Belaïli		(substituted off) 76'
RF	7	Riyad Mahrez (c)
CF	9	Baghdad Bounedjah		(substituted off) 84'
LF	10	Sofiane Feghouli
Substitutions:
MF	12	Adam Ounas		(substituted on) 76'
MF	14	Hicham Boudaoui		(substituted on) 81'
FW	15	Andy Delort		(substituted on) 84'
Manager:
(Algeria) Djamel Belmadi

GK	12	Ibrahim Koné
RB	18	Mikael Dyrestam
CB	6	Simon Falette
CB	5	Ernest Seka
LB	3	Issiaga Sylla
DM	4	Amadou Diawara
RM	13	Ibrahima Cissé		(substituted off) 68'
CM	7	Mady Camara	(yellow card) 6'
LM	16	Ibrahima Traoré (c)
CF	9	José Kanté	(yellow card) 54'	(substituted off) 56'
CF	2	Mohamed Yattara		(substituted off) 79'
Substitutions:
FW	19	Bengali-Fodé Koita		(substituted on) 56'
FW	20	Lass Bangoura		(substituted on) 68'
FW	10	François Kamano		(substituted on) 79'
Manager:
(Belgium) Paul Put

Man of the Match:
(Algeria) Riyad Mahrez

Assistant referees:
Evarist Menkouande (Cameroon)
Mohammed Ibrahim (Sudan)
Fourth official:
Louis Hakizimana (Rwanda)

=== Mali vs Ivory Coast ===
8 July 2019
18:00

Mali	0–1	Ivory Coast
	Report	Zaha 76'

Suez Stadium, Suez
Attendance: 7,672
Referee: Janny Sikazwe (Zambia)

Mali	Ivory Coast

GK	16	Djigui Diarra
RB	2	Hamari Traoré
CB	15	Mamadou Fofana
CB	13	Molla Wagué
LB	3	Youssouf Koné
DM	8	Diadie Samassékou
CM	4	Amadou Haidara		(substituted off) 63'
CM	11	Lassana Coulibaly	(yellow card) 36'	(substituted off) 80'
RF	23	Abdoulay Diaby (c)		(substituted off) 53'
CF	9	Moussa Marega
LF	19	Moussa Djenepo
Substitutions:
MF	14	Adama Malouda Traoré		(substituted on) 53'
MF	21	Adama Noss Traoré		(substituted on) 63'
FW	10	Kalifa Coulibaly		(substituted on) 80'
Manager:
(Mali) Mohamed Magassouba

GK	16	Sylvain Gbohouo
CB	4	Jean-Philippe Gbamin
CB	6	Ismaël Traoré
CB	5	Wilfried Kanon
RWB	22	Mamadou Bagayoko	(yellow card) 62'
LWB	2	Wonlo Coulibaly
DM	20	Serey Dié (c)
RM	19	Nicolas Pépé		(substituted off) 68'
CM	8	Franck Kessié
LM	9	Wilfried Zaha
CF	14	Jonathan Kodjia		(substituted off) 85'
Substitutions:
MF	11	Maxwel Cornet		(substituted on) 68'
FW	12	Wilfried Bony		(substituted on) 85'
Manager:
(Ivory Coast) Ibrahim Kamara

Man of the Match:
(Mali) Moussa Marega

Assistant referees:
Waleed Ahmed Ali (Sudan)
Gilbert Cheruiyot (Kenya)
Fourth official:
Bakary Gassama (Gambia)

=== Ghana vs Tunisia ===
8 July 2019
21:00

Ghana	1–1 (a.e.t.)	Tunisia
Bedoui 90+2' (o.g.)	Report	Khenissi 73'
Penalties
Wakaso (penalty scored); J. Ayew (penalty scored); Ekuban (penalty missed); Agbenyenu (penalty scored); Partey (penalty scored)	4–5	(penalty scored) Sliti; (penalty scored) Khazri; (penalty scored) Bronn; (penalty scored) Meriah; (penalty scored) Sassi

Ismailia Stadium, Ismailia
Attendance: 8,890
Referee: Victor Gomes (South Africa)

Ghana	Tunisia

GK	1	Richard Ofori
RB	22	Andy Yiadom
CB	21	John Boye	(yellow card) 11'
CB	15	Kasim Nuhu	(yellow card) 90'
LB	17	Baba Rahman		(substituted off) 117'
DM	5	Thomas Partey
CM	11	Mubarak Wakaso	(yellow card) 87'
CM	6	Afriyie Acquah		(substituted off) 75'
RF	19	Samuel Owusu		(substituted off) 108'
CF	9	Jordan Ayew
LF	10	André Ayew (c)		(substituted off) 84'
Substitutions:
FW	13	Caleb Ekuban		(substituted on) 75'
FW	3	Asamoah Gyan		(substituted on) 84'
FW	8	Owusu Kwabena		(substituted on) 108'
DF	14	Lumor Agbenyenu		(substituted on) 117'
Manager:
(Ghana) James Kwesi Appiah

GK	16	Mouez Hassen		(substituted off) 120+1'
RB	2	Wajdi Kechrida
CB	3	Dylan Bronn	(yellow card) 12'
CB	4	Yassine Meriah
LB	5	Oussama Haddadi
DM	17	Ellyes Skhiri
CM	20	Ghailene Chaalali
CM	13	Ferjani Sassi
RF	9	Anice Badri		(substituted off) 68'
CF	11	Taha Yassine Khenissi		(substituted off) 90'
LF	7	Youssef Msakni (c)	(yellow card) 49'	(substituted off) 83'
Substitutions:
FW	10	Wahbi Khazri		(substituted on) 68'
FW	23	Naïm Sliti		(substituted on) 83'
DF	6	Rami Bedoui		(substituted on) 90'
GK	1	Farouk Ben Mustapha		(substituted on) 120+1'
Manager:
(France) Alain Giresse

Man of the Match:
(Ghana) Mubarak Wakaso

Assistant referees:
Zakhele Siwela (South Africa)
Souru Phatsoane (Lesotho)
Fourth official:
Jean-Jacques Ngambo (DR Congo)

== Quarter-finals ==
=== Senegal vs Benin ===
10 July 2019
18:00

Senegal	1–0	Benin
Gueye 70'	Report

30 June Stadium, Cairo
Attendance: 5,798
Referee: Mustapha Ghorbal (Algeria)

Senegal	Benin

GK	23	Alfred Gomis
RB	21	Lamine Gassama
CB	3	Kalidou Koulibaly
CB	8	Cheikhou Kouyaté (c)
LB	12	Youssouf Sabaly
CM	5	Idrissa Gueye		(substituted off) 89'
CM	17	Badou Ndiaye
RW	11	Keita Baldé		(substituted off) 65'
AM	14	Henri Saivet
LW	10	Sadio Mané	(yellow card) 90+1'
CF	9	M'Baye Niang		(substituted off) 64'
Substitutions:
FW	19	Mbaye Diagne		(substituted on) 64'
FW	15	Krépin Diatta		(substituted on) 65'
DF	6	Salif Sané		(substituted on) 89'
Manager:
(Senegal) Aliou Cissé

GK	16	Saturnin Allagbé
CB	2	Séidou Barazé
CB	6	Olivier Verdon	(red card) 83'
CB	13	Moise Adilehou
RM	14	Cebio Soukou	(yellow card) 44'	(substituted off) 81'
CM	8	Jordan Adéoti
CM	15	Sessi D'Almeida		(substituted off) 68'
LM	11	Emmanuel Imorou
AM	17	Stéphane Sessègnon (c)
CF	9	Steve Mounié	(yellow card) 90+3'
CF	10	Mickaël Poté		(substituted off) 77'
Substitutions:
MF	18	Mama Séïbou		(substituted on) 68'
FW	20	Jodel Dossou		(substituted on) 77'
FW	7	David Djigla		(substituted on) 81'
Manager:
(France) Michel Dussuyer

Man of the Match:
Idrissa Gueye (Senegal)

Assistant referees:
Mahmoud Abouelregal (Egypt)
Mokrane Gourari (Algeria)
Fourth official:
Gehad Grisha (Egypt)
Fifth official:
Anouar Hmila (Tunisia)
Video assistant referee:
Pol van Boekel (Netherlands)
Assistant video assistant referees:
Bakary Gassama (Gambia)
Zakhele Siwela (South Africa)

=== Nigeria vs South Africa ===
10 July 2019
21:00

Nigeria	2–1	South Africa
Chukwueze 27'; Troost-Ekong 89'	Report	Zungu 71'

Cairo International Stadium, Cairo
Attendance: 48,343
Referee: Rédouane Jiyed (Morocco)

Nigeria	South Africa

GK	16	Daniel Akpeyi
RB	22	Kenneth Omeruo
CB	5	William Troost-Ekong
CB	4	Wilfred Ndidi
LB	20	Chidozie Awaziem
RM	13	Samuel Chukwueze
CM	8	Peter Etebo
LM	3	Jamilu Collins
AM	18	Alex Iwobi		(substituted off) 90+1'
AM	7	Ahmed Musa (c)	(yellow card) 35'	(substituted off) 81'
CF	9	Odion Ighalo
Substitutions:
FW	15	Moses Simon		(substituted on) 81'
DF	6	Leon Balogun		(substituted on) 90+1'
Manager:
(Germany) Gernot Rohr

GK	22	Ronwen Williams
RB	5	Thamsanqa Mkhize	(yellow card) 75'
CB	14	Thulani Hlatshwayo (c)	(yellow card) 49'
CB	2	Buhle Mkhwanazi
LB	18	Sifiso Hlanti
DM	12	Kamohelo Mokotjo
CM	15	Dean Furman
CM	8	Bongani Zungu
RF	19	Percy Tau	(yellow card) 62'
CF	9	Lebo Mothiba	(yellow card) 14'	(substituted off) 86'
LF	23	Thembinkosi Lorch		(substituted off) 58'
Substitutions:
MF	11	Themba Zwane		(substituted on) 58'
FW	21	Lars Veldwijk		(substituted on) 86'
Manager:
(England) Stuart Baxter

Man of the Match:
Samuel Chukwueze (Nigeria)

Assistant referees:
Azgaou Lahcen (Morocco)
Mustapha Akarkad (Morocco)
Fourth official:
Bernard Camille (Seychelles)
Fifth official:
Issa Yaya (Chad)
Video assistant referee:
Benoît Millot (France)
Assistant video assistant referees:
Janny Sikazwe (Zambia)
El Hadji Malick Samba (Senegal)

=== Ivory Coast vs Algeria ===
11 July 2019
18:00

Ivory Coast	1–1 (a.e.t.)	Algeria
Kodjia 62'	Report	Feghouli 20'
Penalties
Kessié (penalty scored); Cornet (penalty scored); Bony (penalty missed); Gradel (penalty scored); Dié (penalty missed)	3–4	(penalty scored) Bensebaini; (penalty scored) Slimani; (penalty scored) Delort; (penalty scored) Ounas; (penalty missed) Belaïli

Suez Stadium, Suez
Attendance: 8,233
Referee: Bamlak Tessema Weyesa (Ethiopia)

Ivory Coast	Algeria

GK	16	Sylvain Gbohouo	(yellow card) 46'
RB	22	Mamadou Bagayoko	(yellow card) 43'
CB	6	Ismaël Traoré
CB	5	Wilfried Kanon		(substituted off) 54'
LB	2	Wonlo Coulibaly
DM	18	Ibrahim Sangaré		(substituted off) 78'
DM	20	Serey Dié (c)
CM	8	Franck Kessié	(yellow card) 88'
RF	9	Wilfried Zaha	(yellow card) 29'	(substituted off) 94'
CF	14	Jonathan Kodjia		(substituted off) 96'
LF	15	Max Gradel
Substitutions:
DF	21	Cheick Comara	(yellow card) 120'	(substituted on) 54'
DF	4	Jean-Philippe Gbamin		(substituted on) 78'
FW	11	Maxwel Cornet		(substituted on) 96'
FW	12	Wilfried Bony		(substituted on) 96'
Manager:
(Ivory Coast) Ibrahim Kamara

GK	23	Raïs M'Bolhi
CB	2	Aïssa Mandi
CB	4	Djamel Benlamri
CB	21	Ramy Bensebaini	(yellow card) 29'
RM	20	Youcef Atal		(substituted off) 30'
CM	17	Adlène Guedioura
CM	22	Ismaël Bennacer	(yellow card) 39'
LM	8	Youcef Belaïli
RF	7	Riyad Mahrez (c)		(substituted off) 86'
CF	9	Baghdad Bounedjah		(substituted off) 78'
LF	10	Sofiane Feghouli		(substituted off) 120+1'
Substitutions:
DF	18	Mehdi Zeffane		(substituted on) 30'
FW	13	Islam Slimani		(substituted on) 78'
MF	12	Adam Ounas		(substituted on) 86'
FW	15	Andy Delort		(substituted on) 120+1'
Manager:
(Algeria) Djamel Belmadi

Man of the Match:
Sylvain Gbohouo (Ivory Coast)

Assistant referees:
Waleed Ahmed Ali (Sudan)
Oliver Safari (DR Congo)
Fourth official:
Victor Gomes (South Africa)
Fifth official:
Lionel Andrianantenaina (Madagascar)
Video assistant referee:
Bakary Gassama (Gambia)
Assistant video assistant referees:
Pol van Boekel (Netherlands)
Zakhele Siwela (South Africa)

=== Madagascar vs Tunisia ===
11 July 2019
21:00

Madagascar	0–3	Tunisia
	Report	Sassi 52'; Msakni 60'; Sliti 90+3'

Al Salam Stadium, Cairo
Attendance: 7,568
Referee: Sidi Alioum (Cameroon)

Madagascar	Tunisia

GK	23	Melvin Adrien
RB	20	Romain Métanire
CB	21	Thomas Fontaine
CB	5	Pascal Razakanantenaina		(substituted off) 66'
LB	15	Ibrahim Amada
DM	6	Marco Ilaimaharitra		(substituted off) 77'
CM	13	Anicet Abel	(yellow card) 86'
CM	12	Lalaïna Nomenjanahary		(substituted off) 66'
RF	2	Carolus Andriamatsinoro
CF	9	Faneva Imà Andriatsima (c)
LF	22	Jérôme Mombris
Substitutions:
FW	11	Paulin Voavy		(substituted on) 66'
DF	14	Jérémy Morel		(substituted on) 66'
FW	10	Njiva Rakotoharimalala		(substituted on) 77'
Manager:
(France) Nicolas Dupuis

GK	16	Mouez Hassen
RB	2	Wajdi Kechrida
CB	4	Yassine Meriah
CB	3	Dylan Bronn
LB	5	Oussama Haddadi
DM	17	Ellyes Skhiri
CM	20	Ghaylen Chaaleli	(substituted off) 75'
CM	13	Ferjani Sassi	(substituted off) 83'
RF	7	Youssef Msakni (c)	(substituted off) 66'
CF	11	Taha Yassine Khenissi
LF	10	Wahbi Khazri
Substitutions:
FW	23	Naïm Sliti	(substituted on) 66'
DF	14	Mohamed Dräger	(substituted on) 75'
DF	12	Karim Aouadhi	(substituted on) 83'
Manager:
(France) Alain Giresse

Man of the Match:
Ferjani Sassi (Tunisia)

Assistant referees:
Evarist Menkouande (Cameroon)
Elvis Nguegoue (Cameroon)
Fourth official:
Eric Otogo-Castane (Gabon)
Fifth official:
Seydou Tiama (Burkina Faso)
Video assistant referee:
Benoît Millot (France)
Assistant video assistant referees:
Mustapha Ghorbal (Algeria)
El Hadji Malick Samba (Senegal)

== Semi-finals ==
=== Senegal vs Tunisia ===
14 July 2019
18:00

Senegal	1–0 (a.e.t.)	Tunisia
Bronn 101' (o.g.)	Report

30 June Stadium, Cairo
Attendance: 9,143
Referee: Bamlak Tessema Weyesa (Ethiopia)

Senegal	Tunisia

GK	23	Alfred Gomis
RB	21	Lamine Gassama		(substituted off) 110'
CB	3	Kalidou Koulibaly	(yellow card) 73'
CB	8	Cheikhou Kouyaté (c)
LB	12	Youssouf Sabaly
CM	5	Idrissa Gueye
CM	17	Badou Ndiaye		(substituted off) 81'
RW	15	Krépin Diatta		(substituted off) 68'
AM	14	Henri Saivet
LW	10	Sadio Mané
CF	9	M'Baye Niang		(substituted off) 64'
Substitutions:
FW	19	Mbaye Diagne		(substituted on) 64'
FW	18	Ismaïla Sarr		(substituted on) 68'
DF	6	Salif Sané		(substituted on) 81'
DF	22	Moussa Wagué		(substituted on) 110'
Manager:
(Senegal) Aliou Cissé

GK	16	Mouez Hassen
RB	14	Mohamed Dräger
CB	3	Dylan Bronn
CB	4	Yassine Meriah
LB	5	Oussama Haddadi
DM	17	Ellyes Skhiri
RM	7	Youssef Msakni (c)		(substituted off) 46'
CM	13	Ferjani Sassi		(substituted off) 105'
LM	10	Wahbi Khazri	(yellow card) 64'
SS	19	Ayman Ben Mohamed		(substituted off) 82'
CF	11	Taha Yassine Khenissi		(substituted off) 117'
Substitutions:
FW	23	Naïm Sliti	(yellow card) 76'	(substituted on) 46'
MF	20	Ghailene Chaalali		(substituted on) 82'
FW	9	Anice Badri		(substituted on) 105'
FW	8	Firas Chaouat		(substituted on) 117'
Manager:
(France) Alain Giresse

Man of the Match:
Alfred Gomis (Senegal)

Assistant referees:
Waleed Ahmed Ali (Sudan)
Oliver Safari (DR Congo)
Fourth official:
Bernard Camille (Seychelles)
Fifth official:
Lionel Andrianantenaina (Madagascar)
Video assistant referee:
Benoît Millot (France)
Assistant video assistant referees:
Rédouane Jiyed (Morocco)
Mahmoud Abouelregal (Egypt)

=== Algeria vs Nigeria ===
14 July 2019
21:00

Algeria	2–1	Nigeria
Troost-Ekong 40' (o.g.); Mahrez 90+5'	Report	Ighalo 72' (pen.)

Cairo International Stadium, Cairo
Attendance: 49,775
Referee: Bakary Gassama (Gambia)

Algeria	Nigeria

GK	23	Raïs M'Bolhi
CB	2	Aïssa Mandi	(yellow card) 71'
CB	4	Djamel Benlamri
CB	21	Ramy Bensebaini
RM	18	Mehdi Zeffane
CM	17	Adlène Guedioura
CM	22	Ismaël Bennacer
LM	8	Youcef Belaïli
RF	7	Riyad Mahrez (c)
CF	9	Baghdad Bounedjah	(yellow card) 52'
LF	10	Sofiane Feghouli	(yellow card) 68'
Manager:
(Algeria) Djamel Belmadi

GK	16	Daniel Akpeyi
RB	22	Kenneth Omeruo
CB	5	William Troost-Ekong
CB	4	Wilfred Ndidi
LB	20	Chidozie Awaziem	(yellow card) 88'
RM	13	Samuel Chukwueze		(substituted off) 78'
CM	8	Peter Etebo
LM	3	Jamilu Collins
AM	18	Alex Iwobi
AM	7	Ahmed Musa (c)
CF	9	Odion Ighalo
Substitutions:
FW	11	Henry Onyekuru		(substituted on) 78'
Manager:
(Germany) Gernot Rohr

Man of the Match:
Riyad Mahrez (Algeria)

Assistant referees:
El Hadji Malick Samba (Senegal)
Seydou Tiama (Burkina Faso)
Fourth official:
Victor Gomes (South Africa)
Fifth official:
Issa Yaya (Chad)
Video assistant referee:
Pol van Boekel (Netherlands)
Assistant video assistant referees:
Janny Sikazwe (Zambia)
Zakhele Siwela (South Africa)

== Third place play-off ==
17 July 2019
21:00

Tunisia	0–1	Nigeria
	Report	Ighalo 3'

Al Salam Stadium, Cairo
Attendance: 6,340
Referee: Gehad Grisha (Egypt)

Tunisia	Nigeria

GK	22	Moez Ben Cherifia
RB	14	Mohamed Dräger
CB	21	Nassim Hnid		(substituted off) 67'
CB	4	Yassine Meriah
LB	5	Oussama Haddadi
DM	17	Ellyes Skhiri
CM	13	Ferjani Sassi
CM	20	Ghailene Chaalali	(yellow card) 61'
RF	9	Anice Badri		(substituted off) 58'
CF	11	Taha Yassine Khenissi		(substituted off) 44'
LF	10	Wahbi Khazri (c)
Substitutions:
FW	8	Firas Chaouat		(substituted on) 44'
FW	23	Naïm Sliti		(substituted on) 58'
DF	6	Rami Bedoui	(yellow card) 90+2'	(substituted on) 67'
Manager:
(France) Alain Giresse

GK	23	Francis Uzoho
RB	2	Ola Aina
CB	5	William Troost-Ekong
CB	22	Kenneth Omeruo
LB	3	Jamilu Collins
DM	4	Wilfred Ndidi	(yellow card) 18'
RM	13	Samuel Chukwueze		(substituted off) 90'
CM	8	Peter Etebo
LM	7	Ahmed Musa (c)		(substituted off) 75'
SS	18	Alex Iwobi
CF	9	Odion Ighalo		(substituted off) 46'
Substitutions:
FW	21	Victor Osimhen		(substituted on) 46'
FW	15	Moses Simon		(substituted on) 75'
FW	17	Samuel Kalu		(substituted on) 90'
Manager:
(Germany) Gernot Rohr

Man of the Match:
William Troost-Ekong (Nigeria)

Assistant referees:
Abouelregal Mahmoud (Egypt)
Issa Yaya (Chad)
Fourth official:
Joshua Bondo (Botswana)
Fifth official:
Lionel Andrianantenaina (Madagascar)
Video assistant referee:
Pol van Boekel (Netherlands)
Assistant video assistant referees:
Janny Sikazwe (Zambia)
El Hadji Malick Samba (Senegal)

== Final ==
19 July 2019
21:00

Senegal	0–1	Algeria
	Report	Bounedjah 2'

Cairo International Stadium, Cairo
Attendance: 75,000
Referee: Sidi Alioum (Cameroon)

Senegal	Algeria

GK	23	Alfred Gomis
RB	21	Lamine Gassama	(yellow card) 80'
CB	6	Salif Sané
CB	8	Cheikhou Kouyaté (c)
LB	12	Youssouf Sabaly
CM	5	Idrissa Gueye	(yellow card) 79'
CM	17	Badou Ndiaye		(substituted off) 59'
RW	18	Ismaïla Sarr
AM	14	Henri Saivet		(substituted off) 75'
LW	10	Sadio Mané
CF	9	M'Baye Niang		(substituted off) 85'
Substitutions:
FW	15	Krépin Diatta		(substituted on) 59'
FW	19	Mbaye Diagne		(substituted on) 75'
FW	11	Keita Baldé		(substituted on) 85'
Manager:
Aliou Cissé

GK	23	Raïs M'Bolhi
CB	2	Aïssa Mandi	(yellow card) 90+2'
CB	4	Djamel Benlamri
CB	21	Ramy Bensebaini	(yellow card) 33'
RM	18	Mehdi Zeffane
CM	17	Adlène Guedioura	(yellow card) 90+4'
CM	22	Ismaël Bennacer
LM	8	Youcef Belaïli	(yellow card) 54'	(substituted off) 84'
RF	7	Riyad Mahrez (c)
CF	9	Baghdad Bounedjah		(substituted off) 89'
LF	10	Sofiane Feghouli		(substituted off) 85'
Substitutions:
MF	11	Yacine Brahimi		(substituted on) 84'
DF	3	Mehdi Tahrat		(substituted on) 85'
FW	13	Islam Slimani		(substituted on) 89'
Manager:
Djamel Belmadi

Man of the Match:
Rais M'Bolhi (Algeria)

Assistant referees:
Evarist Menkouande (Cameroon)
Nguegoue Elvis Guy Noupue (Cameroon)
Fourth official:
Eric Otogo-Castane (Gabon)
Reserve assistant referee:
Waleed Ahmed Ali (Sudan)
Video assistant referee:
Benoît Millot (France)
Assistant video assistant referees:
Bakary Gassama (Gambia)
Zakhele Thusi Siwela (South Africa)
