= Bongani Zungu =

South African soccer player (born 1992)

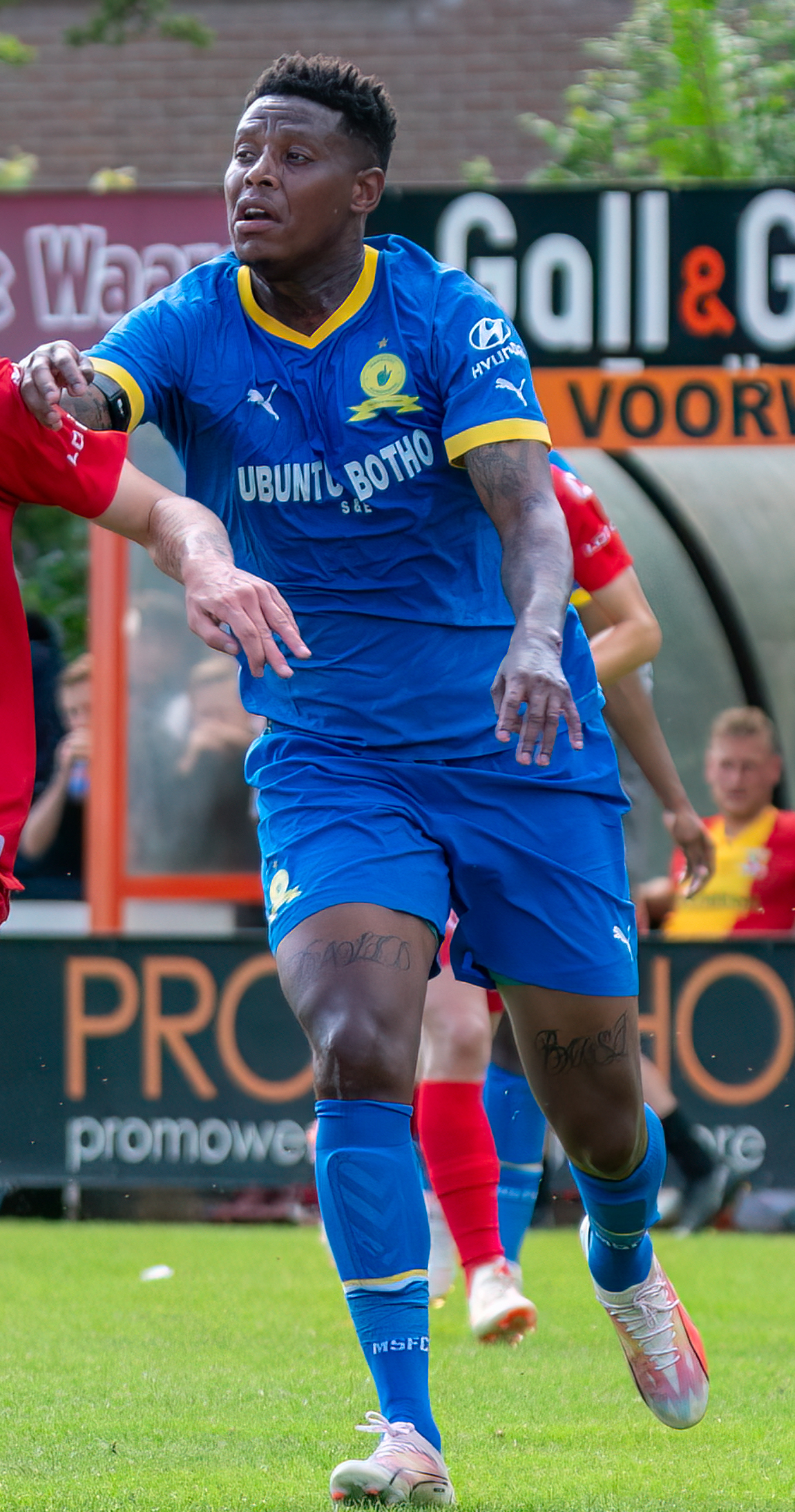
- Zungu with Mamelodi Sundowns in 2023

Personal information
- Date of birth: 9 October 1992 (age 34)
- Place of birth: Duduza, South Africa
- Height: 1.84 m (6 ft 0 in)
- Position: Midfielder

Team information
- Current team: Malappuram
- Number: 22

Youth career
- 2010–2012: Dynamos

Senior career*
Years	Team	Apps	(Gls)
2012–2013	University of Pretoria	25	(7)
2013–2016	Mamelodi Sundowns	58	(1)
2016–2017	Vitória Guimarães	19	(1)
2017–2022	Amiens	67	(2)
2020–2021	→ Rangers (loan)	14	(0)
2022–2024	Mamelodi Sundowns	23	(1)
2024–2026	AmaZulu	20	(1)
2026-	Malappuram	3	(0)

International career^{‡}
2013–2021	South Africa	30	(5)
- * Club domestic league appearances and goals as of September 2026 ‡ National team caps and goals as of 8 February 2023 (UTC)

Bongani Zungu (born 9 October 1992) is a South African professional footballer who plays as a midfielder for Indian club Malappuram. He also played for the South Africa national team.

== Club career ==
Having joined the University of Pretoria from Dynamos at the start of the 2012–13 season, Zungu helped AmaTuks to a top eight finish in the club's debut campaign in the PSL. At the end of the season it was announced that Zungu would be joining Mamelodi Sundowns in a swap deal, with Buhle Mkhwanazi and Siyabonga Ngubane joining University of Pretoria.

Zungu suffered a hairline fracture of the shin in a 3–2 win over Maritzburg United, ruling him out for up to twelve weeks. Despite missing most of the second half of the 2015–16 season, Zungu had the perfect send off from Sundowns with the club lifting the PSL title in May 2016.

On 20 January 2016, Zungu's agent Steve Kapeluschnik confirmed that he would be joining Portuguese side Vitória de Guimarães upon the expiration of his contract at the end of the season. After a season in Portugal, Zungu moved to French club Amiens.

Zungu signed for Scottish club Rangers on loan from Amiens in October 2020. Rangers secured an option to sign him permanently for a £2.7 million transfer fee. In February 2021 he was one of five Rangers players fined by Scottish police "for attending an illegal gathering of 10 people in a flat" in breach of lockdown rules during the COVID-19 pandemic in the United Kingdom.

Zungu rejoined the Mamelodi Sundowns in August 2022 before leaving the team in June 2024.

He joined Amazulu in December 2024.

Zungu moved to Indian club Malappuram in August 2026.

== International career ==
Zungu made his debut for South Africa in a 2–0 win against Burkina Faso on 17 August 2013. He scored his first international goal against Swaziland on 15 November 2013, with South Africa winning 3–0.

== Personal life ==
In July 2014 Zungu was a victim of a hi-jacking when a group of armed men made off with his car outside his home in Duduza.

He and his partner Cindy Mahlangu had their first child in 2022.

== Career statistics ==
=== Club ===
As of match played 1 July 2022

Appearances and goals by club, season and competition
Club	Season	League			National cup		League cup		Continental		Other		Total	
Club	Season	Division	Apps	Goals	Apps	Goals	Apps	Goals	Apps	Goals	Apps	Goals	Apps	Goals
University of Pretoria	2012–13	Premier Division	25	7	1	0	1	0	—		0	0	27	7
Mamelodi Sundowns	2013–14	Premier Division	22	1	2	0	2	0	0	0	0	0	26	1
Mamelodi Sundowns	2014–15	Premier Division	23	0	5	0	1	0	2	0	1 (Note: Appearance in the MTN 8 Cup)	0	32	0
Mamelodi Sundowns	2015–16	Premier Division	13	0	0	0	4	2	0	0	0	0	17	2
Mamelodi Sundowns	Total		58	1	7	0	7	2	2	0	1	0	75	3
Vitória Guimarães	2016–17	Primeira Liga	16	0	5	1	2	1	—		—		23	2
Vitória Guimarães	2017–18	Primeira Liga	3	1	0	0	0	0	0	0	1 (Note: Appearance in the Supertaça Cup)	0	4	1
Vitória Guimarães	Total		19	1	5	1	2	1	0	0	1	0	27	3
Amiens	2017–18	Ligue 1	26	1	0	0	2	0	—		—		28	1
Amiens	2018–19	Ligue 1	5	0	0	0	0	0	—		—		5	0
Amiens	2019–20	Ligue 1	21	1	0	0	3	1	—		—		24	2
Amiens	2020–21	Ligue 2	2	0	0	0	0	0	—		—		2	0
Amiens	2021–22	Ligue 2	13	0	3	0	0	0	—		—		16	0
Amiens	Total		67	2	3	0	5	1	0	0	0	0	75	3
Rangers (on loan)	2020–21	Scottish Premiership	14	0	0	0	2	0	5	0	0	0	21	0
Career total			183	11	16	1	17	4	7	0	2	0	225	16

=== International ===
As of matches played on 23 February 2021

Appearances and goals by national team and year
National team	Year	Apps	Goals
South Africa	2013	6	1
South Africa	2014	3	0
South Africa	2015	9	1
South Africa	2016	0	0
South Africa	2017	4	0
South Africa	2018	1	0
South Africa	2019	5	2
South Africa	2020	2	1
Total		30	5

Scores and results list South Africa's goal tally first, score column indicates score after each Zungu goal.

List of international goals scored by Bongani Zungu
No.	Date	Venue	Opponent	Score	Result	Competition
1	15 November 2013	Somhlolo National Stadium, Lobamba, Swaziland	Swaziland	1–0	3–0	Friendly
2	29 March 2015	Mbombela Stadium, Nelspruit, South Africa	Nigeria	1–1	1–1	Friendly
3	28 June 2019	Al Salam Stadium, Cairo, Egypt	Namibia	1–0	1–0	2019 Africa Cup of Nations
4	10 July 2019	Cairo International Stadium, Cairo, Egypt	Nigeria	1–1	1–2	2019 Africa Cup of Nations
5	13 November 2020	Moses Mabhida Stadium, Durban, South Africa	São Tomé and Príncipe	2–0	2-0	2021 Africa Cup of Nations qualification

== Honours ==
Mamelodi Sundowns

- PSL: 2013–14; 2015–16
- Nedbank Cup: 2014–15
- Telkom Knockout: 2015–16
- African Football League : 2022

Rangers

- Scottish Premiership: 2020–21
