= Joslin Kamatuka =

Namibian footballer

Personal information
- Full name: Joslin Mbatjiua Kamatuka
- Date of birth: 22 July 1991 (age 35)
- Place of birth: Windhoek, Namibia
- Height: 1.75 m (5 ft 9 in)
- Position: Midfielder

Team information
- Current team: Durban City
- Number: 14

Senior career*
Years	Team	Apps	(Gls)
2010–2011	Nashua Young Ones		
2011–2013	SK Windhoek		
2013–2016	African Stars		
2016–2018	United Africa Tigers		
2018–2020	Cape Umoya United	35	(7)
2021–2022	Baroka	23	(1)
2022–2023	African Stars		
2023–	Maritzburg United/Durban City	15	(5)

International career^{‡}
2015–	Namibia	33	(4)
- * Club domestic league appearances and goals as of 11 January 2024 ‡ National team caps and goals as of 16 June 2026

Joslin Mbatjiua Kamatuka (born 27 July 1991) is a Namibian football player. He plays in South Africa for Durban City.

== International ==
He made his Namibia national football team debut on 19 May 2015 in a 2015 COSAFA Cup game against Mauritius.

He was selected for the 2019 Africa Cup of Nations squad and scored his country's only goal in the tournament, in the last group game against the Ivory Coast on 1 July 2019.

== Career statistics ==
=== International ===
As of match played on 5 September 2025

Appearances and goals by national team and year
National team	Year	Apps	Goals
Namibia	2015	4	0
Namibia	2016	–	
Namibia	2017	–	
Namibia	2018	–	
Namibia	2019	10	2
Namibia	2020	1	0
Namibia	2021	5	1
Namibia	2022	–	
Namibia	2023	5	0
Namibia	2024	2	0
Namibia	2025	6	1
Total		33	4

Scores and results list Namibia's goal tally first, score column indicates score after each Kamatuka goal.

List of international goals scored by Joslin Kamatuka
No.	Date	Venue	Opponent	Score	Result	Competition
1	26 May 2019	King Zwelithini Stadium, Umlazi, South Africa	Mozambique	1–0	2–1	2019 COSAFA Cup
2	1 July 2019	30 June Stadium, Cairo, Egypt	Ivory Coast	1–2	1–4	2019 Africa Cup of Nations
3	9 October 2021	Stade Lat-Dior, Thiès, Senegal	Senegal	1–3	1–4	2022 FIFA World Cup qualification
4	10 June 2025	Dr. Petrus Molemela Stadium, Bloemfontein, South Africa	Lesotho	3–0	3–0	2025 COSAFA Cup
