= Boubacar Barry =

Ivorian footballer (born 1979)

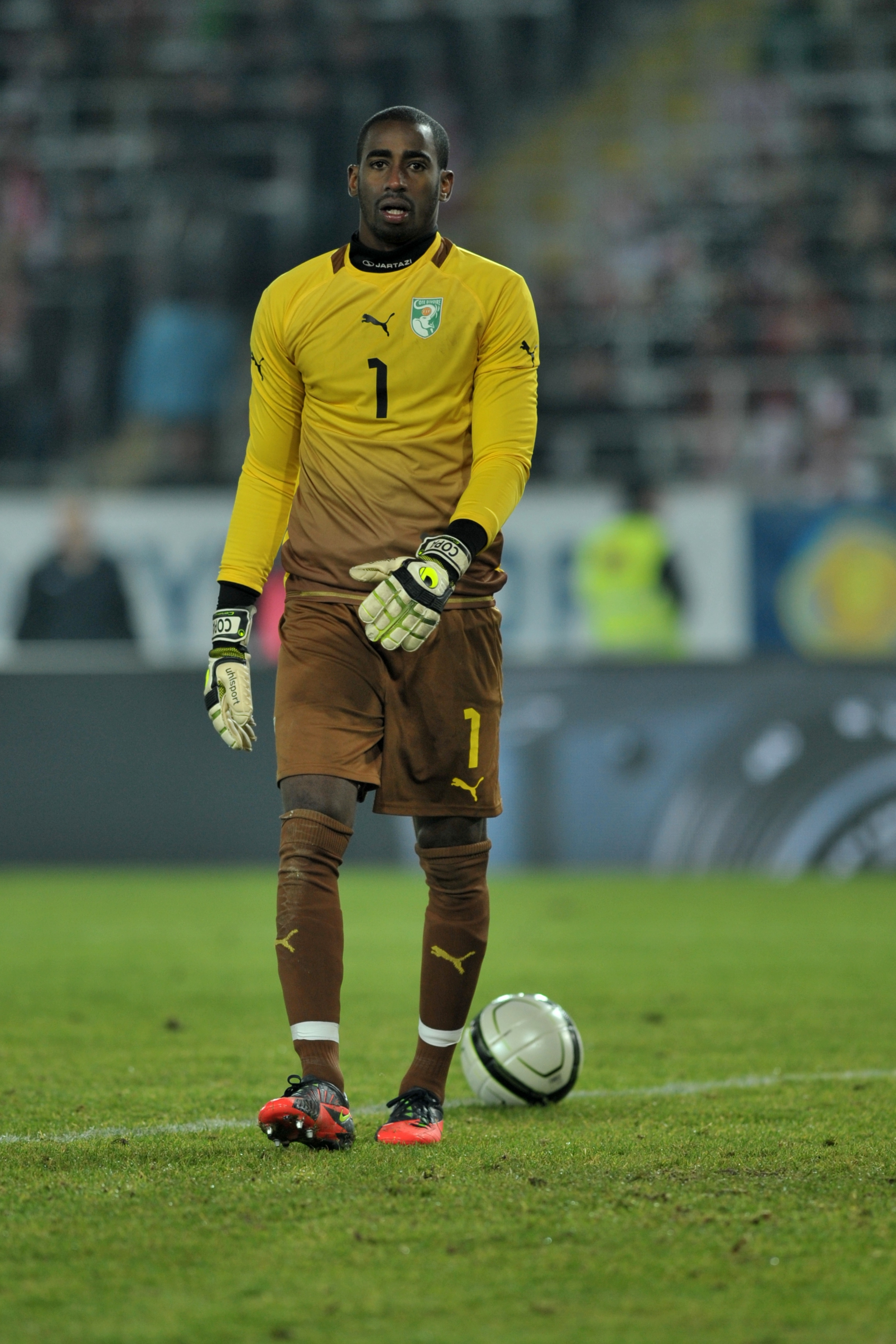
- Barry playing for Ivory Coast in 2012

Personal information
- Full name: Boubacar Barry
- Date of birth: 30 December 1979 (age 46)
- Place of birth: Marcory, Ivory Coast
- Height: 1.81 m (5 ft 11 in)
- Position: Goalkeeper

Senior career*
Years	Team	Apps	(Gls)
1999–2001	ASEC Mimosas	17	(0)
2001–2003	Rennes B	23	(0)
2003–2007	Beveren	107	(0)
2007–2017	Lokeren	239	(1)
2017–2018	OH Leuven	0	(0)
Total		386	(1)

International career
2000–2015	Ivory Coast	82	(0)

Managerial career
- 2018–2019: OH Leuven (goalkeeping coach)
- 2021–2022: Gent U21 (goalkeeping coach)
- 2023–: Lokeren-Temse (goalkeeping coach)
Medal record
Men's football
Representing Ivory Coast
Africa Cup of Nations
Runner-up	2006
Runner-up	2012
Winner	2015
- * Club domestic league appearances and goals

Boubacar "Copa" Barry (born 30 December 1979) is an Ivorian former professional footballer who played as a goalkeeper. Having begun his career at ASEC Mimosas, he moved to France in 2001, where he played for Rennes' reserve team. In 2003, he joined Belgian side Beveren where he stayed four years. He then spent ten years at K.S.C. Lokeren Oost-Vlaanderen amassing 239 league appearances. At international level, he played for the Ivory Coast national team before his retirement from international football in March 2015, but continued to play for his club, Lokeren. Exactly four years after his international retirement, Barry retired also professionally as a player in March 2019.

== Club career ==
Barry scored a penalty for Lokeren in the 2011–12 season, in a 4–0 win against Westerlo. He won the Belgian Cup with Lokeren in the same season as well as in the 2013–14 season.

When his contract at Lokeren ran out, he was signed by Belgian First Division B team Oud-Heverlee Leuven, where he was part of the squad during the 2017–18 and 2018–19 seasons as backup goalkeeper, but was effectively employed as goalkeeping coach.

He retired from playing on 2 March 2019, although at that point in time he had not played a match for over two years.

== International career ==
Barry was called up to the 2006 World Cup as part of the Ivory Coast national team. He appeared in the final group match against Serbia and Montenegro on 22 June 2006, which Ivory Coast won 3–2.

He started all three matches for the Ivory Coast in Group G in the 2010 FIFA World Cup. He earned clean sheets against Portugal and North Korea.

He was the first-choice goalkeeper for the Elephants' 2014 FIFA World Cup campaign as they narrowly missed out on qualifying for the second round, following an injury-time defeat to Greece.

=== 2015 Africa Cup of Nations ===
Barry was called up to the Ivory Coast squad for the 2015 Africa Cup of Nations held in Equatorial Guinea. He was benched for most of the tournament in favour of his younger teammate Sylvain Gbohouo, but went on to play in the final following Gbohouo's injury in the semi-final. It was his second appearance in the showpiece event having been in goal in the 2012 final against Zambia; a match that the Ivory Coast lost 7–8 on penalties after the game finished 0–0. The 2015 final finished goalless after normal and extra-time, and Barry emerged as the hero by saving two penalties and scoring the winning penalty, overcoming a cramp in the process.

A month later, on 2 March 2015, he retired from international football.

== Career statistics ==
=== Club ===
Appearances and goals by club, season and competition
Club	Season	League (Note: Includes Belgian Pro League playoffs.)			Cup		Europe (Note: Includes the Europa League.)		Other (Note: Includes Belgian Super Cup.)		Total	
Club	Season	Division	Apps	Goals	Apps	Goals	Apps	Goals	Apps	Goals	Apps	Goals
Beveren	2003–04	Belgian Pro League	31	0	—		—		—		31	0
Beveren	2004–05	Belgian Pro League	12	0	—		6	0	—		18	0
Beveren	2005–06	Belgian Pro League	27	0	—		—		—		27	0
Beveren	2006–07	Belgian Pro League	32	0	—		—		—		32	0
Beveren	Total		102	0	0	0	6	0	0	0	108	0
Lokeren	2007–08	Belgian Pro League	23	0	—		—		—		23	0
Lokeren	2008–09	Belgian Pro League	31	0	—		—		—		31	0
Lokeren	2009–10	Belgian Pro League	19	0	1	0	—		—		20	0
Lokeren	2010–11	Belgian Pro League	32	0	1	0	—		—		33	0
Lokeren	2011–12	Belgian Pro League	27	1	5	0	—		—		32	1
Lokeren	2012–13	Belgian Pro League	27	0	2	0	3	0	—		32	0
Lokeren	2013–14	Belgian Pro League	31	0	6	0	—		—		37	0
Lokeren	2014–15	Belgian Pro League	16	0	3	0	6	0	—		25	0
Lokeren	2015–16	Belgian Pro League	7	0	0	0	—		—		7	0
Lokeren	2016–17	Belgian Pro League	26	0	2	0	—		—		28	0
Lokeren	Total		239	1	20	0	9	0	0	0	268	1
Career total			341	1	20	0	15	0	0	0	376	1

=== International ===
Appearances and goals by national team and year
National team	Year	Apps	Goals
Ivory Coast	2000	1	0
Ivory Coast	2001	1	0
Ivory Coast	2002	0	0
Ivory Coast	2003	0	0
Ivory Coast	2004	0	0
Ivory Coast	2005	2	0
Ivory Coast	2006	5	0
Ivory Coast	2007	7	0
Ivory Coast	2008	13	0
Ivory Coast	2009	7	0
Ivory Coast	2010	9	0
Ivory Coast	2011	5	0
Ivory Coast	2012	12	0
Ivory Coast	2013	11	0
Ivory Coast	2014	8	0
Ivory Coast	2015	1	0
Total		82	0

== Honours ==
Lokeren

- Belgian Cup: 2011–12, 2013–14

Ivory Coast

- Africa Cup of Nations: 2015

Individual

- Belgian Goalkeeper of the Year: 2008–09
