= 2019 Africa Cup of Nations final =

Football match

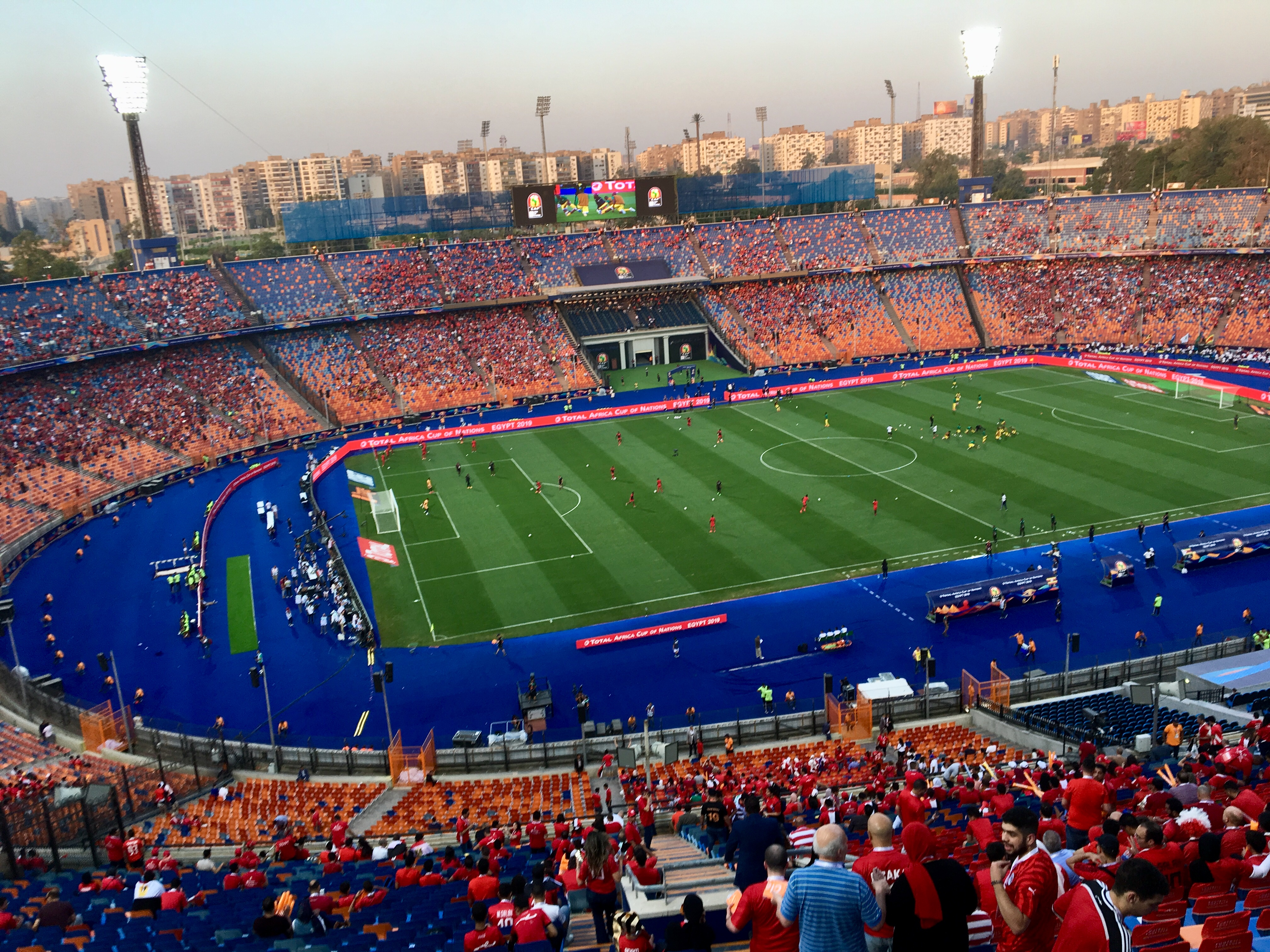
- The Cairo International Stadium hosted the final
- Event: 2019 Africa Cup of Nations
Senegal	Algeria
0	1
- Date: 19 July 2019
- Venue: Cairo International Stadium, Cairo
- Man of the Match: Raïs M'Bolhi (Algeria)
- Referee: Sidi Alioum (Cameroon)
- Attendance: 75,000

The 2019 Africa Cup of Nations final was a football match that determined the winner of the 2019 Africa Cup of Nations. The match was held at the Cairo International Stadium in Cairo, Egypt, on 19 July 2019 and was contested by Senegal and Algeria.

Algeria won the final 1–0 for their second Africa Cup of Nations title, and their first since 1990.

== Background ==
The Africa Cup of Nations, organised by the Confederation of African Football (CAF), is the primary international association football competition for African national teams. The 2019 tournament was the 32nd edition since its inaugural event. While Cameroon was initially slated to host the event, the CAF stripped the country of this privilege in November 2018 due to concerns surrounding the lack of preparation and event security. There was speculation that Morocco would apply to host the event, but it ultimately declined to do so. Egypt and South Africa applied to host the event; the former was chosen in early January 2019.

This was the first time in the history both teams face each other in the final of the Africa Cup of Nations, having previously faced each other in the group stage of the edition three times and in the semi-finals once. Overall record is favorable for Algeria, having won three, draw one and never lost to Senegal in the AFCON history.

Both Senegal and Algeria were grouped in Group C of the 2019 Africa Cup of Nations. Senegal entered the group stage with an easy 2–0 win over Tanzania. However, Senegal suffered a big setback after losing 0–1 defeat to the Algerians when Sadio Mané made his debut in the tournament. Senegal soon bounced back by a 3–0 win over Kenya, thus qualified to the round of sixteen with the Algerians. Senegal managed to beat both Uganda and Benin in the round of sixteen and quarter-finals with the same 1–0 results. Senegal, in the semi-finals against Tunisia, struggled harder due to Tunisia's defensive style of play and almost got led by the Tunisians until Ferjani Sassi missed the penalty; Henri Saivet also failed to convert from the spot after his side got the same opportunity, but the Senegalese got a lucky own goal by Dylan Bronn to finally obtain another 1–0 win after 120' to march to the final for the second time, having done it so in 2002.

Algeria, also shared a similar group with Senegal, began with a 2–0 easy win over Kenya, before they managed to defeat its largest opponent, Senegal, 1–0. The Algerians easily ended the group stage with a 3–0 to Tanzania with three goals in the first 45 minutes. Algeria continued its rampant performance with a 3–0 win over Guinea in the round of sixteen, but struggled harder against Ivory Coast, being held 1–1 after 120' before overcame the Ivorians 4–3 in penalty shootout. The Algerians then put up an outstanding performance, beating African powerhouse Nigeria 2–1, with a late minute goal by Riyad Mahrez in a free kick spot to reach their first ever final since winning at home at 1990.

== Route to the final ==
Senegal
Round
Algeria
Opponents
Result
Group stage
Opponents
Result
Tanzania
2–0
Match 1
Kenya
2–0
Algeria
0–1
Match 2
Senegal
1–0
Kenya
3–0
Match 3
Tanzania
3–0
Group C runners-up

Pos	Team	Pld	Pts
1	Algeria	3	9
2	Senegal	3	6
3	Kenya	3	3
4	Tanzania	3	0

Source: CAF
Final standings
Group C winners

Pos	Team	Pld	Pts
1	Algeria	3	9
2	Senegal	3	6
3	Kenya	3	3
4	Tanzania	3	0

Source: CAF
Opponents
Result
Knockout stage
Opponents
Result
Uganda
1–0
Round of 16
Guinea
3–0
Benin
1–0
Quarter-finals
Ivory Coast
1–1 (a.e.t.) (4–3 p)
Tunisia
1–0 (a.e.t.)
Semi-finals
Nigeria
2–1

== Pre-match ==
=== Officials ===
Although Victor Gomes from South Africa was chosen at first to officiate the final, the CAF decided to change the official referee and replaced Gomes by Sidi Alioum, who officiated the opening match between Egypt and Zimbabwe. CAF staff later admitted they had mistaken the referee to officiate the final, as they planned to call Sidi Alioum but later turned into Victor Gomes. Sidi Alioum himself had officiated in a number of matches, including 2014 FIFA World Cup, as well as a number of CAF Champions League matches.

== Match ==
=== Summary ===
The only goal of the match was scored in the 2nd minute when Baghdad Bounedjah cut in from the left and shot with his right foot from just outside the penalty area with the ball taking a deflection off defender Salif Sané, looping over goalkeeper Alfred Gomis and down into the right corner of the net.

=== Details ===
19 July 2019
21:00

Senegal	0–1	Algeria
	Report	Bounedjah 2'

Cairo International Stadium, Cairo
Attendance: 75,000
Referee: Sidi Alioum (Cameroon)

Senegal	Algeria

GK	23	Alfred Gomis
RB	21	Lamine Gassama	(yellow card) 80'
CB	6	Salif Sané
CB	8	Cheikhou Kouyaté (c)
LB	12	Youssouf Sabaly
CM	5	Idrissa Gueye	(yellow card) 79'
CM	17	Badou Ndiaye		(substituted off) 59'
RW	18	Ismaïla Sarr
AM	14	Henri Saivet		(substituted off) 75'
LW	10	Sadio Mané
CF	9	M'Baye Niang		(substituted off) 85'
Substitutions:
FW	15	Krépin Diatta		(substituted on) 59'
FW	19	Mbaye Diagne		(substituted on) 75'
FW	11	Keita Baldé		(substituted on) 85'
Manager:
Aliou Cissé

GK	23	Raïs M'Bolhi
CB	2	Aïssa Mandi	(yellow card) 90+2'
CB	4	Djamel Benlamri
CB	21	Ramy Bensebaini	(yellow card) 33'
RM	18	Mehdi Zeffane
CM	17	Adlène Guedioura	(yellow card) 90+4'
CM	22	Ismaël Bennacer
LM	8	Youcef Belaïli	(yellow card) 54'	(substituted off) 84'
RF	7	Riyad Mahrez (c)
CF	9	Baghdad Bounedjah		(substituted off) 89'
LF	10	Sofiane Feghouli		(substituted off) 85'
Substitutions:
MF	11	Yacine Brahimi		(substituted on) 84'
DF	3	Mehdi Tahrat		(substituted on) 85'
FW	13	Islam Slimani		(substituted on) 89'
Manager:
Djamel Belmadi

Man of the Match:
Rais M'Bolhi (Algeria)

Assistant referees:
Evarist Menkouande (Cameroon)
Nguegoue Elvis Guy Noupue (Cameroon)
Fourth official:
Eric Otogo-Castane (Gabon)
Reserve assistant referee:
Waleed Ahmed Ali (Sudan)
Video assistant referee:
Benoît Millot (France)
Assistant video assistant referees:
Bakary Gassama (Gambia)
Zakhele Thusi Siwela (South Africa)

Match rules

- 90 minutes.
- 30 minutes of extra time if necessary.
- Penalty shoot-out if scores still level.
- Maximum of twelve named substitutes.
- Maximum of three substitutions, with a fourth allowed in extra time.

== See also ==
- 2019 Africa Cup of Nations knockout stage
