= Larry Horaeb =

Namibian footballer

Personal information
- Date of birth: 12 November 1991 (age 35)
- Place of birth: Tsumkwe, Namibia
- Height: 1.70 m (5 ft 7 in)
- Position: Right back

Senior career*
Years	Team	Apps	(Gls)
2009–2010	SK Windhoek		
2010–2013	Ramblers		
2013–2015	AmaZulu	9	(0)

International career^{‡}
2011–	Namibia	29	(0)
- * Club domestic league appearances and goals as of 19:22, 6 June 2017 (UTC) ‡ National team caps and goals as of 19:22, 6 June 2017 (UTC)

Larry Horaeb (born 12 November 1991) is a Namibian international footballer who plays as a right back.

== Career ==
Horaeb has played for SK Windhoek, Ramblers and AmaZulu.

He made his international debut for Namibia in 2011.
