= Idrissa Gueye =

Senegalese footballer (born 1989)

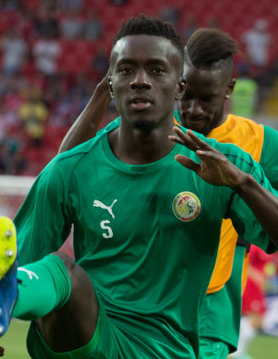
- Gueye with Senegal in 2018

Personal information
- Full name: Idrissa Gana Gueye
- Date of birth: 26 September 1989 (age 37)
- Place of birth: Dakar, Senegal
- Height: 1.74 m (5 ft 9 in)
- Position: Defensive midfielder

Team information
- Current team: Al-Diriyah
- Number: 5

Youth career
- Diambars

Senior career*
| Years | Team | Apps | (Gls) |
| 2007–2008 | Diambars | | |
| 2008–2010 | Lille B | 55 | (2) |
| 2010–2015 | Lille | 134 | (5) |
| 2015–2016 | Aston Villa | 35 | (0) |
| 2016–2019 | Everton | 99 | (3) |
| 2019–2022 | Paris Saint-Germain | 74 | (6) |
| 2022–2026 | Everton | 120 | (6) |
| 2026– | Al-Diriyah | 10 | (1) |

International career^{‡}
| 2012 | Senegal Olympic | 1 | (0) |
| 2011– | Senegal | 143 | (7) |
Medal record
Men's football
Representing Senegal
Africa Cup of Nations
| Winner | 2021 Cameroon |
| Runner-up | 2019 Egypt |
| Runner-up | 2025 Morocco |
- * Club domestic league appearances and goals as of 17:53, 30 October 2026 (UTC) ‡ National team caps and goals as of 23:07, 4 October 2026 (UTC)

Idrissa Gana Gueye (born 26 September 1989) is a Senegalese professional footballer who plays as a defensive midfielder for Saudi Pro League club Al-Diriyah and the Senegal national team.

Starting his career at Diambars in his native Senegal, Gueye joined French club Lille's reserve side in 2008. He would go on to play for the side's first team from 2010 to 2015, winning a Ligue 1 and Coupe de France double in 2011, before moving to England with Aston Villa. A year later, he signed for fellow Premier League club Everton. In 2019, Gueye returned to France by signing for the reigning Ligue 1 champions, Paris Saint-Germain (PSG). He reached the 2020 UEFA Champions League final with the club, but did not play in the match in which PSG lost. In 2022, he returned to Everton.

Gueye made his debut for Senegal in 2011. He was part of the Senegalese squad at the 2012 Summer Olympics, where he played one match. He played for Senegal at three FIFA World Cup and six Africa Cup of Nations tournaments. After a defeat in the 2019 AFCON final, he helped his country win the following competition's final in 2022. He is Senegal's record cap holder and the first Senegalese player to reach over 100 caps.

== Club career ==
=== Early career ===
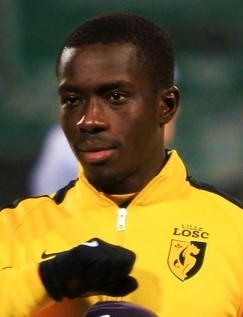
Gueye lining up for Lille in 2014

Born in Dakar, Gueye spent his early career in Senegal at Diambars, a football academy set up by Patrick Vieira and Bernard Lama. He joined French club Lille in August 2008. He broke through into the first team in the 2010–11 season, playing 11 games as the team won Ligue 1, and started in the 2011 Coupe de France Final win over Paris Saint-Germain. He became a regular starter in the league and the UEFA Champions League over the following four seasons. His first goal came on 17 February 2011 in a 2–2 home draw with PSV Eindhoven in the UEFA Europa League last 32 first leg, while his first league goal came on 5 October 2013 in a 3–0 win over Ajaccio at the Stade Pierre-Mauroy. He was sent off on 21 April 2012 in a 2–0 win at Dijon.

=== Aston Villa ===
On 10 July 2015, Gueye joined English Premier League club Aston Villa for a £9 million transfer fee. On 8 August, he made his debut in a 1–0 away victory over AFC Bournemouth. On 19 January 2016, Gueye scored his first and only goal for Villa in a 2–0 over Wycombe Wanderers in the third round replay of the FA Cup. In total, Gueye made 35 league appearances for Villa as the club was relegated from the Premier League at the end of the season.

=== Everton ===
On 2 August 2016 and with Aston Villa relegated from the Premier League, Everton triggered a release clause in Gueye's contract, reported to be £7.1 million, and signed him to a four-year contract. He made the highest number of successful tackles and interceptions per match across Europe's top five leagues over the 2016 calendar year. Gueye scored his first league goal for Everton in a 2–0 victory over Sunderland at Goodison Park on 25 February 2017. He became the first player in Europe's top five leagues to win 100 tackles in the 2016–17 season.

Gueye scored his first goal for Everton in European competition on 17 August 2017 in the UEFA Europa League play-off round first leg against Hajduk Split. He was sent off on 22 October in a 5–2 home loss to Arsenal. In February 2018, he extended his contract with Everton until 2022.

In January 2019, Everton rejected an offer from French club Paris Saint-Germain (PSG) for Gueye. However, the speculation regarding PSG did not negatively impact his performances as Gueye was awarded the club's joint Player's Player of the Year for the 2018–19 season along with Lucas Digne.

=== Paris Saint-Germain ===
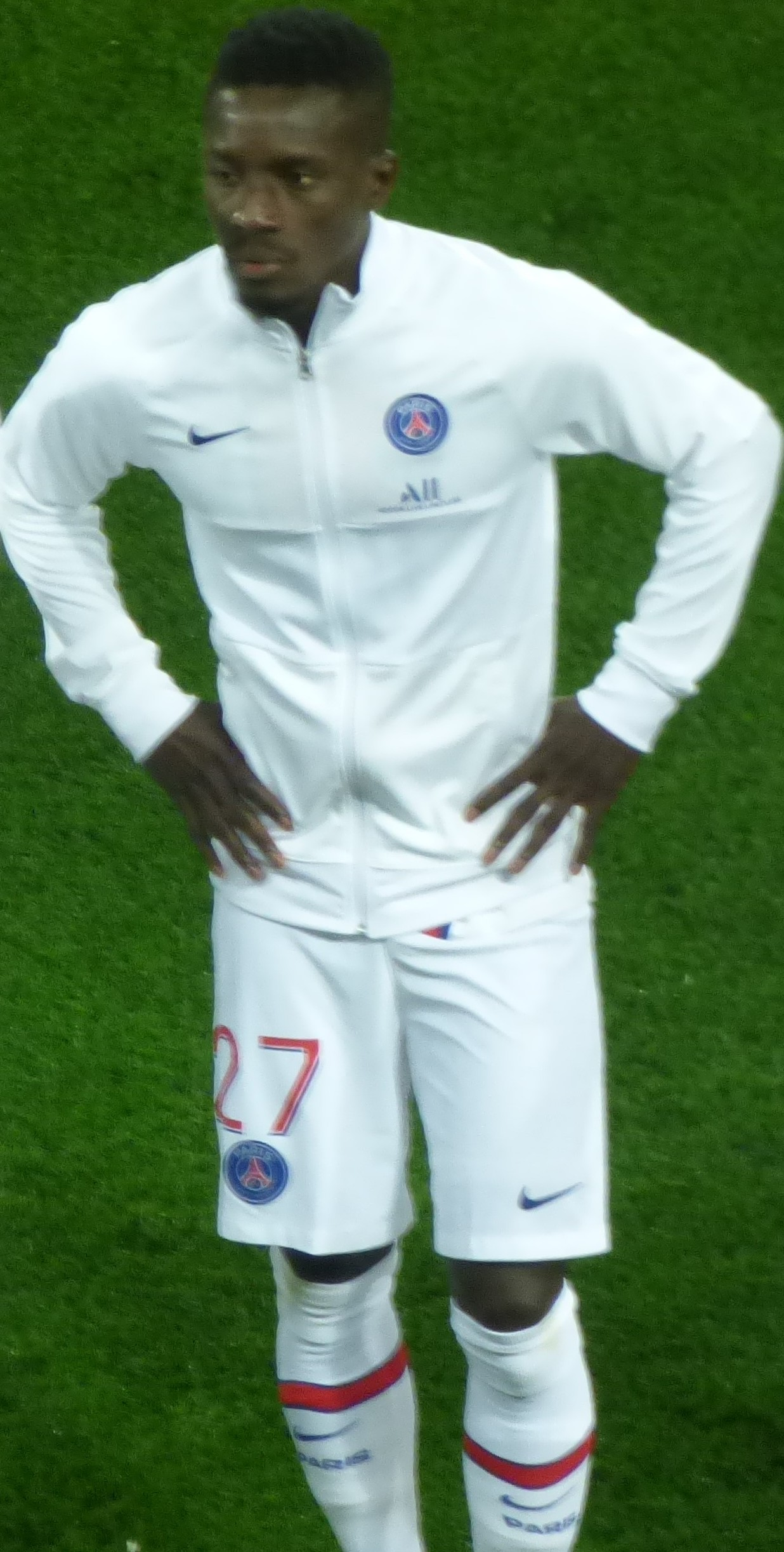
Gueye lining up for Paris Saint-Germain in 2020

On 30 July 2019, Gueye signed for Ligue 1 club PSG for a fee of £30 million. He made his debut on 25 August in a 4–0 victory over Toulouse. On 18 September, he produced a "brilliant" display in a 3–0 win over Real Madrid in the UEFA Champions League. His first goal for PSG came in a 4–0 win against Angers on 5 October. In his first season in Paris, Gueye won a domestic treble and finished runner-up in the Champions League, sitting on the bench for the loss to Bayern Munich in the final. In his second season, the club won the Coupe de France and made the semi-finals of the Champions League, losing to Manchester City.

After having been suspended for two Champions League matches due to a red card in the first leg of the semi-final against Manchester City in April 2021, Gueye made his return to European football in a 2–0 win over the same opponent on 28 September 2021. He scored the opening goal of the match, his first goal in the Champions League, and was given the Player of the Match award.

=== Return to Everton ===
Gueye began talks to return to Everton in early August 2022. He signed a two-year contract with the club on 1 September 2022 for a reported fee of £2 million.

On 19 December 2023, Gueye missed a penalty for Everton in their 2023–24 EFL Cup quarter-final defeat against Fulham. Gueye and Amadou Onana, who also missed a penalty for Everton, were defended by manager Sean Dyche. In the 2024–25 season, he recorded the most tackles in the Premier League, with 133.

On 24 November 2025, Gueye was sent off in a match against Manchester United after slapping teammate Michael Keane during an argument. His appeal was rejected, although no reason was given for that decision. On 24 July 2026, Everton announced Gueye's departure from the club.

=== Al-Diriyah ===
On 9 August 2026, Gueye joined Saudi Pro League club Al-Diriyah as a free agent on a one-year contract.

== International career ==
Gueye made his international debut for Senegal on 11 November 2011 as a half-time substitute for Deme N'Diaye in a 4–1 friendly win away to neighbours Guinea. He was part of the team at the 2012 Olympics, but was injured just before the interval in the opening game against hosts Great Britain. He was selected for the Africa Cup of Nations in 2015, and 2017.

On 9 June 2017, Gueye scored his first international goal to conclude a 3–0 win over Equatorial Guinea in 2019 Africa Cup of Nations qualification.

He was named in Senegal's 23-man squad for the 2018 World Cup in Russia, starting in all three of the team's matches. In Senegal's opening match of the tournament, Gueye registered an assist as his 37th-minute shot deflected in off Poland's Thiago Cionek to give the Africans a 1-0 lead.

At the 2019 African finals in Egypt, he scored the only goal of the quarter-final win over Benin for the finalists. Senegal won the 2021 Africa Cup of Nations in Cameroon, with Gueye scoring in a 3–1 semi-final win over Burkina Faso.

On 11 November 2022, he was named in the 26-man squad for the 2022 FIFA World Cup in Qatar. On 29 November, Senegal qualified for the knockout phase after a 2–1 win over Ecuador in the last group stage match, but Gueye received his second booking in the tournament to be ruled out of the round of 16.

On 24 March 2023, Gueye played his 100th international match in a 5–1 win over Mozambique during the Africa Cup of Nations qualification, to be the first Senegalese to achieve this feat.

In December 2023, he was named in Senegal's squad for the postponed 2023 Africa Cup of Nations, to be held in the Ivory Coast in January 2024. He appeared as a substitute in three of the team's four matches, including the penalty shootout loss to hosts Côte d'Ivoire in the round of 16.

After appearing in all but one of Senegal's six 2026 FIFA World Cup qualifying matches, Gueye was named in Senegal's squad for the 2025 Africa Cup of Nations. He was an ever-present for Senegal at the tournament and was named in the Best XI of the tournament by CAF. On 18 January 2026, he captained Senegal to their second AFCON title, beating host nation Morocco 1–0 after extra time.

== Style of play ==
An energetic midfielder, known for his ball-winning skills, as well as his ability to press opponents and intercept passes, Gueye completed the most tackles during the 2016–17 Premier League season.

== Personal life ==
Gueye is married to Pauline, with whom he has two sons. He is a practising Muslim and has made the Hajj pilgrimage to Mecca. In May 2022, he held a charity dinner to raise €2 million in funds for African children affected by cancer and HIV/AIDS.

He was appointed a Grand Officer of the National Order of the Lion by President of Senegal Macky Sall following the nation's victory at the 2021 Africa Cup of Nations.

== Controversy ==
In the 37th matchday of the 2021–22 Ligue 1 season, Gueye travelled with the PSG squad for the away match against Montpellier. However, he was not included in the team sheet for what manager Mauricio Pochettino revealed to be "personal reasons", and not an injury. This brought the media spotlight on Gueye; RMC Sport reported that he had refused to play in the match due to PSG's shirts featuring the rainbow flag in support of the LGBT movement, an initiative taken by Ligue 1 for the occasion of the International Day Against Homophobia, Transphobia and Biphobia. He had also notably missed the same fixture in the previous season, with the reasoning behind his non-participation then being that he was suffering from gastroenteritis.

For his controversial absence against Montpellier, Gueye received backlash and calls for sanctions from Rouge Direct, an organisation against homophobia, and Île-de-France regional president Valérie Pécresse, among others. The French Football Federation (FFF) asked him to confirm the reason for his absence, to dispel rumours.

Senegalese president Macky Sall expressed his support for Gueye, justifying the position by stating that Gueye's "religious beliefs must be respected". Gueye's Senegal teammates Cheikhou Kouyaté, Ismaïla Sarr, and Nampalys Mendy, who all play in England, also praised him for his actions. The hashtag #WeAreAllIdrissa, in support of Gueye, started trending over social media.

== Career statistics ==
=== Club ===
As of match played 30 October 2026

Appearances and goals by club, season and competition
| Club | Season | League | | | National cup (Note: Includes Coupe de France, FA Cup) | | League cup (Note: Includes Coupe de la Ligue, EFL Cup) | | Continental | | Other | | Total | |
| Club | Season | Division | Apps | Goals | Apps | Goals | Apps | Goals | Apps | Goals | Apps | Goals | Apps | Goals |
|---|---|---|---|---|---|---|---|---|---|---|---|---|---|---|
| Lille B | 2008–09 | CFA | 24 | 1 | — | | — | | — | | — | | 24 | 1 |
| Lille B | 2009–10 | CFA | 24 | 1 | — | | — | | — | | — | | 24 | 1 |
| Lille B | 2010–11 | CFA | 7 | 0 | — | | — | | — | | — | | 7 | 0 |
| Lille B | Total | | 55 | 2 | 0 | 0 | 0 | 0 | 0 | 0 | 0 | 0 | 55 | 2 |
| Lille | 2009–10 | Ligue 1 | 0 | 0 | 1 | 0 | 0 | 0 | 0 | 0 | — | | 1 | 0 |
| Lille | 2010–11 | Ligue 1 | 11 | 0 | 1 | 0 | 0 | 0 | 6 (Note: Appearances in UEFA Europa League) | 1 | — | | 18 | 1 |
| Lille | 2011–12 | Ligue 1 | 25 | 0 | 3 | 0 | 2 | 0 | 3 (Note: Appearances in UEFA Champions League) | 0 | 1 (Note: Appearance in Trophée des Champions) | 0 | 34 | 0 |
| Lille | 2012–13 | Ligue 1 | 29 | 0 | 2 | 0 | 2 | 0 | 5 | 0 | — | | 38 | 0 |
| Lille | 2013–14 | Ligue 1 | 37 | 1 | 3 | 0 | 1 | 0 | — | | — | | 41 | 1 |
| Lille | 2014–15 | Ligue 1 | 32 | 4 | 2 | 0 | 0 | 0 | 10 (Note: Four appearances in UEFA Champions League, six appearances in UEFA Europa League) | 0 | — | | 44 | 4 |
| Lille | Total | | 134 | 5 | 12 | 0 | 5 | 0 | 24 | 1 | 1 | 0 | 176 | 6 |
| Aston Villa | 2015–16 | Premier League | 35 | 0 | 3 | 1 | 0 | 0 | — | | — | | 38 | 1 |
| Everton | 2016–17 | Premier League | 33 | 1 | 0 | 0 | 2 | 0 | — | | — | | 35 | 1 |
| Everton | 2017–18 | Premier League | 33 | 2 | 0 | 0 | 0 | 0 | 5 | 1 | — | | 38 | 3 |
| Everton | 2018–19 | Premier League | 33 | 0 | 2 | 0 | 0 | 0 | — | | — | | 35 | 0 |
| Everton | Total | | 99 | 3 | 2 | 0 | 2 | 0 | 5 | 1 | 0 | 0 | 108 | 4 |
| Paris Saint-Germain | 2019–20 | Ligue 1 | 20 | 1 | 5 | 0 | 2 | 0 | 7 | 0 | 0 | 0 | 34 | 1 |
| Paris Saint-Germain | 2020–21 | Ligue 1 | 28 | 2 | 6 | 0 | — | | 10 | 0 | 0 | 0 | 44 | 2 |
| Paris Saint-Germain | 2021–22 | Ligue 1 | 26 | 3 | 0 | 0 | — | | 7 | 1 | 0 | 0 | 33 | 4 |
| Paris Saint-Germain | Total | | 74 | 6 | 11 | 0 | 2 | 0 | 24 | 1 | 0 | 0 | 111 | 7 |
| Everton | 2022–23 | Premier League | 33 | 0 | 1 | 0 | 0 | 0 | — | | — | | 34 | 0 |
| Everton | 2023–24 | Premier League | 25 | 4 | 0 | 0 | 4 | 0 | — | | — | | 29 | 4 |
| Everton | 2024–25 | Premier League | 37 | 0 | 2 | 0 | 1 | 0 | — | | — | | 40 | 0 |
| Everton | 2025–26 | Premier League | 25 | 2 | 0 | 0 | 0 | 0 | — | | — | | 25 | 2 |
| Everton | Total | | 120 | 6 | 3 | 0 | 5 | 0 | 0 | 0 | 0 | 0 | 128 | 6 |
| Al-Diriyah | 2026–27 | Saudi Pro League | 10 | 1 | 0 | 0 | — | | — | | — | | 10 | 1 |
| Career total | | | 526 | 23 | 31 | 1 | 14 | 0 | 53 | 3 | 1 | 0 | 625 | 27 |

=== International ===
As of match played 4 October 2026

Appearances and goals by national team and year
| National team | Year | Apps | Goals |
|---|---|---|---|
| Senegal | 2011 | 1 | 0 |
| Senegal | 2012 | 6 | 0 |
| Senegal | 2013 | 8 | 0 |
| Senegal | 2014 | 7 | 0 |
| Senegal | 2015 | 11 | 0 |
| Senegal | 2016 | 7 | 0 |
| Senegal | 2017 | 14 | 1 |
| Senegal | 2018 | 8 | 1 |
| Senegal | 2019 | 11 | 2 |
| Senegal | 2020 | 1 | 0 |
| Senegal | 2021 | 10 | 2 |
| Senegal | 2022 | 15 | 1 |
| Senegal | 2023 | 7 | 0 |
| Senegal | 2024 | 12 | 0 |
| Senegal | 2025 | 11 | 0 |
| Senegal | 2026 | 14 | 0 |
| Total | | 143 | 7 |

Scores and results list Senegal's goal tally first.

List of international goals scored by Idrissa Gueye
| No. | Date | Venue | Opponent | Score | Result | Competition |
|---|---|---|---|---|---|---|
| 1 | 10 June 2017 | Stade Léopold Sédar Senghor, Dakar, Senegal | Equatorial Guinea | 3–0 | 3–0 | 2019 Africa Cup of Nations qualification |
| 2 | 13 October 2018 | Stade Léopold Sédar Senghor, Dakar, Senegal | Sudan | 2–0 | 3–0 | 2019 Africa Cup of Nations qualification |
| 3 | 16 June 2019 | Ismailia Stadium, Ismailia, Egypt | Nigeria | 1–0 | 1–0 | Friendly |
| 4 | 10 July 2019 | 30 June Stadium, Cairo, Egypt | Benin | 1–0 | 1–0 | 2019 Africa Cup of Nations |
| 5 | 8 June 2021 | Stade Lat-Dior, Thiès, Senegal | Cape Verde | 1–0 | 2–0 | Friendly |
| 6 | 9 October 2021 | Stade Lat-Dior, Thiès, Senegal | Namibia | 1–0 | 4–1 | 2022 FIFA World Cup qualification |
| 7 | 2 February 2022 | Ahmadou Ahidjo Stadium, Yaoundé, Cameroon | Burkina Faso | 2–0 | 3–1 | 2021 Africa Cup of Nations |

== Honours ==
Lille

- Ligue 1: 2010–11
- Coupe de France: 2010–11

Paris Saint-Germain

- Ligue 1: 2019–20, 2021–22
- Coupe de France: 2019–20, 2020–21
- Coupe de la Ligue: 2019–20
- Trophée des Champions: 2022
- UEFA Champions League runner-up: 2019–20

Senegal

- Africa Cup of Nations: 2021; runner-up: 2019, 2025

Individual

- Everton Player of the Season: 2024–25
- Everton Players' Player of the Season: 2018–19 2024–25
- Africa Cup of Nations Team of the Tournament: 2019, 2025
- CAF Team of the Year: 2019
- IFFHS CAF Men Team of The Year: 2020

Orders

- Grand Officer of the National Order of the Lion: 2022

== See also ==
- List of men's footballers with 100 or more international caps
