= Denzil Haoseb =

Namibian footballer

Personal information
- Date of birth: 25 February 1991 (age 35)
- Place of birth: Gobabis, Namibia
- Height: 1.81 m (5 ft 11 1/2 in)
- Position: Centre-back

Team information
- Current team: Khomas NamPol SC

Senior career*
Years	Team	Apps	(Gls)
2010–2016	Black Africa		
2016–2018	Jomo Cosmos	55	(3)
2018–2019	Highlands Park	22	(0)

International career^{‡}
2011–	Namibia	82	(0)
- * Club domestic league appearances and goals as of 20:51, 9 May 2020 (UTC) ‡ National team caps and goals as of 20:51, 20 June 2023 (UTC)

Denzil Haoseb is a Namibian professional footballer who plays as a centre-back for Namibia Premier League club Orlando Pirates and the Namibia national team.

== International career ==
Haoseb made his debut for the senior Namibia national football team in a friendly against Botswana in Maun on 16 March 2011. He was part of the Namibia squad for the 2019 Africa Cup of Nations.
