= Riaan Hanamub =

Namibian footballer

Personal information
- Full name: Nelvin Riaan Hanamub
- Date of birth: 8 February 1995 (age 31)
- Place of birth: Otavi, Namibia
- Height: 1.70 m (5 ft 7 in)
- Position: Defender

Team information
- Current team: AmaZulu
- Number: 4

Senior career*
Years	Team	Apps	(Gls)
2013–2015	Touch & Go Otavi		
2015–2018	Orlando Pirates (Namibia)		
2018–2020	Jomo Cosmos	35	(1)
2020–2022	Chippa United	64	(2)
2022–	AmaZulu	94	(2)

International career^{‡}
2016–	Namibia	34	(0)
- * Club domestic league appearances and goals as of 4 January 2026 ‡ National team caps and goals as of 17:45, 19 November 2024 (UTC)

Nelvin Riaan Hanamub (born 8 February 1995) is a Namibian professional footballer who plays as a defender for South African Premier Division club AmaZulu and the Namibia national team.

== Career statistics ==
=== Club ===
As of 11 February 2020.

Club	Season	League			National Cup		League Cup		Other		Total	
Club	Season	Division	Apps	Goals	Apps	Goals	Apps	Goals	Apps	Goals	Apps	Goals
Jomo Cosmos	2018–19	National First Division	22	1	2	0	0	0	0	0	24	1
Jomo Cosmos	2019–20	National First Division	10	0	1	0	0	0	0	0	11	0
Total			32	1	3	0	0	0	0	0	35	1

=== International ===
As of matches played 19 November 2024.

National team	Year	Apps	Goals
Namibia	2016	1	0
Namibia	2017	8	0
Namibia	2018	9	0
Namibia	2019	7	0
Namibia	2020	2	0
Namibia	2021	5	0
Namibia	2022	1	0
Namibia	2023	6	0
Namibia	2024	12	0
Total		51	0
