= Ricardo Mannetti =

Namibian footballer

Personal information
- Full name: Ricardo Giovanni Mannetti
- Date of birth: 24 April 1975 (age 51)
- Place of birth: Windhoek, South West Africa
- Height: 1.70 m (5 ft 7 in)
- Position: Midfielder

Senior career*
| Years | Team | Apps | (Gls) |
| 1995–1997 | Civics | | |
| 1997–2005 | Santos | | |
| 2000–2001 | → Avendale Athletico (loan) | 12 | (0) |
| 2005–2006 | Umtata Bush Bucks | | |
| 2006–2007 | Western Province United | | |

International career
| 1992–2003 | Namibia | 63 | (1) |

Managerial career
- 2007–2010: Civics
- 2010: Black Africa
- 2011–2013: Namibia U20
- 2013–2015: Namibia
- 2015–2019: Namibia
- 2022–2023: African Stars (dir. football)
Medal record
Men's football
Representing Namibia (as player)
COSAFA Cup
| Runner-up | 1997 Southern Africa |
| Runner-up | 1999 Southern Africa |
Representing Namibia (as manager)
COSAFA Cup
| Winner | 2015 South Africa |
- * Club domestic league appearances and goals

Ricardo Mannetti (born 24 April 1975) is a Namibian retired footballer who now works as a coach. He has managed and coached the Namibia national team.

== Playing career club ==
Nicknamed Bucksy, Mannetti grew up in Windhoek's Bethlehem township and played as a midfielder in South Africa for Santos and became the first Namibian to win the South African Professional Soccer League in 2001.

=== International ===
He competed for the Namibia national football team from 1992–2003, including the 1998 African Cup of Nations. He made his debut for the Brave Warriors in an October 1992 World Cup qualification match against Zambia and totaled 1 goal in 63 games for them.

== Managerial career ==
Before he resigned in June 2015, he competed in the COSAFA Cup and led the Namibian National team to their first international Trophy victory. He was re-appointed coach in September 2015 after patching things up with the Namibia Football Association. Mannetti has led the Namibian national team, Brave Warriors to their first-ever 2015 COSAFA Cup triumph in South Africa. He helped Namibia reach the quarter-finals of the 2018 CHAN Games in Cameroon and led the team to the 2019 AFCON in Egypt.

He was director of football for one season at African Stars.

== Career statistics ==
=== International ===
Scores and results list Namibia's goal tally first, score column indicates score after each Mannetti goal.

List of international goals scored by Ricardo Mannetti
| No. | Date | Venue | Opponent | Score | Result | Competition |
|---|---|---|---|---|---|---|
| 1 | 12 February 1998 | Stade Général Aboubacar Sangoulé Lamizana, Bobo-Dioulasso, Burkina Faso | Ivory Coast | 2–3 | 3–4 | 1998 Africa Cup of Nations |

== Honours ==
=== Player ===
Namibia

- COSAFA Cup: Runner-up, 1997, 1999

=== Manager ===
Namibia

- COSAFA Cup: 2015
