= Al Salam Stadium (Egypt) =

Multi-use sports stadium in Cairo, Egypt

Al Ahly WE Al Salam Stadium
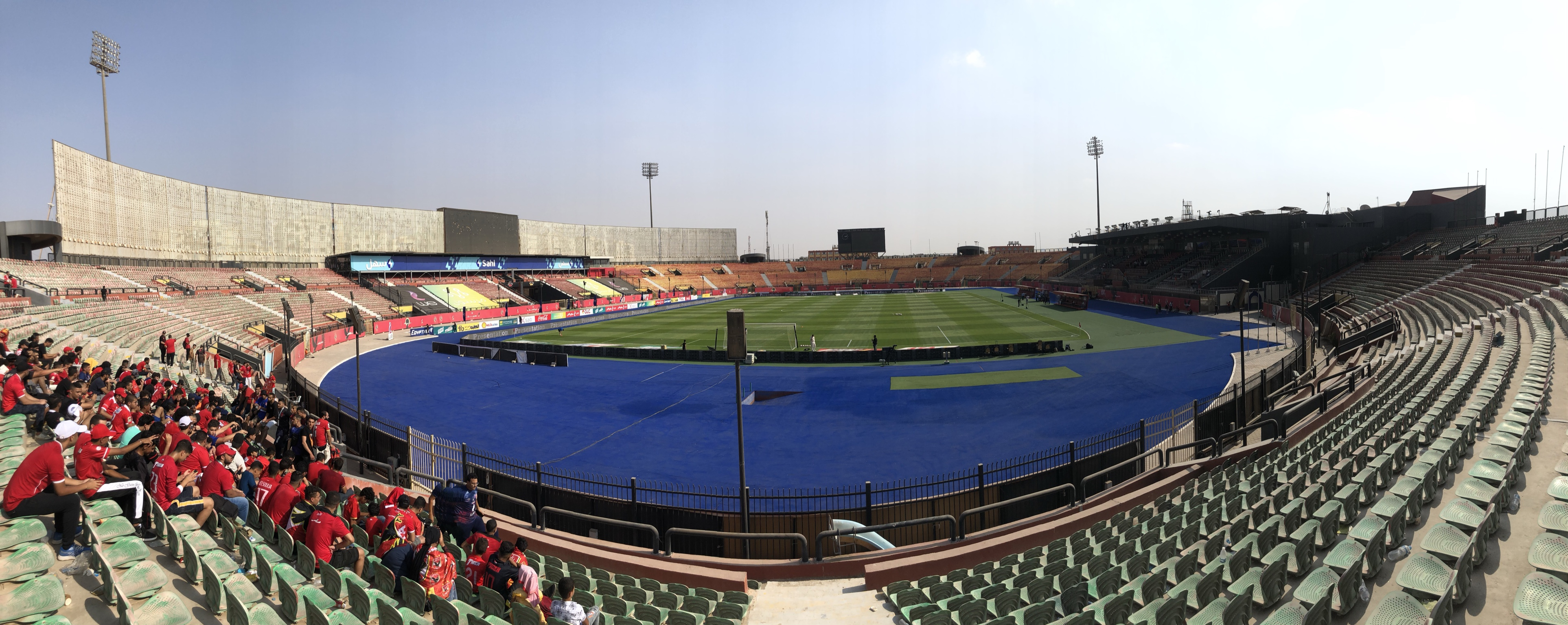
- Al Ahly WE Stadium (August 2022)
- Interactive map of Al Ahly WE Al Salam Stadium
- Former names: Al Salam Stadium (2009-2020)
- Location: Al Salam City, Cairo
- Coordinates: 30.1745°N 31.435°E
- Capacity: 30,000
- Surface: Grass
- Field size: 105 metres (115 yd) by 68 metres (74 yd)

Construction
- Opened: 2009
- Renovated: 2019

Tenants
- El-Entag El-Harby (EPL; Modern Sport FC

Al-Salam Stadium (Arabic: ستاد السلام) is a multi-use stadium used mostly for association football matches with an all-seated capacity of 30,000. The stadium is the home venue of Egyptian Premier League side El Entag El Harby. The stadium was built in 2009 and hosted Group B during the 2009 FIFA U-20 World Cup, and also hosted matches in the 2019 Africa Cup of Nations.

== Takeover by Al Ahly 2019–2022 ==
On 4 December 2019, Al Ahly announced that they acquired the stadium from the Egyptian Ministry of Military Production for 25 years until 2045 as part of the club's "2045 vision", with an option to return the stadium if Al Ahly's new proposed stadium is built. As a result, it was reported that the stadium's official name was officially changed from Al Salam Stadium to Al Ahly WE Al Salam Stadium on 12 August 2020. However, El Entag El Harby president Ashraf Amer announced only one day later that stadium's name will not change from Al Salam Stadium according to the agreement reached between Al Ahly, the Egyptian Ministry of Military Production, and Estadat.

Despite acquiring the stadium, Al Ahly confirmed that El Entag El Harby, a club owned by the Egyptian Ministry of Military Production that used to play their home matches there, would be allowed to play at the stadium normally until the end of the 2019–20 season to avoid any possible problems or conflicts in the league's schedule, with the option to extend it for further seasons. Al Ahly also confirmed that all national teams would be allowed to play on the venue. Al-Ahly topped all African clubs with the largest social media following, with 33 million followers across all social media platforms as of 12 October 2022.

== 2019 Africa Cup of Nations ==
The stadium was one of the venues for the 2019 Africa Cup of Nations.

The following games were played at the stadium during the 2019 Africa Cup of Nations:

Date	Time (CEST)	Team #1	Result	Team #2	Round	Attendance
23 June 2019	16:30	Morocco	1–0	Namibia	Group D	6,857
24 June 2019	16:30	Ivory Coast	1–0	South Africa	Group D	4,961
28 June 2019	19:00	Morocco	1–0	Ivory Coast	Group D	27,500
28 June 2019	22:00	South Africa	1–0	Namibia	Group D	16,090
30 June 2019	18:00	Burundi	0–2	Guinea	Group B	5,753
1 July 2019	18:00	South Africa	0–1	Morocco	Group D	12,098
1 July 2019	21:00	Tanzania	0–3	Algeria	Group C	8,921
5 July 2019	18:00	Morocco	1–1 (1–4 pen.)	Benin	Round of 16	7,500
11 July 2019	21:00	Madagascar	0–3	Tunisia	Quarter-finals	7,568
17 July 2019	21:00	Tunisia	0–1	Nigeria	Third place play-off	6,340

== Gallery ==
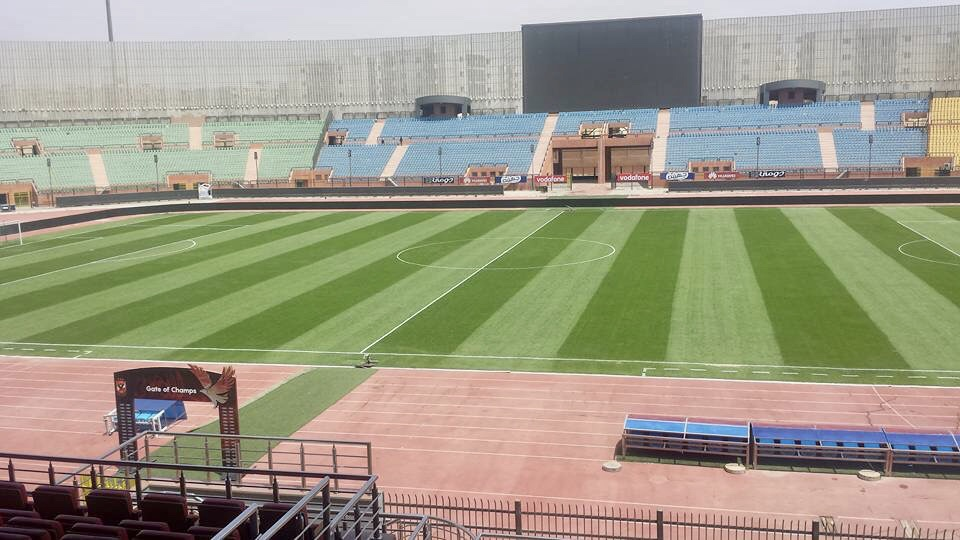

== See also ==
- List of football stadiums in Egypt
- Lists of stadiums
