= Sidi Alioum =

Cameroonian football referee

- Born: 17 July 1982 (age 44); Maroua, Cameroon

Domestic
Years	League	Role

International
Years	League	Role
2008–	FIFA listed	Referee

Sidi Alioum (born 17 July 1982) is a Cameroonian football referee. He has officiated at five editions of the Africa Cup of Nations and was the referee for the 2019 final. Alioum has also officiated at two editions of the FIFA Club World Cup, two FIFA U-20 World Cups, and the 2011 FIFA U-17 World Cup.
