= Ibrahim Kamara =

Ivorian football manager (born 1966)

Personal information
- Date of birth: 17 May 1966 (age 60)
- Place of birth: Ivory Coast

Managerial career
- Years: Team
- 2013–2014: Ivory Coast (U-17)
- 2014–2018: Ivory Coast (U-20)
- 2015: Ivory Coast (U-23)
- 2018: Ivory Coast (CHAN)
- 2018–2020: Ivory Coast

Ibrahim Kamara (born 17 May 1966) is an Ivorian football manager.

== Career ==
Kamara coached the U17 national team at the 2013 FIFA U-17 World Cup.

Kamara coached the Ivory Coast "CHAN" team at the 2018 African Nations Championship tournament. Ivory Coast finished bottom of Group B with 1 point.

In July 2018, he was appointed coach of the Ivory Coast national football team.

In February 2020, he exited the Ivory Coast National Football team as the head coach.
