= Sylvain Gbohouo =

Ivorian footballer (born 1988)

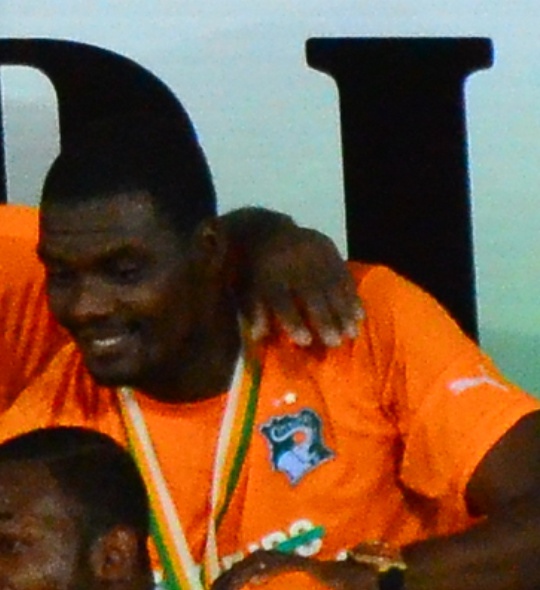
- Gbohouo with the Ivory Coast in 2015

Personal information
- Full name: Guelassiognon Sylvain Gbohouo
- Date of birth: 29 October 1988 (age 38)
- Place of birth: Bonoua, Ivory Coast
- Height: 1.90 m (6 ft 3 in)
- Position: Goalkeeper

Team information
- Current team: CO Korhogo

Senior career*
Years	Team	Apps	(Gls)
2008–2015	Séwé Sport	163	(0)
2015–2021	TP Mazembe	156	(0)
2021–2023	Wolkite City	8	(0)
2023–2024	Stade d'Abidjan	0	(0)
2024–2025	Africa Sports	0	(0)
2025–	CO Korhogo	0	(0)

International career
2013–2021	Ivory Coast	65	(0)
- * Club domestic league appearances and goals as of 12 July 2023 (UTC)

Guelassiognon Sylvain Gbohouo (born 29 October 1988) is an Ivorian professional footballer who plays as a goalkeeper for CO Korhogo.

== International career ==
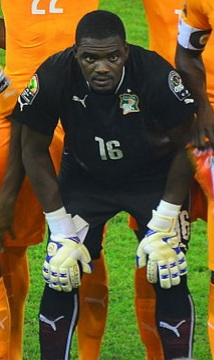
Gbohouo in Ivory Coast national team

Gbohouo made his debut for the Ivory Coast national team on 6 July 2013, in a 4–1 loss against Nigeria at the 2014 African Nations Championship qualification.

He was part of the team that played in the 2014 FIFA World Cup, but did not make an appearance.

He was Ivory Coast's starting goalkeeper at the 2015 Africa Cup of Nations as they went all the way to the final, but a thigh injury sustained in the semi-final against DR Congo saw him miss out the final match in favour of veteran Boubacar Barry. He was still named the tournament's best goalkeeper, and since Barry's retirement, Gbohouo became the Elephants' undisputed number one.

During the 2019 Africa Cup of Nations between Côte d'Ivoire and Algeria in the quarter-finals, Gbohouo was elected man of the match, despite the defeat of his team on penalties.

Gbohouo could not participate in the 2021 Africa Cup of Nations due to a positive drug test. He was consequently given an 18-month ban by FIFA and has not played for the Ivory Coast since then.

== Career statistics ==
=== International ===
As of match played 16 November 2021.

Appearances and goals by national team and year
National team	Year	Apps	Goals
Ivory Coast	2013	1	0
Ivory Coast	2014	4	0
Ivory Coast	2015	11	0
Ivory Coast	2016	7	0
Ivory Coast	2017	12	0
Ivory Coast	2018	5	0
Ivory Coast	2019	12	0
Ivory Coast	2020	4	0
Ivory Coast	2021	9	0
Total		65	0

== Honours ==
Séwé Sport

- Côte d'Ivoire Premier Division: 2012–13, 2013–14
- Coupe Houphouët-Boigny: 2012, 2013, 2014

Mazembe

- Linafoot: 2015–16, 2016–17, 2018–19
- DR Congo Super Cup: 2016
- CAF Champions League: 2015
- CAF Confederation Cup: 2016, 2017
- CAF Super Cup: 2016

Ivory Coast

- Africa Cup of Nations: 2015

Individual

- Africa Cup of Nations Team of the Tournament: 2015
