= Wonlo Coulibaly =

Ivorian footballer

Personal information
- Full name: Wonlo Coulibaly
- Date of birth: 22 December 1991 (age 34)
- Place of birth: Youhoulil, Ivory Coast
- Height: 1.79 m (5 ft 10 in)
- Position: Left-back

Team information
- Current team: Duhok

Senior career*
Years	Team	Apps	(Gls)
2014–2015	Denguélé		
2015–2017	Tanda		
2017–2019	ASEC Mimosas		
2019–2021	TP Mazembe		
2021	Al-Suwaiq		
2022–	ASEC Mimosas		
2024	Duhok SC		

International career^{‡}
2018–2019	Ivory Coast	13	(0)
- * Club domestic league appearances and goals ‡ National team caps and goals as of 23 July 2021

Wonlo Coulibaly (born 22 December 1991) is an Ivorian professional footballer who plays as a left-back for ASEC Mimosas.

== Club career ==
Coulibaly started his career at the age of 16 at Ivorian club Denguélé. He played for the club for 7 years, before moving to AS Tanda in 2015, where he wore the number 4 shirt. After just two seasons in Tanda, his performances earned him a move to Abidjan club ASEC Mimosas, a club who have produced some of the all-time greats of football in Ivorian football, such as Yaya and Kolo Touré, Salomon Kalou, Emmanuel Eboué and Gervinho. He wore the number 25 at the club. In 2018–19, he was named as the player of the year for the Ivorian Ligue 1. He spent two years in the capital, before leaving on a free in 2019. He signed for Congolese giants TP Mazembe later that year. Since signing for the club from Lubumbashi, he has made 10 appearances in the CAF Champions League, finding the net once in a 5–2 defeat to Moroccan outfit Wydad.

== International career ==
He made his Ivory Coast national football team debut on 14 January 2018, in a CHAN 2018 game against Namibia.

He was selected for the 2019 Africa Cup of Nations squad. He has been capped 10 times and wears the number 2 shirt for his nation.

== Career statistics ==
=== International ===
As of matches played on 14 July 2019

Ivory Coast national team
Year	Apps	Goals
2018	3	0
2019	7	0
Total	10	0
