= Buhle Mkhwanazi =

South African soccer player

Personal information
- Full name: Buhlebuyeza Wilson Mkhwanazi
- Date of birth: 1 February 1990 (age 36)
- Place of birth: Bloemfontein, South Africa
- Height: 1.82 m (6 ft 0 in)
- Position: Centre-back

Team information
- Current team: Siwelele
- Number: 35

Youth career
- School of Excellence
- Bidvest Wits
- Bloemfontein Celtic
- –2010: Mamelodi Sundowns

Senior career*
Years	Team	Apps	(Gls)
2010–2013	Mamelodi Sundowns	10	(0)
2011–2012	→ Bloemfontein Celtic (loan)	20	(0)
2012–2013	→ Pretoria University (loan)	19	(0)
2013–2014	Pretoria University	28	(0)
2014–2020	Bidvest Wits	131	(7)
2021–2022	SuperSport United	8	(0)
2023–2024	Wits University		
2025	Highbury	1	(0)
2025–	Siwelele	3	(0)

International career
2013–2019	South Africa	21	(0)
- * Club domestic league appearances and goals as of 16:33, 28 September 2025 (UTC)

Buhlebuyeza Wilson Mkhwanazi (born 1 February 1990) is a South African soccer player who plays as a centre-back for Siwelele in the South African Premier Division. He has previously played in the Premier Division Mamelodi Sundowns, Bloemfontein Celtic, Pretoria University, Bidvest Wits and SuperSport United, and has been capped 21 times by South Africa.

== Club career ==
Having played youth football with Bidvest Wits and Bloemfontein Celtic, Mkhwanazi was promoted from Mamelodi Sundowns' development squad to their first team in 2010. He made 10 first team appearances during the 2010–11 season.

He joined Bloemfontein Celtic on loan during the 2011–12 season, and was named Celtic's young player of the season for 2011–12, in which he played 20 times. He spent the 2012–13 season on loan at University of Pretoria, often nicknamed AmaTuks, where he made 19 appearances, before returning to the club on a permanent basis in summer 2013. He spent the 2013–14 season as captain of AmaTuks, and played 28 times for the club that season.

In summer 2014, it was announced that Mkhwanazi had signed for Bidvest Wits. The fee was reported to be R 7,000,000, though Mkhwanazi denied this. He scored the first goal of his senior career on 26 November 2014, to put Wits 2–0 up in an eventual 2–2 draw with Mpumalanga Black Aces. He was named in the Premier Soccer League Team of the Week following that match. In January 2019, he signed a new contract with the club until 2021. Across six years with Bidvest Wits, Mkhwanazi played 131 times and scored 7 goals.

Following the sale of Bidvest Wits to Tshakhuma Tsha Madzivhandila (TTM) in 2020, it was reported that Mkhwanazi would stay with TTM to see out the remainder of his contract, as he rejected a payout of R 2,000,000 as it was below his annual wage. However a protracted dispute occurred between Mkhwanazi and TTM, with it reported by The Sowetan that TTM were asking Mkhwanazi to take a pay cut, which he rejected. Mkhwanazi did not play for TTM, or any other club during the dispute, and lived off his savings during the 2020–21 season.

On 18 August 2021, Mkhwanazi signed for SuperSport United on a one-year contract. He played 8 matches for the club before being barred from first team training in 2022 for refusing to take a COVID-19 vaccine.

He had a spell playing with Wits University in 2023–24, before he signed for National First Division club Highbury in January 2025.

In August 2025, he signed for newly-formed South African Premier Division club Siwelele.

== International career ==
Mkhwanazi has made 21 appearances for the South Africa national team. He made his debut for South Africa at the 2013 COSAFA Cup in Zambia, and played eight times in total for the national team in 2013 and 2014. In March 2018, he was recalled to the national side for the 2018 Four Nations Tournament, and made his first appearance since 2014 in this tournament against Angola. South Africa won 6–5 in a penalty shootout after a 1–1 draw in this match, though South Africa went behind in the first half after Mkhwanazi underhit a backpass to goalkeeper Darren Keet, which was intercepted by Djalma Campos who scored past Keet. Mkhwanazi was part of South Africa's 23-man squad for the 2019 Africa Cup of Nations, and made 5 appearances at the tournament as South Africa were eliminated in the quarter-finals.

== Style of play ==
Mkhwanazi was described by Independent Online as a "centre back with a little bit of smarts" following his international debut, and added that he "has the necessary anticipation to play either a man-marking role or as a sweeper", and that he is "very good in the air" despite his size.

== Personal life ==
During a spell in which he was out of contract, Mkhwanazi began running an Instagram account dedicated to his photography.

== Career statistics ==
=== International ===
As of matches played on 14 November 2019

Appearances and goals by national team and year
National team	Year	Apps	Goals
South Africa	2013	5	0
South Africa	2014	3	0
South Africa	2015	0	0
South Africa	2016	0	0
South Africa	2017	0	0
South Africa	2018	6	0
South Africa	2019	7	0
Total		21	0
