= 2019 Africa Cup of Nations Group E =

Football tournament group stage

Group E of the 2019 Africa Cup of Nations took place from 24 June to 2 July 2019. The group consisted of Angola, Mali, Mauritania and Tunisia.

Mali and Tunisia advanced to the round of 16.

== Teams ==
Draw position	Team	Zone	Method of qualification	Date of qualification	Finals appearance	Last appearance	Previous best performance	FIFA Rankings	
Draw position	Team	Zone	Method of qualification	Date of qualification	Finals appearance	Last appearance	Previous best performance	April 2019 (Note: The rankings of April 2019 were used for seeding for the final draw.)	June 2019
E1	Tunisia	UNAF	Group J winners	16 October 2018	19th	2017	Winners (2004)	28	25
E2	Mali	WAFU	Group C winners	17 November 2018	11th	2017	Runners-up (1972)	65	62
E3	Mauritania	WAFU	Group I runners-up	18 November 2018	1st	—	Debut	103	103
E4	Angola	COSAFA	Group I winners	22 March 2019	8th	2013	Quarter-finals (2008, 2010)	122	123

== Standings ==
Pos	Team	Pld	W	D	L	GF	GA	GD	Pts	Qualification
1	Mali	3	2	1	0	6	2	+4	7	Advance to knockout stage
2	Tunisia	3	0	3	0	2	2	0	3	Advance to knockout stage
3	Angola	3	0	2	1	1	2	−1	2	
4	Mauritania	3	0	2	1	1	4	−3	2	

Source: CAF
Rules for classification: Tiebreakers

In the round of 16:

- The winners of Group E, Mali advanced to play the runners-up of Group D, Ivory Coast.
- The runners-up of Group E, Tunisia, advanced to play the winners of Group F, Ghana.

== Matches ==
=== Tunisia vs Angola ===
24 June 2019
19:00

Tunisia	1–1	Angola
Msakni 34' (pen.)	Report	Djalma 73'

Suez Stadium, Suez
Attendance: 7,345
Referee: Bamlak Tessema Weyesa (Ethiopia)

Tunisia	Angola

GK	1	Farouk Ben Mustapha
CB	3	Dylan Bronn
CB	6	Rami Bedoui
CB	4	Yassine Meriah
CM	20	Ghailene Chaalali	(yellow card) 27'	(substituted off) 68'
CM	5	Oussama Haddadi
CM	7	Youssef Msakni (c)	(yellow card) 50'
RW	2	Wajdi Kechrida
LW	17	Ellyes Skhiri
CF	23	Naïm Sliti		(substituted off) 79'
CF	10	Wahbi Khazri
Substitutions:
MF	13	Ferjani Sassi		(substituted on) 68'
MF	9	Anice Badri		(substituted on) 79'
Manager:
(France) Alain Giresse

GK	12	Tony Cabaça	(yellow card) 33'
CB	15	Bastos Quissanga
CB	2	Bruno Gaspar
CB	5	Dani Massunguna
RM	16	Stélvio		(substituted off) 46'
CM	8	Paizo
CM	18	Herenilson
LM	7	Djalma Campos
RW	20	Wilson Eduardo		(substituted off) 46'
CF	17	Mateus (c)		(substituted off) 87'
LW	9	Fredy
Substitutions:
FW	10	Gelson Dala		(substituted on) 46'
FW	11	Geraldo		(substituted on) 46'
MF	13	Macaia		(substituted on) 87'
Manager:
(Serbia) Srđan Vasiljević

Man of the Match:
Wahbi Khazri (Tunisia)

Assistant referees:
Waleed Ahmed Ali (Sudan)
Samuel Temesgin (Ethiopia)
Fourth official:
Peter Waweru (Kenya)

=== Mali vs Mauritania ===
24 June 2019
22:00

Mali	4–1	Mauritania
Diaby 37'; Marega 45' (pen.); A. Traoré II 55'; A. Traoré I 74'	Report	El Hacen 72' (pen.)

Suez Stadium, Suez
Attendance: 6,202
Referee: Jean-Jacques Ndala (DR Congo)

Mali	Mauritania

GK	16	Djigui Diarra
RB	2	Hamari Traoré
CB	3	Youssouf Koné
CB	15	Mamadou Fofana	(yellow card) 71'
LB	13	Molla Wagué
CM	11	Lassana Coulibaly
CM	8	Diadie Samassékou
RW	21	Adama Traoré II		(substituted off) 61'
AM	23	Abdoulay Diaby (c)		(substituted off) 87'
LW	19	Moussa Djenepo	(yellow card) 31'	(substituted off) 61'
CF	9	Moussa Marega
Substitutions:
FW	7	Moussa Doumbia		(substituted on) 61'
MF	14	Adama Traoré I		(substituted on) 61'
MF	4	Amadou Haidara		(substituted on) 87'
Manager:
Mohamed Magassouba

GK	1	Brahim Souleymane	(yellow card) 79'
RB	4	Harouna Sy		(substituted off) 53'
CB	15	Bakary N'Diaye	(yellow card) 19'
CB	5	Abdoul Ba (c)
LB	3	Aly Abeid
RM	18	Hacen El Ide
CM	19	Ibréhima Coulibaly		(substituted off) 46'
CM	14	Mohamed Yali
LM	6	Khassa Camara		(substituted off) 82'
CF	10	Adama Ba
CF	7	Ismaël Diakité
Substitutions:
FW	11	Bessam		(substituted on) 46'
DF	2	Moustapha Diaw	(yellow card) 84'	(substituted on) 53'
MF	23	Silèye Gaye		(substituted on) 82'
Manager:
(France) Corentin Martins

Man of the Match:
Abdoulay Diaby (Mali)

Assistant referees:
Olivier Safari (DR Congo)
Soulaimane Amaldine (Comoros)
Fourth official:
Andofetra Rakotojaona (Madagascar)

=== Tunisia vs Mali ===
28 June 2019
16:30

Tunisia	1–1	Mali
Khazri 70'	Report	Samassékou 60'

Suez Stadium, Suez
Attendance: 16,085
Referee: Joshua Bondo (Botswana)

Tunisia	Mali

GK	16	Mouez Hassen
RB	2	Wajdi Kechrida
CB	3	Dylan Bronn
CB	4	Yassine Meriah
LB	5	Oussama Haddadi
CM	17	Ellyes Skhiri	(yellow card) 37'
CM	20	Ghailene Chaalali	(yellow card) 64'
RW	9	Anice Badri	(yellow card) 42'	(substituted off) 62'
AM	10	Wahbi Khazri (c)
LW	23	Naïm Sliti		(substituted off) 84'
CF	11	Taha Yassine Khenissi		(substituted off) 70'
Substitutions:
MF	7	Youssef Msakni		(substituted on) 62'
FW	8	Firas Chaouat		(substituted on) 70'
MF	19	Ayman Ben Mohamed		(substituted on) 84'
Manager:
(France) Alain Giresse

GK	16	Djigui Diarra
RB	2	Hamari Traoré
CB	13	Molla Wagué
CB	15	Mamadou Fofana
LB	3	Youssouf Koné
RM	23	Abdoulay Diaby (c)		(substituted off) 80'
CM	11	Lassana Coulibaly
CM	8	Diadie Samassékou	(yellow card) 70'
CM	4	Amadou Haidara	(yellow card) 11'	(substituted off) 86'
LM	19	Moussa Djenepo		(substituted off) 75'
CF	9	Moussa Marega	(yellow card) 59'
Substitutions:
FW	7	Moussa Doumbia		(substituted on) 75'
MF	14	Adama Traoré I		(substituted on) 80'
MF	21	Adama Traoré II		(substituted on) 86'
Manager:
Mohamed Magassouba

Man of the Match:
Moussa Marega (Mali)

Assistant referees:
Arsenio Maringule (Mozambique)
Souru Phatsoane (Lesotho)
Fourth official:
Peter Waweru (Kenya)

=== Mauritania vs Angola ===
29 June 2019
16:30

Mauritania	0–0	Angola
	Report

Suez Stadium, Suez
Attendance: 10,120
Referee: Ibrahim Nour El Din (Egypt)

Mauritania	Angola

GK	1	Brahim Souleymane
RB	2	Moustapha Diaw
CB	15	Bakary N'Diaye
CB	5	Abdoul Ba (c)		(substituted off) 62'
LB	3	Aly Abeid	(yellow card) 90+3'
CM	11	Bessam
CM	14	Mohamed Yali
CM	6	Khassa Camara		(substituted off) 70'
AM	18	Hacen El Ide
CF	7	Ismaël Diakité
CF	10	Adama Ba
Substitutions:
DF	21	Diadié Diarra		(substituted on) 62'
MF	23	Silèye Gaye		(substituted on) 70'
Manager:
(France) Corentin Martins

GK	12	Tony Cabaça
RB	2	Bruno Gaspar	(yellow card) 53'
CB	5	Dani Massunguna
CB	15	Bastos Quissanga
LB	8	Paizo
CM	18	Herenilson
CM	4	Show
RW	10	Gelson Dala
AM	9	Fredy Kulembé		(substituted off) 56'
LW	7	Djalma Campos		(substituted off) 78'
CF	17	Mateus (c)		(substituted off) 56'
Substitutions:
FW	11	Geraldo	(yellow card) 90+3'	(substituted on) 56'
FW	20	Wilson Eduardo		(substituted on) 56'
FW	14	Mabululu		(substituted on) 78'
Manager:
(Serbia) Srđan Vasiljević

Man of the Match:
Gelson Dala (Angola)

Assistant referees:
Tahssen Abo El Sadat (Egypt)
Ahmed Hossam Taha (Egypt)
Fourth official:
Gehad Grisha (Egypt)

=== Mauritania vs Tunisia ===
2 July 2019
21:00

Mauritania	0–0	Tunisia
	Report

Suez Stadium, Suez
Attendance: 7,732
Referee: Louis Hakizimana (Rwanda)

Mauritania	Tunisia

GK	1	Brahim Souleymane
RB	2	Moustapha Diaw
CB	15	Bakary N'Diaye
CB	5	Abdoul Ba (c)		(substituted off) 17'
LB	3	Aly Abeid
CM	14	Mohamed Yali
CM	19	Ibréhima Coulibaly	(yellow card) 45+2'
RW	7	Ismaël Diakité	(yellow card) 31'
AM	18	Hacen El Ide	(yellow card) 53'
LW	11	Bessam		(substituted off) 87'
CF	10	Adama Ba
Substitutions:
DF	21	Diadié Diarra		(substituted on) 17' (substituted off) 61'
MF	8	Diallo Guidileye		(substituted on) 61'
FW	17	Souleymane Anne		(substituted on) 87'
Manager:
(France) Corentin Martins

GK	16	Mouez Hassen
RB	2	Wajdi Kechrida
CB	3	Dylan Bronn	(yellow card) 36'
CB	4	Yassine Meriah
LB	5	Oussama Haddadi
CM	17	Ellyes Skhiri
CM	12	Karim Aouadhi	(yellow card) 53'
RW	18	Bassem Srarfi		(substituted off) 46'
AM	10	Wahbi Khazri
LW	23	Naïm Sliti		(substituted off) 79'
CF	7	Youssef Msakni (c)
Substitutions:
FW	11	Taha Yassine Khenissi		(substituted on) 46'
DF	14	Mohamed Dräger		(substituted on) 79'
Manager:
(France) Alain Giresse

Man of the Match:
Moustapha Diaw (Mauritania)

Assistant referees:
Arsenio Maringule (Mozambique)
Sidibe Sidiki (Guinea)
Fourth official:
Pacifique Ndabihawenimana (Burundi)

=== Angola vs Mali ===
2 July 2019
21:00

Angola	0–1	Mali
	Report	Haidara 37'

Ismailia Stadium, Ismailia
Attendance: 8,135
Referee: Redouane Jiyed (Morocco)

Angola	Mali

GK	12	Tony Cabaça
RB	2	Bruno Gaspar
CB	15	Bastos Quissanga	(yellow card) 90+2'
CB	5	Dani Massunguna
LB	8	Paizo
CM	7	Djalma Campos
CM	18	Herenilson	(yellow card) 80'
RW	17	Mateus (c)		(substituted off) 52'
AM	9	Fredy Kulembé		(substituted off) 53'
LW	11	Geraldo		(substituted off) 81'
CF	10	Gelson Dala
Substitutions:
FW	20	Wilson Eduardo		(substituted on) 52'
MF	4	Show		(substituted on) 53'
FW	14	Mabululu		(substituted on) 81'
Manager:
(Serbia) Srđan Vasiljević

GK	16	Djigui Diarra	(yellow card) 61'
RB	17	Falaye Sacko
CB	5	Kiki Kouyaté
CB	13	Molla Wagué (c)
LB	6	Massadio Haïdara
CM	4	Amadou Haidara		(substituted off) 73'
CM	11	Lassana Coulibaly
RW	14	Adama Traoré I		(substituted off) 81'
AM	21	Adam Traoré II
LW	7	Moussa Doumbia		(substituted off) 58'
CF	10	Kalifa Coulibaly
Substitutions:
FW	12	Sékou Koïta		(substituted on) 58'
MF	18	Cheick Doucouré		(substituted on) 73'
FW	9	Moussa Marega		(substituted on) 81'
Manager:
Mohamed Magassouba

Man of the Match:
Amadou Haidara (Mali)

Assistant referees:
Waleed Ahmed Ali (Sudan)
Tesfagiorghis Berhe (Eritrea)
Fourth official:
Bernard Camille (Seychelles)
