= Adama Traoré (footballer, born 28 June 1995) =

Malian footballer

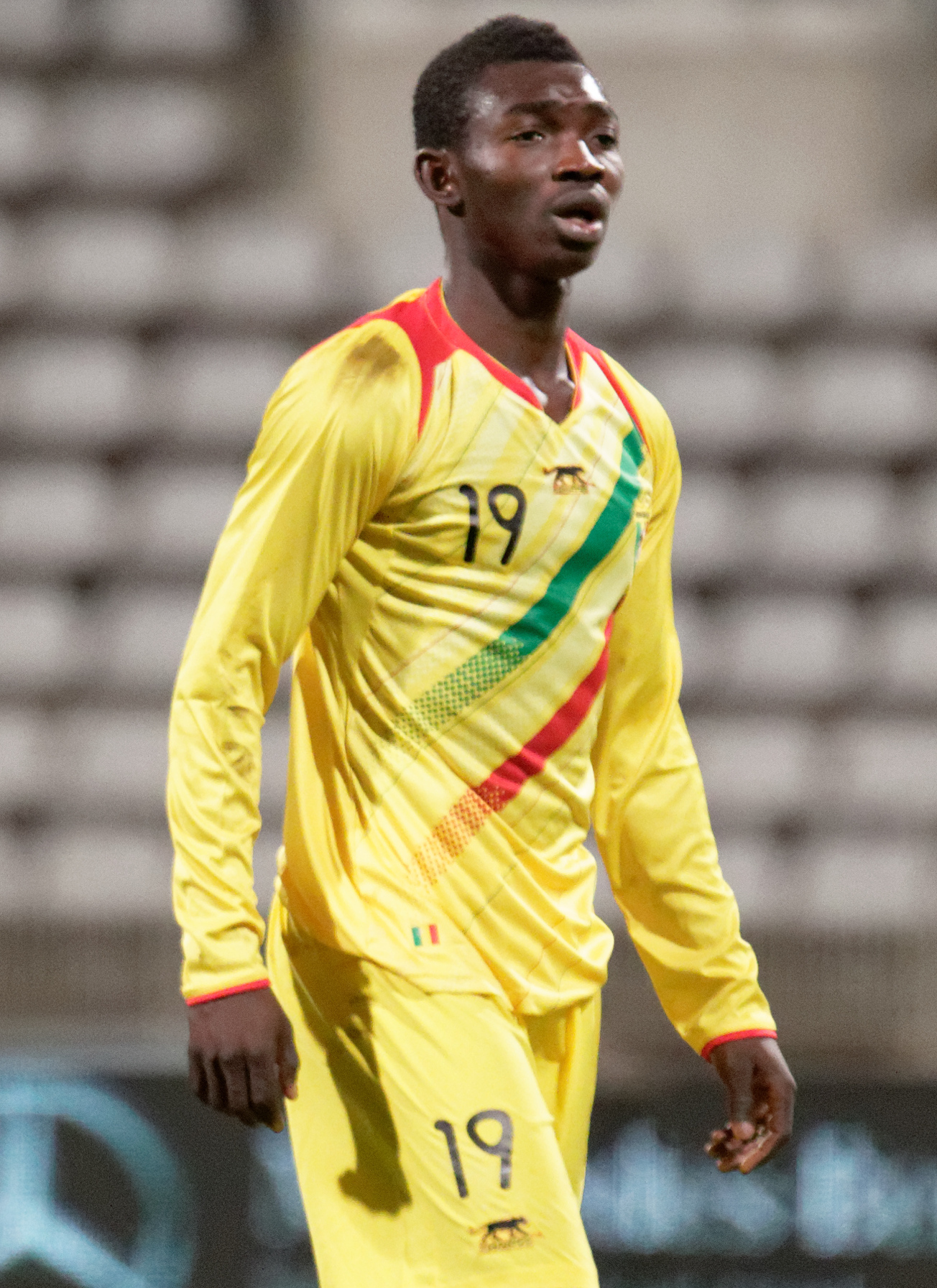
- Traoré with Mali in 2015

Personal information
- Full name: Adama Traoré
- Date of birth: 28 June 1995 (age 31)
- Place of birth: Bamako, Mali
- Height: 1.78 m (5 ft 10 in)
- Position: Midfielder

Youth career
- 2008–2013: JMG Academy Bamako

Senior career*
Years	Team	Apps	(Gls)
2013–2014	AS Bakaridjan	3	(0)
2014–2015	Lille	20	(2)
2014	→ Royal Mouscron (loan)	2	(0)
2015–2020	Monaco	22	(5)
2017	→ Rio Ave (loan)	7	(1)
2019	→ Cercle Brugge (loan)	8	(0)
2019–2020	→ Metz (loan)	15	(1)
2020–2022	Hatayspor	52	(1)
2022–2024	Hull City	36	(3)
2024–2026	Amedspor	61	(10)

International career^{‡}
2014–2015	Mali U20	12	(4)
2015–	Mali	41	(5)
Medal record
Representing Mali
FIFA U-20 World Cup
Third place	2015 New Zealand	U-20 Team
- * Club domestic league appearances and goals as of 20:26, 5 May 2026 (UTC) ‡ National team caps and goals as of 15 October 2024

Adama Traoré (born 28 June 1995), also known as Adama Noss Traoré, is a Malian professional footballer who plays as a midfielder. He last played for Amedspor and has represented the Mali national team since 2015.

After winning the Golden Ball as best player at the 2015 FIFA U-20 World Cup, he made his senior debut for Mali. He represented the country at the Africa Cup of Nations in 2017 and 2019.

== Club career ==
=== Mali and Lille ===
Born in Bamako, Traoré joined his hometown's JMG Academy at the age of 12 in 2007. Five years later he joined Malian Première Division club AS Bakaridjan where he was only able to play three games before he got injured.

In January 2014, Traoré signed for Ligue 1 club Lille and was immediately loaned out to Belgian Second Division club Royal Mouscron-Péruwelz. He made his Ligue 1 debut on 24 September 2014, in a 1–0 away defeat against Nice. On 7 January 2015, he scored his first competitive goal at senior level for Lille in a 1–0 home-league win over Thonon Évian Savoie F. C.

=== Monaco ===
On 10 July 2015, Traoré joined AS Monaco on a four-year deal worth €14 million. On 4 August, he made his UEFA Champions League debut in a 4–0 win against Young Boys in the third qualifying round, coming on as an 80th-minute substitute for Mario Pašalić.

In January 2017, Traoré was loaned out until the end of the season to Primeira Liga side Rio Ave FC. He played seven games for the team from Vila do Conde, and scored the only goal of their win at Boavista on 1 April.

In January 2019, he was loaned out for the same duration to Belgian First Division A side Cercle Brugge KSV. On 31 August, he went on a season-long loan to fellow Ligue 1 club Metz. He scored his first goal for them on 23 November, equalising in a 1–1 home draw with Reims.

=== Hatayspor ===
On 11 September 2020, Traoré moved to Hatayspor of the Turkish Süper Lig, on a two-year deal with the option of a third.

=== Hull City ===
On 1 September 2022, Traoré signed for EFL Championship club Hull City on a two-year deal. He made his debut for Hull City on 25 February 2023, coming on as a 78th-minute substitute for Greg Docherty, in a 1–0 loss away to Bristol City. On 10 April 2023, Traoré scored his first goal for the Tigers, with the only goal in a 1–0 win at home to Millwall. On 19 May 2024, the club announced he would be released in the summer when his contract expired.

=== Amedspor ===
On 25 June 2024, it was announced that Traoré would sign for TFF Second League club Amedspor once his Hull contract expired.

== International career ==
Traoré was part of the Mali under-20 team who participated in the 2015 FIFA U-20 World Cup in New Zealand. During the competition, he scored four goals and had three assists, and helped Mali win the bronze medal and earned himself the Adidas Golden Ball as the best player in the competition.

On 9 October 2015, Traoré made his national team debut in a 4–1 friendly win over Burkina Faso. On 4 September 2016, he scored his first international goal in a 5–2 win against Benin in the 2017 Africa Cup of Nations qualification. On 4 January 2017, Traoré was named in Mali's 23-man squad for the 2017 Africa Cup of Nations in Gabon, and was unused as the team were eliminated in the group stage. Two years later, on 16 June 2019, he was named in Mali's 23-man squad for the 2019 Africa Cup of Nations in Egypt. On 24 June 2019, he scored in his side's 4–1 opening match win against Mauritania. Mali was eliminated in the Round of 16 after a defeat to Ivory Coast.

In December 2021, Traoré was selected by manager Mohamed Magassouba to participate in the 2021 Africa Cup of Nations. On 2 January 2024, he was included in the list of twenty-seven Malian players chosen by Éric Chelle to compete in the 2023 Africa Cup of Nations.

== Personal life ==
Traoré was an international teammate of a player of the same name, who was born in the same month. The two were also at Metz at the same time. To distinguish between them, Traoré was also known as Adama Noss Traoré.

== Career statistics ==
=== Club ===
As of 16 February 2025.

Appearances and goals by club, season and competition
Club	Season	League			National cup (Note: Includes Coupe de France, Turkish Cup)		League cup (Note: Includes Coupe de la Ligue, EFL Cup)		Continental		Other		Total	
Club	Season	Division	Apps	Goals	Apps	Goals	Apps	Goals	Apps	Goals	Apps	Goals	Apps	Goals
AS Bakaridjan	2013–14	Malian Première Division	3	0	—		—		—		—		3	0
Lille	2013–14	Ligue 1	0	0	0	0	0	0	—		—		0	0
Lille	2014–15	Ligue 1	20	2	1	0	3	0	0	0	—		24	2
Lille	Total		20	2	1	0	3	0	0	0	—		24	2
Royal Excel Mouscron (loan)	2013–14	Belgian Second Division	2	0	0	0	0	0	—		1 (Note: Appearance in Belgian Second Division promotion play-offs)	0	3	0
Monaco	2015–16	Ligue 1	6	0	0	0	0	0	2 (Note: One appearances in UEFA Champions League, one appearance in UEFA Europa League)	0	—		8	0
Monaco	2016–17	Ligue 1	5	2	0	0	1	0	1 (Note: Appearance in UEFA Champions League)	0	—		7	2
Monaco	2017–18	Ligue 1	3	3	0	0	0	0	0	0	—		3	3
Monaco	2018–19	Ligue 1	6	0	0	0	0	0	1	0	—		7	0
Monaco	2019–20	Ligue 1	2	0	0	0	0	0	0	0	—		2	0
Monaco	Total		22	5	0	0	1	0	4	0	—		27	5
Rio Ave (loan)	2016–17	Primeira Liga	7	1	0	0	0	0	—		—		7	1
Cercle Brugge (loan)	2018–19	Belgian Pro League	5	0	0	0	—		—		3 (Note: Appearances in Belgian Pro League Europa League play-offs)	0	8	0
Metz (loan)	2019–20	Ligue 1	15	1	1	0	0	0	—		—		16	1
Hatayspor	2020–21	Süper Lig	35	0	1	0	—		—		—		36	0
Hatayspor	2021–22	Süper Lig	17	1	1	0	—		—		—		18	1
Hatayspor	Total		52	1	1	0	—		—		—		54	1
Hull City	2022–23	Championship	12	1	0	0	0	0	—		—		12	1
Hull City	2023–24	Championship	24	2	0	0	1	0	—		—		25	2
Hull City	Total		36	3	0	0	1	0	—		—		37	3
Amedspor	2024–25	TFF 1. Lig	22	5	1	0	—		—		—		23	5
Career total			182	18	5	0	5	0	4	0	4	0	201	18

=== International ===
As of 15 October 2024

Appearances and goals by national team and year
National team	Year	Apps	Goals
Mali	2014	4	0
Mali	2015	3	0
Mali	2016	2	1
Mali	2017	2	0
Mali	2019	9	4
Mali	2020	1	0
Mali	2021	10	0
Mali	2022	4	0
Mali	2024	7	0
Total		41	5

Scores and results list Mali's goal tally first, score column indicates score after each Traoré goal.

List of international goals scored by Adama Traoré
No.	Date	Venue	Opponent	Score	Result	Competition
1	4 September 2016	Stade du 26 Mars, Bamako, Mali	Benin	4–1	5–2	2017 Africa Cup of Nations qualification
2	26 March 2019	Stade Léopold Sédar Senghor, Dakar, Senegal	Senegal	1–0	1–2	Friendly
3	23 June 2019	Suez Stadium, Suez, Egypt	Mauritania	3–0	4–1	2019 Africa Cup of Nations
