= Abdoulay Diaby =

Footballer (born 1991)

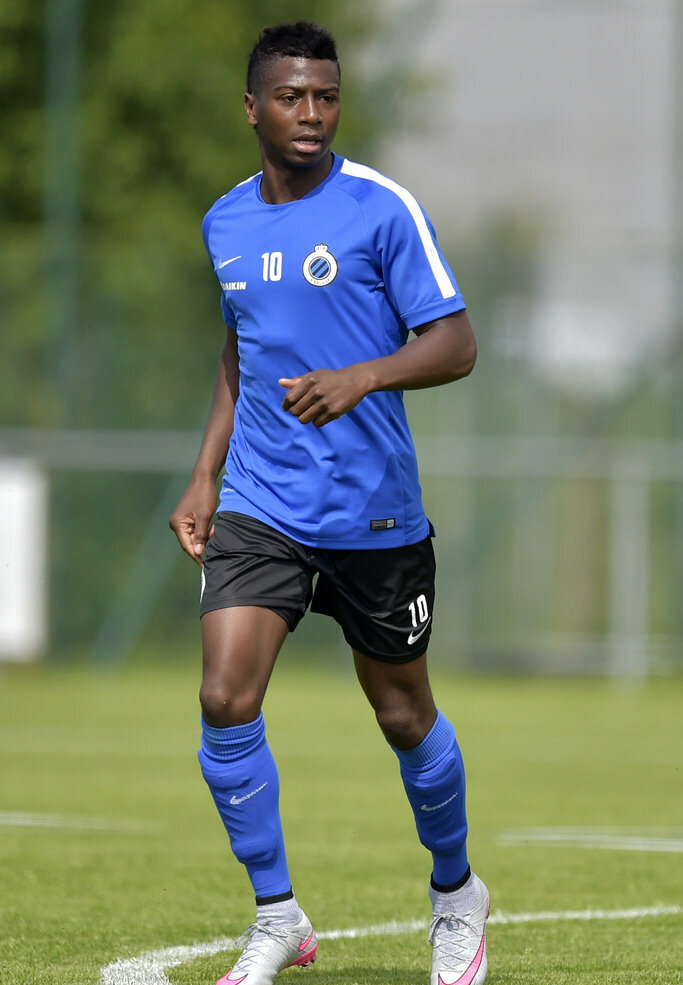
- Diaby training with Club Brugge in 2015

Personal information
- Full name: Abdoulay Diaby
- Date of birth: 21 May 1991 (age 35)
- Place of birth: Nanterre, France
- Height: 1.73 m (5 ft 8 in)
- Position: Winger

Team information
- Current team: Al-Batin
- Number: 23

Youth career
- Sedan

Senior career*
Years	Team	Apps	(Gls)
2009–2013	Sedan	66	(16)
2013–2015	Lille	3	(0)
2013–2015	→ Mouscron-Péruwelz (loan)	37	(15)
2015–2018	Club Brugge	67	(24)
2018–2021	Sporting CP	31	(2)
2019–2020	→ Beşiktaş (loan)	31	(5)
2020–2021	→ Getafe (loan)	1	(0)
2021	→ Anderlecht (loan)	9	(1)
2021–2023	Al Jazira	33	(11)
2023	Ittihad Kalba	12	(0)
2023–2024	Pendikspor	27	(2)
2025	Boavista	12	(1)
2025–	Al-Batin	24	(9)

International career^{‡}
2014–	Mali	31	(7)
- * Club domestic league appearances and goals as of 14 August 2026 ‡ National team caps and goals as of 18:43, 9 January 2026 (UTC)

Abdoulay Diaby (born 21 May 1991) is a professional footballer who plays as a left winger for Saudi First Division League club Al-Batin. Born in France, he plays for the Mali national team.

== Club career ==
=== Sedan ===
Born in Nanterre, France, Diaby began his career at Sedan, having been passed by INF Clairefontaine (France national Football team Centre). After progressing through the ranks of Sedan, Diaby made his professional debut on 4 May 2010 against Dijon, where he came on as a substitute for Lossémy Karaboué in the 73rd minute, in a 3–1 loss. He made another appearances for the side three days later on 7 May 2010, again coming on as a substitute, in a 0–0 draw against AC Arles-Avignon. He went on to make two appearances in the 2009–10 season.

In the 2010–11 season, Diaby made his first team appearance on 20 November 2010, where he started the match, in a 2–0 win over FC Steinseltz in the seventh round of Coupe de France. On 13 January 2011, he signed his first professional contract with the club, keeping him until 2014. He scored his first goal for the club and set up one of the goals, in a 5–3 loss against FC Istres on 11 March 2011. Seven days later, on 18 March 2011, he scored in a follow–up match, in a 1–1 draw against Le Havre. By the end of the 2010–11 season, he had made eleven appearances scoring two times in all competitions.

In the 2011–12 season, Diaby scored his first goal of the season, in a 2–1 loss against Clermont Foot on 12 August 2011. A month later, on 16 September 2011, he scored again, in a 3–0 win over Le Havre. He then scored three goals throughout October, scoring against Angers SCO (twice) and Lille. He ended a two-month goal drought on 9 March 2012 when he scored in a 1–1 draw against US Boulogne. He was in another goal drought when on 18 May 2012, he scored in a 2–1 win over Nantes. Despite suffering injuries during the 2011–12 season, Diaby went on to make 31 appearances and scoring nine times in all competitions.

In the 2012–13 season, Diaby scored his first goal of the season, in a 3–2 loss against Nîmes Olympique on 17 August 2012. During a 2–0 win over Clermont Foot on 24 August 2012, he was sent–off for a straight red card in the 80th minute. After serving a match suspension, Diaby returned to the starting line-up and scored in a 3–1 loss against Stade Lavallois on 14 September 2012. After being dropped from the first team for "disciplinary reasons" in early–November, he scored on his return on 9 November 2012, in a 1–1 draw against Gazélec Ajaccio. During a match against Auxerre on 26 February 2013, he scored his seventh goal of the season, in a 1–0 win. Despite suffering from injury and suspension towards the end of the 2012–13 season, Diaby went on to make 28 appearances and scoring seven times in all competitions. Following the club's relegation to Championnat de France Amateur, he was released.

=== Lille ===
It was announced on 30 July 2013 that Diaby joined Lille on a three–year contract with the club.

After his two year stint with Royal Mouscron-Péruwelz came to an end in the 2014–15 season, Diaby signed a two–year contract with Lille, keeping him until 2019. He made his Lille debut on 28 February 2015, where he came on as a late substitute for Divock Origi, in a 2–1 win against Lyon. He went on to make two more appearances later in the season, both coming as a substitute.

=== Royal Mouscron-Péruwelz (loan) ===
Immediately after joining Lille, Diaby moved to Belgium, where he joined Mouscron-Péruwelz.

Diaby made his Royal Mouscron-Péruwelz debut, where he came on as a substitute for Antonio Jakoliš in the 74th minute, in a 2–1 win over RWS Bruxelles on 10 August 2013. On 4 September 2013, he scored his first goal for the club, in a 3–2 win over Eendracht Aalst. After not featuring for the first team in two months, he made his return on 29 November 2013, starting in a 2–0 win over K.S.V. Roeselare. After missing out two matches in mid–January, he scored on his return, in a 2–1 win over Eendracht Aalst on 25 January 2014. Later in the 2013–14 season, Diaby helped the side get promoted to Jupiler Pro League next season. He finished the season, making 20 appearances and scoring four times in all competitions.

It was announced on 12 July 2014 that Diaby re-joined Mouscron-Péruwelz for the second time on loan. In his second season, with Royal Mouscron-Péruwelz in the Jupiler Pro League, he started well scoring against Waasland-Beveren, Standard Liège (twice), Zulte Waregem and Cercle Brugge (twice). He later added his tenth and eleventh goal against Lierse and Waasland-Beveren. In January 2015, Diaby returned to his parent club. By the time of his departure, he made 22 appearances and scoring 12 times (which he was the top scorer at the time and still was at the end of the 2014–15 season) in all competitions.

=== Club Brugge ===
After announcing his intention to move to Belgium, it was announced on 22 May 2015 that Diaby joined Jupiler Pro League side Club Brugge, signing a four-year contract. The transfer move reported to cost €2 million. Upon joining the club, he said his target in his first season at Club Brugge was to score at least 20 goals.

Diaby made his Club Brugge debut on 16 July 2015, where he started the whole game, in a 1–0 against Gent in the Belgian Super Cup. Two weeks later, on 1 August 2015, he made his league debut for Club Brugge, in a 2–1 loss against Sint-Truidense. In a follow up match against KV Mechelen on 1 August 2015, Diaby scored his first goal for the club, in a 3–0 win. On 30 August 2015, he scored four times, in a 7–1 win over Standard Liège. After two months goal drought, he scored twice on 28 October 2015 in a 2–0 win over OH Leuven, followed up by scoring in a 2–0 win over Westerlo. During December, he added four goals, which were against Charleroi, Westerlo (twice) and K.V. Kortrijk. Diaby then scored in both legs against Gent in the semi–finals of the Belgium Cup, which a 1–0 win against them saw them reach the final via away goal. Despite suffering some injuries setback, he eventually played in the final against Standard Liege, but was sent–off for a professional foul on Giannis Maniatis, as Club Brugge eventually lose 2–1. After serving a one-match suspension, he returned to the starting lineup on 9 April 2016 against Gent, which saw Club Brugge win 2–0. He then played a vital role towards the end of the 2015–16 season, including scoring twice, in a 4–0 win over Anderlecht to win the league title for the first time in eleven years. Despite facing competitions from Jelle Vossen, Leandro Pereira, Wesley Moraes, Bernie Ibini-Isei and José Izquierdo throughout the 2015–16 season, Diaby went on to make 47 appearances and scoring 20 times (thirteen of which was the joint top scorer with Vossen) in all competitions.

In the 2016–17 season, Diaby retained his first team place for the side, playing in the striker position. He struggled to score goals as he did last season. soon suffered his own injuries concern as a result. On 25 January 2017, he returned from injury, coming on as a late substitute, in a 2–1 win over Waasland-Beveren. Once again, he suffered an Osteitis pubis that saw him sidelined for the rest of the season. Until the end of the 2016–17 season, Diaby went on to make 20 appearances in all competitions.

At the start of the 2017–18 season, Diaby returned from injury in the pre–season and didn't make his first appearance of the season on 2 August 2017, in the second leg of the UEFA Champions League Qualifying Round against İstanbul Başakşehir, which saw them lose 3–0, and was eliminated from the tournament. Four days later, on 6 August 2017, he scored his first goal of the season, in a 3–1 win over Eupen. Two weeks later, on 20 August 2017, he scored again, in a 2–1 win over K.V. Kortrijk. Throughout December, Diaby produced a goal scoring form against Lokeren, Anderlecht (twice), KV Mechelen and Royal Mouscron-Péruwelz (twice). By December, he scored nine goals for the side this season. In the league's Championship play-offs, Diaby scored four goals for the side, scoring against RSC Charleroi, Standard Liège (twice) and Anderlecht. He suffered ankle injury that saw him sidelined for the rest of the season. Shortly after, the club went on to win the league for the second time for the last two years, as he was among three players to play a role this season to win the Championship. Despite being absent from the first team, due to injuries this season, Diaby continued to remain in the first team despite facing competitions from Vossen and Wesley. Diaby finished the 2017–18 season with 41 appearances and 16 goals in all competitions.

=== Sporting CP ===
It was announced on 21 August 2018 that Diaby joined Portuguese club Sporting CP, signing a five–year contract on an undisclosed fee, though it was reported to cost €4 million. The club also inserted a US$70 million release clause on Diaby. Upon joining the club, Diaby said of the move: "I am very happy to be here. Sporting CP is a great club and as soon as I heard about the possibility of coming here I did not hesitate, I know that Portuguese football has great clubs, that are always participating in European competitions." He made his league debut for the club on 24 September 2018, coming on as an 86th-minute substitute for Nemanja Gudelj in a 1–0 away defeat to Braga.

On 5 October 2020, after spending the entire 2019–20 campaign on loan at Beşiktaş JK, Diaby was loaned to La Liga side Getafe CF, for one year.

On 17 January 2021, Diaby was recalled by Sporting CP from Getafe after three appearances and subsequently loaned to Belgian club RSC Anderlecht until the end of the season.

==== Loan to Anderlecht ====
On 18 January 2021, Diaby joined Belgian First Division A club Anderlecht on loan until the end of the season. The loan included an option to buy.

=== Al-Batin ===
On 10 September 2025, Diaby joined Saudi FDL side Al-Batin.

== International career ==
In October 2014, Diaby was called up by Mali for the first time; then scoring on his debut, in a 2–0 win over Ethiopia on 11 October 2014. Mali eventually qualified for the 2015 Africa Cup of Nations after beating Algeria 2–0 on 19 November 2014.

In late–December 2014, Diaby was listed in the national team 35 men provisional squad. After appearing twice as an unused substitute in the first two matches in the tournament, he made his first appearance of the tournament, where he started the match before being substituted, in a 1–1 draw against Guinea on 28 January 2015.

Almost a year later, on 6 September 2015, Diaby scored his first goal in eleven months, in a 1–1 draw against Benin. In the Africa Cup of Nations qualification, Diaby then scored two goals in two matches between 4 June 2016 and 4 September 2016 against South Sudan and Benin. He then ended his two-year goal drought when he scored the first-half penalty, in a 1–1 draw against Japan on 23 March 2018.

== Career statistics ==
=== Club ===
As of match played 19 December 2025

Appearances and goals by club, season and competition
Club	Season	League			National cup (Note: Includes Coupe de France, Belgian Cup, Taça de Portugal, Turkish Cup)		League cup (Note: Includes Coupe de la Ligue, Taça da Liga)		Continental		Other		Total	
Club	Season	Division	Apps	Goals	Apps	Goals	Apps	Goals	Apps	Goals	Apps	Goals	Apps	Goals
Sedan	2009–10	Ligue 2	2	0	0	0	0	0	–		–		2	0
Sedan	2010–11	Ligue 2	10	2	1	0	0	0	–		–		11	2
Sedan	2011–12	Ligue 2	28	7	1	1	2	1	–		–		31	9
Sedan	2012–13	Ligue 2	26	7	3	0	0	0	–		–		29	7
Sedan	Total		66	16	5	1	2	1	–		–		73	18
Lille	2013–14	Ligue 1	0	0	0	0	0	0	0	0	0	0	0	0
Lille	2014–15	Ligue 1	3	0	0	0	0	0	0	0	0	0	3	0
Lille	Total		3	0	0	0	0	0	0	0	0	0	3	0
Royal Excel Mouscron (loan)	2013–14	Belgian Second Division	16	3	0	0	–		–		5 (Note: Appearances in Belgian Second Division promotion play-offs)	1	21	4
Royal Excel Mouscron (loan)	2014–15	Belgian Pro League	21	12	1	0	–		–		–		22	12
Royal Excel Mouscron (loan)	Total		37	15	1	0	–		–		5	1	43	16
Club Brugge	2015–16	Belgian Pro League	24	13	5	4	–		9 (Note: Four appearances in UEFA Champions League, five appearances in UEFA Europa League)	0	8 (Note: Appearances in Belgian Pro League play-offs)	4	46	21
Club Brugge	2016–17	Belgian First Division A	16	0	1	0	–		2 (Note: Appearances in UEFA Champions League)	0	1 (Note: Appearance in Belgian Super Cup)	0	20	0
Club Brugge	2017–18	Belgian First Division A	27	11	4	1	–		3	0	7	4	41	16
Club Brugge	Total		67	24	10	5	–		14	0	16	8	107	37
Sporting CP	2018–19	Primeira Liga	29	2	5	3	4	0	2 (Note: Appearances in UEFA Europa League)	0	–		40	5
Sporting CP	2019–20	Primeira Liga	2	0	0	0	0	0	0	0	1 (Note: Appearance in Supertaça Cândido de Oliveira)	0	3	0
Sporting CP	Total		31	2	5	3	4	0	2	0	1	0	43	5
Beşiktaş (loan)	2019–20	Süper Lig	31	5	3	1	–		3	0	–		37	6
Getafe (loan)	2020–21	La Liga	1	0	2	0	–		–		–		3	0
Al Jazira	2021–22	UAE Pro League	23	10	2	0	3	1	5 (Note: Appearances in AFC Champions League Elite)	0	4 (Note: Three appearances and two goals in FIFA Club World Cup, one appearance in UAE Super Cup)	2	37	13
Al Jazira	2022–23	UAE Pro League	10	1	0	0	4	0	0	0	—		14	1
Al Jazira	Total		33	11	2	0	3	1	5	0	4	2	51	14
Kalba	2022–23	UAE Pro League	12	0	1	0	0	0	—		—		13	0
Pendikspor	2023–24	Süper Lig	27	2	1	0	—		—		—		28	2
Boavista	2024–25	Primeira Liga	12	1	0	0	0	0	—		—		12	1
Al-Batin	2025–26	Saudi First Division League	11	4	2	0	—		—		—		13	4
Career total			331	78	32	14	9	2	24	0	26	11	426	103

=== International ===
As of match played 9 January 2026

Appearances and goals by national team and year
National team	Year	Apps	Goals
Mali	2014	3	1
Mali	2015	5	1
Mali	2016	2	2
Mali	2017	1	0
Mali	2018	4	1
Mali	2019	9	2
Mali	2022	2	0
2025	3	0	
2026	2	0	
Total		31	7

Scores and results list Mali's goal tally first, score column indicates score after each Diaby goal.

List of international goals scored by Abdoulay Diaby
No.	Date	Venue	Opponent	Score	Result	Competition
1	11 October 2014	Addis Ababa Stadium, Addis Ababa, Ethiopia	Ethiopia	1–0	2–0	2015 Africa Cup of Nations qualification
2	6 September 2015	Stade de l'Amitié, Cotonou, Benin	Benin	1–0	1–1	2017 Africa Cup of Nations qualification
3	4 June 2016	Juba Stadium, Juba, South Sudan	South Sudan	1–0	3–0	2017 Africa Cup of Nations qualification
4	4 September 2016	Stade du 26 Mars, Bamako, Mali	Benin	2–0	5–2	2017 Africa Cup of Nations qualification
5	23 March 2018	Stade Maurice Dufrasne, Liège, Belgium	Japan	1–0	1–1	Friendly
6	16 June 2019	Jassim bin Hamad Stadium, Doha, Qatar	Algeria	1–0	2–3	Friendly
7	24 June 2019	Suez Stadium, Suez, Egypt	Mauritania	1–0	4–1	2019 Africa Cup of Nations

== Honours ==
Club Brugge

- Belgian Pro League: 2015–16, 2017–18
- Belgian Super Cup: 2016

Sporting CP

- Taça de Portugal: 2018–19
- Taça da Liga: 2018–19

Al Jazira

- UAE Super Cup: 2021
