= Djalma Campos =

Angolan footballer (born 1987)

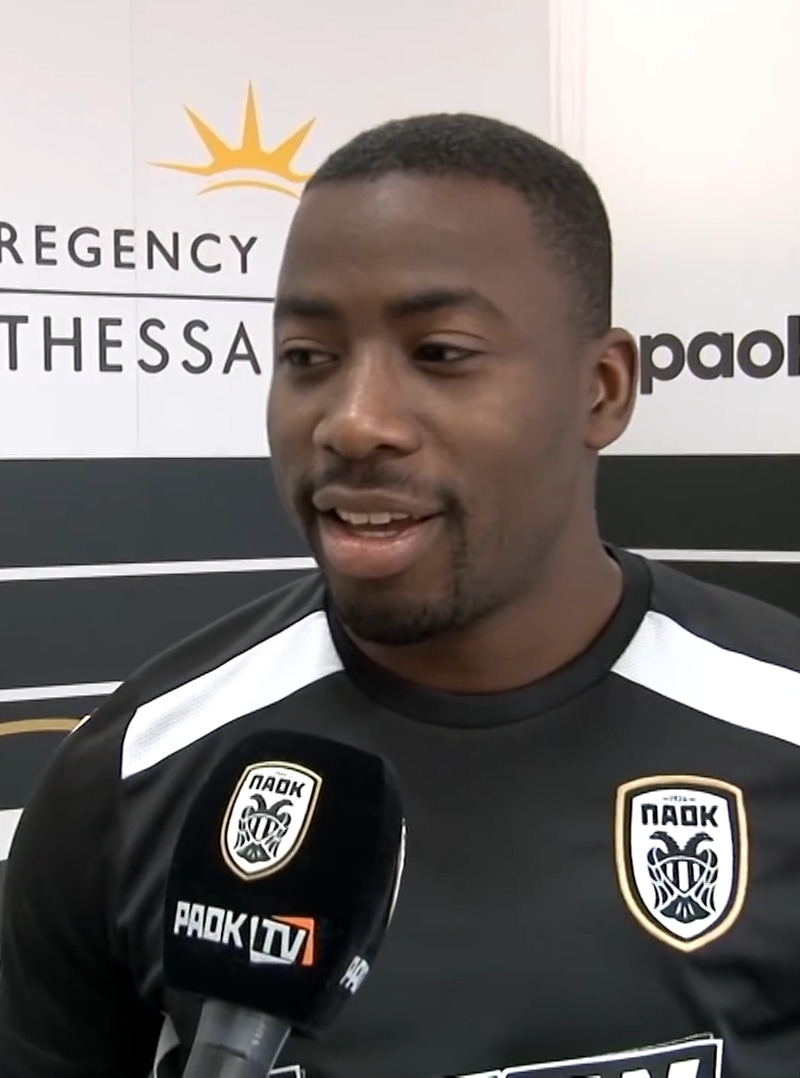
- Djalma with PAOK in 2018

Personal information
- Full name: Djalma Braume Manuel Abel Campos
- Date of birth: 30 May 1987 (age 39)
- Place of birth: Luanda, Angola
- Height: 1.76 m (5 ft 9 in)
- Position: Forward

Youth career
- 1998–2004: Loures
- 2005: CAC Pontinha
- 2005–2006: Alverca

Senior career*
Years	Team	Apps	(Gls)
2006–2010	Marítimo B	22	(4)
2007–2011	Marítimo	96	(19)
2011–2015	Porto	14	(1)
2012–2013	→ Kasımpaşa (loan)	22	(3)
2013–2015	→ Konyaspor (loan)	52	(8)
2015–2016	Gençlerbirliği	27	(7)
2016–2018	PAOK	53	(9)
2018–2020	Alanyaspor	50	(8)
2020–2021	Farense	7	(0)
2022–2023	Trofense	25	(1)
Total		368	(60)

International career
2008–2019	Angola	46	(8)
- * Club domestic league appearances and goals

Djalma Braume Manuel Abel Campos (born 30 May 1987) is an Angolan former professional footballer who played as a forward.

He spent most of his career in Portugal, starting with Marítimo where he remained five seasons. In 2011, he signed with Porto, and also played several years in the Turkish Süper Lig.

An international since 2008, Campos represented Angola in four Africa Cup of Nations tournaments.

== Club career ==
The son of Abel Campos, a winger who played several seasons in Portugal, including with S.L. Benfica and S.C. Braga, Campos was born in Luanda and brought up at clubs in the Lisbon Region. In summer 2006 he signed with C.S. Marítimo in the Primeira Liga, his only appearance of the season being on 5 May 2007 in a 0–0 home draw against Académica de Coimbra where he featured 12 minutes.

Campos became an important first-team member for the Madeirans from 2008–09 onwards – even though he played his last game for the reserves in 2010 – scoring six goals in 28 matches in the 2009–10 campaign and forming an efficient attacking partnership with Senegalese Baba Diawara. On 25 October 2009, he netted twice in a 3–1 home win over F.C. Paços de Ferreira.

On 2 May 2011, Campos signed a five-year contract with FC Porto. A reserve in his first year, he made 19 competitive appearances as the northerners won the national championship, scoring his only league goal (three in total) in the last round at Rio Ave FC, a 5–2 victory. His maiden appearance in the UEFA Champions League took place on 13 September 2011, when he featured 22 minutes in the 2–1 home defeat of FC Shakhtar Donetsk in the group stage.

From 2012 to 2016, Campos represented Kasımpaşa SK, Konyaspor and Gençlerbirliği SK, with all the sides competing in the Turkish Süper Lig. On 14 June 2016 he joined PAOK FC in the Super League Greece, on a three-year contract and a €800,000 salary per season. He scored his first goals for his new team on 17 December, a brace in the 5–0 away win against PAE Kerkyra, and added four matches in that season's Greek Cup to help them win the trophy for the fifth time.

Campos helped PAOK to retain their supremacy in the domestic cup, while scoring seven goals in all competitions. He returned to the Turkish top division on 28 June 2018, after agreeing to a three-year contract at Alanyaspor for a €1 million fee.

Campos returned to Portugal subsequently, where he represented top-flight S.C. Farense and second-tier C.D. Trofense.

== International career ==
Campos received his first call-up to the Angola national team in 2008. Following several successful displays for Marítimo, he was selected for the squads at both the 2010 and the 2012 Africa Cup of Nations.

Campos scored his first international goal against Malta in October 2009, in a 2–1 friendly win. His second came in a 2014 FIFA World Cup qualifier against Uganda, on 3 June 2012.

=== International goals ===
Angola score listed first, score column indicates score after each Campos goal.

No.	Date	Venue	Opponent	Score	Result	Competition
1.	10 October 2009	Monte da Forca, Vila Real, Portugal	Malta	1–1	2–1	Friendly
2.	3 June 2012	Estádio 11 de Novembro, Luanda, Angola	Uganda	1–0	1–1	2014 FIFA World Cup qualification
3.	9 September 2012	National Sports Stadium, Harare, Zimbabwe	Zimbabwe	3–1	3–1	2013 Africa Cup of Nations qualification
4.	19 November 2014	Stade Municipal, Ouagadougou, Burkina Faso	Burkina Faso	1–0	1–1	2015 Africa Cup of Nations qualification
5.	21 March 2018	Levy Mwanawasa Stadium, Ndola, Zambia	South Africa	1–0	1–1 (3–5 p)	2018 Four Nations Tournament
6.	24 March 2018	Levy Mwanawasa Stadium, Ndola, Zambia	Zimbabwe	1–0	2–2 (4–2 p)	2018 Four Nations Tournament
7.	12 October 2018	Estádio 11 de Novembro, Luanda, Angola	Mauritania	3–1	4–1	2019 Africa Cup of Nations qualification
8.	24 June 2019	Suez Stadium, Suez, Egypt	Tunisia	1–1	1–1	2019 Africa Cup of Nations

== Honours ==
Porto

- Primeira Liga: 2011–12

PAOK

- Greek Football Cup: 2016–17, 2017–18
