= Stélvio (footballer) =

Angolan footballer

Personal information
- Full name: Stélvio Rosa da Cruz
- Date of birth: 24 January 1989 (age 37)
- Place of birth: Luanda, Angola
- Height: 1.89 m (6 ft 2 in)
- Position: Defensive midfielder

Team information
- Current team: Luxembourg City
- Number: 38

Youth career
- 2000–2007: Braga

Senior career*
Years	Team	Apps	(Gls)
2007–2011	Braga	19	(0)
2009–2010	→ União Leiria (loan)	2	(0)
2010	→ 1º Agosto (loan)		
2011	→ Libolo (loan)		
2012	Caála		
2012–2013	Alki Larnaca	11	(0)
2013–2019	Dudelange	104	(13)
2019–2020	Virton	24	(7)
2020	RWDM	2	(0)
2021–2022	Jeunesse Esch	39	(2)
2022–2024	Mondercange	27	(0)
2024–	Luxembourg City	28	(2)

International career
2007–2009	Portugal U21	11	(0)
2009–2019	Angola	11	(0)
- * Club domestic league appearances and goals as of 13 June 2026

Stélvio Rosa da Cruz (born 24 January 1989), known simply as Stélvio, is an Angolan professional footballer who plays as a defensive midfielder for Luxembourg Division of Honour club Luxembourg City.

== Club career ==
Stélvio was born in Luanda. A product of S.C. Braga's youth academy, he made his Portuguese Primeira Liga debut on 11 November 2007, coming on as a 60th-minute substitute in a 3–0 home win against Sporting CP.

On 4 July 2009, after two seasons in the first team with intermittent use, Stélvio was loaned to U.D. Leiria (recently returned to the top division) in a season-long loan. However, in late January 2010, he moved to his homeland and signed for C.D. Primeiro de Agosto, also on loan.

Stélvio was released by Braga on 31 August 2011. He then joined C.R. Caála, returning to the Angolan Girabola.

In July 2019, after six years in the Luxembourg National Division at the service of F91 Dudelange where he won several team honours, the 30-year-old Stélvio moved to Belgium with R.E. Virton on a one-year contract.

== International career ==
Stélvio represented Portugal at under-21 level. He switched allegiance to his native Angola in 2009, being part of the squad that appeared in the following year's Africa Cup of Nations.

In October 2018, after an absence of eight years, Stélvio was recalled to the national team ahead of a 2019 Africa Cup of Nations qualifier against Mauritania. He was selected for the squad that reached the finals in Egypt by manager Srđan Vasiljević.
