= Christian Nsengi-Biembe =

Congolese football coach (born 1963)

Personal information
- Date of birth: 26 February 1963 (age 63)
- Place of birth: Kinshasa, Democratic Republic of the Congo

Team information
- Current team: South Sudan (manager)

Managerial career
- Years: Team
- 2007: AS Vita Club
- 2011–2012: DR Congo U23
- 2018–2019: DR Congo U23
- 2019–2021: DR Congo
- 2026–: South Sudan

Christian Nsengi-Biembe (born 26 February 1963) is a Congolese football manager, who is the current manager of the South Sudan national football team

== Managerial career ==
During the 2007 Linafoot season, Nsengi-Biembe managed AS Vita Club, without success. Nsengi-Biembe subsequently managed the DR Congo under-23 team, as well as coaching in the youth system at Anderlecht. On 8 August 2019, Nsengi-Biembe was appointed manager of DR Congo, succeeding Florent Ibengé. After the national team of DR Congo failed to qualify for the 2021 Africa Cup of Nations, he was fired.
