= Santos Muntubile =

Democratic Republic of the Congo footballer (born 1958)

Personal information
- Full name: Jean N'Diela Muntubila
- Date of birth: 20 December 1958 (age 67)
- Place of birth: Léopoldville, Belgian Congo
- Height: 1.75 m (5 ft 9 in)
- Position: Midfielder

Senior career*
Years	Team	Apps	(Gls)
1976–1980	AS Bilima Kinshasa		
1980–1984	Sochaux	50	(2)
1981–1982	→ Marseille (loan)	32	(8)
1984–1986	1. FC Saarbrücken	62	(4)
1986–1988	Bastia	51	(10)
1988–1991	Valenciennes	96	(16)
1991–1995	ESA Brive		

International career
1985–1991	Zaire	10	(2)

Managerial career
- 1995: Zaire
- 1996–1997: Zaire
- 2001: DR Congo
- 2013: DR Congo
- * Club domestic league appearances and goals

Jean N'Diela Muntubile (Note: His name is spelled in various ways. It was often written Muntubila during his playing career. More recently, it is sometimes written Muitubile or Mutubile.) (20 December 1958), nicknamed Santos Muntubile, is a Congolese former professional football player and manager.

He played for AS Bilima Kinshasa, FC Sochaux-Montbéliard, Olympique de Marseille, 1. FC Saarbrücken, SC Bastia, US Valenciennes and ESA Brive.
