= Celio Barros =

Brazilian football manager

Personal information
- Place of birth: Brazil

Managerial career
- Years: Team
- -1997: AS Vita Club
- 1997: DR Congo

Celio Barros (born in Brazil) is a Brazilian football manager who last worked as head coach of the DR Congo national football team.

== Career ==
Barros managed AS Vita Club. In 1997, he was appointed head coach of the DR Congo national football team, a position he held until 1997.
