= DR Congo national football team =

Men's association football team

DR Congo
- Nickname(s): Léopards (Leopards); Guerriers de l'Équateur (Warriors of the Equator); La Céleste (The Skyblue)
- Association: Fédération Congolaise de Football-Association (FECOFA)
- Confederation: CAF (Africa)
- Sub-confederation: UNIFFAC (Central Africa)
- Head coach: Sébastien Desabre
- Captain: Chancel Mbemba
- Most caps: Chancel Mbemba (119)
- Top scorer: Dieumerci Mbokani (22)
- Home stadium: Stade des Martyrs
- FIFA code: COD
First colours	Second colours	Third colours

FIFA ranking
- Current: 39 ▲1 (18 November 2026)
- Highest: 28 (July–August 2017)
- Lowest: 133 (October 2011)

First international
- Belgian Congo 3–2 Northern Rhodesia (Belgian Congo; 22 May 1948)

Biggest win
- Congo-Kinshasa 10–1 Zambia (Kinshasa, Congo DR; 22 November 1969)

Biggest defeat
- Yugoslavia 9–0 Zaire (Gelsenkirchen, West Germany; 18 June 1974)

World Cup
- Appearances: 2 (first in 1974)
- Best result: Round of 32 (2026)

Africa Cup of Nations
- Appearances: 21 (first in 1965)
- Best result: Champions (1968, 1974)

African Nations Championship
- Appearances: 5 (first in 2009)
- Best result: Champions (2009, 2016)

COSAFA Cup
- Appearances: 1 (first in 2016)
- Best result: Fourth place (2016)

The DR Congo national football team (French: équipe nationale de football de la République démocratique du Congo; Lingala: lisanga ya ndémbô ya Republíki ya Kongó Demokratíki), recognised by FIFA as Congo DR and by CAF as DR Congo, represents the Democratic Republic of the Congo in men's international football. It is controlled by the Congolese Association Football Federation. They are nicknamed Les Léopards, meaning The Leopards. The team is a member of FIFA and the Confederation of African Football (CAF). DR Congo have previously competed variously as Belgian Congo, Congo-Kinshasa and Zaïre.

DR Congo have been ranked as high as 28th in the FIFA Rankings. They won the Africa Cup of Nations twice (in 1968 as Congo-Kinshasa and in 1974 as Zaire), and were the first Sub-Saharan African team to qualify for the FIFA World Cup, as Zaire in 1974. They are also one of the most successful teams in the African Nations Championship with two titles (2009 and 2016), second only to Morocco with three. They qualified for the World Cup in 2026 as DR Congo, and are currently ranked 40th in the FIFA Rankings (October 2026).

== History ==
=== Early history ===
The Congolese Association Football Federation was founded in 1919 when the country was not yet independent. The team played their first game in 1948 as Belgian Congo against Northern Rhodesia, now Zambia. The team recorded a 3–2 victory at home. DR Congo has been FIFA affiliated since 1962 and has been a member of CAF since 1963. The team's first official match was on 11 April 1963, against Mauritania in the L'Amitié Tournament played in Dakar, Senegal. DR Congo won the match 6–0. The national team appeared in the Africa Cup of Nations for the first time in 1965.

=== First World Cup appearance ===
The Democratic Republic of the Congo had its first international success at the 1968 African Cup of Nations held in Ethiopia, beating Ghana 1–0 in the final. The team's biggest ever win came on 22 November 1969 when they recorded a 10–1 home victory against Zambia. Although a handful of Congolese players were playing in Europe (particularly Belgium) during these years, foreign-based players were seldom recalled for international duty; a rare exception was Julien Kialunda who represented Zaire (as the country was by then known) at the 1972 African Cup of Nations while playing for Anderlecht.

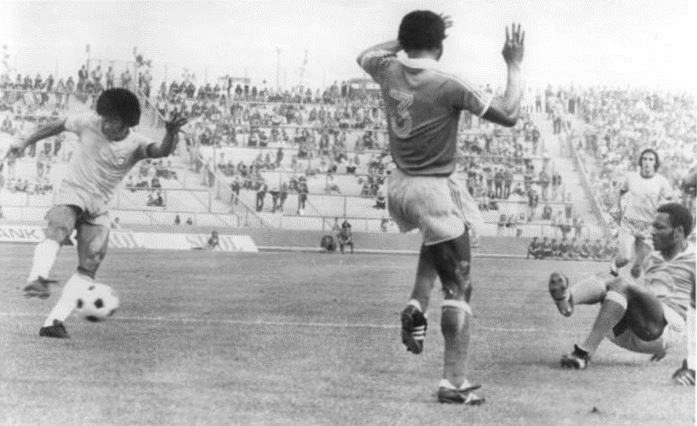
Zaire versus Brazil in the 1974 World Cup

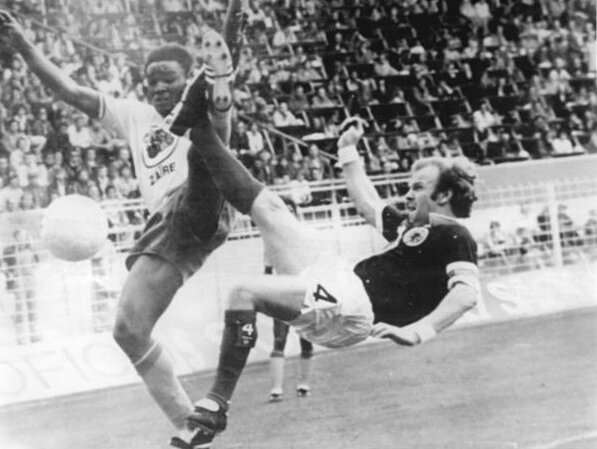
Zaire versus Scotland in 1974 World Cup

The second continental title came at the 1974 African Cup of Nations in Egypt. The Leopards recorded a 2–1 victory against Guinea, another 2–1 victory against rivals Congo and a 4–1 victory against Mauritius. These results carried Zaire through to the semi-finals where they beat hosts Egypt 3–2. In the final, Zaire drew with Zambia 2–2. Therefore, the match was replayed two days later, where Zaire won the game 2–0. Zaire player Ndaye Mulamba was top scorer with nine goals, which remains a record for the tournament. After this, the team returned to Zaire on the Presidential plane, lent to them by Mobutu Sese Seko.

Zaire were the first Sub-Saharan African team to participate in a World Cup, qualifying for the 1974 tournament in place of the 1970 participant Morocco, whom they defeated in the decisive qualifier 3–0 in Kinshasa. Such was the desire to foster an identity of Zaire as a global player that Mobutu paid for advertising hoardings at the World Cup to display messages such as ‘Zaire-Peace’ and ‘Go to Zaire’. After their qualification for the World Cup, Mobutu invited the Zaire squad to his palace in Gbadolite, where he promised them cash and other gifts if they did well.

At the tournament itself, Zaire did not manage to score any goals and lost all of its games, but gave credible performances against Scotland and Brazil. However, the team's morale was low because they did not receive the resources they were promised, and had problems involving their Yugoslav coach, Blagoje Vidinić. Their match against Yugoslavia became a 9–0 loss, and remains one of the worst World Cup defeats. The Zaire team was threatened by their government that they would face consequences if they were to have a loss against Brazil by more than 3–0. A bizarre moment came in the match versus Brazil; facing a free-kick 25 yards out, defender Mwepu Ilunga, upon hearing the referee blow his whistle, ran out of the Zaire wall and kicked the ball upfield, for which he received a yellow card. This was voted the 17th greatest World Cup moment in a Channel 4 poll. Ilunga has stated that he was quite aware of the rules and was hoping to convince the referee to send him off. The intended red card would have been a protest against his country's authorities, who were alleged to be depriving the players of their earnings. Many contemporary commentators instead held it to be an example of African football's "naïvety and indiscipline".

Pos	Team	Pld	W	D	L	GF	GA	GD	Pts	Qualification
1	Yugoslavia	3	1	2	0	10	1	+9	4	Advance to second round
2	Brazil	3	1	2	0	3	0	+3	4	Advance to second round
3	Scotland	3	1	2	0	3	1	+2	4	
4	Zaire	3	0	0	3	0	14	−14	0	

Source: FIFA

=== Crisis period ===
After winning the 1974 African Cup of Nations and participating in the 1974 World Cup, the team was eliminated in the first round of the 1976 African Cup of Nations after recording a draw and two losses in the group stage. Morocco went on to win the tournament. From 1978 to 1986, the country did not qualify for the African Cup of Nations, while not participating in qualification for the 1978 World Cup and 1986 World Cup. In the 1988 African Cup of Nations, Zaire finished last in their group despite having two draws.

=== Return to success ===
From 1992 to 1996, Zaire reached three consecutive African Cup of Nations quarter-finals. In 1992 and 1994, they were beaten by Nigeria, and in 1996 they were beaten by Ghana. In 1997, the country returned to its former name of Democratic Republic of the Congo, and the national team was re-branded as the Simbas, a nickname that stuck for the next nine years. DR Congo played their first game on 8 June 1997 in Pointe-Noire which ended in a 1–0 loss to the Republic of the Congo. At the 1998 African Cup of Nations, DR Congo, led by Louis Watunda, surprisingly took third place, beating Cameroon in the quarter-finals and hosts Burkina Faso 4–1 on penalties in their last match after scoring three late goals to tie the encounter 4–4.

At the 2000 African Cup of Nations, the team finished third in their group, and in 2002 were eliminated in the quarter-finals by Senegal. Then, in 2004, DR Congo were eliminated after three straight defeats in the group stages. In 2006, led by Claude Le Roy, having finished second in the group behind Cameroon, the Congolese were eliminated in the quarter-finals by Egypt 4–1.

=== Struggles ===
DR Congo were drawn in group 10 for qualifications for the 2008 African Cup of Nations, along with Libya, Namibia and Ethiopia. Before the last match day, the Congolese led the group, but they drew 1–1 with Libya in their final match while Namibia beat Ethiopia 3–2. This sent Namibia through to the Finals, while the Leopards were eliminated. DR Congo also failed to qualify for the 2010 World Cup. In 2009, DR Congo won the 2009 African Championship of Nations, a competition reserved to players in domestic leagues, a tournament they would again win in 2016. DR Congo reached the 2013 Africa Cup of Nations finals in South Africa but were knocked out in the group stages after drawing all three matches.

=== Rise and near World Cup miss ===
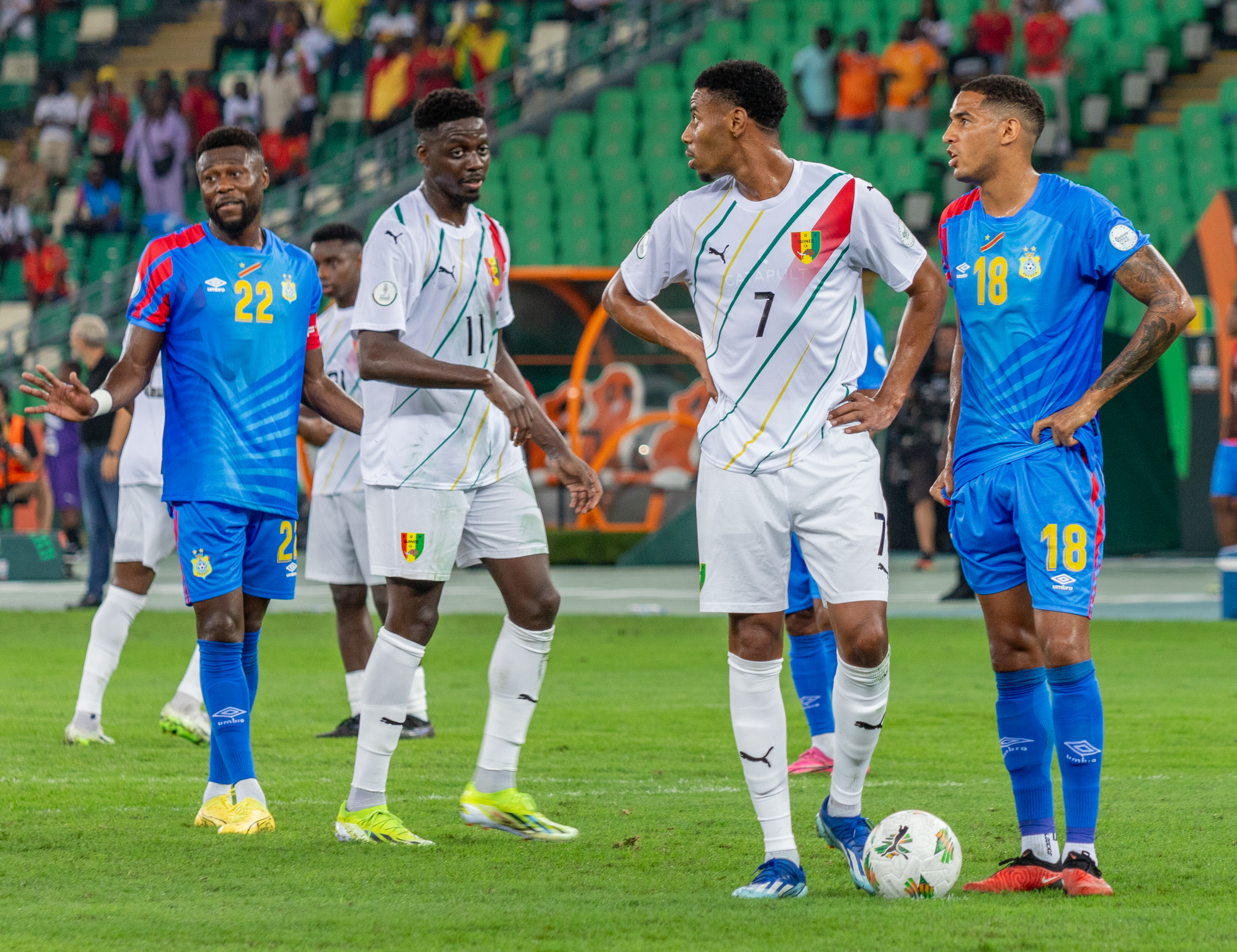
DR Congo versus Guinea in 2023

In the 2015 Africa Cup of Nations, DR Congo again drew all three group matches but this time finished second in the group behind Tunisia, and therefore advanced to the quarter-finals to play their rivals Congo (Republic), a match in which the Leopards came from two goals down to win 4–2. However, they were knocked out by the Ivory Coast 3–1 in the semi-finals. They ended up finishing third, beating Equatorial Guinea on penalties, after the third place match finished 0–0 in regulation time.

DR Congo under Ibengé improved radically and had an outstanding performance for many decades in a World Cup qualification. During the 2018 FIFA World Cup qualification, DR Congo was grouped with Libya, Tunisia and Guinea. DR Congo managed an outstanding performance, beating Libya and Guinea home and away, but missed the chance after losing 1–2 to eventual World Cup qualifier Tunisia in Tunis and drew 2–2 at home to the same opponent.

=== Second World Cup appearance ===
DR Congo finished second behind Senegal in the 2026 World Cup qualification Group B, before defeating both Cameroon and Nigeria in the second round. In the inter-confederation play-offs, they secured a 1–0 extra-time victory over Jamaica to qualify for the 2026 FIFA World Cup, marking their second World Cup appearance after 1974. The day after, the authorities announced a public holiday in the country for people to celebrate the achievement. On 17 June 2026, during the group-stage, Yoane Wissa scored the country's first ever World Cup goal against Portugal in Houston in an unexpected 1–1 draw, also claiming the country's first ever point in the tournament. On 27 June, DR Congo qualified for the knockout stage for the first time after achieving their first World Cup victory, a 3–1 win over Uzbekistan, in Atlanta. Yoane Wissa and Fiston Mayele scored goals against Uzbekistan.

Pos	Team	Pld	W	D	L	GF	GA	GD	Pts	Qualification
1	Colombia	3	2	1	0	4	1	+3	7	Advance to knockout stage
2	Portugal	3	1	2	0	6	1	+5	5	Advance to knockout stage
3	DR Congo	3	1	1	1	4	3	+1	4	Advance to knockout stage
4	Uzbekistan	3	0	0	3	2	11	−9	0	

Source: FIFA

On 1 July 2026, during the round of 32, DR Congo lost to England in 2–1 match in Atlanta, after shockingly leading during the first half of the game thanks to a goal by Brian Cipenga seven minutes into the match. Yoane Wissa took another shot at 42 minutes, which would have doubled the lead for DR Congo, but the ball hit the right side goalpost. Goalkeeper Lionel Mpasi made multiple saves during the match, including two against England's Jude Bellingham, but at 75 minutes Harry Kane scored a goal, and followed it up with another one at 86 minutes, which, ultimately, gave England the 2-1 victory.

== Home stadium ==
Stade des Martyrs has been the home of the national team since its establishment and they occasionally play their games at Lubumbashi.

== Results and fixtures ==
The following is a list of match results in the last 12 months, as well as any future matches that have been scheduled.

Win Draw Loss Fixture

=== 2025 ===
16 December Friendly	Zambia	0–2	DR Congo	Murcia, Spain
16:00 UTC+1		Report	Masuaku 21'; Bushiri 72'	Stadium: Pinatar Arena; Referee: Javier Alberola Rojas (Spain)

23 December 2025 AFCON GS	DR Congo	1–0	Benin	Rabat, Morocco
13:30 UTC+1	Bongonda 16'	Report		Stadium: Al Barid Stadium; Attendance: 13,073; Referee: Abongile Tom (South Africa)

27 December 2025 AFCON GS	Senegal	1–1	DR Congo	Tangier, Morocco
16:00 UTC+1	Mané 69'	Report	Bakambu 61'	Stadium: Ibn Batouta Stadium; Attendance: 41,672; Referee: Lahlou Benbraham (Algeria)

30 December 2025 AFCON GS	Botswana	0–3	DR Congo	Rabat, Morocco
20:00 UTC+1		Report	Mbuku 31'; Kakuta 41' (pen.), 60'	Stadium: Al Barid Stadium; Attendance: 12,569; Referee: Ahmad Heeralall (Mauritius)

=== 2026 ===
6 January 2025 AFCON R16	Algeria	1–0 (a.e.t.)	DR Congo	Rabat, Morocco
17:00 UTC+1	Boulbina 119'	Report		Stadium: Moulay Hassan Stadium; Attendance: 18,837; Referee: Mahmoud Mansour (Egypt)

25 March Friendly	DR Congo	2–0	Bermuda	Guadalajara, Mexico
15:00 UTC−6	Mayele 45'; Wissa 51' (pen.)	Report		Stadium: Estadio Akron; Referee: Daniel Quintero (Mexico)

31 March 2026 World Cup inter-confederation play-offs	DR Congo	1–0 (a.e.t.)	Jamaica	Guadalajara, Mexico
15:00 UTC−6	Tuanzebe 100'	Report		Stadium: Estadio Akron; Attendance: 39,983; Referee: Facundo Tello (Argentina) (Note: Tello suffered an injury in the 114th minute and was replaced by fourth official Darío Herrera (Argentina).)

3 June Friendly	Denmark	0–0	DR Congo	Liège, Belgium
19:00 UTC−2		Report		Stadium: Stade Maurice Dufrasne; Attendance: 23,043; Referee: Lothar D'Hondt (Belgium)

9 June Friendly	DR Congo	1–2	Chile	Orléans, France
18:00 UTC+2	Kayembe 88'	Report	Osorio 51'; Sepúlveda 86'	Stadium: Stade de la Source; Attendance: 0 (Behind closed doors); Referee: Mehrez Melki (Tunisia)
Note: Originally, Match cancelled due to La Línea de la Concepción's mayoral ban related to the 2026 Central Africa Ebola epidemic, but relocated to Orléans.

17 June 2026 World Cup GS	Portugal	1–1	DR Congo	Houston, Texas, United States
12:00 UTC−5	J. Neves 6'	Report	Wissa 45+5'	Stadium: NRG Stadium; Attendance: 68,777; Referee: Abdulrahman Al-Jassim (Qatar)

23 June 2026 World Cup GS	Colombia	1–0	DR Congo	Guadalajara, Mexico
20:00 UTC−6	Muñoz 76'	Report		Stadium: Estadio Akron; Attendance: 45,358; Referee: Maurizio Mariani (Italy)

27 June 2026 World Cup GS	DR Congo	3–1	Uzbekistan	Atlanta, Georgia, United States
19:30 UTC−4	Wissa 68' (pen.), 90+1'; Mayele 78'	Report	Shomurodov 10'	Stadium: Mercedes-Benz Stadium; Attendance: 68,239; Referee: Felix Zwayer (Germany)

1 July 2026 World Cup R32	England	2–1	DR Congo	Atlanta, Georgia, United States
12:00 UTC−4	Kane 75', 86'	Report	Cipenga 7'	Stadium: Mercedes-Benz Stadium; Attendance: 68,239; Referee: Adham Makhadmeh (Jordan)

24 September 2027 AFCON qualification	DR Congo	2–0	Equatorial Guinea	Kinshasa, DR Congo
17:00 UTC+1	Mbemba 4'; Wissa 72'	Report		Stadium: Stade des Martyrs; Referee: Joseph Odey Ogabor (Nigeria)

28 September 2027 AFCON qualification	Zimbabwe	1–2	DR Congo	Harare, Zimbabwe
18:00 UTC+2	Munetsi 90+3'	Report	Wissa 30'; Moutoussamy 45+2'	Stadium: National Sports Stadium (Zimbabwe); Referee: Amin Omar (Egypt)

2 October Friendly	DR Congo	0–2	Uganda	Johannesburg, South Africa
		Report	Bogere 7'; Boateng 49'	Stadium: FNB Stadium

5 October Friendly	Uganda	1–1	DR Congo
	Bogere 90+1'		Mbuku 64'

12 November 2027 AFCON qualification	DR Congo	3–1	Sierra Leone	Kinshasa, DR Congo
17:00 UTC+1	Wissa 4'; Moutoussamy 35'; Kayembe 58'	Report	Bekoe 83'	Stadium: Stade des Martyrs; Referee: Peter Waweru (Kenya)

17 November 2027 AFCON qualification	Sierra Leone	1–1	DR Congo	El Jadida, Morocco
16:00 UTC+0	Conteh 90+4'	Report	Kadile 27'	Stadium: Ben M'Hamed El Abdi Stadium; Referee: Jalal Jayed (Morocco)

=== 2027 ===
24 March 2027 AFCON qualification	Equatorial Guinea	v	DR Congo	TBD, Equatorial Guinea
TBD				Stadium: TBD

28 March 2027 AFCON qualification	DR Congo	v	Zimbabwe	TBD, DR Congo
TBD				Stadium: TBD

== Technical staff ==
Position	Staff
Director of football	(Democratic Republic of the Congo) Hérita Ilunga
Sporting director	(Democratic Republic of the Congo) Christian Nsengi-Biembe
Technical director	(Democratic Republic of the Congo) Médard Lusadusu
Head coach	(France) Sébastien Desabre
Assistant coach	(Spain) Rafael Hamidi Cuadros
Goalkeeping coach	(Democratic Republic of the Congo) Robert Kidiaba
Match analyst	(France) Corentin Jourdan
Physiotherapist	(France) Cédric D'Antonio

=== Coaching history ===
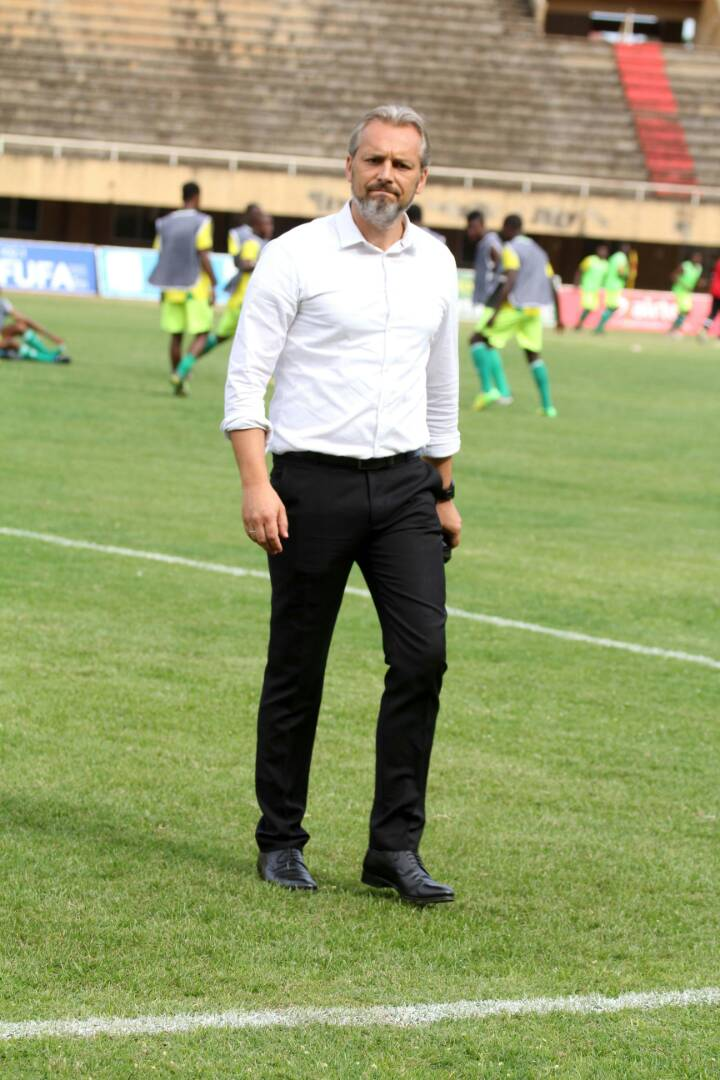
Sébastien Desabre became the manager of the DR Congo national football team in 2022

- (Democratic Republic of the Congo) Léon Mokuna (1965)
- (Hungary) Ferenc Csanádi (1967–1968)
- (Democratic Republic of the Congo) Léon Mokuna (1968–1970)
- (France) André Mori (1970)
- (Socialist Federal Republic of Yugoslavia) Blagoje Vidinić (1970–1974)
- (Romania) Ştefan Stănculescu (1974–1976)
- (Zaire) Julien Kialunda (?–?)
- (West Germany) Otto Pfister (1985–1989)
- (Zaire) Ali Makombo Alamande (1989)
- (Zaire) Pierre Kalala Mukendi (1992–1993)
- (Zaire) Louis Watunda (1993)
- (Zaire) Pierre Kalala Mukendi (1994)
- (Zaire) Jean-Santos Muntubila (1995)
- (Turkey) Muhsin Ertuğral (1995–1996)
- (Zaire) Jean-Santos Muntubila (1996–1997)
- (Mali) Mohamed Magassouba (1997)
- (Brazil) Celio Barros (1997)
- (Democratic Republic of the Congo) Saio Ernest Mokili (1997)
- (Democratic Republic of the Congo) Louis Watunda Iyolo (1998–1999)
- (Democratic Republic of the Congo) Médard Lusadusu Basilwa (1999–2000)
- (Sweden) Roger Palmgren (1999–2000)
- (Mali) Mohamed Magassouba (2000)
- (Democratic Republic of the Congo) Jean-Santos Muntubila (2001)
- (Russia) Yuri Gavrilov (2001)
- (Democratic Republic of the Congo) Eugène Kabongo (2002)
- (Democratic Republic of the Congo) Andy Mfutila (2002–2003)
- (England) Mick Wadsworth (2003–2004)
- (France) Claude Le Roy (2004–2006)
- (Belgium) Henri Depireux (2006–2007)
- (France) Patrice Neveu (2008–2010)
- (France) Robert Nouzaret (2010–2011)
- (France) Claude Le Roy (2011–2013)
- (Democratic Republic of the Congo) Jean-Santos Muntubila (2013–2014)
- (Democratic Republic of the Congo) Florent Ibengé (2014–2019)
- (Democratic Republic of the Congo) Christian Nsengi-Biembe (2019–2021)
- (Argentina) Héctor Cúper (2021–2022)
- (France) Sébastien Desabre (2022–present)

== Players ==
=== Current squad ===
The following players were called up to the 2027 Africa Cup of Nations qualification matches against Sierra Leone in November 2026.

Caps and goals as of 17 November 2026, after the second match against Sierra Leone.

No.	Pos.	Player	Date of birth (age)	Caps	Goals	Club
	GK	Dimitry Bertaud	6 June 1998 (age 28)	16	0	(Canadian Soccer Association) Forge
	GK	Matthieu Epolo	15 January 2005 (age 21)	5	0	(Royal Belgian Football Association) Standard Liège
	GK	Timothy Fayulu	24 July 1999 (age 27)	3	0	(Swiss Football Association) Sion
	DF	Chancel Mbemba (captain)	8 August 1994 (age 32)	115	8	(Saudi Arabian Football Federation) Al-Diriyah
	DF	Arthur Masuaku	7 November 1993 (age 33)	51	4	(Turkish Football Federation) Konyaspor
	DF	Joris Kayembe	8 August 1994 (age 32)	33	1	(Royal Belgian Football Association) Genk
	DF	Gédéon Kalulu	29 August 1997 (age 29)	31	0	(Cyprus Football Association) Aris Limassol
	DF	Axel Tuanzebe	14 November 1997 (age 29)	21	1	(French Football Federation) Auxerre
	DF	Steve Kapuadi	30 April 1998 (age 28)	7	0	(Polish Football Association) Widzew Łódź
	DF	Jordy Makengo	3 August 2001 (age 25)	1	0	(German Football Association) SC Freiburg
	DF	Kévin Pedro	21 February 2006 (age 20)	3	0	(French Football Federation) Saint-Étienne
	DF	Magloire Ntambwe	5 May 1998 (age 28)	0	0	(Congolese Association Football Federation) Mazembe
	MF	Meschak Elia (third captain)	6 August 1997 (age 29)	69	12	(Turkish Football Federation) Alanyaspor
	MF	Samuel Moutoussamy	12 August 1996 (age 30)	66	2	(Hellenic Football Federation) Atromitos
	MF	Edo Kayembe	3 June 1998 (age 28)	49	3	(The Football Association) Watford
	MF	Noah Sadiki	17 December 2004 (age 21)	30	0	(The Football Association) Sunderland
	MF	Nathanaël Mbuku	16 March 2002 (age 24)	28	3	(Royal Belgian Football Association) Sint-Truiden
	MF	Ngal'ayel Mukau	3 November 2004 (age 22)	22	0	(French Football Federation) Lille
	MF	Junior Kadile	16 December 2002 (age 23)	6	1	(French Football Federation) Lens
	MF	Ezechiel Banzuzi	16 February 2005 (age 21)	3	0	(German Football Association) RB Leipzig
	MF	Noah Mbamba	5 January 2005 (age 21)	1	0	(French Football Federation) Lorient
	FW	Cédric Bakambu (vice-captain)	11 April 1991 (age 35)	73	21	Unattached
	FW	Yoane Wissa	3 September 1996 (age 30)	46	14	(The Football Association) Newcastle United
	FW	Fiston Mayele	24 June 1994 (age 32)	39	6	(Libyan Football Federation) Al Ahli Tripoli
	FW	Simon Banza	13 August 1996 (age 30)	19	2	(Hellenic Football Federation) PAOK
	FW	Brian Cipenga	11 March 1998 (age 28)	14	1	(Royal Spanish Football Federation) Almería

=== Recent call-ups ===
The following players have also been called up for DR Congo in the last twelve months and are still eligible to represent.

Pos.	Player	Date of birth (age)	Caps	Goals	Club	Latest call-up
GK	Nathan Ndibu	9 June 2004 (age 22)	0	0	(Democratic Republic of the Congo) Aigles du Congo	v. Uganda, 5 October 2026
GK	Lionel Mpasi	1 August 1994 (age 32)	32	0	(France) Le Havre	2026 FIFA World Cup
DF	Willy Kambwala	25 August 2004 (age 22)	1	0	(Italy) Como	v. Sierra Leone, 11 November 2026 ^{PRE}
DF	Henock Inonga Baka	1 November 1993 (age 33)	28	0	(Morocco) AS FAR	v. Uganda, 5 October 2026
DF	Dylan Batubinsika	15 February 1996 (age 30)	15	1	(Romania) FCSB	v. Uganda, 5 October 2026
DF	Aaron Wan-Bissaka	26 November 1997 (age 28)	18	0	(England) Aston Villa	v. Zimbabwe, 29 September 2026
DF	Rocky Bushiri	30 November 1999 (age 26)	7	1	(Scotland) Hibernian	2026 FIFA World Cup ^{INJ}
DF	Brian Bayeye	30 June 2000 (age 26)	4	0	(Romania) Botoșani	v. Jamaica, 31 March 2026
DF	Jeremy Ngakia	7 September 2000 (age 26)	0	0	(England) Watford	v. Bermuda, 27 March 2026 ^{INJ}
MF	Aaron Tshibola	2 January 1995 (age 31)	19	1	(Scotland) Kilmarnock	v. Uganda, 5 October 2026
MF	Stephy Mavididi	31 May 1998 (age 28)	2	0	(England) Watford	v. Uganda, 5 October 2026
MF	Jorthy Mokio	29 February 2008 (age 18)	2	0	(Netherlands) Ajax	v. Uganda, 5 October 2026
MF	Brandon Ndezi	9 January 2000 (age 26)	1	0	(France) Dijon	v. Uganda, 5 October 2026
MF	Stanis Idumbo	29 June 2005 (age 21)	0	0	(France) Monaco (Note: Monaco is a Monégasque club playing in the French football league system.)	v. Uganda, 5 October 2026
MF	Paris Maghoma	8 May 2001 (age 25)	0	0	(England) Norwich City	v. Uganda, 5 October 2026
MF	Charles Pickel	15 May 1997 (age 29)	36	1	(United Arab Emirates) Sharjah	2026 FIFA World Cup
MF	Grady Diangana	19 April 1998 (age 28)	8	0	(Spain) Elche	v. Jamaica, 31 March 2026
MF	Mario Stroeykens	29 September 2004 (age 22)	0	0	(Belgium) Anderlecht	2025 Africa Cup of Nations ^{INJ}
MF	Warren Bondo	15 September 2003 (age 23)	0	0	(Italy) Milan	2025 Africa Cup of Nations ^{PRE}
FW	Théo Bongonda	20 November 1995 (age 30)	43	7	(Saudi Arabia) Al-Faisaly	v. Uganda, 5 October 2026
FW	Jackson Muleka	4 October 1999 (age 27)	19	3	(Turkey) Konyaspor	v. Uganda, 5 October 2026
FW	Samuel Essende	30 January 1998 (age 28)	12	1	(Switzerland) Young Boys	v. Uganda, 5 October 2026
FW	Afimico Pululu	23 March 1999 (age 27)	1	0	(Saudi Arabia) Al-Hazem	v. Uganda, 5 October 2026
FW	Anthony Musaba	6 December 2000 (age 25)	0	0	(England) Norwich City	v. Uganda, 2 October 2026 ^{INJ}
FW	Michel-Ange Balikwisha	10 May 2001 (age 25)	5	0	(Belgium) Gent	2025 Africa Cup of Nations
^{INJ} Player withdrew from the squad due to an injury.^{PRE} Preliminary squad.^{RET} Player has retired from international football.^{SUS} Suspended from the national team.

== Records ==
As of 17 November 2026
Players in bold are still active with DR Congo.

=== Most appearances ===
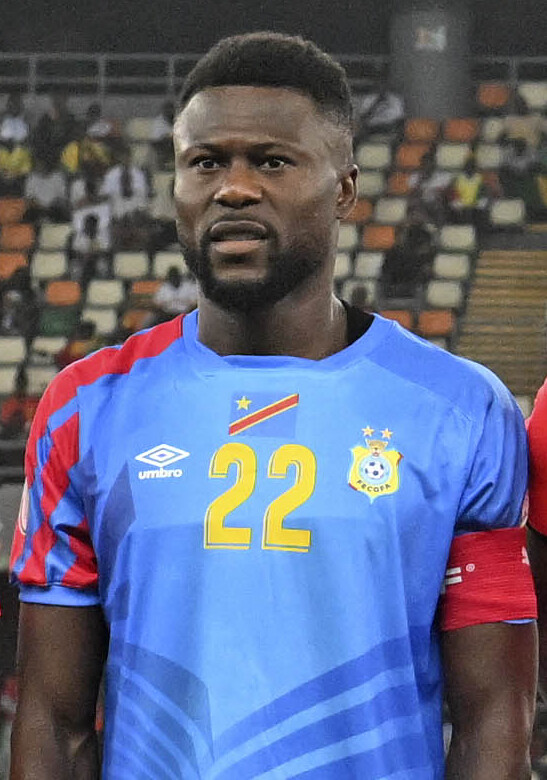
Chancel Mbemba is DR Congo's most capped player with 113 appearances.

Rank	Name	Caps	Goals	Career
1	**Chancel Mbemba**	119	7	2012–present
2	**Cédric Bakambu**	74	21	2015–present
3	**Meschak Elia**	72	12	2016–present
4	Issama Mpeko	70	2	2011–2023
5	**Samuel Moutoussamy**	66	2	2019–present
6	Robert Kidiaba	64	0	2002–2015
7	Zola Matumona	53	9	2002–2014
7	Trésor Mputu	53	14	2004–2021
9	**Arthur Masuaku**	52	4	2018–present
9	Joël Kimwaki	52	3	2009–2016

=== Top goalscorers ===
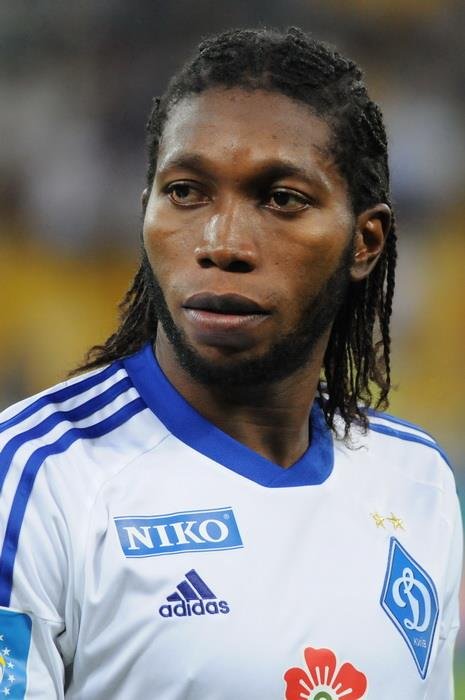
Dieumerci Mbokani is DR Congo's all-time top scorer with 22 goals.

Rank	Name	Goals	Caps	Ratio	Career
1	Dieumerci Mbokani	22	49	0.45	2005–2022
2	**Cédric Bakambu**	21	74	0.28	2015–present
3	**Yoane Wissa**	15	47	0.28	2020–present
4	Shabani Nonda	14	22	0.64	2000–2008
4	Trésor Mputu	14	53	0.26	2004–2021
6	Jean-Jacques Yemweni	12	16	0.75	2000–2007
6	**Meschak Elia**	12	72	0.17	2016–present
8	Ngoy Kabongo	11	22	0.5	1981–1991
9	Ndaye Mulamba	10	20	0.5	1973–1976
10	Kakoko Etepé	9	31	0.29	1970–1976
10	Dioko Kaluyituka	9	31	0.29	2004–2013
10	Jonathan Bolingi	9	34	0.26	2014–2022
10	Ndombe Mubele	9	45	0.2	2013–2018
10	Yannick Bolasie	9	50	0.18	2013–2022
10	Zola Matumona	9	53	0.17	2002–2014

== Competitive record ==
=== FIFA World Cup ===
FIFA World Cup record									Qualification record					
Year	Round	Position	Pld	W	D*	L	GF	GA	Pld	W	D	L	GF	GA
as Belgian Congo and Congo-Léopoldville									as Belgian Congo and Congo-Léopoldville					
1930 to 1962	Not a FIFA member								Not a FIFA member					
as Congo-Kinshasa									as Congo-Kinshasa					
(England) 1966	Did not enter								Did not enter					
as Zaire									as Zaire					
(Mexico) 1970	Entry not accepted by FIFA								Entry not accepted by FIFA					
(West Germany) 1974	Group stage	16th	3	0	0	3	0	14	11	8	1	2	20	4
(Argentina) 1978	Withdrew								Withdrew					
(Spain) 1982	Did not qualify								6	4	1	1	13	12
(Mexico) 1986	Banned								Banned					
(Italy) 1990	Did not qualify								6	2	2	2	7	7
(United States) 1994	Did not qualify								3	0	1	2	1	3
(France) 1998	Interrupted; became DR Congo during the qualification process								6	2	2	2	11	7
as (Democratic Republic of the Congo) (Democratic Republic of the Congo) DR Congo									as (Democratic Republic of the Congo) (Democratic Republic of the Congo) DR Congo					
(France) 1998	Did not qualify								2	0	0	2	0	3
(South Korea) (Japan) 2002	Did not qualify								10	4	2	4	17	18
(Germany) 2006	Did not qualify								10	4	4	2	14	10
(South Africa) 2010	Did not qualify								6	3	0	3	14	6
(Brazil) 2014	Did not qualify								8	3	3	2	11	5
(Russia) 2018	Did not qualify								8	6	1	1	20	9
(Qatar) 2022	Did not qualify								8	3	3	2	11	8
(Canada) (Mexico) (United States) 2026	Round of 32	23rd	4	1	1	2	5	5	13	9	2	2	18	7
(Morocco) (Portugal) (Spain) 2030	To be determined								To be determined					
(Saudi Arabia) 2034	To be determined								To be determined					
Total:2/23	Round of 32	16th	7	1	1	5	5	19	98	48	22	27	157	99

=== Africa Cup of Nations ===
Africa Cup of Nations record									Qualification record					
Year	Round	Position	Pld	W	D	L	GF	GA	Pld	W	D	L	GF	GA
(Sudan) 1957	Part of Belgium								Part of Belgium					
(Egypt) 1959	Part of Belgium								Part of Belgium					
(Ethiopia) 1962	Not affiliated to CAF								Not affiliated to CAF					
(Ghana) 1963	Not affiliated to CAF								Not affiliated to CAF					
Played as Congo-Léopoldville									Played as Congo-Léopoldville					
(Tunisia) 1965	Group stage	5th	2	0	0	2	2	8	4	2	0	2	8	8
Played as Congo-Kinshasa									Played as Congo-Kinshasa					
(Ethiopia) 1968	Champions	1st	5	4	0	1	10	5	5	4	0	1	7	4
(Sudan) 1970	Group stage	7th	3	0	1	2	2	5	Qualified as defending champions					
Played as Zaire									Played as Zaire					
(Cameroon) 1972	Fourth place	4th	5	1	2	2	9	11	4	4	0	0	9	3
(Egypt) 1974	Champions	1st	6	4	1	1	14	8	4	3	0	1	12	3
(Ethiopia) 1976	Group stage	7th	3	0	1	2	3	6	Qualified as defending champions					
(Ghana) 1978	Did not enter								Did not enter					
(Nigeria) 1980	Did not qualify								4	3	0	1	10	10
(Libya) 1982	Did not qualify								4	2	0	2	8	9
(Ivory Coast) 1984	Withdrew								Withdrew					
(Egypt) 1986	Did not qualify								6	2	3	1	8	4
(Morocco) 1988	Group stage	7th	3	0	2	1	2	3	4	1	3	0	3	1
(Algeria) 1990	Did not qualify								2	0	1	1	0	2
(Senegal) 1992	Quarter-finals	6th	3	0	2	1	2	3	6	3	1	2	6	4
(Tunisia) 1994	Quarter-finals	7th	3	1	1	1	2	3	6	3	2	1	13	3
(South Africa) 1996	Quarter-finals	8th	3	1	0	2	2	3	6	3	1	2	10	5
Played as (Democratic Republic of the Congo) / (Democratic Republic of the Congo) / (Democratic Republic of the Congo) DR Congo									Played as (Democratic Republic of the Congo) / (Democratic Republic of the Congo) / (Democratic Republic of the Congo) DR Congo					
(Burkina Faso) 1998	Third place	3rd	6	3	1	2	10	9	6	2	3	1	6	5
(Ghana) (Nigeria) 2000	Group stage	12th	3	0	2	1	0	1	6	3	1	2	7	6
(Mali) 2002	Quarter-finals	6th	4	1	1	2	3	4	8	3	3	2	13	10
(Tunisia) 2004	Group stage	15th	3	0	0	3	1	6	6	3	2	1	9	5
(Egypt) 2006	Quarter-finals	8th	4	1	1	2	3	6	10	4	4	2	14	10
(Ghana) 2008	Did not qualify								6	3	2	1	14	10
(Angola) 2010	Did not qualify								6	3	0	3	14	6
(Equatorial Guinea) (Gabon) 2012	Did not qualify								6	2	3	1	11	10
(South Africa) 2013	Group stage	10th	3	0	3	0	3	3	4	4	0	0	12	5
(Equatorial Guinea) 2015	Third place	3rd	6	1	4	1	7	7	6	3	0	3	10	9
(Gabon) 2017	Quarter-finals	6th	4	2	1	1	7	5	6	5	0	1	16	6
(Egypt) 2019	Round of 16	14th	4	1	1	2	6	6	6	2	3	1	8	6
(Cameroon) 2021	Did not qualify								6	2	3	1	4	5
(Ivory Coast) 2023	Fourth place	4th	7	1	5	1	6	5	6	4	0	2	11	4
(Morocco) 2025	Round of 16	9th	4	2	1	1	5	2	6	4	0	2	7	3
(Kenya) (Tanzania) (Uganda) 2027	To be determined								To be determined					
2028	To be determined								To be determined					
Total	2 Titles	21/35	84	23	30	31	99	109	149	77	35	37	250	156

=== African Nations Championship ===
African Nations Championship record									Qualification record					
Year	Round	Position	Pld	W	D	L	GF	GA	Pld	W	D	L	GF	GA
(Ivory Coast) 2009	Champions	1st	5	3	1	1	7	5	4	3	0	1	7	2
(Sudan) 2011	Quarter-finals	8th	4	1	1	2	3	5	2	1	1	0	3	2
(South Africa) 2014	Quarter-finals	7th	4	2	0	2	3	3	2	1	1	0	2	2
(Rwanda) 2016	Champions	1st	6	4	1	1	14	7	DR Congo qualified by walkover.					
(Morocco) 2018	Did not qualify								2	0	2	0	1	1
(Cameroon) 2020	Quarter-finals	5th	4	2	1	1	5	4	2	2	0	0	6	1
(Algeria) 2022	Group stage	11th	3	0	2	1	0	3	2	2	0	0	7	1
(Kenya) (Tanzania) (Uganda) 2024	Group stage	11th	4	2	0	2	5	4	2	1	1	0	4	2
Total	2 titles	7/8	27	14	4	9	37	28	14	8	5	1	23	10

=== African Games ===
African Games record
Year	Result	Pld	W	D	L	GF	GA
(Republic of the Congo) 1965	5th	5	3	1	1	20	8
1973–1987	Did not enter						
1991–2015	See DR Congo national under-23 football team						
2015–present	See DR Congo national under-20 football team						
Total	1/4	5	3	1	1	20	8

== Head-to-head record ==
Including the record of Uganda. Updated as for 5 October 2026.

Opponent	P	W	D	L	GF	GA	W%	L%
Algeria	7	0	4	3	4	10	0	42.86
Angola	17	8	5	4	22	13	47.06	23.53
Bahrain	1	0	0	1	0	1	0	100
Benin	5	4	1	0	11	4	80	0
Botswana	6	3	3	0	7	0	50	0
Bermuda	1	1	0	0	2	0	100	0
Brazil	1	0	0	1	0	3	0	100
Burkina Faso (Note: Includes the results of Upper Volta.)	13	5	2	6	23	21	38.46	46.15
Burundi	4	4	0	0	9	3	100	0
Cameroon	37	12	7	18	33	46	32.43	48.65
Cape Verde	3	1	2	0	3	2	33.33	0
Central African Republic	7	5	1	1	18	5	71.43	14.29
Chad	1	1	0	0	4	0	100	0
Chile	1	0	0	1	1	2	0	100
Congo	38	18	12	8	66	38	47.37	21.05
Colombia	1	0	0	1	0	1	0	100
Denmark	1	0	1	0	0	0	33.33	33.33
Djibouti	4	3	1	0	21	3	75	0
Egypt	14	1	5	8	15	27	7.14	57.14
England	1	0	0	1	1	2	0	100
Equatorial Guinea	4	2	1	1	7	2	50	25
Eswatini	7	3	1	3	11	6	62.5	12.5
Ethiopia	8	6	0	2	14	6	75	25
Gabon	19	6	8	5	16	16	31.58	26.32
Gambia	3	1	1	1	3	5	33.33	33.33
Ghana	24	5	6	13	23	40	20.83	54.17
Guinea	15	6	2	5	15	11	40	33.33
Iraq	2	0	0	2	1	3	0	100
Ivory Coast	20	5	6	9	27	34	25	45
Jamaica	1	1	0	0	1	0	100	0
Kenya	12	6	2	4	16	13	50	33.33
Lesotho	7	3	4	0	17	4	42.86	0
Liberia	9	4	2	3	15	10	44.44	33.33
Libya	12	5	5	2	19	11	41.67	16.67
Madagascar	15	8	3	4	30	16	53.33	26.67
Malawi	7	4	2	1	9	6	57.14	14.29
Mali	12	3	4	5	15	18	25	41.67
Mauritania	6	6	0	0	17	1	100	0
Mauritius	5	5	0	0	16	3	100	0
Mexico	1	0	0	1	1	2	0	100
Morocco	17	3	9	5	14	20	17.65	29.41
Mozambique	7	5	2	0	15	7	71.43	0
Namibia	3	1	1	1	4	7	33.33	33.33
New Zealand	2	0	2	0	2	2	0	0
Niger	3	1	1	1	3	3	33.33	33.33
Nigeria	10	4	1	5	16	16	40	50
North Korea	1	0	1	0	0	0	0	0
Oman	1	0	1	0	2	2	0	0
Portugal	1	0	1	0	1	1	0	0
Qatar	1	0	1	0	2	2	0	0
Romania	2	0	2	0	2	2	0	0
Rwanda	5	2	0	3	10	7	40	60
Saudi Arabia	1	0	0	1	0	2	0	100
Scotland	1	0	0	1	0	2	0	100
Senegal	15	3	5	7	16	22	20	46.67
Seychelles	2	2	0	0	7	0	100	0
Sierra Leone	3	3	0	0	8	1	100	0
South Africa	9	1	2	6	5	10	11.11	66.67
South Sudan	2	2	0	0	5	1	100	0
Sudan	13	8	2	3	21	11	61.54	23.08
Tanzania	18	7	8	3	17	11	38.89	16.67
Togo	18	14	3	1	42	11	77.78	5.56
Tunisia	20	5	4	11	17	27	25	55
Uganda	18	9	3	6	30	13	50	33.33
Uzbekistan	1	1	0	0	3	1	100	0
Yugoslavia	1	0	0	1	0	9	0	100
Zambia	28	9	12	7	45	35	33.33	25.93
Zimbabwe	9	4	2	3	19	11	44.44	33.33

== Honours ==
=== Continental ===
- CAF African Cup of Nations
  - Champions (2): 1968, 1974
  - Third place (2): 1998, 2015
- CAF African Nations Championship
  - Champions (2): 2009, 2016

=== Regional ===
- Central African Games
  - (gold) Gold medal (1): 1981

=== Awards ===
- Africa Cup of Nations Fair Play Award (1): 2015

=== Summary ===
Competition	1st place, gold medalist(s)	2nd place, silver medalist(s)	3rd place, bronze medalist(s)	Total
CAF African Cup of Nations	2	0	2	4
CAF African Nations Championship	2	0	0	2
Total	4	0	2	6

== Gestures and celebrations of the national team ==
Fimbu

The term means "whip" in Lingala, this gesture came from the song Fimbu by artist Felix Wazekwa. It is a goal celebrations and an iconic cultural dance from the Country. The gesture simulates the act of whippings or lashing. Players line up, hold an imaginary whip, and make rapid arm movements, simulating "punishing" the opponent with lashes in a coreographed manner. How it began: it gained prominence during the 2017 Africa Cup of Nations popularized by players such as Firmin Mubele and Junior Kabananga. It became the trademark celebrations for the Leopards victories most recently seen following Yoane Wissa's equalizer against Portugal.
