= Andy Mfutila =

Democratic Republic of the Congo football manager (born 1978)

Personal information
- Full name: Andy Magloire Mfutila
- Place of birth: Democratic Republic of the Congo
- Date of death: 2023
- Place of death: Democratic Republic of the Congo

Managerial career
- Years: Team
- 2002–2003: Democratic Republic of the Congo
- 2006–2008: APR FC
- 2009–2010: FC Saint-Éloi Lupopo
- 2013–2014: CS Don Bosco
- 2014: Blessing FC
- 2015: Rayon Sports FC

Andy Magloire Mfutila (died 2023) was a Democratic Republic of the Congo football manager.

== Early life ==
Mfutila was a footballer. He attended school in Lubumbashi, Democratic Republic of the Congo.

== Career ==
Mfutila managed Democratic Republic of the Congo side FC Saint-Éloi Lupopo. He was described as "established himself as the man of the club's rebirth upon his arrival... managed to leave his mark... scoring several victories including one against DCMP in Kinshasa".

== Personal life ==
Mfutila died in 2023 in the Democratic Republic of the Congo. He was a native of Kimvula, Democratic Republic of the Congo.
