= Diadié Diarra =

Mauritanian footballer (born 1993)

Personal information
- Date of birth: 23 January 1993 (age 33)
- Place of birth: Paris, France
- Height: 1.80 m (5 ft 11 in)
- Position: Centre back

Team information
- Current team: Lyon La Duchère
- Number: 17

Senior career*
| Years | Team | Apps | (Gls) |
| 2010–2011 | Mantes | 7 | (0) |
| 2011–2013 | Valenciennes B | 30 | (1) |
| 2013–2014 | AC Amiens | 19 | (1) |
| 2014–2015 | Épernay Champagne | 14 | (0) |
| 2015–2016 | Auxerre B | 22 | (0) |
| 2016–2017 | Gueugnon | 20 | (3) |
| 2017–2018 | Stade Bordelais | 3 | (0) |
| 2018 | Amiens | 9 | (0) |
| 2018–2020 | Sedan | 17 | (1) |
| 2020–2021 | Canet Roussillon | 6 | (1) |
| 2021–2022 | GOAL FC | 20 | (1) |
| 2022– | Lyon La Duchère | 1 | (1) |

International career^{‡}
| 2017– | Mauritania | 6 | (0) |
- * Club domestic league appearances and goals as of 22 August 2022 ‡ National team caps and goals as of 15:07, 2 August 2019 (UTC)

Diadié Diarra (born 23 January 1993) is a professional footballer who plays for Lyon La Duchère as a defender. Born in France, he represents Mauritania at international level.

== Career ==
Born in Paris, France, Diarra has played for Mantes, Valenciennes B, Amiens, Épernay Champagne, Auxerre B, Gueugnon, Stade Bordelais, Sedan, Canet Roussillon and GOAL FC.

He made his international debut for Mauritania in 2017.
