= Ibréhima Coulibaly =

French-born Mauritanian footballer (born 1989)

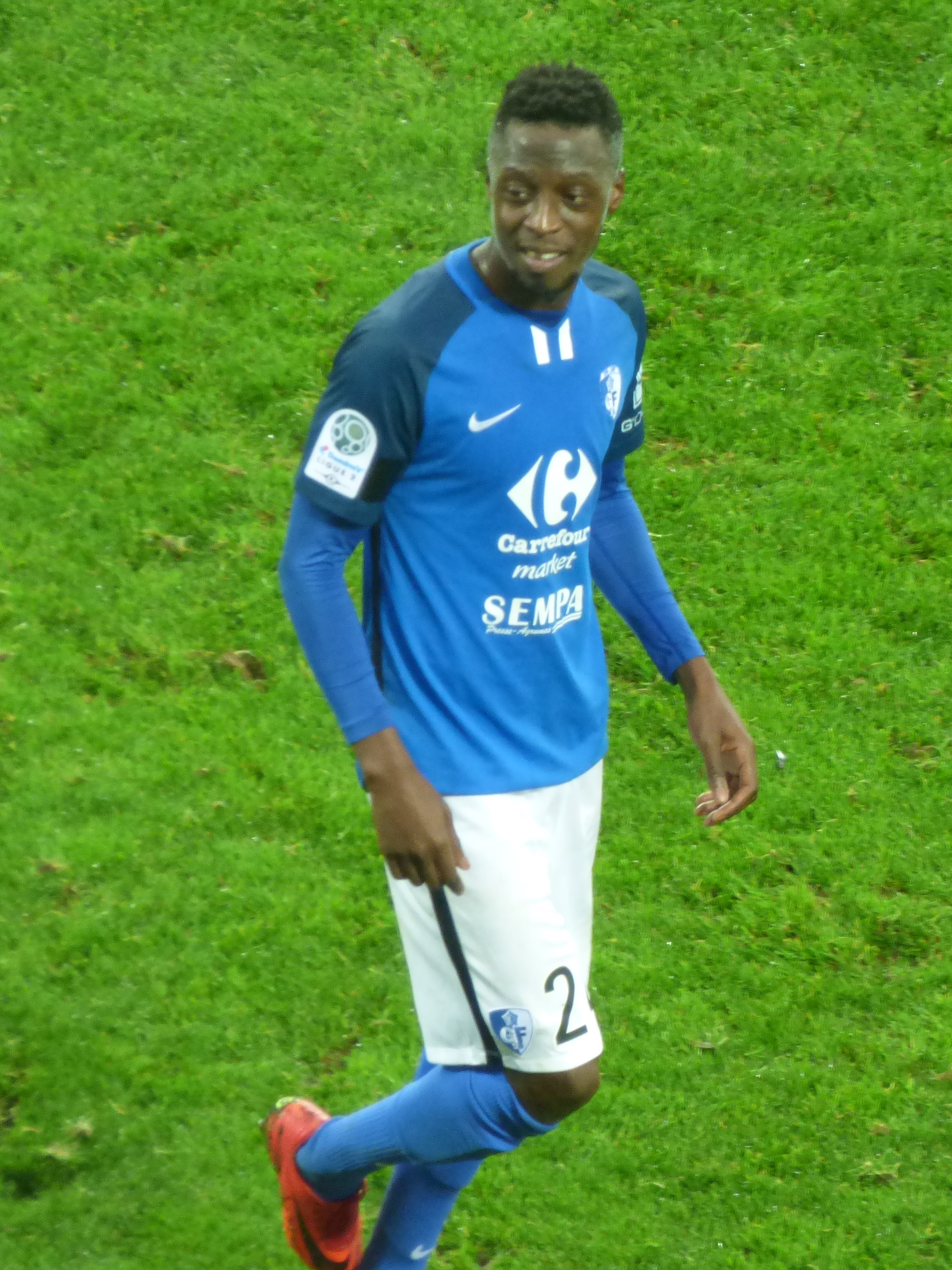
- Coulibaly with Grenoble in 2018

Personal information
- Full name: Ibréhima Coulibaly
- Date of birth: 30 August 1989 (age 37)
- Place of birth: Créteil, France
- Height: 1.83 m (6 ft 0 in)
- Position: Midfielder

Team information
- Current team: Haguenau

Youth career
- 1994–2011: CO Les Ulis

Senior career*
Years	Team	Apps	(Gls)
2011–2014	Orléans	38	(2)
2014–2016	Dunkerque	55	(3)
2016–2020	Grenoble	87	(2)
2020–2022	Le Mans	38	(0)
2022–2024	Nouadhibou		
2024	Saran	6	(1)
2024–	Haguenau	0	(0)

International career
2019–2022	Mauritania	16	(0)
- * Club domestic league appearances and goals as of 30 November 2024

Ibréhima Coulibaly (born 30 August 1989) is a professional footballer who plays as a midfielder for Championnat National 1 club Haguenau. Born in France, he represents Mauritania internationally.

== Club career ==
Coulibaly spent his whole youth career with the CO Les Ulis youth academy, before joining Orléans at the age of 21. He joined USL Dunkerque in 2014 and then moved to Grenoble Foot 38 in 2016. He signed his first professional contract on 2 July 2018 with Grenbole. His professional debut for the club came in a 1–0 Ligue 2 win over FC Sochaux-Montbéliard on 27 July 2018.

In June 2020, Coulibaly joined Le Mans. He left the club in the summer 2022. At the end of October 2022, Coulibaly moved to his native country, Mauritania, to play for FC Nouadhibou.

== International career ==
Born in France, Coulibaly is of Mauritanian descent. He made his debut for the Mauritania national football team on 26 March 2019, in a friendly against Ghana.

He played for the national team at the African Cup of Nations 2019, the first international tournament of the team

== Career statistics ==
=== International ===
Appearances and goals by national team and year
National team	Year	Apps	Goals
Mauritania	2019	7	0
Mauritania	2020	–	
Mauritania	2021	6	0
Mauritania	2022	3	0
Total		16	0
