= Moustapha Diaw =

Mauritanian footballer

Personal information
- Full name: El Moustapha Diaw
- Date of birth: 31 December 1996 (age 29)
- Place of birth: Nouakchott, Mauritania
- Height: 1.60 m (5 ft 3 in)
- Position: Defender

Team information
- Current team: Nouadhibou

Youth career
- –2014: ASAC Concorde

Senior career*
Years	Team	Apps	(Gls)
2014–2017	ASAC Concorde		
2016	→ Fanja (loan)		
2017–2019	Tevragh-Zeina		
2019	Dnyapro Mogilev	3	(0)
2020–2021	Nouadhibou		
2021–2022	Manama Club		
2022–	Nouadhibou		

International career^{‡}
2015–	Mauritania	35	(1)
- * Club domestic league appearances and goals as of 31 December 2019 ‡ National team caps and goals as of 15 October 2019

El Moustapha Diaw (born 31 December 1996) is a footballer from Mauritania. He currently plays for FC Nouadhibou and the Mauritania national football team. Besides Mauritania, he has played in Oman, Bahrain, and Belarus.

== Career ==
=== Fanja SC ===
Loaned to Oman Professional League side Fanja SC for four months, Diaw lifted the 2015-16 Oman Professional League trophy with the club, earning the man-of-the-match award in the last round of the season.

The Moroccan media spread rumors that KAC Kénitra of the Botola Pro offered to buy the youngster from ASAC Concorde in 2015 but negotiations failed on the transfer.

In 2019, he signed for Dnyapro Mogilev.

In 2021, he signed for Manama Club.

He is a Mauritania international.

During a 2016 game against Tunisia, Diaw was involved in a fight with winger Wahbi Khazri, who retaliated by hitting the Mauritanian in right side of his face. Both players were given red cards. Following the friendly, national team coach Corentin Martins excluded the defender for his behavior on the pitch, holding several meetings with the player to discipline and harangue him about his actions.

=== International goals ===
Scores and results list Mauritania's goal tally first.

No.	Date	Venue	Opponent	Score	Result	Competition
1.	14 June 2019	Stade de Marrakech, Marrakesh, Morocco	Madagascar	1–1	3–1	Friendly
