= Abdoul Ba =

Mauritanian footballer (born 1994)

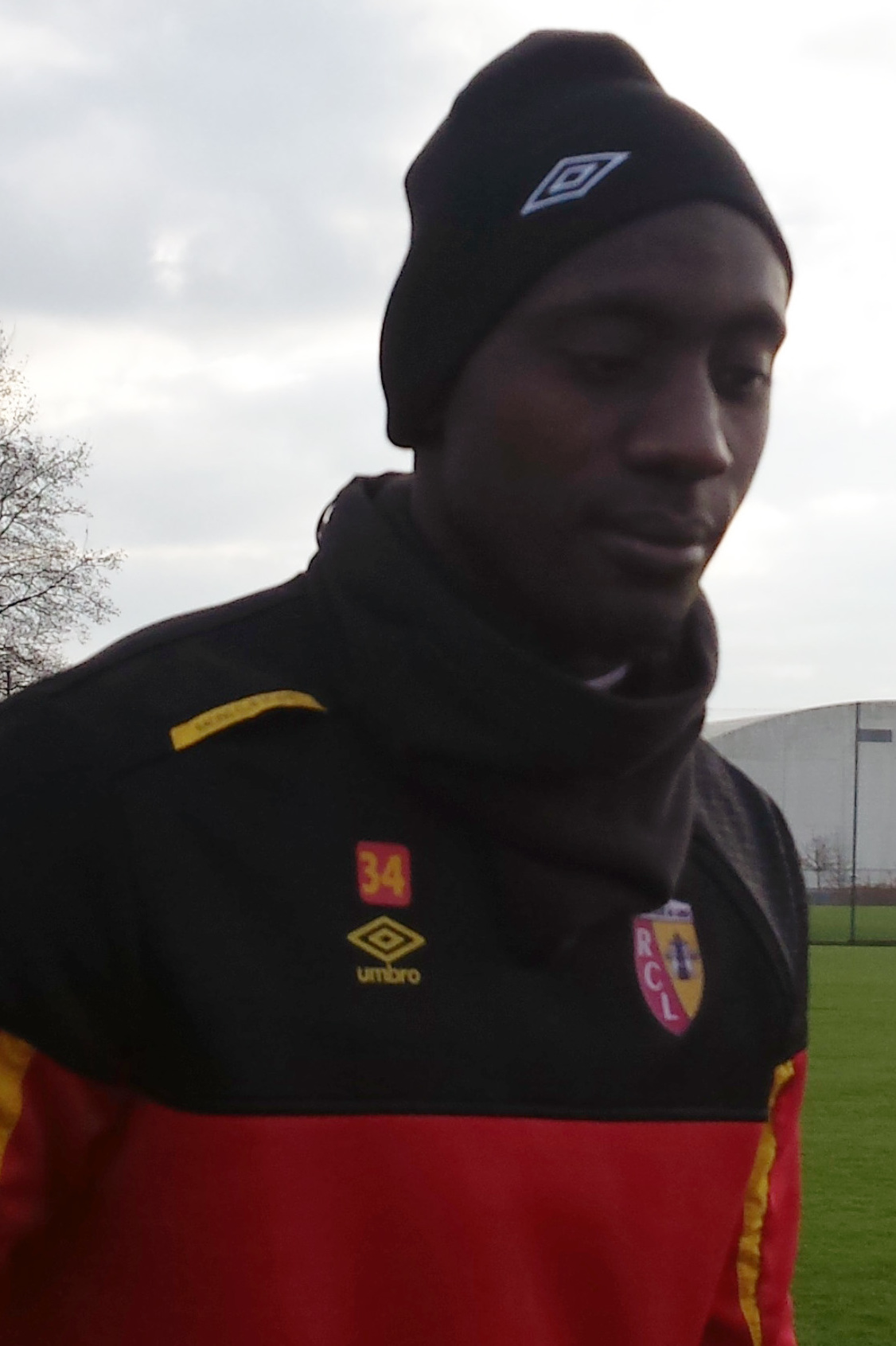
- Ba in 2014

Personal information
- Full name: Abdoul Bocar Ba
- Date of birth: 8 February 1994 (age 32)
- Place of birth: Dakar, Senegal
- Height: 2.02 m (6 ft 8 in)
- Position: Centre-back

Youth career
- 2008–2014: Lens

Senior career*
Years	Team	Apps	(Gls)
2012–2017	Lens II	39	(3)
2014–2017	Lens	39	(0)
2017–2020	Auxerre II	5	(0)
2017–2019	Auxerre	32	(1)
2020–2021	MC Oujda	5	(0)
2021–2022	Al-Ahli Tripoli		
2022	Besa Pejë		

International career^{‡}
2013–2022	Mauritania	48	(0)
- * Club domestic league appearances and goals as of 03:51, 21 October 2021 (UTC) ‡ National team caps and goals as of 15 November 2020

Abdoul Bocar Ba (born 8 February 1994) is a professional footballer who most recently played as a centre-back for Kosovan club Besa Pejë. Born in Senegal, he plays for the Mauritania national team.

== Club career ==
After Ba did not make an appearance for Auxerre since October 2018, the club was unable to agree on a move for him to another club in the 2020 summer transfer window. He eventually signed for MC Oujda in Morocco in November 2020. In October 2021, he signed for Al-Ahli Tripoli in Libya.

== International career ==
Ba played for Mauritania at the African Cup of Nations 2019, the first international tournament of the team.
