= Mohamed Magassouba =

Malian football coach

Personal information
- Date of birth: 12 February 1958 (age 68)
- Place of birth: Mali

Team information
- Current team: Saint-Éloi Lupopo (manager)

Managerial career
- Years: Team
- 1991–1992: Style du Congo
- 1992–1993: Saint-Éloi Lupopo
- 1993–1994: Vita Club
- 1994–1996: Motema Pembe
- 1996–1997: DR Congo (assistant)
- 1997: DR Congo (caretaker)
- 2000: DR Congo
- 2005–2006: Delta Téléstar
- 2006–2007: Stade Malien
- 2017–2019: Mali (caretaker)
- 2019–2022: Mali
- 2022–: Saint-Éloi Lupopo

Mohamed Magassouba (born 12 February 1958) is a Malian football coach.

== Career ==
Magassouba coached in Zaïre, later the Democratic Republic of the Congo, during the 1990s, with the teams Style du Congo, FC Saint-Éloi Lupopo, AS Vita Club and DC Motema Pembe. He was then assistant coach and head coach of DR Congo's national team. In the mid-2000s he managed Delta Téléstar of Gabon and Malian club Stade Malien.

He was caretaker manager of Mali between September 2017 and July 2019, before becoming permanent manager in October 2019. He was fired in April 2022. In July 2022 he was announced as the new manager of Saint-Éloi Lupopo.
