= Srđan Vasiljević =

Serbian football manager and player

Personal information
- Date of birth: 1 April 1973 (age 53)
- Place of birth: Belgrade, SR Serbia, SFR Yugoslavia
- Position: Defender

Youth career
- Red Star Belgrade

Senior career*
Years	Team	Apps	(Gls)
1991–1993	Radnički Beograd	35	(0)
1993–1994	Borac Čačak		
1994–1996	Obilić	36	(3)
1996–1998	Rad	19	(0)
1998–1999	Borac Čačak		
1999–2000	Sartid Smederevo	20	(1)
2001	Dinamo București	2	(0)
2002	Kairat	9	(0)

Managerial career
- 2004-2006: Sinđelić Beograd
- 2006: Javor Ivanjica
- 2009–2010: Čukarički
- 2010: BSK Borča
- 2010–2012: Serbia (assistant)
- 2013–2014: Serbia U21 (assistant)
- 2014–2016: Serbia (assistant)
- 2017: Javor Ivanjica
- 2017–2019: Angola
- 2021–2022: 1º de Agosto
- 2023: Al-Batin
- * Club domestic league appearances and goals

Srđan Vasiljević (Serbian Cyrillic: Срђан Васиљевић; born 1 April 1973) is a Serbian football manager and former player.

== Playing career ==
Vasiljević came through the youth system of Red Star Belgrade. He went on to play for Radnički Beograd, Borac Čačak (twice), Obilić, Rad and Sartid Smederevo, before moving abroad. In early 2001, Vasiljević signed with Romanian club Dinamo București. He then joined Kazakhstan Premier League side Kairat in 2002, appearing in nine championship games that year. Vasiljević also made two appearances in the 2002–03 UEFA Cup.

== Managerial career ==
After hanging up his boots, Vasiljević managed Serbian clubs Javor Ivanjica (twice), Čukarički, and BSK Borča. He also served as assistant manager to Vladimir Petrović and Radovan Ćurčić with the Serbia national team. In December 2017, Vasiljević was appointed manager of the Angola national team. He left the position by mutual consent in August 2019.

On 15 July 2023, Vasiljević was appointed as manager of Saudi Arabian club Al-Batin. He left the club by mutual consent on 13 September 2023.
