= Suez Stadium =

Soccer stadium in the city of Suez, Egypt

Coordinates: 29°57′27″N 32°32′33″E

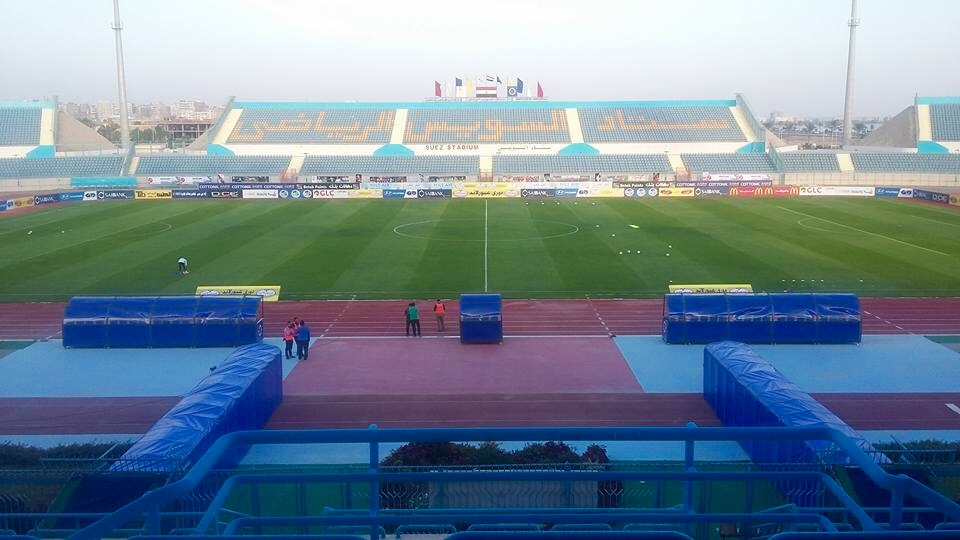
- Interactive map of Suez Stadium
- Location: Suez, Egypt
- Capacity: 27,000 (all seated)
- Surface: Grass

Construction
- Opened: 1990

Tenants
- Asmant El-Suweis; Petrojet

The Suez Stadium is a multi-purpose stadium located in Suez, Egypt. It is used mostly for football and serves as the home stadium of Montakhab Elsuees the main soccer team of the city and also Asmant El-Suweis and Petrojet SC. The stadium has a capacity of 27,000 people. It opened in 1990.

== 2019 Africa Cup of Nations ==
The stadium was one of the venues for the 2019 Africa Cup of Nations. The following eight games were played at the stadium during the competition:

| Date | Time (CEST) | Team #1 | Result | Team #2 | Round | Attendance |
|---|---|---|---|---|---|---|
| 24 June 2019 | 19:00 | Tunisia | 1–1 | Angola | Group E | 7,345 |
| 24 June 2019 | 22:00 | Mali | 4–1 | Mauritania | Group E | 6,202 |
| 28 June 2019 | 16:30 | Tunisia | 0–0 | Mali | Group E | 16,085 |
| 29 June 2019 | 16:30 | Mauritania | 0–0 | Angola | Group E | 10,120 |
| 2 July 2019 | 18:00 | Guinea-Bissau | 0–2 | Ghana | Group F | 6,905 |
| 2 July 2019 | 21:00 | Mauritania | 0–0 | Tunisia | Group E | 7,732 |
| 8 July 2019 | 18:00 | Mali | 0–1 | Ivory Coast | Round of 16 | 7,672 |
| 11 July 2019 | 18:00 | Ivory Coast | 1–1 (3–4 pen.) | Algeria | Quarter-finals | 8,233 |
