= 2017 Africa Cup of Nations Group A =

Football tournament group stage

Group A of the 2017 Africa Cup of Nations was played from 14 to 22 January 2017 in Gabon. The group consisted of hosts Gabon, Burkina Faso, Cameroon, and Guinea-Bissau.

Burkina Faso and Cameroon advanced to the round of 16 as the top two teams.

== Teams ==
Draw position	Team	Method of qualification	Date of qualification	Finals appearance	Last appearance	Previous best performance	CAF Rankings Points (Note: The CAF rankings were used for seeding for the final draw.)	FIFA Rankings Start of event
A1	Gabon	Hosts	8 April 2015	7th	2015	Quarter-finals (1996, 2012)	22	108
A2	Burkina Faso	Group D winners	4 September 2016	11th	2015	Runners-up (2013)	33.5	53
A3	Cameroon	Group M winners	3 June 2016	18th	2015	Winners (1984, 1988, 2000, 2002)	29	62
A4	Guinea-Bissau	Group E winners	5 June 2016	1st	none	Debut	8.5	68

== Standings ==
Pos	Team	Pld	W	D	L	GF	GA	GD	Pts	Qualification
1	Burkina Faso	3	1	2	0	4	2	+2	5	Advance to knockout stage
2	Cameroon	3	1	2	0	3	2	+1	5	Advance to knockout stage
3	Gabon (H)	3	0	3	0	2	2	0	3	
4	Guinea-Bissau	3	0	1	2	2	5	−3	1	

Source: CAF
Rules for classification: Group stage tiebreakers
(H) Hosts

In the quarter-finals:

- The group winners, Burkina Faso, advanced to play the runners-up of Group B, Tunisia.
- The group runners-up, Cameroon, advanced to play the winners of Group B, Senegal.

== Matches ==
All times are local, WAT (UTC+1).

=== Gabon vs Guinea-Bissau ===
14 January 2017
17:00

Gabon	1–1	Guinea-Bissau
Aubameyang 52'	Report	Juary 90+1'

Stade de l'Amitié, Libreville
Attendance: 39,230
Referee: Gehad Grisha (Egypt)

Gabon	Guinea-Bissau

GK	1	Didier Ovono
RB	8	Lloyd Palun
CB	2	Aaron Appindangoyé
CB	5	Bruno Ecuele Manga
LB	6	Johann Obiang	(yellow card) 66'
CM	4	Merlin Tandjigora		(substituted off) 84'
CM	10	Mario Lemina		(substituted off) 73'
CM	22	Didier Ndong
RF	7	Malick Evouna		(substituted off) 88'
CF	9	Pierre-Emerick Aubameyang (c)
LF	20	Denis Bouanga
Substitutions:
MF	12	Guélor Kanga		(substituted in) 73'
MF	17	André Biyogo Poko		(substituted in) 84'
FW	14	Serge Kevyn		(substituted in) 88'
Manager:
(Spain) José Antonio Camacho

GK	1	Jonas Mendes
RB	4	Tomás Dabó
CB	5	Rudinilson Silva
CB	14	Juary Soares
LB	16	Agostinho Soares	(yellow card) 76'
CM	11	Nani Soares
CM	8	Francisco Júnior		(substituted off) 74'
RW	15	Toni Silva
AM	7	Zezinho (c)
LW	19	João Mário		(substituted off) 61'
CF	9	Abel Camará		(substituted off) 66'
Substitutions:
MF	18	Piqueti		(substituted in) 61'
FW	13	Frédéric Mendy		(substituted in) 66'
FW	21	Aldair Baldé		(substituted in) 74'
Manager:
Baciro Candé

Man of the Match:
Zezinho (Guinea-Bissau)

Assistant referees:
Redouane Achik (Morocco)
Waleed Ahmed (Sudan)
Fourth official:
Ali Lemghaifry (Mauritania)

=== Burkina Faso vs Cameroon ===
14 January 2017
20:00

Burkina Faso	1–1	Cameroon
Dayo 75'	Report	Moukandjo 35'

Stade de l'Amitié, Libreville
Referee: Janny Sikazwe (Zambia)

Burkina Faso	Cameroon

GK	16	Hervé Koffi
RB	5	Patrick Malo
CB	14	Issoufou Dayo
CB	4	Bakary Koné
LB	20	Yacouba Coulibaly
CM	18	Charles Kaboré (c)
CM	8	Abdou Razack Traoré		(substituted off) 74'
RW	7	Préjuce Nakoulma
AM	11	Jonathan Pitroipa		(substituted off) 86'
LW	10	Alain Traoré
CF	19	Bertrand Traoré		(substituted off) 61'
Substitutions:
FW	9	Banou Diawara	(yellow card) 86'	(substituted in) 61'
MF	17	Jonathan Zongo		(substituted in) 74'
FW	15	Aristide Bancé		(substituted in) 86'
Manager:
(Portugal) Paulo Duarte

GK	1	Fabrice Ondoa
RB	2	Ernest Mabouka	(yellow card) 14'
CB	5	Michael Ngadeu-Ngadjui	(yellow card) 88'
CB	4	Adolphe Teikeu
LB	6	Ambroise Oyongo
RM	7	Clinton N'Jie		(substituted off) 77'
CM	14	Georges Mandjeck	(yellow card) 62'
CM	15	Sébastien Siani
LM	13	Christian Bassogog		(substituted off) 84'
CF	8	Benjamin Moukandjo (c)	(yellow card) 56'
CF	9	Jacques Zoua
Substitutions:
MF	11	Edgar Salli		(substituted in) 77'
FW	20	Karl Toko Ekambi		(substituted in) 84'
Manager:
(Belgium) Hugo Broos

Man of the Match:
Alain Traoré (Burkina Faso)

Assistant referees:
Jerson Dos Santos (Angola)
Marwa Range (Kenya)
Fourth official:
Rédouane Jiyed (Morocco)

=== Gabon vs Burkina Faso ===
18 January 2017
17:00

Gabon	1–1	Burkina Faso
Aubameyang 38' (pen.)	Report	Nakoulma 23'

Stade de l'Amitié, Libreville
Referee: Bakary Gassama (Gambia)

Gabon	Burkina Faso

GK	1	Didier Ovono
RB	8	Lloyd Palun
CB	5	Bruno Ecuele Manga
CB	2	Aaron Appindangoyé
LB	6	Johann Obiang	(substituted off) 34'
CM	4	Merlin Tandjigora	(substituted off) 66'
CM	17	André Biyogo Poko	(substituted off) 75'
CM	22	Didier Ndong
RF	7	Malick Evouna
CF	9	Pierre-Emerick Aubameyang (c)
LF	20	Denis Bouanga
Substitutions:
DF	19	Benjamin Zé Ondo	(substituted in) 34'
MF	18	Serge Junior	(substituted in) 66'
FW	14	Serge Kevyn	(substituted in) 75'
Manager:
(Spain) José Antonio Camacho

GK	16	Hervé Koffi	(yellow card) 37'
RB	5	Patrick Malo
CB	14	Issoufou Dayo
CB	4	Bakary Koné
LB	20	Yacouba Coulibaly
CM	18	Charles Kaboré (c)
CM	8	Abdou Razack Traoré
RW	17	Jonathan Zongo		(substituted off) 54'
AM	11	Jonathan Pitroipa		(substituted off) 11'
LW	10	Alain Traoré		(substituted off) 77'
CF	9	Banou Diawara
Substitutions:
MF	7	Préjuce Nakoulma		(substituted in) 11'
MF	19	Bertrand Traoré		(substituted in) 54'
MF	6	Bakary Saré		(substituted in) 77'
Manager:
(Portugal) Paulo Duarte

Man of the Match:
Denis Bouanga (Gabon)

Assistant referees:
Jean-Claude Birumushahu (Burundi)
Tahssen Abo El Sadat Bedyer (Egypt)
Fourth official:
Bamlak Tessema Weyesa (Ethiopia)

=== Cameroon vs Guinea-Bissau ===
18 January 2017
20:00

Cameroon	2–1	Guinea-Bissau
Siani 61'; Ngadeu-Ngadjui 78'	Report	Piqueti 13'

Stade de l'Amitié, Libreville
Referee: Youssef Essrayri (Tunisia)

Cameroon	Guinea-Bissau

GK	1	Fabrice Ondoa
RB	19	Collins Fai
CB	4	Adolphe Teikeu
CB	5	Michael Ngadeu-Ngadjui
LB	6	Ambroise Oyongo
CM	14	Georges Mandjeck	(yellow card) 22'	(substituted off) 65'
CM	15	Sébastien Siani
RW	13	Christian Bassogog
AM	8	Benjamin Moukandjo (c)
LW	7	Clinton N'Jie		(substituted off) 46'
CF	10	Vincent Aboubakar		(substituted off) 65'
Substitutions:
FW	20	Karl Toko Ekambi		(substituted in) 46'
DF	3	Nicolas Nkoulou		(substituted in) 65'
FW	18	Robert Ndip Tambe		(substituted in) 65'
Manager:
(Belgium) Hugo Broos

GK	1	Jonas Mendes
RB	4	Tomás Dabó
CB	5	Rudinilson Silva
CB	14	Juary Soares	(yellow card) 30'
LB	22	Mamadu Candé
CM	11	Nani Soares
CM	8	Francisco Júnior
AM	7	Zezinho (c)
RF	15	Toni Silva		(substituted off) 68'
CF	13	Frédéric Mendy		(substituted off) 81'
LF	18	Piqueti		(substituted off) 50'
Substitutions:
MF	20	Idrissa Camará		(substituted in) 50'
FW	17	Leocísio Sami		(substituted in) 68'
FW	9	Abel Camará		(substituted in) 81'
Manager:
Baciro Candé

Man of the Match:
Christian Bassogog (Cameroon)

Assistant referees:
Anouar Hmila (Tunisia)
Yahaya Mahamadou (Niger)
Fourth official:
Denis Dembélé (Ivory Coast)

=== Cameroon vs Gabon ===
22 January 2017
20:00

Cameroon	0–0	Gabon
	Report

Stade de l'Amitié, Libreville
Referee: Daniel Bennett (South Africa)

Cameroon	Gabon

GK	1	Fabrice Ondoa
RB	19	Collins Fai
CB	4	Adolphe Teikeu
CB	3	Nicolas Nkoulou
LB	6	Ambroise Oyongo
CM	15	Sébastien Siani	(yellow card) 18'
CM	5	Michael Ngadeu-Ngadjui
AM	8	Benjamin Moukandjo (c)
RF	13	Christian Bassogog		(substituted off) 83'
CF	18	Robert Ndip Tambe		(substituted off) 83'
LF	11	Edgar Salli		(substituted off) 76'
Substitutions:
FW	9	Jacques Zoua		(substituted in) 76'
FW	10	Vincent Aboubakar		(substituted in) 83'
FW	20	Karl Toko Ekambi		(substituted in) 83'
Manager:
(Belgium) Hugo Broos

GK	1	Didier Ovono
RB	8	Lloyd Palun	(substituted off) 73'
CB	2	Aaron Appindangoyé
CB	5	Bruno Ecuele Manga
LB	19	Benjamin Zé Ondo	(substituted off) 57'
CM	18	Serge Junior
CM	17	André Biyogo Poko
CM	22	Didier Ndong
RF	7	Malick Evouna	(substituted off) 78'
CF	9	Pierre-Emerick Aubameyang (c)
LF	20	Denis Bouanga
Substitutions:
DF	21	Yoann Wachter	(substituted in) 57'
MF	13	Samson Mbingui	(substituted in) 73'
FW	14	Serge Kevyn	(substituted in) 78'
Manager:
(Spain) José Antonio Camacho

Man of the Match:
Denis Bouanga (Gabon)

Assistant referees:
Zakhele Siwela (South Africa)
Aboubacar Doumbouya (Guinea)
Fourth official:
Bernard Camille (Seychelles)

=== Guinea-Bissau vs Burkina Faso ===
22 January 2017
20:00

Guinea-Bissau	0–2	Burkina Faso
	Report	Rudinilson 12' (o.g.); B. Traoré 58'

Stade de Franceville, Franceville
Referee: Bamlak Tessema Weyesa (Ethiopia)

Guinea-Bissau	Burkina Faso

GK	1	Jonas Mendes
RB	4	Tomás Dabó
CB	14	Juary Soares	(yellow card) 80'
CB	5	Rudinilson Silva
LB	22	Mamadu Candé
CM	11	Nani Soares		(substituted off) 63'
CM	8	Francisco Júnior		(substituted off) 76'
AM	7	Zezinho (c)
RF	15	Toni Silva
CF	13	Frédéric Mendy
LF	18	Piqueti		(substituted off) 65'
Substitutions:
MF	3	Lassana Camará		(substituted in) 63'
FW	9	Abel Camará		(substituted in) 65'
FW	21	Aldair Baldé		(substituted in) 76'
Manager:
Baciro Candé

GK	16	Hervé Koffi
RB	2	Steeve Yago
CB	14	Issoufou Dayo
CB	4	Bakary Koné
LB	20	Yacouba Coulibaly
CM	18	Charles Kaboré (c)	(yellow card) 45+1'
CM	8	Abdou Razack Traoré	(yellow card) 7'
RW	19	Bertrand Traoré		(substituted off) 78'
AM	10	Alain Traoré		(substituted off) 67'
LW	7	Préjuce Nakoulma
CF	15	Aristide Bancé		(substituted off) 59'
Substitutions:
FW	21	Cyrille Bayala		(substituted in) 59'
MF	22	Blati Touré		(substituted in) 67'
MF	6	Bakary Saré		(substituted in) 78'
Manager:
(Portugal) Paulo Duarte

Man of the Match:
Préjuce Nakoulma (Burkina Faso)

Assistant referees:
Abel Baba (Nigeria)
Mohammed Abdallah Ibrahim (Sudan)
Fourth official:
Janny Sikazwe (Zambia)
