= 2017 Africa Cup of Nations final =

Football match at the Stade de l'Amitié

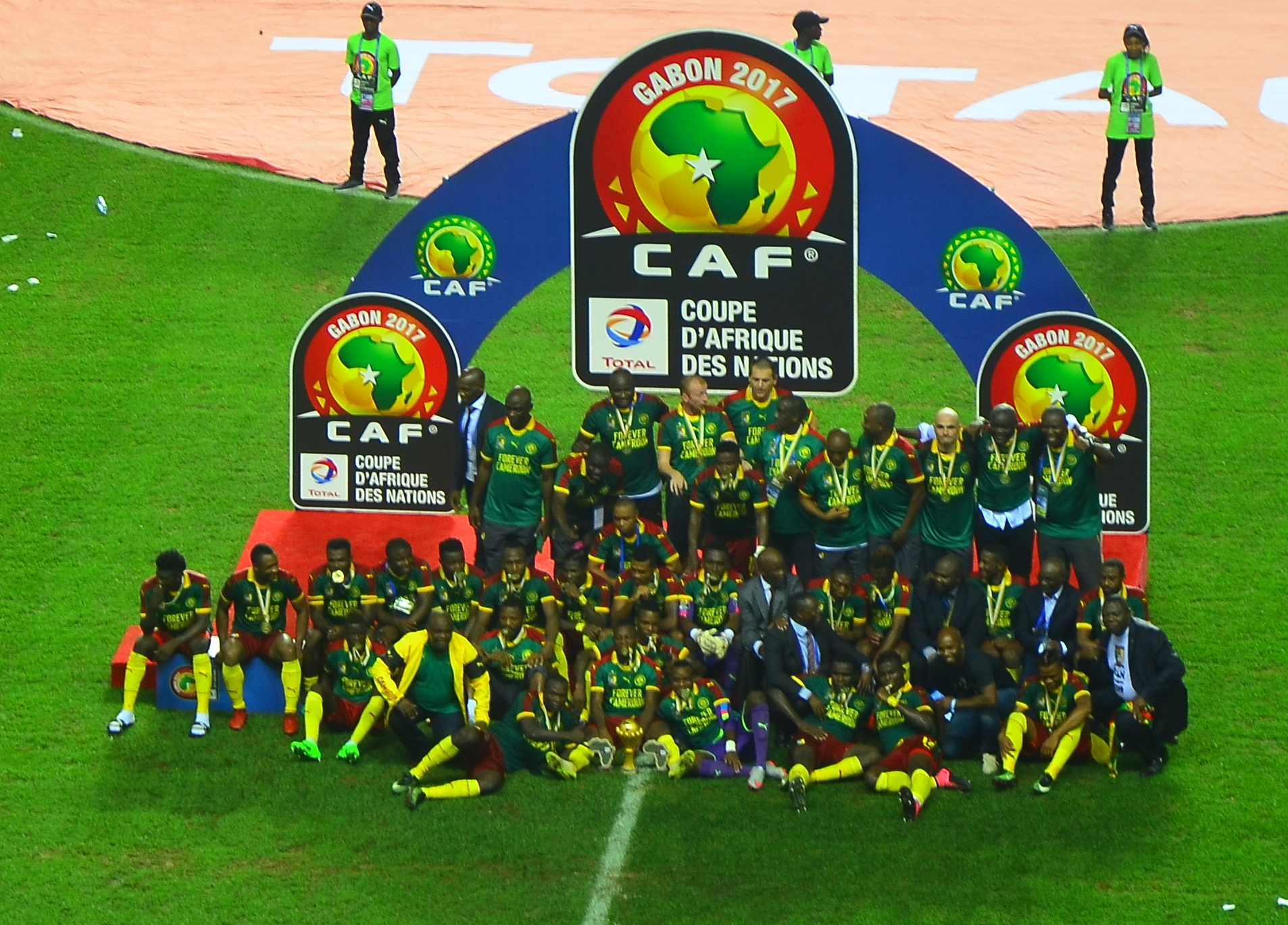
- Cameroon celebrating their victory
- Event: 2017 Africa Cup of Nations
Egypt	Cameroon
1	2
- Date: 5 February 2017
- Venue: Stade de l'Amitié, Libreville
- Man of the Match: Benjamin Moukandjo (Cameroon)
- Referee: Janny Sikazwe (Zambia)
- Attendance: 38,250

The 2017 Africa Cup of Nations final was an association football match to determine the winner of the 2017 Africa Cup of Nations, organised by the Confederation of African Football (CAF). The match was held at the Stade de l'Amitié in Libreville, Gabon, on 5 February 2017 and was contested by Cameroon and Egypt. The sixteen teams who had qualified for the tournament were divided into four groups of four, with the top two from each group progressing to the knock-out phase. Cameroon finished as runners-up in Group A before defeating Senegal and Ghana in the quarter-final and semi-final, while Egypt reached for the final by first winning Group D and then beating Morocco and Burkina Faso.

Egypt started the final strongly and took a 1–0 lead on a goal by Mohamed Elneny after 22 minutes. Cameroon had more possession than Egypt in the first half, but their attack lacked potency, and Egypt led at half time. The Egyptians made few attempts to attack in the second half, and Cameroon equalised after 59 minutes through Nicolas Nkoulou, who had come on as a substitute. Egypt were unable to adjust, and Cameroon continued to have the better chances, eventually scoring again two minutes before the end, through Vincent Aboubakar, to record a 2–1 win. The victory marked their fifth Africa Cup of Nations title. As winners, they represented CAF at the 2017 FIFA Confederations Cup in Russia, but they did not progress beyond the group phase.

== Background ==
The Africa Cup of Nations, organised by the Confederation of African Football (CAF), is the primary international association football competition for African national teams. The 2017 tournament was the 31st edition since its inauguration in 1957. The hosts were Gabon, who were awarded the rights by CAF after original hosts Libya had to withdraw due to the civil war in that country. The tournament consisted of sixteen teams who had qualified for the event, divided into four round-robin groups consisting of four teams. The two top teams from each group advanced to a knock-out phase.

Egypt were appearing in their 23rd tournament, and their 9th final. They had previously won seven (1957, 1959, 1986, 1998, 2006, 2008, 2010) and lost the 1962 final against Ethiopia at the Hailé Sélassié Stadium in Addis Ababa, Ethiopia. Cameroon were appearing in their 18th tournament, and their 7th final. They had previously won four (1984, 1988, 2000, 2002) and lost two (1986, 2008). Egypt and Cameroon had met in two Africa Cup of Nations finals before, in 1986 and 2008. Egypt won both of those finals.

At the start of the tournament, Egypt were ranked 3rd among African nations in the FIFA World Rankings (35th in the world), while Cameroon were 12th (62nd in the world).

== Route to the final ==
=== Cameroon ===
Group stage and knockouts
Round	Opponent	Result
Group	Burkina Faso	1–1
Group	Guinea-Bissau	2–1
Group	Gabon	0–0
QF	Senegal	0–0 (a.e.t.) (5–4 p)
SF	Ghana	2–0

Cameroon began their 2017 Africa Cup of Nations campaign in Group A, alongside Burkina Faso, Guinea-Bissau and the hosts Gabon. Their opening game took place on 14 January 2017, against Burkina Faso. Cameroon took the lead after 35 minutes through a free kick by Benjamin Moukandjo, and then wasted two chances to extend their lead. Burkina Faso equalised in the 75th minute through a close-range goal from Issoufou Dayo, and the match finished as a 1–1 draw. In their second game Cameroon faced Guinea-Bissau, who were playing in their first Africa Cup of Nations and had only ever won four competitive matches in their history. Guinea-Bissau took the lead after 13 minutes through Piqueti, who shot into the top of the goal following a fast-paced run with the ball along most of the length of the pitch. Cameroon equalised after half time, with Sébastien Siani scoring from outside the penalty area, and a Michael Ngadeu-Ngadjui goal on 78 minutes gave them the win. Their final group game was against tournament hosts Gabon. The game finished 0–0, although Gabon almost won the game in injury time when Denis Bouanga's shot hit the post and goalkeeper Fabrice Ondoa had to save Didier Ndong's follow-up. The result ensured that Cameroon qualified for the quarter-finals in second place, behind Burkina Faso, while Gabon were eliminated.

Cameroon's quarter-final was at the Stade de Franceville against Senegal on 28 January. Senegal had several chances during the game, with Mame Diouf shooting over the crossbar just before the 30-minute mark and Ondoa saving consecutive shots by Sadio Mané and Keita Baldé in the second half. Cameroon had to wait until 65 minutes into the game for what writers for BBC Sport described as their "first serious attempt on target". Robert Ndip Tambe hit a volley at Senegal goalkeeper Abdoulaye Diallo, who then saved a follow-up shot by Moukandjo. The Cameroon goalkeeper made late saves to shots from Mané again and Moussa Sow, who had come on as a substitute, leaving the match 0–0 at the end of normal time. Senegal had further chances in extra time but they could not convert them, and the game went to a penalty shoot-out. The first eight penalties were all scored, making it 4–4, but Mané then missed his kick. Vincent Aboubakar scored for Cameroon, to give them a place in the semi-final. This was again held in Franceville, on 2 February against Ghana. The match remained goalless until 72 minutes, with BBC Sport reporter Saj Chowdhury saying that Ghana had "underwhelmed against a side who were clear second favourites going into the match". Cameroon then broke the deadlock, Ngadeu-Ngadjui scoring after poor defending by Ghana. Christian Bassogog added a second goal in the final minute to seal a 2–0 win and a place in the final.

=== Egypt ===
Group stage and knockouts
Round	Opponent	Result
Group	Mali	0–0
Group	Uganda	1–0
Group	Ghana	1–0
QF	Morocco	1–0
SF	Burkina Faso	1–1 (a.e.t.) (4–3 p)

Egypt's campaign commenced in the group stage, competing in Group D along with Ghana, Mali and Uganda. In their first match, played on 17 January 2017, they faced Mali. The game finished 0–0 with few scoring chances for either side. The best chance of the game was a header by Egypt's Marwan Mohsen, which was saved by Mali goalkeeper Oumar Sissoko. Mohamed Elneny also had two chances to score for Egypt, which he wasted, while Ousmane Coulibaly had a chance to seal a win for Mali late on, but his close-range header went over the crossbar. Egypt's second game was against Uganda in Port-Gentil on 21 January. On what reporters for Eurosport described as a "pitch of terrible quality", Egypt dominated the early part of the match as Trézéguet and Tarek Hamed both missed opportunities to take the lead. Uganda improved as the game progressed, and believed that they had scored after 55 minutes through Joseph Ochaya, but the goal was disallowed due to an offside decision. Egypt reasserted their dominance towards the end of the match, and were rewarded when Abdallah El Said, who had come on as a substitute, scored with a powerful shot from a cross by Mohamed Salah. Their final group game was against Ghana, and a Salah free kick after 10 minutes was sufficient to win the game 1–0. Egypt qualified as group winners, with Ghana in second place.

Egypt faced Morocco in the quarter-final, on 29 January in Port-Gentil. Both teams had chances during the game, with Moroccan goalkeeper Munir Mohamedi twice saving from Salah and Aziz Bouhaddouz, Romain Saïss and Mbark Boussoufa missing opportunities for Morocco. With the match seemingly heading for extra time, substitute Mahmoud Abdel-Moneim scored after 87 minutes to seal a 1–0 win for Egypt. Their semi-final was against Burkina Faso, on 1 February in Libreville. Burkina Faso started the game stronger than Egypt, but it was Egypt who opened the scoring as Salah scored into the top corner of the goal after 66 minutes. Their lead lasted only 8 minutes, as Aristide Bancé scored an equaliser with a right-footed volley. The game finished 1–1 after 90 minutes, and went to penalties after no further goals were scored in extra time. Egypt missed their first penalty, with Burkina Faso goalkeeper Hervé Koffi saving El Said's strike. Burkina Faso scored their first three penalties, but Egyptian goalkeeper Essam El Hadary saved the fourth from his opposite number Koffi, to leave the score at 3–3. Amr Warda scored Egypt's fifth penalty, leaving Bertrand Traoré having to score to keep Burkina Faso in the tie. El-Hadary saved again, earning Egypt a 4–3 win and a place in the final.

== Match ==
=== First half ===
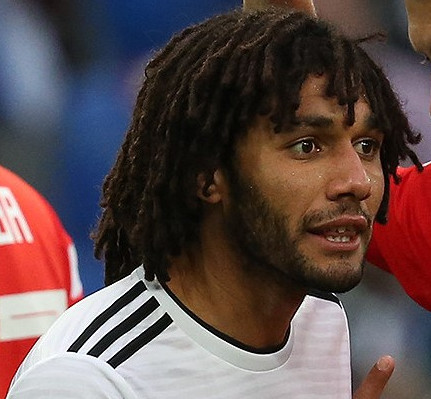
Mohamed Elneny opened the scoring.

The match began at 8 pm local time (7 pm UTC) on 5 February 2017 at Libreville's Stade de l'Amitié, in front of 38,250 supporters. The weather at Libreville airport, 7.5 kilometres (5 mi) from the stadium, (Note: Distance measured using Google Maps distance calculator, between Libreville International Airport, coordinates 0.4570815°N,9.4080224°E and the Stade d'Angondjé, coordinates 0.5222699°N,9.3910025°E.) was partly cloudy at the time of kick off with a temperature of 28 °C (82 °F) and 84% humidity. Egypt wore red, white and black kits, while Cameroon were in green, red and yellow. The referee was Janny Sikazwe of Zambia. Egypt started the match with most of the possession, and almost opened the scoring on 2 minutes when El Said's shot from inside the penalty area was saved by Ondoa. Cameroon's first shot came on 7 minutes, from Siani, but it was easily saved by El Hadary. Cameroon began to have more of the possession after the quarter-hour, and Bassogog had a half-chance outside the penalty area which he shot high and wide.

Egypt took the lead on 22 minutes. Elneny received the ball from Salah, who had cut in from the right, and shot right-footed high to the roof of the net past Ondoa on his left side. Adolphe Teikeu was replaced by Nicolas Nkoulou after 31 minutes, after sustaining a groin injury. Shortly afterwards, Cameroon almost scored when El Hadary failed to claim a cross, but the Egyptian defence was able to clear. Having failed to create many attacking opportunities for most of the half, Cameroon exerted some pressure in the final ten minutes before half time, but they remained unable to score. The half-time score was 1–0 to Egypt. Cameroon had more possession than Egypt in the first half, but the Egyptians had created more scoring opportunities.

=== Second half ===
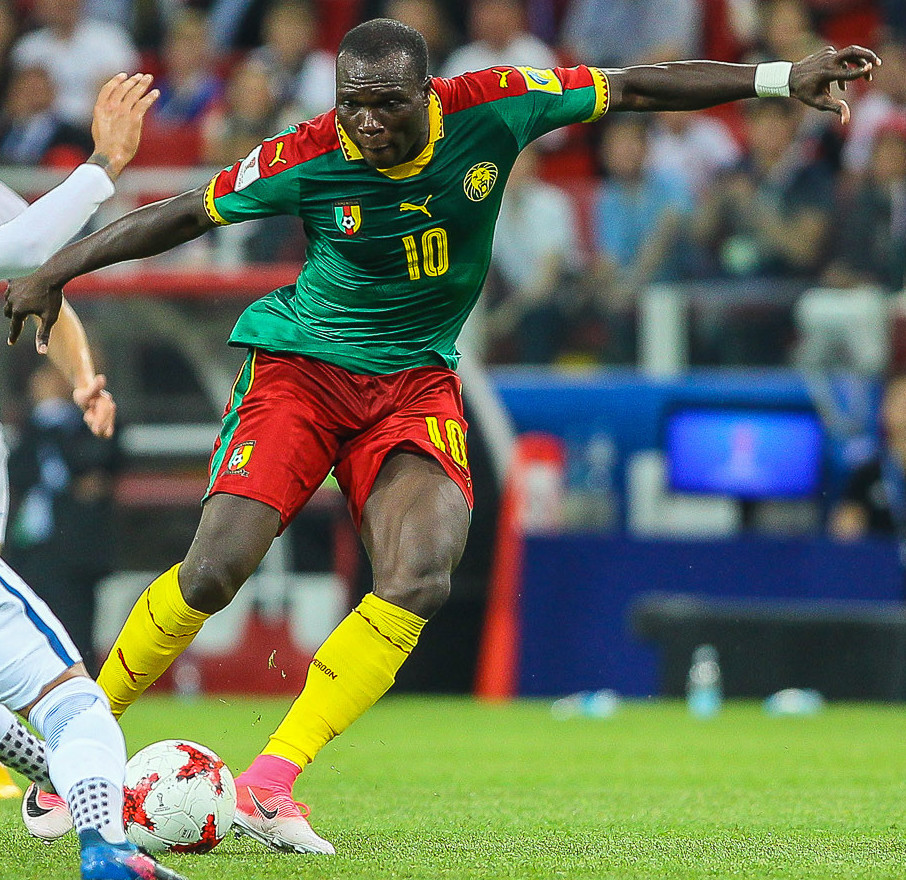
Vincent Aboubakar, who scored the winning goal

Cameroon brought on Aboubakar in attack for Tambe at half time, despite Aboubakar not being fully fit. They continued to enjoy most of the possession, with Egypt seeking to defend their 1–0 lead and making little effort to attack. Cameroon were level after 59 minutes when substitute Nkoulou rose highest to score with a header to the right corner of the net after a cross from the left by Moukandjo. Having started the second half defensively, Egypt struggled to react after the goal went in against them. They made a substitution in the 66th minute, Ramadan Sobhi coming on for Trézéguet. Cameroon continued to have the best chances, including a header by Nkoulou from a corner in the 69th minute, which went over the top of the goal. One minute later they won another corner, when Moukandjo's shot was deflected behind. Ngadeu could not get the ball past El Hadary, however.

Egypt began to play more with more attacking intent in the final 15 minutes of the game than they had in the rest of the half, as Cameroon began to settle back. However, with 2 minutes left, it was Cameroon who scored the winner. Aboubakar controlled a long ball forward with his chest on the edge of the box, and flicked the ball over Ali Gabr before gathering the ball and shooting right footed low to the right of the goalkeeper from 12 yards (11 m) out. Egypt argued that Aboubakar's foot had been too high when lobbing it over Gabr, but the goal was given. There was some fighting among the players 2 minutes into injury time, as Collins Fai was penalised for a foul and Ondoa attempted to waste time. Egypt's free kick was hit over the bar by Elneny. Bassogog was injured in the final minute of injury time, with Cameroon having no remaining substitutes, but they held on to win the game 2–1.

=== Details ===
5 February 2017
20:00 WAT

Egypt	1–2	Cameroon
Elneny 22'	Report	Nkoulou 59'; Aboubakar 88'

Stade de l'Amitié, Libreville
Attendance: 38,250
Referee: Janny Sikazwe (Zambia)

Egypt	Cameroon

GK	1	Essam El-Hadary (c)
RB	3	Ahmed Elmohamady
CB	6	Ahmed Hegazy
CB	2	Ali Gabr
LB	7	Ahmed Fathy
CM	8	Tarek Hamed
CM	17	Mohamed Elneny
RW	10	Mohamed Salah
AM	19	Abdallah Said
LW	21	Trézéguet		(substituted off) 65'
CF	22	Amr Warda
Substitutions:
MF	14	Ramadan Sobhi	(yellow card) 90+2'	(substituted on) 65'
Manager:
(Argentina) Héctor Cúper

GK	1	Fabrice Ondoa
RB	19	Collins Fai	(yellow card) 90+1'
CB	5	Michael Ngadeu-Ngadjui
CB	4	Adolphe Teikeu		(substituted off) 31'
LB	6	Ambroise Oyongo
CM	15	Sébastien Siani
CM	17	Arnaud Djoum
RW	13	Christian Bassogog	(yellow card) 90+4'
AM	9	Jacques Zoua		(substituted off) 90+4'
LW	8	Benjamin Moukandjo (c)
CF	18	Robert Ndip Tambe		(substituted off) 46'
Substitutions:
DF	3	Nicolas Nkoulou		(substituted on) 31'
FW	10	Vincent Aboubakar	(yellow card) 89'	(substituted on) 46'
MF	14	Georges Mandjeck		(substituted on) 90+4'
Manager:
(Belgium) Hugo Broos

Man of the Match:
Benjamin Moukandjo (Cameroon)

Match rules

- 90 minutes
- 30 minutes of extra time if necessary
- Penalty shoot-out if scores still level
- Maximum of three substitutions

=== Statistics ===
Overall
Statistic	Cameroon	Egypt
Goals scored	2	1
Total shots	15	4
Shots on target	3	2
Ball possession	57%	43%
Corner kicks	6	0
Fouls committed	14	11
Yellow cards	3	1
Red cards	0	0

== Aftermath ==
In summarising the "thrilling, edgy" final, BBC Sport's pundits noted that Egypt started comfortably, but allowed their opponents to "come at them" in the second half. Cameroon limited Egypt to mostly playing long balls, and their increasing pressure meant that the Egyptian players succumbed to fatigue in the closing stages of the match. CNN's match report concluded that Aboubakar being brought on at half time revitalised Cameroon's attack and was a turning point in the game. Moukandjo, Cameroon's captain, was named as the man of the match, while his team-mates Bassogog and Ondoa were voted the tournament's best player and best goalkeeper respectively.

Cameroon's Belgian manager Hugo Broos praised the unity of his team, saying "I am happy for the players. This is not a group of football players, they are a group of friends." His Egyptian counterpart Héctor Cúper, who had lost twice before in major finals as coach of Valencia, expressed sorrow not for himself but "because there was so much hope especially among the people in Egypt and I am sorry for the players who put in so much effort".

Cameroon's victory marked their fifth Africa Cup of Nations title. As winners, they went on to represent CAF at the 2017 FIFA Confederations Cup in Russia. They were eliminated in the group phase, finishing bottom of Group B, having lost two games and drawn one.

== See also ==
- 2017 Africa Cup of Nations knockout stage
