= Leocísio Sami =

Bissau-Guinean footballer

Personal information
- Full name: Leocísio Júlio Sami
- Date of birth: 18 December 1988 (age 37)
- Place of birth: Bissau, Guinea-Bissau
- Height: 1.84 m (6 ft 0 in)
- Position: Forward

Team information
- Current team: 1º Dezembro

Youth career
- 1998–2002: Núcleo Sintra
- 2002–2003: Algueirão
- 2003–2004: Mira Sintra
- 2005: Estoril
- 2005–2007: Benfica

Senior career*
Years	Team	Apps	(Gls)
2007–2008	Eléctrico	36	(12)
2008–2009	Aves	27	(3)
2009–2012	Marítimo B	37	(8)
2009–2014	Marítimo	82	(12)
2010	→ Fátima (loan)	13	(3)
2014–2017	Porto	0	(0)
2014–2015	→ Braga (loan)	8	(1)
2015	→ Vitória Guimarães (loan)	14	(0)
2015–2016	→ Akhisar Belediyespor (loan)	27	(2)
2016	→ Akhisar Belediyespor (loan)	5	(0)
2017	→ Arouca (loan)	6	(1)
2017–2018	Aves	6	(0)
2019–2020	Cova Piedade	25	(0)
2022–	1º Dezembro	12	(1)

International career
2011–2017	Guinea-Bissau	11	(0)
- * Club domestic league appearances and goals as of 20:38, 25 March 2023 (UTC)

Leocísio Júlio Sami (born 18 December 1988) is a Bissau-Guinean professional footballer who plays as a forward for Portuguese club S.U. 1º Dezembro.

== Club career ==
Born in Bissau, Sami played the vast majority of his professional career in Portugal, finishing his development at S.L. Benfica. In his first two years as a senior he alternated between the Segunda Liga and the third division, representing Eléctrico F.C. and C.D. Aves.

Sami signed with C.S. Marítimo in the 2009 summer, appearing for both the first and second teams during his four-year spell in the island of Madeira. Late into the 2010 January transfer window he was loaned to second-tier side C.D. Fátima, which eventually avoided relegation. On 18 August 2013, his only Primeira Liga goal of the season helped his parent club to defeat Benfica 2–1.

On 29 May 2014, free agent Sami joined FC Porto on a four-year contract. He never appeared for them in competitive matches, however, being consecutively loaned to S.C. Braga, Vitória S.C. and Turkish Süper Lig's Akhisar Belediyespor. His tenure at the Estádio Municipal de Braga was curtailed in January 2015, due to a run-in with manager Sérgio Conceição.

In February 2017, still owned by Porto, Sami moved to F.C. Arouca in the Portuguese top flight. On 3 July, he returned to Aves on a two-year contract.

== International career ==
Sami was selected for the 2017 Africa Cup of Nations by manager Baciro Candé. During the tournament in Gabon, which ended in group stage exit, he featured 24 minutes in the 1–2 loss to Cameroon.

== Career statistics ==
=== Club ===
As of 12 February 2017

Club statistics
Club	Season	League			Cup (Note: Includes the Taça de Portugal and Turkish Cup.)		League Cup (Note: Includes the Taça da Liga.)		Continental		Other		Total	
Club	Season	Division	Apps	Goals	Apps	Goals	Apps	Goals	Apps	Goals	Apps	Goals	Apps	Goals
Porto	2014–15	Primeira Liga	0	0	0	0	0	0	0	0	0	0	0	0
Porto	2015–16	Primeira Liga	0	0	0	0	0	0	0	0	0	0	0	0
Porto	2016–17	Primeira Liga	0	0	0	0	0	0	0	0	0	0	0	0
Porto	Total		0	0	0	0	0	0	0	0	0	0	0	0
Braga (loan)	2014–15	Primeira Liga	8	1	2	0	1	0	—		0	0	11	1
Vitória Guimarães (loan)	2014–15	Primeira Liga	14	0	0	0	1	1	—		0	0	15	1
Vitória Guimarães (loan)	Total		22	1	2	0	2	1	—		0	0	26	4
Akhisar Belediyespor (loan)	2015–16	Süper Lig	27	2	5	2	—		—		0	0	32	4
Akhisar Belediyespor (loan)	2016–17	Süper Lig	5	0	1	1	—		—		0	0	6	1
Akhisar Belediyespor (loan)	Total		32	2	6	3	—		—		0	0	38	5
Arouca (loan)	2016–17	Primeira Liga	5	0	0	0	0	0	—		0	0	5	0
Aves	2016–17	Primeira Liga	0	0	0	0	0	0	—		0	0	0	0
Career total			59	3	8	3	2	1	0	0	0	0	69	7

=== International ===
National team	Year	Apps	Goals
Guinea-Bissau	2011	3	0
Guinea-Bissau	2012	1	0
Guinea-Bissau	2013	0	0
Guinea-Bissau	2014	2	0
Guinea-Bissau	2015	4	0
Guinea-Bissau	2016	0	0
Guinea-Bissau	2017	1	0
Total		11	0

== Honours ==
Aves

- Taça de Portugal: 2017–18
