= Nicolas Nkoulou =

Cameroonian footballer (born 1990)

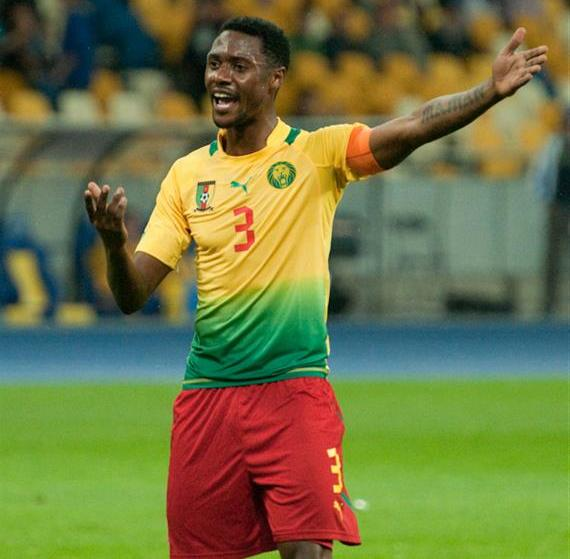
- Nkoulou with Cameroon in 2013

Personal information
- Full name: Nicolas Julio Nkoulou Ndoubena
- Date of birth: 27 March 1990 (age 36)
- Place of birth: Yaoundé, Cameroon
- Height: 1.85 m (6 ft 1 in)
- Position: Centre back

Youth career
- Kadji Sports Academy
- 2007–2008: Monaco

Senior career*
Years	Team	Apps	(Gls)
2008–2011	Monaco	78	(0)
2011–2016	Marseille	162	(5)
2016–2018	Lyon	13	(0)
2017–2018	→ Torino (loan)	37	(2)
2018–2021	Torino	85	(4)
2021–2022	Watford	3	(0)
2022–2023	Aris	17	(1)
2023–2024	Gaziantep	32	(2)
2024–2025	Amedspor	15	(0)
2025	→ Sakaryaspor (loan)	15	(0)

International career
2008	Cameroon Olympic	3	(0)
2008–2023	Cameroon	83	(2)
Medal record
Men's football
Representing Cameroon
Africa Cup of Nations
Winner	2017
- * Club domestic league appearances and goals

Nicolas Julio Nkoulou Ndoubena (born 27 March 1990) is a Cameroonian former professional footballer who played as a centre-back.

Nkoulou began his career in the French league with Monaco, where he spent three years before signing for Marseille in 2011. With Marseille, he won his first senior trophy, the Coupe de la Ligue in the 2011–12 season. In 2016, he left Marseille for Lyon, but after a disappointing year he left to join Italian club Torino, initially on loan but later on a permanent basis. Though initially impressing, he fell out of favour, and left the club in 2021, and signed for English club Watford that same year.

Internationally, Nkoulou played 75 times for Cameroon between 2008 and 2017, and decided to retire shortly after winning the 2017 Africa Cup of Nations, scoring the equalising goal in the final. He represented Cameroon in three World Cups and three Africa Cup of Nations. In September 2022, he was called up to the national team for the first time after 5 years. He then acquired eight more appearances for his country until 2023.

== Club career ==
=== Monaco ===
Nkoulou began his career at Kadji Sports Academy in Douala, the same academy that produced the likes of Samuel Eto'o, Carlos Kameni, and Eric Djemba-Djemba. In late 2007, it was announced that he was acquired by the principality-based side AS Monaco. He agreed to a three-year professional contract with the club. He spent the latter portion of the 2007–08 season playing with Monaco's CFA squad, before joining the squad for preseason in July 2008, where he was handed the number 3 kit.

Nkoulou made two appearances during the pre-season starting their opening friendly match against fellow Ligue 1 side Toulouse and also starting against Croatian side NK Zagreb. He made his professional debut on 13 September 2008 in a 2–0 victory over Lorient starting the match before being substituted in the 65th minute. Though he made 24 appearances in the 2008–09 season,

The 2009–10 season saw Nkoulou to play as defensive midfielder for most of the season under the new management of Guy Lacombe and new signing, Sébastien Puygrenier. As the 2009–10 season progressed, Nkoulou signed a new contract with the club, keeping him until 2012 and was then reverted to central defence. NKoulou also played in the Coupe de France Final, coming on as a substitute for Eduardo Costa in the 111th minute, in a 1–0 loss against PSG and went on to make 23 appearances in the 2009–10 season despite being committed to the African Cup of Nation.

In the 2010–11 season, Nkoulou found himself in the transfer speculation and ended up staying at the club despite fallen out with Lacombe. Nkoulou continued remain in the first team, playing in the defensive midfielder position for most of the season and central defence. Despite suffering from injuries and suspension, Nkoulou finished the 2010–11 season, making 30 appearances. However, following their relegation to Ligue 2, Nkoulou was among key players to be expected to leave the club.

His performances with Monaco have led to him being scouted by several prominent European clubs. English club Arsenal, Spanish sides Sevilla and Atlético Madrid and French champions Olympique Lyonnais have all declared their interests in the Cameroonian defender. During his time at AS Monaco, Nkoulou made 78 appearances and has started every match since playing the full 90 minutes in them all. He has yet to score a goal.

=== Marseille ===
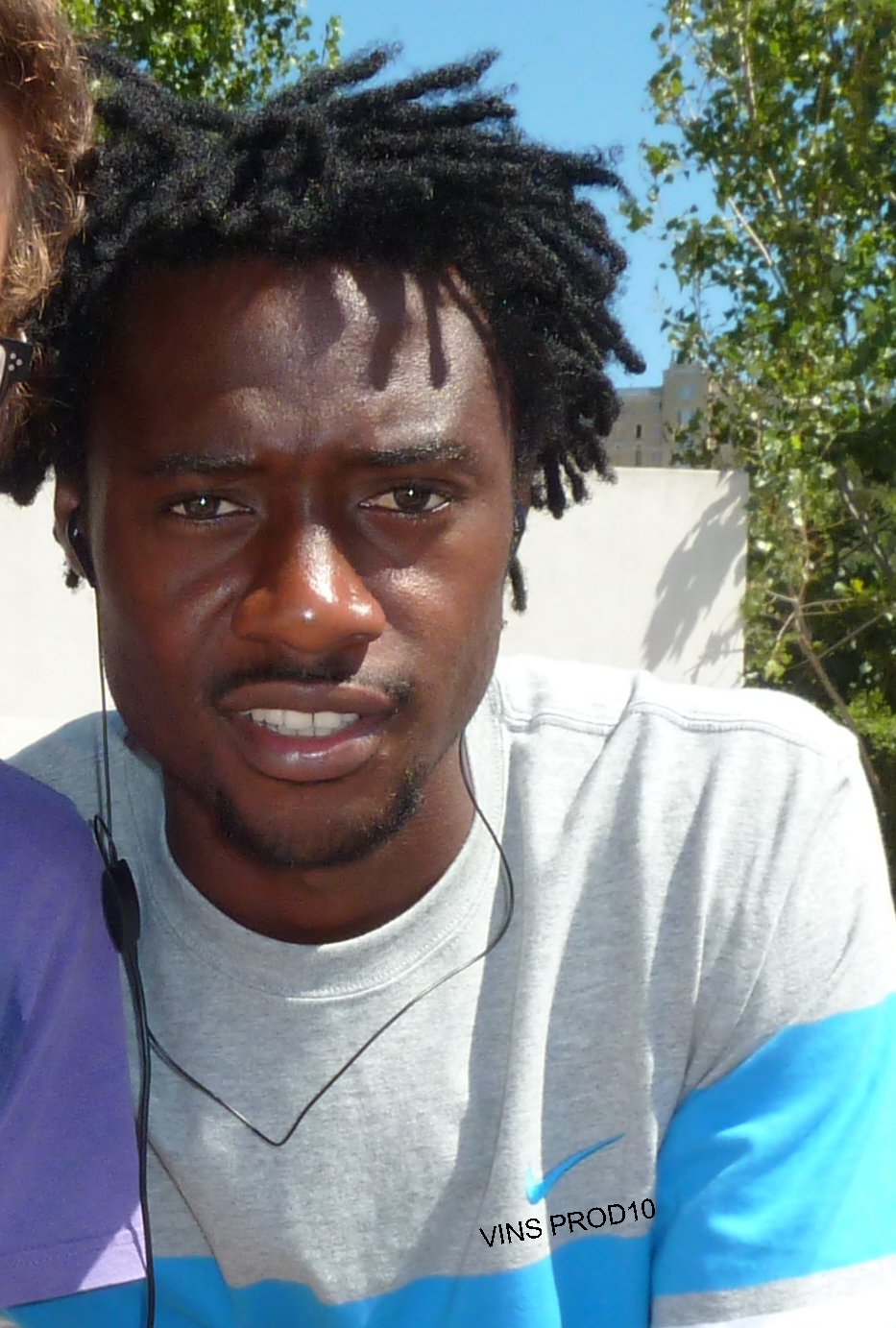
N'Koulou pictured during his time at Marseille.

On 29 June 2011, Nkoulou passed his medical and signed for four years with Marseille for €3.5 million. Marseille and Lyon found themselves competing over their interest signing Nkoulou before he chose Marseille.

After missing two matches, due to suspension he received while at Monaco, Nkoulou made his Marseille debut on 14 August 2011, in a 2–2 draw against Auxerre. In the next match against Saint Étienne on 21 August 2011, Nkoulou was involved in an incident with Florent Sinama Pongolle. But following the reviewing by the Disciplinary Committee of the LFP, he was received a three match ban. While serving his suspension in the league, he made his Champions League debut on Matchday 1 of the Group–stage, helping a club kept a clean sheet, in a 1–0 win against Olympiacos on 13 September 2011 and went on to play ten Champions League Matches. Eight days later on 21 September 2011, Nkolou made his return to the first team, in a 2–0 win over Evian. His performance throughout October saw him earned the club's player of the month of October. Nkolou continued to remain in the first team for the 2011–12 season despite another suspension (which he got a two match ban against Dijon) and a knee injury. Despite this, Nkoulou helped the club win against Lyon 1–0 in the final of Coupe de la Ligue, winning the cup for their first piece of silverware since 1981, as well as, being named Man of the Match. After finishing the 2011–12 appearance, making 46 appearances in all competition, Nkoulou was named Trophées UNFP du football's Team of the Year of 2012 and was nominated for the Prix Marc-Vivien Foé Award, but finished as runner–up to Younès Belhanda. Nevertheless, Nkoulou was awarded 2011–12 Olympique de Marseille Player of the Season.

In the 2012–13 season saw Nkoulou found himself in the transfer speculation when the club began to suffer financial trouble, but stayed at the club and insisting on honouring his contract. Nkoulou was ever–present in the 2012–13 season, having played all the match in the league and scored his first goal for the club, in a 2–1 win against Troyes on 3 March 2013. During the season, Nkoulou suffered a knee ligament injury and was sidelined for weeks, but managed to return to the league. At the end of the 2012–13 season, Nkoulou was named Trophées UNFP du football's Team of the Year of 2013 for the second time running.

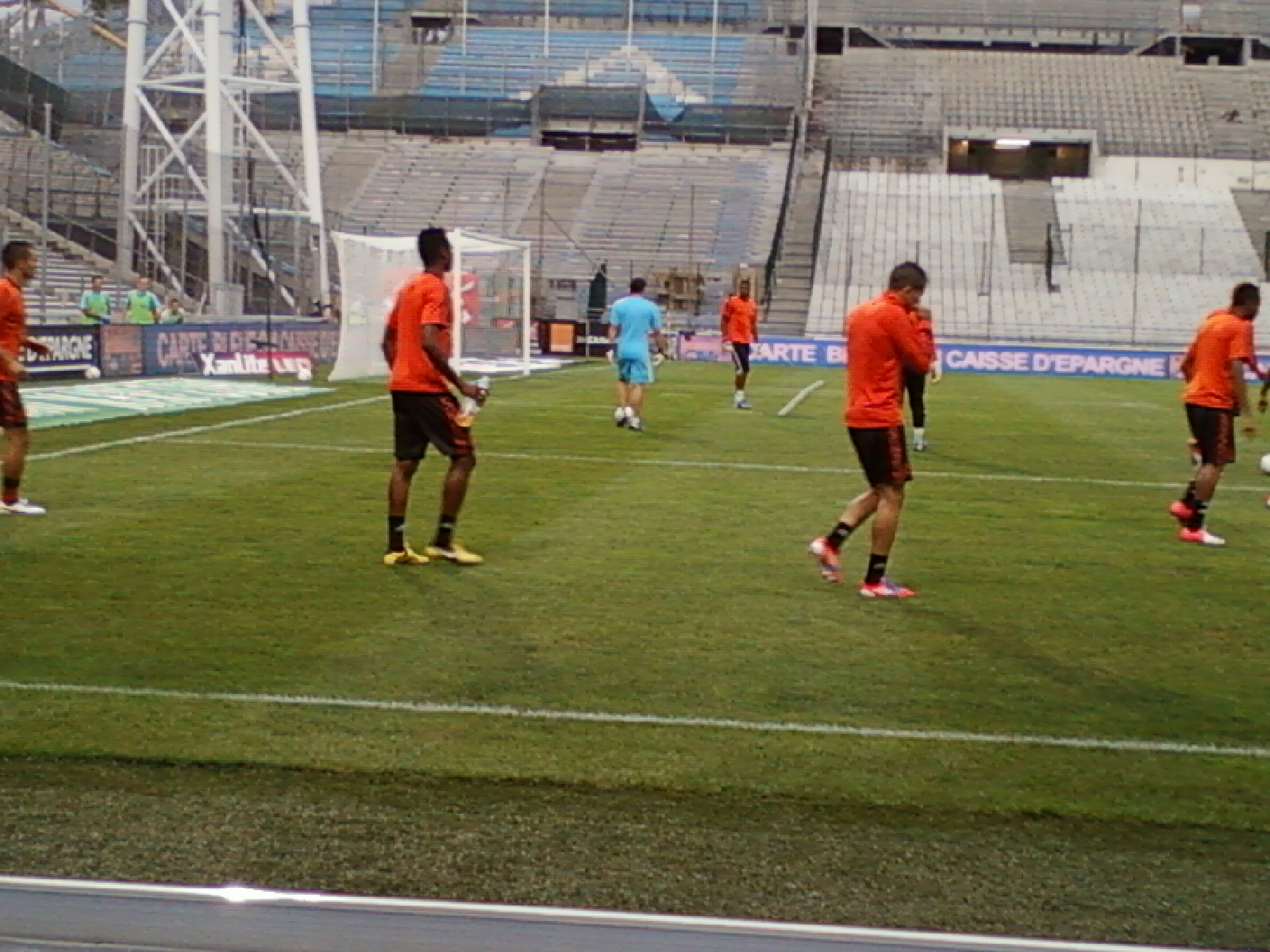
N'Koulou training at Marseille in 2012.

Prior to the 2013–14 season, Nkoulou stated he was prepared to leave Marseille in the summer, prompting attracted interests from his former club Monaco, who were just promoted back to Ligue 1, and Arsenal. After the club set a higher price tag on him, Nkoulou remained at the club and started a bad start when he conceded a goal, in a 3–1 win over Guingamp in the opening game of the season. Despite this, Nkoulou redeemed himself soon after to continuously remain in the first team under the new management of Élie Baup. On 4 January 2014, Nkoulou extended his contract with Marseille, keeping him until 2016. As the 2013–14 season progressed, Nkoulou suffered a knee injury, which kept him sidelined for one match. After making his return, Nkoulou went on to score two goals later in the season against Saint Étienne and Sochaux. Nkoulou made 46 appearances and scoring twice in all competitions in the 2013–14 season.

Ahead of the 2014–15 season, the club were keen on selling Nkoulou, but following a friendly match against Bari, it appeared hinted that he wanted to stay at the club. His good performance against Guingamp on 23 August 2014 earned him Team of the Week on Matchday 3. Then on 19 October 2014, Nkoulou scored his first goal of the season, in a 2–0 win over Toulouse. Two weeks later, on 2 November 2014, Nkoulou scored again, in a 2–1 win over Lens. However, as the 2014–15 season, his appearance was soon restricted to 26 appearances in competition, due to injuries and international commitment with Cameroon. After two months without playing, Nkoulou made his first team return on 12 April 2015, in a 1–0 loss against Bordeaux and went on to help the finished the season in the 4th place at two points of a qualification in the Champions League.

Ahead of the 2015–16 season, Nkoulou's contract set to expire and haven't renewed his contract, though his future remained undecided. In the 2015–16 season, Nkoulou made his first appearance of the season, having missed through opening game of the season, in a 1–0 loss against Reims on 16 August 2015. In a match against Lille on 29 January 2016, Nkoulou captained Marseille for the first time following Steve Mandanda's absence, which they drew 1–1. In a match against Saint-Étienne on 21 February 2016, Nkoulou received a straight red card in a 1–1 draw. In addition to his disciplinary issues, Nkoulou was suspended three times in every Coupe de France matches, Nkoulou started in the Coupe de France Final, which they lost 4–2 against PSG. At the end of the 2015–16 season, the club faced a difficult season with three different managers during the season and finished the league in thirteenth place and finished the season, making 41 appearances in all competition.

With his contract expiring at the end of the 2015–16 season, Nkoulou attracted interests around clubs, such as Málaga, Schalke 04, Juventus and Lazio. However, on 27 June 2016, Nkoulou began talks with a move to stay in France by joining Lyon.

=== Lyon ===
After spending five years at Marseille, with his contract at the club expired, Nkoulou moved to rivals Lyon on a four–year contract on 29 June 2016; coincidentally was the day he joined Marseille. Upon joining the club, Nkoulou stated he joined Lyon to achieve greater things and was given number 3 shirt, which he quoted: ‘’“The No. 3? It is a wink to those close to me, because I am the youngest of three children.”’’

Nkoulou played his first official match for Lyon at the Trophée des Champions, making his first start, in a 4–1 loss against Paris Saint–Germain. A week later, he made his league debut for the club, in the opening game of the season, in a 3–0 win over Nancy. In his first match against Marseille for the first time, which saw them draw 0–0 on 18 September 2016, Nkoulou received boos from Marseille supporters during the match every time he touched the ball. Around the same time he was competing with Mouctar Diakhaby, Nkoulou's performance soon came under criticism by observers, prompting Manager Bruno Génésio defended him.

=== Torino ===
On 5 August 2017, Italian club Torino announced they had signed Nkoulou on a year-long loan with an option to purchase. He made his debut on 11 August 2017, in the Coppa Italia against Trapani, won by Torino 7–1. His debut in Serie A took place instead on 20 August, against Bologna (1–1). He scored his first goal for the club on 2 December, during a 1–1 draw against Atalanta. At the end of his first season with the club, he was voted by the fans as the best player of Torino in the 2017–18 season. His contract was redeemed by Torino for €3.5 million.

On 2 September 2018, he scored his first goal of the 2018–19 season, and the match-winner with a header against SPAL (1–0). In August 2019, Nkoulou asked to not be selected for Torino's Serie A fixture against Sassuolo, and their UEFA Europa League play-off against Wolverhampton Wanderers, with a desire to transfer to AS Roma. In September, with no transfer taking place, he wrote a letter saying he had decided to "leave the difficult moment of the summer behind me", and apologised to Torino fans, staff, and his teammates.

At the end of the 2020–21 season, Nkoulou parted ways with Torino upon the expiry of his contract.

=== Watford ===
After spending time as a free agent, on 7 October 2021, Premier League club Watford announced the signing of Nkoulou on a deal until the end of the season.

Following relegation at the end of the 2021–22 season, Nkoulou was released by the club.

=== Aris ===
On 23 August 2022, Nkoulou joined Super League Greece club Aris on a free transfer on a two-year contract.

=== Gaziantep ===
On 11 September 2023, Turkish Süper Lig club Gaziantep announced the signing of Nkoulou on a one-year contract.

== International career ==
Nkoulou was included in the Cameroon U-23 squad that participated in the 2008 Summer Olympics. He helped the squad reach the knockout round, where they were eliminated by Brazil.

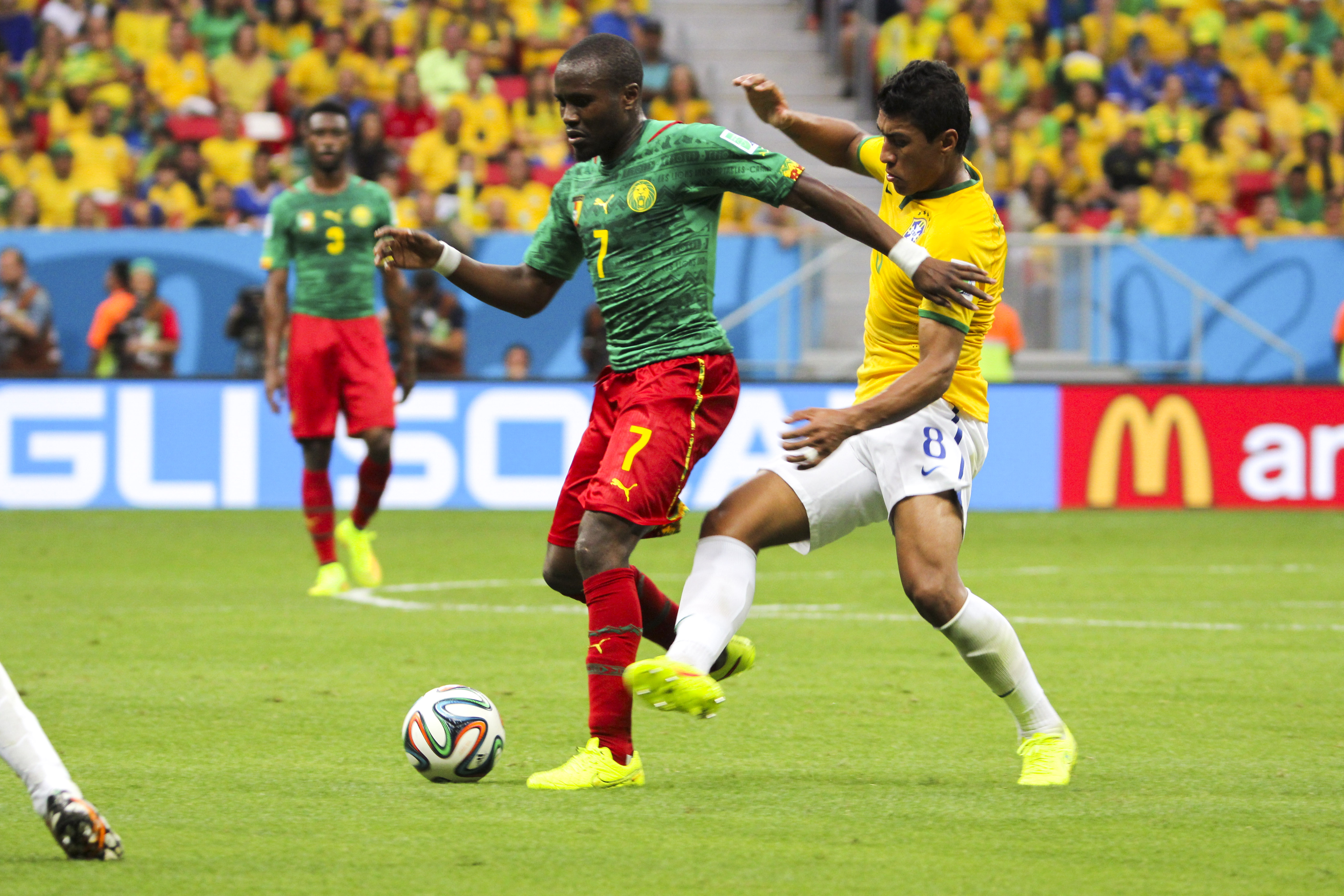
Nkoulou looks on in the background as his compatriot Landry N'Guémo battles Paulinho for the ball during the 2014 FIFA World Cup on 23 June.

Nkoulou was called up by the national team for the first time on 4 November 2008 He would make his international debut in the senior squad on 19 November 2008 in a friendly against South Africa, which they lost 3–2.

Nkoulou selected for the 2010 African Cup of Nations by Cameroon National coach Paul Le Guen and went on to play four times in the cup competitions. Later in 2010, N’Koulou was called up again for the 2010 FIFA World Cup and made his World Cup debut, making his first start and playing 90 minutes, in a 1–0 loss against Japan. N’Koulou played all three matches in the World Cup, as Cameroon were eliminated in the group stage.

After captain Samuel Eto'o and vice–captain Eyong Enoh were suspended for five and two matches respectively by Cameroon Football Federation for their action of boycotting a friendly match against Algeria, Nkoulou was appointed as captain of Cameroon on a temporary basis and captained his first national match, in a 1–0 win over Guinea-Bissau.

Following Eto’o refused to return to the national squad in late-August 2012, The Cameroon Football Federation stripped him of his captaincy in response and Nkoulou was appointed as a new captain of Cameroon. In the FIFA World Cup, Nkoulou was among 23 players to be included for the squad. Nkoulou played all three matches and retained his captaincy, as Cameroon struggled in the World Cup after losing three matches that saw them eliminated in the World Cup. The following year, Nkoulou was called up into the squad by the national team for the African Cup of Nations.

Two years later on 26 March 2016, Nkoulou scored his first international goal, in a 2–2 draw against South Africa, the team he made his national debut eight years ago.

His equalizing goal against Egypt in the 2017 Africa Cup of Nations Final is the first goal to be conceded by Egypt in the Africa Cup of Nations finals since Mengistu Worku's goal in the 1962 African Cup of Nations final.

== Career statistics ==
=== Club ===
Appearances and goals by club, season and competition
Club	Season	League			Cup		League Cup		Europe		Total	
Club	Season	Division	Apps	Goals	Apps	Goals	Apps	Goals	Apps	Goals	Apps	Goals
Monaco	2008–09	Ligue 1	24	0	1	0	1	0	–		26	0
Monaco	2009–10	Ligue 1	24	0	3	0	1	0	–		28	0
Monaco	2010–11	Ligue 1	30	0	1	0	2	0	–		33	0
Monaco	Total		78	0	5	0	4	0	0	0	87	0
Marseille	2011–12	Ligue 1	30	0	2	0	4	0	10	0	46	0
Marseille	2012–13	Ligue 1	38	1	2	0	1	0	7	0	48	1
Marseille	2013–14	Ligue 1	37	2	2	0	2	0	5	0	46	2
Marseille	2014–15	Ligue 1	24	2	1	0	1	0	–		26	2
Marseille	2015–16	Ligue 1	33	0	3	0	0	0	5	0	41	0
Marseille	Total		162	5	10	0	8	0	27	0	207	5
Lyon	2016–17	Ligue 1	13	0	1	0	1	0	7	0	22	0
Torino	2017–18	Serie A	37	2	2	0	–		–		39	2
Torino	2018–19	Serie A	36	2	2	0	–		–		38	2
Torino	2019–20	Serie A	31	1	2	0	5	0	–		38	1
Torino	2020–21	Serie A	18	1	2	0	–		–		20	1
Torino	Total		122	6	8	0	5	0	0	0	135	6
Watford	2021–22	Premier League	3	0	0	0	0	0	—		3	0
Aris	2022–23	Super League Greece	17	1	0	0	—		—		17	1
Gaziantep	2023–24	Süper Lig	32	0	2	0	—		—		34	0
Amed	2024–25	Süper Lig	13	0	2	0	—		—		15	0
Career total			442	12	28	0	18	0	34	0	522	12

=== International ===
Appearances and goals by national team and year
National team	Year	Apps	Goals
Cameroon	2008	1	0
Cameroon	2009	7	0
Cameroon	2010	16	0
Cameroon	2011	7	0
Cameroon	2012	6	0
Cameroon	2013	7	0
Cameroon	2014	14	0
Cameroon	2015	10	0
Cameroon	2016	3	1
Cameroon	2017	4	1
Cameroon	2022	5	0
Cameroon	2023	3	0
Total		83	2

Scores and results list Algeria's goal tally first, score column indicates score after each Nkoulou goal

List of international goals scored by Nicolas Nkoulou
No.	Date	Venue	Opponent	Score	Result	Competition
1.	26 March 2016	Limbe Stadium, Limbe, Cameroon	South Africa	2–2	2–2	2017 Africa Cup of National qualification
2.	5 February 2017	Stade de l'Amitié, Libreville, Gabon	Egypt	1–1	2–1	2017 Africa Cup of Nations final

== Honours ==
Marseille

- Coupe de la Ligue: 2011–12

Cameroon

- Africa Cup of Nations: 2017

Individual

- Ligue 1 Team of the Year: 2011–12, 2012–13
