= Juary Soares =

Bissau-Guinean footballer (born 1992)

Personal information
- Full name: Juary Martinho Soares
- Date of birth: 20 February 1992 (age 34)
- Place of birth: Bissau, Guinea-Bissau
- Height: 1.80 m (5 ft 11 in)
- Position: Defender

Team information
- Current team: Amora
- Number: 14

Youth career
- –2009: Sporting Bissau
- 2009–2011: Sporting
- 2009–2010: → U. Leiria (loan)

Senior career*
Years	Team	Apps	(Gls)
2011–2014	Sporting	0	(0)
2011–2012	→ Sertanense (loan)	23	(0)
2012	→ U. Leiria (loan)	0	(0)
2013–2014	Sporting B	16	(0)
2014–2015	Tirsense	10	(0)
2014–2015	S.L. Benfica de Macau	12	(3)
2015–2016	S.U. 1º Dezembro	27	(0)
2016–2020	Mafra	94	(2)
2020–2021	Créteil	18	(0)
2021–	Amora	8	(1)

International career^{‡}
2016–	Guinea-Bissau	21	(1)
- * Club domestic league appearances and goals as of 28 November 2021 ‡ National team caps and goals as of 13:45, 11 December 2020 (UTC)

Juary Martinho Soares (born 20 February 1992) is a Bissau-Guinean footballer who plays as a defender. He plays for Portuguese Liga 3 side Amora.

== Club career ==
On 13 January 2013, Juary made his debut with Sporting B in a 2012–13 Segunda Liga match against Oliveirense.

After six years in the Portuguese second and third levels, split by a year in Macau with Benfica de Macau in 2014–15, Juary moved to France, joining Championnat National side Créteil in the summer of 2020.

== International career ==
Juary Soares was born in Guinea-Bissau, but raised in Portugal. He was called up to the Guinea-Bissau national football team for the 2017 Africa Cup of Nations qualification matches against Kenya, and made his debut in the 1–0 win. That qualification campaign was for the first time successful and at the Africa Cup Nations debut match for Guinea-Bissau, Juary Soares scored the equalising goal in stoppage time against host country Gabon.

=== International goals ===
Scores and results list Guinea-Bissau's goal tally first.

Goal	Date	Venue	Opponent	Score	Result	Competition
1.	14 January 2017	Stade d'Angondjé, Libreville, Gabon	Gabon	1–1	1–1	2017 Africa Cup of Nations
