= Piqueti =

Bissau-Guinean footballer

Personal information
- Full name: Piqueti Djassi Brito Silva
- Date of birth: 12 February 1993 (age 33)
- Place of birth: Bissau, Guinea-Bissau
- Height: 1.73 m (5 ft 8 in)
- Position: Winger

Youth career
- 2011–2012: Braga

Senior career*
Years	Team	Apps	(Gls)
2012–2017	Braga B	129	(15)
2014–2017	Braga	4	(1)
2015	→ Gil Vicente (loan)	3	(0)
2017–2018	Marítimo	2	(0)
2018	→ Académica (loan)	6	(0)
2018–2019	Varese	10	(0)
2019	Al-Shoulla	16	(1)
2019–2021	Ismaily	26	(1)
2021–2023	Al-Shoulla	78	(18)
2023–2024	Najran		
2024–2026	Tuwaiq		

International career
2012−2013	Portugal U20	15	(1)
2015–2023	Guinea-Bissau	40	(7)
- * Club domestic league appearances and goals as of 20:37, 6 December 2021 (UTC)

Piqueti Djassi Brito Silva (born 12 February 1993), knowly simply as Piqueti, is a Bissau-Guinean professional footballer who plays as a right winger.

== Club career ==
Born in Bissau, Piqueti signed for S.C. Braga in 2011 for his last year as a junior. He went on to spend several seasons with the reserves in the Segunda Liga, making his debut in the competition on 22 August 2012 by coming on as a second-half substitute in a 1–0 away loss against C.F. Belenenses.

Piqueti first appeared in the Primeira Liga with the first team on 14 March 2014, playing two minutes of the 1–1 away draw with Académica de Coimbra. Again from the bench, on 5 April, he scored his first goal competitive goal for them, contributing to a 2–0 victory at S.C. Olhanense.

Late into the 2015 winter transfer window, Piqueti was loaned to fellow league club Gil Vicente FC, featuring rarely in a relegation-ending campaign. On 30 May 2017, he signed with C.S. Marítimo also of the top division, who in turn loaned him to second-tier Académica.

On 26 February 2019, Piqueti joined Prince Mohammad bin Salman League's Al-Shoulla FC from Italian amateurs S.S.D. Varese Calcio.

On 29 August 2023, Piqueti joined Najran.

On 14 July 2024, Piqueti joined Tuwaiq.

== International career ==
Piqueti represented Portugal at under-20 level, notably helping his adopted nation to the fourth place in the 2013 Toulon Tournament. He switched allegiance to Guinea Bissau in 2015, earning his first senior cap on 8 October by replacing Cícero Semedo in the 72nd minute of the 1–1 draw in Liberia for the 2018 FIFA World Cup qualifiers (4–2 aggregate defeat).

Piqueti was selected for the 2017 Africa Cup of Nations by manager Baciro Candé, featuring 29 minutes in the group stage opener against hosts against Gabon (1–1). He scored his first goal for his country the following match, putting his team ahead in an eventual 2–1 loss to Cameroon; the individual effort was described as "superb".

Piqueti was also part of the squad at the 2019 and 2021 Africa Cup of Nations.

=== International goals ===
As of 30 March 2021
Scores and results list Guinea-Bissau's goal tally first, score column indicates score after Piqueti goal.

List of international goals scored by Piqueti
No.	Date	Venue	Opponent	Score	Result	Competition
1.	18 January 2017	Stade d'Angondjé, Libreville, Gabon	Cameroon	1–0	1–2	2017 Africa Cup of Nations
2.	14 October 2018	Estádio 24 de Setembro, Bissau, Guinea-Bissau	Zambia	1–1	2–1	2019 Africa Cup of Nations qualification
3.	23 March 2019	Estádio 24 de Setembro, Bissau, Guinea-Bissau	Mozambique	1–0	2–2	2019 Africa Cup of Nations qualification
4.	13 November 2019	Estádio 24 de Setembro, Bissau, Guinea-Bissau	Eswatini	1–0	3–0	2021 Africa Cup of Nations qualification
5.	30 March 2021	Estádio 24 de Setembro, Bissau, Guinea-Bissau	Congo	1–0	3–0	2021 Africa Cup of Nations qualification
