= Emiliano Té =

Bissau-Guinean footballer

Personal information
- Full name: Emiliano Té
- Date of birth: April 15, 1983 (age 43)
- Place of birth: Bissau, Guinea-Bissau
- Position: Midfielder

Team information
- Current team: Guinea-Bissau (head coach)

Senior career*
Years	Team	Apps	(Gls)
2002–2004	São João de Vêr	19	(1)
2004–2005	Felgueiras	19	(0)
2005–2007	Odivelas	16	(1)
2007	Portosantense	21	(1)
2008	Yanbian	3	(0)
2009	Igreja Nova	6	(0)
2010	Mafra	14	(0)
2010–2011	Tondela	28	(0)
2011–2012	Louletano	27	(0)
2012–2014	União de Leiria	9	(0)
2014	Sintrense		
2014–2015	1º de Dezembro		
2015–2016	Coruchense		

International career
2007–2014	Guinea-Bissau	5	(0)

Managerial career
- Guinea-Bissau (assistant)
- 2025–: Guinea-Bissau
- * Club domestic league appearances and goals

Emiliano Té (born April 15, 1983 in Bissau) is a Bissau-Guinean football coach and former midfielder. He is the head coach of the Guinea-Bissau national team, who he represented as a player.

He holds Portuguese nationality and played mostly in Portugal, but also played briefly for Chinese club Yanbian FC in 2008.

During the 2021 Africa Cup of Nations, Té assumed control of the national team for the Group D match against Egypt, after head coach Baciro Candé was ruled unavailable due to contracting COVID. Guinea-Bissau lost the match, 1–0.

On 1 August 2025, Té became the head coach of the Guinea-Bissau national team.
