= Sébastien Siani =

Cameroonian footballer

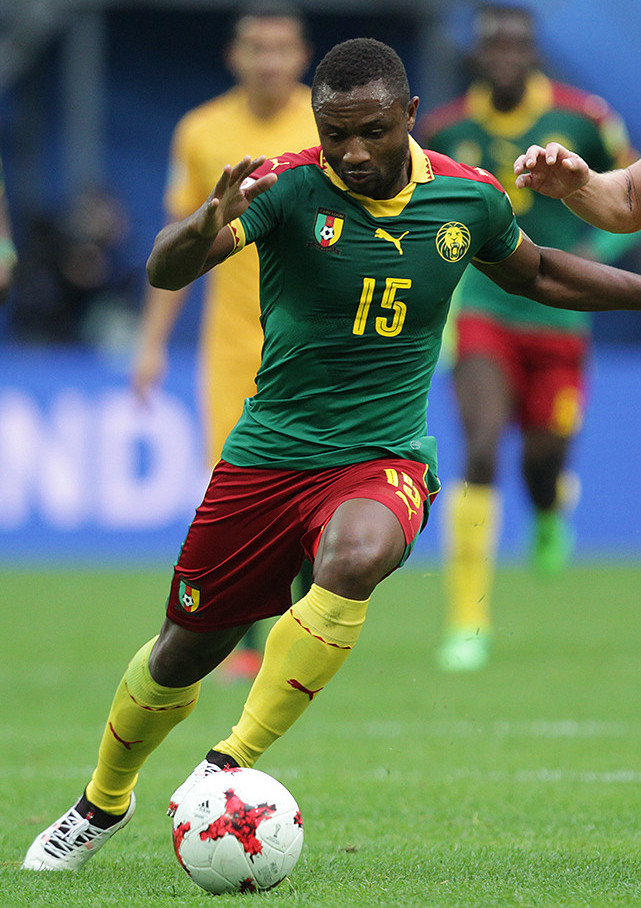
- Siani at the 2017 FIFA Confederations Cup

Personal information
- Full name: Sébastien Clovis Siani
- Date of birth: 21 December 1986 (age 39)
- Place of birth: Douala, Cameroon
- Height: 1.73 m (5 ft 8 in)
- Position: Midfielder

Team information
- Current team: Knokke
- Number: 7

Youth career
- 2000–2004: Kadji Sports Academy

Senior career*
Years	Team	Apps	(Gls)
2004–2005	Union Douala	30	(6)
2006–2011	Anderlecht	3	(0)
2007	→ Zulte Waregem (loan)	12	(1)
2008	→ Union SG (loan)	34	(10)
2008–2010	→ Sint-Truiden (loan)	53	(10)
2011–2013	RWDM Brussels	63	(19)
2013–2018	Oostende	167	(22)
2018	Antwerp	13	(1)
2018–2019	Al Jazira	22	(1)
2020	Ajman	7	(1)
2021–	Knokke	7	(1)

International career^{‡}
2015–2018	Cameroon	28	(2)
Medal record
Men's football
Representing Cameroon
Africa Cup of Nations
Winner	2017 Gabon
- * Club domestic league appearances and goals as of 20:52, 19 December 2021 (UTC) ‡ National team caps and goals as of 21 April 2021

Sébastien Siani (born 21 December 1986) is a Cameroonian professional footballer who plays as a midfielder for Belgian National Division 1 club Knokke.

== Club career ==
Siani played four years for the Kadji Sports Academy, before transferring to Union Douala in July 2004.

Siani moved to Europe joining Anderlecht in July 2005 before leaving for Zulte-Waregem on a half-year loan a year later. In the 2007–08 season he played one season on loan at Union Saint-Gilloise. One year later, he signed to Sint-Truiden on loan.

On 11 July 2018, Al Jazira has signed Cameroonian midfielder Sébastien Siani for on seasons by buying the player's card from Royal Antwerp represent Al Jazira from the new season of the UAE Pro-League.

In July 2021, after being a free agent for a year, Siani signed a two-year contract with Knokke.

== International career ==
Siani debuted for the Cameroon national football team in a friendly against Nigeria on 10 October 2015.

== Honours ==
Cameroon

- Africa Cup of Nations: 2017

== Career statistics ==
=== International ===
Scores and results list Cameroon's goal tally first.

List of international goals scored by Sébastien Siani
No.	Date	Venue	Opponent	Score	Result	Competition
1.	26 March 2016	Limbe Stadium, Limbe, Cameroon	South Africa	1–1	2–2	2017 Africa Cup of Nations qualification
2.	18 January 2017	Stade de l'Amitié, Libreville, Gabon	Guinea-Bissau	1–1	2–1	2017 Africa Cup of Nations
