= Mohamed Elneny =

Egyptian footballer (born 1992)

Mohamed Elneny محمد الننى
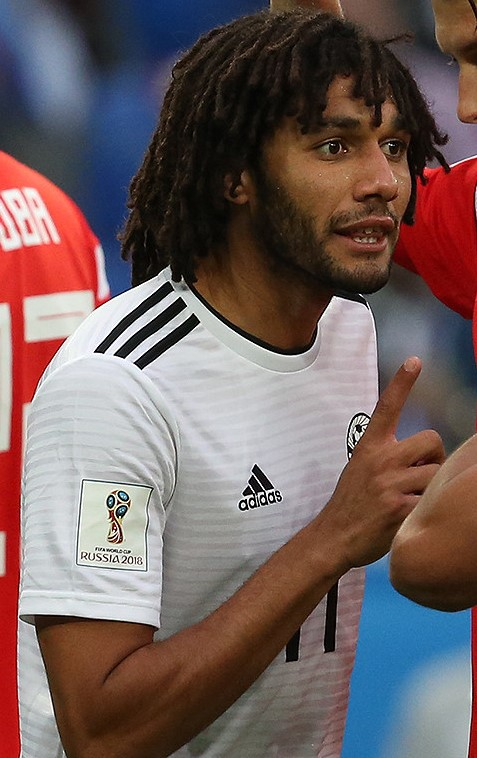
- Elneny with Egypt at the 2018 FIFA World Cup

Personal information
- Full name: Mohamed Naser Elsayed Elneny
- Date of birth: 11 July 1992 (age 34)
- Place of birth: El Mahalla El Kubra, Egypt
- Height: 1.79 m (5 ft 10 in)
- Position: Defensive midfielder

Team information
- Current team: Levadiakos
- Number: 6

Youth career
- 1997–2008: Al Ahly
- 2008–2010: Al Mokawloon

Senior career*
Years	Team	Apps	(Gls)
2010–2013	Al Mokawloon	35	(2)
2013	→ Basel (loan)	15	(0)
2013–2016	Basel	76	(5)
2016–2024	Arsenal	91	(4)
2019–2020	→ Beşiktaş (loan)	27	(1)
2024–2026	Al Jazira	48	(3)
2026–	Levadiakos	2	(0)

International career^{‡}
2009–2011	Egypt U20	7	(2)
2010–2015	Egypt U23	5	(1)
2024	Egypt Olympic (O.P.)	6	(0)
2011–2025	Egypt	108	(8)
Medal record
Men's football
Representing Egypt
Africa Cup of Nations
Runner-up	2017 Gabon
Runner-up	2021 Cameroon
- * Club domestic league appearances and goals as of 07:18, 14 June 2026 (UTC) ‡ National team caps and goals as of 05:37, 7 November 2026 (UTC)

Mohamed Naser Elsayed Elneny (Arabic: محمد ناصر السيد الننى; born 11 July 1992) is an Egyptian professional footballer who plays as a defensive midfielder for Super League Greece club Levadiakos and the Egypt national team. Known for his possession ability, passing, and mobility, he is regarded as one of the best Egyptian players of all time.

Elneny began his senior career in the Egyptian Premier League, before moving to Swiss club Basel in January 2013. He won eight honours at Basel, including the Swiss Super League in each of his four seasons. In January 2016, he transferred to Arsenal, where he won the FA Cup the next year. He joined Beşiktaş on loan in 2019, and upon returning to Arsenal the following year, won the FA Community Shield. Elneny departed Arsenal in 2024 as their then-longest-serving player. He then joined UAE Pro League club Al Jazira, where he won the UAE League Cup in 2025.

Elneny competed at the 2012 Summer Olympics for the Egyptian under-23 team. He has earned over 100 caps for the senior team since 2011, representing Egypt at the Africa Cup of Nations in 2017, 2019, 2021 and 2023, as well as the 2018 FIFA World Cup. He scored in the 2017 final defeat.

== Early life ==
Elneny was born in El Mahalla El Kubra. When he was young, his father used to make him sleep with a football to "forge a connection". Elneny has said: "Since I was born my parents wanted to see me as a footballer, and they are behind this passion I have for football."

== Club career ==
=== Al Mokawloon ===
Elneny played his youth football with Al Ahly. In 2008, he transferred to Al Mokawloon during the 2010–2011 season. Elneny advanced and became a regular in the starting team. Following the Port Said Stadium disaster in early February 2012, the Egyptian Premier League was stopped and all subsequent matches of the 2011–12 Egyptian Premier League were postponed. On 10 March 2012, the Egyptian Football Association announced their decision to cancel the remainder of the season.

=== Basel ===
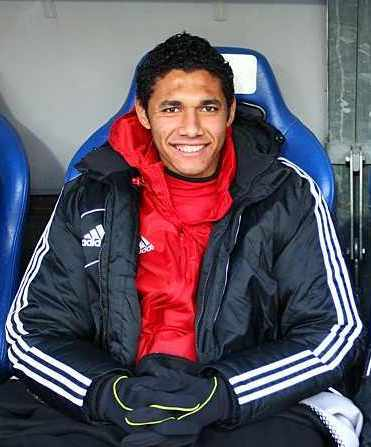
Elneny with Basel in 2013

FC Basel had been watching Elneny for some time and invited him to their training camp in Estepona from 14 to 24 January 2013. Elneny played his unofficial debut on 18 January 2013 during the friendly match against Steaua București, a 1–1 draw. Elneny was able to impress Basel's trainer Murat Yakin during the training camp and on 29 January 2013, it was announced that he had signed a loan contract with Basel up until the end of June 2013. Elneny played his official debut for Basel in the 2012–13 Swiss Super League season on 10 February 2013 in the 3–0 home win against Sion as he was substituted in at half time.

At the end of the Swiss Super League season 2012–13 Elneny won the Championship title and was Swiss Cup runner up with Basel. In the 2012–13 UEFA Europa League Basel advanced as far as the semi-finals, there being matched against the reigning UEFA Champions League holders Chelsea, but they were knocked out, losing both home and away ties, beaten 2–5 on aggregate.

During May 2013 Basel announced that they had taken up the option of signing the Egyptian midfielder on a permanent basis. He signed a four-year contract up until 30 June 2017. He scored his first goal for Basel, the last goal of the match, in the 4–2 home win at the St. Jakob-Park against Zurich on 16 April 2014. At the end of the 2013–14 Super League season, Elneny won the league championship with Basel. They also reached the final of the 2013–14 Swiss Cup, but were beaten 2–0 by Zürich in extra time. During the 2013–14 Champions League season, Basel reached the group stage and finished the group in third position. Thus they qualified for Europa League knockout phase, where they advanced as far as the quarter-finals. In the 2013–14 season, Basel played a total of 68 matches (36 Swiss League fixtures, 6 Swiss Cup, 6 Champions League and 10 Europa League and 10 test matches). Elneny totaled 55 appearances, 32 League, 4 Cup, 6 Champions League and 6 Europa League as well 7 in the test games. He scored just that one goal in the league.

The season 2014–15 was a very successful one for Elneny and FC Basel. The championship was won for the sixth time in a row that season and in the 2014–15 Swiss Cup they reached the final. But for the third season in a row, they finished as runners-up, losing 0–3 to FC Sion in the final. Basel entered the Champions League in the group stage and reached the knockout phase as on 9 December 2014 they managed a 1–1 draw at Anfield against Liverpool. But then Basel then lost to Porto in the Round of 16. Basel played a total of 65 matches (36 Swiss League fixtures, 6 Swiss Cup, 8 Champions League and 15 test matches). Under manager Paulo Sousa Elneny totaled 51 appearances, 29 in the Super League, 6 in the Cup and 7 in the Champions League, as well 9 in test games. He scored 5 goals in these matches.

Despite the fact that Elneny left the club during the winter break, under their new trainer Urs Fischer Basel won the Swiss Super League championship at the end of the 2015–16 Super League season. For Elneny it was the fourth title, for the club it was the seventh in a row and their 19th championship title in total. During his time with the club, Elneny played a total of 169 games for Basel scoring a total of 13 goals. 91 of these games were in the Swiss Super League, 16 in the Swiss Cup, 37 in the UEFA competitions (Champions League and Europa League) and 25 were friendly games. He scored five goals in the domestic league, three in the cup, two in the Europa League and the other three were scored during the test games.

=== Arsenal ===
==== 2016–2019 ====
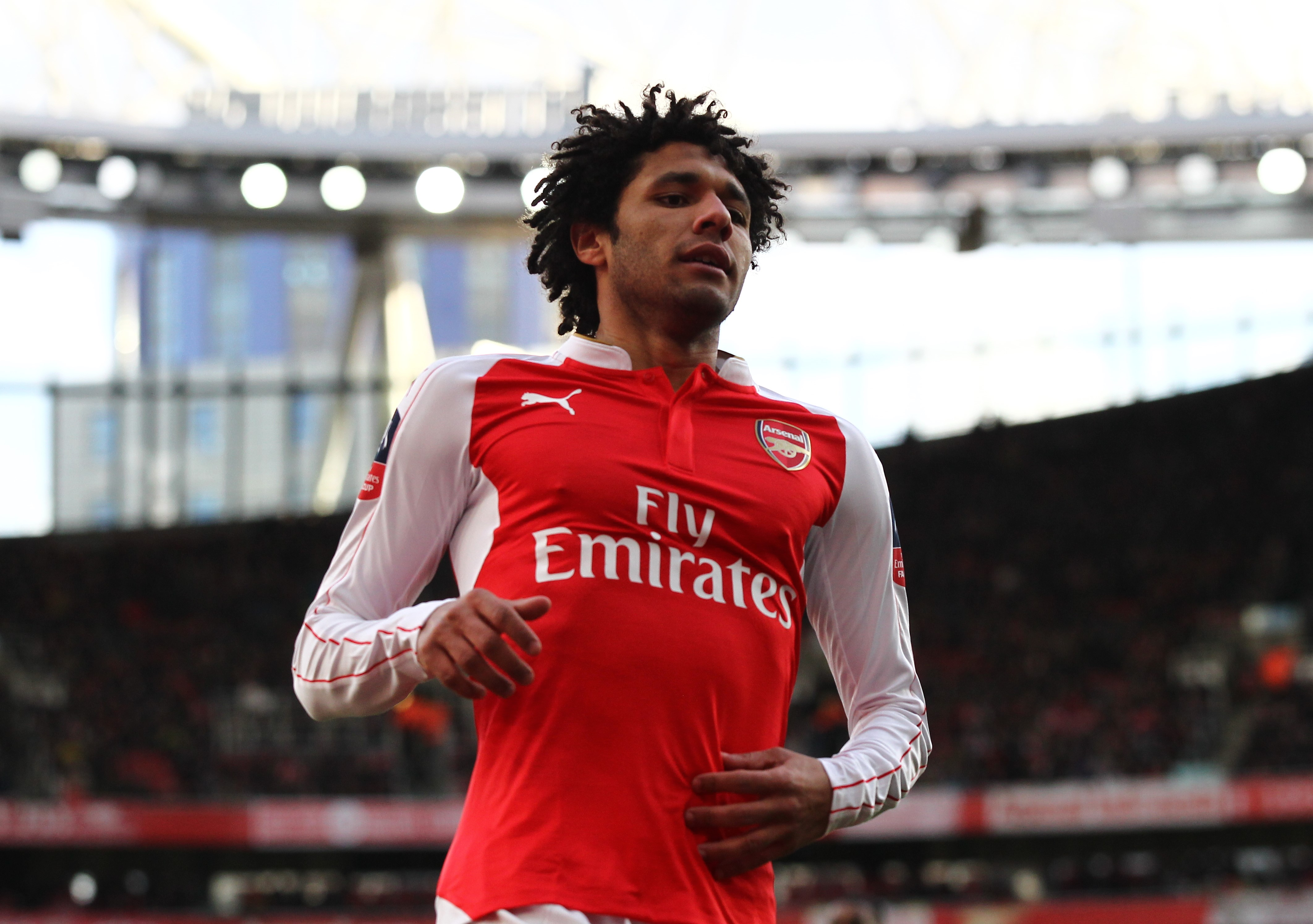
Elneny playing for Arsenal in 2016

On 13 January 2016, after a 3–3 draw against Liverpool, Arsenal manager Arsène Wenger confirmed the signing of Elneny from FC Basel. The following day, the transfer was officially confirmed by the club for an undisclosed fee reported to be somewhere between £5 million and £7.4 million. He was assigned the number 35 shirt for Arsenal. He made his debut for the club in a 2–1 win against Burnley in the fourth round of the FA Cup on 30 January, becoming the first Egyptian ever to play for Arsenal. Elneny scored his first Arsenal goal in the Champions League Round of 16 second leg defeat against FC Barcelona, and was later awarded Arsenal's Player of the Month award for March. He also starred in April combining well with Aaron Ramsey, winning the Arsenal's Player of the Month award for a second month. Elneny's only goal won him the goal of the season award for Arsenal. In the 2017–18 season, on 7 December 2017, Elneny scored his first goal at the Emirates Stadium (his second for Arsenal overall) in the Europa League Group Stage against FC BATE Borisov in a match which ended 6–0 to the home side. On 15 February, Elneny again produced a commendable display in the first leg of Arsenal's round of 32 Europa league tie against Östersunds FK. Elneny was subsequently rewarded man of the match for his effort in a 3–0 away victory.

On 26 March 2018, Elneny renewed his contract with Arsenal. On 8 April 2018, Elneny was sent off against Southampton. In a tight game defender Jack Stephens tussled with Jack Wilshere and retaliation from Stephens resulted in referee Andre Marriner giving him a straight red. Wilshere escaped with just a yellow card but in the aftermath, Elneny received a red card after a shove on future Arsenal teammate Cédric Soares, that was his first red card ever in his professional career. Arsenal held on to win 3–2.

==== 2019–2020: Loan to Beşiktaş ====
On 31 August 2019, Elneny joined Beşiktaş on a season-long loan deal with an optional buyout clause. On 14 September, Elneny was sent off in his debut in a 3–2 defeat against Gazisehir Gaziantep in the Turkish Super Lig. On 25 July 2020, he scored his first and only goal for the club in a 3–0 victory over Genclerbirligi.

==== 2020–2024: Return to Arsenal and eventual exit ====
On 29 August 2020, Elneny was in the starting 11 in the 2020 FA Community Shield, which Arsenal clinched a 5–4 victory over Liverpool in the penalty shootout after the match was 1–1 after 90 minutes. On 1 November, Elneny put in an excellent display at the base of Arsenal's midfield alongside Thomas Partey to render Bruno Fernandes and Paul Pogba ineffective and earn Arsenal a first league win at Old Trafford since 2006. Elneny was praised by manager, Mikel Arteta after the game. While being away with Egypt during the International break in November 2020, it was confirmed by the Egyptian Football Association that Elneny tested positive for COVID-19 but showed no symptoms. After his return, he scored his first goal of the season in a 4–2 victory over Dundalk in the Europa League on 10 December. His strike outside the box was voted as the runner-up of the Goal of the Month on Arsenal's official website, also later on winning goal of the season. Elneny then scored another impressive goal versus Olympiacos on 11 March 2021, to keep Arsenal in the tie. On 2 May 2021, Elneny scored his first Premier League goal for Arsenal with a volley from the edge of the box in a game against Newcastle United. A year later, on 24 May 2022, he renewed his contract with Arsenal.

On 21 February 2023, Elneny signed a new one-and-a-half-year deal with the club.

On 17 May 2024, Elneny announced that he would be leaving Arsenal at the end of the season, after spending eight-and-a-half years with the club and being the club's then-longest-serving player.

=== Al Jazira ===
On 30 July 2024, Elneny joined Emirati side Al Jazira. In his debut season, he won the UAE League Cup and was voted UAE Pro League Player of the Season for 2024–25.

=== Levadiakos ===
On 29 September 2026, Elneny signed for Super League Greece club Levadiakos on a free transfer.

== International career ==
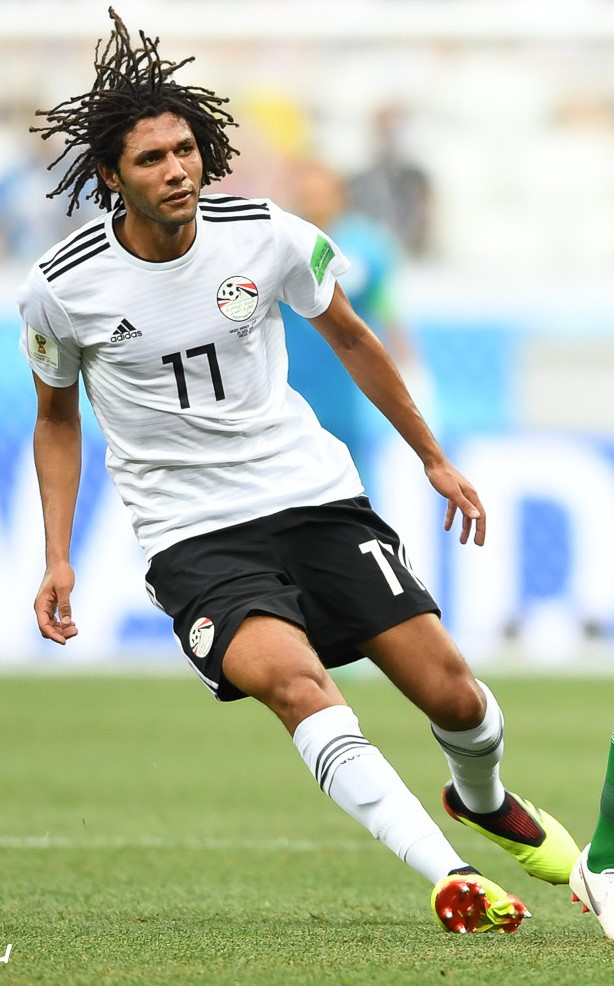
Elneny with Egypt in the 2018 FIFA World Cup

Elneny helped the national under-23 team qualify for the 2012 Olympics, where he played in all four games as the team reached the last eight, and were knocked out by Japan.

Elneny made his full international debut with the senior national team in a 2–1 loss against Sierra Leone in September 2011. He scored his first goal for Egypt in a 2–2 draw against Jamaica in a friendly on 4 June 2014.

He was in the Egypt national squad for the Africa Cup of Nations 2017 in Gabon, where the nation finished as runners-up. He also helped the team qualify to the 2018 FIFA World Cup tournament in Russia, this was the third time for the Egyptian national team to participate in the competition after the 1934 and 1990 editions.

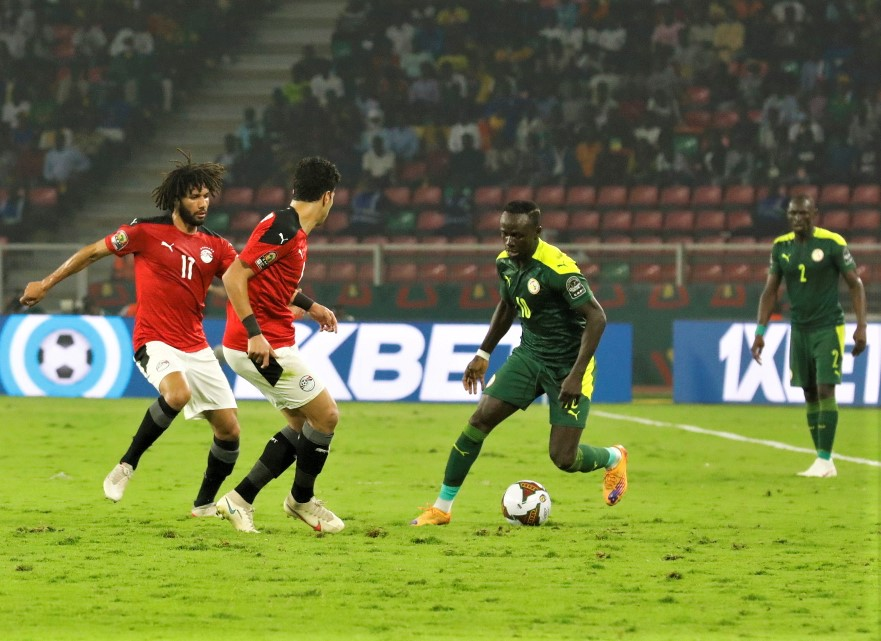
Elneny (far left) playing for Egypt at the 2021 Africa Cup of Nations

Elneny was selected by the Confederation of African Football (CAF) to feature in the 2021 Africa Cup of Nations (held in 2022) team of the tournament, after he helped his team reach the final of the competition. In December 2023, he was named in the 27-man squad for the 2023 Africa Cup of Nations in Ivory Coast. He earned his 100th international cap, including non-FIFA sanctioned matches, in a 2–2 draw against Ghana during the African tournament.

== Style of play ==
Elneny is recognised for his passing accuracy, long balls and possession-holding, and has been described as a player who controls the midfield; "physical, yet mobile – and able to break up play". Mark White of FourFourTwo wrote in 2022 that "Elneny has so far outlasted every last one of the new midfield generals that Arsenal thought would replace him."

== Outside football ==
Elneny was involved in the Amazon Original sports docuseries All or Nothing: Arsenal, which documented the club by spending time with the coaching staff and players behind the scenes both on and off the field throughout their 2021–22 season.

== Personal life ==
Elneny is a devout Muslim.

In July 2019, the body of a man, believed to be a thief attempting to steal electrical cables, was discovered on Elneny's property in El-Mahalla El-Kubra, Egypt. The body was discovered by his father, who immediately reported the incident to the police. It is believed that the man was electrocuted trying to steal the cables.

On 15 May 2021, Arsenal's sponsors Lavazza commenced "urgent talks" with the club after Elneny posted a tweet in support of Palestine during the 2021 Israel–Palestine crisis. This resulted in a response from the Board of Deputies of British Jews. Arsenal later issued a statement: "As with any employees of Arsenal, our players are entitled to express their views on their own platforms. That said, we are speaking to Mo about this so he understands the wider implications of his post … As a club we are committed to confronting and eliminating all forms of discrimination and continue to champion the need for equality and diversity across all areas of life." During the Gaza war, Elneny once again expressed his support for Palestine.

In 2024, Elneny founded his own football club, Elneny FC, who play in the Hertfordshire Senior County League.

== Career statistics ==
=== Club ===
As of match played 25 May 2025

Appearances and goals by club, season and competition
Club	Season	League			National cup (Note: Includes Swiss Cup, FA Cup, Turkish Cup, UAE President's Cup)		League cup (Note: Includes EFL Cup, UAE League Cup)		Continental		Other		Total	
Club	Season	Division	Apps	Goals	Apps	Goals	Apps	Goals	Apps	Goals	Apps	Goals	Apps	Goals
Al Mokawloon Al Arab	2010–11	Egyptian Premier League	21	2	0	0	—		—		—		21	2
Al Mokawloon Al Arab	2011–12	Egyptian Premier League	14	0	0	0	—		—		—		14	0
Al Mokawloon Al Arab	Total		35	2	0	0	—		—		—		35	2
Basel (loan)	2012–13	Swiss Super League	15	0	3	0	—		8 (Note: Appearance(s) in UEFA Europa League)	0	—		26	0
Basel	2013–14	Swiss Super League	32	1	4	0	—		12 (Note: Six appearances in UEFA Champions League, six appearances in UEFA Europa League)	0	—		48	1
Basel	2014–15	Swiss Super League	28	2	5	1	—		8 (Note: Appearance(s) in UEFA Champions League)	0	—		41	3
Basel	2015–16	Swiss Super League	16	2	2	1	—		9 (Note: Four appearances in UEFA Champions League, five appearances and two goals in UEFA Europa League)	2	—		27	5
Basel	Total		76	5	11	2	—		29	2	—		116	9
Arsenal	2015–16	Premier League	11	0	4	0	0	0	1	1	—		16	1
Arsenal	2016–17	Premier League	14	0	2	0	3	0	5	0	—		24	0
Arsenal	2017–18	Premier League	13	0	1	0	5	0	12	1	1 (Note: Appearance in FA Community Shield)	0	32	1
Arsenal	2018–19	Premier League	8	0	1	0	1	0	7	0	—		17	0
Arsenal	2020–21	Premier League	23	1	2	0	3	0	12	2	1	0	41	3
Arsenal	2021–22	Premier League	14	0	0	0	3	0	—		—		17	0
Arsenal	2022–23	Premier League	5	0	1	1	1	0	1	0	—		8	1
Arsenal	2023–24	Premier League	3	0	0	0	1	0	2	0	0	0	6	0
Arsenal	Total		91	1	11	1	17	0	40	4	2	0	161	6
Beşiktaş (loan)	2019–20	Süper Lig	27	1	3	0	—		6	0	—		36	1
Al Jazira	2024–25	UAE Pro League	24	1	3	0	6	0	—		—		33	1
Career total			268	10	31	3	23	0	83	6	2	0	407	19

=== International ===
As of match played 9 December 2025

Appearances and goals by national team and year
National team	Year	Apps	Goals
Egypt	2011	2	0
Egypt	2012	17	0
Egypt	2013	8	0
Egypt	2014	9	2
Egypt	2015	6	1
Egypt	2016	7	0
Egypt	2017	11	2
Egypt	2018	10	1
Egypt	2019	8	0
Egypt	2020	1	0
Egypt	2021	4	2
Egypt	2022	10	0
Egypt	2023	4	0
Egypt	2024	6	0
Egypt	2025	5	0
Total		108	8

As of match played 9 December 2025. Egypt score listed first, score column indicates score after each Elneny goal.

List of international goals scored by Mohamed Elneny
No.	Date	Venue	Opponent	Score	Result	Competition
1	4 June 2014	Brisbane Road, London, England	Jamaica	1–0	2–2	Friendly
2	10 October 2014	Botswana National Stadium, Gaborone, Botswana	Botswana	1–0	2–0	2015 Africa Cup of Nations qualification
3	17 November 2015	Borg El Arab Stadium, Alexandria, Egypt	Chad	1–0	4–0	2018 FIFA World Cup qualification
4	5 February 2017	Stade d'Angondjé, Libreville, Gabon	Cameroon	1–0	1–2	2017 Africa Cup of Nations final
5	28 March 2017	Borg El Arab Stadium, Alexandria, Egypt	Togo	3–0	3–0	Friendly
6	8 September 2018	Borg El Arab Stadium, Alexandria, Egypt	Niger	6–0	6–0	2019 Africa Cup of Nations qualification
7	29 March 2021	Cairo International Stadium, Cairo, Egypt	Comoros	1–0	4–0	2021 Africa Cup of Nations qualification
8	12 November 2021	Estádio 11 de Novembro, Luanda, Angola	Angola	1–2	2–2	2022 FIFA World Cup qualification

== Honours ==
Basel

- Swiss Super League: 2012–13, 2013–14, 2014–15, 2015–16

Arsenal

- FA Cup: 2016–17
- FA Community Shield: 2017, 2020
- EFL Cup runner-up: 2017–18
- UEFA Europa League runner-up: 2018–19

Al Jazira

- UAE League Cup: 2024–25

Egypt

- Africa Cup of Nations runner-up: 2017, 2021

Individual

- Africa Cup of Nations Team of the Tournament: 2021
- UAE Pro League Player of the Season: 2024–25

== See also ==
- List of men's footballers with 100 or more international caps
