= Préjuce Nakoulma =

Burkinabé footballer

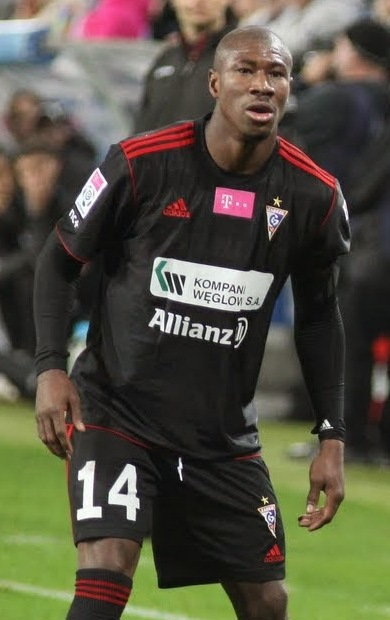
- Nakoulma with Górnik Zabrze in 2013

Personal information
- Full name: Niguimbe Préjuce Nakoulma
- Date of birth: 21 April 1987 (age 39)
- Place of birth: Ouagadougou, Burkina Faso
- Height: 1.78 m (5 ft 10 in)
- Positions: Winger; striker

Youth career
- CF Ouagadougou

Senior career*
Years	Team	Apps	(Gls)
2004–2005	CF Ouagadougou		
2006	Granica Lubycza Królewska		
2007	Hetman Zamość		
2007	Stal Stalowa Wola	16	(0)
2008	Hetman Zamość	14	(7)
2008–2012	Górnik Łęczna	61	(15)
2010–2011	→ Widzew Łódź (loan)	8	(1)
2011–2012	→ Górnik Zabrze (loan)	25	(9)
2012–2014	Górnik Zabrze	62	(15)
2014–2016	Mersin İdman Yurdu	58	(12)
2016	Kayserispor	13	(2)
2017–2018	Nantes	29	(9)
2019	Çaykur Rizespor	12	(2)
2020	Orléans	6	(1)
2021	Sautron		

International career
2012–2019	Burkina Faso	53	(13)
Medal record
Representing Burkina Faso
Africa Cup of Nations
Runner-up	2013 South Africa
Third place	2017 Gabon
- * Club domestic league appearances and goals

Niguimbe Préjuce Nakoulma (born 21 April 1987) is a Burkinabé former professional footballer who played as a striker.

== Club career ==
Nakoulma's former clubs were Stal Stalowa Wola and Hetman Zamość.

In July 2010, he was loaned to Widzew Łódź on a one-year deal. He returned to Łęczna one-year later, only to be immediately loaned to Górnik Zabrze, again on a one-year contract. After having scored 9 goals in the 2011–12 campaign while on loan, Nakoulma signed a permanent contract with Górnik Zabrze in July 2012.

On 17 July 2014, Nakoulma signed two-year contract with Turkish club Mersin İdman Yurdu.

After being released by Kayserispor Nakoulma signed for Ligue 1 side FC Nantes on 31 January 2017. In August 2018, he was released from his contract. In January 2019, Nakoulma signed for Çaykur Rizespor on a free transfer. He made his first appearance for Rizespor on 21 January as a substitute against Kasımpaşa. His first goal for Rizespor was scored on 27 January against Akhisar Belediyespor.

Nakoulma left Rizespor in the summer of 2019, and after six months without a club he signed for US Orléans in December 2019, on a contract until the end of the 2019–20. He left at the end of the contract.

== Career statistics ==
Scores and results list Burkina Faso's goal tally first, score column indicates score after each Nakoulma goal.

List of international goals scored by Préjuce Nakoulma
No.	Date	Venue	Opponent	Score	Result	Competition
1	26 May 2012	Stade du 4-Août, Ouagadougou, Burkina Faso	Benin	1–0	2–2	Friendly
2	26 May 2012	Stade du 4-Août, Ouagadougou, Burkina Faso	Benin	2–2	2–2	Friendly
3	23 March 2013	Stade du 4-Août, Ouagadougou, Burkina Faso	Niger	4–0	4–1	2014 FIFA World Cup qualification
4	7 September 2013	Stade du 4-Août, Ouagadougou, Burkina Faso	Gabon	1–0	1–0	2014 FIFA World Cup qualification
5	16 June 2015	Stade Olympique Yves-du-Manoir, Colombes, France	Cameroon	1–0	2–3	Friendly
6	12 November 2015	Stade de l'Amitié, Cotonou, Benin	Benin	1–1	1–2	2018 FIFA World Cup qualification
7	4 September 2016	Stade du 4-Août, Ouagadougou, Burkina Faso	Botswana	1–0	2–1	2017 Africa Cup of Nations qualification
8	12 November 2016	Estádio Nacional de Cabo Verde, Praia, Cape Verde	Cape Verde	2–0	2–0	2018 FIFA World Cup qualification
9	18 January 2017	Stade d'Angondjé, Libreville, Gabon	Gabon	1–0	1–1	2017 Africa Cup of Nations
10	28 January 2017	Stade d'Angondjé, Libreville, Gabon	Tunisia	2–0	2–0	2017 Africa Cup of Nations
11	14 November 2017	Stade du 4-Août, Ouagadougou, Burkina Faso	Cape Verde	1–0	4–0	2018 FIFA World Cup qualification
12	14 November 2017	Stade du 4-Août, Ouagadougou, Burkina Faso	Cape Verde	2–0	4–0	2018 FIFA World Cup qualification
13	14 November 2017	Stade du 4-Août, Ouagadougou, Burkina Faso	Cape Verde	3–0	4–0	2018 FIFA World Cup qualification

== Honours ==
Burkina Faso

- Africa Cup of Nations runner-up: 2013
- Africa Cup of Nations third place: 2017

Individual

- Ekstraklasa Player of the Month: November 2011
