= Nani Soares =

Bissau-Guinean footballer

Personal information
- Full name: Nanissio Justino Mendes Soares
- Date of birth: 17 September 1991 (age 35)
- Place of birth: Bissau, Guinea-Bissau
- Height: 1.88 m (6 ft 2 in)
- Positions: Defender; midfielder

Team information
- Current team: AEZ Zakakiou
- Number: 31

Senior career*
Years	Team	Apps	(Gls)
2013–2014	Naval	16	(1)
2014–2015	Trofense	49	(2)
2015–2016	Gil Vicente	9	(0)
2016–2018	Felgueiras 1932	54	(1)
2018–2023	Olympiakos Nicosia	75	(3)
2024-2025	Peyia 2014	12	(0)
2025-	AEZ Zakakiou	28	(2)

International career^{‡}
2016–	Guinea Bissau	2	(0)
- * Club domestic league appearances and goals as of 3 May 2026 ‡ National team caps and goals as of 14 January 2017

Nanissio Justino Mendes Soares (born 17 September 1991), better known as Nani, is a Bissau-Guinean footballer who played for AEZ Zakakiou as a midfielder.

== International career ==
Nani was called up to the Guinea-Bissau national team for the 2017 Africa Cup of Nations qualification matches against Kenya in March 2016.
