= Rudinilson Silva =

Bissau-Guinean footballer

Personal information
- Full name: Rudinilson Gomes Brito Silva
- Date of birth: 20 August 1994 (age 32)
- Place of birth: Bissau, Guinea-Bissau
- Height: 1.80 m (5 ft 11 in)
- Position: Centre-back

Youth career
- 2010–2011: Sporting CP
- 2011–2013: Benfica

Senior career*
Years	Team	Apps	(Gls)
2013–2014	Benfica B	19	(0)
2014–2016	Lechia Gdańsk	5	(0)
2014–2016	Lechia Gdańsk II	39	(0)
2017	Utenis Utena	12	(0)
2017–2018	OC Khouribga	8	(0)
2019–2021	Kauno Žalgiris	46	(2)
2022	Wigry Suwałki	13	(1)
2022	KTP	9	(1)

International career
2012	Portugal U18	2	(0)
2012–2013	Portugal U19	15	(0)
2013	Portugal U20	1	(0)
2014–2021	Guinea-Bissau	22	(0)
- * Club domestic league appearances and goals as of 8 October 2022

Rudinilson Gomes Brito Silva (born 20 August 1994) is a Bissau-Guinean professional footballer who plays as a centre-back.

== Club career ==
On 18 September 2013, Rudinilson made his professional debut with Benfica B in a 2013–14 Segunda Liga match against Aves.

On 22 August 2014, he joined Lechia Gdańsk in Poland.

On 22 February 2017, Rudinilson signed a two-year deal with Lithuanian A Lyga club FK Utenis Utena. In August that year, he moved to Moroccan side OC Khouribga.

In early 2019, Rudinilson returned to Lithuania and signed with FK Kauno Žalgiris.

On 1 February 2022, he moved back to Poland and joined II liga side Wigry Suwałki until the end of the season, with an extension option.

On 21 July 2022, he joined Finnish club KTP.

== International career ==
Having previously represented Portugal at multiple youth levels, Rudinilson made his senior international debut for Guinea-Bissau on 19 July 2014.

== Career statistics ==
=== Club ===
As of 26 February 2025

Appearances and goals by club, season and competition
Club	Season	League			National cup (Note: Includes Polish Cup and Lithuanian Cup)		Continental		Total	
Club	Season	Division	Apps	Goals	Apps	Goals	Apps	Goals	Apps	Goals
Benfica B	2013–14	LigaPro	19	0	–		–		19	0
Lechia Gdańsk	2014–15	Ekstraklasa	4	0	0	0	–		4	0
Lechia Gdańsk	2015–16	Ekstraklasa	1	0	1	0	–		2	0
Lechia Gdańsk	Total		5	0	1	0	0	0	6	0
Lechia Gdańsk II	2014–15	III liga	18	0	–		–		18	0
Lechia Gdańsk II	2015–16	III liga	21	0	–		–		21	0
Lechia Gdańsk II	Total		39	0	0	0	0	0	39	0
Utenis Utena	2017	A Lyga	12	0	–		–		12	0
OC Khouribga	2017–18	Botola Pro	8	0	–		–		8	0
Kauno Žalgiris	2019	A Lyga	16	0	1	0	2 (Note: Appearances in UEFA Europa League)	0	19	0
Kauno Žalgiris	2020	A Lyga	17	0	1	0	1	0	19	0
Kauno Žalgiris	2021	A Lyga	13	2	0	0	1 (Note: Appearance(s) in UEFA Conference League)	0	14	2
Kauno Žalgiris	Total		46	2	2	0	4	0	52	2
Kauno Žalgiris B	2021	I Lyga	1	0	–		–		1	0
Wigry Suwałki	2021–22	II liga	13	1	–		–		13	1
KTP	2022	Ykkönen	9	1	–		–		9	1
Career total			152	4	3	0	4	0	159	4

=== International ===
As of match played 6 October 2021

Appearances and goals by national team and year
National team	Year	Apps	Goals
Guinea-Bissau
Guinea-Bissau	2014	1	0
Guinea-Bissau	2015	0	0
Guinea-Bissau	2016	4	0
Guinea-Bissau	2017	5	0
Guinea-Bissau	2018	3	0
Guinea-Bissau	2019	5	0
Guinea-Bissau	2020	1	0
Guinea-Bissau	2021	3	0
Total		22	0
