= Estádio Lino Correia =

- Interactive map of Estádio Lino Correia
- Location: Bissau, Guinea-Bissau
- Coordinates: 11.860203°N 15.586389°W
- Capacity: 12,000

Tenant
- Estrela Negra de Bissau

Estádio Lino Correia is a multi-use stadium in Bissau, Guinea Bissau. It is currently used mostly for football matches and serves as the stadium of Estrela Negra de Bissau of the Campeonato Nacional da Guiné-Bissau. The stadium holds 12,000 spectators.
