= Estrela Negra de Bissau =

- Full name: Estrela Negra de Bissau
- Founded: 5 April 1975
- Ground: Estádio Lino Correia; Bissau, Guinea-Bissau
- Capacity: 5,000
- League: Campeonato Nacional da Guiné-Bissau
- 2014: 8th

Estrela Negra de Bissau, usually known simply as Estrela Negra, is a traditional football (soccer) club based in Bissau, Guinea-Bissau.

The club was founded on 5 April 1975.

== Stadium ==
The club plays their home matches at Estádio Lino Correia, which has a maximum capacity of 10,000 people.
