= Jonas Mendes =

Bissau-Guinean footballer (born 1989)

Jonas
Personal information
- Full name: Jonas Asvedo Mendes
- Date of birth: 20 November 1989 (age 36)
- Place of birth: Bissau, Guinea-Bissau
- Height: 1.91 m (6 ft 3 in)
- Position: Goalkeeper

Team information
- Current team: Zürich City SC
- Number: 77

Senior career*
| Years | Team | Apps | (Gls) |
| 2007–2011 | Amora | 16 | (0) |
| 2011–2013 | Beira-Mar | 3 | (0) |
| 2013–2014 | Atlético CP | 6 | (0) |
| 2015–2016 | Vianense | 31 | (0) |
| 2016 | Vizela | 7 | (0) |
| 2016–2017 | Salgueiros | 24 | (0) |
| 2017–2019 | Académico Viseu | 24 | (0) |
| 2019–2021 | Black Leopards | 34 | (0) |
| 2022 | Zakynthos | 14 | (0) |
| 2022–2025 | Kalamata | 13 | (0) |
| 2025– | Zürich City SC | 5 | (0) |

International career^{‡}
| 2010– | Guinea-Bissau | 60 | (0) |
- * Club domestic league appearances and goals as of 8 November 2025 ‡ National team caps and goals as of 25 March 2024

Jonas Asvedo Mendes (born 20 November 1989) is a Bissau-Guinean professional footballer who plays as a goalkeeper for Swiss 2. Liga club Zürich City SC and Guinea-Bissau national football team.

Raised in Portugal, he played three Primeira Liga games for Beira-Mar, and 30 in the second tier for Atlético CP and Académico Viseu, while spending most of his career in the third division.

A full international with over 51 caps for Guinea-Bissau since 2010, he represented the country at the Africa Cup of Nations in 2017, 2019 and 2021.

== Club career ==
Born in Bissau, and raised in Quinta da Princesa, Seixal, Mendes began his career in Portugal's lower leagues with Amora F.C. and joined Primeira Liga club S.C. Beira-Mar in 2011. Due to Rui Rêgo's injury, he played three games in January 2012, starting with a 2–1 loss at S.C. Olhanense.

Mendes moved in 2013 to Atlético Clube de Portugal of the Segunda Liga, where he was rarely used. In the ensuing years, he played in the third-tier Campeonato de Portugal for SC Vianense, F.C. Vizela and S.C. Salgueiros. He won promotion with Vizela in 2016, though not as first choice.

In June 2017, Mendes returned to the second division with Académico de Viseu FC. He played the majority of games in his second season, after the exit of Brazilian veteran Peterson Peçanha.

Mendes left Portugal for the first time in his career in July 2019, to join Black Leopards F.C. of the South African Premier Division. He left two years later at the end of his contract, having turned down a deal to carry on after relegation for the sake of his international prospects.

== International career ==
Mendes made his international debut for Guinea-Bissau on 16 November 2010 in a 2–1 friendly loss to Cape Verde at the Estádio do Restelo in Lisbon. He was called up for the 2017 Africa Cup of Nations in Gabon and the 2019 edition in Egypt, and played all three games of both group-stage eliminations, as well as being picked for the 2021 tournament.
