= Elydjah Mendy =

French-Bissau-Guinean footballer (born 2000)

Personal information
- Full name: Elydjah Tobo Rémy Gaspard Mendy
- Date of birth: 14 March 2000 (age 26)
- Place of birth: Pau, France
- Height: 1.93 m (6 ft 4 in)
- Position: Centre-back

Team information
- Current team: Nancy
- Number: 21

Youth career
- –2018: Pau FC

Senior career*
Years	Team	Apps	(Gls)
2018–2021	Pau FC B	24	(0)
2021–2024	Libourne	68	(15)
2024–2025	Dijon	20	(2)
2025–	Nancy	21	(2)
- * Club domestic league appearances and goals as of 12 May 2026

Elydjah Tobo Rémy Gaspard Mendy (born 14 March 2000) is a Bissau-Guinean professional footballer who plays as a centre-back for Ligue 2 club Nancy.

== Early career ==
Elydjah Mendy was born in Pau, France, and developed in the youth academy of Pau FC. He trained with the first team during the 2020–21 pre-season, but head coach Didier Tholot did not retain him for Pau's debut season in Ligue 2. Consequently, he spent that season with the reserve team in Régional 1.

== Club career ==
In 2021, Mendy signed for Libourne, where he spent three seasons. At Libourne, he progressed steadily and contributed to the club's promotion to Championnat National 2 in 2023.

In July 2024, Mendy was signed by Dijon on a free transfer, then competing in the Championnat National. He made 18 league appearances and scored two goals during the 2024–25 season, including matches against Nancy, who went on to win the title.

On 27 August 2025, Mendy joined Nancy on a three-year contract, running until June 2028.

== Style of play ==
Standing at 1.93 metres, Mendy is a left-footed defender, mainly used as a centre-back but also capable of playing as a left-back.

== Personal life ==
Born in France, Mendy holds both French and Bissau-Guinean nationality.
