= Baciro Candé =

Bissau-Guinean footballer and manager

Personal information
- Date of birth: 6 April 1967 (age 59)
- Place of birth: Catió, Guinea-Bissau
- Position: Defender

Youth career
- 1981–1982: Juventude União
- 1982–1983: Real Massamá
- 1983–1984: Casa Pia

Senior career*
Years	Team	Apps	(Gls)
1984–1985	Estoril		
1985–1986	Rio Maior		
1986–1987	Estrela da Amadora		
1987–1988	Amora		

International career
- Guinea-Bissau

Managerial career
- 1989: Desportivo de Farim
- 1989–1990: UDIB
- 1990–1991: Bula
- 1991–1992: Estrela Negra
- 1992–1993: Ajuda
- 1995–2007: Sporting de Bissau
- 2001–2010: Guinea-Bissau
- 2000–2013: Oeiras (youth)
- 2013–2014: Oeiras
- 2014–2015: Sporting de Bissau
- 2016–2024: Guinea-Bissau
- * Club domestic league appearances and goals

Baciro Candé (born 6 April 1967) is a Bissau-Guinean professional football player and manager.

== Career ==
Candé was born in Catió. He played professional football in Portugal's Segunda Liga as a defender with Estrela da Amadora and Amora.

After he retired from playing, Candé became a football coach. He began managing in Guinea-Bissau with Desportivo de Farim, U.D.I.B, Bula Futebol Clube, Estrela Negra de Bissau and Ajuda Sport Clube, and won the 1988–89 Taça Nacional da Guiné Bissau with Desportivo de Farim. Next, he spent several years managing Sporting Clube de Bissau, winning nine league titles with the club.

Since 2003 until 2010 he coached the Guinea-Bissau national team. He returned as head coach of the national team in March 2016.
