= Guinea-Bissau national football team =

Men's association football team

Guinea-Bissau
- Nickname(s): Djurtus; Os Dromedários (The Dromedaries)
- Association: Federação de Futebol da Guiné-Bissau (FFGB)
- Confederation: CAF (Africa)
- Sub-confederation: WAFU (West Africa)
- Head coach: Emiliano Té
- Captain: Sori Mané
- Most caps: Jonas Mendes (60)
- Top scorer: Mama Baldé (10)
- Home stadium: Estádio 24 de Setembro; Estádio Lino Correia
- FIFA code: GNB
First colours	Second colours	Third colours

FIFA ranking
- Current: 124 ▲8 (7 October 2026)
- Highest: 68 (November 2016–January 2017)
- Lowest: 195 (February–March 2010)

First international
- British Gambia 1–3 Portuguese Guinea (British Gambia; June 2, 1952)

Biggest win
- Guinea-Bissau 7–2 Benin (Bamako, Mali; 3 November 2001)

Biggest defeat
- Guinea 7–0 Guinea-Bissau (Conakry, Guinea; 22 July 2017)

Africa Cup of Nations
- Appearances: 4 (first in 2017)
- Best result: Group stage (2017, 2019, 2021 and 2023)

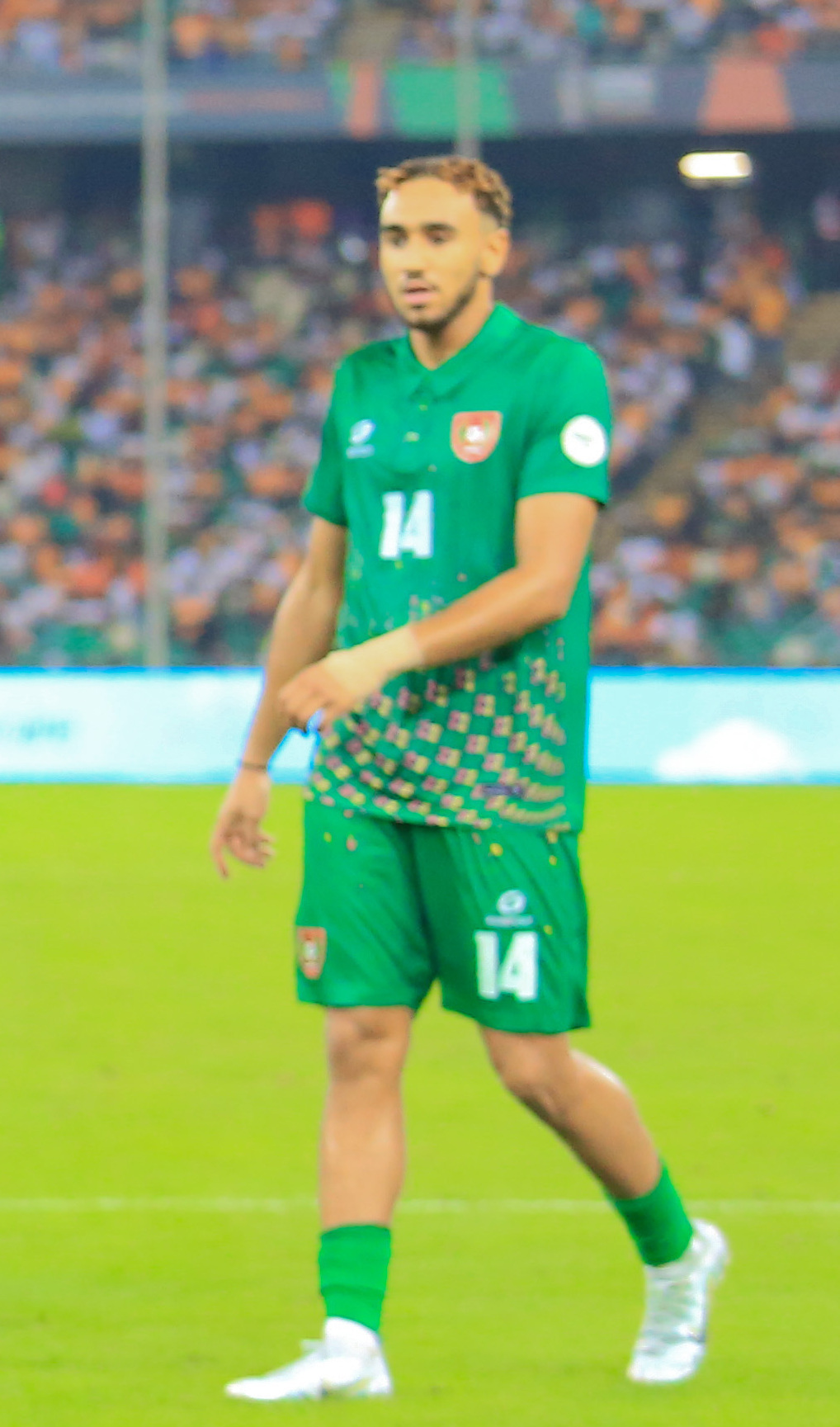
Mauro Rodrigues played numerous matches for the Guinea-Bissau national football team

The Guinea-Bissau national football team (Portuguese: Seleção nacional de futebol da Guiné-Bissau) represents Guinea-Bissau in men's international association football and it is controlled by the Football Federation of Guinea-Bissau, The team has never qualified for the FIFA World Cups but qualified for the Africa Cup of Nations four times, making their debut in 2017. The team is a member of both FIFA and Confederation of African Football (CAF).

== History ==
=== World Cup qualifying ===
Guinea-Bissau entered their first FIFA World Cup qualification with the aim of reaching the 1998 World Cup in France. The first round of African qualification required for them to play Guinea in a two-legged match. The first leg was held at home in the Estadio 24 de Setembro in Bissau on 1 June 1996 with an attendance of 15,000. Guinea-Bissau went 2–0 up at half-time after strikes from Pereira Tavares in 11th and 36th minutes. Guinea's Titi Camara equalised with his own brace in the 53rd and 54th minutes. Guinea-Bissau's Co Cipriano won the game with a 60th-minute penalty to make it 3–2. The away leg was held at the Stade du 28 Septembre in Conakry. Momo Soumah of Guinea scored to level the tie at half-time before Nando Có scored a bicycle kick for Guinea-Bissau to put his side 4–3 up on aggregate, however another goal from Momo Soumah and a winner from Tibou Bangoura won the match for Guinea, giving them a 5–4 lead on aggregate.

Guinea-Bissau had never progressed beyond the first round of qualification until the 2022 qualifiers where they defeated São Tomé and Príncipe 3–1 over two legs, thanks to three goals from Joseph Mendes.

=== Africa Cup of Nations ===
Guinea-Bissau first participated in AFCON qualification in 1994 where they defeated Cape Verde over three legs, but failed to register a single point in the second round as their draw against Togo was annulled after Togo withdrew from the competition. In 1996 Guinea-Bissau withdrew from qualification after a draw and two losses to begin the campaign, leading to their ban for 1998 AFCON.

Guinea-Bissau next entered qualification in 2006 where they lost 4–1 to Mali national football team and were again banned in 2008 for unpaid debts to CAF. In 2012 they secured a single win (1–0 against Kenya) and five losses to finish last in Group J. The following year they were eliminated 2–0 by Cameroon. In 2015, after beating Central African Republic 3–1, they lost to Botswana by the same scoreline.

For the 2017 qualifiers, Guinea-Bissau was drawn from Pot 4 into Group E and, despite being the lowest ranked nation in their group, achieved ten points and qualified for the 2017 tournament ahead of Congo, Zambia and Kenya. In their African Cup of Nations debut, Guinea-Bissau drew 1–1 with Gabon with a 91st-minute equaliser by Juary Soares. This was the only point they collected at the tournament and they were eliminated in the group stage.

Guinea-Bissau then also won their Group in the 2019 qualifiers to reach a second straight Finals. They again managed one draw (0–0 against Benin) and two losses and failed to progress to the knock-out stages.

On March 30, 2021, Guinea-Bissau went into their final qualifying match against Congo, needing a victory to qualify. They ended comfortable winners with goals from Piqueti, Frédéric Mendy and Jorginho to secure their third successive AFCON appearance.

== Results and fixtures ==
The following is a list of match results in the last 12 months, as well as any future matches that have been scheduled.

Win Draw Loss Fixture

=== 2026 ===
28 March Friendly	Burkina Faso	5–0	Guinea-Bissau	Ouagadougou, Burkina Faso
19:00 UTC+1	P. Kaboré 26'; Ouattara 40'; M. Kaboré 61', 73', 88'	Report		Stadium: Stade du 4 Août; Referee: Moussa Ahamadou Alou (Niger)

31 March Friendly	Burkina Faso	1–1	Guinea-Bissau	Ouagadougou, Burkina Faso
18:00 UTC+0	Nagalo 85'	Report	F. Gomes 90+7'	Stadium: Stade du 4 Août

25 September 2027 AFCON qualification	Tanzania	0−2	Guinea-Bissau	Zanzibar City, Tanzania
16:00 UTC+3		Report	Franculino 33'; Mam. Baldé 58'	Stadium: Amaan Stadium; Referee: Brighton Chimene (Zimbabwe)

29 September 2027 AFCON qualification	Guinea-Bissau	3−0	Nigeria	Bissau, Guinea-Bissau
16:00 UTC+0	Franculino 15'; Mam. Baldé 66'; Á. Djaló 90+5'	Report		Stadium: Estádio 24 de Setembro; Referee: Tewodros Mitiku (Ethiopia)

12 November 2027 AFCON qualification	Madagascar	1–1	Guinea-Bissau	Meknes, Morocco
16:00 UTC+0	Caddy 59'	Report	Nhaga 84'	Stadium: Meknes Honor Stadium; Referee: Samuel Uwikunda (Rwanda)

15 November 2027 AFCON qualification	Guinea-Bissau	2–0	Madagascar	Bissau, Guinea-Bissau
17:00 UTC+0	Mam. Baldé 32'; Rodrigues 70'	Report		Stadium: 24 September Stadium; Referee: Mohamed Diraneh (Djibouti)

=== 2027 ===
24 March 2027 AFCON qualification	Guinea-Bissau	v	Tanzania	TBD, Guinea-Bissau
TBD				Stadium: TBD

28 March 2027 AFCON qualification	Nigeria	v	Guinea-Bissau	TBD, Nigeria
TBD				Stadium: TBD

== Coaching staff ==
Position	Name
Head coach	(Portugal) Luis Boa Morte
Assistant coaches	(Guinea-Bissau) Domingos Indjai (Guinea-Bissau) Filipe Sambu
Fitness coach	(Guinea-Bissau) Mustafá Danfa
Goalkeeper coach	(Guinea-Bissau) Augusto Yansané
Team doctors	(Guinea-Bissau) Dr. Raimundo Djabaté (Guinea-Bissau) Dr. Francisco Djoró
Physiotherapists	(Guinea-Bissau) Leopoldo Kanté (Guinea-Bissau) Vasco Saidú (Guinea-Bissau) Vítor Djaló (Guinea-Bissau) Gilson Baldé
Match analyst	(Guinea-Bissau) Lucrécio Sané

=== Coaching history ===
- (Portugal) Guilherme Farinha (1990–1994)
- (Guinea-Bissau) Armando Antonio Miranda (2000)
- (Guinea-Bissau) Baciro Candé (2001–2009)
- (Portugal) Luís Norton de Matos (2010–2012)
- (Portugal) Carlos Manuel (2012–2014)
- (Portugal) Paulo Torres (2014–2016)
- (Guinea-Bissau) Baciro Candé (2016–2024)
- (Portugal) Luís Boa Morte (2024–2025)
- (Guinea-Bissau) Emiliano Té (2025–present)

== Players ==
=== Current squad ===
The following players were selected for the 2027 Africa Cup of Nations qualification matches against Madagascar on 11 and 15 November 2026.

Caps and goals correct as of 17 November 2026, after the second match against Madagascar.

No.	Pos.	Player	Date of birth (age)	Caps	Goals	Club
	GK	Manuel Baldé	14 November 2002 (age 24)	18	0	(Portuguese Football Federation) C.D. Trofense
	GK	Fernando Embadje	6 July 2003 (age 23)	7	0	(Royal Spanish Football Federation) Lugo
	GK	Manuel Issufe Djaló	4 August 2001 (age 25)	2	0	(Malta Football Association) Balzan
	DF	Opa Sanganté	1 February 1991 (age 35)	41	0	(French Football Federation) Dunkerque
	DF	Jefferson Encada	17 April 1998 (age 28)	37	0	(Portuguese Football Federation) Estrela da Amadora
	DF	Mauro Rodrigues	15 April 2001 (age 25)	29	3	(Bulgarian Football Union) Botev Plovdiv
	DF	Víctor Rofino	28 July 2002 (age 24)	12	0	(Portuguese Football Federation) Famalicão
	DF	Adramane Cassamá	16 January 2004 (age 22)	6	0	(Football Association of Finland) Oulu
	DF	Iano Imbeni	2 February 1999 (age 27)	6	1	(Portuguese Football Federation) Penafiel
	DF	Gilberto Batista	29 December 2003 (age 22)	3	0	(Portuguese Football Federation) Moreirense
	DF	Fallou Mendy	26 April 2000 (age 26)	0	0	(Royal Moroccan Football Federation) FAR Rabat
	MF	Bura Nogueira	22 December 1995 (age 30)	42	2	(Portuguese Football Federation) Lusitano de Évora
	MF	Alfa Semedo	30 August 1997 (age 29)	38	2	(Saudi Arabian Football Federation) Al-Fayha
	MF	Dálcio	22 May 1996 (age 30)	33	0	(Cyprus Football Association) APOEL
	MF	Renato Nhaga	23 March 2007 (age 19)	12	1	(Turkish Football Federation) Galatasaray
	MF	Mamadi Camará	31 December 2003 (age 22)	11	0	(Turkish Football Federation) Kayserispor
	MF	Panutche Camará	28 February 1997 (age 29)	8	1	(Scottish Football Association) Dundee United
	MF	Ronaldo Vieira	19 July 1998 (age 28)	7	0	(United States Soccer Federation) San Jose Earthquakes
	FW	Mama Baldé	6 November 1995 (age 31)	41	10	(French Football Federation) Brest
	FW	Beto	31 January 1998 (age 28)	14	1	(Italian Football Federation) Fiorentina
	FW	Tamble Monteiro	15 November 2000 (age 26)	13	1	(Portuguese Football Federation) Rio Ave
	FW	Steve Ambri	12 August 1997 (age 29)	5	0	(Cyprus Football Association) Omonia 29M
	FW	Álvaro Djaló	16 August 1999 (age 27)	7	1	(Royal Spanish Football Federation) Athletic Bilbao
	FW	Flávio Silva	3 April 1996 (age 30)	3	0	(South African Football Association) Kaizer Chiefs
	FW	Flinto Costa	9 March 2007 (age 19)	2	0	(Portuguese Football Federation) Braga B

=== Recent call-ups ===
The following players have been called up for Guinea-Bissau in the last 12 months.

Pos.	Player	Date of birth (age)	Caps	Goals	Club	Latest call-up
DF	Elydjah Mendy	14 March 2000 (age 26)	0	0	(France) Nancy	v. Nigeria, 29 September 2026
FW	Franculino Djú	28 June 2004 (age 22)	18	3	(Turkey) Trabzonspor	v. Nigeria, 29 September 2026
FW	Dânio Djassi	21 September 2006 (age 20)	0	0	(Portugal) Portimonense	v. Nigeria, 29 September 2026
^{DEC} Player refused to join the team after the call-up.^{INJ} Player withdrew from the squad due to an injury.^{PRE} Preliminary squad.^{RET} Player has retired from international football.^{SUS} Suspended from the national team.^{WD} Withdrew from squad.

== Records ==
As of 29 September 2026
Players in bold are still active with Guinea Bissau.

=== Most appearances ===
Rank	Player	Caps	Goals	Career
1	**Jonas Mendes**	60	0	2010–present
2	**Sori Mané**	51	0	2017–present
3	**Bura Nogueira**	41	2	2015–present
4	Piqueti	40	7	2015–2023
5	**Mama Baldé**	39	9	2019–present
5	**Opa Sanganté**	39	0	2020–present
7	**Alfa Semedo**	38	2	2021–present
8	Lino	36	2	1994–2001
9	**Jefferson Encada**	35	0	2021–present
10	Zezinho	34	2	2010–2019

=== Top goalscorers ===
Rank	Player	Goals	Caps	Ratio	Career
1	Nando Có	9	6	1.5	1996–2001
1	**Mama Baldé**	9	39	0.23	2019–present
3	Piqueti	7	40	0.18	2015–2023
4	Cícero Semedo	6	14	0.43	2010–2016
4	Frédéric Mendy	6	24	0.25	2016–2022
6	**Jorginho**	5	29	0.17	2018–present
7	Zinho Gano	4	7	0.57	2022–2024
7	Joseph Mendes	4	14	0.29	2019–2022
9	Yuri	3	5	0.6	1994–1996
9	Basile de Carvalho	3	8	0.38	2011–2012
9	**Franculino Djú**	3	18	0.17	2023–present
9	Toni Silva	3	22	0.14	2016–2024

== Competition records ==
=== FIFA World Cup ===
FIFA World Cup record									Qualification record					
Year	Round	Position	Pld	W	D*	L	GF	GA	Pld	W	D	L	GF	GA
1930 to 1974	Part of Portugal								Part of Portugal					
1978 to 1986	Not a FIFA member								Not a FIFA member					
1990 and 1994	Did not enter								Declined participation					
(France) 1998	Did not qualify								2	1	0	1	4	5
(South Korea) (Japan) 2002	Did not qualify								2	0	1	1	0	3
(Germany) 2006	Did not qualify								2	0	0	2	1	4
(South Africa) 2010	Did not qualify								2	0	1	1	0	1
(Brazil) 2014	Did not qualify								2	0	1	1	1	2
(Russia) 2018	Did not qualify								2	0	1	1	2	4
(Qatar) 2022	Did not qualify								8	3	3	2	8	12
(Canada) (Mexico) (United States) 2026	Did not qualify								10	2	4	4	8	10
(Morocco) (Portugal) (Spain) 2030	To be determined								To be determined					
(Saudi Arabia) 2034	To be determined								To be determined					
Total		0/9							30	6	11	13	24	41

=== Africa Cup of Nations ===
Africa Cup of Nations record									Qualification record					
Year	Round	Position	Pld	W	D*	L	GF	GA	Pld	W	D*	L	GF	GA
(Sudan) 1957	Part of Portugal								Part of Portugal					
(United Arab Republic) 1959	Part of Portugal								Part of Portugal					
(Ethiopia) 1962	Part of Portugal								Part of Portugal					
(Ghana) 1963	Part of Portugal								Part of Portugal					
(Tunisia) 1965	Part of Portugal								Part of Portugal					
(Ethiopia) 1968	Part of Portugal								Part of Portugal					
(Sudan) 1970	Part of Portugal								Part of Portugal					
(Cameroon) 1972	Part of Portugal								Part of Portugal					
(Egypt) 1974	Part of Portugal								Part of Portugal					
(Ethiopia) 1976	Not affiliated to CAF								Not affiliated to CAF					
(Ghana) 1978	Not affiliated to CAF								Not affiliated to CAF					
(Nigeria) 1980	Not affiliated to CAF								Not affiliated to CAF					
(Libya) 1982	Not affiliated to CAF								Not affiliated to CAF					
(Ivory Coast) 1984	Not affiliated to CAF								Not affiliated to CAF					
(Egypt) 1986	Not affiliated to CAF								Not affiliated to CAF					
(Morocco) 1988	Did not enter								Did not enter					
(Algeria) 1990	Did not enter								Did not enter					
(Senegal) 1992	Did not enter								Did not enter					
(Tunisia) 1994	Did not qualify								8	2	0	8	6	20
(South Africa) 1996	Withdrew during qualifying								Withdrew					
(Burkina Faso) 1998	Banned for withdrawing in 1996								Banned					
(Ghana) (Nigeria) 2000	Did not enter								Did not enter					
(Mali) 2002	Withdrew								Withdrew					
(Tunisia) 2004	Withdrew								Withdrew					
(Egypt) 2006	Did not qualify								2	0	0	2	1	4
(Ghana) 2008	Did not enter								Did not enter					
(Angola) 2010	Did not qualify								2	0	1	1	0	1
(Gabon) (Equatorial Guinea) 2012	Did not qualify								6	1	0	5	2	8
(South Africa) 2013	Did not qualify								2	0	1	1	0	2
(Equatorial Guinea) 2015	Did not qualify								4	4	2	2	6	3
(Gabon) 2017	Group stage	14th	3	0	1	2	2	5	6	3	1	2	7	7
(Egypt) 2019	Group stage	20th	3	0	1	2	0	4	6	2	3	1	8	7
(Cameroon) 2021	Group stage	22nd	3	0	1	2	0	3	6	3	0	3	9	7
(Ivory Coast) 2023	Group stage	23rd	3	0	0	3	2	7	6	4	1	1	11	5
(Morocco) 2025	Did not qualify								6	1	2	3	4	6
(Kenya) (Tanzania) (Uganda) 2027	To be determined								To be determined					
2029	To be determined								To be determined					
Total	Group stage	4/35	12	0	3	9	4	19	54	20	11	29	54	70

== Honours ==
=== Regional ===
- Amilcar Cabral Cup
  - (silver) Runners-up (1): 1983
