= Stade d'Angondjé =

Stadium in Libreville, Gabon

Stade de l’Amitié sino-gabonaise
- Stade d'Angondjé
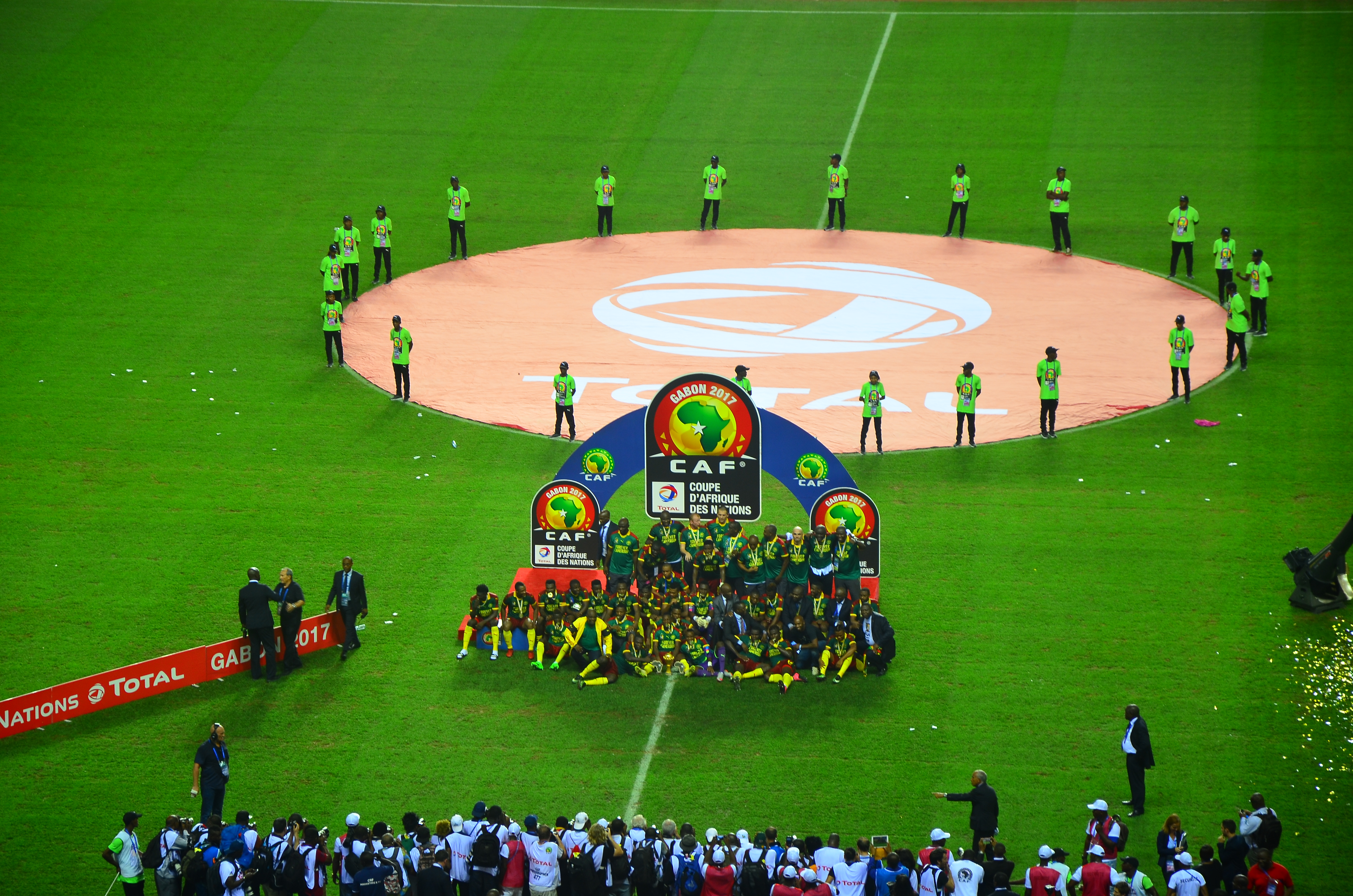
- Interactive map of Stade de l’Amitié sino-gabonaise
- Location: Angondjé, Libreville, Gabon
- Coordinates: 0°31′20″N 9°23′36″E
- Owner: National Office for the Development of Sport and Culture (ONDSC)
- Capacity: 40,000

Construction
- Groundbreaking: 21 April 2010
- Built: 2011
- Opened: November 10, 2011
- Main contractor: Shanghai Construction

Tenant
- Gabon national football team (selected matches)

The Stade de l’Amitié sino-gabonaise is a stadium in Angondjé, a suburb of Libreville in Gabon. It is referred to as Stade de l'Amitié. The stadium build was expected to take 20 months and was funded by the Gabonese and Chinese governments.

It was one of four stadiums used for the 2012 Africa Cup of Nations and hosted the competition final. The inaugural football match played here was Gabon facing off against Brazil, who won that match 2–0. It also was one of four Gabonese stadia used for the 2017 Africa Cup of Nations and hosted the competition's final.

== History ==
The symbolic laying of the foundation stone was made by the Gabonese Sports Minister Rene Ndemezo’Obiang and the Chinese Vice Minister Fu Ziying in April 2010. This stadium was constructed by China and was built on a 30-hectare area by the Chinese company Shanghai Construction Group. The work was entirely funded by China while Gabon developed the site, including bringing water and electricity, and building access roads.

The stadium was used for the inauguration of President Brice Oligui Nguema on 3 May 2025.

== Ownership ==
After the 2017 AFCON, the company created for managing the stadiums built for the 2012 and 2017 editions was liquidated and the ownership of the venue was transferred to the National Office for the Development of Sport and Culture (ONDSC).

== Notes ==
Preceded by Estádio 11 de Novembro; Luanda	Africa Cup of Nations; Final venue 2012	Succeeded by FNB Stadium; Johannesburg
Preceded by Estadio de Bata; Bata	Africa Cup of Nations; Final venue 2017	Succeeded by Cairo International Stadium; Cairo
