= 2017 Africa Cup of Nations knockout stage =

Football tournament stage

The knockout stage of the 2017 Africa Cup of Nations took place from 28 January to the final on 5 February 2017 in Gabon.

In the knockout stages, if a match was level at the end of normal playing time, extra time was played (two periods of 15 minutes each) and followed, if necessary, by a penalty shoot-out to determine the winner, except for the third place play-off, where no extra time was played and the match went directly to penalties if level.

All times are local, WAT (UTC+1).

== Qualified teams ==
The top two placed teams from each of the four groups advanced to the knockout stage.

Group	Winners	Runners-up
A	Burkina Faso	Cameroon
B	Senegal	Tunisia
C	DR Congo	Morocco
D	Egypt	Ghana

== Bracket ==
Quarter-finals
28 January – Libreville
Burkina Faso	2
Tunisia	0
29 January – Port-Gentil
Egypt	1
Morocco	0
28 January – Franceville
Senegal	0 (4)
Cameroon (p)	0 (5)
29 January – Oyem
DR Congo	1
Ghana	2

Semi-finals
1 February – Libreville
Burkina Faso	1 (3)
Egypt (p)	1 (4)
2 February – Franceville
Cameroon	2
Ghana	0

Final
5 February – Libreville
Egypt	1
Cameroon	2
Third place play-off
4 February – Port-Gentil
Burkina Faso	1
Ghana	0

== Quarter-finals ==
=== Burkina Faso vs Tunisia ===
28 January 2017
17:00

Burkina Faso	2–0	Tunisia
Bancé 81'; Nakoulma 85'	Report

Stade de l'Amitié, Libreville
Referee: Daniel Bennett (South Africa)

Burkina Faso	Tunisia

GK	16	Hervé Koffi
RB	2	Steeve Yago
CB	14	Issoufou Dayo
CB	4	Bakary Koné
LB	20	Yacouba Coulibaly	(yellow card) 67'
CM	18	Charles Kaboré (c)	(yellow card) 19'
CM	22	Blati Touré	(yellow card) 83'	(substituted off) 87'
AM	8	Abdou Razack Traoré
RF	19	Bertrand Traoré		(substituted off) 90+2'
CF	7	Préjuce Nakoulma	(yellow card) 86'
LF	21	Cyrille Bayala		(substituted off) 77'
Substitutions:
FW	15	Aristide Bancé		(substituted on) 77'
MF	6	Bakary Saré		(substituted on) 87'
MF	10	Alain Traoré		(substituted on) 90+2'
Manager:
(Portugal) Paulo Duarte

GK	16	Aymen Mathlouthi (c)
RB	21	Hamdi Nagguez
CB	2	Syam Ben Youssef	(yellow card) 38'
CB	20	Mohamed Ali Yacoubi	(yellow card) 34'
LB	3	Aymen Abdennour	(yellow card) 22'
CM	14	Mohamed Amine Ben Amor
CM	13	Ferjani Sassi		(substituted off) 85'
RW	10	Wahbi Khazri		(substituted off) 63'
AM	23	Naïm Sliti
LW	7	Youssef Msakni
CF	11	Taha Yassine Khenissi		(substituted off) 85'
Substitutions:
MF	8	Hamza Lahmar		(substituted on) 63'
FW	9	Ahmed Akaïchi		(substituted on) 85'
FW	19	Saber Khalifa		(substituted on) 85'
Manager:
(Poland) Henryk Kasperczak

Man of the Match:
Préjuce Nakoulma (Burkina Faso)

Assistant referees:
Zakhele Siwela (South Africa)
Aboubacar Doumbouya (Guinea)
Fourth official:
Joshua Bondo (Botswana)
Fifth official:
Yahaya Mahamadou (Niger)

=== Senegal vs Cameroon ===
28 January 2017
20:00

Senegal	0–0 (a.e.t.)	Cameroon
	Report
Penalties
Koulibaly (penalty scored); Mbodji (penalty scored); Sow (penalty scored); Saivet (penalty scored); Mané (penalty missed)	4–5	(penalty scored) Moukandjo; (penalty scored) Oyongo; (penalty scored) Teikeu; (penalty scored) Zoua; (penalty scored) Aboubakar

Stade de Franceville, Franceville
Referee: Janny Sikazwe (Zambia)

Senegal	Cameroon

GK	1	Abdoulaye Diallo
RB	21	Lamine Gassama
CB	3	Kalidou Koulibaly
CB	2	Kara Mbodji
LB	4	Cheikh M'Bengue		(substituted off) 86'
CM	5	Idrissa Gueye
CM	8	Cheikhou Kouyaté (c)	(yellow card) 90+3'	(substituted off) 109'
RW	20	Keita Baldé
AM	22	Henri Saivet
LW	10	Sadio Mané
CF	9	Mame Biram Diouf	(yellow card) 13'	(substituted off) 64'
Substitutions:
FW	7	Moussa Sow		(substituted on) 64'
DF	19	Saliou Ciss		(substituted on) 86'
MF	17	Badou Ndiaye		(substituted on) 109'
Manager:
Aliou Cissé

GK	1	Fabrice Ondoa
RB	19	Collins Fai	(yellow card) 59'
CB	4	Adolphe Teikeu
CB	5	Michael Ngadeu-Ngadjui
LB	6	Ambroise Oyongo	(yellow card) 25'
CM	15	Sébastien Siani
CM	17	Arnaud Djoum	(yellow card) 82'	(substituted off) 102'
RW	13	Christian Bassogog
AM	8	Benjamin Moukandjo (c)
LW	20	Karl Toko Ekambi		(substituted off) 46'
CF	18	Robert Ndip Tambe		(substituted off) 102'
Substitutions:
FW	9	Jacques Zoua		(substituted on) 46'
FW	10	Vincent Aboubakar		(substituted on) 102'
MF	14	Georges Mandjeck		(substituted on) 102'
Manager:
(Belgium) Hugo Broos

Man of the Match:
Fabrice Ondoa (Cameroon)

Assistant referees:
Jerson Emiliano Dos Santos (Angola)
Marwa Range (Kenya)
Fourth official:
Hamada Nampiandraza (Madagascar)
Fifth official:
Arsénio Chadreque Marengula (Mozambique)

=== DR Congo vs Ghana ===
29 January 2017
17:00

DR Congo	1–2	Ghana
M'Poku 68'	Report	J. Ayew 63'; A. Ayew 78' (pen.)

Stade d'Oyem, Oyem
Referee: Bernard Camille (Seychelles)

DR Congo	Ghana

GK	1	Ley Matampi
RB	2	Issama Mpeko
CB	18	Merveille Bokadi
CB	5	Marcel Tisserand	(yellow card) 61'
LB	13	Joyce Lomalisa	(yellow card) 59'
CM	15	Rémi Mulumba	(yellow card) 16'	(substituted off) 85'
CM	22	Chancel Mbemba
AM	8	Paul-José M'Poku		(substituted off) 83'
RF	21	Firmin Ndombe Mubele		(substituted off) 83'
CF	9	Dieumerci Mbokani (c)
LF	6	Junior Kabananga
Substitutions:
FW	17	Cédric Bakambu		(substituted on) 83'
FW	19	Jeremy Bokila		(substituted on) 83'
FW	12	Jonathan Bolingi		(substituted on) 85'
Manager:
Florent Ibengé

GK	1	Brimah Razak
RB	23	Harrison Afful
CB	18	Daniel Amartey	(yellow card) 74'
CB	21	John Boye
LB	22	Frank Acheampong
CM	5	Thomas Partey
CM	6	Afriyie Acquah
CM	11	Mubarak Wakaso	(yellow card) 58'
RF	7	Christian Atsu
CF	9	Jordan Ayew
LF	10	André Ayew (c)
Manager:
(Israel) Avram Grant

Man of the Match:
Jordan Ayew (Ghana)

Assistant referees:
Albdelhak Etchiali (Algeria)
Mohammed Abdallah Ibrahim (Sudan)
Fourth official:
Mehdi Abid Charef (Algeria)
Fifth official:
Ali Waleed Ahmed (Sudan)

=== Egypt vs Morocco ===
29 January 2017
20:00

Egypt	1–0	Morocco
Kahraba 88'	Report

Stade de Port-Gentil, Port-Gentil
Referee: Eric Otogo-Castane (Gabon)

Egypt	Morocco

GK	1	Essam El-Hadary (c)
RB	3	Ahmed Elmohamady
CB	2	Ali Gabr
CB	6	Ahmed Hegazy
LB	15	Karim Hafez		(substituted off) 63'
CM	8	Tarek Hamed	(yellow card) 11'	(substituted off) 90+3'
CM	7	Ahmed Fathy
RW	10	Mohamed Salah
AM	19	Abdallah Said
LW	21	Trézéguet
CF	18	Marwan Mohsen		(substituted off) 43'
Substitutions:
FW	9	Ahmed Hassan		(substituted on) 43'
MF	11	Kahraba	(yellow card) 74'	(substituted on) 63'
DF	20	Saad Samir		(substituted on) 90+3'
Manager:
(Argentina) Héctor Cúper

GK	12	Munir Mohand
RB	2	Hamza Mendyl
CB	4	Manuel da Costa
CB	5	Medhi Benatia (c)
LB	17	Nabil Dirar
DM	6	Romain Saïss	(substituted off) 90+2'
CM	14	Mbark Boussoufa
CM	8	Karim El Ahmadi
RW	11	Fayçal Fajr
LW	7	Youssef En-Nesyri
CF	20	Aziz Bouhaddouz	(substituted off) 78'
Substitutions:
MF	16	Omar El Kaddouri	(substituted on) 78'
FW	23	Rachid Alioui	(substituted on) 90+2'
Manager:
(France) Hervé Renard

Man of the Match:
Kahraba (Egypt)

Assistant referees:
Jean-Claude Birumushahu (Burundi)
Théophile Vinga (Gabon)
Fourth official:
Bamlak Tessema Weyesa (Ethiopia)
Fifth official:
Marius Donatien Tan (Ivory Coast)

== Semi-finals ==
=== Burkina Faso vs Egypt ===
1 February 2017
20:00

Burkina Faso	1–1 (a.e.t.)	Egypt
Bancé 73'	Report	M. Salah 66'
Penalties
Al. Traoré (penalty scored); Diawara (penalty scored); Yago (penalty scored); Koffi (penalty missed); B. Traoré (penalty missed)	3–4	(penalty missed) Said; (penalty scored) Sobhi; (penalty scored) Hegazy; (penalty scored) M. Salah; (penalty scored) Warda

Stade de l'Amitié, Libreville
Referee: Malang Diedhiou (Senegal)

Burkina Faso	Egypt

GK	16	Hervé Koffi
RB	2	Steeve Yago	(yellow card) 98'
CB	14	Issoufou Dayo
CB	4	Bakary Koné
LB	20	Yacouba Coulibaly
CM	8	Abdou Razack Traoré		(substituted off) 80'
CM	18	Charles Kaboré (c)
AM	22	Blati Touré
RW	19	Bertrand Traoré	(yellow card) 86'
LW	7	Préjuce Nakoulma
CF	15	Aristide Bancé		(substituted off) 102'
Substitutions:
FW	9	Banou Diawara		(substituted on) 80'
MF	10	Alain Traoré		(substituted on) 102'
Manager:
(Portugal) Paulo Duarte

GK	1	Essam El-Hadary (c)
RB	3	Ahmed Elmohamady		(substituted off) 106'
CB	6	Ahmed Hegazy
CB	2	Ali Gabr
LB	7	Ahmed Fathy	(yellow card) 41'
CM	8	Tarek Hamed
CM	5	Ibrahim Salah
AM	19	Abdallah Said
RW	10	Mohamed Salah
LW	21	Trézéguet		(substituted off) 85'
CF	11	Kahraba	(yellow card) 54'	(substituted off) 74'
Substitutions:
MF	22	Amr Warda		(substituted on) 74'
MF	14	Ramadan Sobhi		(substituted on) 85'
DF	4	Omar Gaber		(substituted on) 106'
Manager:
(Argentina) Héctor Cúper

Man of the Match:
Essam El-Hadary (Egypt)

Assistant referees:
Djibril Camara (Senegal)
El Hadji Malick Samba (Senegal)
Fourth official:
Hamada Nampiandraza (Madagascar)
Fifth official:
Arsénio Chadreque Marengula (Mozambique)

=== Cameroon vs Ghana ===
2 February 2017
20:00

Cameroon	2–0	Ghana
Ngadeu-Ngadjui 72'; Bassogog 90+3'	Report

Stade de Franceville, Franceville
Referee: Bakary Gassama (Gambia)

Cameroon	Ghana

GK	1	Fabrice Ondoa
RB	19	Collins Fai
CB	5	Michael Ngadeu-Ngadjui
CB	4	Adolphe Teikeu
LB	6	Ambroise Oyongo
CM	17	Arnaud Djoum		(substituted off) 77'
CM	15	Sébastien Siani
AM	9	Jacques Zoua
RW	13	Christian Bassogog
LW	8	Benjamin Moukandjo (c)	(yellow card) 82'
CF	18	Robert Ndip Tambe		(substituted off) 74'
Substitutions:
FW	10	Vincent Aboubakar		(substituted on) 74'
MF	14	Georges Mandjeck		(substituted on) 77'
Manager:
(Belgium) Hugo Broos

GK	1	Brimah Razak
RB	23	Harrison Afful
CB	21	John Boye
CB	18	Daniel Amartey
LB	22	Frank Acheampong
CM	5	Thomas Partey	(substituted off) 86'
CM	6	Afriyie Acquah	(substituted off) 76'
CM	11	Mubarak Wakaso
RF	7	Christian Atsu
CF	9	Jordan Ayew
LF	10	André Ayew (c)
Substitutions:
FW	3	Asamoah Gyan	(substituted on) 76'
MF	8	Emmanuel Agyemang-Badu	(substituted on) 86'
Manager:
(Israel) Avram Grant

Man of the Match:
Christian Bassogog (Cameroon)

Assistant referees:
Jean-Claude Birumushahu (Burundi)
Ali Waleed Ahmed (Sudan)
Fourth official:
Joshua Bondo (Botswana)
Fifth official:
Redouane Achik (Morocco)

== Third place play-off ==
4 February 2017
20:00

Burkina Faso	1–0	Ghana
Al. Traoré 89'	Report

Stade de Port-Gentil, Port-Gentil
Attendance: 20,720
Referee: Mehdi Abid Charef (Algeria)

Burkina Faso	Ghana

GK	16	Hervé Koffi
RB	2	Steeve Yago
CB	14	Issoufou Dayo
CB	4	Bakary Koné
LB	20	Yacouba Coulibaly	(substituted off) 83'
CM	22	Blati Touré
CM	18	Charles Kaboré (c)	(substituted off) 88'
AM	10	Alain Traoré
RF	19	Bertrand Traoré
CF	15	Aristide Bancé	(substituted off) 73'
LF	7	Préjuce Nakoulma
Substitutions:
FW	21	Cyrille Bayala	(substituted on) 73'
DF	5	Patrick Malo	(substituted on) 83'
MF	12	Adama Guira	(substituted on) 88'
Manager:
(Portugal) Paulo Duarte

GK	12	Richard Ofori
RB	23	Harrison Afful
CB	18	Daniel Amartey
CB	4	Jonathan Mensah
LB	2	Andy Yiadom
DM	5	Thomas Partey
CM	8	Emmanuel Badu (c)
CM	15	Ebenezer Ofori
RF	14	Bernard Tekpetey	(substituted off) 71'
CF	9	Jordan Ayew	(substituted off) 75'
LF	20	Samuel Tetteh	(substituted off) 65'
Substitutions:
FW	3	Asamoah Gyan	(substituted on) 65'
MF	10	André Ayew	(substituted on) 71'
MF	7	Christian Atsu	(substituted on) 75'
Manager:
(Israel) Avram Grant

Man of the Match:
Bertrand Traoré (Burkina Faso)

Assistant referees:
Albdelhak Etchiali (Algeria)
Anouar Hmila (Tunisia)
Fourth official:
Youssef Essrayri (Tunisia)
Fifth official:
Mohammed Abdallah Ibrahim (Sudan)

== Final ==
5 February 2017
20:00

Egypt	1–2	Cameroon
Elneny 22'	Report	Nkoulou 59'; Aboubakar 88'

Stade de l'Amitié, Libreville
Attendance: 38,250
Referee: Janny Sikazwe (Zambia)

Egypt	Cameroon

GK	1	Essam El-Hadary (c)
RB	3	Ahmed Elmohamady
CB	6	Ahmed Hegazy
CB	2	Ali Gabr
LB	7	Ahmed Fathy
CM	8	Tarek Hamed
CM	17	Mohamed Elneny
RW	10	Mohamed Salah
AM	19	Abdallah Said
LW	21	Trézéguet		(substituted off) 65'
CF	22	Amr Warda
Substitutions:
MF	14	Ramadan Sobhi	(yellow card) 90+2'	(substituted on) 65'
Manager:
(Argentina) Héctor Cúper

GK	1	Fabrice Ondoa
RB	19	Collins Fai	(yellow card) 90+1'
CB	5	Michael Ngadeu-Ngadjui
CB	4	Adolphe Teikeu		(substituted off) 31'
LB	6	Ambroise Oyongo
CM	15	Sébastien Siani
CM	17	Arnaud Djoum
RW	13	Christian Bassogog	(yellow card) 90+4'
AM	9	Jacques Zoua		(substituted off) 90+4'
LW	8	Benjamin Moukandjo (c)
CF	18	Robert Ndip Tambe		(substituted off) 46'
Substitutions:
DF	3	Nicolas Nkoulou		(substituted on) 31'
FW	10	Vincent Aboubakar	(yellow card) 89'	(substituted on) 46'
MF	14	Georges Mandjeck		(substituted on) 90+4'
Manager:
(Belgium) Hugo Broos

Man of the Match:
Benjamin Moukandjo (Cameroon)
