= 2017 Africa Cup of Nations Group D =

Football tournament group stage

Group D of the 2017 Africa Cup of Nations was played from 17 to 25 January 2017 in Gabon. The group consisted of Ghana, Mali, Egypt, and Uganda.

Egypt and Ghana advanced to the round of 16 as the top two teams.

== Teams ==
Draw position	Team	Method of qualification	Date of qualification	Finals appearance	Last appearance	Previous best performance	CAF Rankings Points (Note: The CAF rankings were used for seeding for the final draw.)	FIFA Rankings Start of event
D1	Ghana	Group H winners	5 June 2016	21st	2015	Winners (1963, 1965, 1978, 1982)	56.5	54
D2	Mali	Group C winners	5 June 2016	10th	2015	Runners-up (1972)	33.5	64
D3	Egypt	Group G winners	4 June 2016	23rd	2010	Winners (1957, 1959, 1986, 1998, 2006, 2008, 2010)	15.5	35
D4	Uganda	Group D runners-up	4 September 2016	6th	1978	Runners-up (1978)	12	73

== Standings ==
Pos	Team	Pld	W	D	L	GF	GA	GD	Pts	Qualification
1	Egypt	3	2	1	0	2	0	+2	7	Advance to knockout stage
2	Ghana	3	2	0	1	2	1	+1	6	Advance to knockout stage
3	Mali	3	0	2	1	1	2	−1	2	
4	Uganda	3	0	1	2	1	3	−2	1	

Source: CAF
Rules for classification: Group stage tiebreakers

In the quarter-finals:

- The group winners, Egypt, advanced to play the runners-up of Group C, Morocco.
- The group runners-up, Ghana, advanced to play the winners of Group C, DR Congo.

== Matches ==
All times are local, WAT (UTC+1).

=== Ghana vs Uganda ===
17 January 2017
17:00

Ghana	1–0	Uganda
A. Ayew 32' (pen.)	Report

Stade de Port-Gentil, Port-Gentil
Referee: Joshua Bondo (Botswana)

Ghana	Uganda

GK	1	Brimah Razak
RB	23	Harrison Afful
CB	18	Daniel Amartey
CB	21	John Boye
LB	17	Baba Rahman	(substituted off) 39'
RM	10	André Ayew
CM	5	Thomas Partey
CM	11	Mubarak Wakaso
LM	7	Christian Atsu
CF	3	Asamoah Gyan (c)	(substituted off) 73'
CF	9	Jordan Ayew	(substituted off) 86'
Substitutions:
DF	22	Frank Acheampong	(substituted in) 39'
MF	8	Emmanuel Agyemang-Badu	(substituted in) 73'
MF	6	Afriyie Acquah	(substituted in) 86'
Manager:
(Israel) Avram Grant

GK	18	Denis Onyango (c)
RB	12	Denis Iguma
CB	16	Hassan Wasswa
CB	5	Isaac Isinde	(yellow card) 31'	(substituted off) 70'
LB	2	Joseph Ochaya
DM	3	Geoffrey Kizito
RW	10	Luwagga Kizito		(substituted off) 57'
AM	23	Micheal Azira		(substituted off) 46'
LW	6	Tony Mawejje
CF	17	Farouk Miya
CF	11	Geofrey Massa
Substitutions:
MF	13	Moses Oloya		(substituted in) 46'
FW	21	Muhammad Shaban		(substituted in) 57'
FW	9	Geoffrey Sserunkuma		(substituted in) 70'
Manager:
(Serbia) Milutin Sredojević

Man of the Match:
Christian Atsu (Ghana)

Assistant referees:
Abdelhak Etchiali (Algeria)
Olivier Safari (DR Congo)
Fourth official:
Mehdi Abid Charef (Algeria)

=== Mali vs Egypt ===
17 January 2017
20:00

Mali	0–0	Egypt
	Report

Stade de Port-Gentil, Port-Gentil
Referee: Daniel Bennett (South Africa)

Mali	Egypt

GK	1	Oumar Sissoko
RB	23	Ousmane Coulibaly
CB	13	Molla Wagué
CB	4	Salif Coulibaly
LB	2	Hamary Traoré
CM	17	Mamoutou N'Diaye
CM	8	Yacouba Sylla (c)
AM	6	Lassana Coulibaly		(substituted off) 72'
RW	14	Sambou Yatabaré		(substituted off) 65'
LW	11	Bakary Sako
CF	9	Moussa Marega
Substitutions:
MF	20	Yves Bissouma		(substituted in) 65'
MF	18	Samba Sow	(yellow card) 88'	(substituted in) 72'
Manager:
(France) Alain Giresse

GK	23	Ahmed El Shenawy		(substituted off) 25'
RB	7	Ahmed Fathy (c)	(yellow card) 90+1'
CB	6	Ahmed Hegazy
CB	2	Ali Gabr
LB	13	Mohamed Abdel Shafy
CM	8	Tarek Hamed
CM	17	Mohamed Elneny
RW	10	Mohamed Salah	(yellow card) 67'	(substituted off) 70'
AM	19	Abdallah Said
LW	21	Trézéguet
CF	18	Marwan Mohsen		(substituted off) 76'
Substitutions:
GK	1	Essam El-Hadary		(substituted in) 25'
MF	14	Ramadan Sobhi		(substituted in) 70'
FW	9	Ahmed Hassan		(substituted in) 76'
Manager:
(Argentina) Héctor Cúper

Man of the Match:
Moussa Marega (Mali)

Assistant referees:
Zakhele Siwela (South Africa)
Marius Tan (Ivory Coast)
Fourth official:
Bernard Camille (Seychelles)

=== Ghana vs Mali ===
21 January 2017
17:00

Ghana	1–0	Mali
Gyan 21'	Report

Stade de Port-Gentil, Port-Gentil
Referee: Mehdi Abid Charef (Algeria)

Ghana	Mali

GK	1	Brimah Razak
RB	23	Harrison Afful
CB	18	Daniel Amartey
CB	21	John Boye
LB	22	Frank Acheampong
RM	7	Christian Atsu
CM	5	Thomas Partey
CM	11	Mubarak Wakaso
LM	10	André Ayew
CF	9	Jordan Ayew		(substituted off) 90'
CF	3	Asamoah Gyan (c)	(yellow card) 82'	(substituted off) 82'
Substitutions:
MF	8	Emmanuel Agyemang-Badu		(substituted in) 82'
MF	6	Afriyie Acquah		(substituted in) 90'
Manager:
(Israel) Avram Grant

GK	1	Oumar Sissoko
RB	23	Ousmane Coulibaly
CB	13	Molla Wagué
CB	4	Salif Coulibaly
LB	2	Hamary Traoré
CM	17	Mamoutou N'Diaye
CM	8	Yacouba Sylla (c)
RW	14	Sambou Yatabaré	(substituted off) 46'
AM	7	Mustapha Yatabaré	(substituted off) 63'
LW	11	Bakary Sako
CF	9	Moussa Marega	(substituted off) 79'
Substitutions:
MF	20	Yves Bissouma	(substituted in) 46'
MF	12	Moussa Doumbia	(substituted in) 63'
FW	10	Kalifa Coulibaly	(substituted in) 79'
Manager:
(France) Alain Giresse

Man of the Match:
Thomas Partey (Ghana)

Assistant referees:
Albdelhak Etchiali (Algeria)
Arsénio Chadreque Marengula (Mozambique)
Fourth official:
Hamada Nampiandraza (Madagascar)

=== Egypt vs Uganda ===
21 January 2017
20:00

Egypt	1–0	Uganda
Said 89'	Report

Stade de Port-Gentil, Port-Gentil
Referee: Malang Diedhiou (Senegal)

Egypt	Uganda

GK	1	Essam El-Hadary (c)
RB	7	Ahmed Fathy
CB	2	Ali Gabr
CB	6	Ahmed Hegazy
LB	13	Mohamed Abdel Shafy
CM	17	Mohamed Elneny
CM	8	Tarek Hamed	(yellow card) 25'	(substituted off) 59'
RW	21	Trézéguet		(substituted off) 79'
AM	10	Mohamed Salah
LW	14	Ramadan Sobhi		(substituted off) 66'
CF	18	Marwan Mohsen
Substitutions:
MF	19	Abdallah Said		(substituted in) 59'
MF	22	Amr Warda		(substituted in) 66'
MF	11	Kahraba		(substituted in) 79'
Manager:
(Argentina) Héctor Cúper

GK	18	Denis Onyango
RB	12	Denis Iguma	(substituted off) 90+1'
CB	4	Murushid Juuko
CB	16	Hassan Wasswa
LB	15	Godfrey Walusimbi
CM	3	Geoffrey Kizito
CM	8	Khalid Aucho
RW	2	Joseph Ochaya
AM	17	Farouk Miya	(substituted off) 81'
LW	6	Tony Mawejje
CF	11	Geofrey Massa (c)	(substituted off) 65'
Substitutions:
FW	21	Muhammad Shaban	(substituted in) 65'
DF	14	Nicholas Wadada	(substituted in) 81'
MF	13	Moses Oloya	(substituted in) 90+1'
Manager:
(Serbia) Milutin Sredojević

Man of the Match:
Abdallah Said (Egypt)

Assistant referees:
Djibril Camara (Senegal)
El Hadji Malick Samba (Senegal)
Fourth official:
Eric Otogo-Castane (Gabon)

=== Egypt vs Ghana ===
25 January 2017
20:00

Egypt	1–0	Ghana
M. Salah 11'	Report

Stade de Port-Gentil, Port-Gentil
Referee: Bakary Gassama (Gambia)

Egypt	Ghana

GK	1	Essam El-Hadary (c)
RB	3	Ahmed Elmohamady
CB	6	Ahmed Hegazy
CB	2	Ali Gabr
LB	7	Ahmed Fathy
CM	8	Tarek Hamed
CM	17	Mohamed Elneny
RW	10	Mohamed Salah
AM	19	Abdallah Said		(substituted off) 76'
LW	21	Trézéguet	(yellow card) 74'
CF	18	Marwan Mohsen	(yellow card) 56'	(substituted off) 69'
Substitutions:
MF	11	Kahraba		(substituted in) 69'
MF	22	Amr Warda		(substituted in) 76'
Manager:
(Argentina) Héctor Cúper

GK	1	Brimah Razak
RB	23	Harrison Afful
CB	18	Daniel Amartey
CB	21	John Boye	(yellow card) 80'
LB	4	Jonathan Mensah
CM	8	Emmanuel Agyemang-Badu		(substituted off) 80'
CM	20	Samuel Tetteh		(substituted off) 73'
CM	2	Andy Yiadom
RF	7	Christian Atsu
CF	3	Asamoah Gyan (c)		(substituted off) 41'
LF	10	André Ayew
Substitutions:
FW	9	Jordan Ayew		(substituted in) 41'
MF	14	Bernard Tekpetey	(yellow card) 77'	(substituted in) 73'
MF	11	Mubarak Wakaso		(substituted in) 80'
Manager:
(Israel) Avram Grant

Man of the Match:
Ahmed Hegazy (Egypt)

Assistant referees:
Jean-Claude Birumushahu (Burundi)
Marwa Range (Kenya)
Fourth official:
Youssef Essrayri (Tunisia)

=== Uganda vs Mali ===
25 January 2017
20:00

Uganda	1–1	Mali
Miya 70'	Report	Bissouma 73'

Stade d'Oyem, Oyem
Referee: Ali Lemghaifry (Mauritania)

Uganda	Mali

GK	1	Robert Odongkara	(yellow card) 78'
RB	12	Denis Iguma
CB	4	Murushid Juuko	(yellow card) 43'
CB	16	Hassan Wasswa (c)
LB	15	Godfrey Walusimbi
RM	13	Moses Oloya		(substituted off) 60'
CM	3	Geoffrey Kizito
CM	8	Khalid Aucho		(substituted off) 90+2'
LM	2	Joseph Ochaya
CF	17	Farouk Miya
CF	10	Luwagga Kizito		(substituted off) 78'
Substitutions:
MF	6	Tony Mawejje		(substituted in) 60'
FW	11	Geofrey Massa		(substituted in) 78'
MF	23	Micheal Azira		(substituted in) 90+2'
Manager:
(Serbia) Milutin Sredojević

GK	1	Oumar Sissoko
RB	23	Ousmane Coulibaly
CB	13	Molla Wagué
CB	21	Mahamadou N'Diaye
LB	2	Hamary Traoré
CM	17	Mamoutou N'Diaye
CM	8	Yacouba Sylla (c)
RW	20	Yves Bissouma
AM	6	Lassana Coulibaly	(substituted off) 54'
LW	12	Moussa Doumbia
CF	9	Moussa Marega	(substituted off) 78'
Substitutions:
FW	10	Kalifa Coulibaly	(substituted in) 54'
FW	7	Mustapha Yatabaré	(substituted in) 78'
Manager:
(France) Alain Giresse

Man of the Match:
Farouk Miya (Uganda)

Assistant referees:
Evarist Menkouande (Cameroon)
Anouar Hmila (Tunisia)
Fourth official:
Eric Otogo-Castane (Gabon)
