= 2017 Africa Cup of Nations Group C =

Football tournament group stage

Group C of the 2017 Africa Cup of Nations was played from 16 to 24 January 2017 in Gabon. The group consisted of defending champions Ivory Coast, Morocco, DR Congo, and Togo.

DR Congo and Morocco advanced to the quarterfinals as the top two teams.

== Teams ==
Draw position	Team	Method of qualification	Date of qualification	Finals appearance	Last appearance	Previous best performance	CAF Rankings Points (Note: The CAF rankings were used for seeding for the final draw.)	FIFA Rankings Start of event
C1	Ivory Coast	Group I winners	3 September 2016	22nd	2015	Winners (1992, 2015)	63.5	34
C2	DR Congo	Group B winners	4 September 2016	18th	2015	Winners (1968, 1974)	29.5	49
C3	Morocco	Group F winners	29 March 2016	16th	2013	Winners (1976)	18.5	57
C4	Togo	Group A runners-up	4 September 2016	8th	2013	Quarter-finals (2013)	15.5	90

== Standings ==
Pos	Team	Pld	W	D	L	GF	GA	GD	Pts	Qualification
1	DR Congo	3	2	1	0	6	3	+3	7	Advance to knockout stage
2	Morocco	3	2	0	1	4	2	+2	6	Advance to knockout stage
3	Ivory Coast	3	0	2	1	2	3	−1	2	
4	Togo	3	0	1	2	2	6	−4	1	

Source: CAF
Rules for classification: Group stage tiebreakers

In the quarter-finals:

- The group winners, DR Congo, advanced to play the runners-up of Group D, Ghana.
- The group runners-up, Morocco, advanced to play the winners of Group D, Egypt.

== Matches ==
All times are local, WAT (UTC+1).

=== Ivory Coast vs Togo ===
16 January 2017
17:00

Ivory Coast	0–0	Togo
	Report

Stade d'Oyem, Oyem
Referee: Eric Otogo-Castane (Gabon)

Ivory Coast	Togo

GK	16	Sylvain Gbohouo
RB	17	Serge Aurier
CB	21	Eric Bailly
CB	5	Wilfried Kanon
LB	18	Adama Traoré
CM	11	Franck Kessié
CM	20	Serey Dié (c)
CM	6	Jean Seri	(substituted off) 66'
RW	9	Wilfried Zaha	(substituted off) 70'
CF	14	Jonathan Kodjia	(substituted off) 83'
LW	8	Salomon Kalou
Substitutions:
MF	10	Cheick Doukouré	(substituted in) 66'
FW	12	Wilfried Bony	(substituted in) 70'
MF	15	Max Gradel	(substituted in) 83'
Manager:
(France) Michel Dussuyer

GK	16	Kossi Agassa
RB	17	Serge Gakpé
CB	15	Alaixys Romao
CB	13	Sadat Ouro-Akoriko
LB	21	Djené Dakonam
RM	7	Mathieu Dossevi	(substituted off) 88'
CM	10	Floyd Ayité
CM	18	Lalawélé Atakora
LM	22	Ihlas Bebou
CF	4	Emmanuel Adebayor (c)	(substituted off) 89'
CF	19	Kodjo Fo-Doh Laba	(substituted off) 83'
Substitutions:
DF	5	Serge Akakpo	(substituted in) 83'
FW	8	Komlan Agbégniadan	(substituted in) 88'
MF	12	Razak Boukari	(substituted in) 89'
Manager:
(France) Claude Le Roy

Man of the Match:
Lalawélé Atakora (Togo)

Assistant referees:
Théophile Vinga (Gabon)
Tahssen Abo El Sadat Bedyer (Egypt)
Fourth official:
Youssef Essrayri (Tunisia)

=== DR Congo vs Morocco ===
16 January 2017
20:00

DR Congo	1–0	Morocco
Kabananga 55'	Report

Stade d'Oyem, Oyem
Referee: Hamada Nampiandraza (Madagascar)

DR Congo	Morocco

GK	1	Ley Matampi
RB	2	Issama Mpeko
CB	5	Marcel Tisserand
CB	14	Gabriel Zakuani (c)
LB	3	Fabrice N'Sakala	(yellow card) 48'	(substituted off) 65'
CM	22	Chancel Mbemba
CM	18	Merveille Bokadi
CM	15	Rémi Mulumba
RW	6	Junior Kabananga		(substituted off) 72'
CF	17	Cédric Bakambu		(substituted off) 77'
LW	21	Firmin Ndombe Mubele
Substitutions:
DF	13	Joyce Lomalisa	(yellow card) 74' (yellow-red card) 81'	(substituted in) 65'
MF	20	Jacques Maghoma		(substituted in) 72'
FW	9	Dieumerci Mbokani		(substituted in) 77'
Manager:
Florent Ibengé

GK	12	Munir Mohand
RB	17	Nabil Dirar
CB	5	Medhi Benatia (c)
CB	4	Manuel da Costa	(yellow card) 68'
LB	2	Hamza Mendyl
DM	8	Karim El Ahmadi
CM	21	Mehdi Carcela		(substituted off) 79'
CM	16	Omar El Kaddouri		(substituted off) 61'
RW	14	Mbark Boussoufa
CF	20	Aziz Bouhaddouz
LW	6	Romain Saïss		(substituted off) 73'
Substitutions:
FW	7	Youssef En-Nesyri		(substituted in) 61'
MF	11	Fayçal Fajr		(substituted in) 73'
FW	9	Youssef El-Arabi		(substituted in) 79'
Manager:
(France) Hervé Renard

Man of the Match:
Mbark Boussoufa (Morocco)

Assistant referees:
Arsenio Marengula (Mozambique)
Yahaya Mahamadou (Niger)
Fourth official:
Bakary Gassama (Gambia)

=== Ivory Coast vs DR Congo ===
20 January 2017
17:00

Ivory Coast	2–2	DR Congo
Bony 25'; Dié 67'	Report	Kebano 10'; Kabananga 28'

Stade d'Oyem, Oyem
Referee: Janny Sikazwe (Zambia)

Ivory Coast	DR Congo

GK	16	Sylvain Gbohouo
RB	17	Serge Aurier
CB	21	Eric Bailly
CB	5	Wilfried Kanon
LB	18	Adama Traoré		(substituted off) 46'
CM	10	Cheick Doukouré
CM	20	Serey Dié (c)
CM	11	Franck Kessié	(yellow card) 65'
RW	9	Wilfried Zaha
CF	12	Wilfried Bony
LW	15	Max Gradel		(substituted off) 77'
Substitutions:
DF	19	Simon Deli		(substituted in) 46'
FW	8	Salomon Kalou		(substituted in) 77'
Manager:
(France) Michel Dussuyer

GK	1	Ley Matampi
RB	18	Merveille Bokadi
CB	2	Issama Mpeko
CB	4	Jordan Ikoko	(substituted off) 72'
LB	5	Marcel Tisserand
CM	20	Jacques Maghoma	(substituted off) 72'
CM	10	Neeskens Kebano
CM	22	Chancel Mbemba
RW	21	Firmin Ndombe Mubele
CF	9	Dieumerci Mbokani (c)
LW	6	Junior Kabananga	(substituted off) 79'
Substitutions:
MF	7	Youssouf Mulumbu	(substituted in) 72'
MF	15	Rémi Mulumba	(substituted in) 72'
FW	12	Jonathan Bolingi	(substituted in) 79'
Manager:
Florent Ibengé

Man of the Match:
Serey Dié (Ivory Coast)

Assistant referees:
Jerson Emiliano Dos Santos (Angola)
Marwa Range (Kenya)
Fourth official:
Daniel Bennett (South Africa)

=== Morocco vs Togo ===
20 January 2017
20:00

Morocco	3–1	Togo
Bouhaddouz 14'; Saïss 21'; En-Nesyri 72'	Report	Dossevi 5'

Stade d'Oyem, Oyem
Referee: Mahamadou Keita (Mali)

Morocco	Togo

GK	12	Munir Mohand
CB	5	Medhi Benatia (c)
CB	4	Manuel da Costa
CB	6	Romain Saïss
RWB	17	Nabil Dirar
LWB	2	Hamza Mendyl
CM	8	Karim El Ahmadi
CM	14	Mbark Boussoufa	(yellow card) 56'
CM	16	Omar El Kaddouri		(substituted off) 61'
CF	11	Fayçal Fajr		(substituted off) 81'
CF	20	Aziz Bouhaddouz		(substituted off) 90'
Substitutions:
FW	7	Youssef En-Nesyri		(substituted in) 61'
MF	15	Youssef Aït Bennasser		(substituted in) 81'
FW	23	Rachid Alioui		(substituted in) 90'
Manager:
(France) Hervé Renard

GK	16	Kossi Agassa
RB	17	Serge Gakpé
CB	15	Alaixys Romao
CB	13	Sadat Ouro-Akoriko
LB	21	Djené Dakonam
RM	7	Mathieu Dossevi		(substituted off) 84'
CM	18	Lalawélé Atakora		(substituted off) 89'
CM	10	Floyd Ayité	(yellow card) 83'
LM	22	Ihlas Bebou
CF	19	Kodjo Fo-Doh Laba		(substituted off) 73'
CF	4	Emmanuel Adebayor (c)
Substitutions:
MF	12	Razak Boukari		(substituted in) 73'
MF	14	Prince Segbefia		(substituted in) 84'
FW	8	Komlan Agbégniadan		(substituted in) 89'
Manager:
(France) Claude Le Roy

Man of the Match:
Fayçal Fajr (Morocco)

Assistant referees:
Evarist Menkouande (Cameroon)
Aboubacar Doumbouya (Guinea)
Fourth official:
Sidi Alioum (Cameroon)

=== Morocco vs Ivory Coast ===
24 January 2017
20:00

Morocco	1–0	Ivory Coast
Alioui 64'	Report

Stade d'Oyem, Oyem
Referee: Sidi Alioum (Cameroon)

Morocco	Ivory Coast

GK	12	Munir Mohand	(yellow card) 87'
RB	17	Nabil Dirar
CB	5	Medhi Benatia (c)	(yellow card) 30'
CB	4	Manuel da Costa
LB	2	Hamza Mendyl
CM	8	Karim El Ahmadi	(yellow card) 82'
CM	6	Romain Saïss
AM	14	Mbark Boussoufa
RW	11	Fayçal Fajr		(substituted off) 83'
LW	7	Youssef En-Nesyri
CF	20	Aziz Bouhaddouz		(substituted off) 42'
Substitutions:
FW	23	Rachid Alioui		(substituted in) 42' (substituted off) 90+2'
MF	19	Mounir Obbadi		(substituted in) 83'
FW	13	Khalid Boutaïb		(substituted in) 90+2'
Manager:
(France) Hervé Renard

GK	16	Sylvain Gbohouo
RB	17	Serge Aurier
CB	21	Eric Bailly	(yellow card) 58'
CB	19	Simon Deli
LB	5	Wilfried Kanon
CM	10	Cheick Doukouré		(substituted off) 52'
CM	20	Serey Dié (c)
CM	11	Franck Kessié		(substituted off) 85'
RF	9	Wilfried Zaha	(yellow card) 70'	(substituted off) 75'
CF	12	Wilfried Bony
LF	8	Salomon Kalou
Substitutions:
MF	6	Jean Seri		(substituted in) 52'
FW	14	Jonathan Kodjia		(substituted in) 75'
MF	15	Max Gradel		(substituted in) 85'
Manager:
(France) Michel Dussuyer

Man of the Match:
Salomon Kalou (Ivory Coast)

Assistant referees:
Ali Waleed Ahmed (Sudan)
Elvis Guy Noupue Nguegoue (Cameroon)
Fourth official:
Gehad Grisha (Egypt)

=== Togo vs DR Congo ===
24 January 2017
20:00

Togo	1–3	DR Congo
Laba 69'	Report	Kabananga 29'; Mubele 54'; M'Poku 80'

Stade de Port-Gentil, Port-Gentil
Referee: Malang Diedhiou (Senegal)

Togo	DR Congo

GK	23	Baba Tchagouni	(substituted off) 24'
RB	21	Djené Dakonam
CB	5	Serge Akakpo
CB	13	Sadat Ouro-Akoriko
LB	17	Serge Gakpé
CM	18	Lalawélé Atakora
CM	10	Floyd Ayité
RW	7	Mathieu Dossevi	(substituted off) 67'
AM	12	Razak Boukari	(substituted off) 78'
LW	22	Ihlas Bebou
CF	4	Emmanuel Adebayor (c)
Substitutions:
GK	1	Cédric Mensah	(substituted in) 24'
FW	19	Kodjo Fo-Doh Laba	(substituted in) 67'
MF	15	Alaixys Romao	(substituted in) 78'
Manager:
(France) Claude Le Roy

GK	1	Ley Matampi	(yellow card) 90+4'
RB	2	Issama Mpeko
CB	18	Merveille Bokadi
CB	5	Marcel Tisserand
LB	13	Joyce Lomalisa
CM	7	Youssouf Mulumbu (c)
CM	22	Chancel Mbemba
AM	10	Neeskens Kebano		(substituted off) 60'
RW	21	Firmin Ndombe Mubele		(substituted off) 68'
LW	6	Junior Kabananga		(substituted off) 83'
CF	12	Jonathan Bolingi
Substitutions:
MF	8	Paul-José M'Poku		(substituted in) 60'
MF	11	Jordan Botaka		(substituted in) 68'
FW	19	Jeremy Bokila		(substituted in) 83'
Manager:
Florent Ibengé

Man of the Match:
Junior Kabananga (DR Congo)

Assistant referees:
Djibril Camara (Senegal)
El Hadji Malick Samba (Senegal)
Fourth official:
Hamada Nampiandraza (Madagascar)
