= Junior Kabananga =

Congolese footballer

Personal information
- Full name: Junior Kabananga Kalonji
- Date of birth: 4 April 1989 (age 37)
- Place of birth: Kinshasa, Zaire
- Height: 1.90 m (6 ft 3 in)
- Position: Striker

Senior career*
Years	Team	Apps	(Gls)
2008–2009	MK Etanchéité		
2010–2013	Anderlecht	5	(1)
2011	→ Germinal Beerschot (loan)	2	(0)
2012–2013	→ Roeselare (loan)	29	(5)
2013–2015	Cercle Brugge	64	(13)
2015–2018	Astana	57	(29)
2016	→ Karabükspor (loan)	7	(2)
2018–2019	Al-Nassr	6	(4)
2018–2019	→ Astana (loan)	20	(2)
2019–2020	Qatar SC	5	(1)
2020	Shakhtyor Soligorsk	5	(0)
2021–2022	Suzhou Dongwu	22	(3)
2022–2023	Mioveni	10	(0)
2023	Maktaaral	7	(0)

International career^{‡}
2014–2018	DR Congo	22	(4)
- * Club domestic league appearances and goals as of 27 May 2023 ‡ National team caps and goals as of 9 September 2018

Junior Kabananga Kalonji (born 4 April 1989) is a Congolese former professional footballer who played as a striker. He was a member of DR Congo national team.

== Club career ==
Born in Kinshasa, Kabananga began his early career with FC MK Etanchéité.

=== Anderlecht ===
He made his senior debut for Belgian club Anderlecht in the 2010–11 season, although Anderlecht later admitted negligence when transferring the player from Democratic Republic of the Congo after a forged document was used.

=== Loans to Beerschot and Roeselare ===
He moved on loan to Germinal Beerschot in January 2011, and also spent the 2012–13 season on loan at Roeselare.

=== Cercle Brugge ===
He signed a permanent two-year contract with Cercle Brugge in July 2013.

=== Astana ===
In June 2015 he signed a two-and-a-half-year contract with Kazakhstan Premier League side FC Astana. In June 2016 he returned from the loan. On 27 July 2017, Kabananga signed a new two-year contract with Astana.

=== Karabükspor(loan) ===
On 1 February 2016, Kabananga joined Kardemir Karabükspor on loan until the end of the 2015–16 Turkish season.

=== Al-Nassr and Astana(loan) return ===
On 31 January 2018, Kabananga signed a $2 million two-and-a-half-year contract with Al-Nassr. He returned on loan to Astana in September 2018.

=== Suzhou Dongwu ===
On 10 June 2021, Kabananga joined China League One side Suzhou Dongwu.

=== Mioveni ===
In August 2022, Kabananga joined Liga I club Mioveni. He left the club in January 2023.

=== Maktaaral ===
In February 2023, Kabananga signed a contract with Kazakh club Maktaaral.

== International career ==
Kabananga made his international debut for DR Congo in 2014. In January 2015 he was named in the final squad for the 2015 Africa Cup of Nations.

== Career statistics ==
=== Club ===
As of match played 21 May 2023

Appearances and goals by club, season and competition
Club	Season	League			National Cup		Continental		Other		Total	
Club	Season	Division	Apps	Goals	Apps	Goals	Apps	Goals	Apps	Goals	Apps	Goals
Roeselare (loan)	2012–13	Belgian Second Division	29	5	0	0	—		—		29	5
Cercle Brugge	2013–14	Belgian Pro League	34	5	3	2	—		—		37	7
Cercle Brugge	2014–15	Belgian Pro League	30	8	2	0	—		—		32	8
Cercle Brugge	Total		64	13	5	2	—		—		69	15
Astana	2015	Kazakhstan Premier League	13	5	2	0	10	0	0	0	25	5
Astana	2016	Kazakhstan Premier League	13	5	2	3	12	2	0	0	27	10
Astana	2017	Kazakhstan Premier League	31	19	0	0	11	4	1	0	43	23
Astana	Total		57	29	4	3	33	6	1	0	95	38
Kardemir Karabükspor (loan)	2015–16	TFF First League	7	2	0	0	—		—		7	2
Al-Nassr	2017–18	Saudi Professional League	6	4	1	0	—		—		7	4
Astana (loan)	2018	Kazakhstan Premier League	6	0	0	0	11	0	—		17	0
Astana (loan)	2019	Kazakhstan Premier League	14	2	1	0	0	0	1	2	16	4
Astana (loan)	Total		20	2	1	0	11	0	1	2	33	4
Qatar	2019–20	Qatar Stars League	5	1	0	0	—		0	0	5	1
Shakhtyor Soligorsk	2020	Belarusian Premier League	5	0	0	0	—		—		5	0
Suzhou Dongwu	2021	China League One	22	3	1	0	—		—		23	3
Mioveni	2022–23	Liga I	10	0	4	1	—		—		14	1
Maktaaral	2023	Kazakhstan Premier League	7	0	2	0	—		—		9	0
Career total			232	59	18	6	44	6	2	2	297	73

=== International ===
As of match played 9 September 2018

Appearances and goals by national team and year
DR Congo	Year	Apps	Goals
DR Congo	2014	3	1
DR Congo	2015	8	0
DR Congo	2017	9	3
DR Congo	2018	2	0
DR Congo	Total	22	4

Scores and results list DR Congo's goal tally first.

List of international goals scored by Junior Kabananga
Goal	Date	Venue	Opponent	Score	Result	Competition
1.	15 October 2014	Stade Félix Houphouët-Boigny, Abidjan, Ivory Coast	Ivory Coast	2–1	4–3	2015 Africa Cup of Nations qualification
2.	16 January 2017	Stade d'Oyem, Oyem, Gabon	Morocco	1–0	1–0	2017 Africa Cup of Nations
3.	20 January 2017	Stade d'Oyem, Oyem, Gabon	Ivory Coast	2–1	2–2	2017 Africa Cup of Nations
4.	24 January 2017	Stade de Port-Gentil, Port-Gentil, Gabon	Togo	1–0	3–1	2017 Africa Cup of Nations

== Honours ==
Astana

- Kazakhstan Premier League: 2015, 2016, 2017, 2018
- Kazakhstan Cup: 2016
- Kazakhstan Super Cup: 2019

DR Congo

- Africa Cup of Nations bronze: 2015

Individual

- Africa Cup of Nations top scorer: 2017
- Africa Cup of Nations Team of the tournament: 2017
