= Paul-José M'Poku =

Congolese footballer

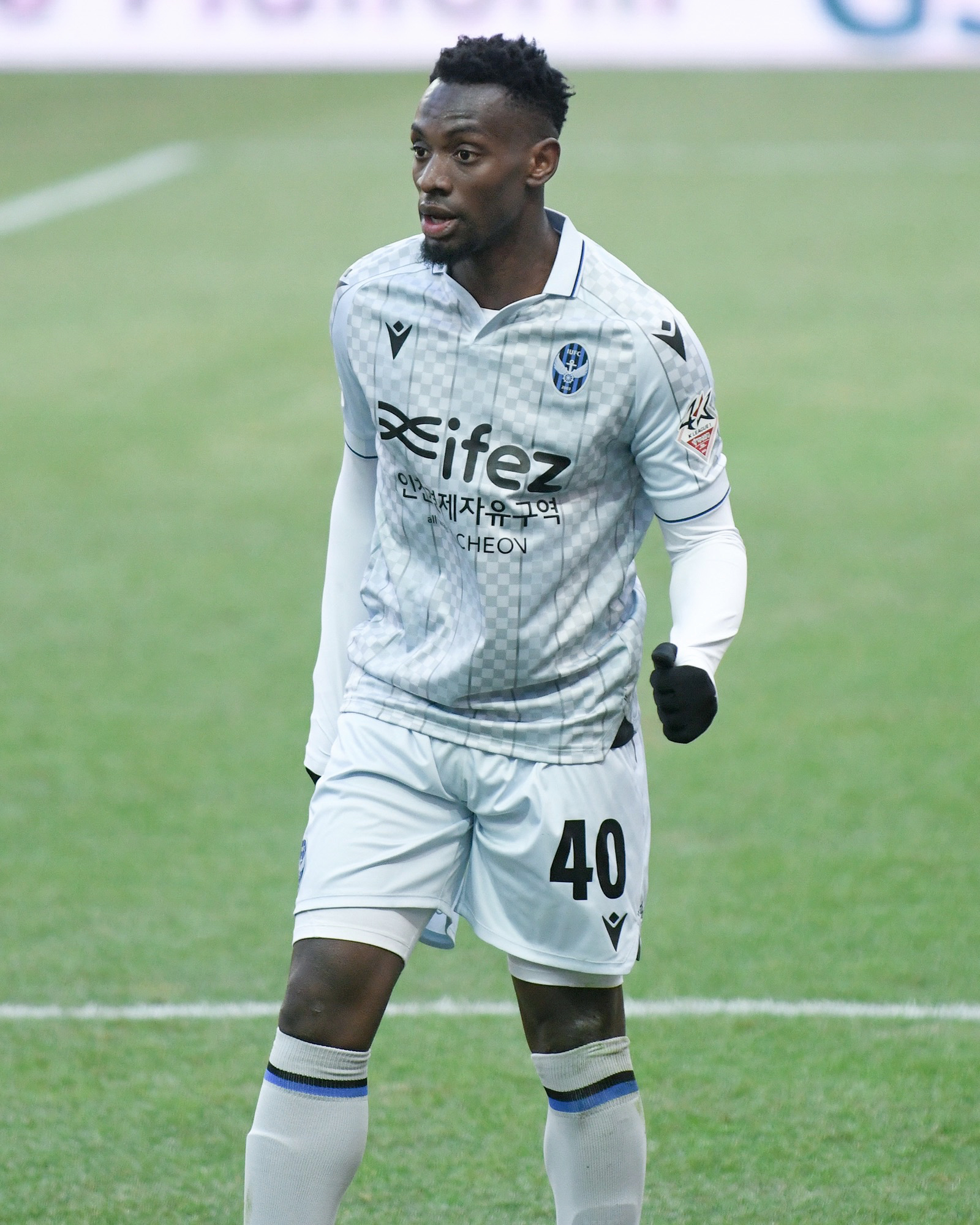
- M'Poku playing for Incheon United FC in 2023

Personal information
- Full name: Paul-José M'Poku Ebunge
- Date of birth: 19 April 1992 (age 34)
- Place of birth: Kinshasa, Zaire
- Height: 1.79 m (5 ft 10 1/2 in)
- Positions: Winger; attacking midfielder

Youth career
- 1998–2002: Cornesse FC
- 2002–2004: Entente Rechaintoise
- 2004–2008: Standard Liège
- 2008–2010: Tottenham Hotspur

Senior career*
Years	Team	Apps	(Gls)
2010–2011	Tottenham Hotspur	0	(0)
2010–2011	→ Leyton Orient (loan)	27	(3)
2011–2016	Standard Liège	71	(13)
2015	→ Cagliari (loan)	16	(3)
2015–2016	→ Chievo (loan)	20	(0)
2016–2017	Chievo	0	(0)
2016–2017	→ Panathinaikos (loan)	25	(2)
2017–2020	Standard Liège	69	(15)
2020–2021	Al Wahda	27	(6)
2021–2022	Konyaspor	27	(3)
2022–2025	Incheon United	52	(4)
2025	UTA Arad	10	(3)
2025–2026	Al-Batin	0	(0)

International career^{‡}
2007	Belgium U15	5	(2)
2007–2008	Belgium U16	9	(2)
2008–2009	Belgium U17	7	(5)
2009–2010	Belgium U18	7	(3)
2010–2011	Belgium U19	17	(3)
2011–2014	Belgium U21	20	(4)
2015–2022	DR Congo	22	(6)
- * Club domestic league appearances and goals as of 10 May 2025 ‡ National team caps and goals as of 11 June 2021

Paul-José M'Poku Ebunge (born 19 April 1992) is a Congolese former professional footballer who last played as a winger or as an attacking midfielder for Saudi club Al-Batin.

== Club career ==
=== Tottenham Hotspur ===
Born in Kinshasa, Zaire, M'Poku moved to Belgium as a child. Prior to joining Tottenham Hotspur in June 2008, he had played for Belgian club Standard Liège and signed his first professional contract on 24 April 2009.

Representing Tottenham Hotspur in the Premier Academy League, he was a prolific scorer and was included in the squad for the FA Cup replay against Bolton Wanderers on 26 February 2010.

==== Loan to Leyton Orient ====
On 24 September 2010, M'Poku moved to Leyton Orient on a month's loan, to last until 23 October.

He made his professional debut coming on as a substitute for Orient against Walsall on 28 September. After impressing Orient manager Russell Slade, M'Poku's loan was extended until 8 January 2011. He scored his first goal in English football with Orient's third in the 8–2 thrashing of Droylsden in the FA Cup on 7 December. His loan was subsequently extended until the end of the season. He scored two league goals for Orient: their third in the 4–2 win over Colchester United on 3 January, and a late 25-yard winner against Oldham Athletic on 12 March. He made 35 appearances for Orient in all competitions.

=== Standard Liège ===
Without making a first team appearance at Tottenham Hotspur, he was transferred back to Standard Liège in July 2011 for an undisclosed fee, signing a four-year contract.

M’Poku remained out of the first team at the start of the 2011–12 season until on 28 August 2011, he made his first team appearance as an un-used substitute, in a 1–1 draw against Beerschot. M’Poku then made his Standard Liege debut, where he came on as a substitute for Geoffrey Mujangi Bia in the last minutes, in a 2–1 win over Club Brugge on 6 November 2011. In his first season at Standard Liege, M’Poku was featured less in the first team under the management of José Riga., as he made eight appearances for the club.

The 2012–13 season saw M’Poku get more playing time at the club under the new management of Mircea Rednic. M'Poku scored his first goal on 23 November 2012 in a 3–0 win against Lierse. M’Poku then provided a double assist, in a 3–0 win over Beerschot on 27 December 2012. In the Play-Offs, M’Poku went to score five more goals against Zulte Waregem (scored against them in another encounter), Genk, Lokeren and Club Brugge despite suffering from a knee injury, but managed to recover from it. M’Poku then scored a hat-trick in a 7–0 win over Gent on 26 May 2013 to help the club qualify for the Europa League next season. M’Poku finished the 2012–13 season, making thirty one appearance and scoring nine times in all competitions.

The 2013–14 season saw M’Poku being linked with a move to rivals, Anderlecht, though the club's owner, Roland Duchâtelet, said there were no offers made for M’Poku from Anderlecht. Despite this, M’Poku remained at the club. M’Poku started the 2013–14 season well when he scored his first goals of the season, in a 3–1 win over KR in the first leg of second round of Europa League and scored his first league goal of the season, in a 2–0 win over Genk on 11 August 2013. M’Poku scored in the second leg of the Europa League Qualification Round, in a 3–0 win over Minsk and scored his second league goal, in a 2–0 win over Kortrijk. By the end of 2013, M’Poku scored against Bruxelles, Cercle Brugge, Red Bull Salzburg, Lierse and Genk. M’Poku later added three goals in the 2013–14 season against Cercle Brugge, Zulte Waregem and Lokeren. At the end of the 2013–14 season, which saw Standard Liege failing to win the league, M’Poku made forty–nine appearances and scored twelve times. He was also nominated for the Ebony Shoes, but lost out to Thorgan Hazard. Despite this, M’Poku was rewarded with a new contract with the club, keeping him until 2018.

In the 2014–15 season, M’Poku continued to attract interests around Europe and Qatar, but remained at the club. M’Poku started the season well when he scored in the second leg of the third round of Champions League, in a 2–1 win over Panathinaikos and was awarded Man of the Match by Sporza. Then on 21 September 2014, M’Poku scored his first league goal of the season and set up a goal, in a 2–0 win over Waasland-Beveren. He also four more goals by November against Zulte Waregem, Anderlecht, Mechelen, regaining Europa League Champions Sevilla and Genk. However, M’Poku suffered injuries by the end of 2014.

In the January transfer window, M’Poku continued to attract interests and was on a verge of joining Qatar side Al-Arabi and expected to be loaned out to a European club. However, the move suffered a huge setback over his fitness and the move was eventually cancelled. After the move was broken down, M’Poku was then linked with a move to Bundesliga side Mainz 05 and Serie A side Inter Milan.

==== Loan to Cagliari ====
On 1 February 2015, M'Poku signed for Cagliari on loan until the end of the season. Upon joining the club, M’Poku revealed that then-Manager Gianfranco Zola persuaded him to join the club.

M’Poku made his Cagliari debut, where he came on as a substitute for Alejandro González in the 61st minute, and scored his first goal for the club, in a 2–1 loss against Roma on 8 February 2015. Two weeks later, on 23 February 2015, M’Poku made his first start, playing 90 minutes, in a 2–1 loss against Inter Milan. M’Poku scored his second Cagliari goal and set up one of the goals, in a 4–0 win over Parma on 4 May 2015. In the last game of the season, M’Poku scored his third Cagliari goal and set up one of the goals, in a 4–3 win over Udinese. M’Poku made sixteen appearances and scoring three times, but was unable to help the club survive relegation to Serie B next season.

=== Chievo ===
After being unregistered by Standard Liege ahead of the new season, it was announced on 13 July 2015, M’Poku was loaned out to another Italian club by joining Chievo on a season-loan deal for the 2015–16 season.

M’Poku made his Chievo debut in the opening game of the season, where he made his first start and played 45 minutes before being substituted, in a 3–1 win over Empoli. However, in a 1–0 loss against Inter Milan on 23 September 2015, M’Poku suffered an injury after colliding with Inter's Felipe Melo and was substituted after playing 14 minutes. M’Poku then made his return to the first team on 28 October 2015, where he came on as a substitute in the second half, in a 1–0 loss against A.C. Milan. However, M’Poku struggled to score goal, like he did at Cagliari, as he made twenty appearances and scoring none, as he spent most of the season on the substitute bench.

After a loan spell at Chievo, M’Poku joined the club on a permanent basis, signing a three–year contract on 31 May 2016.

==== Loan to Panathinaikos ====
On 31 August 2016, M'Poku signed a year long-term loan with Greek giants Panathinaikos on loan from Chievo, for an undisclosed fee. On 30 October he scored his first goal with the club in a 2–0 home League game against Iraklis.

=== Return to Standard Liège ===
On 3 July 2017, M’Poku decided to leave Panathinaikos as he agreed to return to his former club of Standard Liege. According to various sources, the Belgian Club moved to sign the Congolese winger, by putting on the table a bid of €1.5 million. M’Poku underwent medical examinations before signing a five-year contract.

On 17 March 2018 he played as Standard Liege beat Genk 1–0 in extra time to win the 2018 Belgian Cup Final and qualify for the UEFA Europa League.

=== Al-Wahda ===
On 21 January 2020, Al Wahda signed M'Poku from Standard Liège.

=== Incheon United ===
On 12 December 2022, M'Poku joined Incheon United FC of South Korean K League 1.

=== UTA Arad ===
On 17 February 2025, M'Poku signed a contract with Romanian Liga I club FC UTA Arad.

=== Al-Batin ===
On 10 September 2025, M'Poku joined Saudi FDL club Al-Batin. He retired in March 2026.

== International career ==
M'Poku represented Belgium at youth level, such as, Belgium U15, Belgium U16, Belgium U17, Belgium U18, Belgium U19, and Belgium U21.

On 19 February 2015, M'Poku announced his decision to play for DR Congo despite being monitored by the senior team. M'Poku scored on his DR Congo debut in the friendly match on 28 March 2015, in a 2–1 loss against Iraq. In January 2017 M'poku was selected in DR Congo's final squad for the 2017 Africa Cup of Nations in Gabon.

== Personal life ==
Though he was linked with a move to Anderlecht, M’Poku stated he expressed his dislike towards the club on his Twitter account.

M'Poku's brother Albert Sambi Lokonga is also a professional footballer.

== Career statistics ==
=== Club ===
As of 10 May 2025

Club	Season	League			National Cup		League Cup		Continental		Other		Total	
Club	Season	Division	Apps	Goals	Apps	Goals	Apps	Goals	Apps	Goals	Apps	Goals	Apps	Goals
Leyton Orient (loan)	2010–11	League One	27	3	7	1	—		—		1 (Note: Appearances in EFL Trophy)	0	35	4
Standard Liège	2011–12	Belgian Pro League	8	0	2	0	—		—		4 (Note: Appearances in Belgian Pro League Championship play-offs)	0	14	0
Standard Liège	2012–13	Belgian Pro League	18	1	2	0	—		—		11 (Note: Nine appearances and five goals in Belgian Pro League Championship play-offs, two appearances and three goals in Testmatches Europa League)	8	31	9
Standard Liège	2013–14	Belgian Pro League	27	7	2	1	—		10 (Note: Appearances in UEFA Europa League)	3	10	1	49	12
Standard Liège	2014–15	Belgian Pro League	18	5	0	0	—		9 (Note: Four appearances and one goal in UEFA Champions League, five appearances and one goal in UEFA Europa League)	2	—		27	7
Standard Liège	Total		71	13	6	1	—		19	5	25	9	121	28
Cagliari (loan)	2014–15	Serie A	16	3	—		—		—		—		16	3
Chievo (loan)	2015–16	Serie A	20	0	0	0	—		—		—		20	0
Panathinaikos (loan)	2016–17	Super League Greece	25	2	7	2	—		4	0	—		36	4
Standard Liège	2017–18	Belgian First Division A	28	5	5	0	—		—		6 (Note: Appearances in Belgian First Division European play-offs)	0	39	5
Standard Liège	2018–19	Belgian First Division A	23	7	0	0	—		6 (Note: Two appearances in UEFA Champions League, four appearances in UEFA Europa League)	0	8 (Note: Seven appearances and one goal in Belgian First Division A Championship play-offs, one appearance in Belgian Super Cup)	1	37	8
Standard Liège	2019–20	Belgian First Division A	18	3	3	0	—		6	1	—		27	4
Standard Liège	Total		69	15	8	0	—		12	1	14	1	103	17
Al Wahda	2019–20	UAE Pro League	7	1	—		—		2 (Note: Appearances in AFC Champions League)	1	—		9	2
Al Wahda	2020–21	UAE Pro League	20	5	1	0	0	0	—		—		21	5
Al Wahda	Total		27	6	1	0	0	0	2	1	—		30	7
Konyaspor	2021–22	Süper Lig	27	3	2	0	—		—		—		29	3
Konyaspor	2022–23	Süper Lig	0	0	—		—		0	0	—		0	0
Konyaspor	Total		27	3	2	0	—		—		—		29	3
Incheon United	2023	K League 1	24	3	3	1	—		6	1	—		33	5
Incheon United	2024	K League 1	28	1	2	0	—		—		—		30	1
Incheon United	Total		52	4	5	1	—		6	1	—		63	6
UTA Arad	2024–25	Liga I	10	3	—		—		—		—		10	3
Career Total			344	52	36	5	0	0	43	8	40	10	463	75

=== International ===
As of match played 11 June 2021

Appearances and goals by national team and year
National team	Year	Apps	Goals
DR Congo
DR Congo	2015	2	1
DR Congo	2016	4	2
DR Congo	2017	4	3
DR Congo	2018	1	0
DR Congo	2019	9	0
DR Congo	2020	0	0
DR Congo	2021	2	0
DR Congo	2022	0	0
Total		22	6

Scores and results list Congo DR's goal tally first

No.	Date	Venue	Opponent	Score	Result	Competition	Ref.
1.	28 March 2015	Khalid Bin Mohammed Stadium, Sharjah, United Arab Emirates	Iraq	1–1	1–2	Friendly	
2.	5 June 2016	Rabemananjara Stadium, Mahajanga, Madagascar	Madagascar	2–0	6–1	2017 Africa Cup of Nations qualification	
3.	5 June 2016	Rabemananjara Stadium, Mahajanga, Madagascar	Madagascar	4–0	6–1	2017 Africa Cup of Nations qualification	
4.	24 January 2017	Stade de Port-Gentil, Port-Gentil, Gabon	Togo	3–1	3–1	2017 Africa Cup of Nations	
5.	29 January 2017	Stade d'Oyem, Oyem, Gabon	Ghana	1–1	1–2	2017 Africa Cup of Nations	
6.	5 September 2017	Stade des Martyrs, Kinshasa, DR Congo	Tunisia	2–0	2–2	2018 FIFA World Cup qualification	

== Honours ==
Standard Liège

- Belgian Cup: 2017–18
- Belgian Super Cup runner-up: 2011, 2018
