= 2017 Africa Cup of Nations =

31st edition of the Africa Cup of Nations

Coupe d'Afrique des Nations 2017

Tournament details
- Host country: Gabon
- Dates: 14 January – 5 February
- Teams: 16
- Venues: 4 (in 4 host cities)

Final positions
- Champions: Cameroon (5th title)
- Runners-up: Egypt
- Third place: Burkina Faso
- Fourth place: Ghana

Tournament statistics
- Matches played: 32
- Goals scored: 66 (2.06 per match)
- Top scorer(s): (Democratic Republic of the Congo) Junior Kabananga (3 goals)
- Best player: (Cameroon) Christian Bassogog
- Fair play award: Egypt

The 2017 Africa Cup of Nations (abbreviated as AFCON 2017 or CAN 2017), known as the Total 2017 Africa Cup of Nations for sponsorship reasons, was the 31st edition of the Africa Cup of Nations, the biennial international men's football championship of Africa organized by the Confederation of African Football (CAF). The tournament was scheduled to be hosted by Libya, until CAF rescinded its hosting rights in August 2014 due to the Second Libyan civil war. The tournament was instead hosted by Gabon. This event was also part of the Africa Cup of Nations 60th Anniversary.

Cameroon won their fifth title after defeating seven-time champions Egypt 2–1 in the final. Burkina Faso finished third after beating Ghana 1–0 in the third place play-off.

As champions, Cameroon qualified for the 2017 FIFA Confederations Cup in Russia. Tournament hosts Gabon and defending champions Ivory Coast were both eliminated in the group stage.

== Host selection ==
=== First bidding ===
Bids :

Nation	Last hosted
Botswana	—
Cameroon	1972
DR Congo	—
Guinea	—
Morocco	1988
South Africa	2013
Zambia	—
Zimbabwe	—

CAF received 3 bids before 30 September 2010, the deadline, to host either the 2015 Africa Cup of Nations or 2017 from DR Congo, Morocco and South Africa. All three bids were originally put on a shortlist. CAF then began an inspection procedure, on November and December 2010, intending to visit each bidding country to view stadiums, infrastructure, and football interest. They inspected the DR Congo first. Shortly after the inspection, DR Congo informed CAF that they would be withdrawing their bids for both the 2015 and 2017 Africa Cup of Nations tournaments. Morocco was the next country to be inspected, with CAF visiting the country in early November 2010. South Africa was inspected in December 2010.

Nation	Last hosted
Morocco	1988
South Africa	2013

On 29 January, during the 2011 CAF Super Cup, the CAF executive committee decided that Morocco would host 2015 Africa Cup of Nations, while the 2017 edition would be held in South Africa. However, due to the Libyan Civil War, Libya and South Africa traded years with South Africa hosting in 2013 and Libya hosting in 2017.

=== Second bidding ===
Bids :

- Algeria
- Egypt
- Gabon
- Ghana

After Libya was withdrawn as the venue on 22 August 2014, the CAF announced that they would be receiving applications for the new hosts until 30 September 2014.

Algeria, Egypt, Gabon, and Ghana, were determined by the CAF to be compliant with the host criteria. Later, Egypt withdrew.

Other countries which expressed an interest but did not bid included Ethiopia, Mali, and Tanzania. Kenya discussed a joint bid with neighbors Rwanda and Uganda, but eventually bid alone.

On 8 April 2015, CAF President Issa Hayatou announced Gabon as the replacement hosts following votes by the CAF Executive Committee.

Results
Nation	Votes
Gabon	9
Algeria	4
Ghana	0
Egypt	Withdrew
Total votes	13

== Qualification ==
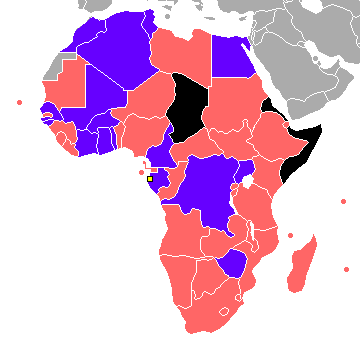
Qualified Failed to qualify Withdrew or did not enter Not part of CAF

The draw for the qualification stage took place on 8 April 2015, immediately after the announcement of the host nation. The host nation team were also drawn into a group and would play games against those in that group; however, those matches would only be considered as friendlies and not counted for the standings.

51 nations entered the qualifying stage with Eritrea and Somalia declining to enter and Chad withdrawing.

Due to the cancellation of Morocco being hosts of the 2015 edition, the national team of Morocco were originally banned by CAF from entering the 2017 and 2019 Africa Cups of Nations. However, the ban was overturned by the Court of Arbitration for Sport, allowing Morocco to enter the tournament.

Three-time champions Nigeria did not qualify.

=== Qualified teams ===
The following 16 teams qualified for the final tournament.

Team	Method of qualification	Date of qualification	Finals appearance	Last appearance	Previous best performance	FIFA ranking at start of event
Gabon	Hosts	8 April 2015	7th	2015	Quarter-finals (1996, 2012)	108
Morocco	Group F winners	29 March 2016	16th	2013	Winners (1976)	57
Algeria	Group J winners	2 June 2016	17th	2015	Winners (1990)	39
Cameroon	Group M winners	3 June 2016	18th	2015	Winners (1984, 1988, 2000, 2002)	62
Senegal	Group K winners	4 June 2016	14th	2015	Runners-up (2002)	33
Egypt	Group G winners	4 June 2016	23rd	2010	Winners (1957, 1959, 1986, 1998, 2006, 2008, 2010)	35
Ghana	Group H winners	5 June 2016	21st	2015	Winners (1963, 1965, 1978, 1982)	54
Guinea-Bissau	Group E winners	5 June 2016	1st	none	Debut	68
Zimbabwe	Group L winners	5 June 2016	3rd	2006	Group stage (2004, 2006)	103
Mali	Group C winners	5 June 2016	10th	2015	Runners-up (1972)	64
Ivory Coast	Group I winners	3 September 2016	22nd	2015	Winners (1992, 2015)	34
Uganda	Group D runners-up	4 September 2016	6th	1978	Runners-up (1978)	73
Burkina Faso	Group D winners	4 September 2016	11th	2015	Runners-up (2013)	53
Tunisia	Group A winners	4 September 2016	18th	2015	Winners (2004)	36
DR Congo	Group B winners	4 September 2016	18th	2015	Winners (1968, 1974)	49
Togo	Group A runners-up	4 September 2016	8th	2013	Quarter-finals (2013)	90

== Venues ==
Location of the Gabonese host cities of the 2025 Africa Cup of Nations
1 Libreville
2 Franceville
3 Oyem
4 Port-Gentil

The four venues were confirmed in October 2016.

City	Stadium	Capacity
Libreville	Stade de l'Amitié	40,000
Franceville	Stade de Franceville	25,000
Oyem	Stade d'Oyem	20,500
Port-Gentil	Stade de Port-Gentil	20,000

== Squads ==
Each team could register a squad of 23 players.

== Match officials ==
The following referees were chosen for the 2017 Africa Cup of Nations.

Referees

- (Algeria) Mehdi Abid Charef
- (Botswana) Joshua Bondo
- (Cameroon) Sidi Alioum
- (Ivory Coast) Denis Dembélé
- (Egypt) Gehad Grisha
- (Ethiopia) Bamlak Tessema Weyesa
- (Gabon) Eric Otogo-Castane
- (The Gambia) Bakary Gassama
- (Madagascar) Hamada Nampiandraza
- (Morocco) Redouane Jiyed
- (Mali) Mahamadou Keita
- (Mauritania) Ali Lemghaifry
- (South Africa) Daniel Bennett
- (Senegal) Malang Diedhiou
- (Seychelles) Bernard Camille
- (Tunisia) Youssef Essrayri
- (Zambia) Janny Sikazwe

Assistant referees

- (Algeria) Albdelhak Etchiali
- (Angola) Jerson Emiliano Dos Santos
- (Burundi) Jean-Claude Birumushahu
- (Cameroon) Evarist Menkouande
- (Cameroon) Elvis Guy Noupue Nguegoue
- (Ivory Coast) Marius Donatien Tan
- (Egypt) Tahssen Abo El Sadat Bedyer
- (Gabon) Théophile Vinga
- (Guinea) Aboubacar Doumbouya
- (Kenya) Marwa Range
- (Morocco) Redouane Achik
- (Mozambique) Arsénio Chadreque Marengula
- (Niger) Yahaya Mahamadou
- (Nigeria) Abel Baba
- (Democratic Republic of the Congo) Olivier Safari Kabene
- (Senegal) Djibril Camara
- (Senegal) El Hadji Malick Samba
- (South Africa) Zakhele Siwela
- (Sudan) Ali Waleed Ahmed
- (Sudan) Mohammed Abdallah Ibrahim
- (Tunisia) Anouar Hmila

== Format ==
Only the hosts received an automatic qualification spot; the other 15 teams qualified through a qualification tournament. At the finals, the 16 teams were drawn into four groups of four teams each. The teams in each group played a single round robin. After the group stage, the top two teams from each group advanced to the quarter-finals. The quarter-final winners advanced to the semi-finals. The semi-final losers played in a third place match, while the semi-final winners played in the final.

== Draw ==
The draw took place on 19 October 2016, 18:30 UTC+1, in Libreville, Gabon.

The seedings approved by the Organising Committee of the Africa Cup of Nations at its meeting on Monday, 26 September 2016 at the CAF headquarters in Cairo, Egypt, was determined taking into account the performance of the qualified teams during the following competitions:

- Africa Cup of Nations final tournaments (2012, 2013, 2015)
- Africa Cup of Nations qualifiers (2013, 2015, 2017)
- FIFA World Cup (2014)
- FIFA World Cup qualifiers (2014)

Pot 1	Pot 2	Pot 3	Pot 4
Gabon (22 pts; hosts, assigned to A1); Ivory Coast (63.5 pts; title holders, assigned to C1); Ghana (56.5 pts); Algeria (43.5 pts)	Tunisia (34.5 pts); Mali (33.5 pts); Burkina Faso (33.5 pts); DR Congo (29.5 pts)	Cameroon (29 pts); Senegal (24 pts); Morocco (18.5 pts); Egypt (15.5 pts)	Togo (15.5 pts); Uganda (12 pts); Zimbabwe (10 pts); Guinea-Bissau (8.5 pts)

== Group stage ==
Group winners and runners-up advanced to the quarter-finals.

All times are local, WAT (UTC+1).

=== Tiebreakers ===
The teams were ranked according to points (3 points for a win, 1 point for a draw, 0 points for a loss). If tied on points, tiebreakers were applied in the following order (Regulations Article 74):

1. Number of points obtained in games between the teams concerned;
2. Goal difference in games between the teams concerned;
3. Goals scored in games between the teams concerned;
4. If, after applying criteria 1 to 3 to teams concerned, two or three teams still had an equal ranking, criteria 1 to 3 were reapplied exclusively to the matches between these teams in question to determine their final rankings. If this procedure did not lead to a decision, criteria 5 to 7 applied;
5. Goal difference in all games;
6. Goals scored in all games;
7. Drawing of lots.

=== Group A ===
Pos	Team	Pld	W	D	L	GF	GA	GD	Pts	Qualification
1	Burkina Faso	3	1	2	0	4	2	+2	5	Advance to knockout stage
2	Cameroon	3	1	2	0	3	2	+1	5	Advance to knockout stage
3	Gabon (H)	3	0	3	0	2	2	0	3	
4	Guinea-Bissau	3	0	1	2	2	5	−3	1	

Source: CAF
(H) Hosts
14 January 2017
17:00

Gabon	1–1	Guinea-Bissau
Aubameyang 52'	Report	Juary 90+1'

Stade de l'Amitié, Libreville
Attendance: 39,230
Referee: Gehad Grisha (Egypt)
14 January 2017
20:00

Burkina Faso	1–1	Cameroon
Dayo 75'	Report	Moukandjo 35'

Stade de l'Amitié, Libreville
Referee: Janny Sikazwe (Zambia)

18 January 2017
17:00

Gabon	1–1	Burkina Faso
Aubameyang 38' (pen.)	Report	Nakoulma 23'

Stade de l'Amitié, Libreville
Referee: Bakary Gassama (Gambia)
18 January 2017
20:00

Cameroon	2–1	Guinea-Bissau
Siani 61'; Ngadeu-Ngadjui 78'	Report	Piqueti 13'

Stade de l'Amitié, Libreville
Referee: Youssef Essrayri (Tunisia)

22 January 2017
20:00

Cameroon	0–0	Gabon
	Report

Stade de l'Amitié, Libreville
Referee: Daniel Bennett (South Africa)
22 January 2017
20:00

Guinea-Bissau	0–2	Burkina Faso
	Report	Rudinilson 12' (o.g.); B. Traoré 58'

Stade de Franceville, Franceville
Referee: Bamlak Tessema Weyesa (Ethiopia)

=== Group B ===
Pos	Team	Pld	W	D	L	GF	GA	GD	Pts	Qualification
1	Senegal	3	2	1	0	6	2	+4	7	Advance to knockout stage
2	Tunisia	3	2	0	1	6	5	+1	6	Advance to knockout stage
3	Algeria	3	0	2	1	5	6	−1	2	
4	Zimbabwe	3	0	1	2	4	8	−4	1	

Source: CAF
15 January 2017
17:00

Algeria	2–2	Zimbabwe
Mahrez 12', 82'	Report	Mahachi 17'; Mushekwi 29' (pen.)

Stade de Franceville, Franceville
Referee: Bamlak Tessema Weyesa (Ethiopia)
15 January 2017
20:00

Tunisia	0–2	Senegal
	Report	Mané 10' (pen.); Mbodji 30'

Stade de Franceville, Franceville
Referee: Sidi Alioum (Cameroon)

19 January 2017
17:00

Algeria	1–2	Tunisia
Hanni 90+2'	Report	Mandi 50' (o.g.); Sliti 66' (pen.)

Stade de Franceville, Franceville
Referee: Bernard Camille (Seychelles)
19 January 2017
20:00

Senegal	2–0	Zimbabwe
Mané 9'; Saivet 13'	Report

Stade de Franceville, Franceville
Referee: Redouane Jiyed (Morocco)

23 January 2017
20:00

Senegal	2–2	Algeria
Diop 43'; Sow 53'	Report	Slimani 10', 52'

Stade de Franceville, Franceville
Referee: Joshua Bondo (Botswana)
23 January 2017
20:00

Zimbabwe	2–4	Tunisia
Musona 42'; Ndoro 58'	Report	Sliti 9'; Msakni 22'; Khenissi 36'; Khazri 45' (pen.)

Stade de l'Amitié, Libreville
Referee: Denis Dembélé (Ivory Coast)

=== Group C ===
Pos	Team	Pld	W	D	L	GF	GA	GD	Pts	Qualification
1	DR Congo	3	2	1	0	6	3	+3	7	Advance to knockout stage
2	Morocco	3	2	0	1	4	2	+2	6	Advance to knockout stage
3	Ivory Coast	3	0	2	1	2	3	−1	2	
4	Togo	3	0	1	2	2	6	−4	1	

Source: CAF
16 January 2017
17:00

Ivory Coast	0–0	Togo
	Report

Stade d'Oyem, Oyem
Referee: Eric Otogo-Castane (Gabon)
16 January 2017
20:00

DR Congo	1–0	Morocco
Kabananga 55'	Report

Stade d'Oyem, Oyem
Referee: Hamada Nampiandraza (Madagascar)

20 January 2017
17:00

Ivory Coast	2–2	DR Congo
Bony 25'; Dié 67'	Report	Kebano 10'; Kabananga 28'

Stade d'Oyem, Oyem
Referee: Janny Sikazwe (Zambia)
20 January 2017
20:00

Morocco	3–1	Togo
Bouhaddouz 14'; Saïss 21'; En-Nesyri 72'	Report	Dossevi 5'

Stade d'Oyem, Oyem
Referee: Mahamadou Keita (Mali)

24 January 2017
20:00

Morocco	1–0	Ivory Coast
Alioui 64'	Report

Stade d'Oyem, Oyem
Referee: Sidi Alioum (Cameroon)
24 January 2017
20:00

Togo	1–3	DR Congo
Laba 69'	Report	Kabananga 29'; Mubele 54'; M'Poku 80'

Stade de Port-Gentil, Port-Gentil
Referee: Malang Diedhiou (Senegal)

=== Group D ===
Pos	Team	Pld	W	D	L	GF	GA	GD	Pts	Qualification
1	Egypt	3	2	1	0	2	0	+2	7	Advance to knockout stage
2	Ghana	3	2	0	1	2	1	+1	6	Advance to knockout stage
3	Mali	3	0	2	1	1	2	−1	2	
4	Uganda	3	0	1	2	1	3	−2	1	

Source: CAF
17 January 2017
17:00

Ghana	1–0	Uganda
A. Ayew 32' (pen.)	Report

Stade de Port-Gentil, Port-Gentil
Referee: Joshua Bondo (Botswana)
17 January 2017
20:00

Mali	0–0	Egypt
	Report

Stade de Port-Gentil, Port-Gentil
Referee: Daniel Bennett (South Africa)

21 January 2017
17:00

Ghana	1–0	Mali
Gyan 21'	Report

Stade de Port-Gentil, Port-Gentil
Referee: Mehdi Abid Charef (Algeria)
21 January 2017
20:00

Egypt	1–0	Uganda
Said 89'	Report

Stade de Port-Gentil, Port-Gentil
Referee: Malang Diedhiou (Senegal)

25 January 2017
20:00

Egypt	1–0	Ghana
M. Salah 11'	Report

Stade de Port-Gentil, Port-Gentil
Referee: Bakary Gassama (Gambia)
25 January 2017
20:00

Uganda	1–1	Mali
Miya 70'	Report	Bissouma 73'

Stade d'Oyem, Oyem
Referee: Ali Lemghaifry (Mauritania)

== Knockout stage ==
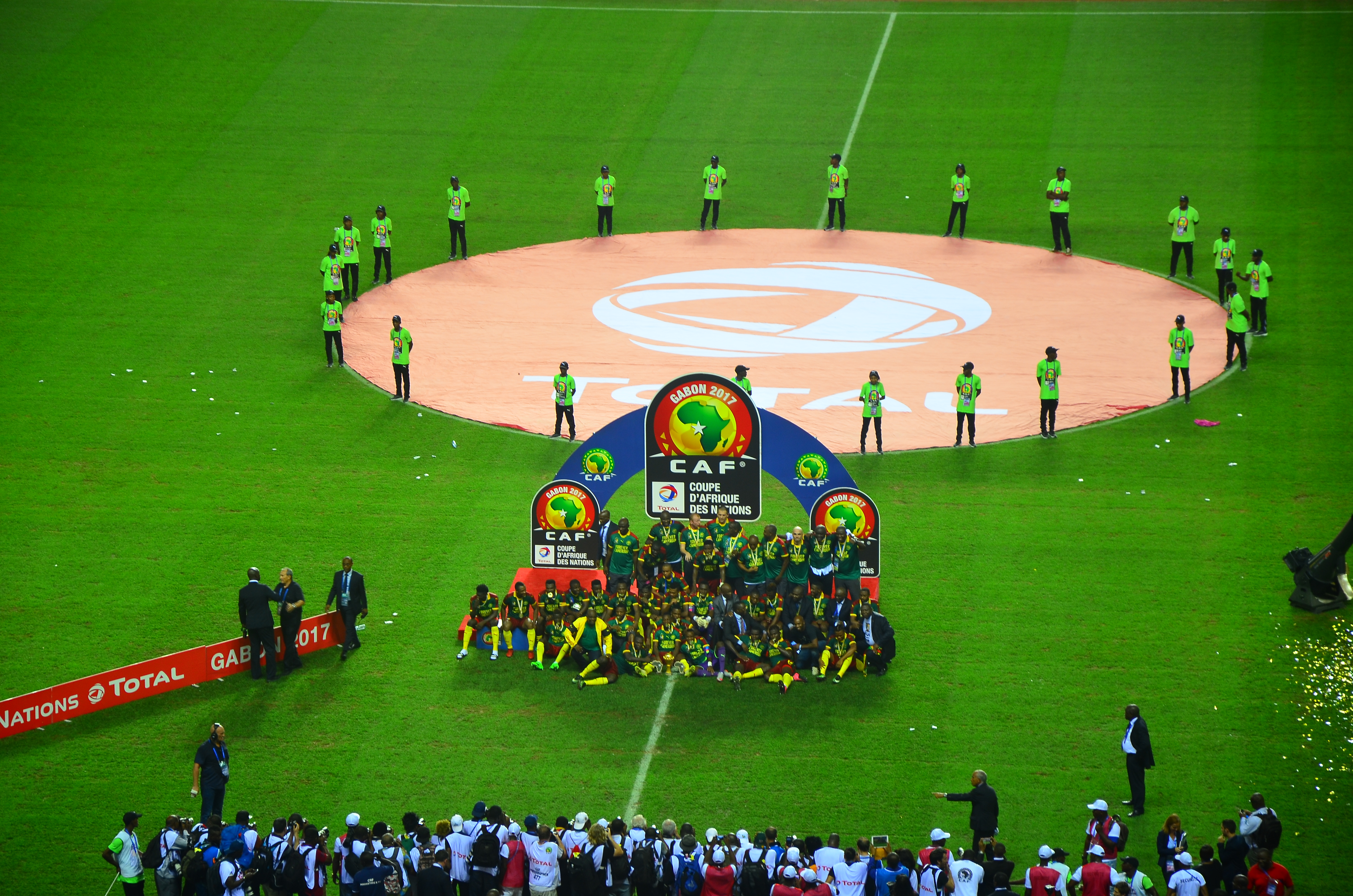
Cameroon players celebrating their victory in the final

In the knockout stages, if a match was level at the end of normal playing time, extra time was played (two periods of 15 minutes each) and followed, if necessary, by a penalty shoot-out to determine the winner, except for the play-off for third place, where no extra time was played (Regulations Article 75).

=== Bracket ===
Quarter-finals
28 January – Libreville
Burkina Faso	2
Tunisia	0
29 January – Port-Gentil
Egypt	1
Morocco	0
28 January – Franceville
Senegal	0 (4)
Cameroon (p)	0 (5)
29 January – Oyem
DR Congo	1
Ghana	2

Semi-finals
1 February – Libreville
Burkina Faso	1 (3)
Egypt (p)	1 (4)
2 February – Franceville
Cameroon	2
Ghana	0

Final
5 February – Libreville
Egypt	1
Cameroon	2
Third place play-off
4 February – Port-Gentil
Burkina Faso	1
Ghana	0

=== Quarter-finals ===
28 January 2017
17:00

Burkina Faso	2–0	Tunisia
Bancé 81'; Nakoulma 85'	Report

Stade de l'Amitié, Libreville
Referee: Daniel Bennett (South Africa)

28 January 2017
20:00

Senegal	0–0 (a.e.t.)	Cameroon
	Report
Penalties
Koulibaly (penalty scored); Mbodji (penalty scored); Sow (penalty scored); Saivet (penalty scored); Mané (penalty missed)	4–5	(penalty scored) Moukandjo; (penalty scored) Oyongo; (penalty scored) Teikeu; (penalty scored) Zoua; (penalty scored) Aboubakar

Stade de Franceville, Franceville
Referee: Janny Sikazwe (Zambia)

29 January 2017
17:00

DR Congo	1–2	Ghana
M'Poku 68'	Report	J. Ayew 63'; A. Ayew 78' (pen.)

Stade d'Oyem, Oyem
Referee: Bernard Camille (Seychelles)

29 January 2017
20:00

Egypt	1–0	Morocco
Kahraba 88'	Report

Stade de Port-Gentil, Port-Gentil
Referee: Eric Otogo-Castane (Gabon)

=== Semi-finals ===
1 February 2017
20:00

Burkina Faso	1–1 (a.e.t.)	Egypt
Bancé 73'	Report	M. Salah 66'
Penalties
Al. Traoré (penalty scored); Diawara (penalty scored); Yago (penalty scored); Koffi (penalty missed); B. Traoré (penalty missed)	3–4	(penalty missed) Said; (penalty scored) Sobhi; (penalty scored) Hegazy; (penalty scored) M. Salah; (penalty scored) Warda

Stade de l'Amitié, Libreville
Referee: Malang Diedhiou (Senegal)

2 February 2017
20:00

Cameroon	2–0	Ghana
Ngadeu-Ngadjui 72'; Bassogog 90+3'	Report

Stade de Franceville, Franceville
Referee: Bakary Gassama (Gambia)

=== Third place play-off ===
4 February 2017
20:00

Burkina Faso	1–0	Ghana
Al. Traoré 89'	Report

Stade de Port-Gentil, Port-Gentil
Attendance: 20,720
Referee: Mehdi Abid Charef (Algeria)

=== Final ===
5 February 2017
20:00

Egypt	1–2	Cameroon
Elneny 22'	Report	Nkoulou 59'; Aboubakar 88'

Stade de l'Amitié, Libreville
Attendance: 38,250
Referee: Janny Sikazwe (Zambia)

== Statistics ==
=== Goalscorers ===
There were 66 goals scored in 32 matches, for an average of 2.06 goals per match.

3 goals

- (Democratic Republic of the Congo) Junior Kabananga

2 goals

- (Algeria) Riyad Mahrez
- (Algeria) Islam Slimani
- (Burkina Faso) Aristide Bancé
- (Burkina Faso) Préjuce Nakoulma
- (Cameroon) Michael Ngadeu-Ngadjui
- (Democratic Republic of the Congo) Paul-José M'Poku
- (Egypt) Mohamed Salah
- (Gabon) Pierre-Emerick Aubameyang
- (Ghana) André Ayew
- (Senegal) Sadio Mané
- (Tunisia) Naïm Sliti

1 goal

- (Algeria) Sofiane Hanni
- (Burkina Faso) Issoufou Dayo
- (Burkina Faso) Alain Traoré
- (Burkina Faso) Bertrand Traoré
- (Cameroon) Vincent Aboubakar
- (Cameroon) Christian Bassogog
- (Cameroon) Benjamin Moukandjo
- (Cameroon) Nicolas Nkoulou
- (Cameroon) Sébastien Siani
- (Democratic Republic of the Congo) Neeskens Kebano
- (Democratic Republic of the Congo) Firmin Ndombe Mubele
- (Egypt) Mohamed Elneny
- (Egypt) Kahraba
- (Egypt) Abdallah Said
- (Ghana) Jordan Ayew
- (Ghana) Asamoah Gyan
- (Guinea-Bissau) Piqueti
- (Guinea-Bissau) Juary Soares
- (Ivory Coast) Wilfried Bony
- (Ivory Coast) Serey Dié
- (Mali) Yves Bissouma
- (Morocco) Rachid Alioui
- (Morocco) Aziz Bouhaddouz
- (Morocco) Youssef En-Nesyri
- (Morocco) Romain Saïss
- (Senegal) Papakouli Diop
- (Senegal) Kara Mbodji
- (Senegal) Henri Saivet
- (Senegal) Moussa Sow
- (Togo) Mathieu Dossevi
- (Togo) Kodjo Fo-Doh Laba
- (Tunisia) Wahbi Khazri
- (Tunisia) Taha Yassine Khenissi
- (Tunisia) Youssef Msakni
- (Uganda) Farouk Miya
- (Zimbabwe) Kudakwashe Mahachi
- (Zimbabwe) Tendai Ndoro
- (Zimbabwe) Nyasha Mushekwi
- (Zimbabwe) Knowledge Musona

Own goals

- (Algeria) Aïssa Mandi (against Tunisia)
- (Guinea-Bissau) Rudinilson Silva (against Burkina Faso)

=== Discipline ===
A player was automatically suspended for the next match for the following offences:

- Receiving a red card (red card suspensions could be extended for serious offences)
- Receiving two yellow cards in two matches
- After the end of the group matches, all cautions received were cancelled for the rest of the competition. Nevertheless, a player having collected two yellow cards sustained the one match suspension.

The following suspensions occurred during the tournament:

Player(s)/Official(s)	Offence(s)	Suspension(s)
Group stage suspensions
(Democratic Republic of the Congo) Joyce Lomalisa	(yellow card) (yellow-red card) in Group C vs Morocco (matchday 1; 16 January 2017)	Group C vs Ivory Coast (matchday 2; 20 January 2017)
(Cameroon) Georges Mandjeck	(yellow card) in Group A vs Burkina Faso (matchday 1; 14 January 2017); (yellow card) in Group A vs Guinea-Bissau (matchday 2; 18 January 2017)	Group A vs Gabon (matchday 3; 22 January 2017)
Knockout stage suspensions
(Egypt) Kahraba	(yellow card) in Quarter-finals vs Morocco (29 January 2017); (yellow card) in Semi-finals vs Burkina Faso (1 February 2017)	Final vs Cameroon (5 February 2017)

=== Awards ===
The following awards were given at the conclusion of the tournament:

Total Man of the Competition

- (Cameroon) Christian Bassogog

Top Scorer

- (Democratic Republic of the Congo) Junior Kabananga (3 goals)

Fair Play prize

- Egypt

CAF Team of the tournament

Goalkeeper	Defenders	Midfielders	Forwards	Substitutes
(Cameroon) Fabrice Ondoa	(Senegal) Kara Mbodji (Egypt) Ahmed Hegazi (Cameroon) Michael Ngadeu-Ngadjui	(Burkina Faso) Charles Kaboré (Ghana) Mubarak Wakaso (Burkina Faso) Bertrand Traoré (Ghana) Christian Atsu (Egypt) Mohamed Salah	(Cameroon) Christian Bassogog (Democratic Republic of the Congo) Junior Kabananga	(Egypt) Essam El-Hadary (Senegal) Cheikhou Kouyaté (Burkina Faso) Préjuce Nakoulma (Burkina Faso) Aristide Bancé (Cameroon) Benjamin Moukandjo (Guinea-Bissau) Zezinho (Morocco) Mbark Boussoufa

=== Tournament rankings ===
Ranking criteria
For teams eliminated in the same knockout round, the following criteria are applied, in the order given, to determine the final rankings:
1. Goal difference in round eliminated;
2. Goals scored in round eliminated;
3. If teams eliminated in the semi-finals or quarter-finals are tied, the above criteria are reapplied for the previous knockout round, with this process repeated once more should two semi-finalists remain tied;
4. Points in group stage;
5. Goal difference in group stage;
6. Goals scored in group stage;
7. Disciplinary points.

For teams eliminated in the group stage, the following criteria are applied, in the order given, to determine the final rankings:

1. Position in group;
2. Points;
3. Goal difference;
4. Goals scored;
5. Disciplinary points.

Pos.	Team	G	Pld	W	D	L	Pts	GF	GA	GD
1	Cameroon	A	6	3	3	0	12	7	3	+4
2	Egypt	D	6	3	2	1	11	5	3	+2
3	Burkina Faso	A	6	3	3	0	12	8	3	+5
4	Ghana	D	6	3	0	3	9	4	5	−1
Eliminated in the quarter-finals
5	Senegal	B	4	2	2	0	8	6	2	+4
6	DR Congo	C	4	2	1	1	7	7	5	+2
7	Morocco	C	4	2	0	2	6	4	3	+1
8	Tunisia	B	4	2	0	2	6	6	7	−1
Eliminated in the group stage
9	Gabon	A	3	0	3	0	3	2	2	0
10	Algeria	B	3	0	2	1	2	5	6	−1
11	Ivory Coast	C	3	0	2	1	2	2	3	−1
12	Mali	D	3	0	2	1	2	1	2	−1
13	Uganda	D	3	0	1	2	1	1	3	−2
14	Guinea-Bissau	A	3	0	1	2	1	2	5	−3
15	Zimbabwe	B	3	0	1	2	1	4	8	−4
16	Togo	C	3	0	1	2	1	2	6	−4

== Sponsorship ==
In July 2016, Total secured an eight-year sponsorship package from the Confederation of African Football (CAF) to support ten of its principal competitions, including the Africa Cup of Nations (renamed the Total Africa Cup of Nations).

Title sponsor	Official sponsors
Total	Orange; beIN Sports

== Match ball ==
Mitre took over as the official match ball supplier following the expiration of the contract between Adidas and CAF. CAF Mitre Delta Hyperseam was the name of the official match ball.

== Mascot ==
The official mascot of the tournament was "Samba", a black panther.

== Controversy ==
=== Website attack ===
On 21 January, Russian hacking group New World Hackers claimed to have taken the official CAF website down in response to CAF's decision to choose Gabon as host nation. "We did this in protest against Gabon", the person claiming to be one of the hackers wrote in an email. "They are running the Africa Cup in a country where the dictator Ali Bongo is killing innocent people!"

== Media ==
=== Broadcasting ===
Territory	Channel	Ref
Asia-Pacific	BeIN Sports	
Australia	beIN Sports	
Bangladesh	Sony SIX; Sony ESPN	
Benin	ORTB	
Bhutan	Sony SIX; Sony ESPN	
Brazil	SporTV	
Canada	beIN Sports (English); Univision Canada (Spanish); RDS (French)	
Cape Verde	RTC	
Caribbean	Flow Sports	
Central America	ESPN	
Colombia	Caracol TV; RCN Television	
Democratic Republic of the Congo	RTNC	
(France) DOMTOM	France Télévisions	
Equatorial Guinea	RTVGE	
France	beIN Sports	
Gabon	GTV	
Ghana	GTV/KTV	
India	Sony SIX; Sony ESPN	
Ireland	Eurosport Ireland; RTÉ Sport	
Israel	Sport 5	
Italy	Fox Sports Italia	
Ivory Coast	RTI	
Cameroon	CRTV	
Japan	NHK	
Maldives	Sony SIX; Sony ESPN	
Mali	ORTM	
(Arab League) MENA	beIN Sports	
Mexico	Televisa; ESPN	
Nepal	Sony SIX; Sony ESPN	
Netherlands	Fox Sports Netherlands	
New Zealand	Sky Sport	
Pacific Islands	Sky Sport	
Pakistan	Sony SIX; Sony ESPN	
Portugal	Eurosport Portugal	
San Marino	Fox Sports Italia	
Senegal	RTS	
South Africa	SABC	
South America (except Brazil)	ESPN	
South Korea	JTBC3 Fox Sports	
Southeastern Europe	Arena Sport ^{1}	
Spain	Eurosport Spain	
Sri Lanka	Sony SIX; Sony ESPN	
Sub-Saharan Africa	SuperSport (English and Portuguese); TV5Monde Afrique (French); Canal+ Sport Afrique	
Togo	TVT international	
Turkey	Tivibu Spor	
United Kingdom	Eurosport	
United States	beIN Sports (English and Spanish)	
Vatican City	Fox Sports Italia	

^1 - Available in the following countries: Serbia, Croatia, Bosnia and Herzegovina, Montenegro and Macedonia
