= Yves Bissouma =

Mali international footballer (born 1996)

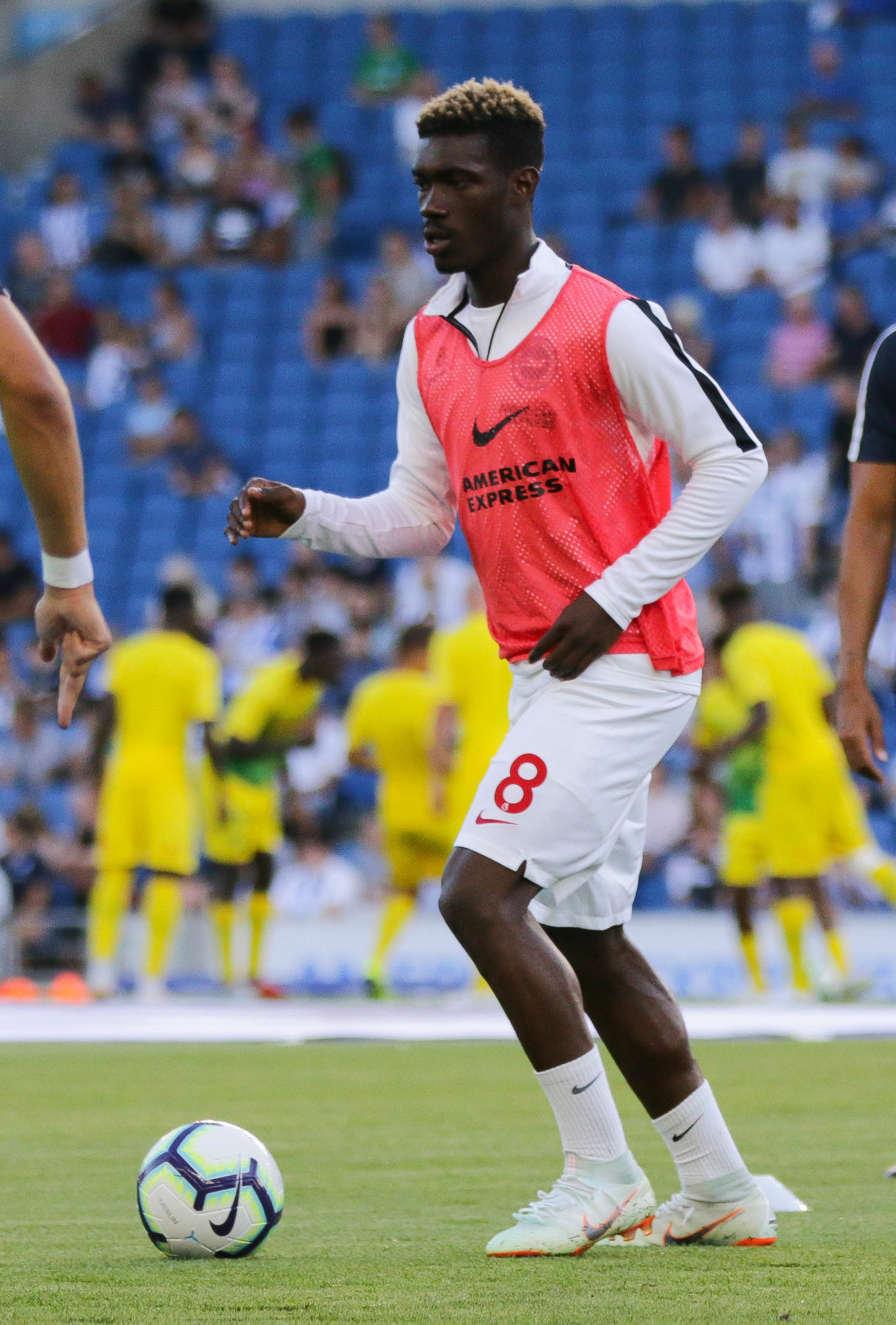
- Bissouma in 2018

Personal information
- Full name: Yves Bissouma
- Date of birth: 30 August 1996 (age 30)
- Place of birth: Issia, Ivory Coast
- Height: 1.82 m (6 ft 0 in)
- Position: Defensive midfielder

Team information
- Current team: Ajax
- Number: 28

Youth career
- 2009–2014: Majestic SC / JMG Academy Bamako

Senior career*
Years	Team	Apps	(Gls)
2014–2016	Real Bamako	24	(2)
2016–2017	Lille II	14	(3)
2016–2018	Lille	47	(3)
2018–2022	Brighton & Hove Albion	112	(3)
2022–2026	Tottenham Hotspur	90	(2)
2026–	Ajax	2	(0)

International career^{‡}
2015	Mali U23	3	(0)
2016–	Mali	50	(5)
- * Club domestic league appearances and goals as of 18:43, 25 October 2026 (UTC) ‡ National team caps and goals as of 18:46, 9 January 2026 (UTC)

Yves Bissouma (born 30 August 1996) is a professional footballer who plays as a defensive midfielder for Eredivisie club Ajax. Born in the Ivory Coast, he represents the Mali national team.

Having begun his senior career at Real Bamako, he signed his first professional contract at French Ligue 1 club Lille in 2016. Two years later he signed for Brighton & Hove Albion for an undisclosed fee. After four seasons as a Premier League regular, he transferred to Tottenham Hotspur for £30 million in 2022, where he won the UEFA Europa League in 2025.

Bissouma made his senior international debut for Mali in 2016, and was chosen for four Africa Cup of Nations tournaments. He was named in the CAF Team of the Year in 2024.

== Club career ==
=== Early career ===
Born in Issia, Ivory Coast, Bissouma trained at the prestigious Majestic SC academy in Abidjan, Ivory Coast, an academy partnered with JMG Academy in Bamako, Mali. At age 13, he was scouted to the academy in Mali, trained there for five years, where he played with future Mali international Adama Traoré. At age 18, he joined Real Bamako.

=== Lille ===
Bissouma caught the attention of French scouts in the African Nations Championship in February 2016. On 7 July 2016, four months after having arrived at Lille, he signed his first professional contract with the club, with a duration of three years. He made his Ligue 1 debut in the sixth fixture, a 2–1 home loss to Toulouse on 20 September, and scored his first goal the following 11 February in a game of the same result against Angers, though he was also sent off and suspended for two games. In March 2017, while on 13 games and one goal, his contract was extended to June 2021.

=== Brighton and Hove Albion ===
On 17 July 2018, Bissouma transferred to English side Brighton & Hove Albion for an undisclosed fee, signing a five-year contract with the club. He made his debut for the Sussex club on the opening day of the 2018–19 Premier League season in a 2–0 away loss to Watford where he came on as a substitute. He made his first start in Brighton's third match of the season, a single-goal defeat at Liverpool. On 5 January 2019, Bissouma scored his first Albion goal on his FA Cup debut in a 3–1 away win against south coast rivals Bournemouth in the third round.

He scored his first Premier League goal on the last day of the 2019–20 season with a long-range shot in a 2–1 away win against Burnley.

Bissouma was given a straight red card late on in Brighton's 3–0 away victory over Newcastle in their second league match of the 2020–21 season for catching Jamal Lewis in the face with his boot. He scored his first goal of the season in a 4–2 away defeat against Everton on 3 October. On 23 January 2021, in a fourth round FA Cup tie, Bissouma scored a 30-yard goal to put Brighton ahead in a 2–1 home win against Blackpool.

On 21 August, in Brighton's second match of the 2021–22 season he made his first Albion assist, to Neal Maupay in a 2–0 home victory over Watford. Bissouma scored his first goal of the season on 5 February 2022, putting Brighton one behind Tottenham in an eventual 3–1 away loss in the FA Cup fourth round. In April, he was suspended for Brighton's 3–0 away loss at Manchester City and 2–2 home drew against Southampton after picking up ten yellow cards. Returning from suspension, Bissouma scored a 20-yard effort finding the bottom corner, scoring Albion's third in a 3–0 away victory over Wolves taking Brighton's point tally to 44, breaking their record of 41 in the Premier League. A week later, Bissouma played the whole match of the 4–0 home win against Manchester United, which at the time was tied for Brighton's largest top-flight victory.

=== Tottenham Hotspur ===
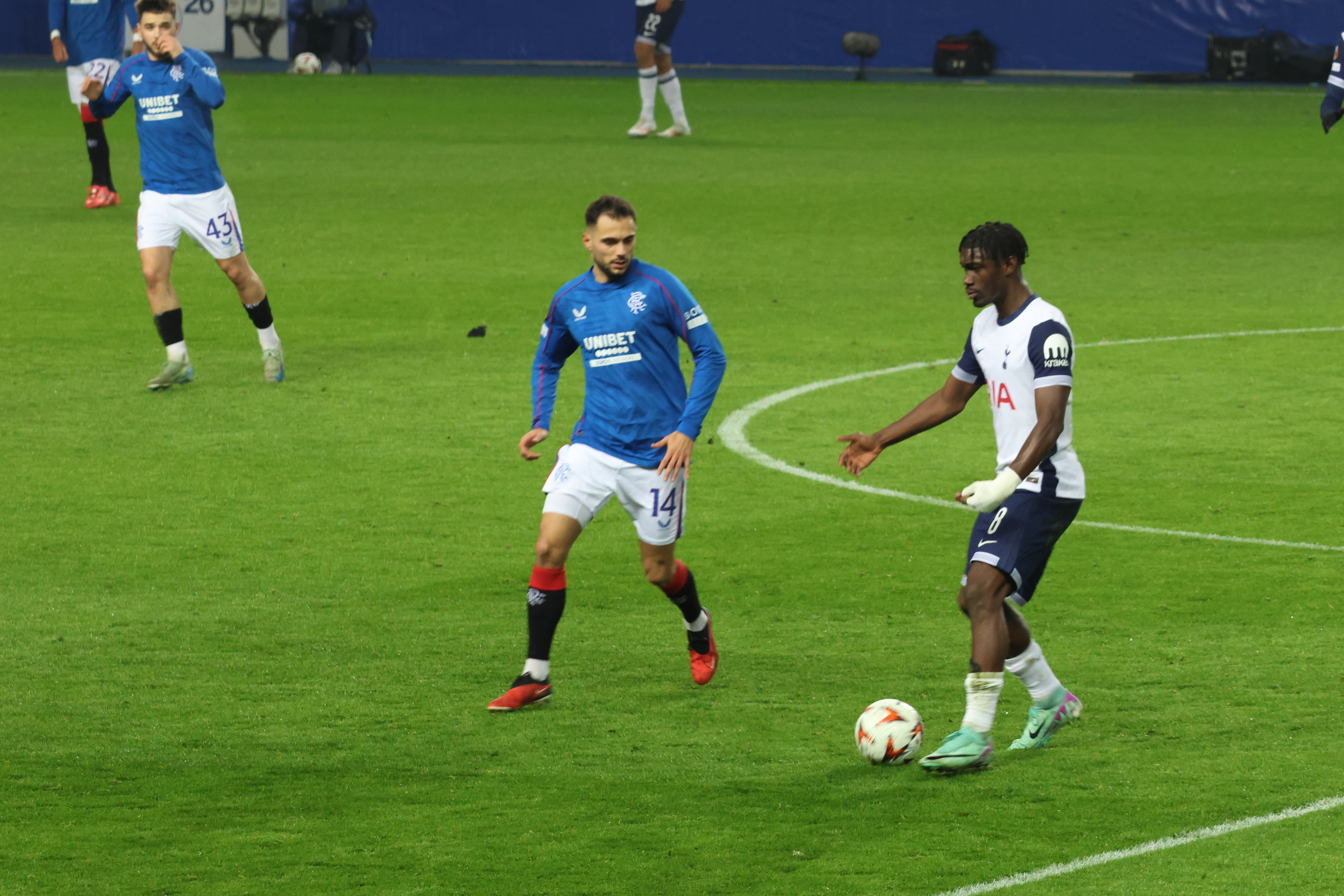
Bissouma on the ball against Rangers in December 2024

On 14 June 2022, Tottenham Hotspur agreed a £30m deal for Bissouma. Three days later, Tottenham confirmed the signing of Bissouma, with the Malian signing a four-year deal. On 6 August, Bissouma made his debut for the club, coming on as a second-half substitute in a 4–1 win over Southampton in the Premier League.

Bissouma started the 2023–24 season with two-consecutive Man of the Match performances in the first two matches, against Brentford and Manchester United.

On 24 August 2024, in his first appearance of the 2024–25 season, Bissouma scored his first competitive goal for Tottenham in a 4–0 home win over Everton. In a 4–0 away win against Manchester City on 23 November 2024, Bissouma was booked 14 seconds into the game after a foul on Phil Foden, which surpasses Sadio Mané's record in 2022 (15 seconds) of the quickest yellow card in the Premier League history.

On 12 August 2025, Tottenham manager Thomas Frank announced Bissouma had been left out of the squad to face Paris Saint-Germain in the European Super Cup due to persistent lateness. He left the club upon the expiration of his contract at the end of the 2025–26 season.

=== Ajax ===
On 16 September 2026, three months after having left Tottenham Hotspur, Bissouma signed a one-year contract with Eredivisie side Ajax.

== International career ==
Born in the Ivory Coast and moving to Mali aged 13 to pursue a professional football career, Bissouma participated at the 2016 African Nations Championship with Mali. In the semi-final against the Ivory Coast, he was brought on as a substitute in the 76th minute and scored the only goal of the game, in the 89th minute. They went on to lose in the final against DR Congo.

Bissouma was chosen for the 2017 Africa Cup of Nations in Gabon. He scored a direct free kick to equalise in a 1–1 draw with Uganda in the last group game, which was not enough to make the knockout rounds.

Bissouma was named in Mali's squad for the 2021 Africa Cup of Nations to be played in January 2022. He made an appearance in the first match on 13 January, coming on as a 59th-minute substitute, replacing Adama Traoré, in a controversial 1–0 victory over Tunisia, with the referee blowing for full-time early on two occasions. Bissouma played in all four of Mali's matches as they were knocked out via penalties against Equatorial Guinea in the round of 16 on 26 January.

On 11 December 2025, Bissouma was called up to the Mali squad for the 2025 Africa Cup of Nations.

== Personal life ==
Bissouma has been banned from driving in the United Kingdom on two occasions due to repeated speeding offences in 2019 and 2021. On 6 October 2021, Sussex Police arrested him on suspicion of sexually assaulting a woman. He was led out of The Arch, a nightclub in Brighton, in handcuffs. He was released on bail. On 29 June 2022, Bissouma was cleared of all allegations.

In June 2024, Bissouma was the victim of a robbery in front of the Hotel Majestic (Cannes) in the South of France. The footballer and his girlfriend had stopped in a car in front of their hotel when two hooded men came running up. Bissouma tried to take refuge inside the hotel, however, the attackers sprayed him with tear gas, before seizing his watch that was valued at €300,000.

In August 2024, Tottenham suspended Bissouma from the opening match of the next Premier League season. The reason was a video posted on Snapchat in which the footballer inhaled nitrous oxide, a Class C controlled drug under UK law, from a balloon.

== Career statistics ==
=== Club ===
As of match played 25 October 2026

Appearances and goals by club, season and competition
Club	Season	League			National cup (Note: Includes Coupe de France, FA Cup)		League cup (Note: Includes Coupe de la Ligue, EFL Cup)		Europe		Other		Total	
Club	Season	Division	Apps	Goals	Apps	Goals	Apps	Goals	Apps	Goals	Apps	Goals	Apps	Goals
Lille B	2016–17	National 2	14	3	—		—		—		—		14	3
Lille	2016–17	Ligue 1	23	1	3	0	0	0	1 (Note: Appearance(s) in UEFA Europa League)	0	—		27	1
Lille	2017–18	Ligue 1	24	2	2	1	2	0	—		—		28	3
Lille	Total		47	3	5	1	2	0	1	0	—		55	4
Brighton & Hove Albion	2018–19	Premier League	28	0	5	1	1	0	—		—		34	1
Brighton & Hove Albion	2019–20	Premier League	22	1	1	0	0	0	—		—		23	1
Brighton & Hove Albion	2020–21	Premier League	36	1	3	1	0	0	—		—		39	2
Brighton & Hove Albion	2021–22	Premier League	26	1	1	1	1	0	—		—		28	2
Brighton & Hove Albion	Total		112	3	10	3	2	0	—		—		124	6
Tottenham Hotspur	2022–23	Premier League	23	0	1	0	1	0	3 (Note: Appearances in UEFA Champions League)	0	—		28	0
Tottenham Hotspur	2023–24	Premier League	28	0	0	0	0	0	—		—		28	0
Tottenham Hotspur	2024–25	Premier League	28	2	2	0	4	0	10	0	—		44	2
Tottenham Hotspur	2025–26	Premier League	11	0	0	0	0	0	0	0	0	0	11	0
Tottenham Hotspur	Total		90	2	3	0	5	0	13	0	0	0	111	2
Ajax	2026–27	Eredivisie	2	0	0	0	—		0	0	—		2	0
Career total			265	11	18	4	9	0	14	0	0	0	296	15

=== International ===
As of match played 9 January 2026

Appearances and goals by national team and year
National team	Year	Apps	Goals
Mali	2015	1	0
Mali	2016	5	1
Mali	2017	9	2
Mali	2018	4	0
Mali	2019	0	0
Mali	2020	0	0
Mali	2021	0	0
Mali	2022	10	0
Mali	2023	2	0
Mali	2024	11	2
Mali	2025	6	0
Mali	2026	2	0
Total		50	5

Scores and results list Mali's goal tally first, score column indicates score after each Bissouma goal.

List of international goals scored by Yves Bissouma
No.	Date	Venue	Opponent	Score	Result	Competition
1	4 February 2016	Kigali Pelé Stadium, Kigali, Rwanda	Ivory Coast	1–0	1–0	2016 African Nations Championship
2	25 January 2017	Stade d'Oyem, Oyem, Gabon	Uganda	1–1	1–1	2017 Africa Cup of Nations
3	10 June 2017	Stade du 26 Mars, Bamako, Mali	Gabon	2–1	2–1	2019 Africa Cup of Nations qualification
4	6 September 2024	Stade du 26 Mars, Bamako, Mali	Mozambique	1–1	1–1	2025 Africa Cup of Nations qualification
5	10 September 2024	Mbombela Stadium, Mbombela, South Africa	Eswatini	1–0	1–0	2025 Africa Cup of Nations qualification

== Honours ==
Tottenham Hotspur

- UEFA Europa League: 2024–25

Mali

- African Nations Championship runner-up: 2016

Individual

- CAF Team of the Year: 2024
