= Denis Iguma =

Ugandan footballer (born 1994)

Personal information
- Date of birth: 10 February 1994 (age 32)
- Place of birth: Kalangala, Uganda
- Height: 1.80 m (5 ft 11 in)
- Position: Defender

Team information
- Current team: KCCA FC
- Number: 25

Senior career*
Years	Team	Apps	(Gls)
2013–2014	SC Victoria University		
2014–2018	Al-Ahed SC	25	(2)
2017–2020	Bekaa Club	20	(3)
2020–	KCCA FC	22	(3)

International career^{‡}
2012–	Uganda	63	(1)
- * Club domestic league appearances and goals as of 11 July 2021 ‡ National team caps and goals as of 11 July 2021

Denis Iguma is a Ugandan professional footballer who currently plays as a defender for KCCA FC and the Uganda national football team.

== Okuzannyira eggwanga ==
He made his debut for Uganda national football team on 29 March 2012 against Egypt national football team. In January 2014, coach Milutin Sedrojevic, invited him to be a part of the Uganda national football team for the 2014 African Nations Championship. The team placed third in the group stage of the competition after beating Burkina Faso, drawing with Zimbabwe and losing to Morocco. In 2017, he was included in the 23 man squad at the 2017 Africa Cup of Nations.

=== International goals ===
Scores and results list Uganda's goal tally first.

No	Date	Venue	Opponent	Score	Result	Competition
1.	13 July 2013	National Stadium, Dar-es-Salaam, Tanzania	Tanzania	1–0	1–0	2014 African Nations Championship qualification
