= Ali Lemghaifry =

Mauritanian football referee (born 1975)

Ali Lemghaifry (born 1975) is a Mauritanian football referee. He was born in Nouadhibou (Dakhlet NDB), the second biggest city in Mauritania. He has a degree in accounting.

Lemghaifry became a FIFA referee in 2005. He has officiated at the 2011 African Nations Championship and the 2014 FIFA World Cup qualifiers.
