= Hamada Nampiandraza =

Malagasy football referee

Hamada Nampiandraza (born 8 July 1984) is a Malagasy association football referee.

He was one of the referees for the 2015 Africa Cup of Nations, 2017 Africa Cup of Nations and the 2017 FIFA U-17 World Cup. He refereed the final of the 2017 Africa U-17 Cup of Nations in Gabon
