= Joyce Lomalisa =

Congolese footballer

Personal information
- Full name: Joyce Lomalisa Mutambala
- Date of birth: 18 June 1993 (age 33)
- Place of birth: Zaire
- Height: 1.75 m (5 ft 9 in)
- Position: Left back

Team information
- Current team: Sagrada Esperança

Senior career*
Years	Team	Apps	(Gls)
2013–2017	Vita Club	?	(?)
2017–2018	→ Mouscron (loan)	6	(?)
2018–2020	Interclube	18	(1)
2020–2022	Sagrada Esperança	9	(0)
2022–2024	Young Africans	17	(0)

International career^{‡}
2015–	DR Congo A'	11	(0)
2016–	DR Congo	23	(0)
- * Club domestic league appearances and goals as of 28 January 2018 ‡ National team caps and goals as of 28 January 2018

Joyce Lomalisa Mutambala (born 18 June 1993) is a Congolese professional footballer who plays as a defender for Girabola League club Sagrada Esperança.

== International career ==
Lomalisa made his first senior international appearance in a friendly in and against Zambia on 6 November 2015, in which he played the entire match.

== Honours ==
Vita Club

- Linafoot (1): 2015
- TANZANIA (YOUNG AFRICANS)
- nbc premier league×2
- Tanzania community shield ×1
- Tanzania fc cup ×2
- Caf confederation cup runner up medal 2023
