= Stade de Port-Gentil =

Stadium in Port-Gentil, Gabon

Coordinates: 0°48′19.3″S 8°48′13.7″E

- Interactive map of Stade de Port-Gentil
- Location: Port-Gentil, Gabon
- Owner: Government of Gabon
- Capacity: 20,000
- Field size: 105 x 68 m

Construction
- Groundbreaking: July 2015
- Architect: Shanghai General Construction
- General contractor: Shanghai General Construction

Tenant
- Gabon national football team (selected matches)

The Stade de Port-Gentil is a stadium in Port-Gentil, Gabon. This 20,000 capacity stadium opened in time for its use in the 2017 Africa Cup of Nations.
