= Oyem =

Oyem Nkoum Ekiègn
- Commune and provincial capital
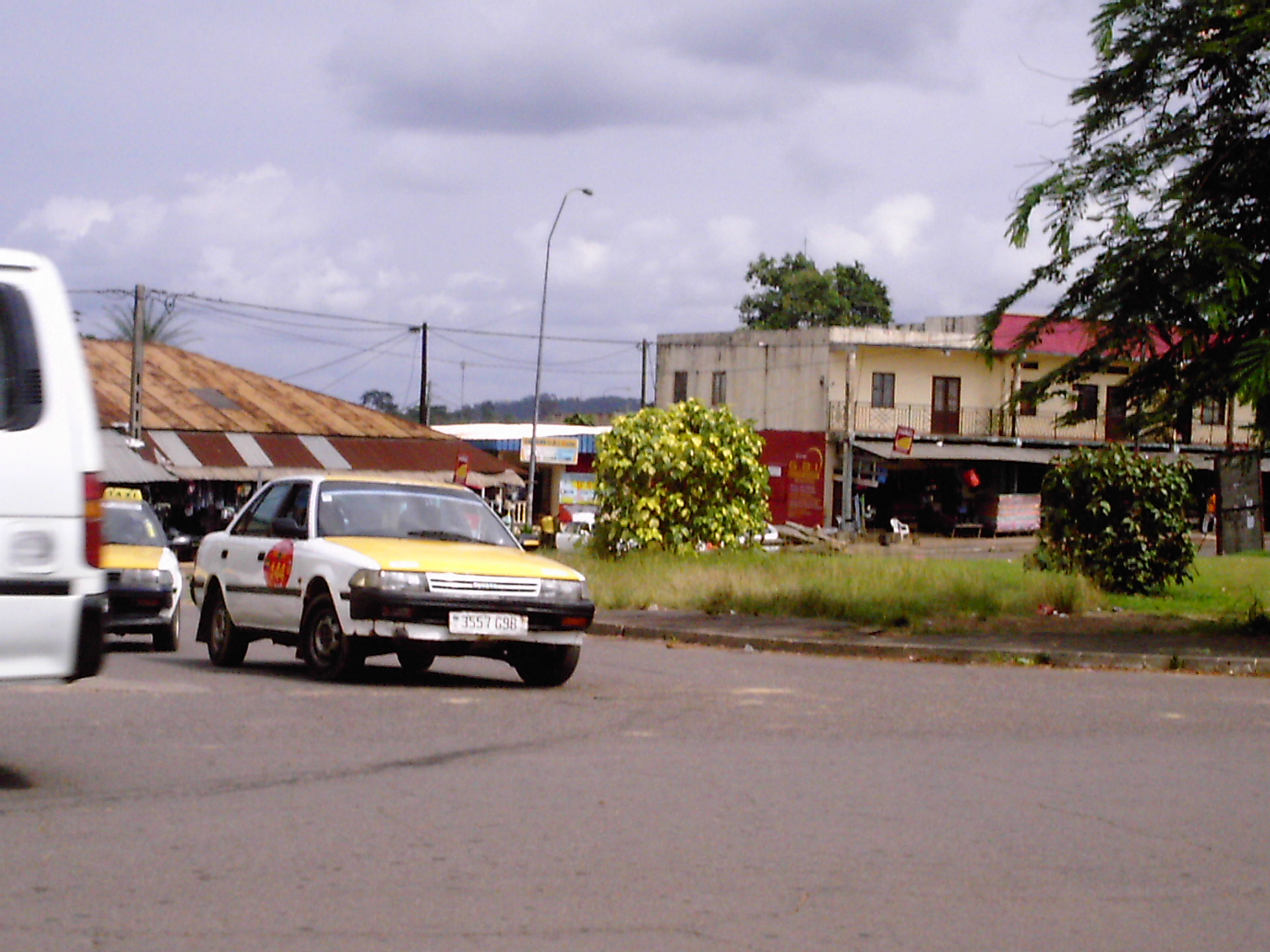

- Coat of arms

- Location in Gabon
- Coordinates: 1°35′58″N 11°34′46″E
- Country: Gabon
- Province: Woleu-Ntem
- Department: Woleu
- Founded as military post: 1904
- Erected as commune: 1962
- Elevation: 656 m (2,152 ft)

Population (2013)
  - Total: 60,685
- Time zone: UTC+1 (WAT)
- Climate: Am

Oyem, also known by the Fang name Nkoum Ekiègn, is a city in northern Gabon and the capital of Woleu-Ntem Province and of the Woleu Department. Situated on a plateau in the northern interior of the country, it lies on the N2 road that links Libreville to the Cameroonian border at Kyé-Ossi. With 60,685 inhabitants recorded at the 2013 general census, Oyem ranks as the fifth most populous urban commune in Gabon, after Libreville, Port-Gentil, Franceville and Owendo.

The town serves as the main administrative, commercial and religious hub of the Fang-speaking north of Gabon and is the seat of the Roman Catholic Diocese of Oyem. It was founded as a French colonial military post at the beginning of the twentieth century, transferred to the German Empire between 1911 and 1916 as part of Neukamerun, and retaken by French forces during the Kamerun campaign of the First World War. Since the late colonial period Oyem has been the agricultural capital of the Woleu-Ntem, producing the bulk of Gabonese cocoa and coffee, and has functioned as a cross-border logistics node with Cameroon and Equatorial Guinea.

== Etymology ==
The toponym Oyem is drawn from the Fang lexicon and is most commonly explained as the name of a large, hardwood tree that grew at the site of the original colonial post and beneath which community assemblies were traditionally held. In Fang philology the word belongs to the same root as the verb ayem ("to be strong, to harden, to solidify"), from which is also derived the noun denoting knowledge and the metallurgical sense of "to temper (metal)"; this polysemy has been used by local historians to argue that the city carries in its very name both a botanical and a metallurgical reference.

The alternative Fang name Nkoum Ekiègn (variously spelt Nkoume Ekiègne) is widely used locally. It is generally glossed as "Mount of the [ancestral] iron/metal" and is interpreted by Fang oral tradition as a reference both to the hill on which the old colonial district headquarters was built and to the Ekang people's metallurgical heritage.

== Geography ==
=== Location and topography ===
Oyem lies in the northern interior of Gabon, some 272 km north-east of Libreville in a straight line (about 373 km by road via the N1 and N2 highways), and roughly 110 km south of the Cameroonian border post of Kyé-Ossi. The town occupies a series of low hills, crests and small valleys on the southern edge of the South Cameroon Plateau, at an average elevation of approximately 650 m above sea level, although sources give altitudes ranging from 635 m to 910 m (3,000 ft) depending on the reference point within the commune.

According to Befene-Bibang's 1992 urban study, the commune covers more than 1,300 hectares and is subdivided into eighteen quartiers, of which the Centre-Ville forms the administrative, commercial and residential core, while the older quartiers populaires—grown out of pre-colonial Fang villages—retain a semi-rural character with generally precarious housing and deficient networks of water, electricity and telephone.

=== Hydrography ===
The urban perimeter is drained by a number of small streams that feed the Ntem and Woleu basins, after which the province is named. The Ntem, which rises on the plateau near Oyem and flows north-westward across Equatorial Guinea and southern Cameroon into the Atlantic Ocean near Campo, is one of the principal coastal rivers of Central Africa; geomorphological reconstructions of its longitudinal profile place its headwaters on the Oyem plateau at an altitude of roughly 650 m. The Woleu rises further west of the town and flows westward into Equatorial Guinea, where it is known as the Mbini or Benito River.

=== Climate ===
Oyem has a tropical monsoon climate (Köppen Am), typical of the equatorial interior of Gabon. Mean monthly temperatures fluctuate little over the year, with daytime maxima generally between 27 °C and 31 °C and night-time minima around 19–21 °C. Because Oyem lies near the Equator, the seasonal regime is characterised by two rainy seasons, a short wet season from March to May and a long wet season from September to November, separated by a shorter and relatively dry interlude in December–February and by the main dry season from June to August. Annual rainfall totals in the northern inland area are typically in the range of 1,700–2,000 mm, significantly less than on the Atlantic coast but accompanied by year-round high humidity and considerable cloud cover. The plateau elevation gives Oyem somewhat cooler nights and fresher air than coastal Libreville, a feature frequently remarked upon by nineteenth- and twentieth-century travellers.

== History ==
=== Pre-colonial period ===
The north of present-day Gabon was peopled in the second half of the nineteenth century by waves of Fang migrants belonging to the broader Beti-Pahuin cluster of northwestern Bantu-speaking agriculturalists. Coming from the plateaux of southern Adamawa in northern Cameroon and pushed southward by the jihads of Usman dan Fodio and by Vute and Fulbe raids, the Fang and their Bulu and Ntumu cousins moved down the Dja River valley and into the equatorial forest, reaching the sources of the Ntem and Woleu in the course of the nineteenth century.

Oral traditions collected in the canton Nyè record that by the 1840s the site of modern Oyem was occupied by villages of the Nkodjeign and Essangui clans, whose head-villages (Mendoung/Akwakam, Adjougou, Keng-Akoa and others) were founded by the sons of the ancestor Ndong Owono. A large, free-standing oyem tree stood at the current site of the old district-commissioner's residence and served as a meeting-point for palavers.

Because of their remoteness from the Atlantic coast, the Fang of the Woleu-Ntem retained virtually no direct contact with Europeans until the closing decades of the nineteenth century, and, unlike the coastal Mpongwe and Orungu, did not participate in the Atlantic slave trade as middlemen.

=== French penetration and foundation, 1895–1911 ===
According to local tradition, a French militiaman sent into the Oyem district around 1895 was captured by Essangui warriors of the village of Obout and handed over to the chief of the canton, Eyi Nkoa; this incident obliged the French to redirect their penetration through the adjoining Meboum and Nkodjeign lands. A French military post was established on the site by Captain Weber in 1904 (some local sources give 1903), as part of the new military region of the Woleu-Ntem which was officially constituted in 1907.

Weber, as the first French administrator of the region, founded the posts of Oyem, Bitam and Minvoul with the aim of securing an effective French presence in the interior. French colonisation of the northern Fang country met substantial resistance, notably from the Binzima (Bəyzima or Bizima) brotherhood, a Fang initiatory association variously described as a cult of resistance or as a movement of raiders, which is estimated to have mobilised up to a hundred thousand men between 1907 and 1910. Its leaders, Oyone Mintsa of the Nkodjeign clan and Ekome Adza of the Odzip clan, directed attacks on pro-French villages and submitted recalcitrant communities to initiation; they are documented in the archives of the Service Historique of the Troupes de Marine.

=== Neukamerun and the First World War (1911–1916) ===
By the Treaty of Fez of 4 November 1911, which resolved the Agadir Crisis, France ceded to the German Empire a wedge of some 275,000 km² taken from French Equatorial Africa, known in German as Neukamerun ("New Cameroon"), in exchange for German recognition of the French protectorate over Morocco. The northern part of the future Woleu-Ntem, including Oyem, Bitam, Minvoul and Mitzic, was thereby detached from the French colony of Gabon and incorporated into the enlarged German Kamerun.

The German administration made only limited investments in Oyem before the outbreak of the First World War. When the Kamerun campaign opened in August 1914, Allied (French, Belgian and British) forces invaded Kamerun from all sides, with a southern front operating out of Gabon through the Oyem–Akoafim sector. By the time the last German garrison surrendered at Mora in February 1916, the whole of Neukamerun had been overrun by Allied troops. France reoccupied the ceded territories and the pre-1911 boundary was restored, so that Oyem returned to French jurisdiction as part of the colony of Gabon within French Equatorial Africa.

=== Late colonial period ===
Under the restored French administration, Oyem consolidated its function as a district headquarters (chef-lieu de district) and later as the administrative centre of the Woleu-Ntem region. The town and its hinterland became the focus of the colony's experiment in peasant cash-crop farming, with cocoa, first introduced by German planters around 1896, and coffee supplied by family holdings rather than by concessionary companies, a pattern that distinguished the Fang north from the rest of Gabon.

Oyem also lay at the heart of the religious and political ferment of the late colonial Fang world, which the American anthropologist James W. Fernandez documented in an extended ethnographic study of the "Oyem District" villages, most notably Assok Ening. Fernandez's Bwiti: An Ethnography of the Religious Imagination in Africa (1982) remains the standard reference on Fang culture and on the syncretic Bwiti religion as it developed in the north after 1920. Historians have shown how the anti-sorcery movement around the ritual specialist Emane Boncoeur, which reached Oyem in the mid-1950s, interacted with the political competition between Jean-Hilaire Aubame and the future first president Léon M'ba, underlining Oyem's importance in the wider pre-independence politics of the Fang country.

=== Independence and contemporary period ===
Gabon gained full independence from France on 17 August 1960. Oyem was formally erected as a commune in 1962, a status that gave the city a full municipal council and a directly elected mayor. On 29 May 1969 Pope Paul VI detached the northern part of the Archdiocese of Libreville to create the Roman Catholic Diocese of Oyem, with the Cathédrale Saint-Charles-Lwanga (consecrated in 1967) as its episcopal see. The diocese, reduced in 2003 by the transfer of territory to the new Apostolic Prefecture of Makokou, is coextensive with the Woleu-Ntem province; at the end of 2022 it counted 176,630 Catholics (about 98 per cent of a total population of 179,740).

In December 2004 Oyem was the starting point of a major outbreak of typhoid fever that spread through northern Gabon and reached the capital in early 2005; the epidemic was attributed by the Gabonese Ministry of Health to failing water supplies in the town, where more than 100 cases were eventually confirmed nationally.

Infrastructure in the city was comprehensively renewed in preparation for the 2017 Africa Cup of Nations, for which Oyem was designated a host city. A new international-standard football stadium, the Stade d'Oyem, was built by Chinese contractors in the satellite village of Ewormekok, 15–17 km north of the city, and several roads and hotels were upgraded.

Following the military coup of 30 August 2023 that ended the 56-year rule of the Bongo family, Oyem became one of the centres of the public-investment programme announced by transitional leader and, after the presidential election of 12 April 2025, elected president Brice Oligui Nguema, whose victory was confirmed by the Constitutional Court on 25 April 2025 and who was sworn in on 3 May 2025. In 2025 the Agence Française de Développement and the Gabonese government launched the construction of a new Centre Hospitalier Universitaire (CHU) d'Oyem, intended to serve the populations of northern Gabon and the adjoining cross-border areas of Cameroon and Equatorial Guinea.

== Administration ==
Oyem is simultaneously the capital of Woleu-Ntem Province, one of the nine provinces of Gabon, and the chef-lieu of the Woleu Department, one of the province's five departments (Woleu, Ntem, Okano, Haut-Ntem and Haut-Komo). Local government is exercised by the Commune d'Oyem, which since the territorial reforms of the 1970s has been divided into two Arrondissements; each arrondissement has its own town hall (mairie d'arrondissement) subordinate to the central Mairie d'Oyem.

Following the 2023 coup the municipal council was replaced by a Délégation Spéciale (special delegation) chaired by Jean-Christophe Owono Nguema. In November 2025 a newly elected communal council chose Chen Sylvestre Mezui M'Obiang as mayor of Oyem, the first elected mayor of the city under the new republican institutions.

== Demographics ==
The population of Oyem grew from some 18,000 inhabitants at the end of the 1980s, recorded in Befene-Bibang's 1992 urban survey, to 22,404 at the 1993 national census, 34,000 in 2005 (unofficial estimate) and 60,685 at the 2013 census. The 2013 figure placed Oyem fifth among Gabonese urban communes, below Libreville, Port-Gentil, Franceville and Owendo (the expanding industrial port commune south of Libreville) and ahead of Lambaréné, Moanda and Tchibanga. The detailed commune-level results of the delayed 2023–2026 RGPL had not been fully published yet.

The population is overwhelmingly Fang-speaking and belongs mainly to the Ntumu and Okak sub-groups of the Fang cluster; the same cross-border Fang family straddles the neighbouring districts of Equatorial Guinea and southern Cameroon. A minority of non-Fang Gabonese, Lebanese and Hausa traders, and small communities of migrants from other African countries also live in the town, particularly in the commercial quarters of the Centre-Ville.

== Economy ==
=== Agriculture ===
Oyem is the commercial and service centre for what administrators and geographers have long called "the agricultural capital of the north". The fertile, well-drained soils of the Woleu-Ntem plateau made it the main zone of peasant cocoa and coffee cultivation in Gabon from the 1910s onward, a specialisation that the Fang of the north adopted when cash crops were introduced by German and French administrators. Cocoa and coffee produced on mixed plantations around Oyem are traditionally trucked north-westwards to the Cameroonian ports of Kribi and Douala for export, rather than through Libreville. Subsistence crops include cassava, plantain, taro and yam, complemented by bushmeat hunting, while rubber and potatoes are also grown commercially.

The Société d'Investissement pour l'Agriculture Tropicale (SIAT), a Belgian agro-industrial group, in 2004 took over the former Gabonese state plantations around Oyem, Bitam, Mitzic, Minvoul and Kango, and has since revived rubber and palm-oil production in the area. Under the post-2023 "Gabon émergent" successor policies, the government has also launched the Projet agricole d'Oyem, aimed at supporting family cocoa and market-gardening enterprises in the province.

=== Trade and services ===
Because of its proximity to the Cameroonian and Equatoguinean borders, only 110 km from Kyé-Ossi and Ebebiyín, Oyem has historically functioned as a logistical and commercial hub for the CEMAC sub-region. The opening of the trans-boundary bridge at Eboro over the Ntem in 2005 replaced the previous ferry crossing and made Oyem a key stopover on the bitumen road linking Libreville to Yaoundé via Bitam, Kyé-Ossi, Ambam and Ebolowa. The Marché d'Oyem is the principal food and consumer-goods market of the province, while service and retail activity is concentrated in the Centre-Ville and along the N2 axis.

Manufacturing activity remains modest, and Befene-Bibang's 1992 study described small-scale industry, commerce and transport in Oyem as "faiblement développés et mal organisés", a situation that later economic assessments by the Ministry of the Economy and the Oxford Business Group indicate has only partially improved.

== Transport ==
=== Roads ===
Oyem is the principal urban node on the N2 (Route Nationale 2), the paved two-way highway that runs north-eastward from Libreville through Ndjolé, Mitzic and Oyem to Bitam and the Cameroonian border. The N2 is part of the CEMAC corridor linking Gabon to Cameroon and Equatorial Guinea. A secondary paved road branches west from Oyem toward Médouneu and the Equatoguinean frontier. By road, Oyem is about 373 km from Libreville and approximately 849 km from Bitam via the full Libreville–Bifoum–Ndjolé–Mitzic–Oyem itinerary.

=== Air transport ===
Oyem Airport, situated about 4 km south of the city, handles the limited domestic air traffic of northern Gabon. It has a single asphalted runway (03/21) and is currently served by the Gabonese regional carrier Afrijet, which operates scheduled flights to Libreville; a former route to Port-Gentil was last flown in October 2024. Gabon's central railway line, the Transgabonais, does not extend to the north of the country, so Oyem is not served by rail.

== Culture and religion ==
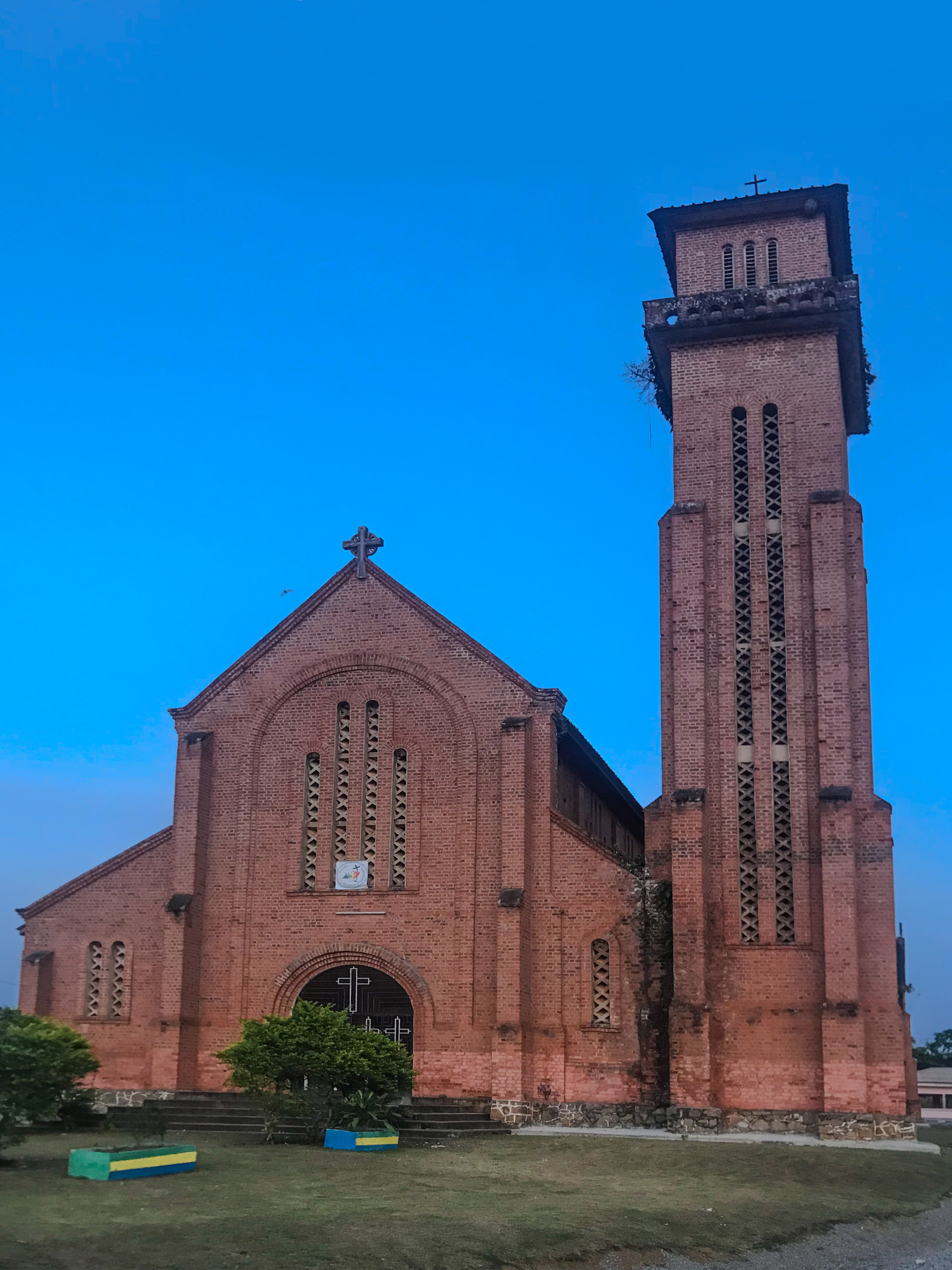
Catholic Church of Saint Thérèse of the Child Jesus of Angone

=== Fang culture ===
Oyem is widely regarded as a major centre of contemporary Fang culture in Gabon. The Mvet, the eight-stringed harp-zither played by specialist bards, underpins the great Fang oral-epic tradition (such as the cycle of the Engong), of which the Woleu-Ntem is one of the last strongholds. The Oyem-district villages of Assok Ening and the lineage of Mvok Mba M'Oye served as Fernandez's principal field site, the ethnographic framing of which is set out in the opening chapters of Bwiti (pp. 14–16).

Pre-Christian Fang religion revolved around the ancestor cult of the bieri—carved wooden reliquary figures that guarded the skulls and long bones of lineage ancestors—and around the judicial and anti-sorcery association of the ngi (or ngil), which Fernandez treats in the chapters "The Antiwitchcraft Cult and Its Evolution" (pp. 221 ff.) and "The Apotheosis of Evil" (pp. 227 ff.). The decline of these cults under colonial pressure opened the way for the syncretic religion of Bwiti, which combines ancestor veneration with Christian symbolism and the ritual consumption of the psychoactive root bark of Tabernanthe iboga; Fang Bwiti is especially well-documented in the Oyem and Médouneu districts, and the anti-sorcery movement known as Ndéndé reached Oyem in late 1957.

=== Christianity ===
The city is the seat of the Roman Catholic Diocese of Oyem (Dioecesis Oyemensis), a suffragan see of the Metropolitan Archdiocese of Libreville. The diocese was established on 29 May 1969 and its cathedral, the Cathédrale Saint-Charles-Lwanga, was dedicated to the Ugandan martyr Charles Lwanga in 1967. Since 2000 it has been governed by Bishop Jean-Vincent Ondo Eyene. Protestant communities, notably the Christian and Missionary Alliance and independent evangelical churches inherited from the Paris Mission Society, are also well established in the town.

=== Judaism ===
Oyem is home to one of the two small self-identified Jewish communities of northern Gabon (the other is in the neighbouring town of Bitam). Founded in the 1990s by the former evangelical preacher Pascal Meka Ngomo, who adopted Judaism on the basis of a personal revelation, the group observes the Saturday Shabbat and the main Jewish dietary rules, though it has no synagogue of its own. Oyem's Jews maintain contacts with the Beth Yeshourun community of Sa'a in Cameroon and with the American organisation Kulanu, which has run educational visits since the late 2000s.

== Education ==
Oyem has long hosted the most important secondary schools of northern Gabon. These include the Lycée Léon M'ba d'Oyem, several collèges and the Alarmintang Protestant Secondary School, named after the post-war Fang politician Marc Essia-Nsomore, whose career as a teacher and deputy linked the town to the earliest parliamentary representation of the Woleu-Ntem. The city also hosts a government agricultural school attached to the regional services of the Ministry of Agriculture. At tertiary level, the official inventory of the Ministère de l'Enseignement Supérieur includes Oyem among the sites of the public higher-education network, though the principal national universities, Omar Bongo University in Libreville and the Université des Sciences et Techniques de Masuku in Franceville, are based elsewhere.

== Healthcare ==
The principal public health facility in Oyem is the Centre Hospitalier Régional d'Oyem (CHRO), popularly known as the hôpital canadien because of its initial partnership with the Canadian NGO Santé Internationale; three successive phases of Canadian technical assistance ran from the early 2000s until 2012 to support the development of the hospital as a regional model. Gabonese and regional media have nonetheless repeatedly reported on chronic problems of supply and infrastructure at the hospital during the 2010s, including drug shortages and recurrent breakdowns of water and electricity.

In response, a rehabilitation contract for the CHRO was awarded in December 2020 under the national public-procurement system, and in 2025 the construction of a new Centre Hospitalier Universitaire (teaching hospital) adjacent to the CHRO was launched, financed by the Agence Française de Développement as part of the Oligui Ville urban-development scheme for the northern capital.

== Sports ==
The Stade d'Oyem is a multi-purpose stadium built in the village of Ewormekok, 15–17 km north of the city along the N2. Commissioned from Chinese contractors in September 2015 at an estimated cost of XAF 36.3 billion (about US $60 million) and inaugurated in early 2017, it has a single-tier roofed stand and a nominal capacity of 20,031 (generally rounded to 20,000) spectators. It was one of the four venues of the 2017 Africa Cup of Nations, alongside the Stade de l'Amitié in Libreville, the Stade de Franceville and the Stade de Port-Gentil, and hosted Group C matches during the tournament.

== International relations ==
=== Twin towns – sister cities ===
Oyem is twinned with:

- Clermont-Ferrand, France

== Notable people ==
- Daniel Ona Ondo - Gabonese prime minister
- Guélor Kanga - Gabonese football player

== See also ==
- Oyem Solar Power Station
