= Stade d'Oyem =

Stadium in Oyem, Gabon

Coordinates: 1°42′23.76″N 11°38′42.36″E

Stade of Oyem
- Interactive map of Stade of Oyem
- Location: Oyem, Gabon
- Owner: Government of Gabon
- Capacity: 20,500
- Surface: GrassMaster
- Field size: 105 x 68 m

Construction
- Groundbreaking: 2015
- Renovated: 2020–24
- Architect: Shanghai General Construction
- General contractor: Shanghai General Construction

Tenant
- Gabon national football team (selected matches)

The Stade d'Oyem is a stadium in Oyem, Gabon. This 20,500 capacity stadium opened for use in the 2017 Africa Cup of Nations.
