= 2017 Africa Cup of Nations qualification =

Tournament details
- Dates: 12 June 2015 – 4 September 2016
- Teams: 51 (from 1 confederation)

Tournament statistics
- Matches played: 144
- Goals scored: 363 (2.52 per match)
- Top scorer(s): (Algeria) Hillal Soudani (7 goals)

The 2017 Africa Cup of Nations qualification matches were organized by the Confederation of African Football (CAF) to decide the participating teams of the 2017 Africa Cup of Nations, the 31st edition of the international men's football championship of Africa. A total of 16 teams qualified to play in the final tournament, including Gabon who qualified automatically as hosts.

== Draw ==
A total of 52 teams entered the tournament, including the hosts (Gabon) which qualified automatically for the final tournament. The draw for the qualification stage took place on 8 April 2015, immediately after the announcement of the host nation, originally scheduled at 12:30 UTC+2 at the Marriott ‘Zamalek’ Hotel in Cairo, Egypt, but delayed to 15:00. The host nation team (Gabon) was also drawn into a group and played games against teams in that group; however, these matches were only considered as friendlies and not counted for the standings.

Due to the cancellation of Morocco being hosts of the 2015 edition, the national team of Morocco were originally banned by the Confederation of African Football (CAF) to enter the 2017 and 2019 Africa Cups of Nations. However, the ban was overturned by the Court of Arbitration for Sport, allowing Morocco to enter the tournament.

Morocco had sought to postpone the tournament because of the outbreak of Ebola in Africa but their request was rejected by CAF.

=== Seeding ===
For seeding, the teams were ranked using CAF's own system which were calculated based on the team's performance in the 2014 FIFA World Cup qualifying tournament, the three most recent editions the Africa Cup of Nations, and their qualifying campaigns.

Pot	Rank	Team	Tournaments and weighting factor							Total
Pot	Rank	Team	2015 AFCON	2015 AFCON Q.	2013 AFCON	2013 AFCON Q.	2012 AFCON	2012 AFCON Q.	2014 FIFA WC Q.	Total
Pot	Rank	Team	× 3	× 2	× 2	× 1	× 1	× 0.5	× 1	Total
Pot 1	1	Ivory Coast	24	8	6	3	6	2	7	56
Pot 1	2	Ghana	18	10	8	3	4	2	7	52
Pot 1	3	Tunisia	9	10	4	3	3	1.5	5	35.5
Pot 1	4	Burkina Faso	3	8	12	3	1	2	5	34
Pot 1	5	Mali	6	8	8	3	4	2	3	34
Pot 1	6	Nigeria		6	16	3		1.5	7	33.5
Pot 1	7	Algeria	9	10	2	3		1	7	32
Pot 1	8	Zambia	3	8	4	3	8	2	3	31
Pot 1	9	Cape Verde	6	10	6	3		1.5	3	29.5
Pot 1	10	DR Congo	12	6	4	3		1	2	28
Pot 1	11	Guinea	9	8		2	2	2	3	26
Pot 1	12	Senegal	6	8		2	1	2	5	24
Pot 1	13	Cameroon	3	10		2		1.5	7	23.5
Pot 2	14	South Africa	3	10	6			1.5	3	23.5
Pot X	15	Gabon (Host)	6	10		2	3		2	23
Pot 2	16	Congo	9	8		1		1	3	22
Pot 2	17	Equatorial Guinea	12	1		2	3		1	19
Pot 2	18	Angola		6	2	3	2	2	2	17
Pot 2	19	Ethiopia		4	2	3		1	5	15
Pot 2	20	Togo		4	6	3		0.5	1	14.5
Pot 2	21	Morocco			4	3	2	2	3	14
Pot 2	22	Niger		4	2	3	1	2	1	13
Pot 2	23	Egypt		6		1		0.5	5	12.5
Pot 2	24	Uganda		6		2		1.5	3	12.5
Pot 2	25	Malawi		6		2		1	3	12
Pot 2	26	Sudan		4		2	3	1.5	1	11.5
Pot 2	27	Mozambique		6		2		1	2	11
Pot 3	28	Botswana		4		2	1	2	2	11
Pot 3	29	Libya		1		2	2	1.5	3	9.5
Pot 3	30	Sierra Leone		4		2		1	2	9
Pot 3	31	Lesotho		4					2	6
Pot 3	32	Kenya		2		1		1	2	6
Pot 3	33	Benin		2		1		0.5	2	5.5
Pot 3	34	Rwanda		2		1		1.5	1	5.5
Pot 3	35	Tanzania		2		1		0.5	2	5.5
Pot 3	36	Central African Republic		1		2		1.5	1	5.5
Pot 3	37	Zimbabwe		1		2		1	1	5
Pot 3	38	Liberia		1		2		0.5	1	4.5
Pot 3	39	Gambia		1		1		1.5	1	4.5
Pot 3	40	Namibia		1		1		1	1	4
Pot 4	41	Guinea-Bissau		2		1		0.5		3.5
Pot 4	42	Seychelles		2		1				3
Pot 4	43	Burundi		1		1		1		3
Pot 4	44	Mauritania		2				0.5		2.5
Pot 4	45	Chad		1		1		0.5		2.5
Pot 4	45	Madagascar		1		1		0.5		2.5
Pot 4	47	São Tomé and Príncipe		1		1				2
Pot 4	48	Comoros		1				0.5		1.5
Pot 4	48	Swaziland		1				0.5		1.5
Pot 4	50	South Sudan		1						1
Pot 4	51	Mauritius						0.5		0.5
Pot 4	52	Djibouti								0

Non-participants

- Eritrea
- Somalia

=== Procedure ===
The draw procedure is as follows:

- The hosts are placed in its own Pot X. A drawing of lots determines which group the hosts are "drawn" to play friendlies against (meaning this group in effect only has three teams).
- The 13 teams in Pot 1 are drawn, with each group containing one team.
- The 13 teams in Pot 2 are drawn, with each group containing one team.
- The 13 teams in Pot 3 are drawn, with each group containing one team.
- The 12 teams in Pot 4 are drawn, with each group, except the one with only three teams (where the host had already been "drawn" into), containing one team.

== Format ==
There were thirteen groups, twelve with four teams and one with three teams (plus the host nation which played friendlies with the three teams). The group winners and two best overall runners-up qualified for the tournament. When determining the best runners-up, the group of the host nation (where only matches between three teams were counted for the standings) was not considered, as well as any group where only three teams were left due to withdrawal of one team.

=== Tiebreakers ===
The teams were ranked according to points (3 points for a win, 1 point for a draw, 0 points for a loss). If tied on points, tiebreakers were applied in the following order:

1. Number of points obtained in games between the teams concerned;
2. Goal difference in games between the teams concerned;
3. Goals scored in games between the teams concerned;
4. Away goals scored in games between the teams concerned;
5. If, after applying criteria 1 to 4 to several teams, two teams still have an equal ranking, criteria 1 to 4 are reapplied exclusively to the matches between the two teams in question to determine their final rankings. If this procedure does not lead to a decision, criteria 6 to 9 apply;
6. Goal difference in all games;
7. Goals scored in all games;
8. Away goals scored in all games;
9. Drawing of lots.

== Schedule ==
The qualifiers started with the first matches played in the FIFA international dates of 8–16 June 2015.

Matchday	Date
Matchday 1	12–14 June 2015
Matchday 2	4–6 September 2015
Matchday 3	23–26 March 2016
Matchday 4	27–29 March 2016
Matchday 5	3–5 June 2016
Matchday 6	2–4 September 2016

== Groups ==
The thirteen group winners and the two best runners-up qualified for the final tournament.

=== Group A ===
Pos	Team	Pld	W	D	L	GF	GA	GD	Pts	Qualification	Tunisia	Togo	Liberia	Djibouti
1	Tunisia	6	4	1	1	16	3	+13	13	Final tournament	—	1–0	4–1	8–1
2	Togo	6	3	2	1	11	4	+7	11	Final tournament	0–0	—	2–1	5–0
3	Liberia	6	3	1	2	11	8	+3	10		1–0	2–2	—	5–0
4	Djibouti	6	0	0	6	1	24	−23	0		0–3	0–2	0–1	—

Source: CAF

=== Group B ===
Pos	Team	Pld	W	D	L	GF	GA	GD	Pts	Qualification	Democratic Republic of the Congo	Central African Republic	Angola	Madagascar
1	DR Congo	6	5	0	1	16	6	+10	15	Final tournament	—	4–1	2–1	2–1
2	Central African Republic	6	3	1	2	9	11	−2	10		2–0	—	3–1	2–1
3	Angola	6	1	2	3	7	8	−1	5		0–2	4–0	—	1–1
4	Madagascar	6	0	3	3	5	12	−7	3		1–6	1–1	0–0	—

Source: CAF

=== Group C ===
Pos	Team	Pld	W	D	L	GF	GA	GD	Pts	Qualification	Mali	Benin	Equatorial Guinea	South Sudan
1	Mali	6	5	1	0	13	3	+10	16	Final tournament	—	5–2	1–0	2–0
2	Benin	6	3	2	1	12	10	+2	11		1–1	—	2–1	4–1
3	Equatorial Guinea	6	1	1	4	6	6	0	4		0–1	1–1	—	4–0
4	South Sudan	6	1	0	5	3	15	−12	3		0–3	1–2	1–0	—

Source: CAF

=== Group D ===
Pos	Team	Pld	W	D	L	GF	GA	GD	Pts	Qualification	Burkina Faso	Uganda	Botswana	Comoros
1	Burkina Faso	6	4	1	1	6	2	+4	13	Final tournament	—	1–0	2–1	2–0
2	Uganda	6	4	1	1	6	2	+4	13	Final tournament	0–0	—	2–0	1–0
3	Botswana	6	2	0	4	5	8	−3	6		1–0	1–2	—	2–1
4	Comoros	6	1	0	5	2	7	−5	3		0–1	0–1	1–0	—

Source: CAF

=== Group E ===
Pos	Team	Pld	W	D	L	GF	GA	GD	Pts	Qualification	Guinea-Bissau	Republic of the Congo	Zambia	Kenya
1	Guinea-Bissau	6	3	1	2	7	7	0	10	Final tournament	—	2–4	3–2	1–0
2	Congo	6	2	3	1	9	7	+2	9		1–0	—	1–1	1–1
3	Zambia	6	1	4	1	7	7	0	7		0–0	1–1	—	1–1
4	Kenya	6	1	2	3	5	7	−2	5		0–1	2–1	1–2	—

Source: CAF

=== Group F ===
Pos	Team	Pld	W	D	L	GF	GA	GD	Pts	Qualification	Morocco	Cape Verde	Libya	São Tomé and Príncipe
1	Morocco	6	5	1	0	10	1	+9	16	Final tournament	—	2–0	1–0	2–0
2	Cape Verde	6	3	0	3	11	7	+4	9		0–1	—	0–1	7–1
3	Libya	6	2	1	3	8	6	+2	7		1–1	1–2	—	4–0
4	São Tomé and Príncipe	6	1	0	5	4	19	−15	3		0–3	1–2	2–1	—

Source: CAF

=== Group G ===
Pos	Team	Pld	W	D	L	GF	GA	GD	Pts	Qualification	Egypt	Nigeria	Tanzania	Chad
1	Egypt	4	3	1	0	7	1	+6	10	Final tournament	—	1–0	3–0	Canc.
2	Nigeria	4	1	2	1	2	2	0	5		1–1	—	1–0	~~2–0~~
3	Tanzania	4	0	1	3	0	6	−6	1		0–2	0–0	—	Canc.
4	Chad	0	0	0	0	0	0	0	0	Withdrew (Note: On 27 March 2016, it was announced that Chad had withdrawn from the competition on financial grounds. At that point, Chad had played three matches, and all results were annulled and not taken into consideration according to the regulations. Moreover, the runners-up were not eligible to qualify as one of the two group runners-up with the best records.)	~~1–5~~	Canc.	~~0–1~~	—

Source: CAF

=== Group H ===
Pos	Team	Pld	W	D	L	GF	GA	GD	Pts	Qualification	Ghana	Mozambique	Rwanda	Mauritius
1	Ghana	6	4	2	0	14	3	+11	14	Final tournament	—	3–1	1–1	7–1
2	Mozambique	6	2	1	3	5	7	−2	7		0–0	—	0–1	1–0
3	Rwanda	6	2	1	3	9	6	+3	7		0–1	2–3	—	5–0
4	Mauritius	6	2	0	4	3	15	−12	6		0–2	1–0	1–0	—

Source: CAF

=== Group I ===
Pos	Team	Pld	W	D	L	GF	GA	GD	Pts	Qualification	Côte d'Ivoire	Sierra Leone	Sudan
1	Ivory Coast	4	1	3	0	3	2	+1	6	Final tournament	—	1–1	1–0
2	Sierra Leone	4	1	2	1	2	2	0	5		0–0	—	1–0
3	Sudan	4	1	1	2	2	3	−1	4		1–1	1–0	—

Source: CAF
- Gabon was also drawn into this group and played against the other three teams in the group; however, those matches were only considered friendlies and did not count for the standings.

=== Group J ===
Pos	Team	Pld	W	D	L	GF	GA	GD	Pts	Qualification	Algeria	Ethiopia	Seychelles	Lesotho
1	Algeria	6	5	1	0	25	5	+20	16	Final tournament	—	7–1	4–0	6–0
2	Ethiopia	6	3	2	1	11	14	−3	11		3–3	—	2–1	2–1
3	Seychelles	6	1	1	4	5	11	−6	4		0–2	1–1	—	2–0
4	Lesotho	6	1	0	5	5	16	−11	3		1–3	1–2	2–1	—

Source: CAF

=== Group K ===
Pos	Team	Pld	W	D	L	GF	GA	GD	Pts	Qualification	Senegal	Burundi	Namibia	Niger
1	Senegal	6	6	0	0	13	2	+11	18	Final tournament	—	3–1	2–0	2–0
2	Burundi	6	2	0	4	8	12	−4	6		0–2	—	1–3	2–0
3	Namibia	6	2	0	4	5	9	−4	6		0–2	1–3	—	1–0
4	Niger	6	2	0	4	5	8	−3	6		1–2	3–1	1–0	—

Source: CAF

=== Group L ===
Pos	Team	Pld	W	D	L	GF	GA	GD	Pts	Qualification	Zimbabwe	Eswatini	Guinea	Malawi
1	Zimbabwe	6	3	2	1	11	4	+7	11	Final tournament	—	4–0	1–1	3–0
2	Swaziland	6	2	2	2	6	9	−3	8		1–1	—	1–0	2–2
3	Guinea	6	2	2	2	5	5	0	8		1–0	1–2	—	0–0
4	Malawi	6	1	2	3	5	9	−4	5		1–2	1–0	1–2	—

Source: CAF

=== Group M ===
Pos	Team	Pld	W	D	L	GF	GA	GD	Pts	Qualification	Cameroon	Mauritania	South Africa	Gambia
1	Cameroon	6	4	2	0	7	2	+5	14	Final tournament	—	1–0	2–2	2–0
2	Mauritania	6	2	2	2	6	5	+1	8		0–1	—	3–1	2–1
3	South Africa	6	1	4	1	8	6	+2	7		0–0	1–1	—	0–0
4	Gambia	6	0	2	4	1	9	−8	2		0–1	0–0	0–4	—

Source: CAF

=== Ranking of second-placed teams ===
Only groups with four teams were considered for this ranking. Therefore, Group I was not considered, as well as Group G, where only three teams were left due to the withdrawal of one team.

Pos	Grp	Team	Pld	W	D	L	GF	GA	GD	Pts	Qualification
1	D	Uganda	6	4	1	1	6	2	+4	13	Final tournament
2	A	Togo	6	3	2	1	11	4	+7	11	Final tournament
3	C	Benin	6	3	2	1	12	10	+2	11	
4	J	Ethiopia	6	3	2	1	11	14	−3	11	
5	B	Central African Republic	6	3	1	2	9	11	−2	10	
6	F	Cape Verde	6	3	0	3	11	7	+4	9	
7	E	Congo	6	2	3	1	9	7	+2	9	
8	M	Mauritania	6	2	2	2	6	5	+1	8	
9	L	Swaziland	6	2	2	2	6	9	−3	8	
10	H	Mozambique	6	2	1	3	5	7	−2	7	
11	K	Burundi	6	2	0	4	8	12	−4	6	

Source: CAF
Rules for classification: 1) Points; 2) Goal difference; 3) Goals scored; 4) Drawing of lots

== Qualified teams ==
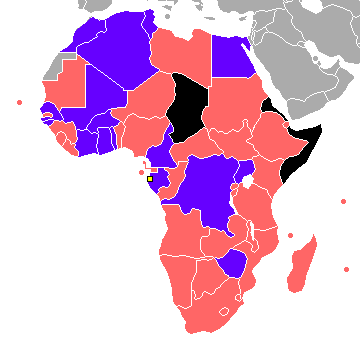
Qualified Failed to qualify Withdrew, disqualified or did not enter Not part of CAF

The following teams qualified for the tournament.

Team	Qualified as	Qualified on	Previous appearances in tournament^{1}
Gabon	Hosts	8 April 2015	6 (1994, 1996, 2000, 2010, 2012, 2015)
Morocco	Group F winners	29 March 2016	15 (1972, **1976**, 1978, 1980, 1986, 1988, 1992, 1998, 2000, 2002, 2004, 2006, 2008, 2012, 2013)
Algeria	Group J winners	2 June 2016	16 (1968, 1980, 1982, 1984, 1986, 1988, **1990**, 1992, 1996, 1998, 2000, 2002, 2004, 2010, 2013, 2015)
Cameroon	Group M winners	3 June 2016	17 (1970, 1972, 1982, **1984**, 1986, **1988**, 1990, 1992, 1996, 1998, **2000**, **2002**, 2004, 2006, 2008, 2010, 2015)
Senegal	Group K winners	4 June 2016	13 (1965, 1968, 1986, 1990, 1992, 1994, 2000, 2002, 2004, 2006, 2008, 2012, 2015)
Egypt	Group G winners	4 June 2016	22 (**1957**, **1959**, 1962, 1963, 1970, 1974, 1976, 1980, 1984, **1986**, 1988, 1990, 1992, 1994, 1996, **1998**, 2000, 2002, 2004, **2006**, **2008**, **2010**)
Ghana	Group H winners	5 June 2016	20 (**1963**, **1965**, 1968, 1970, **1978**, 1980, **1982**, 1984, 1992, 1994, 1996, 1998, 2000, 2002, 2006, 2008, 2010, 2012, 2013, 2015)
Guinea-Bissau	Group E winners	5 June 2016	0 (debut)
Zimbabwe	Group L winners	5 June 2016	2 (2004, 2006)
Mali	Group C winners	5 June 2016	9 (1972, 1994, 2002, 2004, 2008, 2010, 2012, 2013, 2015)
Ivory Coast	Group I winners	3 September 2016	21 (1965, 1968, 1970, 1974, 1980, 1984, 1986, 1988, 1990, **1992**, 1994, 1996, 1998, 2000, 2002, 2006, 2008, 2010, 2012, 2013, **2015**)
Uganda	Group D runners-up	4 September 2016	5 (1962, 1968, 1974, 1976, 1978)
Burkina Faso	Group D winners	4 September 2016	10 (1978, 1996, 1998, 2000, 2002, 2004, 2010, 2012, 2013, 2015)
Tunisia	Group A winners	4 September 2016	17 (1962, 1963, 1965, 1978, 1982, 1994, 1996, 1998, 2000, 2002, **2004**, 2006, 2008, 2010, 2012, 2013, 2015)
DR Congo	Group B winners	4 September 2016	17 (1965, **1968**, 1970, 1972, **1974**, 1976, 1988, 1992, 1994, 1996, 1998, 2000, 2002, 2004, 2006, 2013, 2015)
Togo	Group A runners-up	4 September 2016	7 (1972, 1984, 1998, 2000, 2002, 2006, 2013)

^{1} Bold indicates champion for that year. Italic indicates host for that year.

== Goalscorers ==
7 goals

- (Algeria) Hillal Soudani

6 goals

- (Ethiopia) Getaneh Kebede

5 goals

- (Benin) Stéphane Sessègnon
- (Burundi) Fiston Abdul Razak
- (Republic of the Congo) Férébory Doré
- (Liberia) William Jebor

4 goals

- (Algeria) Islam Slimani
- (Egypt) Mohamed Salah
- (Morocco) Youssef El-Arabi

3 goals

- (Angola) Gelson
- (Central African Republic) Moussa Limane
- (Democratic Republic of the Congo) Cédric Bakambu
- (Ghana) Jordan Ayew
- (Libya) Mohamed Zubya
- (Mali) Abdoulay Diaby
- (Mauritania) Cheikh Moulaye Ahmed
- (Rwanda) Ernest Sugira
- (Senegal) Sadio Mané
- (South Africa) Thamsanqa Gabuza
- (Tunisia) Yassine Chikhaoui
- (Zambia) Winston Kalengo
- (Zimbabwe) Khama Billiat
- (Zimbabwe) Knowledge Musona

2 goals

- (Algeria) Sofiane Feghouli
- (Algeria) Faouzi Ghoulam
- (Algeria) Saphir Taïder
- (Algeria) Riyad Mahrez
- (Benin) Frédéric Gounongbe
- (Botswana) Joel Mogorosi
- (Cameroon) Vincent Aboubakar
- (Cape Verde) Djaniny
- (Central African Republic) Vianney Mabidé
- (Republic of the Congo) Jordan Massengo
- (Republic of the Congo) Prince Oniangué
- (Democratic Republic of the Congo) Jonathan Bolingi
- (Democratic Republic of the Congo) Jordan Botaka
- (Democratic Republic of the Congo) Joël Kimwaki
- (Democratic Republic of the Congo) Paul-José M'Poku
- (Democratic Republic of the Congo) Ndombe Mubele
- (Equatorial Guinea) Emilio Nsue
- (Ethiopia) Saladin Said
- (Ghana) Christian Atsu
- (Ghana) Asamoah Gyan
- (Guinea) Idrissa Sylla
- (Guinea-Bissau) Zezinho
- (Kenya) Ayub Masika
- (Liberia) Anthony Laffor
- (Malawi) Chiukepo Msowoya
- (Malawi) Gerald Phiri Jr.
- (Mali) Moussa Doumbia
- (Mali) Modibo Maïga
- (Morocco) Nabil Dirar
- (Mozambique) Domingues
- (Mozambique) Apson Manjate
- (Namibia) Peter Shalulile
- (Niger) Victorien Adebayor
- (Rwanda) Jacques Tuyisenge
- (São Tomé and Príncipe) Luís Leal
- (Senegal) Mame Biram Diouf
- (Senegal) Moussa Konaté
- (Seychelles) Dine Suzette
- (South Africa) Keagan Dolly
- (South Africa) Hlompho Kekana
- (South Sudan) Atak Lual
- (Eswatini) Felix Badenhorst
- (Eswatini) Sabelo Ndzinisa
- (Eswatini) Tony Tsabedze
- (Togo) Komlan Agbégniadan
- (Togo) Floyd Ayité
- (Togo) Kodjo Fo-Doh Laba
- (Tunisia) Saber Khalifa
- (Tunisia) Taha Yassine Khenissi
- (Zambia) Collins Mbesuma
- (Zimbabwe) Cuthbert Malajila

1 goal

- (Algeria) Nabil Bentaleb
- (Algeria) Yassine Benzia
- (Algeria) Ryad Boudebouz
- (Algeria) Yacine Brahimi
- (Algeria) Rachid Ghezzal
- (Algeria) Aïssa Mandi
- (Angola) Fredy
- (Angola) Gilberto
- (Angola) Dolly Menga
- (Angola) Pana
- (Benin) Khaled Adénon
- (Benin) David Djigla
- (Benin) Jodel Dossou
- (Benin) Steve Mounié
- (Benin) Mickaël Poté
- (Botswana) Onkabetse Makgantai
- (Botswana) Galabgwe Moyana
- (Botswana) Thabang Sesinyi
- (Burkina Faso) Aristide Bancé
- (Burkina Faso) Banou Diawara
- (Burkina Faso) Préjuce Nakoulma
- (Burkina Faso) Jonathan Pitroipa
- (Burkina Faso) Alain Traoré
- (Burkina Faso) Jonathan Zongo
- (Burundi) Pierre Kwizera
- (Burundi) Abbas Nshimirimana
- (Burundi) Enock Sabumukama
- (Cameroon) Karl Toko Ekambi
- (Cameroon) Benjamin Moukandjo
- (Cameroon) Nicolas Nkoulou
- (Cameroon) Edgar Salli
- (Cameroon) Sébastien Siani
- (Cape Verde) Babanco
- (Cape Verde) Odaïr Fortes
- (Cape Verde) Ricardo Gomes
- (Cape Verde) Kay
- (Cape Verde) Ryan Mendes
- (Cape Verde) Nuno Jóia
- (Cape Verde) Nuno Rocha
- (Cape Verde) Garry Rodrigues
- (Cape Verde) Júlio Tavares
- (Central African Republic) Junior Gourrier
- (Central African Republic) Salif Kéïta
- (Central African Republic) Foxi Kéthévoama
- (Central African Republic) Eloge Enza Yamissi
- (Comoros) Youssouf M'Changama
- (Comoros) El Fardou Ben Nabouhane
- (Djibouti) Mohamed Liban
- (Democratic Republic of the Congo) Yannick Bolasie
- (Democratic Republic of the Congo) Neeskens Kebano
- (Democratic Republic of the Congo) Elia Meschak
- (Egypt) Basem Morsy
- (Egypt) Ramy Rabia
- (Egypt) Ramadan Sobhi
- (Equatorial Guinea) Carlos Akapo
- (Equatorial Guinea) Josete Miranda
- (Equatorial Guinea) Randy
- (Equatorial Guinea) Iván Zarandona
- (Ethiopia) Dawit Fekadu
- (Ethiopia) Gatoch Panom
- (Ethiopia) Seyoum Tesfaye
- (The Gambia) Mustapha Carayol
- (Ghana) David Accam
- (Ghana) Frank Acheampong
- (Ghana) André Ayew
- (Ghana) John Boye
- (Ghana) Jeffrey Schlupp
- (Ghana) Samuel Tetteh
- (Ghana) Mubarak Wakaso
- (Guinea) François Kamano
- (Guinea) Guy-Michel Landel
- (Guinea) Mohamed Yattara
- (Guinea-Bissau) Idrissa Camará
- (Guinea-Bissau) Cícero
- (Guinea-Bissau) Eridson
- (Guinea-Bissau) Frédéric Mendy
- (Guinea-Bissau) Toni Silva
- (Ivory Coast) Gervinho
- (Ivory Coast) Max Gradel
- (Ivory Coast) Jonathan Kodjia
- (Kenya) Eric Johanna
- (Kenya) Michael Olunga
- (Kenya) Paul Were
- (Lesotho) Sunny Jane
- (Lesotho) Tumelo Khutlang
- (Lesotho) Ralekoti Mokhahlane
- (Lesotho) Bokang Mothoana
- (Lesotho) Jane Thabantso
- (Liberia) Francis Doe
- (Liberia) Gizzie Dorbor
- (Liberia) Sam Johnson
- (Liberia) Mark Paye
- (Libya) Faisal Al Badri
- (Libya) Sanad Al Ouarfali
- (Libya) Fouad Al Triki
- (Libya) Mohamed El Monir
- (Libya) Almoatasembellah Mohamed
- (Madagascar) Carolus Andriamatsinoro
- (Madagascar) Faneva Imà Andriatsima
- (Madagascar) Fabrice Angio Rakotondraibe
- (Madagascar) Pascal Razakanantenaina
- (Madagascar) Sarivahy Vombola
- (Malawi) John Banda
- (Mali) Salif Coulibaly
- (Mali) Moussa Marega
- (Mali) Adama Traoré
- (Mali) Molla Wagué
- (Mali) Mustapha Yatabaré
- (Mali) Sambou Yatabaré
- (Mauritania) Aly Abeid
- (Mauritania) Boubacar Bagili
- (Mauritania) Diallo Guidileye
- (Mauritius) Fabien Pithia
- (Mauritius) Francis Rasolofonirina
- (Mauritius) Andy Sophie
- (Morocco) Nordin Amrabat
- (Morocco) Aziz Bouhaddouz
- (Morocco) Omar El Kaddouri
- (Morocco) Hakim Ziyech
- (Mozambique) Bheu Januário
- (Namibia) Deon Hotto
- (Namibia) Benson Shilongo
- (Namibia) Hendrik Somaeb
- (Niger) Koffi Dan Kowa
- (Niger) Moussa Maâzou
- (Niger) Souleymane Dela Sacko
- (Nigeria) Kelechi Iheanacho
- (Nigeria) Etebo Oghenekaro
- (Rwanda) Jean-Baptiste Mugiraneza
- (Rwanda) Muhadjiri Hakizimana
- (Rwanda) Dominique Savio Nshuti
- (Rwanda) Fitina Omborenga
- (São Tomé and Príncipe) Faduley
- (Senegal) Keita Baldé
- (Senegal) Mohamed Diamé
- (Senegal) Famara Diedhiou
- (Senegal) Cheikhou Kouyaté
- (Senegal) Oumar Niasse
- (Senegal) Pape Souaré
- (Seychelles) Achille Henriette
- (Seychelles) Nelson Laurence
- (Seychelles) Gervais Waye-Hive
- (Sierra Leone) Shéka Fofana
- (Sierra Leone) Kei Kamara
- (South Africa) Tokelo Rantie
- (South Sudan) Sebit Bruno
- (Sudan) Ramadan Alagab
- (Sudan) Muhannad El Tahir
- (Togo) Emmanuel Adebayor
- (Togo) Serge Akakpo
- (Togo) Vincent Bossou
- (Togo) Mathieu Dossevi
- (Togo) Sadat Ouro-Akoriko
- (Tunisia) Fakhreddine Ben Youssef
- (Tunisia) Maher Hannachi
- (Tunisia) Hamdi Harbaoui
- (Tunisia) Wahbi Khazri
- (Tunisia) Hamza Lahmar
- (Tunisia) Youssef Msakni
- (Tunisia) Ferjani Sassi
- (Tunisia) Naïm Sliti
- (Tunisia) Yoann Touzghar
- (Uganda) Khalid Aucho
- (Uganda) Luwagga Kizito
- (Uganda) Geofrey Massa
- (Uganda) Tony Mawejje
- (Uganda) Farouk Miya
- (Uganda) Brian Umony
- (Zambia) Rainford Kalaba
- (Zambia) Christopher Katongo
- (Zimbabwe) Costa Nhamoinesu
- (Zimbabwe) Evans Rusike

1 own goal

- (Libya) Ahmed El Trbi (against São Tomé and Príncipe)
- (Eswatini) Njabulo Ndlovu (against Zimbabwe)
