= 2017 Africa Cup of Nations qualification Group F =

Football tournament qualification stage

Group F of the 2017 Africa Cup of Nations qualification tournament was one of the thirteen groups to decide the teams which qualified for the 2017 Africa Cup of Nations finals tournament. The group consisted of four teams: Cape Verde, Morocco, Libya, and São Tomé and Príncipe.

The teams played against each other home-and-away in a round-robin format, between June 2015 and September 2016.

Morocco, the group winners, qualified for the 2017 Africa Cup of Nations.

== Standings ==
Pos	Team	Pld	W	D	L	GF	GA	GD	Pts	Qualification	Morocco	Cape Verde	Libya	São Tomé and Príncipe
1	Morocco	6	5	1	0	10	1	+9	16	Final tournament	—	2–0	1–0	2–0
2	Cape Verde	6	3	0	3	11	7	+4	9		0–1	—	0–1	7–1
3	Libya	6	2	1	3	8	6	+2	7		1–1	1–2	—	4–0
4	São Tomé and Príncipe	6	1	0	5	4	19	−15	3		0–3	1–2	2–1	—

Source: CAF
Rules for classification: Qualification tiebreakers

== Matches ==
12 June 2015
20:00 UTC+1

Morocco	1–0	Libya
El Kaddouri 50'	Report

Stade Adrar, Agadir
Referee: William Agbovi (Ghana)
13 June 2015
16:00 UTC−1

Cape Verde	7–1	São Tomé and Príncipe
Djaniny 10', 73'; Rocha 17' (pen.); Rodrigues 38'; Fortes 41'; Babanco 51' (pen.); Tavares 75'	Report	Leal 54'

Estádio Nacional de Cabo Verde, Praia
Referee: Mahmoud Ashour (Egypt)

5 September 2015
15:30 UTC±0

São Tomé and Príncipe	0–3	Morocco
	Report	Amrabat 34'; El Arabi 38'; Dirar 41'

Estádio Nacional 12 de Julho, São Tomé
Referee: João Goma (Angola)
6 September 2015
19:00 UTC+2

Libya	1–2	Cape Verde
Elmusrati 85'	Report	Kay 57'; Mendes 89'

Petro Sport Stadium, Cairo (Egypt) (Note: Libya will play their home matches outside of their country due to security concerns.)
Referee: Mustapha Ghorbal (Algeria)

23 March 2016
15:30 UTC±0

São Tomé and Príncipe	2–1	Libya
El Trbi 83' (o.g.); Leal 88'	Report	Al Badri 23'

Estádio Nacional 12 de Julho, São Tomé
Referee: Aboubacar Bangoura (Guinea)
26 March 2016
16:00 UTC−1

Cape Verde	0–1	Morocco
	Report	El-Arabi 25' (pen.)

Estádio Nacional de Cabo Verde, Praia
Referee: Sidi Alioum (Cameroon)

28 March 2016
19:00 UTC+2

Libya	4–0	São Tomé and Príncipe
Zubya 51', 56', 74'; El Monir 70'	Report

Petro Sport Stadium, Cairo (Egypt)
Referee: Akintoye Koole (Benin)
29 March 2016
20:00 UTC+1

Morocco	2–0	Cape Verde
El-Arabi 55' (pen.), 60'	Report

Stade de Marrakech, Marrakesh
Referee: Mahamadou Keita (Mali)

3 June 2016
19:00 UTC+1

Libya	1–1	Morocco
Al Ouarfali 90'	Report	Dirar 36'

Stade Olympique de Radès, Radès (Tunisia)
Referee: Youssef Essrayri (Tunisia)
4 June 2016
15:30 UTC±0

São Tomé and Príncipe	1–2	Cape Verde
Faduley 87'	Report	Gomes 50'; Da Costa 79'

Estádio Nacional 12 de Julho, São Tomé
Referee: Malang Diedhiou (Senegal)

3 September 2016
16:00 UTC−1

Cape Verde	0–1	Libya
	Report	Al Triki 89'

Estádio Nacional de Cabo Verde, Praia
Referee: Bamlak Tessema Weyesa (Ethiopia)
4 September 2016
20:00 UTC+1

Morocco	2–0	São Tomé and Príncipe
Ziyech 54' (pen.); Bouhaddouz 82'	Report

Prince Moulay Abdellah Stadium, Rabat
Referee: Fidel Gomes (Guinea-Bissau)

== Goalscorers ==
4 goals

- (Morocco) Youssef El-Arabi

3 goals

- (Libya) Mohamed Zubya

2 goals

- (Cape Verde) Djaniny
- (Morocco) Nabil Dirar
- (São Tomé and Príncipe) Luís Leal

1 goal

- (Cape Verde) Babanco
- (Cape Verde) Odaïr Fortes
- (Cape Verde) Ricardo Gomes
- (Cape Verde) Kay
- (Cape Verde) Ryan Mendes
- (Cape Verde) Nuno Jóia
- (Cape Verde) Nuno Rocha
- (Cape Verde) Garry Rodrigues
- (Cape Verde) Júlio Tavares
- (Libya) Faisal Al Badri
- (Libya) Sanad Al Ouarfali
- (Libya) Fouad Al Triki
- (Libya) Mohamed El Monir
- (Libya) Ali Elmusrati
- (Morocco) Nordin Amrabat
- (Morocco) Aziz Bouhaddouz
- (Morocco) Omar El Kaddouri
- (Morocco) Hakim Ziyech
- (São Tomé and Príncipe) Faduley

1 own goal

- (Libya) Ahmed El Trbi (playing against São Tomé and Príncipe)
