= Nshimirimana =

Nshimirimana is a surname. Notable people with the surname include:

- Abbas Nshimirimana (born 1998), Burundian football player
- Adolphe Nshimirimana (died 2015), Burundian military general who served as army chief of staff
- Joachim Nshimirimana (born 1973), Burundian athlete in marathon and long-distance running
