= 2017 Africa Cup of Nations qualification Group K =

Football tournament qualification stage

Group K of the 2017 Africa Cup of Nations qualification tournament was one of the thirteen groups to decide the teams which qualified for the 2017 Africa Cup of Nations finals tournament. The group consisted of four teams: Senegal, Niger, Namibia, and Burundi.

The teams played against each other home-and-away in a round-robin format, between June 2015 and September 2016.

Senegal, the group winners, qualified for the 2017 Africa Cup of Nations.

== Standings ==
Pos	Team	Pld	W	D	L	GF	GA	GD	Pts	Qualification	Senegal	Burundi	Namibia	Niger
1	Senegal	6	6	0	0	13	2	+11	18	Final tournament	—	3–1	2–0	2–0
2	Burundi	6	2	0	4	8	12	−4	6		0–2	—	1–3	2–0
3	Namibia	6	2	0	4	5	9	−4	6		0–2	1–3	—	1–0
4	Niger	6	2	0	4	5	8	−3	6		1–2	3–1	1–0	—

Source: CAF
Rules for classification: Qualification tiebreakers

== Matches ==
13 June 2015
19:00 UTC±0

Senegal	3–1	Burundi
Konaté 14' (pen.); Diouf 62'; Mané 90'	Report	Abdul Razak 58'

Stade Léopold Sédar Senghor, Dakar
Referee: Mahamadou Keita (Mali)
14 June 2015
16:00 UTC+1

Niger	1–0	Namibia
Sacko 34' (pen.)	Report

Stade Général Seyni Kountché, Niamey
Referee: Maudo Jallow (Gambia)

5 September 2015
14:30 UTC+1

Namibia	0–2	Senegal
	Report	Kouyaté 35'; Mané 56'

Sam Nujoma Stadium, Windhoek
Referee: Wellington Kaoma (Zambia)
5 September 2015
15:30 UTC+2

Burundi	2–0	Niger
Abdul Razak 25'; Nshimirimana 81'	Report

Prince Louis Rwagasore Stadium, Bujumbura
Referee: Sylvester Kirwa (Kenya)

26 March 2016
15:00 UTC+2

Burundi	1–3	Namibia
Abdul Razak 80'	Report	Shilongo 51'; Shalulile 54'; Somaeb 82'

Prince Louis Rwagasore Stadium, Bujumbura
Referee: Idriss Biani (Chad)
26 March 2016
19:00 UTC±0

Senegal	2–0	Niger
Diamé 16'; Niasse 68'	Report

Stade Léopold Sédar Senghor, Dakar
Referee: Mohamed Ragab Omar (Libya)

29 March 2016
15:00 UTC+1

Niger	1–2	Senegal
Adebayor 67' (pen.)	Report	Konaté 22' (pen.); Souaré 43'

Stade Général Seyni Kountché, Niamey
Referee: Mohamed Benouza (Algeria)
29 March 2016
17:00 UTC+2

Namibia	1–3	Burundi
Hotto 4'	Report	Kwizera 43'; Abdul Razak 71', 79'

Sam Nujoma Stadium, Windhoek
Referee: Osiase Koto (Lesotho)

4 June 2016
15:00 UTC+2

Burundi	0–2	Senegal
	Report	Mané 16'; Diouf 42'

Prince Louis Rwagasore Stadium, Bujumbura
Referee: Bernard Camille (Seychelles)
4 June 2016
15:00 UTC+1

Namibia	1–0	Niger
Shalulile 25'	Report

Sam Nujoma Stadium, Windhoek
Referee: Hélder Martins de Carvalho (Angola)

3 September 2016
17:30 UTC±0

Senegal	2–0	Namibia
Keita 32'; Diedhiou 90' (pen.)	Report

Stade Léopold Sédar Senghor, Dakar
Referee: Bienvenu Sinko (Ivory Coast)
4 September 2016
18:30 UTC+1

Niger	3–1	Burundi
Adebayor 8'; Maâzou 16'; Dan Kowa 90+4'	Report	Sabumukama 90+2'

Stade Général Seyni Kountché, Niamey
Referee: Ferdinand Udoh (Nigeria)

== Goalscorers ==
5 goals

- (Burundi) Fiston Abdul Razak

3 goals

- (Senegal) Sadio Mané

2 goals

- (Niger) Victorien Adebayor
- (Namibia) Peter Shalulile
- (Senegal) Mame Biram Diouf
- (Senegal) Moussa Konaté

1 goal

- (Burundi) Pierre Kwizera
- (Burundi) Abbas Nshimirimana
- (Burundi) Enock Sabumukama
- (Namibia) Deon Hotto
- (Namibia) Benson Shilongo
- (Namibia) Hendrik Somaeb
- (Niger) Koffi Dan Kowa
- (Niger) Moussa Maâzou
- (Niger) Souleymane Dela Sacko
- (Senegal) Keita Baldé
- (Senegal) Mohamed Diamé
- (Senegal) Famara Diedhiou
- (Senegal) Cheikhou Kouyaté
- (Senegal) Oumar Niasse
- (Senegal) Pape Souaré
