= 2017 Africa Cup of Nations qualification Group M =

International football competition

Group M of the 2017 Africa Cup of Nations qualification tournament was one of the thirteen groups to decide the teams which qualified for the 2017 Africa Cup of Nations finals tournament. The group consisted of four teams: Cameroon, South Africa, Gambia, and Mauritania.

The teams played against each other home-and-away in a round-robin format, between June 2015 and September 2016.

Cameroon, the group winners, qualified for the 2017 Africa Cup of Nations.

== Standings ==
Pos	Team	Pld	W	D	L	GF	GA	GD	Pts	Qualification	Cameroon	Mauritania	South Africa	Gambia
1	Cameroon	6	4	2	0	7	2	+5	14	Final tournament	—	1–0	2–2	2–0
2	Mauritania	6	2	2	2	6	5	+1	8		0–1	—	3–1	2–1
3	South Africa	6	1	4	1	8	6	+2	7		0–0	1–1	—	0–0
4	Gambia	6	0	2	4	1	9	−8	2		0–1	0–0	0–4	—

Source: CAF
Rules for classification: Qualification tiebreakers

== Matches ==
13 June 2015
19:00 UTC+2 (Note: The South Africa v Gambia match was delayed from the original kick-off time of 15:00 local time due to late arrival of officials.)

South Africa	0–0	Gambia
	Report

Moses Mabhida Stadium, Durban
Referee: Hamada Nampiandraza (Madagascar)
14 June 2015
15:00 UTC+1

Cameroon	1–0	Mauritania
Aboubakar 89'	Report

Ahmadou Ahidjo Stadium, Yaoundé
Referee: Yakhouba Keita (Guinea)

5 September 2015
17:00 UTC±0

Mauritania	3–1	South Africa
Abeid 5'; Bagili 77'; Moulaye Ahmed 85'	Report	Gabuza 68'

Stade Olympique, Nouakchott
Referee: Daouda Guèye (Senegal)
6 September 2015
16:30 UTC±0

Gambia	0–1	Cameroon
	Report	Aboubakar 65'

Independence Stadium, Bakau
Referee: Mohamed Said Kordi (Tunisia)

25 March 2016
16:30 UTC±0

Mauritania	2–1	Gambia
Moulaye Ahmed 36', 90+5'	Report	Carayol 59'

Stade Olympique, Nouakchott
Referee: Isaac Montgomery (Liberia)
26 March 2016
15:30 UTC+1

Cameroon	2–2	South Africa
Siani 45+1'; Nkoulou 66'	Report	Rantie 17'; Kekana 50'

Limbe Stadium, Limbe
Referee: Bamlak Tessema Weyesa (Ethiopia)

29 March 2016
16:30 UTC±0

Gambia	0–0	Mauritania
	Report

Independence Stadium, Bakau
Referee: Fidel Gomes (Guinea-Bissau)
29 March 2016
19:00 UTC+2

South Africa	0–0	Cameroon
	Report

Moses Mabhida Stadium, Durban
Referee: Juste Ephrem Zio (Burkina Faso)

3 June 2016
17:00 UTC±0

Mauritania	0–1	Cameroon
	Report	Salli 29'

Stade Olympique, Nouakchott
Referee: Hamada Nampiandraza (Madagascar)
4 June 2016
17:00 UTC±0

Gambia	0–4	South Africa
	Report	Gabuza 29', 38'; Dolly 55', 79'

Independence Stadium, Bakau
Referee: Denis Dembélé (Ivory Coast)

2 September 2016
19:00 UTC+2

South Africa	1–1	Mauritania
Kekana 26'	Report	Guidileye 16'

Mbombela Stadium, Nelspruit
Referee: Eric Otogo-Castane (Gabon)
3 September 2016
15:30 UTC+1

Cameroon	2–0	Gambia
Moukandjo 34' (pen.); Toko Ekambi 53'	Report

Limbe Stadium, Limbe
Referee: Joseph Lamptey (Ghana)

== Goalscorers ==
3 goals

- (Mauritania) Cheikh Moulaye Ahmed
- (South Africa) Thamsanqa Gabuza

2 goals

- (Cameroon) Vincent Aboubakar
- (South Africa) Keagan Dolly
- (South Africa) Hlompho Kekana

1 goal

- (Cameroon) Karl Toko Ekambi
- (Cameroon) Benjamin Moukandjo
- (Cameroon) Nicolas Nkoulou
- (Cameroon) Edgar Salli
- (Cameroon) Sébastien Siani
- (The Gambia) Mustapha Carayol
- (Mauritania) Aly Abeid
- (Mauritania) Boubacar Bagili
- (Mauritania) Diallo Guidileye
- (South Africa) Tokelo Rantie
