= Massengo =

Massengo is a surname. Notable people with the surname include:

- Aloïse Moudileno-Massengo (1933–2020), French-Congolese lawyer and politician
- Han-Noah Massengo (born 2001), French footballer
- Jordan Massengo (born 1990), Congolese footballer

== See also ==
- Masengo
