= Masengo =

Masengo is a Congolese given name and surname. Notable people with the name include:

- Masengo Ilunga, Congolese football midfielder

== See also ==
- Massengo
