= 2017 Africa Cup of Nations qualification Group G =

Football tournament qualification stage

Group G of the 2017 Africa Cup of Nations qualification tournament was one of the thirteen groups to decide the teams which qualified for the 2017 Africa Cup of Nations finals tournament.

The teams in the group played against each other home-and-away in a round-robin format, between June 2015 and September 2016. The group originally consisted of four teams: Nigeria, Egypt, Tanzania, and Chad. However, on 27 March 2016 it was announced that Chad had withdrawn from the competition on financial grounds. As per the competition's regulations, the matches involving Chad and played up to that point were annulled, and the scheduled forthcoming matches involving Chad were cancelled.

Egypt, the group winners, qualified for the 2017 Africa Cup of Nations. After Chad's withdrawal, the runners-up could no longer qualify as one of the two group runners-up with the best records, as any groups reduced to just three teams had only the group winner qualifying for the finals and were not considered when determining the best second-placed teams.

== Standings ==
Pos	Team	Pld	W	D	L	GF	GA	GD	Pts	Qualification	Egypt	Nigeria	Tanzania	Chad
1	Egypt	4	3	1	0	7	1	+6	10	Final tournament	—	1–0	3–0	Canc.
2	Nigeria	4	1	2	1	2	2	0	5		1–1	—	1–0	~~2–0~~
3	Tanzania	4	0	1	3	0	6	−6	1		0–2	0–0	—	Canc.
4	Chad	0	0	0	0	0	0	0	0	Withdrew (Note: On 27 March 2016, it was announced that Chad had withdrawn from the competition on financial grounds. At that point, Chad had played three matches, and all results were annulled and not taken into consideration according to the regulations. Moreover, the runners-up were not eligible to qualify as one of the two group runners-up with the best records.)	~~1–5~~	Canc.	~~0–1~~	—

Source: CAF
Rules for classification: Qualification tiebreakers

== Matches ==
13 June 2015
16:00 UTC+1

Nigeria	Annulled (originally 2–0)	Chad
Salami 63'; Ighalo 79' (pen.)	Report

Ahmadu Bello Stadium, Kaduna
Referee: Assoumane Moussa Gnali (Niger)
14 June 2015
19:00 UTC+2

Egypt	3–0	Tanzania
Rabia 60'; Morsy 64'; Salah 69'	Report

Borg El Arab Stadium, Alexandria
Referee: Bamlak Tessema Weyesa (Ethiopia)

5 September 2015
16:30 UTC+3

Tanzania	0–0	Nigeria
	Report

National Stadium, Dar es Salaam
Referee: Louis Hakizimana (Rwanda)
6 September 2015
15:30 UTC+1

Chad	Annulled (originally 1–5)	Egypt
Haroun 37'	Report	Morsy 2', 24', 61'; Salah 39'; Kahraba 55'

Stade Omnisports Idriss Mahamat Ouya, N'Djamena
Referee: Bienvenu Sinko (Ivory Coast)

23 March 2016
15:30 UTC+1

Chad	Annulled (originally 0–1)	Tanzania
	Report	Samatta 32'

Stade Omnisports Idriss Mahamat Ouya, N'Djamena
Referee: Jean-Jacques Ndala (DR Congo)
25 March 2016
17:00 UTC+1

Nigeria	1–1	Egypt
Etebo 60'	Report	Salah 90'

Ahmadu Bello Stadium, Kaduna
Referee: Janny Sikazwe (Zambia)

28 March 2016
16:00 UTC+3

Tanzania	Cancelled	Chad
	Report

National Stadium, Dar es Salaam
Referee: Djamal Aden (Djibouti)
29 March 2016
19:00 UTC+2

Egypt	1–0	Nigeria
Sobhi 66'	Report

Borg El Arab Stadium, Alexandria
Attendance: 65,000
Referee: Daniel Bennett (South Africa)

3 June 2016

Chad	Cancelled	Nigeria
	Report

4 June 2016
16:00 UTC+3

Tanzania	0–2	Egypt
	Report	Salah 44', 58'

National Stadium, Dar es Salaam
Referee: Eric Otogo-Castane (Gabon)

2 September 2016

Egypt	Cancelled	Chad
	Report

3 September 2016
17:00 UTC+1

Nigeria	1–0	Tanzania
Iheanacho 78'	Report

Akwa Ibom Stadium, Uyo
Referee: Mehdi Abid Charef (Algeria)

== Goalscorers ==
As all results of Chad were annulled (points, scored and conceded goals), goalscorers in matches involving Chad are not counted.

3 goals

- (Egypt) Basem Morsy

1 goal

- (Egypt) Mohamed Salah
- (Egypt) Ramy Rabia
- (Egypt) Ramadan Sobhi
- (Nigeria) Kelechi Iheanacho
- (Nigeria) Oghenekaro Etebo
