= 2017 Africa Cup of Nations qualification Group A =

Football tournament qualification stage

Group A of the 2017 Africa Cup of Nations qualification tournament was one of the thirteen groups to decide the teams which qualified for the 2017 Africa Cup of Nations finals tournament. The group consisted of four teams: Tunisia, Togo, Liberia, and Djibouti.

The teams played against each other home-and-away in a round-robin format, between June 2015 and September 2016.

Tunisia, the group winners, qualified for the 2017 Africa Cup of Nations, while group runners-up Togo also qualified due to being one of the two group runners-up with the best records.

== Standings ==
Pos	Team	Pld	W	D	L	GF	GA	GD	Pts	Qualification	Tunisia	Togo	Liberia	Djibouti
1	Tunisia	6	4	1	1	16	3	+13	13	Final tournament	—	1–0	4–1	8–1
2	Togo	6	3	2	1	11	4	+7	11	Final tournament	0–0	—	2–1	5–0
3	Liberia	6	3	1	2	11	8	+3	10		1–0	2–2	—	5–0
4	Djibouti	6	0	0	6	1	24	−23	0		0–3	0–2	0–1	—

Source: CAF
Rules for classification: Qualification tiebreakers

== Matches ==
12 June 2015
20:30 UTC+1

Tunisia	8–1	Djibouti
Chikhaoui 9' (pen.), 22', 23'; Sassi 37'; Khalifa 62'; Ben Youssef 68'; Hannachi 80'; Touzghar 81'	Report	Liban 54' (pen.)

Stade Olympique de Radès, Tunis
Referee: Noureddine El Jaafari (Morocco)
14 June 2015
15:30 UTC±0

Togo	2–1	Liberia
Ouro-Akoriko 64'; Adebayor 87'	Report	Jebor 43'

Stade de Kégué, Lomé
Referee: Denis Dembélé (Ivory Coast)

4 September 2015
16:00 UTC+3

Djibouti	0–2	Togo
	Report	Akakpo 5'; F. Ayité 43'

Stade du Ville, Djibouti City
Referee: Ring Nyier Akech Malong (South Sudan)
5 September 2015
16:00 UTC±0

Liberia	1–0	Tunisia
Doe 79'	Report

Antoinette Tubman Stadium, Monrovia
Referee: Maudo Jallow (Gambia)

24 March 2016
16:00 UTC+3

Djibouti	0–1	Liberia
	Report	Laffor 57'

Stade du Ville, Djibouti City
Referee: Idris Mehammed Osman (Eritrea)
25 March 2016
18:00 UTC+1

Tunisia	1–0	Togo
Msakni 46'	Report

Stade Mustapha Ben Jannet, Monastir
Referee: Joshua Bondo (Botswana)

29 March 2016
15:00 UTC±0

Togo	0–0	Tunisia
	Report

Stade de Kégué, Lomé
Referee: Bakary Gassama (Gambia)
29 March 2016
16:00 UTC±0

Liberia	5–0	Djibouti
Laffor 8' (pen.); Johnson 28'; Jebor 46', 56', 90'	Report

Antoinette Tubman Stadium, Monrovia
Referee: António Rodrigues (Cape Verde)

3 June 2016
15:30 UTC+3

Djibouti	0–3	Tunisia
	Report	Sliti 15'; Harbaoui 43'; Khenissi 58'

Stade du Ville, Djibouti City
Referee: Thierry Nkurunziza (Burundi)
5 June 2016
16:00 UTC±0

Liberia	2–2	Togo
Dorbor 5'; Jebor 54'	Report	F. Ayité 67'; Fo-Doh Laba 83'

Antoinette Tubman Stadium, Monrovia
Referee: Gehad Grisha (Egypt)

4 September 2016
18:30 UTC+1

Tunisia	4–1	Liberia
Khazri 5'; Khenissi 35'; Khalifa 72'; Lahmar 77' (pen.)	Report	Paye 71'

Stade Mustapha Ben Jannet, Monastir
Referee: Daniel Bennett (South Africa)
4 September 2016
17:30 UTC±0

Togo	5–0	Djibouti
Bossou 24'; Dossevi 43'; Fo-Doh Laba 55'; Agbégniadan 88', 90'	Report

Stade de Kégué, Lomé
Referee: Gomno Daouda (Niger)

== Goalscorers ==
5 goals

- (Liberia) William Jebor

3 goals

- (Tunisia) Yassine Chikhaoui

2 goals

- (Liberia) Anthony Laffor
- (Togo) Komlan Agbégniadan
- (Togo) Floyd Ayité
- (Togo) Kodjo Fo-Doh Laba
- (Tunisia) Saber Khalifa
- (Tunisia) Taha Yassine Khenissi

1 goal

- (Djibouti) Mohamed Liban
- (Liberia) Francis Doe
- (Liberia) Gizzie Dorbor
- (Liberia) Sam Johnson
- (Liberia) Mark Paye
- (Togo) Emmanuel Adebayor
- (Togo) Serge Akakpo
- (Togo) Sadat Ouro-Akoriko
- (Togo) Vincent Bossou
- (Togo) Mathieu Dossevi
- (Tunisia) Fakhreddine Ben Youssef
- (Tunisia) Maher Hannachi
- (Tunisia) Hamdi Harbaoui
- (Tunisia) Wahbi Khazri
- (Tunisia) Hamza Lahmar
- (Tunisia) Youssef Msakni
- (Tunisia) Ferjani Sassi
- (Tunisia) Naïm Sliti
- (Tunisia) Yoann Touzghar
