= 2017 Africa Cup of Nations qualification Group I =

Football tournament qualification stage

Group I of the 2017 Africa Cup of Nations qualification tournament was one of the thirteen groups to decide the teams which qualified for the 2017 Africa Cup of Nations finals tournament. The group consisted of three teams: Ivory Coast, Sudan, and Sierra Leone. The hosts of the final tournament, Gabon, had also been drawn into this group and played games against the other three teams in the group; however, these matches were only considered as friendlies and not counted for the standings.

The teams played against each other home-and-away in a round-robin format, between June 2015 and September 2016.

Ivory Coast, the group winners, qualified for the 2017 Africa Cup of Nations. Since this group only had three teams, the runners-up were not eligible to qualify as one of the two group runners-up with the best records.

== Standings ==
Pos	Team	Pld	W	D	L	GF	GA	GD	Pts	Qualification	Côte d'Ivoire	Sierra Leone	Sudan
1	Ivory Coast	4	1	3	0	3	2	+1	6	Final tournament	—	1–1	1–0
2	Sierra Leone	4	1	2	1	2	2	0	5		0–0	—	1–0
3	Sudan	4	1	1	2	2	3	−1	4		1–1	1–0	—

Source: CAF
Rules for classification: Qualification tiebreakers

== Matches ==
14 June 2015
20:00 UTC+3

Sudan	1–0	Sierra Leone
Ramadan 77' (pen.)	Report

Khartoum Stadium, Khartoum
Referee: Denis Batte (Uganda)

6 September 2015
16:00 UTC+1

Sierra Leone	0–0	Ivory Coast
	Report

Adokiye Amiesimaka Stadium, Port Harcourt (Nigeria) (Note: Sierra Leone played their home match against Ivory Coast outside of their country due to Ebola outbreak.)
Referee: Mahamadou Keita (Mali)

25 March 2016
16:30 UTC±0

Ivory Coast	1–0	Sudan
Gervinho 34'	Report

Stade Félix Houphouët-Boigny, Abidjan
Referee: Mehdi Abid Charef (Algeria)

29 March 2016
21:00 UTC+3

Sudan	1–1	Ivory Coast
Muhannad 29'	Report	Gradel 16'

Al-Merrikh Stadium, Omdurman
Referee: Hudu Munyemana (Rwanda)

4 June 2016
16:30 UTC±0

Sierra Leone	1–0	Sudan
Fofana 65'	Report

National Stadium, Freetown
Referee: Sidi Alioum (Cameroon)

3 September 2016
18:00 UTC±0

Ivory Coast	1–1	Sierra Leone
Kodjia 35'	Report	K. Kamara 66'

Stade Bouaké, Bouaké
Referee: Hamada Nampiandraza (Madagascar)

== Centralised friendlies ==
14 June 2015 (Note: The two matches between Gabon and Ivory Coast were reversed from the original fixtures.)
18:00 UTC+1

Gabon	0–0	Ivory Coast
	Report

Stade d'Angondjé, Libreville
Referee: Davies Omweno (Kenya)

5 September 2015
18:00 UTC+1

Gabon	4–0	Sudan
Evouna 29', 66'; Mbingui 61'; Aubameyang 70'	Report

Stade d'Angondjé, Libreville
Referee: Janny Sikazwe (Zambia)

25 March 2016
15:30 UTC+1

Gabon	2–1	Sierra Leone
Aubameyang 33' (pen.); Evouna 56'	Report	Fofana 82'

Stade de Franceville, Franceville
Referee: Hagi Wiish (Somalia)

28 March 2016
16:30 UTC±0

Sierra Leone	1–0	Gabon
Bangura 13' (pen.)	Report

National Stadium, Freetown
Referee: Daouda Guèye (Senegal)

4 June 2016
17:30 UTC±0

Ivory Coast	2–1	Gabon
Kodjia 52'; Diomandé 71'	Report	Evouna 81'

Stade Bouaké, Bouaké
Referee: Ali Lemghaifry (Mauritania)

2 September 2016
20:00 UTC+3

Sudan	1–2	Gabon
Hamid 24'	Report	Aubameyang 32'; Manga 40'

Khartoum Stadium, Khartoum
Referee: Bouchaïb El Ahrach (Morocco)

== Goalscorers ==
1 goal

- (Ivory Coast) Gervinho
- (Ivory Coast) Max Gradel
- (Ivory Coast) Jonathan Kodjia
- (Sierra Leone) Shéka Fofana
- (Sierra Leone) Kei Kamara
- (Sudan) Ramadan Alagab
- (Sudan) Muhannad El Tahir
