= Étoile Lusitana =

Senegalese football academy

Étoile Lusitana Club
- Founded: 20 April 2008
- Ground: Dakar
- Owner: Luís Norton de Matos
- Chairman: (Senegal) Ousmane Dieng
- Manager: (Senegal) Oumar Diatta
- League: Senegal – Ligue 2 Poule A
- 2010-11: 6th

Étoile Lusitana Club (English: Lusitanian Star) is a Senegalese youth football academy based in Dakar.

== History ==
Lusitania was founded on 20 April 2008 by Luís Norton de Matos, who holds 80% on the rights of the club, the other 20% holds a Senegalese company.

The team's academy made international headlines when it won the premier section of the Northern Ireland Milk Cup competition in 2010. The club's name is taken from the ancient name of the Roman Province in Portugal.

In the 2009 season, the team finished in sixth position in the Senegalese Second Division and te 2010 season on place six.

== Current squad ==
Note: Flags indicate national team as defined under FIFA eligibility rules; some limited exceptions apply. Players may hold more than one non-FIFA nationality.

No.	Pos.	Nation	Player
1	GK	SEN	Babacar Mbaye
2	DF	SEN	Aliou Cisse
3	DF	SEN	Zacharia Ngom
4	DF	SEN	Moustapha Diop
5	DF	SEN	Ismaïla Dieye
6	MF	SEN	Djibril Sambou
7	MF	SEN	Cheikh Cisse
8	MF	SEN	Mamadou Niang
9	FW	CPV	João Nunes
10	MF	SEN	Abdou Seck
11	MF	SEN	Sidibouyeu Thiandoum
12	GK	SEN	Tidiane Dione
14	FW	SEN	Birame Ndoye
15	MF	SEN	Jean Armand Mendy
38	ST	SEN	Abdoulaye Daffé
16	DF	NGA	Ugochukwu K. Okafor
17	MF	GUI	Lucky Mbata

No.	Pos.	Nation	Player
18	MF	GAM	Sana Sonko
19	FW	SEN	Mamadou Ndiaye
20	MF	SEN	Abdou Bah
21	FW	SEN	Ousmane Gaye
22	DF	SEN	Pape Wade
23	DF	SEN	El Hadji Yakhya Lô
24	MF	SEN	Jean Gackou
26	FW	SEN	Dame Bamba Sow
27	MF	SEN	Mame Ndongo Diaw
28	MF	SEN	Papis Djigo
29	FW	SEN	Atoumane Dieng
30	MF	SEN	Ibrahima Conte
31	FW	SEN	Cheick Thiaw
32	MF	SEN	Mamadou Alassane Lô
36	MF	SEN	Pape Ndour
37	MF	SEN	Pape Dieng (Captain)

=== Staff ===
==== Sports ====
Head coach

- (Senegal) Babacar Fall

Goalkeeper coach

- (Senegal) Serigne Mactar Dia

Fitness coach

- (Senegal) Souleymane Diallo
- (Portugal) Elder Fontes

==== Management ====
Business manager

- (Senegal) Samba Sow

Technical director

- (Senegal) Moussa Gueye

Financial director

- (Senegal) Mountakha Ndao

== Reserve Squad ==
Note: Flags indicate national team as defined under FIFA eligibility rules; some limited exceptions apply. Players may hold more than one non-FIFA nationality.

No.	Pos.	Nation	Player
—	DF	SEN	Alfreid Ba
—	DF	SEN	Cheikh Babou
—	DF	SEN	Ibou Faye
—	MF	SEN	Mathieu Bandiaky

No.	Pos.	Nation	Player
—	MF	SEN	Souleymane Diagne
—	MF	SEN	Pape Ndiaye
—	MF	SEN	Roger Sambou
—	FW	SEN	Serigne Sow

== Notable players ==
(Guinea-Bissau)

- Idrissa Camará (Avellino)
- Casimiro (Sport Bissau e Benfica)
- Luciano Teixeira (Benfica)

(Portugal)

- Hugo Eugenio Da Silva (Sporting Braga)

(Senegal)

- Bakary Badji (FC Lorient)
- Pape Abdou Camara (Valenciennes)
- Pape Demba Camara (Sochaux)
- Alioune Badara Cissè (Espoir de Saint-Louis)
- Souleymane Diagne (Benfica)
- Mamadou Djamil Diatta (ASC Cambérène)

(Senegal)

- Mame N'dongo Diaw (CIS Marigona)
- Charles Fall
- Pape Abdou Fall (Espoir Dakar)
- Mafall Leye (Thiès F.C.)
- Ibrahima Mbaye (Inter Milan)
- Moustapha Bara Ndione (ASC Niary Tally)
- Pape Demba Ndour
- Amadou Samba Wane (ASC Linguère)
- Alioune Badara Samb (Recreativo da Caála)

(Senegal)

- Ameth Lô (A.C. Milan)

== Achievements ==
- Milk Cup (Premier): 2010

== Notable coaches ==
- (Portugal) Luis Norton De Matos (2008–2010)
- (Senegal) Oumar Diatta (2010–2011)
