= Luciano Teixeira =

Guinea-Bissauan professional footballer (born 1993)

Personal information
- Full name: Luciano Mendes Teixeira
- Date of birth: 10 October 1993 (age 33)
- Place of birth: Bissau, Guinea-Bissau
- Height: 1.88 m (6 ft 2 in)
- Position: Defensive midfielder

Team information
- Current team: Coruchense

Youth career
- 2010–2011: Étoile Lusitana
- 2012: Benfica

Senior career*
Years	Team	Apps	(Gls)
2012–2013	Benfica B	33	(0)
2013–2014	Metz	4	(0)
2014–2015	Chaves	9	(0)
2015–2016	R.F.C. Seraing	0	(0)
2018–2019	Cartaxo	17	(2)
2019–	Lusitano de Évora	0	(0)
2019–	Coruchense	11	(0)

International career^{‡}
2010–	Guinea-Bissau	6	(0)
- * Club domestic league appearances and goals as of 10:11, 4 May 2020 (UTC) ‡ National team caps and goals as of 10:03, 4 May 2020 (UTC)

Luciano Mendes Teixeira (born 10 October 1993) is a Guinea-Bissauan professional footballer who plays for as a defensive midfielder for Portuguese lower-league side Coruchense. Between 2010 and 2012, he made six appearances for the Guinea-Bissau national team.

== Club career ==
On 11 August 2012, Teixeira made his debut with Benfica B in a 2012–13 Segunda Liga match against Braga B where he played 72 minutes as a defensive midfielder and scored an own goal at 63rd minute.

He joined Metz during the summer 2013. A year later, he moved to Chaves.
