= Luís Norton de Matos =

Portuguese footballer and manager

Personal information
- Full name: Luís Maria Cabral Norton de Matos
- Date of birth: 14 December 1953 (age 72)
- Place of birth: Lisbon, Portugal
- Position: Forward

Youth career
- 1970–1971: Estoril
- 1971–1972: Benfica

Senior career*
| Years | Team | Apps | (Gls) |
| 1972–1974 | Benfica | 0 | (0) |
| 1973–1974 | → Académica (loan) | 17 | (1) |
| 1974–1976 | Estoril | 9 | (1) |
| 1976–1977 | Atlético | 28 | (6) |
| 1977–1978 | Belenenses | 29 | (3) |
| 1978–1981 | Standard Liège | 65 | (17) |
| 1981–1984 | Portimonense | 75 | (19) |
| 1984–1986 | Belenenses | 53 | (6) |
| 1986–1987 | Estrela Amadora | 24 | (3) |
| Total | | 300 | (56) |

International career
| 1982 | Portugal | 5 | (1) |

Managerial career
- 1989–1990: Atlético
- 1991–1993: Barreirense
- 1993–1995: Espinho
- 2001–2002: Espinho
- 2003–2004: Salgueiros
- 2005: Vitória Setúbal
- 2006: Vitória Guimarães
- 2008–2011: Étoile Lusitana
- 2010–2012: Guinea-Bissau
- 2012–2013: Benfica B
- 2014: Chaves
- 2015–2016: União Madeira
- 2017–2018: India U17
- 2017–2018: India U19
- 2017–2018: Indian Arrows
- * Club domestic league appearances and goals

Luís Maria Cabral Norton de Matos (born 14 December 1953) is a Portuguese former footballer who played as a forward, and a manager.

He amassed Primeira Liga totals of 211 matches and 36 goals over nine seasons, representing in the competition Académica, Estoril, Atlético, Belenenses and Portimonense. In 1989 he became a manager, going on to work with several clubs.

== Playing career ==
Born in Lisbon, Norton de Matos began playing professionally with local S.L. Benfica, but only appeared for the reserves in official games, also being loaned to Académica de Coimbra where he made his Primeira Liga debuts. Released by Benfica in the summer of 1974, he spent three of the following four years also in the top flight, with G.D. Estoril Praia, Atlético Clube de Portugal and C.F. Os Belenenses, scoring a combined ten league goals.

In 1978, Norton de Matos moved abroad and joined Standard Liège in Belgium, helping the team to the second position in the Belgian Pro League in his second season and adding the 1981 Belgian Cup. Aged nearly 28, he returned home and signed with Portimonense SC, scoring a career-best 12 goals in the 1981–82 campaign as the Algarve club finished in sixth position.

Norton de Matos retired in June 1987 at the age of 33 years and six months, after spells with Belenenses (two seasons) and C.F. Estrela da Amadora (second level). He won five caps for Portugal, all in 1982.

Luís Norton de Matos: International goals
| No. | Date | Venue | Opponent | Score | Result | Competition |
|---|---|---|---|---|---|---|
| 7 | 17 February 1982 | AWD-Arena, Hannover, West Germany | West Germany | 2–1 | 3–1 | Friendly |

== Coaching career ==
Norton de Matos started coaching in 1989, his first job being with former club Atlético in the second division. He managed mainly in that and the third levels, his only top flight experience arriving in 2005–06 with Vitória de Setúbal: on 17 December 2005, in spite of the team's excellent overall performances (nine wins and only four losses in 15 games, and just four goals conceded, best in European football that season), he resigned due to the club's dreadful economic situation; in the late 90s, he also worked as Sporting CP's director of football.

In 2008, Norton de Matos moved to Senegal, being appointed manager at Étoile Lusitana and also directing its football academy. Two years later, he was named coach of the Guinea-Bissau national team.

In the following years, Norton de Matos led S.L. Benfica B to the seventh place in the second tier in the 2012–13 season, being relegated from the top division with C.F. União in 2016. On 1 March 2017, he was appointed by the All India Football Federation to its under-17 side. He also managed Indian Arrows in the I-League until 2019.

Norton de Matos signed with French club Lille OSC on 14 July 2020, as youth system coordinator.
