= 2017 Africa Cup of Nations qualification Group H =

Football tournament qualification stage

Group H of the 2017 Africa Cup of Nations qualification tournament was one of the thirteen groups to decide the teams which qualified for the 2017 Africa Cup of Nations finals tournament. The group consisted of four teams: Ghana, Mozambique, Rwanda, and Mauritius.

The teams played against each other home-and-away in a round-robin format, between June 2015 and September 2016.

Ghana, the group winners, qualified for the 2017 Africa Cup of Nations.

== Standings ==
Pos	Team	Pld	W	D	L	GF	GA	GD	Pts	Qualification	Ghana	Mozambique	Rwanda	Mauritius
1	Ghana	6	4	2	0	14	3	+11	14	Final tournament	—	3–1	1–1	7–1
2	Mozambique	6	2	1	3	5	7	−2	7		0–0	—	0–1	1–0
3	Rwanda	6	2	1	3	9	6	+3	7		0–1	2–3	—	5–0
4	Mauritius	6	2	0	4	3	15	−12	6		0–2	1–0	1–0	—

Source: CAF
Rules for classification: Qualification tiebreakers

== Matches ==
14 June 2015
15:00 UTC+2

Mozambique	0–1	Rwanda
	Report	Sugira 4'

Estádio do Zimpeto, Maputo
Referee: Jean-Jacques Ndala (DR Congo)
14 June 2015
15:30 UTC±0

Ghana	7–1	Mauritius
Atsu 10'; J. Ayew 17', 37'; Gyan 22', 29'; Schlupp 65'; Accam 89'	Report	Sophie 31'

Accra Sports Stadium, Accra
Referee: Fidel Gomes (Guinea-Bissau)

5 September 2015
15:30 UTC+2

Rwanda	0–1	Ghana
	Report	Wakaso 87'

Amahoro Stadium, Kigali
Referee: Hagi Wiish (Somalia)
6 September 2015
15:00 UTC+4

Mauritius	1–0	Mozambique
Pithia 47'	Report

Stade George V, Curepipe
Referee: Djamal Aden (Djibouti)

24 March 2016
15:30 UTC±0

Ghana	3–1	Mozambique
Acheampong 5'; Boye 55'; J. Ayew 57'	Report	Manjate 66'

Accra Sports Stadium, Accra
Referee: Bouchaïb El Ahrach (Morocco)
26 March 2016
15:00 UTC+4

Mauritius	1–0	Rwanda
Rasolofonirina 58'	Report

Stade Anjalay, Belle Vue Maurel
Referee: Lazard Tsiba (Congo)

27 March 2016
15:00 UTC+2

Mozambique	0–0	Ghana
	Report

Estádio do Zimpeto, Maputo
Referee: Denis Batte (Uganda)
29 March 2016
15:30 UTC+2

Rwanda	5–0	Mauritius
Nshuti 11'; Sugira 30', 32'; Omborenga 73'; Mugiraneza 90'	Report

Amahoro Stadium, Kigali
Referee: Jackson Pavaza (Namibia)

4 June 2016
15:30 UTC+2

Rwanda	2–3	Mozambique
Tuyisenge 36', 77'	Report	Domingues 9', 79'; Manjate 44'

Amahoro Stadium, Kigali
Referee: Joshua Bondo (Botswana)
5 June 2016
15:00 UTC+4

Mauritius	0–2	Ghana
	Report	A. Ayew 70'; Atsu 73'

Stade Anjalay, Belle Vue Maurel
Referee: Bamlak Tessema Weyesa (Ethiopia)

3 September 2016
15:30 UTC±0

Ghana	1–1	Rwanda
Tetteh 23'	Report	Hakizimana 83'

Accra Sports Stadium, Accra
Referee: Antoine Effa (Cameroon)
3 September 2016
19:30 UTC+2

Mozambique	1–0	Mauritius
Januário 90'	Report

Estádio do Zimpeto, Maputo
Referee: El Fadil Mohamed (Sudan)

== Goalscorers ==
3 goals

- (Ghana) Jordan Ayew
- (Rwanda) Ernest Sugira

2 goals

- (Ghana) Christian Atsu
- (Ghana) Asamoah Gyan
- (Mozambique) Domingues
- (Mozambique) Apson Manjate
- (Rwanda) Jacques Tuyisenge

1 goal

- (Ghana) David Accam
- (Ghana) Frank Acheampong
- (Ghana) André Ayew
- (Ghana) John Boye
- (Ghana) Jeffrey Schlupp
- (Ghana) Samuel Tetteh
- (Ghana) Mubarak Wakaso
- (Mauritius) Fabien Pithia
- (Mauritius) Francis Rasolofonirina
- (Mauritius) Andy Sophie
- (Mozambique) Bheu António Januário
- (Rwanda) Jean-Baptiste Mugiraneza
- (Rwanda) Muhadjiri Hakizimana
- (Rwanda) Dominique Savio Nshuti
- (Rwanda) Fitina Omborenga
