= 2017 Africa Cup of Nations qualification Group E =

Football tournament qualification stage

Group E of the 2017 Africa Cup of Nations qualification tournament was one of the thirteen groups to decide the teams which qualified for the 2017 Africa Cup of Nations finals tournament. The group consisted of four teams: Zambia, Congo, Kenya, and Guinea-Bissau.

The teams played against each other home-and-away in a round-robin format, between June 2015 and September 2016.

Guinea-Bissau, the group winners, qualified for the 2017 Africa Cup of Nations.

== Standings ==
Pos	Team	Pld	W	D	L	GF	GA	GD	Pts	Qualification	Guinea-Bissau	Republic of the Congo	Zambia	Kenya
1	Guinea-Bissau	6	3	1	2	7	7	0	10	Final tournament	—	2–4	3–2	1–0
2	Congo	6	2	3	1	9	7	+2	9		1–0	—	1–1	1–1
3	Zambia	6	1	4	1	7	7	0	7		0–0	1–1	—	1–1
4	Kenya	6	1	2	3	5	7	−2	5		0–1	2–1	1–2	—

Source: CAF
Rules for classification: Qualification tiebreakers

== Matches ==
13 June 2015
15:00 UTC+2

Zambia	0–0	Guinea-Bissau
	Report

Levy Mwanawasa Stadium, Ndola
Referee: Hélder Martins de Carvalho (Angola)
14 June 2015
15:30 UTC+1

Congo	1–1	Kenya
Oniangué 35' (pen.)	Report	Were 10'

Stade Omnisport Marien Ngouabi d'Owando, Owando
Referee: Thierry Nkurunziza (Burundi)

5 September 2015
16:00 UTC±0

Guinea-Bissau	2–4	Congo
Zezinho 63'; Eridson 80'	Report	Doré 28', 31', 61', 64'

Estádio 24 de Setembro, Bissau
Referee: Aboubacar Bangoura (Guinea)
6 September 2015
16:00 UTC+3

Kenya	1–2	Zambia
Olunga 13'	Report	Kalengo 28'; Mbesuma 42'

Nyayo National Stadium, Nairobi
Referee: Mutaz Khairalla (Sudan)

23 March 2016
16:00 UTC±0

Guinea-Bissau	1–0	Kenya
Camará 18'	Report

Estádio 24 de Setembro, Bissau
Referee: Kokou Fagla (Togo)
23 March 2016
18:00 UTC+2

Zambia	1–1	Congo
Kalengo 60'	Report	Massengo 75'

Levy Mwanawasa Stadium, Ndola
Referee: Eric Otogo-Castane (Gabon)

27 March 2016
16:00 UTC+3

Kenya	0–1	Guinea-Bissau
	Report	Cícero 81'

Nyayo National Stadium, Nairobi
Referee: Norman Matemera (Zimbabwe)
27 March 2016
15:30 UTC+1

Congo	1–1	Zambia
Massengo 47'	Report	Kalengo 72'

Stade Municipal de Kintélé, Brazzaville
Referee: Malang Diedhiou (Senegal)

4 June 2016
16:00 UTC±0

Guinea-Bissau	3–2	Zambia
Zezinho 14' (pen.); Mendy 36'; Silva 90'	Report	Mbesuma 26'; Katongo 52'

Estádio 24 de Setembro, Bissau
Referee: Mehdi Abid Charef (Algeria)
5 June 2016
15:00 UTC+3

Kenya	2–1	Congo
Masika 23'; Johana 66'	Report	Oniangué 18' (pen.)

Moi International Sports Centre, Nairobi
Referee: Joseph Lamptey (Ghana)

4 September 2016
16:30 UTC+2

Zambia	1–1	Kenya
Kalaba 86'	Report	Masika 63'

Levy Mwanawasa Stadium, Ndola
Referee: Mahamadou Keita (Mali)
4 September 2016
15:30 UTC+1

Congo	1–0	Guinea-Bissau
Doré 74'	Report

Stade Municipal de Kintélé, Brazzaville
Referee: Bernard Camille (Seychelles)

== Goalscorers ==
5 goals

- (Republic of the Congo) Férébory Doré

3 goals

- (Zambia) Winston Kalengo

2 goals

- (Republic of the Congo) Jordan Massengo
- (Republic of the Congo) Prince Oniangué
- (Guinea-Bissau) Zezinho
- (Kenya) Ayub Masika
- (Zambia) Collins Mbesuma

1 goal

- (Guinea-Bissau) Idrissa Camará
- (Guinea-Bissau) Cícero
- (Guinea-Bissau) Eridson
- (Guinea-Bissau) Frédéric Mendy
- (Guinea-Bissau) Toni Silva
- (Kenya) Eric Johanna
- (Kenya) Michael Olunga
- (Kenya) Paul Were
- (Zambia) Rainford Kalaba
- (Zambia) Christopher Katongo
