= MFK Topvar Topoľčany =

Slovak football club

MFK Topoľčany
- Full name: MFK Topvar Topoľčany
- Founded: 1912; 114 years ago
- Ground: Futbalový štadión Vojtecha Schotterta, Topoľčany
- Capacity: 5,000
- Chairman: Abdelaziz Patrik Benaoudia
- Manager: Miloš Urda
- League: 3.liga west
- 2015/16: 14.position
- Website: http://www.mfktopolcany.sk
| Home colours | Away colours |

MFK Topvar Topoľčany is a Slovak football team, based in the town of Topoľčany. The club was founded in 1912. The club’s main sponsor is Topvar, a Slovak beer brewing company.

== History ==
In the 5th round of the 2015–16 Slovak Cup, Topvar were drawn with Slovak First Football League side MFK Ružomberok. Ružomberok would win the game 5–0.

== Current squad ==
Note: Flags indicate national team as defined under FIFA eligibility rules; some limited exceptions apply. Players may hold more than one non-FIFA nationality.

| No. | Pos. | Nation | Player |
|---|---|---|---|
| 1 | GK | SVK | Juraj Kochan |
| 2 | DF | SVK | Boris Rybánsky |
| 3 | DF | SVK | Erik Otrísal |
| 4 | DF | RWA | Fitina Omborenga |
| 5 | DF | RUS | Aleksandr Luzin |
| 6 | MF | SVK | Marek Slovák |
| 7 | MF | SVK | Ladislav Kučera |
| 8 | MF | RWA | Rashid Kalisa |
| 9 | FW | ARM | Vahagn Militosyan |
| 10 | MF | BEL | Edgar Mayimona |
| 23 | | SVK | Patrik Jonek |
| 22 | | SVK | Ondrej Vrábel |
| 11 | MF | SVK | Marek Švajlen |
| 13 | | SVK | Frederik Kováčik |

| No. | Pos. | Nation | Player |
|---|---|---|---|
| 14 | DF | SVK | Marko Michalík |
| 14 | DF | ALG | Younes Lauzai |
| 14 | FW | SVK | Patrik Matejov |
| 15 | MF | SVK | Michal Grman |
| 31 | FW | CMR | Agbor Kelvin |
| 16 | FW | RWA | Jean-Claude Iranzi |
| 17 | FW | BEL | David Hovsepyan |
| 18 | | SVK | Marek Pakanec |
| 18 | | SVK | Adam Arpáš |
| 19 | DF | SVK | Matúš Billik |
| 20 | FW | ALG | Mohamed Anis Lounis |
| 20 | MF | KEN | Mohamed Rama Salim |
| 21 | GK | SVK | Martin Junas |
| — | DF | GRE | Lazaros Fotias |

== Notable players ==
Had international caps for their respective countries. Players whose name is listed in bold represented their countries while playing for MFK.

Past (and present) players who are the subjects of Wikipedia articles can be found here.

- (Slovakia) Mário Breška
- (Slovakia) Peter Doležaj
- (Rwanda) **Jean-Claude Iranzi**
- (Rwanda) **Rachid Kalisa**
- (Rwanda) **Abdul Rwatubyaye**
- (Slovakia) Ladislav Jurkemik
- (Cameroon) **Agbor Kelvin**
- (Slovakia) Jozef Marko
- (Western Armenia) **Vahagn Militosyan**
- (Rwanda) **Fitina Omborenga**
- (Slovakia) Anton Švajlen
