= 2017 Africa Cup of Nations qualification Group D =

Football tournament qualification stage

Group D of the 2017 Africa Cup of Nations qualification tournament was one of the thirteen groups to decide the teams which qualified for the 2017 Africa Cup of Nations finals tournament. The group consisted of four teams: Burkina Faso, Uganda, Botswana, and Comoros.

The teams played against each other home-and-away in a round-robin format, between June 2015 and September 2016.

Burkina Faso, the group winners, qualified for the 2017 Africa Cup of Nations, while group runners-up Uganda also qualified due to being one of the two group runners-up with the best records.

== Standings ==
Pos	Team	Pld	W	D	L	GF	GA	GD	Pts	Qualification	Burkina Faso	Uganda	Botswana	Comoros
1	Burkina Faso	6	4	1	1	6	2	+4	13	Final tournament	—	1–0	2–1	2–0
2	Uganda	6	4	1	1	6	2	+4	13	Final tournament	0–0	—	2–0	1–0
3	Botswana	6	2	0	4	5	8	−3	6		1–0	1–2	—	2–1
4	Comoros	6	1	0	5	2	7	−5	3		0–1	0–1	1–0	—

Source: CAF
Rules for classification: Qualification tiebreakers

== Matches ==
13 June 2015
16:00 UTC+3

Uganda	2–0	Botswana
Massa 55'; Umony 65'	Report

Mandela National Stadium, Kampala
Referee: Israel Mujuni (Tanzania)
13 June 2015
18:00 UTC±0

Burkina Faso	2–0	Comoros
Bancé 60'; Zongo 70'	Report

Stade du 4 Août, Ouagadougou
Referee: Lazard Tsiba (Congo)

5 September 2015
15:00 UTC+3

Comoros	0–1	Uganda
	Report	Mawejje 26'

Stade Said Mohamed Cheikh, Mitsamiouli
Referee: Allister Barra (Seychelles)
5 September 2015
16:00 UTC+2

Botswana	1–0	Burkina Faso
Mogorosi 50'	Report

Francistown Stadium, Francistown
Referee: Parmendra Nunkoo (Mauritius)

24 March 2016
15:00 UTC+3

Comoros	1–0	Botswana
Ben Nabouhane 59'	Report

Stade Said Mohamed Cheikh, Mitsamiouli
Referee: Duncan Lengani (Malawi)
26 March 2016
18:00 UTC±0

Burkina Faso	1–0	Uganda
Pitroipa 60' (pen.)	Report

Stade du 4 Août, Ouagadougou
Referee: Gehad Grisha (Egypt)

27 March 2016
16:00 UTC+2

Botswana	2–1	Comoros
Moyana 48'; Mogorosi 87'	Report	M'Changama 43'

Francistown Stadium, Francistown
Referee: Joaquin Esono (Equatorial Guinea)
29 March 2016
19:00 UTC+3

Uganda	0–0	Burkina Faso
	Report

Mandela National Stadium, Kampala
Referee: Hamada Nampiandraza (Madagascar)

4 June 2016
16:00 UTC+2

Botswana	1–2	Uganda
Makgantai 50'	Report	Kizito 9'; Aucho 53'

Francistown Stadium, Francistown
Referee: Victor Gomes (South Africa)
5 June 2016
15:00 UTC+3

Comoros	0–1	Burkina Faso
	Report	S. A. Traoré 80'

Stade de Beaumer, Moroni
Referee: Louis Hakizimana (Rwanda)

4 September 2016
14:00 UTC±0

Burkina Faso	2–1	Botswana
Nakoulma 18'; Diawara 90'	Report	Sesinyi 81' (pen.)

Stade du 4 Août, Ouagadougou
Referee: Youssef Essrayri (Tunisia)
4 September 2016
17:00 UTC+3

Uganda	1–0	Comoros
Miya 36'	Report

Mandela National Stadium, Kampala
Referee: Malang Diedhiou (Senegal)

== Goalscorers ==
2 goals

- (Botswana) Joel Mogorosi

1 goal

- (Botswana) Onkabetse Makgantai
- (Botswana) Galabgwe Moyana
- (Botswana) Thabang Sesinyi
- (Burkina Faso) Aristide Bancé
- (Burkina Faso) Banou Diawara
- (Burkina Faso) Préjuce Nakoulma
- (Burkina Faso) Jonathan Pitroipa
- (Burkina Faso) Alain Traoré
- (Burkina Faso) Jonathan Zongo
- (Comoros) Youssouf M'Changama
- (Comoros) El Fardou Ben Nabouhane
- (Uganda) Khalid Aucho
- (Uganda) Luwagga Kizito
- (Uganda) Geofrey Massa
- (Uganda) Tony Mawejje
- (Uganda) Farouk Miya
- (Uganda) Brian Umony
