= Jordan Massengo =

Congolese professional footballer (born 1990)

Personal information
- Full name: Jordan Hilvy Mondesir Massengo
- Date of birth: 31 January 1990 (age 36)
- Place of birth: Saint-Mandé, France
- Height: 1.87 m (6 ft 2 in)
- Position: Defensive midfielder

Team information
- Current team: RUS Binche
- Number: 27

Senior career*
Years	Team	Apps	(Gls)
2009–2013	Istres	33	(2)
2011–2012	→ Besançon (loan)	21	(0)
2013–2014	Vannes	23	(1)
2014–2015	Mons	32	(1)
2015–2018	Union SG	74	(1)
2019–2020	RWDM47	17	(0)
2021–2022	Patro Eisden	26	(0)
2022–2023	Olympic Charleroi	26	(0)
2024–2025	La Louvière Centre	30	(4)
2025–	RUS Binche	0	(0)

International career
2015–2022	Congo	9	(2)
- * Club domestic league appearances and goals as of 16 January 2026

Jordan Hilvy Mondesir Massengo (born 31 January 1990) is a professional footballer who plays as a midfielder for RUS Binche. Born in France, he represented for the Congo national team.

== Club career ==
Massengo made his debut for Istres in the 1–1 draw away at Sedan on 2 April 2010, playing 53 minutes, before being replaced by Adel Chedli. He went on to play 22 matches for the side during the 2010–11 season, scoring the first goal of his career in the draw against Dijon on 20 August 2010, after coming on as a half-time substitute for Abdelnasser Ouadah. The following year, he was loaned out to Championnat National club Besançon, where he made 20 league appearances, before returning to Istres in the summer of 2012.

== International career ==
Massengo was called up by Congo and was an unused substitute in a 2017 Africa Cup of Nations qualifying game against Kenya in June 2015. Massengo made his debut for Congo in a 2017 Africa Cup of Nations qualification 1-1 match against Zambia, wherein he scored his first goal for the team.

=== International goals ===
Scores and results list Congo's goal tally first.

No	Date	Venue	Opponent	Score	Result	Competition
1.	23 March 2016	Levy Mwanawasa Stadium, Ndola, Zambia	Zambia	1–1	1–1	2017 Africa Cup of Nations qualification
2.	27 March 2016	Stade Alphonse Massemba-Débat, Brazzaville, Congo	Zambia	1–0	1–1	2017 Africa Cup of Nations qualification
