= Fitina Omborenga =

Rwandan professional footballer (born 1996)

Personal information
- Date of birth: 20 May 1996 (age 30)
- Place of birth: Kigali, Rwanda
- Height: 1.85 m (6 ft 1 in)
- Position: Right-back

Team information
- Current team: APR

Senior career*
Years	Team	Apps	(Gls)
2012–2016	Kiyovu		
2016–2017	Topvar Topoľčany	27	(1)
2017–	APR		

International career^{‡}
2013–	Rwanda	59	(1)
- * Club domestic league appearances and goals as of 12:20, 30 January 2019 (UTC) ‡ National team caps and goals as of 14:38, 27 March 2023 (UTC)

Fitina Omborenga (born 20 May 1996) is a Rwandan professional footballer who plays as a right-back for Rwanda Premier League club APR and the Rwanda national team.

== Club career ==
On 31 August 2017, Omborenga returned to Rwanda from Topvar Topoľčany and signed a two-year contract with APR Kigali, a deal that would keep him at the military club until the end of the 2018–19 campaign.

In late January 2019 his former manager at APR, Ljupko Petrović, recommended him to the 31 times Bulgarian champion CSKA Sofia. In the beginning of February he was to sign a contract with CSKA and to be sent on loan to Litex Lovech until the end of the season. However, after Omborenga had trialled with CSKA, the move did not materialise.

== International career ==
Scores and results list Rwanda's goal tally first, score column indicates score after each Omborenga goal.

List of international goals scored by Fitina Omborenga
No.	Date	Venue	Opponent	Score	Result	Competition
1	29 March 2016	Amahoro Stadium, Kigali, Rwanda	Mauritius	4–0	5–0	2017 Africa Cup of Nations qualification
