= Nuno Rocha (Cape Verdean footballer) =

Cape Verdean footballer

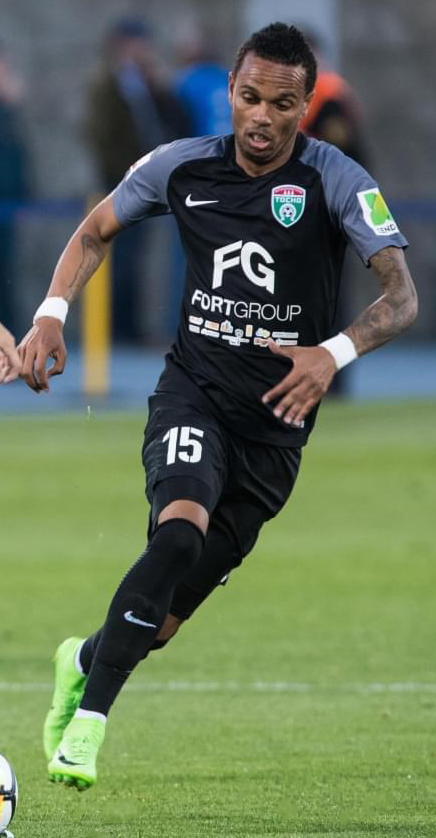
- Rocha with Tosno in 2017

Personal information
- Full name: Nuno Miguel Monteiro Rocha
- Date of birth: 25 March 1992 (age 34)
- Place of birth: Praia, Cape Verde
- Height: 1.83 m (6 ft 0 in)
- Position: Midfielder

Youth career
- 2010–2011: Marítimo

Senior career*
| Years | Team | Apps | (Gls) |
| 2011–2014 | Marítimo B | 85 | (8) |
| 2013–2014 | Marítimo | 15 | (1) |
| 2014–2017 | Universitatea Craiova | 92 | (22) |
| 2017–2018 | Tosno | 27 | (0) |
| 2018–2019 | Universitatea Craiova | 16 | (2) |
| Total | | 235 | (33) |

International career
| 2014–2019 | Cape Verde | 27 | (3) |
- * Club domestic league appearances and goals

Nuno Miguel Monteiro Rocha (born 25 March 1992) is a Cape Verdean former professional footballer who played as a midfielder.

== Club career ==
=== Marítimo ===
Born in Praia, Rocha moved to Portugal with C.S. Marítimo for his last year as a junior. He spent the vast majority of his first three senior seasons with the reserves, competing with them in both the second and third divisions.

Rocha made his Primeira Liga debut with the first team on 7 October 2013, playing the full 90 minutes in a 1–0 away loss against Vitória de Guimarães. He scored his first goal in the competition the following 16 February, the game's only at home to Vitória de Setúbal.

=== Universitatea Craiova ===
In June 2014, Rocha signed with Romanian club CS Universitatea Craiova. His maiden appearance in Liga I took place on 25 July, as he came on as a second-half substitute in a 1–1 home draw with CS Pandurii Târgu Jiu.

In the 2015–16 season, Rocha scored a career-best nine goals to help his team to finish in eighth position. His teammates included compatriots Kay and Rambé, and he was released from contract on 11 April 2017.

=== Tosno ===
On 7 June 2017, Rocha joined Russian Premier League side FC Tosno on a three-year deal. He helped them win the domestic cup in his only season, scoring the decisive penalty kick in the semi-final shootout against FC Spartak Moscow and also being featured in the decisive match against FC Avangard Kursk at the Volgograd Arena.

== International career ==
Rocha earned his first cap for Cape Verde on 6 September 2014, in a 3–1 away win over Niger for the 2015 Africa Cup of Nations qualifiers. Selected for the finals by manager Rui Águas, he took part in all three group-phase games, which ended in draw and subsequent elimination.

On 1 September 2017, Rocha scored twice to hand his team a 2–1 defeat of South Africa, their first ever win against their African counterparts.

== Career statistics ==
=== Club ===
As of 13 May 2018

Appearances and goals by club, season and competition
| Club | Season | League | | | National cup (Note: Includes Taça de Portugal, Cupa României, Russian Cup) | | Continental | | Other | | Total | |
| Club | Season | Division | Apps | Goals | Apps | Goals | Apps | Goals | Apps | Goals | Apps | Goals |
|---|---|---|---|---|---|---|---|---|---|---|---|---|
| Marítimo B | 2011–12 | Campeonato de Portugal | 29 | 4 | — | | — | | — | | 29 | 4 |
| Marítimo B | 2012–13 | LigaPro | 35 | 2 | — | | — | | — | | 35 | 2 |
| Marítimo B | 2013–14 | LigaPro | 21 | 2 | — | | — | | — | | 21 | 2 |
| Marítimo B | Total | | 85 | 8 | 0 | 0 | 0 | 0 | 0 | 0 | 85 | 8 |
| Marítimo | 2013–14 | Primeira Liga | 15 | 1 | 1 | 0 | — | | 4 (Note: Appearances in Taça da Liga) | 1 | 20 | 2 |
| Universitatea Craiova | 2014–15 | Liga I | 30 | 8 | 1 | 0 | — | | — | | 31 | 8 |
| Universitatea Craiova | 2015–16 | Liga I | 38 | 9 | 1 | 0 | — | | — | | 39 | 9 |
| Universitatea Craiova | 2016–17 | Liga I | 24 | 5 | 2 | 0 | — | | 1 (Note: Appearance in Cupa Ligii) | 0 | 27 | 5 |
| Universitatea Craiova | Total | | 92 | 22 | 4 | 0 | 0 | 0 | 1 | 0 | 97 | 22 |
| Tosno | 2017–18 | Russian Premier League | 27 | 0 | 3 | 0 | — | | — | | 30 | 0 |
| Career total | | | 219 | 31 | 8 | 0 | 0 | 0 | 5 | 1 | 232 | 32 |

=== International ===
Appearances and goals by national team and year
| National team | Year | Apps | Goals |
|---|---|---|---|
Cape Verde
| Cape Verde | 2014 | 4 | 0 |
| Cape Verde | 2015 | 10 | 1 |
| Cape Verde | 2016 | 4 | 0 |
| Cape Verde | 2017 | 4 | 2 |
| Cape Verde | 2018 | 4 | 0 |
| Cape Verde | 2019 | 1 | 0 |
| Total | | 27 | 3 |

Scores and results list Cape Verde's goal tally first, score column indicates score after each Rocha goal.

List of international goals scored by Nuno Rocha
| No. | Date | Venue | Opponent | Score | Result | Competition |
|---|---|---|---|---|---|---|
| 1 | 13 June 2015 | Várzea, Praia, Cape Verde | São Tomé and Príncipe | 2–0 | 7–1 | 2017 Africa Cup of Nations qualification |
| 2 | 1 September 2017 | Estádio Nacional, Praia, Cape Verde | South Africa | 1–1 | 2–1 | 2018 FIFA World Cup qualification |
| 3 | 1 September 2017 | Estádio Nacional, Praia, Cape Verde | South Africa | 2–1 | 2–1 | 2018 FIFA World Cup qualification |

== Honours ==
Tosno

- Russian Cup: 2017–18
