= Onkabetse Makgantai =

Motswana footballer

Personal information
- Date of birth: 1 July 1995 (age 31)
- Place of birth: Selebi-Phikwe, Botswana
- Height: 1.72 m (5 ft 8 in)
- Position: Striker

Senior career*
Years	Team	Apps	(Gls)
2013–2015	Nico United		
2016	Orapa United		
2016–2017	AS Vita Club		
2017–2018	Orapa United		
2018–2019	Baroka	16	(2)
2019–2022	Orapa United		
2022–2023	Gaborone United		
2023–2024	TAFIC Francistown		
2024–	Jwaneng Galaxy		

International career
2014–	Botswana	27	(10)
- * Club domestic league appearances and goals

Onkabetse Makgantai (born 1 July 1995) is a Motswana footballer who plays for Jwaneng Galaxy and the Botswana national football team.

He moved from Orapa United to AS Vita in 2016 to play for the DRC Super Ligue outfit.

== International career ==
Makgantai has scored ten times for Botswana, the most recent goal coming in a 2–0 win against Swaziland.

In June 2018, Makgantai won the top goalscorer prize of the 2018 COSAFA Cup after he netted five times in his side's six games.

In November 2019 he was one of four Botswana international players dropped from the national team after they had been drinking alcohol.

=== International goals ===
As of match played on 5 June 2018. Botswana score listed first; score column indicates score after each Makgantai goal.

International goals by date, venue, cap, opponent, score, result and competition
No.	Date	Venue	Cap	Opponent	Score	Result	Competition
1.	14 July 2014	Botswana National Stadium, Gaborone, Botswana	1	Lesotho	2–0	2–0	Friendly
2.	21 May 2016	Serowe Stadium, Serowe, Botswana	6	Lesotho	1–?	2–1	Friendly
3.	21 May 2016	Serowe Stadium, Serowe, Botswana	6	Lesotho	2–?	2–1	Friendly
4.	4 June 2016	Francistown Stadium, Francistown, Botswana	7	Uganda	1–1	1–2	2017 Africa Cup of Nations qualification
5.	25 June 2016	Sam Nujoma Stadium, Windhoek, Namibia	10	South Africa	1–0	2–3	2016 COSAFA Cup
6.	28 May 2018	Old Peter Mokaba Stadium, Polokwane, South Africa	15	Angola	2–0	2–1	2018 COSAFA Cup
7.	1 June 2018	Old Peter Mokaba Stadium, Polokwane, South Africa	17	Mauritius	1–0	6–0	2018 COSAFA Cup
8.	1 June 2018	Old Peter Mokaba Stadium, Polokwane, South Africa	17	Mauritius	6–0	6–0	2018 COSAFA Cup
9.	3 June 2018	Peter Mokaba Stadium, Polokwane, South Africa	18	Zimbabwe	1–1	1–1 (1–3 p)	2018 COSAFA Cup
10.	5 June 2018	Old Peter Mokaba Stadium, Polokwane, South Africa	19	Swaziland	1–0	2–0	2018 COSAFA Cup
