= Galabgwe Moyana =

Motswana footballer (born 1990)

Personal information
- Date of birth: 24 May 1990 (age 36)
- Place of birth: Gaborone, Botswana
- Position: Left winger

Team information
- Current team: Township Rollers

Senior career*
Years	Team	Apps	(Gls)
2008–2010	Notwane		
2010–2013	Mochudi Centre Chiefs		
2013–2014	Polokwane City	25	(1)
2014–2015	Mochudi Centre Chiefs		
2015–	Township Rollers		

International career^{‡}
2012–	Botswana	25	(2)
- * Club domestic league appearances and goals as of 09:49, 2 May 2018 (UTC) ‡ National team caps and goals as of 09:49, 2 May 2018 (UTC)

Galabgwe Moyana (born 24 May 1990) is a Motswana footballer who plays for Township Rollers as a left winger.

== Career ==
Born in Gaborone, Moyana has played club football for Notwane, Mochudi Centre Chiefs, Polokwane City and Township Rollers.

He made his international debut for Botswana in 2012.

=== International goals ===
Scores and results list Botswana's goal tally first.

No	Date	Venue	Opponent	Score	Result	Competition
1.	10 October 2015	Cicero Stadium, Asmara, Eritrea	Eritrea	1–0	2–0	2018 FIFA World Cup qualification
2.	27 March 2016	Francistown Stadium, Francistown, Botswana	Comoros	1–1	2–1	2017 Africa Cup of Nations qualification
