= Dominique Savio Nshuti =

Rwandan footballer

Personal information
- Full name: Dominique Savio Nshuti
- Date of birth: 1 February 1997 (age 29)
- Place of birth: Kigali, Rwanda
- Position: Midfielder

Team information
- Current team: Police
- Number: 11

International career^{‡}
Years	Team	Apps	(Gls)
2015–	Rwanda	18	(2)
- ‡ National team caps and goals as of 10:23, 19 July 2017 (UTC)

Dominique Savio Nshuti (born 1 January 1997) is a Rwandan footballer.

== International career ==
=== International goals ===
Scores and results list Rwanda's goal tally first.

No	Date	Venue	Opponent	Score	Result	Competition
1.	29 March 2016	Amahoro Stadium, Kigali, Rwanda	Mauritius	1–0	5–0	2017 Africa Cup of Nations qualification
2.	15 July 2017	CCM Kirumba Stadium, Mwanza, Tanzania	Tanzania	1–0	1–1	2018 African Nations Championship qualification
