= Kay (footballer) =

Cape Verdean footballer (born 1988)

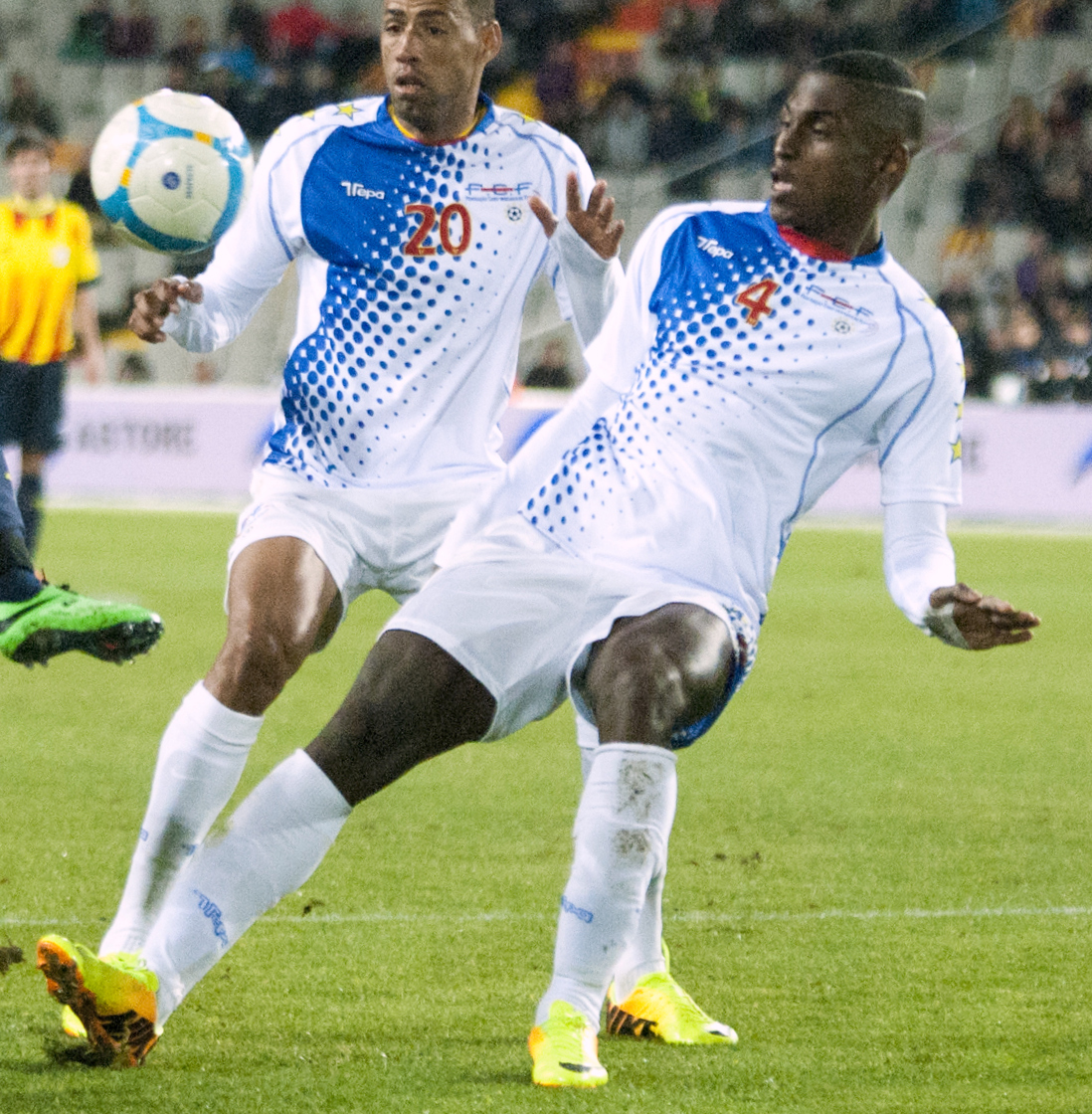
- Kay playing for Cape Verde in 2013

Personal information
- Full name: Carlos Daniel Silveira da Graça
- Date of birth: 5 January 1988 (age 38)
- Place of birth: Nossa Senhora da Luz, Cape Verde
- Height: 1.84 m (6 ft 0 in)
- Position: Centre back

Youth career
- 1999: Batuque
- 2000: Coritia
- 2000–2005: Benfica
- 2005–2007: Académica

Senior career*
Years	Team	Apps	(Gls)
2007–2008	Tourizense	2	(0)
2008–2009	Tabuense		
2009	Tourizense	2	(0)
2010	Aljustrelense	17	(0)
2010–2012	Operário	55	(8)
2012–2014	Belenenses	46	(5)
2014–2017	Universitatea Craiova	49	(2)
2017–2018	Omonia	0	(0)
2018–2019	Senica	20	(4)
2019–2020	Universitatea Cluj	13	(3)
2021	Académica	1	(0)

International career
2013–2016	Cape Verde	13	(1)
- * Club domestic league appearances and goals

Carlos Daniel Silveira da Graça (born 5 January 1988), known as Kay, is a Cape Verdean former professional footballer who played as a centre back.

== Club career ==
=== Portugal ===
Born in Nossa Senhora da Luz (São Vicente), Kay spent the first seven years of his senior career in Portugal, also playing youth football in the country with S.L. Benfica and Académica de Coimbra. He competed in lower league or amateur football until the age of 24, representing G.D. Tourizense, Grupo Desportivo Tabuense, S.C. Mineiro Aljustrelense and CD Operário.

In early 2012, Kay agreed to a contract with Segunda Liga club C.F. Belenenses effective as of 1 July. He contributed with 35 games and five goals in his first season, helping to a return to the Primeira Liga after a three-year absence.

Kay made his debut in the Portuguese top division on 26 August 2013, playing the full 90 minutes in a 1–2 away loss against S.C. Braga.

=== Universitatea Craiova ===
In June 2014, Kay signed with CS Universitatea Craiova in the Romanian Liga I. His maiden appearance in the competition took place on 25 July, in a 1–1 home draw against CS Pandurii Târgu Jiu.

In the 2015–16 season, Kay scored once in 21 matches to help his team finish in eighth position. His teammates included countrymen Rambé and Nuno Rocha, and he was released from contract on 1 April 2017.

=== Later years ===
On 26 June 2017, Kay joined AC Omonia on a two-year deal. On 9 July 2019, he moved to Liga II club FC Universitatea Cluj from FK Senica of the Slovak Super Liga.

== International career ==
Kay earned his first cap for Cape Verde on 8 June 2013, in a 2–1 home win over Equatorial Guinea for the 2014 FIFA World Cup qualifiers (later awarded 3–0). Selected for the 2015 Africa Cup of Nations finals by manager Rui Águas, he was an unused squad member in an eventual group stage exit.

Kay scored his first goal for the Blue Sharks on 6 September 2015, helping to a 2–1 success in Libya for the 2017 Africa Cup of Nations qualifying phase.

== Career statistics ==
=== International ===
Appearances and goals by national team and year
National team	Year	Apps	Goals
Cape Verde
Cape Verde	2013	3	0
Cape Verde	2014	3	0
Cape Verde	2015	4	1
Cape Verde	2016	3	0
Total		13	1

Scores and results list Cape Verde's goal tally first, score column indicates score after each Kay goal.

List of international goals scored by Kay
No.	Date	Venue	Opponent	Score	Result	Competition
1	6 September 2015	Petro Sport, New Cairo, Egypt	Libya	1–0	2–1	2017 Africa Cup of Nations qualification
