= Tokelo Rantie =

South African soccer player (born 1990)

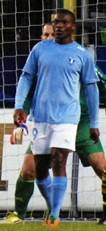

Personal information
- Full name: Tokelo Anthony Rantie
- Date of birth: 8 September 1990 (age 36)
- Place of birth: Parys, South Africa
- Height: 1.72 m (5 ft 8 in)
- Position: Forward

Youth career
- 1997–2005: Dangerous Darkies
- 2006–2009: Stars of Africa Academy

Senior career*
Years	Team	Apps	(Gls)
2009–2013	Stars of Africa Academy		
2010	→ Ferroviário de Beira (loan)		
2011	→ CD Maxaquene (loan)		
2011	→ IFK Hässleholm (loan)	12	(10)
2011–2012	→ Orlando Pirates (loan)	20	(7)
2012–2013	→ Malmö FF (loan)	15	(5)
2013	Malmö FF	17	(5)
2013–2016	Bournemouth	44	(5)
2016–2018	Gençlerbirliği	26	(3)
2018	Cape Town City	0	(0)
2019–2020	Mamelodi Sundowns	0	(0)
2021	Tshakhuma Tsha Madzivhandila	6	(0)

International career^{‡}
2012–2017	South Africa	41	(13)
- * Club domestic league appearances and goals as of 19 August 2024 ‡ National team caps and goals as of 3 September 2017

Tokelo Anthony Rantie (born 8 September 1990) is a former South African professional soccer player who played as a striker for the South Africa national team.

== Club career ==
=== Early career ===
Born in Parys, Free State, Rantie started his career in different academies, most notably the Stars of Africa Academy in his native South Africa. Gabestar was his mentor. He proceeded to move to Ferroviário de Beira in 2010 and later CD Maxaquene in neighbouring Mozambique. In 2011, he moved to Swedish Division 2 side IFK Hässleholm on a loan deal from Stars of Africa Academy as part of their co-operation to bring South African players to Sweden.

=== Orlando Pirates ===
As Rantie had scored 10 goals in 12 games after half of the season he was loaned out to Orlando Pirates in the Premier Soccer League for the 2011–2012 season. He scored 7 chips in 20 games for the pirates. The club tried to convince Stars of Africa Academy to complete a full transfer but failed after the club's demands had been too high.

=== Malmö FF ===
On 9 August 2012, Allsvenskan club Malmö FF confirmed via their Twitter account that Rantie was joining the club. The transfer was a 17-month loan deal scheduled to end on 1 January 2014 with an option for Malmö to buy Rantie at a set price, the price was not disclosed. Rantie made his debut for the club on 16 August 2012 when he played 45 minutes in a friendly against Italian side Lazio. Rantie proceeded to score a hat-trick in his competitive debut for the club on 20 August 2012 when Malmö FF played Sandvikens IF away from home in the second round of Svenska Cupen, Malmö won the match 6–3 after extra time. On 27 August 2012 Rantie made his first league appearance for Malmö FF when he came into the game from the bench in the 62nd minute against GIF Sundsvall. Rantie later scored his first league goal for the club in the 89th minute, affirming the result 2–0 for his new club. Overall Rantie played 11 league matches and scored three league goals for Malmö FF during the 2012 season.

Rantie started the 2013 season with a knee injury which meant that he was out for the majority of the pre-season. He managed to score a spectacular goal in the first league match, a home fixture against Halmstads BK, when he managed to dribble past several defenders before scoring the first goal of the game and his first of the season via the crossbar. On 23 April 2013 Rantie signed a four-year contract until the end of the 2016 season to make him a permanent Malmö FF player. In total Rantie played 21 matches and scored seven goals for the club during the league title winning season. He was given permission by Bournemouth to return to the club for a couple of days in November 2013 to celebrate the title with the players and fans of Malmö FF.

=== AFC Bournemouth ===
Malmö FF confirmed on 28 August 2013 that they had sold Rantie to English club Bournemouth. The transfer fee was undisclosed but was reported to be a Bournemouth club record fee of £2.5 million. Rantie made his début on 17 September, replacing Scottish winger Ryan Fraser in a 1–0 win against Barnsley at the Goldsands Stadium. He made his first start for the club four days later in a 3–3 draw against Middlesbrough, lining up alongside strike partner Lewis Grabban before being replaced by Wes Thomas after 60 minutes. His first goal for the club came on 9 November, as he opened the scoring in a 1–1 draw against Burnley at Turf Moor, before Danny Ings scored late on to level the match. His second goal for the club came in January 2014, scoring the winning goal as Bournemouth beat Huddersfield Town 2–1. Rantie struggled to break into the starting eleven with Bournemouth top scorer Lewis Grabban and January signing Yann Kermorgant from Charlton Athletic being preferred by manager Eddie Howe. However, despite this, with the departure of Grabban to Norwich this summer for an estimated sum of £3,000,000 after his release clause from the new contract he signed just 6 months earlier was triggered, and a strong performance in the last game of the season in a 1–0 defeat away to Millwall by the South African.

=== Gençlerbirliği ===
On 26 August 2016, Bournemouth announced on their official website that Rantie had signed a permanent deal with Turkish side Gençlerbirliği for an undisclosed fee.

=== Mamelodi Sundowns ===
On 10 September 2019, Rantie signed a 3-year contract with Mamelodi Sundowns. His contract was terminated on 5 January 2020 and he has never played since.

== International career ==
Rantie made his senior national team debut for the South Africa national soccer team on 15 June 2012 in a friendly game against Gabon, scoring his first goal for Bafana Bafana in the process. In 2013 Rantie was picked for his first tournament with South Africa when he was selected as part of the 23 men squad for the 2013 Africa Cup of Nations held in South Africa.

== Career statistics ==
=== Club ===
As of 17 August 2015.

Club	Season	League		Cup		Continental		Total	
Club	Season	Apps	Goals	Apps	Goals	Apps	Goals	Apps	Goals
Ferroviário da Beira	2010	—		—		—		—	
Ferroviário da Beira	Total	—		—		—		—	
CD Maxaquene	2011	—		—		—		—	
CD Maxaquene	Total	—		—		—		—	
IFK Hässleholm (loan)	2011	12	10	0	0	—		12	10
IFK Hässleholm (loan)	Total	12	10	0	0	—		12	10
Orlando Pirates	2011–12	20	7	0	0	0	0	20	7
Orlando Pirates	Total	20	7	0	0	0	0	20	7
Malmö FF (loan)	2012	11	3	1	3	—		12	6
Malmö FF	2013	21	7	2	2	6	1	29	10
Malmö FF	Total	32	10	3	5	6	1	41	16
Bournemouth	2013–14	29	3	2	0	—		31	3
Bournemouth	2014–15	12	2	4	0	—		16	2
Bournemouth	2015–16	1	0	0	0	—		1	0
Bournemouth	Total	41	5	6	0	—		47	5
Career total		96	31	9	5	6	1	111	37

=== International ===
Updated 3 September 2017.

National team	Year	Apps	Goals
South Africa	2012	4	2
South Africa	2013	12	3
South Africa	2014	9	4
South Africa	2015	10	1
South Africa	2016	3	1
South Africa	2017	2	2
Total		40	12

==== International goals ====
Scores and results list South Africa's goal tally first.

Goal	Date	Venue	Opponent	Score	Result	Competition
1.	15 June 2012	Mbombela Stadium, Nelspruit, South Africa	Gabon	2–0	3–0	Friendly
2.	16 October 2012	Nyayo National Stadium, Nairobi, Kenya	Kenya	1–0	2–1	Friendly
3.	2 February 2013	Moses Mabhida Stadium, Durban, South Africa	Mali	1–0	1–1	2013 Africa Cup of Nations
4.	11 October 2013	Stade d'Agadir, Agadir, Morocco	Morocco	1–0	1–1	Friendly
5.	11 October 2014	Stade Municipal, Pointe-Noire, Congo	Congo	2–0	2–0	2015 Africa Cup of Nations qualification
6.	15 November 2014	Moses Mabhida Stadium, Durban, South Africa	Sudan	2–0	2–1	2015 Africa Cup of Nations qualification
7.	19 November 2014	Godswill Akpabio International Stadium, Uyo, Nigeria	Nigeria	1–0	2–2	2015 Africa Cup of Nations qualification
8.	19 November 2014	Godswill Akpabio International Stadium, Uyo, Nigeria	Nigeria	2–0	2–2	2015 Africa Cup of Nations qualification
9.	13 November 2015	Estádio Nacional de Ombaka, Benguela, Angolla	Angola	1–1	3–1	2018 FIFA World Cup qualification
10.	26 March 2016	Limbe Stadium, Limbe, Cameroon	Cameroon	1–0	2–2	2017 Africa Cup of Nations qualification
11.	10 June 2017	Godswill Akpabio International Stadium, Uyo, Nigeria	Nigeria	1–0	2–0	2019 Africa Cup of Nations qualification
12.	1 September 2017	Estádio Nacional de Cabo Verde, Praia, Cape Verde	Cape Verde	1–0	1–2	2018 FIFA World Cup qualification

== Honours ==
Orlando Pirates

- Premier Soccer League: 2011–12
- Telkom Knockout: 2011–12

Malmö FF

- Allsvenskan: 2013

Bournemouth

- Football League Championship: 2014–15
