= Idrissa Camará =

Bissau-Guinean footballer

Personal information
- Date of birth: 20 July 1993 (age 33)
- Place of birth: Bissau, Guinea-Bissau
- Height: 1.77 m (5 ft 9 1/2 in)
- Position: Winger

Team information
- Current team: Santa Croce

Senior career*
Years	Team	Apps	(Gls)
2010	Étoile Lusitana		
2011–2012	Chaves		
2012–2014	Visé	53	(1)
2014–2016	Correggese	41	(8)
2016–2018	Avellino	25	(0)
2018	→ Akragas (loan)	14	(0)
2018–2019	Varese	22	(6)
2019–2020	Agropoli	14	(2)
2020	Luparense	9	(1)
2020–2021	Vigasio	6	(0)
2021	Giugliano	18	(0)
2021–2022	Vigasio	22	(3)
2022–2023	Mazara	?	(4)
2023–	Santa Croce		

International career^{‡}
2010–2017	Guinea-Bissau	6	(1)
- * Club domestic league appearances and goals as of 20 October 2019 ‡ National team caps and goals as of 15:12, 20 March 2018 (UTC)

Idrissa Camará (born 20 July 1993) is a Bissau-Guinean international footballer who plays for Italian club Santa Croce, as a winger.

== Club career ==
Born in Bissau, Camará has played club football for Étoile Lusitana, Chaves, Visé and Correggese. On 1 July 2016 he signed for Serie B team Avellino. In January 2018 he moved on loan to Akragas.

In July 2022, he signed for Eccellenza Sicily club Mazara.

He left Mazara by the end of the season, and in August 2023 he signed for fellow Eccellenza Sicily club Santa Croce.

== International career ==
He made his international debut for Guinea-Bissau in 2010.

=== International goals ===
Scores and results list Guinea-Bissau's goal tally first.

No	Date	Venue	Opponent	Score	Result	Competition
1.	23 March 2016	Estádio 24 de Setembro, Bissau, Guinea-Bissau	Kenya	1–0	1–0	2017 Africa Cup of Nations qualification
