= Faduley =

Association football player

Personal information
- Full name: Faduley Rodrigues Sousa Baía
- Date of birth: 10 March 1992 (age 34)
- Place of birth: São Tomé, São Tomé and Príncipe
- Height: 1.85 m (6 ft 1 in)
- Position: Forward

Team information
- Current team: Castrense

Youth career
- 2004–2010: Belenenses
- 2010–2011: Vitória de Setúbal

Senior career*
Years	Team	Apps	(Gls)
2011	Vila Meã	4	(0)
2012	União Montemor	4	(0)
2013	Cesarense	13	(2)
2013–2014	Vitória Sernache	18	(7)
2014	Gouveia	3	(0)
2015	Prainha	10	(0)
2015–	Castrense	26	(1)

International career^{‡}
2016–	São Tomé and Príncipe	1	(1)
- * Club domestic league appearances and goals ‡ National team caps and goals as of 4 June 2016

Faduley Rodrigues Sousa Baía (born 10 March 1992), simply known as Faduley, is a São Toméan footballer who plays as a forward for Portuguese club Castrense and the São Tomé and Príncipe national team. He also holds Portuguese citizenship.

== International career ==
Faduley made his international debut on 4 June 2016, when he entered as a 74th-minute substitute in a loss Africa Cup of Nations qualifier against Cape Verde.

=== International goals ===
No.	Date	Venue	Opponent	Score	Result	Competition	Ref.
1.	4 June 2016	Estádio Nacional 12 de Julho, São Tomé, São Tomé and Príncipe	Cape Verde	1–2	1–2	2017 Africa Cup of Nations qualification	
