= Gizzie Dorbor =

Liberian footballer (born 1987)

Personal information
- Full name: Gizzie Tuncan Dorbor
- Date of birth: 28 February 1987 (age 39)
- Place of birth: Monrovia, Liberia
- Height: 1.77 m (5 ft 9 1/2 in)
- Position: Defender

Team information
- Current team: Hapoel Beit She'an

Senior career*
Years	Team	Apps	(Gls)
2003–2004	Karn United		
2005–2006	LISCR		
2007	Mighty Barolle		
2008–2009	LISCR		
2009	Ironi Bat Yam	31	(0)
2010–2011	Hapoel Herzliya	54	(1)
2012–2013	Hapoel Kfar Saba	35	(2)
2013–2021	Hapoel Afula	230	(3)
2021–2023	Tzeirei Kafr Kanna	56	(0)
2023–2024	Hapoel Kafr Kanna	24	(3)
2024–	Hapoel Beit She'an	0	(0)

International career
2005–2016	Liberia	13	(1)
- * Club domestic league appearances and goals as of 1 June 2024

Gizzie Dorbor (born 28 February 1987) is a Liberian footballer who plays as a defender for Hapoel Beit She'an. Born in Liberia, he has represented the Liberia national team internationally.

== Personal life ==
He also holds Israeli citizenship, which he received in August 2017.

== International career ==
He made his international debut in 2005 against Mali in Bamako when Liberia lost 4–1 in a FIFA World Cup Qualifier.

=== International goals ===
Scores and results list Liberia's goal tally first.

No	Date	Venue	Opponent	Score	Result	Competition
1.	5 June 2016	Antoinette Tubman Stadium, Monrovia, Liberia	Togo	1–0	2–2	2017 Africa Cup of Nations qualification
