= Eridson =

Guinea-Bissauan footballer (born 1990)

Personal information
- Full name: Eridson Mendes Umpeça
- Date of birth: 25 June 1990 (age 36)
- Place of birth: Bissau, Guinea-Bissau
- Height: 1.87 m (6 ft 2 in)
- Position: Defender

Team information
- Current team: Cesarense

Youth career
- 2007–2009: Porto

Senior career*
Years	Team	Apps	(Gls)
2009–2011	Tourizense	48	(0)
2011–2014	Paços Ferreira	6	(0)
2011–2012	→ Portimonense (loan)	11	(2)
2012–2013	→ Belenenses (loan)	4	(0)
2013–2014	→ Atlético (loan)	23	(0)
2014–2015	Académico de Viseu	35	(1)
2015–2017	Freamunde	30	(0)
2017	Foresta Suceava	2	(0)
2017–2018	C.D. Cinfães	0	(0)
2018–2019	Varzim B	5	(0)
2019	AD Oliveirense	14	(0)
2019–2020	Valadares Gaia	14	(1)
2020–2023	SC Coimbrões	57	(5)
2023–	Cesarense		

International career
2011–2016	Guinea-Bissau	16	(1)
- * Club domestic league appearances and goals as of 1 July 2023

Eridson (born 25 June 1990) is a Bissau-Guinean professional footballer who plays as a defender for Cesarense.

== Career ==
În 2017 Eridson joined Romanian club Foresta Suceava.

== Career statistics ==
Scores and results list Guinea-Bissau's goal tally first.

No	Date	Venue	Opponent	Score	Result	Competition
1.	5 September 2015	Estádio 24 de Setembro, Bissau, Guinea-Bissau	Congo	2–4	2–4	2017 Africa Cup of Nations qualification
