= Komlan Agbégniadan =

Togolese footballer

Personal information
- Date of birth: 26 March 1991 (age 35)
- Place of birth: Lomé, Togo
- Height: 1.67 m (5 ft 6 in)
- Position: Midfielder

Team information
- Current team: Olympia Kirrlach

Youth career
- 2009–2010: US Masséda

Senior career*
Years	Team	Apps	(Gls)
2011–2012	Espoir de Tsévié		
2012–2013	Stade Migovéen		
2014–2016	Togo-Port		
2016–2017	West African FA	38	(13)
2017–2018	ASEC Mimosas		
2018–2019	Blau-Weiß Mintard	10	(7)
2019–2020	ASEC Mimosas		
2020–2021	Blau-Weiß Mintard	7	(2)
2021–2022	1. FC Bruchsal	16	(2)
2022–	Olympia Kirrlach	63	(24)

International career
2015–2018	Togo	16	(3)
- * Club domestic league appearances and goals as of 1 July 2024

Komlan Agbégniadan (also known as Platini) is a Togolese footballer who plays as a midfielder for German club Olympia Kirrlach.

== Club career ==
Agbégniadan has previously played for Ghanaian Premier League side WAFA from 15 May 2016, after he had been with Togolese Championnat National side AS Togo-Port.

He has spoken of his dreams of playing for major European clubs and participating in major international football competitions, for his country Togo.

In 2023 he played for German club Olympia Kirrlach in the seventh-tier Landesliga.

== International career ==
Agbégniadan was a member of the Togo national team at the 2017 Africa Cup of Nations.

== Career statistics ==
Scores and results list Togo's goal tally first.

No	Date	Venue	Opponent	Score	Result	Competition
1.	4 September 2016	Stade de Kégué, Lomé, Togo	Djibouti	4–0	5–0	2017 Africa Cup of Nations qualification
2.	4 September 2016	Stade de Kégué, Lomé, Togo	Djibouti	5–0	5–0	2017 Africa Cup of Nations qualification
3.	11 November 2016	Stade El Menzah, Tunis, Tunisia	Comoros	2–2	2–2	Friendly
