= Aly Abeid =

Mauritanian footballer (born 1997)

Personal information
- Full name: Yacoub Aly Abeid
- Date of birth: 11 December 1997 (age 28)
- Place of birth: Arafat, Mauritania
- Height: 1.74 m (5 ft 9 in)
- Position: Left-back

Team information
- Current team: JS Kabylie
- Number: 13

Youth career
- –2014: ASAC Concorde
- 2014–2016: Levante

Senior career*
Years	Team	Apps	(Gls)
2016–2018	Levante B	41	(1)
2018–2020	Levante	1	(0)
2018–2019	→ Alcorcón (loan)	12	(0)
2020–2022	Valenciennes	44	(0)
2022–2024	UTA Arad	40	(1)
2024–2026	CFR Cluj	61	(0)
2026–	JS Kabylie	2	(0)

International career^{‡}
2015–	Mauritania	78	(4)
- * Club domestic league appearances and goals as of 15:10, 7 November 2026 (UTC) ‡ National team caps and goals as of 13 November 2026

Yacoub Aly Abeid (Arabic: يعقوب علي عبيد; Tamazight: ⵢⴰⴽⵓⴱ ⴰⵍⵢ ⴰⴱⴻⵉⴷ; born 11 December 1997) is a Mauritanian professional footballer who plays as a left-back for Algerian Ligue Professionnelle 1 club JS Kabylie and the Mauritania national team, which he captains.

== Club career ==
Aly Abeid and compatriot Moctar Sidi El Hacen were signed by Spanish club Levante UD in 2014 after impressing in a nearby tournament, but could not play competitively for the team until the age of 18 due to FIFA regulations. He began to play for the reserve team in Segunda División B and Tercera División.

On 15 April 2018 among a crisis of injuries and suspensions in the Valencian club, Aly Abeid made his debut as a starter for the first team in La Liga, in a 3–0 loss at Atlético Madrid. He was praised by Marca for his performance. Aly Abeid was loaned to AD Alcorcón of Segunda División on 16 July 2018 for a season, and was registered with their second team in the fourth tier.

On 23 January 2020, Abeid officially joined French Ligue 2 club Valenciennes FC, signing a deal until June 2022.

On 29 June 2022, Abeid signed with UTA Arad in Romania.

On 13 February 2024, Abeid signed with CFR Cluj in Romania.

On 31 August 2026, he joined JS Kabylie, signing a two-year contract with the Kabyle club.

== International career ==
He played for the national team at the African Cup of Nations 2019, the first international tournament of the team.

== Career statistics ==
=== Club ===
As of 7 November 2026

Appearances and goals by club, season and competition
Club	Season	League			National cup (Note: Includes Coupe de France, Cupa României)		Europe		Other		Total	
Club	Season	Division	Apps	Goals	Apps	Goals	Apps	Goals	Apps	Goals	Apps	Goals
Levante B	2016–17	Segunda División B	14	0	—		—		—		14	0
Levante B	2017–18	Tercera División	27	1	—		—		5 (Note: Appearances in Tercera División promotion play-offs)	0	32	1
Levante B	Total		41	1	—		—		5	0	46	1
Levante	2017–18	La Liga	1	0	0	0	—		—		1	0
Valenciennes	2019–20	Ligue 2	5	0	—		—		—		5	0
Valenciennes	2020–21	Ligue 2	25	0	3	0	—		—		28	0
Valenciennes	2021–22	Ligue 2	14	0	0	0	—		—		14	0
Valenciennes	Total		44	0	3	0	—		—		47	0
UTA Arad	2022–23	Liga I	21	1	1	0	—		2 (Note: Appearances in Liga I promotion/relegation play-offs)	0	24	1
UTA Arad	2023–24	Liga I	19	0	3	0	—		—		22	0
UTA Arad	Total		40	1	4	0	—		2	0	46	1
CFR Cluj	2023–24	Liga I	9	0	0	0	—		—		24	1
CFR Cluj	2024–25	Liga I	23	0	5	2	1 (Note: Appearances in UEFA Conference League)	0	—		29	2
CFR Cluj	2025–26	Liga I	24	0	3	0	5 (Note: One appearance in UEFA Europa League, four appearances in UEFA Conference League)	0	1 (Note: Appearance in Supercupa României)	0	33	0
CFR Cluj	2026–27	Liga I	6	0	—		4	0	—		10	0
CFR Cluj	Total		61	0	8	2	10	0	1	0	80	2
JS Kabylie	2026–27	Algerian Ligue Professionnelle 1	2	0	0	0	—		—		2	0
Career Total			189	2	15	2	10	0	8	0	222	4

=== International ===
As of match played 13 November 2026

Appearances and goals by national team and year
National team	Year	Apps	Goals
Mauritania
Mauritania	2015	11	2
Mauritania	2016	4	0
Mauritania	2017	6	0
Mauritania	2018	5	0
Mauritania	2019	8	0
Mauritania	2020	2	0
Mauritania	2021	7	0
Mauritania	2022	10	0
Mauritania	2023	6	1
Mauritania	2024	8	0
Mauritania	2025	6	1
Mauritania	2026	5	0
Total		78	4

Scores and results list Mauritania's goal tally first, score column indicates score after each Abeid goal.

List of international goals scored by Aly Abeid
No.	Date	Venue	Opponent	Score	Result	Competition
1	21 June 2015	Stade Olympique, Nouakchott, Mauritania	Sierra Leone	1–0	2–1	2016 African Nations Championship qualification
2	5 September 2015	Stade Olympique, Nouakchott, Mauritania	South Africa	1–0	3–1	2017 Africa Cup of Nations qualification
3	24 March 2023	Stade TP Mazembe, Lubumbashi, Democratic Republic of the Congo	DR Congo	1–2	1–3	2023 Africa Cup of Nations qualification
4	5 September 2025	Nouadhibou Municipal Stadium, Nouadhibou, Mauritania	Togo	2–0	2–0	2026 FIFA World Cup qualification

== Honours ==
Levante B

- Tercera División: 2017–18

CFR Cluj

- Cupa României: 2024–25
- Supercupa României runner-up: 2025
