= Sadat Ouro-Akoriko =

Togolese footballer

Personal information
- Date of birth: 1 February 1988 (age 38)
- Place of birth: Sokodé, Togo
- Position: Centre-back

Senior career*
Years	Team	Apps	(Gls)
2009–2010	Étoile Filante		
2011–2014	Free State Stars	76	(5)
2014–2015	AmaZulu	13	(1)
2015–2016	Al-Faisaly	23	(1)
2016	Al-Khaleej	5	(0)
2017–2019	Amazulu	33	(2)
2019–2020	Kazma SC		
2020–2021	ASKO Kara		

International career
2009–2018	Togo	38	(1)
- * Club domestic league appearances and goals

Sadat Ouro-Akoriko (born 1 February 1988) is a Togolese former professional footballer who played as a centre-back. At international level, he made 38 appearances for the Togo national team, scoring once.

== Club career ==
Ouro-Akoriko has played club football in Togo and South Africa for Étoile Filante de Lomé, Free State Stars and AmaZulu. On 29 August 2015, he signed a contract for Saudi club Al-Faisaly.

In September 2016, he signed a deal with Al-Khaleej on free transfer after his contract with Al-Faisaly had expired.

In June 2017, he rejoined AmaZulu. He left AmaZulu at the end of his contract in the summer of 2019 and joined Kuwaiti club Kazma SC in September 2019.

== International career ==
Ouro-Akoriko made his international debut for Togo in 2010, and appeared in FIFA World Cup qualifying matches for them.

== Career statistics ==
Scores and results list Togo's goal tally first.

No	Date	Venue	Opponent	Score	Result	Competition
1.	14 June 2015	Stade de Kégué, Lomé, Togo	Liberia	1–1	2–1	2017 Africa Cup of Nations qualification
