= Bessam =

Mauritanian footballer

Personal information
- Full name: Cheikh El Khalil Moulaye Ahmed
- Date of birth: 4 December 1987 (age 38)
- Place of birth: Zouérat, Mauritania
- Height: 1.80 m (5 ft 11 in)
- Position: Forward

Team information
- Current team: FC Nouadhibou

Senior career*
| Years | Team | Apps | (Gls) |
| 2013–2014 | ACS Ksar | | |
| 2014–2015 | JS Kabylie | 14 | (2) |
| 2015–2016 | CS Constantine | 29 | (3) |
| 2016–2017 | Al-Ansar | 1 | (0) |
| 2017–2018 | Al-Ahly Tripoli | | |
| 2018 | FC Nouadhibou | | |
| 2018–2019 | AS Gabès | 1 | (1) |
| 2019–2020 | Al-Khaleej | | |
| 2020– | FC Nouadhibou | | |

International career^{‡}
| 2013–2021 | Mauritania | 59 | (12) |
- * Club domestic league appearances and goals ‡ National team caps and goals as of 7 December 2021

Cheikh El Khalil Moulaye Ahmed (Arabic: شيخ مولاي أحمد; born 4 December 1987), more commonly known as Bessam, is a Mauritanian professional footballer who most recently played for FC Nouadhibou. He also plays for the Mauritania national team.

== Club career ==
=== ACS Ksar ===
Bessam started his career with the club ASC Ksar until he was called to represent the national team by the "then" coach Patrice Neveu. He scored on his first game with the national team, and made an assist in the 2–0 win over Senegal that Qualified the Mauritanian team to the 2014 African Nations Championship in South Africa.

=== JS Kabylie ===
In May 2014, Bessam signed a two-year contract with Algerian club JS Kabylie. On 16 August he made his JS Kabylie debut, away to MC Oran, scoring the second goal in a 2–0 victory. He scored the first goal for Mauritania in a 2–0 victory over Senegal.

== International career ==
Bessam started his successful national career by helping his country to qualify to the 2014 African Nations Championship in South Africa where they were disqualified from the groups stage.

=== International goals ===
Scores and results list Mauritania's goal tally first.

| Goal | Date | Venue | Opponent | Score | Result | Competition |
|---|---|---|---|---|---|---|
| 1. | 20 July 2013 | Stade Olympique, Nouakchott, Mauritania | Senegal | 1–0 | 2–0 | 2014 African Nations Championship qualification |
| 2. | 5 January 2014 | Tuks Stadium, Pretoria, South Africa | Mozambique | ? | 3–2 | Friendly |
| 3. | 5 January 2014 | Tuks Stadium, Pretoria, South Africa | Mozambique | ? | 3–2 | Friendly |
| 4. | 22 January 2014 | Free State Stadium, Bloemfontein, South Africa | Gabon | 1–0 | 2–4 | 2014 African Nations Championship |
| 5. | 22 January 2014 | Free State Stadium, Bloemfontein, South Africa | Gabon | 2–1 | 2–4 | 2014 African Nations Championship |
| 6. | 20 April 2014 | Stade George V, Curepipe, Mauritius | Mauritius | 2–0 | 2–0 | 2015 Africa Cup of Nations qualification |
| 7. | 5 September 2015 | Stade Olympique, Nouakchott, Mauritania | South Africa | 3–1 | 3–1 | 2017 Africa Cup of Nations qualification |
| 8. | 13 October 2015 | Stade Olympique, Nouakchott, Mauritania | South Sudan | 1–0 | 4–0 | 2018 FIFA World Cup qualification |
| 9. | 17 November 2015 | Stade Olympique de Radès, Radès, Tunisia | Tunisia | 1–1 | 1–2 | 2018 FIFA World Cup qualification |
| 10. | 25 March 2016 | Stade Olympique, Nouakchott, Mauritania | Gambia | 1–0 | 2–1 | 2017 Africa Cup of Nations qualification |
| 11. | 25 March 2016 | Stade Olympique, Nouakchott, Mauritania | Gambia | 2–1 | 2–1 | 2017 Africa Cup of Nations qualification |
| 12. | 24 March 2017 | Stade Olympique, Nouakchott, Mauritania | Benin | 1–0 | 1–0 | Friendly |
| 13. | 30 November 2021 | Ahmed bin Ali Stadium, Al Rayyan, Qatar | Tunisia | 1–3 | 1–5 | 2021 FIFA Arab Cup |
