= Boubacar Bagili =

Mauritanian association football player

Personal information
- Full name: Boubacar Salam Bagili
- Date of birth: December 7, 1994 (age 31)
- Place of birth: Nouakchott, Mauritania
- Height: 1.75 m (5 ft 9 in)
- Position: Forward

Team information
- Current team: Nouadhibou

Senior career*
Years	Team	Apps	(Gls)
2014–2017	ACS Ksar	?	(?)
2017	US Biskra	7	(1)
2018	ACS Ksar	?	(?)
2018–2019	Hammam-Lif	4	(1)
2019–	Nouadhibou		

International career^{‡}
2015–	Mauritania	23	(6)
- * Club domestic league appearances and goals ‡ National team caps and goals as of 17 July 2017

Boubacar Salam Bagili (born 7 December 1994) is a Mauritanian football player who currently plays for Nouadhibou and the Mauritanian national team.

== International goals ==
As of match played 16 July 2017. Mauritania score listed first, score column indicates score after each Bagili goal.

International goals by date, venue, cap, opponent, score, result and competition
No.	Date	Venue	Cap	Opponent	Score	Result	Competition
1	27 June 2015	Stade Olympique, Nouakchott, Mauritania	3	Sierra Leone	2–0	2–0	2016 African Nations Championship qualification
2	5 September 2015	Stade Olympique, Nouakchott, Mauritania	4	South Africa	2–1	3–1	2017 Africa Cup of Nations qualification
3	8 October 2015	Juba Stadium, Juba, South Sudan	5	South Sudan	1–0	1–1	2018 FIFA World Cup qualification
4	13 October 2015	Stade Olympique, Nouakchott, Mauritania	6	South Sudan	2–0	4–0	2018 FIFA World Cup qualification
5	28 May 2016	Campo Nuevo Municipal de Cornella, Cornellà de Llobregat, Spain	13	Gabon	2–0	2–0	Friendly
6	28 May 2016	Samuel Kanyon Doe Sports Complex, Monrovia, Liberia	23	Liberia	2–0	2–0	2018 African Nations Championship qualification
