= Hlompho Kekana =

South African soccer player

Personal information
- Full name: Hlompho Alpheus Kekana
- Date of birth: 23 May 1985 (age 41)
- Place of birth: Zebediela, Limpopo, South Africa
- Height: 1.76 m (5 ft 9 in)
- Positions: Defensive midfielder; central midfielder

Youth career
- Zebediela Junior Swallows High school doasho high
- 2002–2004: Tshiamo Soccer Academy

Senior career*
Years	Team	Apps	(Gls)
2004–2005	Black Leopards	50	(4)
2005–2007	City Pillars	33	(5)
2007–2008	Black Leopards	39	(2)
2008–2010	Supersport United	51	(4)
2010–2011	Bloemfontein Celtic	48	(6)
2011–2021	Mamelodi Sundowns	371	(44)

International career
2011–2019	South Africa	30	(7)
- * Club domestic league appearances and goals

Hlompho Alpheus Kekana (born 23 May 1985) is a South African former professional soccer player who last played as a midfielder for Mamelodi Sundowns. He retired on 31 August 2021 after he was released by the team. He is known for his powerful long-range goals and precision shooting outside the box.

On 4 March 2012, his team set a record in the Nedbank Cup when they beat Powerlines FC 24–0, with Kekana scoring seven of the goals.

On 26 March 2016, while playing for the national team, Kekana scored on a shot from 65 yards against Cameroon. In 2016, he won the CAF Champions League with Mamelodi Sundowns as the club's captain.

== International career ==
=== International goals ===
Scores and results list South Africa's goal tally first.

Goal	Date	Venue	Opponent	Score	Result	Competition
1.	13 July 2013	Nkoloma Stadium, Lusaka, Zambia	Namibia	2–0	2–1	Friendly
2.	20 July 2013	Levy Mwanawasa Stadium, Ndola, Zambia	Lesotho	2–1	2–1	Friendly
3.	11 January 2014	Cape Town Stadium, Cape Town, South Africa	Mozambique	2–1	3–1	2014 African Nations Championship
4.	26 March 2016	Limbe Stadium, Limbe, Cameroon	Cameroon	2–1	2–2	2017 Africa Cup of Nations qualification
5.	2 September 2016	Mbombela Stadium, Nelspruit, South Africa	Mauritania	1–1	1–1	2017 Africa Cup of Nations qualification
