= Abbas Nshimirimana =

Burundian footballer

Personal information
- Full name: Abbas Nshimirimana
- Date of birth: 19 May 1998 (age 28)
- Place of birth: Burundi
- Position: Midfielder

Team information
- Current team: Guêpiers du Lac

Senior career*
Years	Team	Apps	(Gls)
2014–	Guêpiers du Lac		

International career^{‡}
2015–	Burundi	5	(3)
- * Club domestic league appearances and goals as of 22:42, 15 September 2015 (UTC) ‡ National team caps and goals as of 22:42, 4 April 2017 (UTC)

Abbas Nshimirimana (born 19 May 1998) is a Burundian professional footballer, who plays as a midfielder for Guêpiers du Lac.

== International career ==
=== International goals ===
Scores and results list Burundi's goal tally first.

No	Date	Venue	Opponent	Score	Result	Competition
1.	4 September 2016	Prince Louis Rwagasore Stadium, Bujumbura, Burundi	Djibouti	1–0	2–0	2016 African Nations Championship qualification
2.	4 September 2016	Prince Louis Rwagasore Stadium, Bujumbura, Burundi	Djibouti	2–0	2–0	2016 African Nations Championship qualification
3.	5 September 2015	Prince Louis Rwagasore Stadium, Bujumbura, Burundi	Niger	2–0	2–0	2017 Africa Cup of Nations qualification
