= Enock Sabumukama =

Burundian footballer

Personal information
- Date of birth: 25 December 1995 (age 30)
- Place of birth: Ngozi, Burundi
- Height: 1.78 m (5 ft 10 in)
- Position: Midfielder

Team information
- Current team: Bumamuru

Senior career*
Years	Team	Apps	(Gls)
2012–2017	Le Messager		
2017–2021	ZESCO United		
2021–2023	NAPSA Stars		
2023–	Bumamuru		

International career^{‡}
2014–	Burundi	15	(0)
- * Club domestic league appearances and goals ‡ National team caps and goals as of 26 June 2019

Enock Sabumukama (born 25 December 1995) is a Burundian football player. He plays in Burundi Ligue A club Bumamuru.

== Club career ==
He made his Burundi national football team debut on 15 July 2014 in a game against Kenya.

He was selected for the 2019 Africa Cup of Nations squad.
