= Ahmed El Trbi =

Libyan footballer (born 1992)

Personal information
- Full name: Ahmed Kamal El Trbi
- Date of birth: 6 June 1992 (age 34)
- Place of birth: Benghazi, Libya
- Height: 1.82 m (6 ft 0 in)
- Position: Centre-back

Team information
- Current team: Al Ahli SC (Tripoli)
- Number: 18

Senior career*
Years	Team	Apps	(Gls)
2009–2011	Al-Hilal		
2011–2016	Al-Nasr		
2015	→ El Dakhleya SC (loan)	2	(0)
2015	→ Al-Ahli SC (Tripoli) (loan)	20	(02)
2016	→ Al-Hilal (loan)		
2017–2019	Al-Ittihad		
2019	Haras El Hodoud		
2020–2021	Al-Salt		
2021–2022	Kazma		
2022–	Al Ahli SC (Tripoli)	35	(05)

International career^{‡}
2013–	Libya	61	(0)
Medal record
Men's football
Representing Libya
African Nations Championship
Winner	2014 South Africa
- * Club domestic league appearances and goals as of 19:16, 19 January 2021 (UTC) ‡ National team caps and goals as of 6 June 2022

Ahmed Kamal El Trbi (Arabic: أحمد التربي; born 6 June 1992) is a Libyan professional footballer who plays as a centre-back for Kuwaiti club Kazma and the Libya national team. Ahmed helped Libya win the 2014 African Nations Championship, Libya's first championship.

== Personal life ==
El Tribi is a medical student in Benghazi.

== Honours ==
Libya

- African Nations Championship: 2014
