= 2017 Africa Cup of Nations squads =

The 2017 Africa Cup of Nations was an international football tournament hosted by Gabon from 14 January to 5 February 2017.

== Group A ==
=== Gabon ===
Head coach: (Spain) José Antonio Camacho

The final squad was announced on 27 December 2016, with Axel Méyé, Johann Lengoualama and Donald Nzé being called as standby players.

No.	Pos.	Player	Date of birth (age)	Caps	Club
1	GK	Didier Ovono	23 January 1983 (aged 33)	97	(Belgium) Oostende
2	DF	Aaron Appindangoyé	20 February 1992 (aged 24)	35	(France) Laval
3	DF	Franck Obambou	26 June 1987 (aged 29)	6	(Gabon) Stade Mandji
4	MF	Merlin Tandjigora	6 April 1990 (aged 26)	24	(China) Meizhou Hakka
5	DF	Bruno Ecuele Manga	16 July 1988 (aged 28)	64	(Wales) Cardiff City
6	DF	Johann Obiang	5 July 1993 (aged 23)	20	(France) Troyes
7	FW	Malick Evouna	28 November 1992 (aged 24)	27	(China) Tianjin Teda
8	DF	Lloyd Palun	28 November 1988 (aged 28)	39	(France) Red Star
9	FW	Pierre-Emerick Aubameyang (captain)	18 June 1989 (aged 27)	52	(Germany) Borussia Dortmund
10	MF	Mario Lemina	1 September 1993 (aged 23)	8	(Italy) Juventus
11	MF	Lévy Madinda	11 June 1992 (aged 24)	44	(Spain) Gimnàstic de Tarragona
12	MF	Guélor Kanga	1 September 1990 (aged 26)	27	(Serbia) Red Star Belgrade
13	MF	Samson Mbingui	9 February 1992 (aged 24)	32	(Morocco) Raja Casablanca
14	FW	Serge Kevyn	3 August 1994 (aged 22)	4	(Portugal) União de Leiria
15	MF	Cédric Ondo Biyoghé	17 August 1994 (aged 22)	5	(Gabon) CF Mounana
16	GK	Anthony Mfa Mezui	7 March 1991 (aged 25)	8	Unattached
17	MF	André Biyogo Poko	7 March 1993 (aged 23)	45	(Turkey) Kardemir Karabükspor
18	MF	Serge-Junior Martinsson Ngouali	23 January 1992 (aged 24)	0	(Sweden) IF Brommapojkarna
19	DF	Benjamin Zé Ondo	18 June 1987 (aged 29)	20	(Malta) Mosta
20	MF	Denis Bouanga	11 November 1994 (aged 22)	0	(France) Tours
21	DF	Yoann Wachter	7 April 1992 (aged 24)	1	(France) Sedan
22	MF	Didier Ibrahim N'Dong	17 June 1994 (aged 22)	22	(England) Sunderland
23	GK	Yves Bitséki Moto	23 April 1983 (aged 33)	20	(Gabon) CF Mounana

=== Burkina Faso ===
Head coach: (Portugal) Paulo Duarte

A 24-man provisional squad was announced on 15 December 2016. Souleymane Koanda was added to the provisional squad on 21 December. The final squad was announced on 6 January 2017, with Ernest Congo and Issoumaila Lingane being left out of the team.

No.	Pos.	Player	Date of birth (age)	Caps	Club
1	GK	Aboubacar Sawadogo	10 August 1989 (aged 27)	0	(Burkina Faso) RC Kadiogo
2	DF	Steeve Yago	16 December 1992 (aged 24)	29	(France) Toulouse
3	DF	Issouf Paro	16 October 1994 (aged 22)	2	(South Africa) Santos
4	DF	Bakary Koné	27 April 1988 (aged 28)	66	(Spain) Málaga
5	DF	Patrick Malo	18 February 1992 (aged 24)	6	(Egypt) Smouha
6	MF	Bakary Saré	5 May 1990 (aged 26)	2	(Portugal) Moreirense
7	MF	Préjuce Nakoulma	21 April 1987 (aged 29)	37	(Turkey) Kayserispor
8	FW	Abdou Razack Traoré	28 December 1988 (aged 28)	30	(Turkey) Kardemir Karabükspor
9	FW	Banou Diawara	13 February 1992 (aged 24)	6	(Egypt) Smouha
10	MF	Alain Traoré	1 January 1988 (aged 29)	43	(Turkey) Kayserispor
11	MF	Jonathan Pitroipa	12 April 1986 (aged 30)	68	(United Arab Emirates) Al-Nasr
12	MF	Adama Guira	24 April 1988 (aged 28)	15	(France) Lens
13	DF	Souleymane Koanda	21 September 1992 (aged 24)	2	(Ivory Coast) ASEC Mimosas
14	DF	Issoufou Dayo	6 August 1991 (aged 25)	18	(Morocco) RS Berkane
15	FW	Aristide Bancé	19 September 1984 (aged 32)	60	(Ivory Coast) ASEC Mimosas
16	GK	Kouakou Hervé Koffi	16 October 1996 (aged 20)	3	(Ivory Coast) ASEC Mimosas
17	MF	Jonathan Zongo	6 April 1989 (aged 27)	21	(Spain) Almería
18	MF	Charles Kaboré (captain)	9 February 1988 (aged 28)	74	(Russia) Krasnodar
19	MF	Bertrand Traoré	6 September 1995 (aged 21)	31	(Netherlands) Ajax
20	DF	Yacouba Coulibaly	2 October 1994 (aged 22)	3	(Burkina Faso) RC Bobo Dioulasso
21	FW	Cyrille Bayala	24 May 1996 (aged 20)	5	(Moldova) Sheriff Tiraspol
22	MF	Blati Touré	4 August 1994 (aged 22)	0	(Cyprus) Omonia Nicosia
23	GK	Germain Sanou	26 May 1992 (aged 24)	23	(France) Beauvais

=== Cameroon ===
Head coach: (Belgium) Hugo Broos

A 35-man provisional squad was announced on 12 December 2016. On 20 December, it was announced that Guy N'dy Assembé, André Onana, Joël Matip, Allan Nyom, Maxime Poundjé, Ibrahim Amadou and André-Frank Zambo Anguissa decided to not take part in the competition. Eric Maxim Choupo-Moting also decided to withdraw from the tournament on 3 January 2017. The final squad was announced on 4 January 2017, with Anatole Abang, Henri Bedimo, Aurélien Chedjou and Franck Kom being left out of the team.

No.	Pos.	Player	Date of birth (age)	Caps	Club
1	GK	Fabrice Ondoa	24 December 1995 (aged 21)	22	(Spain) Sevilla Atlético
2	DF	Ernest Mabouka	16 June 1988 (aged 28)	0	(Slovakia) MŠK Žilina
3	DF	Nicolas Nkoulou	27 March 1990 (aged 26)	71	(France) Lyon
4	DF	Adolphe Teikeu	23 June 1990 (aged 26)	4	(France) Sochaux
5	DF	Michael Ngadeu-Ngadjui	23 November 1990 (aged 26)	4	(Czech Republic) Slavia Prague
6	DF	Ambroise Oyongo	22 June 1991 (aged 25)	20	(Canada) Montreal Impact
7	MF	Clinton N'Jie	15 August 1993 (aged 23)	16	(France) Marseille
8	FW	Benjamin Moukandjo (captain)	12 November 1988 (aged 28)	40	(France) Lorient
9	FW	Jacques Zoua	6 September 1991 (aged 25)	14	(Germany) 1. FC Kaiserslautern
10	FW	Vincent Aboubakar	22 January 1992 (aged 24)	48	(Turkey) Beşiktaş
11	MF	Edgar Salli	17 August 1992 (aged 24)	33	(Germany) 1. FC Nürnberg
12	MF	Frank Boya	1 July 1996 (aged 20)	1	(Cameroon) APEJES Academy
13	MF	Christian Bassogog	18 October 1995 (aged 21)	1	(Denmark) AaB
14	MF	Georges Mandjeck	9 December 1988 (aged 28)	29	(France) Metz
15	MF	Sébastien Siani	21 December 1986 (aged 30)	10	(Belgium) Oostende
16	GK	Jules Goda	30 May 1989 (aged 27)	1	(France) Ajaccio
17	MF	Arnaud Djoum	2 May 1989 (aged 27)	3	(Scotland) Heart of Midlothian
18	FW	Robert Ndip Tambe	22 February 1994 (aged 22)	2	(Slovakia) Spartak Trnava
19	DF	Collins Fai	13 August 1992 (aged 24)	2	(Belgium) Standard Liège
20	FW	Karl Toko Ekambi	14 September 1992 (aged 24)	7	(France) Angers
21	DF	Mohammed Djetei	18 August 1994 (aged 22)	3	(Spain) Gimnàstic de Tarragona
22	DF	Jonathan Ngwem	20 July 1991 (aged 25)	2	(Angola) Progresso
23	GK	Georges Bokwé	14 July 1989 (aged 27)	0	(Cameroon) Coton Sport

=== Guinea-Bissau ===
Head coach: Baciro Candé

A 35-man provisional squad was announced on 18 December 2016. Eliseu Cassamá and Yazalde rejected the call. The final squad was announced on 4 January 2017, with Abudu, Guti Almada, Mama Samba Baldé, Edelino Ié, Édouard Mendy, Formose Mendy, Mesca, Pelé, Bruno Pereira, Jean-Paul Mendy, Cícero Semedo and Zé Turbo being left out of the team. Though not part of the preliminary squad, Rui Dabó was added to the squad.

No.	Pos.	Player	Date of birth (age)	Caps	Club
1	GK	Jonas Mendes	20 November 1989 (aged 27)	20	(Portugal) Salgueiros
2	DF	Emmanuel Mendy	30 March 1990 (aged 26)	4	(Spain) Pulpileño
3	MF	Lassana Camará	29 December 1991 (aged 25)	1	(Portugal) Académico de Viseu
4	DF	Tomás Dabó	20 October 1993 (aged 23)	0	(Portugal) Arouca
5	DF	Rudinilson Silva	20 August 1994 (aged 22)	5	Unattached
6	DF	Eridson	25 June 1990 (aged 26)	16	(Portugal) Freamunde
7	MF	Zezinho	23 September 1992 (aged 24)	20	(Greece) Levadiakos
8	MF	Francisco Júnior	18 January 1992 (aged 24)	0	(Norway) Strømsgodset
9	FW	Abel Camará	6 January 1990 (aged 27)	1	(Portugal) Belenenses
10	MF	Bocundji Cá (captain)	28 December 1986 (aged 30)	20	Unattached
11	MF	Nani Soares	17 September 1991 (aged 25)	4	(Portugal) Felgueiras 1932
12	GK	Papa Fall	11 December 1985 (aged 31)	1	(Spain) CD Orellana
13	FW	Frédéric Mendy	18 November 1988 (aged 28)	2	(South Korea) Jeju United
14	DF	Juary Soares	20 February 1992 (aged 24)	5	(Portugal) Mafra
15	MF	Toni Silva	15 September 1993 (aged 23)	2	(Greece) Levadiakos
16	DF	Agostinho Soares	27 January 1990 (aged 26)	5	(Portugal) Sporting da Covilhã
17	MF	Leocísio Sami	18 December 1988 (aged 28)	10	(Turkey) Akhisar Belediyespor
18	MF	Piqueti	12 February 1993 (aged 23)	5	(Portugal) Braga
19	MF	João Mário	11 October 1993 (aged 23)	3	(Portugal) Chaves
20	MF	Idrissa Camará	30 October 1992 (aged 24)	5	(Italy) Avellino
21	MF	Aldair Baldé	31 January 1992 (aged 24)	0	(Portugal) Olhanense
22	DF	Mamadu Candé	29 August 1990 (aged 26)	12	(Portugal) Tondela
23	GK	Rui Dabó	5 October 1994 (aged 22)	0	(Portugal) Cova da Piedade

== Group B ==
=== Algeria ===
Head coach: (Belgium) Georges Leekens

A 32-man provisional squad was announced on 22 December 2016. The final squad was announced on 31 December 2016, with Ayoub Azzi, Ishak Belfodil, Ismaël Bennacer, Yassine Benzia, Sofiane Feghouli, Houari Ferhani, Carl Medjani, Adam Ounas and Idriss Saadi being left out of the team. On January 11, 2017, Ismaël Bennacer was called up to replace Saphir Taïder, who suffered an injury in training.

No.	Pos.	Player	Date of birth (age)	Caps	Club
1	GK	Chamseddine Rahmani	15 September 1990 (aged 26)	0	(Algeria) MO Béjaïa
2	DF	Aïssa Mandi (captain)	22 October 1991 (aged 25)	27	(Spain) Real Betis
3	DF	Faouzi Ghoulam	1 February 1991 (aged 25)	30	(Italy) Napoli
4	DF	Liassine Cadamuro-Bentaïba	5 March 1988 (aged 28)	11	(Switzerland) Servette
5	DF	Hicham Belkaroui	24 August 1990 (aged 26)	9	(Tunisia) ES Tunis
6	DF	Djamel Mesbah	9 October 1984 (aged 32)	35	(Italy) Crotone
7	MF	Riyad Mahrez	21 February 1991 (aged 25)	27	(England) Leicester City
8	MF	Ismaël Bennacer	1 December 1997 (aged 19)	1	(England) Arsenal
9	MF	Sofiane Hanni	29 December 1990 (aged 26)	2	(Belgium) Anderlecht
10	MF	Nabil Bentaleb	24 November 1994 (aged 22)	22	(Germany) Schalke 04
11	MF	Yacine Brahimi	8 February 1990 (aged 26)	31	(Portugal) Porto
12	DF	Mohamed Benyahia	30 June 1992 (aged 24)	0	(Algeria) USM Alger
13	FW	Islam Slimani	18 June 1988 (aged 28)	46	(England) Leicester City
14	FW	Baghdad Bounedjah	30 November 1991 (aged 25)	7	(Qatar) Al-Sadd
15	FW	Hillal Soudani	25 November 1987 (aged 29)	39	(Croatia) Dinamo Zagreb
16	GK	Malik Asselah	8 July 1986 (aged 30)	1	(Algeria) JS Kabylie
17	MF	Adlène Guedioura	12 November 1985 (aged 31)	35	(England) Watford
18	MF	Rachid Ghezzal	9 May 1992 (aged 24)	8	(France) Lyon
19	MF	Mehdi Abeid	6 August 1992 (aged 24)	4	(France) Dijon
20	DF	Mokhtar Belkhiter	15 January 1992 (aged 24)	1	(Tunisia) Club Africain
21	DF	Ramy Bensebaini	16 April 1995 (aged 21)	1	(France) Rennes
22	DF	Mohamed Rabie Meftah	5 May 1985 (aged 31)	8	(Algeria) USM Alger
23	GK	Raïs M'Bolhi	25 April 1986 (aged 30)	48	(Turkey) Antalyaspor

=== Tunisia ===
Head coach: (Poland) Henryk Kasperczak

A 41-man provisional squad was announced on 20 December 2016. The final squad was announced on 4 January 2017, with Ghazi Abderrazzak, Khaled Ayari, Änis Ben-Hatira, Issam Ben Khémis, Farouk Ben Mustapha, Saad Bguir, Nejmeddin Daghfous, Oussama Haddadi, Hamdi Harbaoui, Bilel Ifa, Issam Jebali, Ali Machani, Iheb Mbarki, Yassine Meriah, Idriss Mhirsi, Iheb Msakni, Abdelkader Oueslati and Yoann Touzghar being left out of the team.

No.	Pos.	Player	Date of birth (age)	Caps	Club
1	GK	Rami Jridi	25 April 1985 (aged 31)	14	(Tunisia) CS Sfaxien
2	DF	Syam Ben Youssef	21 March 1989 (aged 27)	27	(France) Caen
3	DF	Aymen Abdennour	6 August 1989 (aged 27)	51	(Spain) Valencia
4	DF	Zied Boughattas	25 December 1990 (aged 26)	7	(Tunisia) ES Sahel
5	DF	Sliman Kchouk	7 May 1994 (aged 22)	0	(Tunisia) CA Bizertin
6	DF	Chamseddine Dhaouadi	16 January 1987 (aged 29)	9	(Tunisia) ES Tunis
7	MF	Youssef Msakni	28 October 1990 (aged 26)	36	(Qatar) Lekhwiya
8	MF	Hamza Lahmar	28 May 1990 (aged 26)	7	(Tunisia) ES Sahel
9	FW	Ahmed Akaïchi	23 February 1989 (aged 27)	21	(Saudi Arabia) Al-Ittihad
10	MF	Wahbi Khazri	8 February 1991 (aged 25)	27	(England) Sunderland
11	FW	Taha Yassine Khenissi	6 January 1992 (aged 25)	12	(Tunisia) ES Tunis
12	DF	Ali Maâloul	1 January 1990 (aged 27)	31	(Egypt) Al-Ahly
13	MF	Ferjani Sassi	18 March 1992 (aged 24)	25	(Tunisia) ES Tunis
14	MF	Mohamed Amine Ben Amor	3 May 1992 (aged 24)	13	(Tunisia) ES Sahel
15	MF	Larry Azouni	23 March 1994 (aged 22)	3	(France) Nîmes
16	GK	Aymen Mathlouthi (captain)	14 September 1984 (aged 32)	59	(Tunisia) ES Sahel
17	DF	Hamza Mathlouthi	25 July 1992 (aged 24)	25	(Tunisia) CS Sfaxien
18	MF	Ahmed Khalil	21 December 1994 (aged 22)	2	(Tunisia) Club Africain
19	FW	Saber Khalifa	14 October 1986 (aged 30)	38	(Tunisia) Club Africain
20	DF	Mohamed Ali Yacoubi	5 October 1990 (aged 26)	11	(Turkey) Çaykur Rizespor
21	DF	Hamdi Nagguez	28 October 1992 (aged 24)	6	(Tunisia) ES Sahel
22	GK	Moez Ben Cherifia	24 June 1991 (aged 25)	17	(Tunisia) ES Tunis
23	MF	Naïm Sliti	27 July 1992 (aged 24)	3	(France) Lille

=== Senegal ===
Head coach: Aliou Cissé

The final squad was announced on 30 December 2016.

No.	Pos.	Player	Date of birth (age)	Caps	Club
1	GK	Abdoulaye Diallo	30 March 1992 (aged 24)	9	(Turkey) Çaykur Rizespor
2	DF	Kara Mbodji	11 November 1989 (aged 27)	33	(Belgium) Anderlecht
3	DF	Kalidou Koulibaly	20 June 1991 (aged 25)	12	(Italy) Napoli
4	DF	Cheikh M'Bengue	23 July 1988 (aged 28)	27	(France) Saint-Étienne
5	MF	Idrissa Gueye	26 September 1989 (aged 27)	40	(England) Everton
6	FW	Famara Diédhiou	15 December 1992 (aged 24)	2	(France) Angers
7	FW	Moussa Sow	19 January 1986 (aged 30)	38	(Turkey) Fenerbahçe
8	DF	Cheikhou Kouyaté (captain)	21 December 1989 (aged 27)	32	(England) West Ham United
9	FW	Mame Biram Diouf	16 December 1987 (aged 29)	38	(England) Stoke City
10	MF	Sadio Mané	10 April 1992 (aged 24)	39	(England) Liverpool
11	MF	Cheikh N'Doye	29 March 1986 (aged 30)	12	(France) Angers
12	MF	Mohamed Diamé	14 June 1987 (aged 29)	34	(England) Newcastle United
13	FW	Moussa Konaté	3 April 1993 (aged 23)	21	(Switzerland) Sion
14	DF	Zargo Touré	11 November 1989 (aged 27)	14	(France) Lorient
15	MF	Papakouli Diop	19 March 1986 (aged 30)	17	(Spain) Espanyol
16	GK	Khadim N'Diaye	5 April 1985 (aged 31)	15	(Guinea) Horoya
17	MF	Badou Ndiaye	27 October 1990 (aged 26)	4	(Turkey) Osmanlıspor
18	MF	Ismaïla Sarr	25 February 1998 (aged 18)	1	(France) Metz
19	DF	Saliou Ciss	15 September 1989 (aged 27)	8	(France) Valenciennes
20	MF	Keita Baldé	8 March 1995 (aged 21)	6	(Italy) Lazio
21	DF	Lamine Gassama	20 October 1989 (aged 27)	24	(Turkey) Alanyaspor
22	MF	Henri Saivet	26 October 1990 (aged 26)	14	(France) Saint-Étienne
23	GK	Pape Seydou N'Diaye	11 February 1993 (aged 23)	0	(Senegal) Niarry Tally

=== Zimbabwe ===
Head coach: Callisto Pasuwa

A 31-man provisional squad was announced on 19 December 2016. The final squad was announced on 4 January 2017, with Nelson Chadya, Liberty Chakoroma, Talent Chawapiwa, Ronald Chitiyo, Tafadzwa Kutinyu, Blessing Moyo, Marshal Mudehwe and Tendai Ndlovu being left out of the team.

No.	Pos.	Player	Date of birth (age)	Caps	Club
1	GK	Bernard Donovan	12 July 1995 (aged 21)	9	(Zimbabwe) How Mine
2	DF	Costa Nhamoinesu	6 January 1986 (aged 31)	7	(Czech Republic) Sparta Prague
3	MF	Danny Phiri	25 July 1989 (aged 27)	30	(South Africa) Golden Arrows
4	DF	Hardlife Zvirekwi	5 May 1987 (aged 29)	36	(Zimbabwe) CAPS United
5	DF	Elisha Muroiwa	28 January 1989 (aged 27)	7	(Zimbabwe) Dynamos
6	DF	Onismor Bhasera	7 January 1986 (aged 31)	29	(South Africa) SuperSport United
7	FW	Matthew Rusike	28 June 1990 (aged 26)	5	(Sweden) Helsingborgs IF
8	FW	Evans Rusike	13 June 1990 (aged 26)	8	(South Africa) Maritzburg United
9	FW	Nyasha Mushekwi	21 August 1987 (aged 29)	14	(China) Dalian Yifang
10	MF	Kudakwashe Mahachi	29 September 1993 (aged 23)	17	(South Africa) Golden Arrows
11	FW	Tendai Ndoro	15 May 1985 (aged 31)	8	(South Africa) Orlando Pirates
12	DF	Bruce Kangwa	24 July 1988 (aged 28)	11	(Tanzania) Azam
13	FW	Cuthbert Malajila	3 October 1985 (aged 31)	28	(South Africa) Bidvest Wits
14	MF	Willard Katsande (captain)	15 January 1986 (aged 30)	22	(South Africa) Kaizer Chiefs
15	DF	Teenage Hadebe	17 September 1995 (aged 21)	10	(Zimbabwe) Chicken Inn
16	GK	Tatenda Mkuruva	4 January 1996 (aged 21)	13	(Zimbabwe) Dynamos
17	FW	Knowledge Musona	21 June 1990 (aged 26)	26	(Belgium) Oostende
18	MF	Marvelous Nakamba	19 January 1994 (aged 22)	5	(Netherlands) Vitesse Arnhem
19	DF	Lawrence Mhlanga	20 December 1993 (aged 23)	9	(Zimbabwe) Chicken Inn
20	MF	Khama Billiat	19 August 1990 (aged 26)	22	(South Africa) Mamelodi Sundowns
21	FW	Tino Kadewere	5 January 1996 (aged 21)	3	(Sweden) Djurgårdens IF
22	DF	Oscar Machapa	1 June 1987 (aged 29)	11	(Democratic Republic of the Congo) AS Vita Club
23	GK	Takabva Mawaya	2 March 1993 (aged 23)	0	(Zimbabwe) Hwange

== Group C ==
=== Ivory Coast ===
Head coach: (France) Michel Dussuyer

A 24-man provisional squad was announced on 28 December 2016. The final squad was announced on 4 January 2017, with Ousmane Viera being left out of the team.

No.	Pos.	Player	Date of birth (age)	Caps	Club
1	GK	Sayouba Mandé	15 June 1993 (aged 23)	4	(Norway) Stabæk
2	MF	Nicolas Pépé	29 May 1995 (aged 21)	3	(France) Angers
3	MF	Serge N'Guessan	31 July 1994 (aged 22)	7	(France) Nancy
4	DF	Lamine Koné	1 February 1989 (aged 27)	9	(England) Sunderland
5	DF	Wilfried Kanon	6 July 1993 (aged 23)	17	(Netherlands) ADO Den Haag
6	MF	Jean Michael Seri	19 July 1991 (aged 25)	11	(France) Nice
7	MF	Victorien Angban	29 September 1996 (aged 20)	5	(Spain) Granada
8	FW	Salomon Kalou	5 August 1985 (aged 31)	90	(Germany) Hertha BSC
9	MF	Wilfried Zaha	10 November 1992 (aged 24)	2	(England) Crystal Palace
10	MF	Cheick Doukouré	11 September 1992 (aged 24)	13	(France) Metz
11	MF	Franck Kessié	19 December 1996 (aged 20)	11	(Italy) Atalanta
12	FW	Wilfried Bony	10 December 1988 (aged 28)	49	(Wales) Swansea City
13	FW	Giovanni Sio	31 March 1989 (aged 27)	21	(France) Rennes
14	FW	Jonathan Kodjia	22 October 1989 (aged 27)	7	(England) Aston Villa
15	MF	Max-Alain Gradel	30 November 1987 (aged 29)	52	(England) Bournemouth
16	GK	Sylvain Gbohouo	29 October 1988 (aged 28)	23	(Democratic Republic of the Congo) TP Mazembe
17	DF	Serge Aurier	24 December 1992 (aged 24)	36	(France) Paris Saint-Germain
18	DF	Adama Traoré	3 February 1990 (aged 26)	7	(Switzerland) Basel
19	DF	Simon Deli	27 October 1991 (aged 25)	6	(Czech Republic) Slavia Prague
20	MF	Serey Dié (captain)	7 November 1984 (aged 32)	33	(Switzerland) Basel
21	DF	Eric Bailly	12 April 1994 (aged 22)	18	(England) Manchester United
22	DF	Mamadou Bagayoko	31 December 1989 (aged 27)	6	(Belgium) Sint-Truiden
23	GK	Badra Ali Sangaré	30 May 1986 (aged 30)	3	(Ivory Coast) AS Tanda

=== DR Congo ===
Head coach: Florent Ibengé

A 31-man provisional squad was announced on 23 December 2016. Benik Afobe rejected the call. The final squad was announced on 6 January 2017, with Jonathan Bijimine, Junior Kabananga, Wilson Kamavuaka, Christian Luyindama, Elia Meschak, Vital N'Simba and Ricky Tulengi being left out of the team. Although he was initially announced as part of the final squad, Hervé Kage was later dropped from the team and replaced by Junior Kabananga.

No.	Pos.	Player	Date of birth (age)	Caps	Club
1	GK	Ley Matampi	18 April 1989 (aged 27)	21	(Democratic Republic of the Congo) TP Mazembe
2	DF	Issama Mpeko	3 March 1986 (aged 30)	46	(Democratic Republic of the Congo) TP Mazembe
3	DF	Fabrice N'Sakala	21 July 1990 (aged 26)	7	(Turkey) Alanyaspor
4	DF	Jordan Ikoko	3 February 1994 (aged 22)	0	(France) Guingamp
5	DF	Marcel Tisserand	10 January 1993 (aged 24)	4	(Germany) FC Ingolstadt
6	FW	Junior Kabananga	4 April 1989 (aged 27)	11	(Kazakhstan) Astana
7	MF	Youssouf Mulumbu (captain)	25 January 1987 (aged 29)	36	(England) Norwich City
8	MF	Paul-José M'Poku	19 April 1992 (aged 24)	6	(Greece) Panathinaikos
9	FW	Dieumerci Mbokani	22 November 1985 (aged 31)	37	(England) Hull City
10	MF	Neeskens Kebano	10 March 1992 (aged 24)	13	(England) Fulham
11	MF	Jordan Botaka	24 June 1993 (aged 23)	11	(England) Charlton Athletic
12	FW	Jonathan Bolingi	30 June 1994 (aged 22)	13	(Democratic Republic of the Congo) TP Mazembe
13	DF	Joyce Lomalisa	18 June 1993 (aged 23)	19	(Democratic Republic of the Congo) AS Vita Club
14	DF	Gabriel Zakuani	31 May 1986 (aged 30)	26	(England) Northampton Town
15	MF	Rémi Mulumba	2 November 1992 (aged 24)	5	(France) Gazélec Ajaccio
16	GK	Mulopo Kudimbana	21 January 1987 (aged 29)	8	(Belgium) Antwerp
17	FW	Cédric Bakambu	11 April 1991 (aged 25)	9	(Spain) Villarreal
18	DF	Merveille Bokadi	21 May 1992 (aged 24)	10	(Democratic Republic of the Congo) TP Mazembe
19	FW	Jeremy Bokila	14 November 1988 (aged 28)	16	(Qatar) Al-Kharaitiyat
20	MF	Jacques Maghoma	23 October 1987 (aged 29)	12	(England) Birmingham City
21	MF	Firmin Ndombe Mubele	17 April 1992 (aged 24)	33	(Qatar) Al-Ahli
22	DF	Chancel Mbemba	8 August 1994 (aged 22)	29	(England) Newcastle United
23	GK	Joël Kiassumbua	6 April 1992 (aged 24)	3	(Switzerland) Wohlen

=== Morocco ===
Head coach: (France) Hervé Renard

A 26-man provisional squad was announced on 22 December 2016. Aziz Bouhaddouz was added to the squad on 2 January 2017 after the injuries of Younès Belhanda and Oussama Tannane. The final squad was announced on 4 January 2017, with Ismail Haddad and Mohamed Nahiri being left out of the team. On 5 January, it was announced that Omar El Kaddouri would join the team in fear of an injury of Nordin Amrabat (which was later confirmed) while Faycal Rherras was called to replace Sofiane Boufal on 13 January.

No.	Pos.	Player	Date of birth (age)	Caps	Club
1	GK	Yassine Bounou	5 April 1991 (aged 25)	7	(Spain) Girona
2	DF	Hamza Mendyl	21 October 1997 (aged 19)	5	(France) Lille B
3	DF	Fouad Chafik	16 October 1986 (aged 30)	8	(France) Dijon
4	DF	Manuel da Costa	6 May 1986 (aged 30)	17	(Greece) Olympiacos
5	DF	Medhi Benatia (captain)	17 April 1987 (aged 29)	44	(Italy) Juventus
6	DF	Romain Saïss	26 March 1990 (aged 26)	8	(England) Wolverhampton Wanderers
7	FW	Youssef En-Nesyri	1 June 1997 (aged 19)	6	(Spain) Málaga
8	MF	Karim El Ahmadi	27 January 1985 (aged 31)	35	(Netherlands) Feyenoord
9	FW	Youssef El-Arabi	3 February 1987 (aged 29)	39	(Qatar) Lekhwiya
10	DF	Faycal Rherras	7 April 1993 (aged 23)	1	(Scotland) Heart of Midlothian
11	MF	Fayçal Fajr	1 August 1988 (aged 28)	7	(Spain) Deportivo La Coruña
12	GK	Munir Mohand Mohamedi	10 May 1989 (aged 27)	11	(Spain) Numancia
13	FW	Khalid Boutaïb	24 April 1987 (aged 29)	5	(France) Strasbourg
14	MF	Mbark Boussoufa	15 August 1984 (aged 32)	42	(United Arab Emirates) Al-Jazira
15	MF	Youssef Aït Bennasser	7 July 1996 (aged 20)	5	(France) Nancy
16	MF	Omar El Kaddouri	21 August 1990 (aged 26)	20	(Italy) Napoli
17	MF	Nabil Dirar	25 February 1986 (aged 30)	20	(France) Monaco
18	DF	Amine Atouchi	1 July 1992 (aged 24)	1	(Morocco) Wydad Casablanca
19	MF	Mounir Obbadi	4 April 1983 (aged 33)	21	(France) Lille
20	FW	Aziz Bouhaddouz	30 March 1987 (aged 29)	3	(Germany) FC St. Pauli
21	MF	Mehdi Carcela	1 July 1989 (aged 27)	14	(Spain) Granada
22	GK	Yassine El Kharroubi	29 March 1990 (aged 26)	3	(Bulgaria) Lokomotiv Plovdiv
23	FW	Rachid Alioui	18 June 1992 (aged 24)	5	(France) Nîmes

=== Togo ===
Head coach: (France) Claude Le Roy

A 25-man provisional squad was announced on 21 December 2016. The final squad was announced on 4 January 2017, with Joseph Douhadji and Victor Nukafu being left out of the team.

No.	Pos.	Player	Date of birth (age)	Caps	Club
1	GK	Cédric Mensah	6 March 1989 (aged 27)	15	(France) Le Mans
2	MF	Franco Atchou	3 December 1995 (aged 21)	4	(Togo) Dynamic Togolais
3	DF	Hakim Ouro-Sama	28 December 1997 (aged 19)	3	AS Togo-Port
4	FW	Emmanuel Adebayor (captain)	26 February 1984 (aged 32)	72	Unattached
5	DF	Serge Akakpo	15 October 1987 (aged 29)	59	(Turkey) Trabzonspor
6	DF	Abdoul-Gafar Mamah	24 August 1985 (aged 31)	84	(Moldova) Dacia Chișinău
7	MF	Mathieu Dossevi	12 February 1988 (aged 28)	14	(Belgium) Standard Liège
8	FW	Komlan Agbégniadan	26 March 1991 (aged 25)	6	(Ghana) West African FA
9	DF	Vincent Bossou	7 February 1986 (aged 30)	27	(Tanzania) Young Africans
10	MF	Floyd Ayité	15 December 1988 (aged 28)	31	(England) Fulham
11	DF	Maklibè Kouloum	5 October 1987 (aged 29)	6	(Togo) Dynamic Togolais
12	MF	Razak Boukari	25 April 1987 (aged 29)	15	(France) Châteauroux
13	DF	Sadat Ouro-Akoriko	1 February 1988 (aged 28)	35	(Saudi Arabia) Al-Khaleej
14	MF	Prince Segbefia	11 March 1991 (aged 25)	26	(Turkey) Göztepe Izmir
15	MF	Alaixys Romao	18 January 1984 (aged 32)	64	(Greece) Olympiacos
16	GK	Kossi Agassa	2 July 1978 (aged 38)	66	Unattached
17	MF	Serge Gakpé	7 May 1987 (aged 29)	43	(Italy) Genoa
18	MF	Lalawélé Atakora	9 November 1990 (aged 26)	25	(Sweden) Helsingborgs IF
19	FW	Kodjo Fo-Doh Laba	27 January 1992 (aged 24)	6	(Morocco) RS Berkane
20	MF	Henri Eninful	21 July 1992 (aged 24)	9	(Cyprus) Doxa Katokopias
21	DF	Djené Dakonam	31 December 1991 (aged 25)	30	(Belgium) Sint-Truiden
22	MF	Ihlas Bebou	23 April 1994 (aged 22)	5	(Germany) Fortuna Düsseldorf
23	GK	Baba Tchagouni	31 December 1990 (aged 26)	21	(France) FC Marmande 47

== Group D ==
=== Ghana ===
Head coach: (Israel) Avram Grant

A 26-man provisional squad was announced on 2 January 2017. The final squad was announced on 4 January 2017, with Fatau Dauda replacing an injured Adam Kwarasey, while Raphael Dwamena, Joseph Larweh Attamah and Abdul Majeed Waris were being left out of the team.

No.	Pos.	Player	Date of birth (age)	Caps	Club
1	GK	Brimah Razak	22 June 1987 (aged 29)	23	(Spain) Córdoba
2	DF	Andy Yiadom	2 December 1991 (aged 25)	0	(England) Barnsley
3	FW	Asamoah Gyan (captain)	22 November 1985 (aged 31)	97	(United Arab Emirates) Shabab Al-Ahli
4	DF	Jonathan Mensah	13 July 1990 (aged 26)	55	(United States) Columbus Crew
5	MF	Thomas Partey	13 June 1993 (aged 23)	5	(Spain) Atlético Madrid
6	MF	Afriyie Acquah	5 January 1992 (aged 25)	25	(Italy) Torino
7	MF	Christian Atsu	10 June 1992 (aged 24)	49	(England) Newcastle United
8	MF	Emmanuel Agyemang-Badu	2 December 1990 (aged 26)	73	(Italy) Udinese
9	FW	Jordan Ayew	11 September 1991 (aged 25)	42	(England) Aston Villa
10	MF	André Ayew	17 December 1989 (aged 27)	71	(England) West Ham United
11	MF	Mubarak Wakaso	25 July 1990 (aged 26)	45	(Greece) Panathinaikos
12	GK	Richard Ofori	1 November 1993 (aged 23)	2	(Ghana) Wa All Stars
13	FW	Ebenezer Assifuah	3 July 1993 (aged 23)	1	(Switzerland) Sion
14	MF	Bernard Tekpetey	3 September 1997 (aged 19)	0	(Germany) Schalke 04
15	MF	Ebenezer Ofori	1 July 1995 (aged 21)	0	(Sweden) AIK
16	GK	Fatau Dauda	6 April 1985 (aged 31)	25	(Nigeria) Enyimba
17	DF	Baba Rahman	2 July 1994 (aged 22)	25	(Germany) Schalke 04
18	MF	Daniel Amartey	21 December 1994 (aged 22)	13	(England) Leicester City
19	DF	Edwin Gyimah	9 March 1991 (aged 25)	10	(South Africa) Orlando Pirates
20	FW	Samuel Tetteh	28 July 1996 (aged 20)	5	(Austria) FC Liefering
21	DF	John Boye	23 April 1987 (aged 29)	54	(Turkey) Sivasspor
22	DF	Frank Acheampong	16 October 1993 (aged 23)	14	(Belgium) Anderlecht
23	DF	Harrison Afful	24 July 1986 (aged 30)	71	(United States) Columbus Crew

=== Mali ===
Head coach: (France) Alain Giresse

A 26-man provisional squad was announced on 30 December 2016. The final squad was announced on 4 January 2017, with Souleymane Diarra, Falaye Sacko and Adama Traoré being left out of the team.

No.	Pos.	Player	Date of birth (age)	Caps	Club
1	GK	Oumar Sissoko	13 September 1987 (aged 29)	24	(France) Orléans
2	DF	Hamari Traoré	27 January 1992 (aged 24)	7	(France) Reims
3	DF	Youssouf Koné	5 July 1995 (aged 21)	7	(France) Lille B
4	DF	Salif Coulibaly	13 May 1988 (aged 28)	24	(Democratic Republic of the Congo) TP Mazembe
5	DF	Charles Traoré	1 January 1992 (aged 25)	2	(France) Troyes
6	MF	Lassana Coulibaly	10 April 1996 (aged 20)	4	(France) Bastia
7	FW	Mustapha Yatabaré	26 January 1986 (aged 30)	33	(Turkey) Kardemir Karabükspor
8	MF	Yacouba Sylla (captain)	29 November 1990 (aged 26)	28	(France) Montpellier
9	FW	Moussa Marega	14 April 1991 (aged 25)	10	(Portugal) Vitória de Guimarães
10	FW	Kalifa Coulibaly	21 August 1991 (aged 25)	7	(Belgium) Gent
11	MF	Bakary Sako	26 April 1988 (aged 28)	19	(England) Crystal Palace
12	MF	Moussa Doumbia	15 August 1994 (aged 22)	7	(Russia) Rostov
13	DF	Molla Wagué	21 February 1991 (aged 25)	22	(Italy) Udinese
14	MF	Sambou Yatabaré	2 March 1989 (aged 27)	30	(Germany) Werder Bremen
15	DF	Mohamed Konate	20 October 1992 (aged 24)	10	(Morocco) RS Berkane
16	GK	Soumbeïla Diakité	25 August 1984 (aged 32)	50	(Mali) Stade Malien
17	MF	Mamoutou N'Diaye	15 March 1990 (aged 26)	15	(Belgium) Antwerp
18	MF	Samba Sow	29 April 1989 (aged 27)	37	(Turkey) Kayserispor
19	MF	Adama Traoré	28 June 1995 (aged 21)	4	(France) Monaco
20	MF	Yves Bissouma	30 August 1996 (aged 20)	7	(France) Lille
21	DF	Mahamadou N'Diaye	21 June 1990 (aged 26)	19	(France) Troyes
22	GK	Djigui Diarra	27 February 1995 (aged 21)	4	(Mali) Stade Malien
23	DF	Ousmane Coulibaly	9 July 1989 (aged 27)	23	(Greece) Panathinaikos

=== Egypt ===
Head coach: (Argentina) Héctor Cúper

A 27-man provisional squad was announced on 29 December 2016. The final squad was announced on 4 January 2017, with Mohamed Awad, Ahmed Gomaa, Mohamed Ibrahim and Hamada Tolba being left out of the team.

No.	Pos.	Player	Date of birth (age)	Caps	Club
1	GK	Essam El-Hadary (captain)	15 January 1973 (aged 43)	147	(Egypt) Wadi Degla
2	DF	Ali Gabr	1 January 1989 (aged 28)	10	(Egypt) Zamalek
3	DF	Ahmed El-Mohamady	9 September 1987 (aged 29)	69	(England) Hull City
4	DF	Omar Gaber	30 January 1992 (aged 24)	21	(Switzerland) Basel
5	MF	Ibrahim Salah	1 April 1987 (aged 29)	33	(Egypt) Zamalek
6	DF	Ahmed Hegazy	25 January 1991 (aged 25)	29	(Egypt) Al-Ahly
7	DF	Ahmed Fathy	10 November 1984 (aged 32)	114	(Egypt) Al-Ahly
8	MF	Tarek Hamed	24 October 1988 (aged 28)	8	(Egypt) Zamalek
9	FW	Kouka	5 March 1993 (aged 23)	11	(Portugal) Braga
10	FW	Mohamed Salah	15 June 1992 (aged 24)	46	(Italy) Roma
11	MF	Mahmoud Kahraba	13 April 1994 (aged 22)	9	(Saudi Arabia) Al-Ittihad
12	DF	Ahmed Dowidar	29 October 1987 (aged 29)	9	(Egypt) Zamalek
13	DF	Mohamed Abdel Shafy	1 July 1985 (aged 31)	42	(Saudi Arabia) Al-Ahli
14	MF	Ramadan Sobhi	23 January 1997 (aged 19)	11	(England) Stoke City
15	DF	Karim Hafez	12 March 1996 (aged 20)	2	(France) Lens
16	GK	Sherif Ekramy	10 July 1983 (aged 33)	19	(Egypt) Al-Ahly
17	MF	Mohamed El-Neny	11 July 1992 (aged 24)	47	(England) Arsenal
18	FW	Marwan Mohsen	26 February 1989 (aged 27)	16	(Egypt) Al-Ahly
19	MF	Abdallah Said	13 June 1985 (aged 31)	22	(Egypt) Al-Ahly
20	DF	Saad Samir	1 April 1989 (aged 27)	6	(Egypt) Al-Ahly
21	MF	Mahmoud Trézéguet	1 October 1994 (aged 22)	12	(Belgium) Mouscron
22	MF	Amr Warda	17 September 1993 (aged 23)	6	(Greece) Panetolikos
23	GK	Ahmed El Shenawy	14 May 1991 (aged 25)	28	(Egypt) Zamalek

=== Uganda ===
Head coach: (Serbia) Milutin Sredojević

A 26-man provisional squad was announced on 30 December 2016. The final squad was announced on 4 January 2017, with Edrisa Lubega, Muzamir Mutyaba & Benjamin Ochan being left out of the team.

No.	Pos.	Player	Date of birth (age)	Caps	Club
1	GK	Robert Odongkara	2 September 1989 (aged 27)	26	(Ethiopia) Saint George
2	DF	Joseph Ochaya	14 December 1993 (aged 23)	36	(Uganda) KCCA
3	MF	Geoffrey Kizito	2 February 1993 (aged 23)	34	(Vietnam) Than Quảng Ninh
4	DF	Murushid Juuko	14 April 1994 (aged 22)	19	(Tanzania) Simba
5	DF	Isaac Isinde	16 April 1991 (aged 25)	52	(Ethiopia) Saint George
6	MF	Tony Mawejje	15 December 1987 (aged 29)	76	(Iceland) Þróttur Reykjavík
7	FW	Yunus Sentamu	13 August 1994 (aged 22)	16	(Finland) Ilves Tampere
8	MF	Khalid Aucho	8 August 1993 (aged 23)	28	(South Africa) Baroka
9	FW	Geoffrey Sserunkuma	7 June 1983 (aged 33)	37	(Uganda) Lweza
10	MF	Luwagga Kizito	20 December 1993 (aged 23)	29	(Portugal) Rio Ave
11	FW	Geofrey Massa (captain)	19 February 1986 (aged 30)	63	(South Africa) Baroka
12	DF	Denis Iguma	10 February 1994 (aged 22)	46	(Iraq) Al-Quwa Al-Jawiya
13	MF	Moses Oloya	22 October 1992 (aged 24)	45	(Vietnam) Hà Nội
14	DF	Nicholas Wadada	27 July 1994 (aged 22)	23	(Uganda) Vipers
15	DF	Godfrey Walusimbi	3 July 1989 (aged 27)	75	(Kenya) Gor Mahia
16	MF	Hassan Wasswa	14 February 1988 (aged 28)	50	(Lebanon) Al-Nejmeh
17	MF	Farouk Miya	26 November 1995 (aged 21)	37	(Belgium) Standard Liège
18	GK	Denis Onyango	15 May 1987 (aged 29)	54	(South Africa) Mamelodi Sundowns
19	GK	Jamal Salim	27 May 1995 (aged 21)	4	(Sudan) Al-Merrikh
20	DF	Timothy Awany	6 August 1996 (aged 20)	4	(Uganda) KCCA
21	FW	Muhammad Shaban	11 January 1998 (aged 19)	1	(Uganda) Onduparaka
22	MF	Shafik Batambuze	14 June 1994 (aged 22)	1	(Kenya) Tusker
23	MF	Micheal Azira	22 August 1987 (aged 29)	1	(United States) Colorado Rapids

== Player representation ==
=== By club ===
Clubs with 3 or more players represented are listed.

Players	Club
7	(Egypt) Al-Ahly
6	(Democratic Republic of the Congo) TP Mazembe
5	(Egypt) Zamalek, (France) Lille, (Tunisia) ES Sahel, (Tunisia) ES Tunis
4	(France) Angers
3	(Belgium) Anderlecht, (Belgium) Oostende, (Belgium) Standard Liège, (England) Leicester City, (England) Newcastle United, (England) Sunderland, (France) Metz, (France) Troyes, (Germany) Schalke 04, (Greece) Panathinaikos, (Italy) Napoli, (Ivory Coast) ASEC Mimosas, (Morocco) RS Berkane, (Switzerland) Basel, (Tunisia) Club Africain, (Turkey) Kardemir Karabükspor, (Turkey) Kayserispor

=== By club nationality ===
Players	CAF clubs
16	Tunisia
15	Egypt
13	South Africa
8	(Democratic Republic of the Congo) DR Congo
7	Zimbabwe
5	Morocco, Uganda
4	Algeria, Ivory Coast
3	Gabon, Togo, Tanzania
2	Burkina Faso, Cameroon, Ethiopia, Ghana, Kenya, Mali
1	Angola, Guinea, Nigeria, Senegal, Sudan

Players	Clubs outside CAF
55	France
35	England
19	Portugal, Spain
18	Turkey
15	Belgium
14	Italy
11	Germany
8	Greece
7	Switzerland
5	Qatar, Sweden
4	Netherlands, Saudi Arabia
3	China, Czech Republic, United Arab Emirates, United States
2	Cyprus, Moldova, Norway, Russia, Scotland, Slovakia, Vietnam, Wales
1	Austria, Bulgaria, Canada, Croatia, Denmark, Finland, Iceland, Iraq, Lebanon, Kazakhstan, Malta, Serbia, South Korea

=== By club federation ===
Players	Federation
236	UEFA
103	CAF
20	AFC
4	CONCACAF

=== By representatives of domestic league ===
National squad	Players
Tunisia	14
Egypt	12
Zimbabwe	7
DR Congo	5
Uganda	5
Algeria	4
Gabon	3
Togo	3
Burkina Faso	2
Cameroon	2
Mali	2
Ghana	1
Ivory Coast	1
Morocco	1
Senegal	1
Guinea-Bissau	0
