= FC Ararat =

FC Ararat may refer to:

- FC Ararat Moscow
- FC Ararat Tallinn
- F.C. Ararat Tehran
- FC Ararat Yerevan
- FC Ararat-Armenia
- ASA Issy, Association Sportive Ararat Issy
