= Charles Boateng =

Charles Boateng may refer to:

- Charles Boateng (footballer, born 1989), Ghanaian footballer
- Charles Boateng (footballer, born 1997), Ghanaian footballer
