= Formose Mendy =

Formose Mendy may refer to:

- Formose Mendy (footballer, born 1989), Bissau-Guinean football winger
- Formose Mendy (footballer, born 1993), French football centre-back
- Formose Mendy (footballer, born 2001), Senegalese football defender
