= Koanda =

Koanda is a surname. Notable people with the surname include:

- Solfrid Koanda (born 1998), Norwegian weightlifter
- Souleymane Koanda (born 1992), Burkinabé footballer
