= Attoumani =

Attoumani is a surname. Notable people with the surname include:

- Ahmed Attoumani Douchina (born 1955), Mahoran politician
- Ben Ahmed Attoumani (born 1982), Comorian footballer
- Dailami Attoumani (born 1999), French serial killer
- Karim Attoumani (born 2001), Comorian footballer
