= Miguel de Pina =

Portuguese footballer

Personal information
- Full name: Miguel Tavares Veiga de Pina
- Date of birth: 26 February 1981 (age 45)
- Place of birth: Lisbon, Portugal
- Height: 1.83 m (6 ft 0 in)
- Position: Striker

Senior career*
Years	Team	Apps	(Gls)
?–2008	Unknown		
2008–2009	Issy		
2009–2010	Red Star	14	(2)
2010	Gloria Bistriţa	4	(0)
- * Club domestic league appearances and goals

Miguel Tavares Veiga de Pina (born 26 February 1981 in Lisbon) is a Portuguese former professional footballer who played as a striker.
