= Rénald Metelus =

French footballer (born 1993)

Personal information
- Full name: Rénald Metelus
- Date of birth: January 6, 1993 (age 33)
- Place of birth: Levallois-Perret, France
- Height: 1.81 m (5 ft 11 in)
- Position: Defender

Team information
- Current team: Oissel

Youth career
- 2000–2006: Issy-les-Moulineaux FC
- 2006–2007: Montrouge FC 92
- 2007–2008: L'Entente SSG
- 2008–2009: INF
- 2009–2010: Le Havre AC

Senior career*
| Years | Team | Apps | (Gls) |
| 2010–2013 | Le Havre B | 40 | (0) |
| 2013–2015 | US Ivry | 37 | (2) |
| 2015–2016 | ESM Gonfreville | 10 | (0) |
| 2016–2017 | Drapeau Fougeres | 15 | (0) |
| 2017–2018 | US Avranches B | 11 | (0) |
| 2017–2018 | US Avranches | 14 | (1) |
| 2019– | Oissel | 7 | (1) |

International career^{‡}
| 2009 | France U-17 | 1 | (0) |
| 2013– | Haiti | 2 | (0) |
- * Club domestic league appearances and goals as of 22:21, 30 October 2019 (UTC) ‡ National team caps and goals as of 21 October 2017

Rénald Metelus (born 6 January 1993) is a footballer for CMS Oissel and the Haiti national football team.

== Career ==
Metelus began his senior career in 2008 with the INF Clairefontaine.

== National ==
In 2009, Metelus represented in an international match for the French U-17 football team. In 2013, he represented the national team of Haiti.

Metelus also appeared for the senior Haiti national football team in a 3-3 2017 Kirin Challenge Cup tie with Japan on 10 October 2017.
