= Oumar Timbo =

Mauritanian footballer

Personal information
- Full name: Khalid Oumar Timbo
- Date of birth: April 27, 1978 (age 48)
- Place of birth: Mauritania
- Height: 1.91 m (6 ft 3 in)
- Position: Midfielder

Youth career
- 1999–2001: ASC Mauritel

Senior career*
Years	Team	Apps	(Gls)
2001–2004	FC Sens		
2004–2005	US Avranches		
2005–2009	FC Drouais		
2009–2010	AS Ararat Issy		

International career
2002–2006	Mauritania	6	(0)
- * Club domestic league appearances and goals

Khalid Oumar Timbo (born 27 April 1978) was a Mauritanian footballer.

== International career ==
Timbo is a member of the Mauritania national football team and holds six caps.
