= Baye Ablaye Mbaye =

Senegalese footballer (born 2004)

Personal information
- Date of birth: 12 January 2004 (age 22)
- Place of birth: Senegal
- Position: Defender

Team information
- Current team: Avranches
- Number: 4

Youth career
- –2023: CNEPS Excellence
- 2022–2023: → Bastia (loan)

Senior career*
Years	Team	Apps	(Gls)
2022–2024	CNEPS Excellence		
2022–2023	→ Bastia B (loan)		
2023–2024	→ Bastia (loan)	3	(0)
2023–2024	→ Bastia B (loan)	19	(2)
2024–	Avranches	26	(0)
- * Club domestic league appearances and goals as of 4 December 2025

Baye Ablaye Mbaye (born 12 January 2004) is a Senegalese professional footballer who plays as a defender for Championnat National 1 club Avranches.

== Career ==
In the 2022–23 season, Mbaye was loaned to Bastia, playing for the club's reserves in the Régional 1 and under-19s in the Championnat National U19. On 1 August 2023, he returned to the club on loan, integrating the first team. However, his parent club CNEPS Excellence contested this, claiming that a new loan for the player had not been approved by the club nor by FIFA. Bastia responded by clarifying that Mbaye's loaned had been confirmed with the LFP, FFF, and FIFA. On 19 August 2023, he made his professional debut in a 2–1 Ligue 2 defeat to Amiens.

Mbaye joined Championnat National 1 club Avranches in July 2024.
