= CD Orellana =

Spanish football team

Orellana Costa Dulce
- Full name: Club Deportivo Orellana Costa Dulce
- Founded: 1979
- Ground: Polideportivo Municipal de Orellana, Orellana la Vieja, Extremadura, Spain
- Capacity: 600
- Chairman: (Spain) Antonio Canelo
- League: Segunda Extremeña – Group 2
Home colours	Away colours

Club Deportivo Orellana Costa Dulce is a Spanish football team based in Orellana la Vieja, in the autonomous community of Extremadura. Founded in 1979 as CD Orellana la Vieja, they play in Segunda Extremeña – Group 2, holding home games at Polideportivo Municipal de Orellana la Vieja.

== Season to season ==
Season	Tier	Division	Place	Copa del Rey
1979–80	7	2ª Reg.	13th	
1980–81	7	2ª Reg.	3rd	
1981–82	DNP			
1982–83	DNP			
1983–84	6	1ª Reg.	13th	
1984–85	6	1ª Reg.	17th	
1985–86	6	1ª Reg.	4th	
1986–87	6	1ª Reg.	1st	
1987–88	5	Reg. Pref.	1st	
1988–89	4	3ª	14th	
1989–90	4	3ª	19th	
1990–91	5	Reg. Pref.	2nd	
1991–92	4	3ª	19th	
1992–93	6	1ª Reg.	12th	
1993–94	6	1ª Reg.	5th	
1994–95	6	1ª Reg.	4th	
1995–96	6	1ª Reg.	5th	
1996–97	5	Reg. Pref.	17th	
1997–98	5	Reg. Pref.	16th	
1998–99	DNP			

Season	Tier	Division	Place	Copa del Rey
1999–2000	DNP			
2000–01	DNP			
2001–02	6	1ª Reg.	7th	
2002–03	6	1ª Reg.	3rd	
2003–04	6	1ª Reg.	3rd	
2004–05	5	Reg. Pref.	15th	
2005–06	5	Reg. Pref.	11th	
2006–07	5	Reg. Pref.	12th	
2007–08	5	Reg. Pref.	9th	
2008–09	5	Reg. Pref.	17th	
2009–10	5	Reg. Pref.	8th	
2010–11	5	Reg. Pref.	12th	
2011–12	5	Reg. Pref.	10th	
2012–13	5	Reg. Pref.	16th	
2013–14	5	Reg. Pref.	16th	
2014–15	6	1ª Reg.	9th	
2015–16	6	1ª Reg.	4th	
2016–17	6	2ª Ext.	12th	
2017–18	DNP			
2018–19	DNP			

Season	Tier	Division	Place	Copa del Rey
2019–20	6	2ª Ext.	9th	
2020–21	DNP			
2021–22	7	2ª Ext.	4th	
2022–23	7	2ª Ext.	6th	
2023–24	7	2ª Ext.	12th	
2024–25	DNP			
2025–26	7	2ª Ext.		

- 3 seasons in Tercera División
