= Joseph Mbarga =

Cameroonian footballer

Personal information
- Date of birth: 7 November 1971 (age 54)
- Place of birth: Yaoundé, Cameroon
- Position: Midfielder

Senior career*
Years	Team	Apps	(Gls)
–1996	Olympic Mvolyé		
1996–1997	Lleida		
1998	Atlético Junior		
1999–2001	Avranches		

International career
1991–1996	Cameroon		
- * Club domestic league appearances and goals

Joseph Mbarga (born 7 November 1971) is a Cameroonian former professional footballer who played as a midfielder.
