= Messie Biatoumoussoka =

Congolese footballer (born 1998)

Personal information
- Date of birth: 5 June 1998 (age 28)
- Place of birth: Saint-Denis, France
- Height: 1.89 m (6 ft 2 in)
- Position: Centre-back

Team information
- Current team: Hamrun Spartans
- Number: 20

Youth career
- 2005–2007: CO Beauvais
- 2007–2014: AS Beauvais
- 2014–2016: Le Havre

Senior career*
Years	Team	Apps	(Gls)
2016–2018	Bordeaux II	21	(0)
2018–2021	Charleroi	0	(0)
2019–2020	→ Avranches II (loan)	11	(1)
2021	POX FC	12	(0)
2021–2022	1599 Șelimbăr	10	(1)
2022	POX FC	14	(0)
2022–2023	Botev Vratsa	24	(1)
2023	AS FAR	1	(0)
2024	Botev Vratsa	16	(0)
2025	Dinamo Batumi	5	(0)
2025–2026	Lokomotiv Sofia	7	(1)
2026–	Hamrun Spartans	0	(0)

International career^{‡}
2022–	Congo	2	(0)
- * Club domestic league appearances and goals as of 16 October 2026 ‡ National team caps and goals as of 20 June 2024

Messie Biatoumoussoka (born 5 June 1998) is a professional footballer who plays as a centre-back for Maltese Premier League club Hamrun Spartans. Born in France, he represents the Congo national team.

== Career ==
Biatoumoussoka is a youth product of the academies of CO Beauvais, AS Beauvais and Le Havre. He began his senior career with the reserves of Bordeaux where he won the French U19 tournament in 2017. He moved to Belgium with Charleroi on 26 June 2018. He was loaned to the reserves of Avranches for the 2019–20 season. In 2021, he moved to the Cypriot club POX FC, with a stint at the Romanian club 1599 Șelimbăr in 2021. He returned to POX FC for the second half of the 2021–22 season. In the summer of 2022, he transferred to the Bulgarian club Botev Vratsa.

== International career ==
Born in France, Biatoumoussoka is of Brazzaville-Congolese descent. He debuted for the Congo national team in a friendly 2–0 loss to Mauritania on 27 September 2022.
