= Anthony Fournier =

French footballer (born 1989)

Personal information
- Date of birth: 30 April 1989 (age 37)
- Place of birth: France
- Position: Midfielder

Senior career*
| Years | Team | Apps | (Gls) |
| -2008 | Paris Saint-Germain F.C. | 0 | (0) |
| 2008-2010 | ASA Issy | 50 | (1) |
| 2010/2011 | US Roye-Noyon | 7 | (0) |
| 2011-2013 | Pacy Ménilles RC | 45 | (5) |
| 2013-2014 | Royal Football Club Seraing | 22 | (0) |
| 2014-2015 | K.V. Woluwe-Zaventem | 12 | (0) |
| 2014/2015 | Royale Union Saint-Gilloise→(loan) | 10 | (0) |
| 2015-2017 | US Granville | 40 | (1) |
| 2017/2018 | AS Beauvais Oise | 13 | (0) |
| 2018-2019 | US Lusitanos Saint-Maur | 10 | (0) |
- * Club domestic league appearances and goals

Anthony Fournier (born 30 April 1989 in France) is a French footballer.
