= Novi Žednik =

Novi Žednik Нови Жедник (Serbian)
- Village (Selo)
- Location within Vojvodina Location within Serbia Location within Europe
- Coordinates: 45°56′N 19°40′E
- Country: Serbia
- Province: Vojvodina

Population (2022)
  - Total: 1,994
- Time zone: UTC+1 (CET)
  - Summer (DST): UTC+2 (CEST)

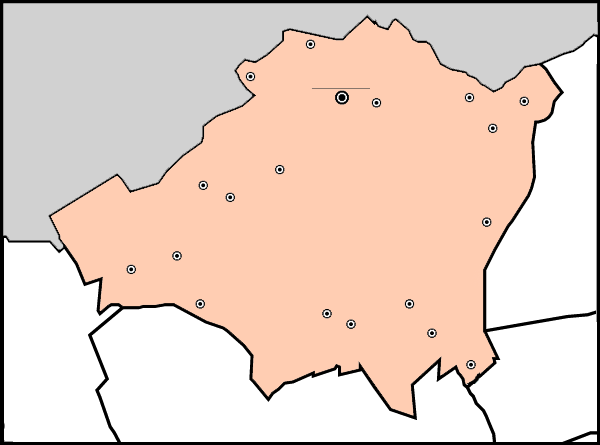

Novi Žednik (Serbian Cyrillic: Нови Жедник) is a village located in the administrative area of the City of Subotica, in the North Bačka District, Vojvodina, Serbia. The village has a population of 1,994 people (2022 census). The village contains an elementary school, two Orthodox churches and a train station.

== Name ==
In Serbian the settlement is known as Novi Žednik (Нови Жедник), in Bunjevac as Novi Žednik, in Hungarian as Újnagyfény, and in Croatian as Novi Žednik. Sometimes, it is known simply as Žednik (Жедник).

== Demographics ==
=== Historical population ===
- 1961: 6,931
- 1971: 6,090
- 1981: 3,195
- 1991: 2,932
- 2011: 2,399
- 2022: 1,994

=== Ethnic groups ===
According to data from the 2022 census, ethnic groups in the village include:

- 1,366 (68.5%) Serbs
- 205 (10.3%) Bunjevci
- 116 (5.8%) Hungarians
- 96 (4.8%) Croats
- Others/Undeclared/Unknown

== Famous people ==
- Živko Slijepčević (Retired football player; Coach)
- Stuberi (Group of YouTubers with 1M+ subscribers)

== See also ==
- List of places in Serbia
- List of cities, towns and villages in Vojvodina
