= Živko Slijepčević =

Serbian football manager and player

Živko Slijepčević Живко Слијепчевић
Personal information
- Date of birth: 19 August 1957 (age 69)
- Place of birth: Gerzovo, SFR Yugoslavia
- Height: 1.78 m (5 ft 10 in)
- Position: Midfielder

Youth career
- 1965–1968: Preporod Novi Žednik
- 1968–1975: Spartak Subotica

Senior career*
Years	Team	Apps	(Gls)
1975–1988	Spartak Subotica	245	(59)
1985	→ Trepča (loan)	16	(5)
1989–1989	Quimper Cornouaille	63	(9)
1989–1993	Valenciennes	94	(9)
1993–1997	Trélissac		

Managerial career
- 1995–1997: Trélissac
- 1998–2001: Notron
- 2001–2006: US Concarneau
- 2008–2010: US Avranches
- 2010–2016: Trélissac
- * Club domestic league appearances and goals

Živko Slijepčević (Serbian Cyrillic: Живко Слијепчевић; born 19 August 1957) is a Serbian football manager and former player.

He played for FK Preporod Novi Žednik, FK Spartak Subotica, Quimper Cornouaille FC, Valenciennes FC and Trélissac FC. Currently working as a coach of French Trélissac FC.

== Playing career ==
=== Club ===
Born in Gerzovo, SR Bosnia and Herzegovina, he grew up in northern Serbia, in a town of Novi Žednik, near Subotica. There he made his first football steps at local club FK Preporod Novi Žednik, where he competed in a lower league. His talent was noticed by the people from FK Spartak Subotica who brought him to the club in 1968. He will play for Spartak for the following 20 years. He became a senior in 1975, and with the exception of the second half of the 1984–85 season, which he spent on loan with FK Trepča, he will play with Spartak in the Yugoslav Second League until 1998.

After a long stay in Subotica, he went to France, where he still lives and works. There, as a player he represented clubs, and also three as a coach. The longest club he played for, was the one he trains nowadays, Trélissac FC. In the season 1992/93 he played with Valenciennes FC in the Ligue 1.

== Managerial career ==
By the end of his playing career, he already became a player/coach during the last two seasons with Trélissac FC. Later, he was the head coach head of other French clubs such as Notron, US Concarneau, US Avranches, and Trélissac FC again.

== Honours ==
- Vice-champion of Ligue 2 in 1992 with Valenciennes FC
