= Jean-Pierre Fiala =

Cameroonian footballer

Personal information
- Full name: Jean-Pierre Fiala Fiala
- Date of birth: 22 April 1969 (age 57)
- Place of birth: Yaoundé, Cameroon
- Height: 1.84 m (6 ft 0 in)
- Position: Midfielder

Senior career*
Years	Team	Apps	(Gls)
1993–1995	Canon Yaoundé		
1995–1996	AE Larissa	7	(0)
1996–1997	Persma Manado		
1997–1998	Persija Jakarta		
1998–1999	Brest	13	(3)
1999–2000	US Avranches	22	(3)
Total		42+	(6+)

International career
1992–1994	Cameroon	8	(1)
- * Club domestic league appearances and goals

Jean-Pierre Fiala Fiala (born 22 April 1969) is a Cameroonian former international footballer who played as a midfielder.

== Club career ==
Born in Yaoundé, Fiala played for Canon Yaoundé, AE Larissa, Persma Manado, Persija Jakarta, Brest and US Avranches.

== International career ==
Fiala earned 8 caps for the Cameroon, and represented them at the 1994 FIFA World Cup.
