= Dzahani =

Coordinates: 11°39′26″S 43°16′32″E

- Village
- Interactive map of Dzahani
- Country: Comoros
- Island: Grande Comore

Population (1991)
  - Total: 1,045
- Time zone: UTC+3 (EAT)

Dzahani is a village on the island of Grande Comore (Ngazidja) in the Comoros. According to the 1991 census, the village had a population of 1045.

== Notable people ==
- Ben Ahmed Attoumani, footballer
