= Rui Dabó =

Portuguese-born Guinean-Bissau footballer

Personal information
- Full name: Rui Suleimane Camara Dabó
- Date of birth: 5 October 1994 (age 32)
- Place of birth: Setúbal, Portugal
- Height: 1.91 m (6 ft 3 in)
- Position: Goalkeeper

Team information
- Current team: Oliveirense
- Number: 1

Youth career
- 2002–2013: Vitória Setúbal

Senior career*
Years	Team	Apps	(Gls)
2013–2014	Caldas	1	(0)
2014–2016	Pinhalnovense	7	(0)
2016–2017	Cova da Piedade	1	(0)
2017–2018	Olímpico Montijo	16	(0)
2018	Moncarapachense	8	(0)
2018	CF Armacenenses	0	(0)
2019	Fabril Barreiro		
2019	Fátima	0	(0)
2019–2020	Comércio e Indústria	16	(0)
2020–	Oliveirense	3	(0)

International career^{‡}
2017–	Guinea-Bissau	1	(0)
- * Club domestic league appearances and goals as of 25 June 2024 ‡ National team caps and goals as of 15:15, 1 October 2019 (UTC)

Rui Suleimane Camara Dabó (born 5 October 1994) is a footballer who plays for Oliveirense as a goalkeeper. Born in Portugal, he represents Guinea-Bissau at international level.

== Career ==
Born in Setúbal, Dabó has played club football for Caldas, Pinhalnovense, Cova da Piedade, Olímpico Montijo, LGC Moncarapachense, CF Armacenenses, Fabril Barreiro, Fátima, Comércio e Indústria and Oliveirense.

He made his international debut for Guinea-Bissau in 2017.
