= Orellana la Vieja =

Orellana la Vieja, Spain
- municipality
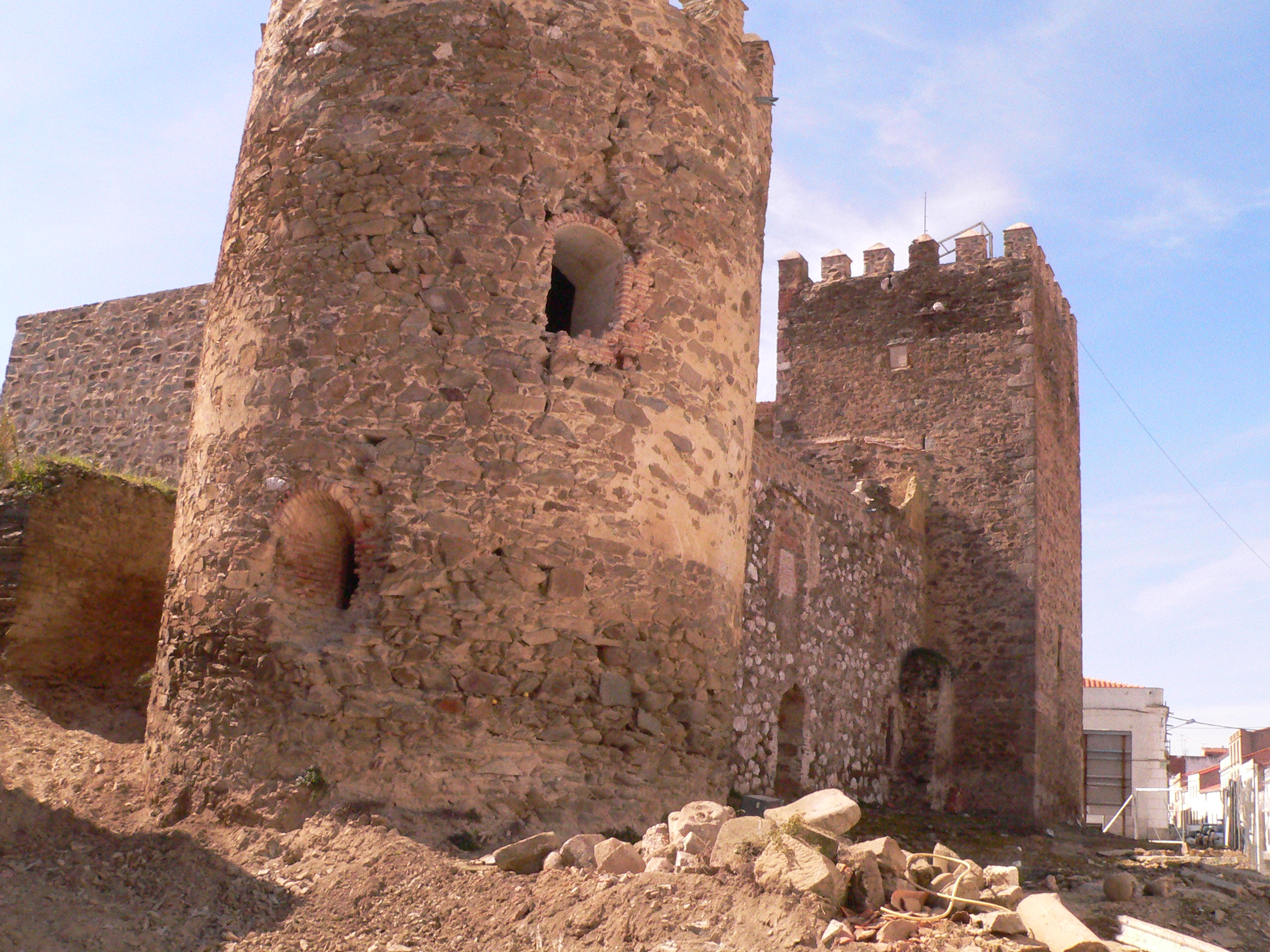
- Round tower of the Altamiranos Palace House in Orellana la Vieja (Badajoz)

- Coat of arms
- Interactive map of Orellana la Vieja, Spain
- Country: Spain
- Autonomous community: Extremadura
- Province: Badajoz

Area
  - Total: 37 km^{2} (14 sq mi)
- Elevation: 351 m (1,152 ft)

Population (2025-01-01)
  - Total: 2,580
  - Density: 70/km^{2} (180/sq mi)
- Time zone: UTC+1 (CET)
  - Summer (DST): UTC+2 (CEST)

Orellana la Vieja is a municipality located in the province of Badajoz, Extremadura, Spain. According to the 2005 census (INE), the municipality has a population of 3033 inhabitants.

== See also ==
- List of municipalities in Badajoz
