= US Avranches =

French football club, based in Avranches

- Full name: L’Union Sportive Avranches Mont Saint Michel
- Founded: 1897; 129 years ago
- Ground: Stade René Fenouillère; Avranches, Normandy
- Capacity: 2,000
- Chairman: Gilbert Guerin
- Manager: Cédric Hengbart
- League: Championnat National 2
- 2024–25: National 2 Group B, 9th of 16
- Website: www.usamsm.org
Home colours	Away colours

L’Union Sportive Avranches Mont Saint Michel (French: [lynjɔ̃ spɔʁtiv avʁɑ̃ʃ mɔ̃ sɛ̃ miʃɛl]), known as US Avranches is a French football club based in Avranches, in the department of Manche, and founded in 1897. Since the 2024–25 season, it plays in the Championnat National 1, the fourth tier of French football. On December 19, 2025, US Avranches stunned Ligue 1 team Brest in the 2025-26 Coupe de France round of 64, winning on penalty kicks, 1–1 (5–4).

The club has been chaired by Gilbert Guérin since 1990.

== History ==
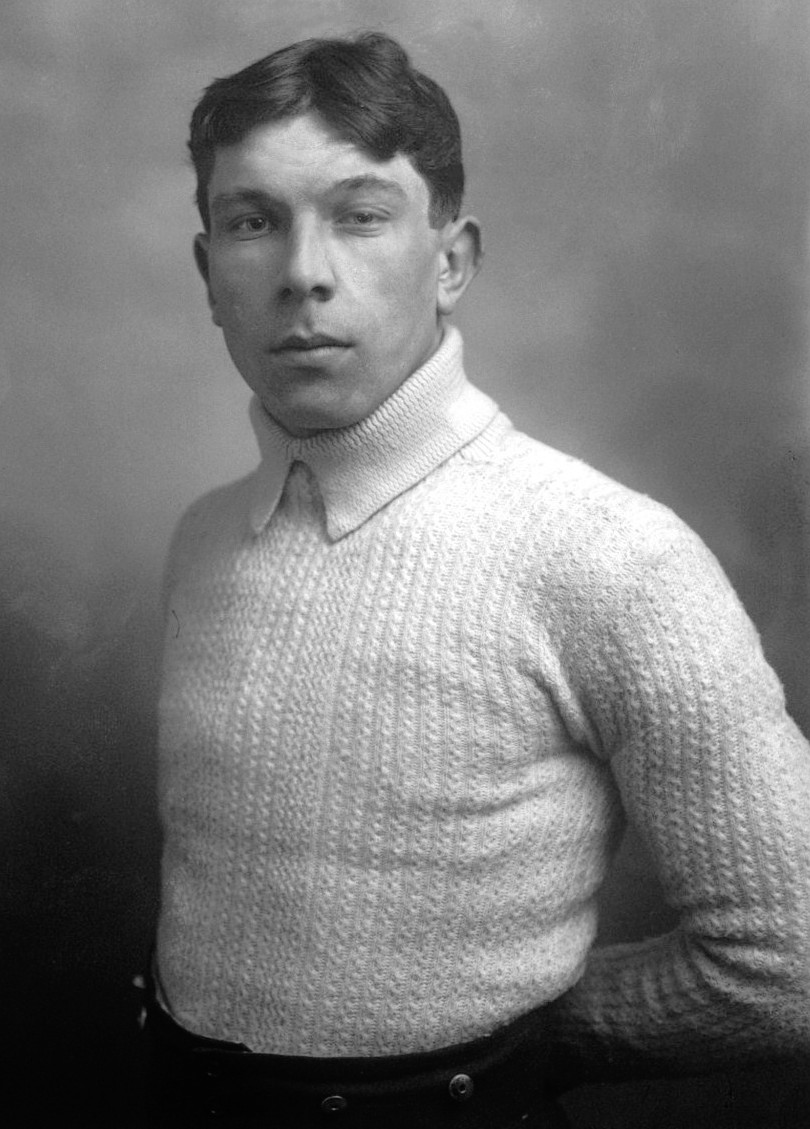
Pierre Chayriguès, coach from 1952 to 1955

Football arrived in Avranches in the mid-19th century, due to an influx of British immigrants who brought their customs and lifestyle to the area. In 1895, Paul Lebedel and Auguste Desclos, with approval from Henri Goujon, formed the Association Sportive du Collège d'Avranches. The club had several sections of sport, which included gymnastics, fencing and shooting, but the club specialized in football. The ASCA recruited most of their players from students who attended the university and players who lived nearby. The club endured difficulties following a match against Stade Rennais Université, now Stade Rennais F.C., after the external players arrived home too late following the match. This caused a significant outrage from their parents and guardians and, eventually, the ASCA were forced to abandon signing players from outside the university. Due to this, a man named Alexandre Legrand concluded that the people outside the university should form their own club. After discussions, the club was formed in April 1897 as L’Union Sportive Avranches'. Due to his input, Legrand was inserted as the club's treasurer. The club competed mainly against local colleges in Avranches and played their first official match against AS du Collège de Vire.

=== Current state ===
The club's performance during the 20th century was mostly muted with the club often hovering in between the 7th, 6th, 5th, and 4th divisions until reaching the Championnat National at the end of the 1992–93 season. The competition, at the time, involved two geographical areas and was mostly the top amateur clubs. The club won its first match, a 2–0 victory over AS Cherbourg, and went undefeated in their first nine matches. However, the club soon hit a slide and ended up finishing 9th. They remained in National for another three years before suffering relegation to the CFA, where they lasted only one year falling down to CFA 2 in 1998–99. After 10 years in CFA 2, the club finally returned to the CFA after their 2nd-place finish. The 2013-14 season then saw the club win the CFA and get promotion back to the National league, though falling back to the Championnat National 2, at the end of the 2023-24 season.

== Chairmen ==
Présidents of l'US Avranches Mont-Saint-Michel

Rang	Nom	Période
1	(France) Marcel Barbé	1897–1907
2	(France) Victor Poisnel	1907–1914
3	(France) Armand Lebreton	1917–1940
4	(France) Alexandre Legrand	1940–1943
5	(France) Eugène Dodier	1943–1944
6	(France) Henri Barbé	1944–1945
7	(France) Docteur Gendrot	1945–1960
8	(France) Albert Nativelle	1960–1970

Rang	Nom	Période
9	(France) Claude Masson	1970–1973
10	(France) Docteur Gendrot	1973–1975
11	(France) Albert Nativelle	1975–1976
12	(France) Rémi Guérin	1976–1981
13	(France) Thierry Lecardonel	1981–1985
14	(France) Gérard Antoine	1985–1988
15	(France) Philippe Dupré	1988–1990
16	(France) Gilbert Guérin	Depuis 1990

== Team kit ==
The club's kit since 2025, are manufactured by the Japanese sporting goods company Mizuno.

== Stadium ==
The clubs stadium was renamed after former player and French international René Fenouillière in the 1930's in memorial to him losing his life in the first world war. Built in 1960, the stadium has a capacity of 2,650.

== Notable coaches ==
Managers of l'US Avranches Mont-Saint-Michel

Rang	Nom	Période
1	(France) Jean Lhermitte	1947–?
2	(France) Pierre Chayriguès	1952–1955
3	(France) Lucien Vallaeys	1966–1970
4	(France) Gilles Hidrio	1970–1972
5	(France) Luis Borgo	1972–1973
6	(France) Adolphe Mamberta	1974–1978
7	(France) Roland Beatrix	1978–1981
8	(France) Pierre Leresteux	1981–1986
9	(France) Bernard Maccio	1986–1997

Rang	Nom	Période
10	(France) Bernard Maligorne	1997–1999
11	(France) Gilles Guillot	1999–2000
12	(France) Yann Ruel	2000–2001
13	(France) Bernard Maccio	2001–2002
14	(France) Richard Lecour	2002
15	(France) Christophe Point	2002–2005
16	(France) Jean-Noël Le Buzullier	2005–2007
17	(Serbia) Živko Slijepčević	2008–2010
15	(France) Stéphane Mottin	2010–

== Players ==
=== Current squad ===
As of 26 January 2026.

Note: Flags indicate national team as defined under FIFA eligibility rules; some limited exceptions apply. Players may hold more than one non-FIFA nationality.

No.	Pos.	Nation	Player
1	GK	FRA	Anthony Beuve
3	DF	FRA	Pierre Bourdin
4	DF	SEN	Baye Ablaye Mbaye
6	MF	FRA	Noah Françoise
7	FW	FRA	Vincent Créhin
8	MF	GHA	Charles Boateng
9	FW	FRA	Shahin Cissé
10	MF	GEO	Zourab Sopromadze
11	FW	FRA	Anas Lamrabette
12	MF	BEN	Jordan Adéoti
14	FW	FRA	Kenny Herbin

No.	Pos.	Nation	Player
16	GK	FRA	Nathan Bisson
17	DF	FRA	Paul Terrien
18	MF	FRA	Killian Gesmier
19	DF	FRA	Nassim Sabihi
24	DF	CGO	Steevy Mazikou
25	MF	FRA	Jessy Pi
26	DF	FRA	Emeric Dudouit
27	DF	FRA	Damon Bansais
28	FW	FRA	Ali Dicko
29	DF	FRA	Sasha Delestre
30	GK	FRA	Alexandre Marfaing

== Notable players ==
Players that have full international caps who have played for the club.

1. (Algeria) Victor Lekhal
2. (Benin) Jordan Adéoti
3. (Benin) Khaled Adénon
4. (Cameroon) Devis Epassy
5. (Cameroon) Jean-Pierre Fiala
6. (Cameroon) Joseph Mbarga
7. (Canada) Justin Smith
8. (Central African Republic) Arnaud Tattevin
9. (Central African Republic) Goduine Koyalipou
10. (Comoros) Ben Ahmed Attoumani
11. (Comoros) Kassim M'Dahoma
12. (Republic of the Congo) Messie Biatoumoussoka
13. (Democratic Republic of the Congo) Samuel Essende
14. (France) René Fenouillière
15. (France) Jonathan Clauss
16. (French Guiana) Simon Lugier
17. (Guadeloupe) Yannick Passape
18. (Guadeloupe) Brice Cognard
19. (Haiti) Dany Jean
20. (Haiti) Rénald Metelus
21. (Haiti) Steven Séance
22. (Haiti) Leverton Pierre
23. (Haiti) Martin Expérience
24. (Ivory Coast) Gérard Gnanhouan
25. (Madagascar) Jérôme Mombris
26. (Madagascar) Hakim Abdallah
27. (Mali) Youssoufou Niakaté
28. (Mali) Cheick Traoré
29. (Martinique) Yoan Pivaty
30. (Martinique) Mickaël Malsa
31. (Martinique) Harold Voyer
32. (Martinique) Oumar Timbo
33. (Morocco) Azzedine Ounahi
34. (Senegal) Mamadou N'Diaye
35. (Togo) Cédric Mensah
36. (Tunisia) Moataz Zemzemi
