= Formose Mendy (footballer, born 1993) =

French footballer (born 1993)

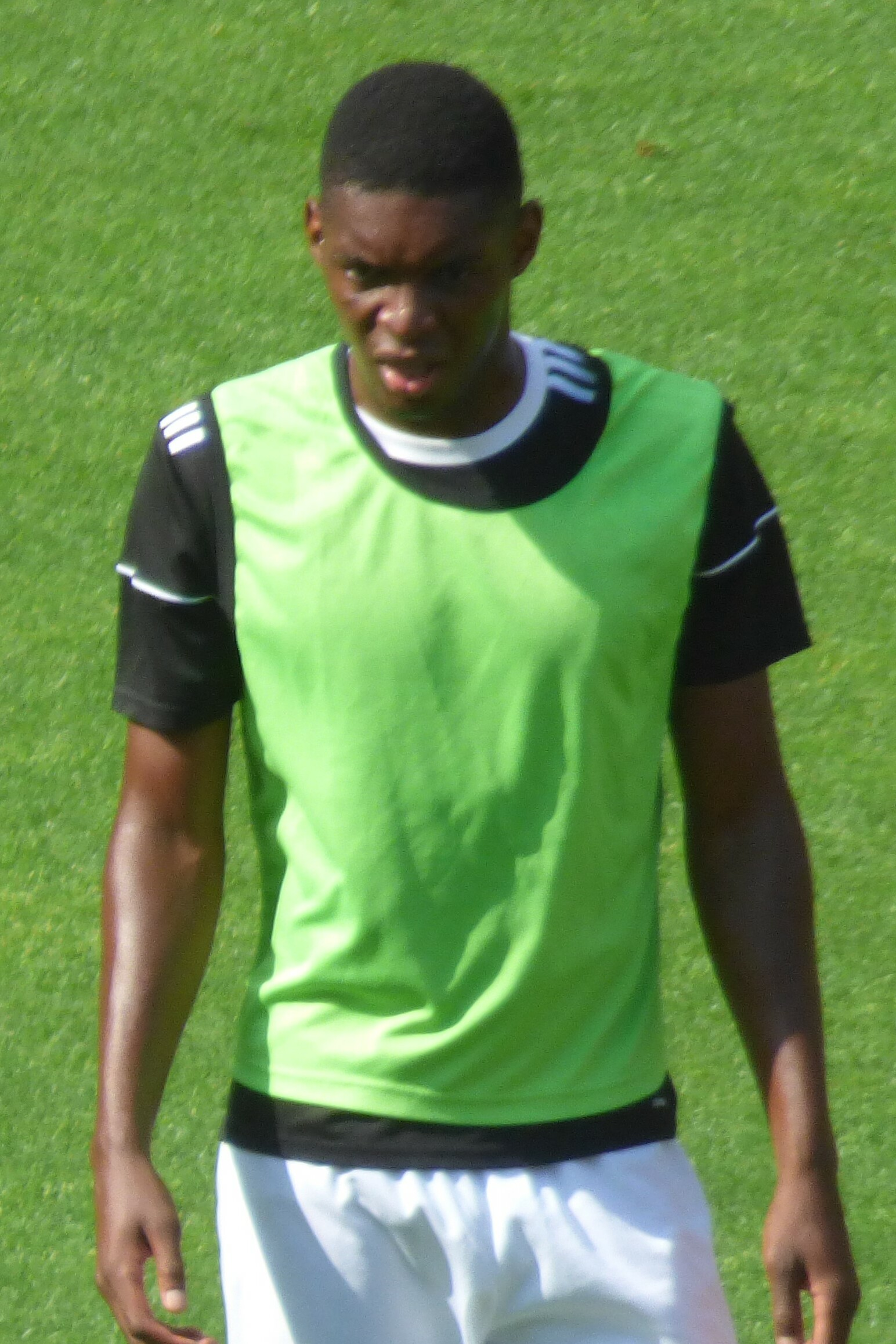
- Mendy in 2018

Personal information
- Full name: Formose Jean-Pierre Mendy
- Date of birth: 8 October 1993 (age 33)
- Place of birth: Lagny-sur-Marne, France
- Height: 1.85 m (6 ft 1 in)
- Position: Centre-back

Team information
- Current team: Rouen
- Number: 22

Youth career
- 1999–2008: Torcy
- 2006–2009: INF Clairefontaine
- 2009–2013: Lille

Senior career*
Years	Team	Apps	(Gls)
2012–2013	Lille II	10	(0)
2013–2016	Zulte Waregem	34	(1)
2016–2020	Red Star	85	(6)
2020–2022	Boulogne	12	(2)
2020–2022	Boulogne II	2	(0)
2022–2023	Avranches	31	(0)
2023–2025	Nîmes	58	(1)
2025–	Rouen	27	(1)

International career
2009–2010	France U17	9	(0)
- * Club domestic league appearances and goals as of 16 May 2026

Formose Mendy (born 8 October 1993) is a French professional footballer who plays as a centre-back for Ligue 3 club Rouen.

== Club career ==
Mendy signed a contract with Zulte Waregem in 2013, having come through the youth system at Lille. In May 2014 he signed a two-year extension with the club with the option of two further years.

In July 2016 Mendy signed a two-year contract with Red Star. He was appointed captain during the 2017–18 season, following the injury to Matthieu Fontaine. He extended his contract at the club for a further three years in May 2018.

In July 2020, Mendy joined Championnat National rivals Boulogne.

On 22 July 2022, Mendy signed a two-year deal with Avranches in Championnat National. On 13 June 2025, he signed for Rouen.

== International career ==
Mendy is a France youth international of Senegalese and Bissau-Guinean descent, capped nine times at Under-17 level. He was called up to the preliminary squad for Guinea Bissau for the 2017 Africa Cup of Nations.
