= Ben Ahmed Attoumani =

Comorian former footballer (born 1982)

Personal information
- Date of birth: 15 September 1982 (age 44)
- Place of birth: Dzahani, Comoros
- Height: 1.75 m (5 ft 9 in)
- Position: Left-back

Youth career
- –2000: Le Havre AC B
- 2000–2001: FC Lorient B
| 2001–2003 | ESM Gonfreville | | |
| 2003–2004 | ÉDS Montluçon | | |
| 2004 | US Avranches | | |
| 2004–2005 | ÉDS Montluçon | | |
| 2005–2008 | Villemomble Sports | 52 | (1) |
| 2008–2009 | US Chantilly | | |
| 2009–2010 | US Sénart-Moissy | 1 | (0) |
| 2010–2011 | FCM Aubervilliers | 4 | (0) |
| 2011–2012 | Noisy-Le-Grand FC | | |

International career
| Years | Team | Apps | (Gls) |
| 2010–2011 | Comoros | 3 | (0) |

Ben Ahmed Attoumani (born 15 September 1982) is a Comorian former footballer who is last known to have played for Noisy-Le-Grand FC.

== Career ==
Seeking a return to Paris as well as finding a higher level of play, Attoumani signed for US Sénart-Moissy in summer 2009, adapting well into his new team.

The former captain of the Comoros national team, Attoumani has been likened to Brazilian left-back Roberto Carlos for his performances during a 2013 Africa Cup of Nations qualifier versus Mozambique.

In 2009, the Comorian defender was enamored of Brazilians Douglas Maicon and Dani Alves due to their defending ability.
