= Maklibè Kouloum =

Togolese footballer

Personal information
- Date of birth: 5 October 1987 (age 39)
- Position: Midfielder

Team information
- Current team: Dynamic Togolais

Senior career*
Years	Team	Apps	(Gls)
2007–2008	Kakadlé Défalé		
2009–2012	ASKO Kara		
2013–	Dynamic Togolais		

International career^{‡}
2016–	Togo	20	(0)
- * Club domestic league appearances and goals as of 15:24, 21 January 2017 (UTC) ‡ National team caps and goals as of 08:43, 27 March 2019 (UTC)

Maklibè Kouloum (born 5 October 1987) is a Togolese international footballer who plays for Dynamic Togolais as a midfielder.

== Career ==
Kouloum has played for Kakadlé Défalé, ASKO Kara and Dynamic Togolais.

He made his international debut in 2016, and was named in the squad for the 2017 Africa Cup of Nations.
