= Cédric Mensah =

Togolese footballer (born 1989)

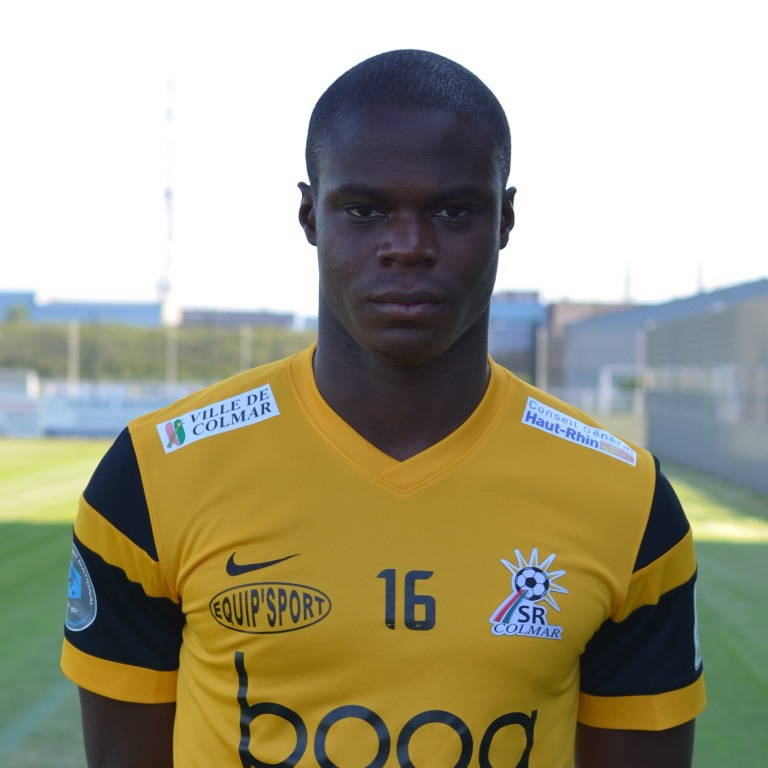
- Mensa with Colmar

Personal information
- Date of birth: 6 March 1989 (age 37)
- Place of birth: Marseille, France
- Height: 1.87 m (6 ft 2 in)
- Position: Goalkeeper

Youth career
- 1997–1998: JS Arménienne Saint-Antoine
- 1998–1999: SA Saint-Antoine
- 1999–2000: S.O. Caillolais
- 2000–2001: UST Marseille
- 2001–2007: Bordeaux
- 2007–2008: Lille

Senior career*
Years	Team	Apps	(Gls)
2008–2009	Paris FC	2	(0)
2010–2013	Marseille B	24	(0)
2013	Colmar B	2	(0)
2013–2016	Colmar	89	(0)
2016–2018	Le Mans	47	(0)
2018–2019	Laval B	9	(0)
2018–2019	Laval	0	(0)
2020–2022	Jura Sud	33	(0)
2022–2023	Stade Poitevin	23	(0)
2023–2024	Avranches	6	(0)

International career
2007–2017	Togo	14	(0)
- * Club domestic league appearances and goals as of 16 June 2024

Cédric Mensah (born 6 March 1989) is a professional footballer who plays as a goalkeeper. Born in France, he has been a member of the Togo national team.

== Club career ==
Born in Marseille, Mensah played in Marseille for the lower division clubs JS Arménienne Saint-Antoine, SA Saint-Antoine, S.O. Caillolais and UST Marseille. With 14 years he moved to FC Girondins de Bordeaux and in the 2006–07 season he was as reserve (back-up) keeper for one match. He left than Bordeaux in July 2007, signed a contract for OSC Lille played here in the reserve and on 3 August 2008 signed a contract with Paris FC. He played only two games in his first season for Paris FC. The football goalkeeper terminated his contract with Paris FC on 15 October 2009. After one year without a club signed for Olympique de Marseille where he played in the reserve team.

== International career ==
Mensah is member of the Togo national team, he played his debut for Togo on 1 June 2008 against Zambia.
