= Aboubacar Sawadogo =

Burkinabe footballer (born 1989)

Personal information
- Full name: Babayouré Aboubacar Sawadogo
- Date of birth: 10 August 1989 (age 37)
- Place of birth: Bobo-Dioulasso, Burkina Faso
- Height: 1.92 m (6 ft 4 in)
- Position: Goalkeeper

Senior career*
Years	Team	Apps	(Gls)
2014–2018	RC Kadiogo		
2018–2019	Al-Nojoom		
2019–2020	AS Douanes	11	(2)
2020–2024	RC Kadiogo	98	(1)

International career
2017–2022	Burkina Faso	20	(0)
Medal record
Representing Burkina Faso
Africa Cup of Nations
Third place	2017 Gabon
- * Club domestic league appearances and goals

Babayouré Aboubacar Sawadogo (born 10 August 1989) is a Burkinabe former footballer who played as a goalkeeper.

== Career ==
Born in Bobo-Dioulasso, Sawadogo has played for RC Kadiogo, Al-Nojoom and AS Douanes. He signed for Al-Nojoom on 9 August 2018.

He made his international debut for Burkina Faso in 2017, earning 20 caps.
