= Charles Boateng (footballer, born 1989) =

Ghanaian footballer

Personal information
- Date of birth: 14 December 1989 (age 36)
- Place of birth: Mampong, Ghana
- Height: 1.75 m (5 ft 9 in)
- Position: Midfielder

Team information
- Current team: Avranches
- Number: 8

Youth career
- –2004: Nania

Senior career*
Years	Team	Apps	(Gls)
2004–2008	Nania		
2007	→ Tema Youth (loan)		
2008–2010	Dijon	46	(4)
2010–2011	Rouen	34	(1)
2012–	Avranches	405	(23)

International career
2005	Ghana U17	3	(0)
- * Club domestic league appearances and goals as of 4 December 2025

Charles Boateng (born 14 December 1989) is a Ghanaian footballer who plays as a midfielder for French club US Avranches.

== Club career ==
Born in Mampong, Boateng began his career with Nania F.C. and played with his team at the youth cup in Altstetten 2004 and 2005, reaching the final. Boateng was loaned to Tema Youth for a year in January 2007 and was a member of the Ghana Premier League All Star team 2007. After a trial in June 2007, he moved in January 2008 from Nania to Dijon FCO.

He was one of the players to be banned from the Ghana Division 2 after the match-fixing scandal with Nania and Okwawu United.

After three seasons with Dijon FCO, Boateng signed on 14 June 2010 for FC Rouen.

In January 2012, Boateng signed for US Avranches.

== International career ==
He also played for Ghana U17 team at 2005 FIFA U-17 World Championship.
