= Donald Nzé =

Gabonese footballer

Personal information
- Date of birth: 5 April 1992 (age 34)
- Position: Goalkeeper

Team information
- Current team: AS Pélican

Senior career*
Years	Team	Apps	(Gls)
2015–	AS Pélican		

International career^{‡}
2017–	Gabon	1	(0)
- * Club domestic league appearances and goals as of 13:35, 13 March 2018 (UTC) ‡ National team caps and goals as of 13:35, 13 March 2018 (UTC)

Donald Nzé (born 5 May 1992) is a Gabonese international footballer who plays for AS Pélican as a goalkeeper.

== Career ==
He has played club football for AS Pélican.

He made his international debut for Gabon in 2017.
