= ASA Issy =

French football club

ASOA Issy
- Full name: Association Sportive Ararat Issy
- Founded: 1975
- Ground: Parc des sports Issy-les-Moulineaux
- League: CFA2 Group G
- 2008-09: CFA2 Group G, 11th
Home colours

Association Sportive Ararat Issy is a French football club founded in 1975 based in Issy-les-Moulineaux. Managed by Franck Toutoundjian, A.S.A Issy (or A.S Ararat Issy) plays in the CFA 2 in 2009–10.

== History ==
In 1974, a group of friends decided to create a football club for Armenian community of Ile-de-France. It was essentially a way of sharing their passion for sport with the youth of the community at the same time as transmitting some of the rich cultural heritage of Armenia, one of the oldest civilisations in the world.

The Association Sportive Arménienne (A.S.A) decided to play in Issy-les-Moulineaux after the request of Armand Zarpanelian, former player who built the stadium in 1981. The club had around 60 players and played in the first Division in the District.

At the start of the 1990s, A.S.A Issy had been promoted three years running, and played in the first Division of the District of the D.H (Division d'Honneur). The match to get promoted to the P.H (Promotion d'Honneur) is well remembered. 1200 people watched the 3–0 victory for A.S.A Issy against F.C Montrouge 92, an attendance record for this level of match.

The team has not yet dropped back down to this level, but they have had difficult seasons in their history. It took a 2–0 victory against F.C Massy 91, to stay in the D.H (Division d'Honneur), with two extraordinary goals from Michel Milosevic, both player and general manager.

To begin with, the club only used players of Armenian origin. A.S.A Issy became progressively more open, and tries to conserve and develop a community and familial spirit. Franck Toutoundjian, club president, is quoted as saying: "the community aspect has never been a fixation, but we are the only community club playing in the C.F.A 2". This is why, in 2003, the club changed its name from Association Sportive Arménienne, to Association Sportive d'Origine Arménienne, so that A.S.A Issy became A.S.O.A Issy. The club currently has around 400 members, with thirty coaches and fifteen technicians. The club also has twelve referees and two controllers represented on the board of the District of Hauts-de-Seine (92).

At the end of the 2005/2006 season, the A.S.O.A Issy team finished in first place with the best attack, the best defence, and the two highest scorers in the league (Eric Akoun and Julien Potier). After 14 seasons in the D.H (Division d'Honneur), the team began the 2006/2007 season in C.F.A 2 and therefore represented the town of Issy-les-Moulineaux as well as the agglomeration of Arc de Seine (five towns with almost 165 000 inhabitants).

A.S.O.A Issy is, in sporting terms, the major football club for the town of Issy-les-Moulineaux since F.C Issy-les-Moulineaux has a smaller number of members. It is fact the biggest sports club in the town of Issy-les-Moulineaux.

At the start of the 2008/2009 season, the club changed its name for a second time, from Association Sportive d'Origine Arménienne, to Association Sportive Ararat, so that A.S.O.A Issy became A.S.A Issy (or A.S Ararat Issy).

This is because, under the ownership of Franck Toutoundjian and Patrick Chêne, A.S.A Issy became associated with Groupe 365 (part of Groupe Sporever) under the control of sporting internet sites such as Football365.fr, to play an important role in the project of MyFootballClub.

Due to the role of strong personalities, the team continues to grow: Armand Zarpanelian, the club's founder, Sarkis Kasparian, former president, Michel Milosevic, Jean-Pierre Ortz, Vincent Yazmadjian, youth coach, Franck Toutoundjian, the current president, and many others.

The club have also been supported by André Santini, Mayor of Issy-les-Moulineaux, who has supported the club since its foundation.

== Current squad ==
Note: Flags indicate national team as defined under FIFA eligibility rules; some limited exceptions apply. Players may hold more than one non-FIFA nationality.

No.	Pos.	Nation	Player
1	GK	(Algeria) ALG	Faouzi Amzal
2	DF	(France) FRA	Erwan Barazer
3	DF	(England) ENG	William Mounir
4	DF	(France) FRA	Pierre Bellissens
5	DF	(United States) USA	Jérémie Dickenson
6	DF	(Senegal) SEN	Abrahim Tounkara
7	MF	(Tunisia) TUN	Henry Gbizie
8	MF	(France) FRA	Valentin Charbonnier
9	FW	(France) FRA	Grégory Lefort
10	MF	(France) FRA	Valentin Charbonnier
11	FW	(France) FRA	Grégory Lefort
12	DF	(Italy) ITA	Andy Felsina
14	FW	(Morocco) MAR	Anouar Fatmi

No.	Pos.	Nation	Player
15	MF	(France) FRA	Laurent Mohellebi
17	MF	(France) FRA	Anthony Fournier
18	FW	(Senegal) SEN	Kévin Koumé
19	MF	(France) FRA	Albin Brion
20	FW	(France) FRA	Julien Potier
21	MF	(Armenia) ARM	Julien Zenguinian
22	GK	(France) FRA	Teddy Tortes
24	MF	(Cape Verde) CPV	Steve Mendes
25	DF	(Italy) ITA	Axel Verrechia
26	MF	(Mali) MLI	Namadia Berete
28	FW	(France) FRA	Yoann Condette
29	MF	(Mauritania) MTN	Oumar Timbo

== Honours ==
- Champions of the D.H - Paris / Ile de France : 2006
