= Souleymane Koanda =

Burkinabé footballer

Personal information
- Date of birth: 21 September 1992 (age 34)
- Place of birth: Ouagadougou, Burkina Faso
- Height: 1.86 m (6 ft 1 in)
- Position: Defender

Team information
- Current team: Salitas

Senior career*
Years	Team	Apps	(Gls)
2013–2014	ASFA Yennenga		
2014–2016	Étoile Filante		
2016–2019	ASEC Mimosas		
2019	JS Kabylie	0	(0)
2020	Slutsk	28	(3)
2021–	Salitas	48	(5)

International career^{‡}
2015–2017	Burkina Faso	2	(0)
Medal record
Representing Burkina Faso
Africa Cup of Nations
Third place	2017 Gabon
- * Club domestic league appearances and goals as of 18 June 2023 ‡ National team caps and goals as of 13:10, 16 January 2017 (UTC)

Souleymane Koanda (born 21 September 1992) is a Burkinabé international footballer who plays as a defender.

== Career ==
Koanda has played for ASFA Yennenga and Étoile Filante. In 2020 he played for Slutsk.

=== International ===
He made his international debut in 2015, and was named in the squad for the 2017 Africa Cup of Nations.
