= 2014–15 Burundi Ligue A =

Burundi Ligue A
- Season: 2014–15
- Dates: 19 September 2014 – 31 May 2015
- Champions: Vital'O
- Relegated: Prince Louis; Volontaires; Académie Tchité
- Champions League: Vital'O
- Confederation Cup: Athlético Olympic
- Matches: 240
- Goals: 523 (2.18 per match)
- Biggest home win: LLB Académic 6–0 Nyanza United
- Biggest away win: Académie Tchité 0–8 Inter Star
- Highest scoring: Académie Tchité 0–8 Inter Star

The 2014–15 Burundi Ligue A season, also known as the Amstel Ligue for sponsorship reasons, was the 52nd edition of the top flight football competition in Burundi. The league was expanded from fourteen to sixteen teams and began on 19 September 2014 and concluded on 31 May 2015. Vital'O was crowned as champion with thirteen points ahead of the defending champion, LLB Sport 4 Africa.

== Teams ==
A total of sixteen clubs participate in this season. Twelve teams from previous season and four new promoted sides.

Promoted from Ligue B

- Rusizi
- Olympic Star
- Le Messager Bujumbura
- Abawigeze

Relegated from Ligue A

- Espoir de Mutimbuzi
- Flamengo de Ngagara

Other changes

- Abawigeze FC was renamed as Nyanza United.
- Guêpiers du Lac was renamed as Bujumbura City.
- LLB Académic was renamed as LLB Sport 4 Africa.

=== Stadiums and locations ===
Locations of teams in the 2014–15 Ligue A.

Team	Location	Stadium	Stadium capacity
Académie Tchité	Bujumbura	Stade du Prince Louis Rwagasore	22,000
Athlético Olympic	Bujumbura	Stade du Prince Louis Rwagasore	22,000
Bujumbura City	Bujumbura	Stade du Prince Louis Rwagasore	22,000
Flambeau de l'Est	Ruyigi	Stade de Ruyigi	2,000
Inter Star	Bujumbura	Stade du Prince Louis Rwagasore	22,000
LLB Sport 4 Africa	Bujumbura	Stade du Prince Louis Rwagasore	22,000
Le Messager Ngozi	Rumonge	Stade Onmisports Ivyizigiro	5,418
Le Messager Bujumbura	Bujumbura	Stade du Prince Louis Rwagasore	22,000
Muzinga	Bujumbura	Stade du Prince Louis Rwagasore	22,000
Nyanza United	Magara	Stade de football de Magara	1,000
Olympic Star Muyinga	Muyinga	Stade Municipal de Muyinga	10,000
Prince Louis	Bujumbura	Stade du Prince Louis Rwagasore	22,000
Royal Muramvya	Muramvya	Stade Municipal de Muramvya	2,000
Rusizi	Cibitoke	Stade Municipal de Cibitoke	1,000
Vital'O	Bujumbura	Stade du Prince Louis Rwagasore	22,000
Volontaires	Kanyosha	Stade de Kanyosha	1,000

== League table ==
Pos	Team	Pld	W	D	L	GF	GA	GD	Pts	Qualification or relegation
1	Vital'O (C)	30	23	3	4	66	13	+53	72	Qualification for the CAF Champions League
2	LLB Sport 4 Africa	30	18	5	7	47	18	+29	59	
3	Bujumbura City	30	15	8	7	39	25	+14	53	
4	Le Messager Ngozi	30	14	8	8	43	25	+18	50	
5	Athlético Olympic	30	12	11	7	28	20	+8	47	Qualification for the CAF Confederation Cup (Note: Athlético Olympic qualify for the CAF Confederation Cup as a runners-up of the 2015 Coupe du Président de la République.)
6	Inter Star	30	12	8	10	34	30	+4	44	
7	Muzinga	30	10	10	10	32	30	+2	40	
8	Rusizi	30	11	7	12	25	25	0	40	
9	Olympic Star Muyinga	30	9	12	9	28	23	+5	39	
10	Flambeau de l'Est	30	9	12	9	34	32	+2	39	
11	Nyanza United	30	8	10	12	23	34	−11	34	
12	Le Messager Bujumbura	30	8	9	13	25	28	−3	33	
13	Royal de Muramvya	30	7	10	13	24	41	−17	31	
14	Prince Louis (R)	30	9	3	18	32	51	−19	30	Relegation to Burundi Ligue B
15	Volontaires (R)	30	7	8	15	25	41	−16	29	Relegation to Burundi Ligue B
16	Académie Tchité (R)	30	5	2	23	18	87	−69	17	Relegation to Burundi Ligue B

Source: Soccerway
Rules for classification: 1st points; 2nd goal difference; 3rd goals scored.
(C) Champions; (R) Relegated

== Results ==
All teams play in a double round robin system (home and away).

Home \ Away	ACA	ATL	BUJ	FLA	INT	LLB	LMN	LMB	MUZ	NYA	OLY	PRI	ROY	RUS	VIT	VOL
Académie Tchité	—	1–1	0–3	0–3	0–8	1–2	0–6	1–0	0–6	0–2	0–2	1–7	1–3	0–3	0–5	0–3
Athlético Olympic	1–0	—	0–1	1–1	0–1	1–0	0–0	0–0	0–1	3–2	0–0	2–1	1–0	0–0	1–1	1–1
Bujumbura City	1–0	0–1	—	2–1	1–2	0–3	1–0	1–1	0–1	0–0	0–1	3–1	5–1	2–2	0–0	2–1
Flambeau de l'Est	3–2	1–2	1–0	—	1–1	1–1	0–2	1–1	2–1	0–0	2–2	3–2	2–0	3–1	1–2	3–0
Inter Star	0–0	1–0	1–4	1–0	—	1–1	1–1	1–2	0–3	1–2	1–1	1–0	0–1	2–1	0–2	1–1
LLB Sport 4 Africa	4–0	1–0	0–1	0–0	0–1	—	3–1	2–0	1–2	6–0	1–0	3–2	2–1	1–0	0–1	3–1
Le Messager Ngozi	3–0	0–0	0–1	2–0	0–1	1–0	—	2–0	1–0	3–1	3–2	2–0	3–2	2–0	0–2	1–1
Le Messager Bujumbura	4–1	0–1	2–2	4–1	1–0	0–0	1–1	—	0–1	0–0	0–1	0–1	0–1	1–1	1–3	0–1
Muzinga	3–5	0–3	1–1	0–0	1–0	0–1	1–1	0–2	—	1–1	0–0	1–0	1–1	0–1	0–0	1–1
Nyanza United	0–1	0–1	1–1	1–1	1–2	0–0	2–0	0–1	0–0	—	2–1	1–0	1–1	0–1	1–0	1–0
Olympic Star	2–0	0–1	1–2	0–0	1–1	0–1	1–1	0–1	1–1	2–0	—	0–0	1–0	0–0	1–2	0–0
Prince Louis	1–2	0–2	2–1	2–1	3–1	0–6	1–1	0–0	0–1	2–1	1–2	—	0–2	2–1	0–5	2–1
Royal de Muramvya	2–0	1–1	0–0	0–0	1–1	0–2	1–2	1–0	4–2	0–0	0–3	0–2	—	0–0	0–2	0–0
Rusizi	1–0	1–0	1–2	0–0	0–1	1–2	2–1	1–0	1–0	1–2	1–1	1–0	2–0	—	0–1	1–0
Vital'O	7–0	3–2	0–1	1–0	0–1	2–0	1–0	2–1	0–1	3–1	2–1	3–0	6–0	1–0	—	7–0
Volontaires	1–2	2–2	0–1	1–2	1–0	0–1	0–3	1–2	3–1	2–0	0–1	1–0	1–1	1–0	0–2	—

Source: Soccerway
Legend: Blue = home team win; Yellow = draw; Red = away team win.
