= 2015–16 Burundi Ligue A =

Burundi Ligue A
- Season: 2015–16
- Dates: 12 September 2015 – 12 May 2016
- Champions: Vital'O FC
- Relegated: Les Crocos; Les Jeunes Athlétiques; Les Eléphants
- Champions League: Vital'O FC
- Confederation Cup: Le Messager Ngozi
- Matches: 240
- Goals: 512 (2.13 per match)

The 2015–16 Burundi Ligue A season, also known as Primus Ligue for sponsorship reasons, was the 53rd edition of the top flight football competition in Burundi. The season began on 12 September 2015 and concluded on 12 May 2016. Vital'O successfully defended their title, winning their second consecutive league title and twentieth overall.

== Teams ==
A total of sixteen clubs participate in this season. Thirteen teams from previous season and three new promoted sides.

Promoted from Ligue B

- Les Crocos
- Olympic Muremera
- Les Eléphants

Relegated from Ligue A

- Prince Louis
- Volontaires
- Académie Tchité

Other changes

- Aigle Noir Makamba bought the place of Rusizi FC.
- Les Jeunes Athlétiques bought the place of Royal de Muramvya.

=== Stadiums and locations ===
Locations of teams in the 2014–15 Ligue A.

Team	Location	Stadium	Stadium capacity
Aigle Noir	Makamba	Stade Peace Park	35,000
Athlético Olympic	Bujumbura	Stade du Prince Louis Rwagasore	22,000
Bujumbura City	Bujumbura	Stade du Prince Louis Rwagasore	22,000
Flambeau de l'Est	Ruyigi	Stade de Ruyigi	2,000
Inter Star	Bujumbura	Stade du Prince Louis Rwagasore	22,000
LLB Sport 4 Africa	Bujumbura	Stade du Prince Louis Rwagasore	22,000
Le Messager Ngozi	Ngozi	Stade Urukundo	5,000
Le Messager Bujumbura	Bujumbura	Stade du Prince Louis Rwagasore	22,000
Les Crocos	Rumonge	Stade Onmisports Ivyizigiro	5,418
Les Eléphants	Bubanza	Stade Municipal de Bubanza	1,000
Les Jeunes Athlétiques	Bujumbura	Stade du Prince Louis Rwagasore	22,000
Muzinga	Bujumbura	Stade du Prince Louis Rwagasore	22,000
Nyanza United	Magara	Stade de football de Magara	1,000
Olympic Muremera	Ngozi	Stade Agasaka	4,000
Olympic Star Muyinga	Muyinga	Stade Municipal de Muyinga	10,000
Vital'O	Bujumbura	Stade du Prince Louis Rwagasore	22,000

== League table ==
Pos	Team	Pld	W	D	L	GF	GA	GD	Pts	Qualification or relegation
1	Vital'O (C)	30	24	2	4	71	17	+54	74	Qualification for the CAF Champions League
2	Le Messager Ngozi	30	16	9	5	40	19	+21	57	Qualification for the CAF Confederation Cup (Note: Le Messager Ngozi qualify for the CAF Confederation Cup as winners of the 2016 Coupe du Président de la République.)
3	Muzinga	30	15	8	7	41	21	+20	53	
4	Aigle Noir Makamba	30	11	14	5	33	21	+12	47	
5	LLB Sport 4 Africa	30	13	7	10	43	29	+14	46	
6	Bujumbura City	30	11	10	9	30	19	+11	43	
7	Athlético Olympic	30	10	12	8	36	29	+7	42	
8	Olympic Star Muyinga	30	10	11	9	26	26	0	41	
9	Flambeau de l'Est	30	9	10	11	30	33	−3	37	
10	Le Messager Bujumbura	30	8	10	12	25	41	−16	34	
11	Olympic Muremera	30	7	13	10	23	39	−16	34	
12	Nyanza United	30	6	13	11	32	44	−12	31	
13	Inter Star	30	7	9	14	22	35	−13	30	
14	Les Crocos (R)	30	7	8	15	18	35	−17	29	Relegation to Burundi Ligue B
15	Les Jeunes Athlétiques (R)	30	6	6	18	19	51	−32	24	Relegation to Burundi Ligue B
16	Les Eléphants (R)	30	3	12	15	23	53	−30	21	Relegation to Burundi Ligue B

Source: Soccerway
Rules for classification: 1st points; 2nd goal difference; 3rd goals scored.
(C) Champions; (R) Relegated
