= 2012–13 Burundi Ligue A =

Burundi Ligue A
- Season: 2012–13
- Dates: 17 November 2012 – 7 September 2013
- Champions: Flambeau de l'Est
- Champions League: Flambeau de l'Est
- Confederation Cup: Académie Tchité
- Matches: 132
- Goals: 330 (2.5 per match)

The 2012–13 Burundi Ligue A season, also known as the Primus Ligue for sponsorship reasons, was the 50th edition of the top flight football competition in Burundi. The season began on 17 November 2012 and was ended on 7 September 2013. Flambeau de l'Est claimed the title, marking the first time in Burundi football history that a club from the interior of the country has won the championship.

== Teams ==
A total of twelve clubs participate in this season. Ten teams from previous season and two new promoted sides.

Promoted from Ligue B

- Prince Louis FC
- Le Messager Ngozi

Relegated from Ligue A

- Kamenge FC
- Union Sporting Bujumbura

=== Stadiums and locations ===
Locations of teams in the 2014–15 Ligue A.

Team	Location	Stadium	Stadium capacity
Académie Tchité	Bujumbura	Stade du Prince Louis Rwagasore	22,000
Athlético Olympic	Bujumbura	Stade du Prince Louis Rwagasore	22,000
Espoir de Mutimbuzi	Gatumba	Stade Municipal de Gatumba	2,000
Flambeau de l'Est	Ruyigi	Stade de Ruyigi	2,000
Flamengo de Ngagara	Bujumbura	Stade du Prince Louis Rwagasore	22,000
Inter Star	Bujumbura	Stade du Prince Louis Rwagasore	22,000
LLB Académic	Bujumbura	Stade du Prince Louis Rwagasore	22,000
Le Messager Ngozi	Rumonge	Stade Onmisports Ivyizigiro	5,418
Muzinga	Bujumbura	Stade du Prince Louis Rwagasore	22,000
Prince Louis	Bujumbura	Stade du Prince Louis Rwagasore	22,000
Royal Muramvya	Muramvya	Stade Municipal de Muramvya	2,000
Vital'O	Bujumbura	Stade du Prince Louis Rwagasore	22,000

== League table ==
Pos	Team	Pld	W	D	L	GF	GA	GD	Pts	Qualification or relegation
1	Flambeau de l'Est (C)	22	13	8	1	31	8	+23	47	Qualification for the CAF Champions League
2	Athlético Olympic	22	13	4	5	41	19	+22	43	
3	LLB Académic	22	12	7	3	36	18	+18	43	
4	Vital'O	22	13	3	6	46	22	+24	42	
5	Le Messager Ngozi	22	8	7	7	26	25	+1	31	
6	Muzinga	22	9	3	10	30	29	+1	30	
7	Inter Star	22	8	6	8	29	28	+1	30	
8	Royal de Muramvya	22	7	8	7	22	23	−1	29	
9	Académie Tchité	22	7	6	9	19	30	−11	27	Qualification for the CAF Confederation Cup (Note: Académie Tchité qualify for the CAF Confederation Cup as the winner of the 2013 Coupe de la Confédération.)
10	Prince Louis	22	7	1	14	20	40	−20	22	
11	Flamengo de Ngagara	22	5	2	15	24	41	−17	17	Spared from relegation
12	Espoir de Mutimbuzi	22	1	3	18	6	47	−41	6	Spared from relegation

Source: Soccerway
Rules for classification: 1st points; 2nd goal difference; 3rd goals scored.
(C) Champions
