= 2017–18 Burundi Ligue A =

Burundi Ligue A
- Season: 2017–18
- Dates: 16 September 2017 – 27 May 2018
- Champions: Le Messager Ngozi
- Relegated: Inter Star; Les Jeunes Athlétiques; Delta Star Gatumba
- Champions League: Le Messager Ngozi
- Confederation Cup: Vital'O
- Matches played: 240
- Goals scored: 591 (2.46 per match)

The 2017–18 Burundi Ligue A season, also known as Primus Ligue for sponsorship reasons, was the 55th edition of the top flight football competition in Burundi. The season started on 16 September 2017 and ended on 27 May 2018.

== Teams ==
A total of sixteen clubs participate in this season. Thirteen teams from previous season and three new promoted sides.

Promoted from Ligue B

- Flambeau du Centre
- Les Jeunes Athlétiques
- Delta Star Gatumba

Relegated from Ligue A

- Magara Star
- Rusizi
- Muzinga

== League table ==
| Pos | Team | Pld | W | D | L | GF | GA | GD | Pts | Qualification or relegation |
|---|---|---|---|---|---|---|---|---|---|---|
| 1 | Le Messager Ngozi (C) | 30 | 22 | 4 | 4 | 52 | 24 | +28 | 70 | Qualification for the CAF Champions League |
| 2 | LLB Sport 4 Africa | 30 | 21 | 6 | 3 | 57 | 22 | +35 | 69 | |
| 3 | Aigle Noir Makamba | 30 | 16 | 11 | 3 | 66 | 32 | +34 | 59 | |
| 4 | Vital'O | 30 | 16 | 11 | 3 | 34 | 9 | +25 | 59 | Qualification for the CAF Confederation Cup (Note: Vital'O qualify for the CAF Confederation Cup as winners of the 2018 Coupe du Président de la République.) |
| 5 | Olympic Star Muyinga | 30 | 17 | 7 | 6 | 55 | 26 | +29 | 58 | |
| 6 | Bujumbura City | 30 | 13 | 5 | 12 | 32 | 30 | +2 | 44 | |
| 7 | Musongati | 30 | 10 | 11 | 9 | 38 | 30 | +8 | 41 | |
| 8 | Les Lierres | 30 | 12 | 4 | 14 | 38 | 35 | +3 | 40 | |
| 9 | Flambeau du Centre | 30 | 11 | 6 | 13 | 43 | 45 | −2 | 39 | |
| 10 | Flambeau de l'Est | 30 | 10 | 7 | 13 | 30 | 32 | −2 | 37 | |
| 11 | Athlético Olympique | 30 | 9 | 5 | 16 | 33 | 44 | −11 | 32 | |
| 12 | Ngozi City | 30 | 7 | 9 | 14 | 24 | 35 | −11 | 30 | |
| 13 | Le Messager Bujumbura | 30 | 7 | 9 | 14 | 32 | 48 | −16 | 30 | |
| 14 | Inter Star (R) | 30 | 7 | 5 | 18 | 22 | 41 | −19 | 26 | Relegation to Burundi Ligue B |
| 15 | Les Jeunes Athlétiques (R) | 30 | 4 | 8 | 18 | 22 | 63 | −41 | 20 | Relegation to Burundi Ligue B |
| 16 | Delta Star Gatumba (R) | 30 | 1 | 6 | 23 | 13 | 75 | −62 | 9 | Relegation to Burundi Ligue B |

Source: Soccerway
Rules for classification: 1) points; 2) head-to-head points; 3) head-to-head goal difference; 4) head-to-head goals scored; 5) head-to-head away goals scored; 6) goal difference; 7) goals scored;
(C) Champions; (R) Relegated

== See also ==
- 2018 Burundian Cup
