= 2013–14 Burundi Ligue A =

Burundi Ligue A
- Season: 2013–14
- Dates: 21 December 2013 – 6 July 2014
- Champions: LLB Académic
- Relegated: Espoir de Mutimbuzi; Flamengo de Ngagara
- Champions League: LLB Académic
- Confederation Cup: Le Messager Ngozi
- Matches: 181
- Goals: 421 (2.33 per match)
- Biggest home win: Guêpiers du Lac 4-0 Volontaires

The 2013–14 Burundi Ligue A season, also known as the Amstel Ligue for sponsorship reasons, was the 51st edition of the top flight football competition in Burundi. The season began on 21 December 2013 and was ended on 6 July 2014. Flambeau de l’Est the champions from the previous season were stripped of their title due to match fixing, and LLB Académic were awarded the title.

== Teams ==
A total of fourteen clubs participate in this season. Twelve teams from previous season and two new promoted sides.

Promoted from Ligue B

- Guêpiers du Lac
- Volontaires

Relegated from Ligue A

- —

=== Stadiums and locations ===
Locations of teams in the 2014–15 Ligue A.

Team	Location	Stadium	Stadium capacity
Académie Tchité	Bujumbura	Stade du Prince Louis Rwagasore	22,000
Athlético Olympic	Bujumbura	Stade du Prince Louis Rwagasore	22,000
Espoir de Mutimbuzi	Gatumba	Stade Municipal de Gatumba	2,000
Flambeau de l'Est	Ruyigi	Stade de Ruyigi	2,000
Flamengo de Ngagara	Bujumbura	Stade du Prince Louis Rwagasore	22,000
Guêpiers du Lac	Bujumbura	Stade du Prince Louis Rwagasore	22,000
Inter Star	Bujumbura	Stade du Prince Louis Rwagasore	22,000
LLB Académic	Bujumbura	Stade du Prince Louis Rwagasore	22,000
Le Messager Ngozi	Rumonge	Stade Onmisports Ivyizigiro	5,418
Muzinga	Bujumbura	Stade du Prince Louis Rwagasore	22,000
Prince Louis	Bujumbura	Stade du Prince Louis Rwagasore	22,000
Royal Muramvya	Muramvya	Stade Municipal de Muramvya	2,000
Vital'O	Bujumbura	Stade du Prince Louis Rwagasore	22,000
Volontaires	Kanyosha	Stade de Kanyosha	1,000

== League table ==
Pos	Team	Pld	W	D	L	GF	GA	GD	Pts	Qualification or relegation
1	LLB Académic (C)	26	17	8	1	45	9	+36	59	Qualification for the CAF Champions League
2	Flambeau de l'Est	26	17	5	4	44	13	+31	56	
3	Inter Star	25	15	6	4	55	13	+42	51	
4	Le Messager Ngozi	26	15	5	6	45	23	+22	50	Qualification for the CAF Confederation Cup (Note: Le Messager Ngozi qualify for the CAF Confederation Cup as a runners-up of the 2014 Coupe du Président de la République.)
5	Vital'O	26	13	5	8	31	18	+13	44	
6	Athlético Olympic	26	12	4	10	23	20	+3	40	
7	Prince Louis	26	10	9	7	32	27	+5	39	
8	Guêpiers du Lac	25	9	9	7	30	21	+9	36	
9	Académie Tchité	26	8	6	12	19	28	−9	30	
10	Muzinga	26	7	6	13	30	37	−7	27	
11	Royal de Muramvya	26	7	6	13	21	41	−20	27	
12	Volontaires	26	4	7	15	15	54	−39	19	
13	Espoir de Mutimbuzi (R)	26	2	5	19	16	63	−47	11	Relegation to Burundi Ligue B
14	Flamengo de Ngagara (R)	26	1	7	18	15	54	−39	10	Relegation to Burundi Ligue B

Source: Soccerway
Rules for classification: 1st points; 2nd goal difference; 3rd goals scored.
(C) Champions; (R) Relegated
