= 2016–17 Burundi Ligue A =

Burundi Ligue A
- Season: 2016–17
- Dates: 10 September 2016 – 21 May 2017
- Champions: LLB Sports 4 Africa
- Relegated: Magara Star; Rusizi; Muzinga
- Champions League: LLB Sports 4 Africa
- Confederation Cup: Olympic Star Muyinga
- Matches: 240
- Goals: 509 (2.12 per match)

The 2016–17 Burundi Ligue A season, also known as Primus Ligue for sponsorship reasons, was the 54th edition of the top flight football competition in Burundi. The season began on 10 September 2016 and concluded on 21 May 2017. Vital'O were the defending champion. LLB Sport 4 Africa won its second league title.

== Teams ==
A total of sixteen clubs participate in this season. Thirteen teams from previous season and three new promoted sides.

Promoted from Ligue B

- Rusizi
- Les Lierres
- Musongati

Relegated from Ligue A

- Les Crocos
- Les Jeunes Athlétiques
- Les Eléphants

Other changes

- Olympic Muremera was renamed as Ngozi City FC.

== League table ==
Pos	Team	Pld	W	D	L	GF	GA	GD	Pts	Qualification or relegation
1	LLB Sport 4 Africa (C)	30	21	5	4	58	16	+42	68	Qualification for the CAF Champions League
2	Athlético Olympic	30	18	6	6	43	15	+28	60	
3	Vital'O	30	15	12	3	46	15	+31	57	
4	Aigle Noir Makamba	30	15	10	5	32	16	+16	55	
5	Musongati	30	12	13	5	47	25	+22	49	
6	Le Messager Ngozi	30	13	8	9	31	23	+8	47	
7	Olympic Star Muyinga	30	10	9	11	22	31	−9	39	Qualification for the CAF Confederation Cup (Note: Olympic Star Muyinga qualify for the CAF Confederation Cup as winners of the 2017 Coupe du Président de la République.)
8	Bujumbura City	30	9	10	11	28	31	−3	37	
9	Les Lierres	30	8	10	12	33	40	−7	34	
10	Le Messager Bujumbura	30	8	9	13	26	35	−9	33	
11	Flambeau de l'Est	30	8	8	14	27	35	−8	32	
12	Ngozi City	30	6	14	10	19	33	−14	32	
13	Inter Star	30	7	8	15	20	47	−27	29	
14	Magara Star (R)	30	7	6	17	32	47	−15	27	Relegation to Burundi Ligue B
15	Rusizi (R)	30	7	5	18	31	54	−23	26	Relegation to Burundi Ligue B
16	Muzinga (R)	30	4	11	15	14	46	−32	23	Relegation to Burundi Ligue B

Source: Soccerway
Rules for classification: 1st points; 2nd goal difference; 3rd goals scored.
(C) Champions; (R) Relegated
