= Shassiri Nahimana =

Burundian footballer

Personal information
- Full name: Shassiri Nahimana
- Date of birth: 5 August 1993 (age 33)
- Place of birth: Bujumbura, Burundi
- Height: 1.65 m (5 ft 5 in)
- Position: Midfielder

Team information
- Current team: Bandari Fc

Youth career
- 2005: Rafina FC
- 2009–2010: Havana FC

Senior career*
Years	Team	Apps	(Gls)
2012–2014	Inter Star		
2014–2016	Vital'O		
2016–2018	Rayon Sports		
2018–2019	Nizwa		
2019	Al-Mujazzal		
2019–2020	Al-Entesar		
2020	Futuro Kings		
2021–	Vital'O		

International career^{‡}
2013–	Burundi	40	(2)
- * Club domestic league appearances and goals ‡ National team caps and goals as of 27 January 2024

Shassiri Nahimana (born 5 August 1993) is a Burundian professional footballer who plays as a midfielder for KPL club Bandari and the Burundi national team.

== Early life ==
Shassiri Nahimana was born in Buyenzi, Bujumbura. Nahimana is the third born among his siblings and grew up playing football. Supported by his parents, in 2005, at the age of 12 he joined Rafina FC. Few years later in 2009–2010 he joined Havana FC, where he participated in a local competition and was soon scouted by Inter Star to attend a trial at the club. Though initially scared, he eventually attended the trials and got signed up by the club.

== Club career ==
After first joining Inter Star in 2012, he went to Vital'O in 2014, where he won two consecutive Burundi Premier League in the 2014–15 and 2015–16 season. At the end of the 2015–16 season, Nahimana was named the Best Player of the Season, winning the award over teammates Arakaza MacArthur and Hussein Shabani. He also played a pivotal role in his teams 2016 Burundian Cup run, where Vital'O lost 4–3 on penalties to Le Messager Ngozi in the final.

After a successful career at Vital'O, he joined Rwandan club Rayon Sports in 2016. On 24 December 2016, he scored his first hat-trick for Rayon Sports, thrashing Musanze 4–1. On 17 May 2019, he won the 2016–17 Rwanda Premier League with the club, after Rayon won 2–1 against Mukura Victory Sports and took an unassailable 13 point lead over rivals and former champions APR FC, with four matches to spare.

At the end of the 2017–18 season, Nahimana joined Omani club Nizwa, and in January 2019 moved to Saudi club Al-Mujazzal on a 1-year deal.

== International career ==
Nahimana was invited by Lofty Naseem, the national team coach, to represent Burundi in the 2014 African Nations Championship held in South Africa.

On 21 June 2015, he scored his first ever international goal in a 2–1 win against Djibouti in the 2016 African Nations Championship qualification. Burundi progressed to the next round by winning 4–1 on aggregate, but failed to qualify for the finals after losing 3–2 on aggregate to Ethiopia in the next round.

On 11 June 2019, Nahimana was named in Burundi's 23-man squad for the 2019 Africa Cup of Nations in Egypt.

=== Stats ===
As of 23 June 2019

National team	Year	Apps	Goals
Burundi	2013	1	0
Burundi	2014	2	0
Burundi	2015	12	1
Burundi	2016	4	0
Burundi	2017	6	1
Burundi	2018	4	0
Burundi	2019	1	0
Total		30	2

=== International goals ===
Scores and results list Uganda's goal tally first.

No.	Date	Venue	Opponent	Score	Result	Competition
1.	21 June 2015	Stade du Ville, Djibouti City, Djibouti	Djibouti	2–1	2–1	2016 African Nations Championship qualification
2.	7 December 2017	Bukhungu Stadium, Kakamega, Kenya	Ethiopia	4–1	4–1	2017 CECAFA Cup

== Honours ==
=== Club ===
Vital'O

- Burundi Premier League (2): 2014–15, 2015–16

Rayon Sports

- Rwanda Premier League (1): 2016–17

=== Individual ===
- Amstel Ligue Best Player of the Season: 2015–16
