= Jimmy Ndayizeye =

Burundian footballer and manager

Personal information
- Date of birth: 23 December 1976 (age 49)
- Place of birth: Ngozi, Burundi
- Height: 1.80 m (5 ft 11 in)
- Position: Defender

Senior career*
Years	Team	Apps	(Gls)
1995–2000	Prince Louis		
2001	Atlético Olympic		
2002	Prince Louis		
2003–2006	Kiyovu Sports		

International career
2002–2004	Burundi	10	(0)

Managerial career
- 2008–2014: Académie Tchité
- 2016–2018: Espoir
- Le Messager
- 2020–2022: Burundi
Medal record
Men's football
Representing Burundi
CECAFA Cup
Runner-up	2004 Ethiopia
- * Club domestic league appearances and goals

Jimmy Ndayizeye (born 23 December 1976) is a Burundian football manager and former player who last managed the Burundi national team.

== Club career ==
Ndayizeye began his career at Burundian club Prince Louis, before signing for Atlético Olympic in 2001, and before returning to Prince Louis in 2002. In 2003, Ndayizeye signed for Rwandan club Kiyovu Sports, playing for the club for four seasons, before retiring in 2006.

== International career ==
Ndayizeye made ten caps for the Burundi national team, making his debut on 13 October 2002 in a 2–0 loss against South Africa.

== Managerial career ==
In 2008, Ndayizeye was appointed manager of Académie Tchité. Ndayizeye stayed with the club for six years, winning the 2013 Burundian Cup with Académie Tchité. In August 2016, Rwandan club Espoir hired Ndayizeye. On 22 March 2018, Ndayizeye was sacked as manager of Espoir.

In 2020, after a spell with Burundian club Le Messager, Ndayizeye was appointed manager of Burundi.

== Honours ==
Burundi

- CECAFA Cup: Runner-up, 2004
