= Alain Ndizeye =

Burundian defender (born 1986)

Personal information
- Full name: Alain Bangama Ndizeye
- Date of birth: 20 December 1986 (age 39)
- Place of birth: Bujumbura, Burundi
- Height: 5 ft 6 in (1.68 m)
- Position: Defender

Team information
- Current team: AS Inter Star

Senior career*
Years	Team	Apps	(Gls)
1999–2000	Chanic	25	(0)
2000–2002	SC Kiyovu Sport	55	(0)
2002	Prince Louis FC	20	(0)
2003–2004	Atlético Olympic	19	(0)
2005–2007	Vital'O F.C.	73	(8)
2008–	AS Inter Star	45	(1)

International career
2003–2008	Burundi	18	(1)
- * Club domestic league appearances and goals

Alain Bangama Ndizeye (born 20 December 1986 in Bujumbura) is a Burundian defender who plays with AS Inter Star in the Burundi Premier League.

== Club career ==
Bangama began his career in the Burundian first division, playing with the side from Chanic from 1999 to 2000. After a two-year stint, he joined Rwandan side SC Kiyovu Sport for two years.

Bangama returned to Burundi where he played for several clubs from the capital Bujumburu. From 2002 to 2003 he played for Prince Louis FC, from 2003 to 2005, he played for Atletico. In 2005, he joined Vital'O F.C.

After two years with Vital'O F.C., he signed in winter 2008 for AS Inter Star.

== International career ==
Bangama has made several appearances for the Burundi national football team, including FIFA World Cup qualifiers.
