= Laudit Mavugo =

Burundian footballer

Personal information
- Full name: Laudit Mavugo
- Date of birth: 10 October 1993 (age 33)
- Place of birth: Bujumbura, Burundi
- Height: 1.82 m (6 ft 0 in)
- Position: Forward

Senior career*
Years	Team	Apps	(Gls)
2010–2011	Muzinga		
2011–2012	Police Kibungo		
2012–2013	AS Kigali		
2013–2014	Kiyovu Sports		
2014–2016	Vital'O		
2016–2018	Simba		
2018–2019	Tshakhuma		
2019–2022	NAPSA Stars		
2022–2023	Police Kibungo		

International career^{‡}
2011–2019	Burundi	22	(5)
- * Club domestic league appearances and goals ‡ National team caps and goals as of 27 January 2024

Laudit Mavugo (born 10 October 1993) was a Burundian footballer. He was a member of the Burundi national football team.

== International career ==
=== International goals ===
Scores and results list Burundi's goal tally first.

No	Date	Venue	Opponent	Score	Result	Competition
1.	29 February 2012	Prince Louis Rwagasore Stadium, Bujumbura, Burundi	Zimbabwe	1–0	2–1	2013 Africa Cup of Nations qualification
2.	17 October 2015	Prince Louis Rwagasore Stadium, Bujumbura, Burundi	Ethiopia	1–0	2–0	2016 African Nations Championship qualification
3.	17 October 2015	Prince Louis Rwagasore Stadium, Bujumbura, Burundi	Ethiopia	2–0	2–0	2016 African Nations Championship qualification
4.	28 March 2017	National Stadium, Dar es Salaam, Tanzania	Tanzania	1–1	1–2	Friendly
5.	7 December 2017	Bukhungu Stadium, Kakamega, Kenya	Ethiopia	3–1	4–1	2017 CECAFA Cup

== Honours ==
=== Individual ===
- Zambia Super League Top scorer: 2019
