= Pierre Kwizera =

Burundian footballer

Personal information
- Full name: Pierre Kwizera
- Date of birth: 16 April 1991 (age 35)
- Place of birth: Burundi
- Height: 1.71 m (5 ft 7 in)
- Position: Midfielder

Team information
- Current team: Rayon Sports F.C.

Senior career*
Years	Team	Apps	(Gls)
2011–2013	Atlético Olympic F.C.		
2015–	Rayon Sports F.C.		

International career^{‡}
2009–2019	Burundi	45	(3)
- * Club domestic league appearances and goals as of 10:16, 30 March 2016 (UTC) ‡ National team caps and goals as of 10:16, 27 January 2024 (UTC)

Pierre Kwizera (born 16 April 1991) is a Burundian professional footballer, who plays as a midfielder for Rayon Sports F.C.

== International career ==
=== International goals ===
Scores and results list Burundi's goal tally first.

No	Date	Venue	Opponent	Score	Result	Competition
1.	29 March 2016	Sam Nujoma Stadium, Windhoek, Namibia	Namibia	1–1	3–1	2017 Africa Cup of Nations qualification
2.	7 December 2017	Bukhungu Stadium, Kakamega, Kenya	Ethiopia	1–0	4–1	2017 CECAFA Cup
3.	17 December 2017	Kenyatta Stadium, Machakos, Kenya	Uganda	1–0	1–2	2017 CECAFA Cup

== Honours ==
Best Player of the Year

- Rwanda Premier League : 2015–2016

Atlético Olympic

Runner-up

- Burundi Premier League (2): 2011–12, 2012–13
