= List of football clubs in Burundi =

This is a list of football (soccer) clubs in Burundi. For a complete list see Category:Football clubs in Burundi

== A ==
- AS Inter Star
- Atlético Olympic F.C.

== F ==
- Flambeau de l’Est
- Flamengo de Ngagara

== L ==
- Lydia Ludic Burundi Académic FC

== P ==
- Prince Louis F.C.

== V ==
- Vital'O FC
