= Blaise Bigirimana =

Burundian footballer

Personal information
- Date of birth: 4 November 1998 (age 27)
- Height: 1.90 m (6 ft 3 in)
- Position: Forward

Team information
- Current team: Kinondoni MC

Senior career*
Years	Team	Apps	(Gls)
2013-2014	Flambeau de l'Est		(10)
2014-2015	Bujumbura City		(15)
2015-2016	Atlético Olimpic		(17)
2016–2017	Kiyovu Sports		(15)
2017–2018	Stand United		(10)
2018–2019	Alliance Academy		(11)
2019–2022	Namungo	16	(15)
2022-	Kinondoni MC		

International career^{‡}
2020–	Burundi	9	(3)
- * Club domestic league appearances and goals as of 22 November 2022 ‡ National team caps and goals as of 12 November 2023

Blaise Bigirimana (born 4 November 1998) is a Burundian football striker who plays for Namungo.
