= 2018 Burundian Cup =

Tournament details
- Country: Burundi

Final positions
- Champions: Vital'O

The 2018 Coupe du Président de la République is the 7th edition of the Coupe du Président de la République (excluding earlier cup competitions), the knockout football competition of Burundi.

== Preliminary round ==
[Jan 26]

Gitaza Star 3-1 Santos FC

== First round ==
[Feb 2]

Kayanza United 4-0 New Force

Kiganda City 1-12 Vital'ô

Les Éléphants 2-2 New Oil FC [3-4 pen]

Rumonge City 3-0 Kalifumu FC

Bujumbura City 4-0 Mangara Young Boys

Messager Bujumbura 0-1 LLB S4A

Flambeau de l'Est 1-1 Moso Sugar [6-5 pen]

Les Crocos 1-1 Etoile du Nord [5-4 pen]

Les Jeunes Athlétiques 2-3 Lumière de Mwumba

Inter Star 4-2 Top Junior

[Feb 3]

Ruyigi City 1-3 Athletico Olympic

Bumamuru 1-0 Magara Star

Musongati FC 3-0 Ngozi City

Busoni Star 1-0 Les Envoyés

Volontaires 1-0 Commerçants de Ngozi

Burundi Sport Dynamik 11-0 Lumière de Moso

Panthère Cancuzo 0-0 Butare City [3-1 pen]

Muramvya City 3-1 JC Regina Mundi

Aigle Noir Kigwena 1-5 Les Lierres

Club Kiremba Bururi 5-1 Intaramvya FC Kinyinya

[Feb 4]

Pigeon du Centre 3-0 Butaganzwa FC de Ruyigi

Transport FC 8-0 Bweru FC

Muzinga FC 2-0 Mapenzi FC

Unité FC 1-2 Rukinzo FC

Santé FC de Ngozi 0-0 Espoir de Gatumba [5-4 pen]

Rusizi FC 1-2 Delta Star

Flambeau du Centre 2-5 Aigle Noir Makamba

Agakura FC de Mwaro 0-22 Messager Ngozi

Freedom de Ruyigi 1-0 Gatete FC

Malaika FC 3-2 Bioénergie FC

Olympic Star de Muyinga 4-0 Gitaza Star

== Second round ==
[Mar 2]

Kayanza United 0-2 Vital'ô

Volontaires 0-1 Burundi Sport Dynamik

Lumière de Mwumba 0-1 Inter Star

Flambeau de l'Est 4-1 Les Crocos

Athletico Olympic 4-0 Bumamuru

[Mar 3]

Musongati FC 3-1 Busoni Star

Transport FC 0-1 Muzinga FC

Club Kiremba Bururi 1-2 Pigeon du Centre [later awarded to Kiremba]

Malaika 0-8 Olympic Star

Panthère 0-0 Muramvya City [0-3 pen]

[Mar 4]

Club Matana 0-2 Delta Star

Aigle Noir Makamba 1-1 Les Lierres [5-4 pen]

Rukinzo FC 1-2 Santé FC de Ngozi

Messager Ngozi 11-0 Freedom de Gisuru

New Oli FC 0-1 Rumonge City

Bujumbura City 0-2 LLB S4A

== Round of 16 ==
[May 1]

Aigle Noir Makamba 4-1 Inter Star

Rumonge City 0-0 Vital'ô [2-4 pen]

LLB S4A 2-0 Flambeau de l'Est

Delta Star 5-2 Santé FC de Ngozi

[May 2]

Athletico Olympic 1-2 Musongati FC

Club Kiremba Bururi 0-1 Muzinga FC

Burundi Sport Dynamik 5-1 Muramvya City

Messager Ngozi 0-1 Olympic Star

== Quarter-finals ==
[May 29]

Vital'ô 0-0 LLB S4A [aet, 3-1 pen]

Musongati FC 0-2 Burundi Sport Dynamik

[May 30]

Muzinga FC 0-2 Delta Star

Aigle Noir Makamba 0-1 Olympic Star de Muyinga

== Semi-finals ==
[Jun 2]

Vital'ô 2-1 Burundi Sport Dynamik

[Jun 3]

Delta Star 4-0 Olympic Star de Muyinga

== Final ==
[Jun 23, Gitega]

Vital'ô 3-1 Delta Star

== See also ==
- 2017–18 Burundi Premier League
