= Musongati Gitega FC =

Musongati (Musongati FC)
- Full name: Musongati Gitega Football Club (Musongati Gitega)
- Nickname(s): Musongati
- Founded: July 29 (1982)
- Ground: Ingoma, Stade, Gitega
- Capacity: 7,000
- Chairman: Dennis Karera
- League: Burundi Ligue A
- Website: https://www.owsports.info/sites/primusleague/teams/241375
Home colours	Away colours	Third colours

Musongati Gitega Football Club, also known as Musongati Football Club, is a football club based in Gitega, Burundi. The club currently plays in the first division, Burundi Ligue A.

== Squad ==
As of 12 August 2022

Note: Flags indicate national team as defined under FIFA eligibility rules; some limited exceptions apply. Players may hold more than one non-FIFA nationality.

No.	Pos.	Nation	Player
18	MF	(Burundi) BDI	Allidou Hakizimana
3	MF	(Burundi) BDI	Chris Ndikumana
28	DF	(Burundi) BDI	Barros Tambwe
17	DF	(Burundi) BDI	David Sinbagiye
12	DF	(Burundi) BDI	Djuma Muhamedi
2	DF	(Burundi) BDI	Franck Nduwimana
15	MF	(Burundi) BDI	Hamissi Harerimana
4	DF	(Burundi) BDI	Iddy Karikumutima
22	GK	(Burundi) BDI	Ismail Wilonja
13	MF	(Burundi) BDI	Issa Hubert Nsabimana
23	MF	(Burundi) BDI	Desire Nduwimana

No.	Pos.	Nation	Player
20	MF	(Burundi) BDI	Issa Modela
5	DF	(Burundi) BDI	Josue Alberto Mugisha
11	DF	(Burundi) BDI	Kessy Jordan Nimbona
1	GK	(Burundi) BDI	Laurent Sakubu
7	MF	(Burundi) BDI	Mossi Nduwumwe
16	MF	(Burundi) BDI	Numbe Ndayishimiye
10	MF	(Burundi) BDI	Selemahi Halidi
6	DF	(Burundi) BDI	Tresor Mubango
19	FW	(Burundi) BDI	Tresor Shaka
21	DF	(Burundi) BDI	Valentin Nestor Bizimana
14	MF	(Burundi) BDI	Hassan Harerimana

== Honours ==
=== Domestic competitions ===
Ligue A runners-up (1): 2019/2020

- FA Cup
  - Champions (1): 2020

== See also ==
=== CAF Competition ===
CAF (1): 2020

- Preliminary round: Green Eagles (Zambia)

Home: Musongati 2-2 Green Eagles Away: Green Eagles 2-1 Musongati
