= Murushid Juuko =

Ugandan footballer (born 1994)

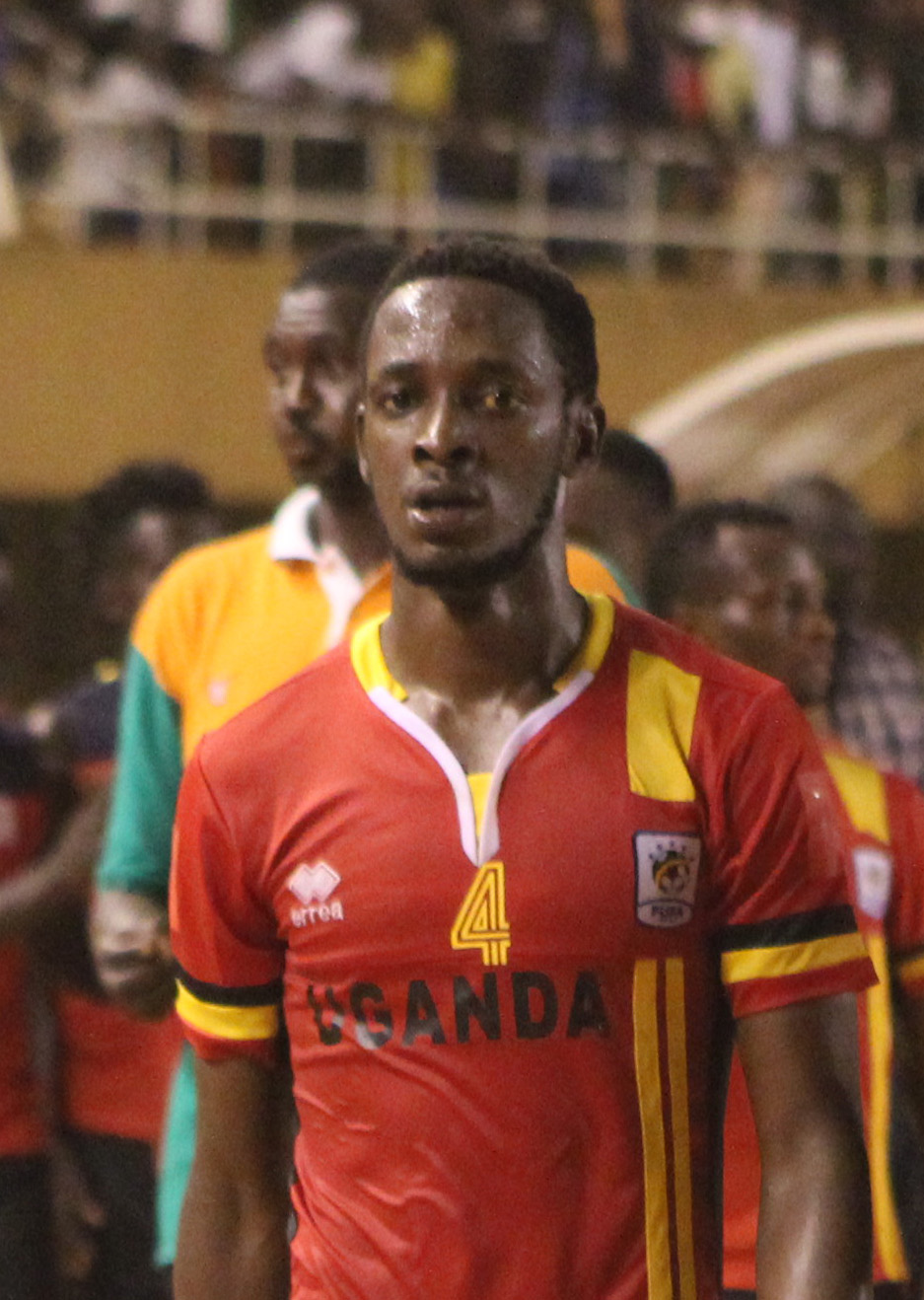
- Juuko with Uganda in 2018

Personal information
- Date of birth: 14 April 1994 (age 32)
- Place of birth: Entebbe, Uganda
- Height: 1.85 m (6 ft 1 in)
- Position: Centre-back

Team information
- Current team: Express FC

Senior career*
Years	Team	Apps	(Gls)
2009–2012	Bunamwaya	32	(2)
2013–2014	Victoria University	36	(5)
2014–2019	Simba	149	(7)
2019	Wydad	0	(0)
2020–	Express FC		

International career^{‡}
2011–2012	Uganda U20	2	(0)
2013	Uganda U23	4	(0)
2014–	Uganda	39	(1)
Medal record
Bunamwaya
Winner	Uganda Premier League	2010–11
Victoria University
Runner-up	Uganda Cup	2013
Winner	CECAFA Nile Basin Cup	2014
Simba S.C.
Winner	Mapinduzi Cup	2015
Winner	Tanzania FA Cup	2017
Winner	Tanzanian Premier League	2017–18
Uganda
Winner	CECAFA Cup	2015
- * Club domestic league appearances and goals as of 1 October 2020 ‡ National team caps and goals as of 07:58, 20 May 2021 (UTC)

Murushid Juuko (born 14 April 1994) is a Ugandan professional footballer who plays as a centre back for Express FC. Juuko also played for the senior national team of Uganda usually called 'The Cranes' and appeared in 39 matches and scored 1 goal before hanging up his boots on 13 January 2022. He was part of the Ugandan team that played at the 2017 AFCON in Gabon and also appeared in the same tournament played in Egypt in 2019. Before those tournaments, Uganda had spent 38 years without participating in the continent's biggest football tournament.

== Club career ==
Juuko was born in Entebbe, Wakiso District. He has played club football for Ugandan clubs Bunamwaya and SC Victoria University before moving to Tanzania to play for Simba.He also played for Wydad Cassablanca in Morocco

Juuko joined Express FC in 2020 on a one-year contract.

== International career ==
Juuko made his Uganda national team (the "Cranes") debut on 11 July 2014 against Seychelles national team. Uganda national team won 1-0.

=== AFCON 2017 ===
Juuko guided the Cranes to their first Africa Cup of Nations finals since 1978. He was part of the team that defeated Comoros 1–0 to qualify for the 2017 finals in Gabon. Having missed the first game against Ghana due to a suspension picked up during qualifiers he played 180 minutes against Egypt and Mali.

=== AFCON 2019 ===
During the 2019 Africa Cup of Nations Juuko played two matches, the first one against DR Congo and another against Senegal after sustaining a hamstring injury. The Uganda Cranes ended the championship in the round of 16.

== Career statistics ==
=== International ===
As of matches played 20 May 2021.

National team	Year	Apps	Goals
Uganda	2014	1	0
Uganda	2015	8	0
Uganda	2016	9	0
Uganda	2017	7	0
Uganda	2018	6	1
Uganda	2019	6	0
Uganda	2021	2	0
Total		39	1

=== International goals ===
Scores and results list Uganda's goal tally first.

No	Date	Venue	Opponent	Score	Result	Competition
1.	24 March 2018	Mandela National Stadium, Bweyogerere, Uganda	São Tomé and Príncipe	2–0	3–1	Friendly

== Honors ==
Vipers

- Ugandan Premier League: 2010

SC Victoria University

- CECAFA Nile Basin Cup: 2014
- Ugandan Cup: 2013–14

Simba

- Tanzanian Premier League: 2017–18, 2018–19
- Kombe la Shirikisho la Azam (Azam Sports Federation Cup – ASFC): 2017
- Kombe La Mapinduzi: 2015
- SportPesa Super Cup: 2017, 2018

== Outside Football ==
Juuko is an entrepreneur who owns a farm, a bakery and also set up Jusa training school that trainers learners in vocational skills such as baking and cosmetology.
