= Eric Gatoto =

Burundian footballer

Personal information
- Date of birth: 1 April 1984 (age 42)
- Place of birth: Gitega, Burundi
- Position: Forward

Senior career*
Years	Team	Apps	(Gls)
–2007	Musongati		
2008–2013	Vital'O		(18)
2013–2019	Flambeau de l'Est		

International career
2009	Burundi	4	(1)
- * Club domestic league appearances and goals

Eric Gatoto (born 1 April 1984) is a Burundian former professional footballer who played as a forward.

He became top goalscorer of the 2008 Burundi Premier League.
