= 2017 CECAFA Cup =

CECAFA Senior Challenge Cup

Tournament details
- Host country: Kenya
- Dates: 3–17 December
- Teams: 9 (from 2 sub-confederations)
- Venues: 3 (in 3 host cities)

Final positions
- Champions: Kenya (7th title)
- Runners-up: Zanzibar
- Third place: Uganda
- Fourth place: Burundi

Tournament statistics
- Matches played: 20
- Goals scored: 41 (2.05 per match)
- Top scorer: (Uganda) Derrick Nsibambi (4 goals)

The 2017 CECAFA Cup was the 39th edition of the annual CECAFA Cup, an international football competition consisting of the national teams of member nations of the Council for East and Central Africa Football Associations (CECAFA). It took place in Kenya in December 2017.

== Participants ==
The following teams were confirmed to be participating in the tournament. National teams from Libya and Zimbabwe will participate in place of Djibouti and Eritrea. Zambia were to replace to Eritrea but later pulled out of the competition. Somalia and Sudan also withdrew from the tournament in mid November. Zimbabwe withdrew in November 2017.

National Team	FIFA Ranking (November 2017)
Burundi	138
Ethiopia	145
Kenya	111
Libya (Guest)	77
Rwanda	120
South Sudan	152
Tanzania	142
Uganda	74
Zanzibar	N/A

== Match officials ==
The match officials, which included 8 referees and 8 assistant referees, were announced on November 17, 2017.

Referees

- George Gatogato (Burundi)
- Twagirumukiza Abdoul Karim (Rwanda)
- Peter Waweru (Kenya)
- Antony Ogwayo (Kenya)
- Alex Muhabi (Uganda)
- Nassor Mfaume (Zanzibar)
- Sassy Elly Ally (Tanzania)
- Malong Ring Akech (South Sudan)

== Venues ==
Town	Kakamega	Kisumu	Machakos
Stadium	Bukhungu Stadium	Moi Stadium	Kenyatta Stadium

== Group stage ==
=== Group A ===
Pos	Team	Pld	W	D	L	GF	GA	GD	Pts	Qualification
1	Kenya (H)	4	2	2	0	3	0	+3	8	Advance to knockout stage
2	Zanzibar	4	2	1	1	5	3	+2	7	Advance to knockout stage
3	Libya	4	1	3	0	1	0	+1	6	
4	Rwanda	4	1	1	2	3	6	−3	4	
5	Tanzania	4	0	1	3	2	5	−3	1	

Source: CECAFA
Rules for classification: 1) Points; 2) Goal difference; 3) Number of goals scored;
(H) Hosts
3 December 2017
14:00

Kenya	2–0	Rwanda
Juma 27'; Otieno 39'	Report

Bukhungu Stadium, Kakamega
Referee: Mfaume Ali Nassoro (Zanzibar)
3 December 2017
16:00

Libya	0–0	Tanzania
	Report

Kenyatta Stadium, Machakos
Referee: Alex Muhabi (Uganda)

5 December 2017
14:00

Zanzibar	3–1	Rwanda
Yahya 35'; Issa 54'; Suleiman 87'	Report	Hakizimana 47'

Kenyatta Stadium, Machakos
Referee: Malong Ring Akech (South Sudan)
5 December 2017
16:00

Kenya	0–0	Libya
	Report

Kenyatta Stadium, Machakos
Referee: George Gatogato (Burundi)

7 December 2017
14:00

Tanzania	1–2	Zanzibar
Mkami 29'	Report	Suleiman 67'; Ahmada 79'

Kenyatta Stadium, Machakos
Referee: Twagirumukiza Abdoul Karim (Rwanda)
7 December 2017
16:00

Rwanda	0–0	Libya
	Report

Kenyatta Stadium, Machakos
Referee: Alex Muhabi (Uganda)

9 December 2017
14:00

Rwanda	2–1	Tanzania
Nshuti 18'; Biramahire 66'	Report	Lyanga 30'

Kenyatta Stadium, Machakos
Referee: Malong Ring Akech (South Sudan)
9 December 2017
16:00

Kenya	0–0	Zanzibar
	Report

Kenyatta Stadium, Machakos
Referee: George Gatogato (Burundi)

11 December 2017
14:00

Libya	1–0	Zanzibar
Al Harish 25'	Report

Kenyatta Stadium, Machakos
Referee: Twagirumukiza Abdoul Karim (Rwanda)
11 December 2017
16:00

Kenya	1–0	Tanzania
Oburu 20'	Report

Kenyatta Stadium, Machakos
Referee: Alex Muhabi (Uganda)

=== Group B ===
Pos	Team	Pld	W	D	L	GF	GA	GD	Pts	Qualification
1	Uganda	3	1	2	0	6	2	+4	5	Advance to knockout stage
2	Burundi	3	1	2	0	4	1	+3	5	Advance to knockout stage
3	Ethiopia	3	1	1	1	5	5	0	4	
4	South Sudan	3	0	1	2	1	8	−7	1	

Source: CECAFA
Rules for classification: 1) Points; 2) Goal difference; 3) Number of goals scored;
4 December 2017
16:00

Uganda	0–0	Burundi
	Report

Bukhungu Stadium, Kakamega
Referee: Peter Waweru (Kenya)
5 December 2017
14:00

South Sudan	0–3	Ethiopia
	Report	Yalew 24', 50'; Sanni 57'

Bukhungu Stadium, Kakamega
Referee: Sassy Elly Ally (Tanzania)

7 December 2017
14:00

Burundi	4–1	Ethiopia
Kwizera 30'; Urasenga 55'; Mavugo 69'; Nahimana 79'	Report	Hotessa 45+2'

Bukhungu Stadium, Kakamega
Referee: Antony Ogwayo (Kenya)
8 December 2017
14:00

Uganda	5–1	South Sudan
Karisa 8'; Kaweesa 11'; Nsibambi 31', 58'; Wadada 86'	Report	Atak Lual 27'

Bukhungu Stadium, Kakamega
Referee: Mfaume Ali Nassoro (Zanzibar)

10 December 2017
16:00

Ethiopia	1–1	Uganda
Sanni 23'	Report	Nsibambi 87'

Bukhungu Stadium, Kakamega
Referee: Peter Waweru (Kenya)
11 December 2017
14:00

South Sudan	0–0	Burundi
	Report

Bukhungu Stadium, Kakamega
Referee: Mfaume Ali Nassoro (Zanzibar)

== Knockout stage ==
=== Bracket ===
Semi-finals
14 December
Kenya (a.e.t.)	1
Burundi	0
15 December
Uganda	1
Zanzibar	2

Final
17 December
Kenya (pen.)	2 (3)
Zanzibar	2 (2)
Third place match
17 December
Burundi	1
Uganda	2

=== Semi-finals ===
14 December 2017
15:00

Kenya	1–0 (a.e.t.)	Burundi
Isuza 97'	Report

Moi Stadium, Kisumu
Referee: Malong Ring Akech (South Sudan)

15 December 2017
15:00

Uganda	1–2	Zanzibar
Nsibambi 29'	Report	Makame 23'; Issa 58' (pen.)

Moi Stadium, Kisumu
Referee: Twagirumukiza Abdoul Karim (Rwanda)

=== Third place match ===
17 December 2017
13:30

Burundi	1–2	Uganda
Kwizera 24'	Report	Juma 49', 76'

Kenyatta Stadium, Machakos
Referee: Peter Waweru (Kenya)

=== Final ===
17 December 2017
15:00

Kenya	2–2 (a.e.t.)	Zanzibar
Ochieng 6'; Juma 97'	Report	Makame 89', 100'
Penalties
Atudo (penalty scored); Otieno (penalty missed); Onguso (penalty scored); Onyango (penalty scored)	3–2	(penalty missed) Saleh; (penalty missed) Haidar; (penalty scored) Salum; (penalty scored) Yahya

Kenyatta Stadium, Machakos
Referee: Twagirumukiza Abdoul Karim (Rwanda)

== Goalscorers ==
4 goals

- (Uganda) Derrick Nsibambi

3 goals

- (Zanzibar) Khamis Musa Makame

2 goals

- (Burundi) Pierre Kwizera
- (Ethiopia) Abubakher Sanni
- (Ethiopia) Abel Yalew
- (Kenya) Masoud Juma
- (Uganda) Ibrahim Juma
- (Zanzibar) Mohamed Issa
- (Zanzibar) Kassim Suleiman

1 goal

- (Burundi) Laudit Mavugo
- (Burundi) Shassiri Nahimana
- (Burundi) Cedric Dani Urasenga
- (Ethiopia) Dawa Hotessa
- (Kenya) Whyvonne Isuza
- (Kenya) Ovella Ochieng
- (Kenya) Vincent Oburu
- (Kenya) Duncan Otieno
- (Libya) Zakaria Al Harish
- (Rwanda) Muhadjiri Hakizimana
- (South Sudan) Atak Lual
- (Tanzania) Himid Mao Mkami
- (Uganda) Milton Karisa
- (Uganda) Hood Kaweesa
- (Uganda) Nicholas Wadada
- (Zanzibar) Ibrahim Ahmada
- (Zanzibar) Mudathir Yahya
