= Arakaza MacArthur =

Burundian footballer (born 1995)

Personal information
- Date of birth: 29 July 1995 (age 31)
- Place of birth: Makamba
- Height: 1.80 m (5 ft 11 in)
- Position: Goalkeeper

Team information
- Current team: Etincelles

Senior career*
Years	Team	Apps	(Gls)
2012	LLB Académic		
2014	Flambeau de l’Est		
2015	Vital'O	88	(0)
2016	FC Dikhil		
2017	SC Villa	55	(0)
2018	Kakamega Homeboyz	39	(0)
2020-2022	Lusaka Dynamos	20	(0)
2022-2023	Geita Gold		
2023	Etincelles		

International career
2012–	Burundi	28	(0)
- * Club domestic league appearances and goals

Arakaza MacArthur (born 29 July 1995) is a Burundian professional footballer, who plays as a goalkeeper for Lusaka Dynamos F.C. in the Zambia Super League. Lusaka Dynamos Football Club is a Zambian football club based in Lusaka. The club's nickname is "The Elite" and it lives up to its billing by way of the profile it commands in the media and general public. Lusaka Dynamos plays in the top division of the Football Association of Zambia league, called the Zambia Super League. Mac Arthur Popularly dubbed lion ("Saint lion") for his ability to produce spectacular saves, Arthur is widely regarded to be one of the greatest goalkeepers of all time in the East African region.

== Background ==
Born in the south of the country in Makamba, MacArthur comes from a modest family, passionate about football. Very young, he discovers that his father is a big lover of the round ball who has his own football club made up of very young boys. McArthur realizes he was made to be in the woods, the proof is that he still does quite well. The fans like him despite his boyish size. Deep down, young MAC Arthur tells himself that you can't let go.

In 2007, he was selected by the Aigle noir team. He is a guardian and does wonders. Football lovers said to themselves "this child is terrible. His talent will take him far ". At the time, his club were playing the B League from within. Mac Arthur has often been called upon by the national coach to join the cadet squad.

In 2009, when his club Aigle Noir suffered a fall to return to the 2nd division, Arthur like most of his former teammates was recruited by the club Vital'O. To meet his desire to always improve, he moved to South Africa, to a goalkeeper academy "FAGA" (Farouk Abrahams Goalkeeper AcademY). Farouk Abrahams is a former South African national team goalkeeper, and he was the one who spotted him.

He helped his club Flambeau de l’Est to win the national championship for the 2013 season.

In July 2017, Mac Arthur joined Uganda side SC Villa after concluding a transfer from his home team Vital'O where he helped the club maintain a good position in the Uganda Super league.

In October 2018, Mac Arthur joined Kenya premier league side Kakamega Homeboyz, before joining Lusaka Dynamos late that year

== Haipotei Foundation ==
Launched in May, the Haipotei Foundation, works to provide sustenance for children who need it.

"We had a chance to make a national and international career, our dream has always been to share the little we have with others. Today, on this great day of the launch of this foundation, I am delighted with this step We are more committed to helping vulnerable children and I think we will do our best to achieve our goal" Arakaza said. Arakaza Mac Arthur donated to and supported more than 500 vulnerable children of Jabe center housing orphans. Among the items donated included food stuffs and school materials to help these young children to be able to study and have a brilliant future.

== International career ==
He was invited by Lofty Naseem, the national team coach, to represent Burundi in the 2014 African Nations Championship held in South Africa.
