= Ochan =

Ochan is a surname. Notable people with the surname include:

- Benjamin Ochan, Ugandan footballer
- Betty Aol Ochan, Ugandan teacher
- Patrick Ochan (cricketer) (born 1988), Ugandan footballer
- Patrick Ochan (footballer) (born 1990), Ugandan footballer
- Patricia Ochan Okiria, Ugandan lawyer
