= Maniema FC =

- Full name: Maniema Fantastique
- Ground: Prince Louis Rwagasore Stadium; Bujumbura, Burundi
- Capacity: 22,000
- League: Burundi Premier League

Maniema Fantastique or simply Maniema FC is a football (soccer) club from Burundi based in Bujumbura. Their home venue is 22,000 capacity Prince Louis Rwagasore Stadium.

The team currently plays in the Burundi Premier League the top level of Burundian football.

== Honours ==
- Burundi Premier League (7): 1965, 1966, 1967, 1968, 1982, 1995, 1997
