= Opolot =

Opolot is a surname. Notable people with the surname include:

- Daniel Isiagi Opolot (born 1995), Ugandan footballer
- Shaban Opolot (1924–2005), Ugandan military officer
