= Le Messager Ngozi FC =

Burundi professional association football club

Le Messager
- Full name: Le Messager Football Club
- Founded: 2005; 21 years ago
- Ground: Stade Urukundo; Ngozi, Burundi
- Capacity: 5,000
- Chairman: Athanase Hatungimana
- Manager: Jimmy Ndayizeye
- League: Ligue A
- 2025–26: Ligue A, 11th of 16
Home colours	Away colours

Le Messager Football Club, commonly referred to as Le Messager FC is a Burundian professional football club based in Ngozi, Ngozi Province of Burundi, that plays in Ligue A, the top division of Burundi football.

Founded in 2005, Le Messager have won three league titles and one Burundian Cup. The club plays its home matches at 5,000 capacity Stade Urukundo.

== History ==
The club was founded in 2005, when the late president Pierre Nkurunziza decided to set up “Le Messager” football academies. Le Messager Ngozi had won promotion from the second division at the end of the 2011–12 season finished their first season in the top-flight of Burundi football, 2012–13, on the 5th place.

In the 2013–14 season, Le Messager finished 4th in the league and reached the final of the Coupe du Président de la République losing 1–1 (3–4 on penalty shootout) to LLB Académic, qualifying for CAF Confederation Cup

The following season saw again a fourth-place finish, as well as reaching the quarter-finals of the Coupe du Président de la République, losing 0–3 in front of Athlético Olympique. Le Messager made their continental debut against Benfica de Luanda in the preliminary round of the 2015 CAF Confederation Cup, losing 0–3 on aggregate.

In 2016, the club won its first trophy, the Coupe du Président de la République, beating Vital'O 1–1 (4–3 on penalty shootout) in the final and, also came out as runners-up in the 2015–16 Ligue A season.

In the following season, Le Messager finished sixth in Ligue A and returned to the Coupe du Président de la République final where they were defeated 1–2 by Olympic Star de Muyinga. In 2017 CAF Confederation Cup preliminary round, beat the Zanzibarian club KVZ 4–2 on aggregate, advancing to the first round where they were eliminated by Zesco United (0–2 away and 2–2 home).

== Honours ==
- Burundi Ligue A
  - Winners (3): 2017–18, 2019–20, 2020–21
  - Runners-up (1): 2015–16
- Burundi Ligue B
  - Winners (1): 2011–12
- Burundian Cup
  - Winners (1): 2016
  - Runners-up (2): 2014, 2017

== Performance in CAF competitions ==
Season	Competition	Round	Club	Home	Away	Aggregate
2015	CAF Confederation Cup	Preliminary round	(Angola) Benfica de Luanda	0–1	0–2	0–3
2017	CAF Confederation Cup	Preliminary round	(Zanzibar) KVZ	3–0	1–2	4–2
2017	CAF Confederation Cup	First round	(Zambia) ZESCO United	2–2	0–2	2–4
2018–19	CAF Champions League	Preliminary round	(Egypt) Ismaily	0–1	1–2	1–3
2020–21	CAF Champions League	Preliminary round	(Egypt) Young Buffaloes	1–1	0–0	1–1 (a)

== League history ==
- Burundi Ligue A: 2012–now
- Burundi Ligue B: 2005–2012

== Squad ==
As of 29 October 2022

Note: Flags indicate national team as defined under FIFA eligibility rules; some limited exceptions apply. Players may hold more than one non-FIFA nationality.

No.	Pos.	Nation	Player
22	GK	BDI	Onesime Rukundo
17	DF	BDI	Cedric Danny Urasenga
3	DF	BDI	Radjabu Mvuyekure
5	DF	BDI	Adolphe Hakizimana
8	DF	BDI	Ibrahim Karikera
10	DF	BDI	Ismail Nzigiyimana
11	MF	BDI	Ali Intelligent Fataki
13	MF	BDI	Raoul Vyamungu
20	FW	BDI	Joseph Kashindi
25	MF	BDI	Vincent Barungitse

No.	Pos.	Nation	Player
1	FW	BDI	Ally Iradukunda
2	GK	BDI	Landry Iradukunda
6	FW	BDI	Karim Bizoza
9	MF	BDI	Arthur Nibikora
14	MF	BDI	Ladislas Mpisemwoneza
16	MF	BDI	Djuma Ndikumana
18	FW	BDI	Alexis Hakizimana
27	FW	BDI	Yassin Dushime
24	DF	BDI	Akbar Muderi
21	DF	BDI	Hamza Nyanzira
