= Hood Kaweesa =

Ugandan footballer (born 1982)

Personal information
- Full name: Kiseny Huudu Kaweesa
- Date of birth: 22 July 1982 (age 44)
- Place of birth: Kampala, Uganda
- Position: Defender

Team information
- Current team: Police FC

Senior career*
Years	Team	Apps	(Gls)
2001	SC Villa		
2002–2010	URA SC		
2010–2012	Victors FC		
2012–2013	SC Villa		
2014–2015	Lweza FC		
2015–2018	Police FC		
2018	Buildcon		
2019–	Police FC		

International career
2002–2017	Uganda	18	(2)
- * Club domestic league appearances and goals as of 13 June 2021

Hood Kaweesa (born 22 July 1982) is a Ugandan football defender who plays for Police FC. He was a squad member for the 2002 CECAFA Cup.

== Career statistics ==
=== International ===
Appearances and goals by national team and year
National team	Year	Apps	Goals
Uganda	2002	6	1
Uganda	2003	5	0
Uganda	2004	2	0
Uganda	2005	–	
Uganda	2006	–	
Uganda	2007	–	
Uganda	2008	–	
Uganda	2009	–	
Uganda	2010	–	
Uganda	2011	–	
Uganda	2012	–	
Uganda	2013	–	
Uganda	2014	–	
Uganda	2015	–	
Uganda	2016	–	
Uganda	2017	5	1
Total		18	2

Scores and results list Uganda's goal tally first, score column indicates score after each Kaweesa goal.

List of international goals scored by Hood Kaweesa
No.	Date	Venue	Opponent	Score	Result	Competition
1	4 December 2002	Sheikh Amri Abeid Memorial Stadium, Arusha, Tanzania	Ethiopia	2–0	3–0	2002 CECAFA Cup
2	7 December 2017	Bukhungu Stadium, Kakamega, Kenya	South Sudan	2–0	5–1	2017 CECAFA Cup
