= Nicholas Wadada =

Ugandan footballer (born 1994)

Personal information
- Full name: Nicholas Wadada Wakiro
- Date of birth: 27 July 1994 (age 32)
- Place of birth: Lugazi, Uganda
- Height: 1.64 m (5 ft 5 in)
- Position: Right-back

Team information
- Current team: Azam
- Number: 14

Senior career*
Years	Team	Apps	(Gls)
2010–2013	Bunamwaya FC		
2013–2018	Vipers SC		
2018–	Azam		

International career^{‡}
2013–	Uganda	36	(4)
2013	Uganda U23	2	(0)
2012	Uganda U20	6	(0)
2012–	Uganda	57	(1)
- * Club domestic league appearances and goals ‡ National team caps and goals as of 29 March 2021

Nicholas Wadada Wakiro (born 27 July 1994) is a Ugandan professional footballer who plays as a right-back for Azam F.C. of Tanzania and the Uganda national team.

== Club career ==
=== Early career ===
Wadada began playing youth football at the age of 13 with Lukuli United in 2007. He later joined St. Mary's Kitende in 2010 and in the same year he joined Uganda Super League club Bunamwaya FC (now Vipers SC).

=== Bunamwaya FC ===
Wadada joined Bunamwaya FC in 2010 at 16 years he was a backup player in the right-back position in few games that season.

In the 2011–12 season Wadada became a regular player and was part of the team that finished runners-up in the 2011–12 Uganda Super League.

In 2012–13 Wadada played 20 league games while Bunamwaya finished third in the Uganda Premier League.

=== Vipers SC ===
In 2013–14 season his Club Bunamwaya FC changed its name to Vipers SC. Wadada maintained his first place in the team despite Vipers SC finishing in fourth position that season. He started in 32 games and scored 3 goals.

In 2014–15 Wadada at only 20 years he became a key player and played a very big role in winning the Uganda Premier League. He played 30 games and scored 4 goals.

In 2015–16 Wadada became captain of Vipers SC. He won the Uganda Cup that season after defeating Onduparaka FC in the final. He played 34 games and scored 2 goals.

In 2016–17, Wadada captained Vipers SC team that played in the CAF Confederation Cup against Platinum Stars of South Africa. His club finished third in the Premier League. He played 35 games and netted 2 goals.

2017–18, Wadada lifted the Premier league title with Vipers SC, his second trophy as captain. he played 36 games and finished runners-up in the Uganda Cup.

=== Azam ===
In June 2018 Wadada signed a contract with Tanzanian club Azam F.C.

== International career ==
=== Youth ===
Nicolas Wadada received his first call-up to the Uganda U20 team (The Hippos) in 2012 during the African U20 qualifiers. He played two games against Mozambique. In the same tournament he also played in the 3–1 win against Ghana in Kampala in the first leg. He also started in the return leg in Ghana.

In 2013, he played two games for the Uganda U23 team.

=== Senior ===
Wadada received his first call on the Senior team from the Bobby Williamson the Cranes coach in 2013. He was part of the Cranes team that won the 2013 CECAFA Championship.

Wadada was among the 23 players that made it to the AFCON 2017 in Gabon. He started one game and came as a substitute in the match against Egypt.

He played all the six games in the 2018 World Cup qualifiers against Egypt, Ghana and Republic of the Congo.

Wadada scored in a match against Niger on 2 June 2018 during the Three Nation Tournament in Niamey.

== Career statistics ==
As of matches played on 29 March 2021

Appearances and goals by national team and year
National team	Year	Apps	Goals
Uganda	2012	3	0
Uganda	2013	9	0
Uganda	2014	4	0
Uganda	2015	0	0
Uganda	2016	6	0
Uganda	2017	15	1
Uganda	2018	11	0
Uganda	2019	6	0
Uganda	2020	1	0
Uganda	2021	2	0
Total		57	1

Scores and results list Uganda's goal tally first, score column indicates score after each Wadada goal.

List of international goals scored by Nicholas Wadada
No.	Date	Venue	Opponent	Score	Result	Competition
1	8 December 2017	Bukhungu Stadium, Kakamega, Kenya	South Sudan	5–1	5–1	2017 CECAFA Cup

== Honours ==
Vipers SC

- Uganda Premier League: 2014–15, 2017–18
- Uganda Cup: 2015; runners-up 2013, 2018
- Super Cup: 2016

Uganda

- CECAFA: 2013, 2016
