= Jeff Nzokira =

Burundian footballer

Personal information
- Date of birth: 24 October 1987 (age 39)
- Place of birth: Bujumbura, Burundi
- Height: 1.80 m (5 ft 11 in)
- Position: Goalkeeper

Team information
- Current team: FC Dikhil

Senior career*
Years	Team	Apps	(Gls)
2009–2012	Vital'O FC		
2012–2020	Djibouti Télécom		
2020–	FC Dikhil		

International career
2011–2016	Burundi	5	(0)
- * Club domestic league appearances and goals

Jeff Nzokira (born 24 October 1987) is a Burundian footballer who currently plays for FC Dikhil as a goalkeeper.

== Career ==
He played for the Vital'O FC and Djibouti Télécom. He made his international debut for Burundi in 2011.
