= Nsibambi =

Nsibambi is a surname. Notable people with the surname include:

- Apolo Nsibambi (1940–2019), Ugandan academic
- Derrick Nsibambi (born 1994), Ugandan footballer
