= Duncan Otieno =

Kenyan footballer (born 1994)

Personal information
- Full name: Duncan Martin Otieno
- Date of birth: 26 May 1994 (age 32)
- Place of birth: Nairobi, Kenya
- Height: 1.75 m (5 ft 9 in)
- Position: Midfielder

Team information
- Current team: Lusaka Dynamos

Senior career*
Years	Team	Apps	(Gls)
2014–2015	A.F.C. Leopards	20	(1)
2016	Posta Rangers	24	(0)
2017–2018	A.F.C. Leopards	59	(1)
2019–2020	Nkana		
2020–	Lusaka Dynamos		

International career^{‡}
2017–	Kenya	10	(1)
- * Club domestic league appearances and goals as of 14:31, 16 June 2021 (UTC) ‡ National team caps and goals as of 14:31, 16 June 2021 (UTC)

Duncan Otieno (born 26 May 1994) is a Kenyan international footballer who plays for Zambian club Lusaka Dynamos, as a midfielder.

== Career ==
Born in Nairobi, he has played club football for A.F.C. Leopards, Posta Rangers, Nkana and Lusaka Dynamos.

He made his international debut for Kenya in 2017.

=== International goals ===
Scores and results list Kenya's goal tally first.

No.	Date	Venue	Opponent	Score	Result	Competition
1.	13 December 2017	Bukhungu Stadium, Kakamega, Kenya	Rwanda	2–0	2–0	2017 CECAFA Cup
