= Bigirimana =

Bigirimana is a Burundian surname. Notable people with the surname include:

- Balthazar Bigirimana (1957–2012), Burundian politician and diplomat
- Blaise Bigirimana (born 1998), Burundian footballer
- Eraste Bigirimana (born 1964), Burundian Anglican bishop
- Gaël Bigirimana (born 1993), Burundian footballer
- Pius Bigirimana (born 1958) Ugandan civil servant
