= Masoud Juma =

Kenyan footballer (born 1996)

Personal information
- Full name: Masoud Juma Choka
- Date of birth: 3 February 1996 (age 30)
- Place of birth: Isiolo, Kenya
- Height: 1.87 m (6 ft 2 in)
- Position: Forward

Youth career
- Isiolo Barracks Secondary
- Isiolo Youth FC
- Kambakia Christian Centre

Senior career*
Years	Team	Apps	(Gls)
2014	Shabana	5	(5)
2014–2016	Bandari	10	(8)
2016–2017	SoNy Sugar	28	(15)
2017–2018	Kariobangi Sharks	31	(24)
2018	Cape Town City	4	(1)
2018	Dibba Al-Fujairah	10	(4)
2019	Al-Nasr Benghazi	0	(0)
2019–2020	JS Kabylie	10	(0)
2020–2023	Difaâ Hassani El Jadidi	56	(16)
2023	→ Al-Faisaly (loan)	13	(8)
2023–2024	Al-Jabalain	10	(1)
2024–2025	Esteghlal	11	(3)
2025-2026	Nejmeh SC	21	(9)

International career^{‡}
2015	Kenya U23		
2017–	Kenya	27	(8)
- * Club domestic league appearances and goals as of 1st August 2026 ‡ National team caps and goals as of 22 August 2025

Masoud Juma Choka (born 3 February 1996) is a Kenyan footballer who last played as a forward for the Kenya national team.

== Club career ==
=== Early years ===
Born and raised in Isiolo, Juma began playing football at Tumaini Primary School. He then led his Isiolo Barracks Secondary School team to the Coca-Cola/AFCO Inter-military Schools Championship, where he was named tournament MVP with five goals. During this time, he also featured for Isiolo Youth FC, in the fifth-tier Kenyan County Champions League. He then joined FKF Division One club Kambakia Christian Centre FC for a short while before rejoining Isiolo Youth FC in February 2014.

=== Professional career ===
He was soon discovered by Kenyan National Super League team Shabana during a national talent search held in Kasarani. During the 2014 season, Juma scored five goals in three months, drawing comparisons to legendary Kenyan striker Dennis Oliech. That summer, after being linked with several top clubs, Juma signed a two-year deal with Kenyan Premier League side Bandari. After struggling in the second half of the year, Juma started the 2015 season with promise. However, in a fixture against SoNy Sugar in April, he suffered an ankle injury which kept him out for five months. Coincidentally, this happened right after earning a call-up to the Kenya U23 squad. He was back in action by September, and helped Bandari close out the season to finish in fourth place. During the 2015 FKF President's Cup final in December, Juma scored eight minutes after replacing Farid Mohammed to seal Bandari's 4–2 win over Nakumatt.

Despite his strong showing after returning from injury, Juma did not receive much playing time during the first half of the 2016 season, mainly due to the acquisitions of Dan Sserunkuma, Edwin Lavatsa and Meshack Karani in January. He made it known through social media that he planned on finding another team during the nearing midseason transfer window. Although technical director Edward Oduor tried denying the reports, Juma was soon linked to SoNy Sugar, and eventually signed with them in June. He scored his maiden goal with his new club in his sixth match of the season, against Western Stima. His stay at SoNy Sugar was highlighted by his "penchant for spectacular strikes," which helped him improve his stock in the eyes of many teams around the league. He also attracted the attention of Kenyan national team head coach Stanley Okumbi, who called him up to the squad in June.

He was picked up by newly promoted Premier League side Kariobangi Sharks in January 2017. He scored five goals in the 2017 President's Cup campaign, including two in the semi-finals against SoNy Sugar to secure the Sharks their first-ever appearance in the finals, where they eventually lost to A.F.C. Leopards. He also earned the Premier League Golden Boot by netting a league-best 18 goals that season. Sharks finished in third place.

In June 2017, Juma trained with Swedish clubs AIK and Jönköpings Södra, followed by South African side Bidvest Wits in July, but he was signed by Cape Town City on 2 January 2018.

On 22 September, Juma signed for Dibba Club in UAE.

On 26 February 2019, Juma joined Libyan champions Al-Nasr Benghazi.

On 29 January 2023, Juma joined Saudi Arabian club Al-Faisaly on loan from Difaâ Hassani El Jadidi.

On 8 July 2023, Juma joined Saudi Arabian club Al-Jabalain.

In December 2024, He joined Esteghlal FC in Persian gulf pro league and he left the club at the end of season.

In September 2025, He joined Nejmeh SC in the Lebanese Premier League for the 2025–26 Lebanese Premier League season.

== International career ==
While at Bandari, Juma earned a call-up to the Kenya national under-23 team, in preparation for the upcoming 2015 African Games qualifying campaign. However, an injury sustained during a Premier League fixture prevented him from joining the national team.

Juma made his senior international debut for Kenya in June 2017, when he was named to the starting XI of a 2019 Africa Cup of Nations qualifying match against Sierra Leone. He was the subject of severe criticism from the Kenyan fans following his performance, mainly stemming from a missed shot in the early minutes of what eventually ended as a 2–1 loss. Critics felt that the starting role should have been given to a more established striker, namely Stephen Waruru (the Premier League's top scorer at the time).

He earned his second cap during a friendly against Mauritania two months later, where he scored with a 58th-minute header. This match, however, was not considered a full international match, since Kenya fielded a 'B' team composed only of locally based players.

== Career statistics ==
=== International ===
As of 22 August 2025

Kenya
Year	Apps	Goals
2017	7	3
2019	2	0
2020	3	1
2021	4	1
2023	6	3
2025	5	0
Total	27	8

=== International goals ===
As of 20 November 2023 (scores and results list Kenya's goal tally first)

Goal	Date	Venue	Opponent	Score	Result	Competition
1.	31 August 2017	Adrar Stadium, Agadir, Morocco	Mauritania	1–0	1–1	Friendly
2.	3 December 2017	Bukhungu Stadium, Kakamega, Kenya	Rwanda	1–0	2–0	2017 CECAFA Cup
3.	17 December 2017	Kenyatta Stadium, Machakos, Kenya	Zanzibar	2–1	2–2 (3–2 p)	2017 CECAFA Cup
4.	11 November 2020	Moi International Sports Centre, Nairobi, Kenya	Comoros	1–1	1–1	2021 Africa Cup of Nations qualification
5.	29 March 2021	Stade de Kégué, Lomé, Togo	Togo	2–0	2–1	2021 Africa Cup of Nations qualification
6.	16 October 2023	Mardan Sports Complex, Aksu, Turkey	Russia	2–1	2–2	Friendly
7.	16 November 2023	Stade de Franceville, Franceville, Gabon	Gabon	1–0	1–2	2026 FIFA World Cup qualification
8.	20 November 2023	Felix Houphouet Boigny Stadium, Abidjan, Ivory Coast	Seychelles	3–0	5–0	2026 FIFA World Cup qualification

== Honours ==
Bandari

- FKF President's Cup: 2015
- Kenyan Super Cup: 2016

Esteghlal

- Iranian Hazfi Cup: 2024–25

Nejmeh

- Lebanese FA Cup: 2025–26

Kenya

- CECAFA Cup: 2017

Individual

- Kenyan Premier League top scorer: 2017

== Personal life ==
Juma is a supporter of Arsenal.
