= Académie Tchité FC =

Académie Tchité
- Full name: Académie Tchité Football Club
- Nicknames: Bleu et Blanc (Blue and white)
- Ground: Stade Intwari; Bujumbura, Burundi
- Capacity: 10,000

Académie Tchité Football Club or simply Académie Tchité was a football (soccer) club from Burundi based in Bujumbura. The club played seven seasons in Ligue A, the first level of Burundian football. Their home venue was 10,000 capacity Stade Prince Louis Rwagasore.

== History ==
The club was founded in the capital Bujumbura by Mohammed Tchité and played in the First Division of Burundi starting with the 2009 season when they finished in fourth place.

Followed four seasons in which the white-blues was ranked as follows: 5th (2010), 7th (2010–11), 8th (2011–12) and 9th (2012–13).

Their biggest achievement during this period was winning the cup title at the end of the 2012–13 season. Led by Jimmy Ndayizeye, the white and blues defeated LLB Académic in the final, 1–0 after extra time, qualifying for the CAF Confederation Cup.

In the 2014 CAF Confederation Cup, was eliminated in the preliminary round by AS Kigali from Rwanda (0–1 away and 1–1 home). In the championship finished on 9th place the 2013–14 season and reached the quarter-finals of the Coupe du President de la Republique.

Académie Tchité relegated at the end of the 2014–15 season finishing last on the league table.

== Honours ==
Coupe de la Confédération

- Winners (1): 2013
