= Fabien Mutombora =

Burundian footballer

Personal information
- Date of birth: 7 April 1997 (age 29)
- Place of birth: Rohero, Bujumbura, Burundi
- Height: 1.83 m (6 ft 0 in)
- Position: Goalkeeper

Team information
- Current team: Vipers SC
- Number: 1

Senior career*
Years	Team	Apps	(Gls)
2016–2018	LLB Académic		
2018–	Vipers SC	56	(0)

International career^{‡}
2017–	Burundi	4	(0)
- * Club domestic league appearances and goals as of end of 2019–20 season ‡ National team caps and goals as of 17:03, 15 February 2021 (UTC)

Fabien Mutombora (born 7 April 1997) is a Burundian professional footballer who plays as a goalkeeper for Uganda Premier League club Vipers SC and the Burundi national football team.

== Early life ==
Mutombora was born in Rohero, Bujumbura, Burundi.

== Club career ==
After playing for LLB Académic in Burundi, Mutombora signed for Vipers SC of the Uganda Premier League in August 2018 on a three-year deal. He signed a three-year contract extension with the club in October 2020.

== International career ==
Mutombora made his international debut in a friendly against Djibouti on 13 March 2017.
