= 2014 CECAFA Nile Basin Cup =

Tournament details
- Host country: Sudan
- Dates: 23 May–4 June
- Teams: 12 (from 10 associations)
- Venues: 3 (in 3 host cities)

Final positions
- Champions: (Uganda) Victoria University (1st title)
- Runners-up: (Kenya) A.F.C. Leopards
- Third place: (Sudan) Al-Ahly Shendi
- Fourth place: (Burundi) Académie Tchité

The 2014 CECAFA Nile Basin Cup was the inaugural edition of the CECAFA Nile Basin Cup, which is organised by CECAFA. It began on 23 May and concluded on 4 June, with Sudan as the first hosts of the tournament.

Ugandan Super League club Victoria University beat A.F.C. Leopards in the final to clinch their first title and US$ 30,000 in prize money. A.F.C. Leopards took home US$20,000 for finishing second, while Sudanese side Al-Ahly Shendi beat Académie Tchité of Burundi in the third place play-off to take home US$10,000.

== Participants ==
On 12 May 2014, the draw for clubs to participate in the tournament was released. The tournament was originally due to kick off on 22 May, but was pushed back a day.

Group A

- (Sudan) Al-Merrikh
- (Uganda) Victoria University
- (South Sudan) Al-Malakia
- (Zanzibar) Polisi

Group B

- (Kenya) A.F.C. Leopards
- (Tanzania) Mbeya City
- (Burundi) Académie Tchité
- (Rwanda) Etincelles

Group C

- (Sudan) Al-Ahly Shendi
- (Ethiopia) Defence
- (Djibouti) Dikhil

== Group stage ==
The group stage featured eleven teams, with 4 teams in Group A and B and only three in Group C. Three teams advanced from Group A and B and two from Group C.

If two or more teams are equal on points on completion of the group matches, the following criteria are applied to determine the rankings (in descending order):

1. Number of points obtained in games between the teams involved;
2. Goal difference in games between the teams involved;
3. Goals scored in games between the teams involved;
4. Away goals scored in games between the teams involved;
5. Goal difference in all games;
6. Goals scored in all games;
7. Drawing of lots.

=== Group A ===
Team	Pld	W	D	L	GF	GA	GD	Pts
(Sudan) Al-Merrikh	3	2	1	0	7	2	+5	7
(Uganda) Victoria University	3	2	1	0	4	0	+4	7
(South Sudan) Al-Malakia	3	1	0	2	5	5	0	3
(Zanzibar) Polisi	3	0	0	3	0	9	−9	0

23 May 2014
Victoria University (Uganda)	1–0	(South Sudan) Al-Malakia
Al-Merrikh (Sudan)	3–0	(Zanzibar) Polisi
25 May 2014
Polisi (Zanzibar)	0–3	(South Sudan) Al-Malakia
Al-Merrikh (Sudan)	0–0	(Uganda) Victoria University
28 May 2014
Polisi (Zanzibar)	0–3	(Uganda) Victoria University
Al-Malakia (South Sudan)	2–4	(Sudan) Al-Merrikh

=== Group B ===
Team	Pld	W	D	L	GF	GA	GD	Pts
(Kenya) A.F.C. Leopards	3	3	0	0	5	1	+4	9
(Tanzania) Mbeya City	3	1	1	1	4	4	0	4
(Burundi) Académie Tchité	3	1	0	2	3	4	−1	3
(Rwanda) Etincelles	3	0	1	2	0	3	−3	1

24 May 2014
Mbeya City (Tanzania)	3–2	(Burundi) Académie Tchité
A.F.C. Leopards (Kenya)	2–0	(Rwanda) Etincelles
26 May 2014
Mbeya City (Tanzania)	1–2	(Kenya) A.F.C. Leopards
Académie Tchité (Burundi)	1–0	(Rwanda) Etincelles
28 May 2014
Etincelles (Rwanda)	0–0	(Tanzania) Mbeya City
A.F.C. Leopards (Kenya)	1–0	(Burundi) Académie Tchité

=== Group C ===
Team	Pld	W	D	L	GF	GA	GD	Pts
(Sudan) Al-Ahly Shendi	2	2	0	0	4	1	+3	6
(Ethiopia) Defence	2	1	0	1	2	3	−1	3
(Djibouti) Dikhil	2	0	0	2	2	4	−2	0

24 May 2014
Al-Ahly Shendi (Sudan)	2–1	(Djibouti) Dikhil
25 May 2014
Dikhil (Djibouti)	1–2	(Ethiopia) Defence
28 May 2014
Defence (Ethiopia)	0–2	(Sudan) Al-Ahly Shendi

== Knockout stage ==
In the knockout stage, teams play against each other once. The losers of the semi-finals faced each other in a third place playoff, where the winner was placed third overall in the entire competition.

Quarter-finals
30 May
(Kenya) A.F.C. Leopards	3
(Ethiopia) Defence	2
30 May
(Sudan) Al-Merrikh	1 (2)
(Burundi) Académie Tchité	1 (3)
31 May
(Uganda) Victoria University	1
(Tanzania) Mbeya City	0
31 May
(Sudan) Al-Ahly Shendi	3
(South Sudan) Al-Malakia	0

Semi-finals
2 June
(Kenya) A.F.C. Leopards	2
(Burundi) Académie Tchité	0
2 June
(Uganda) Victoria University	1
(Sudan) Al-Ahly Shendi	0

Final
4 June
(Kenya) A.F.C. Leopards	1
(Uganda) Victoria University	2
Third place
4 June
(Burundi) Académie Tchité	1
(Sudan) Al-Ahly Shendi	4
