= Benjamin Ochan =

Ugandan footballer (born 1989)

Personal information
- Full name: Benjamin Ochan
- Date of birth: 18 September 1989 (age 37)
- Height: 1.85 m (6 ft 1 in)
- Position: Goalkeeper

Team information
- Current team: KCCA FC
- Number: 99

Youth career
- 2007: AGF Aarhus

Senior career*
Years	Team	Apps	(Gls)
2008–2009	KCCA FC		
2010	Bloemfontein Celtic		
2011–2012	Villa SC		
2013–2014	Victoria University SC		
2015–2018	KCCA FC		
2018–2019	Kabwe Warriors		
2019–2021	A.F.C. Leopards		
2021–	KCCA FC	27	

International career
2013–	Uganda	18	(0)
- * Club domestic league appearances and goals

Benjamin Ochan is a Ugandan professional footballer who plays for KCCA FC in the Uganda Premier League as a goalkeeper. He is also a member of Uganda national football team. Since October 2021, he serves as KCCA FC captain.

== Career ==
Ochan has played for different clubs such as KCCA FC, Bloemfontein Celtic, Villa SC, Victoria University SC, Kabwe Warriors, AFC Leopards and currently in KCCA FC

=== KCCA FC ===
In 2015, he joined KCCA FC from Victoria University SC, and signed a 2-year contract. Made his debut against Uganda Revenue Authority. He is one of the few players in the league who played all the 15 games in the first round of the 2016/17 Uganda Premier League Ochan kept 8 clean sheets with 4 coming in the first round while the other 4 came in the second round. In December 2016, Ochan signed another 1-year contract which kept him at KCCA FC up to January 2018. While at KCCA FC Ochan was the second assistant captain. In His fruitful and best days at Lugogo were when KCCA FC qualified for continental football after edging Egyptian club Al-Masry in penalties through converting the decider in Egypt.,

=== Kabwe Warriors ===
In January 2018, Ochan joined Kabwe Warriors after 2018 African Nations Championship which were held in Morocco and signed a 3years contract. On 14 July 2019 Ochan left Kabwe Warriors F.C. on mutual consent contract.

== A.F.C. Leopards ==
On 16 July 2019 he joined A.F.C. Leopards on a one-year contract.

== KCCA FC ==
Ochan re-joined KCCA FC on a two-year contract on September 13, 2021. He has been the captain of KCCA FC since October 2021.

== International career ==
Ochan made his debut for Uganda national football team on 30 September 2013 against Egypt national football team in a friendly. In January 2014, coach Milutin Sedrojevic, invited him to be included in the Uganda national football team for the 2014 African Nations Championship. The team placed third in the group stage of the competition after beating Burkina Faso, drawing with Zimbabwe and losing to Morocco.

== Honours ==
Victoria University

- CECAFA Nile Basin Cup:1 :2014

Kampala Capital City Authority FC

- Ugandan Super League: 2

2015–16, 2016–17

- Ugandan Cup: 1

2016–17
