= Abel Yalew =

Ethiopian footballer (born 1996)

Personal information
- Full name: Abel Yalew Tilahun
- Date of birth: 23 March 1996 (age 30)
- Place of birth: Addis Ababa, Ethiopia
- Height: 1.76 m (5 ft 9 in)
- Position: Forward

Team information
- Current team: ZED
- Number: 10

Senior career*
Years	Team	Apps	(Gls)
2014–2016	Harar City		
2016–2017	Hawassa City		
2017	Dedebit		
2017–2017	Fasil Kenema		
2018–2024	Saint George	97	(27)
2024–	ZED	9	(0)

International career^{‡}
2017–	Ethiopia	25	(5)
- * Club domestic league appearances and goals as of 21:47, 18 February 2024 (UTC) ‡ National team caps and goals as of 20:00, 27 March 2026 (UTC)

Abel Yalew Tilahun (Amharic: አቤል ያለው; born 23 March 1996) is an Ethiopian professional footballer who plays as a forward for Egyptian Premier League club ZED and the Ethiopia national team.

== International career ==
Yalew made his international debut with the Ethiopia national team in a 3–0 win over South Sudan in the 2017 CECAFA Cup on 5 December 2017.
