= Belyse Ininahazwe =

Burundian football manager

Belyse Ininahazwe is a Burundian football manager and former footballer who last managed AS Inter Star.

== Early life ==
Ininahazwe was born in Burundi. She started playing football in the streets of Bujumbura, Burundi. Her father died when she was three years old. She attended Hope Africa University in Burundi. She studied communications.

== Playing career ==
Ininahazwe operated as a defender. In 2002, she signed for Burundian side La Colombe FC. She helped the club win the league six times. She became their assistant manager in 2016.

== Managerial career ==
In 2017, Ininahazwe was appointed manager of Burundian side La Colombe FC. In 2022, she was appointed manager of Burundian side Academie La Pepiniere. In 2023, she was appointed manager of Burundian side AS Inter Star. She became the first female manager to manage a Burundian men's side.

== Personal life ==
Ininahazwe has regarded Spain international Pep Guardiola as her football idol. She has three brothers. She has a son who was born in 2005. She has obtained the B Coaching License.
