= Daniel Isiagi Opolot =

Ugandan footballer (born 1995)

Personal information
- Full name: Daniel Isiagi Opolot
- Date of birth: 19 December 1995 (age 30)
- Place of birth: Bukedea Bukedea District, Uganda
- Height: 1.90 m (6 ft 3 in)
- Position: Forward

Team information
- Current team: Jomo Cosmos
- Number: 18

Senior career*
Years	Team	Apps	(Gls)
2013–2014	SC Victoria University	21	(5)
2014–2016	Kampala City Council	31	(8)
2016–2018	Proline FC	33	(20)
2018-2019	Al Nasr	15	(5)
2019-2020	U.R.A FC	7	(5)
2020-	Jomo Cosmos FC		

International career^{‡}
2017	Uganda	1	
- * Club domestic league appearances and goals as of 8 January 2020 ‡ National team caps and goals as of 8 January 2020

Daniel Isiagi Opolot (born 19 December 1995) is an Ugandan footballer who plays as a forward the Uganda national team.

== Club career ==
Isiagi has played club football in SC Victoria University, Kampala City Council, Proline FC, Al Nasr and currently in Jomo Cosmos FC in South Africa.

=== Proline FC ===
He joined Proline FC in 2016 from Kampala City Council in the 2017–18 season he scored 10 goals in 17 appearances.

=== Al Nasr ===
In July 2018 Dan joined Al nasr.

== URA FC ==
In September 2019, Daniel joined U.R.A FC.

== National team ==
Isiagi made his Uganda national team debut against South Sudan on 8 December 2017.

== Lifestyle ==
Isiagi is a son to Mr. Isiagi Patrick Opolot and Miss Josephine Deborah Pedune.

== Honors and achievements ==
Victoria University

- CECAFA Nile Basin Cup:1 :2014

Kampala Capital City Authority FC

- Ugandan Super League: 1

2016

=== National team ===
3rd place CECAFA Cup:1 2017
