= Derrick Nsibambi =

Ugandan footballer (born 1994)

Personal information
- Full name: Derrick Paul Nsibambi
- Date of birth: 19 June 1994 (age 32)
- Place of birth: Mulago, Uganda
- Height: 1.74 m (5 ft 9 in)
- Position: Forward

Team information
- Current team: Kampala Capital City Authority

Senior career*
Years	Team	Apps	(Gls)
2014–2018	Kampala Capital City Authority		
2018–2021	Smouha	59	(6)
2021	Sidama Coffee	0	(0)
2021–2022	Sebeta City	14	(2)
2022–2023	Uganda Revenue Authority		
2023	Al-Bashayer		
2023–2024	Bandari		
2024–	Kampala Capital City Authority		

International career^{‡}
2017–	Uganda	23	(6)
- * Club domestic league appearances and goals as of 08:03, 28 June 2025 (UTC) ‡ National team caps and goals as of 08:03, 28 June 2025 (UTC)

Derrick Paul Nsibambi (born 19 June 1994) is a Ugandan professional footballer who plays for Kampala Capital City Authority and the Uganda national team as a forward.

== Club career ==
Born in Mulago, Nsibambi began his career with Kampala Capital City Authority, signing a new contract in July 2017. In January 2018 he said that he would leave the club, before later returning to the club.

In June 2018 he signed for Egyptian club Smouha, initially departing the club before re-joining in January 2020. He suffered from the effects of coronavirus in July and August 2020, but by September 2020 his form with the club was described as "impressive".

After playing in Ethiopia for Sidama Coffee and Sebeta City, he returned to Uganda with Uganda Revenue Authority, before joining Omani club Al-Bashayer in January 2023. In August 2023 he signed for Kenyan club Bandari.

He returned to Kampala Capital City Authority in August 2024.

== International career ==
He made his international debut for Uganda in 2017, playing for them at the 2017 CECAFA Cup. He was also aa squad member at the 2018 African Nations Championship. In November 2018 he had to pull out of the national team as he did not have a passport.

== Career statistics ==
=== International ===
As of matches played on 6 September 2021

Uganda national team
Year	Apps	Goals
2017	13	5
2018	5	1
2019	0	0
2020	2	0
2021	2	0
Total	22	6

=== International goals ===
Scores and results list Uganda's goal tally first.

No.	Date	Venue	Opponent	Score	Result	Competition
1.	22 July 2017	StarTimes Stadium, Kampala, Uganda	South Sudan	1–0	5–1	2018 African Nations Championship qualification
2.	12 August 2017	St. Mary's Stadium-Kitende, Kampala, Uganda	Rwanda	3–0	3–0	2018 African Nations Championship qualification
3.	8 December 2017	Bukhungu Stadium, Kakamega, Kenya	South Sudan	3–1	5–1	2017 CECAFA Cup
4.	8 December 2017	Bukhungu Stadium, Kakamega, Kenya	South Sudan	4–1	5–1	2017 CECAFA Cup
5.	10 December 2017	Bukhungu Stadium, Kakamega, Kenya	Ethiopia	1–1	1–1	2017 CECAFA Cup
6.	15 December 2017	Moi Stadium, Kisumu, Kenya	Zanzibar	1–1	1–2	2017 CECAFA Cup
7.	14 January 2018	Stade de Marrakech, Marrakesh, Morocco	Zambia	1–1	1–3	2018 African Nations Championship
