= Mohammad Issa Nuristani =

Lieutenant General Mohammad Issa Nuristani
- محمد عیسی نورستانی

Commander of the Ministry of Defense Guard
- In office ?–?

Commander of the Harbi Academy
- In office ?–?

Commander of the Royal Palace Guard
- In office ?–?

Commander of Nangarhar Military Forces
- In office ?–?

Commander of the Central Army Corps
- In office 1965–1970

Governor of Paktia
- In office 1970–1973

Personal details
- Born: 1913 Qala-e-Wazir, Chahar Dehi, Kabul, Kingdom of Afghanistan
- Died: 1979 (aged 65–66) Pul-e-Charkhi prison, Kabul, Democratic Republic of Afghanistan
- Education: Habibia High School, Kabul Military Academy
- Awards: Medal of Honour for Faithful Service and Good Conduct; Promotions for battlefield success

Military service
- Allegiance: Kingdom of Afghanistan
- Branch/service: Royal Afghan Guard; Royal Afghan Army; Central Corps
- Years of service: 1936–1973
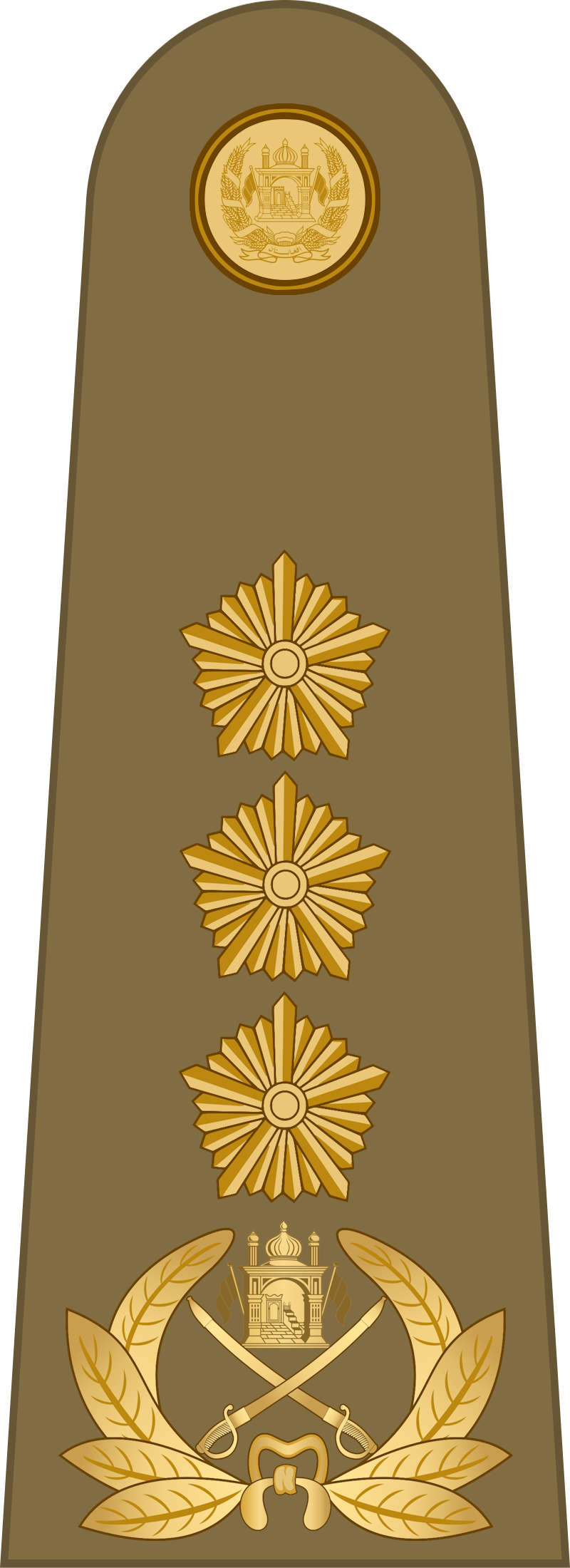
- Rank: Lieutenant General
- Commands: Central Army Corps; Paktia Army Corps; Nangarhar Military Forces
- Battles/wars: Afghan tribal revolts of 1944–1947

Mohammad Isa Nooristani (1913–1979) was a lieutenant general in the Royal Afghan Army. Born in Kabul, he served such as commander of the Central Army Corps and Governor of Paktia. He served in the Royal Afghan Army from 1936 to 1973.

== Early life and education ==
Mohammad Eisa Khan Nuristani, son of Din Mohammad Khan, was born in 1913 in Qala-e-Wazir, Chahar Dehi, Kabul. He attended Habibia High School and later joined the military academy. In 1936, he graduated from the Kabul Military University and joined the Royal Afghan army.

== Career ==
Mohammad Eisa Khan Nuristani had served as commander of the Ministry of Defense’s Guard, the military academy, and the commander of Royal Guard at the Royal Palace. He also worked on Nuristani tribal relations and led sports teams. He earned medals and promotions for his role in the Afghan tribal revolt of 1947. Later, he became commander of Nangarhar’s military and the Central Army Corps. He also served as Governor of Paktia and commander of the Paktia Corps, contributing to the region’s development.

== See also ==
- Afghan Army
