= Patricia Ochan Okiria =

Ugandan lawyer

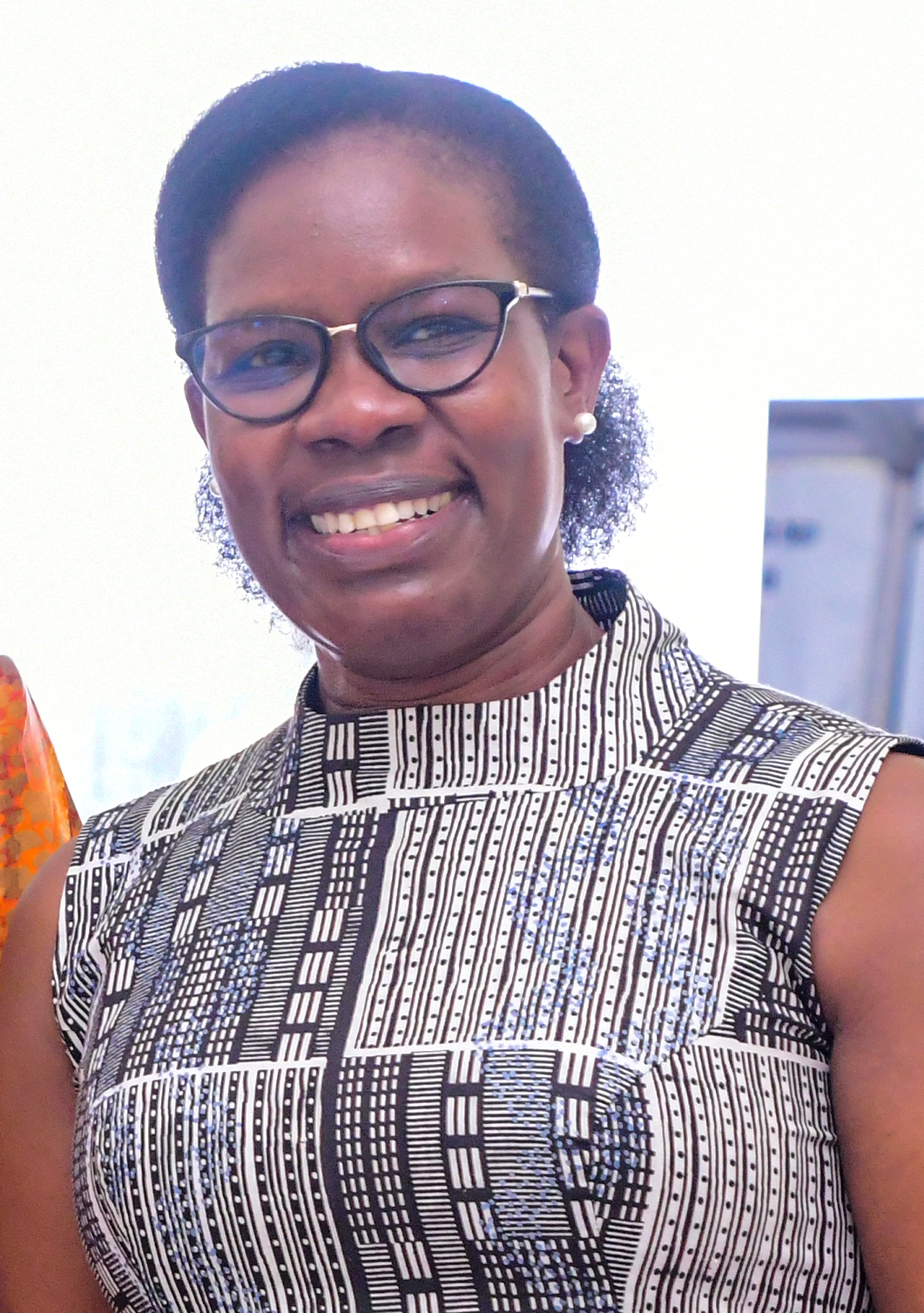
Dr Patricia Ochan

Patricia Ochan Okiria is the deputy inspector general of government for Uganda. She is a lawyer by profession and largely works as a human rights lawyer.

She was a member of Uganda Human Rights commission where she joined in 2019 until when she was named by the president as Deputy Inspector General Of Government.

== Education and work background ==
Okiria has a doctorate in law from the university of Pretoria in South Africa, a master of Laws from Pretoria as well, a post graduate diploma from law development center in Uganda and a bachelors degree of Law from Makerere University in Uganda.

She works as an advocate of the high court in Uganda, the vice president Uganda Christian Lawyers Fraternity.

Okiria is also a member of the Uganda Female Lawyers Fraternity.

She worked with the Ministry of works and transport as a policy and legal advisor from 2016 until she was appointed to Uganda Human rights Commission.

She served the directorate of ethics and integrity for six years as the principle legal advisor and later as acting director for legal issues.

She currently serves as the Deputy Inspector General Of Government as well as the President Of the east African association of anti-corruption Authorities. She has participated in the fight against corruption.

She has written a lot of publications including The Best Practices on State reporting and The IDP crisis in Africa.
