= Football in Burundi =

- Country: Burundi
- Governing body: Football Federation of Burundi
- National team: national football team

Club competitions
- Burundi Premier League

International competitions
- Champions League; CAF Confederation Cup; Super Cup; FIFA Club World Cup; FIFA World Cup(National Team); African Cup of Nations(National Team)

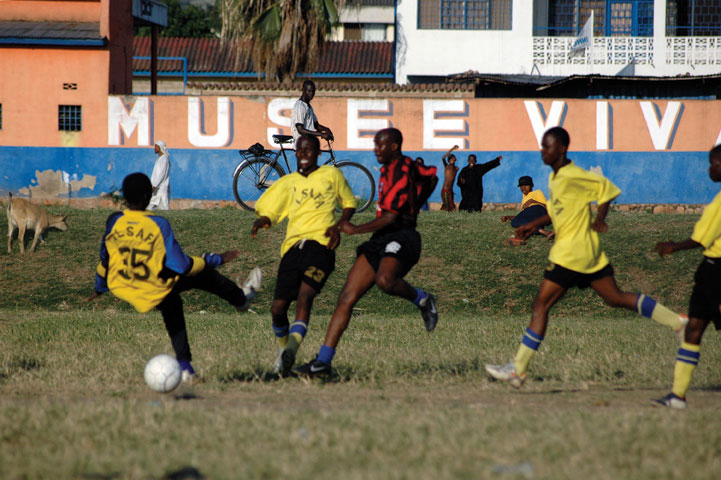
Football in Burundi

Football in Burundi has been affected by the civil war that broke out in Burundi. Before that, Burundi football had been doing well. Football is the most popular sport in Burundi. Approximately a quarter of the people in Burundi are considered association football fans.

== History ==
The football club Vital'O reached the final of the most prestigious African competition; Inter FC and reached the semifinals.

Just two nights before the war broke out in Burundi, the national team was in Guinea to play the host in the second leg of the playoffs to qualify for the African Nations Cup. The Burundian youth team reached the semi-final of the African Nations Youth Cup as well as qualifying in the World Youth Championship in Qatar.

In the Homeless World Cup, Burundi won the 2006 INSP Trophy, defeating Argentina in the final.

Saido Berahino is the most famous Burundian footballer.

In 2019, Burundi qualified for the Africa Cup of Nations for the first time in its history after finishing third in Group C of the qualifiers.

== League system ==
Level	League(s)/Division(s)	
1	Primus Ligue; 14 clubs	
2	Ligue B : Bujumbura; 7 clubs	Ligue B : Intérieur; 11 clubs divided in 2 series, one of 6 clubs and one of 5 clubs

== Women's football ==
Women's football in Burundi is growing in the country.

== Football stadiums in Burundi ==
#	Stadium	Capacity	City	Tenants	Image
1	Peace Park Stadium	35,000	Makamba	Aigle Noir Makamba FC	
2	Intwari Stadium	22,000	Bujumbura	AS Inter Star, Bujumbura City FC, Rukinzo FC, Vital'O FC	
3	Stade Ingoma	10,000	Gitega	Flambeau du Centre, Musongati FC	

== Attendances ==
The average attendance per top-flight football league season and the club with the highest average attendance:

Season	League average	Best club	Best club average
2022-23	1,814	Musongati FC	4,984

Source: League page on Wikipedia

== See also ==
- Lists of stadiums
