= Volontaires FC =

Burundian football club

Volontaires
- Full name: Volontaires FC
- Founded: 2005
- Ground: Stade Kanyosha; Kanyosha, Burundi
- Capacity: 1,000
- League: Burundi Premier League
- 2013–14: 12th

Volontaires is a football (soccer) club from Kanyosha, Burundi.

The team currently plays in the Burundi Premier League.

The club was founded in 2005.

== League participations ==
- Burundi Premier League: 2013–
- Burundi Second Division: ????–2013

== Stadium ==
Currently the team plays at the 1,000 capacity Stade Kanyosha.
