= Olympic Star Muyinga FC =

Olympic Star
- Full name: Olympic Star Muyinga Football Club
- Founded: 1997; 29 years ago
- Ground: Stade Municipal de Muyinga
- Capacity: 10,000
- League: Ligue A
- 2025–26: Ligue A, 9th of 16
Home colours	Away colours

Olympic Star Muyinga Football Club, commonly referred to as Olympic Star de Muyinga or simply as Olympic Star is a professional football club based in Muyinga, Burundi. The team currently plays in Ligue A, the top division of Burundi football.

== History ==
It was founded in 1997 in the city of Muyinga and played for the first time in the top-flight of the Burundian football in 2005, after the introduction of the sixteen-team format. A year earlier, she had created a sensation by reaching the final of the Coupe de l'Unité, lost against Muzinga (0–3).

Relegated at the end of the 2009 season, Olympic returned to the top tier, winning Group B of the Second Division in the 2013–14 season.

The club managed to win the Coupe du Président de la République in the 2016–17 season, beating Le Messager Ngozi in the final 2–1 in extra time, with a goal by Slim Saidi in the 98 minute.

The first appearance in an international tournament was in the 2018 season of the CAF Confederation Cup. There they faced in the preliminary round the Burkinabé club Étoile Filante, and after a 0–0 draw in the 1st leg, they won 1–0 at Ouagadougou in 2nd leg, qualifying in the first round where they were eliminated by Al-Hilal Al-Ubayyid from Sudan, 0–0 at Urukundo Stadium in Ngozi and 0–6 at El Obeid.

== Honours ==
Burundian Cup

- Winners (1): 2017

Burundian Super Cup

- Winners (1): 2017

== Performance in CAF competitions ==
Season	Competition	Round	Club	Home	Away	Aggregate
2018	CAF Confederation Cup	Preliminary round	(Burkina Faso) Étoile Filante	0–0	1–0	1–0
2018	CAF Confederation Cup	First round	(Sudan) Al-Hilal Al-Ubayyid	0–0	0–6	0–6

== Current team ==
As of 22 October 2022

Note: Flags indicate national team as defined under FIFA eligibility rules; some limited exceptions apply. Players may hold more than one non-FIFA nationality.

No.	Pos.	Nation	Player
10	GK	BDI	Akonkwa Akimana
7	GK	BDI	Amisi Issa Ndikuriyo
8	GK	BDI	Darcy Irakoze
12	DF	BDI	Emile Balama
20	DF	BDI	Eric Kwizera
21	DF	BDI	Fabrice Mayanga
4	DF	BDI	Hassan Nzeyimana
14	DF	BDI	Ibrahim Ntamwishimiro
27	DF	BDI	Isaac Niyongkuru
23	DF	BDI	Ismail Kabuntu

No.	Pos.	Nation	Player
17	MF	BDI	Issa Bizimungu
15	MF	BDI	Issa Havyarimana
19	MF	BDI	Kevin Uwimana
22	MF	BDI	Kofi Bigirimana
2	MF	BDI	Nasri Samiri
5	MF	BDI	Pascal Ramazani
1	MF	BDI	Ramadhan Oma
6	FW	BDI	Rashidi Nibitanga
11	FW	BDI	Ribery Niyonkuru
9	FW	BDI	Amissi Itangishaka
