= Espoir FC de Mutimbuzi =

- Full name: Espoir Football Club de Mutimbuzi
- Ground: Stade Municipal; Gatumba, Burundi
- Capacity: 2,000
- League: Burundi Premier League

Espoir Football Club de Mutimbuzi is a football (soccer) club from Burundi based in Mutimbuzi. Their home venue is the 2,000-capacity Stade Municipal.

The team currently plays in Burundi Premier League the top level of Burundian football.
