= Le Messager FC de Bujumbura =

- Full name: Le Messager Football Club de Bujumbura
- Founded: 2005
- League: Burundi Premier League
- 2017–18: 13th

Le Messager FC de Bujumbura is a football club from Burundi. The team currently plays in Burundi Premier League.
