= Royal FC de Muramvya =

Royal
- Full name: Royal FC de Muramvya
- Founded: 1989
- Ground: Stade Municipal de Muramvya; Muramvya, Burundi
- Capacity: 2,000
- League: Burundi Premier League
- 2025–26: 4th

Royal FC de Muramvya or simply Royal is an association football club from Burundi based in Muramvya. Their home venue is 2,000 capacity Stade Municipal de Muramvya.

The team currently plays in Burundi Premier League the top level of Burundian football.

The club was founded in 1989.
