= Magara Star FC =

Magara Star
- Full name: Magara Star Football Club
- Founded: 31 March 2014; 11 years ago
- Ground: Magara Football Stadium
- Coordinates: 3°43′28.1″S 29°18′55.6″E
- Chairman: John-Clinton Nsengiyumva
- Manager: Patrick Niyokwizera
- Coach: Denis Wembo
- League: Burundi Premier League
- Website: http://www.magarastarfc.com/home
Home colours	Away colours

Magara Star Football Club is a football (soccer) club from Magara town of Bugarama Commune in the province of Rumonge, Burundi. The team currently plays in Burundi Premier League. The team was founded on March 31, 2014, by John-Clinton Nsengiyumva through his philanthropic foundation, Nsengiyumva Global Development.

== History ==
On January 6, 2016, John-Clinton Nsengiyumva, the Chairperson of the Magara Star FC, acquired Nyanza-Lac United FC from Nyanza-Lac City in Makamka Province of Burundi and moved the acquired team to Magara town in Rumonge Province.

On January 9, 2016, John-Clinton Nsengiyumva merged Nyanza-Lac United FC into Magara Star FC and the local play-ground for former Nyanza-Lac United became The Stadium of Magara.

On January 16, 2016, in at Magara Stadium, Magara Star FC played its first match at the First Division level in Burundi. And this was also the first time, a team from Magara ever played at that level of soccer games and it was the first time a match of the first division in Burundi was ever played at Magara. The score was Magara Star FC 4 – 0 Olympic de Muremera FC.

== Performance in Competitions ==
- 2014 Bujumbura 3rd Division League: Position #1.
- 2015–2016 National First Division League: Position #12.

== Honours ==
- Champion of 2014 Bujumbura Provincial Football Association Cup for Third Division.

== Personnel ==
=== Current technical staff ===
Position	Staff
Head coach	Denis Wembo
Assistant coach	Innocent Hatungimana
Technical Director (Manager)	Patrick Niyokwizera
Secretary & Logistics Officer	Augustin Niyubahwe

- Last updated: 20 May 2016
- Source: Magara Star FC

=== Management ===
Position	Staff
President	John-Clinton Nsengiyumva
Vice-president	Désiré Manirakiza
Secretary General	Zéckis Minani
Treasurer General	Jean Pierre Bacanamwo
Adviser General	Issa Nzojibwami
