= CECAFA Nile Basin Cup =

- Founded: 2014
- Region: CECAFA
- Current champions: (Uganda) Victoria University (1st title)
- Most championships: (Uganda) Victoria University (1 title)
- Broadcaster: SuperSport
- 2014 CECAFA Nile Basin Cup

The CECAFA Nile Basin Cup, also known as the CECAFA Nile Basin Winners' Cup, is a football club tournament organised by CECAFA that is contested by clubs from East and Central Africa. The creation of the tournament was announced in May 2014, with the inaugural edition taking place in Sudan between 23 May and 4 June 2014.

== Previous winners ==
=== Finals ===
List of CECAFA Nile Basin Cup winners
Year	Country	Winners	Score	Runners-up	Country	Hosts
2014	Uganda	Victoria University	2–1	A.F.C. Leopards	Kenya	Sudan

=== Winners and runners-up ===
Club	Winners	Runners-up	Years won	Years runners-up
(Uganda) Victoria University	1	0	2014	
(Kenya) A.F.C. Leopards	0	1		2014

=== By nation ===
Performance by nation
Nation	Winners	Runners-up	Winning Clubs
Uganda	1	0	1
Kenya	0	1	0

== See also ==
- CECAFA Club Cup
- CECAFA Cup
