= Flambeau de l'Est FC =

Burundian association football club

Flambeau de l’Est
- Full name: Flambeau de l’Est Football Club
- Founded: 2010; 15 years ago
- Ground: Stade de Ruyigi; Ruyigi, Burundi
- Capacity: 2,000
- League: Ligue B
- 2021–22: Ligue A, 15th of 16 (relegated)
Home colours	Third colours

Flambeau de l'Est Football Club is a Burundian professional football club based in Ruyigi in the Ruyigi Province of Burundi. The club competes in Ligue B, the second level of Burundi's football league system, and plays its home matches at Stade de Ruyigi.

== History ==
The club was founded in 2010 in the city of Ruyigi and began to playing in the Intérieur Series of the Second Division of Burundi, obtaining promotion to the top flight in that debut season. The first season in the Ligue A was quite good as they finished in fourth position out of 12 teams and reached the semi-finals of the Coupe du Président de la République, where was eliminated by Vital'O 0–1.

The 2012–13 season was more than a confirmation, since Flambeau de l'Est, coached by Olivier Niyungeko, was crowned champion of Burundi after a great season in which they only lost one game and conceded only eight goals. This was a historic title, since the club was the first outside the capital, Bujumbura, to win the competition.

The good results continued in the following season with a second place in the Primus Ligue, three points behind LLB Academic. In their inaugural Champions League campaign, Flambeau faced in the preliminary round the runners-up of Congo Ligue 1, Diables Noirs, qualifying to first round after a 2–1 win in aggregate. In the first round faced the Cameroonian side Coton Sport Garoua, a team with several appearances in the tournament, Flambeau won the first leg in Burundi 1–0, but they could not keep the advantage in the 2nd leg, being eliminated after 0–5 at Garoua.

== Honours ==
Burundi Ligue A

- Winners (1): 2012–13
- Runners–up (1): 2013–14

Burundi Ligue B

- Winners (1): 2010–11

== Performance in CAF competitions ==
Season	Competition	Round	Club	Home	Away	Aggregate
2014	CAF Champions League	Preliminary round	(Republic of the Congo) Diables Noirs	1–1	1–0	2–1
2014	CAF Champions League	First round	(Cameroon) Coton Sport Garoua	1–0	0–5	1–5
