= Rusizi FC =

Football club in Burundi

- Full name: Rusizi Football Club
- Founded: 2011
- Ground: Stade Municipal, Cibitoke, Burundi
- League: Burundi Premier League

Rusizi Football Club is a football club from the city of Cibitoke in Burundi. The team currently plays in the top domestic Burundi Premier League and have their home games in the Stade Municipal.

The club was founded in 2011.
