= Bujumbura City FC =

- Full name: Bujumbura City Football Club
- Founded: 2011; 15 years ago as Guêpiers du Lac
- Ground: Intwari Stadium; Bujumbura, Burundi
- Capacity: 10,000
- League: Burundi Ligue B
- 2025–26: Ligue B, 5th Group 5

Bujumbura City Football Club is a Burundian professional football club based in Bujumbura, that competes in the Burundi Ligue A, the top tier of Burundi football.

The club was founded in 2011 as Guêpiers du Lac and was renamed in 2014 as Bujumbura City FC.

== Stadium ==
Currently the team plays at the 22,000 capacity Intwari Stadium in Bujumbura.

== League participations ==
- Burundi Premier League: 2013–present
- Burundi Second Division: 2011–2013
