= Ruyigi =

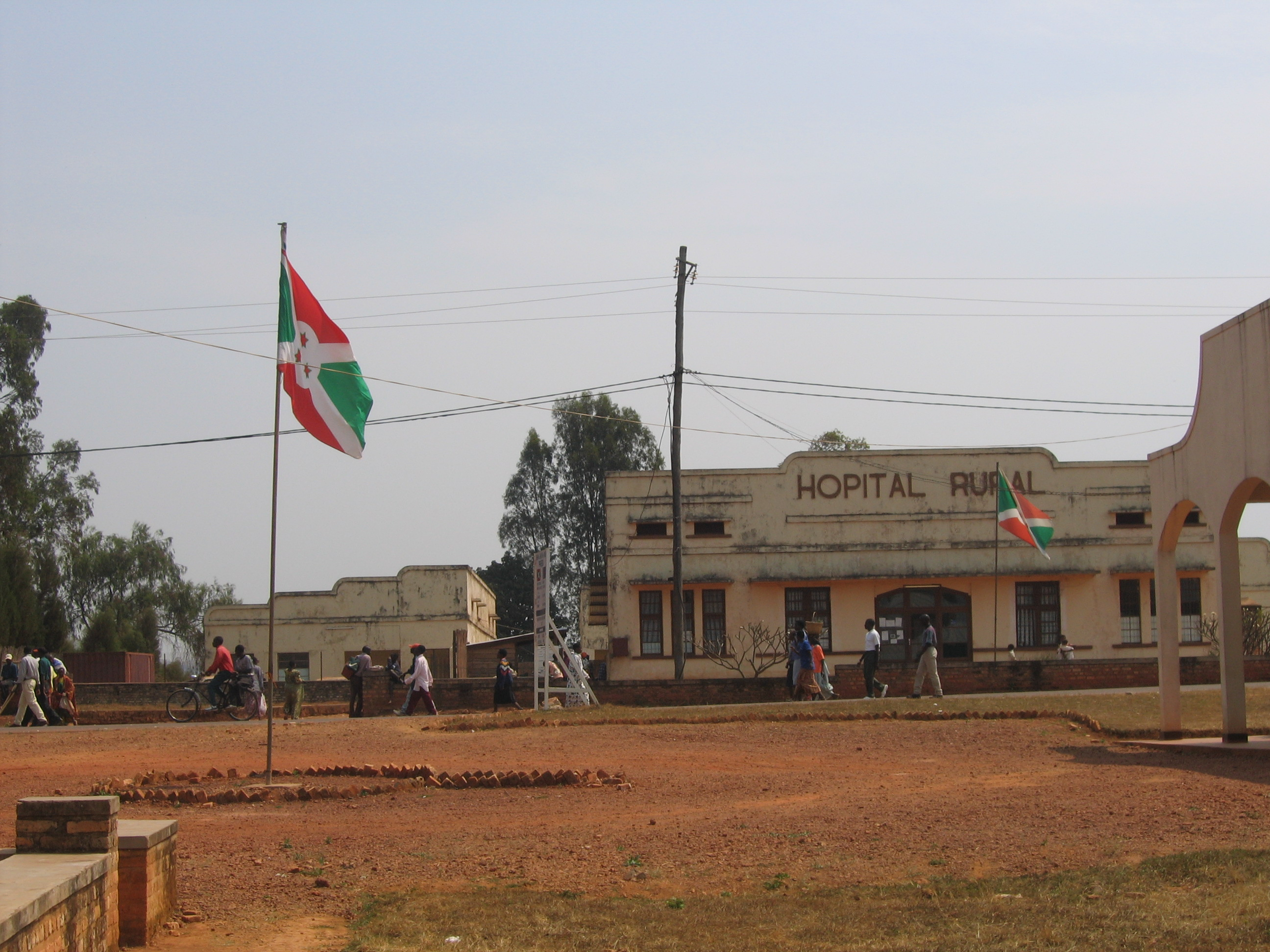
- Hospital in Ruyigi

- Location in Burundi
- Coordinates: 3°29′S 30°15′E
- Country: Burundi
- Province: Ruyigi Province
- Elevation: 6,043 ft (1,842 m)

Population (2012)
  - Total: 44,220

Ruyigi is a city located in eastern Burundi. It is the capital city of Ruyigi Province.

It is served by Ruyigi Airport, a 900 metres (3,000 ft) grass airstrip 1.6 kilometres (1 mi) west of the town.
