= Prince Louis FC =

- Full name: Prince Louis Football Club
- Ground: Prince Louis Rwagasore Stadium, Bujumbura, Burundi
- Capacity: 22,000
- League: Burundi Premier League
- 2013–14: Burundi Premier League, 7th

Prince Louis Football Club is a football club from Bujumbura, Burundi. It is named in honour of the independence hero Prince Louis Rwagasore.

== Honours ==
- Burundi Premier League: 2

1976, 2001

- Burundian Cup: 1

1992

== Performance in CAF competitions ==
- CAF Champions League: 1 appearance

2002 – Preliminary Round

- CAF Confederation Cup: 1 appearance

2007 – Preliminary Round

- CAF Cup Winners' Cup: 1 appearance

1993 – Second Round
