= Muzinga FC =

Football club in Bujumbura, Burundi

Muzinga
- Full name: Muzinga Football Club
- Founded: 1985
- Ground: Prince Louis Rwagasore Stadium; Bujumbura, Burundi
- Capacity: 22,000
- League: Burundi Premier League
- 2025–26: 8th

Muzinga Football Club or simply Muzinga is a football (soccer) club from Burundi based in Bujumbura. Their home venue is 22,000 capacity Prince Louis Rwagasore Stadium.

The team currently plays in Burundi Premier League the top level of Burundian football.

The club was founded in 1985.

== Honours ==
- Burundi Premier League: 1

2002

- Burundian Cup: 1

1987
