= Lydia Ludic Burundi Académic FC =

Burundi football club

LLB Académic FC
- Full name: Lydia Ludic Burundi Académic Football Club
- Founded: 2007
- Ground: Prince Louis Rwagasore Stadium, Bujumbura, Burundi
- Capacity: 10,000
- League: Ligue B
- 2025–26: 2nd in A Group

Lydia Ludic Burundi Académic Football Club or simply LLB Académic FC is an association football club from Burundi based in Bujumbura. Their home venue is 10,000 capacity Prince Louis Rwagasore Stadium.

The club was founded in 2007.

== Honours ==
- Burundi Premier League
  - Winners (2): 2013–14, 2016–17
  - Runners-up (1): 2010–11
- Burundian Cup
  - Winners (3): 2011, 2012, 2014
  - Runners-up (1): 2013
- Burundi Super Cup
  - Winners (1): 2012

== Performance in CAF competitions ==
- CAF Confederation Cup: 2 appearances

2012 – First Round
2013 –
Preliminary round :
LLB Académic – (Rwanda) Police : 1–0
(Rwanda) Police – LLB Académic : 1–1
First round :
(Democratic Republic of the Congo) Motema Pembe – LLB Académic : 1–0
LLB Académic – (Democratic Republic of the Congo) Motema Pembe : 2–0
Second round :
(Ivory Coast) ASEC Mimosas – LLB Académic : 1–0
LLB Académic – (Ivory Coast) ASEC Mimosas : 1–0 (4–2 pens)
Play-off round :
(Mali) Stade Malien – LLB Académic: 5–0
LLB Académic – Stade Malien: 0–1

- CAF Champions League: 1 appearance

2015 – Preliminary Round
