= Bukhungu Stadium =

Sports venue in Kenya

- Interactive map of Bukhungu Stadium
- Full name: Bukhungu Stadium
- Location: Kakamega, Kenya
- Owner: County Government of Kakamega
- Operator: County Government of Kakamega
- Capacity: 25,000
- Surface: Grass

Construction
- Opened: closed

Tenants
- Kakamega Homeboyz; West Kenya Sugar; Western Stima

The Bukhungu Stadium is a multi-purpose stadium in Kakamega, Kenya. It used mostly for football matches and is the home stadium of Western Stima of the Kenyan Premier League. The stadium has a capacity of 25,000. It is intended to be used for the 2027 Africa Cup of Nations

The stadium has been undergoing renovation and expansion with phase one of the main stand complete. Phase 2 involving the rest of the terraces and running track already commenced. The stadium's name came from Idaho name "okhungwa" meaning being chased away. The ground was used by European in 19th century for relaxing and enjoying western breeze from kakamega forest just located east of stadium, so police used to chase Africans away of field to not interfere with white people, so luhyas called the field " shikuri shukhukhungwa" "ebukhungu" meaning the field of being chased away.
