= AS Inter Star =

- Full name: Association Sportif Inter Star
- Founded: 1977
- Ground: Prince Louis Rwagasore Stadium, Bujumbura, Burundi
- Capacity: 10,000
- Manager: Belyse Ininahazwe league = Burundi Premier League
- 2025–26: 13th
Home colours

Association Sportif Inter Star, is an association football club from Bujumbura, Burundi.

== Honours ==
- Burundi Premier League: 4

1991, 1992, 2005, 2008

- Burundian Cup: 1

1990

- Burundi Super Cup: 1

2011

== Performance in CAF competitions ==
- CAF Champions League: 2 appearances

2006 – first round
2009 – preliminary round

- CAF Confederation Cup: 2 appearances

2008 – preliminary round
2011 – preliminary round

== Squad ==
As of 29 October 2022

Note: Flags indicate national team as defined under FIFA eligibility rules; some limited exceptions apply. Players may hold more than one non-FIFA nationality.

No.	Pos.	Nation	Player
1	GK	BDI	Joseph Rungerinyange
22	DF	BDI	Abdou Erve Mohamedi
3	DF	BDI	Ramadhani Bigirimana
7	DF	BDI	Abdoul Ndayisaba
9	DF	BDI	Radjabu Ntakarutimana
13	DF	BDI	Merveille Mongo Makambo
15	MF	BDI	Patrick Mutimana

No.	Pos.	Nation	Player
17	MF	BDI	Bilali Billo
20	FW	BDI	Mohamed Nampaka Mussa Chibwabwa
23	MF	BDI	Akbar Assumani
25	FW	BDI	Bienvenu Irakoze
12	GK	BDI	Jean Petit Nzeyimana
14	FW	BDI	Jean Issa Fataki
18	MF	BDI	Steve Toyi
19	MF	BDI	Salim Ndayishimiye
21	MF	BDI	Darcy Irishura
24	FW	BDI	Songa Ndikumana

== Management and staff ==
Management and staff as of 12 August 2022
Position	Name
Head coach	(Burundi) Michael Tuhabonye
Assistant coach	(Burundi) Amissi Bagumako
Manager	(Burundi) Amissi Bagumako
Team Doctor	(Burundi) Dieudonne Nduwimana
Goalkeeper Coach	(Burundi) Boduin Nshimirimana
Kit Manager	(Burundi) Jumatatu Ruvyogo
