= Atlético Olympic FC =

Athletico New Oil Football Academy
- Full name: Athletico New Oil Football Academy
- Nickname: Atlético
- Founded: 31 March 2005; 21 years ago
- Ground: Prince Louis Rwagasore Stadium; Bujumbura, Burundi
- Capacity: 10,000
- Chairman: Apollinaire Kazohera
- Manager: Dieudonne 'Kembo' Mugunga
- League: Burundi Ligue A
- Website: https://www.owsports.info/leagues/50033/teams/241387

Athletico New Oil Football Academy is a Burundian football club located in Bujumbura, Burundi. It currently plays in the Burundi Premier League. The club is coached by Dieudonné Mugunga formerly of Bukavu Dawa of Linafoot Super League, DRC.He is the fifth coach in ten months after stints by Nahimana Hussein, Omar Ntakagero, Amidou Hassan and Nzeyimana Mailo.

== History ==
Athletico New Oil Football Academy was started in 2005 as Atletico Olympique in Bujumbura City. In 2020, they won promotion the Primus League.Businessman Apollinaire Kazohera bought the club and relocated it to Muyinga, a city located in northern Burundi and the capital of Muyinga Province. The team then changed its name to Athletico New Oil.

== Honours ==
- Burundi Premier League: 2

2004, 2010–11

- Burundian Cup: 1

2000

== Performance in CAF competitions ==
- CAF Champions League: 1 appearance

2012 – Preliminary Round

- CAF Confederation Cup: 1 appearance

2010 – Preliminary Round

== Squad ==
As of 12 August 2022

Note: Flags indicate national team as defined under FIFA eligibility rules; some limited exceptions apply. Players may hold more than one non-FIFA nationality.

No.	Pos.	Nation	Player
16	GK	BDI	Samuel Julien
14	DF	BDI	John Mwenebantu
2	DF	BDI	Thierry Sindayigaya
3	DF	BDI	Faustin Edgar Ndikumana
4	MF	BDI	Thelence Rukundo
11	MF	BDI	Lionel Nzoyihiki
12	MF	BDI	Dolie Uwimana
17	FW	BDI	Theodore Ngabirano
23	FW	BDI	Wilson Hategekimana
25	FW	BDI	Cesar Tuombe

No.	Pos.	Nation	Player
28	MF	BDI	Joseph Ntamack Tonye
1	GK	BDI	Haile Shalom Nduwimana
6	DF	BDI	Richard Nzobaza
7	DF	BDI	Junior Nduwimana
8	DF	BDI	Yasser Arafat Tuyisenge
10	MF	BDI	Clovis Nduwayezu
15	MF	BDI	Flavier Ingabire
24	FW	BDI	Rashid Mohamed Mchelenga
30	FW	BDI	Rashid Maume Nahiana
20	FW	BDI	Sefu Ndizeye
