= Burundian Cup =

Coupe du Président de la République
- Founded: 1982
- Region: Burundi
- Qualifier for: CAF Confederation Cup
- 2026 Coupe du Président de la République

The Coupe du Président de la République is the top knockout tournament of the Burundian football.

== Winners ==
- 1982: Vital'O
- 1983: Inter
- 1984: Inter
- 1985: Vital'O
- 1986: Vital'O
- 1987: Muzinga
- 1988: Vital'O
- 1989: Vital'O
- 1990: Inter Star ou Inter
- 1991: Vital'O
- 1992: Prince Louis
- 1993: Vital'O
- 1994: Vital'O
- 1995: Vital'O
- 1996: Vital'O
- 1997: Vital'O
- 1998: Elite
- 1999: Vital'O
- 2000: Athlético Olympic
- 2001: unknown
- 2002: unknown
- 2003: unknown
- 2004: unknown
- 2005: unknown
- 2006: unknown
- 2007: unknown
- 2008: unknown
- 2009: unknown
- 2010: unknown

Coupe du Président de la République

Season	Winners	Runners-up	Result	Date	Venue
2011	LLB Académic	Athlético Olympic	0–0 (6–5 p)	1 October 2011	?
2012	LLB Académic	Vital'O	1–0	15 September 2012	?

Coupe de la Confédération

Season	Winners	Runners-up	Result	Date	Venue
2013	Académie Tchité	LLB Académic	1–0 (a.e.t.)	22 September 2013	?

Coupe du Président de la République

- 2014: LLB Académic 1–1 (4–3 pen) Le Messager Ngozi
- 2015: Vital'O 2–2 (4–3 pen) Athlético Olympic
- 2016: Le Messager Ngozi 1–1 (aet, 4–3 pen) Vital'O
- 2017: Olympique Star 2–1 Le Messager Ngozi
- 2018: Vital'O 3–1 Delta Star
- 2019: Aigle Noir Makamba FC 3–1 Rukinzo
- 2020: Musongati 1–1 (aet, 5–4 pen) Rukinzo
- 2021: Bumamuru 3–1 Flambeau du Centre
- 2022: Bumamuru 3–1 Flambeau du Centre
- 2023: Aigle Noir Makamba 3–1 Bumamuru
- 2024 Rukinzo 2–1 Flambeau du Centre
- 2025 Flambeau du Centre 1–0 Musongati
- 2026 Rukinzo 1–0 Aigle Noir Makamba
