= Vital'O FC =

Association football club in Burundi

Vital 'O FC
- Full name: Vital'O Football Club
- Founded: 1957; 69 years ago
- Ground: Intwari Stadium
- Capacity: 10,000
- League: Burundi Ligue A
- 2025–26: Ligue A, 6th of 16
| Home colours | Away colours |

Vital'O FC is a professional football club based in Bujumbura, Burundi. The team currently plays in the Burundi Ligue A, the top division of Burundi football.

== History ==
They were founded as Gwanda, Sport FC in the 1960s, changed their name to ALTECO in 1971, to Tout Puissant Bata in 1973, then merged with Rapid to become Espoir soon after and finally became Vital'ô around 1975.

== Honours ==
=== National ===
- Burundi Premier League: 21
  - 1971, 1979, 1980, 1981, 1983, 1984, 1986, 1990, 1994, 1996, 1998, 1999, 2000, 2006, 2007, 2009, 2010, 2011–12, 2014–15, 2015–16, 2023–24
- Burundian Cup: 14
  - 1982, 1985, 1986, 1988, 1989, 1991, 1993, 1994, 1995, 1996, 1997, 1999, 2015, 2018
- Burundi Super Cup: 2
  - 2015, 2016

=== Continental ===
- African Cup Winners' Cup
  - Finalist in the African Cup Winners' Cup in 1992 (defeated by Africa Sports of Ivory Coast)
- Kagame Interclub Cup: 3 appearances
  - 2013 – Winner

== Current team ==
As of 12 October 2022

Note: Flags indicate national team as defined under FIFA eligibility rules; some limited exceptions apply. Players may hold more than one non-FIFA nationality.

| No. | Pos. | Nation | Player |
|---|---|---|---|
| 7 | MF | BDI | Abdoul Irankunda |
| 24 | MF | BDI | Alfani Bigirimana |
| 6 | MF | BDI | Alphat Niyera |
| 3 | DF | BDI | Amedee Ndavyutse |
| 17 | FW | BDI | Amissi Leon Irakoze |
| 19 | FW | BDI | Chris Neddy Bishaza |
| 12 | DF | BDI | Edouard Nizigiyimana |
| 4 | DF | BDI | Fred Niyonizeye |
| 5 | MF | BDI | Gerard Ndayongeje |
| 1 | GK | BDI | Hussein Ndayishimiye |

| No. | Pos. | Nation | Player |
|---|---|---|---|
| 13 | FW | BDI | Juma Nyenyezi |
| 27 | FW | BDI | July Rusengo |
| 15 | MF | BDI | Kalimu Irakoze |
| 22 | GK | BDI | Mossi Halidi |
| 8 | MF | MAW | Mpuki Juslain Mbembi |
| 18 | DF | BDI | Pascal Bukuru |
| 23 | DF | BDI | Prince Michel Musore |
| 20 | MF | BDI | Rahim Nsengiyumva |
| 26 | FW | BDI | Ramazani Abdoul Karim |
| 10 | MF | BDI | Sunzu Bonheur Mende |

== Performance in CAF competitions ==
- CAF Champions League: 8 appearances

1999 – Second Round
2000 – Second Round
2001 – First Round

2007 – Preliminary Round
2008 – Preliminary Round
2010 – Preliminary Round

2011 – Preliminary Round
2013 –

- CAF Confederation Cup: 1 appearance

2009 – Preliminary Round

- African Cup of Champions Clubs: 5 appearances

1982 – First Round
1984 – First Round

1985 – Quarter-finals
1991 – Second Round

1993 – First Round

- CAF Cup: 1 appearance

1996 – Preliminary Round

- CAF Cup Winners' Cup: 9 appearances

1983 – First Round
1986 – First Round
1983 – Quarter-finals

1989 – First Round
1990 – Quarter-finals
1992 – Finalist

1995 – Second Round
1996 – First Round
1998 – withdrew in First Round
