= Burundi Ligue A =

- Organising body: Fédération de Football du Burundi
- Founded: 1972; 54 years ago
- Country: Burundi
- Confederation: CAF
- Number of clubs: 16
- Level on pyramid: 1
- Relegation to: Ligue B
- Domestic cup: Burundian Cup
- International cups: CAF Champions League; CAF Confederation Cup
- Current champions: Vital'O (2023–24)
- Most championships: Vital'O FC (20 titles)
- Website: ffb.bi
- Current: 2024–25 Burundi Ligue A

The Burundi Ligue A, also called Primus Ligue for sponsorship reasons, is the highest division in football in Burundi. The league was formed in 1972 and has 16 teams. They play 30 rounds home and away during a season.

== Current clubs ==
The following sixteen clubs are competing in the Primus Ligue during the 2022–23 season.

Team	Location	Stadium	Capacity
Le Messager Ngozi	Ngozi	Stade Urukundo	5,000
Musongati	Gitega	Stade Ingoma	10,000
Aigle Noir Makamba	Makamba	Stade Peace Park	35,000
BS Dynamik	Bujumbura	Stade Intwari	10,000
Flambeau du Centre	Gitega	Stade Ingoma	10,000
Vital'O	Bujumbura	Stade Intwari	10,000
Bujumbura City	Bujumbura	Stade Intwari	10,000
Olympic Star Muyinga	Muyinga	Stade Umuco	10,000
Rukinzo	Bujumbura	Stade Intwari	10,000
Inter Star	Bujumbura	Stade Intwari	10,000
Bumamuru	Buganda	Stade Urunani	7,000
Kayanza United	Kayanza	Stade de Gatwaro	10,000
Athlético New Oil	Muyinga	Stade Umuco	10,000
Top Junior	Kayanza	Stade de Gatwaro	10,000
Magara Young Boys	Buganda	Stade Urunani	7,000
Tigre Noir Ruyigi	Ruyigi	Stade de Ruyigi	2,000

== Previous champions ==
Years	Champions
1963	Stella Matutina FC (1)
1964	Stella Matutina FC (2)
1965	Maniema Fantastique (1)
1966	Maniema Fantastique (2)
1967	Maniema Fantastique (3)
1968	Maniema Fantastique (4)
1969	Espoir FC (1)
1970	Inter FC (1)
1971	Vital'O FC (1)
1972	BS Dynamik New Look (1)
1973	Non disputé
1974	Inter FC (2)
1975	Inter FC (3)
1976	Prince Louis FC (1)
1977	Inter FC (4)
1978	Inter FC (5)
1979	Vital’O FC (2)
1980	Vital’O FC (3)
1981	Vital’O FC (4)
1982	Maniema Fantastique (5)
1983	Vital’O FC (5)
1984	Vital’O FC (6)
1985	Inter FC (6)
1986	Vital’O FC (7)
1987	Inter FC (7)
1988	Inter FC (8)
1989	Inter FC (9)
1990	Vital’O FC (8)
1991	AS InterStar (1)
1992	AS InterStar (2)
1993	Championnat abandonné
1994	Vital’O FC (9)
1995	Maniema Fantastique (6)
1996	Vital’O FC (10)
1997	Maniema FC (1)
1998	Vital’O FC (11)
1999	Vital’O FC (12)
2000	Vital’O FC (13)
2001	Prince Louis FC (2)
2002	Muzinga FC (1)
2003	Championnat abandonné
2004	Atlético Olympic FC (1)
2005	AS InterStar (3)
2006	Vital’O FC (14)
2007	Vital’O FC (15)
2008	AS InterStar (4)
2009	Vital’O FC (16)
2010	Vital’O FC (17)
2010-2011	Atlético Olympic FC (2)
2011-2012	Vital’O FC (18)
2012-2013	Flambeau de l'Est (1)
2013-2014	LLB Académic (1)
2014-2015	Vital’O FC (19)
2015-2016	Vital’O FC (20)
2016-2017	LLB Académic (2)
2017-2018	Le Messager FC Ngozi (1)
2018-2019	Aigle Noir FC de Makamba (1)
2019-2020	Le Messager FC Ngozi (2)
2020-2021	Le Messager FC Ngozi (3)
2021-2022	Flambeau du Centre (1)
2022-2023	Bumamuru FC (1)
2023-24	Vital'O FC (21)

== Performance by club ==
Club	City	Titles	Last title
Vital'O (Includes TP Bata)	Bujumbura	21	2023-24
Inter	Bujumbura	9	1989
Maniema FC (Includes Fantastique)	Bujumbura	7	1997
Inter Star	Bujumbura	4	2008
Le Messager Ngozi	Ngozi	3	2020-21
LLB Sport 4 Africa (Includes LLB Académic)	Bujumbura	2	2016–17
Athlético Olympic	Bujumbura	2	2010–11
Prince Louis	Bujumbura	2	2001
Stella Matutina	Bujumbura	2	1964
Aigle Noir	Makamba	1	2018–19
Bumamuru	Buganda	1	2022-23
Flambeau de l'Est	Ruyigi	1	2012–13
Muzinga	Bujumbura	1	2002
Sports Dynamic	Bujumbura	1	1972
Espoir	Bujumbura	1	1969
Flambeau du Centre	Gitega	1	2021–22

== Top goalscorers ==
Year	Top scorers	Team	Goals
1998	(Burundi) Wembo Sutche	Vital'O	15
2007	(Burundi) Wembo Sutche	Vital'O	12
2008	(Burundi) Eric Gatoto	Vital'O	18
2013	(Burundi) Samuel Murray	Vital'O	33
2017–18	(Burundi) Bienvenue Shaka	Aigle Noir	29
2020–21	(Burundi) Ndikumana Asmani		14
2022–23	(Burundi) Jean Claude Girumugisha	Magara YB	16
2023-24	(Burundi) Destin Maniriho	Rukinzo	22

=== Multiple hat-tricks ===
Rank	Country	Player	Hat-tricks
1	(Burundi)	Destin Maniriho	1

== See also ==
Burundian Cup
