= Intwari Stadium =

Stadium in Bujumbura, Burundi

- Interactive map of Intwari Stadium
- Full name: Intwari Stadium
- Former names: Stade Prince Louis Rwagasore (1962–2019)
- Location: Bujumbura, Burundi
- Coordinates: 3°23′0″S 29°22′26″E
- Capacity: 22,000
- Surface: Artificial turf

Construction
- Opened: 1962
- Renovated: 2008, 2022–present

Tenant
- Burundi national football team

Intwari Stadium (English: Heroes' stadium) is a multi-purpose stadium in Bujumbura, Burundi. It is currently used mostly for football matches. It was refurbished through a FIFA Forward-supported project and is a 22,000-capacity venue.
It was formerly named after former Burundian prime minister and independence hero, Louis Rwagasore before being renamed on 1 July 2019.
