= 2022–23 Burundi Ligue A =

Burundi Ligue A
- Season: 2022–23
- Dates: 12 August 2022 –
- Top goalscorer: (Burundi) Jean Claude Girumugisha (16 goals)
- Average attendance: 1,595

The 2022–23 Burundi Ligue A season, also known as the Primus Ligue for sponsorship reasons, was the 60th edition of the top flight football competition in Burundi. The season began on 12 August 2022 and it concluded in May 2023. Flambeau du Centre is the defending champion.

== Teams ==
A total of sixteen clubs participate in this season. Thirteen teams from previous season and three new promoted sides.

Promoted from Ligue B

- Inter Star
- Tigre Noir Ruyigi
- Magara Young Boys

Relegated from Ligue A

- Les Crocos
- Flambeau de l'Est
- Royal de Muramvya

=== Stadiums and locations ===
Team	Location	Stadium	Capacity
Le Messager Ngozi	Ngozi	Stade Urukundo	5,000
Musongati	Gitega	Stade Ingoma	10,000
Aigle Noir Makamba	Makamba	Stade Peace Park	35,000
BS Dynamik	Bujumbura	Stade Intwari	10,000
Flambeau du Centre	Gitega	Stade Ingoma	10,000
Vital'O	Bujumbura	Stade Intwari	10,000
Bujumbura City	Bujumbura	Stade Intwari	10,000
Olympic Star Muyinga	Muyinga	Stade Umuco	10,000
Rukinzo	Bujumbura	Stade Intwari	10,000
Inter Star	Bujumbura	Stade Intwari	10,000
Bumamuru	Buganda	Stade Urunani	7,000
Kayanza United	Kayanza	Stade de Gatwaro	10,000
Athlético New Oil	Muyinga	Stade Umuco	10,000
Top Junior	Kayanza	Stade de Gatwaro	10,000
Magara Young Boys	Buganda	Stade Urunani	7,000
Tigre Noir Ruyigi	Ruyigi	Stade de Ruyigi	2,000

== League table ==
Pos	Team	Pld	W	D	L	GF	GA	GD	Pts	Qualification or relegation
1	Bumamuru (C)	30	20	8	2	71	21	+50	68	Qualification for the CAF Champions League
2	Flambeau du Centre	30	20	7	3	55	27	+28	67	
3	Le Messager Ngozi	30	16	8	6	44	19	+25	56	
4	Vital'O	30	15	9	6	42	30	+12	54	
5	Aigle Noir Makamba	30	14	11	5	34	24	+10	53	
6	Rukinzo	30	11	9	10	29	32	−3	42	
7	Kayanza United	30	11	7	12	34	39	−5	40	
8	Musongati	30	8	13	9	33	35	−2	37	
9	Olympic Star Muyinga	30	10	7	13	30	35	−5	37	
10	Tigre Noir Ruyigi	30	8	10	12	34	34	0	34	
11	Magara Young Boys	30	9	7	14	38	50	−12	34	
12	Athlético New Oil	30	8	6	16	30	48	−18	30	
13	Inter Star	30	7	8	15	25	47	−22	29	
14	Bujumbura City (R)	30	6	9	15	30	43	−13	27	Relegation to Burundi Ligue B
15	BS Dynamik (R)	30	6	8	16	19	41	−22	26	Relegation to Burundi Ligue B
16	Top Junior (R)	30	4	7	19	16	39	−23	19	Relegation to Burundi Ligue B

Source: Soccerway
Rules for classification: 1) points; 2) head-to-head points; 3) head-to-head goal difference; 4) head-to-head goals scored; 5) head-to-head away goals scored; 6) goal difference; 7) goals scored;
(C) Champions; (R) Relegated

== Results ==
Home \ Away	AGN	ATL	BJC	BUM	DYN	FDC	INT	KAY	LMN	MYB	TOP	MUS	TNO	OLS	RUK	VIT
Aigle Noir	—	1–1	1–0	2–1	0–0	1–1	2–0	2–1	2–2	2–1	1–0	3–1	1–0	1–0	0–1	0–0
Athlético New Oil	1–2	—	3–2	1–4	0–1	2–4	2–0	1–2	0–0	2–1	0–0	0–2	0–0	1–3	0–1	0–3
Bujumbura City	1–2	2–0	—	1–1	2–0	1–3	0–0	2–2	1–2	0–2	3–1	1–1	1–1	0–1	1–2	0–0
Bumamuru	1–1	4–0	2–0	—	4–2	1–1	5–0	7–1	1–0	5–0	1–0	4–1	1–1	5–0	1–0	4–1
BS Dynamik	0–1		0–0	0–0	—	1–2	3–2	0–0	0–3	0–4	2–0	0–0	1–1	0–0	0–1	0–1
Flambeau du Centre	2–0	4–1	3–0	3–0	2–1	—	2–1	1–1	3–1	4–1	3–2	1–1	2–1	1–0	1–0	2–1
Inter Star	0–0	3–2	1–2	1–1	0–1	1–1	—	1–2	0–4	1–0	2–0	0–4	1–0	1–4	1–0	0–2
Kayanza United	1–0	1–3	2–1	0–0	1–2	2–0	0–0	—	1–0	3–0	1–0	0–1	2–0	2–0	1–0	1–2
Le Messager Ngozi	0–0	1–0	0–1	0–1	2–1	0–1	1–0	2–1	—	0–0	3–1	4–1	1–1	2–0	0–0	1–1
Magara Young Boys	1–1	0–1	2–1	2–4	1–1	2–1	1–1	1–0	0–5	—	5–1	2–1	1–3	1–2	2–0	1–2
Top Junior	0–2	2–1	1–1	0–1	3–0	0–1	1–2	0–0	0–1	0–0	—	0–0	1–0	0–2	0–2	1–1
Musongati	0–0	1–3	2–1	1–2	2–3	2–2	1–0	2–1	0–1	1–0	2–0	—	2–2	0–0		0–1
Tigre Noir	4–2	1–2	1–1	1–1	3–0	0–1	0–1	4–1	0–1	3–1	1–0	1–3	—	1–0	1–1	0–0
Olympic Star	2–3	0–0	2–0	0–1	2–0	1–2	1–1	3–1	0–0	0–2	0–1	0–0	2–0	—	1–1	1–3
Rukinzo	2–1	1–1	0–2	0–3	1–0	1–0	2–2	1–1	2–1	3–3	1–0	0–0	1–2	2–3	—	1–3
Vital'O	0–0	2–0	1–1	1–5	1–0	1–1	3–2	3–2	0–2	2–0	0–0	1–1	2–1	3–0	1–2	—

Updated to match(es) played on 17 December 2022. Source: Soccerway
Legend: Blue = home team win; Yellow = draw; Red = away team win.

== Attendances ==
#	Football club	Average attendance
1	Musongati FC	4,984
2	Olympic Star	4,040
3	Bumamuru FC	2,920
4	Athletico New Oil	2,744
5	Flambeau du Centre	2,292
6	Vital'O FC	1,654
7	AS Inter Star	1,576
8	Kayanza United	1,364
9	Top Junior	1,292
10	Bujumbura City FC	1,112
11	Tigre Noir	1,050
12	Aigle Noir	1,043
13	Rukinzo FC	968
14	BS Dynamik	826
15	Le Messager	724
16	Magara Young Boys	440
