= 2019–20 Burundi Ligue A =

Burundi Ligue A
- Season: 2019–20
- Dates: 10 August 2019 – 24 June 2020
- Champions: Le Messager Ngozi
- Relegated: LLB Sport 4 Africa; Ngozi City; Les Lierres
- Champions League: Le Messager Ngozi
- Confederation Cup: Musongati
- Matches: 240
- Goals: 688 (2.87 per match)
- Biggest home win: Le Messager Ngozi 6–0 Les Lierres (7 September 2019); Olympic Star 6–0 LLB Sport 4 Africa (5 April 2020)
- Biggest away win: Kayanza United 0–5 Bujumbura City (26 September 2019); Les Lierres 1–6 Aigle Noir (23 June 2020)
- Highest scoring: Aigle Noir 6–2 Bujumbura City (20 June 2020)
- Longest winning run: 6 matches Le Messager Ngozi
- Longest unbeaten run: 14 matches Musongati
- Longest winless run: 9 matches Flambeau du Centre
- Longest losing run: 7 matches Ngozi City; Les Lierres

The 2019–20 Burundi Ligue A season, also known as Primus Ligue for sponsorship reasons, was the 57th edition of the Burundi Premier League, the top-tier football league in Burundi since its establishment in 1963. The season began on 10 August 2019 and was one of the few football leagues still playing during the COVID-19 pandemic, until it was suspended after the conclusion of matchday 27 on 5 April 2020. However, the season resumed on 30 May 2020 and the competition concluded on 24 June 2020.

== Teams ==
A total of sixteen clubs participate in this season. Thirteen teams from previous season and three new promoted sides.

Promoted from Ligue B

- BS Dynamik
- Top Junior
- Inter Star

Relegated from Ligue A

- Flambeau de l'Est
- Athlético Olympic
- Le Messager Bujumbura

Other changes

- Top Junior ceded the place in Ligue A to Athlético Olympic, which was renamed as Athlético Academy.

=== Stadiums and locations ===
Team	Location	Stadium	Capacity
Le Messager Ngozi	Ngozi	Stade Urukundo	5,000
Musongati	Gitega	Stade Ingoma	10,000
Aigle Noir Makamba	Makamba	Stade Peace Park	35,000
BS Dynamik	Bujumbura	Stade Intwari	10,000
Flambeau du Centre	Gitega	Stade Ingoma	10,000
Vital'O	Bujumbura	Stade Intwari	10,000
Bujumbura City	Bujumbura	Stade Intwari	10,000
Olympic Star Muyinga	Muyinga	Stade Municipal de Muyinga	10,000
Rukinzo	Bujumbura	Stade Intwari	10,000
Inter Star	Bujumbura	Stade Intwari	10,000
Bumamuru	Buganda	Stade Urunani	7,000
Kayanza United	Kayanza	Stade de Gatwaro	10,000
Athlético Academy	Bujumbura	Stade Intwari	10,000
LLB Sport 4 Africa	Bujumbura	Stade Intwari	10,000
Ngozi City	Ngozi	Stade Urukundo	5,000
Les Lierres	Bujumbura	Stade Intwari	10,000

== League table ==
Pos	Team	Pld	W	D	L	GF	GA	GD	Pts	Qualification or relegation
1	Le Messager Ngozi (C)	30	18	10	2	51	18	+33	64	Qualification for the Champions League
2	Musongati	30	15	11	4	45	26	+19	56	Qualification for the CAF Confederation Cup (Note: Musongati qualify for the CAF Confederation Cup as winners of the 2020 Coupe du Président de la République.)
3	Aigle Noir Makamba	30	13	9	8	56	39	+17	48 (Note: Head-to-head points: Aigle Noir 7, Dynamik 6, Flambeau du Centre 4.)	
4	BS Dynamik	30	13	9	8	32	25	+7	48	
5	Flambeau du Centre	30	13	9	8	44	40	+4	48	
6	Vital'O	30	12	8	10	41	33	+8	44	
7	Bujumbura City	30	12	7	11	47	41	+6	43	
8	Olympic Star Muyinga	30	11	6	13	54	48	+6	39 (Note: Head-to-head points: Olympic Star 6, Rukinzo 0.)	
9	Rukinzo	30	10	9	11	40	44	−4	39	
10	Inter Star	30	9	11	10	29	32	−3	38 (Note: Head-to-head points: Inter Star 4, Bumamuru 1.)	
11	Bumamuru	30	10	8	12	41	37	+4	38	
12	Kayanza United	30	9	10	11	35	39	−4	37	
13	Athlético Academy	30	9	9	12	46	44	+2	36	
14	LLB Sport 4 Africa (R)	30	9	8	13	23	41	−18	35	Relegation to Burundi Ligue B
15	Ngozi City (R)	30	6	4	20	28	62	−34	22	Relegation to Burundi Ligue B
16	Les Lierres (R)	30	6	2	22	26	69	−43	20	Relegation to Burundi Ligue B

Source: Soccerway
Rules for classification: 1) points; 2) head-to-head points; 3) head-to-head goal difference; 4) head-to-head goals scored; 5) head-to-head away goals scored; 6) goal difference; 7) goals scored;
(C) Champions; (R) Relegated

== Results ==
Home \ Away	AGN	ATO	BJC	BUM	DYN	FDC	ITS	KAY	LMN	LIE	LYD	MUS	NGO	OLS	RUK	VIT
Aigle Noir Makamba		1–1	6–2	1–3	3–1	5–2	1–1	2–1	0–2	1–2	3–0	1–1	2–2	1–1	2–1	1–1
Athlético Academy	1–5		0–1	3–2	1–2	2–1	0–2	3–2	1–2	2–0	0–0	1–2	4–0	3–3	5–1	2–0
Bujumbura City	1–2	3–2		3–3	1–1	0–0	0–0	2–1	1–2	2–0	1–2	2–3	5–2	1–1	1–0	0–1
Bumamuru	0–1	1–0	0–1		1–2	2–0	0–1	1–1	0–2	3–0	2–0	0–1	4–0	1–3	1–1	5–2
BS Dynamik	4–1	0–1	2–1	0–1		2–1	2–1	0–0	1–1	1–0	2–2	0–1	4–2	0–0	1–1	0–0
Flambeau du Centre	0–0	1–0	2–1	3–2	1–0		4–2	3–1	1–1	2–0	0–0	1–1	5–1	0–4	1–1	0–0
Inter Star	1–0	1–1	1–3	1–1	0–0	1–1		2–1	0–0	3–1	1–0	0–1	1–1	0–2	1–2	2–1
Kayanza United	2–1	1–1	0–5	0–1	0–1	1–1	2–1		2–0	2–1	2–0	1–1	1–0	3–0	0–2	1–1
Le Messager Ngozi	1–0	1–1	0–0	1–1	2–1	2–1	3–0	1–1		6–0	0–1	1–0	1–1	4–1	2–0	2–1
Les Lierres	1–6	1–3	1–0	0–3	2–1	1–2	1–1	1–2	0–2		1–2	1–2	2–1	2–1	1–4	1–3
LLB Sport 4 Africa	1–2	1–0	0–0	1–1	0–1	0–2	1–2	3–2	0–1	2–1		0–0	0–1	2–0	1–1	0–3
Musongati	2–1	3–3	2–3	0–0	0–0	4–1	0–0	0–0	1–1	3–1	4–0		3–1	0–2	2–0	2–0
Ngozi City	1–3	2–1	1–2	3–0	0–1	2–3	1–0	1–1	0–4	1–2	0–1	0–2		0–2	1–4	1–0
Olympic Star Muyinga	2–3	3–3	1–2	2–2	0–1	1–2	0–2	3–1	2–3	5–1	6–0	1–2	2–0		2–1	2–5
Rukinzo	1–1	1–1	3–2	2–0	1–0	0–3	1–0	1–1	0–3	2–0	1–1	2–2	1–0	1–2		2–3
Vital'O	0–0	1–0	2–1	2–0	0–1	3–0	1–1	0–2	0–0	1–1	1–2	2–0	1–2	2–0	4–2	

Source: Soccerway
Legend: Blue = home team win; Yellow = draw; Red = away team win.
