= 2024–25 Burundi Ligue A =

Burundi Ligue A
- Season: 2024–25
- Dates: 14 August 2024 – 7 May 2025
- Champions: Aigle Noir Makamba (2nd title)
- Relegated: Academie Deira; LLB Amasipiri; Moso Sugar Company
- Champions League: Aigle Noir Makamba
- Confederation Cup: Musongati
- Top goalscorer: (Burundi) Eddy Nibibona (20 goals)

The 2024–25 Burundi Ligue A season, also known as the Primus Ligue for sponsorship reasons, is the 62nd edition of the top flight football competition in Burundi. The season began on 14 August 2024 and is scheduled to conclude on 30 April 2025. Vital'O are the defending champions.

== Teams ==
=== Stadiums and locations ===
Team	Location	Stadium	Capacity
Académie Deira	Buganda	Stade Urunani	7,000
Aigle Noir Makamba	Makamba	Stade Peace Park	35,000
BS Dynamik	Bujumbura	Stade Intwari	10,000
Bumamuru	Buganda	Stade Urunani	7,000
Flambeau du Centre	Gitega	Stade Ingoma	10,000
Inter Star	Bujumbura	Stade Intwari	10,000
Kayanza United	Kayanza	Stade de Gatwaro	10,000
Le Messager Ngozi	Ngozi	Stade Urukundo	5,000
LLB Amasipiri	Makamba	Stade Peace Park Progress	23,000
Moso Sugar Company	Makamba	Stade Peace Park Progress	23,000
Musongati	Gitega	Stade Ingoma	10,000
Ngozi City	Mwumba	Stade Urukundo	5,000
Olympic Star Muyinga	Muyinga	Stade Umuco	10,000
Royal Vision 2026	Buganda	Stade Urunani	7,000
Rukinzo	Bujumbura	Stade Intwari	10,000
Vital'O	Bujumbura	Stade Intwari	10,000

== League table ==
Pos	Team	Pld	W	D	L	GF	GA	GD	Pts	Qualification or relegation
1	Aigle Noir Makamba (C, Q)	30	22	5	3	61	14	+47	71	Qualification for the CAF Champions League
2	Musongati (Q)	30	18	6	6	56	18	+38	60	Qualification for the CAF Confederation Cup
3	Bumamuru	30	16	10	4	48	23	+25	58	
4	Vital'O	30	15	10	5	54	26	+28	55	
5	Flambeau du Centre	30	15	10	5	52	25	+27	55	
6	Rukinzo	30	15	7	8	63	35	+28	52	
7	Olympic Star Muyinga	30	14	8	8	39	22	+17	50	
8	Inter Star	30	15	3	12	48	41	+7	48	
9	Le Messager Ngozi	30	12	10	8	31	27	+4	46	
10	Ngozi City	30	11	7	12	39	45	−6	40	
11	Royal Vision	30	8	8	14	41	57	−16	32	
12	Kayanza United	30	9	4	17	39	63	−24	31	
13	BS Dynamik	30	5	9	16	28	54	−26	24	
14	Academie Deira (R)	30	6	5	19	27	59	−32	23	Relegation to Burundi Ligue B
15	Moso Sugar Company (R)	30	4	1	25	22	82	−60	13	Relegation to Burundi Ligue B
16	LLB Amasipiri (R)	30	3	1	26	25	82	−57	10	Relegation to Burundi Ligue B

Source: Soccerway FFB
Rules for classification: 1) points; 2) head-to-head points; 3) head-to-head goal difference; 4) head-to-head goals scored; 5) head-to-head away goals scored; 6) goal difference; 7) goals scored;
(C) Champions; (Q) Qualified for the phase indicated; (R) Relegated

== Results ==
Home \ Away	ACA	AGN	DYN	BUM	FDC	INT	KAY	LMN	LLB	MSC	MUS	NGO	OLY	ROY	RUK	VIT
Academie Deira						0–4			1–2	2–1	0–2			5–0		0–3
Aigle Noir Makamba	2–0							0–1	3–0	7–0	2–0	3–1	1–0	2–0		
BS Dynamik	1–1	0–4		1–4		0–0	1–1	1–2						1–3		
Bumamuru	1–0	1–1				2–1	3–1			2–0	0–0		1–1	2–0		
Flambeau du Centre	1–1	1–0	3–1	1–0			1–1	1–0		2–1					0–0	
Inter Star					1–1				1–0		1–2	3–2	2–1		1–3	1–0
Kayanza United	3–0	0–2				3–0			3–2	3–0	0–3			3–1		
Le Messager Ngozi	3–1	0–0		2–2		1–0	1–0				0–0			1–0		
LLB Amasipiri				2–5	0–1			0–1		1–3		0–2			1–7	0–3
Moso Sugar Company			0–0			0–1		0–4			1–4		2–3		2–5	
Musongati			0–0		1–2				9–1			2–0	3–0		0–1	0–0
Ngozi City			2–1	2–2	2–1		2–1	3–0		0–1					1–1	0–0
Olympic Star Muyinga			0–0		1–0			2–0	1–2						3–1	1–0
Royal Vision			3–3		2–4	1–2			1–0			1–1	1–0			1–1
Rukinzo	6–0	2–1	3–2	0–2				1–2						0–0		
Vital'O		1–1	1–0	0–1	2–2		5–0	1–1		5–0						

Updated to match(es) played on 14 February 2025. Source: Soccerway
Legend: Blue = home team win; Yellow = draw; Red = away team win.
