= 2020–21 Burundi Ligue A =

Burundi Ligue A
- Season: 2020–21
- Dates: 5 September 2020 – 23 May 2021
- Champions: Le Messager Ngozi
- Relegated: Inter Star; Les Eléphants; Muzinga
- Champions League: Le Messager Ngozi
- Confederation Cup: Bumamuru
- Matches played: 240
- Goals scored: 584 (2.43 per match)

The 2020–21 Burundi Ligue A season, also known as the Primus Ligue for sponsorship reasons, was the 58th edition of the top flight football competition in Burundi. The season began on 5 September 2020 and ended on 23 May 2021.

== Teams ==
A total of sixteen clubs participate in this season. Thirteen teams from previous season and three new promoted sides.

Promoted from Ligue B

- Muzinga
- Royal de Muramvya
- Les Eléphants

Relegated from Ligue A

- LLB Sport 4 Africa
- Ngozi City
- Les Lierres

=== Stadiums and locations ===
Team	Location	Stadium	Capacity
Le Messager Ngozi	Ngozi	Stade Urukundo	5,000
Musongati	Gitega	Stade Ingoma	10,000
Aigle Noir Makamba	Makamba	Stade Peace Park	35,000
BS Dynamik	Bujumbura	Stade Intwari	10,000
Flambeau du Centre	Gitega	Stade Ingoma	10,000
Vital'O	Bujumbura	Stade Intwari	10,000
Bujumbura City	Bujumbura	Stade Intwari	10,000
Olympic Star Muyinga	Muyinga	Stade Municipal de Muyinga	10,000
Rukinzo	Bujumbura	Stade Intwari	10,000
Inter Star	Bujumbura	Stade Intwari	10,000
Bumamuru	Buganda	Stade Urunani	7,000
Kayanza United	Kayanza	Stade de Gatwaro	10,000
Athlético Academy	Bujumbura	Intwari Stadium	10,000
Les Eléphants	Bubanza	Stade Municipal de Bubanza	1,000
Muzinga	Bujumbura	Stade Intwari	10,000
Royal de Muramvya	Muramvya	Stade Municipal de Muramvya	2,000

== League table ==
Pos	Team	Pld	W	D	L	GF	GA	GD	Pts	Qualification or relegation
1	Le Messager Ngozi (C)	30	15	10	5	42	26	+16	55	Qualification for the CAF Champions League
2	Kayanza United	30	16	7	7	50	35	+15	55	
3	Flambeau du Centre	30	16	6	8	43	26	+17	54	
4	Aigle Noir Makamba	30	15	8	7	49	33	+16	53	
5	Musongati	30	14	8	8	48	30	+18	50	
6	Rukinzo	30	14	8	8	41	35	+6	50	
7	Vital'O	30	13	5	12	34	33	+1	44	
8	Olympic Star Muyinga	30	12	6	12	35	30	+5	42	
9	Royal de Muramvya	30	11	9	10	36	32	+4	42	
10	BS Dynamik	30	12	5	13	24	27	−3	41	
11	Bumamuru	30	11	6	13	33	39	−6	39	Qualification for the CAF Confederation Cup (Note: Bumamuru qualify for the CAF Confederation Cup as winners of the 2021 Coupe du Président de la République.)
12	Athlético Academy	30	10	7	13	35	42	−7	37	
13	Bujumbura City	30	10	6	14	38	45	−7	36	
14	Inter Star (R)	30	9	4	17	31	42	−11	31	Relegation to Burundi Ligue B
15	Les Eléphants (R)	30	6	7	17	30	58	−28	25	Relegation to Burundi Ligue B
16	Muzinga (R)	30	2	6	22	15	51	−36	12	Relegation to Burundi Ligue B

Source: Soccerway
Rules for classification: 1) points; 2) head-to-head points; 3) head-to-head goal difference; 4) head-to-head goals scored; 5) head-to-head away goals scored; 6) goal difference; 7) goals scored;
(C) Champions; (R) Relegated
