= 2021–22 Burundi Ligue A =

Burundi Ligue A
- Season: 2021–22
- Dates: 14 August 2021 – 14 May 2022
- Champions: Flambeau du Centre
- Relegated: Les Crocos; Flambeau de l'Est; Royal de Muramvya
- Champions League: Flambeau du Centre
- Confederation Cup: Bumamuru
- Matches played: 240
- Goals scored: 499 (2.08 per match)
- Highest attendance: 5,000 Le Messager Ngozi vs Musongati FC

The 2021–22 Burundi Ligue A season, also known as the Primus Ligue for sponsorship reasons, was the 59th edition of the top flight football competition in Burundi. The season began on 14 August 2021 and ended on 14 May 2022. Le Messager Ngozi were the defending champion.

Flambeau du Centre won their first league title following 2-1 win against Athlético New Oil on the last day of the season.

== Teams ==
A total of sixteen clubs participate in this season. Thirteen teams from previous season and three new promoted sides.

Promoted from Ligue B

- Top Junior
- Flambeau de l'Est
- Les Crocos

Relegated from Ligue A

- Inter Star
- Les Eléphants
- Muzinga

Other changes

- Athlético Academy merged with Ligue B side New Oil FC to form Athlético New Oil.

=== Stadiums and locations ===
Team	Location	Stadium	Capacity
Le Messager Ngozi	Ngozi	Stade Urukundo	5,000
Musongati	Gitega	Stade Ingoma	10,000
Aigle Noir Makamba	Makamba	Stade Peace Park	35,000
BS Dynamik	Bujumbura	Stade Intwari	10,000
Flambeau du Centre	Gitega	Stade Ingoma	10,000
Vital'O	Bujumbura	Stade Intwari	10,000
Bujumbura City	Bujumbura	Stade Intwari	10,000
Olympic Star Muyinga	Muyinga	Stade Umuco	10,000
Rukinzo	Bujumbura	Stade Intwari	10,000
Flambeau de l'Est	Ruyigi	Stade de Ruyigi	2,000
Bumamuru	Buganda	Stade Urunani	7,000
Kayanza United	Kayanza	Stade de Gatwaro	10,000
Athlético New Oil	Muyinga	Stade Umuco	10,000
Top Junior	Kayanza	Stade de Gatwaro	10,000
Les Crocos	Rumonge	Stade Onmisports Ivyizigiro	5,418
Royal de Muramvya	Muramvya	Stade Municipal de Muramvya	2,000

== League table ==
Pos	Team	Pld	W	D	L	GF	GA	GD	Pts	Qualification or relegation
1	Flambeau du Centre (C)	30	16	5	9	40	24	+16	53	Qualification for the CAF Champions League
2	Athlético New Oil	30	15	7	8	35	22	+13	52	
3	Bumamuru	30	15	6	9	40	27	+13	51	Qualification for the CAF Confederation Cup (Note: Bumamuru qualify for the CAF Confederation Cup as winners of the 2022 Coupe du Président de la République.)
4	Top Junior	30	14	9	7	37	29	+8	51	
5	Aigle Noir Makamba	30	12	10	8	39	31	+8	46	
6	Olympic Star Muyinga	30	11	13	6	31	25	+6	46	
7	Le Messager Ngozi	30	13	7	10	27	21	+6	46	
8	BS Dynamik	30	13	7	10	35	33	+2	46	
9	Musongati	30	12	8	10	27	22	+5	44	
10	Rukinzo	30	8	15	7	26	25	+1	39	
11	Vital'O	30	11	6	13	32	39	−7	39	
12	Bujumbura City	30	9	10	11	35	37	−2	37	
13	Kayanza United	30	8	9	13	34	38	−4	33	
14	Les Crocos (R)	30	5	9	16	19	29	−10	24	Relegation to Burundi Ligue B
15	Flambeau de l'Est (R)	30	5	8	17	18	54	−36	23	Relegation to Burundi Ligue B
16	Royal de Muramvya (R)	30	5	7	18	24	43	−19	22	Relegation to Burundi Ligue B

Source: Soccerway
Rules for classification: 1) points; 2) head-to-head points; 3) head-to-head goal difference; 4) head-to-head goals scored; 5) head-to-head away goals scored; 6) goal difference; 7) goals scored;
(C) Champions; (R) Relegated
