= Burundi national under-20 football team =

National under-20 association football team representing Burundi

Burundi Under-20
- Association: Football Federation of Burundi
- Confederation: CAF (Africa)
- Head coach: Joslin Bipfubusa
- FIFA code: BDI

First international
- Burundi2–1 Mauritius (31 January 1995)

Biggest win
- Djibouti 0–5 Burundi (Omdurman, Sudan; 25 October 2022)

Biggest defeat
- Chad 5–0 Burundi (18 April 2010)

FIFA U-20 World Cup
- Appearances: 1 (first in 1995)
- Best result: Group Stage (1995)

The Burundi national under-20 football team, also known as Burundi Under-20s or Burundi U20(s), represents Burundi in association football at an under-20 age level and is controlled by the Football Federation of Burundi, the governing body for football in Burundi.

== Honours ==
- CECAFA U-20 Championship:
  - Runners-up (2): 2005, 2006

== Players ==
=== Current squad ===
- The following players were called up for the 2022 CECAFA U-20 Championship.
- Match dates: 28 October – 11 November 2022
- Caps and goals correct as of: 24 October 2022

No.	Pos.	Player	Date of birth (age)	Caps	Goals	Club
	GK	Papy Habula	Unknown	0	0	(Football Federation of Burundi) Aigle Noir
	GK	Jean Marie Harerimana	Unknown	0	0	Unknown
	DF	Vincent Barungitse	1 January 2004 (age 22)	0	0	(Football Federation of Burundi) Le Messager Ngozi
	DF	Jean Claude Girumugisha	18 September 1999 (age 27)	0	0	(Football Federation of Burundi) Magara Young Boys
	DF	Allidou Hakizamana	31 May 2002 (age 24)	0	0	(Football Federation of Burundi) Musongati
	DF	Ulimwengu Hakizamana	15 November 2000 (age 25)	0	0	(Football Federation of Burundi) Tigre Noir
	DF	Kevin Icoyitungiye	5 May 2003 (age 23)	0	0	(Football Federation of Burundi) Tigre Noir
	DF	Giggs Ishimwe	4 April 1998 (age 28)	0	0	(Football Federation of Burundi) Bujumbura City
	DF	Prince Musore	Unknown	0	0	Unknown
	DF	Jean Nahimana	Unknown	0	0	Unknown
	DF	Mechack Ndayishimiye	1 January 2001 (age 25)	0	0	(Football Federation of Burundi) Kayanza United
	DF	Baros Tambwe	26 January 2002 (age 24)	0	0	(Football Federation of Burundi) Musongati
	MF	Richard Ndayishimiye	1 January 2004 (age 22)	0	0	(Football Federation of Burundi) Sports Dynamik
	MF	Kessy Jordan Nimubona	Unknown	0	0	Unknown
	MF	Alfred Nkurunziza	1 January 2004 (age 22)	0	0	(Football Federation of Burundi) Bumamuru
	FW	Keita Bukuru	19 September 2000 (age 26)	0	0	(Football Federation of Burundi) Tigre Noir
	FW	Placide Hitimana	18 July 2002 (age 24)	0	0	(Football Federation of Burundi) Kayanza United
	FW	Abdi Ineza	10 December 2003 (age 22)	0	0	(Football Federation of Burundi) Tigre Noir
	FW	Abdoul Mpawenimana	22 October 2002 (age 23)	0	0	(Football Federation of Burundi) Rukinzo
	FW	Akbar Muderi	1 January 2002 (age 24)	0	0	(Football Federation of Burundi) Le Messager Ngozi
	FW	Arthur Nibikora	20 April 2003 (age 23)	1	3	(Football Federation of Burundi) Le Messager Ngozi

== Tournament history ==
=== FIFA U-20 World Cup ===
Year	Round	GP	W	D*	L	GS	GA	GD
(Tunisia) 1977	Did not qualify	-	-	-	-	-	-	
(Japan) 1979	Did not qualify	-	-	-	-	-	-	
(Australia) 1981	Did not qualify	-	-	-	-	-	-	-
(Mexico) 1983	Did not qualify	-	-	-	-	-	-	
(Soviet Union) 1985	Did not qualify	-	-	-	-	-	-	
(Chile) 1987	Did not qualify	-	-	-	-	-	-	
(Saudi Arabia) 1989	Did not qualify	-	-	-	-	-	-	
(Portugal) 1991	Did not qualify	-	-	-	-	-	-	
(Australia) 1993	Did not qualify	-	-	-	-	-	-	-
(Qatar) 1995	Group Stage	3	0	1	2	2	8	–6
(Malaysia) 1997	Did not qualify	-	-	-	-	-	-	-
(Nigeria) 1999	Did not qualify	-	-	-	-	-	-	-
(Argentina) 2001	Did not qualify	-	-	-	-	-	-	-
(United Arab Emirates) 2003	Did not qualify	-	-	-	-	-	-	
(Netherlands) 2005	Did not qualify	-	-	-	-	-	-	
(Canada) 2007	Did not qualify	-	-	-	-	-	-	
(Egypt) 2009	Did not qualify	-	-	-	-	-	-	-
(Colombia) 2011	Did not qualify	-	-	-	-	-	-	-
(Turkey) 2013	Did not qualify	-	-	-	-	-	-	-
(New Zealand) 2015	Did not qualify	-	-	-	-	-	-	-
(South Korea) 2017	Did not qualify	-	-	-	-	-	-	-
(Poland) 2019	Did not qualify	-	-	-	-	-	-	-
(Argentina) 2023	Did not qualify	-	-	-	-	-	-	-
(Chile) 2025	Did not qualify	-	-	-	-	-	-	-
(Azerbaijan) (Uzbekistan) 2027	To be determined	-	-	-	-	-	-	-
(Armenia) (Georgia (country)) 2029	To be determined	-	-	-	-	-	-	-
Total	1/26	3	0	1	2	2	8	–6

== Head-to-head record ==
The following table shows Burundi's head-to-head record in the FIFA U-20 World Cup.

Opponent	Pld	W	D	L	GF	GA	GD	Win %
Chile	1	0	1	0	1	1	+0	0.00
Japan	1	0	0	1	0	2	−2	0.00
Spain	1	0	0	1	1	5	−4	0.00
Total	3	0	1	2	2	8	−6	0.00
