= Mabano Shabani Muryango =

Burundian footballer

Personal information
- Full name: Mabano Shabani Muryango
- Date of birth: 15 December 1999 (age 26)
- Place of birth: Bujumbura, Burundi
- Height: 1.90 m (6 ft 3 in)
- Position: Midfielder

Team information
- Current team: AS Port
- Number: 5

Youth career
- Aigle Noir

Senior career*
Years	Team	Apps	(Gls)
2015–2016	AS Inter Star	5	
2016–2020	Aigle Noir	100	(12)
2019–2020	US Tataouine		
2020–2021	Kayanza United	33	(14)
2021–2022	Atletico Olympic FC	27	(2)
2022–2023	Polisi Tanzania	10	
2022–2023	Bumamuru FC	12	
2023-2024	AS Port	18	(8)

International career^{‡}
2018–	Burundi		
- * Club domestic league appearances and goals as of 6:14, 21 August 2024 (UTC) ‡ National team caps and goals as of 21 August 2024

Mabano Shabani (born 15 December 1999) is a Burundian soccer player, who normally plays as a midfielder. He began his international career in 2018, representing Burundi's national team, the Intamba Murugamba (the Swallows), across the under-20, under-23, and senior levels. His ability to control the pace of the game and his keen vision quickly established him as a key player for the Burundi national team.

== Career ==
=== Club ===
At the club level, Mabano's journey began with Aigle Noir, and he eventually secured to Union Sportive de Tataouine in Tunisia. His career continued with stints at Kayanza United, Atletico New Oil, and finally, Bumamuru, where he played a role in securing the Primus League championship in the 2022–2023 season.

In the 2020–2021 season, MABANO was the third top scorer in the Burundian Championship, with an impressive tally of 14 goals.

=== International career ===
In the 2023–2024 season, Mabano brought his talents to Djibouti's Division 1, where he made a significant impact, scoring 8 goals in 18 matches. Additionally, in the Djibouti Cup, he scored 4 goals in just 5 matches. He is currently a free agent.
