= Bienvenue Shaka =

Burundian footballer

Personal information
- Full name: Bienvenue Shaka
- Date of birth: 29 December 1999 (age 26)
- Place of birth: Burundi
- Height: 5 ft 6 in (1.68 m)
- Position: Forward

Team information
- Current team: Flambeau du Centre
- Number: 13

Youth career
- Aigle Noir

Senior career*
Years	Team	Apps	(Gls)
2017–2018	Aigle Noir		(29)
2018–2019	ES Sahel	5	(1)
2019–2020	US Tataouine	4	(0)
2020–2021	AFC Leopards	4	(4)
2021	MC Oran	0	(0)
2022–2023	Aigle Noir	1	(1)
2023–2025	Flambeau du Centre	6	(8)

International career^{‡}
2018	Burundi U20		
- * Club domestic league appearances and goals as of 25 August 2025 ‡ National team caps and goals as of 11 January 2019

Bienvenue Shaka (born 29 December 1999) is a Burundian professional footballer who last played as a forward for Flambeau du Centre.
