= Académie Le Messager FC Gitega =

Flambeau du Centre
- Full name: Flambeau du Centre Football Club
- Nickname: Académie le Message de Gitega
- Founded: 2016; 10 years ago
- Ground: Stade Municipal de Muyinga
- Capacity: 10,000
- Manager: Momcilo Medic
- League: Burundi Ligue A
- 2020–21: Ligue A, 1st of 16
- Website: https://www.owsports.info/sites/primusleague/teams/241381
Home colours	Away colours

Flameau du Centre is a professional football club based in Gitega, Burundi. The team currently plays in the Burundi Ligue A, the top division of Burundi football.

== History ==
The club comes from the Le Messager FC academy, like the Le Messager Football Club Ngozi, it evolved at the beginning under the name Académie Le Messager FC Gitega before taking the name of Flambeau du Center. The Messenger Gitega was able to access the 2nd national division after three years of negotiations for name change reasons. The leaders of the federation could not accept two teams with the same name of Messenger .

Since the 2017–2018 season, the club has played in the first division of Burundi. In 2022 the club won its first league title.

== Honors ==
National competitions

- Burundi Premier League::2021-22
- Burundi Cup: Finalist: 2021, 2022

== Current Team ==
As of 22 October 2022

Note: Flags indicate national team as defined under FIFA eligibility rules; some limited exceptions apply. Players may hold more than one non-FIFA nationality.

No.	Pos.	Nation	Player
17	GK	BDI	Abdoul Karim Barandondera
2	GK	BDI	Abdourahmani Rukundo
8	GK	BDI	Amissi Asmani
14	DF	BDI	Beni Irakoze
11	DF	BDI	Benjamin Rukundo
1	DF	BDI	Dieudonne Ntibahezwa
18	DF	BDI	Eddy Patrick Ntwari
5	DF	BDI	Enock Tumebarikiwa
19	DF	BDI	Gakiza Aime Nyandwi
7	DF	BDI	Gilbert Tuyihimbaze

No.	Pos.	Nation	Player
27	MF	BDI	Guy Kavumbagu Nahimana
15	MF	BDI	Henry Msanga
4	MF	BDI	Issa Hakizimana
16	MF	BDI	Juma Nijimbere
10	MF	BDI	Karim Niyonkuru
6	MF	BDI	Leonard Gakwaya
25	MF	BDI	Moussa Muryango
3	FW	BDI	Olivier Dushime
21	FW	BDI	Patrick Kwizera
20	FW	BDI	Sadiki Yahya

== Management and staff ==
Management and staff as of 12 August 2022
Position	Name
Head coach	(Serbia) Momcilo Medic
Assistant coach	(Burundi) Jean de Dieu Rukundo
Manager	(Burundi) Sosthene Tuyikunde
Team Doctor	(Burundi) Gordien Nduwimana
Goalkeeper Coach	(Burundi) Jean Claude Manirakiza
Kit Manager	(Burundi) Emery Niyonkuru
Physiotherapist	(Burundi) Celestin Ngenzebuhoro
