= 2018–19 Burundi Ligue A =

Burundi Ligue A
- Season: 2018–19
- Dates: 17 August 2018 – 27 April 2019
- Champions: Aigle Noir Makamba
- Relegated: Flambeau de l'Est; Athlético Olympique; Le Messager Bujumbura
- Champions League: Aigle Noir Makamba
- Confederation Cup: Rukinzo
- Matches played: 240
- Goals scored: 560 (2.33 per match)

The 2018–19 Burundi Ligue A season, also known as Primus Ligue for sponsorship reasons, was the 56th edition of the top flight football competition in Burundi. The season began on 17 August 2018 and ended on 27 April 2019.

== Teams ==
A total of sixteen clubs participate in this season. Thirteen teams from previous season and three new promoted sides.

Promoted from Ligue B

- Bumamuru
- Rukinzo
- Kayanza United

Relegated from Ligue A

- Inter Star
- Les Jeunes Athlétiques
- Delta Star Gatumba

== League table ==
Pos	Team	Pld	W	D	L	GF	GA	GD	Pts	Qualification or relegation
1	Aigle Noir Makamba (C)	30	21	5	4	72	26	+46	68	Qualification for the CAF Champions League
2	Musongati	30	16	7	7	54	32	+22	55	
3	Vital'O	30	16	5	9	32	20	+12	53	
4	Le Messager Ngozi	30	13	10	7	40	29	+11	49	
5	Bumamuru	30	13	5	12	32	33	−1	44	
6	Rukinzo	30	12	5	13	33	28	+5	41	Qualification for the CAF Confederation Cup (Note: Rukinzo qualify for the CAF Confederation Cup as a runners-up of the 2019 Coupe du Président de la République.)
7	Bujumbura City	30	11	8	11	35	34	+1	41	
8	Ngozi City	30	10	7	13	24	40	−16	37	
9	Flambeau du Centre	30	9	10	11	39	40	−1	37	
10	Olympic Star Muyinga	30	9	10	11	37	48	−11	37	
11	Les Lierres	30	8	12	10	30	38	−8	36	
12	Kayanza United	30	8	10	12	28	34	−6	34	
13	LLB Sport 4 Africa	30	8	9	13	27	37	−10	33	
14	Flambeau de l'Est (R)	30	7	12	11	20	27	−7	33	Relegation to Burundi Ligue B
15	Athlético Olympique (R)	30	9	6	15	28	38	−10	33	Relegation to Burundi Ligue B
16	Le Messager Bujumbura (R)	30	7	5	18	29	56	−27	26	Relegation to Burundi Ligue B

Source: Soccerway
Rules for classification: 1) points; 2) head-to-head points; 3) head-to-head goal difference; 4) head-to-head goals scored; 5) head-to-head away goals scored; 6) goal difference; 7) goals scored;
(C) Champions; (R) Relegated
