= Joslin Bipfubusa =

Burundian football manager

Personal information
- Full name: Joslin Sharif Bipfubusa
- Date of birth: 10 October 1984 (age 42)

Managerial career
- Years: Team
- Aigle Noir
- Burundi U20
- 2020: Burundi

Joslin Sharif Bipfubusa (born 10 October 1984) is a Burundian football coach currently manager of Burundi.

== Managerial career ==
Bipfubusa managed Burundi during the 2020 Bangabandhu Cup, following spells managing Aigle Noir and the Burundi under-20 team.
