= Aigle Noir =

Aigle Noir ("Black Eagle") may refer to:

- Aigle Noir Makamba FC, Burundian football club
- Aigle Noir AC, Haitian football club
