= Impact of the COVID-19 pandemic on football =

Impact of the COVID-19 pandemic on football may refer to:

- Impact of the COVID-19 pandemic on association football
- Impact of the COVID-19 pandemic on gridiron football
