= Impact of the COVID-19 pandemic on association football =

The COVID-19 pandemic caused disruption to association football (also known as soccer) across the world, mirroring its impact across all sports. Across the world to varying degrees, leagues and competitions had been cancelled or postponed.

== Club football ==
By 25 May 2020, the Turkmenistan Ýokary Liga, the Belarusian Premier League and the Liga Primera de Nicaragua were the only three known top flight national football leagues not suspended due to the pandemic.

=== Africa ===
Both the CAF Champions League and CAF Confederation Cup semi-finals were postponed from their original schedules, to be resumed in October 2020.

Burundi Ligue A was one of the few football leagues still playing during the COVID-19 pandemic, until it was suspended after the conclusion of matchday 27 on 5 April 2020. However, the season resumed on 30 May 2020 and the competition concluded on 24 June 2020.

=== Asia ===
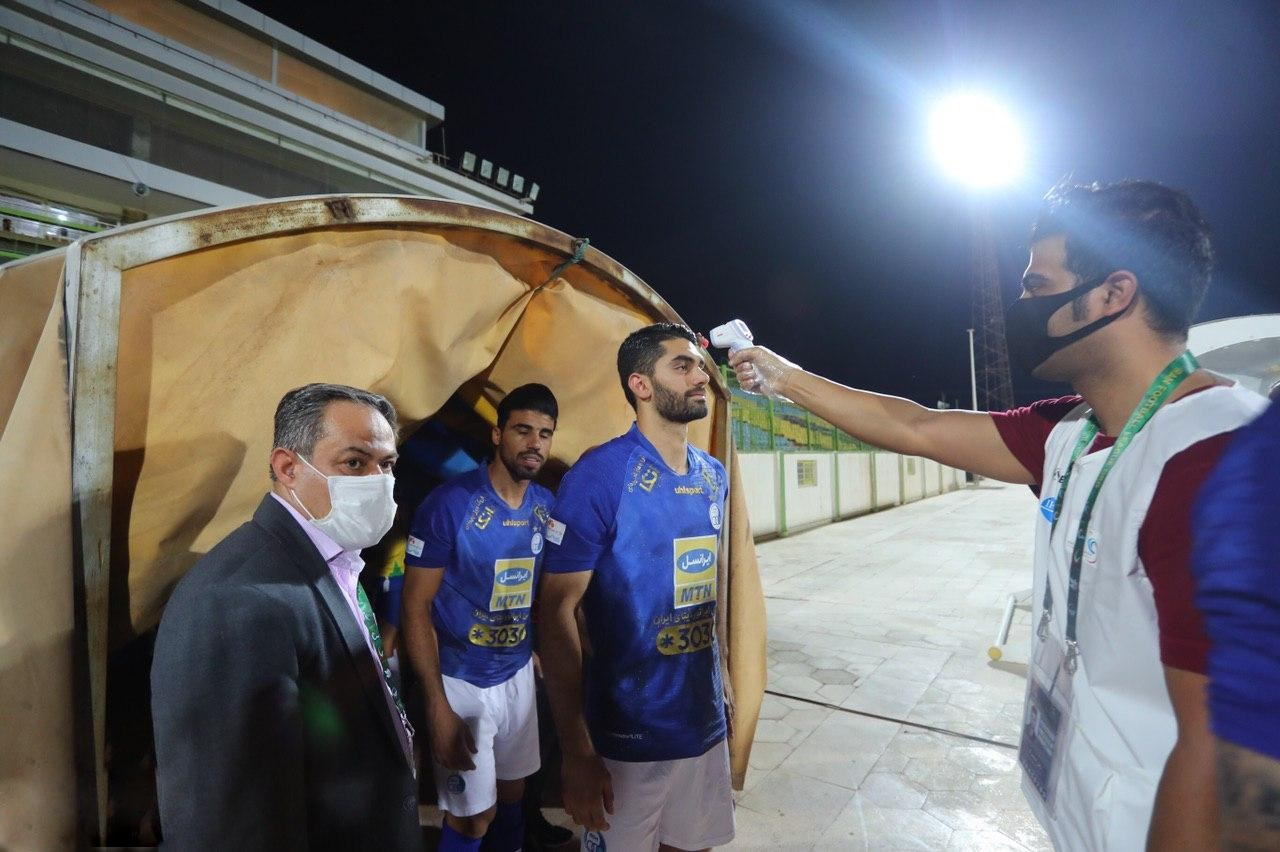
Players in the Persian Gulf Pro League having their body temperature measured

In China, the 2020 Chinese Super League was postponed as a result of the pandemic. In Hong Kong, the 2020 Lunar New Year Cup was cancelled on 23 January 2020, 2021 Lunar New Year Cup was cancelled on 2 February 2021 and 2022 Lunar New Year Cup was cancelled on 7 January 2022. Other leagues in Asia were affected, including South Korea's K League 1 and Japan's J1 League. The K League of South Korea announced that the K League 1 would return on 8 May, changing the original scheduling start of 29 February.

On 16 March 2020, the Football Federation Australia due to restrictions imposed by the Australian Government of gatherings involving more than 500 people, announced that the remainder of the season of the A-League would proceed with all games being played behind closed doors. The season was suspended on 24 March.

The AFC Champions League and AFC Cup were also impacted, with a number of group stage and play-off matches being postponed.

Ýokary Liga of Turkmenistan was one of the few football leagues still playing during the COVID-19 pandemic, until it was suspended on 23 March 2020. It resumed on 19 April with spectators. However, on 17 August 2020, the competition was suspended again. The league resumed later.

On 27 March, the Tajikistan Football Federation announced that the Tajik Super Cup and the opening of the Tajikistan Higher League would be played behind closed doors due to the threat of the COVID-19 pandemic. However, on 25 April, the Tajikistan Football Federation announced the suspension of football, following the completion of Round 4 on 26 April, until 10 May. On 6 May, the Tajikistan Football Federation extended the suspension of football indefinitely due to the spread of COVID-19 pandemic in Tajikistan.

On 12 April 2020 Taiwan Football Premier League began. It was one of the few football leagues in the world to begin and proceed without disruption, due to the relatively light situation in Taiwan compared to most other countries. Due to the COVID-19 pandemic in Taiwan, no fans were allowed to attend the first round of the competition.

In India, the remaining I-League matches were postponed and the Indian Super League final was played behind closed doors.

Owing to the surge in new COVID-19 cases, the Beijing Municipal Sports Competitions Administration Centre announced on 15 June 2020 the suspension of the 2020 CSL season. On 1 July, it was announced that the season would start on 25 July.

On 9 July, it was announced that the AFC Cup would return on 23 September and conclude on 12 December, with the group stage matches to be held in centralised venues. However, the season was later abandoned on 10 September and was declared void the following day.

In the AFC Champions League, the AFC announced that Qatar would host all West Region matches after restart. Al Wahda were unable to travel to Qatar to play their remaining matches of the group stage due to several team members testing positive for COVID-19. They were considered to have withdrawn from the competition, and all their previous matches were considered "null and void". The same happened with the defending champion Al-Hilal, when they failed to name the required 13 players and were unable to play their final match of the group stage against Shabab Al-Ahli due to them having only 11 players left with the remaining team members testing positive for COVID-19; hence, they were also considered to have withdrawn from the competition, and all their previous matches were considered "null and void", and would not be taken into consideration in determining the final group rankings.

Qatar also hosted all AFC Champions League East Region matches after restart. However, Malaysian club Johor Darul Ta'zim were unable to travel to Qatar to play the final four matches of the group stage due to the COVID-19 pandemic travel restrictions after they were denied permission to travel by the Malaysian government. Their matches were considered "null and void" and would not affect the final group rankings.

On 25 January 2021, AFC announced the cancellation of the 2020 AFC U-16 Championship following two postponements due to the COVID-19 pandemic, leaving the hosting rights for the next tournament with Bahrain.

In the 2021 AFC Champions League, the three teams from Australia, Sydney FC, Melbourne City and Brisbane Roar, withdrew from the competition after the draw. Moreover, Chinese teams, Guangzhou, Beijing Guoan and Shanghai Port, opted to participate with a mixture of their youth and reserve teams.

=== Europe ===
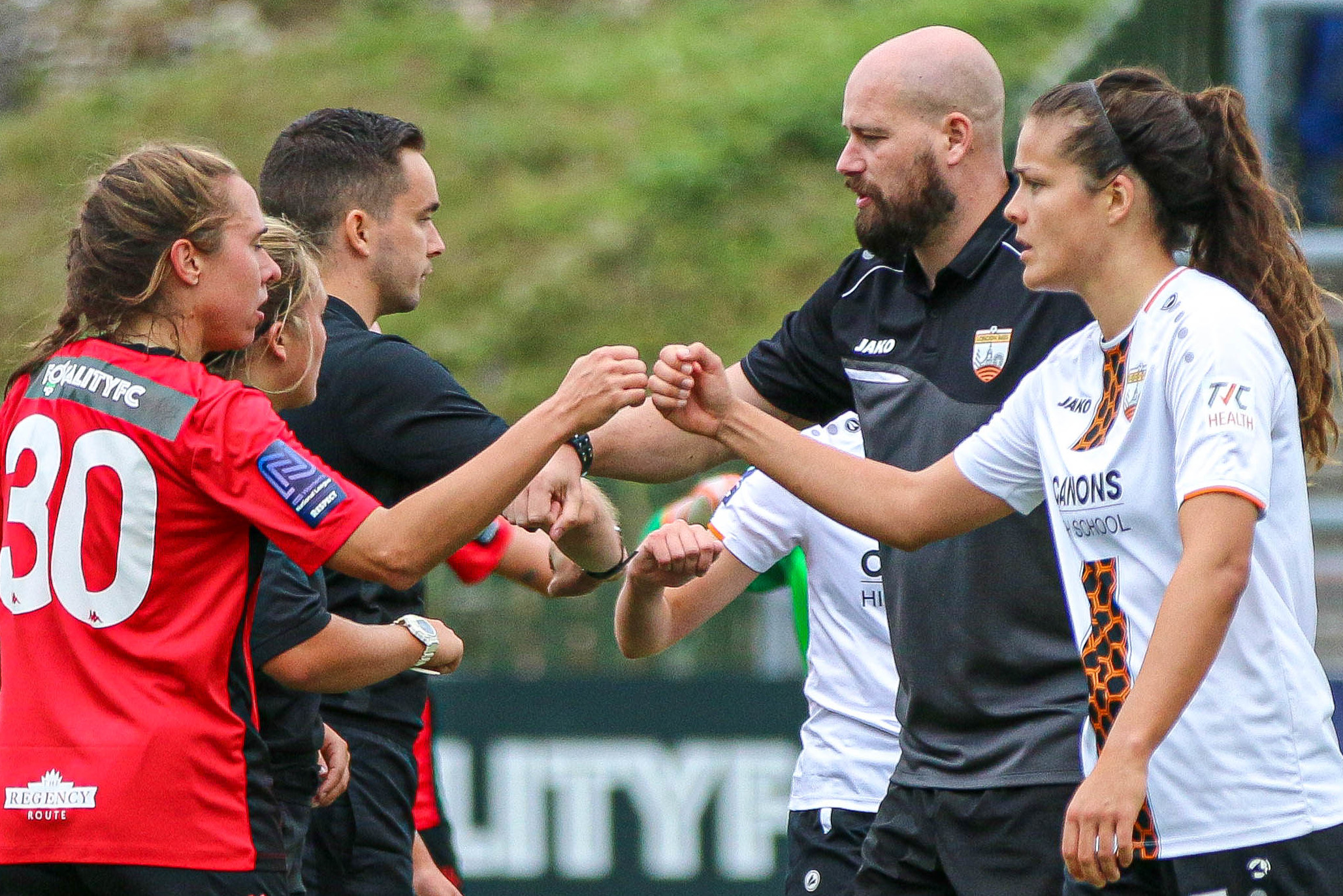
Post-match handshakes replaced by fist and elbow bumps (August 2020)

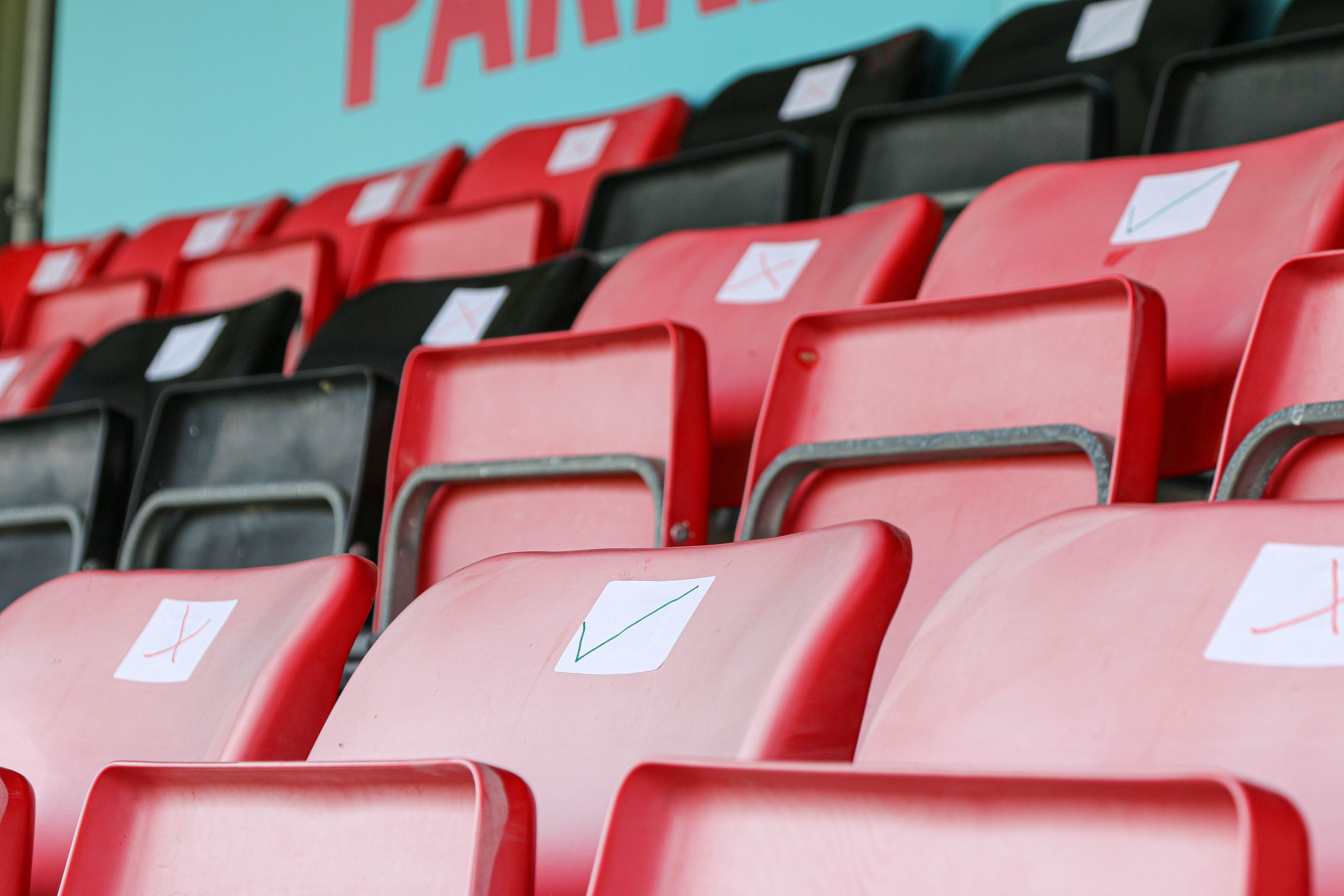
Seats at the Dripping Pan marked for social distancing

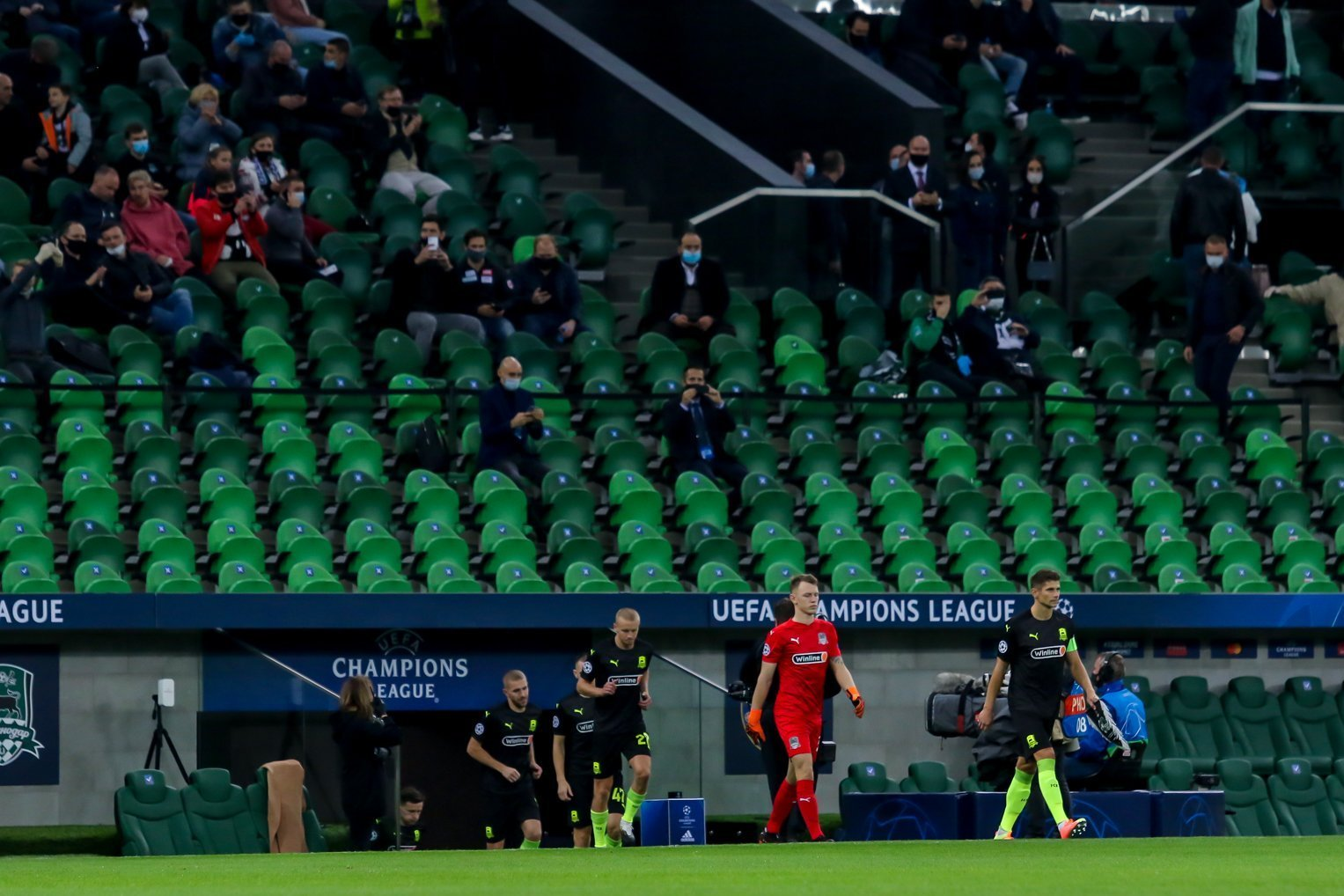
A UEFA Champions League match between FC Krasnodar and Chelsea played in front of a limited-capacity crowd (October 2020)

In Europe, various knockout matches in the Champions League and Europa League were played behind closed doors in February and March 2020. On 12 March 2020, UEFA announced that the elite qualification round of the men and women's under-17 and under-19 youth international tournaments had been postponed. The following day, UEFA postponed all fixtures for the following week in the Champions League, Europa League and Youth League. On 17 June UEFA announced that the Champions League would resume in Portugal, and the Europa League in Germany, in August, but all rounds would be single-match affairs, with the exception of the Europa League round of 16 where the first game had already been played.

Many of the domestic European leagues were impacted in February and March 2020. After various fixtures were rescheduled or played behind closed doors, Serie A was postponed on 9 March 2020. On 12 March, La Liga and the Segunda División were suspended for at least two weeks after a Real Madrid basketball player tested positive for the virus, which resulted in Real Madrid's footballers being put in quarantine as the two teams share the same training facilities in Valdebebas. The Eredivisie was also suspended (it was officially declared abandoned on 24 April with no champion awarded), while Ligue 1 and the Bundesliga followed suit shortly afterwards. Ligue 1 would eventually end on 27 April after the French Prime Minister ordered all sporting events to be cancelled until 1 September, with Paris Saint-Germain being declared champions and on 23 June Amiens and Toulouse were relegated to the 2020–21 Ligue 2. The Bundesliga eventually returned on 16 May following the suspension of play.

On 10 March, the Premier League match between Manchester City and Arsenal, due to be played the next day, was postponed after a number of Arsenal players made close contact with Olympiacos owner Evangelos Marinakis, who had tested positive for coronavirus, when the two teams had met in the Europa League 13 days earlier. Arsenal manager Mikel Arteta tested positive for the disease, prompting the team's Premier League match against Brighton & Hove Albion for that weekend to also be postponed. As of 13 March, there has been at least one recorded case of the disease affecting a player in the aforementioned leagues; Serie A footballers Daniele Rugani and Manolo Gabbiadini, 2. Bundesliga footballer Timo Hübers, and Premier League footballer Callum Hudson-Odoi. Rugani tested positive while being asymptomatic. On 13 March, English elite football was suspended until early April, including the Premier League, English Football League, FA Women's Super League and FA Women's Championship.

On 17 March, the Russian Premier League was suspended.

By 19 March 2020, the Belarusian Premier League was the only active top flight in all 55 UEFA member associations. Only a few matches were postponed due to outbreaks of the disease in some teams and only one was cancelled due to the lack of influence of the result in November 2020.

On 5 May 2020, Scottish Professional Football League (SPFL) chief executive Neil Doncaster summed up the situation in his country during a video conference involving the Scottish Football Association, Scottish Rugby and others in respect of the COVID-19 pandemic; he stated that "gate receipts make up a far higher proportion of our income than in England, which benefits from huge TV deals, so until we get back to playing in front of crowds, our game will remain in grave peril."

On 16 May 2020 the Bundesliga became the first major European league to return with matches played behind closed doors. In the subsequent weeks, other leagues followed suit. The Nemzeti Bajnokság I and the Czech First League resumed on 23 May; the Ekstraklasa and Serbian SuperLiga resumed on 29 May 2020; The Primeira Liga returned on 3 June; La Liga on 11 June; the Premier League on 17 June; and Serie A on 20 June.

On 2 June 2020, the Russian Premier League published specific dates for each remaining game of the season, with the first game upon resumption scheduled on 19 June. On 5 June, the league announced that some fans would be allowed in the stands, following limitations established by the appropriate local authorities, but away fans would not be allowed in.

That same day chairman of Premier League football side Tottenham Hotspur, Daniel Levy, revealed that the club has taken a loan of £175 million from the Bank of England. The chairman said that money has been taken to tackle with the gripping effects of coronavirus pandemic on the club.

On 30 June 2020, Premier League chief executive Richard Masters announced £1,000,000 as aid for next seasons of the Women's Super League and Championship to mitigate the effect of coronavirus.

On 19 June 2020, FC Rostov lost 1–10 against PFC Sochi in the Russian Premier League, as they fielded their junior team, after six players of the senior team have been infected with COVID-19; hence, the whole team was quarantined.

The Spanish Copa del Rey final was originally scheduled for 18 April 2020 in Estadio de La Cartuja, but the match was postponed with the agreement of both participating clubs (Athletic Bilbao and Real Sociedad) on 11 March (with no new date decided at that point), in the hope that the delay would provide time to contain the outbreak and allow the final to take place with a full stadium as in normal circumstances. Despite this, the final was played on 3 April 2021 behind closed doors.

On 1 July 2020, Wigan Athletic fell into administration after being negatively affected by the pandemic lockdown. By appointing Paul Stanley, Gerald Krasner and Dean Watson from Begbies Traynor, it became the first professional club in England to call up administrators since the pandemic had begun. In addition, many small English football clubs were affected by the pandemic as they rely on ticket sales for revenue.

On 4 July 2020, the DFB-Pokal final was played behind doors between Bayer 04 Leverkusen and FC Bayern Munich. The match was originally scheduled for 23 May 2020 but the German Football Association postponed the final on 24 April due to the COVID-19 pandemic in Germany.

On 24 July 2020, the Coupe de France final was played behind doors between Paris Saint-Germain F.C. and AS Saint-Étienne. The match was originally scheduled for 25 April, but was postponed due to concerns over the COVID-19 pandemic in France.

On 25 July 2020, the 2020 Russian Cup final was played at Yekaterinburg Arena contested by FC Zenit Saint Petersburg and FC Khimki. Attendance was limited to 10% of the arena's capacity and as a result there were only 3,408 spectators.

On 1 August 2020, the FA Cup final was played behind closed doors between Arsenal F.C. and Chelsea F.C. It was originally scheduled for 23 May, but it was postponed due to the COVID-19 pandemic in the United Kingdom. As part of precautions against COVID-19, Arsenal received the trophy on the pitch and not, as in previous seasons, by climbing steps to the Royal Box for the presentation.

That same day, the Taça de Portugal final was played behind doors between S.L. Benfica and FC Porto. The final was originally scheduled to take place on 24 May 2020 at the Estádio Nacional venue in Oeiras. However, on 12 March, the Portuguese Football Federation (FPF) announced that it would be postponed due to the COVID-19 pandemic in Portugal. On 2 July, it was announced that the final would be played at the Estádio Cidade de Coimbra in Coimbra.

On 7 August 2020, the 2020 Russian Cup final was played at VEB Arena in Moscow contested by FC Zenit Saint Petersburg and FC Lokomotiv Moscow. Attendance was limited due to the COVID-19 pandemic in Russia.

The 2019–20 UEFA Champions League was resumed in August. The quarter-finals onwards were played as single-match knockout ties at neutral venues in Lisbon, Portugal (Estádio da Luz and Estádio José Alvalade) behind closed doors from 12 to 23 August.

The schedule and the format of the 2020–21 UEFA Champions League was changed. The tournament would originally have started in June 2020, but was delayed to August due to the COVID-19 pandemic in Europe. The new schedule was announced by the UEFA Executive Committee on 17 June 2020. All qualifying matches, excluding the play-off round, were played as single leg matches, hosted by one of the teams decided by draw (except the preliminary round which was played at neutral venue).

In the 2020–21 UEFA Champions League preliminary round, Kosovar club Drita's match against Linfield in Nyon, Switzerland was called off, due to two players from Drita testing positive for COVID-19 and the whole team being put into quarantine by the Swiss authorities; eventually, Linfield was awarded a 3–0 win. In the first qualifying round of the same competition, Faroese club KÍ was awarded a 3–0 win over Slovan Bratislava, in which the match was initially postponed after one staff member from the latter tested positive for COVID-19, followed by a player from this same team, eventually the whole team was put into quarantine by the Faroese authorities, and KÍ were subsequently awarded a technical victory.

On 17 September 2020, a German team, SG Ripdorf/Molzen ll, lost 37–0 against SV Holdenstedt ll in 3. Kreisklasse. SV Holdenstedt II who came into contact in a previous game with someone who tested positive for COVID-19, refused to reschedule the match; hence, SG Ripdorf/Molzen ll competed with only seven men for fear of infection and did not offer any resistance.

On 24 September 2020, the UEFA Super Cup was played. The match was originally scheduled to be played at the Estádio do Dragão in Porto, on 12 August 2020. However, after the COVID-19 pandemic in Europe caused the postponements of the previous season's Champions League and Europa League, the UEFA Executive Committee chose to award the rescheduled Champions League final to Portugal, and postponed and relocated the Super Cup to Puskás Aréna in Budapest. The UEFA Executive Committee decided to use the event as a pilot match for which a reduced number of spectators, up to 30% of the capacity of the stadium, were allowed in, becoming the first official UEFA match to have spectators since their competitions were resumed in August 2020.

On 30 September 2020, Bayern Munich and Borussia Dortmund played behind doors the 2020 DFL-Supercup at the Allianz Arena, when the match is usually played in July or August prior to the start of the Bundesliga.

On 4 October 2020, Italian club Napoli decided not to travel to Turin to play a Serie A match against Juventus, following the Azienda Sanitaria Locale (ASL) protocol as two of their players tested positive for COVID-19 along with a staff member. On 14 October, Juventus were awarded a 3–0 win, and Napoli were deducted 1 point by the Disciplinary Commission as punishment for violating the FIGC COVID-19 protocol approved by the Technical-Scientific Committee of the Ministry of Health regarding the activity of professional athletes. On 22 December, the CONI Guarantee Board, overturned the previous decision of the competition judge, accepting the appeal presented by Napoli against the defeat by default and the point deduction and stating that the match must be played. The next day, Lega Serie A postponed the match to a date to be determined following the decision. On 7 April 2021, the match was finally played with a 2–1 victory for Juventus.

On 23 December 2020, FC Porto and S.L. Benfica played behind doors the 2020 Supertaça at the Estádio Municipal de Aveiro. The match was originally scheduled for the end of July or start of August, but was postponed due to concerns over the COVID-19 pandemic.

In January 2021, Arsenal received a £120m loan from the Bank of England to help offset the impact of the COVID-19 pandemic.

That same month took place the 2020–21 Supercopa de España. The competition was initially supposed to be held in Saudi Arabia like the previous year, but restrictions related to the global COVID-19 pandemic forced it to remain in Spain. The semi-finals were played behind doors in the cities of Córdoba and Málaga, on 13 and 14 January 2021. The final was played at Estadio de La Cartuja in Seville on 17 January 2021.

On 13 January 2021, took place the 2020 Trophée des Champions. The final was initially supposed to be held outside of France, but restrictions related to the global COVID-19 pandemic forced it to remain in the country. The match was finally played behind doors at the Stade Bollaert-Delelis in Lens.

On 20 January 2021, took place the 2020 Supercoppa Italiana. The match was initially supposed to be held in December in Saudi Arabia like the previous year, but restrictions related to the global COVID-19 pandemic forced it to remain in Italy. The trophy was finally disputed behind doors at the Mapei Stadium – Città del Tricolore.

On 17 February 2021, the UEFA Executive Committee decided to cancel the 2020–21 UEFA Youth League.

On 30 March 2021, UEFA announced that both Champions League quarter-final matches on 7 and 13 April between FC Porto and Chelsea would be played at Ramón Sánchez Pizjuán Stadium, Seville, Spain, due to travel restrictions between Portugal and the United Kingdom.

On 29 May 2021, the 2021 UEFA Champions League final between Manchester City and Chelsea was disputed. The final was originally scheduled to be played at the Krestovsky Stadium in Saint Petersburg, Russia. However, due to the postponement and relocation of the 2020 final to Lisbon as a result of the COVID-19 pandemic in Europe, the final hosts were shifted back a year, with the Atatürk Olympic Stadium in Istanbul, Turkey instead planning to host the 2021 final. Two weeks before the final, UEFA announced that it would be relocated to Porto, Portugal to allow a limited number of fans to attend the match. A capacity limit of 33% was agreed for the 50,000-seater Estádio do Dragão, resulting in an attendance of 14,110.

In December 2021, the German government imposed measures which affected the 2021–22 Bundesliga matches. As a result, the 2G+ rule was implemented and clubs were allowed an attendance of up to 50% and a maximum of 15,000 fans into stadiums in some states, while in other states spectators were once again banned from attending games. This also affected two matches in the 2021–22 UEFA Champions League – RB Leipzig vs. Manchester City F.C. and FC Bayern Munich vs. FC Barcelona – which were played behind closed doors. Restrictions were later extended to all the country, limiting the number of spectators or completely banning the presence of them, up to and including the 9 February 2022.

Other December 2021 group stage Champions League matches played without spectators due to COVID-19 restrictions in their respective countries were AFC Ajax vs. Sporting CP and FC Red Bull Salzburg vs. Sevilla FC.

=== North America ===
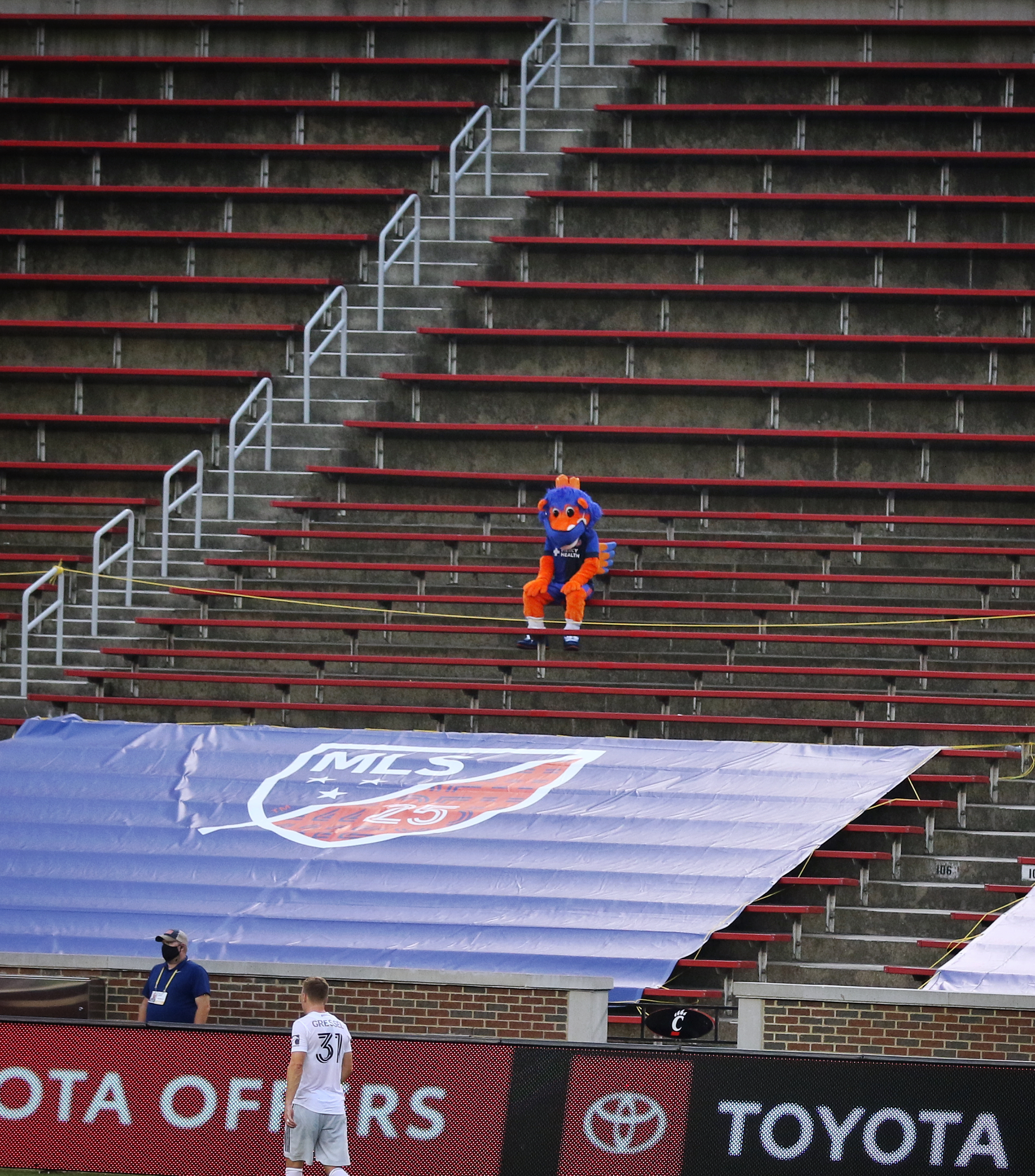
An FC Cincinnati match during the 2020 Major League Soccer season played without fans (August 2020)

On 12 March 2020, the CONCACAF Champions League was suspended with immediate effect. All other CONCACAF competitions scheduled for the next month were also suspended. On 10 November, it was announced that the competition would resume in December and be played in Orlando with single-leg, neutral venue matches.

The Liga Primera de Nicaragua was the only football league in the American continent that was still underway.

Also on 12 March, the National Women's Soccer League (NWSL), whose season was not scheduled to start until 18 April, canceled its preseason matches, and also imposed a moratorium on team training that initially ran through 22 March.

On 12 March Major League Soccer was suspended for 30 days. On 19 March, Major League Soccer's suspension was extended to a target return date of 10 May. On 14 April, MLS announced that it was "extremely unlikely based on the guidance of federal and local public health authorities" that they would meet this target, and stated that "our goal remains to play as many games as possible, and while we currently have enough dates to play the entire season, we recognize at this time that it may become difficult to do so." The 2020 U.S. Open Cup, 2020 Leagues Cup, 2020 Campeones Cup and 2020 MLS All-Star Game were also all cancelled.

On 20 March, the Canadian Premier League announced a postponement of their season which was scheduled to start on 11 April.

The 2019–20 Major Arena Soccer League season was terminated early, effective 12 March.

The USL Championship suspended the 2020 season on 12 March, for at least 30 days.

The National Independent Soccer Association suspended the Spring portion of its 2019–20 season on 12 March for at least 30 days. On 27 April, following a second suspension of play, NISA announced it would cancel the rest of its 2020 Spring season.

Match week 10 of Liga MX, Women's Liga MX, and Ascenso MX took place but as of 15 March, club owners and league executives had then taken a decision to postpone all Mexican football activity until further notice. As of 22 May, Mexican football executives announce the termination of the remainder of the current Clausura 2020 championship.

On 10 June, Major League Soccer announced a return to action on 8 July with a mini-tournament, called the MLS is Back Tournament at the ESPN Wide World of Sports Complex at Walt Disney World near Orlando, Florida, with all group stage matches counting towards the regular season standings. The regular season was then resumed with fewer fixtures and reduced or no attendance allowed, with the playoffs beginning in November. Canadian teams in the league had to play the remainder of their fixtures in the United States, due to travel restrictions between the borders. This would later continue through the 2021 season after travel restrictions continued to remain in effect.

On 24 July, Liga MX inaugurated the 2020–21 Liga MX season, also known as Torneo Guard1anes 2020. The season was dedicated to Mexico's frontline healthcare and medical staff. Mazatlán F.C. debuted in Liga MX, replacing the dissolved Monarcas Morelia.

On 29 July, the Canadian Premier League announced a return to play on 13 August with a modified format called "The Island Games" to determine a 2020 champion. These games were played behind closed doors at the University of Prince Edward Island in Charlottetown, Prince Edward Island. The shortened season ended in September with the Finals.

=== South America ===
On 12 March 2020, CONMEBOL announced that the Copa Libertadores would be temporarily suspended. The tournament was suspended after group stage matchday 2 and resumed on 15 September 2020, ending with the final on 30 January 2021. In addition, the Copa Sudamericana have been suspended after first round due to the COVID-19 pandemic, to be resumed on 27 October 2020, with the final rescheduled to be played in late January 2021.

On 15 March, all top-tier football in Brazil was suspended until April. The Campeonato Brasileiro Série A was originally scheduled to begin on 3 May and end on 6 December. However, due to the COVID-19 pandemic in Brazil the tournament was rescheduled, starting on 8 August 2020 and ending on 25 February 2021.

Academic research analyzes and compares the safe return protocols of major football leagues and associations to those of the Brazilian Championship, as well as to survey the numbers of COVID-19 outbreaks in clubs that competed in the 2020 Brazilian Championship Series A. The documentary research was carried out through the analysis of articles published on open-source football league and federation websites. National and international return protocols were verified, as well as the documenting of isolated cases and outbreaks of COVID-19 in the Brazilian Championship. In the Brazilian Championship, the return to play occurred at a time when COVID-19 case numbers were rising, a fact that, together with the decentralization of the match cities, was likely linked to the number of positive cases.

=== Oceania ===
In New Zealand, the three main competitions, the New Zealand Football Championship, the Chatham Cup and the Kate Sheppard Cup were all cancelled by New Zealand Football. The 2019–20 New Zealand Football Championship season was concluded after 18 weeks, with Auckland City declared the winner. On 23 April, both the national Men's and Women's knock-out cups were cancelled a week before the preliminary rounds were due to kick off. It was the first time the Chatham Cup had been cancelled since the end of World War II.

On 15 January 2021, FIFA announced that Auckland City had withdrawn from the 2020 FIFA Club World Cup, due to the COVID-19 pandemic and related quarantine measures required by the New Zealand authorities. On 4 June 2021, the OFC announced that the 2021 OFC Champions League had been cancelled, and no champions would be awarded for the second season in a row.

== International football ==
On 13 March 2020, FIFA announced that clubs did not have to release players to their national teams during the international windows of March and April 2020, while players also had the option to decline a call-up without any consequences. FIFA also recommended that all international matches during these windows be postponed, though the final decision was left to the competition organisers or member associations for friendly matches.

=== FIFA World Cup qualification ===
The qualifiers for the 2022 FIFA World Cup was disrupted by the COVID-19 pandemic. In March 2020, it was announced that Asian qualifier matches due to take place in March and June 2020 were postponed to later dates. The South American qualifiers due to take place in March 2020 were also postponed to later dates.

=== FIFA Club World Cup ===
The 2020 FIFA Club World Cup was postponed from 2020 to 2021, as the AFC, CONMEBOL, and CONCACAF champions would not have been decided in time for the tournament. Originally to be held in December 2020, on 17 November of the same year FIFA announced that the competition would be played between 1 and 11 February 2021.

Originally seven teams were to compete in the tournament. However, OFC's representatives Auckland City withdrew due to the COVID-19 pandemic and related quarantine measures required by the New Zealand authorities. As a result, only six teams competed, and the first round match, originally scheduled on 1 February 2021, was awarded as a 3–0 win to their first round opponents, host Qatar's representatives Al-Duhail, who advanced automatically to the second round on 4 February 2021.

Attendance was limited to only 30% of the stadiums' seating capacity. A third stadium in Al Rayyan, Khalifa International Stadium, would originally have hosted two matches, but following the withdrawal of Auckland City and the subsequent revision of the match schedule, it was not used for the tournament.

The 2021 edition was also affected by COVID-19 restrictions. On 4 December 2020, the FIFA Council announced that the Club World Cup would be held in late 2021 and hosted by Japan. However, on 8 September 2021, the Japan Football Association dropped its commitment to host the tournament, owing to the possibility of restrictions on fan attendance due to the COVID-19 pandemic in Japan. On 20 October 2021, the FIFA Council named the United Arab Emirates as the host of the tournament, and postponed the event from late 2021 to early 2022.

Also, on 4 June 2021, the OFC announced that the 2021 OFC Champions League had been cancelled due to border closures throughout the Pacific caused by the COVID-19 pandemic, and no champions would be awarded. The OFC representative at the 2021 FIFA Club World Cup, which would have originally been the winners of the 2021 OFC Champions League, was confirmed to be Auckland City by the OFC on 3 August 2021. The team was chosen by the OFC Executive Committee based on sporting merit principles, which used an overall ranking which took into consideration the final placing of each OFC Champions League between 2016 and 2020, and applied to the clubs nominated by their member association to qualify for the 2021 OFC Champions League. However, on 31 December 2021, Auckland City withdrew from the competition due to delayed reopening of the borders in New Zealand related to the COVID-19 pandemic, and the reintroduction of the mandatory managed isolation and quarantine system upon returning to the country. As a result, Tahitian AS Pirae were nominated as the OFC's representative in their place.

=== Continental tournaments ===
On 9 March 2020, the Oceania Football Confederation (OFC) announced that all tournaments were postponed until May 2020.

On 17 March 2020, the CAF announced that the 2020 African Nations Championship had been postponed to a later date due to the pandemic. On 30 June CAF announced that the tournament would be held in January 2021.

On 10 September 2020, the AFC announced that the 2020 AFC Solidarity Cup would be cancelled.

Concerns were raised regarding UEFA Euro 2020, being held in twelve host cities across Europe, and the potential impact of the coronavirus on players, staff and tournament visitors. UEFA president Aleksander Čeferin said the organisation was confident that the situation could be dealt with, while general secretary Theodore Theodoridis stated that UEFA was maintaining contact with the World Health Organization and national governments regarding the coronavirus. UEFA announced that a videoconference would be held on 17 March with representatives of its 55 member associations, along with a FIFPro representative and the boards of the European Club Association and European Leagues, to discuss the response to the outbreak for domestic and European competitions, including Euro 2020. The tournament was moved by 12 months. On 23 April 2021, UEFA announced that Seville (La Cartuja) would replace Bilbao as tournament host, while the matches of Dublin (Aviva Stadium) would be reallocated to Saint Petersburg for the group stage and London for the round of 16.

Similarly, the UEFA Women's Euro was moved from 2021 to 2022, due to the original dates clashing with the rearranged 2020 Summer Olympics dates.

On 17 March 2020, CONMEBOL announced that the 2020 edition of Copa América was postponed to 2021.

On 21 April 2020, the Oceania Football Confederation announced that due to the pandemic and the difficulty in rescheduling to another date in the FIFA International Match Calendar, the 2020 OFC Nations Cup would be cancelled.

In the 2020–21 UEFA Nations League, two matches: Romania v Norway and Switzerland v Ukraine, were cancelled due to positive tests in the Norwegian and Ukrainian team respectively. As a result, the quarantine prevented them from travelling.

The 2022 AFC Women's Asian Cup was marred with COVID-19 cases among many of its participating teams. Most affected were host India who were forced to withdraw from the tournament due to too many players rendered unavailable either due to COVID-19 or injuries.

=== Olympic Games ===
The football tournament of the 2020 Summer Olympics was held from 22 July to 7 August 2021. Originally, it was to be held from 23 July to 8 August 2020, but the Summer Olympics were postponed to the following year due to the COVID-19 pandemic. Teams participating in the men's competition were restricted to under-24 players (born on or after 1 January 1997) with a maximum of three overage players allowed. The men's tournament is typically restricted to under-23 players though following the postponement of the Olympics by a year, FIFA decided to maintain the restriction of players born on or after 1 January 1997.

Due to the COVID-19 pandemic in Japan, most matches of both Men's and Women's tournament were played behind closed doors without any spectators. However, Miyagi Stadium allowed a limited audience to attend matches and Kashima Stadium permitted local schoolchildren as part of the school program but Olympic spectators were still not allowed.

=== Olympic qualification ===
Play-off matches between South Korea and China in the 2020 AFC Women's Olympic Qualifying Tournament were also postponed.

=== Youth tournaments ===
On 3 April 2020, FIFA announced that the 2020 FIFA U-20 Women's World Cup, scheduled to be held in Panama and Costa Rica in August, and the 2020 FIFA U-17 Women's World Cup, scheduled to be held in India in November, would be postponed and rescheduled.

== Collegiate soccer ==
Two National Collegiate Athletic Association Division I members announced that they had eliminated their men's soccer teams effective immediately. First, on 14 April, the University of Cincinnati shuttered its team, citing "profound challenges and widespread uncertainty" resulting from the pandemic. Then, on 26 May, Appalachian State University dropped three men's teams, including soccer, "in response to the financial impact of the COVID-19 pandemic".

- The Atlantic 10 Men's Soccer Tournament, for the 2020 season only, will be reduced from eight teams to four, to minimize travel and contamination.
- The Big East Conference divided into two divisions, the "East" and "Midwest" divisions to minimize travel and to regionalize conference play.
- The Big South Conference Men's Soccer Tournament, for the 2020 season only, will be reduced from six teams to four, to minimize travel and contamination.
- The Big West Conference cancelled the entirety of the league's 2020 season.
- The Metro Atlantic Athletic Conference, announced that the men's soccer season will begin on 11 September, rather than 28 August.
- The Mid-American Conference discontinued its men's and women's soccer tournaments.
- The Southern Conference Men's Soccer Tournament, for the 2020 season only, will be reduced from six teams to four, to minimize travel and contamination.

== List of affected events ==
=== Leagues ===
List of affected top-flight football leagues:

==== Curtailed ====
League	Country	Season	Start date	Cancellation date	Champions (if awarded)	Source
Liga Panameña de Fútbol	Panama	Apertura 2020	25 January 2020	17 March 2020	None	
New Zealand Football Championship	New Zealand	2019–20	1 November 2019	18 March 2020	Auckland City	
Primera División de El Salvador	El Salvador	Clausura 2020	18 January 2020	20 March 2020	None	
Liga Nacional de Guatemala	Guatemala	Clausura 2020	17 January 2020	25 March 2020	None	
Super League Vrouwenvoetbal	Belgium	2019–20	23 August 2019	27 March 2020	RSC Anderlecht	
Mauritian Premier League	Mauritius	2019–20	22 November 2019	6 April 2020	None	
Czech First Division (women)	Czech Republic	2019–20	17 August 2019	7 April 2020	Slavia Praha	
Premier League of Belize	Belize	2019–20 C	11 January 2020	18 April 2020	None	
I-League	India	2019–20	30 November 2019	18 April 2020	Mohun Bagan	
ÖFB Frauen Bundesliga	Austria	2019–20	17 August 2019	22 April 2020	None	
Eredivisie	Netherlands	2019–20	2 August 2019	24 April 2020	None	
Eredivisie Vrouwen	Netherlands	2019–20	23 August 2019	24 April 2020	None	
Primera División	Argentina	2019–20	26 July 2019	28 April 2020	Boca Juniors	
Ligue 1	France	2019–20	9 August 2019	28 April 2020	Paris Saint-Germain	
Division 1 Féminine	France	2019–20	24 August 2019	28 April 2020	Olympique Lyonnais	
Luxembourg National Division	Luxembourg	2019–20	3 August 2019	28 April 2020	None	
Liga Nacional	Honduras	Clausura 2020	10 January 2020	29 April 2020	None	
Girabola	Angola	2019–20	November 2019	30 April 2020	None	
Gibraltar National League	Gibraltar	2019–20	12 August 2019	1 May 2020	None	
Guinée Championnat National	Guinea	2019–20	October 2019	1 May 2020	None	
Kenya Premier League	Kenya	2019–20	2019	1 May 2020	Gor Mahia	
Niger Premier League	Niger	2019–20	2019	4 May 2020	None	
Burkinabé Premier League	Burkina Faso	2019–20	16 August 2019	5 May 2020	None	
Congo Premier League	Republic of the Congo	2019–20	5 October 2019	5 May 2020	AS Otohô	
Ethiopian Premier League	Ethiopia	2019–20	November 2019	5 May 2020	None	
Liberian First Division	Liberia	2020	29 December 2019	4 May 2020	None	
Primera División (women)	Spain	2019–20	7 September 2019	6 May 2020	Barcelona	
Elite One	Cameroon	2020	2020	12 May 2020	PWD Bamenda	
Linafoot	Democratic Republic of the Congo	2019–20	15 August 2019	13 May 2020	TP Mazembe	
Jupiler Pro League	Belgium	2019–20	26 July 2019	15 May 2020	Club Brugge	
Cypriot First Division	Cyprus	2019–20	23 August 2019	15 May 2020	None	
National Premier League	Jamaica	2019–20	1 September 2019	15 May 2020	None	
Venezuelan Primera División	Venezuela	2020	30 January 2020	15 May 2020	None	
Tahiti Ligue 1	Tahiti	2019–20	27 September 2019	16 May 2020	Pirae	
Bangladesh Premier League	Bangladesh	2020	13 February 2020	17 May 2020	None	
Maltese Premier League	Malta	2019–20	23 August 2019	18 May 2020	Floriana	
Scottish Premiership	Scotland	2019–20	3 August 2019	18 May 2020	Celtic	
Cymru Premier	Wales	2019–20	16 August 2019	19 May 2020	Connah's Quay Nomads	
Uganda Premier League	Uganda	2019–20	2019	20 May 2020	Vipers	
FUFA Women Super League	Uganda	2019–20	2019	20 May 2020	None	
GFA League First Division	The Gambia	2019–20	6 December 2019	21 May 2020	None	
South Sudan Football Championship	South Sudan	2020	20 February 2020	21 May 2020	None	
Liga MX	Mexico	Clausura 2020	10 January 2020	22 May 2020	None	
Liga MX Femenil	Mexico	Clausura 2020	4 January 2020	22 May 2020	None	
Rwanda Premier League	Rwanda	2019–20	4 October 2019	22 May 2020	APR	
FA Women's Super League	England	2019–20	7 September 2019	25 May 2020	Chelsea	
Togolese Championnat National	Togo	2019–20	6 October 2019	26 May 2020	ASKO Kara	
Lebanese Premier League	Lebanon	2019–20	20 September 2019	28 May 2020	None	
Premijer liga	Bosnia and Herzegovina	2019–20	20 July 2019	1 June 2020	Sarajevo	
Iraqi Premier League	Iraq	2019–20	18 September 2019	3 June 2020	None	
Macedonian First Football League	North Macedonia	2019–20	11 August 2019	4 June 2020	Vardar	
Serie A (women)	Italy	2019–20	14 September 2019	8 June 2020	Juventus	
Botswana Premier League	Botswana	2019–20	31 August 2019	15 June 2020	Jwaneng Galaxy	
UAE Pro League	United Arab Emirates	2019–20	19 September 2019	18 June 2020	None	
Benin Premier League	Benin	2019–20	6 October 2019	29 June 2020	None	
Ghana Premier League	Ghana	2019–20	28 December 2019	30 June 2020	None	
Turkish Women's First Football League	Turkey	2019–20	20 October 2019	8 July 2020	None	
Senegal Premier League	Senegal	2019–20	7 December 2019	9 July 2020	None	
Nigeria Professional Football League	Nigeria	2019–20	3 November 2019	10 July 2020	None	
Sierra Leone National Premier League	Sierra Leone	2019–20	4 December 2019	15 July 2020	None	
Algerian Ligue Professionnelle 1	Algeria	2019–20	15 August 2019	29 July 2020	CR Belouizdad	

==== Postponed ====
League	Country	Season	Original schedule	Postponed	Resumed	Source
Ýokary Liga	Turkmenistan	2020	6 March 2020 (start date)	23 March 2020	19 April 2020	
K League 1	South Korea	2020	29 February – 4 October 2020	24 February 2020	8 May 2020	
Faroe Islands Premier League	Faroe Islands	2020	8 March 2020 – 7 November 2020	8 March 2020	9 May 2020	
Bundesliga	Germany	2019–20	16 August 2019 – 27 June 2020	13 March 2020	16 May 2020	
Liga FPD	Costa Rica	Clausura 2020	11 January 2020 – 17 or 31 May 2020	18 March 2020	19 May 2020	
Meistriliiga	Estonia	2020	6 March 2020 – 7 November 2020	8 March 2020	19 May 2020	
Nemzeti Bajnokság I	Hungary	2019–20	21 July 2019 – May 2020	16 March 2020	17 May 2020	
Burundi Premier League	Burundi	2019–20	10 August 2019 – April 2020	5 April 2020	21 May 2020	
Czech First League	Czech Republic	2019–20	12 July 2019 – May 2020	12 March 2020	25 May 2020	
Syrian Premier League	Syria	2019–20	20 October 2019 – May 2020	9 March 2020	28 May 2020	
Danish Superliga	Denmark	2019–20	12 July 2019 – 24 May 2020	12 March 2020	29 May 2020	
Frauen-Bundesliga	Germany	2019–20	17 August 2019 – 17 May 2020	16 March 2020	29 May 2020	
Ekstraklasa	Poland	2019–20	12 July 2019 – 17 May 2020	13 March 2020	29 May 2020	
A Lyga	Lithuania	2020	8 March 2020 – 7 November 2020	12 March 2020	30 May 2020	
SuperLiga	Serbia	2019–20	19 July 2019 – May 2020	15 March 2020	30 May 2020	
Ukrainian Premier League	Ukraine	2019–20	28 July 2019 – May 2020	17 March 2020	30 May 2020	
Israeli Premier League	Israel	2019–20	24 August 2019 – May 2020	12 March 2020	30 May 2020	
Montenegrin First League	Montenegro	2019–20	3 August 2019 – May 2020	13 March 2020	1 June 2020	
Austrian Football Bundesliga	Austria	2019–20	26 July 2019 – 7 March 2020	18 March 2020	2 June 2020	
Kategoria Superiore	Albania	2019–20	23 August 2019 – May 2020	12 March 2020	3 June 2020	
Primeira Liga	Portugal	2019–20	9 August 2019 – 17 May 2020	12 March 2020	3 June 2020	
First Professional Football League	Bulgaria	2019–20	12 July 2019 – May 2020	13 March 2020	5 June 2020	
Slovenian PrvaLiga	Slovenia	2019–20	13 July 2019 – 15 May 2020	12 March 2020	5 June 2020	
V.League 1	Vietnam	2020	6 March 2020 (start date)	16 March 2020 (first suspension); 26 July 2020 (second suspension)	5 June 2020 (first resumption); 9 October 2020 (second resumption)	
Croatian First Football League	Croatia	2019–20	19 July 2019 – May 2020	12 March 2020	6 June 2020	
Super League Greece	Greece	2019–20	24 August 2019 – May 2020	13 March 2020	6 June 2020	
La Liga	Spain	2019–20	16 August 2019 – 24 May 2020	12 March 2020	11 June 2020	
Liga I	Romania	2019–20	12 July 2019 – June 2020	12 March 2020	12 June 2020	
Süper Lig	Turkey	2019–20	16 August 2019 – May 2020	19 March 2020	12 June 2020	
Slovak First Football League	Slovakia	2019–20	20 July 2019 – 24 May 2020	12 March 2020	13 June 2020	
Allsvenskan	Sweden	2020	4 April 2020 – 8 November 2020	19 March 2020	14 June 2020	
Eliteserien	Norway	2020	4 April 2020 – 29 November 2020	12 March 2020	16 June 2020	
Premier League	England	2019–20	9 August 2019 – 17 May 2020	13 March 2020	17 June 2020	
Russian Premier League	Russia	2019–20	12 July 2019 – May 2020	17 March 2020	19 June 2020	
League of Ireland	Republic of Ireland	2020	14 February 2020 – 30 October 2020	12 March 2020	31 July 2020	
Swiss Super League	Switzerland	2019–20	19 July 2019 – May 2020	28 February 2020	19 June 2020	
Serie A	Italy	2019–20	25 August 2019 – 24 May 2020	9 March 2020	20 June 2020	
Persian Gulf Pro League	Iran	2019–20	23 August 2019 – May 2020	11 March 2020	24 June 2020	
Veikkausliiga	Finland	2020	3 April 2020 – 1 September 2020	13 March 2020	1 July 2020	
Kazakhstan Premier League	Kazakhstan	2020	7 March 2020 (start date)	16 March 2020	1 July 2020 (first resumption); 18 August 2020 (second resumption)	
J1 League	Japan	2020	21 February – 5 December 2020	25 February 2020	4 July 2020	
Major League Soccer	United States; Canada	2020	29 February – 7 November 2020	12 March 2020	8 July 2020	
A-League	Australia	2019–20	11 October – 26 April 2020	24 March 2020	17 July 2020	
Nadeshiko League	Japan	2020	2 May 2020 (start date)	March 2020	18 July 2020	
Paraguayan Primera División	Paraguay	2020	17 January 2020 (start date)	13 March 2020	21 July 2020	
Qatar Stars League	Qatar	2019–20	21 August 2019 – April 2020	16 March 2020	24 July 2020	
Chinese Super League	China	2020	22 February 2020 – 31 October 2020	30 January 2020	25 July 2020	
Botola	Morocco	2019–20	14 September 2019 – May 2020	14 March 2020	27 July 2020	
Tunisian Ligue Professionnelle 1	Tunisia	2019–20	24 August 2019 – June 2020	16 March 2020	1 August 2020	
Saudi Professional League	Saudi Arabia	2019–20	22 August 2019 – May 2020	15 March 2020	4 August 2020	
Egyptian Premier League	Egypt	2019–20	21 September 2019 – May 2020	14 March 2020	9 August 2020	
Canadian Premier League	Canada	2020	11 April 2020 – 4 October 2020	20 March 2020	13 August 2020	
Philippines Football League	Philippines	2020	May 2020 (start date)	13 March 2020	25 October 2020	

==== Cancelled ====
League	Country	Season	Original schedule	Cancellation date	Source
Philippines Football League	Philippines	2021	21 August 2021 (start date)	22 October 2021	

=== Tournaments ===
==== Cancelled ====
Tournament	Host country	Original schedule	Cancellation date	Source
2020 OFC Nations Cup	New Zealand	6–20 June 2020	21 April 2020	
2020 AFC Solidarity Cup	N/A	30 November – 13 December 2020	10 September 2020	
2020 AFC Cup	N/A	10 February – 7 November 2020	10 September 2020	

=== Awards ===
==== Cancelled ====
Award	Event	Cancellation date	Source
Ballon d'Or	2020 Ballon d'Or	20 July 2020	
Ballon d'Or Féminin	2020 Ballon d'Or	20 July 2020	
Kopa Trophy	2020 Ballon d'Or	20 July 2020	
Yashin Trophy	2020 Ballon d'Or	20 July 2020	
