= Musongati FC =

Burundian association football club

Musongati
- Full name: Musongati Football Club
- Founded: 1976; 50 years ago
- Ground: Stade Ingoma, Gitega, Burundi
- Capacity: 7,000
- Chairman: Dennis Karera
- Manager: Hussein Nahimana
- League: Ligue A
- 2025–26: Ligue A, 2nd of 16
Home colours	Away colours	Third colours

Musongati Football Club, commonly known as Musongati FC or simply Musongati, is a Burundian professional football club based in Gitega, the political capital of Burundi. The club competes in Ligue A, the top level of Burundi's football league system, and plays its home matches at 7,000 capacity Stade Ingoma. Musongati's colours are green and yellow and represent the rich Burundi vegetation.

== History ==
The club was founded in 1976 in the city of Gitega. Musongati promoted to top-flight of the Burundian football at the end of 2015–16 season winning the Group B of the Burundi Second Division.

Musongati achieved a fifth-place finish in the 2016–17 season, the 7th place at the end of the 2017–18 season and reached the quarter-finals of Coupe du Président de la République in 2018, losing 0–2 against BS Dynamik.

The yellow-greens finished as runners-up in the 2018–19 season, as well in the 2019–20 season and won their first major trophy in 2020, the Coupe du Président de la République, beating in the final Rukinzo 1–1 (5–4) at penalty shoot-out.

Musongati consequently made its debut in the CAF Confederation Cup the following season, losing in the preliminary round to Zambian club Green Eagles 2–2 at Stade Intwari in Bujumbura and 1–2 at Nkoloma Stadium in Lusaka.

Over the following two seasons, the yellow-greens returned to mid-table, ending the 2020–21 season in fifth position and ninth in the 2021–22 season. Also, managed to qualify to the semi-finals in 2021 and in the quarter-finals in 2022 of Coupe du President de la Republique, losing each time to city rivals, Flambeau du Centre.

== Honours ==
Burundi Ligue A

- Runners-up (2): 2018–19, 2019–20

Burundi Ligue B

- Winners (1): 2015–16

Burundian Cup

- Winners (1): 2020
- Runners-up (1): 2025

Burundian Super Cup

- Winners (1): 2020

== Performance in CAF competitions ==
Season	Competition	Round	Club	Home	Away	Aggregate
2020–21	CAF Confederation Cup	Preliminary round	(Zambia) Green Eagles	2–2	1–2	2–3

== Squad ==
As of 12 August 2022

Note: Flags indicate national team as defined under FIFA eligibility rules; some limited exceptions apply. Players may hold more than one non-FIFA nationality.

No.	Pos.	Nation	Player
18	MF	BDI	Allidou Hakizimana
3	MF	BDI	Chris Ndikumana
28	DF	BDI	Barros Tambwe
17	DF	BDI	David Sinbagiye
12	DF	BDI	Djuma Muhamedi
2	DF	BDI	Franck Nduwimana
15	MF	BDI	Hamissi Harerimana
4	DF	BDI	Iddy Karikumutima
22	GK	BDI	Ismail Wilonja
13	MF	BDI	Issa Hubert Nsabimana
23	MF	BDI	Desire Nduwimana

No.	Pos.	Nation	Player
20	MF	BDI	Issa Modela
5	DF	BDI	Josue Alberto Mugisha
11	DF	BDI	Kessy Jordan Nimbona
1	GK	BDI	Laurent Sakubu
7	MF	BDI	Mossi Nduwumwe
16	MF	BDI	Numbe Ndayishimiye
10	MF	BDI	Selemahi Halidi
6	DF	BDI	Tresor Mubango
19	FW	BDI	Tresor Shaka
21	DF	BDI	Valentin Nestor Bizimana
14	MF	BDI	Hassan Harerimana

== Management and staff ==
As of 12 August 2022

Position	Name
Head coach	(Burundi) Hussein Nahimana
Assistant coach	(Burundi) Christian Musore
Manager	(Burundi) Christian Musore
Team Doctor	(Burundi) Spageon Nsabimana
Goalkeeper Coach	(Burundi) Schaddien Mugisha
Kit manager	(Burundi) Jean Bosco Ntakarutimana
