= Jean Claude Girumugisha =

Burundian footballer (born 2004)

Personal information
- Date of birth: 18 September 2004 (age 22)
- Place of birth: Bujumbura, Burundi
- Height: 1.73 m (5 ft 8 in)
- Position: Forward

Team information
- Current team: Al Ahli Tripoli
- Number: 17

Senior career*
Years	Team	Apps	(Gls)
2020–2023	Magara Young Boys		
2024–2026	Al Hilal Omdurman		
2026–	Al Ahli Tripoli	0	(0)

International career^{‡}
- Burundi U20
2023–	Burundi	22	(6)
- * Club domestic league appearances and goals as of 18 August 2026 ‡ National team caps and goals as of 13 November 2026

Jean Claude Girumugisha (born 18 September 2004) is a Burundian footballer who plays as a forward for Al Ahli Tripoli.

== Career ==
He won two straight promotions with Magara Young Boys before leaving for Al Hilal Omdurman. The club competes in the Rwanda Premier League due to the Sudanese civil war.

He made a breakthrough in the 2024–25 CAF Champions League group stage, as he scored against TP Mazembe. During the 2025–26 CAF Champions League qualifying rounds, Girumugisha scored against Jamus SC to put his team through. During the 2025–26 CAF Champions League group stage, Girumugisha scored the winning goal against Mamelodi Sundowns. By February 2026, the statistics showed Girumugisha as being the second best dribbler in the CAF Champions League, having registered 8 dribbles, one less than Achraf Bencharki. However, he was also suspended by CAF for "inappropriate", "unsporting conduct".

For the national team, Girumugisha made his debut in November 2023 against Gabon. He scored his first international goal to help secure victory against Malawi in the 2025 Africa Cup of Nations qualification, though this was Burundi's only victory during the campaign.

He later scored once in the 5–0 routing of the Seychelles in the 2026 FIFA World Cup qualification.

=== International goals ===
Scores and results list Burundi's goal tally first.

No.	Date	Venue	Opponent	Score	Result	Competition
1.	5 September 2024	Bingu National Stadium, Lilongwe, Malawi	Malawi	2–1	3–2	2025 Africa Cup of Nations qualification
2.	25 March 2025	Meknes Honor Stadium, Meknes, Morocco	Seychelles	5–0	5–0	2026 FIFA World Cup qualification
3.	27 March 2026	Idriss Déby Itno Stadium, N'Djamena, Chad	Chad	4–0	4–0	2027 Africa Cup of Nations qualification
4.	31 March 2026	Intwari Stadium, Bujumbura, Burundi	Chad	3–0	4–0	2027 Africa Cup of Nations qualification
5.	29 September 2026	Intwari Stadium, Bujumbura, Burundi	Algeria	2–0	2–2	2027 Africa Cup of Nations qualification
6.	13 November 2026	Levy Mwanawasa Stadium, Ndola, Zambia	Zambia	1–1	1–1	2027 Africa Cup of Nations qualification
