= Magara Young Boys =

Magara
- Full name: Magara Young Boys
- Nickname: The Vikings
- Founded: 21 March 2012
- Ground: Stade Urunani
- Capacity: 7,000
- Chairman: Alexis Bandyatuyaga
- Manager: Mailo Nzeyimana
- League: Second Division (II)
- 2025–2026: 5th (Group A)
Home colours	Away colours

Magara Young Boys is a football club based in Magara, Burundi. The team plays in the Burundi Ligue A. The team was founded in March 2012 in Bugarama district, Rumonge Province by Alexis Bandyatuyaga (president) and Shaka Mariamma (manager).

== Colours and badge ==
Magara Young Boys' colors are yellow, black and red.

Magara Young Boys badge has the image of a phoenix rising and clawing a football and the inscription

== Stadium ==
Magara Young Boys play their home matches at Stade Urunani. The stadium has a capacity of 7,000 and is based in the city of Buganda.

== Squad ==
As of 29 October 2022

Note: Flags indicate national team as defined under FIFA eligibility rules; some limited exceptions apply. Players may hold more than one non-FIFA nationality.

No.	Pos.	Nation	Player
1	GK	BDI	Omar Irankunda
6	DF	BDI	Melchesedech Nterere Akezakimana
3	DF	BDI	Elvis Rukundo
9	DF	BDI	Abdillah Hakizimana
12	DF	BDI	Bernard Baryamwabo
17	MF	BDI	Jean Claude Girumugisha
21	MF	BDI	Assoumani Fati Hakizimana
27	FW	BDI	Simplice Malindo Nduwimana
16	MF	BDI	Paulin Jean-Pierre Mpongo

No.	Pos.	Nation	Player
24	FW	BDI	Pavodi Dimandja Osomba
2	GK	BDI	Samuel Ndayishimiye
4	FW	BDI	Ismail Nyandwi
5	MF	BDI	Meshack Ndikumwami
15	MF	BDI	Vareri Nzigiyimana
19	MF	BDI	Fabrice Nshimirimana
20	FW	BDI	Idris Bishaza
30	FW	BDI	Issa Djuma Bitangimana
23	DF	BDI	Ismail Kamana
13	DF	BDI	Ernest Nahayo

== Management and staff ==
Management and staff as of 12 August 2022
Position	Name
Head coach	(Burundi) Mailo Nzeyimana
Assistant coach	(Burundi) Jean Bosco Bigirimana
DTA	(Burundi) Salum Fahim Gahinga
Team Doctor	(Burundi) Onias Dusabe
Goalkeeper Coach	(Burundi) Ally Bwenge
Fans Coordinator	(Burundi) Sadiki Nzisabura
