= Tigre Noir Ruyigi =

Football club based in Bujumbura, Burundi

Tigre Noir FC
- Full name: Tigre Noir FC Ruyigi
- Nickname: The Warriors
- Ground: Prince Louis Rwagasore Stadium
- Capacity: 10,000
- Manager: Hodin Oleksii
- League: Second Division (II)
- 2025–2026: 4th, Ligue B Group B
Home colours

Tigre Noir Football Club is a football club based in Bujumbura, Burundi. The men's team plays in the Burundi Ligue A.

== Colours and badge ==
Tigre Noir FC's colors are black and white.

The Tigre Noir FC badge has the words, "Force, Determination, Success", an image of a flaming tiger, a football, and the club's date of inception.

== Stadium ==
Tigre Noir FC plays their home matches at Prince Louis Rwagasore Stadium. The stadium has a capacity of 10,000. It is renamed on 1 July 2019 after former Burundian prime minister and independence hero, Louis Rwagasore. It was formerly known as Stade Intwari.

== Squad ==
As of 24 October 2022

Note: Flags indicate national team as defined under FIFA eligibility rules; some limited exceptions apply. Players may hold more than one non-FIFA nationality.

| No. | Pos. | Nation | Player |
|---|---|---|---|
| 25 | GK | BDI | Jean Marie Harerimana |
| 11 | GK | BDI | Ulimwengu Hakizimana |
| 15 | GK | BDI | Samir Bukuru |
| 24 | DF | BDI | Sostene Ndayikengurukiye |
| 27 | DF | BDI | Kevin Icoyitungiye |
| 80 | DF | BDI | Abdi Ineza |
| 17 | DF | BDI | Miradji Gaturo |
| 21 | DF | BDI | Ibrahim Bayisenge |
| 19 | DF | BDI | Elvis Kadashira |
| 23 | DF | BDI | Saleh Aslam |

| No. | Pos. | Nation | Player |
|---|---|---|---|
| 3 | MF | BDI | Karim Kamana |
| 20 | MF | BDI | Fleury Baritonda |
| 18 | MF | BDI | Pacifique Habonimana |
| 8 | MF | BDI | Keita Bukuru |
| 7 | MF | BDI | Elyssa Niyonsaba |
| 4 | MF | BDI | Arnaud Niyomukiza |
| 9 | MF | BDI | Adelard Igiraneza |
| 10 | FW | BDI | Jean Marie Iradukunda |
| 1 | FW | BDI | Aboubakar Bayisenge |
| 7 | FW | BDI | Guy Ishimwe |

== Management and staff ==
Management and staff as of 12 August 2022
| Position | Name |
|---|---|
| Head coach | (Burundi) Janvier Irakoze |
| Assistant coach | (Burundi) Vincent Masabo |
| Manager | (Burundi) Hodin Oleksin |
| Team Doctor | (Burundi) Eppaphrodite Ndayegamiye |
| Goalkeeper Coach | (Burundi) Jean Berchimas Nimpagaritse |
| Kit Manager | (Burundi) Vincent Masabo |
