= Gilbert Tuyihimbaze =

Burundian footballer

Personal information
- Date of birth: 1 July 1993 (age 33)
- Position: Forward

Team information
- Current team: Guêpiers du Lac

Gilbert Tuyihimbaze is a Burundian professional footballer who plays as a forward for Guêpiers du Lac in the Burundi Football League.

== International career ==
He was invited by Lofty Naseem, the national team coach, to represent Burundi in the 2014 African Nations Championship held in South Africa.
