= Elaga Top Junior =

Top Junior
- Full name: Elaga Top Junior
- Ground: Stade Urunani
- Capacity: 10,000
- Manager: Godfroid Okoko
- League: Burundi Premier League
- 2022: Burundi Premier League, 14th
Home colours	Away colours

Elaga Top Junior is a football club based in Nyanza Lac, Makamba County, Burundi. The team plays in the Burundi Ligue A. The team was originally known as Top Junior Academy but added Elaga after they were promoted to the top league. The team is sponsored by an agricultural and aquaculture company. The team originally from Kayanza County, will be based in Makamba, practice at Nyanza Lac and play at Nkurunziza Peace Park Complex.

== Colours and badge ==
Top Junior colors are white and blue.

Top Junior badge has the image of a leopard and the silhouette of a man about to kick a ball.

== Stadium ==
Top Junior play their home matches at Nkurunziza Peace Park Complex. The stadium has a capacity of 25,000 and is based in Gisenyi in Makamba.

== Squad ==
As of 23 October 2022

Note: Flags indicate national team as defined under FIFA eligibility rules; some limited exceptions apply. Players may hold more than one non-FIFA nationality.

No.	Pos.	Nation	Player
1	GK	BDI	Igor Ishimwe
6	DF	BDI	Edouard Musombwa
3	DF	BDI	Saidi Ndayishimiye
9	DF	BDI	Didier Labil Harerimana
10	DF	BDI	Isaie Niyukuri
12	DF	BDI	Alimas Kineza
17	MF	BDI	Franck Barirengako
21	MF	BDI	Kassim Abdoul Wahidi
27	FW	BDI	Hassan Zirhumana
16	MF	BDI	Yannick Hatungimana

No.	Pos.	Nation	Player
24	FW	BDI	Steve Nzosaba
2	GK	BDI	Bill Mika Nishimwe
4	FW	BDI	Elia Christophe Mweze
5	MF	BDI	Ali Azadi
15	MF	BDI	Christian Hakizimana
19	MF	BDI	Jean Marie Ngendakumana
20	FW	BDI	Didier Harerimana
30	FW	BDI	Seraphin Bigiriana
23	DF	BDI	Romeo Pascal Ngachie
13	DF	BDI	Samola Nganji

== Management and staff ==
Management and staff as of 12 August 2022
Position	Name
Head coach	(Burundi) Godefroid Okoko Lokono
Assistant coach	(Burundi) Jean Luc Bamba
Manager	(Burundi) Jean Luc Bamba
Team Doctor	(Burundi) Jean Claude Bucumi
Goalkeeper Coach	(Burundi) Thierry Muhimpundu
Kit Manager	(Burundi) Jean Luc Bamba
