= Bumamuru FC =

Burundi professional association football club

Bumamuru
- Full name: Bumamuru Standard Football Club
- Nicknames: Buma; Les vertsblancs (The green whites)
- Founded: 31 March 2014; 12 years ago
- Ground: Stade Urunani; Buganda, Burundi
- Capacity: 7,000
- Chairman: Eric Hakizimana
- Manager: Vivier Bahati
- League: Ligue A
- 2025–26: Ligue A, 7th of 16
Home colours	Away colours	Third colours

Bumamuru Football Club, also known as Bumamuru Standard or simply as Bumamuru, is a Burundian professional football club based in Buganda, the Cibitoke Province. The club was founded on 31 March 2014 and currently competes in Ligue A, the top flight of Burundi football, after succeeding in the promotion at the end of the 2017–18 Liga B season. Bumamuru plays its home matches at the Stade Urunani in Buganda. The club colours are green and white and the badge of the club has the Burundi map and its vegetation.

== History ==
In the 2017–18 season, Bumamuru finished third in Group A of Ligue B, Burundi's second division and qualified for the promotion playoff as the 2nd placed team, Transport FC, was subsequently disqualified. Bumamuru won the promotion against Les Eléphants FC after 1–1 on aggregate and 5–4 at penalty shoot-out.

In the first Ligue A season, Bumamuru managed a good fifth-place in the league table with 44 points. In the following two seasons the green and white finished eleventh twice and won the Coupe du Président de la République in 2021, beating Flambeau du Centre 3–1 in the final.

The next season saw the debut of Bumamuru in continental competitions, but were eliminated in the first round of the CAF Confederation Cup by Congolese side Diables Noirs 0–1 on aggregate. The team finished the Liga A season on third-place after was on top of the league involved in the title fight, but a string of bad results saw them dropping down at two points behind champions, Flambeau du Centre. The club won their second Coupe du Président de la République in 2022, beating again 3–1 Flambeau du Centre and qualify for the CAF Confederation Cup.

== Honours ==
Burundi Ligue A

- Champions (1): 2022–23

Burundian Cup

- Winners (2): 2021, 2022
- Runners-up (1): 2023

== Performance in CAF competitions ==
Season	Competition	Round	Club	Home	Away	Aggregate
2021–22	CAF Confederation Cup	First round	(Republic of the Congo) Diables Noirs	0–0	0–1	0–1
2022–23	CAF Confederation Cup	First round	(Ethiopia) Fasil Kenema	2–2	1–2	2–3

== Squad ==
As of 12 August 2022

Note: Flags indicate national team as defined under FIFA eligibility rules; some limited exceptions apply. Players may hold more than one non-FIFA nationality.

No.	Pos.	Nation	Player
21	GK	BDI	Alain Nicolas Dephin Mama
8	DF	BDI	Ally Nzonzima
32	DF	BDI	Ramadhani Salum
22	DF	BDI	Richard Kirongozi Bazombwa
9	DF	BDI	Ben Ahmed Ouattara
22	MF	BDI	Aruna Madjaliwa Mussa
9	FW	BDI	Alfred Nkurunziza
17	MF	BDI	Fabrice Ndagijimana
4	MF	BDI	Rashid Leon Harerimana
21	GK	BDI	Patient Ndikuriyo
14	DF	BDI	Elie Eldhino Mokono

No.	Pos.	Nation	Player
13	DF	BDI	Michel Nduwimana
10	MF	BDI	Shassiri Nahimana
28	DF	BDI	Amani Muhimpundu
26	DF	BDI	James Ssemambo
3	DF	BDI	Issa Hakizmana
27	MF	BDI	Badoux Nihorero
23	GK	BDI	Sadi Ngezahayo
11	MF	BDI	Jamari Bazunza
19	DF	BDI	Richard Kirongozi Bazombwa
29	DF	BDI	Bonfils Ntirandekura
9	DF	BDI	Beh Ahmed Ouattara

== Management and staff ==
As of 12 August 2022

Position	Name
Head coach	(Tanzania) Vivier Bahati
Assistant coach	(Tanzania) Jean Marie Vianney Nduwantare
Manager	(Tanzania) Reverien Sabushimke
Physiotherapist	(Tanzania) Jean Marie Uwizeyimana
Goalkeeper Coach	(Tanzania) Claude Harerimana
Kit Manager	(Tanzania) Warren Chebby Ndayishimiye
Team Doctor	(Tanzania) Jean Claude Habiyaremye
