= Muyinga =

- Location in Burundi
- Coordinates: 2°51′S 30°20′E
- Country: Burundi
- Province: Muyinga Province
- Elevation: 5,679 ft (1,731 m)

Population (2012)
  - Total: 100,715

Muyinga is a city located in northern Burundi. It was the capital city of the former Muyinga Province. It lies at an altitude of 1,731 m and has a population of 100,715.

== Climate ==
Climate data for Muyinga (1961–1990)
Month	Jan	Feb	Mar	Apr	May	Jun	Jul	Aug	Sep	Oct	Nov	Dec	Year
Mean daily maximum °C (°F)	24.9 (76.8)	25.1 (77.2)	24.8 (76.6)	24.2 (75.6)	24.4 (75.9)	25.6 (78.1)	25.5 (77.9)	26.7 (80.1)	27.1 (80.8)	26.2 (79.2)	24.6 (76.3)	24.6 (76.3)	25.3 (77.6)
Mean daily minimum °C (°F)	14.7 (58.5)	14.8 (58.6)	14.9 (58.8)	14.7 (58.5)	14.7 (58.5)	14.0 (57.2)	14.0 (57.2)	14.3 (57.7)	14.8 (58.6)	14.8 (58.6)	14.5 (58.1)	14.5 (58.1)	14.6 (58.2)
Average rainfall mm (inches)	121.8 (4.80)	108.4 (4.27)	156.2 (6.15)	185.4 (7.30)	81.0 (3.19)	9.9 (0.39)	3.3 (0.13)	25.0 (0.98)	58.6 (2.31)	104.5 (4.11)	135.7 (5.34)	155.4 (6.12)	1,145.2 (45.09)
Average rainy days (≥ 0.1 mm)	16	15	18	21	13	2	2	3	10	16	21	19	156
Source: World Meteorological Organization
