= Commune of Buganda =

Coordinates: 2°59′16″S 29°12′18″E

- Commune
- Interactive map of Commune of Buganda
- Country: Burundi
- Province: Cibitoke Province
- Administrative center: Gasenyi, Buganda
- Time zone: UTC+2 (Central Africa Time)

Palace in Buganda

The commune of Buganda is a commune of Cibitoke Province in north-western Burundi. The capital lies at Buganda.
