= Kayanza =

- Location in Burundi
- Coordinates: 2°55′S 29°37′E
- Country: Burundi
- Province: Kayanza Province
- Elevation: 6,421 ft (1,957 m)

Population (2008)
  - Total: 21,767
- Time zone: UTC +2

Kayanza is a city located in northern Burundi, known for its tea and coffee production. It is the capital city of Kayanza Province, subdivided into nine communes from which one is called Kayanza. It is one of the areas with higher population density.

It was the location of significant skirmishes between the Tutsi and Hutu ethnic groups during the Rwandan Civil War.
