= Burundi Sport Dynamik New Look =

BSports Dynamik
- Full name: Burundi Sport Dynamik New Look
- Ground: Intwari Stadium; Bujumbura, Burundi
- Capacity: 10,000
- Manager: Djumaine Niyonkuru
- League: Burundi Ligue A
- Website: https://www.owsports.info/sites/primusleague/teams/241375
Home colours	Away colours

Burundi Sport Dynamik New Look or simply Sports Dynamic is a football (soccer) club from Burundi based in Bujumbura. Their home venue is 10,000 capacity Prince Louis Rwagasore Stadium.

In 1972 the team won the Burundi Premier League.

== Honours ==
- Burundi Premier League
  - Winners (1): 1972

== Performance in CAF competitions ==
- CAF Champions League: 1 appearance

1973 African Cup of Champions Clubs – First Round

== Squad ==
As of 29 October 2022

Note: Flags indicate national team as defined under FIFA eligibility rules; some limited exceptions apply. Players may hold more than one non-FIFA nationality.

No.	Pos.	Nation	Player
1	GK	BDI	Ibrahim Nduwimana
2	GK	BDI	Abubakar Mukunzi
3	DF	BDI	Richard Ndayishimiye
4	FW	BDI	Hussein Ibrahim
5	MF	BDI	Amidou Niyonizigiye
6	DF	BDI	Jeff Mugisha
9	DF	BDI	Arnaud Hakizimana
10	DF	BDI	Yussuf Ndikumana
12	DF	BDI	Shabani Ally Irakoze
13	DF	BDI	Emmanuel Ngama

No.	Pos.	Nation	Player
15	MF	BDI	Sept Bigirimana
16	MF	BDI	Mossi Moussa
17	MF	BDI	Aristote Mpitabakana
19	MF	BDI	Justin Lavie Bigirimana
20	FW	BDI	Aladin Bizimana
21	MF	BDI	Paul Vincent Niyokwizera
23	DF	BDI	Baluani Mvuyekure
24	FW	BDI	Maja Junior Harerimana
27	FW	BDI	Fleury Sinzinkayo
30	FW	BDI	PatientNyembo
