= Kayanza United =

- Full name: Kayanza United
- Founded: 2014; 12 years ago
- Ground: Stade de Gatwaro
- Capacity: 10,000
- League: Ligue A
- 2025–26: Ligue A, 10th of 16
- Website: https://www.owsports.info/sites/primusleague/teams/241379
Home colours	Away colours

Kayanza FC is a professional football club based in Kayanza City, Burundi.

The team currently plays in the Burundi Ligue A, the top division of Burundi football.

== History ==
The club was founded on March 31, 2014. In the 2016/17 season, they reached the round of 16 of the national cup for the first time and in the following season, they also won first place in Ligue B, which allowed them to get promoted to the top-class, Ligue A for the first time. They managed to stay up in the league with 34 points and 12th place. The best placement was in the 2020/21 season, when they had 55 points but lost on goal difference to Le Massager, who also had 55 points and became champions.

== Current team ==
Note: Flags indicate national team as defined under FIFA eligibility rules; some limited exceptions apply. Players may hold more than one non-FIFA nationality.

No.	Pos.	Nation	Player
25	GK	BDI	Abdalla Massudi
11	GK	BDI	Abdi Ndayikeza
15	GK	BDI	Alexandre Rukindo
24	DF	BDI	Alfred Swalehe
27	DF	BDI	Athumani Radjabu
80	DF	BDI	Daniel Hakizimana
17	DF	BDI	Eliphaz Ndayisenga
21	DF	BDI	Eric Ndoriyobija
19	DF	BDI	Etienne Nduwimana
23	DF	BDI	Gilbert Nininahazwe

No.	Pos.	Nation	Player
3	MF	BDI	Jean Kabura
20	MF	BDI	John Franck Nzojibwami
18	MF	BDI	Jules Misago
8	MF	BDI	Junior Dusabe
7	MF	BDI	Lazar Ndabitezimana
4	MF	BDI	Mechak Ndayishimiye
9	MF	BDI	Mustafa Kiraga
10	FW	BDI	Omar Bigirimana
1	FW	BDI	Papy Habuka
7	FW	BDI	Placide Hitimana
12	FW	BDI	Saidi Irakoze

== Management and staff ==
Management and staff as of 12 August 2022
Position	Name
Head coach	(Burundi) Gustave Niyonkuru
Assistant coach	(Burundi) Elvis Nizigiyimana
Manager	(Burundi) Elvis Nizigiyimana
Team Doctor	(Burundi) Edmond Mbarushimana
Goalkeeper Coach	(Burundi) Jean Marie Nsengiyumva
Kit manager	(Burundi) Emile Ndayishimiye
Physiotherapist	(Burundi) Emile Ndayishimiye

== Honors ==
National competitions

- Burundi Premier League::

Runner-up: 2020–2021

- Burundi Cup:

Finalist:

== Achievements ==
- Ligue B: 2017/18 Champions

== Season placement ==
Season	League	Level	Placement
2017/18	Ligue B	2	1.Promoted
2018/19	Ligue A	1	12.
2019/20	Ligue A	1	12.
2020/21	Ligue A	1	2.
2021/22	Ligue A	1	13.
2022/23	Ligue A	1	
