= Aigle Noir Makamba FC =

Association football club in Burundi

Aigle Noir FC
- Full name: Aigle Noir Makamba FC
- Founded: 2009
- Ground: Peace Park Stadium; Makamba, Burundi
- Capacity: 35,000
- Chairman: Mickaël Ngendahayo
- Manager: François Niyomwungeri
- League: Burundi Ligue A
- 2025–26: Champions

Aigle Noir Makamba FC, is a football (soccer) club which was established in Makamba in 2009 and currently playing in the Burundi Premier League.

== Honours ==
- Burundi Premier League
  - Champions (3): 2018–19, 2024–25, 2025–26
- Burundian Cup
  - Winners (2): 2019, 2023
- Burundi Super Cup
  - Winners (3): 2019, 2023, 2026
- Coupe de l'Unité
  - Winners (1): 2020

== Performance in CAF competitions ==
- CAF Champions League: 1 appearance

2020 – Preliminary Round

- CAF Confederation Cup: 0 appearance

== Current team ==
Note: Flags indicate national team as defined under FIFA eligibility rules; some limited exceptions apply. Players may hold more than one non-FIFA nationality.

No.	Pos.	Nation	Player
22	GK	BDI	Aime Fales Ndizeye
10	DF	BDI	Bienvenue Shaka
3	DF	BDI	Viateur Manirakiza
44	DF	BDI	Chriss Bede Ngabo
6	DF	BDI	Collin Muhindo Mashauri
7	MF	BDI	Benit Mugenzi
15	MF	BDI	Darcy Nshimirimana
16	MF	BDI	Narcisse Masudi Baitofola
17	MF	BDI	Kelvin Bizimana
20	DF	BDI	Menayame Ndombe Vingile

No.	Pos.	Nation	Player
9	GK	BDI	Yves Bigirimana
12	MF	BDI	Dash Ndingamosi Rachimane
14	MF	BDI	Evrard Ragiryimana
19	MF	BDI	Elie Lomami Lusanga
23	MF	BDI	Exhauce Mbele Ndombele
26	MF	BDI	Etta Micheal
28	MF	BDI	Verlaine Vusuka Ntsobela
29	FW	BDI	Crispin Kazeda
30	FW	BDI	Thierry Nijimbere
24	FW	BDI	Justin Niyongabo

== Management and staff ==
Position	Name
Head coach	(Burundi) François Niyomwungeri
Assistant coach	(Burundi) Charles Ndungutse
Manager	(Burundi) Pasteur Nduwayo
Team Doctor	(Burundi) Claude Niyonsaba
Goalkeeper Coach	(Burundi) Alain Ndorimana
Kit Manager	(Burundi) Justin Munyangeyo
