= Rukinzo FC =

Rukinzo (Rukinzo FC)
- Full name: Rukinzo Football Club (Rukinzo)
- Founded: 31 March 2015; 11 years ago
- Ground: Intwari, Stade, Bujumbura
- Capacity: 7,000
- Chairman: Edourdo Nahimana
- Manager: Aboubakar Mirubo
- League: Burundi Ligue A
- 2025–26: 5th
- Website: https://www.owsports.info/sites/primusleague/teams/241375
Home colours	Away colours	Third colours

Rukinzo Football Club is a football club based in Bujumbura, Burundi. The club currently plays in the first division, Burundi Ligue A.

== History ==
It was founded in the capital Bujumbura as the representative team of the national police, so the majority of its payroll is made up of serving officers. In the 2017/18 season, they were promoted to the Burundi First Division for the first time after winning their group in the second category.

In their first season in the first division, they finished in sixth place and reached the final of the Burundi Cup for the first time, which they lost against Aigle Noir Makamba FC, a team that ultimately won the league and cup that season.

Being a finalist in the Burundi Cup, Rukinzo qualified for the 2019-20 CAF Confederation Cup, his first international tournament, where they were eliminated in the preliminary round by Triangle United FC from Zimbabwe.

== Honours ==
- Burundian Cup
  - Winners (2): 2024, 2026
  - Runners-up (2): 2019, 2020

== Participation in CAF Competitions ==
Season	Tournament	Round	Club	Home	Away	Global
2019–20	2019–20 CAF Confederation Cup	Preliminary round	(Zimbabwe) Triangle United	0–0	0–5	0–5

== Colours and badge ==
Rukinzo FC's colors are Blue and Green.

The Rukinzo FC badge has a bow, shield and a policeman in a blue beret.

== Stadium ==
Rukinzo FC play their home matches at the Stade Intwari.

== Squad ==
As of 12 August 2022

Note: Flags indicate national team as defined under FIFA eligibility rules; some limited exceptions apply. Players may hold more than one non-FIFA nationality.

No.	Pos.	Nation	Player
22	GK	BDI	Blaise Mugisha
13	DF	BDI	Ciza Paul
15	DF	BDI	Djuma Simpo
20	DF	BDI	Habimana Amissi
19	DF	BDI	Icoyitunga Alain
30	DF	BDI	Iradukunda Didier
5	DF	BDI	Irakoze Jimmy
9	DF	BDI	Jean Pastore
4	DF	BDI	Kavumbagu Jr
9	DF	BDI	Kazhindo Bonfils

No.	Pos.	Nation	Player
14	MF	BDI	Manirambona Elvis
—	FW	BDI	Mpawenimana Abdoul Karim
26	MF	BDI	Muhuza Patient
10	MF	BDI	Munaba Edson
—	MF	BDI	Ndayishimiye Maike
7	FW	BDI	Ndikumana Dany
3	MF	BDI	Niragira Hussein
1	GK	BDI	Nzoyisaba Epimaque
23	GK	BDI	Rugumandiye Yvan
17	DF	BDI	Tuyishime Derrick

== Management and staff ==
Management and staff as of 12 August 2022
Position	Name
Head coach	(Burundi) Aboubakar Miburo
Assistant coach/Team Manager	(Burundi) Philippe Sibomana
Goalkeeper Coach	(Burundi) Yvan Rugumandiye
Kit Manager	(Burundi) Edouard Nahimana
Team Doctor	(Burundi) Prosper Habarugira
