= 2019 Africa Cup of Nations squads =

The 2019 Africa Cup of Nations was an international football tournament that was held in Egypt from 21 June to 19 July 2019. The 24 national teams involved in the tournament were required to register a squad of 23 players, including three goalkeepers. Only players in these squads were eligible to take part in the tournament.

The position and date of birth listed for each player is per the official squad list published by CAF. The age listed for each player is on 21 June 2019, the first day of the tournament. The numbers of caps and goals listed for each player do not include any matches played after the start of tournament. The club listed is the club for which the player last played a competitive match prior to the tournament. The nationality for each club reflects the national association (not the league) to which the club is affiliated. A flag is included for coaches that are of a different nationality than their own national team.

== Group A ==
=== Egypt ===
Head coach: (Mexico) Javier Aguirre

Egypt's 25-man preliminary squad was announced on 21 May 2019. The final squad was announced on 11 June. Amr Warda was excluded from the squad for disciplinary reasons on 26 June. However, the Egyptian Football Association recalled him to the national team on 28 June after Warda posted an apology video on his official Facebook account.

No.	Pos.	Player	Date of birth (age)	Caps	Goals	Club
1	GK	Ahmed El Shenawy	14 May 1991 (aged 28)	31	0	(Egyptian Football Association) Pyramids
2	DF	Baher El Mohamady	1 November 1996 (aged 22)	6	1	(Egyptian Football Association) Ismaily
3	DF	Ahmed El Mohamady (captain)	9 September 1987 (aged 31)	88	4	(The Football Association) Aston Villa
4	DF	Omar Gaber	30 January 1992 (aged 27)	24	1	(Egyptian Football Association) Pyramids
5	DF	Ali Ghazal	1 February 1992 (aged 27)	10	0	(Portuguese Football Federation) Feirense
6	DF	Ahmed Hegazi	25 January 1991 (aged 28)	52	2	(The Football Association) West Bromwich Albion
7	FW	Trézéguet	1 October 1994 (aged 24)	37	5	(Turkish Football Federation) Kasımpaşa
8	MF	Tarek Hamed	24 October 1988 (aged 30)	34	0	(Egyptian Football Association) Zamalek
9	FW	Marwan Mohsen	26 February 1989 (aged 30)	31	7	(Egyptian Football Association) Al Ahly
10	FW	Mohamed Salah	15 June 1992 (aged 27)	63	39	(The Football Association) Liverpool
11	FW	Walid Soliman	1 December 1984 (aged 34)	25	1	(Egyptian Football Association) Al Ahly
12	DF	Ayman Ashraf	9 April 1991 (aged 28)	11	2	(Egyptian Football Association) Al Ahly
13	DF	Ahmed Ayman Mansour	13 April 1994 (aged 25)	4	0	(Egyptian Football Association) Pyramids
14	FW	Ahmed Ali	21 May 1986 (aged 33)	9	5	(Egyptian Football Association) Al Mokawloon Al Arab
15	DF	Mahmoud Hamdy	1 June 1995 (aged 24)	2	0	(Egyptian Football Association) Zamalek
16	GK	Mohamed El Shenawy	18 December 1988 (aged 30)	10	0	(Egyptian Football Association) Al Ahly
17	MF	Mohamed Elneny	11 July 1992 (aged 26)	72	6	(The Football Association) Arsenal
18	FW	Ahmed Hassan Koka	5 March 1993 (aged 26)	21	5	(Hellenic Football Federation) Olympiacos
19	MF	Abdallah El Said	13 July 1985 (aged 33)	43	6	(Egyptian Football Association) Pyramids
20	DF	Mahmoud Alaa	28 January 1991 (aged 28)	4	0	(Egyptian Football Association) Zamalek
21	MF	Nabil Emad	6 April 1996 (aged 23)	4	0	(Egyptian Football Association) Pyramids
22	FW	Amr Warda	17 September 1993 (aged 25)	28	1	(Hellenic Football Federation) Atromitos
23	GK	Mahmoud Genesh	25 May 1987 (aged 32)	2	0	(Egyptian Football Association) Zamalek

=== DR Congo ===
Head coach: Florent Ibengé

DR Congo's 32-man preliminary squad was announced on 22 May 2019. The final squad was announced on 11 June.

No.	Pos.	Player	Date of birth (age)	Caps	Goals	Club
1	GK	Ley Matampi	18 April 1989 (aged 30)	34	0	(Saudi Arabian Football Federation) Al Ansar
2	DF	Issama Mpeko	30 April 1989 (aged 30)	64	1	(Congolese Association Football Federation) TP Mazembe
3	DF	Ngonda Muzinga	31 December 1993 (aged 25)	11	0	(Congolese Association Football Federation) AS Vita Club
4	DF	Bobo Ungenda	19 November 1989 (aged 29)	12	0	(Angolan Football Federation) 1º de Agosto
5	DF	Marcel Tisserand	10 January 1993 (aged 26)	16	0	(German Football Association) VfL Wolfsburg
6	MF	Chadrac Akolo	1 January 1995 (aged 24)	5	0	(German Football Association) VfB Stuttgart
7	MF	Youssouf Mulumbu (captain)	25 January 1987 (aged 32)	39	1	(Scottish Football Association) Kilmarnock
8	MF	Trésor Mputu	17 September 1985 (aged 33)	47	14	(Congolese Association Football Federation) TP Mazembe
9	FW	Jonathan Bolingi	30 June 1994 (aged 24)	23	7	(Royal Belgian Football Association) Antwerp
10	MF	Paul-José M'Poku	19 April 1992 (aged 27)	13	6	(Royal Belgian Football Association) Standard Liège
11	FW	Yannick Bolasie	24 June 1989 (aged 29)	37	9	(Royal Belgian Football Association) Anderlecht
12	DF	Wilfred Moke	12 February 1988 (aged 31)	6	0	(Turkish Football Federation) Ankaragücü
13	FW	Meschak Elia	6 August 1997 (aged 21)	18	6	(Congolese Association Football Federation) TP Mazembe
14	DF	Arthur Masuaku	7 November 1993 (aged 25)	3	1	(The Football Association) West Ham United
15	DF	Christian Luyindama	8 January 1994 (aged 25)	9	0	(Turkish Football Federation) Galatasaray
16	GK	Anthony Ngawi	15 May 1994 (aged 25)	5	0	(Swiss Football Association) Chiasso
17	FW	Cédric Bakambu	11 April 1991 (aged 28)	20	8	(Chinese Football Association) Beijing Sinobo Guoan
18	MF	Merveille Bokadi	21 May 1996 (aged 23)	20	1	(Royal Belgian Football Association) Standard Liège
19	FW	Britt Assombalonga	6 December 1992 (aged 26)	4	0	(The Football Association) Middlesbrough
20	MF	Jacques Maghoma	23 October 1987 (aged 31)	21	0	(The Football Association) Birmingham City
21	DF	Djuma Shabani	16 March 1993 (aged 26)	1	0	(Congolese Association Football Federation) AS Vita Club
22	DF	Chancel Mbemba	8 August 1994 (aged 24)	46	3	(Portuguese Football Federation) Porto
23	GK	Parfait Mandanda	10 November 1989 (aged 29)	15	0	(Romanian Football Federation) Dinamo București

=== Uganda ===
Head coach: (France) Sébastien Desabre

Uganda's 29-man preliminary squad was announced on 22 May 2019. The final squad was announced on 11 June.

No.	Pos.	Player	Date of birth (age)	Caps	Goals	Club
1	GK	Robert Odongkara	2 September 1989 (aged 29)	28	0	(Ethiopian Football Federation) Adama City
2	DF	Joseph Ochaya	14 December 1993 (aged 25)	46	2	(Congolese Association Football Federation) TP Mazembe
3	DF	Timothy Awany	6 August 1996 (aged 22)	21	0	(Federation of Uganda Football Associations) KCCA
4	DF	Murushid Juuko	14 April 1994 (aged 25)	33	1	(Tanzania Football Federation) Simba
5	DF	Bevis Mugabi	1 May 1995 (aged 24)	4	0	(The Football Association) Yeovil Town
6	MF	Taddeo Lwanga	21 May 1994 (aged 25)	11	0	(Federation of Uganda Football Associations) Vipers
7	FW	Emmanuel Okwi	25 December 1992 (aged 26)	63	20	(Tanzania Football Federation) Simba
8	MF	Khalid Aucho	8 August 1993 (aged 25)	41	2	(All India Football Federation) Churchill Brothers
9	FW	Patrick Kaddu	9 October 1995 (aged 23)	8	1	(Federation of Uganda Football Associations) KCCA
10	MF	Luwagga Kizito	20 December 1993 (aged 25)	37	1	(Kazakhstan Football Federation) Shakhter Karagandy
11	FW	Derrick Nsibambi	19 June 1994 (aged 25)	18	6	(Egyptian Football Association) Smouha
12	DF	Ronald Mukiibi	16 September 1991 (aged 27)	1	0	(Swedish Football Association) Östersunds FK
13	MF	Allan Kateregga	3 June 1994 (aged 25)	7	0	(South African Football Association) Maritzburg United
14	DF	Nicholas Wadada	27 July 1994 (aged 24)	50	1	(Tanzania Football Federation) Azam
15	DF	Godfrey Walusimbi	3 July 1989 (aged 29)	91	3	Unattached
16	MF	Hassan Wasswa	14 February 1988 (aged 31)	70	0	Unattached
17	MF	Farouk Miya	26 November 1997 (aged 21)	52	19	(Croatian Football Federation) Gorica
18	GK	Denis Onyango (captain)	15 May 1985 (aged 34)	71	0	(South African Football Association) Mamelodi Sundowns
19	GK	Jamal Salim	27 May 1995 (aged 24)	6	0	(Sudan Football Association) Al Hilal
20	DF	Isaac Muleme	10 October 1992 (aged 26)	34	0	(Football Association of the Czech Republic) Viktoria Žižkov
21	MF	Allan Kyambadde	15 January 1996 (aged 23)	14	0	(Federation of Uganda Football Associations) KCCA
22	FW	Lumala Abdu	21 July 1997 (aged 21)	2	0	(Swedish Football Association) Syrianska FC
23	MF	Micheal Azira	22 August 1987 (aged 31)	6	0	(Canadian Soccer Association) Montreal Impact

=== Zimbabwe ===
Head coach: Sunday Chidzambwa

Zimbabwe's 34-man preliminary squad was announced on 14 May 2019. The final squad was announced on 10 June. Tafadzwa Kutinyu withdrew injured and was replaced by Lawrence Mhlanga on 19 June.

No.	Pos.	Player	Date of birth (age)	Caps	Goals	Club
1	GK	Edmore Sibanda	2 January 1987 (aged 32)	13	0	(South African Football Association) Witbank Spurs
2	DF	Tendayi Darikwa	13 December 1991 (aged 27)	7	0	(The Football Association) Nottingham Forest
3	MF	Danny Phiri	22 April 1989 (aged 30)	38	2	(South African Football Association) Lamontville Golden Arrows
4	DF	Ronald Pfumbidzai	25 December 1994 (aged 24)	14	2	(South African Football Association) Bloemfontein Celtic
5	DF	Divine Lunga	28 May 1995 (aged 24)	9	0	(South African Football Association) Lamontville Golden Arrows
6	MF	Alec Mudimu	8 April 1995 (aged 24)	12	0	(Football Association of Wales) Cefn Druids
7	FW	Talent Chawapiwa	3 June 1992 (aged 27)	25	4	(South African Football Association) AmaZulu
8	MF	Marshall Munetsi	22 June 1996 (aged 22)	12	0	(South African Football Association) Orlando Pirates
9	FW	Evans Rusike	13 June 1991 (aged 28)	21	4	(South African Football Association) SuperSport United
10	MF	Ovidy Karuru	23 January 1989 (aged 30)	35	7	(South African Football Association) AmaZulu
11	MF	Khama Billiat	19 August 1990 (aged 28)	37	13	(South African Football Association) Kaizer Chiefs
12	DF	Jimmy Dzingai	21 November 1990 (aged 28)	5	0	(Football Association of Zambia) Power Dynamos
13	GK	Elvis Chipezeze	11 March 1990 (aged 29)	2	0	(South African Football Association) Baroka
14	FW	Tino Kadewere	5 January 1996 (aged 23)	13	2	(French Football Federation) Le Havre
15	DF	Teenage Hadebe	17 September 1995 (aged 23)	19	3	(South African Football Association) Kaizer Chiefs
16	GK	George Chigova	4 March 1991 (aged 28)	31	0	(South African Football Association) Polokwane City
17	FW	Knowledge Musona (captain)	21 June 1990 (aged 29)	36	21	(Royal Belgian Football Association) Sporting Lokeren
18	MF	Marvelous Nakamba	19 January 1994 (aged 25)	16	0	(Royal Belgian Football Association) Club Brugge
19	FW	Knox Mutizwa	12 October 1993 (aged 25)	15	5	(South African Football Association) Lamontville Golden Arrows
20	MF	Kudakwashe Mahachi	29 September 1993 (aged 25)	25	3	(South African Football Association) Orlando Pirates
21	MF	Thabani Kamusoko	2 March 1988 (aged 31)	9	0	(Tanzania Football Federation) Young Africans
22	DF	Lawrence Mhlanga	20 December 1993 (aged 25)	10	2	(Zimbabwe Football Association) FC Platinum
23	FW	Nyasha Mushekwi	21 August 1987 (aged 31)	18	4	(Chinese Football Association) Dalian Yifang

== Group B ==
=== Nigeria ===
Head coach: (Germany) Gernot Rohr

Nigeria's 31-man preliminary squad was announced on 14 May 2019. The final squad was announced on 10 June.

No.	Pos.	Player	Date of birth (age)	Caps	Goals	Club
1	GK	Ikechukwu Ezenwa	16 October 1988 (aged 30)	19	0	(Nigeria Football Federation) Enyimba Aba
2	DF	Ola Aina	8 October 1996 (aged 22)	8	0	(Italian Football Federation) Torino
3	DF	Jamilu Collins	5 August 1994 (aged 24)	7	0	(German Football Association) SC Paderborn
4	MF	Wilfred Ndidi	16 December 1996 (aged 22)	24	0	(The Football Association) Leicester City
5	DF	William Troost-Ekong	1 September 1993 (aged 25)	31	1	(Italian Football Federation) Udinese
6	DF	Leon Balogun	28 June 1988 (aged 30)	28	0	(The Football Association) Brighton & Hove Albion
7	FW	Ahmed Musa	14 October 1992 (aged 26)	80	15	(Saudi Arabian Football Federation) Al Nassr
8	MF	Peter Etebo	9 November 1995 (aged 23)	24	1	(The Football Association) Stoke City
9	FW	Odion Ighalo	16 June 1989 (aged 30)	27	11	(Chinese Football Association) Shanghai Shenhua
10	MF	John Obi Mikel (captain)	22 April 1987 (aged 32)	86	6	(The Football Association) Middlesbrough
11	FW	Henry Onyekuru	5 June 1997 (aged 22)	9	1	(Turkish Football Federation) Galatasaray
12	DF	Shehu Abdullahi	12 March 1993 (aged 26)	30	0	(Turkish Football Federation) Bursaspor
13	FW	Samuel Chukwueze	22 May 1999 (aged 20)	2	0	(Royal Spanish Football Federation) Villarreal
14	FW	Paul Onuachu	28 May 1994 (aged 25)	3	1	(Danish Football Association) Midtjylland
15	FW	Moses Simon	12 July 1995 (aged 23)	23	5	(Royal Spanish Football Federation) Levante
16	GK	Daniel Akpeyi	3 August 1986 (aged 32)	10	0	(South African Football Association) Kaizer Chiefs
17	FW	Samuel Kalu	26 August 1997 (aged 21)	6	1	(French Football Federation) Bordeaux
18	MF	Alex Iwobi	3 May 1996 (aged 23)	28	5	(The Football Association) Arsenal
19	MF	John Ogu	20 April 1988 (aged 31)	24	1	(Israel Football Association) Hapoel Be'er Sheva
20	DF	Chidozie Awaziem	1 January 1997 (aged 22)	5	1	(Turkish Football Federation) Çaykur Rizespor
21	FW	Victor Osimhen	29 December 1998 (aged 20)	3	0	(Royal Belgian Football Association) Sporting Charleroi
22	DF	Kenneth Omeruo	17 October 1993 (aged 25)	44	0	(Royal Spanish Football Federation) Leganés
23	GK	Francis Uzoho	28 October 1998 (aged 20)	13	0	(Cyprus Football Association) Anorthosis Famagusta

=== Guinea ===
Head coach: (Belgium) Paul Put

Guinea's 25-man preliminary squad was announced on 27 May 2019. The final squad was announced on 13 June. Baïssama Sankoh withdrew injured and was replaced by Lass Bangoura on 19 June.

No.	Pos.	Player	Date of birth (age)	Caps	Club
1	GK	Naby Yattara	12 January 1984 (aged 35)	60	(Réunion) Excelsior
2	FW	Mohamed Yattara	28 July 1993 (aged 25)	29	(France) Auxerre
3	DF	Issiaga Sylla	1 January 1994 (aged 25)	43	(France) Toulouse
4	MF	Amadou Diawara	17 July 1997 (aged 21)	4	(Italy) Napoli
5	DF	Ernest Seka	22 June 1987 (aged 31)	5	(France) Nancy
6	DF	Simon Falette	19 February 1992 (aged 27)	1	(Germany) Eintracht Frankfurt
7	MF	Mady Camara	28 February 1997 (aged 22)	5	(Greece) Olympiacos
8	MF	Naby Keïta (captain)	10 February 1995 (aged 24)	32	(England) Liverpool
9	FW	José Kanté	27 September 1990 (aged 28)	6	(Spain) Gimnàstic
10	FW	François Kamano	2 May 1996 (aged 23)	26	(France) Bordeaux
11	FW	Idrissa Sylla	3 December 1990 (aged 28)	26	(Belgium) Zulte Waregem
12	GK	Ibrahim Koné	5 December 1989 (aged 29)	1	(France) Pau
13	MF	Ibrahima Cissé	28 February 1994 (aged 25)	2	(England) Fulham
14	DF	Ousmane Sidibé	23 April 1985 (aged 34)	6	(France) Béziers
15	DF	Julian Jeanvier	31 March 1992 (aged 27)	0	(England) Brentford
16	FW	Ibrahima Traoré	21 April 1988 (aged 31)	44	(Germany) Borussia Mönchengladbach
17	MF	Boubacar Fofana	6 November 1989 (aged 29)	19	(Romania) Gaz Metan Mediaș
18	DF	Mikael Dyrestam	20 October 1991 (aged 27)	0	(Greece) Xanthi
19	FW	Bengali-Fodé Koita	21 October 1990 (aged 28)	0	(Turkey) Kasımpaşa
20	FW	Lass Bangoura	30 March 1992 (aged 27)	33	(Canada) Vancouver Whitecaps
21	FW	Sory Kaba	10 April 1995 (aged 24)	5	(France) Dijon
22	GK	Aly Keita	8 December 1986 (aged 32)	4	(Sweden) Östersunds FK
23	DF	Fodé Camara	17 April 1998 (aged 21)	1	(France) Gazélec Ajaccio

=== Madagascar ===
Head coach: (France) Nicolas Dupuis

Madagascar's 26-man preliminary squad was announced on 16 May 2019. The final squad was announced on 12 June.

No.	Pos.	Player	Date of birth (age)	Caps	Club
1	GK	Ibrahima Dabo	22 July 1992 (aged 26)	8	(Réunion) JS Saint-Pierroise
2	FW	Carolus Andriamatsinoro	6 July 1989 (aged 29)	25	(Saudi Arabia) Al-Adalah
3	FW	Baggio Rakotoarisoa	24 January 1994 (aged 25)	8	(Madagascar) Fosa Juniors FC
4	DF	Gervais Randrianarisoa	7 November 1984 (aged 34)	36	(Réunion) JS Saint-Pierroise
5	DF	Pascal Razakanantenaina	19 April 1987 (aged 32)	17	(Réunion) JS Saint-Pierroise
6	MF	Marco Ilaimaharitra	26 July 1995 (aged 23)	6	(Belgium) Charleroi
7	MF	Dimitry Caloin	8 May 1990 (aged 29)	3	(France) Les Herbiers
8	MF	Arohasina Andrianarimanana	16 August 1991 (aged 27)	11	(South Africa) Kaizer Chiefs
9	FW	Faneva Imà Andriatsima (captain)	3 June 1984 (aged 35)	36	(France) Clermont
10	FW	Njiva Rakotoharimalala	6 August 1992 (aged 26)	23	(Thailand) Samut Sakhon
11	FW	Paulin Voavy	10 November 1987 (aged 31)	38	(Egypt) Misr Lel Makkasa
12	MF	Lalaïna Nomenjanahary	1 June 1986 (aged 33)	33	(France) Paris FC
13	MF	Anicet Abel	13 March 1990 (aged 29)	7	(Bulgaria) Ludogorets Razgrad
14	DF	Jérémy Morel	2 April 1984 (aged 35)	2	(France) Lyon
15	MF	Ibrahim Amada	28 February 1990 (aged 29)	12	(Algeria) MC Alger
16	GK	Jean Dieu-Donné Randrianasolo	26 May 1989 (aged 30)	10	(Madagascar) CNaPS Sport
17	DF	Toavina Rambeloson	26 November 1992 (aged 26)	3	(France) Arras FA
18	MF	Rayan Raveloson	16 January 1997 (aged 22)	1	(France) Troyes
19	FW	William Gros	31 March 1992 (aged 27)	3	(France) Vitré
20	DF	Romain Métanire	28 March 1990 (aged 29)	4	(United States) Minnesota United
21	DF	Thomas Fontaine	8 May 1991 (aged 28)	8	(France) Reims
22	DF	Jérôme Mombris	27 November 1987 (aged 31)	7	(France) Grenoble
23	GK	Melvin Adrien	30 August 1993 (aged 25)	2	(France) FC Martigues

=== Burundi ===
Head coach: Olivier Niyungeko

Burundi's 26-man preliminary squad was announced on 14 May 2019. The final squad was announced on 12 June.

No.	Pos.	Player	Date of birth (age)	Caps	Club
1	GK	Jonathan Nahimana	12 December 1999 (aged 19)	16	(Burundi) TP Bata
2	MF	Enock Sabumukama	4 September 1994 (aged 24)	3	(Zambia) ZESCO United
3	FW	Elvis Kamsoba	27 June 1996 (aged 22)	0	(Australia) Melbourne Victory
4	MF	Pierre Kwizera	16 April 1991 (aged 28)	41	(Oman) Al-Orouba
5	MF	Gaël Bigirimana	22 October 1993 (aged 25)	6	(Scotland) Hibernian
6	DF	Karim Nizigiyimana	21 June 1989 (aged 30)	52	(Uganda) Vipers
7	FW	Fiston Abdul Razak	1 March 1993 (aged 26)	38	(Algeria) JS Kabylie
8	MF	Gaël Duhayindavyi	15 April 1990 (aged 29)	41	(Rwanda) Mukura
9	FW	Laudit Mavugo	10 October 1989 (aged 29)	19	(Zambia) NAPSA Stars
10	MF	Shassiri Nahimana	5 August 1993 (aged 25)	30	(Saudi Arabia) Al-Mujazzal
11	FW	Selemani Ndikumana (captain)	18 March 1987 (aged 32)	33	(Saudi Arabia) Al-Adalah
12	MF	Hussein Shabani	26 September 1990 (aged 28)	18	(Ethiopia) Ethiopian Coffee
13	GK	Justin Ndikumana	1 March 1993 (aged 26)	0	(Kenya) Sofapaka
14	DF	Omar Ngandu	3 October 1996 (aged 22)	6	(Rwanda) Kigali
15	DF	Omar Moussa	30 August 1997 (aged 21)	14	(Kenya) Sofapaka
16	DF	David Nshimirimana	2 January 1993 (aged 26)	26	(Rwanda) Mukura
17	FW	Cédric Amissi	20 March 1990 (aged 29)	39	(Saudi Arabia) Al-Taawoun
18	FW	Saido Berahino	4 August 1993 (aged 25)	5	(England) Stoke City
19	DF	Frédéric Nsabiyumva	26 April 1995 (aged 24)	25	(South Africa) Chippa United
20	FW	Francis Mustafa	3 May 1996 (aged 23)	0	(Kenya) Gor Mahia
21	FW	Mohamed Amissi	3 August 2000 (aged 18)	0	(Netherlands) NAC Breda
22	DF	Christophe Nduwarugira	22 June 1994 (aged 24)	26	(Portugal) Amora
23	GK	MacArthur Arakaza	27 July 1995 (aged 23)	28	(Kenya) Sofapaka

== Group C ==
=== Senegal ===
Head coach: Aliou Cissé

Senegal's 25-man preliminary squad was announced on 31 May 2019. The final squad was announced on 13 June.

No.	Pos.	Player	Date of birth (age)	Caps	Goals	Club
1	GK	Abdoulaye Diallo	30 March 1992 (aged 27)	17	0	(French Football Federation) Rennes
2	DF	Saliou Ciss	15 June 1989 (aged 30)	17	0	(French Football Federation) Valenciennes
3	DF	Kalidou Koulibaly	20 June 1991 (aged 28)	31	0	(Italian Football Federation) Napoli
4	DF	Pape Abou Cissé	14 September 1995 (aged 23)	3	1	(Hellenic Football Federation) Olympiacos
5	MF	Idrissa Gueye	26 September 1989 (aged 29)	57	2	(The Football Association) Everton
6	DF	Salif Sané	25 August 1990 (aged 28)	24	0	(German Football Association) Schalke 04
7	FW	Moussa Konaté	3 April 1993 (aged 26)	29	11	(French Football Federation) Amiens
8	MF	Cheikhou Kouyaté (captain)	21 December 1989 (aged 29)	47	2	(The Football Association) Crystal Palace
9	FW	M'Baye Niang	19 December 1994 (aged 24)	14	4	(French Football Federation) Rennes
10	FW	Sadio Mané	10 April 1992 (aged 27)	56	15	(The Football Association) Liverpool
11	FW	Keita Baldé	8 March 1995 (aged 24)	24	4	(Italian Football Federation) Internazionale
12	DF	Youssouf Sabaly	5 March 1993 (aged 26)	11	0	(French Football Federation) Bordeaux
13	MF	Alfred N'Diaye	6 March 1990 (aged 29)	25	0	(Royal Spanish Football Federation) Málaga
14	MF	Henri Saivet	26 October 1990 (aged 28)	20	1	(Turkish Football Federation) Bursaspor
15	FW	Krépin Diatta	25 February 1999 (aged 20)	2	0	(Royal Belgian Football Association) Club Brugge
16	GK	Edouard Mendy	1 March 1992 (aged 27)	2	0	(French Football Federation) Reims
17	MF	Badou Ndiaye	27 October 1990 (aged 28)	19	1	(Turkish Football Federation) Galatasaray
18	FW	Ismaïla Sarr	25 February 1998 (aged 21)	20	3	(French Football Federation) Rennes
19	FW	Mbaye Diagne	28 October 1991 (aged 27)	4	0	(Turkish Football Federation) Galatasaray
20	FW	Sada Thioub	1 June 1995 (aged 24)	2	0	(French Football Federation) Nîmes
21	DF	Lamine Gassama	20 October 1989 (aged 29)	35	0	(Turkish Football Federation) Göztepe
22	DF	Moussa Wagué	4 October 1998 (aged 20)	13	1	(Royal Spanish Football Federation) Barcelona
23	GK	Alfred Gomis	5 September 1993 (aged 25)	5	0	(Italian Football Federation) SPAL

=== Algeria ===
Head coach: Djamel Belmadi

Algeria's final squad was announced on 30 May 2019, with no preliminary squad released prior to it. Haris Belkebla was excluded from the squad for disciplinary reasons and was replaced by Andy Delort on 13 June.

No.	Pos.	Player	Date of birth (age)	Caps	Club
1	GK	Azzedine Doukha	5 August 1986 (aged 32)	13	(Saudi Arabia) Al-Raed
2	DF	Aïssa Mandi	22 October 1991 (aged 27)	43	(Spain) Real Betis
3	DF	Mehdi Tahrat	24 January 1990 (aged 29)	6	(France) Lens
4	DF	Djamel Benlamri	25 December 1989 (aged 29)	2	(Saudi Arabia) Al-Shabab
5	DF	Rafik Halliche	2 September 1986 (aged 32)	38	(Portugal) Moreirense
6	MF	Mohamed Fares	15 February 1996 (aged 23)	5	(Italy) SPAL
7	MF	Riyad Mahrez (captain)	21 February 1991 (aged 28)	44	(England) Manchester City
8	MF	Youcef Belaïli	14 March 1992 (aged 27)	5	(Tunisia) Espérance de Tunis
9	FW	Baghdad Bounedjah	30 November 1991 (age 34)	20	(Qatar) Al-Sadd
10	FW	Sofiane Feghouli	26 December 1989 (aged 29)	50	(Turkey) Galatasaray
11	MF	Yacine Brahimi	8 February 1990 (aged 29)	45	(Portugal) Porto
12	MF	Adam Ounas	11 November 1996 (aged 22)	5	(Italy) Napoli
13	FW	Islam Slimani	18 June 1988 (aged 31)	61	(Turkey) Fenerbahçe
14	MF	Hicham Boudaoui	23 September 1999 (aged 19)	2	(Algeria) Paradou AC
15	FW	Andy Delort	9 October 1991 (aged 27)	0	(France) Montpellier
16	GK	Alexandre Oukidja	19 July 1988 (aged 30)	1	(France) Metz
17	MF	Adlène Guedioura	12 November 1985 (aged 33)	41	(England) Nottingham Forest
18	DF	Mehdi Zeffane	19 May 1992 (aged 27)	11	(France) Rennes
19	MF	Mehdi Abeid	6 August 1992 (aged 26)	7	(France) Dijon
20	DF	Youcef Atal	17 May 1996 (aged 23)	7	(France) Nice
21	DF	Ramy Bensebaini	16 April 1995 (aged 24)	17	(France) Rennes
22	MF	Ismaël Bennacer	1 December 1997 (aged 21)	8	(Italy) Empoli
23	GK	Raïs M'Bolhi	25 April 1986 (aged 33)	59	(Saudi Arabia) Al-Ettifaq

=== Kenya ===
Head coach: (France) Sébastien Migné

Kenya's 30-man preliminary squad was announced on 14 May 2019. The final squad was announced on 11 June.

No.	Pos.	Player	Date of birth (age)	Caps	Club
1	GK	Farouk Shikalo	10 December 1996 (aged 22)	0	(Kenya) Bandari
2	DF	Joseph Okumu	26 May 1997 (aged 22)	1	(United States) Real Monarchs
3	DF	Aboud Omar	9 September 1992 (aged 26)	33	(Romania) Sepsi Sfântu Gheorghe
4	DF	Joash Onyango	31 January 1993 (aged 26)	5	(Kenya) Gor Mahia
5	DF	Musa Mohammed	6 June 1991 (aged 28)	35	(Zambia) Nkana
6	DF	Bernard Ochieng	25 January 1996 (aged 23)	2	(Kenya) Vihiga United
7	FW	Ayub Masika	10 September 1992 (aged 26)	16	(China) Beijing Renhe
8	MF	Johanna Omolo	31 July 1989 (aged 29)	21	(Belgium) Cercle Brugge
9	FW	John Avire	12 March 1997 (aged 22)	0	(Kenya) Sofapaka
10	FW	Eric Johana Omondi	8 November 1994 (aged 24)	23	(Sweden) Brommapojkarna
11	MF	Francis Kahata	4 July 1992 (aged 26)	32	(Kenya) Gor Mahia
12	MF	Victor Wanyama (captain)	25 June 1991 (aged 27)	53	(England) Tottenham Hotspur
13	DF	Erick Ouma Otieno	27 September 1996 (aged 22)	18	(Sweden) Vasalund
14	FW	Michael Olunga	26 March 1994 (aged 25)	31	(Japan) Kashiwa Reysol
15	DF	David Owino	5 April 1988 (aged 31)	52	(Zambia) ZESCO United
16	FW	Paul Were	8 October 1993 (aged 25)	32	(Greece) Trikala
17	MF	Ismael Athuman	1 February 1995 (aged 24)	9	(Spain) Las Palmas Atlético
18	GK	Patrick Matasi	11 December 1987 (aged 31)	19	(Ethiopia) Saint George
19	MF	Ovella Ochieng	23 December 1999 (aged 19)	15	(Sweden) Vasalund
20	DF	Philemon Otieno	18 October 1992 (aged 26)	6	(Kenya) Gor Mahia
21	MF	Dennis Odhiambo	18 March 1985 (aged 34)	27	(Kenya) Sofapaka
22	FW	Masoud Juma	3 February 1996 (aged 23)	6	(Libya) Al-Nasr
23	GK	John Oyemba	3 June 1993 (aged 26)	0	(Kenya) Kariobangi Sharks

=== Tanzania ===
Head coach: (Nigeria) Emmanuel Amunike

Tanzania's 39-man preliminary squad was announced on 2 May 2019. The final squad was announced on 13 June.

No.	Pos.	Player	Date of birth (age)	Caps	Goals	Club
1	GK	Aron Kalambo	13 July 1994 (aged 24)	0	0	(Tanzania Football Federation) Tanzania Prisons
2	DF	Gadiel Kamagi	12 September 1996 (aged 22)	21	0	(Tanzania Football Federation) Young Africans
3	MF	Feisal Salum	11 January 1998 (aged 21)	4	0	(Tanzania Football Federation) Young Africans
4	DF	Erasto Nyoni	7 May 1988 (aged 31)	79	5	(Tanzania Football Federation) Simba
5	DF	Kelvin Yondani	9 October 1984 (aged 34)	69	0	(Tanzania Football Federation) Young Africans
6	DF	David Mwantika	21 December 1988 (aged 30)	4	0	(Tanzania Football Federation) Azam
7	FW	Himid Mao	5 November 1992 (aged 26)	46	1	(Egyptian Football Association) Petrojet
8	MF	Frank Domayo	16 February 1993 (aged 26)	33	0	(Tanzania Football Federation) Azam
9	FW	Adi Yussuf	20 February 1992 (aged 27)	0	0	(The Football Association) Blackpool
10	FW	Mbwana Samatta (captain)	23 December 1992 (aged 26)	47	17	(Royal Belgian Football Association) Genk
11	FW	Thomas Ulimwengu	14 June 1993 (aged 26)	45	7	(Algerian Football Federation) JS Saoura
12	FW	Simon Msuva	2 October 1993 (aged 25)	48	8	(Royal Moroccan Football Federation) Difaâ El Jadidi
13	GK	Metacha Mnata	25 November 1998 (aged 20)	0	0	(Tanzania Football Federation) Mbao
14	FW	Raphael Bocco	5 August 1989 (aged 29)	61	14	(Tanzania Football Federation) Simba
15	DF	Mohamed Husseini	1 November 1996 (aged 22)	12	0	(Tanzania Football Federation) Simba
16	FW	Rashid Mandawa	5 May 1994 (aged 25)	5	0	(Botswana Football Association) Botswana Defence Force XI
17	FW	Faridi Mussa	21 June 1996 (aged 23)	18	0	(Royal Spanish Football Federation) Tenerife B
18	GK	Aishi Manula	13 September 1995 (aged 23)	28	0	(Tanzania Football Federation) Simba
19	DF	Vicent Philipo	1 February 1996 (aged 23)	0	0	(Tanzania Football Federation) Mbao
20	DF	Ally Mtoni	13 March 1993 (aged 26)	2	0	(Tanzania Football Federation) Lipuli
21	FW	Yahya Zayd	10 March 1998 (aged 21)	4	0	(Egyptian Football Association) Ismaily
22	MF	Hassan Kessy	25 December 1994 (aged 24)	8	0	(Football Association of Zambia) Nkana
23	MF	Mudathir Yahya	6 May 1996 (aged 23)	13	0	(Tanzania Football Federation) Azam

== Group D ==
=== Morocco ===
Head coach: (France) Hervé Renard

A 27-man provisional squad was announced on 27 May 2019. Anas Zniti replaced Abdelali Mhamdi on 5 June due to injury.

The final squad was announced on 11 June 2019. On 19 June 2019, it was announced that Abdelkrim Baadi will officially replace the injured Abderrazak Hamdallah.

No.	Pos.	Player	Date of birth (age)	Caps	Club
1	GK	Yassine Bounou	5 April 1991 (aged 28)	15	(Spain) Girona
2	DF	Achraf Hakimi	4 November 1998 (aged 20)	19	(Germany) Borussia Dortmund
3	DF	Noussair Mazraoui	14 November 1997 (aged 21)	4	(Netherlands) Ajax
4	DF	Manuel da Costa	6 May 1986 (aged 33)	36	(Saudi Arabia) Al-Ittihad
5	DF	Medhi Benatia (captain)	17 April 1987 (aged 32)	62	(Qatar) Al-Duhail
6	DF	Romain Saïss	26 March 1990 (aged 29)	33	(England) Wolverhampton Wanderers
7	MF	Hakim Ziyech	19 March 1993 (aged 26)	23	(Netherlands) Ajax
8	MF	Karim El Ahmadi	27 January 1985 (aged 34)	61	(Saudi Arabia) Al-Ittihad
9	FW	Sofiane Boufal	17 September 1993 (aged 25)	9	(Spain) Celta Vigo
10	FW	Younès Belhanda	25 February 1990 (aged 29)	53	(Turkey) Galatasaray
11	MF	Fayçal Fajr	1 August 1988 (aged 30)	31	(France) Caen
12	GK	Munir Mohand Mohamedi	10 May 1989 (aged 30)	34	(Spain) Málaga
13	FW	Khalid Boutaïb	24 April 1987 (aged 32)	22	(Egypt) Zamalek
14	MF	Mbark Boussoufa	15 August 1984 (aged 34)	66	(Saudi Arabia) Al-Shabab
15	MF	Youssef Aït Bennasser	7 July 1996 (aged 22)	19	(France) Saint-Étienne
16	FW	Nordin Amrabat	31 March 1987 (aged 32)	52	(Saudi Arabia) Al-Nassr
17	DF	Nabil Dirar	25 February 1986 (aged 33)	39	(Turkey) Fenerbahçe
18	MF	Mehdi Bourabia	8 July 1991 (aged 27)	3	(Italy) Sassuolo
19	FW	Youssef En-Nesyri	1 June 1997 (aged 22)	22	(Spain) Leganés
20	FW	Oussama Idrissi	26 February 1996 (aged 23)	2	(Netherlands) AZ
21	DF	Yunis Abdelhamid	28 September 1987 (aged 31)	4	(France) Reims
22	GK	Ahmed Reda Tagnaouti	5 April 1996 (aged 23)	2	(Morocco) Wydad Casablanca
23	DF	Abdelkrim Baadi	14 April 1996 (aged 23)	2	(Morocco) Hassania Agadir

=== Ivory Coast ===
Head coach: Ibrahim Kamara

No.	Pos.	Player	Date of birth (age)	Caps	Club
1	GK	Ira Eliezer Tapé	31 August 1997 (aged 21)	0	(Ivory Coast) San Pedro
2	DF	Wonlo Coulibaly	22 December 1991 (aged 27)	1	(Ivory Coast) ASEC Mimosas
3	DF	Souleyman Doumbia	24 September 1996 (aged 22)	0	(France) Rennes
4	DF	Jean-Philippe Gbamin	25 September 1995 (aged 23)	6	(Germany) Mainz 05
5	DF	Wilfried Kanon	6 July 1993 (aged 25)	35	(Netherlands) ADO Den Haag
6	DF	Ismaël Traoré	18 August 1986 (aged 32)	5	(France) Angers
7	MF	Victorien Angban	29 September 1996 (aged 22)	8	(France) Metz
8	MF	Franck Kessié	19 December 1996 (aged 22)	28	(Italy) Milan
9	FW	Wilfried Zaha	10 November 1992 (aged 26)	9	(England) Crystal Palace
10	MF	Jean Michaël Seri	19 July 1991 (aged 27)	23	(England) Fulham
11	FW	Maxwel Cornet	27 September 1996 (aged 22)	10	(France) Lyon
12	FW	Wilfried Bony	10 December 1988 (aged 30)	52	(Qatar) Al-Arabi
13	FW	Roger Assalé	13 November 1993 (aged 25)	14	(Switzerland) Young Boys
14	FW	Jonathan Kodjia	22 October 1989 (aged 29)	17	(England) Aston Villa
15	FW	Max Gradel	30 November 1987 (aged 31)	65	(France) Toulouse
16	GK	Sylvain Gbohouo	29 October 1988 (aged 30)	40	(Democratic Republic of the Congo) Mazembe
17	DF	Serge Aurier (captain)	24 December 1992 (aged 26)	52	(England) Tottenham Hotspur
18	MF	Ibrahim Sangaré	2 December 1997 (aged 21)	2	(France) Toulouse
19	FW	Nicolas Pépé	20 May 1995 (aged 24)	11	(France) Lille
20	MF	Serey Dié	7 November 1984 (aged 34)	44	(Switzerland) Neuchâtel Xamax
21	DF	Cheick Comara	14 October 1993 (aged 25)	9	(Morocco) Wydad Casablanca
22	DF	Mamadou Bagayoko	31 December 1989 (aged 29)	8	(France) Red Star
23	GK	Badra Ali Sangaré	30 May 1986 (aged 33)	13	(South Africa) Free State Stars

=== South Africa ===
Head coach: (England) Stuart Baxter

A 23-man final squad was announced on 9 June 2019.

No.	Pos.	Player	Date of birth (age)	Caps	Club
1	GK	Darren Keet	5 August 1989 (aged 29)	9	(South Africa) Bidvest Wits
2	DF	Buhle Mkhwanazi	1 February 1990 (aged 29)	15	(South Africa) Bidvest Wits
3	DF	Innocent Maela	14 August 1992 (aged 26)	3	(South Africa) Orlando Pirates
4	DF	Daniel Cardoso	6 October 1988 (aged 30)	1	(South Africa) Kaizer Chiefs
5	DF	Thamsanqa Mkhize	18 August 1988 (aged 30)	6	(South Africa) Cape Town City
6	DF	Ramahlwe Mphahlele	1 February 1990 (aged 29)	14	(South Africa) Kaizer Chiefs
7	FW	Lebohang Maboe	17 September 1994 (aged 24)	7	(South Africa) Mamelodi Sundowns
8	MF	Bongani Zungu	9 October 1992 (aged 26)	24	(France) Amiens
9	FW	Lebo Mothiba	28 January 1996 (aged 23)	7	(France) Strasbourg
10	MF	Thulani Serero	4 November 1990 (aged 28)	40	(Netherlands) Vitesse
11	MF	Themba Zwane	3 August 1989 (aged 29)	16	(South Africa) Mamelodi Sundowns
12	MF	Kamohelo Mokotjo	11 March 1991 (aged 28)	15	(England) Brentford
13	MF	Samuel Mabunda	17 April 1988 (aged 31)	9	(South Africa) Mamelodi Sundowns
14	DF	Thulani Hlatshwayo (captain)	18 December 1989 (aged 29)	40	(South Africa) Bidvest Wits
15	MF	Dean Furman	22 June 1988 (aged 30)	49	(South Africa) SuperSport United
16	GK	Bruce Bvuma	13 May 1995 (aged 24)	0	(South Africa) Kaizer Chiefs
17	MF	Sibusiso Vilakazi	29 December 1989 (aged 29)	32	(South Africa) Mamelodi Sundowns
18	DF	Sifiso Hlanti	1 May 1990 (aged 29)	13	(South Africa) Bidvest Wits
19	FW	Percy Tau	13 May 1994 (aged 25)	18	(Belgium) Union Saint-Gilloise
20	MF	Hlompho Kekana	23 May 1985 (aged 34)	26	(South Africa) Mamelodi Sundowns
21	FW	Lars Veldwijk	21 August 1991 (aged 27)	2	(Netherlands) Sparta Rotterdam
22	GK	Ronwen Williams	21 January 1992 (aged 27)	5	(South Africa) SuperSport United
23	FW	Thembinkosi Lorch	22 July 1993 (aged 25)	4	(South Africa) Orlando Pirates

=== Namibia ===
Head coach: Ricardo Mannetti

A 23-man final squad was announced on 10 June 2019.

No.	Pos.	Player	Date of birth (age)	Caps	Club
1	GK	Maximilian Mbaeva	14 April 1989 (aged 30)	21	(South Africa) Golden Arrows
2	DF	Denzil Hoaseb	25 February 1991 (aged 28)	57	(South Africa) Highlands Park
3	DF	Ananias Gebhardt	8 September 1988 (aged 30)	42	(South Africa) Baroka
4	DF	Riaan Hanamub	8 February 1995 (aged 24)	19	(South Africa) Jomo Cosmos
5	DF	Charles Hambira	3 June 1990 (aged 29)	12	(Namibia) Tura Magic
6	MF	Larry Horaeb	12 November 1991 (aged 27)	44	(Namibia) Tura Magic
7	MF	Hotto Kavendji	29 October 1991 (aged 27)	44	(South Africa) Bidvest Wits
8	MF	Willy Stephanus	26 June 1991 (aged 27)	44	(Zambia) Lusaka Dynamos
9	FW	Benson Shilongo	18 May 1992 (aged 27)	26	(Egypt) Ismaily
10	FW	Manfred Starke	21 February 1991 (aged 28)	3	(Germany) Carl Zeiss Jena
11	MF	Absalom Iimbondi	11 October 1991 (aged 27)	23	(Namibia) United Africa Tigers
12	MF	Ronald Ketjijere (captain)	12 December 1987 (aged 31)	64	(Namibia) African Stars
13	FW	Peter Shalulile	23 March 1993 (aged 26)	27	(South Africa) Highlands Park
14	MF	Joslin Kamatuka	22 July 1991 (aged 27)	7	(South Africa) Cape Umoya United
15	MF	Marcel Papama	28 April 1996 (aged 23)	5	(Namibia) African Stars
16	GK	Ratanda Mbazuvara	15 August 1989 (aged 29)	1	(Namibia) African Stars
17	FW	Itamunua Keimuine	1 May 1993 (aged 26)	28	(Ethiopia) Dire Dawa City
18	FW	Isaskar Gurirab	3 January 1998 (aged 21)	2	(Namibia) Life Fighters
19	MF	Petrus Shitembi	11 May 1992 (aged 27)	61	(Zambia) Lusaka Dynamos
20	DF	Ivan Kamberipa	3 February 1994 (aged 25)	2	(Namibia) African Stars
21	MF	Dynamo Fredericks	4 April 1992 (aged 27)	21	(Namibia) Black Africa
22	DF	Ryan Nyambe	4 December 1997 (aged 21)	0	(England) Blackburn Rovers
23	GK	Lloyd Kazapua	25 March 1989 (aged 30)	14	(South Africa) Maccabi

== Group E ==
=== Tunisia ===
Head coach: (France) Alain Giresse

The following players were called up for the 2019 Africa Cup of Nations.

No.	Pos.	Player	Date of birth (age)	Caps	Club
1	GK	Farouk Ben Mustapha	1 July 1989 (aged 29)	24	(Saudi Arabia) Al-Shabab
2	DF	Wajdi Kechrida	5 November 1995 (aged 23)	1	(Tunisia) Étoile du Sahel
3	DF	Dylan Bronn	19 June 1995 (aged 24)	11	(Belgium) Gent
4	DF	Yassine Meriah	2 July 1993 (aged 25)	28	(Greece) Olympiacos
5	DF	Oussama Haddadi	28 January 1992 (aged 27)	15	(France) Dijon
6	DF	Rami Bedoui	19 January 1990 (aged 29)	14	(Saudi Arabia) Al-Fayha
7	FW	Youssef Msakni (captain)	28 October 1990 (aged 28)	49	(Belgium) Eupen
8	FW	Firas Chaouat	8 May 1996 (aged 23)	4	(Tunisia) CS Sfaxien
9	FW	Anice Badri	18 September 1990 (aged 28)	15	(Tunisia) Espérance de Tunis
10	FW	Wahbi Khazri	8 February 1991 (aged 28)	43	(France) Saint-Étienne
11	FW	Taha Yassine Khenissi	6 January 1992 (aged 27)	23	(Tunisia) Espérance de Tunis
12	DF	Karim Aouadhi	2 May 1988 (aged 31)	10	(Tunisia) Étoile du Sahel
13	MF	Ferjani Sassi	18 March 1992 (aged 27)	45	(Egypt) Zamalek
14	DF	Mohamed Dräger	25 June 1996 (aged 22)	4	(Germany) Paderborn 07
15	MF	Marc Lamti	28 January 2001 (aged 18)	1	(Germany) Bayer Leverkusen
16	GK	Mouez Hassen	5 March 1995 (aged 24)	5	(France) Nice
17	MF	Ellyes Skhiri	10 May 1995 (aged 24)	14	(France) Montpellier
18	MF	Bassem Srarfi	25 June 1997 (aged 21)	12	(France) Nice
19	DF	Ayman Ben Mohamed	8 December 1994 (aged 24)	2	(Tunisia) Espérance de Tunis
20	MF	Ghailene Chaalali	28 February 1994 (aged 25)	8	(Tunisia) Espérance de Tunis
21	DF	Nassim Hnid	12 March 1997 (aged 22)	1	(Tunisia) CS Sfaxien
22	GK	Moez Ben Cherifia	24 June 1991 (aged 27)	17	(Tunisia) Espérance de Tunis
23	FW	Naïm Sliti	27 July 1992 (aged 26)	30	(France) Dijon

=== Mali ===
Head coach: Mohamed Magassouba

The final squad was announced on 15 June 2019. Two players named Adama Traoré were selected; to avoid confusion, the older player from US Orléans was widely known as Adama Traoré I and the younger of Cercle Brugge as Adama Traoré II.

No.	Pos.	Player	Date of birth (age)	Caps	Club
1	GK	Ibrahim Mounkoro	23 February 1990 (aged 29)	0	(Democratic Republic of the Congo) TP Mazembe
2	DF	Hamari Traoré	27 January 1992 (aged 27)	18	(France) Rennes
3	DF	Youssouf Koné	5 July 1995 (aged 23)	12	(France) Lille
4	MF	Amadou Haidara	31 January 1998 (aged 21)	6	(Germany) RB Leipzig
5	DF	Kiki Kouyaté	15 April 1997 (aged 22)	1	(France) Troyes
6	DF	Massadio Haïdara	2 December 1992 (aged 26)	1	(France) Lens
7	MF	Moussa Doumbia	15 August 1994 (aged 24)	17	(France) Reims
8	MF	Diadie Samassékou	11 January 1996 (aged 23)	8	(Austria) Red Bull Salzburg
9	FW	Moussa Marega	14 April 1991 (aged 28)	20	(Portugal) Porto
10	FW	Kalifa Coulibaly	21 August 1991 (aged 27)	14	(France) Nantes
11	MF	Lassana Coulibaly	10 April 1996 (aged 23)	14	(Scotland) Rangers
12	FW	Sékou Koïta	28 November 1999 (aged 19)	0	(Austria) Wolfsberg
13	DF	Molla Wagué	21 February 1991 (aged 28)	30	(England) Nottingham Forest
14	MF	Adama Traoré I	5 June 1995 (aged 24)	19	(France) Orléans
15	DF	Mamadou Fofana	21 January 1998 (aged 21)	9	(France) Metz
16	GK	Djigui Diarra	27 February 1995 (aged 24)	25	(Mali) Stade Malien
17	DF	Falaye Sacko	1 May 1995 (aged 24)	8	(Portugal) Vitória de Guimarães
18	MF	Cheick Doucouré	8 January 2000 (aged 19)	2	(France) Lens
19	MF	Moussa Djenepo	15 June 1998 (aged 21)	9	(Belgium) Standard Liège
20	FW	Adama Niane	16 June 1993 (aged 26)	5	(Belgium) Charleroi
21	MF	Adama Traoré II	28 June 1995 (aged 23)	8	(Belgium) Cercle Brugge
22	GK	Adama Kéïta	3 May 1990 (aged 29)	1	(Mali) Djoliba
23	FW	Abdoulay Diaby (captain)	21 May 1991 (aged 28)	17	(Portugal) Sporting CP

=== Mauritania ===
Head coach: (France) Corentin Martins

No.	Pos.	Player	Date of birth (age)	Caps	Club
1	GK	Brahim Souleymane	30 December 1986 (aged 32)	23	(Mauritania) ACS Ksar
2	DF	Moustapha Diaw	31 December 1996 (aged 22)	28	(Mauritania) Tevragh-Zeïna
3	DF	Aly Abeid	11 December 1997 (aged 21)	28	(Spain) Alcorcón
4	DF	Harouna Abou Demba	31 December 1991 (aged 27)	8	(France) Grenoble
5	DF	Abdoul Ba (captain)	8 February 1994 (aged 25)	28	(France) Auxerre
6	MF	Khassa Camara	22 October 1992 (aged 26)	31	(Greece) Xanthi
7	FW	Ismaël Diakité	13 December 1991 (aged 27)	42	(Tunisia) US Tataouine
8	MF	Diallo Guidilèye	30 December 1989 (aged 29)	22	(Turkey) Elazığspor
9	FW	Hemeya Tanjy	1 May 1998 (aged 21)	6	(Mauritania) Nouadhibou
10	FW	Adama Ba	27 August 1993 (aged 25)	23	(Turkey) Giresunspor
11	FW	Bessam	5 December 1987 (aged 31)	47	(Tunisia) AS Gabès
12	MF	Alassane Diop	22 September 1997 (aged 21)	7	(Saudi Arabia) Hajer
13	DF	Sally Sarr	6 May 1986 (aged 33)	12	(Switzerland) Servette
14	MF	Mohamed Yali	1 November 1997 (aged 21)	31	(Algeria) DRB Tadjenanet
15	DF	Bakary N'Diaye	26 November 1998 (aged 20)	16	(Morocco) Difaâ El Jadidi
16	GK	Namori Diaw	30 December 1991 (aged 27)	2	(Mauritania) ASC Kédia
17	FW	Souleymane Anne	5 December 1997 (aged 21)	1	(France) Aurillac Arpajon
18	MF	Moctar Sidi El Hacen	31 December 1997 (aged 21)	35	(Spain) Valladolid
19	MF	Ibréhima Coulibaly	30 July 1989 (aged 29)	1	(France) Grenoble
20	DF	Abdoulkader Thiam	3 October 1998 (aged 20)	3	(France) Orléans
21	DF	Diadié Diarra	23 January 1993 (aged 26)	4	(France) Sedan
22	GK	Babacar Diop	17 September 1995 (aged 23)	1	(Mauritania) ASC Police
23	MF	Silèye Gaye	13 September 1991 (aged 27)	41	(Mauritania) Nouadhibou

=== Angola ===
Head coach: (Serbia) Srđan Vasiljević

A 23-man final squad was announced on 12 June 2019.

No.	Pos.	Player	Date of birth (age)	Caps	Club
1	GK	Ndulo	1 June 1996 (aged 23)	1	(Angola) Académica do Lobito
2	DF	Bruno Gaspar	21 April 1993 (age 33)	0	(Portugal) Sporting CP
3	DF	Jonathan Buatu	27 September 1993 (aged 25)	15	(Portugal) Rio Ave
4	MF	Show	6 March 1999 (aged 20)	10	(Angola) 1° de Agosto
5	DF	Dani Massunguna	1 May 1986 (aged 33)	46	(Angola) 1° de Agosto
6	DF	Wilson Gaspar	29 September 1990 (aged 28)	13	(Angola) Petro de Luanda
7	FW	Djalma	30 May 1987 (aged 32)	46	(Turkey) Alanyaspor
8	DF	Paizo	10 May 1992 (aged 27)	9	(Angola) 1° de Agosto
9	FW	Fredy Kulembé	27 March 1990 (aged 29)	21	(Turkey) Antalyaspor
10	FW	Gelson Dala	13 July 1996 (aged 22)	22	(Portugal) Rio Ave
11	FW	Geraldo	23 November 1991 (aged 27)	20	(Egypt) Al Ahly
12	GK	Tony Cabaça	23 April 1986 (aged 33)	1	(Angola) 1° de Agosto
13	MF	José Macaia	24 March 1994 (aged 25)	0	(Angola) 1° de Agosto
14	FW	Mabululu	10 September 1989 (aged 29)	7	(Angola) 1° de Agosto
15	DF	Bastos	23 November 1991 (aged 27)	44	(Italy) Lazio
16	MF	Stélvio	24 January 1989 (aged 30)	10	(Luxembourg) Dudelange
17	FW	Mateus (captain)	19 June 1984 (aged 35)	59	(Portugal) Boavista
18	MF	Herenilson	26 August 1996 (aged 22)	22	(Angola) Petro de Luanda
19	FW	Evandro Brandão	7 May 1991 (aged 28)	1	(Portugal) Leixoes S.C.
20	FW	Wilson Eduardo	8 July 1990 (aged 28)	1	(Portugal) Braga
21	DF	Isaac Costa	25 April 1991 (aged 28)	17	(Angola) 1° de Agosto
22	GK	Landú	4 January 1990 (aged 29)	34	(Angola) Interclube
23	DF	Eddie Afonso	7 March 1994 (aged 25)	11	(Angola) Petro de Luanda

== Group F ==
=== Cameroon ===
Head coach: (Netherlands) Clarence Seedorf

A 34-man provisional squad was announced on 10 May 2019. On 15 May, Jean-Charles Castelletto, Tristan Dingomé, Stève Mvoué were added to the provisional squad. The list was reduced to 29 names on 10 June 2019.

The final squad was announced on 11 June 2019.

No.	Pos.	Player	Date of birth (age)	Caps	Club
1	GK	André Onana	2 April 1996 (aged 23)	9	(Netherlands) Ajax
2	DF	Collins Fai	23 November 1992 (aged 26)	23	(Belgium) Standard Liège
3	DF	Gaëtan Bong	25 April 1988 (aged 31)	15	(England) Brighton & Hove Albion
4	DF	Banana Yaya	29 July 1991 (aged 27)	11	(Greece) Panionios
5	DF	Michael Ngadeu-Ngadjui	23 November 1990 (aged 28)	25	(Czech Republic) Slavia Prague
6	DF	Ambroise Oyongo	22 June 1991 (aged 27)	37	(France) Montpellier
7	FW	Clinton N'Jie	15 August 1993 (aged 25)	25	(France) Marseille
8	MF	André-Frank Zambo Anguissa	16 November 1995 (aged 23)	16	(England) Fulham
9	FW	Stéphane Bahoken	28 May 1992 (aged 27)	5	(France) Angers
10	MF	Arnaud Djoum	2 May 1989 (aged 30)	19	(Scotland) Heart of Midlothian
11	FW	Christian Bassogog	18 October 1995 (aged 23)	21	(China) Henan Jianye
12	DF	Joyskim Dawa	9 April 1996 (aged 23)	1	(Ukraine) Mariupol
13	FW	Eric Maxim Choupo-Moting (captain)	23 March 1989 (aged 30)	50	(France) Paris Saint-Germain
14	MF	Georges Mandjeck	9 December 1988 (aged 30)	46	(Israel) Maccabi Haifa
15	MF	Pierre Kunde	26 July 1995 (aged 23)	6	(Germany) Mainz 05
16	GK	Fabrice Ondoa	24 December 1995 (aged 23)	40	(Belgium) Oostende
17	FW	Karl Toko Ekambi	14 September 1992 (aged 26)	22	(Spain) Villarreal
18	FW	Joel Tagueu	6 November 1993 (aged 25)	4	(Portugal) Marítimo
19	FW	Jacques Zoua	6 September 1991 (aged 27)	24	(Romania) Astra Giurgiu
20	MF	Olivier Boumal	17 September 1989 (aged 29)	3	(Greece) Panionios
21	MF	Wilfrid Kaptoum	7 July 1996 (aged 22)	0	(Spain) Real Betis
22	DF	Jean-Armel Kana-Biyik	3 July 1989 (aged 29)	6	(Turkey) Kayserispor
23	GK	Carlos Kameni	18 February 1984 (aged 35)	70	(Turkey) Fenerbahçe

=== Ghana ===
Head coach: James Kwesi Appiah

The final squad was announced on 10 June 2019.

No.	Pos.	Player	Date of birth (age)	Caps	Club
1	GK	Richard Ofori	1 November 1993 (aged 25)	15	(South Africa) Maritzburg United
2	DF	Joseph Larweh Attamah	22 May 1994 (aged 25)	5	(Turkey) İstanbul Başakşehir
3	FW	Asamoah Gyan	22 November 1985 (aged 33)	106	(Turkey) Kayserispor
4	DF	Jonathan Mensah	13 July 1990 (aged 28)	61	(United States) Columbus Crew
5	MF	Thomas Partey	13 June 1993 (aged 26)	21	(Spain) Atlético Madrid
6	MF	Afriyie Acquah	5 January 1992 (aged 27)	34	(Italy) Empoli
7	FW	Christian Atsu	10 January 1992 (aged 27)	61	(England) Newcastle United
8	FW	Owusu Kwabena	18 June 1997 (aged 22)	0	(Spain) Salamanca
9	FW	Jordan Ayew	11 September 1991 (aged 27)	53	(England) Crystal Palace
10	FW	André Ayew (captain)	17 December 1989 (aged 29)	81	(Turkey) Fenerbahçe
11	MF	Mubarak Wakaso	25 July 1990 (aged 28)	54	(Spain) Alavés
12	GK	Lawrence Ati-Zigi	29 November 1996 (aged 22)	3	(France) Sochaux
13	FW	Caleb Ekuban	23 March 1994 (aged 25)	2	(Turkey) Trabzonspor
14	DF	Lumor Agbenyenu	15 August 1996 (aged 22)	12	(Turkey) Göztepe
15	DF	Kasim Nuhu	22 June 1995 (aged 23)	6	(Germany) 1899 Hoffenheim
16	GK	Felix Annan	22 November 1994 (aged 24)	1	(Ghana) Asante Kotoko
17	DF	Baba Rahman	2 July 1994 (aged 24)	24	(France) Reims
18	DF	Joseph Aidoo	29 September 1995 (aged 23)	1	(Belgium) Genk
19	MF	Samuel Owusu	28 March 1996 (aged 23)	0	(Serbia) Čukarički
20	MF	Kwadwo Asamoah	9 December 1988 (aged 30)	71	(Italy) Internazionale
21	DF	John Boye	23 April 1987 (aged 32)	64	(France) Metz
22	DF	Andy Yiadom	2 December 1991 (aged 27)	5	(England) Reading
23	FW	Thomas Agyepong	10 October 1996 (aged 22)	5	(Scotland) Hibernian

=== Benin ===
Head coach: (France) Michel Dussuyer

On 22 May 2019, Benin announced their final 23-man squad.

No.	Pos.	Player	Date of birth (age)	Caps	Club
1	GK	Fabien Farnolle	5 February 1985 (aged 34)	23	(Turkey) Malatyaspor
2	DF	Séidou Barazé	20 October 1990 (aged 28)	16	(France) Yzeure
3	DF	Khaled Adénon	28 July 1985 (aged 33)	59	(France) Amiens
4	MF	Tidjani Anaane	27 March 1997 (aged 22)	1	(Tunisia) Ben Guerdane
5	DF	Junior Salomon	8 April 1986 (aged 33)	21	(Nigeria) Plateau United
6	DF	Olivier Verdon	5 October 1995 (aged 23)	10	(France) Sochaux-Montbéliard
7	FW	David Djigla	23 August 1995 (aged 23)	19	(France) Niort
8	MF	Jordan Adéoti	12 March 1989 (aged 30)	22	(France) Auxerre
9	FW	Steve Mounié	29 September 1994 (aged 24)	14	(England) Huddersfield Town
10	FW	Mickaël Poté	24 September 1984 (aged 34)	46	(Turkey) Adana Demirspor
11	DF	Emmanuel Imorou	16 September 1988 (aged 30)	12	(France) Caen
12	DF	David Kiki	25 November 1993 (aged 25)	18	(France) Brest
13	DF	Moise Adilehou	1 November 1995 (aged 23)	3	(Greece) Levadiakos
14	FW	Cebio Soukou	2 October 1992 (aged 26)	1	(Germany) Hansa Rostock
15	MF	Sessi D'Almeida	20 November 1995 (aged 23)	5	(England) Yeovil Town
16	GK	Saturnin Allagbé	22 November 1993 (aged 25)	13	(France) Niort
17	MF	Stéphane Sessègnon (captain)	1 June 1984 (aged 35)	73	(Turkey) Gençlerbirliği
18	MF	Mama Séïbou	28 December 1995 (aged 23)	22	(France) SC Toulon
19	FW	Segbé Azankpo	6 May 1993 (aged 26)	6	(Slovakia) FK Senica
20	FW	Jodel Dossou	17 March 1992 (aged 27)	24	(Liechtenstein) Vaduz
21	MF	Rodrigue Kossi	11 July 2000 (aged 18)	0	(Tunisia) Club Africain
22	DF	Rodrigue Fassinou	22 May 1999 (aged 20)	11	(Benin) ASPAC
23	GK	Chérif Dine Kakpo	1 December 1997 (aged 21)	0	(Benin) Buffles

=== Guinea-Bissau ===
Head coach: Baciro Candé

Guinea-Bissau's 29-man preliminary squad was announced on 3 June 2019. The final squad was announced on 12 June.

No.	Pos.	Player	Date of birth (age)	Caps	Goals	Club
1	GK	Jonas Mendes	20 November 1989 (aged 29)	29	0	(Portuguese Football Federation) Académico de Viseu
2	DF	Eliseu Cassamá	6 February 1994 (aged 25)	6	0	(Portuguese Football Federation) Rio Ave
3	MF	Burá	22 December 1995 (aged 23)	2	0	(Portuguese Football Federation) Desportivo das Aves
4	DF	Marcelo Djaló	8 October 1993 (aged 25)	0	0	(The Football Association) Fulham
5	DF	Rudinilson Silva	20 August 1994 (aged 24)	14	0	(Lithuanian Football Federation) Kauno Žalgiris
6	DF	Tomás Dabó	20 October 1993 (aged 25)	6	0	(Italian Football Federation) Rieti
7	MF	Zezinho (captain)	23 September 1992 (aged 26)	30	2	(Slovak Football Association) Senica
8	MF	João Jaquité	22 February 1996 (aged 23)	1	0	(Portuguese Football Federation) Tondela
9	FW	Romário Baldé	25 December 1996 (aged 22)	0	0	(Portuguese Football Federation) Académica de Coimbra
10	MF	Pelé	29 September 1991 (aged 27)	6	0	(The Football Association) Nottingham Forest
11	FW	Jorginho	21 September 1995 (aged 23)	4	0	(Bulgarian Football Union) CSKA Sofia
12	GK	Rui Dabó	5 October 1994 (aged 24)	1	0	(Portuguese Football Federation) Fabril Barreiro
13	FW	Frédéric Mendy	18 September 1988 (aged 30)	11	4	(Portuguese Football Federation) Vitória de Setúbal
14	DF	Juary Soares	20 February 1992 (aged 27)	14	1	(Portuguese Football Federation) Mafra
15	FW	Toni Silva	15 September 1993 (aged 25)	12	2	(Egyptian Football Association) Al Ittihad
16	MF	Moreto Cassamá	16 February 1998 (aged 21)	0	0	(French Football Federation) Reims
17	FW	Mama Baldé	6 November 1995 (aged 23)	0	0	(Portuguese Football Federation) Desportivo das Aves
18	FW	Piqueti	12 February 1993 (aged 26)	15	3	(Saudi Arabian Football Federation) Al Shoulla
19	FW	Joseph Mendes	30 March 1991 (aged 28)	0	0	(French Football Federation) Ajaccio
20	MF	Sori Mané	3 April 1996 (aged 23)	7	0	(Portuguese Football Federation) Cova da Piedade
21	DF	Nanú	17 May 1994 (aged 25)	0	0	(Portuguese Football Federation) Marítimo
22	DF	Mamadu Candé	29 August 1990 (aged 28)	14	0	(Portuguese Football Federation) Santa Clara
23	GK	Edimar Cá	14 August 2000 (aged 18)	0	0	(Football Federation of Guinea-Bissau) UDIB

== Player representation ==
=== Player representation by league system ===
Country	Players	Percentage	Outside national squad
France	87	15.76%	87
South Africa	46	8.3%	29
England	43	7.8%	43
Turkey	29	5.3%	29
Portugal	27	4.9%	27
Egypt	24	4.3%	9
Belgium	20	3.6%	20
Spain	20	3.6%	20
Tanzania	18	3.3%	4
Saudi Arabia	17	3.1%	17
Others	221	40.04%	153
**Total**	552	100%	416

=== By club ===
Clubs with 5 or more players represented are listed.

=== Player representation by club ===
Players	Club
8	1º de Agosto
7	Rennes, Kaizer Chiefs
6	TP Mazembe, Zamalek, Reims, Mamelodi Sundowns, Simba FC, Espérance de Tunis, Galatasaray
5	Al Ahly, Pyramids, Sofapaka, Bidvest Wits

=== By club nationality ===
Players	CAF clubs
46	South Africa
24	Egypt
18	Tanzania
14	Tunisia
13	Angola
12	Kenya
9	Namibia
8	(Democratic Republic of the Congo) DR Congo, Zambia
6	Mauritania
5	Algeria, Morocco, Uganda
4	Ethiopia, Réunion
3	Rwanda
2	Benin, Ivory Coast, Madagascar, Mali, Nigeria
1	Botswana, Burundi, Ghana, Guinea-Bissau, Libya, Sudan, Zimbabwe

Players	Clubs outside CAF
87	France
42	England
29	Turkey
27	Portugal
21	Belgium
20	Spain
17	Saudi Arabia
15	Germany, Italy
11	Greece
8	Netherlands
6	Sweden
5	China, Scotland
4	Romania, Switzerland
3	Qatar, United States
2	Austria, Bulgaria, Canada, Czech Republic, Israel, Slovakia
1	Australia, Croatia, Cyprus, Denmark, India, Japan, Kazakhstan, Liechtenstein, Lithuania, Luxembourg, Oman, Serbia, Thailand, Ukraine, Wales

==== By club confederation ====
Nations in bold are represented by their national teams in the tournament.

Players	Clubs
317	UEFA
202	CAF
28	AFC
5	CONCACAF
0	CONMEBOL
0	OFC

=== By representatives of domestic league ===
National squad	Players
South Africa	17
Egypt	15
Tanzania	14
Angola	12
Namibia	9
Tunisia	9
Kenya	8
Mauritania	6
DR Congo	5
Uganda	4
Benin	2
Ivory Coast	2
Madagascar	2
Mali	2
Morocco	2
Algeria	1
Burundi	1
Ghana	1
Guinea-Bissau	1
Nigeria	1
Zimbabwe	1
Cameroon	0
Guinea	0
Senegal	0
