= 2019 Africa Cup of Nations Group C =

Football tournament group stage

Group C of the 2019 Africa Cup of Nations took place from 23 June to 1 July 2019. The group consisted of Algeria, Kenya, Senegal and Tanzania.

Algeria and Senegal advanced to the round of 16.

== Teams ==
| Draw position | Team | Zone | Method of qualification | Date of qualification | Finals appearance | Last appearance | Previous best performance | FIFA Rankings | |
| Draw position | Team | Zone | Method of qualification | Date of qualification | Finals appearance | Last appearance | Previous best performance | April 2019 (Note: The rankings of April 2019 were used for seeding for the final draw.) | June 2019 |
|---|---|---|---|---|---|---|---|---|---|
| C1 | Senegal | WAFU | Group A winners | 16 October 2018 | 15th | 2017 | Runners-up (2002) | 23 | 22 |
| C2 | Algeria | UNAF | Group D winners | 18 November 2018 | 18th | 2017 | Winners (1990) | 70 | 68 |
| C3 | Kenya | CECAFA | Group F runners-up | 30 November 2018 | 6th | 2004 | Group stage (1972, 1988, 1990, 1992, 2004) | 108 | 105 |
| C4 | Tanzania | CECAFA | Group L runners-up | 24 March 2019 | 2nd | 1980 | Group stage (1980) | 131 | 131 |

== Standings ==
| Pos | Team | Pld | W | D | L | GF | GA | GD | Pts | Qualification |
|---|---|---|---|---|---|---|---|---|---|---|
| 1 | Algeria | 3 | 3 | 0 | 0 | 6 | 0 | +6 | 9 | Advance to knockout stage |
| 2 | Senegal | 3 | 2 | 0 | 1 | 5 | 1 | +4 | 6 | Advance to knockout stage |
| 3 | Kenya | 3 | 1 | 0 | 2 | 3 | 7 | −4 | 3 | |
| 4 | Tanzania | 3 | 0 | 0 | 3 | 2 | 8 | −6 | 0 | |

Source: CAF
Rules for classification: Tiebreakers

In the round of 16:

- The winners of Group C, Algeria, advanced to play the third-placed team of Group B, Guinea.
- The runners-up of Group C, Senegal, advanced to play the runners-up of Group A, Uganda.

== Matches ==
=== Senegal vs Tanzania ===
23 June 2019
19:00

| Senegal | 2–0 | Tanzania |
|---|---|---|
| Keita 28'; Diatta 64' | Report |

30 June Stadium, Cairo
Attendance: 7,249
Referee: Sadok Selmi (Tunisia)

| Senegal | Tanzania |

| GK | 16 | Edouard Mendy |
| RB | 22 | Moussa Wagué |
| CB | 6 | Salif Sané | | (substituted off) 24' |
| CB | 3 | Kalidou Koulibaly |
| LB | 12 | Youssouf Sabaly |
| RM | 18 | Ismaïla Sarr |
| CM | 5 | Idrissa Gueye (c) |
| CM | 17 | Badou Ndiaye | (yellow card) 15' |
| LM | 15 | Krépin Diatta |
| CF | 11 | Keita Baldé | | (substituted off) 73' |
| CF | 9 | M'Baye Niang | | (substituted off) 83' |
Substitutions:
| MF | 8 | Cheikhou Kouyaté | | (substituted in) 24' |
| MF | 20 | Sada Thioub | | (substituted in) 73' |
| FW | 7 | Moussa Konaté | | (substituted in) 83' |
Manager:
Aliou Cissé

| GK | 18 | Aishi Manula |
| RB | 22 | Hassan Kessy | (yellow card) 90+1' |
| CB | 6 | David Mwantika |
| CB | 5 | Kelvin Yondan |
| LB | 2 | Gadiel Kamagi |
| CM | 3 | Feisal Salum | (yellow card) 9' | (substituted off) 44' |
| CM | 23 | Mudathir Yahya | | (substituted off) 84' |
| RW | 7 | Himid Mao | (yellow card) 36' |
| AM | 12 | Simon Msuva | (yellow card) 63' | (substituted off) 66' |
| LW | 14 | Raphael Bocco |
| CF | 10 | Mbwana Samatta (c) |
Substitutions:
| MF | 17 | Faridi Mussa | | (substituted in) 44' |
| FW | 11 | Thomas Ulimwengu | | (substituted in) 66' |
| MF | 8 | Frank Domayo | | (substituted in) 84' |
Manager:
(Nigeria) Emmanuel Amunike

Man of the Match:
Krépin Diatta (Senegal)

Assistant referees:
Anouar Hmila (Tunisia)
Attia Amsaaed (Libya)
Fourth official:
Haithem Guirat (Tunisia)

=== Algeria vs Kenya ===
23 June 2019
22:00

| Algeria | 2–0 | Kenya |
|---|---|---|
| Bounedjah 34' (pen.); Mahrez 43' | Report |

30 June Stadium, Cairo
Attendance: 8,071
Referee: Mahamadou Keita (Mali)

| Algeria | Kenya |

| GK | 23 | Raïs M'Bolhi |
| RB | 20 | Youcef Atal |
| CB | 2 | Aïssa Mandi |
| CB | 4 | Djamel Benlamri |
| LB | 21 | Ramy Bensebaini |
| RM | 7 | Riyad Mahrez (c) |
| CM | 17 | Adlène Guedioura | (substituted off) 71' |
| CM | 22 | Ismaël Bennacer |
| LM | 8 | Youcef Belaïli | (substituted off) 74' |
| SS | 10 | Sofiane Feghouli |
| CF | 9 | Baghdad Bounedjah | (substituted off) 81' |
Substitutions:
| MF | 19 | Mehdi Abeid | (substituted in) 71' |
| MF | 11 | Yacine Brahimi | (substituted in) 74' |
| FW | 15 | Andy Delort | (substituted in) 81' |
Manager:
Djamel Belmadi

| GK | 18 | Patrick Matasi |
| RB | 20 | Philemon Otieno | (yellow card) 18' |
| CB | 2 | Joseph Okumu |
| CB | 5 | Musa Mohammed |
| LB | 3 | Aboud Omar | (yellow card) 13' |
| CM | 12 | Victor Wanyama (c) |
| CM | 21 | Dennis Odhiambo | | (substituted off) 89' |
| RW | 7 | Ayub Masika |
| AM | 11 | Francis Kahata | | (substituted off) 46' |
| LW | 10 | Eric Johana Omondi | | (substituted off) 72' |
| CF | 14 | Michael Olunga |
Substitutions:
| DF | 13 | Erick Ouma Otieno | | (substituted in) 46' |
| MF | 8 | Johanna Omolo | | (substituted in) 72' |
| MF | 17 | Ismael Athuman | | (substituted in) 89' |
Manager:
(France) Sébastien Migné

Man of the Match:
Ismaël Bennacer (Algeria)

Assistant referees:
Issa Yaya (Chad)
Sidiki Sidibé (Guinea)
Fourth official:
Andofetra Rakotojaona (Madagascar)

=== Senegal vs Algeria ===
27 June 2019
19:00

| Senegal | 0–1 | Algeria |
|---|---|---|
| | Report | Belaïli 49' |

30 June Stadium, Cairo
Attendance: 25,765
Referee: Janny Sikazwe (Zambia)

| Senegal | Algeria |

| GK | 16 | Edouard Mendy |
| RB | 22 | Moussa Wagué |
| CB | 8 | Cheikhou Kouyaté (c) | (yellow card) 16' |
| CB | 3 | Kalidou Koulibaly |
| LB | 12 | Youssouf Sabaly |
| CM | 13 | Alfred N'Diaye | | (substituted off) 87' |
| CM | 17 | Badou Ndiaye |
| RW | 15 | Krépin Diatta | | (substituted off) 73' |
| LW | 10 | Sadio Mané |
| CF | 11 | Keita Baldé | (yellow card) 39' | (substituted off) 63' |
| CF | 9 | M'Baye Niang |
Substitutions:
| MF | 20 | Sada Thioub | | (substituted in) 63' |
| FW | 19 | Mbaye Diagne | | (substituted in) 73' |
| MF | 14 | Henri Saivet | | (substituted in) 87' |
Manager:
Aliou Cissé

| GK | 23 | Raïs M'Bolhi |
| RB | 20 | Youcef Atal | (yellow card) 24' |
| CB | 2 | Aïssa Mandi |
| CB | 4 | Djamel Benlamri | (yellow card) 21' |
| LB | 21 | Ramy Bensebaini | | (substituted off) 80' |
| RM | 7 | Riyad Mahrez (c) |
| CM | 17 | Adlène Guedioura |
| CM | 22 | Ismaël Bennacer | | (substituted off) 90+2' |
| LM | 8 | Youcef Belaïli | | (substituted off) 86' |
| SS | 10 | Sofiane Feghouli |
| CF | 9 | Baghdad Bounedjah |
Substitutions:
| MF | 6 | Mohamed Fares | | (substituted in) 80' |
| FW | 15 | Andy Delort | | (substituted in) 86' |
| MF | 19 | Mehdi Abeid | | (substituted in) 90+2' |
Manager:
Djamel Belmadi

Man of the Match:
Ismaël Bennacer (Algeria)

Assistant referees:
Waleed Ahmed Ali (Sudan)
Berhe O'Michael (Eritrea)
Fourth official:
Bernard Camille (Seychelles)

=== Kenya vs Tanzania ===
27 June 2019
22:00

| Kenya | 3–2 | Tanzania |
|---|---|---|
| Olunga 39', 80'; Omolo 62' | Report | Msuva 6'; Samatta 40' |

30 June Stadium, Cairo
Attendance: 7,233
Referee: Ahmad Heeralall (Mauritius)

| Kenya | Tanzania |

| GK | 18 | Patrick Matasi |
| RB | 15 | David Owino | | (substituted off) 46' |
| CB | 5 | Musa Mohammed |
| CB | 2 | Joseph Okumu |
| LB | 3 | Aboud Omar | | (substituted off) 68' |
| CM | 8 | Johanna Omolo | (yellow card) 24' |
| CM | 12 | Victor Wanyama (c) | (yellow card) 56' |
| RW | 7 | Ayub Masika |
| AM | 11 | Francis Kahata | | (substituted off) 33' |
| LW | 13 | Erick Ouma Otieno |
| CF | 14 | Michael Olunga |
Substitutions:
| FW | 9 | John Avire | | (substituted in) 33' |
| DF | 6 | Bernard Ochieng | | (substituted in) 46' |
| FW | 10 | Eric Johana Omondi | | (substituted in) 68' |
Manager:
(France) Sébastien Migné

| GK | 18 | Aishi Manula |
| RB | 22 | Hassan Kessy |
| CB | 6 | David Mwantika | (yellow card) 29' |
| CB | 4 | Erasto Nyoni | | (substituted off) 80' |
| CB | 5 | Kelvin Yondan |
| LB | 2 | Gadiel Kamagi |
| CM | 11 | Thomas Ulimwengu | | (substituted off) 70' |
| CM | 23 | Mudathir Yahya | (yellow card) 49' | (substituted off) 52' |
| CM | 17 | Faridi Mussa |
| CF | 10 | Mbwana Samatta (c) |
| CF | 12 | Simon Msuva |
Substitutions:
| FW | 7 | Himid Mao | | (substituted in) 52' |
| FW | 14 | Raphael Bocco | | (substituted in) 70' |
| MF | 8 | Frank Domayo | | (substituted in) 80' |
Manager:
(Nigeria) Emmanuel Amunike

Man of the Match:
Michael Olunga (Kenya)

Assistant referees:
Seydou Tiama (Burkina Faso)
Mahamadou Gado (Niger)
Fourth official:
Louis Hakizimana (Rwanda)

=== Kenya vs Senegal ===
1 July 2019
21:00

| Kenya | 0–3 | Senegal |
|---|---|---|
| | Report | Sarr 63'; Mané 71', 78' (pen.) |

30 June Stadium, Cairo
Attendance: 13,224
Referee: Gehad Grisha (Egypt)

| Kenya | Senegal |

| GK | 18 | Patrick Matasi |
| RB | 20 | Philemon Otieno | (yellow card) 10' (red card) 76' |
| CB | 5 | Musa Mohammed |
| CB | 2 | Joseph Okumu | (yellow card) 68' |
| LB | 3 | Aboud Omar |
| CM | 8 | Johanna Omolo |
| CM | 12 | Victor Wanyama (c) |
| CM | 21 | Dennis Odhiambo | | (substituted off) 75' |
| RF | 7 | Ayub Masika | (yellow card) 57' | (substituted off) 81' |
| CF | 14 | Michael Olunga |
| LF | 13 | Erick Ouma Otieno |
Substitutions:
| FW | 9 | John Avire | | (substituted in) 75' |
| DF | 6 | Bernard Ochieng | | (substituted in) 81' |
Manager:
(France) Sébastien Migné

| GK | 23 | Alfred Gomis |
| RB | 21 | Lamine Gassama |
| CB | 8 | Cheikhou Kouyaté |
| CB | 3 | Kalidou Koulibaly |
| LB | 2 | Saliou Ciss |
| CM | 17 | Badou Ndiaye |
| CM | 5 | Idrissa Gueye | | (substituted off) 80' |
| RW | 18 | Ismaïla Sarr |
| AM | 14 | Henri Saivet |
| LW | 10 | Sadio Mané (c) | (yellow card) 60' |
| CF | 9 | M'Baye Niang | | (substituted off) 74' |
Substitutions:
| FW | 7 | Moussa Konaté | | (substituted in) 74' |
| MF | 15 | Krépin Diatta | | (substituted in) 80' |
Manager:
Aliou Cissé

Man of the Match:
Sadio Mané (Senegal)

Assistant referees:
Abouelregal Mahmoud (Egypt)
Ahmed Hossam Taha (Egypt)
Fourth official:
Amin Omar (Egypt)

=== Tanzania vs Algeria ===
1 July 2019
21:00

| Tanzania | 0–3 | Algeria |
|---|---|---|
| | Report | Slimani 35'; Ounas 39', 45+1' |

Al Salam Stadium, Cairo
Attendance: 8,921
Referee: Andofetra Rakotojaona (Madagascar)

| Tanzania | Algeria |

| GK | 13 | Metacha Mnata |
| CB | 6 | David Mwantika | | (substituted off) 52' |
| CB | 4 | Erasto Nyoni |
| CB | 20 | Ally Mtoni |
| RWB | 22 | Hassan Kessy |
| LWB | 15 | Mohamed Husseini |
| CM | 3 | Feisal Salum | | (substituted off) 85' |
| CM | 23 | Mudathir Yahya |
| AM | 17 | Faridi Mussa | | (substituted off) 46' |
| CF | 12 | Simon Msuva |
| CF | 10 | Mbwana Samatta (c) |
Substitutions:
| FW | 9 | Adi Yussuf | (yellow card) 47' | (substituted in) 46' |
| FW | 7 | Himid Mao | | (substituted in) 52' |
| FW | 14 | Raphael Bocco | | (substituted in) 85' |
Manager:
(Nigeria) Emmanuel Amunike

| GK | 23 | Raïs M'Bolhi (c) |
| CB | 18 | Mehdi Zeffane |
| CB | 3 | Mehdi Tahrat |
| CB | 5 | Rafik Halliche | (yellow card) 77' |
| RM | 14 | Hicham Boudaoui | (yellow card) 74' |
| CM | 22 | Ismaël Bennacer | | (substituted off) 57' |
| CM | 19 | Mehdi Abeid | | (substituted off) 79' |
| LM | 6 | Mohamed Fares |
| AM | 12 | Adam Ounas | | (substituted off) 74' |
| CF | 13 | Islam Slimani |
| CF | 15 | Andy Delort |
Substitutions:
| MF | 17 | Adlène Guedioura | | (substituted in) 57' |
| MF | 7 | Riyad Mahrez | | (substituted in) 74' |
| FW | 9 | Baghdad Bounedjah | | (substituted in) 79' |
Manager:
Djamel Belmadi

Man of the Match:
Adam Ounas (Algeria)

Assistant referees:
Mahamadou Yahaya (Niger)
Lionel Andrianantenaiana (Madagascar)
Fourth official:
Eric Otogo-Castane (Gabon)
