= Geoffrey Namwandu =

Tanzanian footballer

Personal information
- Full name: Geoffrey Bonny Namwandu
- Date of birth: 31 August 1979 (age 47)
- Position: Midfielder

Senior career*
Years	Team	Apps	(Gls)
–2008	Prisons		
2008–2012	Young Africans		
2012–2013	Saraswoti Youth Club		
2013–2017	Lipuli		

International career^{‡}
2008–2011	Tanzania	17	(0)
- * Club domestic league appearances and goals as of 10 May 2021 ‡ National team caps and goals as of 10 May 2021

Geoffrey Bonny Namwandu (born 31 August 1979) is a retired Tanzanian football midfielder.
