= Joram Mgeveke =

Tanzanian footballer

Personal information
- Date of birth: 5 August 1992 (age 34)
- Place of birth: Iringa, Tanzania
- Height: 1.84 m (6 ft 0 in)
- Position: Defender

Team information
- Current team: pamba jiji

Senior career*
Years	Team	Apps	(Gls)
2011–2012	Abajalo		
2012–2014	Lipuli		
2014–2015	Simba		
2015–	Mwadui United		

International career^{‡}
2014–2015	Tanzania	3	(0)
- * Club domestic league appearances and goals as of 1 August 2021 ‡ National team caps and goals as of 1 August 2021

Joram Mgeveke (born 5 August 1992) is a Tanzanian football defender who plays for Mwadui United.
