= Vicent Philipo =

Tanzanian footballer

Personal information
- Full name: Vicent Philipo Mayombya
- Date of birth: 3 January 1993 (age 33)
- Place of birth: Mwanza, Tanzania
- Height: 1.63 m (5 ft 4 in)
- Position: Defender

Team information
- Current team: Lipuli

Senior career*
Years	Team	Apps	(Gls)
2016–2019	Mbao		
2019–	Lipuli		

International career^{‡}
2019–	Tanzania	1	(0)
- * Club domestic league appearances and goals as of 25 April 2021 ‡ National team caps and goals as of 25 April 2021

Vicent Philipo Mayombya (born 3 January 1993) is a Tanzanian football player who plays for Lipuli. He was selected for the 2019 Africa Cup of Nations squad.
