= Stéphan Raheriharimanana =

Malagasy footballer

Personal information
- Full name: Jean-Stéphan Raheriharimanana
- Date of birth: 16 August 1993 (age 33)
- Place of birth: Toamasina, Madagascar
- Height: 1.68 m (5 ft 6 in)
- Position: Midfielder

Senior career*
Years	Team	Apps	(Gls)
- JS Saint-Pierroise
2012–2016	Nice B	77	(2)
2012–2016	Nice	4	(0)
2016–2019	Red Star	9	(0)
2020–2021	Châteaubriant	0	(0)

International career^{‡}
2016	Madagascar	4	(0)
- * Club domestic league appearances and goals as of 18 April 2021 ‡ National team caps and goals as of 9 June 2017

Jean-Stéphan "Dada" Raheriharimanana (born 16 August 1993) is a former Malagasy footballer who played as a midfielder. He was capped four times for Madagascar.

== Club career ==
On 27 July 2016, out-of-contract Raheriharimanana joined Red Star on a three-year contract and was given the number 20 shirt. In January 2019, Raheriharimanana left the club.

== International career ==
Raheriharimanana was called up to the Madagascar national team in 2016 and made his international debut in an AFCON qualification tie against Angola which ended 1–1 in September 2016.
