= Ryan Ponti =

Malagasy footballer (born 1998)

Personal information
- Date of birth: 22 June 1998 (age 28)
- Place of birth: Saint-Pierre, Réunion, France
- Height: 1.85 m (6 ft 1 in)
- Position: Left-back

Team information
- Current team: Rodez
- Number: 20

Youth career
- 2011–2019: Saint-Pierroise

Senior career*
Years	Team	Apps	(Gls)
2019–2020	Saint-Pierroise		
2020–2022	Auxerre II	39	(0)
2022–2023	Bourg-Péronnas	29	(1)
2023–2025	Orléans	41	(2)
2025–	Rodez	15	(1)

International career^{‡}
2024–	Madagascar	4	(0)
- * Club domestic league appearances and goals as of 11 May 2026 ‡ National team caps and goals as of 23:14, 8 October 2025 (UTC)

Ryan Ponti (born 22 June 1998) is a professional footballer who plays as a left-back for Ligue 2 club Rodez. Born in France, he plays for the Madagascar national team.

== Club career ==
Ponti is a youth product of the Réunionnais club Saint-Pierroise and played with them as an amateur, and garnered attention from scouts when he scored the winning goal to eliminate then Ligue 2 club Chamois Niortais in the Coupe de France in January 2020. He moved to mainland France with Auxerre on 31 January 2020 on a 2.5 year contract. He began his senior career with Auxerre's reserves that year.

Ponti spent the 2022–23 season with Bourg-Péronnas in the Championnat National where he was a consistent starter. On 27 July 2023, he transferred to Orléans. On 23 June 2025, he transferred to Rodez in the Ligue 2 on a 2-year contract.

== International career ==
Born in France, Ponti is of Malagasy descent. He was first called up to the Madagascar national team for a set of 2025 Africa Cup of Nations qualification matches in September 2024.
