= Anthony Ngawi =

Footballer (born 1994)

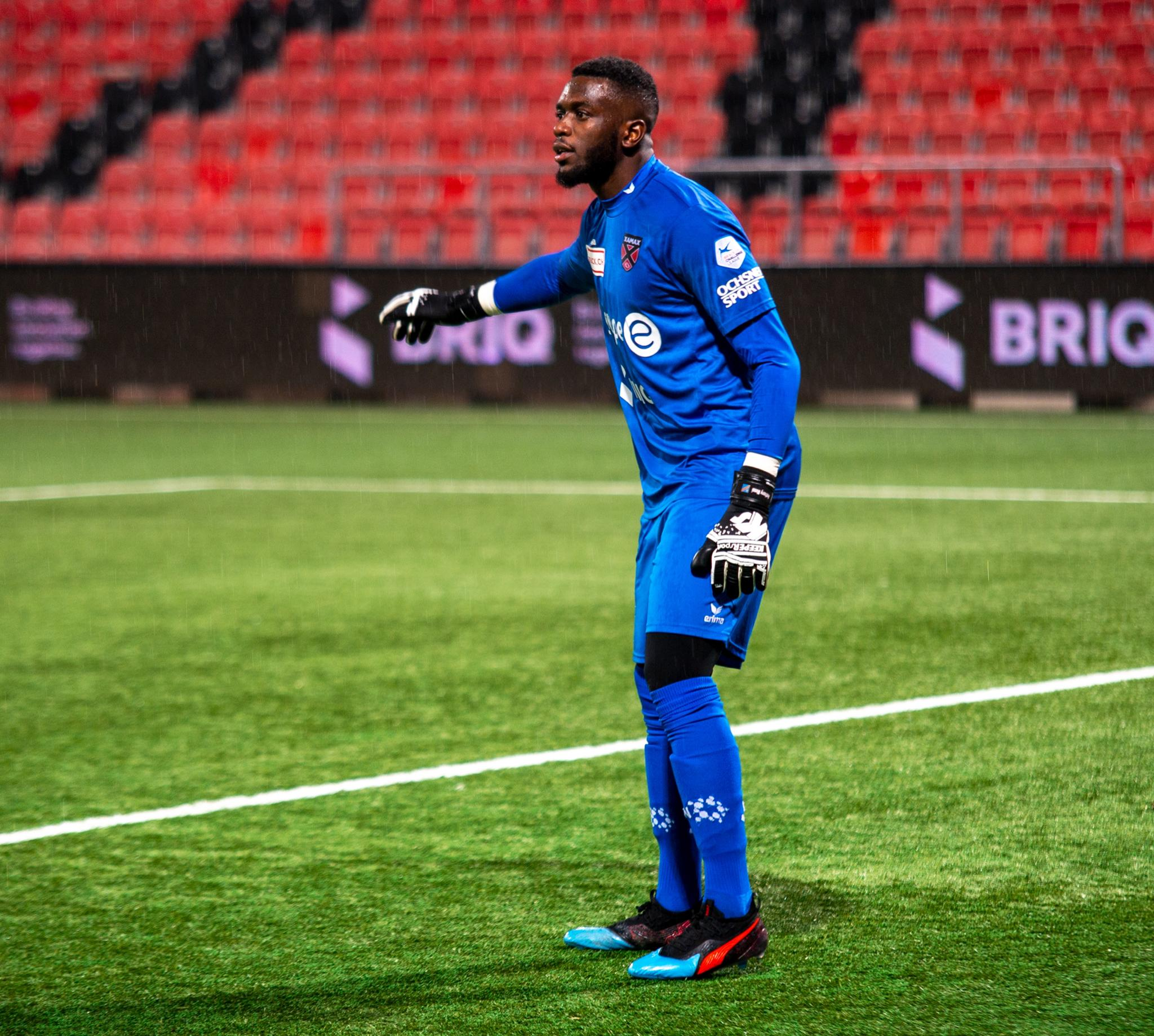

Personal information
- Full name: Anthony Mossi Ngawi
- Date of birth: 15 May 1994 (age 32)
- Place of birth: Paris, France
- Height: 1.89 m (6 ft 2 in)
- Position: Goalkeeper

Team information
- Current team: Xamax
- Number: 1

Youth career
- 2011–2012: Young Boys
- 2012–2013: Biel-Bienne

Senior career*
Years	Team	Apps	(Gls)
2013	Biel-Bienne	1	(0)
2013–2015	Delémont	38	(0)
2015–2017	Le Mont	6	(0)
2017–2019	Chiasso	47	(0)
2019–2020	Wil	9	(0)
2020–2021	Xamax	1	(0)
2022	Septemvri Simitli	3	(0)
2023	Biel-Bienne	3	(0)
2023–2024	Baden	4	(0)
2024–	Xamax	10	(0)

International career^{‡}
2018–	DR Congo	2	(0)
- * Club domestic league appearances and goals as of 28 September 2026 ‡ National team caps and goals as of 20 May 2021

Anthony Mossi Ngawi (born 15 May 1994) is a professional footballer who plays as a goalkeeper for Swiss club Xamax. Born in France, Mossi represents the DR Congo national football team internationally.

== Club career ==
Mossi is a youth international of BSC Young Boys and Biel-Bienne, and spent his early careers in the lower divisions of Switzerland. He played in the Swiss Challenge League with FC Le Mont, and in 2017 transferred to FC Chiasso.

On 26 June 2023, Mossi signed with Baden. He returned to Xamax in July 2024.

== International career ==
Mossi was born in France and is of Congolese descent. He debuted for the DR Congo national team in a 1–1 friendly tie with Nigeria on 28 May 2018.
