= Neuchâtel Xamax FCS =

Association football club in Switzerland

Neuchâtel Xamax
- This file has an invalid non-free use claim and may be deleted at any time.
- Full name: Neuchâtel Xamax Football Club Serrières
- Nickname: Xamax
- Founded: 1906; 120 years ago
- Ground: Stade de la Maladière, Neuchâtel
- Capacity: 12,000
- Owner: Jean-François Collet
- Manager: Bruno Berner
- League: Swiss Challenge League
- 2024–25: Swiss Challenge League, 8th of 10
- Website: www.xamax.ch
Home colours	Away colours

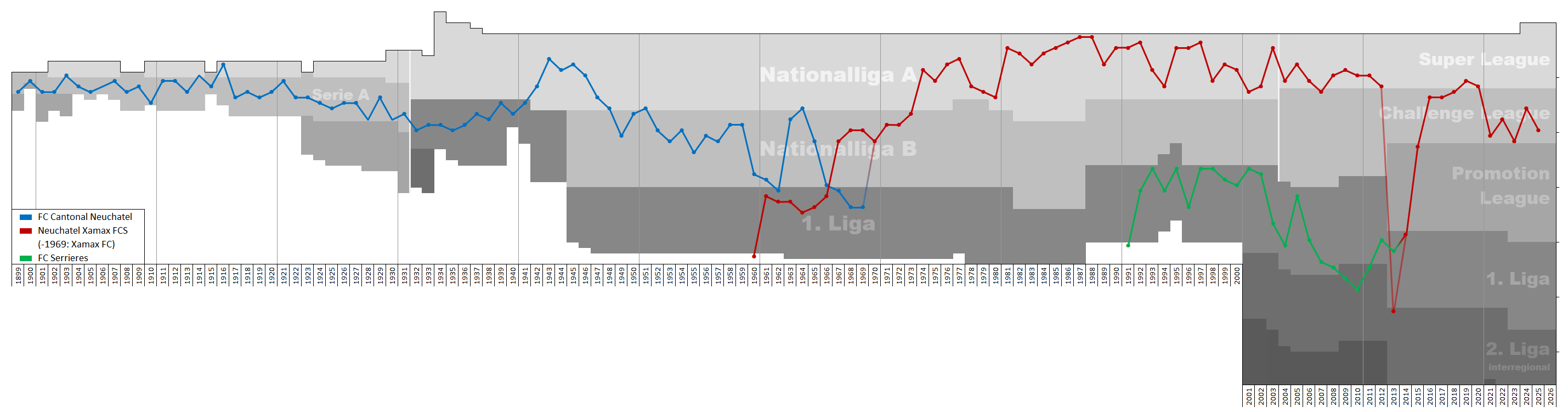
Chart of the table positions of Neuchâtel Xamax FCS and its previous incarnations in the Swiss football league system

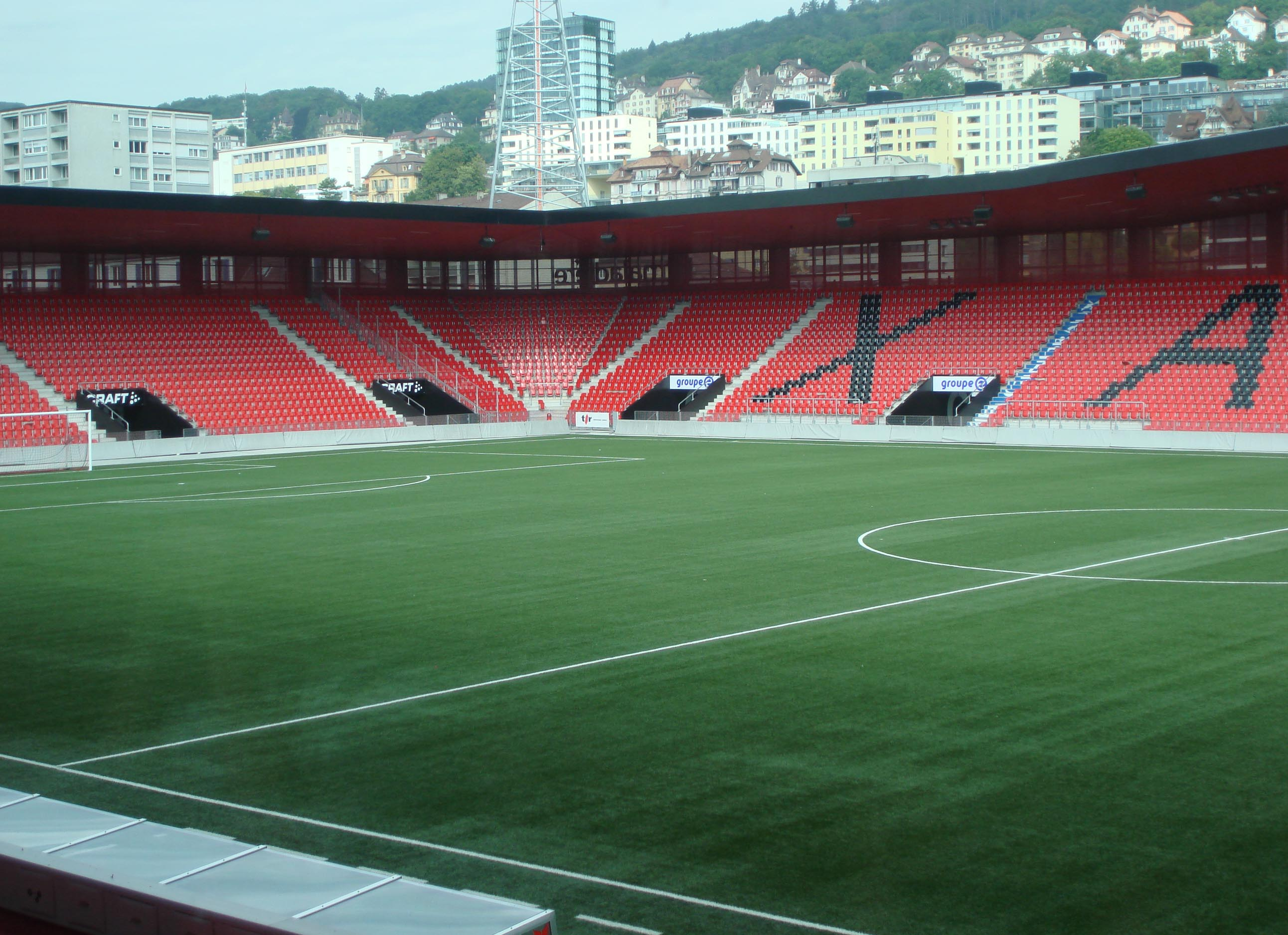
Stade de la Maladière

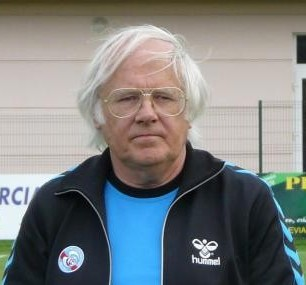
Gilbert Gress, championship winning coach of the 1980s.

Neuchâtel Xamax Football Club Serrières (pronounced [nøʃɑtɛl ksamaks]) is a Swiss football club based in Neuchâtel. It was created in 1970 through a merger between FC Cantonal, founded in 1906 and Swiss champions of 1916, and FC Xamax founded in 1912. The name Xamax comes from legendary Swiss international player 'Xam' Max Abegglen, one of the founding members. Xamax Neuchâtel FCS obtained its current name after a merger with FC Serrières, another side from Neuchâtel, in May 2013.

== History ==
In 1906 the club was founded as FC Cantonal and in 1970 merged with FC Xamax to create the current club.

They have been champions of Switzerland on three occasions, in 1916 and in successive years in 1987 and 1988. The club has also made it to five Swiss Cup finals, the most recent in 2011, but have failed to win any of them.

After many financial crises, the club declared bankruptcy on 26 January 2012 and was consequently excluded from Swiss Super League. The club was reformed, but had to restart in the Swiss amateur leagues, entering the 2. Liga Interregional, the fifth tier of the Swiss football league system, for the 2012–13 season. The club finished first in 2013 and was promoted to the 1. Liga Classic for 2013–14. Once again, Xamax finished first, winning the play-off to secure a second successive promotion. Xamax won 1. Liga Promotion, the third tier of Swiss league system was and promoted to the Challenge League after having a third successive promotion in 2014–15 season.

The club finally won promotion back to the Swiss Super League in 2018, marking the end of a six-year absence from the top flight of Swiss football. At the end of the 2019–20 Swiss Super League season, the club was relegated back to the second division after finishing bottom of the table.

== Stadium ==
The club plays its home matches at the Stade de la Maladière, which began construction in 2004 and was opened in 2007. It has a capacity of 12,500 spectators.

== Current squad ==
As of 26 September 2026

Note: Flags indicate national team as defined under FIFA eligibility rules; some limited exceptions apply. Players may hold more than one non-FIFA nationality.

No.	Pos.	Nation	Player
1	GK	COD	Anthony Ngawi
2	DF	MLI	Ismaël Sidibé
3	DF	SUI	Jonathan Fontana
4	MF	KOS	Eris Abedini
5	DF	NOR	Niklas Gunnarsson
7	DF	SUI	Mickaël Facchinetti
8	MF	FRA	Romain Bayard
9	MF	SEN	Jean Unjanque (on loan from Querétaro)
10	FW	SUI	Liridon Mulaj
11	FW	ESP	Nathan Garcia
13	GK	SLO	Uroš Likar
16	DF	SUI	Léo Seydoux
18	FW	SUI	Jonathan De Donno
21	DF	NED	Léon Bergsma
22	FW	SUI	Janis Lüthi (on loan from Young Boys)

No.	Pos.	Nation	Player
23	GK	ANG	Jean Mayasi
24	FW	GUI	Ibrahima Keita
25	DF	CHA	Mathis Dind
28	MF	MKD	Nikola Gjorgjev
32	FW	NGR	Peter Ambrose
35	MF	SUI	Altin Azemi
36	DF	SUI	Shiloh Reinhard
39	MF	POR	Gonçalo Sacramento
40	FW	SUI	Loïc Veya
41	DF	MAR	Adonis Bourezak
60	DF	SEN	Modibo Camara
70	MF	CAF	Badara Diomandé
77	MF	SUI	Yuri Peverelli (on loan from Lugano)
81	MF	POR	Diogo Carraco
90	FW	CMR	Vincent Nvendo

=== Out on loan ===
Note: Flags indicate national team as defined under FIFA eligibility rules; some limited exceptions apply. Players may hold more than one non-FIFA nationality.

No.	Pos.	Nation	Player
—	GK	SUI	Kilian Arancibia (at Coffrane until 30 June 2027)
—	FW	SUI	Francesco Lentini (at Nyon until 30 June 2027)

== Notable players ==
Cameroon

- (Cameroon) Freddy Mveng

Central African Republic

- (Central African Republic) Louis Mafouta

Egypt

- (Egypt) Hossam Hassan

Ivory Coast

- (Ivory Coast) Eric Tia

Nigeria

- (Nigeria) Brown Ideye
- (Nigeria) Kalu Uche

Senegal

- (Senegal) Papa Bouba Diop

Sierra Leone

- (Sierra Leone) Umaru Bangura

Philippines

- (Philippines) Michael Kempter

Saudi Arabia

- (Saudi Arabia) Hussein Abdulghani

Bosnia and Herzegovina

- (Bosnia and Herzegovina) Mustafa Sejmenović
- (Bosnia and Herzegovina) Ensar Arifović

Bulgaria

- (Bulgaria) Trifon Ivanov

Hungary

- (Hungary) Lajos Détári

West Germany

- (West Germany) Uli Stielike

Ireland

- (Republic of Ireland) Don Givens

Liechtenstein

- (Liechtenstein) Noah Frick

Spain

- (Spain) Víctor Sánchez

Switzerland

- (Switzerland) Johan Djourou
- (Switzerland) Lucien Favre
- (Switzerland) Mario Gavranović
- (Switzerland) Haris Seferovic

Netherlands

- (Netherlands) Rene van der Gijp

== Honours ==
Leagues

- Swiss Super League
  - Winner (3): 1915–16, 1986–87, 1987–88
- Swiss Challenge League
  - Winner (3): 1972–73, 2006–07, 2017–18
- Swiss Promotion League
  - Winner: 2014–15
- 1. Liga Classic
  - Winner: 2013–14
- 2. Liga Interregional
  - Winner: 2012–13

Cups

- Swiss Super Cup
  - Winner (3): 1987, 1988, 1990

== Former coaches ==
Coach	Nationality	Tenure
Giovanni Ferrari	(Italy)	1946–1948
Fernand Jaccard	(Switzerland)	1948–1952
Josef Humpál	(Czechoslovakia)	1961–1965
Milorad Milutinović	(Socialist Federal Republic of Yugoslavia)	1968–1969
Josef Humpál	(Czechoslovakia)	1969–1970
Paul Garbani	(Switzerland)	July 1970–Jan 1972
Josef Artimovits	(Austria)	Jan 1972–July 1972
Lev Mantula	(Socialist Federal Republic of Yugoslavia)	July 1972–Jan 1975
Branko Rezuar	(Socialist Federal Republic of Yugoslavia)	Jan 1975–July 1975
Gilbert Gress	(France)	1975–1977
Antonio Merlo	(Italy)	July 1977–April 1978
Erich Vogel	–	April 1978–October 1979
Lev Mantula	(Socialist Federal Republic of Yugoslavia)	October 1979–July 1980
Jean‑Marc Guillou	(France)	1980–1981
Gilbert Gress	(France)	1981–1990
Roy Hodgson	(England)	1990–1992
Uli Stielike	(Germany)	Jan 1992–July 1993
Uli Stielike & Don Givens	(Germany) / (Republic of Ireland)	1993–1994
Gilbert Gress	(France)	1994–1997
Alain Geiger	(Switzerland)	1998–2002
Claude Ryf	(Switzerland)	July 2002–Feb 2004
René Lobello & Christophe Moulin	(France) / (Switzerland)	Feb 2004–July 2004
René Lobello & Gianni Della Casa	(France) / (Italy)	2004–2005
Alain Geiger	(Switzerland)	2005
Miroslav Blažević	(Croatia)	2005–2006
Gérard Castella	(Switzerland)	June 2006–March 2008
Néstor Clausen	(Argentina)	2008–Jan 2009
Jean‑Michel Aeby	(Switzerland)	Jan 2009–June 2009
Pierre‑André Schürmann	(Switzerland)	June 2009–April 2010
Jean‑Michel Aeby	(Switzerland)	April 2010–Aug 2010
Didier Ollé‑Nicolle	(France)	Sept 2010–May 2011
Bernard Challandes	(Switzerland)	May 2011
Sonny Anderson	(Brazil)	2011
François Ciccolini	(France)	July 2011
Joaquín Caparrós	(Spain)	July 2011–Sept 2011
Víctor Muñoz	(Spain)	Sept 2011–Jan 2012
Roberto Cattilaz	(Switzerland)	May 2012–Oct 2015
Michel Decastel	(Switzerland)	Oct 2015–Feb 2019
Stéphane Henchoz	(Switzerland)	Feb 2019–June 2019
Joël Magnin	(Switzerland)	July 2019–July 2020
Stéphane Henchoz	(Switzerland)	July 2020–Dec 2020
Martin Rueda	(Switzerland)	Dec 2020
Andrea Binotto	(Switzerland) / (Italy)	Jan 2021–Aug 2022
Jeff Saibene	(Luxembourg) / (Switzerland)	Aug 2022–Apr 2023
Uli Forte	(Italy)	Apr 2023–Dec 2024
Anthony Braizat	(France)	Dec 2024–present

== European record ==
Season	Competition	Round	Opponents	Home	Away	Aggregate
1981–82	UEFA Cup	1R	(Czechoslovakia) Sparta Prague	4–0	2–3	6–3
1981–82	UEFA Cup	2R	(Sweden) Malmö	1–0	1–0	2–0
1981–82	UEFA Cup	3R	(Portugal) Sporting CP	1–0	0–0	1–0
1981–82	UEFA Cup	QF	(West Germany) Hamburg	0–0	2–3	2–3
1984–85	UEFA Cup	1R	(Greece) Olympiacos	2–2	0–1	2–3
1985–86	UEFA Cup	1R	(Romania) Sportul Studențesc	3–0	4–4	7–4
1985–86	UEFA Cup	2R	(Bulgaria) Lokomotiv Sofia	0–0	1–1	1–1 (a)
1985–86	UEFA Cup	3R	(Scotland) Dundee United	3–1	1–2	4–3
1985–86	UEFA Cup	QF	(Spain) Real Madrid	2–0	0–3	2–3
1986–87	UEFA Cup	1R	(Denmark) Lyngby	2–0	3–1	5–1
1986–87	UEFA Cup	2R	(Netherlands) Groningen	1–1	0–0	1–1 (a)
1987–88	European Cup	1R	(Finland) Kuusysi	5–0	1–2	6–2
1987–88	European Cup	2R	(Germany) Bayern Munich	2–1	0–2	2–3
1988–89	European Cup	1R	(Greece) AEL	2–1	1–2	3–3 (3–0 p)
1988–89	European Cup	2R	(Turkey) Galatasaray	3–0	0–5	3–5
1990–91	European Cup Winners' Cup	1R	(Portugal) Estrela de Amadora	1–1	1–1	2–2 (3–4 p)
1991–92	UEFA Cup	1R	(Malta) Floriana	2–0	0–0	2–0
1991–92	UEFA Cup	2R	(Scotland) Celtic	5–1	0–1	5–2
1991–92	UEFA Cup	3R	(Spain) Real Madrid	1–0	0–4	1–4
1992–93	UEFA Cup	1R	(Denmark) BK Frem	2–2	1–4	3–6
1995–96	UEFA Cup	QR	(Serbia and Montenegro) Red Star Belgrade	0–0	1–0	1–0
1995–96	UEFA Cup	1R	(Italy) Roma	1–1	0–4	1–4
1996–97	UEFA Cup	QR	(Cyprus) Anorthosis Famagusta	4–0	2–1	6–1
1996–97	UEFA Cup	1R	(Ukraine) Dynamo Kyiv	2–1	0–0	2–1
1996–97	UEFA Cup	2R	(Sweden) Helsingborg	1–1	0–2	1–3
1997–98	UEFA Cup	Q1	(Moldova) Tiligul-Tiras Tiraspol	7–0	3–1	10–1
1997–98	UEFA Cup	Q2	(Norway) Viking	3–0	1–2	4–2
1997–98	UEFA Cup	1R	(Italy) Inter Milan	0–2	0–2	0–4
2003–04	UEFA Cup	QR	(Malta) Valletta	2–0	2–0	4–0
2003–04	UEFA Cup	1R	(France) Auxerre	0–1	0–1	0–2
