= Rashid Mandawa =

Tanzanian footballer

Personal information
- Full name: Rashid Yussuf Mandawa
- Date of birth: 21 March 1996 (age 30)
- Place of birth: Tanga, Tanzania
- Height: 1.67 m (5 ft 6 in)
- Position: Forward

Senior career*
Years	Team	Apps	(Gls)
2012–2014	Coastal Union		
2014–2015	Kagera Sugar		
2015–2016	Mwadui United		
2016–2017	Mtibwa Sugar		
2017–2019	Botswana Defence Force XI		
2019–2020	TS Galaxy	1	(0)
2021–	JKT Ruvu Stars		

International career^{‡}
2015–	Tanzania	6	(0)
- * Club domestic league appearances and goals as of 3 October 2021 ‡ National team caps and goals as of 3 October 2021

Rashid Mandawa (born 21 March 1996) is a Tanzanian football player who plays as a forward.
