= JS Saint-Pierroise =

Association football club in Réunion

- Full name: Jeunesse Sportive Saint-Pierroise
- Founded: 1950
- Ground: Stade Michel Volnay; Saint-Pierre, Réunion
- Capacity: 8,010
- Chairman: Patrick Candassamy
- Manager: Jimmy Bade
- League: Réunion Premier League
- 2025: Champions
- Website: jssp.footeo.com
Home colours

Jeunesse Sportive Saint-Pierroise (JSSP) is a French football club from Saint-Pierre, Réunion. Its most notable players are Roger Milla, from the Cameroon national football team and Jean Pierre Papin, from the France national football team. JS Saint-Pierroise often play their home games in front of hundreds of spectators at the 8,010-capacity Stade Michel-Volnay.

In 2019-2020, they became only the second team from a French overseas territory to reach the final 32 of the Coupe de France.

== Achievements ==
- Réunion Premier League: 22
  - 1956, 1957, 1959, 1960, 1961, 1971, 1972, 1973, 1975, 1976, 1978, 1989, 1990, 1993, 1994, 2008, 2015, 2016, 2017, 2018, 2019, 2025
- Coupe de la Réunion: 12
  - 1959, 1962, 1971, 1980, 1984, 1989, 1992, 1993, 1994, 2018, 2019, 2022
- Coupe D.O.M: 3
  - 1990, 1991, 1995

== Performance in CAF competitions ==
- CAF Champions League: 2 appearances

1997 – Second Round
2007 – withdrew in Preliminary Round

- African Cup of Champions Clubs: 2 appearances

1994 – First Round
1995 – Second Round

- CAF Cup: 1 appearance

2002 – First Round

== The club in the French football structure ==
- Coupe de France: 9 appearances

1964–65 – Seventh Round
1971–72 – Seventh Round
1976–77 – Seventh Round
1977–78 – Eighth Round
1989–90 – Round of 64
2016–17 – Seventh Round
2019–20 – Round of 32
2020–21 – Eighth Round
2022–23 – Seventh Round

== Squad ==
Note: Flags indicate national team as defined under FIFA eligibility rules; some limited exceptions apply. Players may hold more than one non-FIFA nationality.

No.	Pos.	Nation	Player
—	GK	MAD	Ibrahima Dabo
—	GK	REU	Maxime Tseng-Thon
—	GK	REU	Yann Hubert
—	GK	REU	Mathieu Pélops
—	DF	MAD	Stéphan Raheriharimanana
—	DF	REU	Johan Lionel
—	DF	REU	Thomas Souevamanien
—	DF	MAD	Pascal Razakanantenaina
—	DF	REU	Bertrand Bador
—	DF	REU	Ali Souéfou
—	DF	MAD	Mamy Randrianarisoa
—	DF	REU	Joe Damour
—	DF	REU	Quentin Gontrand
—	MF	FRA	Elliot Grandin

No.	Pos.	Nation	Player
—	MF	REU	John Babas
—	MF	REU	Gérard Hubert
—	MF	REU	Anjy Vardapin
—	MF	REU	Romain Picard
—	MF	COD	Alexis Chamba
—	MF	REU	Ryan Ponti
—	FW	REU	Nayel Ousséni
—	FW	REU	Jean-Michel Fontaine
—	FW	REU	Alexandre Loricourt
—	FW	REU	Vincent Tseng-Thon
—	FW	MAD	Fabrice Rakotondraibe

== Notable players ==
Includes players who have played football in a European top-flight side.

- (France) Didier Agathe
- (France) Nicolas Alnoudji
- (Réunion) Jean-Pierre Bade
- (Romania) Alexandru Bănuță
- (Comoros) El Fardou Ben Nabouhane
- (France) Elliot Grandin
- (Madagascar) William Gros
- (France) Guillaume Hoarau
- (Gabon) Thierry Issiémou
- (Cameroon) Roger Milla
- (Cameroon) Pius Ndiefi
- (France) Jean-Pierre Papin
- (France) Dimitri Payet
- (Brazil) Rudison
- (France) Djibril Cissé
