= Rodrigue Kossi =

Beninese footballer

Personal information
- Full name: Rodrigue Kossi Fiogbé
- Date of birth: 11 July 2000 (age 26)
- Place of birth: Parakou, Benin
- Height: 1.79 m (5 ft 10 in)
- Position: Midfielder

Senior career*
Years	Team	Apps	(Gls)
2017	Les Buffles FC du Borgou		
2018–2023	Club Africain	59	(0)
2023–2024	Al-Taraji	27	(0)

International career^{‡}
- Benin youth
2019–	Benin	12	(0)
- * Club domestic league appearances and goals as of 08:15, 13 October 2024 (UTC) ‡ National team caps and goals as of 08:15, 13 October 2024 (UTC)

Rodrigue Kossi Fiogbé (born 11 July 2000) is a Beninese professional footballer who plays as a midfielder.

== Club career ==
Kossi was born in Parakou. After beginning his senior club career with Les Buffles FC du Borgou in 2017, Kossi signed for Tunisian club Club Africain in September 2018.

On 5 July 2023, Saudi club Al-Taraji announced the signing of Kossi.

== International career ==
Kossi represented Benin at youth level, and received his first call-up to the senior national team in March 2019.

He made his Benin national football team debut on 6 September 2019 in a friendly against Ivory Coast, when he substituted Jordan Adéoti in the 82nd minute.
