= Ibrahima Dabo =

Footballer (born 1992)

Personal information
- Full name: Ibrahima Ousmane Arthur Dabo
- Date of birth: 22 July 1992 (age 34)
- Place of birth: Créteil, France
- Height: 1.82 m (6 ft 0 in)
- Position: Goalkeeper

Senior career*
Years	Team	Apps	(Gls)
2010–2012	Créteil	3	(0)
2010–2017	Créteil B	32	(0)
2017–2019	FC Gobelins	3	(0)
2019–2021	JS Saint-Pierroise	33	(0)

International career^{‡}
2017–2019	Madagascar	10	(0)
- * Club domestic league appearances and goals as of 14:35, 18 August 2023 (UTC) ‡ National team caps and goals as of 14:35, 18 August 2023 (UTC)

Ibrahima Ousmane Arthur Dabo (born 22 July 1992) is a footballer who most recently played as a goalkeeper for JS Saint-Pierroise. Born in France, he played for the Madagascar national team.

== Club career ==
Born in Créteil, Dabo has played for Créteil, Créteil B, FC Gobelins and JS Saint-Pierroise.

== International career ==
Dabo's is of Senegalese descent, and his grandmother was born in Madagascar. He made his international debut for Madagascar in 2017.
