= Justin Ndikumana =

Burundian footballer

Personal information
- Full name: Justin Ndikumana Kabengele
- Date of birth: 1 March 1993 (age 33)
- Place of birth: Buyenzi, Burundi
- Height: 1.87 m (6 ft 2 in)
- Position: Goalkeeper

Team information
- Current team: Mtibwa Sugar

Senior career*
Years	Team	Apps	(Gls)
2008–2012	Prince Louis		
2012–2014	Vital'O		
2014–2017	Muungano		
2017–2018	Saint-Éloi		
2018–2019	Sofapaka	28	(0)
2019–2022	Bandari		
2022–2024	Coastal Union	13	(0)
2024–	Mtibwa Sugar	9	(0)

International career^{‡}
2019–	Burundi	4	(0)
- * Club domestic league appearances and goals as of 1 August 2020 ‡ National team caps and goals as of 1 August 2020

Justin Ndikumana (born 1 March 1993) is a Burundian football goalkeeper who plays for Mtibwa Sugar. He was a squad member at the 2019 Africa Cup of Nations.
