= Ally Mtoni =

Tanzanian footballer (1993–2022)

Personal information
- Full name: Ally Abdukarim Ibrahim Mtoni
- Date of birth: 13 March 1993
- Place of birth: Dar es Salaam, Tanzania
- Date of death: 11 February 2022 (aged 28)
- Place of death: Dar-es-Salaam, Tanzania
- Position: Defender

Senior career*
Years	Team	Apps	(Gls)
2012–2013	Kagera Sugar		
2016–2019	Lipuli		
2019–2020	Young Africans		
2021	Ruvu Shooting		

International career^{‡}
2018–2019	Tanzania	3	(0)
- * Club domestic league appearances and goals ‡ National team caps and goals as of 1 July 2019

Ally Abdukarim Ibrahim Mtoni (13 March 1993 – 11 February 2022), also known as Ally Sonso, was a Tanzanian footballer who played as a defender.

== Early life ==
Mtoni was born at the Muhimbili National Hospital in Dar es Salaam, on 13 March 1993.

== Club career ==
Mtoni has played for Kagera Sugar FC and Lipuli FC, Young Africans SC and Ruvu Shooting FC in Tanzania.

== International career ==
Mtoni made his Tanzania national football team debut on 18 November 2018 in an AFCON 2019 qualifier against Lesotho.

Mtoni was selected for the 2019 Africa Cup of Nations squad.

== Personal life ==
Toni died in Dar es Salaam on 11 February 2022, at the age of 28.
