= Toavina Rambeloson =

Malagasy footballer

Personal information
- Full name: Toavina Hasitiana Rambeloson
- Date of birth: 26 November 1992 (age 33)
- Place of birth: Mananjary, Madagascar
- Height: 1.81 m (5 ft 11 in)
- Position: Defender

Team information
- Current team: Saint-Denis

Senior career*
Years	Team	Apps	(Gls)
2011–2014	Ajesaia		
2014–2015	Lusitanos Saint-Maur		
2015–2016	Red Star B		
2016–2018	Tourcoing	41	(0)
2018–2020	Arras	29	(0)
2020–2022	IC Croix	4	(0)
2022–	Saint-Denis		

International career^{‡}
2017–	Madagascar	8	(0)
- * Club domestic league appearances and goals as of 22:16, 8 December 2020 (UTC) ‡ National team caps and goals as of 22:16, 8 December 2020 (UTC)

Toavina Hasitiana Rambeloson (born 26 November 1992), also known as Deba Kely, is a Malagasy international footballer who plays as a defender for Saint-Denis.

== Career ==
Born in Mananjary, Rambeloson has played for Ajesaia, Lusitanos Saint-Maur, Red Star B, Tourcoing, Arras and IC Croix.

He made his international debut for Madagascar in 2017.
