= Frank Domayo =

Tanzanian football player

Personal information
- Full name: Frank Raymond Domayo
- Date of birth: 16 February 1993 (age 33)
- Place of birth: Dar es Salaam, Tanzania
- Position: Midfielder

Team information
- Current team: Azam FC

Senior career*
Years	Team	Apps	(Gls)
2010–2012	JKT Ruvu Stars		
2012–2014	Young Africans		
2014–	Azam FC		

International career^{‡}
2012–	Tanzania	34	(0)
- * Club domestic league appearances and goals ‡ National team caps and goals as of 23 June 2019

Frank Raymond Domayo (born 16 February 1993) is a Tanzanian football player. He plays for Azam.

== International ==
He made his Tanzania national football team debut on 26 May 2012 in a friendly against Malawi.

He was selected for the 2019 Africa Cup of Nations squad.
