= Hassan Kessy =

Tanzanian footballer

Personal information
- Full name: Hassan Khamisi Ramadhani
- Date of birth: 25 December 1994 (age 31)
- Place of birth: Morogoro, Tanzania
- Position: Defender

Team information
- Current team: Nkana
- Number: 22

Senior career*
Years	Team	Apps	(Gls)
2011–2014	Mtibwa Sugar		
2014–2016	Simba		
2016–2018	Young Africans		
2018–	Nkana		

International career^{‡}
2015–	Tanzania	15	(0)
- * Club domestic league appearances and goals ‡ National team caps and goals as of 23 June 2019

Hassan Khamisi Ramadhani, known as Hassan Kessy (born 25 December 1994) is a Tanzanian football player. He plays in Zambia for Nkana.

== International ==
He made his Tanzania national football team debut on 28 November 2015 in a 2015 CECAFA Cup game against Ethiopia.

He was selected for the 2019 Africa Cup of Nations squad.
