= Ismael Athuman =

Kenyan footballer (born 1995)

Personal information
- Full name: Ismael Said Athuman González
- Date of birth: 1 February 1995 (age 31)
- Place of birth: San Bartolomé de Tirajana, Spain
- Height: 1.85 m (6 ft 1 in)
- Position: Centre back

Team information
- Current team: Gimnàstic

Youth career
- Maspalomas
- –2011: Vecindario
- 2011–2014: Las Palmas

Senior career*
Years	Team	Apps	(Gls)
2014–2015	Las Palmas C		
2014–2017	Las Palmas B	14	(0)
2016	→ Cacereño (loan)	14	(0)
2017	Granada B	6	(0)
2017–2018	Fuenlabrada	12	(0)
2018–2019	Las Palmas B	20	(1)
2020	Las Palmas B	8	(2)
2020–2021	Las Palmas	6	(0)
2021–2022	Murcia	20	(1)
2022–2023	Sabadell	13	(0)
2023–2024	Águilas	22	(2)
2025	Mérida	17	(0)
2025–2026	Zamora	24	(1)
2026–	Gimnàstic	0	(0)

International career^{‡}
2016–	Kenya	11	(0)
- * Club domestic league appearances and goals as of 25 May 2026 ‡ National team caps and goals as of 23 June 2019

Ismael Said Athuman González (born 1 February 1995) is a professional footballer who plays for Spanish club Gimnàstic de Tarragona and the Kenya national team. Mainly a central defender, he can also play as a defensive midfielder.

== Club career ==
Athuman was born in San Bartolomé de Tirajana, Las Palmas, Canary Islands, to a Kenyan father and a Spanish mother, and played youth football with CD Maspalomas, UD Vecindario and UD Las Palmas. He had unsuccessful trials at Manchester City in 2013.

After making his senior debut with Las Palmas' C-team in the regional leagues during the 2014–15 campaign, Athuman subsequently started to appear for the reserves in both Segunda División B and Tercera División. On 5 December 2015, he agreed to a loan deal with third division side CP Cacereño until the end of the season.

Athuman subsequently returned to Las Palmas B in July 2016, but rescinded his contract the following 31 January, and subsequently signed for Granada CF's reserves in the third tier. On 13 July 2017, he moved to fellow league team CF Fuenlabrada.

On 22 August 2018, Athuman returned to Las Palmas and their B-side, now also in the third division. He left the club in the following July, but rejoined the side on 2 January 2020.

On 5 October 2020, after playing for the main squad during the entire pre-season, Athuman was promoted to Las Palmas' first team in Segunda División. He made his professional debut on 5 December, starting in a 0–0 away draw against SD Ponferradina.

Rarely used by the Canarian side, Athuman signed for Segunda División RFEF side Real Murcia CF on 25 August 2021. He continued to feature mainly in the Primera Federación in the following years, representing CE Sabadell FC, Águilas FC, Mérida AD, Zamora CF and Gimnàstic de Tarragona.

== International career ==
Athuman received his first call from Kenya in mid May 2016, for a 2017 Africa Cup of Nations qualifying match against Congo the following month. He made his debut on 31 May 2016 in a friendly with Sudan. He has also represented Kenya at the 2019 Africa Cup of Nations.

== Personal life ==
Athuman's father, Said Ali Athuman Mbaga, known as Billy, is a Kenyan contortionist and acrobat, who lives in Gran Canaria.
