= David Mwantika =

Tanzanian footballer

Personal information
- Full name: David Issa Mwantika
- Date of birth: 21 December 1988 (age 37)
- Height: 1.84 m (6 ft 0 in)
- Position: Defender

Team information
- Current team: Azam

Senior career*
Years	Team	Apps	(Gls)
2012–	Azam		

International career^{‡}
2016–	Tanzania	5	(0)
- * Club domestic league appearances and goals ‡ National team caps and goals as of 23 June 2019

David Issa Mwantika (born 21 December 1988) is a Tanzanian football player. He plays for Azam.

== International ==
He made his Tanzania national football team debut on 23 March 2016 in an AFCON qualifier against Chad.

He was selected for the 2019 Africa Cup of Nations squad.
