= Patrick Matasi =

Kenyan footballer (born 1987)

Personal information
- Full name: Patrick Musotsi Matasi
- Date of birth: 11 December 1987 (age 38)
- Height: 1.83 m (6 ft 0 in)
- Position: Goalkeeper

Team information
- Current team: Kakamega Homeboyz

Senior career*
Years	Team	Apps	(Gls)
2009–2010	Kabrass United		
2011–2014	A.F.C. Leopards	56	(0)
2015–2018	Posta Rangers	62	(0)
2018	Tusker	11	(0)
2018–2021	Saint George	14	(0)
2021–2023	Tusker		
2023–2025	Kenya Police		
2025–	Kakamega Homeboyz		

International career^{‡}
2017–	Kenya	35	(0)
- * Club domestic league appearances and goals as of 19:28, 27 March 2025 (UTC) ‡ National team caps and goals as of 19:28, 27 March 2025 (UTC)

Patrick Musotsi Matasi (born 11 December 1987) is a Kenyan professional footballer who plays as a goalkeeper for Kakamega Homeboyz and the Kenya national team.

== Club career ==
Matasi played club football for Kabrass United, A.F.C. Leopards, Posta Rangers and Tusker before signing a three-year contract with Ethiopian Premier League club Saint George in October 2018. He later returned to Kenya, playing with Tusker and Kenya Police. By March 2025 he was playing for Kakamega Homeboyz, where he was investigated for alleged match fixing.

== International career ==
He made his international debut for Kenya in 2017.
