= Philemon Otieno =

Kenyan footballer

Personal information
- Full name: Philemon Omondi Otieno
- Date of birth: 18 October 1992 (age 34)
- Place of birth: Rachuonyo, Kenya
- Height: 1.85 m (6 ft 1 in)
- Position: Midfielder

Team information
- Current team: Gor Mahia
- Number: 26

Senior career*
Years	Team	Apps	(Gls)
2013–2016	Ushuru	63	(1)
2017–	Gor Mahia		

International career^{‡}
2018–2019	Kenya	11	(0)
- * Club domestic league appearances and goals as of 26 June 2023 ‡ National team caps and goals as of 26 June 2023

Philemon Omondi Otieno (born 18 October 1992) is a Kenyan professional footballer who plays as a midfielder for Kenyan Premier League club Gor Mahia and the Kenya national team.

== International career ==
Otieno made his debut for Kenya on 25 May 2018 against Swaziland.

== Career statistics ==
=== International ===
Statistics accurate as of match played 14 October 2018

Kenya national team
Year	Apps	Goals
2018	5	0
Total	5	0

== Honours ==
- Kenyan Premier League: winner (2017, 2018)
