= Lipuli F.C. =

Tanzanian football club

Lipuli FC
- Full name: Lipuli Football Club
- Nickname: Paluhengo
- Ground: Samora Stadium; Iringa, Tanzania
- Capacity: 5,000
- League: Tanzanian Premier League

Lipuli FC is a football club based in Iringa, Tanzania. They play at 5,000 capacity Samora Stadium in the Tanzanian Premier League after being promoted for the 2017–18 season.

They primarily wear red with white trim. They are now wearing white with maroon trim.
