= 2019 Africa Cup of Nations Group B =

Football tournament group stage

Group B of the 2019 Africa Cup of Nations took place from 22 to 30 June 2019. The group consisted of Burundi, Guinea, Madagascar and Nigeria.

Madagascar and Nigeria as the top two teams, along with Guinea as one of the four best third-placed teams, advanced to the round of 16.

== Teams ==
Draw position	Team	Zone	Method of qualification	Date of qualification	Finals appearance	Last appearance	Previous best performance	FIFA Rankings	
Draw position	Team	Zone	Method of qualification	Date of qualification	Finals appearance	Last appearance	Previous best performance	April 2019 (Note: The rankings of April 2019 were used for seeding for the final draw.)	June 2019
B1	Nigeria	WAFU	Group E winners	17 November 2018	18th	2013	Winners (1980, 1994, 2013)	42	45
B2	Guinea	WAFU	Group H winners	18 November 2018	12th	2015	Runners-up (1976)	68	71
B3	Madagascar	COSAFA	Group A runners-up	16 October 2018	1st	—	Debut	107	108
B4	Burundi	CECAFA	Group C runners-up	23 March 2019	1st	—	Debut	136	134

== Standings ==
Pos	Team	Pld	W	D	L	GF	GA	GD	Pts	Qualification
1	Madagascar	3	2	1	0	5	2	+3	7	Advance to knockout stage
2	Nigeria	3	2	0	1	2	2	0	6	Advance to knockout stage
3	Guinea	3	1	1	1	4	3	+1	4	Advance to knockout stage
4	Burundi	3	0	0	3	0	4	−4	0	

Source: CAF
Rules for classification: Tiebreakers

In the round of 16:

- The winners of Group B, Madagascar advanced to play the third-placed team of Group A, DR Congo.
- The runners-up of Group B, Nigeria advanced to play the runners-up of Group F, Cameroon.
- The third-placed team of Group B, Guinea, advanced to play the winners of Group C, Algeria.

== Matches ==
=== Nigeria vs Burundi ===
22 June 2019
19:00

Nigeria	1–0	Burundi
Ighalo 77'	Report

Alexandria Stadium, Alexandria
Attendance: 3,192
Referee: Bernard Camille (Seychelles)

Nigeria	Burundi

GK	16	Daniel Akpeyi
RB	12	Shehu Abdullahi	(substituted off) 42'
CB	22	Kenneth Omeruo
CB	5	William Troost-Ekong
LB	4	Wilfred Ndidi
DM	10	John Obi Mikel (c)	(substituted off) 58'
RM	2	Ola Aina
CM	8	Peter Etebo
LM	18	Alex Iwobi
SS	13	Samuel Chukwueze
CF	14	Paul Onuachu	(substituted off) 73'
Substitutions:
DF	20	Chidozie Awaziem	(substituted on) 42'
FW	7	Ahmed Musa	(substituted on) 58'
FW	9	Odion Ighalo	(substituted on) 73'
Manager:
(Germany) Gernot Rohr

GK	1	Jonathan Nahimana
RB	14	Omar Ngandu
CB	19	Frédéric Nsabiyumva
CB	8	Gaël Duhayindavyi
LB	15	Omar Moussa
DM	5	Gaël Bigirimana
RM	17	Cédric Amissi
CM	20	Francis Mustafa		(substituted off) 59'
LM	10	Shasiri Nahimana	(yellow card) 63'	(substituted off) 76'
CF	7	Fiston Abdul Razak
CF	18	Saido Berahino (c)		(substituted off) 90+2'
Substitutions:
FW	3	Elvis Kamsoba		(substituted on) 59'
DF	22	Christophe Nduwarugira		(substituted on) 76'
FW	21	Mohamed Amissi		(substituted on) 90+2'
Manager:
Olivier Niyungeko

Man of the Match:
Wilfred Ndidi (Nigeria)

Assistant referees:
Berhe Tesfagiorghis (Eritrea)
Mohammed Ibrahim (Sudan)
Fourth official:
Ahmad Heeralall (Mauritius)

=== Guinea vs Madagascar ===
22 June 2019
22:00

Guinea	2–2	Madagascar
Kaba 34'; Kamano 66' (pen.)	Report	Abel 49'; Andriamatsinoro 55'

Alexandria Stadium, Alexandria
Attendance: 5,342
Referee: Amin Omar (Egypt)

Guinea	Madagascar

GK	22	Aly Keita
RB	18	Mikael Dyrestam
CB	15	Julian Jeanvier
CB	6	Simon Falette
LB	3	Issiaga Sylla
DM	4	Amadou Diawara
CM	7	Mady Camara	(substituted off) 62'
CM	13	Ibrahima Cissé
RF	16	Ibrahima Traoré (c)
CF	21	Sory Kaba	(substituted off) 86'
LF	10	François Kamano	(substituted off) 78'
Substitutions:
MF	8	Naby Keïta	(substituted on) 62'
FW	19	Bengali-Fodé Koita	(substituted on) 78'
FW	2	Mohamed Yattara	(substituted on) 86'
Manager:
(Belgium) Paul Put

GK	23	Melvin Adrien
RB	20	Romain Métanire	(yellow card) 65'
CB	21	Thomas Fontaine
CB	5	Pascal Razakanantenaina
LB	15	Ibrahim Amada	(yellow card) 53'	(substituted off) 64'
DM	6	Marco Ilaimaharitra	(yellow card) 81'
CM	13	Anicet Abel
CM	12	Lalaïna Nomenjanahary
RF	2	Carolus Andriamatsinoro		(substituted off) 73'
CF	9	Faneva Imà Andriatsima (c)
LF	22	Jérôme Mombris
Substitutions:
MF	18	Rayan Raveloson		(substituted on) 64'
FW	11	Paulin Voavy		(substituted on) 73'
Manager:
(France) Nicolas Dupuis

Man of the Match:
Anicet Abel (Madagascar)

Assistant referees:
Mahmoud Abou El-Regal (Egypt)
Tahssen Abo El Sadat (Egypt)
Fourth official:
Ibrahim Nour El Din (Egypt)

=== Nigeria vs Guinea ===
26 June 2019
16:30

Nigeria	1–0	Guinea
Omeruo 73'	Report

Alexandria Stadium, Alexandria
Attendance: 10,388
Referee: Helder Martins de Carvalho (Angola)

Nigeria	Guinea

GK	1	Daniel Akpeyi
RB	22	Kenneth Omeruo
CB	6	Leon Balogun
CB	4	Wilfred Ndidi
LB	20	Chidozie Awaziem
RM	2	Ola Aina
CM	8	Peter Etebo	(yellow card) 90'
LM	15	Moses Simon		(substituted off) 90+4'
AM	18	Alex Iwobi		(substituted off) 78'
AM	7	Ahmed Musa (c)	(yellow card) 62'
CF	9	Odion Ighalo		(substituted off) 88'
Substitutions:
FW	13	Samuel Chukwueze		(substituted on) 78'
FW	14	Paul Onuachu		(substituted on) 88'
FW	17	Samuel Kalu		(substituted on) 90+4'
Manager:
(Germany) Gernot Rohr

GK	12	Ibrahim Koné
RB	18	Mikael Dyrestam		(substituted off) 73'
CB	5	Ernest Seka	(yellow card) 65'
CB	6	Simon Falette	(yellow card) 27'
LB	3	Issiaga Sylla
DM	4	Amadou Diawara
CM	8	Naby Keïta		(substituted off) 71'
CM	13	Ibrahima Cissé
RF	16	Ibrahima Traoré (c)
CF	21	Sory Kaba
LF	10	François Kamano		(substituted off) 82'
Substitutions:
FW	20	Lass Bangoura		(substituted on) 71'
DF	14	Ousmane Sidibé		(substituted on) 73'
FW	19	Bengali-Fodé Koita		(substituted on) 82'
Manager:
(Belgium) Paul Put

Man of the Match:
Kenneth Omeruo (Nigeria)

Assistant referees:
Jerson dos Santos (Angola)
Arsénio Maringule (Mozambique)
Fourth official:
Beida Dahane (Mauritania)

=== Madagascar vs Burundi ===
27 June 2019
16:30

Madagascar	1–0	Burundi
Ilaimaharitra 76'	Report

Alexandria Stadium, Alexandria
Attendance: 4,900
Referee: Haythem Guirat (Tunisia)

Madagascar	Burundi

GK	23	Melvin Adrien
RB	20	Romain Métanire
CB	21	Thomas Fontaine
CB	5	Pascal Razakanantenaina
LB	15	Ibrahim Amada		(substituted off) 61'
DM	6	Marco Ilaimaharitra
CM	13	Anicet Abel
CM	12	Lalaïna Nomenjanahary		(substituted off) 74'
RF	2	Carolus Andriamatsinoro		(substituted off) 51'
CF	9	Faneva Imà Andriatsima (c)
LF	22	Jérôme Mombris	(yellow card) 81'
Substitutions:
FW	11	Paulin Voavy		(substituted on) 51'
FW	10	Njiva Rakotoharimalala		(substituted on) 61'
MF	18	Rayan Raveloson		(substituted on) 74'
Manager:
(France) Nicolas Dupuis

GK	1	Jonathan Nahimana
RB	6	Karim Nizigiyimana
CB	22	Christophe Nduwarugira
CB	19	Frédéric Nsabiyumva
LB	14	Omar Ngandu
CM	5	Gaël Bigirimana
CM	8	Gaël Duhayindavyi
RW	10	Shassiri Nahimana		(substituted off) 46'
AM	7	Fiston Abdul Razak
LW	17	Cédric Amissi	(yellow card) 58'	(substituted off) 82'
CF	18	Saido Berahino (c)		(substituted off) 61'
Substitutions:
MF	2	Enock Sabumukama		(substituted on) 46'
FW	21	Mohamed Amissi		(substituted on) 61'
FW	9	Laudit Mavugo		(substituted on) 82'
Manager:
Olivier Niyungeko

Man of the Match:
Marco Ilaimaharitra (Madagascar)

Assistant referees:
Anouar Hmila (Tunisia)
Attia Amsaaed (Libya)
Fourth official:
Sadok Selmi (Tunisia)

=== Madagascar vs Nigeria ===
30 June 2019
18:00

Madagascar	2–0	Nigeria
Nomenjanahary 13'; Andriamatsinoro 53'	Report

Alexandria Stadium, Alexandria
Attendance: 9,895
Referee: Bakary Gassama (Gambia)

Madagascar	Nigeria

GK	23	Melvin Adrien
RB	20	Romain Métanire
CB	21	Thomas Fontaine
CB	5	Pascal Razakanantenaina		(substituted off) 74'
LB	15	Ibrahim Amada		(substituted off) 86'
DM	6	Marco Ilaimaharitra	(yellow card) 80'
CM	13	Anicet Abel
CM	12	Lalaïna Nomenjanahary
RF	2	Carolus Andriamatsinoro
CF	9	Faneva Imà Andriatsima (c)		(substituted off) 62'
LF	22	Jérôme Mombris
Substitutions:
FW	19	William Gros		(substituted on) 62'
DF	4	Gervais Randrianarisoa		(substituted on) 74'
MF	18	Rayan Raveloson		(substituted on) 86'
Manager:
(France) Nicolas Dupuis

GK	1	Ikechukwu Ezenwa
CB	6	Leon Balogun
CB	5	William Troost-Ekong
CB	20	Chidozie Awaziem
DM	10	John Obi Mikel (c)	(substituted off) 59'
RM	2	Ola Aina
CM	19	John Ogu	(substituted off) 46'
CM	8	Peter Etebo
LM	7	Ahmed Musa
SS	17	Samuel Kalu	(substituted off) 73'
CF	9	Odion Ighalo
Substitutions:
MF	4	Wilfred Ndidi	(substituted on) 46'
MF	18	Alex Iwobi	(substituted on) 59'
FW	15	Moses Simon	(substituted on) 73'
Manager:
(Germany) Gernot Rohr

Man of the Match:
Carolus Andriamatsinoro (Madagascar)

Assistant referees:
Zakhele Thusi Siwela (South Africa)
El Hadji Malick Samba (Senegal)
Fourth official:
Issa Sy (Senegal)

=== Burundi vs Guinea ===
30 June 2019
18:00

Burundi	0–2	Guinea
	Report	Yattara 25', 52'

Al Salam Stadium, Cairo
Attendance: 5,753
Referee: Noureddine El Jaafari (Morocco)

Burundi	Guinea

GK	1	Jonathan Nahimana
RB	6	Karim Nizigiyimana	(yellow card) 69'
CB	14	Omar Ngandu
CB	19	Frédéric Nsabiyumva
LB	22	Christophe Nduwarugira	(red card) 12'
CM	5	Gaël Bigirimana (c)
CM	4	Pierre Kwizera
RW	12	Hussein Shabani
AM	20	Francis Mustafa		(substituted off) 16'
LW	21	Mohamed Amissi		(substituted off) 57'
CF	7	Fiston Abdul Razak		(substituted off) 68'
Substitutions:
MF	8	Gaël Duhayindavyi	(yellow card) 76'	(substituted on) 16'
FW	17	Cédric Amissi		(substituted on) 57'
FW	18	Saido Berahino		(substituted on) 68'
Manager:
Olivier Niyungeko

GK	12	Ibrahim Koné
RB	18	Mikael Dyrestam
CB	5	Ernest Seka
CB	6	Simon Falette
LB	3	Issiaga Sylla	(yellow card) 18'
DM	4	Amadou Diawara
RM	16	Ibrahima Traoré (c)
CM	13	Ibrahima Cissé
LM	10	François Kamano		(substituted off) 63'
CF	2	Mohamed Yattara		(substituted off) 79'
CF	21	Sory Kaba		(substituted off) 85'
Substitutions:
FW	20	Lass Bangoura		(substituted on) 63'
FW	9	José Kanté		(substituted on) 79'
MF	7	Mady Camara		(substituted on) 85'
Manager:
(Belgium) Paul Put

Man of the Match:

Assistant referees:
Azgaou Lahcen (Morocco)
Mustapha Akarkad (Morocco)
Fourth official:
Youssef Essrayri (Tunisia)
