= Madagascar at the Africa Cup of Nations =

Madagascar participated once in the Africa Cup of Nations in 2019 in Egypt. On 16 October 2018, Madagascar qualified to the 2019 Africa Cup of Nations for the first time in their history, after they won 1–0 against Equatorial Guinea. During their debut match against Guinea on 22 June 2019, Anicet Abel scored Madagascar's first-ever AFCON goal and secured their first point of the competition with a 2–2 draw against Guinea. The team defeated Burundi in their second match and followed it up with a 2–0 victory over the Super Eagles of Nigeria to top Group B. Then Madagascar advanced to quarter-finals after beating DR Congo in the round of 16. The team's successful performance was coined by pundits as the Iceland of Africa, resembling the shockingly successful debut of Iceland in UEFA Euro 2016. However, Madagascar's dream ended abruptly after suffering a 0–3 defeat at the hand of another former champion, Tunisia.

== Overall record ==
Africa Cup of Nations record									Qualification record					
Year	Round	Position	Pld	W	D*	L	GF	GA	Pld	W	D	L	GF	GA
(Sudan) 1957	Part of France								Part of France					
(United Arab Republic) 1959	Part of France								Part of France					
(Ethiopia) 1962	Not affiliated to CAF								Not affiliated to CAF					
(Ghana) 1963	Not affiliated to CAF								Not affiliated to CAF					
(Tunisia) 1965	Did not enter								Did not enter					
(Ethiopia) 1968	Did not enter								Did not enter					
(Sudan) 1970	Did not enter								Did not enter					
(Cameroon) 1972	Did not qualify								2	1	0	1	3	5
(Egypt) 1974	Did not qualify								2	1	0	1	3	4
(Ethiopia) 1976	Withdrew								Withdrew					
(Ghana) 1978	Did not enter								Did not enter					
(Nigeria) 1980	Did not qualify								2	1	0	1	3	6
(Libya) 1982	Did not qualify								4	2	1	1	4	7
(Ivory Coast) 1984	Did not qualify								4	1	1	2	3	4
(Egypt) 1986	Did not qualify								2	0	0	2	2	6
(Morocco) 1988	Did not qualify								2	1	0	1	2	3
(Algeria) 1990	Withdrew								Withdrew					
(Senegal) 1992	Did not qualify								5	2	2	1	3	2
(Tunisia) 1994	Did not enter								Did not enter					
(South Africa) 1996	Withdrew during qualifiers								Withdrew during qualifiers					
(Burkina Faso) 1998	Banned for withdrawal in 1996								Banned for withdrawal in 1996					
(Ghana) (Nigeria) 2000	Did not qualify								8	2	3	3	9	12
(Mali) 2002	Did not qualify								8	2	2	4	7	8
(Tunisia) 2004	Did not qualify								4	2	0	2	2	8
(Egypt) 2006	Did not qualify								2	0	1	1	3	4
(Ghana) 2008	Did not qualify								4	0	0	4	0	14
(Angola) 2010	Did not qualify								8	3	3	2	12	9
(Gabon) 2012	Did not qualify								6	0	1	5	4	14
(South Africa) 2013	Did not qualify								2	0	0	2	1	7
(Equatorial Guinea) 2015	Did not qualify								2	1	0	1	2	2
(Gabon) 2017	Did not qualify								6	0	3	3	5	12
(Egypt) 2019	Quarter-finals	6th	5	2	2	1	7	7	8	5	1	2	12	10
(Cameroon) 2021	Did not qualify								6	2	2	2	9	9
(Ivory Coast) 2023	Did not qualify								6	0	3	3	1	9
(Morocco) 2025	Did not qualify								6	0	2	4	4	8
(Kenya) (Tanzania) (Uganda) 2027	To be determined								To be determined					
2029	To be determined								To be determined					
Total	Quarter-finals	1/35	5	2	2	1	7	7	99	26	25	48	94	163

== Tournaments ==
=== 2019 Africa Cup of Nations ===
==== Group stage ====
Pos	Team	Pld	W	D	L	GF	GA	GD	Pts	Qualification
1	Madagascar	3	2	1	0	5	2	+3	7	Advance to knockout stage
2	Nigeria	3	2	0	1	2	2	0	6	Advance to knockout stage
3	Guinea	3	1	1	1	4	3	+1	4	Advance to knockout stage
4	Burundi	3	0	0	3	0	4	−4	0	

Source: CAF
Rules for classification: Tiebreakers
22 June 2019
22:00

Guinea	2–2	Madagascar
Kaba 34'; Kamano 66' (pen.)	Report	Abel 49'; Andriamatsinoro 55'

Alexandria Stadium, Alexandria
Attendance: 5,342
Referee: Amin Omar (Egypt)

27 June 2019
16:30

Madagascar	1–0	Burundi
Ilaimaharitra 76'	Report

Alexandria Stadium, Alexandria
Attendance: 4,900
Referee: Haythem Guirat (Tunisia)

30 June 2019
18:00

Madagascar	2–0	Nigeria
Nomenjanahary 13'; Andriamatsinoro 53'	Report

Alexandria Stadium, Alexandria
Attendance: 9,895
Referee: Bakary Gassama (Gambia)

==== Round of 16 ====
7 July 2019
18:00

Madagascar	2–2 (a.e.t.)	DR Congo
Amada 9'; Andriatsima 77'	Report	Bakambu 21'; Mbemba 90'
Penalties
Amada (penalty scored); Métanire (penalty scored); Fontaine (penalty scored); Mombris (penalty scored)	4–2	(penalty missed) Tisserand; (penalty scored) Bakambu; (penalty scored) M'Poku; (penalty missed) Bolasie

Alexandria Stadium, Alexandria
Attendance: 5,890
Referee: Noureddine El Jaafari (Morocco)

==== Quarter-finals ====
11 July 2019
21:00

Madagascar	0–3	Tunisia
	Report	Sassi 52'; Msakni 60'; Sliti 90+3'

Al Salam Stadium, Cairo
Attendance: 7,568
Referee: Sidi Alioum (Cameroon)

== Goalscorers ==
Rank	Player	2019	Goals
1	Carolus Andriamatsinoro	2	2
2	Anicet Abel	1	1
2	Ibrahim Amada	1	1
2	Faneva Imà Andriatsima	1	1
2	Marco Ilaimaharitra	1	1
2	Lalaïna Nomenjanahary	1	1
	Total	7	

– Best goalscorer(s) of the team

== Kits ==
2019 Africa Cup of Nations
Home	Away
