= Burundi at the Africa Cup of Nations =

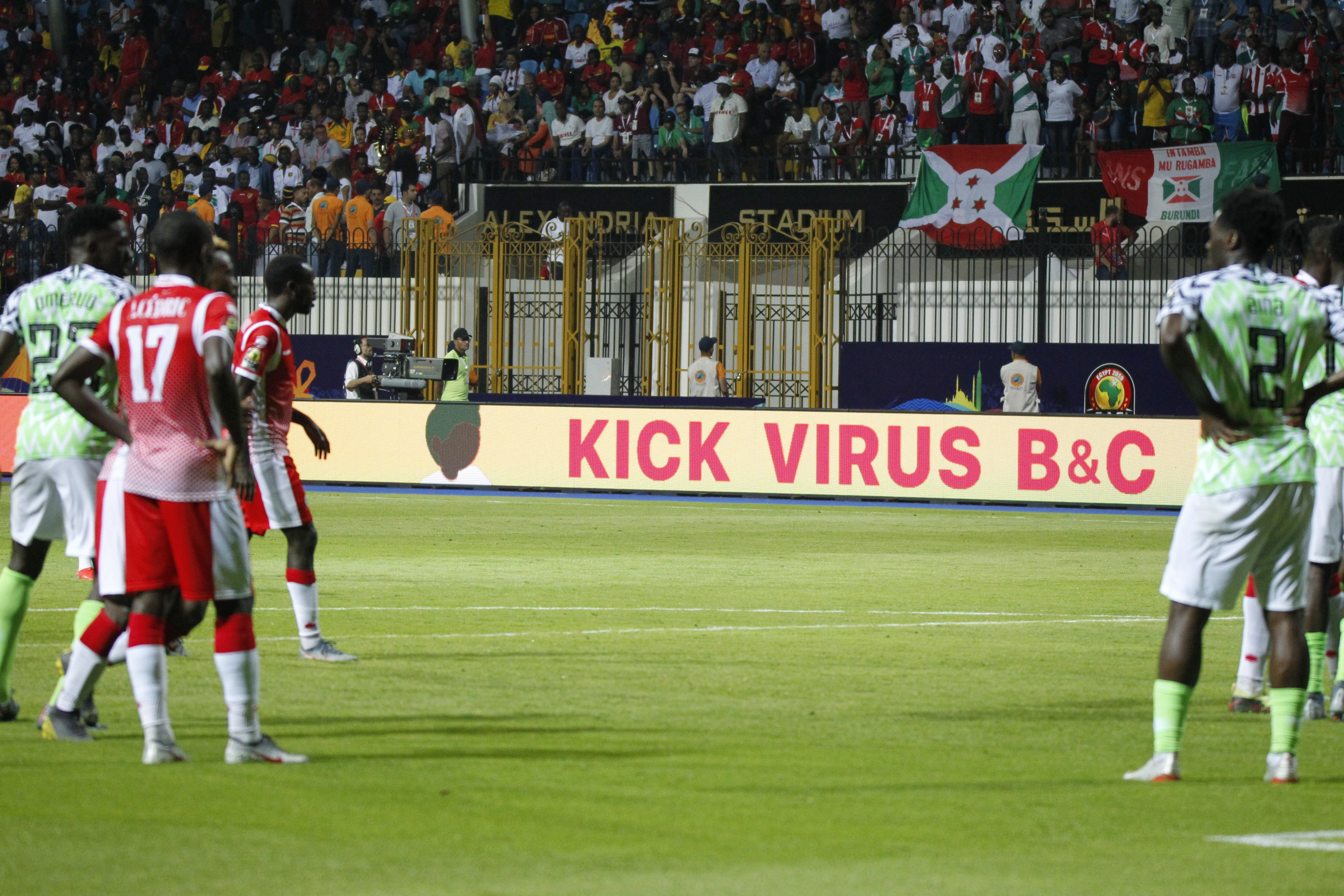
Burundi against Nigeria at the 2019 Africa Cup of Nations.

Burundi participated once in the Africa Cup of Nations in 2019 in Egypt. The team qualified on 23 March 2019 as the Group C runners-up of the qualification. In the finals, the team was eliminated from the group stage and ranked 22nd out of 24 participants, after finishing bottom of Group B and suffering three defeats while not scoring any goals and conceding four goals.

== Overall record ==
Africa Cup of Nations record
Year	Round	Position	Pld	W	D*	L	GF	GA
(Sudan) 1957 to (Ethiopia) 1962	Part of Belgium							
(Ghana) 1963 to (Cameroon) 1972	Not affiliated to CAF							
(Egypt) 1974	Did not enter							
(Ethiopia) 1976	Did not qualify							
(Ghana) 1978	Did not enter							
(Nigeria) 1980	Withdrew							
(Libya) 1982 to (Senegal) 1992	Did not enter							
(Tunisia) 1994	Did not qualify							
(South Africa) 1996	Did not enter							
(Burkina Faso) 1998	Withdrew							
(Ghana) (Nigeria) 2000 to (Gabon) 2017	Did not qualify							
(Egypt) 2019	Group stage	22nd	3	0	0	3	0	4
(Cameroon) 2021 to (Morocco) 2025	Did not qualify							
(Kenya) (Tanzania) (Uganda) 2027	To be determined							
2029	To be determined							
Total	Group stage	1/35	3	0	0	3	0	4

== Tournaments ==
=== 2019 Africa Cup of Nations ===
==== Group stage ====
Pos	Team	Pld	W	D	L	GF	GA	GD	Pts	Qualification
1	Madagascar	3	2	1	0	5	2	+3	7	Advance to knockout stage
2	Nigeria	3	2	0	1	2	2	0	6	Advance to knockout stage
3	Guinea	3	1	1	1	4	3	+1	4	Advance to knockout stage
4	Burundi	3	0	0	3	0	4	−4	0	

Source: CAF
Rules for classification: Tiebreakers
22 June 2019
19:00

Nigeria	1–0	Burundi
Ighalo 77'	Report

Alexandria Stadium, Alexandria
Attendance: 3,192
Referee: Bernard Camille (Seychelles)

27 June 2019
16:30

Madagascar	1–0	Burundi
Ilaimaharitra 76'	Report

Alexandria Stadium, Alexandria
Attendance: 4,900
Referee: Haythem Guirat (Tunisia)

30 June 2019
18:00

Burundi	0–2	Guinea
	Report	Yattara 25', 52'

Al Salam Stadium, Cairo
Attendance: 5,753
Referee: Noureddine El Jaafari (Morocco)

== Kits ==
2019 Africa Cup of Nations
Home	Away
