= Aleksandr Rakitsky =

Soviet association football player

Personal information
- Full name: Aleksandr Pavlovich Rakitsky
- Date of birth: 1 July 1946 (age 80)
- Place of birth: Russia, Soviet Union
- Height: 1.78 m (5 ft 10 in)
- Position: Goalkeeper

Managerial career
- Years: Team
- AS Inter Star
- 1993–1996: Burundi

Aleksandr Pavlovich Rakitsky (Russian: Александр Павлович Ракитский; born 1 July 1946 in Russia) is a Russian football manager who last worked as head coach of the Burundi national football team. He is a former player.

== Career ==
Rakitsky started his managerial career with AS Inter Star. In 1993, he was appointed head coach of the Burundi national football team, a position he held until 1996.
