= Francis Mustafa =

Burundian footballer

Personal information
- Full name: Francis Ndjali Mustafa
- Date of birth: 3 May 1996 (age 30)
- Position: Midfielder

Team information
- Current team: Chicken Inn

Senior career*
Years	Team	Apps	(Gls)
2014–2016	Muzinga		
2016–2017	Kiyovu Sports		
2018–2019	Gor Mahia		
2019–2020	Bugesera		
2020–2021	Simba		
2021–2022	Coastal Union		
2022–2026	Zanaco		
2026–	Chicken Inn		

International career^{‡}
2015–	Burundi	10	(0)
- * Club domestic league appearances and goals ‡ National team caps and goals as of 4 August 2020

Francis Ndjali Mustafa (born 3 May 1996) is a Burundian football player. He plays for Zimbabwe Premier Soccer League club Chicken Inn. His last name is spelled Moustapha in some sources.

== International ==
He made his Burundi national football team debut on 17 October 2015 in a 2016 African Nations Championship qualification game against Ethiopia.

He was selected for the 2019 Africa Cup of Nations squad.
