= Baudouin Ribakare =

Burundian professional football manager

Personal information
- Date of birth: 28 February 1956 (age 70)
- Place of birth: Burundi

Managerial career
- Years: Team
- 1992: Burundi
- 2000–2006: TSV Oberhaunstadt
- 1997–2004: Burundi

Baudouin Ribakare is a Burundian professional football manager.

== Career ==
Since 1992 until 2000, he coached the Burundi national football team. Summer 2000, he was named new coach of the TSV Oberhaunstadt. In 2003-2004, he was called from Germany to rescue the Burundi national football team.
