= Omar Ngandu =

Burundian footballer

Personal information
- Date of birth: 23 December 1996 (age 29)
- Place of birth: Kibagabaga, Rwanda
- Height: 1.88 m (6 ft 2 in)
- Position: Defender

Senior career*
| Years | Team | Apps | (Gls) |
| 2013–2015 | Académie Tchité | | |
| 2015–2016 | Atlético Olympic | | |
| 2016–2017 | APR | | |
| 2017–2019 | AS Kigali | | |
| 2019–2020 | Al-Bashayer | | |
| 2020–2021 | Kiyovu Sports | | |
| 2021–2022 | Bumamuru | | |
| 2024–2025 | Brodd | 12 | (3) |

International career^{‡}
| 2018–2019 | Burundi | 11 | (0) |
- * Club domestic league appearances and goals as of 11 July 2026 ‡ National team caps and goals as of 19 March 2025

Omar Ngandu (born 23 December 1996) is a Burundian footballer who last played for Norwegian club Brodd.

== Club career ==
In 2024, he signed for Norwegian Third Division club Brodd.

== International career ==
He made his Burundi national football team debut on 2 September 2018 in a friendly against Ethiopia.

He was selected for the squad for the 2019 Africa Cup of Nations.
