= Anicet Abel =

Malagasy footballer

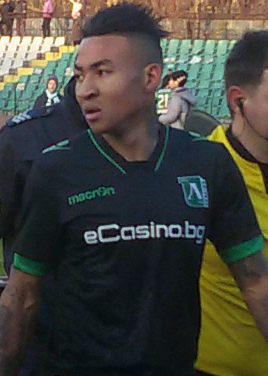

Personal information
- Full name: Anicet Abel Andrianantenaina
- Date of birth: 13 March 1990 (age 36)
- Place of birth: Antananarivo, Madagascar
- Height: 1.79 m (5 ft 10 in)
- Position: Central midfielder

Youth career
- 2002–2004: Ajesaia
- 2004–2008: Auxerre

Senior career*
| Years | Team | Apps | (Gls) |
| 2008–2011 | Auxerre B | 42 | (4) |
| 2011–2012 | Chernomorets Burgas | 11 | (6) |
| 2012–2013 | CSKA Sofia | 26 | (6) |
| 2013–2014 | Botev Plovdiv | 35 | (10) |
| 2014–2021 | Ludogorets Razgrad | 148 | (11) |
| 2021–2022 | Future FC | 5 | (0) |
| 2022–2023 | Beroe | 11 | (0) |
| 2023 | Maccabi Bnei Reineh | 11 | (0) |
| Total | | 289 | (37) |

International career^{‡}
| 2015–2021 | Madagascar | 19 | (3) |
- * Club domestic league appearances and goals as of 17 May 2023 ‡ National team caps and goals as of 20 July 2022 (UTC)

Anicet Abel Andrianantenaina (born 13 March 1990) is a Malagasy retired professional footballer who played as a midfielder.

== Career ==
=== AJ Auxerre ===
Born in Antananarivo, Anicet began his career in his home town with Ajesaia. In 2004, he joined the youth ranks of AJ Auxerre and was promoted to the Auxerre B side by 2008. Anicet earned 42 appearances and scored four goals for Auxerre B in the Championnat de France amateur. His last goal came in a 2–0 home win against Lyon-Duchère, scoring at the 55th minute, after which he was subbed out in the 90th minute for Bernard Onanga Itoua.

=== Chernomorets Burgas ===
On 8 September 2011, Anicet joined Bulgarian side Chernomorets Burgas on a free transfer. He signed a three-year deal. Two days later, Anicet made his A Group debut in a 4–0 home win over Vidima-Rakovski. He scored his first goal in a Chernomorets shirt against Svetkavitsa on 17 September in a 3–0 away win, scoring from a shot from 20 meters out. On 6 January 2012 he leaves Chernomorets with the pretext that he will retire. Anicet became subject of a transfer dispute between CSKA Sofia and Chernomorets Burgas, after his announcing as a CSKA player on 23 January 2012.

=== CSKA Sofia ===
On 19 July 2012, Anicet made his CSKA Sofia and European debut in a 0–0 away draw against ND Mura in the 2012–13 UEFA Europa League second qualifying round. On 19 August 2012, Anicet made his league debut in a 1–1 away draw against his previous club Chernomorets Burgas. On 15 September 2012, he scored his first goal for the club in a 3–0 home win against Botev Vratsa. Scoring from the spot in the 26th minute, after Nilson was fouled inside the penalty area by Martin Vasilev. He scored his second goal for the club in the same match, after he headed-in at the 62nd minute mark from a cross from Sérginho. Till the end of the season he scored 6 league goals for the club in 26 appearances.

=== Botev Plovdiv ===
On 26 June 2013, Anicet was surprisingly acquired by Botev Plovdiv prior to the start of the 2013–14 A Group season. On 4 July 2013, he made his Botev Plovdiv debut in a 1–0 away win against Astana in the 2013–14 UEFA Europa League first qualifying round. On 21 July 2013, Anicet made his league debut in a 2–1 home win against Levski Sofia. Seven days later, on 28 July 2013, he scored his first goal for the club in a 7–1 home win against Pirin Gotse Delchev, heading in, five minutes into the second half from a cross from Boris Galchev, after he was subbed in at the end of first half for Mariyan Ognyanov. On 14 September 2013, he scored his first brace for the club in a 2–0 derby home win over city rivals Lokomotiv Plovdiv, his first, a goal in the 18th minute from a pass from Todor Nedelev, and his second, finishing a counterattack in the 55th minute, started by club captain Veselin Minev. During his spell in Plovdiv, Anicet established himself as an important player of the team, helping Botev reach the 2014 Bulgarian Cup Final and a Europa League spot with 10 goals in 35 appearances.

=== Ludogorets Razgrad ===
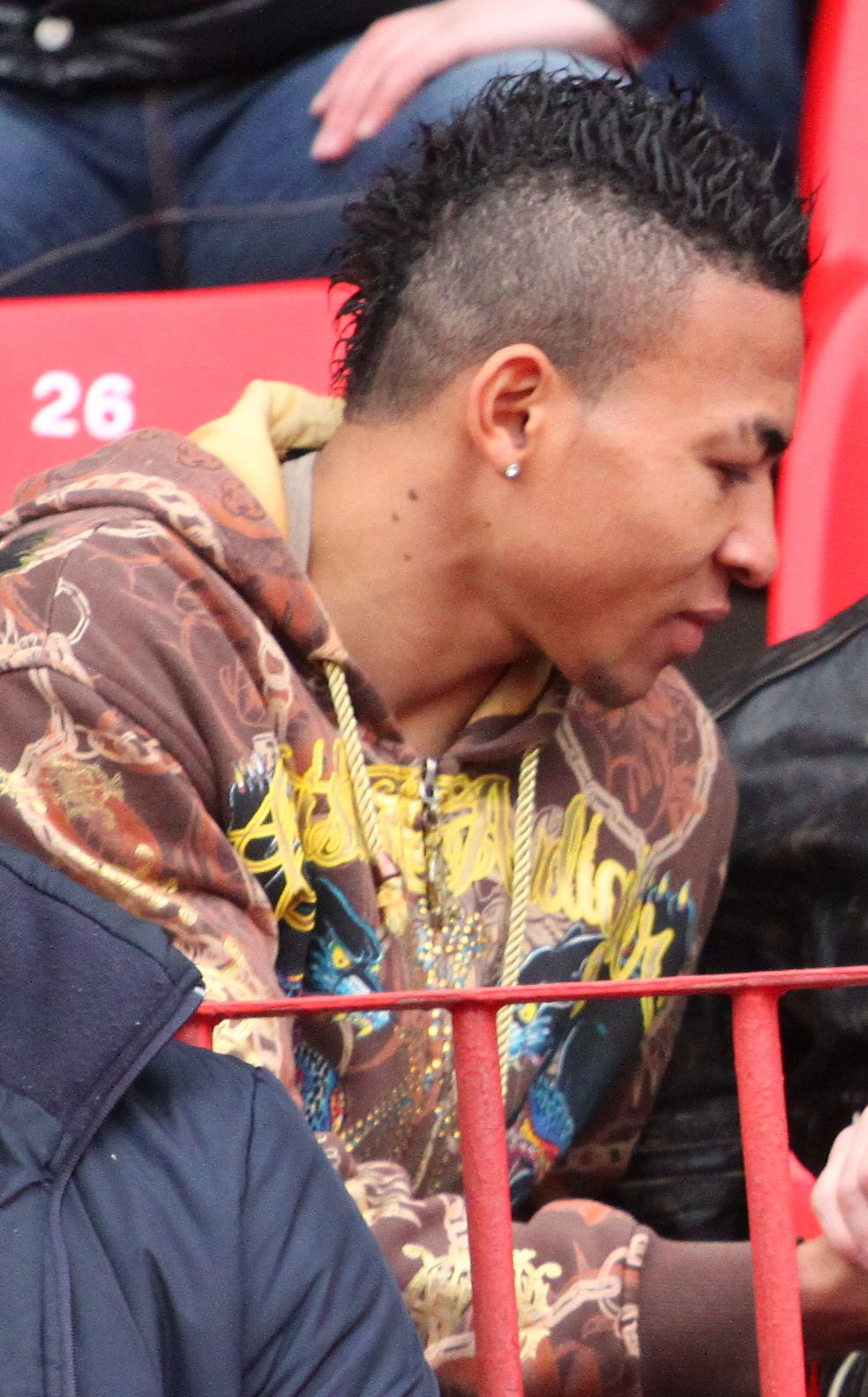
Anicet in 2012

In July 2014, Anicet joined the defending champions Ludogorets Razgrad, as an aftermath of the financial uncertainty in Botev Plovdiv. On 16 July 2014, Anicet made his Ludogorets and UEFA Champions League debut in a 4–0 home win against Luxembourgish side F91 Dudelange, after he was subbed in for Marcelinho at the 63rd minute mark. Three minutes later, he scored his first goal for the club, finishing low after being picked out by Virgil Misidjan. On 19 July 2014, he made his league debut in a 1–0 away loss against Haskovo. On 23 August 2014, he scored his first league goal for Ludogorets in a 2–2 away draw against Lokomotiv Sofia. Anicet opened the scoring in the 9th minute, and later scored his second in the 83rd minute. On 16 September 2014, he made his UEFA Champions League group stage debut in a 2–1 away loss to Premier League side Liverpool. He helped Ludogorets win the league in his debut season, scoring 3 league goals in 22 appearances.

After winning the league again in the following season, Ludogorets qualified for the 2016–17 UEFA Champions League group stage, after beating OFK Titograd and Red Star Belgrade in the qualifiers. Ludogorets finished third in the group, 1 point ahead of Basel and qualified for the Europa League knockout stage. He played in both the matches against Danish Superliga side Copenhagen, as Ludogorets got knocked out of the tournament in the round of 32.

On 20 July 2021 Anicet announced that he is leaving Ludogorets after 7 years, due to mutual agreement, thanking everyone at the club for his experiences there.

=== Future FC ===
In late October 2021 he joined Egyptian Premier League club Future FC. He only had 5 appearances for the club and did not score or assist in any goals.

=== Beroe ===
In August 2022, Anicet returned to Bulgaria, signing a contract with Beroe.

=== Maccabi Bnei Reineh ===
On 24 January 2023 he signed for the Israeli Premier League club Maccabi Bnei Reineh.

== International career ==
His first call-up to the Madagascar national side was on 4 July 2007. On 6 September 2015, Anicet made his national team debut in a 0–0 draw against Angola in the 2017 Africa Cup of Nations qualification. One month later, on 13 October 2015, he scored his first ever senior international goal in a 2–2 draw against the Central African Republic in the 2018 FIFA World Cup qualification first round.

On 12 June 2019, he was named in Madagascar's 23-man squad for the 2019 Africa Cup of Nations in Egypt. On 22 June 2019, at the 49th minute mark, in the opening match against Guinea, he rose at the near post and headed in from a corner to score Madagascar's first ever goal in the Africa Cup of Nations. He was subsequently voted as the Man of the Match for his performance.

== Career statistics ==
=== Club ===
As of 30 June 2023

Appearances and goals by club, season and competition
| Club | Season | League | | | Cup | | Europe | | Super Cup | | Total | | Ref. |
| Club | Season | Division | Apps | Goals | Apps | Goals | Apps | Goals | Apps | Goals | Apps | Goals | Ref. |
|---|---|---|---|---|---|---|---|---|---|---|---|---|---|
| Auxerre B | 2008–09 | National 2 | 2 | 0 | — | | — | | — | | 2 | 0 | |
| Auxerre B | 2009–10 | National 2 | 21 | 3 | — | | — | | — | | 21 | 3 | |
| Auxerre B | 2010–11 | National 2 | 25 | 1 | — | | — | | — | | 25 | 1 | |
| Auxerre B | Total | | 48 | 4 | 0 | 0 | 0 | 0 | 0 | 0 | 48 | 4 | – |
| Chernomorets Burgas | 2011–12 | First League | 11 | 6 | 1 | 0 | — | | — | | 12 | 6 | |
| Chernomorets Burgas | Total | | 11 | 6 | 1 | 0 | 0 | 0 | 0 | 0 | 12 | 6 | – |
| CSKA Sofia | 2012–13 | First League | 26 | 6 | 4 | 2 | 2 | 0 | 0 | 0 | 32 | 8 | |
| CSKA Sofia | Total | | 26 | 6 | 4 | 2 | 2 | 0 | 0 | 0 | 32 | 8 | – |
| Botev Plovdiv | 2013–14 | First League | 35 | 10 | 9 | 1 | 6 | 0 | 0 | 0 | 50 | 11 | |
| Botev Plovdiv | Total | | 35 | 10 | 9 | 1 | 6 | 0 | 0 | 0 | 50 | 11 | – |
| Ludogorets Razgrad | 2014–15 | First League | 22 | 3 | 6 | 0 | 8 | 1 | 0 | 0 | 36 | 4 | |
| Ludogorets Razgrad | 2015–16 | First League | 21 | 0 | 1 | 0 | 1 | 0 | 1 | 0 | 24 | 0 | |
| Ludogorets Razgrad | 2016–17 | Parva Liga | 25 | 1 | 5 | 1 | 11 | 0 | 0 | 0 | 41 | 2 | |
| Ludogorets Razgrad | 2017–18 | Parva Liga | 24 | 5 | 2 | 0 | 14 | 1 | 1 | 0 | 41 | 6 | |
| Ludogorets Razgrad | 2018–19 | Parva Liga | 15 | 0 | 1 | 0 | 0 | 0 | 0 | 0 | 16 | 0 | |
| Ludogorets Razgrad | 2019–20 | Parva Liga | 22 | 1 | 2 | 0 | 12 | 1 | 0 | 0 | 36 | 2 | |
| Ludogorets Razgrad | 2020–21 | Parva Liga | 21 | 1 | 5 | 1 | 7 | 0 | 1 | 0 | 34 | 2 | |
| Ludogorets Razgrad | Total | | 148 | 11 | 22 | 2 | 53 | 3 | 3 | 0 | 226 | 16 | |
| Future | 2021–22 | Egyptian Premier League | 5 | 0 | 0 | 0 | 0 | 0 | 0 | 0 | 5 | 0 | |
| Future | Total | | 5!0 | 0 | 0 | 0 | 0 | 0 | 0 | 5 | 0 | | |
| Beroe Stara Zagora | 2022–23 | Parva Liga | 11 | 0 | 0 | 0 | 0 | 0 | 0 | 0 | 11 | 0 | |
| Beroe Stara Zagora | Total | | 11!0 | 0 | 0 | 0 | 0 | 0 | 0 | 11 | 0 | | |
| Maccabi Bnei Reineh | 2022–23 | Israeli Premier League | 11 | 0 | 0 | 0 | 0 | 0 | 0 | 0 | 11 | 0 | |
| Maccabi Bnei Reineh | Total | | 11 | 0 | 0 | 0 | 0 | 0 | 0 | 0 | 11 | 0 | |
| Career total | | | 297 | 37 | 36 | 5 | 61 | 3 | 3 | 0 | 395 | 45 | – |

=== International ===
As of 20 November 2019

| National team | Year | Apps | Goals |
|---|---|---|---|
| Madagascar | 2015 | 5 | 1 |
| Madagascar | 2017 | 1 | 0 |
| Madagascar | 2019 | 9 | 2 |
| Total | | 15 | 3 |

=== International goals ===
Scores and results list Madagascar's goal tally first.

| No. | Date | Venue | Opponent | Score | Result | Competition |
|---|---|---|---|---|---|---|
| 1. | 13 October 2015 | Mahamasina Municipal Stadium, Antananarivo, Madagascar | Central African Republic | 2–1 | 2–2 | 2018 FIFA World Cup qualification |
| 2. | 22 June 2019 | Alexandria Stadium, Alexandria, Egypt | Guinea | 1–1 | 2–2 | 2019 Africa Cup of Nations |
| 3. | 20 November 2019 | Stade Général Seyni Kountché, Niamey, Niger | Niger | 3–1 | 6–2 | 2021 Africa Cup of Nations qualification |

== Honours ==
Ludogorets Razgrad

- Bulgarian First League (7): 2014–15, 2015–16, 2016–17, 2017–18, 2018–19, 2019–20, 2020–21
- Bulgarian Supercup (2): 2018, 2019

=== Individual ===
National Team

- Man of the Match Guinea group B (1): Africa Cup Of Nations Egypt 2019
- Group Stage best squad (1): Africa Cup Of Nations Egypt 2019
- Man of the Match DR Congo round of 16 (1): Africa Cup Of Nations Egypt 2019
- Knight Order of Madagascar: 2019

=== Record ===
- First Malagasy player to play UEFA Champions League : 2014
- First Malagasy player to score a goal in UEFA Champions League (First match) : 2014
- First Malagasy player to score a goal in Africa Cup of Nations (First match) : 2019

== Personal ==
In November 2020, Anicet was one of a number of Ludogorets players who tested positive for COVID-19.
