= Olivier Niyungeko =

Burundian football coach (born 1970)

Personal information
- Full name: Alain Olivier Niyungeko
- Date of birth: 10 October 1970 (age 56)
- Place of birth: Burundi

Managerial career
- Years: Team
- Lydia Ludic
- Flambeau de l'Est
- 2016–2019: Burundi

Alain Olivier Niyungeko (born 10 October 1970) is a Burundian football coach, who was last manager of Burundi.

== Managerial career ==
During the 2012–13 season, Niyungeko led Flambeau de l'Est to their first Burundi Premier League title, three years after formation.

In 2016, Niyungeko was appointed manager of Burundi, replacing Ahcene Aït-Abdelmalek.
