= Nicolas Dupuis =

French footballer and manager (born 1968)

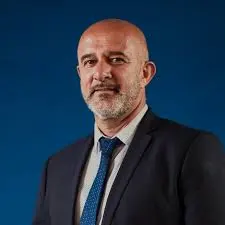

Personal information
- Date of birth: 6 January 1968 (age 58)
- Place of birth: Moulins, France
- Position: Full-back

Senior career*
Years	Team	Apps	(Gls)
- FC Souvigny
1982–1986	AS Yzeure		
- Cournon-d'Auvergne
- US Beaumont
1992–1994	SA Thiers		

Managerial career
- 1996–2011: AS Yzeure
- 2012–2017: AS Yzeure
- 2017–2021: Madagascar
- 2019–2020: Fleury (technical director)
- 2019–2022: Madagascar
- 2023–2026: South Sudan
- * Club domestic league appearances and goals

Nicolas Dupuis (born 6 January 1968) is a French football manager and former player who was the manager of the South Sudan national team.

== Club career ==
Dupuis played amateur football in Auvergne-Rhône-Alpes for FC Souvigny, AS Yzeure, Cournon-d'Auvergne, US Beaumont and SA Thiers. At Yzeure, Dupuis played and managed 682 matches in all competitions.

== Managerial career ==
In August 1996, Dupuis became the manager of Yzeure. During his time at the club, Yzeure were promoted to the Championnat National in 2006, as well as beating Ligue 1 club Lorient 1–0 in the 2013–14 Coupe de France on 4 January 2014, before losing to Lyon 3–1 on 22 January 2014 in the round of 32.

In March 2017, Dupuis was appointed the manager of the Madagascar national team. On 16 October 2018, Madagascar qualified for the 2019 Africa Cup of Nations after beating Equatorial Guinea 1–0 in Antananarivo, marking the nation's first ever AFCON appearance. The team went on to reach the quarter-finals.

In January 2019, it was announced that Dupuis would combine his role as Madagascar manager with that of French club FC Fleury 91's technical director. In March 2019, Madagascar extended his contract until after the 2019 AFCON. His contract expired in July 2019, but in September 2019, it was extended for four more years.

In April 2021, the Malagasy Football Federation suspended Dupuis without pay for "neglecting his managerial duties in order to pursue commercial interests for personal publicity", with Éric Rabésandratana taking charge of the national team whilst Dupuis served his suspension.

== Managerial statistics ==
As of match played 25 November 2025

Managerial record by team and tenure
Team	Nat	From	To	Record					Ref.
Team	Nat	From	To	G	W	D	L	Win %	Ref.
South Sudan		2023	2026	23	4	8	11	17.39	
Career Total				23	4	8	11	17.39	—
