= Omar Moussa (footballer) =

Footballer from Burundi

Personal information
- Date of birth: 30 August 1997 (age 29)
- Place of birth: Bujumbura, Burundi
- Height: 1.78 m (5 ft 10 in)
- Position: Defender

Team information
- Current team: Police Kibungo

Senior career*
Years	Team	Apps	(Gls)
2013–2015	Flambeau de l'Est		
2015–2016	Vital'O		
2016–2017	Atlético Olympic		
2017	Bugesera		
2018–2019	Sofapaka		
2019–	Police Kibungo		

International career^{‡}
2017–	Burundi	19	(0)
- * Club domestic league appearances and goals ‡ National team caps and goals as of 22 June 2019

Omar Moussa (born 30 August 1997) is a Burundian football player. He plays in Rwanda for Police Kibungo.

== International ==
He made his Burundi national football team debut on 11 March 2017 in a friendly against Djibouti, as a starter.

He was selected for the country's 2019 Africa Cup of Nations squad.
