= Jonathan Nahimana =

Burundian footballer (born 1999)

Personal information
- Date of birth: 12 December 1999 (age 26)
- Place of birth: Bujumbura, Burundi
- Height: 1.90 m (6 ft 3 in)
- Position: Goalkeeper

Senior career*
Years	Team	Apps	(Gls)
2015–2018	Vital'O		
2018–2020	Kinondoni Municipal Council		

International career^{‡}
2017–	Burundi	23	(0)
- * Club domestic league appearances and goals ‡ National team caps and goals as of 27 October 2020

Jonathan Nahimana (born 12 December 1999) is a Burundian professional footballer who plays as a goalkeeper for the Burundi national football team.
