= Ahcene Aït-Abdelmalek =

German-born Algerian football coach (born 1975)

Personal information
- Full name: Ahcène Aït-Abdelmalek
- Date of birth: 1 January 1975 (age 51)
- Place of birth: Germany
- Height: 1.80 m (5 ft 11 in)
- Position: Defender

Managerial career
- Years: Team
- 2015–2016: Burundi
- 2018: South Sudan

Ahcene Aït-Abdelmalek is a German-born Algerian football coach who coached Burundi from 2015 to 2016. He was appointed a new coach for South Sudan in February 2018, leaving in September 2018.
