= Melvin Adrien =

Footballer (born 1993)

Personal information
- Date of birth: 30 August 1993 (age 33)
- Place of birth: Le Port, Réunion, France
- Height: 1.83 m (6 ft 0 in)
- Position: Goalkeeper

Team information
- Current team: Thonon Evian
- Number: 30

Senior career*
| Years | Team | Apps | (Gls) |
| 2011–2013 | Créteil B | 3 | (0) |
| 2013–2015 | Mouscron-Péruwelz B | 6 | (0) |
| 2015–2016 | Mulhouse | 0 | (0) |
| 2016–2018 | AC Amiens | 56 | (0) |
| 2018–2021 | Martigues | 44 | (0) |
| 2021–2022 | Louhans-Cuiseaux | 19 | (0) |
| 2022– | Thonon Evian | 37 | (1) |

International career^{‡}
| 2017– | Madagascar | 26 | (0) |
- * Club domestic league appearances and goals as of 21:10, 21 September 2025 (UTC) ‡ National team caps and goals as of 21 March 2024 (UTC)

Melvin Adrien (born 30 August 1993) is a professional footballer who plays as a goalkeeper for Championnat National 3 club Thonon Evian. Born in Réunion, he plays for the Madagascar national team.

== Club career ==
Born in Le Port, Réunion, Adrien has played club football for Créteil B, Mouscron-Péruwelz B, Mulhouse, AC Amiens, Martigues, and Louhans-Cuiseaux.

On 15 June 2022, Adrien joined newly promoted Championnat National 2 side Thonon Evian.

== International career ==
Adrien made his international debut for Madagascar in 2017.

== Career statistics ==
=== International ===
As of matches played on 21 March 2024

Madagascar national team
| Year | Apps | Goals |
| 2017 | 1 | 0 |
| 2018 | 1 | 0 |
| 2019 | 9 | 0 |
| 2020 | 3 | 0 |
| 2021 | 7 | 0 |
| 2023 | 5 | 0 |
| Total | 26 | 0 |
