= Frédéric Nsabiyumva =

Burundian footballer

Personal information
- Date of birth: 26 April 1995 (age 31)
- Place of birth: Bujumbura, Burundi
- Height: 1.90 m (6 ft 3 in)
- Position: Centre-back

Team information
- Current team: Västerås
- Number: 18

Senior career*
Years	Team	Apps	(Gls)
2012–2013	Atlético Olympic Bujumbura		
2014–2018	Jomo Cosmos	101	(7)
2018–2022	Chippa United	60	(1)
2022	Jomo Cosmos	6	(1)
2022–	Västerås	98	(6)

International career^{‡}
2013–	Burundi	50	(1)
- * Club domestic league appearances and goals as of 8 July 2026 ‡ National team caps and goals as of 16:38, 5 May 2025 (UTC)

Frédéric Nsabiyumva (born 26 April 1995) is a Burundian footballer who plays as a centre-back for Västerås in Sweden and for the Burundi national football team.

In October 2026 he played briefly as a goalkeeper following a red card. Being tasked with stopping a penalty kick, Nsabiyumva kept a clean sheet as the shooter put the penalty over the bar.

== International career ==
He was invited by Lofty Naseem, the national team coach, to represent Burundi in the 2014 African Nations Championship held in South Africa.

== Career statistics ==
As of match played 3 March 2016

Appearances and goals by club, season and competition
Club	Season	League			National Cup		League Cup		Continental		Other		Total	
Club	Season	Division	Apps	Goals	Apps	Goals	Apps	Goals	Apps	Goals	Apps	Goals	Apps	Goals
Jomo Cosmos	2013–14	Premier Soccer League	4	1	0	0	0	0	-		-		4	1
Jomo Cosmos	2014–15	Premier Soccer League	28	2	1	0	0	0	-		4	0	33	2
Jomo Cosmos	2015–16	Premier Soccer League	21	0	2	0	1	0	-		-		24	0
Jomo Cosmos	Total		53	3	3	0	1	0	-	-	4	0	61	3
Career total			53	3	3	0	1	0	-	-	4	0	61	3

=== International ===
Burundi national team
Year	Apps	Goals
2013	4	0
2014	5	0
2015	6	0
2016	3	0
2017	1	0
2018	5	0
2019	8	0
2020	2	0
2021	2	0
2022	3	0
2023	4	1
Total	43	1

Statistics accurate as of 19 November 2023
