= Gaël Duhayindavyi =

Burundian footballer

Personal information
- Date of birth: 3 October 1990 (age 36)
- Place of birth: Bujumbura, Burundi
- Height: 1.83 m (6 ft 0 in)
- Position: Midfielder

Team information
- Current team: Mukura Victory Sports

Senior career*
Years	Team	Apps	(Gls)
–2013	Atlético Olympic		
2013–2015	LLB Académic		
2015–2017	Vital'O		
2017–	Mukura Victory Sports		

International career^{‡}
2011–	Burundi	48	(2)
- * Club domestic league appearances and goals ‡ National team caps and goals as of 10 May 2021

Gaël Duhayindavyi (born 3 October 1990) is a Burundian professional footballer who plays as a midfielder for Rwandan side Mukura Victory Sports and the Burundi national team.

== International career ==
He was called up by national team coach Lofty Naseem to represent Burundi in the 2014 African Nations Championship held in South Africa.

=== International goals ===
Scores and results list Burundi's goal tally first.

No	Date	Venue	Opponent	Score	Result	Competition
1.	11 March 2017	Prince Louis Rwagasore Stadium, Bujumbura, Burundi	Djibouti	5–0	7–0	Friendly
2.	10 June 2017	Prince Louis Rwagasore Stadium, Bujumbura, Burundi	South Sudan	2–0	3–0	2019 Africa Cup of Nations qualification
