= Karim Nizigiyimana =

Burundian footballer (born 1989)

Personal information
- Full name: Abdul Karim Nizigiyimana Makenzi
- Date of birth: 21 June 1989 (age 37)
- Place of birth: Bujumbura, Burundi
- Height: 1.72 m (5 ft 8 in)
- Position: Defender

Team information
- Current team: Wazito

Youth career
- 2002–2006: Prince Louis FC

Senior career*
Years	Team	Apps	(Gls)
2006	Vital'O	20	(0)
2008–2009	A.P.R.	11	(0)
2009–2010	Kiyovu Sports	9	(0)
2010	Vita Club	0	(0)
2010–2011	Vital'O		
2011–2015	Rayon Sports		
2015–2018	Gor Mahia		
2019	Vipers		
2019–	Wazito		

International career^{‡}
2004–	Burundi	67	(1)
Medal record
Men's football
Representing Burundi
CECAFA Cup
Runner-up	2004 Ethiopia
- * Club domestic league appearances and goals as of 20 January 2015 ‡ National team caps and goals as of 27 March 2026

Abdul Karim Nizigiyimana Makenzi (born 21 June 1989 in Bujumbura), known as Karim Nizigiyimana, is a Burundian professional footballer who plays as a defender for Kenyan Premier League club Wazito FC and the Burundi national team. He played for Gor Mahia between 2015 and 2018.

== Honours ==
Burundi

- CECAFA Cup: Runner-up, 2004
