= Lalaïna Nomenjanahary =

Malagasy footballer (born 1986)

Lalaina Nomenjanahary
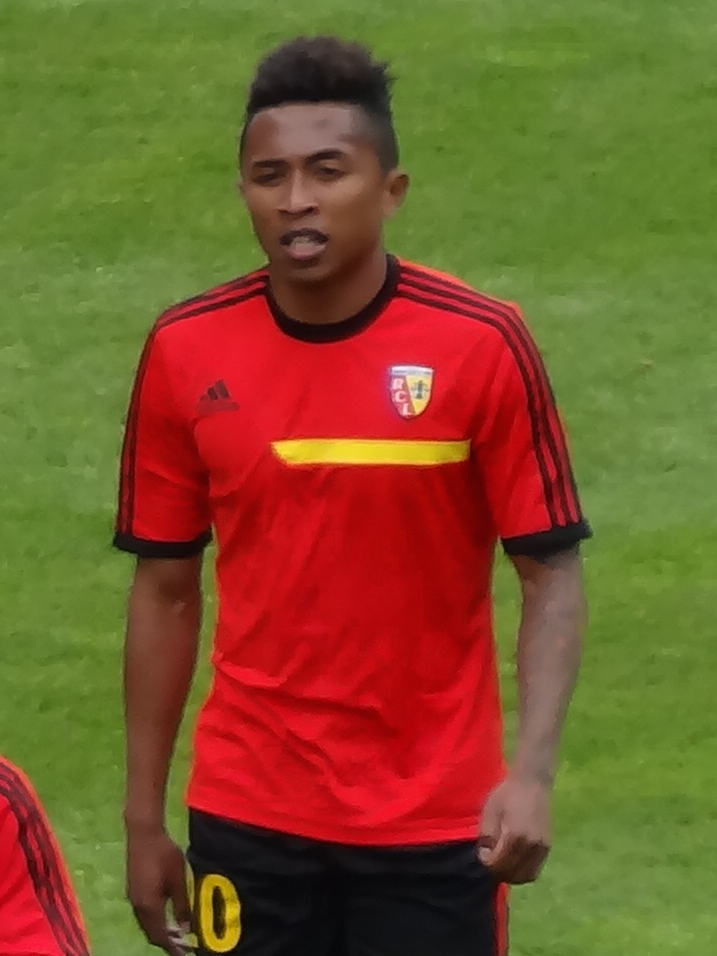
- Nomenjanahary with Lens in 2014

Personal information
- Full name: Lalaïna Henintsoa Nomenjanahary
- Date of birth: 16 January 1986 (age 40)
- Place of birth: Antananarivo, Madagascar
- Height: 1.77 m (5 ft 10 in)
- Position: Midfielder

Senior career*
Years	Team	Apps	(Gls)
2006–2009	Ajesaia		
2009–2010	SS Capricorne		
2010–2011	CS Avion	9	(0)
2011–2012	Lens B	15	(1)
2011–2016	Lens	121	(8)
2016–2021	Paris FC	133	(7)
2021–2022	Paris 13 Atletico	15	(7)

International career
2006–2021	Madagascar	44	(5)
- * Club domestic league appearances and goals as of 18:18, 5 July 2022 (UTC)

Lalaïna Henintsoa Nomenjanahary (born 16 January 1986) is a former Malagasy professional footballer who played as a midfielder.

== Early and personal life ==
Nomenjanahary grew up in a poor family in Antananarivo. During his youth, he made toys from recycled tin cans to sell them. He is married to Julia and since arriving in France, most of his and his wife's family live there as well.

Known for his speed, Nomenjanahary is sometimes referred to by his childhood nickname Bolida. He is good friends with fellow Malagasy footballer Faneva Imà Andriatsima and he looks up to Hervé Arsène as a mentor.

== Club career ==
Early on, Nomenjanahary gained attention as a wing-back. His first club was Ajesaia before moving to play on the island of Réunion.

On the advice of fellow Malagasy player Hervé Arsène, Nomenjanahary decided to sign for Arsène's former club RC Lens in 2012. After two seasons, Nomenjanahary's impressive performances earned him a new three-year contract, keeping him at the club until 2016. When Lens made their return to the Ligue 1 in the 2014–15 season, Nomenjanahary played 26 of the team's 38 matches, and in the third game of the season he scored the only goal in a shock 1–0 win over Olympique Lyonnais. Despite this, Lens ended the season in the bottom of the table and were relegated. On 11 May 2016, after four years with Lens, Nomenjanahary's contract expired.

On 9 September 2016, Nomenjanahary joined fellow Ligue 2 team Paris FC on a one-year contract. On 10 October 2016, Nomenjanahary scored his first goals for Paris as he netted a brace in a 7–0 victory over Val d'Europe in the fifth round of the Coupe de France.

In 2021, after his contract with Paris FC expired, he joined 4th-tier side Paris 13 Atletico.

== International career ==
From 2006 to 2021, Nomenjanahary made 44 appearances and scored 5 goals for the Madagascar national team, including one at the 2019 Africa Cup of Nations in Egypt in a surprise victory over Nigeria. He has said that it is his dream for Madagascar to qualify for the 2018 FIFA World Cup.

== Career statistics ==
=== Club ===
As of 14 March 2020

Appearances and goals by club, season and competition
Club	Season	League			Coupe de France		Coupe de la Ligue		Total		Ref.
Club	Season	Division	Apps	Goals	Apps	Goals	Apps	Goals	Apps	Goals	Ref.
CS Avion	2010–11	National 2	9	0	0	0	0	0	9	0	
Lens B	2011–12	National 2	14	1	–		–		14	1	
Lens B	2012–13	National 2	1	0	–		–		1	0	
Lens B	2015–16	National 2	1	0	–		–		1	0	
Lens B	Total		16	1	0	0	0	0	16	1	–
Lens	2011–12	Ligue 2	2	0	0	0	0	0	2	0	
Lens	2012–13	Ligue 2	34	2	4	0	1	0	39	2	
Lens	2013–14	Ligue 2	34	4	5	0	1	0	40	4	
Lens	2014–15	Ligue 1	27	1	0	0	1	0	28	1	
Lens	2015–16	Ligue 2	28	1	0	0	1	0	28	1	
Lens	Total		125	8	9	0	4	0	138	8	–
Paris FC B	2016–17	National 3	3	0	–		–		3	0	
Paris FC	2016–17	National	23	3	0	0	0	0	23	3	
Paris FC	2017–18	Ligue 2	36	2	1	1	2	0	39	3	
Paris FC	2018–19	Ligue 2	32	2	0	0	1	0	33	2	
Paris FC	2019–20	Ligue 2	23	0	1	0	2	0	26	0	
Paris FC	Total		117	7	2	1	5	0	124	8	–
Career total			267	16	11	1	9	0	287	17	–

=== International ===
As of matches played on 12 July 2019

Appearances and goals by national team and year
National team	Year	Apps	Goals
Madagascar	2006	2	0
Madagascar	2007	9	2
Madagascar	2008	5	0
Madagascar	2009	1	0
Madagascar	2010	2	0
Madagascar	2011	3	0
Madagascar	2012	0	0
Madagascar	2013	0	0
Madagascar	2014	0	0
Madagascar	2015	0	0
Madagascar	2016	0	0
Madagascar	2017	1	0
Madagascar	2018	6	0
Madagascar	2019	6	1
Total		35	3

As of 12 July 2019

Scores and results list Madagascar's goal tally first, score column indicates score after each Nomenjanahary goal.

List of international goals scored by Lalaïna Nomenjanahary
No.	Date	Venue	Opponent	Score	Result	Competition
1	17 November 2007	Stade Said Mohamed Cheikh, Mitsamiouli, Comoros	Comoros	1–1	2–2	2010 FIFA World Cup qualification
2	17 November 2007	Stade Said Mohamed Cheikh, Mitsamiouli, Comoros	Comoros	2–1	2–2	2010 FIFA World Cup qualification
3	22 June 2019	Alexandria Stadium, Alexandria, Egypt	Nigeria	1–0	2–0	2019 Africa Cup of Nations
4	19 November 2019	Stade Général Seyni Kountché, Niger	Niger	1–1	6–2	2021 Africa Cup of Nations qualification
5	19 November 2019	Stade Général Seyni Kountché, Niger	Niger	2–1	6–2	2021 Africa Cup of Nations qualification

== Honours ==
Ajesaia

- THB Champions League: 2007, 2009
- Super Coupe de Madagascar: 2007; 2009
- Coupe de Madagascar: 2006

Madagascar

- Football at the Indian Ocean Island Games silver medal: 2007

Madagascar U20

- COSAFA CUP U20: COSAFA U-20 Challenge Cup 2005

Individual

- Best Player of the THB Champions League: 2007
- Lens Player of the year: 2012
- Ligue 2 Player of the Month: September 2018
- Trophy OFC: Finalist for African Player revelation of the year: 2019

Orders

- Knight Order of Madagascar: 2019
