= Burundi national football team =

Men's association football team

Burundi
- Nickname(s): Intamba; Les Hirondelles; The Chayfs (The Swallows)
- Association: Fédération de Football du Burundi (FBF) (Ishirahamwe ry'umupira w'amaguru ry'Uburundi)
- Confederation: CAF (Africa)
- Sub-confederation: CECAFA (East & Central Africa)
- Head coach: Patrick Sangwa
- Captain: Frédéric Nsabiyumva
- Most caps: Karim Nizigiyimana (66)
- Top scorer: Fiston Abdul Razak (19)
- Home stadium: Intwari Stadium
- FIFA code: BDI
First colours	Second colours	Third colours

FIFA ranking
- Current: 140 ▲2 (7 October 2026)
- Highest: 96 (August 1993)
- Lowest: 160 (July 1998)

First international
- Uganda 7–0 Burundi (Kampala, Uganda; 9 October 1964)

Biggest win
- Burundi 7–0 Djibouti (Bujumbura, Burundi; 11 March 2017); Burundi 8–1 Seychelles (Moroni, Comoros; 4 September 2021)

Biggest defeat
- Congo 8–0 Burundi (Cameroon; 24 December 1977)

Africa Cup of Nations
- Appearances: 1 (first in 2019)
- Best result: Group stage (2019)

African Nations Championship
- Appearances: 1 (first in 2014)
- Best result: Group stage (2014)

CECAFA Cup
- Appearances: 14 (first in 1999)
- Best result: Runners-up (2004)

The Burundi national football team (Kirundi: Umurwi nserukira gihugu w'umupira w'amaguru w'u Burundi), nicknamed The Fighting Swallows (French: Les Hirondelles en Guerre; Kirundi: Intamba m'Urugamba), represents Burundi in international football and is controlled by the Football Federation of Burundi. The team has never qualified for the FIFA World Cup. Burundi previously did come very close to qualifying for the 1994 Africa Cup of Nations, losing only on penalties to Guinea in a playoff. However, in 2019, it qualified for the first time in a major tournament, and took part in the Africa Cup of Nations finals in Group B, but lost all its matches and left from the group stage without scoring a single goal.

== History ==
=== Difficult beginnings (1974–1992) ===
The Burundi football team was created in 1971 by the Football Federation of Burundi. The Swallows' first match was in a 1976 African Cup of Nations qualification match against Somalia, which ended in a 2–0 victory. Following a 1–0 loss in the second leg, Burundi qualified to meet Egypt in the next round where they lost 5–0 on aggregate and were eliminated. It would be seventeen years before Burundi played another AFCON qualifying match. In their first twenty years, Burundi played in twenty fixtures and managed 6 wins, 2 draws and 12 defeats.

=== Narrowly missing qualification (1992–1998) ===
In 1992, Burundi entered the qualification rounds for the FIFA World Cup for the first time, but were eliminated in the first round following one win (1–0 against Ghana), one draw (0–0 against Algeria) and two losses in the reverse fixtures to finish bottom of the group. Burundi then finished joint top in their 1994 African Cup of Nations qualification group however they lost their play-off match against Guinea on penalties. Due to the Burundian Civil War, Burundi withdrew from the 1996 and 1998 AFCON qualifiers and, despite beating Sierra Leone 2–0 on aggregate and qualifying for the final round of the 1998 FIFA World Cup qualifiers, they withdrew again.

=== African Cup of Nations qualifiers (2000–2015) ===
Following successive withdrawals from the AFCON qualifiers, Burundi returned for the 2000 competition, beating Tanzania in the preliminary rounds before finishing third in their group behind Burkina Faso and Senegal. In the 2002 qualifiers, Burundi again advanced to the group stages of qualification by beating Djibouti (4–1), but finished last in their group with only two points. In 2004, Burundi performed even worse, collecting no points and finishing last behind South Africa and Ivory Coast. In 2008 Burundi finished five points behind leaders Egypt and didn't make it through to the next round. In 2012 Burundi were even further adrift, finishing thirteen points behind group winners Ivory Coast. For the 2013 qualifiers, Burundi failed to advance due to away goals against Zimbabwe (2–2), and in 2015 they lost to Botswana (1–0) .

=== FIFA World Cup qualifiers (2002–2014) ===
Burundi did not participate in the 2002 qualification process but re-entered in 2006, only to get knocked out by Gabon in the first round (4–1). In 2010, Burundi managed two victories, both against Seychelles but failed to go through behind Burkina Faso and Tunisia. The 2006 and 2010 qualifiers doubled as qualification for the FIFA World Cup and Africa Cup of Nations. The following qualification cycle, Burundi were eliminated by Lesotho in the first round (3–2).

=== First CAN qualification (2017–present) ===
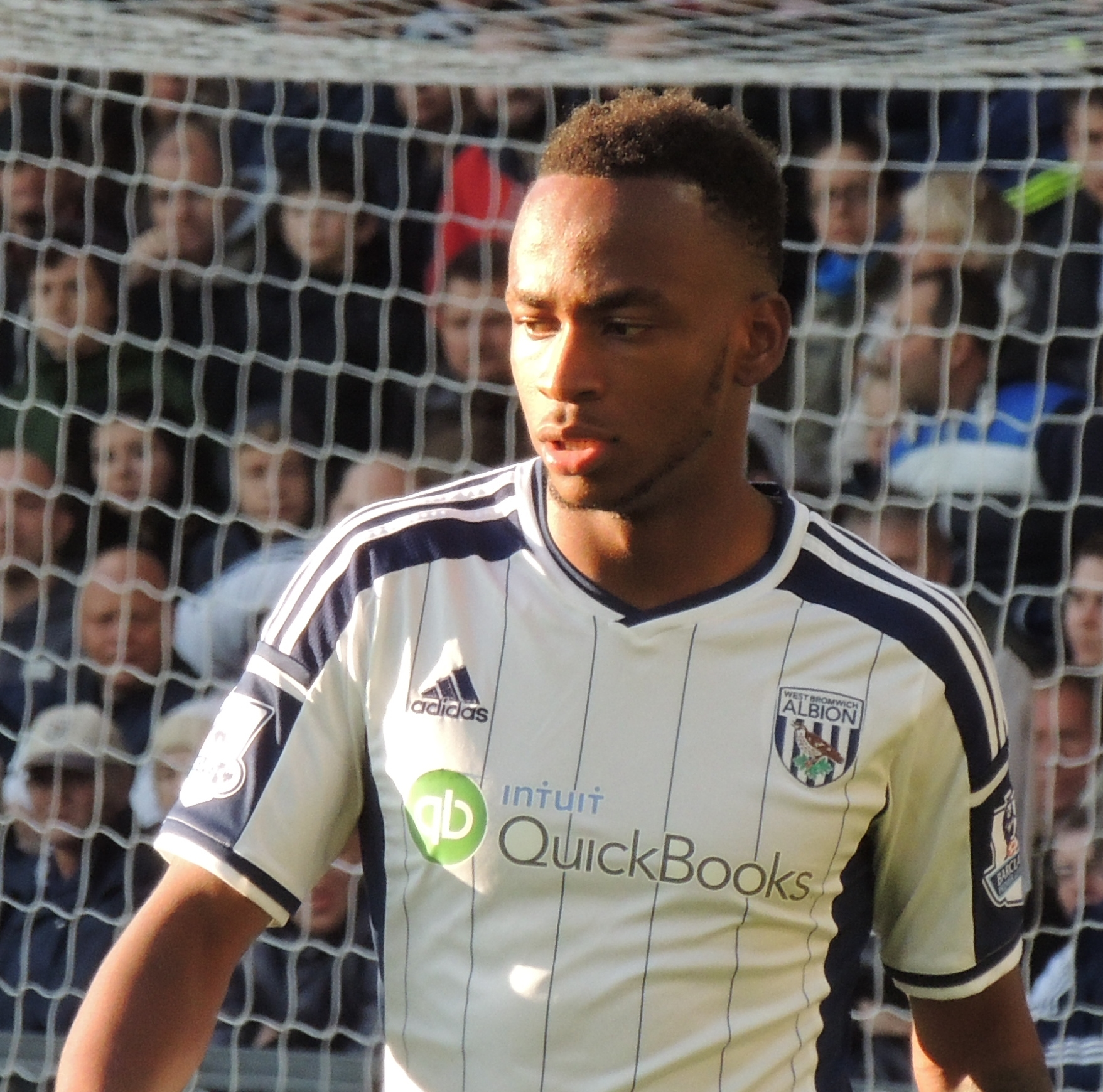
Saido Berahino scored on his international debut for Burundi in September 2018

After falling in the second qualifying round for the 2018 FIFA World Cup against DR Congo, Burundi focused on convincing Gaël Bigirimana and Saido Berahino to come and play for the selection, both playing in Europe (for Hibernian and Stoke City respectively). Both players agreed and Berahino scored on his debut to earn the team a 1–1 draw against Gabon. In March 2019, in the final group game, Burundi played a decisive match against Gabon needing only one point to qualify. The match ended in a draw (1–1), with a goal from Cédric Amissi earning Burundi their first opportunity to play in the Africa Cup of Nations. Burundi lost all three of their matches at the 2019 Africa Cup of Nations, failing to register a single goal.

== Team image ==
=== Colours ===
Traditionally, the Burundi team wears the three colours of its flag: red, green and white.

=== Sponsors ===
Kit provider	Period
(Germany) Adidas	1995–1998
(Italy) Lotto	1998–1999
(Germany) Adidas	2000–2006
(Germany) Puma	2006–2008
(Germany) Adidas	2008–2011
(Italy) Erreà	2011-2014
(Germany) Adidas	2014–2018
(Italy) Garman	2019–2020
(Italy) Macron	2021-2022
(Italy) Erreà	2022-23
(Netherlands) Mastia	2023
(Italy) Erreà	2024
(Ethiopia) Wanaw	2025–present

=== Stadium ===
The Burundi team have played most of their matches in Bujumbura at the Intwari Stadium. The second match in its history, Burundi is playing its first home match against Somalia (3–0 victory). The Intwari stadium is home to Vital'O FC and Prince Louis FC, as well as the national team. The stadium has been renovated several times, notably in March 2018, due to a flooded pitch.

=== Supporters ===
During the matches at the Intwari Stadium, the Burundian supporters used to be often outnumbered, in particular because of the rather low capacity of the stadium (10,000 seats) for around 13,000 spectators. Just like the players, the supporters dress in red, green and white and bring the flag of the country. During the match in March 2019 against Gabon, the authorities have made additional seats available because of the lack of space in the stands. In 2022, the stadium underwent renovation project increasing its capacity to 22,000 seats.

== Results and fixtures ==
The following is a list of match results in the last 12 months, as well as any future matches that have been scheduled.

Win Draw Loss Fixture

=== 2026 ===
27 March 2027 AFCON qualification	Chad	0–4	Burundi	N'Djamena, Chad
14:00 UTC+1		Report	Liongola 6'; Kanakimana 32'; Mpawenimana 63'; Girumugisha 74'	Stadium: Stade Olympique Maréchal Idriss Déby Itno; Referee: Ailton Carmelino (Angola)

31 March 2027 AFCON qualification	Burundi	4–0	Chad	Bujumbura, Burundi
15:00 UTC+2	Kanakimana 14', 22'; Girumugisha 71'; Mpawenimana 80'	Report		Stadium: Intwari Stadium; Referee: Jalal Jayed (Morocco)

26 May Friendly	Morocco	5–0	Burundi	Salé, Morocco
18:00 UTC+1	El Kaabi 59', 63'; Bentayeb 71'; Benjdida 80', 90'	Report		Stadium: Mohammed VI Football Complexe; Attendance: 0 (BCD)

25 September 2027 AFCON qualification	Togo	1–0	Burundi	Lomé, Togo
18:00 UTC+0	Karim 19'			Stadium: Kégué Stadium

29 September 2027 AFCON qualification	Burundi	2–2	Algeria	Bujumbura, Burundi
15:00 UTC+0	Chaïbi 5' (o.g.); Girumugisha 12'		Belloumi 30'; Boulbina 63'	Stadium: Intwari Stadium

11 November 2027 AFCON qualification	Zambia	v	Burundi	TBD, Zambia
TBD				Stadium: TBD

15 November 2027 AFCON qualification	Burundi	v	Zambia	TBD, Burundi
TBD				Stadium: TBD

=== 2027 ===
24 March 2027 AFCON qualification	Burundi	v	Togo	TBD, Burundi
TBD				Stadium: TBD

28 March 2027 AFCON qualification	Algeria	v	Burundi	TBD, Algeria
TBD				Stadium: TBD

== Coaching staff ==
Position	Name
Head Coach	(Democratic Republic of the Congo) Patrick Sangwa Mayani
Assistant Coach	(Burundi) Philippe Habimana
Goalkeeping Coach	(Burundi) Abdoul Ndizeye
Match Analyst	(Burundi) Auguste Nduwimana
Fitness Coach	(Burundi) Antoine Nshimiyimana
Doctors	(Burundi) Dr. Gauthier Ndayambaje (Burundi) Dr. Laurent Ngabonziza
Physiotherapists	(Burundi) Baudouin Niyomukiza (Burundi) Gervayi Ngendahayo (Burundi) André Ndayishimiye (Burundi) Flavien Niyigena
Team Coordinator	(Burundi) Selemani Ndikumana
Technical Director	(Burundi) Olivier Niyungeko

=== Coaching history ===
- (Soviet Union) Nikolay Yefimov (Until 1991)
- (Burundi) Baudouin Ribakare (1992)
- (Russia) Aleksandr Rakitsky (1993–1996)
- (Burundi) Baudouin Ribakare (1997–2004)
- (Algeria) Adel Amrouche (2007–2012)
- (Egypt) Lofty Naseem (2012–2014)
- (Germany) Rainer Willfeld (2014–2015)
- (Algeria) Ahcene Aït-Abdelmalek (2015–2016)
- (Burundi) Olivier Niyungeko (2016–2019)
- (Burundi) Joslin Bipfubusa (2020)
- (Burundi) Jimmy Ndayizeye (2020–2022)
- (Burundi) Etienne Ndayiragije (2023–2024)
- (Democratic Republic of the Congo) Patrick Sangwa Mayani (2024-present)

== Players ==
=== Current squad ===
The following players were called up to the squad for the 2027 Africa Cup of Nations qualification Group I matches against Zambia on 11 and 15 November 2026.

Caps and goals are correct as of 29 September 2026, after the match against Algeria.

No.	Pos.	Player	Date of birth (age)	Caps	Goals	Club
	GK	Jonathan Nahimana	12 December 1999 (age 26)	41	0	(Rwanda Football Federation) Gicumbi
	GK	Onésime Rukundo	9 April 1999 (age 27)	14	0	(Rwanda Football Federation) Police
	GK	Daniel Hakizimana	25 April 2001 (age 25)	0	0	(Football Federation of Burundi) Musongati
	DF	Christophe Nduwarugira	22 June 1994 (age 32)	48	6	(Football Association of Indonesia) PSS Sleman
	DF	Frédéric Nsabiyumva	26 April 1995 (age 31)	48	1	(Swedish Football Association) Västerås
	DF	Youssouf Ndayishimiye	27 October 1998 (age 28)	25	1	(French Football Federation) Nice
	DF	Omar Moussa	30 August 1997 (age 29)	24	0	(Rwanda Football Federation) Gorilla
	DF	Derrick Mukombozi	26 April 1999 (age 27)	9	0	(Tanzania Football Federation) Fountain Gate
	DF	Claus Niyukuri	13 February 2000 (age 26)	8	0	(Norwegian Football Federation) Sarpsborg 08
	DF	Kevin Icoyitungiye	21 November 2004 (age 21)	2	0	(Football Federation of Burundi) Aigle Noir
	DF	Emanuel Swedi	16 December 2003 (age 22)	1	0	(Swedish Football Association) Nordic United
	MF	Gaël Bigirimana	22 October 1993 (age 33)	22	0	(Irish Football Association) Dungannon Swifts
	MF	Elie Mokono	23 February 1994 (age 32)	20	1	(Rwanda Football Federation) Rayon Sports
	MF	Henry Msanga	22 August 1999 (age 27)	19	0	(Libyan Football Federation) Al Ta'awon
	MF	Akbar Muderi	28 April 2003 (age 23)	11	1	(Rwanda Football Federation) Rayon Sports
	FW	Bienvenue Kanakimana	28 December 1999 (age 26)	31	8	(Football Association of the Czech Republic) Zbrojovka Brno
	FW	Mohamed Amissi	3 August 2000 (age 26)	27	0	(Canadian Soccer Association) Vancouver
	FW	Bonfils-Caleb Bimenyimana	21 November 1997 (age 28)	26	7	(Syrian Football Association) Al-Karamah
	FW	Jean-Claude Girumugisha	18 September 2004 (age 22)	21	5	(Libyan Football Federation) Al-Ahli
	FW	Jordi Liongola	17 May 2000 (age 26)	17	1	(The Football Association) Sheffield Wednesday
	FW	Asman Ndikumana	10 June 1999 (age 27)	9	2	(Rwanda Football Federation) Police
	FW	Abdoul Karim Mpawenimana	22 October 2002 (age 24)	5	2	(Mozambican Football Federation) Costa do Sol
	FW	Mossi Nduwumwe	29 November 2003 (age 22)	2	0	(Algerian Football Federation) MC Alger
	FW	Franck Nduwimana	26 April 2002 (age 24)	1	0	(Football Kenya Federation) Kenya Commercial Bank
	FW	Karim Mperanyi	2 September 2006 (age 20)	0	0	(Royal Dutch Football Association) NAC Breda

=== Recent call-ups ===
The following players have been called up for Burundi in the last 12 months.

Pos.	Player	Date of birth (age)	Caps	Goals	Club	Latest call-up
DF	Djuma Nzeyimana	1 January 2000 (age 26)	0	0	(Burundi) Aigle Noir	v. Equatorial Guinea, 4 June 2026
MF	Saidi Ntibazonkiza	1 May 1987 (age 39)	31	13	(Burundi) Vital'O	v. Equatorial Guinea, 4 June 2026
MF	Aaron Musore	28 December 1999 (age 26)	5	0	(Zambia) Green Eagles	v. Equatorial Guinea, 4 June 2026
MF	Leonard Gakwaya	1 June 2002 (age 24)	1	0	(Rwanda) Police	v. Equatorial Guinea, 4 June 2026
MF	Abedi Bigirimana	1 January 2002 (age 24)	19	4	(Rwanda) Rayon Sports	v. Chad; 31 March 2026
MF	Parfait Bizoza	3 March 1999 (age 27)	0	0	(Norway) Haugesund	v. Chad; 31 March 2026
FW	Cédric Amissi	20 March 1990 (age 36)	55	10	(Burundi) Inter Star	v. Equatorial Guinea, 4 June 2026
FW	Vancy Mabanza	27 November 2000 (age 25)	0	0	(Belgium) Lokeren	v. Equatorial Guinea, 4 June 2026
FW	Abdi Ineza	12 December 2004 (age 21)	1	0	(Egypt) Ghazl El Mahalla	v. Chad; 31 March 2026

== Player records ==
As of 14 October 2025
Players in bold are still active with Burundi.

Most appearances
Rank	Player	Caps	Goals	Career
1	Karim Nizigiyimana	66	0	2004–2023
2	Cédric Amissi	56	10	2009–2023
3	**Christophe Nduwarugira**	54	7	2012–present
4	**Fiston Abdul Razak**	53	19	2009–present
5	**Frédéric Nsabiyumva**	52	1	2013–present
6	**Shassiri Nahimana**	51	2	2013–present
7	Gaël Duhayindavyi	50	2	2011–2019
8	Hassan Hakizimana	46	1	2007–2014
8	Pierre Kwizera	46	3	2009–2019
8	**Jonathan Nahimana**	46	0	2017–present

Top goalscorers
Rank	Player	Goals	Caps	Ratio	Career
1	**Fiston Abdul Razak**	19	53	0.36	2009–present
2	**Saidi Ntibazonkiza**	13	36	0.36	2004–present
3	Selemani Ndikumana	12	33	0.36	2003–2019
4	Banga Lewis Kubi	11	16	0.69	1998–2004
5	Cédric Amissi	10	56	0.18	2009–2023
6	**Jospin Nshimirimana**	8	15	0.53	2020–present
6	Papa Claude Nahimana	8	29	0.28	2007–2013
8	**Bonfils-Caleb Bimenyimana**	7	27	0.26	2017–present
8	**Christophe Nduwarugira**	7	54	0.13	2012–present
10	Amissi Tambwe	6	25	0.24	2011–2020

== Competitive record ==
=== FIFA World Cup ===
FIFA World Cup record									Qualification record					
Year	Round	Position	Pld	W	D*	L	GF	GA	Pld	W	D*	L	GF	GA
1930 to 1962	Part of Belgium								Part of Belgium					
1966 and 1970	Not a FIFA member								Not a FIFA member					
1974 to 1990	Did not enter								Declined participation					
(United States) 1994	Did not qualify								4	1	1	2	2	4
(France) 1998	Withdrew during qualifying								2	2	0	0	2	0
(South Korea) (Japan) 2002	Withdrew								Withdrew					
(Germany) 2006	Did not qualify								2	0	1	1	1	4
(South Africa) 2010	Did not qualify								6	2	0	4	5	9
(Brazil) 2014	Did not qualify								2	0	1	1	2	3
(Russia) 2018	Did not qualify								4	2	0	2	5	6
(Qatar) 2022	Did not qualify								2	0	2	0	2	2
(Canada) (Mexico) (United States) 2026	Did not qualify								10	3	1	6	13	13
(Morocco) (Portugal) (Spain) 2030	To be determined								To be determined					
(Saudi Arabia) 2034	To be determined								To be determined					
Total		0/13							32	10	6	16	32	41

=== Africa Cup of Nations ===
Africa Cup of Nations record
Year	Round	Position	Pld	W	D*	L	GF	GA
(Sudan) 1957 to (Ethiopia) 1962	Part of Belgium							
(Ghana) 1963 to (Cameroon) 1972	Not affiliated to CAF							
(Egypt) 1974	Did not enter							
(Ethiopia) 1976	Did not qualify							
(Ghana) 1978	Did not enter							
(Nigeria) 1980	Withdrew							
(Libya) 1982 to (Senegal) 1992	Did not enter							
(Tunisia) 1994	Did not qualify							
(South Africa) 1996	Did not enter							
(Burkina Faso) 1998	Withdrew							
(Ghana) (Nigeria) 2000 to (Gabon) 2017	Did not qualify							
(Egypt) 2019	Group stage	22nd	3	0	0	3	0	4
(Cameroon) 2021	Did not qualify							
(Ivory Coast) 2023	Did not qualify							
(Morocco) 2025	Did not qualify							
(Kenya) (Tanzania) (Uganda) 2027	To be determined							
2029	To be determined							
Total	Group stage	1/35	3	0	0	3	0	4

=== African Nations Championship ===
African Nations Championship record
Appearances: 1
Year	Round	Position	Pld	W	D*	L	GF	GA
(Ivory Coast) 2009	Did not qualify							
(Sudan) 2011	Did not qualify							
(South Africa) 2014	Group stage	10th	3	1	1	1	4	4
(Rwanda) 2016	Did not qualify							
(Morocco) 2018	Did not qualify							
(Cameroon) 2020	Did not qualify							
(Algeria) 2022	Did not qualify							
(Kenya) (Tanzania) (Uganda) 2024	Did not qualify							
Total	Group stage	1/8	3	1	1	1	4	4

== Honours ==
=== Regional ===
- CECAFA Cup
  - (silver) Runners-up (1): 2004
